= Economy of Serbia =

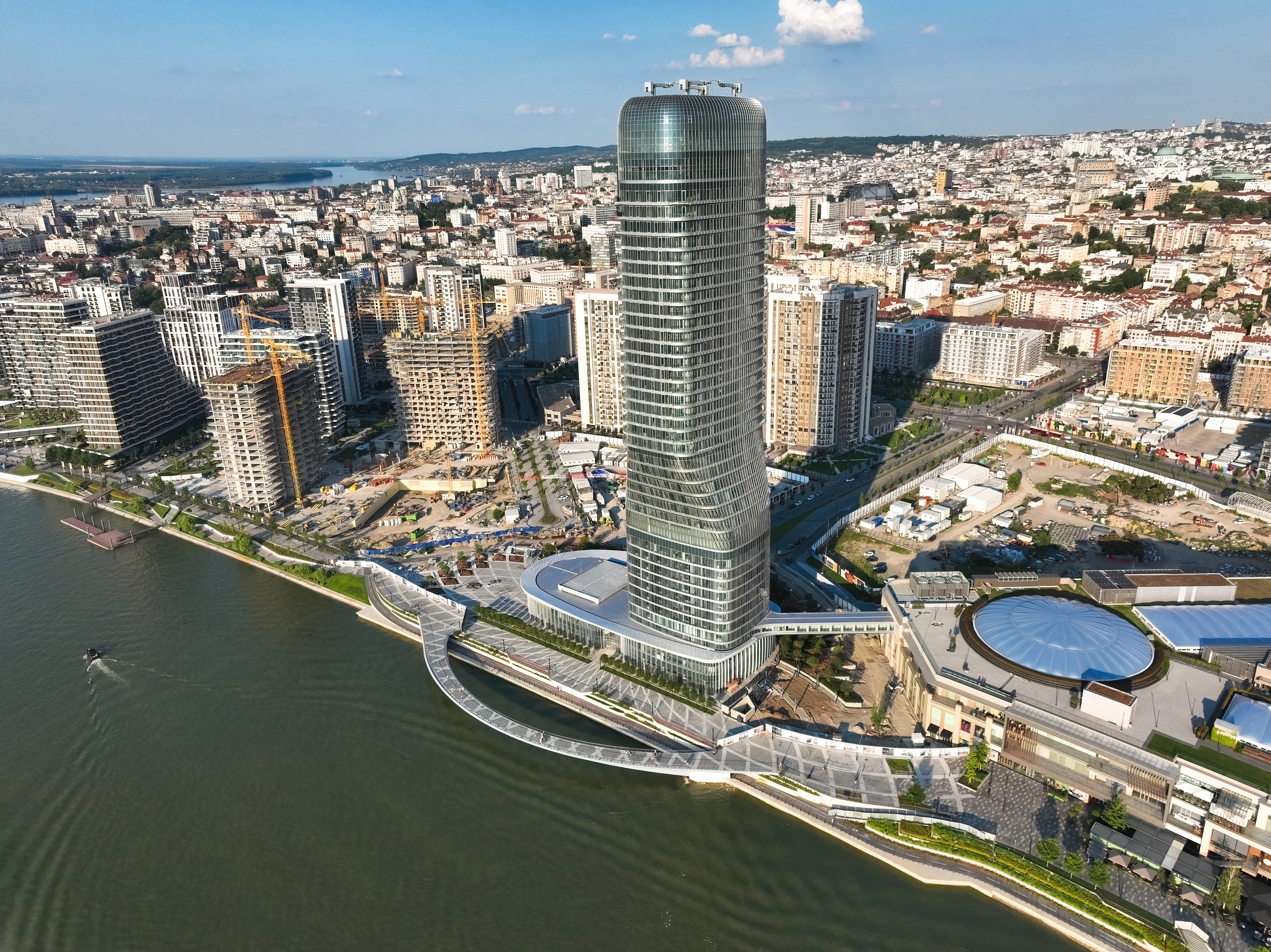
- Belgrade, the financial centre of Serbia
- Currency: Serbian dinar (RSD, дин)
- Fiscal year: Calendar year
- Trade organisations: CEFTA
- Country group: Developing/Emerging; Upper-middle-income economy

Statistics
- Population: ▼6,532,019 (2026)
- GDP: ▲$112.03 billion (nominal; 2026); ▲$226.38 billion (PPP; 2026)
- GDP rank: 73rd (nominal; 2026); 79th (PPP; 2026)
- GDP growth: ▼2.5% (2025); ▲3.3% (2026f)
- GDP per capita: ▲$17,250 (nominal; 2026); ▲$34,860 (PPP; 2026)
- GDP per capita rank: 67th (nominal; 2026); 66th (PPP; 2026)
- GDP per capita growth: ▼2.6% (2025)
- GDP by sector: services: 58.8%; industry: 23.1%; agriculture: 3.2% (2024)
- GDP by component: Private consumption: 61.1%; Public consumption: 9.5%; Investments: 23.8% (2024)
- Inflation (CPI): ▼1.9% (July 2026)
- Population below national poverty line: ▼19.6% (2025); ▼23.2% at risk (2025)
- Gini coefficient: ▲32.0 medium (2025)
- Human Development Index: ▲0.833 very high (2023, 62nd); ▲0.772 high (2023, IHDI 45th)
- Corruption Perceptions Index: ▼33 out of 100 points (2025, 116th)
- Labour force: ▼3,060,300 (2026); ▲50.9% employment rate (2026)
- Labour force by occupation: services: 60.1%; industry: 28.6%; agriculture: 11.3% (2025)
- Unemployment: ▼7.2% (Q2 2026); ▼22.0% youth (Q2 2026)
- Average gross salary: RSD 168,008 / €1,431 / $1,635 monthly (April 2026)
- Average net salary: RSD 121,805 / €1,038 / $1,185 monthly (April 2026)
- Main industries: motor vehicle, base metals, food processing, machinery, chemicals, tires, pharmaceuticals

External
- Exports: ▲$37.314 billion (2025)
- Export goods: motor vehicles ($2.42bn), electrical machines ($2.033bn), non-ferrous metals ($2.005bn), rubber and plastics products ($1.670bn), chemicals and chemical products ($1.193bn)
- Main export partners: EU 62.4%; Germany 15.4%; Italy 6.8%; Hungary 4.6%; Romania 4.2%; Czechia 4.1%; Bulgaria 3.4%; Croatia 3.1%; Poland 2.8%; Bosnia and Herzegovina 6.2%; China 5.6%; Montenegro 4.4%; Turkey 3.7%; North Macedonia 3.2%; (2025)
- Imports: ▲$47.227 billion (2025)
- Import goods: chemicals and chemical products ($2.408bn), general purpose machinery ($2.100bn), petroleum and natural gas ($1.977bn), motor vehicles ($1.818bn), basic metals ($1.740bn),
- Main import partners: EU 55%; Germany 11.7%; Italy 6.6%; Hungary 4.5%; Poland 3.6%; China 15.4%; Turkey 5.2%; Russia 3%; (2025)
- FDI stock: ▲$52.554 billion (2021 est.); Abroad: NA
- Current account: ▼ -$6.379 billion (2026)
- Gross external debt: ▲€39.4 billion (2026)

Public finance
- Government debt: ▼41.7% of GDP (2026)
- Foreign reserves: ▲$35.2 billion (2026)
- Budget balance: -$2.554 billion (2026) -2.28% of GDP (2026)
- Revenue: ▲$46.639 billion (2026); 41.38% of GDP (2026)
- Spending: ▲$48.923 billion (2026); 43.67% of GDP (2026)
- Economic aid: €14.162 billion of EU IPA (2021–27)
- Credit rating: S&P; BBB-; Outlook: Positive (2025); Moody's: Ba2; Outlook: Positive (2025); Fitch: BB+; Outlook: Positive (2025); Scope: BB+; Outlook: Stable (2025)
- All values, unless otherwise stated, are in US dollars.

The economy of Serbia is a developing market economy. Serbia has a significant manufacturing base, focused mainly on electrical machinery, automobiles, base metals, and rubber products. The Serbian economy's core exports include electrical equipment, motor vehicles, copper and base metals, tires, and pharmaceuticals. Highly dependent on international trade in Europe, key trading partners include the EU, its neighbors, as well as China and Turkey. The capital city and financial centre is Belgrade, with Novi Sad and Bor being important economic hubs.

== Historical preview ==
In the decades leading up to World War I, GDP growth in Serbia grew by 0.28% per annum. This was a slower growth rate than Northwestern Europe, leading to a widening economic divergence between Serbia and Western Europe. Prior to WWI, there was extensive growth in Serbia's dominant agricultural sector. Industrial and service sectors remained small.

In the late 1980s, at the beginning of the process of economic transition from a planned economy to a market economy, Serbia's economy had a favorable position in comparison to most of the Eastern Bloc countries, but it was gravely impacted by poor economic decision-making in the 1990s, the Yugoslav Wars, and UN sanctions and trade embargo during the 1990s. The country experienced one of the most extreme hyperinflation episodes in modern history, peaking at a monthly rate of around 313 million percent in January 1994. At the same time, the country experienced a serious "brain drain". There was a severe recession which continued until 1999.

After the overthrow of Slobodan Milošević in 2000, Serbia went through a process of transition to a market-based economy and experienced sustained economic growth. During that period, the Serbian economy grew 4–5% annually, average wages quadrupled, and economic and social opportunities dramatically improved. During the Great Recession, Serbia marked a decline in its economy of 3.1% in 2009, and following years of economic stagnation pre-crisis level of GDP was reached only in 2016.

Since 2014, the country has been in the process of accession negotiations to join the European Union. An IMF Stand-By Arrangement running from 2015 to 2017 supported fiscal consolidation, with general government debt falling from about 70% of GDP in 2015 to approximately 52% by 2019. Real GDP growth averaged 3–4% annually from 2017 to 2019. The COVID-19 recession produced a milder contraction in Serbia than in most European economies, with output declining 0.9% in 2020 and rebounding 7.5% in 2021. The 2021–2023 inflation surge, driven by global energy and food price shocks following the Russian invasion of Ukraine, pushed annual inflation to a peak of around 16% in early 2023, prompting the National Bank of Serbia to tighten monetary policy. Growth recovered to 2.5% in 2023 and an estimated 3.9% in 2024.

Foreign direct investment reached record levels, averaging more than €4 billion per year between 2021 and 2024, with major investments by Stellantis (automotive, Kragujevac), Zijin Mining (copper, Bor) and Linglong (tires, Zrenjanin). In July 2024, a free-trade agreement with China entered into force, making Serbia one of the few European countries with comprehensive free-trade arrangements covering both the EU and China. As of 2024, the World Bank classified Serbia as an upper middle income economy, and the European Commission assessed it as "a functioning market economy".

== Macroeconomic trends ==
=== Economic growth ===
The Serbian economy is expected to grow to $116 billion in 2029, slightly outpacing the rest of the former Yugoslav Republics according to the IMF. Its economy has been the largest former Yugoslav by purchasing power parity (PPP) since 2008 and the second-largest by nominal GDP since 1998. Serbia's debt-to-GDP ratio as of 2025 at 38.1%, which is lower than the 60% level defined by the Maastricht criteria as the upper limit of an acceptable level. Its sovereign debt level is projected to be the second-lowest among the former Yugoslav Republics by 2029, with an expected increase from the current 38.1% to 40.7% of GDP. The average growth of Serbia's GDP from 2020 to 2025 was 4% per year.

The Serbian economy by sector consists of services at 57.58%, industry at 23.97%, and agriculture at 3.79%. Its GDP composition by end-use is composed of the following:

- household consumption: 62.6% (2023 est.)
- government consumption: 17.1% (2023 est.)
- investment in fixed capital: 23.4% (2023 est.)
- investment in inventories: 1.2% (2023 est.)
- exports of goods and services: 55.1% (2023 est.)
- imports of goods and services: -59.4% (2023 est.)

GDP Growth
Year	2000	2001	2002	2003	2004	2005	2006	2007	2008	2009	2010	2011	2012	2013	2014	2015	2016	2017	2018	2019	2020	2021	2022	2023	2024	2025
Rate	6.1%	6.8%	6.5%	4.3%	6.7%	5.9%	3.9%	7.8%	5.2%	-3.1%	1.6%	0.1%	-0.4%	0.5%	-1.8%	1.3%	3%	2.4%	4.6%	4.8%	-1%	7.9%	2.7%	3.7%	3.9%	2%
Source: International Monetary Fund

=== Public finances ===
Serbia's public debt relative to GDP from 2000 to 2008 decreased by 140.1 percentage points, and then started increasing again as the government was fighting effects of worldwide 2008 financial crisis. In 2025, the public debt stood at 44.4% of GDP.

Public debt
Year	2000	2001	2002	2003	2004	2005	2006	2007	2008	2009	2010	2011	2012	2013	2014	2015	2016	2017	2018	2019	2020	2021	2022	2023	2024	2025	2026 (30.06)
Billions EUR	14.17	13.43	11.53	11.02	9.68	10.28	9.35	8.87	8.78	9.85	12.16	14.79	17.18	20.14	22.76	24.82	24.82	23.22	23.01	23.94	26.67	30.13	33.33	36.15	38.87	39.34	41.29
Share of GDP	179.6%	88.1%	61.4%	55.4%	48.7%	46.5%	33.0%	26.8%	25.8%	29.8%	37.9%	41.2%	50.8%	53.7%	63.4%	67.2%	65.2%	55.5%	51.4%	49.7%	54.4%	53.9%	52.4%	48%	46.7%	44.4%	43.8%
Source: Ministry of Finance of Serbia Public debt Administration

Serbian foreign exchange reserves were highly augmented from 2000 to 2009, when they amounted 10.6 billion euros and have stayed at that level ever since.

Foreign exchange reserves
Year	2000	2002	2003	2004	2005	2006	2007	2008	2009	2010	2011	2012	2013	2014	2015	2016	2017	2018	2019	2020	2021	2022	2023	2024	2025
Central bank (bln. EUR)	0.55	2.19	2.83	3.10	4.92	9.02	9.63	8.16	10.60	10.00	12.06	10.91	11.19	9.91	10.38	10.20	9.96	11.26	13.38	13.49	16.46	19.42	24.91	29.29	29.01
Comm. banks (bln. EUR)	0.39	0.68	0.67	0.59	0.55	0.52	1.22	0.92	1.43	1.68	0.81	1.06	0.91	1.73	1.43	1.56	1.11	1.63	1.51	2.06	2.89	2.67	2.95	3.18	2.89
Total (bln. EUR)	0.95	2.86	3.50	3.69	5.47	9.54	10.85	9.08	12.03	11.69	12.87	11.97	12.10	11.64	11.81	11.76	11.07	12.89	14.89	15.55	19.35	22.09	27.86	32.47	31.90
Source: National Bank of Serbia

=== Currency and inflation ===
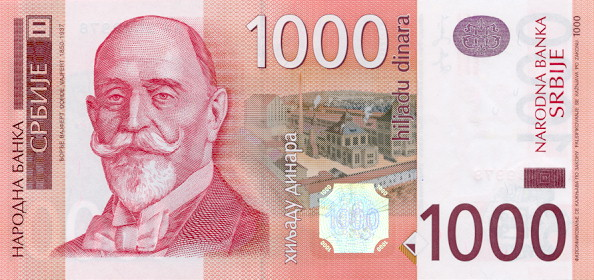
1000 Serbian dinar banknote

The official currency in Serbia is the Serbian dinar and its earliest use dates back to 1214.

Serbia historically has battled high inflation, especially during the 1980s and 1990s. In 1992 and 1993, it experienced a period of hyperinflation which lasted for a total of 25 months. In 1993, the monthly inflation rate stood at a staggering 313 million percent. Since the early 2000s, the inflation rate has stabilized and in the last couple of years a relatively low level of inflation was recorded.

Inflation and Serbian dinar Exchange Rates
Year	2002	2004	2006	2008	2009	2010	2011	2012	2013	2014	2015	2016	2017	2018	2019	2020	2021	2022	2023	2024	2025
Inflation rate	19.5%	11.0%	11.7%	12.4%	8.1%	6.1%	11.1%	7.3%	7.7%	2.1%	1.4%	1.1%	3%	2%	1.9%	1.1%	4.2%	15.0%	7.6%	4.3%	2.7%
USD/RSD	58.98	57.94	59.98	62.90	66.73	79.28	80.87	86.18	83.13	99.46	111.25	117.13	99.11	103.39	104.92	101.92	103.61	110.48	106.18	112.78	100.22
EUR/RSD	61.51	78.89	79.00	88.60	95.89	105.50	104.64	113.72	114.64	120.96	121.63	123.47	118.45	118.19	117.59	117.45	117.22	117.67	117.53	117.37	117.63
Source: World Bank, National Bank of Serbia; Note: All exchange data retrieved each year on December 31

== Economic sectors ==
In 2022, the sector with the highest number of companies registered in Serbia is Services with 125,511 companies followed by Wholesale Trade and Manufacturing with 28,699 and 21,865 companies respectively.

=== Agriculture ===
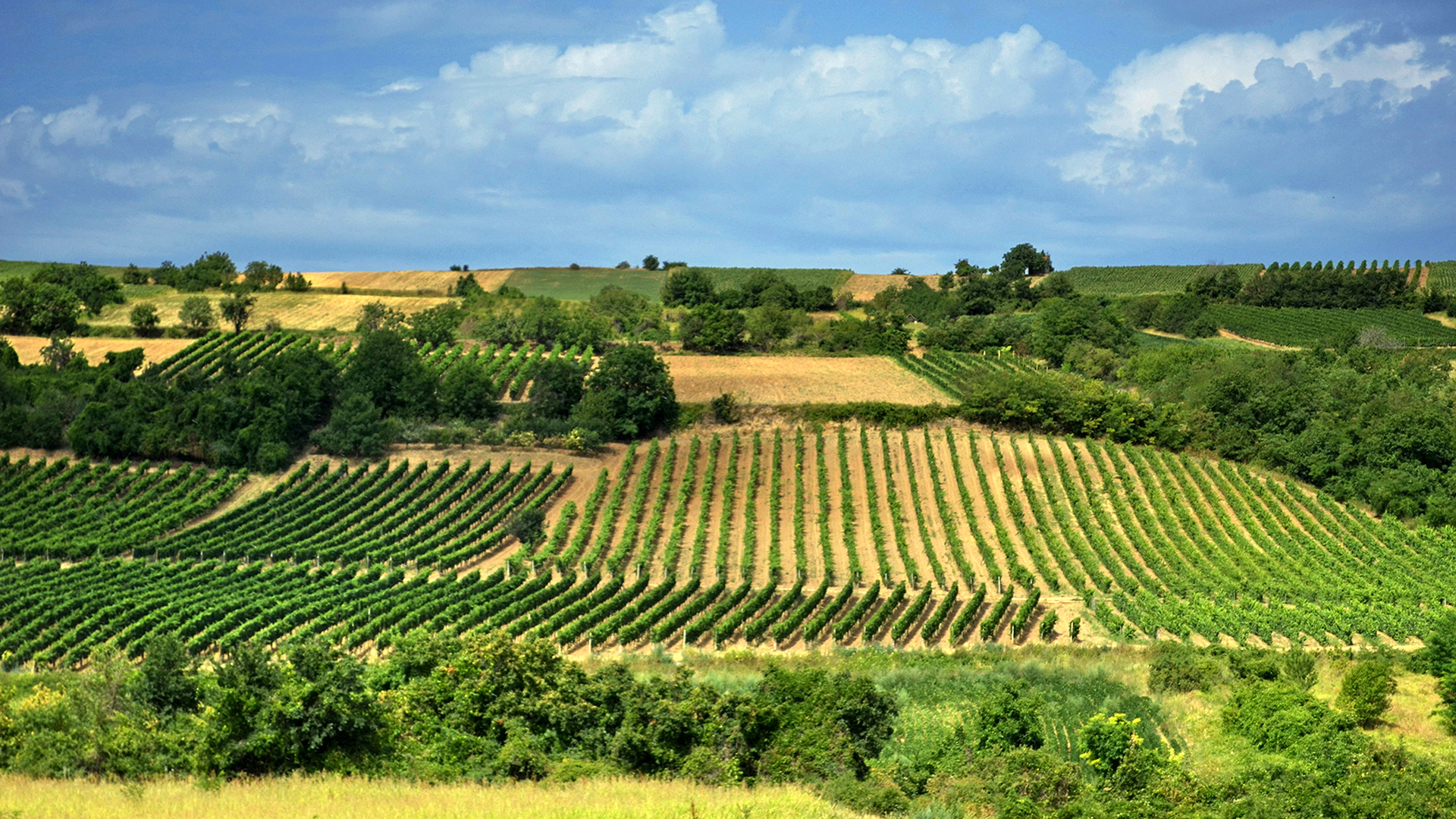
Vineyards in Fruška Gora; Serbia was the 11th largest wine producer in Europe and 19th in the world in 2014.

Serbia has very favourable natural conditions (land and climate) for varied agricultural production. It has 5,056,000 ha of agricultural land (0.7 ha per capita), out of which 3,294,000 ha is arable land (0.45 ha per capita). In 2024, Serbia exported agricultural and food products worth $5.3 billion. Agricultural exports constitute more than one-fifth of all Serbia's sales on the world market. Serbia is one of the largest provider of frozen fruit to the EU (largest to the French market, and second largest to the German market). Agricultural production is most prominent in Vojvodina on the fertile Pannonian Plain. Other agricultural regions include Mačva, Pomoravlje, Tamnava, Rasina, and Jablanica.

In the structure of the agricultural production 70% is from the crop field production, and 30% is from the livestock production. Serbia is world's second largest producer of plums (582,485 tons; second to China) and the third largest of raspberries (127,010 tons, trailing only Russia and the United States). It is also significant producer of maize (6.48 million tons, ranked 32nd in the world) and wheat (2.07 million tons, ranked 35th in the world). Other important agricultural products are: sunflower, sugar beet, soybean, potato, apple, mutton, pork meat, beef, poultry and dairy.

There are 56,000 ha of vineyards in Serbia, producing about 230 million litres of wine annually. Most famous viticulture regions are located in Vojvodina and Šumadija.

=== Energy ===
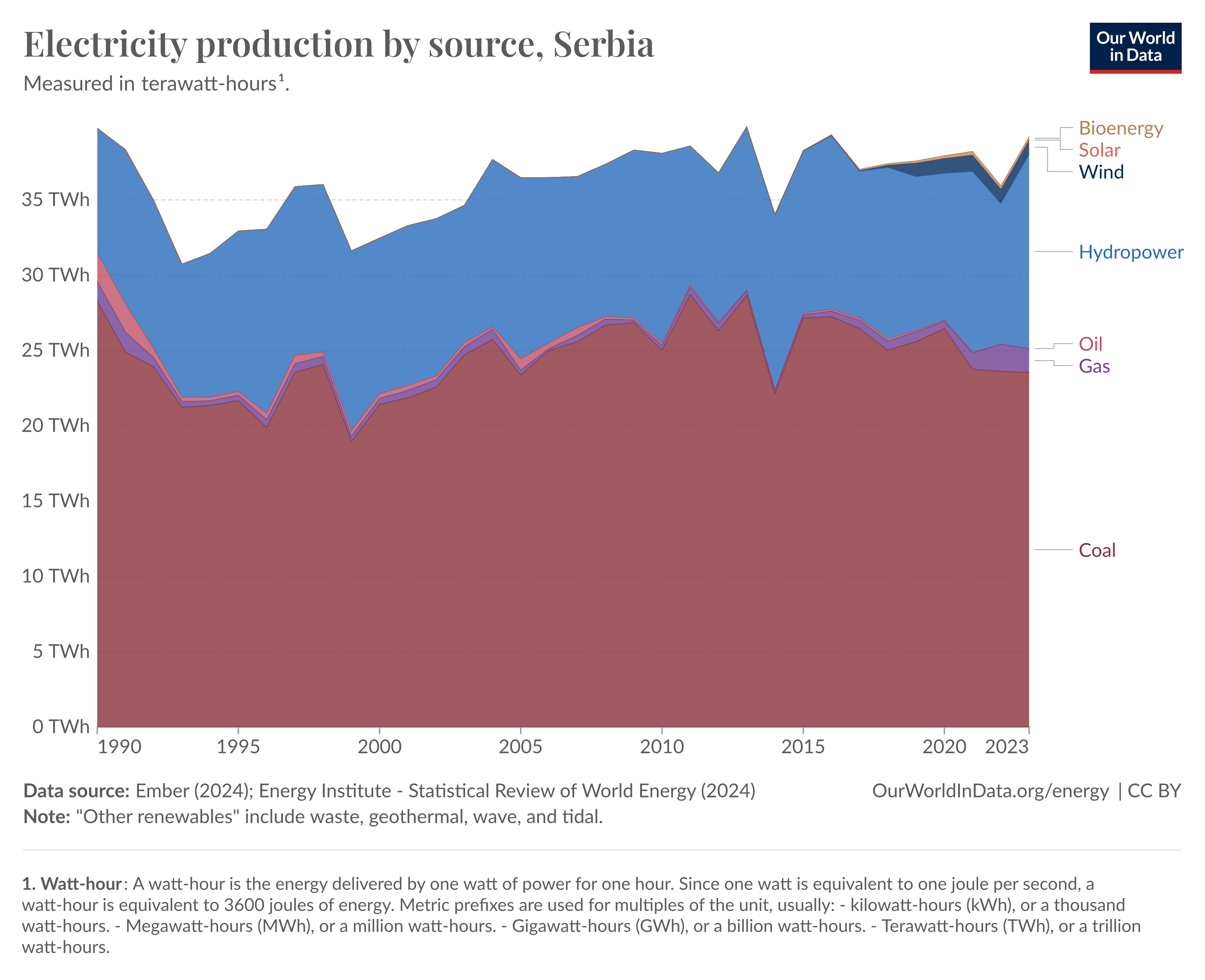
Serbia electricity production by source

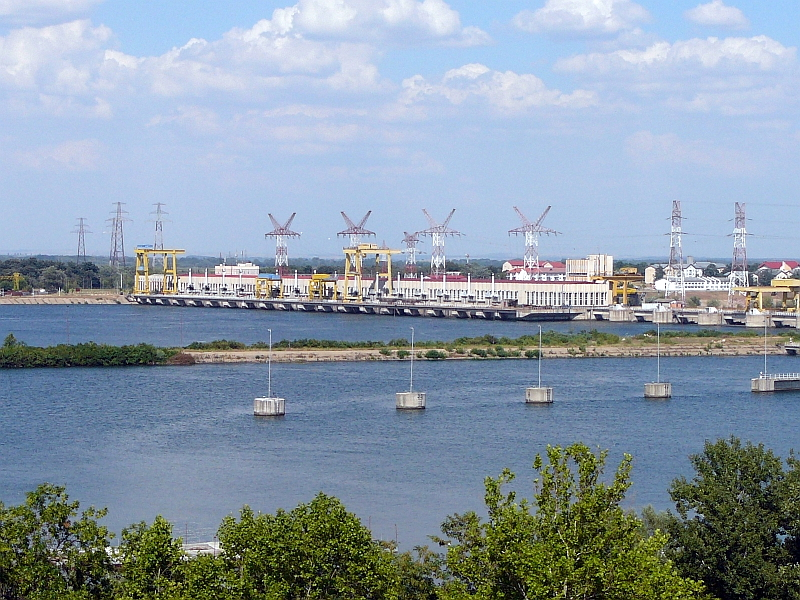
Đerdap 1 hydroelectric power station

The energy sector is one of the largest and most important sectors to the country's economy. Serbia is a net exporter of electricity and importer of key fuels (such as oil and gas).

Serbia has an abundance of coal, and significant reserves of oil and gas. Despite being small on a world scale, Serbia's oil and gas resources (77.4 million tons of oil equivalent and 48.1 billion cubic meters, respectively) have a certain regional importance since they are largest in the region of former Yugoslavia as well as the Balkans (excluding Romania). Almost 90% of the discovered oil and gas are to be found in Banat and those oil and gas fields are by size among the largest in the Pannonian basin but are average on a European scale.

The production of electricity in 2018 in Serbia was 38.3 billion kilowatt-hours (KWh), while the final electricity consumption amounted to 28.1 billion kilowatt-hours (KWh). Most of the electricity produced comes from thermal-power plants (71% of all electricity) and to a lesser degree from hydroelectric-power plants (24%) and wind energy (3%). There are 6 lignite-operated thermal-power plants with an installed power of 3,936 MW; largest of which are 1,502 MW-Nikola Tesla 1 and 1,160 MW-Nikola Tesla 2, both in Obrenovac. Total installed power of 9 hydroelectric-power plants is 2,831 MW, largest of which is Đerdap 1 with capacity of 1,026 MW. In addition to this, there are mazute and gas-operated thermal-power plants with an installed power of 353 MW. The entire production of electricity is concentrated in Elektroprivreda Srbije (EPS), public electric-utility power company.

The current oil production in Serbia amounts to over 1.1 million tons of oil equivalent and satisfies some 43% of country's needs while the rest is imported. National petrol company, Naftna Industrija Srbije (NIS), was acquired in 2008 by Gazprom Neft. The company's refinery in Pančevo (capacity of 4.8 million tons) is one of the most modern oil-refineries in Europe; it also operates network of 334 filling stations in Serbia (74% of domestic market) and additional 36 stations in Bosnia and Herzegovina, 31 in Bulgaria, and 28 in Romania. There are 155 kilometers of crude oil pipelines connecting Pančevo and Novi Sad refineries as a part of trans-national Adria oil pipeline.

Serbia is heavily dependent on foreign sources of natural gas, with only 17% coming from domestic production (totalling 491 million cubic meters in 2012) and the rest is imported, mainly from Russia (via the Balkan Stream gas pipelines that run through Ukraine and Hungary). Srbijagas, public company, operates the natural gas transportation system which consists of 3,177 kilometers of trunk and regional natural gas pipelines and a 450 million cubic meter underground gas storage facility at Banatski Dvor.

=== Industry ===
The industry is the economy sector that was the hardest hit by the UN sanctions and trade embargo and NATO bombing during the 1990s and transition to market economy during the 2000s. The industrial output saw dramatic downsizing: in 2013 it was expected to be only a half of that of 1989. Main industrial sectors include: automotive, mining, non-ferrous metals, food-processing, electronics, pharmaceuticals, clothes. Serbia has 14 free economic zones as of September 2017, in which many foreign direct investments are realized.

==== Automobile ====
Serbia's automotive industry (with Fiat Chrysler Automobiles as a forebearer) is dominated by cluster located in Kragujevac and its vicinity, and contributes to export with about $2 billion.

==== Defense ====
The defense industry of Serbia is the largest in the Western Balkans. Serbia's export of weapons and military equipment in 2021 was valued at $1.23 billion (€1.13 billion). It consists of around 200 companies, both public and private, working in many different fields. Serbian defense companies closely cooperate with the Military Technical Institute, country's top-level military scientific research institution, in developing new weapons, as well as with Serbian Armed Forces' Technical Testing Center, using its services for testing of new defense products. Universities and colleges in Serbia also participate through various contracts with the companies.

==== Electronics ====
Serbia's electronics industry had its peak in the 1980s and the industry today is only a third of what it was back then, but has witnessed a something of revival in last decade with investments of companies such as Siemens (wind turbines) in Subotica, Panasonic (lighting devices) in Svilajnac, and Gorenje (electrical home appliances) in Valjevo.

Serbia notably manufactures intel smartphones named Tesla smartphones.

==== Food ====
Serbia's food industry is well known both regionally and internationally and is one of the strong points of the economy. Some of the international brand-names established production in Serbia: PepsiCo and Nestlé in food-processing sector; Coca-Cola (Belgrade), Heineken (Novi Sad) and Carlsberg (Bačka Palanka) in beverage industry; Nordzucker in sugar industry.

==== Iron and steel ====
Serbia is a leading steel producer in the wider region of South Central Europe and had production of nearly 2 million tons of raw steel in 2018, coming entirely from Smederevo steel mill, owned by the Chinese Hesteel.

==== Mining ====
Serbia's mining industry is comparatively strong: Serbia's proven reserves of 5.5 billion tons of coal lignite are the 5th largest in the world (second in Europe, after Germany). Serbia is the 18th largest producer of coal (7th in Europe) and extracted from two large deposits: Kolubara (4 billion tons of reserves) and Kostolac (1.5 billion tons) as of 2011. The other smaller coal mines operate witin the PEU Resavica mining company.

Serbia is also world's 23rd largest (3rd in Europe) producer of copper which is extracted by Zijin Bor Copper, a large copper mining company, acquired by Chinese Zijin Mining in 2018; significant gold extraction is developed around Majdanpek.

==== Pharmaceutical ====
The pharmaceutical industry in Serbia comprises a dozen manufacturers of generic drugs, of which Hemofarm in Vršac and Galenika in Belgrade, account for 80% of production volume. Domestic production meets over 60% of the local demand.

=== Telecommunications and IT industry ===
Fixed telephone lines connect 89% of households in Serbia, and with about 8.82 million users the number of cellphones surpasses the total population of Serbia by 25%. The largest mobile operator is Telekom Srbija with 4.06 million subscribers, followed by Yettel Serbia with 2.73 million users and A1 Srbija with about 2.03 million. Some 58% of households have fixed-line (non-mobile) broadband Internet connection while 67% are provided with pay television services (i.e. 38% cable television, 17% IPTV, and 10% satellite). Digital television transition has been completed in 2015 with DVB-T2 standard for signal transmission.

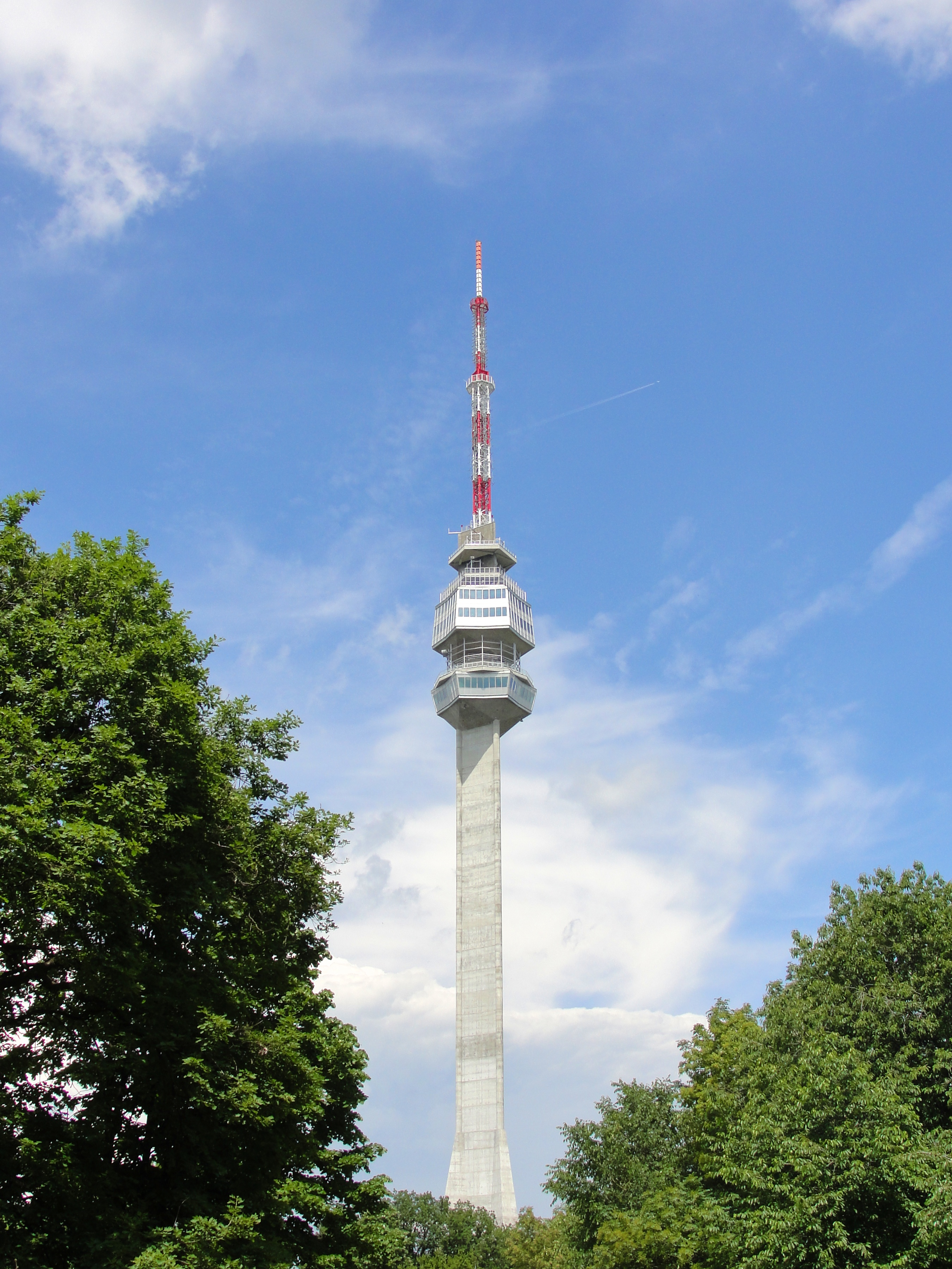
205 meters-high Avala Tower, 2010

The Serbian IT industry has grown into the country's largest export category. ICT services exports reached €4.13 billion in 2024, up from €3.44 billion in 2023 and €2.69 billion in 2022, having first crossed the €1 billion threshold in 2018, a roughly tenfold increase over the decade. The ICT sector contributes roughly 8.5% of GDP and employs about 115,000 people across more than 4,000 companies, with Belgrade, Novi Sad and Niš as the main hubs.

The Microsoft Development Center Serbia, opened in 2005, was the fifth such centre in the world at the time of its establishment and has become one of Microsoft's largest software engineering centres in Europe; a Microsoft Garage facility opened in Belgrade in 2025, only the second in Europe. Other major foreign IT employers include Cisco, IBM, Oracle, NCR Atleos, NCR Voyix, Endava, EPAM, Continental, Bosch, Schneider Electric, Huawei and Ubisoft. These companies have taken advantage of Serbia's large pool of software engineers and competitive wages relative to Western Europe.

Serbia also has a sizeable video-gaming cluster. Nordeus, the Belgrade-based developer of Top Eleven, was acquired by Take-Two Interactive in June 2021 for up to $378 million. Other notable studios include Mad Head Games (acquired by Saber Interactive), Eipix Entertainment (acquired by Playrix), Two Desperados, Playstudios Europe and Peaksel.

Large investments by global tech companies, such as Microsoft, typical of the 2000s, are being eclipsed by a growing number of domestic startups which obtain funding from domestic and international investors. What brought companies like Microsoft in the first place was a large pool of talented engineers and mathematicians. In just the first quarter of 2016, more than US$65 million has been raised by Serbian startups including $45 million for Seven Bridges (a Bioinformatics firm) and $14 million for Vast (a data analysis firm). One of the most successful startups have been Nordeus, which was founded in Belgrade in 2010, and is one of Europe's fastest-growing companies in the field of video games (the developer of Top Eleven Football Manager; a game played by over 20 million people).

=== Services ===
==== Banking and finance ====
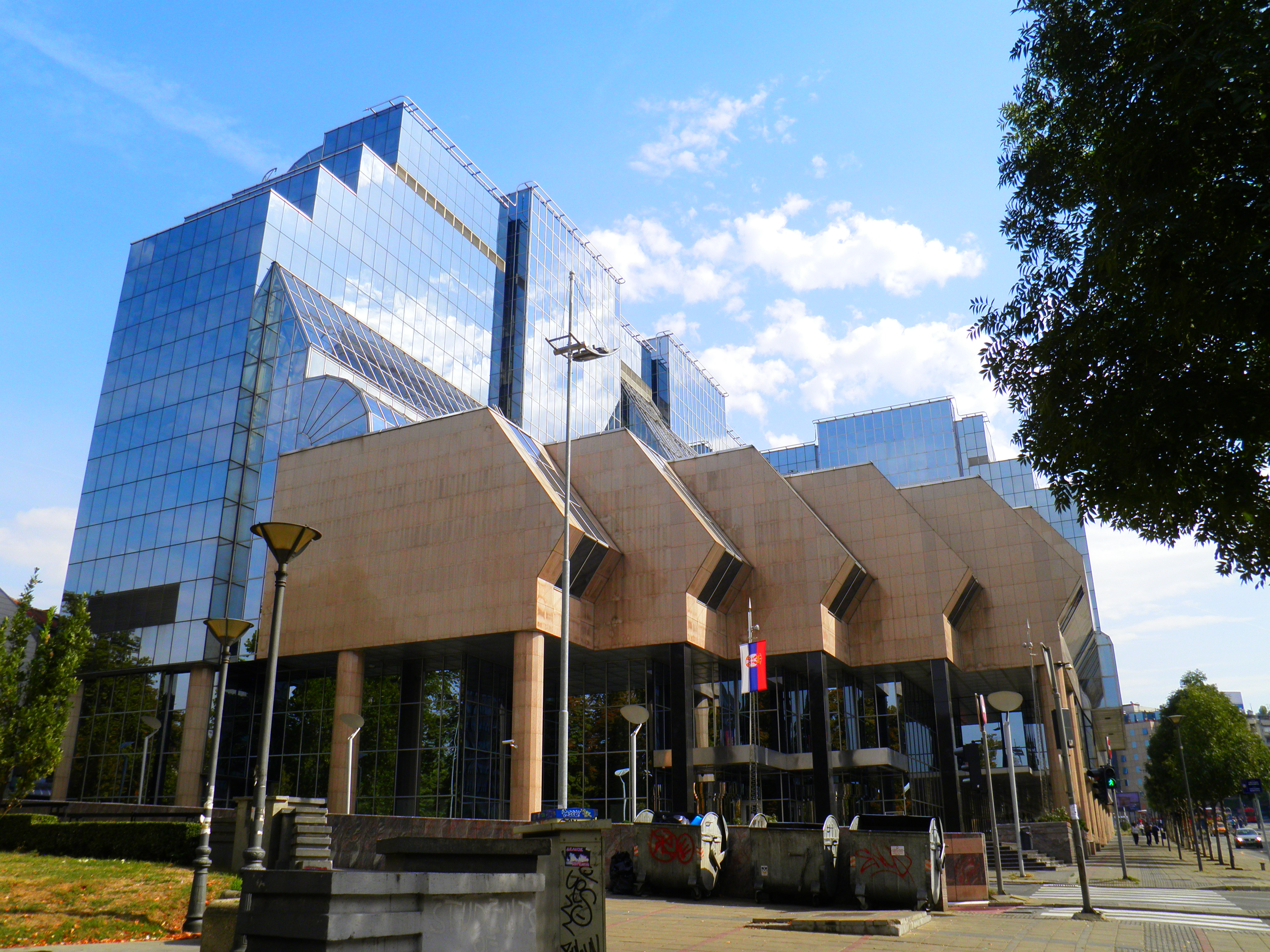
Headquarters of the National Bank of Serbia, Belgrade.

Banking in Serbia is regulated by the central bank in Serbia, the National Bank of Serbia. The mandate of the National Bank of Serbia is to contribute, without prejudice to its primary objective, to the maintenance and strengthening of the stability of the financial system and Economy of Serbia. To determine and implement measures and activities to that effect. Out of the total of 29 commercial banks, providing a wide array of banking services, 21 are in majority foreign ownership. Banks in Serbia are independent in their pursuit of profit-oriented business activities based on the principles of solvency, profitability, and liquidity. Every-day payment transactions are with a few exceptions, made in Serbian dinars, and one can use various types of credit cards (Visa, MasterCard, Diners, American Express). All major foreign currencies can be freely purchased and sold in exchange offices throughout the country. Many banks have automated teller machines, so, currency can be withdrawn at any time. Foreigners in Serbia, similar to the other countries, cannot get full service as in their home countries. While many banks have high ATM withdraw fees, few banks have lower fees.

==== Education ====
Education in Serbia is divided into preschool (predškolsko), primary school (osnovna škola), secondary school (srednja škola), and higher education levels. It is regulated by the Ministry of Education.

==== Healthcare ====
The healthcare system is managed by the National Health Insurance Fund (NHIF), which covers all citizens and permanent residents. All employees, self-employed persons, and pensioners must pay contributions to it. Contributions are based on a sliding scale, with wealthier members of society paying higher percentages of their income. Despite this, corruption still remains a serious problem due to low salaries, with many doctors demanding bribes in exchange for better treatment, although there is a major campaign against corruption from the government and NGOs.

As of 2014, the expenditure on health care in Serbia was 10.37% of GDP in 2014, US$1,312 per capita. Also, as of 2014, Serbia had 308 doctors per 100,000 people (360 per 100,000 people was the European Union (EU) average) and 628 non-doctoral medical staff per 100,000 people (1,199 per 100,000 people was the EU average). Although there is a trend toward a decreasing number of hospital beds per 100,000 people in Europe due to better efficiency and diagnostics, Serbia is among the countries in Europe with 552 hospital beds per 100,000 people. In terms of the availability of medical equipment, Serbia is slightly trailing behind the average of EU countries.

The Government of Serbia is working with the World Bank to improve the quality and efficiency of Serbia's healthcare system.

==== Tourism ====
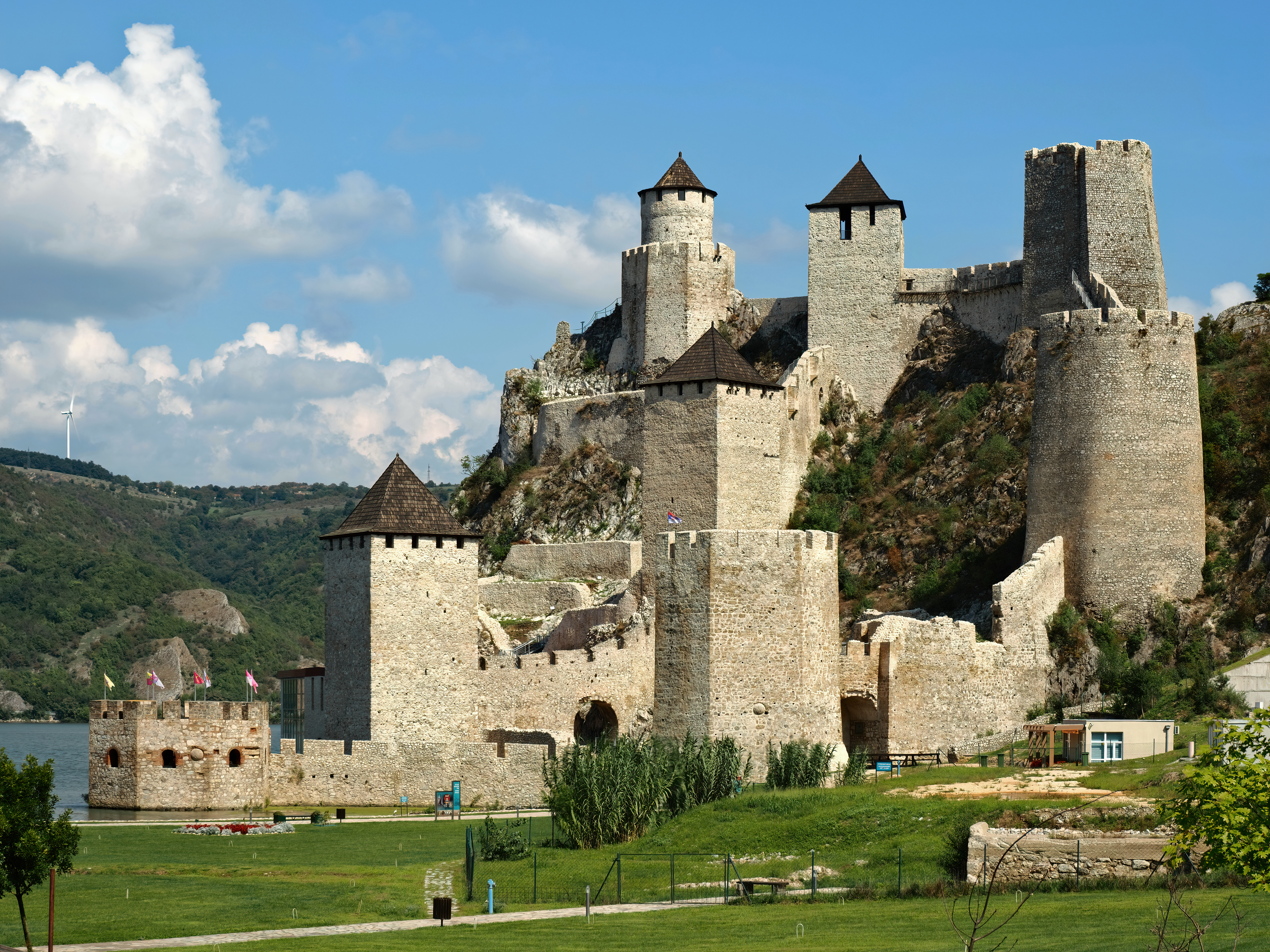
Golubac fortress

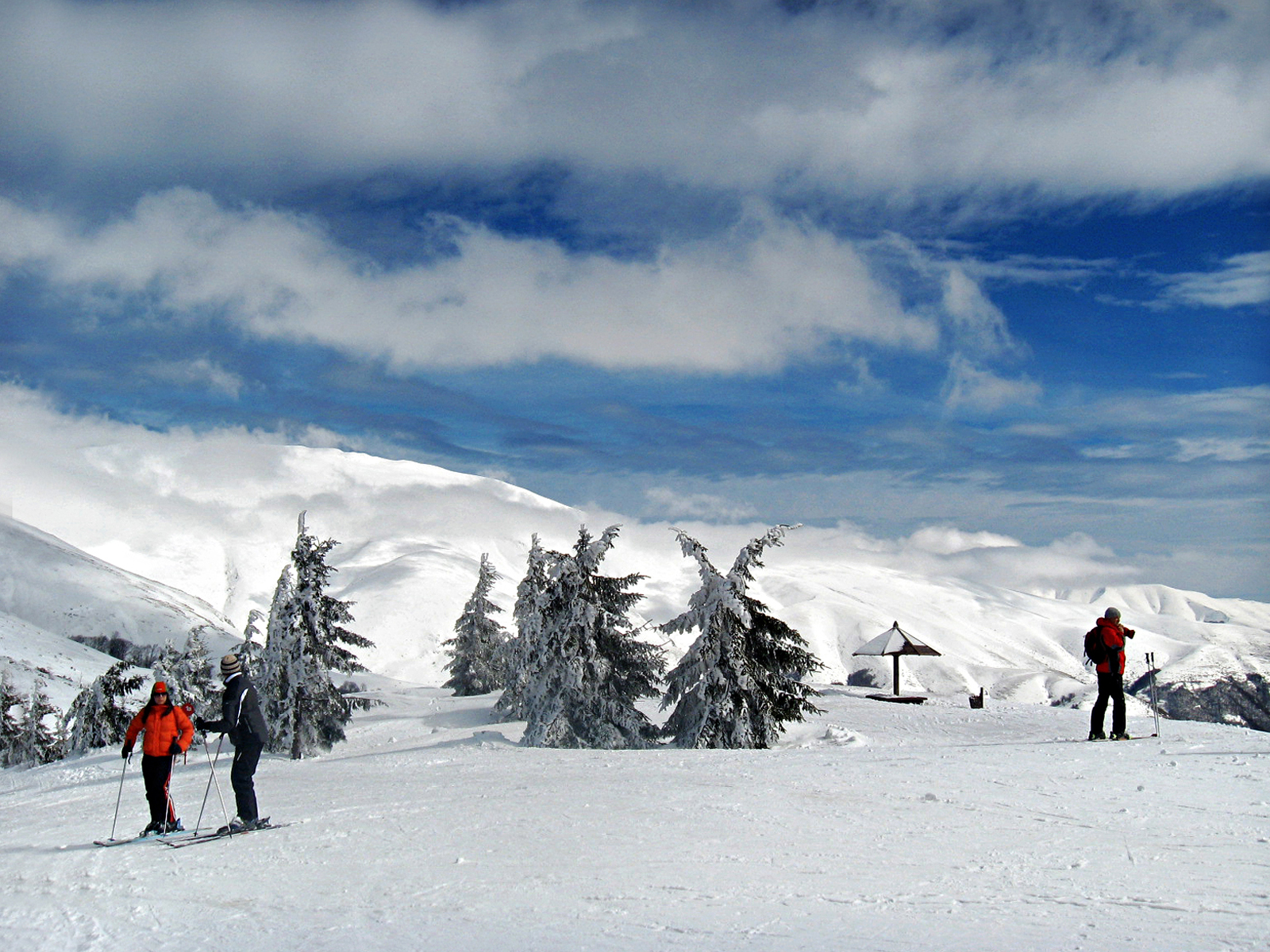
Stara planina

The touristic sector accounted for 1.4% of GDP in 2017 and employs some 75,000 people, about 3% of the country's workforce. Foreign exchange earnings from tourism in 2018 were estimated at $1.5 billion.

Serbia is not a mass-tourism destination but nevertheless has a diverse range of touristic products. In 2018, total of over 3.4 million tourists were recorded in accommodations, of which half were foreign.

Tourism is mainly focused on the mountains and spas of the country, which are mostly visited by domestic tourists, as well as Belgrade which is preferred choice of foreign tourists. The most famous mountain resorts are Kopaonik, Stara Planina, and Zlatibor. There are also many spas in Serbia, the biggest of which is Vrnjačka Banja, Soko Banja, and Banja Koviljača. City-break and conference tourism is developed in Belgrade (which was visited by 938,448 foreign tourists in 2018, more than a half of all international visits to the country) and to a lesser degree Novi Sad. Other touristic products that Serbia offer are natural wonders like Đavolja varoš, Christian pilgrimage to the many Orthodox monasteries across the country and the river cruising along the Danube. There are several internationally popular music festivals held in Serbia, such as EXIT (with 25–30,000 foreign visitors coming from 60 countries) and the Guča trumpet festival.

=== Transport ===
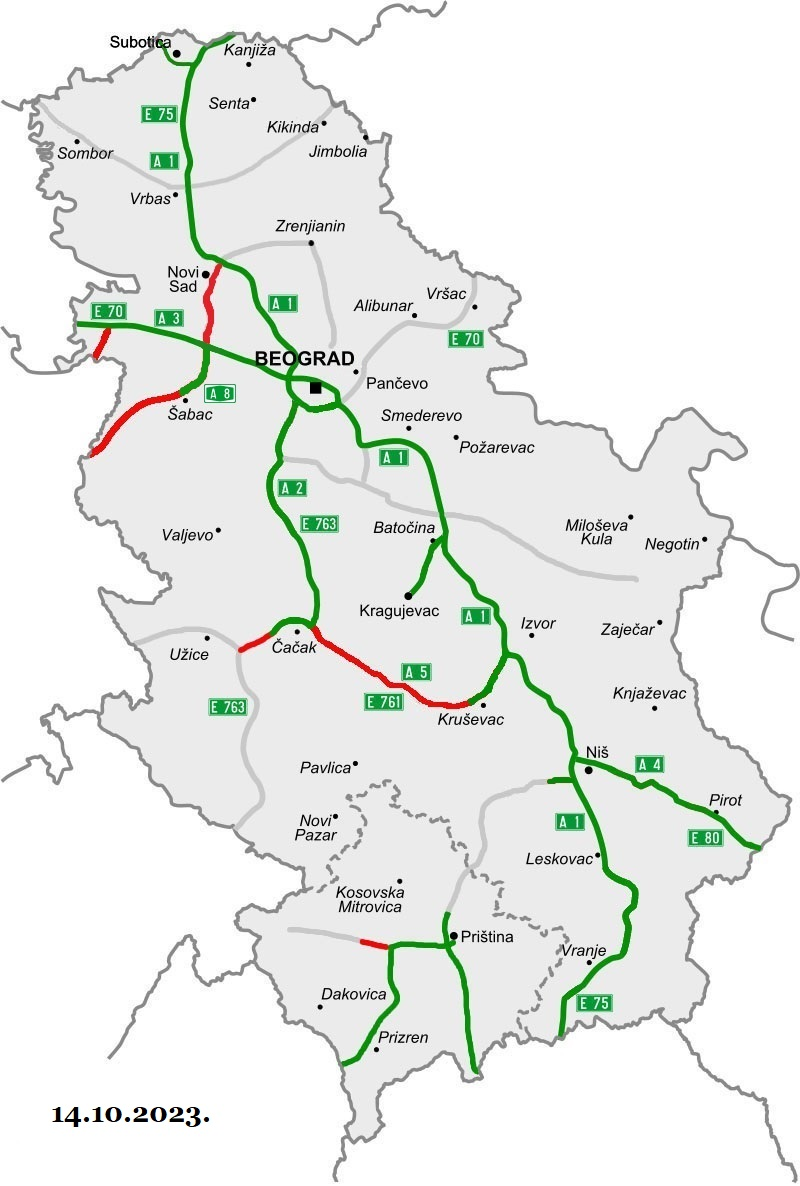
Map of motorways in Serbia

Serbia has a strategic transportation location since the country's backbone, Morava Valley, represents by far the easiest route of land travel from continental Europe to Asia Minor and the Near East.

Serbian road network carries the bulk of traffic in the country. Total length of roads is 45,419 km of which 915 km are "class-Ia state roads" (i.e. motorways); 4,481 km are "class-Ib state roads" (national roads); 10,941 km are "class-II state roads" (regional roads) and 23,780 km are "municipal roads". The road network, except for the most of class-Ia roads, are of comparatively high quality to the Western European standards because of huge financial investments Serbias has been seeing in the last 10 years.

Over 300 kilometers of new motorways has been constructed in the last decade and additional 142 kilometers are currently under construction: A5 motorway (from north of Kruševac to Čačak) and 30 km-long segment of A2 (between Čačak and Požega). Coach transport is very extensive: almost every place in the country is connected by bus, from largest cities to the villages; in addition there are international routes (mainly to countries of Western Europe with small Serb diaspora). Routes, both domestic and international, are served by more than 100 bus companies, biggest of which are Lasta and Niš-Ekspres. As of 2018, there were 1,959,584 registered passenger cars or 1 passenger car per 3.5 inhabitants.

Serbia has 3,819 kilometers of rail tracks, of which 1,279 are electrified and 283 kilometers are double-track railroad. The major rail hub is Belgrade (and to a lesser degree Niš), while the most important railroads include: Belgrade–Bar (Montenegro), Belgrade–Šid–Zagreb (Croatia)/Belgrade–Niš–Sofia (Bulgaria) (part of Pan-European Corridor X), Belgrade–Subotica–Budapest (Hungary) and Niš–Thessaloniki (Greece). Although still a major mode of freight transportation, railroads face increasing problems with the maintenance of the infrastructure and lowering speeds. The rail services are operated by Srbija Voz (passenger transport) and Srbija Kargo (freight transport).

There are three airports with regular passenger traffic. Belgrade Nikola Tesla Airport served 5.6 million passengers in 2018 and is a hub of flagship carrier Air Serbia which carried some 2.5 million passengers in 2018. Niš Constantine the Great Airport is mainly catering low-cost airlines. Morava Airport is currently only served by Air Serbia.

Serbia has a developed inland water transport since there are 1,716 kilometers of navigable inland waterways (1,043 km of navigable rivers and 673 km of navigable canals), which are almost all located in northern third of the country. The most important inland waterway is the Danube (part of Pan-European Corridor VII). Other navigable rivers include Sava, Tisza, Begej and Timiş River, all of which connect Serbia with Northern and Western Europe through the Rhine–Main–Danube Canal and North Sea route, to Central Europe via the Tisza, Begej and Danube Black Sea routes, and to Southern Europe via the Sava river. More than 2 million tons of cargo were transported on Serbian rivers and canals in 2016 while the largest river ports are: Novi Sad, Belgrade, Pančevo, Smederevo, Prahovo and Šabac.

== External trade ==
Exports of Serbia by product category (2019) Chemical products Transportation Machines Mineral products Plastics and rubbers Metals Foodstuffs Precious metals Textiles Instruments Animal products Vegetable products Paper goods Footwear and headwear Miscellaneous Stone and glass Wood products Animal and vegetable bi-products Animal hides Arts and antiques Weapons

Serbia has a wide range of free trade agreements with foreign countries and trading blocs. Serbia signed a free trade agreement with the European Union in 2008 enabling exports of all products originating from Serbia without customs and other fees. For a limited number of products (baby beef, sugar, and wine), annual import quotas remain in effect. As of 2016, the EU countries were the largest trading partners of Serbia with 64.4% of country's total foreign trade.

Serbia signed the CEFTA, which allows exports of all products originating from Serbia without customs and other fees to the neighbouring countries: Albania, Bosnia and Herzegovina, North Macedonia, Moldova, Montenegro and Kosovo. In 2016, the CEFTA countries were the second largest trading partners of Serbia.

Serbia signed a free trade agreement with EFTA members (Switzerland, Norway, Iceland) in 2009.

The Serbian free-trade agreement with Russia was implemented since 2000; for a limited number of products, annual import quotas remain in effect. Free-trade agreement with Turkey has been implemented since 2010. Trade with the United States is pursued under the Generalized System of Preferences (GSP) with a preferential duty-free entry for approximately 4,650 products.

Serbia signed a free trade agreement with China in October 2023, after six years of negotiations.

External trade
Year	2000	2002	2004	2006	2008	2010	2011	2012	2013	2014	2015	2016	2017	2018	2019	2020	2021	2022	2023	2024	2025
Exports (mil. USD):	1,558	2,074	3,523	6,431	10,974	9,794	11,780	11,353	14,614	14,843	13,379	14,883	16,992	19,227	19,630	19,501	25,563	29,059	30,934	33,038	37,320
Imports (mil. USD):	5,614	5,614	10,755	13,174	24,332	16,471	19,862	19,014	20,543	20,650	18,218	19,247	21,946	25,883	26,730	26,233	33,797	41,154	39,837	42,263	47,231
Balance (mil. USD):	-1,772	-3,540	-7,232	-6,743	-13,358	-6,677	-8,082	-7,661	-5,929	-5,806	-4,839	-4,363	-4,954	-6,657	-7,101	-6,733	-8,234	-12,095	-8,903	-9,225	-9,910
Exports/Imports (%):	46.8	36.9	32.8	48.8	45.1	59.5	59.3	59.7	71.1	71.9	73.4	78.8	77.4	74.3	73.4	74.3	76.4	70.6	77.7	78.2	79.0
Source: Statistical Office of Serbia

== Foreign direct investments ==
Attracting foreign direct investments is set as a priority for the government of Serbia, which provides both financial and tax incentives to companies willing to invest. Leading investor nations in Serbia include: Germany, Italy, United States, China, Austria, Norway, and Greece. Majority of FDI went into automotive industry, food and beverage industry, machinery, textile and clothing. Foreign direct investments (FDI) coming from the EU accounted for more than 63% of total FDI coming to Serbia from the period of 2010 until 2021.

Blue-chip corporations making investments in manufacturing sector include: Fiat Chrysler Automobiles, Bosch, Michelin, Siemens, Panasonic, Continental, Schneider Electric, Philip Morris, Holcim, PepsiCo, Coca-Cola, Carlsberg and others. In the energy sector, Russian energy giants, Lukoil and Gazprom have made large investments. In metallurgy sector, Chinese steel and copper giants, Hesteel and Zijin Mining have acquired steel mill in Smederevo and copper mining complex in Bor, respectively. The financial sector has attracted investments from Italian banks such as Intesa Sanpaolo and UniCredit, Crédit Agricole and Société Générale from France, Erste Bank and Raiffeisen from Austria, among others. ICT and telecommunications saw investments from likes such as Microsoft, Telenor, Telekom Austria, and NCR. In retail sector, biggest foreign investors are Dutch Ahold Delhaize, German Metro AG and Schwarz Gruppe, Greek Veropoulos, and Croatian Fortenova.

Foreign direct investments
Year	2000	2002	2003	2004	2005	2006	2007	2008	2009	2010	2011	2012	2013	2014	2015	2016	2017	2018	2019	2020	2021	2022
Total (mil. USD)	54	546	1,511	1,077	1,579	5,663	4,389	3,407	2,729	1,549	3,018	2,629	1,518	1,550	2,114	2,080	2,867	3,984	4,605	3,638	4,433	4,709
Per capita (USD)	7.2	72.8	202.0	144.3	212.2	764.0	594.6	461.5	372.8	212.5	415.8	365.2	211.9	216.7	297.7	292.9	320.6	569.1	602.3	552.3	644.6	703.8
Source: Development Agency of Serbia National Bank of Serbia

== Economic indicators ==
The following table shows the main economic indicators

Year	GDP (in Bil. US$ PPP)	GDP per capita (in US$ PPP)	GDP (in Bil. EUR nominal)	GDP per capita (in EUR nominal)	GDP (in Bil. US$ nominal)	GDP per capita (in US$ nominal)	GDP GROWTH (REAL IN %)	TOTAL INVESTMENT(IN % GDP)	Foreign direct investments (bln. USD)	Foreign direct investments (bln. EUR)	Inflation (in %)	Exchange rate (to 1 EUR)	Exchange rate (to US$1)	Unemployment rate (in %)	Employment rate (in %)	Employment registered (person)	Labor force (in number)	Labor force (unemployed persons )	Foreign exchange reserves(Central bank (bln. EUR))	Foreign exchange reserves( Comm. banks (bln. EUR))	Foreign exchange reserves(Total (bln. EUR) )	Gold Reserves (Total (T Gold ) )	Trade Exports (Exports ((mil. USD))	Trade Imports (Imports ((mil. USD))	Trade Balance (Imports ((mil. USD))	External trade (Exports/Imports (%))	Government debt (% GDP)	Minimum net salary (in EUR)	Median net salary (50% emoyees) (in EUR)	Average net salary (in EUR)	Average gross salary (in EUR)
2000	$47.5	$6.313.275	28.5	€2.650	9.3	$1.239.745	7.759%	10.720%	$54		70.000%	61.51	58.98	12.100%	32.3%		3.569.895		€0.55	€0.39	€0.95		1,558	5,614	-1,772	46.8%	201.2%			€101	€?
2001	$49.5	$6.789.478	14.6	€2.840	12.3	$1.642.080	4.993%	19.350%	$501		80.744%	65.5	58.95	12.200%	41.4%		3.550.875		€0.61	€0.51	€0.98					49.8%	36.9%			€102	€?
2002	$55.4	$7.389.302	18.2	€3.020	16.2	$2.158.378	7.116%	21.367%	$546		8.868%	78.89	57.94	14.470%	43.5%		3.535.725		€2.19	€0.68	€2.86		2,074	5,614	-3,540	36.9%	68.3%	€92		€152	€?
2003	$59.0	$7.888.299	19.9	€3.160	21.2	$2.838.501	4.415%	22.311%	$1,511		2.901%	79.23	58,85	16.000%	43.5%		3.522.846		€2.36	€0.69	€3.20					34.5%	55.6%	€105		€177	€?
2004	$66.1	$8.853.456	21.0	€3.460	24.8	$3,317.624	9.047%	30.104%	$1,077		10.602%	78.89	59.98	19.530%	43.6%		3.497.569		€3.10	€0.59	€3.70		3,523	10,755	-7,232	32.8%	52.6%	€124		€194	€?
2005	$75.1	$10.088.561	22.3	€3.660	27.5	$3.697.899	10.154%	22.541%	$1,579		16.253%	79.00	62.90	21.830%	43.8%		3.369.669		€3.23	€0.62	€3.80					33.2%	51.6%	€126		€210	€?
2006	$81.3	$10.974.129	25.9	€3.860	32.6	$4.401.870	5.108%	21.762%	$5,663		10.732%	88.60	66.73	21.560%	43.8%		3.211.965		€9.02	€0.52	€9.54		6,431	13,174	-6,743	48.8%	52.6%	€145		€258	€?
2007	$88.9	$12.045.218	31.6	€4.130	43.4	$5.882.939	6.440%	25.070%	$4,389		6.002%	95.89	79.28	18.800%	47.5%		3.204.276		€8.16	€0.52	€9.08					45.1%	35.9%	€188		€347	€?
2008	$95.7	$13.025.828	35.7	€4.380	52.1	$7.092.355	5.656%	26.522%	$3,407		12.411%	105.50	80.87	14.400%	48.8%		3.229.170		€10.60	€0.92	€12.03		10,974	24,332	-13,358	59.5%	28.3%	€233		€401	€?
2009	$93.7	$12.802.431	32.5	€4.280	45.2	$6.172.494	-2.732%	18.737%	$2,729		8.117%	104.64	86.18	16.900%	48.8%		3.074.965		€10.00	€1.42	€11.69					59.3%	32.8%	€220		€338	€?
2010	$95.5	$13.103.603	31.5	€4.330	41.4	$5.677.545	0.731%	18.380%	$1,549		6.143%	105.50	83.13	20.000%	46.5%		2.931.478		€12.06	€1.68	€12.87			16,471	-6,677	59.7%	41.8%	€203		€330	€468
2011	$99.5	$13.751.806	35.4	€4.450	49.3	$6.814.650	2.036%	19.217%	$3,018		11.137%	113.72	83.13	23.600%	44.3%		2.883.187		€10.91	€0.80	€11.97		11,780	19,862	-8,082	71.1%	45.4%	€234	€250	€372	€521
2012	$100.4	$13.938.823	33.7	€4.440	43.3	$6.016.788	-0.682%	17.317%	$2,629		7.330%	114.64	99.46	24.600%	43.5%		2.888.489		€11.19	€0.91	€12.10	15 T	11,353	19,014	-7,661	71.9%	56.2%	€236		€366	€555
2013	$104.9	$14.634.218	36.4	€4.590	48.4	$6.757.467	2.893%	16.715%	$1,518		7.694%	120.96	111.25	23.000%	42.8%		2.982.216		€9.91	€0.91	€11.64		14,614	20,543	-5,929	73.4%	59.6%	€232	€294	€388	€597
2014	$104.6	$14.667.214	35.5	€4.540	47.1	$6.603.499	-1.590%	18.681%	$1,550		2.082%	121.63	117.13	19.894%	43.5%		3.175.885		€10.38	€1.73	€12.11		14,843	20,650	-5,806	70.4%	70.4%	€235		€380	€585
2015	$106.0	$14.932.417	35.7	€4.640	39.7	$5.588.980	1.776%	18.078%	$2,114		1.392%	123.47	103.39	18.231%	44.1%	1.989.617	3.136.661		€10.20	€1.43	€11.81		13,379	18,218	-4,839	78.8%	74.7%	€236		€368	€603
2016	$111.9	$15.856.452	36.8	€4.820	40.7	$5.765.204	3.339%	19.575%	$2,080		1.122%	118.45	104.92	15.917%	44.1%	2.009.785	3.227.121		€9.96	€1.56	€11.52		14,883	19,247	-4,363	77.4%	71.9%	€230	€302	€375	€627
2017	$116.7	$16.621.467	39.2	€4.950	44.2	$6.292.547	2.101%	22.655%	$2,867		3.131%	118.19	104.55	14.051%	45.8%	2.062.588	3.252.029		€11.26	€1.11	€11.76		16,992	21,946	-4,954	74.3%	61.5%	€238		€395	€638
2018	$124.9	$17.880.955	42.9	€5.200	50.6	$7.252.404	4.495%	25.104%	$3,984	€3,496	1.960%	117.59	101.92	13.273%	46.5%	2.131.079	3.268.748		€11.88	€1.63	€12.92		19,227	25,883	-6,657	73.4%	53.8%	€239		€421	€678
2019	$132.5	$19.025.432	46.0	€5.460	51.5	$7.391.841	4.249%	23.173%	$4,605	€3,815	1.850%	117.45	101.98	10.909%	47.7%	2.173.135	3.260.591		€12.55	€1.81	€14.36		19,630	26,730	-7,101	74.3%	56.7%	€240		€466	€700
2020	$132.8	$19.168.069	49.024	€7106	55.948	$8109	-1%	24.414%	$3,638	€3,039	1.575%	117.20	104.58	9.457%	47.8%	2.215.475	3.196.753		€12.88	€1.90	€14.78		19,501	26,233	-6,733	75.5%	56.9%	€251	€416	€511	€871
2021	$148.7	$21.774.030	55.931	€8184	66.096	$9671	7.9%	25.011%	$4,433	€3,863	4.085%	117.22	103.61	10.093%	50.0%	2.273.591	3.176.077		€13.90	€2.55	€16.45	37.2 T	$25,563	$33,797	$-8,234	76.4%	56.5%	€255	€455	€635	€920
2022	$163.7	$23.919.000	63.501	€9528	66.679	$10005	2.6%	26.780%	$4,709	€4,416	11.982%	117,67	110,48	9.885%	50.9%	2.308.955	3.167.119		€16.20	€3.21	€19.416	38.5 T	$29,058	$41,148	$-12,090	70.6%	52.1%	€302	€516	€717	€1002
2023	$182.3	$27,575	75.204	€11355	81.334	$12280	3.8%	22.7%	$4,940	€4,532	12.1%	117,54	107,72	9.1%	50.5%	2 870 200	3 158 300	299 100	€20.25	€3.36	€23.624	38.47 T	30,934$	$39,837	$-8,903	77.7%	48.3%	€341	595€	811€	1111 €
2024	$203.871	$31001.21	€79.33	€12025.97	$89.074	$13544.907	3.878%	24.053%	5.270$	€5.067	4.67%	117.3659	112.7759	8.575%	51.9%	2 894 900	3 168 000	273 100	€24,456.9	€3,831.1	€28704.6	47.26 T	29194.9$	$38543.6	-$9348	75.7%	48.609%	426.24€	€663.08	856€	€1200
2025	$213.791	$32741.87	84.89B €	€13610	100.048B $	$15322.201	2.376%	24.856%	$4,130	€3.500	4.53%	117,2820	99,9165	8.615%	51.3%	2 869 500	3 112 300	276 300	24.636B $	$4.364	29 B$	53.0 T	51,9B €	47.7B €	-4.2B €	91.9%	44.500%	€460	€773.46	1056.81 €	€1447.14

International Monetary Fund (IMF)ПОЧЕТНА | Републички завод за статистику СрбијеНародна банка СрбијеWorld Bank Group - International Development, Poverty and Sustainability

== Labour ==
In 2024, the labour force was estimated at 3,169,200 and employment stood at 2,897,500 persons (formal employment amounted to 2,548,800 while informal was at 348,700). Employment rate (among population aged 15 and over) is comparatively low and stood at 51.4%; of those employed 12.84% worked in agriculture, 23.02% in industry, and 64.14% in services in 2024. The unemployment rate has been in double digits throughout the post-socialist era, reaching its peak at 25.9% in 2012. Since then, the rate has decreased substantially, with the creation of new jobs in primarily private sector, reaching 8.6% in 2024.

Note: districts in purple on the map had unemployment rate in 2024 - below 8%, blue in the range of 8% – 10%, orange in the range of 10% – 20%; and red – 20% and over.

According to the latest monthly report of the Statistical Office of the Republic of Serbia, the average monthly salary in December 2025 amounted to salary 169,921 RSD (1,447 euros) gross or 124,089 RSD (1057 euros) net. The median net salary amounted to 90,819 RSD (777 euros), meaning that 50% of employees realised wages and salaries up to the mentioned amount.

The employer is also liable to pay for additional social security contributions which brings the total labour cost for the average salary to 150,107 Serbian dinars (1,280 euros), thus the total tax ratio amounts to 26.9%. The map below shows average salaries by region in December 2025, expressed in gross terms in order to make the data comparable to the data that is published by Eurostat. Due to the nature of Serbia's economy, the majority of people working in Serbia work under the so-called "entrepreneurship" salary. This category of worker is seen in local markets, for examples, plumbers, and a variety of occupations. The majority of people working in the IT are also entrepreneurs, and entrepreneurs' tax contribution will not exceed the maximum amount of 10% of their salary. The average tax contribution is from €80 to €250 a month (depending on the location registered in Serbia), which is between 0.0042% to 2% of tax when compared to the max amount of income allowed under the entrepreneurship bracket. This makes Serbia one of the best countries for entrepreneurship in Europe, with lowest income tax rate in Europe.

Note: districts in purple on the map had gross average monthly salary in January 2026 – €1400 and over, blue in the range of €1250 – €1399; orange in the range of €1100 – €1249 and red – below €1099.

List of top 10 cities and municipalities (Note: excluding city municipalities) by average net salary (April 2026)

Rank	City / municipality	Net salary (€)
1	Bor	1,285
1	Belgrade	1,281
3	Novi Sad	1,183
4	Smederevo	1,168
5	Pančevo	1,041
6	Kostolac	1,033
7	Niš	1011
8	Kragujevac	995
9	Inđija	988
10	Lučani	985

== Regional economies ==
The list includes statistical regions of Serbia by GDP, share of total GDP and GDP per capita & average gross salary in 2024:

Rank	Region	Total GDP (Million €)	Share of total GDP	GDP per capita (€)	GDP per capita (Level Indices)
1	Belgrade Region	35,963	43.2%	21,309	169
2	Vojvodina	20,093	24.1%	11,613	92.1
3	Šumadija and Western Serbia	14,468	17.4%	8,034	63.7
4	Southern and Eastern Serbia	12,740	15.3%	9,185	72.9

== Companies ==
The list includes ten largest Serbian companies by net income in 2024 (net income and employees figures without subsidiaries):

Rank	Company	Headquarters	Industry	Net income (Mil€. )	Employees
1	Zijin Mining Bor	Bor	Mining	713	1,284
2	Zijin Bor Copper	Bor	Mining	251	5,966
3	EPS	Belgrade	Electric utility	208	19,203
4	NIS	Novi Sad	Petroleum	156	5,161
5	Telekom Srbija	Belgrade	Telecommunications	85	8,689
6	Yettel Serbia	Belgrade	Telecommunications	84	1883
7	Srbijagas	Novi Sad	Energy	71	919
8	JCHX Kinsey Mining Construction	Bor	Mining	70	1273
9	Belgrade Waterfront DOO	Belgrade	Construction	64	103
10	Delhaize Serbia	Belgrade	Consumer services	63	12,412

== See also ==
- Economy of Belgrade
- List of companies of Serbia
- List of Serbian regions by GDP
- List of Serbs by net worth
- Corruption in Serbia
- Ministry of Construction, Transport, and Infrastructure (Serbia)
- Ministry of Economy (Serbia)
- Ministry of Finance (Serbia)
- Ministry of Labour, Employment, Veteran and Social Policy (Serbia)
- Ministry for Public Investments (Serbia)
- National Bank of Serbia
- Kopaonik Business Forum
- NALED Serbia
- Serbia and the World Bank
- Serbia and the International Monetary Fund
- Taxation in Serbia
- Economy of Europe
