= Belgrade IT sector =

Serbian technological center

The IT sector of Belgrade is the concentration of information technology centers and service providers in the Serbian Capital of Belgrade, comprising 6,924 companies as of 2013. The IT sector in Serbia is projected to become largest sector of the Serbian economy.

Microsoft, Huawei, and Kaspersky have opened development centers Belgrade. Microsoft Development Center Serbia was, at the time of its establishment, the fifth such center in the world. Other global IT companies that choose Belgrade for their regional or European center include Asus, Intel, Dell, Huawei, and NCR. These major investments generated over €678.3 million in Serbia's exports in 2015.

== Startup community ==
Nordeus, a local video game startup, is one of Europe's fastest-growing gaming companies. In five years of operation, Nordeus has grown to over 150 employees and €64 million of yearly sales.

Another local startup, FishingBooker, was founded in 2013 and now employs over 90 people. FishingBooker has been described as "the world’s largest online travel company that enables [users] to find and book fishing trips." Like Nordeus, FishingBooker, is a bootstrapped startup.

In the first quarter of 2016, more than US$65 million has been raised by Serbian startups including US$45 million for Seven Bridges (a Bioinformatics firm) and US$14 million for Vast (a data analysis firm). Also in 2016, a Belgrade-based website AskGamblers which generates over €810,000 in revenue and €620,000 in profits was sold to Catena Media for €15 million.

The startup community is supported by a non-profit organization called Startit which acts as an incubator for new companies. Startit raised US$108,000 from its Kickstarter campaign in 2015, allowing it to expand its Belgrade center, build a second center in Inđija (completed in February 2016), and expand further to other cities with strong IT industry: Novi Sad, Zrenjanin, Vršac, Subotica, Šabac. Other developments include an agriculture drone startup that uses drones for land surveying, TeleSkin an app which can identify and track skin cancer and there was another successful Kickstarter for Hexiwear a customizable smartwatch for developers.

== Notable companies ==
This is a list of some of the most notable companies in the sector are (ordered by revenue, as of 2024):

Column	Explanation
Name	Company's full legal name
Capital	Majority beneficial owner origin
Employees	Average number of employees working at the company in given fiscal year
Revenue	Amount of total revenue of company in million euros in given fiscal year

Name	Capital	Employees	Revenue
Smart Business Technologies d.o.o. Beograd	(Russia)	1,806	287.78 million
HTEC d.o.o. Beograd	(Serbia)	1,084	137.22 million
Comtrade System Integration d.o.o. Beograd	(Serbia)	449	113.24 million
Microsoft Software d.o.o. Beograd	(United States)	707	111.35 million
Schneider Electric d.o.o. Novi Sad	(France)	1,016	78.51 million
ASEE Solutions d.o.o. Beograd	(Poland)	573	68.91 million
SAP West Balkans d.o.o. Beograd	(Germany)	278	65.29 million
Luxoft d.o.o. Beograd	(Switzerland)	975	62.20 million
Endava d.o.o. Beograd	(United Kingdom)	721	51.58 million
AIGO BS d.o.o. Beograd	(Serbia)	136	49.50 million
Orion Innovation d.o.o. Beograd	(Switzerland)	750	48.99 million
GL Trade Software d.o.o. Beograd	(France)	753	47.65 million
Playrix RS d.o.o. Beograd	(Cyprus)	527	46.92 million
EPAM Systems d.o.o. Beograd	(Netherlands)	656	45.91 million
KHAOTICEN d.o.o. Beograd	(Serbia)	58	44.19 million
Vega IT d.o.o. Novi Sad	(Serbia)	352	43.40 million
eFront d.o.o. Beograd	(Lebanon)	546	40.82 million
Crayon d.o.o. Beograd	(Switzerland)	78	40.72 million
SAGA d.o.o. Beograd	(Austria)	190	40.49 million
NITES d.o.o. Beograd	(Czech Republic)	87	37.62 million
