= Economy of Belgrade =

Belgrade is the capital of Serbia.

Belgrade is located in the center of South East Europe, at the intersection of the strategic European transportation corridors Pan-European Corridor X and Pan-European Corridor VII, linking Western and Central Europe with the Middle East. It is lying at the confluence of the Sava and the Danube river.

As of 2022, the total nominal GDP of Belgrade stood at 26.2 billion USD, which equates to 15,533 euros per capita. In 2022, Belgrade comprised 40.0% of Serbia's total GDP.

== History ==
=== Growth of investments in Belgrade ===
The troubled political and economic transition during the 1990s left Belgrade, like the rest of the country, severely affected by an internationally imposed trade embargo. The hyperinflation of the Yugoslav dinar in Serbia and Montenegro, the highest inflation ever recorded in the world, decimated the city's economy In the competition for European cities and regions of the future in 2006 and 2007, organized by the Financial Times magazine, Belgrade was proclaimed "City of the Future in Southern Europe" on 16 March in Cannes.

The latest greenfield investments are also being increasingly realized in Zemun, the part of the city which will soon be on a par, according to investments, with New Belgrade, where the largest construction works have been carried out so far. The mayor expects foreign capital to start arriving faster in Belgrade and Serbia, which is also the precondition for the opening of new jobs and the start of new programs.

The competition for "Cities and Regions of the Future" is organized by the specialized edition of the Financial Times for foreign direct investments – FDI Magazine, and this prestigious annual award is presented for all the continents. The award also represents a recommendation of the world’s leading economic magazine for the locations where one should invest, since it is based on criteria such as economic potential, operating costs, human resources, transport, IT and telecommunication, as well as the quality of life for foreign investors.

== Overview ==
The following table gives a preview of total number of registered people employed in legal entities per their core activity (as of 2022):

Activity	Total
Agriculture, forestry and fishing	2,797
Mining and quarrying	8,889
Manufacturing	70,171
Electricity, gas, steam and air conditioning supply	8,748
Water supply; sewerage, waste management and remediation activities	9,281
Construction	46,893
Wholesale and retail trade, repair of motor vehicles and motorcycles	134,760
Transportation and storage	46,862
Accommodation and food services	32,383
Information and communication	61,696
Financial and insurance activities	22,655
Real estate activities	4,547
Professional, scientific and technical activities	66,877
Administrative and support service activities	77,171
Public administration and defense; compulsory social security	81,810
Education	47,124
Human health and social work activities	51,788
Arts, entertainment and recreation	17,003
Other service activities	16,862
Individual agricultural workers	2,025
Total	810,343

=== Business ===
In the recent years, investment climate in Belgrade and Serbia have been improved. The country is in the process of negotiating the accession to the European Union, and is the world’s leading reformer as stated by the World Bank. In addition, the pace of structural reforms is ahead of that in other transition countries according to the European Bank for Reconstruction and Development. Stocks are traded at the Belgrade Stock Exchange.

Most of notable Serbian companies are based in Belgrade, such as Air Serbia, AIK Banka, Belgrade Nikola Tesla Airport, Delhaize Serbia, Delta Holding, Dunav osiguranje, Elektromreža Srbije, Elektroprivreda Srbije, Energoprojekt holding, Frikom, Galenika, Generali Osiguranje, Hesteel Serbia, Imlek, MK Group, Nordeus, Pošta Srbije, Putevi Srbije, Serbia Broadband, Serbian Railways, Telekom Srbija, Telenor Srbija, Yugoimport SDPR, Štark and many others.

Also, Belgrade is a regional center for AXA, Carlsberg, CBRE Group, Delhaize Group, ComTrade Group, General Electric, Huawei, Japan Tobacco, Kraft Foods, Maquet, Motorola, MTV Adria, Mubadala, NCR Corporation, OMV, Procter & Gamble, Samsung, IKEA, Ericsson, Colliers International, CB Richard Ellis, SNC-Lavalin, Sinohydro Corporation, Société Générale, Unilever, Zepter International and many others.

=== Intellectual capital ===
As a leading educational center in Serbia comprising 62 university-level institutions, Belgrade boasts well educated, fast learning, multilingual and IT literate labor force. Over 8,000 students graduate from Belgrade University every year, with 1/3 of them adding to the traditionally strong engineer base. According to the Gallup International, the percentage of English speakers is the highest in Central and Eastern Europe, and an increasing number of western business schools open their affiliates in Belgrade.

== Sectors ==
=== Tourism and gastronomy ===
Since early 2000s, Belgrade has been gradually attracting foreign tourists with its vibrant cultural events and nightlife. Around 2000 restaurants, coffee shops, bars and nightlife venues are located in both downtown, uptown and suburban Belgrade. In addition, it has hosted many important sport competitions in the past, with multiple well-organized basketball and tennis courts.

=== Information Technology ===
With 6,924 companies in the IT sector (2013 data), Belgrade is one of the information technology centers in this part of Europe, with strong growth. Microsoft Development Center Serbia, located in Belgrade, was, at the time of its establishment, the fifth such center in the world. Many world IT companies choose Belgrade as regional or European center such as Asus, Intel, Dell, Huawei, NCR etc. What brought companies like Microsoft in the first place was a large pool of talented engineers and mathematicians in a lower wage country and these major investments had by 2018 generated over € Billion in exports. Nordeus, a local video game startup, is one of Europe's fastest growing gaming companies. In just five years of operation, Nordeus has grown to over 150 employees and €64 million of yearly sales. Another local startup, FishingBooker, was founded in 2013 and now employs over 80 people. Like Nordeus, FishingBooker is a bootstrapped startup. FishingBooker has been described as "the world’s largest online travel company that enables you to find and book fishing trips." In just the first quarter of 2016, more than US$65 million has been raised by Serbian startups including US$45 million for Seven Bridges (a Bioinformatics firm) and US$14 million for Vast (a data analysis firm). Also in 2016, a Belgrade-based website AskGamblers which is generating over €810,000 in revenue and €620,000 in profits was sold to Catena Media for €15 million, all 30 employees will continue to work as normal. The startup community is helped by a non profit organization called Startit which is an active community that acts as an incubator for new companies. Startit raised US$108,000 from its Kickstarter campaign in 2015, allowing it to expand its Belgrade center and build a second center in Inđija which was completed February 2016. Other exiting developments include an Agriculture Drone startup that uses drones for land surveying, TeleSkin an app which can identify and track skin cancer and there was another successful Kickstarter for Hexiwear a customizable smartwatch for developers. Progress in Serbian IT over the last six years has been tremendous with the fast growth only increasing as Serbia's many talented engineers, scientists and mathematicians break into this new industry where gross salaries average €2,000 per month (far more than the €600 national average).
