= Dragan Tomić =

Dragan Tomić may refer to:

- Dragan Tomić (Serbian politician, born 1935), acting President of Serbia in 1997
- Dragan Tomić (Serbian politician, born 1946), two-term mayor of Vranje
- Dragan Tomić (Serbian politician, born 1958), two-term parliamentarian
- Dragan Tomić (IT engineer), Serbian computer engineer
- Dragomir Dragan Tomić, Serbian entrepreneur and politician
