= Kopaonik Business Forum =

- Formation: 1994
- Founder: group of economists, members of Serbian Association of Economists
- Type: Business and economic forum
- Legal status: NGO
- Purpose: Annual reality check of Serbian and Western Balkans economic outlook
- Headquarters: Belgrade, Serbia
- Location: Kopaonik, Hotel Grand Convention Center
- Region served: Western Balkans
- Official language: English/Serbian
- President: Aleksandar Vlahović
- Website: Official website

The Kopaonik Business Forum (KBF; Serbian: Копаоник бизнис форум / Kopaonik biznis forum) is a Serbian and regional businesses conference held annually in March at the Kopaonik mountain resort in Serbia. It is organized by the Serbian Economists Association.

The conference gathers the Serbian corporate leaders, political leaders, economists, and journalists for four days to discuss the issues and development strategy of Serbia. It is often dubbed by media as the "Serbian Davos", relating to the World Economic Forum (WEF) meeting which is held annually in Davos, Switzerland.

== See also ==
- Economy of Serbia Savez ekonomista Srbije
