= Dejan Cvetković =

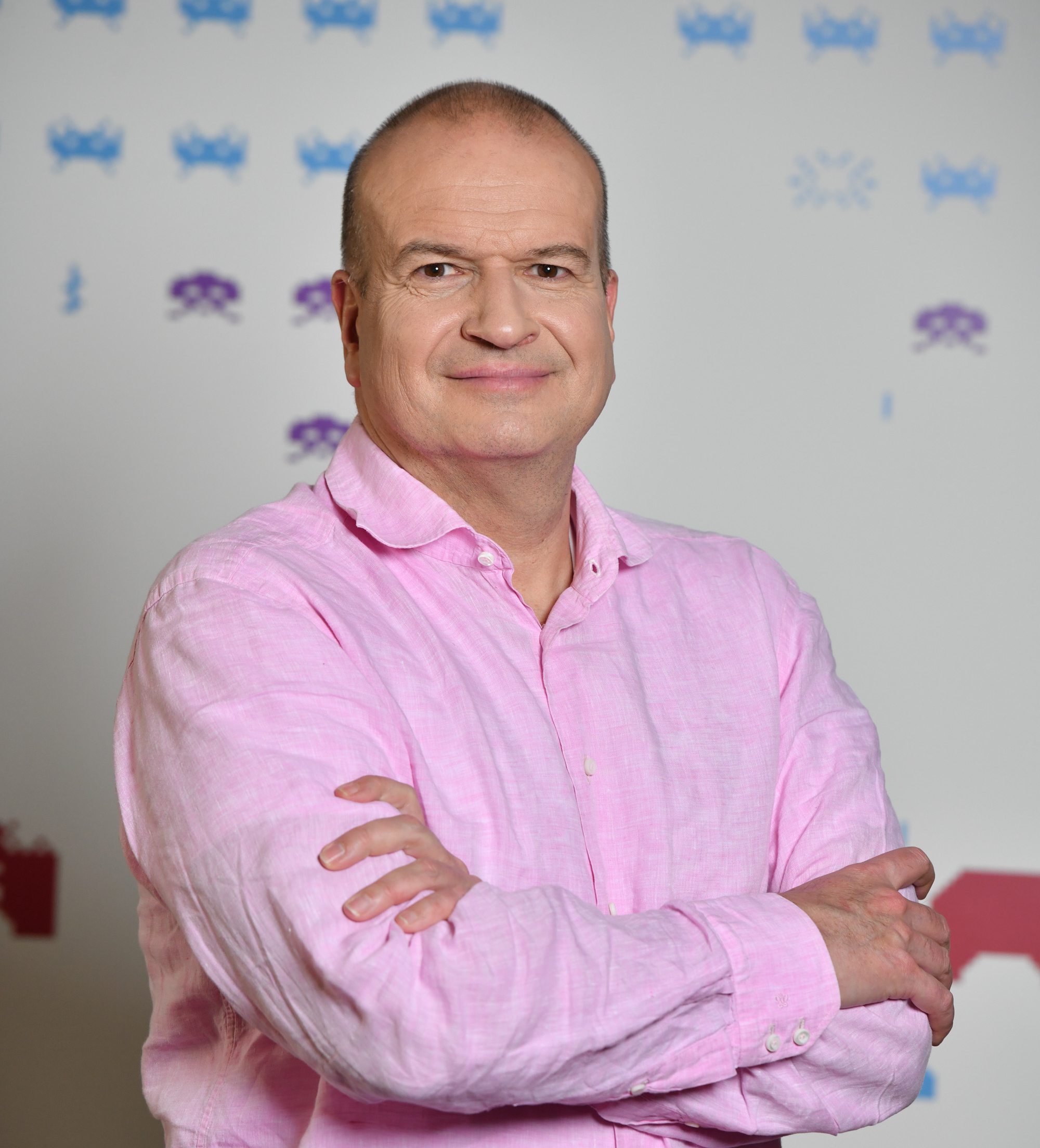
- Born: Belgrade, Serbia
- Education: University of Belgrade – Faculty of Electrical Engineering in Belgrade
- Occupation: electrical engineering

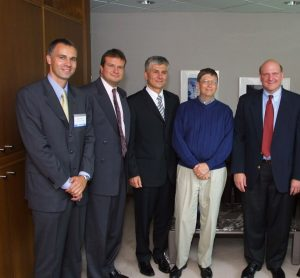

Dejan Cvetković (Serbian Cyrillic: Дејан Цветковић) has a bachelor's degree in electrical engineering. He is the first general director of Microsoft in Serbia and one of the founders of Microsoft Development Center Serbia (MDCS).

He graduated from The Faculty of Electrical Engineering at the University of Belgrade.

== Business career ==
He started his business career in 1991 as a software designer at Energodata company. Two years later, in 1993, he moved to Canada, where he got his immigrant visa and started working as a software engineer at Microsoft Corp. In the fall of 1995, he took the position of Microsoft consultant focused on banking solutions for HSBC bank, and four years later, he became the sales manager for the public sector for Western Canada.

In May 2003, Dejan returned to Serbia and became the general director of Microsoft Serbia, establishing two Microsoft subsidiaries – one in Serbia and one in Montenegro. In September 2005, he was one of the founders of Microsoft Development Center in Serbia, one of four centers of that kind worldwide, outside of the US. In September 2008, he became the managing partner for the whole CEE – Central and Eastern Europe.

Finally, in July 2009, Dejan took over the role of director for the public sector for the CEE region. In 2010, Dejan received Microsoft Platinum Award from the company. In 2016, he became Digital Transformation Chief Technology Officer. Two years later, he returned to the sales arena and became Global Technical Sales Lead, in charge of the management and development of the technical sales.

In 2020, he went to join the MDCS, which he had established 15 years earlier, and became Chief technology officer – CTO. He held this position until 2023.

Dejan Cvetković was one of the organizers of the first Microsoft conference in this region. He says today that Synergy accomplished its original goals, which is visible in the outstanding growth of the IT sector in Serbia.

== Highlights ==
Dejan was one of the initiators and mediators in communicating and organizing the signing of the first contract between Microsoft corporation and the Federal Republic of Yugoslavia, i.e. Bill Gates and Zoran Đinđić.

Dejan Cvetković is the younger brother of Svetozar Cvetković, a famous actor and a film producer. As he says himself, it was a trick of fate that he didn't go to study arts at Faculty of Drama arts (Camera department). However, the knowledge acquired at the Belgrade Mathematical Gymnasium steered him to enroll the Faculty of Engineering.

== See more ==
- Microsoft Development Center Serbia
