= EMS (pharmaceuticals) =

Brazilian pharmaceutical company

EMS S.A.
- Type: Private
- Industry: Pharmaceuticals
- Founded: 1950
- Headquarters: Hortolândia, Brazil
- Key people: Waldir Eschberger, (CEO)
- Products: Drugs and generic drug
- Revenue: ▲US$ 1.3 billion (2016)
- Number of employees: 4,500
- Subsidiaries: Galenika a.d. Brace Pharma
- Website: www.ems.com.br

EMS is the biggest domestic pharmaceutical company in Brazil. Founded in the mid-1950s, the company has six industrial plants based in São Bernardo do Campo, Hortolândia and Jaguariúna, in the state of São Paulo, Manaus, Brasília and Belgrade in Serbia.

EMS operates through five divisions:

- EMS Similars - markets similares; a class of pharmaceuticals peculiar to the Brazilian market. Not generics but not original brands either;
- EMS Generics - markets generics;
- EMS Sigma Pharma - markets branded medicines;
- EMS Hospital - markets drugs to hospitals;
- EMS Consumer - markets OTC drugs.

Today the company has a presence in over 30 countries through joint-ventures and strategic partnerships with other pharmaceutical companies.

EMS's Brazilian main competitors are Hypera Pharma, Eurofarma, Aché and Cristália.
