= Serbia and the World Bank =

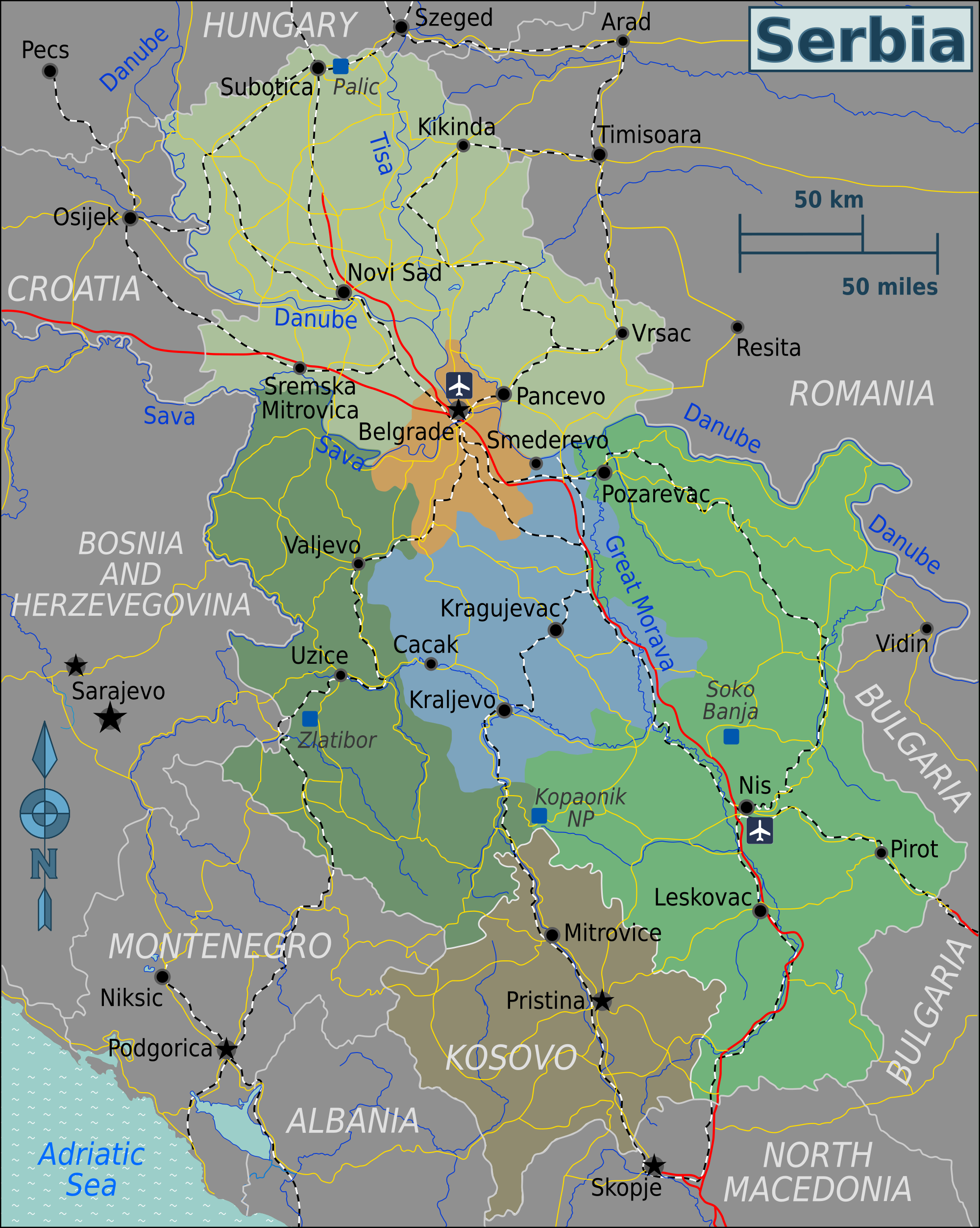
Serbia Regions map

The World Bank Group is a family of five international organizations that have provided leveraged loans and monetary assistance to the Southeastern European country of Serbia with aim to contribute country's goal of integration into the European Union through the establishment of inclusive and competitive economy.

== History ==
Following its founding in 1944, the World Bank funded numerous essential projects in Serbia, from the Belgrade-Bar railway in 1964. ( $658 million equivalent), to the Ibar-Lepenac hydro system in 1986 and Kolubara A thermal power plant in 1991.

The period under international economic sanctions (1992-1995), civil war, infrastructure-damaging NATO airstrikes in 1999 resulted in record-breaking hyperinflation and fall of Serbian economy below the levels of 1990.

After the expulsion of Federal Yugoslav President MILOSEVIC in September 2000, the Democratic Opposition of Serbia (DOS) coalition government executed stabilization measurements and initiated market reform program. Serbia rejoined the World Bank and renewed its membership in the International Monetary Fund in the December of 2000.

Between the years 2001 and 2008, the World Bank provided funds for 32 projects in Serbia with the combined cost of over $1 billion aimed to improve Serbia’s banking, education, energy, public finance, and social sectors. The WBG contributed to the privatization of several state and socially-owned companies, assisted in the modernization of frontier passages, reformation of the judiciary system, road reconstruction, addressed improvement environment, health, and employment services.

The current Serbia's World Bank Portfolio includes 13 projects in the areas of transport, real estate management/business environment, competitiveness and jobs, health, flood recovery and flood protection, disaster risk management, financial sector reform, public sector modernization (including the digitalization of selected public services and the modernization of tax administration), and early childhood education.

== Projects ==
=== Corridor X Highway ===
The Corridor X (Highlighted in red)

With a total cost of $448 million, the Corridor X is the largest World bank project in Serbia, which commitment to the project is $60 million, while the rest is provided by IBRD. The purpose of the Corridor X Highway Project is to enhance the capability of traffic transit, increase safety on each part of three sections of corridor X. The highway lies between Nis and Dimitrovgrad and Leskovac (Grabovnica) and Donji Neradovac. Corridor X includes both railroad and motor highway. It is a portion of the Pan-European network to expedite the connectivity with other parts of Serbia and other European countries. It is vital for Serbia’s competitiveness and allows conjunction with the center of Europe, Greece, and Asia.

By the year 2020, the railway part of the corridor will allow trains to travel with a speed of 120–200 km/h. With the total length of 803 kilometers, Corridor X is the least line from Central Europe to Greece, Turkey, and the Middle East.

=== Education Improvement Project ===
With the total cost of US$12.17 million, the purpose of the Republic of Serbia Education Improvement Project is to assist the Serbian government in implementing practical education amelioration.

The four segments of the project include:

- improvement grants to 650 basic and 50 general secondary schools.
- establishment of a contemporary internationally acknowledged system for assessment and examinations
- develop effective management and allocation of financial resources
- promote decentralization of education

As a part of the project, 1684 primary and secondary schools in Serbia was trained in developing school plans. The participation of local communities helped to distinguish problems and ways to address them. A conducted study showed that 80% of the participants were satisfied with the opportunity to undergo the training. As a result, the Serbian government implemented a law to make it imperative for all schools to prepare school development plans.
