= NALED Serbia =

Serbian economic corporation

NALED Serbia, or National Alliance for Local Economic Development is the largest private-public business association in Serbia, with more than 280 member companies, local governments, and non-government organisations, whose goal is to create better conditions of living and doing business in Serbia.

Since it was founded in 2006, NALED has become one of the leading authorities in the field of monitoring the regulatory activity and measuring the public administration performance. In cooperation with the state institutions and with the support of international organizations, NALED has realized more than 40 projects for economic development: Business Friendly Certification, Regulatory Index of Serbia (RIS), Grey Book, campaign Ask WHEN, By-Law Barometer, Calculator of local business expenses and many others. NALED key partners involve the Delegation of the European Union to Serbia, Open Society Foundations, GIZ and USAID. NALED's mission is to improve the business environment in Serbia through institutional reforms with active participation and cooperation of businesses, local governments and the citizens. NALED's main goals are the following: - Improving the regulatory framework for doing business - Municipal capacity building for economic development - Promotion of dialogue between private and public sector
