= Serbia and the International Monetary Fund =

Serbia has been a member of the International Monetary Fund (IMF) since December 14, 2022 with a quota of Special Drawing Rights (SDR) 654.8 million ($615.21 million) and 8,000 votes (0.16% of the total vote share). Serbia is currently represented on the Executive Board by Piotr Trabinski in a constituency with Azerbaijan, Kazakhstan, the Kyrgyz Republic, Poland, Serbia, Switzerland, Tajikistan, Turkmenistan, and Uzbekistan that holds 2.88% of the total vote share.

== IMF Programs in Serbia ==
=== Background ===
The Federal Republic of Yugoslavia (FRY) faced sanctions from the United Nations, the European Union, and the United States during the Bosnian War and the Kosovo War. The UN Security Council passed over 100 resolutions against the FRY and Serbians from 1992–1995 including a ban on international trade, scientific and technical cooperation, sports and cultural exchanges, air travel, shipments, and travel of government officials. The United States seized all FRY-owned assets and maintained an "outer wall" of sanctions after the war, which prevented the FRY's membership in international organizations including the IMF. During the Kosovo War, sanctions expanded to include bans on oil exports to the FRY and the freezing of government assets in the EU. The sanctions reduced the country's GDP to $6.88 billion (40% of pre-war output) in 2000 while two-thirds of the population live in poverty (under $60 of income per month). Economic pressures sparked hyperinflation of the Yugoslav dinar, reaching a peak of 313 million percent in January 1994. Sanctions were broadly lifted after the removal from power of Slobodan Milošević, and normal diplomatic relations were restored. The FRY achieved impressive growth and commitment to structural reforms in the 2000s, but faced renewed economic difficulty after the 2008 financial crisis.

=== Membership ===
Amid the breakup of the Socialist Federal Republic of Yugoslavia (SFRY) into constituencies, Serbia and Montenegro formed the Federal Republic of Yugoslavia (FRY). On December 14, 1992, the IMF recognized the FRY’s claim to succeed the membership of the SFRY and assume 36.52% responsibility for its assets and liabilities. The IMF imposed four conditions for approval of the FRY’s membership, stating the authorities must agree to assume responsibility over its allocated share of the SFRY’s assets and liabilities, notify the Fund of its agreement to the terms and conditions, settle any of the SFRY’s outstanding arrears with the Fund, and be found to be capable of fulfilling the terms of the Articles of Agreement. The FRY was not found to meet these conditions until December 20, 2000, when the Democratic Opposition of Serbia (DOS) assumed power after the ousting of President Slobodan Milošević. The IMF approved the country for membership with a quota of SDR 467.70 million that grew to SDR 654.8 million ($615.21) after the 2016 Board Reforms.

=== 2000-2006 ===
In June 2001, the FRY requested Post-crisis Emergency Assistance from the IMF of SDR 116.9 million ($151 million) or 25% of their quota. The loan provided bridge loans so the FRY could clear the SFRY’s existing arrears and liabilities, finance their quota, and support a short-term program to stabilize their devastated economy. The program was intended to bring inflation under control and begin the improvement of institutional capacity by establishing a ceiling on bank financing in the budget and credit expansion for the National Bank of Yugoslavia, introducing a managed floating exchange rate, and improving fiscal policy through prioritization of expenditures, improving tax administration, and widening the tax base.

Upon the expiration of the Post-crisis Emergency Assistance program, the FRY requested a Stand-by Arrangement (SBA): an IMF program with policy conditions that includes financial assistance for a member state that needs support resulting from a financial crisis. The SBA sought to build upon the initial progress made by the previous program to encourage the FRY’s macroeconomic and financial stabilization. In June 2001, the IMF approved a SDR 200 million ($263.08 million) that imposed strict limits on credit expansion to reduce inflation, streamlined the complex tax system, bring military spending under civilian control, and create a framework for privatization of state-owned enterprises. After successfully meeting targets in semi-annual reviews, the FRY requested an Extended Arrangement in May 2002 for SDR 650 million ($829 million) that expired in May 2005 and was extended until completion in February 2006.

=== 2009-2018 ===
In 2006, Montenegro and Serbia separated to become independent sovereign states. requested a new SBA as the effects of the 2008 financial crisis expanded in January 2009. The 15-month program was intended to be precautionary with funds only drawn if it became necessary. At SDR 350.8 million ($558.7 million), it became Serbia’s largest SBA and its first since its independence after the breakup of the FRY. The IMF believed Serbia’s strong growth, moderate inflation, and strong banking system could serve as an adequate buffer to the spillovers of the financial turmoil. However, as the crisis deepened, Serbia’s GDP continued to contract, inflation rose, and the IMF viewed their growth model as unsustainable. The SBA was extended in May 2009 to April 2011 and augmented to SDR 2.6 billion ($4.02 billion). Upon completion of the program, Serbia had withdrawn disbursements of SDR 1.368 billion ($2.2 billion).

Following a lackluster recovery, Serbia began a new 36-month, SDR 935.4 million ($1.23 billion) SBA in February 2015. The country faced the second-largest deficit in Europe, declining revenues in spite of recent tax hikes, increases in spending on public wages, pension bills, and ailing state-owned enterprises and public banks. The program’s goals included macroeconomic rebalancing, restoration of confidence and fiscal sustainability, and structural and institutional reform by curbing mandatory spending, reducing state transfers to state-owned enterprises, and improving tax collection efficiency. The program was implemented successfully with a budget surplus in 2017 and a fiscal adjustment of 6% GDP that exceeded expectations.

=== 2018-Present ===
The success of the 2015 SBA allowed Serbia to shift from the IMF’s financial assistance SBA program to a non-financing tool, the Policy Coordination Instrument (PCI). The purpose of a PCI is to signal commitment to a reform agenda to official creditors and private investors. The 30-month program approved in 2018 committed to increasing public investment, improving the business climate, reducing informality, decreasing public debt, and strengthening market development. In 2020, the priorities shifted to mitigating the financial spillover effects of the COVID-19 pandemic.

The IMF approved another 30-month PCI in June 2021 amid the uncertainty of the pandemic. The PCI sought to accelerate structural and institutional reforms, sustain growth over the medium-term, and ensure inclusivity in the economic recovery.
