= Taxation in Serbia =

Taxation in Serbia consists of the following; the standard corporate tax rate in Serbia is 15%, although some deductions might apply. The standard VAT rate is 20% and the lower rate is 10%. Income from dividends is a subject to a 15% tax. Serbia has tax treaties with most countries in, but few outside, Europe.

The standard monthly payroll tax rate is 10%. However, if a physical person earns more than 3 times of an average salary, they are also liable for an additional annual income tax, which has two "brackets". The first "bracket" of the annual income tax encompasses salaries and certain other (but not all) incomes that are 3 times average salary, with an additional tax rate of 10% being applied. As the second "bracket", if a person earning six times the average salary, an additional 15% is applied on top of the previously described taxes. It must be clear that all the tax rates described are cumulatively applied, one on top of the other.

Obligatory contributions for state funds by an employee (up to a certain amount) include:

- 14% state pension fund
- 5.15% state health fund
- 0.75% unemployment insurance

Obligatory contributions for state funds by an employer (also capped) include:

- 12% state pension fund
- 5.15% state health fund
- 0.00% unemployment insurance

The effective personal income tax rate is therefore somewhere in the range 20–41%.

Capital gains, including dividends and interest are not subject to personal income tax, since all three regimes of income tax (monthly payroll tax, annual 10% tax, annual 15% tax) are in essence schedular. However, it has been noted that Serbian government and government-controlled media have frequently falsely claimed that the annual income tax is a synthetic tax that encompasses all possible types of incomes, even going so far as to baselessly proclaim that the person paying the most annual income tax in a year is "the richest man in Serbia", thus hiding the underdevelopment and uncertainty of the tax law in Serbia and the growing income disparity. In reality, virtually none of the controversial oligarch-like financiers in Serbia (such as Milan Radoičić and Miroslav Mišković) living in obvious wealth pay the annual income tax, because their wealth is derived from capital and not encompassed by either the payroll or income taxes.
