= Top Eleven Football Manager =

Top Eleven
- Developer: Nordeus
- Publisher: Nordeus
- Platforms: iOS, Android, WebGL
- Release: Facebook (9 May 2010); Android (20 October 2011) iOS (23 November 2011); Odnoklassniki (8 May 2012)
- Genres: Simulation, RPG
- Mode: Single-player with multiplayer interaction

Top Eleven is a football manager simulation developed and published by Nordeus in May 2010, and is available on both Google Play Store and the App Store.

== Overview ==
The game can also be played on Facebook and it allows players to play against their friends and others online. The game was conceived in order to address a lack of football management games in the social media environment. The game builds on the concepts and gameplay found in games like Sports Interactive's Football Manager and Electronic Arts' Premier Manager that have managed to engage millions of football fans, and giving them access to social features. Top Eleven Football Manager has managed to transfer the look and feel of desktop applications to Facebook.

Since November 2011, Top Eleven is available for mobile devices, Android and iOS. Two years after being launched on Facebook, Top Eleven was launched on one of the biggest Russian social networks, Odnoklassniki. According to the statistics from Facebook, there were more than 15 million monthly users in 2014.

In 2013, Nordeus introduced José Mourinho as the official "face of the game". Since then players can challenge Mourinho in game and get some tips from him. On 16 May, 2017, Stoke City announced that Top Eleven would become the club's sleeve sponsor beginning from the 2017–18 Premier League season. It was also the shirt sponsor of Hashtag United from 2017 to 2018.

Since it is a mobile game which people can download and play for free, Nordeus took advantage of advertisements. Users have a choice whether or not to watch them, for which they are rewarded for watching.
