= ComTrade Group =

Software companies of Serbia

Comtrade Group
- Native name: Комтрејд Група
- Company type: Private
- Industry: IT
- Founded: 1996; 30 years ago
- Founder: Veselin Jevrosimović
- Headquarters: Belgrade, Serbia
- Area served: Worldwide
- Key people: Veselin Jevrosimović (chairman and owner); Alexis Lope-Bello (CEO); Terry T. Curtis (CFO)
- Services: IT solutions, system integration, software engineering, IT distribution
- Revenue: ▲US$500 million (2022)
- Number of employees: 3,000
- Website: comtrade.com

Comtrade Group is a software & IT hardware company based in Belgrade, Serbia with divisional head offices in Boston, Dublin, Amsterdam and Ljubljana. Founded in 1991, its business focuses to developing hardware and large software storage systems for institutions and corporations, as well as core software for online & land-based casinos.

== History ==
Comtrade Group was founded in 1991 by Serbian businessman Veselin Jevrosimović. It designed the first Serbian desktop and notebook in 2006.

In 2015, the company joined CERN openlab as an associate member. In 2016, the firm partnered with Citrix to develop management packs for their platforms. Additionally, ComTrade has the largest artificial intelligence division in South Eastern Europe for now.

Comtrade wrote the code for the warehouse robots used at Amazon.com. It also developed the software infrastructure at Ryanair and various luggage transport systems.

The company has offices in Belgrade, Sarajevo, Ljubljana, Sunnyvale, Boston, Dublin, Budapest, Ireland and the Philippines. In 2008, it acquired the Slovenian software firm Hermes Softlab. In 2014, ComTrade Group launched the Tesla brand of tablets, smartphones, monitors and TVs. In 2016, ComTrade Software, a subsidiary of ComTrade Group, launched its US headquarters in Boston. In 2017, Jevrosimović opened the parent company's 18th office in the city of Dubai, as well as a technology center in Čačak. Comtrade employs 1,200 software engineers and has been a member of the World Economic Forum since 2009.
