= List of Serbs by net worth =

This is a list of wealthy Serbs.

== List ==
Name	Citizenship	Net worth	Source of wealth
Philip Zepter (Milan Janković)	Serbia	$2.6 billion (2008)	multiple sources
Dragan Šolak	Serbia	$1.9 billion (2022)	media, football
Predrag Ranković	Serbia	$750 million (2008)	
Stanko Subotić	Serbia	$600 million (2007)	
