= Schneider Electric DMS =

Serbian company

Schneider Electric
- Official logo
- Native name: Шнaјдер Електрик
- Company type: d.o.o.
- Industry: Electrical equipment
- Founded: 20 May 2008; 18 years ago (Current form); 2002; 24 years ago (Founded)
- Headquarters: Industrijska 3g, Novi Sad, Serbia
- Area served: Worldwide
- Key people: Dragoljub Damljanović (Director)
- Products: Programmable logic controllers, sensors, variable-frequency drives, uninterruptible power supplies, circuit breakers, switchgear, switchboards, motor controllers
- Revenue: ▼€27.96 million (2018)
- Net income: ▲ (€9.26 million) (2018)
- Total assets: ▲€73.45 million (2018)
- Total equity: ▲€59.70 million (2018)
- Owner: Schneider Electric España (100%)
- Number of employees: 900 (2018)
- Parent: Schneider Electric
- Website: www.se.com/rs/hub

Schneider Electric (full legal name: Schneider Electric doo Novi Sad d.o.o) is a Serbian company that specializes in electricity distribution, automation management and produces installation components for energy management. It is headquartered in Novi Sad, Serbia.

== History ==
The company was founded in 2002 and operated as part of French international company Schneider Electric. According to 2016 media reports, Schneider Electric DMS has close ties with professors at the Faculty of Technical Sciences, and thus has privileged position in graduates recruitment.

In November 2017, it celebrated its 15-year anniversary. In 2019, Schneider Electric acquired the remaining 43% of shares from the minority shareholder "DMS" for an undisclosed sum.

Since 22 May 2012, Schneider Electric founded the Center for Young Talents foundation (Serbian: Фондација "Центар за младе таленте", Fondacija "Centar za mlade talente"), a non-profit non-governmental organization based in Novi Sad whose goals are to contribute to the development of theoretical and practical knowledge in informatics, mathematics and other fields, to contribute to the improvement and practical implementation of the education system in the aforementioned fields, as well as to contribute to the permanent education and training of existing personnel. Originally the programming and math courses were classroom-only, until the 2016/17 school year when the first online classes for mathematics were held (PMUFO). Since 2019/20 school year, over 3,000 classes were held and had 2,881 registered participants on its educational portal.

In July 2021, plans for the new IT building in Novi Sad were revealed. Designed by Zabriskie studio from Belgrade in collaboration with the Novaston Project Management company, the engineering was done by Axisa from Novi Sad.

In June 2023, with the presence of high-ranking officials, the company Schneider Electric opened its new IT center in Novi Sad, called InGrid. This modern office space with an open form, with lots of light and greenery, is interesting because it is located in the reconstructed Užara hall of Novkabel, a former industrial giant under whose auspices the first personal computers were made in the late 1970s and early 1980s in the former Yugoslavia. The 14,500 square meter building is characterized by a carbon-neutral footprint, as well as unique solutions from the Schneider Electric company that provide both power from renewable sources, as well as complete comfort and functionality for work. The building is covered by 1,500 square meters of solar panels that sustain half of the building's annual electrical usage. InGrid was awarded the Platinum LEED certificate for its high ecological sustainability.
