= Microsoft Development Center Serbia =

Coordinates: 44.8159°N 20.4383°E

Microsoft Development Center Serbia (MDCS) is Microsoft's first greenfield investment in this part of the world, with its headquarters in Belgrade. It was established in 2005.

MDCS is an engineering campus in Europe for Microsoft, which designs software services and products through multidisciplinary technical teams.

== Development Center teams ==
Microsoft Development Center Serbia comprises the following teams:

Azure Data team produces data processing development in Microsoft Cloud. The Azure Data team in Belgrade owns and develops the product called Managed Instance. The team develops end-to-end management for Service Fabric that is capable of orchestrating millions of containers on thousands of virtual machines.

The office team in Serbia is focused on reviewing and empowering Microsoft Office productivity through user experience and services based on artificial intelligence developed within Office M365 ecosystem. The products such as Microsoft Editor, Similarity Checker, and Word Designer have been developed in Serbia.

Office Media Groups vision is to empower all Microsoft 365 clients to achieve more with the Office options. OMG team aims to provide all the possibilities for each Microsoft client with tools and experience created to meet their needs as best they can.

Maps team in Belgrade has the most prominent role in Microsoft's intention to bring closer Open maps to the growing community, using artificial intelligence for sorting specific map characteristics from satellite footage, such as cars, roads, and buildings.

Math team helps students to develop their mathematical skills using the digital mathematical tool via the Microsoft Education portfolio. This work contributes to the more extensive efforts to build an inclusive digital classroom that satisfies all students' needs and helps them develop basic skills, such as reading, writing, mathematics, and communication.

Mixed Reality Serbia is the team looking into the future in which reality has been augmented, so not only physical space is visible, but also digital content/holograms interacting with it. MR aims to enable presence and mutual experience regardless of the physical distance of the people. This future is powered by Microsoft Mesh, and the Belgrade Team contributes to the development of devices, software, and artificial intelligence.

Havok team creates software used by top game development studios worldwide and makes the best-selling games every year.

== Community initiatives ==
Microsoft Development Center Serbia organizes projects thus contributing to the Serbian society and the community where it operates, in cooperation with organizations such as "Digital Serbia", "Loop", numerous faculties, simultaneously empowering technological ecosystem in Serbia through competitions such as "Bubble cup" and initiatives such as "Girls in ICT" which has grown into "Women know IT" where girls and women are empowered to pursue or continue their careers in IT industry. Those initiatives were led by several notable people like Dragan Tomic, Dejan Cvetkovic and Tanja Tatomirovic.
