= Dragan Tomić (IT engineer) =

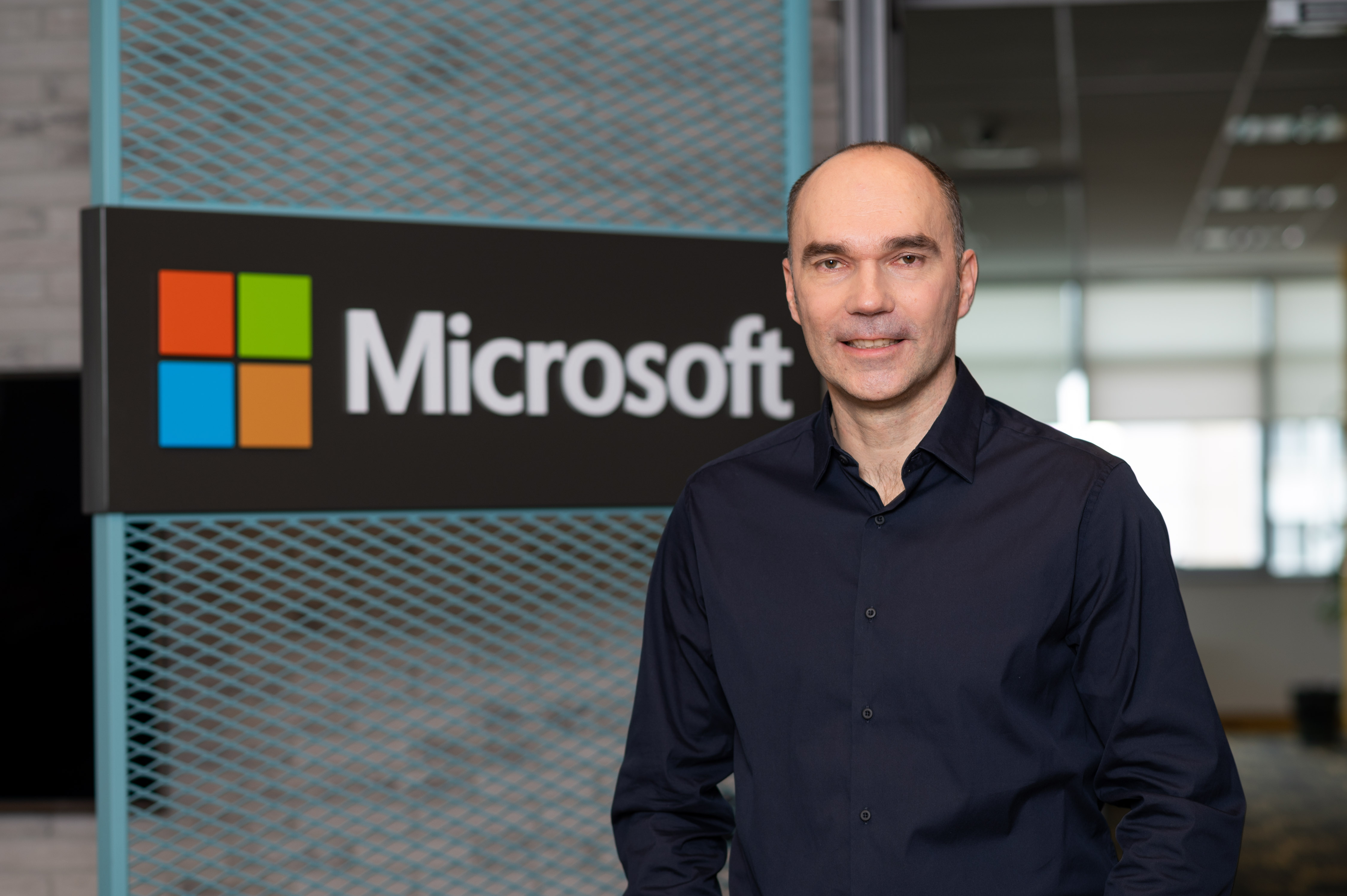
- Born: Belgrade, Serbia
- Education: Texas Tech University, University of Washington
- Occupation: electrical engineering

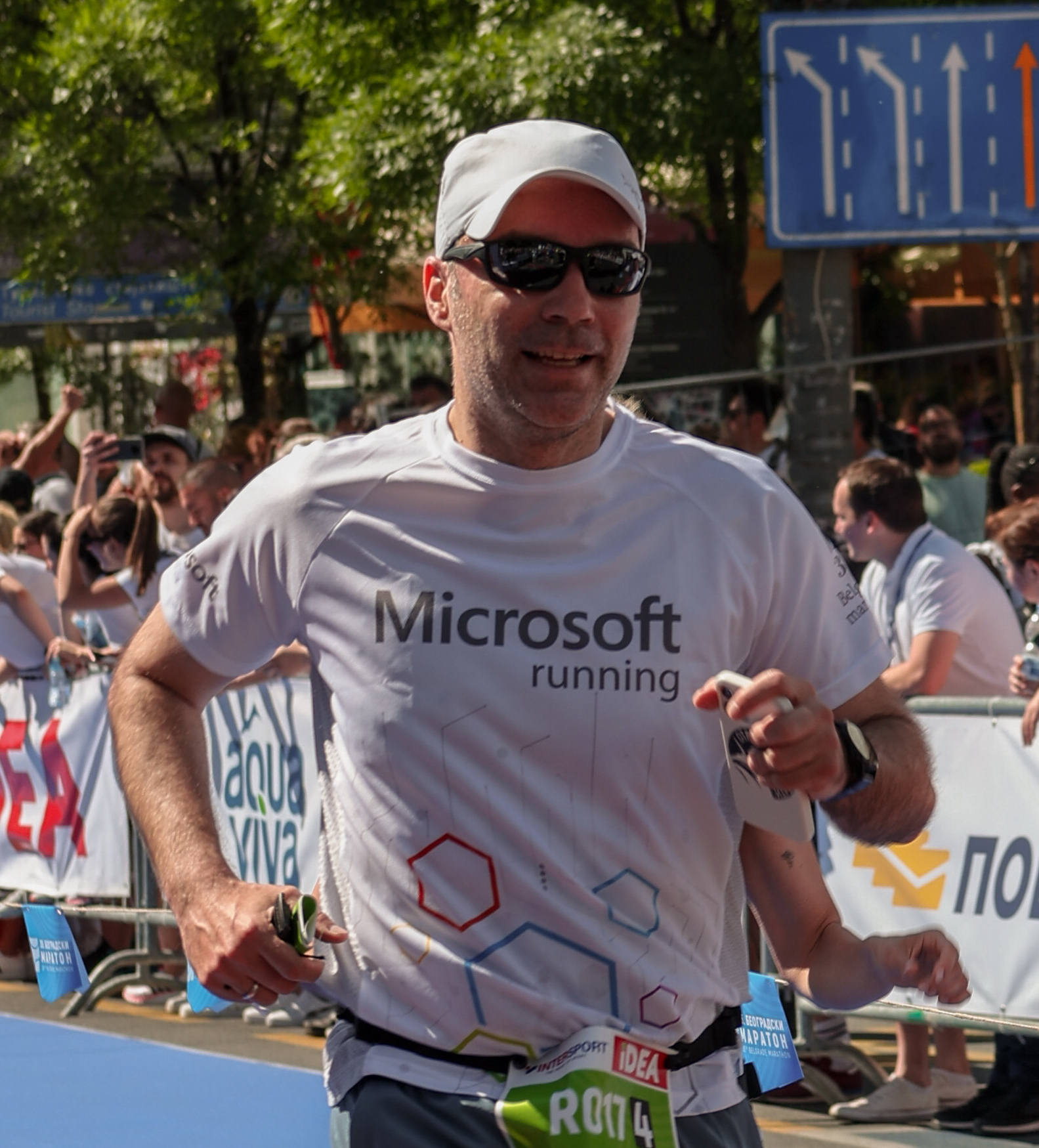

Dragan Tomić (Serbian Cyrillic: Драган Томић) was the director of the Microsoft Development Center Serbia – MDCS, vice president of engineering at Microsoft Corporation, and he is one of the founders of the Belgrade Technology Institute.

After several successful decades at Microsoft, Dragan Tomic is leaving the company in May 2023 to focus on a career change.

== Education and school competitions ==
Dragan has a bachelor's degree in electrical engineering. He started school in Belgrade. In 1992, having finished his third grade of secondary school, he continued his studies in the US as a part of the student exchange program. He graduated in computer science and electrical engineering from Texas Tech University in 1998. He also studied at the University of Washington from 2002 to 2005, obtaining his MBA degree in entrepreneurship and finance. During his studies, he participated in many competitions when he was in secondary school, but especially during his university days. He was a multiple finalist in ACM, a type of world championship in programming. At the University International League (UIL), he won the programming competition for all secondary schools in Texas in 1993. At the regional ACM competitions in 1993–1995, he held 4th to 2nd place. In 1995 and 1996, he was a finalist in the ACM international programming competition. As the coach for the Texas Tech University programming team, he won the first place in the region and was ranked among the first 15 in the finale of the international ACM competition.

== Professional career ==
His professional career started in 1998, after two years of internship at Microsoft Redmond. After 2006, when he got acquainted with the work of the Microsoft Development Center in Serbia, he joined the team in 2007. At that time, an SQL team was established with only several people, which later became the Azure team. Now, this is the largest team in MDCS and the most important Azure Data team in Europe within the company.

== Highlights ==
Dragan is passionate about sports and nurtures sportsmanship. He enjoys running, spending time in nature camping, and he spends his winters skiing.

== See more ==
- Microsoft Development Center Serbia
