= Microsoft Editor =

Writing assistant software

Microsoft Editor: Spelling & Grammar Checker
- Developer: Microsoft
- Release: July 2016
- Written in: JavaScript, C#
- Included with: Microsoft 365, Microsoft Edge
- Size: 1.92MiB Chrome Web Store
- Available in: 100+ languages including Arabic - Czech - Danish - Dutch - English - Finnish - French - German - Hebrew (not yet available in the desktop Word app) - Hungarian - Italian - Japanese - Korean - Norwegian (Bokmål) - Polish - Portuguese (Brazil) - Portuguese (Portugal) - Russian - Spanish - Swedish - Turkish
- Website: https://www.microsoft.com/en-us/microsoft-365/microsoft-editor

Microsoft Editor is a closed source AI-powered writing assistant available for Word, Outlook, and as a Chromium browser extension part of Microsoft 365. It includes the essentials in a writing assistant, such as a grammar and spell checker. Microsoft provides a basic version of Editor for free but users wanting more features will need to have a paid Microsoft account.

| Version | Price |
|---|---|
| Microsoft 365 Personal | $9.99 monthly |
| Microsoft 365 Family | $12.99 monthly |

As of October 2024, Microsoft Editor whilst being a Microsoft product, is not available in all of Microsoft tools (even popular business applications such as their messaging client, Microsoft Teams).

== Tools and features ==
Editor score using :

- Corrections:
  - Spelling
  - Basic Grammar: Flags capitalization, subject verb agreement, hyphen use, and other basic grammar errors
  - Advanced Grammar (paid version) Flag indirect questions, misheard phrases, commonly confused phrases, and other more complex grammar issues
- Refinements (paid version):
  - Clarity: Flags incorrect use of words, uncommon jargon, abstract words, passive voice, and double negatives.
  - Conciseness: Flags wordiness, conjunction overuse
  - Formality: Flags slang, informal phrases, colloquialisms, contractions, and other markers of casual, more conversational language.
  - Inclusiveness: Flags slurs and deprecated descriptors of people
  - Perspectives
  - Punctuation conventions: Flags unnecessary commas, punctuation with quotes, sentence spacing, and other issues related to punctuation.
  - Sensitive geopolitical references: promotes using official or neutral names and phrases, and tries to help when names of places have changed over time.
  - Vocabulary: Flags vague adjectives, weak verbs, clichés, and other issues related to word choice. Recommends idiomatic collective nouns, such as beds of oysters over collections of oysters. Recommends using terms specific to the reader's country or region, such as parkade over parking garage for Canadian readers. Editor recommends avoiding words that are specific to a US region; for example, it will suggest replacing bubbler with water fountain.

=== Geopolitical references ===
As described by Microsoft's Detailed descriptions of grammar and refinement guidance of June 2020, the guidance on sensitive geopolitical references promotes

- using official place names, such as Canada over Republic of Canada,
- using the most politically neutral place name, such as Sea of Japan (East Sea) over East Sea,
- avoiding geopolitical terms that may imply bias, so it suggests using East Asia instead of Orient,
- avoiding the word 'dialect' for some languages,
- using current geopolitical terms such as Czech instead of Czechoslovak,
- using current place names, such as St. Petersburg over Leningrad,
- avoiding technological terms that evoke geopolitical or humanitarian issues, so it suggests using secondary database over slave database,
- using modern transliterations, such as Chongqing over Chungking,
- double-checking names of defunct geopolitical entities in modern contexts, such as asking if Eastern Germany is beautiful in summer might be more appropriate than The GDR is beautiful in summer,
- using official names of languages, such as Persian over Farsi, or European Spanish or Spanish over standard Spanish,
- and double-checking place names whose meaning has changed over time, such as Astana versus Tselinograd.

== Platform support ==
- Windows supported / Linux unsupported
- Microsoft Edge
- Google Chrome
- Brave

== See also ==
- LanguageTool
- Microsoft Graph
- Grammarly
