= Veselin Jevrosimović =

Veselin Jevrosimovic
- Born: Belgrade, Serbia
- Occupation(s): Owner and chairman of Comtrade Group
- Children: 2

Veselin Jevrosimovic (Serbian Cyrillic: Веселин Јевросимовић; ) is the owner and chairman of IT company Comtrade, headquartered in Belgrade. He is also the president of the Athletics Association of Serbia

== Background ==
Veselin Jevrosimović was born in Belgrade, Serbia, in 1965, he grew up in a middle-class family, in the Belgrade municipality and neighbourhood of Voždovac. He has an older brother Veljko. He earned a place in the national athletics team and later became the national University league pole vault champion. As part of the Düsseldorf Athletics Club he spent time in Germany, later in the United States. Jevrosimović would later advance his education with an IT engineering degree from the Information Technology School in Belgrade.

== Career ==
In 1986 Jevrosimovic became the co-owner of an IT equipment distribution company in Germany. Keeping his connections in the U.S., he started a computer distribution business there, which led to him becoming a partner in CHS Electronics later in the 90s. Parallel to businesses in Germany and the U.S. he founded Comtrade Group in Serbia in 1991, a company that would become one of the largest IT organizations in Southeast Europe. In 1996, CHS Electronics, at which Mr. Jevrosimović was a partner, had become the no.2 computer equipment distribution company in the world, with a turnover of 12.5 billion dollars. Later that year Veselin sold his shares in the company and returned to Serbia to focus on the development of Comtrade's business.

Favouring a regional expansion strategy, Mr. Jevrosimović opened a company in Bosnia and Herzegovina in 1997, and proceeded to expand the network into Montenegro, Macedonia, Croatia and Albania. In 2008 he led the acquisition of the largest Slovenian software company, Hermes Softlab. This purchase was a confirmation of Comtrade's evolution to software engineering and development, which began in 2000, when Jevrosimović founded Spinnaker, a system integration company that later changed its name to Comtrade System Integration. The software segment is now the largest within the Comtrade Group and contributes to over 80% of its annual income. In 2004 he bought property in New Belgrade, that he developed into the Comtrade Technology Center (2006) - an IT campus.

The Comtrade Group currently has more than 4,000 employees, a large percentage of whom are software engineers.

According to the 2017 Media Ownership Monitor project run by the Balkan Investigative Reporting Network, Jevrosimović was at that time the effective 100 per cent owner of the Serbian news portal telegraf.rs.

== Awards and distinctions ==
Jevrosimović is a member of the World Economic Forum and actively participates in forum meetings. He has received the Top Manager of Southeastern Europe Award, Most Innovative Investor in Southeastern Europe Award and IT Industry Legend Award in Monte Carlo. In 2008, Mr Jevrosimović became the first Serbian to be recognized as an honorary citizen of Boston for his company's contribution to the city's economy.
