= Endava =

British technology services company

Endava plc
- Type: Public
- Traded as: NYSE: DAVA (ADS)
- ISIN: US29260V1052
- Industry: Information technology
- Founded: 2000
- Headquarters: London, United Kingdom
- Key people: John Cotterell (CEO)
- Services: IT consulting and software development
- Revenue: ▲£772 million (FY2025)
- Net income: ▲£21.2 million (FY2025)
- Website: endava.com

Endava plc is a British technology services company headquartered in London, providing outsourced software development and IT consulting services. Its American depositary shares are listed on the New York Stock Exchange under the ticker symbol DAVA.

Endava operates client-facing offices and delivery centres in Europe and the Americas, including nearshore delivery locations in Eastern Europe and Latin America.

== History ==
Endava traces its origins to 2000 and was formed through the merger of the London-based consultancy Concise and the Eastern European software services firm Brains Direct in 2006.

In July 2018, Endava priced its initial public offering in the United States and began trading on the New York Stock Exchange as DAVA.

=== Acquisitions ===
Endava has expanded through acquisitions, including Velocity Partners (2017), which added delivery capacity in Latin America. In 2016 it merged operations with the Netherlands-based ISDC, which had operations in Romania and Bulgaria.

In 2021, Endava acquired the Croatian digital agency Pet Minuta (FIVE) and the U.S. consulting firm Levvel.

In 2021 Endava entered the Australian market, acquiring Australian companies Mudbath and DEK Technologies, and consultancy Lexicon in 2022.

== Services ==
Endava provides technology services and consulting, including software engineering and related delivery for clients undertaking digital change initiatives.

== Recognition ==
In 2018, Endava was ranked 22nd in The Sunday Times HSBC International Track 200 league table. It was also listed by the International Association of Outsourcing Professionals (IAOP) in its 2018 Global Outsourcing 100. In 2014 it appeared in Econsultancy's Top 100 UK digital agencies rankings by income.
