= Galenika a.d. =

Serbian pharmaceutical company

- Native name: Галеника а.д.
- Company type: Joint-stock company
- Industry: Pharmaceuticals
- Founded: 30 April 1991; 35 years ago (Current form); 18 July 1945; 80 years ago (Founded)
- Headquarters: Batajnički drum bb, Zemun, Serbia
- Key people: Ricardo Vian Marques (General director)
- Products: Generic drugs, over-the-counter drugs, medical devices
- Revenue: ▲€83.56 million (2022)
- Net income: ▲€13.88 million (2022)
- Total assets: ▲€119.16 million (2022)
- Total equity: ▲€91.02 million (2022)
- Owner: EMS (100%)
- Number of employees: 746 (2022)
- Subsidiaries: Galing d.o.o. Galenika Banja Luka d.o.o. Galenika Crna Gora d.o.o. Galenika Klirit d.o.o.
- Website: www.galenika.rs

Galenika a.d. (Serbian Cyrillic: Галеника а.д.) is a Serbian pharmaceutical company with headquarters in Zemun, Belgrade.

== History ==
Founded on 18 July 1945, Galenika was a major pharmaceutical drug-maker in the Balkans with exports to Europe, Africa and Asia. During its golden times, it was the greatest Yugoslav pharmaceutical company which controlled over 65% of SFR Yugoslavia market share.

In 1991, the company was bought by American ICN Pharmaceuticals, led by Serbian American businessman Milan Panić. Even during the 1990s Yugoslav Wars and massive debts of FR Yugoslavia toward the company, it kept operating positive. In 1999, by political decision of Slobodan Milošević's regime, the FR Yugoslavia took over the majority stake of the company. Following the overthrow of Slobodan Milošević in October 2000, the company returned on track and each year had tens of million euros of positive net income. As of 2006, Galenika remained a leader in research and development as the only pharmaceutical company in Serbia with an institute registered with the Ministry of Science and Environmental Protection.

However, from 2008 to 2010, Galenika rapidly accumulated debt to the point where it owed 130 million euros. Once controlling a majority market share in Serbia and former Yugoslavia, during the 2010s it became indebted company. By the 2010s, most of the Serbian formerly domestically controlled pharmaceutical market, has shifted in foreign hands.

Since 2013, the Government of Serbia has begun seeking a partner for Galenika through the privatization process. However, over the years several privatization auction processes have failed.

In August 2017, the Government of Serbia converted company's debts to state into shares in ownership structure, worth 14.696 billion dinars (122.81 million euros). As of 2017, Galenika controlled around 10% of market share in Serbia. In November 2017, Luxembourg's investment fund Aelius (related to the Brazilian largest pharmaceutical company EMS) purchased 93.73% of the company's shares from the Government of Serbia for a total of 16 million euros.

== Logos ==
Logo in use from 2002 to 2021

From 1945, Galenika has changed five different logos. The first logo of company was used from 1945 to 1992, the second logo from 1992 to 1998 (which has been marked as ICN Galenika), the third logo was used from 1998 to 2002, the fourth logo has been in use from 2002 to 2021, and the fifth and incumbent logo is in use since 2021.

== Fraud ==
In October 2018, several high-ranking former officials of the company were sentenced before Belgrade's Special Court for the "fraud by abuse of position", in which they damaged the company for multimillion-euro bills.
