= Nordeus =

Serbian video game developer

- Type: Subsidiary
- Industry: Video games
- Founded: 12 March 2010; 16 years ago
- Headquarters: Belgrade, Serbia
- Area served: Worldwide
- Key people: Branko Milutinović (CEO); Ivan Stojisavljević (CTO); Milan Jovović (CCO); Tomislav Mihajlović (COO); Uroš Sretenović (Financial Director)
- Products: Golf Rival; Top Eleven; Top Goal
- Revenue: ▲€17.15 million (2018)
- Net income: ▲€4.56 million (2018)
- Total assets: ▲€19.20 million (2018)
- Total equity: ▲€17.85 million (2018)
- Number of employees: 250 (2019)
- Parent: Take-Two Interactive (2021–present)
- Website: nordeus.com

Nordeus is a Serbian mobile game developer headquartered in New Belgrade.

== History ==
Nordeus was founded in March 2010 by former Microsoft employees. On 2 June 2021, Take-Two Interactive announced that they had acquired Nordeus for $378 million.

== Games ==
=== Top Eleven – Be a Football Manager ===
Top Eleven is a freemium football management simulation game. Players build and manage their own football clubs and compete with other players.

Originally launched on Facebook in May 2010, the game was released on mobile platforms in November 2011. In March 2013, José Mourinho became the game promoter for Top Eleven, appearing on the official game icon as well as in-game. The game contains officially licensed kits from clubs including Liverpool F.C., Real Madrid CF, Arsenal F.C., Juventus FC and Borussia Dortmund.

=== Golf Rival ===
Golf Rival is a real-time player versus player golf game, originally developed by the Beijing-based studio StarLark and released in 2018. Zynga acquired StarLark and the Golf Rival franchise in 2021 for approximately $525 million. After Take-Two Interactive's acquisition of Zynga in 2022, Nordeus took over Golf Rival in 2024 as part of the Zynga label, with a Golf Rival team formed in its Belgrade office alongside the StarLark team in Beijing.

=== Top Goal ===
Top Goal is a player versus player football action game. It was soft-launched in 2024 on both iOS and Android in selected markets, including Argentina, Australia, Canada, France, Italy, Mexico and Poland. The game is licensed by FIFPRO.

=== Heroic - Magic Duel ===
Heroic - Magic Duel was a fantasy-themed player versus player deckbuilding mobile game, released worldwide on iOS and Android on 4 July 2019. The game was removed from the App Store and Google Play on 5 September 2023, and its servers were shut down on 6 December 2023.
