= European debt crisis contagion =

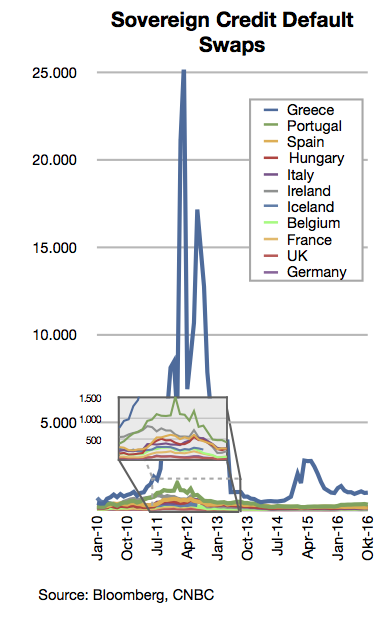
Sovereign CDS showing a temporary loss of confidence in creditworthiness of certain EU countries. The left axis is in basis points; a level of 1,000 means it costs $1 million to protect $10 million of debt for five years.

European debt crisis contagion refers to the possible spread of the ongoing European sovereign-debt crisis to other Eurozone countries. This could make it difficult or impossible for more countries to repay or re-finance their government debt without the assistance of third parties. By 2012 the debt crisis forced 5 out of 17 Eurozone countries to seek help from other nations. Some believed that negative effects could spread further possibly forcing one or more countries into default.

However, as of October 2012 the contagion risk for other eurozone countries has greatly diminished due to a successful fiscal consolidation and implementation of structural reforms in the countries being most at risk. None of the following countries is in danger of being cut off from financial markets.

== History ==
One of the central concerns prior to the bailout was that the crisis could spread to several other countries after reducing confidence in other European economies. In July 2011 the UK Financial Policy Committee noted that "Market concerns remain over fiscal positions in a number of euro area countries and the potential for contagion to banking systems." Besides Ireland, with a government deficit in 2010 of 32.4% of GDP, and Portugal at 9.1%, other countries such as Spain with 9.2% are also at risk.

Greece has been the notable example of an industrialised country that has faced difficulties in the markets because of rising debt levels but even countries such as the US, Germany and the UK, have had fraught moments as investors shunned bond auctions due to concerns about public finances and the economy.

== Most affected country: Greece ==
From all the countries, the one that was impacted the most from the debt crisis was no other than Greece. The main reason this happened is because of the huge debt and dependency of Greece on European Union loans creating a debt in 2015 bigger than 150% of the country's GDP. This led to many EU Commission memorandums that created a strategy to resolve the problem. The problem was so big that the exit of Greece from the EU or "Grexit" was considered an extremely possible scenario.

== Affected countries ==
Animated bubble chart showing national debt and deficit levels since 1999

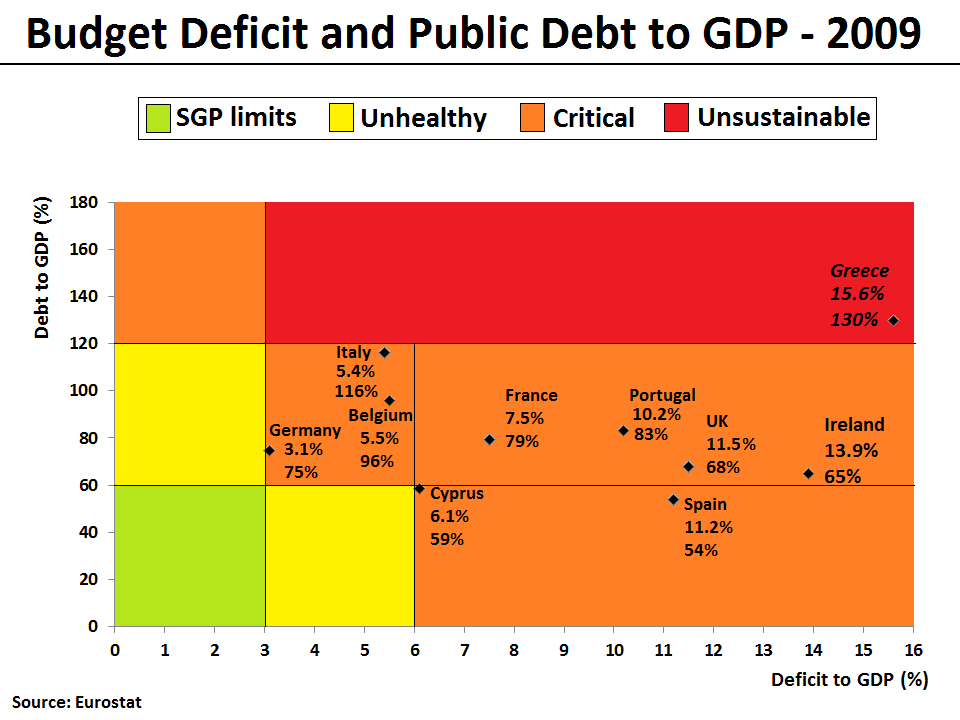
The 2009 annual budget deficit and public debt both relative to GDP, for selected European countries. In the eurozone, the following number of countries were: SGP-limit compliant (3), Unhealthy (1), Critical (12), and Unsustainable (1).

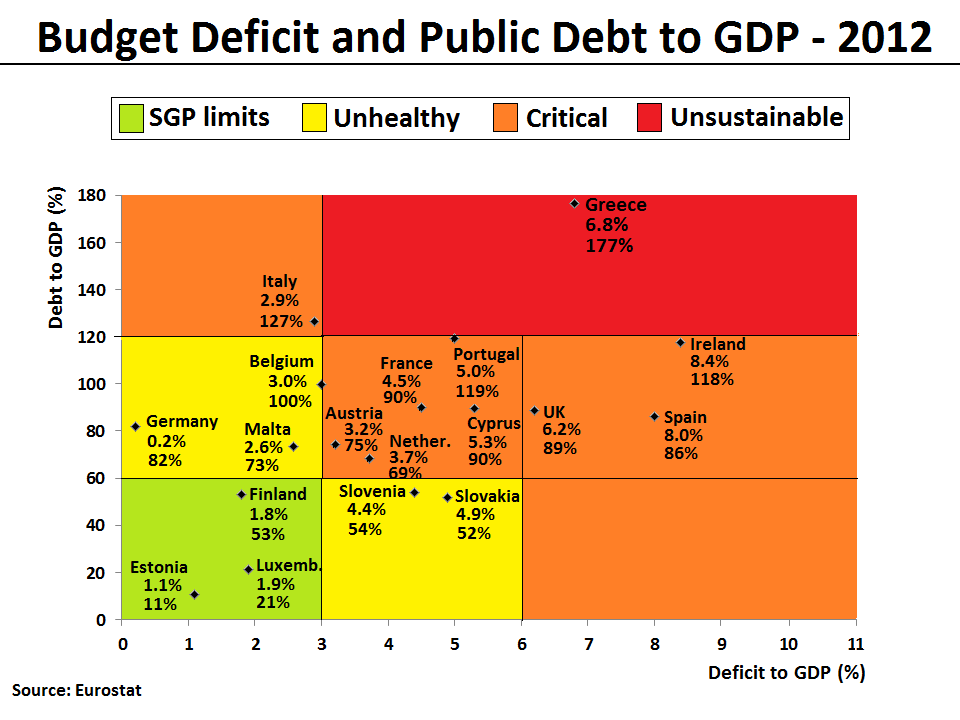
The 2012 annual budget deficit and public debt both relative to GDP, for all eurozone countries and UK. In the eurozone, the following number of countries were: SGP-limit compliant (3), Unhealthy (5), Critical (8), and Unsustainable (1).

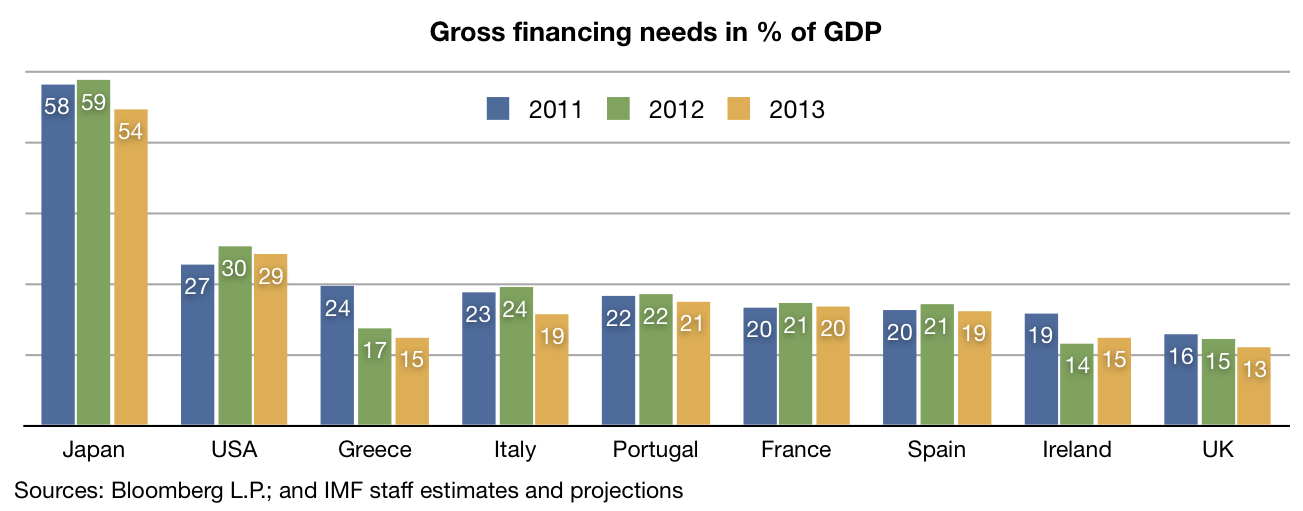
Total financing needs of selected countries in % of GDP (2011–2013).

Besides Greece, Ireland, Portugal, Spain and Cyprus, various other countries have been affected by the sovereign-debt crisis in different ways. As of November 2012, none of the following countries is in danger of being cut off financial markets.

=== Italy ===
Italy's deficit of 4.6 % of GDP in 2010 was similar to Germany's at 4.3 % and less than that of the UK and France. Italy even has a surplus in its primary budget, which excludes debt interest payments. However, its debt has increased to almost 120 % of GDP (US$2.4 trillion in 2010) and economic growth was lower than the EU average for over a decade. This has led investors to view Italian bonds more and more as a risky asset.

On the other hand, the public debt of Italy has a longer maturity and a substantial share of it is held domestically. Overall this makes the country more resilient to financial shocks, ranking better than France and Belgium. About 300 billion euros of Italy's 1.9 trillion euro debt matures in 2012. It will therefore have to go to the capital markets for significant refinancing in the near-term.

On 15 July and 14 September 2011, Italy's government passed austerity measures meant to save €124 billion. Nonetheless, by 8 November 2011 the Italian bond yield was 6.74 % for 10-year bonds, climbing above the 7 % level where the country is thought to lose access to financial markets. On 11 November 2011, Italian 10-year borrowing costs fell sharply from 7.5 to 6.7 % after Italian legislature approved further austerity measures and the formation of an emergency government to replace that of Prime Minister Silvio Berlusconi.

The measures include a pledge to raise €15 billion from real-estate sales over the next three years, a two-year increase in the retirement age to 67 by 2026, opening up closed professions within 12 months and a gradual reduction in government ownership of local services. The interim government expected to put the new laws into practice is led by former European Union Competition Commissioner Mario Monti.

One of the Renzi government's first official acts on 28 February 2014 was to issue a decree that released transfers of €570 million to the city of Rome in order to pay the salaries of municipal workers and ensure services such as public transport and garbage collection. The city of Rome has debts of almost €14 billion, which it plans to pay off gradually by 2048. The city of Rome has approximately 2.6 mn people and has been bailed out by the central government each year since 2008. Local politicians have been accused of clientelism, a system under which the huge army of municipal employees is seen as a source of votes rather than as servants of the public. The city has around 25,000 employees of its own with another 30,000 or so working for some 20 municipal companies providing services running from electricity to garbage collection. ATAC SpA, which runs the city's loss-making buses and metros, employs more than 12,000 staff, almost as many staff as national airline Alitalia. The decree allowed municipalities such as Rome the ability to increase taxes in order to pay for their civil service employees.

As in other countries, the social effects have been severe, with child labour even re-emerging in poorer areas. By 2013, wages have hit a 25-year low and consumption has fallen to the level of 1950.

=== Belgium ===
In 2010, Belgium's public debt was 100% of its GDP—the third highest in the eurozone after Greece and Italy and there were doubts about the financial stability of the banks, after the 2008-2009 Belgian financial crisis.

After inconclusive elections in June 2010, by November 2011 the country still had only a caretaker government as parties from the two main language groups in the country (Flemish and Walloon) were unable to reach agreement on how to form a majority government. In November 2010, financial analysts forecast that Belgium would be the next country to be affected by the euro area crisis as Belgium's borrowing costs rose.

However, the government deficit of 5% was relatively modest and Belgian government 10-year bond yields in November 2010 of 3.7% were still below those of Ireland (9.2%), Portugal (7%) and Spain (5.2%). Furthermore, thanks to Belgium's high personal savings rate, the Belgian Government financed the deficit from mainly domestic savings, making it less prone to fluctuations of international credit markets. Nevertheless, on 25 November 2011, Belgium's long-term sovereign credit rating was downgraded from AA+ to AA by Standard and Poor and 10-year bond yields reached 5.66%.

Shortly after, Belgian negotiating parties reached an agreement to form a new government. The deal includes spending cuts and tax rises worth about €11 billion, which should bring the budget deficit down to 2.8% of GDP by 2012, and to balance the books in 2015. Following the announcement Belgium 10-year bond yields fell sharply to 4.6%.

=== France ===
France's public debt in 2010 was approximately US$2.1 trillion and 83% GDP, with a 2010 budget deficit of 7% GDP. By 16 November 2011, France's bond yield spreads vs. Germany had widened 450% since July 2011. France's C.D.S. contract value rose 300% in the same period.

On 1 December 2011, France's bond yield had retreated and the country auctioned €4.3 billion worth of 10-year bonds at an average yield of 3.18%, well below the perceived critical level of 7%. By early February 2012, yields on French 10-year bonds had fallen to 2.84%.

In April and May 2012, France held a presidential election in which the winner François Hollande had opposed austerity measures, promising to eliminate France's budget deficit by 2017 by cancelling recently enacted tax cuts and exemptions for the wealthy, raising the top tax bracket rate to 75% on incomes over a million euros, restoring the retirement age to 60 with a full pension for those who have worked 42 years, restoring 60,000 jobs recently cut from public education, regulating rent increases; and building additional public housing for the poor. In June, Hollande's Socialist Party won a supermajority in legislative elections capable of amending the French Constitution and enabling the immediate enactment of the promised reforms. French government bond interest rates fell 30% to record lows, less than 50 basis points above German government bond rates.

=== United Kingdom ===
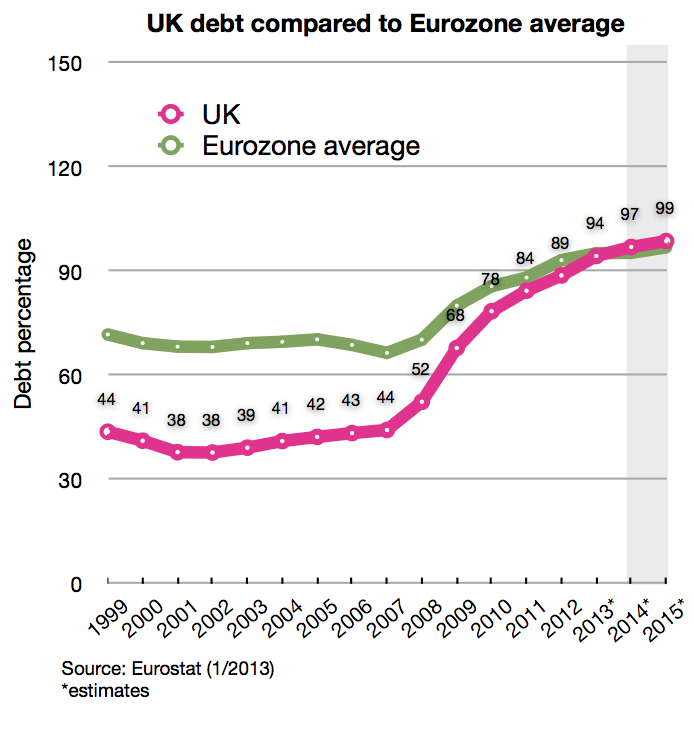
UK's debt percentage since 1999 compared to the average of the eurozone.

According to the Financial Policy Committee "Any associated disruption to bank funding markets could spill over to UK banks." The UK has the highest gross foreign debt of any European country (€7.3 trillion; €117,580 per person) due in large part to its highly leveraged financial industry, which is closely connected with both the United States and the eurozone.

In 2012 the UK economy was in recession, being negatively impacted by reduced economic activity in Europe, and apprehensive regarding possible future impacts of the Eurozone crisis. The Bank of England made substantial funds available at reduced interest to UK banks for loans to domestic enterprises. The bank is also providing liquidity by purchase of large quantities of government bonds, a programme which may be expanded. Bank of England support of British banks with respect to the Eurozone crisis was backed by the British Treasury.

Bank of England governor Mervyn King stated in May 2012 that the Eurozone is "tearing itself apart without any obvious solution." He acknowledged that the Bank of England, the Financial Services Authority, and the British government were preparing contingency plans for a Greek exit from the euro or a collapse of the currency, but refused to discuss them to avoid adding to the panic. Known contingency plans include emergency immigration controls to prevent millions of Greek and other EU residents from entering the country to seek work, and the evacuation of Britons from Greece during civil unrest.

A euro collapse would damage London's role as a major financial centre because of the increased risk to UK banks. The pound and gilts would likely benefit, however, as investors seek safer investments. The London real estate market has similarly benefited from the crisis, with French, Greeks, and other Europeans buying property with capital moved out of their home countries, and a Greek exit from the euro would likely increase such transfer of capital.

=== Switzerland ===
Switzerland was affected by the Eurozone crisis as money was moved into Swiss assets seeking safety from the Eurozone crisis as well as by apprehension of further worsening of the crisis. This resulted in appreciation of the Swiss franc with respect to the euro and other currencies which drove down internal prices and raised the price of exports. Credit Suisse was required to increase its capitalisation by the Swiss National Bank. The Swiss National Bank stated that the Swiss franc was massively overvalued, and that risk of deflation in Switzerland existed. It therefore announced that it would buy foreign currency in unlimited quantities if the euro/Swiss Franc exchange rate fell below 1.20 CHF. Purchases of the euro have the effect of maintaining the value of the euro. Real estate values in Switzerland are extremely high, thus posing a possible risk.

=== Germany ===
In relationship to the total amounts involved in the Eurozone crisis, the economy of Germany is relatively small and would be unable, even if it were willing, to guarantee payment of the sovereign debts of the rest of the Eurozone as Spain and even Italy and France are added to potentially defaulting nations. Thus, according to Chancellor Angela Merkel, German participation in rescue efforts is conditioned on negotiation of Eurozone reforms which have the potential to resolve the underlying imbalances which are driving the crisis.

=== Slovenia ===
Slovenia joined the European Union in 2004. When it also joined the Euro area three years later interest rates went down. This led Slovenian banks to finance a construction boom and privatisation of state assets by sale to trusted members of the national elite. During the 2008 financial crisis, construction stalled and once-sound businesses began to struggle, leaving the banks with bad loans of more than 6 billion euros, or 12 %, of their lending portfolio. Eventually the Slovenian government helped its banking sector unwind bad loans by guaranteeing as much as 4 billion euros – more than 11 % of gross domestic product, which in turn led to rising borrowing costs for the government, with yields on its 10-year bonds rising above 6 %. In 2012, the government proposed an austerity budget and plans to adopt labour market reforms to cover the costs of the crisis. Despite these recent difficulties, Slovenia is nowhere close to actually requesting a bailout, according to the New York Times. Slovenia is hampered by a nexus between government and the banks: the banks received a €4.8 bn bailout in December 2013. The banks own such businesses as supermarkets and newspapers. To obtain EU approval for the transaction, Slovenia needed to sell all of its second-largest lender Nova KBM and third largest player Abanka, along with at least 75 per cent of the biggest player Nova Ljubljanska banka.

=== Austria ===
The Eurozone crisis dented the economy of Austria as well. It caused, for example, the Hypo Alpe-Adria-Bank International to be purchased in December 2009 by the government for 1 euro owing to credit difficulties, thus wiping out the euro 1.63bn of BayernLB, among others. As of February 2014, the HGAA situation was unsolved, causing Chancellor Werner Faymann to warn that its failure would be comparable to the 1931 Creditanstalt event.

=== Romania ===
Romania fell into a recession in 2009 and 2010, when the GDP contracted −7.1% and −1.3% respectively, and a group including the IMF needed to finance a €20 billion bailout program, conditional on slashed public sector wages and hiked value added sales taxes. However, the GDP grew again by 2.2% in 2011 and 0.7% in 2012.

== See also ==
- European sovereign debt crisis
