= MK Group =

Serbian holding company

Coordinates: 44°49′01″N 20°25′37.8″E

- Official logo

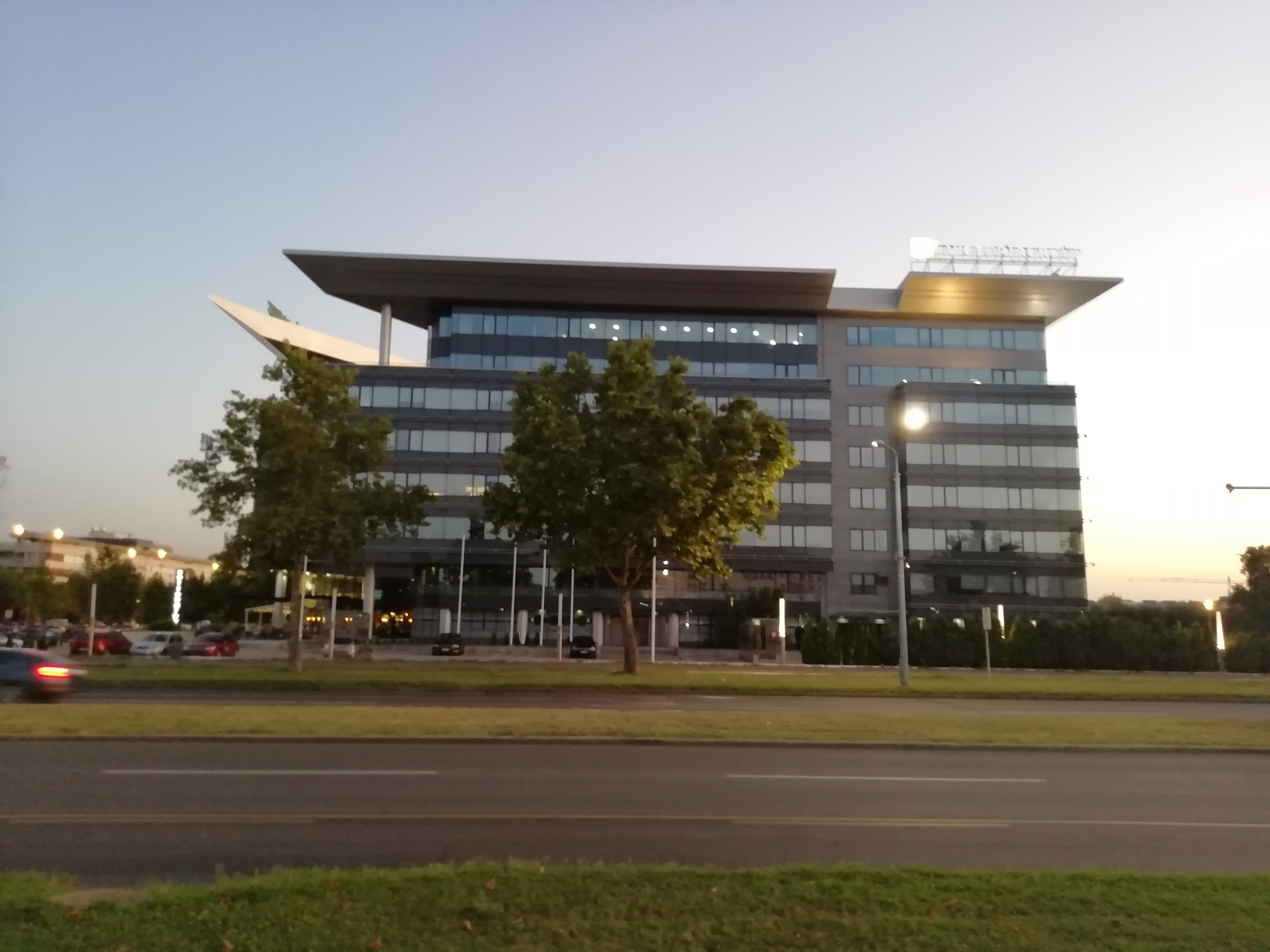
- MK Group Headquarters in New Belgrade
- Native name: МК Група
- Type: d.o.o.
- Industry: Holding
- Founded: 4 January 1995; 31 years ago
- Founder: Miodrag Kostić
- Headquarters: Bulevar Arsenija Čarnojevića 59a, Belgrade, Serbia
- Area served: Worldwide
- Key people: Jovan Purar (Director); Mihailo Janković (Director)
- Revenue: ▼€192.95 million (2023)
- Net income: ▼€39.56 million (2023)
- Total assets: ▲€661.20 million (2023)
- Total equity: ▲€334.85 million (2023)
- Owner: Wheat Corn Holding (100%)
- Number of employees: 1,992 (2023)
- Website: www.mkgroup.rs
- Footnotes; Business ID: 08179107; Tax ID: 101696756

MK (Serbian Cyrillic: МК Група) is a Serbian holding company which operates in the agriculture, banking, and tourism sector. The company was established in 1991, and has since expanded its business operations across South East Europe with a special focus on 4 countries in the region: Serbia, Slovenia, Croatia and Montenegro.

== History ==
MK Group former logo

In 1983, Serbian economist and businessman Miodrag Kostić began a private business, initially as an owner of a private company for trade, import-export and manufacturing activities. MK Group now operates in several countries: Serbia, Slovenia, Croatia and Montenegro.

== Divisions ==
=== Agribusiness ===
Since 2000, MK Group has managed sugar industry factories (factories Pećinci, Vrbas, Kovačica), more than 10 agribusiness enterprises, trade and warehouse complexes ("Granex-port", "Žito Bačka").

Sunoko, a subsidiary of MK Group, is one of the leading companies in sugar production both in Serbia and the region. In 2011, MK Group took over "Carnex" company (established in 1958), which produces meat and meat products. In December 2015, MK Group took over PIK-Bečej for a sum of 45.5 million euros.

Some of the most notable subsidiary companies are Carnex Vrbas (meat industry), Sunoko (sugar industry), Agroglobe (fertilizing and wholesale of agriculture products), PIK-Bečej (agribusiness) and others. Most of its agribusiness is concentrated on the production and wholesale of the cereals – corn, wheat, sunflower and soybeans. As of January 2016, MK Group manages around 29,000 hectares of agriculture land (around 290 square kilometers) in Serbia, of which it owns around 19,000 hectares.

From 2006 to 2017, it operated in Ukraine through Agro-Invest Ukraine, agribusiness company specialized in sunflower production and wholesale. As of January 2016, Agro-Invest Ukraine managed nearly 30,000 hectares of agriculture land (around 300 square kilometers) in Ukraine. In May 2017, Kernel Holding bought majority of its shares.

In June 2020, MK Group completed the process of acquisition of 67% of the shares of Victoria Group. With the integration of Victoria Group member companies, Sojaprotein, Victoria Oil, Victoria Logistic, Luka Bačka Palanka and VZS Stočna hrana, MK Group has acquired the status of majority owner, while the previous shareholders Milija Babović and Apsara Limited have remained minority owners. The company was sold in November 2021 to ADM Europe.

=== Banking ===
MK Group, through its subsidiary company MK Commerce, founded BDD M&V Investments brokerage firm which operates on the Belgrade Stock Exchange. However, BDD M&V Investments with its subsidiaries is not a part of the holding. M&V Investments controls a large ownership share of AIK Banka (since 2014), which later acquired and integrated another Serbian bank Jubanka in 2017. As of 31 December 2017, AIK banka has total assets of 1.767 billion euros.

Also, as of December 2017, AIK Banka is a majority shareholder with 75.99% of the Slovenian bank Gorenjska Banka. As of December 2017, Gorenjska banka controls 4.7% of Slovenian banking market share. In June 2019, AIK Banka fully took over the ownership of Gorenjska banka and thus successfully completed the takeover process in Slovenia.

=== Energy ===
Apart from real estate, MK Group has invested in developing renewable energy sources, whereby MK Fintel Wind, established in 2007, is one of the first companies in Serbia that have started green energy production using the wind-powered generators and solar panels.

=== Real estate ===
MK Group also manages several real estate properties through its subsidiaries like "MK Mountain Resort".

In December 2008, MK Group bought from "Internacional CG" the Kopaonik-based hotels "Grand" and "Sunčani vrhovi" and other real estate properties for a sum of 23 million euros.

Under auspices of "MK Mountain Resort" are the hotels "Grand" and "Angella" as well as the apartment complex "Konaci" and "Sunčani vrhovi" (all located on the Mountain Kopaonik). Hotel "Grand" is a home venue for the Serbian annual business conference Kopaonik Business Forum. Also, "Kempinski Palace" hotel in Portorož is operated by the MK Group. MK Group cooperates with world's famous hotel group Kempinski, and has invested in several real estate properties in Serbia and region. It also cooperates with another hotel group Sheraton Hotels and Resorts, and has invested in hotel located in Novi Sad.

In November 2017, "Istrian hotels", a subsidiary of MK Group, took over "Skiper Resort" hotel complex located in Istria. In February 2018, MK Group increased its ownership stake in the third largest Slovenian civil airport Portorož and is today the majority stake holder.

In June 2020, MK Group acquired the Slovenian branch of Heta Asset Resolution. At the end of 2019, MK Group was selected as the best bidder in the tender, and with the official approval of the Public Agency of the Republic of Slovenia for Protection of Competition and the approvals of the Competition Protection Commissions of Serbia and Montenegro, formal requests for payment and purchase were met.

== See also ==
- Agriculture in Serbia
