= Ljubljana Bank =

Ljubljana Bank may refer to:

- Ljubljana Municipal Savings Bank (1889-1945)
- Ljubljana Credit Bank (1900-1945)
- Ljubljanska banka (1955-1994)
- NLB Group, for Nova Ljubljanska Banka (est. 1994)

== See also ==
- Carniolan Savings Bank, the first modern bank in Ljubljana, initially known as Ljubljana Savings Bank (est. 1820)
