= Miodrag Kostić =

Serbian businessman (1959–2024)

- Миодраг Костић
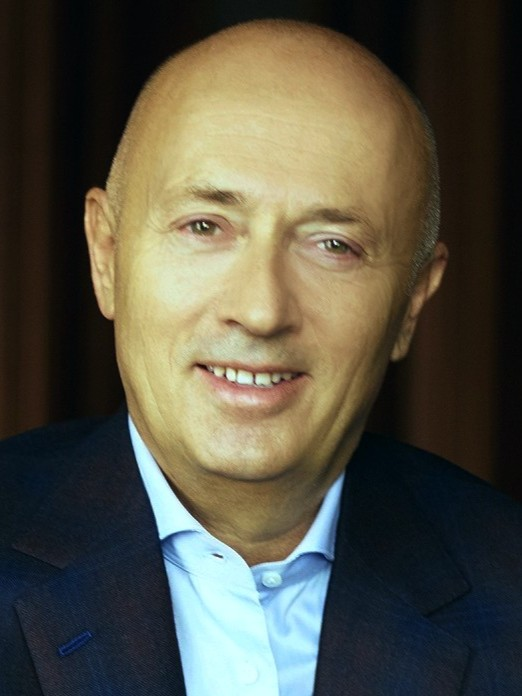
- Kostić in 2020
- Born: 25 August 1959; Vrbas, PR Serbia, FPR Yugoslavia
- Died: 13 November 2024 (aged 65)
- Education: The Faculty of Economics in Subotica, University of Novi Sad
- Alma mater: University of Novi Sad
- Occupation: Businessman
- Years active: 1983–2024
- Children: 3
- Mother: Roksanda Kostić

Miodrag Kostić (Serbian Cyrillic: Миодраг Костић; 25 August 1959 – 13 November 2024) was a Serbian businessman. He was the founder and owner of MK Group, a diversified holding company focusing primarily on agribusiness, green energy, and tourism.

== Early life and education ==
Kostić was born on 25 August 1959 in Vrbas, FPR Yugoslavia. Kostić graduated from the Faculty of Economics at the University of Novi Sad at the Department of Information Technology in 1983.

== Professional career ==
In 1983, he began a private business – initially as the owner of a private company for trade, import-export and manufacturing activities which in 1995 grew into MK Group. Since 2000, MK Group has managed sugar factories (factories Pećinci, Vrbas, Kovačica), more than 10 agribusiness enterprises, trade and warehouse complexes ("Granex-port", "Žito Bačka").

As of December 2017, Kostić’s MK Group had a total of 29 companies within its holding, most of them in Vojvodina. MK Group performs a variety of services, such as agribusiness, wholesale, real estate and banking. Subsidiary companies include Carnex Vrbas (meat industry), Sunoko (sugar industry), Agroglobe (fertilizing and wholesale of agriculture products), PIK-Bečej (agribusiness) and others.

Kostić was also the President of the Management Board of AIK Banka which, in June 2019, fully took over the ownership of Gorenjska Banka and completed the takeover process in Slovenia.

In June 2020, Kostić’s MK Group completed the process of acquisition of 67% of the shares of Victoria Group.

In June 2020, Miodrag Kostić’s company completed the acquisition of the Slovenian branch of Heta Asset Resolution.

== Death ==
Kostić died on 13 November 2024, at the age of 65.

== Awards and recognition ==
- 2015. Miodrag Kostić won the Medal of Honour Award as a sign of appreciation for his long-term support for SOS Children's Village
- 2015. Miodrag Kostić won the Laureate Award for the Special Development of Entrepreneurship in Serbia from Mokra Gora School of Management
- 2017. Serbian Association of Economists and the Serbian Association of Corporate Directors awarded Miodrag Kostić for outstanding contributions in the field of business economics and management
- 2019 Miodrag Kostić won the Golden Sign Award of the Red Cross of Serbia for humanitarian work

== Memberships and functions ==
Kostić was the President of the Board of Directors of AIK Banka and for the second term – the President of the Serbian business club "Privrednik". "Privrednik" cooperates with chambers of commerce and business associations in the country and abroad and the Government of the Republic of Serbia to improve entrepreneurship and management in Serbia and attract foreign investors.

He was also a member of business associations such as AmCham, British-Serbian Chamber of Commerce, Serbian-Italian Business Council, Swiss-Serbian Business Association, Serbian Association of Managers (SAM), National Alliance for Local Economic Development (NALED), etc.

Kostić was politically active, serving as the General Director of Serbia's Democratic Party from 1996 until the overthrow of Milošević on 5 October 2000.
