= Marijana Matthäus =

Serbian entrepreneur, businesswoman, writer

- Маријана Матеус
- Born: Marijana Čolić; 27 September 1971 (age 54); Vrbas, SR Serbia, SFR Yugoslavia
- Occupations: Business woman, Fashion designer, Entrepreneur, Writer, Former fashion model
- Spouses: Miodrag Kostić (m. 1990–1999) Lothar Matthäus (m. 2003–2009)
- Children: 3

Marijana Matthäus (née Čolić; Serbian: Маријана Матеус, née Чолић, romanized: Marijana Mateus; born 27 September 1971) is a Serbian entrepreneur, businesswoman, writer and European socialite based in London. She is the Founder and Creative Director of Lux Uniforms, which specializes in custom corporate identity business uniforms and Andaj, a luxury outerwear brand.

== Early life ==
Marijana Matthäus (born Marijana Čolić, in Vrbas, Serbia) developed her love for fashion early. As a young adult, she lived in New York City, where she graduated from Lubin School of Business in 1999. She enrolled at the University of Arts London – London College of Fashion in 2014.

== Career ==
In 1990, Matthäus created Obuća Metro, which became a major shoe brand in Serbia and ran the company from 1990 – 1996 as CEO. In 2003, she opened her first fashion boutique "My Style" in Budapest and a second one in 2007 in Salzburg.

A few years later, Matthäus established her own label, Marijana Class (later The Marijana Matthaeus Collection) and held her first fashion show during Belgrade's Fashion Week in 2009. On June 1, 2010, Marijana presented her first line of swimsuits. The creations were worn by competitors at national beauty pageants. Her fashion show I Am Mariana, was held at Hotel Moskva followed by the Black & White World collection in September 2011. The Flora Fashion Collection was held on the main stage of the Serbian National Theatre in Novi Sad in 2012 and in December of that same year. Matthäus held a second fashion show at Hotel Moskva, where she introduced her new Allure Baroque collection.

Matthäus expanded her business operations in 2010 and established a new venture called Lux Uniforms to specialize in custom designed corporate identity business uniforms. Later she established new luxury outerwear brand called Andaj London. This was initially designed for the British market and was launched and presented to media and clients at The Westbury Hotel in London in September 2016.

Celebrities and TV personalities often wear her creations, including one of the region’s most famous singers, Svetlana Ceca Ražnatović. She was joined by Milena Vasić, Snežana Dakić, Sanja Marinković, Jelena Jovičić, Vesna Dedić, Katarina Radenković and Ksenija Mijatović.

=== Other work and ventures ===
Matthäus became the face of the Samsung football-themed TV campaign in 2006. On April 27, 2010, Matthäus released her first novel Amouage.

== Personal life ==
Marijana Matthäus married businessman Miodrag Kostić, in 1990; they had three children. They are grandparents of 2 grandchildren. Her second husband was German football coach and former player Lothar Matthäus. She divides her time between London, Budapest and Belgrade. She is fluent in 5 languages - Serbian, English, Italian, Hungarian and German.

Matthäus is known for her philanthropic endeavors and regularly gives to charities and causes. She regularly asks local celebrities to donate to charities that help women in need.
