= Gorenjska Banka =

Bank in Slovenia

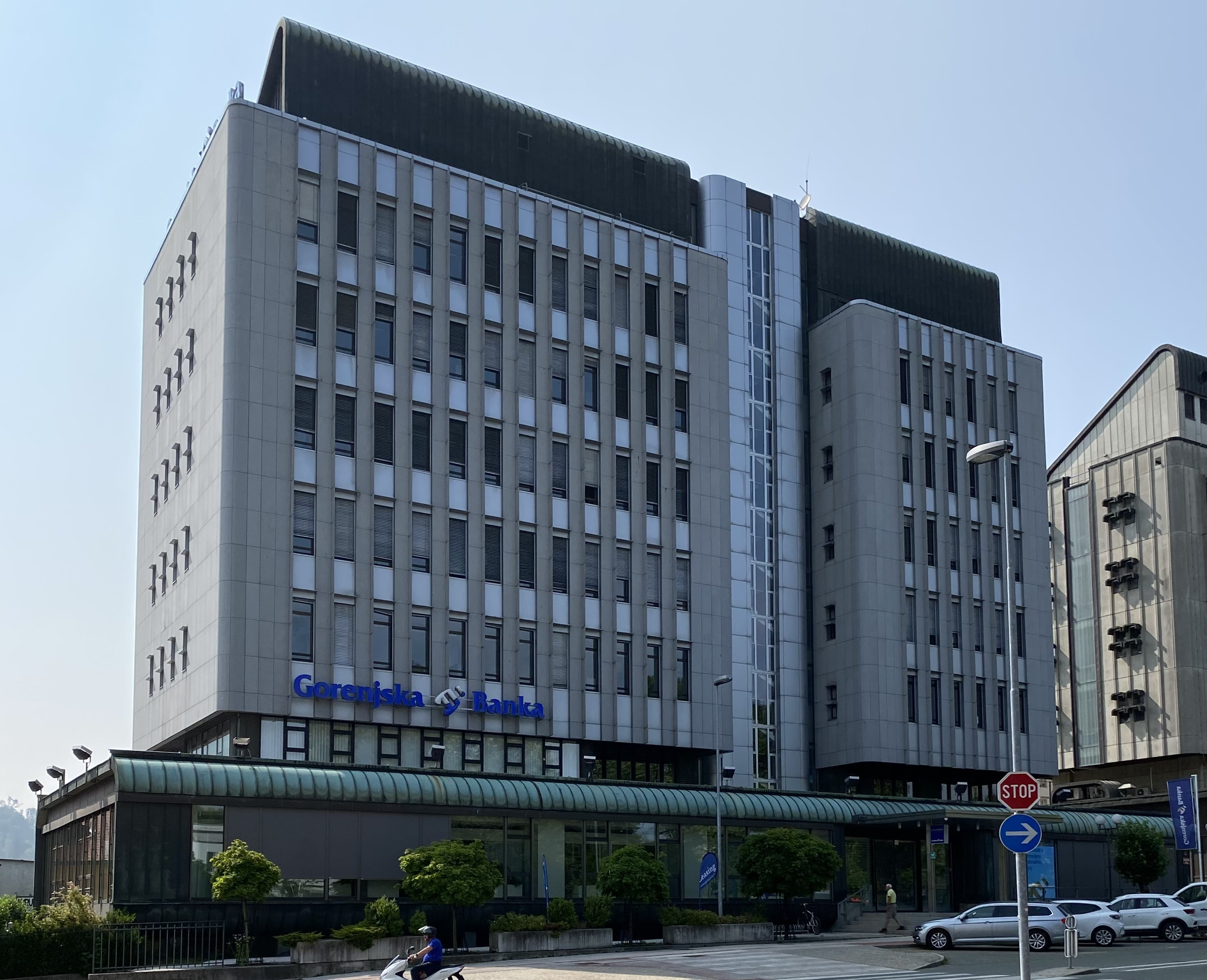
- Headquarters of Gorenjska Banka in Kranj
- Founded: 1996; 30 years ago
- Headquarters: Kranj, Slovenia

Gorenjska Banka is a bank in Slovenia, headquartered in Kranj and established in 1996 as a self-standing credit institution.

== Overview ==
Following a few years during which the National Bank of Yugoslavia was the only financial institution in the country, banks were established at the local level in 1955. A first municipal bank in Upper Carniola (Slovene: Gorenjska) was founded in Kranj on 25 May 1955. It was soon followed by other banks in Škofja Loka, Radovljica, Tržič and Bled. These were then reorganized into a joint bank which in 1972 became part of the Ljubljanska banka system. On 27 December 1989, it was transformed into a limited company in the system of the sister banks of Ljubljanska Banka. A process of separation from the Ljubljanska Banka group started in 1994 and led to Gorenjska Banka becoming an independent institution in 1996. By 2011 the Sava Group, a Slovenian conglomerate, held a controlling stake of 46 percent in Gorenjska Banka.

In 2015, the Bank of Slovenia determined that the Sava Group was too financially vulnerable to be an appropriate owner of the bank. In 2016, Serbian bank AIK Banka acquired a 21 percent stake in Gorenjska Banka, and raised it to 76 percent in 2018 by buying out Sava's stake and other shareholders.

Gorenjska Banka subsequently became a full subsidiary of Agri Europe Cyprus Limited (est.2011), the holding entity of a privately owned conglomerate led by Serbian businessman Miodrag Kostić with activities in south-eastern Europe and Ukraine. As a consequence, Gorenjska Banka became a sister company to AIK Banka, which is also controlled by Agri Europe. In 2020, Agri Europe Cyprus Limited has been designated as a Significant Institution under European Banking Supervision, and therefore Gorenjska Banka has been directly supervised by the European Central Bank since 1 January 2021.

== See also ==
- NLB Group
- List of banks in Yugoslavia
- List of banks in Slovenia
