= Nova Kreditna Banka Maribor =

Former bank in Slovenia

Nova Kreditna Banka Maribor (abbreviated as Nova KBM or NKBM, lit. 'New Credit Bank of Maribor') was a bank based in Maribor, Slovenia. It operated between 1994 and 2024, when it was fully absorbed by the OTP Group. For much of that period it was the second-largest bank in Slovenia, behind Nova Ljubljanska Banka (NLB). By December 2005, its market share reached 10.3 percent, behind NLB's 31.5 percent.

== Overview ==
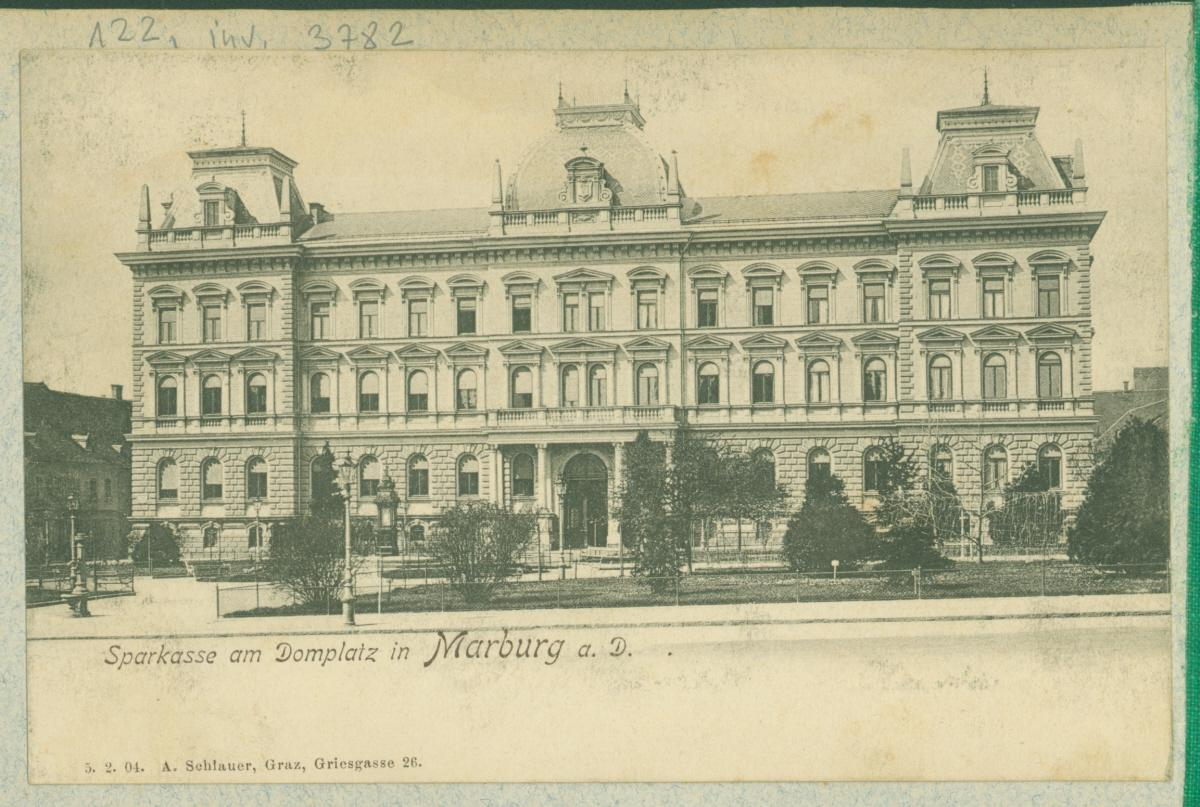
Postcard of the Maribor Savings Bank building, 1904

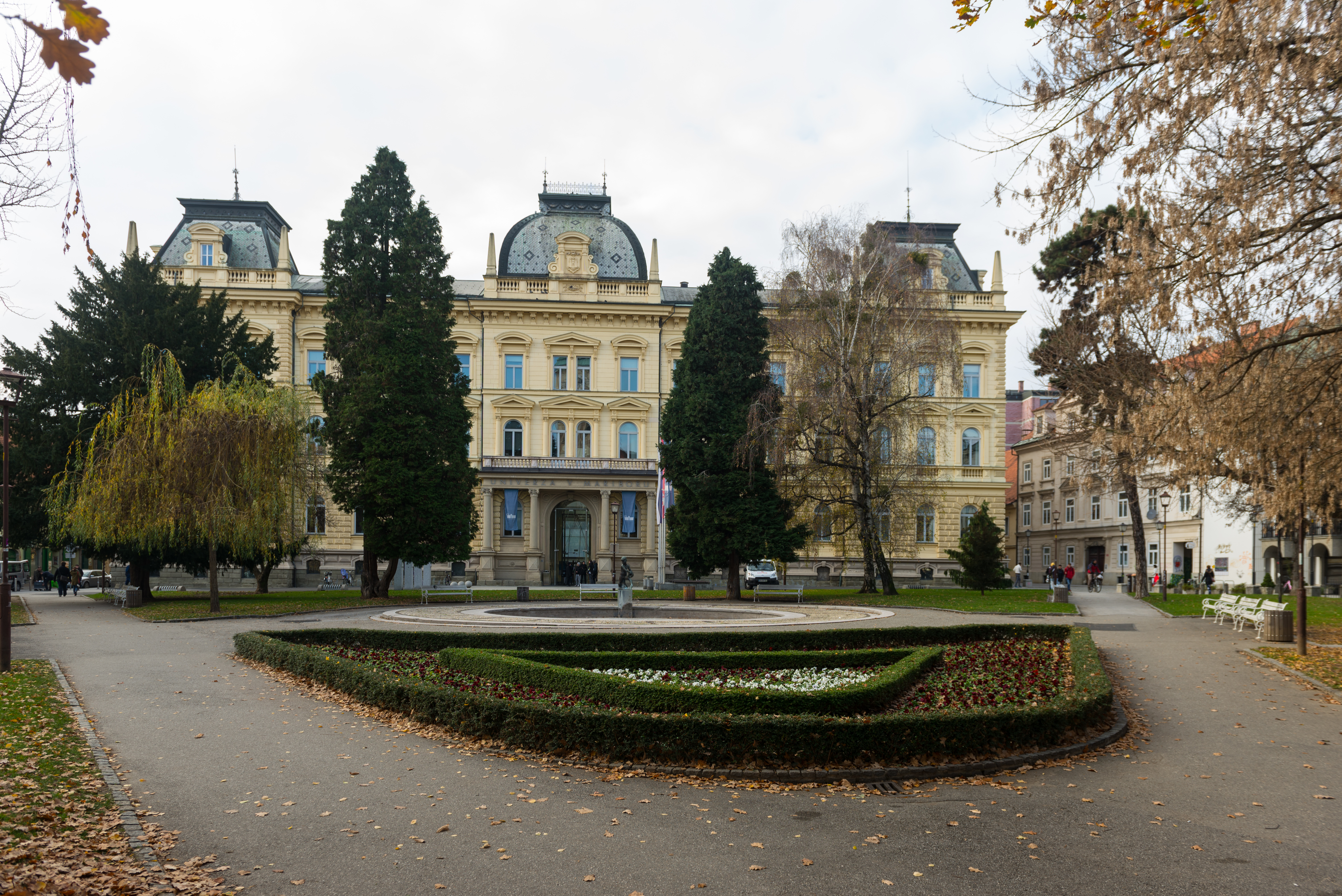
The same building in 2015, Rectorate of the University of Maribor

NKBM was established in 1994. It portrayed itself as the continuating entity of the municipal savings banks of Maribor (German: Gemeindesparkasse in Marburg an der Drau, Slovene: Mestna hranilnica Maribor, est. 1862), even though there was no institutional continuity during the Yugoslav era. Specifically, the municipal savings banks was liquidated in 1948 together with much of the Yugoslav commercial banking sector, and absorbed by the National Bank of Yugoslavia under a strict monobank system. It was partly re-established in 1952, then merged in 1962 with another local bank, Komunalna Banka / Okrajna Banka Maribor (established in 1955). The merged entity adopted the name Kreditna Banka Maribor (KBM) in 1965. In 1978 KBM became affiliated with Ljubljanska Banka as Slovenia-wide associated bank, then eventually severed the link in 1993 before the restructuring that created NKBM the following year.

Plans were made for NKBM's partial privatization in the early 2000s, initially projecting a sale of 65 percent of the bank's equity capital. These plans were repeatedly postponed, until NKBM was eventually listed on the Ljubljana Stock Exchange in 2007, following which the Slovenian state retained a 51 percent ownership stake. NKBM was again fully nationalized and delisted in 2013 during the Slovenian banking crisis; in 2015 its full re-privatization was announced, with 80 percent to be held by Apollo Global Management and 20 percent by the European Bank for Reconstruction and Development.

On 1 July 2016, NKBM acquired the Slovenian operations of Raiffeisen Bank International. In June 2019, it announced the acquisition of Abanka, by then the third-largest Slovenian bank; that transaction was completed on 1 September 2020.

NKBM was in turn purchased in 2021 by Budapest-based OTP Group. OTP phased out the NKBM brand on 22 August 2024, when it merged NKBM with SKB Bank, which it had acquired in 2019 from Société Générale. By then, OTP had a share of around 30 percent of the Slovenian banking market.

== See also ==
- List of banks in Slovenia
