= Carniolan Savings Bank =

Former financial institution in Ljubljana

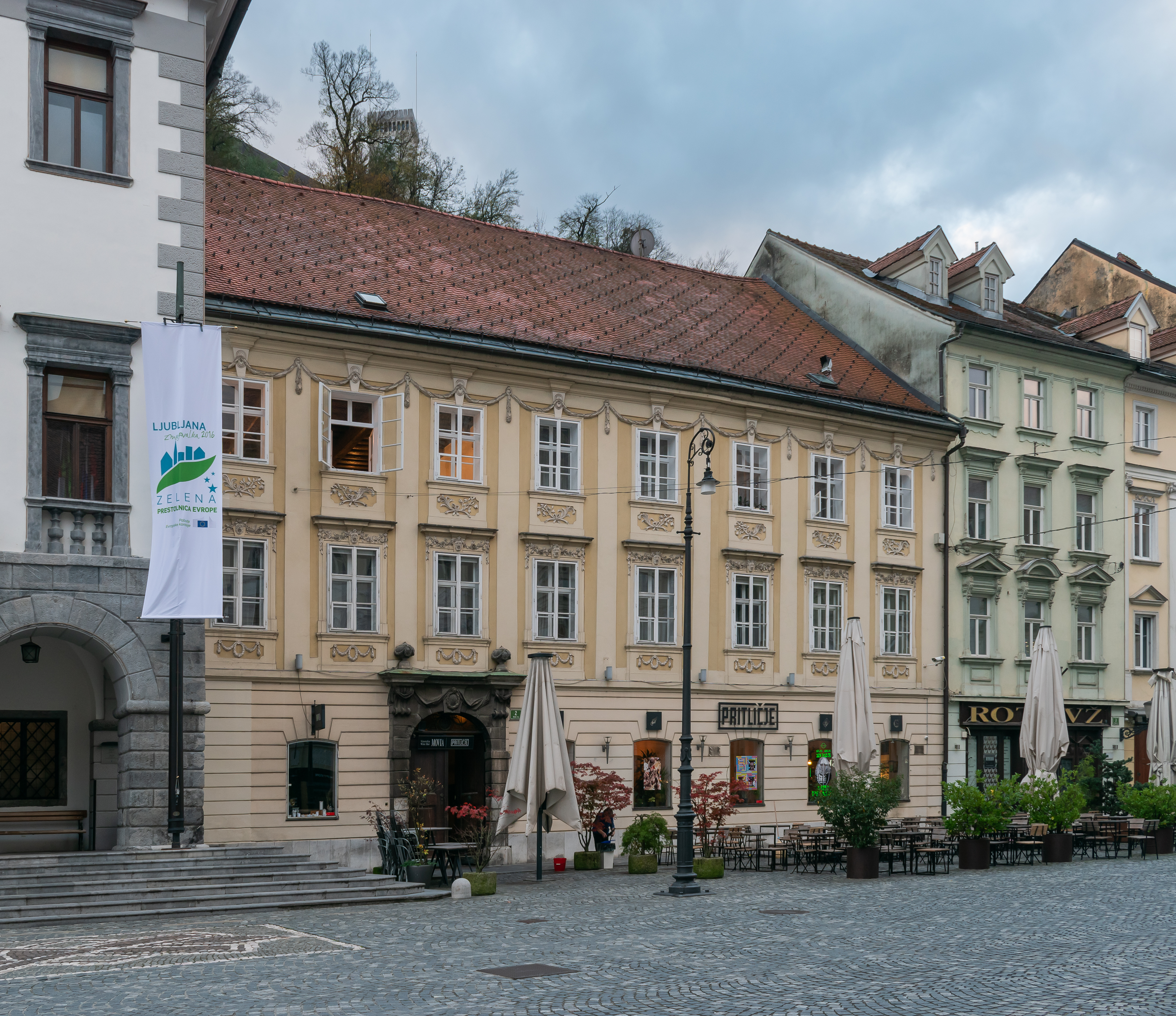
Galle House at Mestni trg 2, initial home of the Laibacher Sparkasse in 1820; also home of the rival Ljubljana Municipal Savings Bank from 1891 to 1904

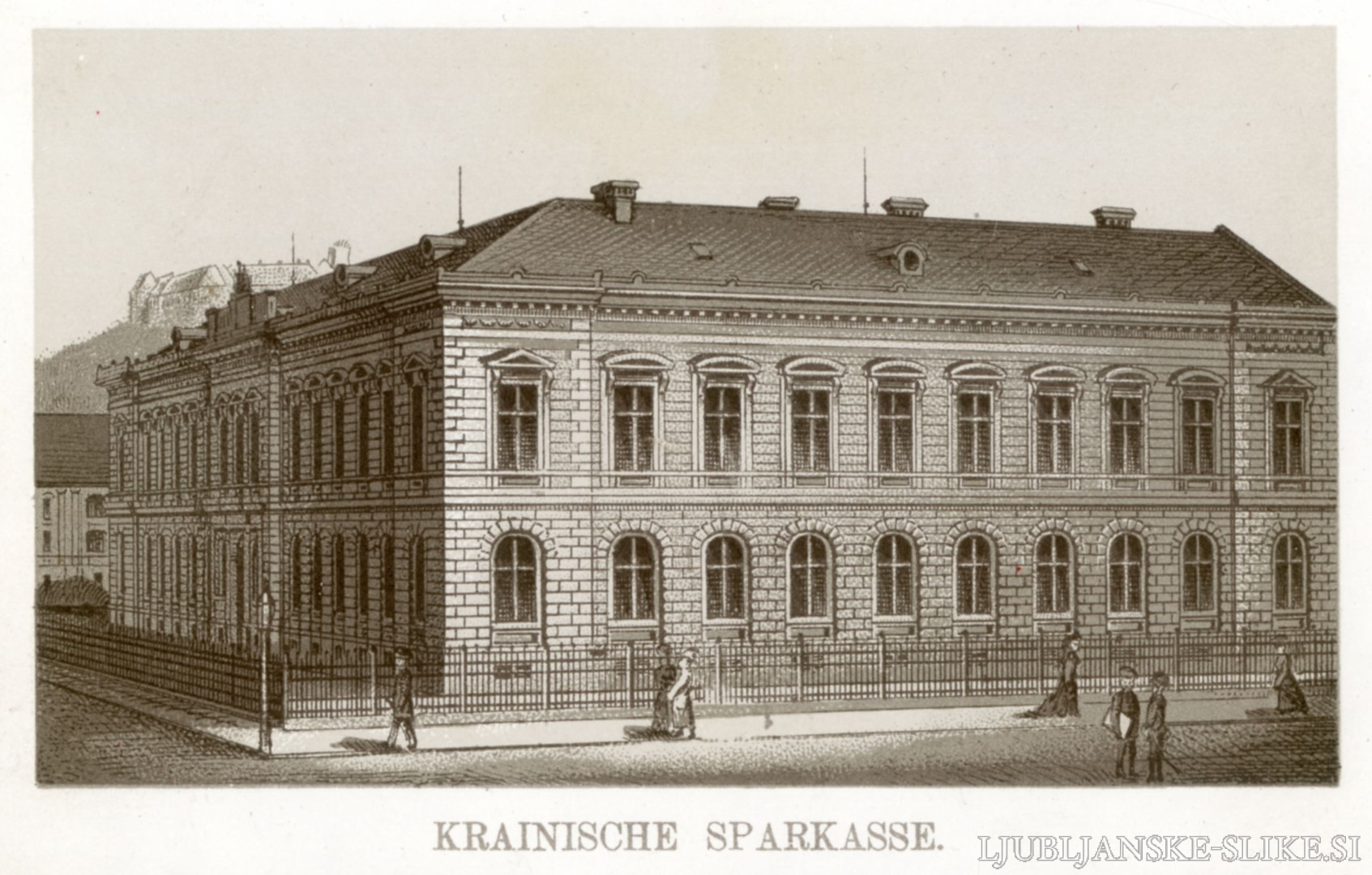
Engraving of the new Carniolan Savings Bank building with Ljubljana Castle in the background, 1880

The Carniolan Savings Bank (German: Krainische Sparkasse, Slovene: Kranjska hranilnica) was a financial institution in Ljubljana, the main city of the Duchy of Carniola in the Habsburg Monarchy and present capital of Slovenia. It was first established in 1820 as the Laibacher Sparkasse (lit. 'Laibach Savings Bank', with the German name of Ljubljana in use at the time), then from 1828 Illirische Sparkasse (lit. 'Illyrian Savings Bank', following expansion of its territorial remit and with reference to ancient Illyria) and, from 1845, Krainische Sparkasse. It then formally adopted its name in Slovene in 1909; was renamed Drava Banovina Savings Bank (Serbo-Croatian: Hranilnica dravske banovine) in 1929; and became the Savings Bank of the Ljubljana Province (Italian: Cassa di Risparmio della Provincia di Lubiana, German: Sparkasse der Provinz Laibach, Slovene: Hranilnica Ljubljanske Pokrajine) from 1941 to 1945 under Italian then German occupation. Its activity was terminated in 1945 under the newly established Socialist Federal Republic of Yugoslavia.

== Habsburg era ==
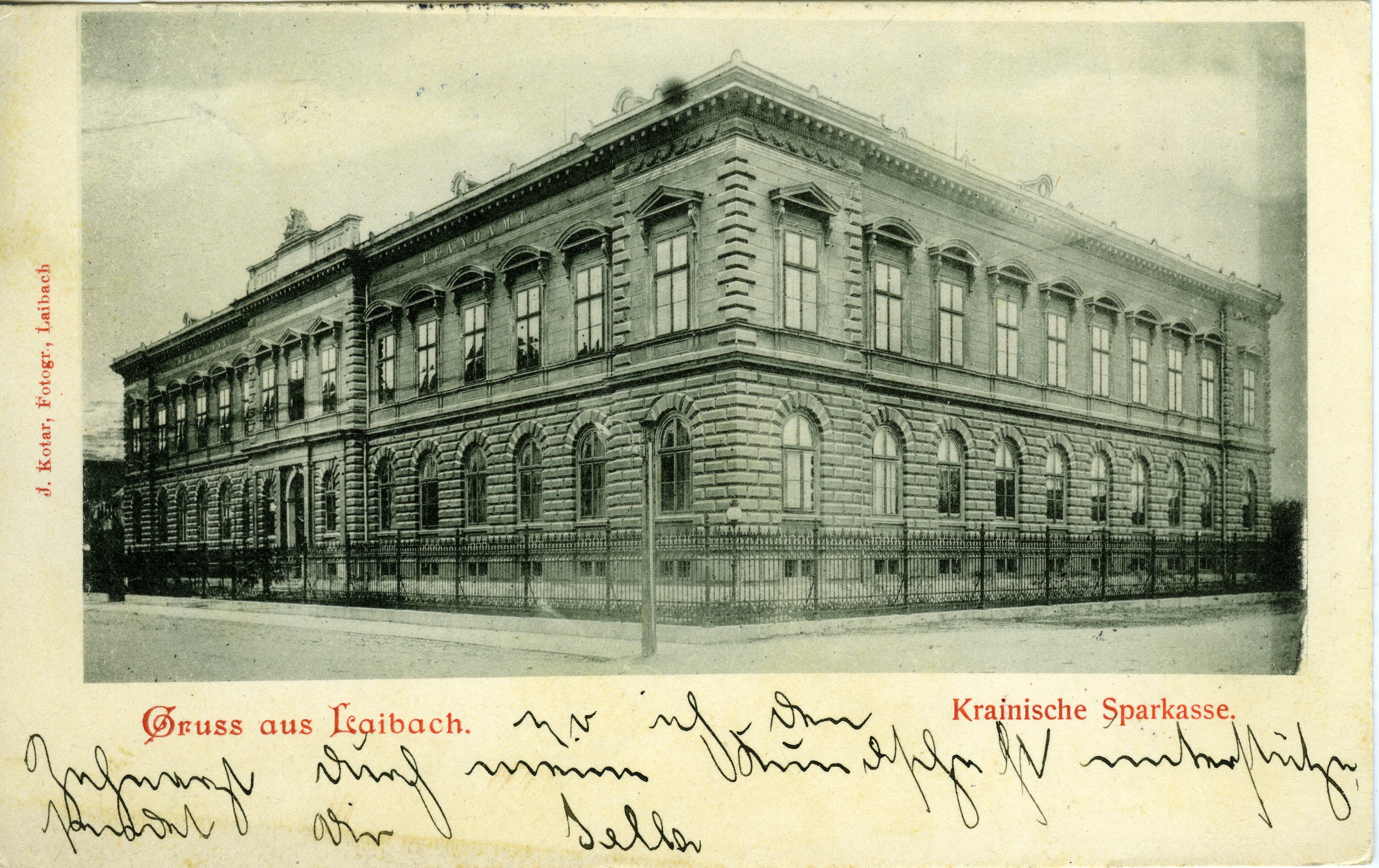
Postcard of head office building in 1899. The picture shows part of the building used by the pawn shop (German: Pfandamt) which was run by the Savings Bank

The Laibacher Sparkasse was founded on 4 November 1820 by a group of local businessmen as an associative savings bank (Vereinssparkasse), the second-oldest such entity in the Habsburg Monarchy after the Vienna-based Erste österreichische Spar-Casse founded in 1819. Its aim was partly to promote social cohesion by allowing everyone to earn a return on their savings, no matter how modest. It thus accepted deposits and invested mainly in property loans, for houses in and around Ljubljana and its surroundings and for larger manor estates. In addition to individual savings, it collected funds from the Catholic Church and charitable institutions. From 1826 on, it also provided lombard credit against securities, gold, and silver collateral. Initially run by volunteers, it employed its first salaried clerk in 1826. The bank was originally located in Galle House on the Town Square, just south of Ljubljana Town Hall.

For more than four decades, the Laibach/Illyrian/Carniolan Savings Bank was the only modern financial institution in what is now Slovenia. Following new enabling legislation, municipal savings banks (Stadtsparkassen) were then created in Ptuj (1862), Maribor (1862), and Celje (1865). In 1868 the region's first commercial bank, Laibacher Gewerbebank (lit. 'Ljubljana Commercial Bank'), was founded in Ljubljana. A competing institution, the Ljubljana Municipal Savings Bank (German: Laibacher Stadtsparkasse, Slovene: Mestna hranilnica ljubljanska), was founded by the municipality of Ljubljana in 1889.

In 1877, the Carniolan Savings Bank's general assembly approved the erection of a representative head office building, in the city's newly developed expansion across the Ljubljanica river. The bank relocated to its new home in 1880, and remained there until its end.

The early 20th century saw the rise of nationalism and communal tensions in the Austro-Hungarian Empire, in Carniola particularly between Slovenes and Germans. The Carniolan Savings Bank was viewed by Slovenian nationalists such as Ivan Hribar and Ivan Oražen as "an economic but also the political symbol of German power in Carniola". In September 1908, they called for its boycott by Slovenian clients, triggering a bank run that lasted until June 1909, during which 39% of all savers closed their accounts. The bank subsequently changed the name on its building from Krainische Sparkasse to Kranjska hranilnica in December 1909, and started publishing annual reports in Slovene.

On the eve of World War I in 1913, the Carniolan Savings Bank was the largest savings banks on Slovenian territory with 26 percent of aggregate savings bank deposits, followed by the Ljubljana Municipal Savings Bank (23 percent) and the Maribor Municipal Savings Bank (15 percent).

== Yugoslav era ==
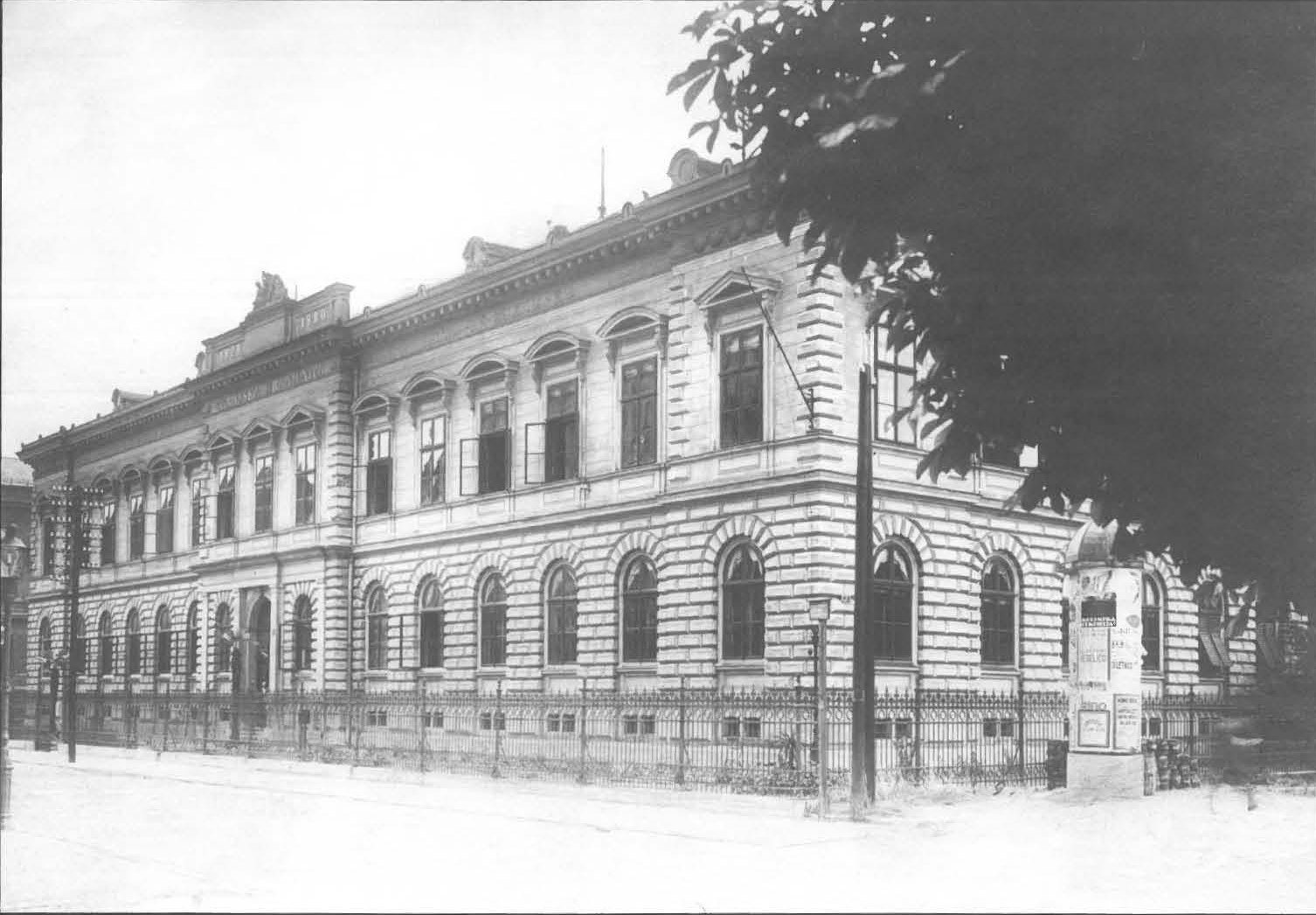
The head office building in 1925

Following the dissolution of Austria-Hungary, the Carniolan Savings Bank was restructured in July 1919, with a new board composed of Slovenians overseeing the remaining German management. In 1927–1928, it was taken over by the Ljubljana Oblast Board and was subsequently run as a public institution.

In 1929, new subdivisions of the Kingdom of Yugoslavia called Banovinas were introduced in line with the centralizing vision of King Alexander I, leading to the replacement of Carniola with Drava Banovina in the savings bank's name. By 1931, its market share had eroded, with 20 percent of savings in today's Slovenia while the Ljubljana Municipal Savings Bank's share had grown to 37 percent. That year, it started building a modernist new seat for its branch in Maribor, designed by architects Jaroslav Černigoj and Aleksander Dev.

Like other Yugoslavian financial institutions, the Drava Banovina Savings Bank was severely hit by the European banking crisis of 1931. In 1935, deposits started increasing again.

Following the occupation of Ljubljana and its surroundings by Fascist Italy in 1941, it was renamed after the newly established Province of Ljubljana under Italian occupation. It kept the new name under German occupation from 1943. In 1944, it briefly became a bank of issue, issuing the so-called Rupnik lira (after Leon Rupnik) or lira di Lubiana under German military supervision. The banknotes were denominated in the Italian currency, with text in German on one side and Slovene on the other.

As it was once again perceived as having submitted to German interests, the Savings Bank was liquidated in 1945 with all its assets and selected liabilities transferred to the Ljubljana Municipal Savings Bank, which itself was soon absorbed into Communist Yugoslavia's monobank system. Its head office building was taken over by the Central Committee of the League of Communists of Slovenia.

== Aftermath ==
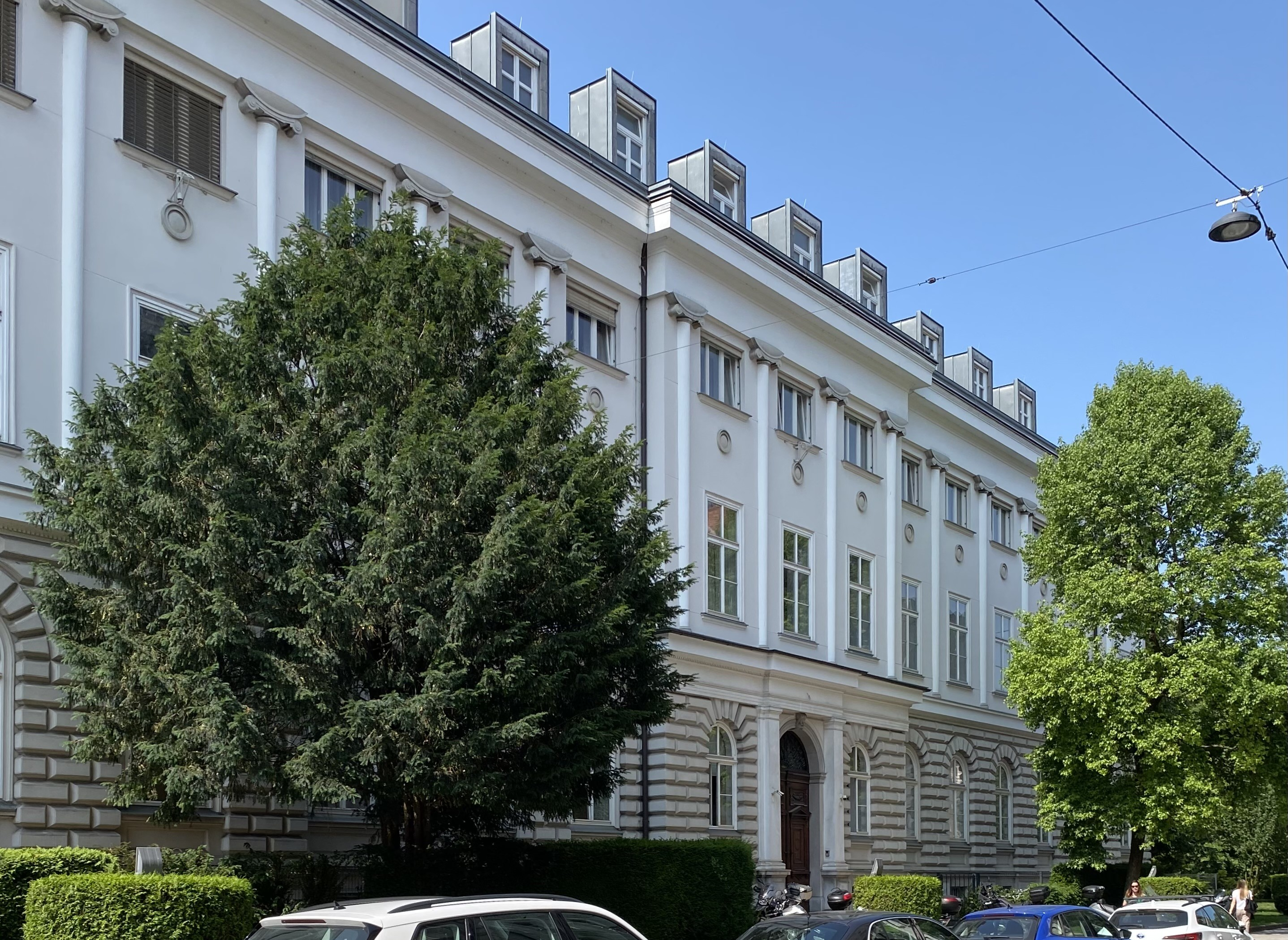
Carniolan Savings Bank building in 2025, with street level preserved in its 1880 state; upper floors have been remodeled

Around the time of Slovenian independence in 1991, the Savings Bank's former building was linked to the adjacent National Assembly Building of Slovenia and has since been part of the Slovenian Parliament complex.

In 2020, on the 200th anniversary of the creation of the original Ljubljana Savings Banks, the Slovenian Banking Museum (Muzej Banke Slovenije, operated by MUZA Museum & Gallery with sponsorship from NLB Group) opened in the former head office of its longstanding rival (and eventual acquirer) the Ljubljana Municipal Savings Bank, designed in 1902 by architect Josip Vancaš.

== See also ==
- First Croatian Savings Bank
- Ljubljana Credit Bank
- Gruber Mansion
- List of banks in Slovenia
- List of banks in Yugoslavia
