= List of banks in Slovenia =

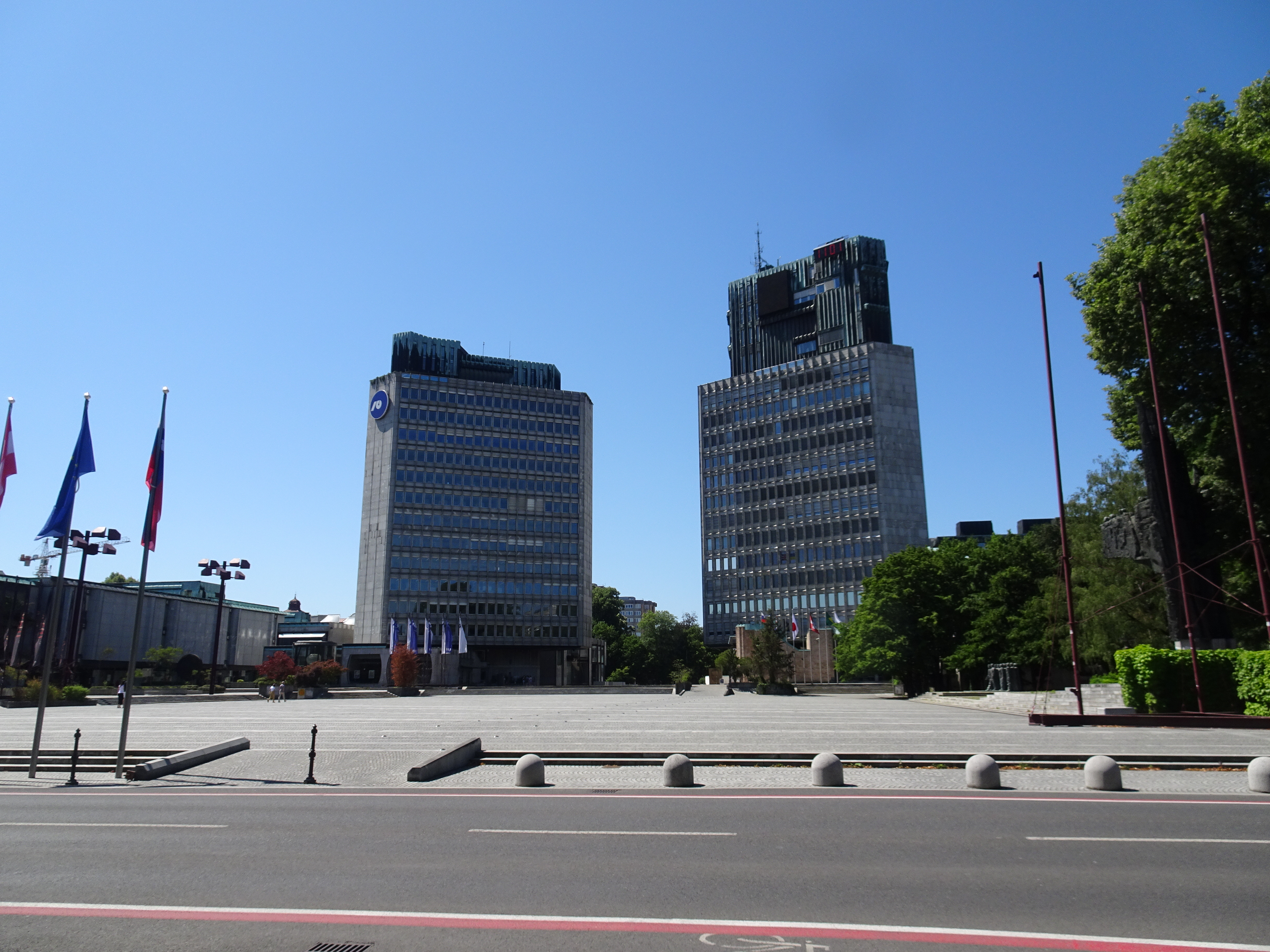
NLB Tower (left) on Republic Square, Ljubljana

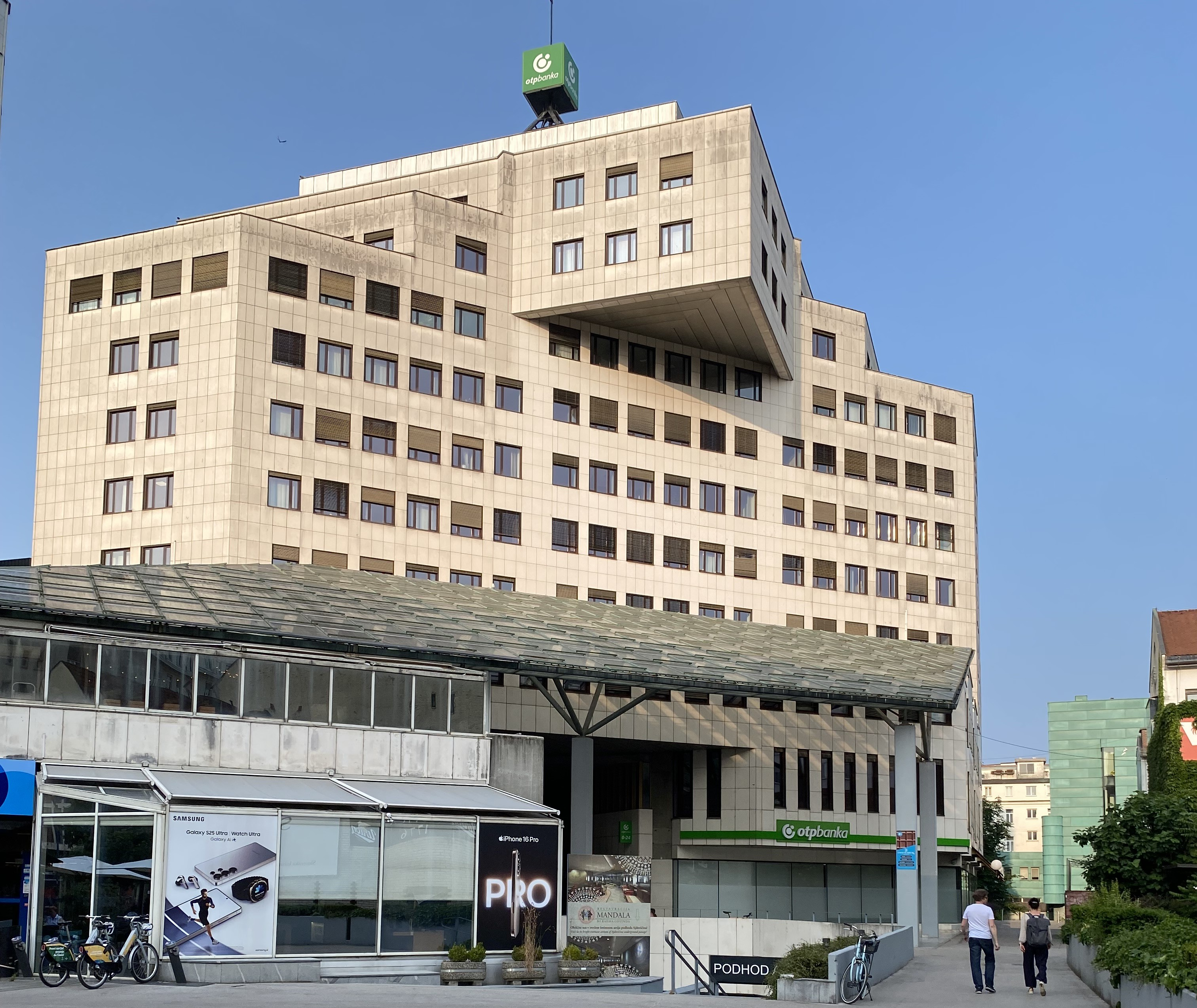
OTP Slovenia head office, Ljubljana

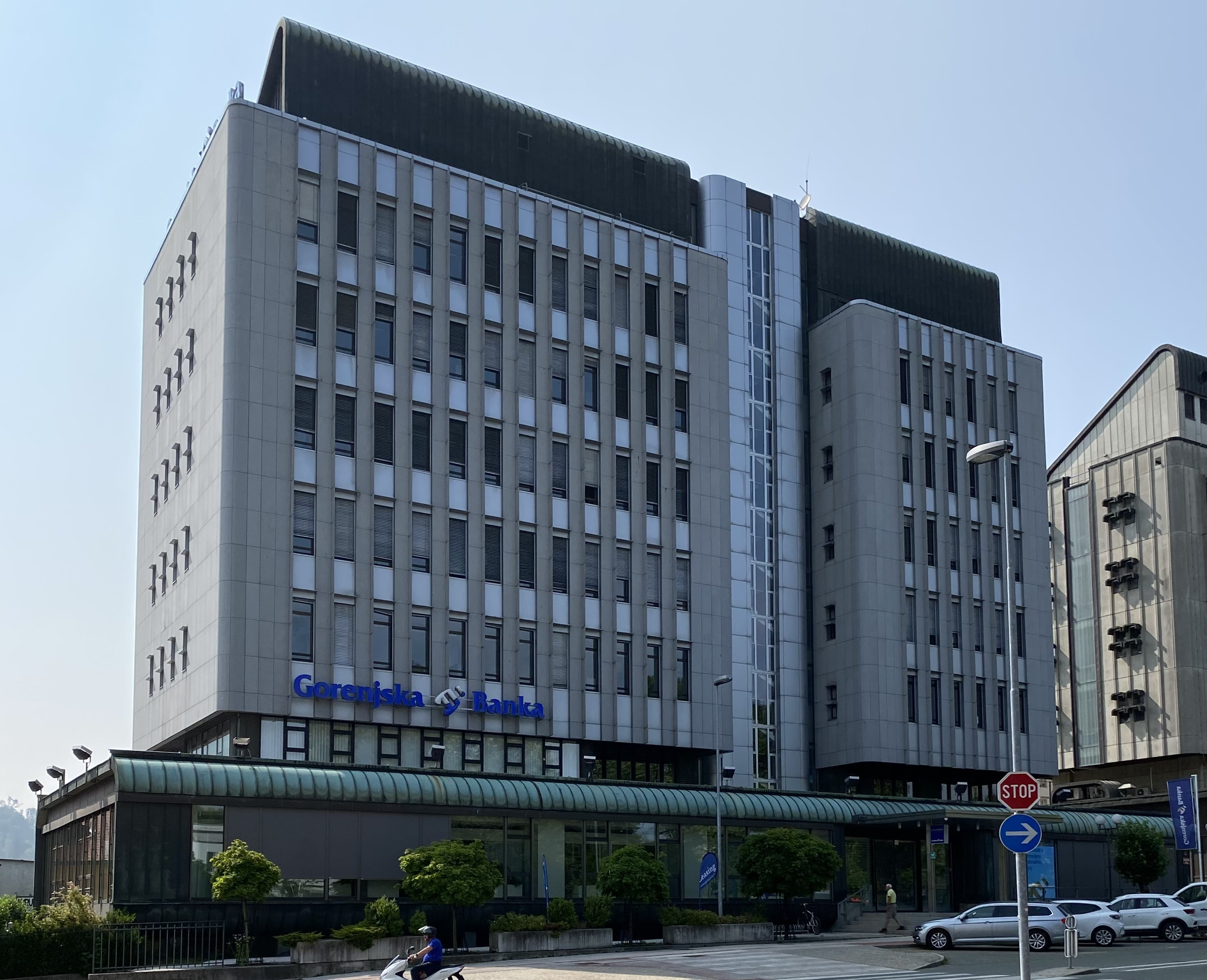
Gorenjska Banka head office, Kranj

The following list of banks in Slovenia is to be understood within the framework of the European single market and European banking union, which means that Slovenia's banking system is more open to cross-border banking operations than peers outside of the EU.

== Policy framework ==
European banking supervision distinguishes between significant institutions (SIs) and less significant institutions (LSIs), with SI/LSI designations updated regularly by the European Central Bank (ECB). Significant institutions are directly supervised by the ECB using joint supervisory teams that involve the national competent authorities (NCAs) of individual participating countries. Less significant institutions are supervised by the relevant NCA on a day-to-day basis, under the supervisory oversight of the ECB. In Slovenia's case, the NCA is the Bank of Slovenia.

== Significant institutions ==
As of 1 September 2025, the ECB had three Slovene banking groups in its list of significant institutions:

- AikGroup (Cyprus) Ltd, holding entity of Gorenjska Banka
- Nova Ljubljanska Banka dd, parent entity of NLB Group
- OTP Luxembourg Sàrl, Luxembourg holding of the OTP Group's operations in Slovenia

Other euro-area banks have significant operations in the country. A study published in 2024 assessed that of these, NLB had the largest volume of assets in Slovenia (€21 billion at end-2023), followed by OTP (€11 billion), Intesa Sanpaolo (€4 billion), UniCredit (€3.6 billion), and Gorenjska Banka (€2.4 billion). Austria-based Addiko Bank and Erste Group also operate in Slovenia through subsidiaries, the latter via Banka Sparkasse, whereas BKS Bank operates in the country via a branch.

== Less significant institutions ==
As of 1 September 2025, the ECB's list of supervised institutions included four Slovene LSIs, three of which are independent savings bank (Slovene: hranilnica). Of these, only Delavska Hranilnica was designated by the ECB as "high-impact" on the basis of several criteria including size.

- Delavska Hranilnica dd Ljubljana
- Deželna Banka Slovenije dd
- Hranilnica Lon dd Kranj
- Primorska hranilnica Vipava dd

As of October 2025, there were no branches of banks located outside the European Economic Area ("third-country branches" in EU parlance) in Slovenia, based on data compiled by the European Banking Authority.

== Other institutions ==
The Bank of Slovenia and Slovenian Export and Development Bank are public credit institutions that do not hold a banking license under EU law.

== Defunct banks ==
A number of former Slovene banks, defined as having been headquartered in the present-day territory of Slovenia, are documented on Wikipedia. They are listed below in chronological order of establishment.

- Carniolan Savings Bank (1820-1945)
- Murska Sobota Savings Bank (1873-1945)
- Ljubljana Credit Bank (1900-1945)
- Carniolan Regional Bank (1909-1930)
- Ljubljanska Banka (1955-1994)
- SKB Housing and Communal Bank (1965-2024)
- Nova Kreditna Banka Maribor (1994-2024)

== See also ==
- List of banks in the euro area
- List of banks in Europe
- List of banks in Yugoslavia
