= Hypo Alpe-Adria-Bank (Italy) =

Italian bank

Hypo Alpe Adria Bank
- Native name: Hypo Alpe-Adria-Bank S.p.A.
- Formerly: Finservice S.r.l.
- Company type: state-owned enterprise
- Industry: Financial services
- Founded: 1986; 1988 (became subsidiary); 2014 (spin off)
- Defunct: winding down since 2016
- Headquarters: Udine, Italy (registered); Tavagnacco, Italy (de facto)
- Number of locations: 26 (2015)
- Area served: Northern Italy
- Key people: Florian Schumi (chairman)
- Services: Retail and corporate banking
- Net income: ▼€ negative 120 million (2016)
- Total assets: ▼€1.257 billion (2016)
- Total equity: ▼€123 million (2016)
- Owner: Austria
- Parent: HBI-Bundesholding (100%)
- Capital ratio: ▼13.16% (CET1 Capital ratio)
- Website: www.hypo-alpe-adria.it
- Footnotes / references source

Hypo Alpe-Adria-Bank S.p.A. also known as HBI was an Italian bank based in Tavagnacco, in the Province of Udine, Friuli – Venezia Giulia region. The registered office of the bank was located in Udine. In the past, the bank was a subsidiary of Hypo Alpe-Adria-Bank International, which was planned to wind down as "bad bank" and separate saleable assets in 2013 as "good bank". In 2014 the subsidiary was spun off from the bad bank as a separate wind-down unit. As at 31 December 2014, Hypo Italy was a subsidiary HBI-Bundesholding A.G., a Vienna-based sub-holding company for the government of Austria.

The bank had 19 branches in Italy: Veneto (7), Lombardy (6) and Friuli – Venezia Giulia (6) before the company closed all the branches on 23 December 2016. The Italian leasing department of Hypo Alpe-Adria Italy remained in the bad bank, now known as Heta Asset Resolution Italia S.r.l., a subsidiary of Heta Asset Resolution (sold in 2016 to a private equity fund).

== History ==
The bank was founded in 1986 as Finservice S.r.l., a company provides finance lease. In 1988 it was purchased by Kärntner Landes und Hypothekenbank (later trading as Hypo Alpe-Adria-Bank). The bank was renamed into Hyposervice S.r.l. and became società per azioni in 1990. In 1998 the company became a bank. The parent company was nationalized in 2009. In March 2014 the Italian subsidiary was spin off from the bad bank, except the leasing department. The entire board of directors except the independent director was replaced. Former chairman Johannes Leopold Proksch, vice-chairman Rainer Sichert, director Lorenzo Snaidero and Stephan Holzer were all fined by the Bank of Italy. Italian Guardia di Finanza also started an investigation on the former leasing department on possible overcharging interests from the borrower in October 2014.

As at 31 December 2014, the Common Equity Tier 1 ratio had fallen to 0.58%, much lower than Basel III requirement of 4.5%. In 2014 Hypo Italy had 26 branches.

In 2016, the bank also made an open invitation to submit expression of interest to acquire the branches and performing mortgage portfolio. In 2016 Banca Valsabbina purchased seven branches from Hypo as well as a loan portfolio of €150 million.

In April 2017 another pool of assets was under sale.

== See also ==
- List of banks in Italy
