= Addiko Bank =

Austrian banking and financial services company

- Formerly: Hypo Group Alpe Adria
- Type: Aktiengesellschaft
- Industry: Finance and Insurance
- Predecessor: Balkans banks of Hypo Alpe-Adria-Bank International
- Founded: 2016; Rebranded to Addiko Bank
- Headquarters: Vienna, Austria
- Products: Consumer banking, Consumer Finance
- Net income: ▼€44 million (2025)
- Total assets: ▲€6.4 billion (2025)
- Total equity: ▲€898.5 million (2025)
- Owner
- Capital ratio: 21.1% (Tier 1)
- Website: https://www.addiko.com

The Addiko Bank is an Austrian banking group with numerous cross-border activities in the Alps-Adriatic region. The group is active in Croatia, Slovenia, Bosnia and Herzegovina, Serbia, Montenegro and Romania. However, the bank itself did not have a banking license in Austria, which now owned by Austrian Anadi Bank, another bank that was spun off Hypo Alpe-Adria-Bank International AG.

Addiko has been designated in 2020 as a Significant Institution under the criteria of European Banking Supervision, and as a consequence is directly supervised by the European Central Bank.

== History ==
Addiko Group was established when the former Hypo-Alpe-Adria International AG spun off its CSEE banking subsidiaries. Austria-based Hypo-Alpe-Adria had established business units in the region after 1996 by offering leasing businesses. The bank later added more banking activities including consumer, corporate and public finance. The company experienced the most significant growth from 2002 onwards, with a focus on risky and large-scale financings especially in real estate and tourism projects, until the 2008 financial crisis and its nationalization the same year.

In 2015, AI Lake, indirectly owned by funds advised by Advent International, a global private equity investor, and the European Bank for Reconstruction and Development (EBRD), acquired Addiko Bank AG following a sales process required by the European Commission.

Addiko Bank has been operating under its current name since July 2016, reflecting the rebranding of Addiko Group.

In April 2026, Raiffeisen Bank International launched a takeover offer for Addiko Bank, while NLB Group launched a competing bid shortly after. By the end of the acceptance period in July 2026, Raiffeisen Bank International had secured a majority stake of 56.16% in Addiko, while NLB bid had failed.

== See also ==
- List of banks in Austria
- List of banks in the euro area
- List of banks in Serbia
