= MK Fintel Wind =

- Company type: Joint-stock company
- Industry: Electric utility
- Founded: 6 March 2008; 18 years ago
- Headquarters: Belgrade, Serbia
- Area served: Serbia
- Key people: Tiziano Giovannetti (General director)
- Owner: Fintel Energia Group S.p.A. (54.00%); MK Group (46.00%)
- Footnotes / references Business ID: 20392126; Tax ID: 105512758

MK Fintel Wind is a Serbian renewable energy company. It is a joint venture between MK Group and the Italian Fintel Energia Group.

== History ==
MK Fintel Wind was established on 6 March 2008.

The company was the first to build and operate wind farms in Serbia. As of September 2016, the company had two wind farms in Serbia ("Kula" and "La Piccolina"), with 16.5 MW of installed capacity.

In February 2018, MK Fintel Wind announced that it has signed an 81.5 million euros loan to finish the first phase of the construction of Košava wind farm, located near the city of Vršac. On September 23, 2019, "Košava 1" wind farm with capacity of 69 MW was opened; it was company's third opened wind farm in Serbia.

== See also ==
- Energy in Serbia
