= Primož Dolenc =

Governor of the Bank of Slovenia
- Incumbent
- Assumed office 1 March 2026
- Preceded by: Boštjan Vasle

Vice-Governor of the Bank of Slovenia
- In office April 2016 – February 2026

Personal details
- Born: 1976 (age 49–50) Slovenia
- Education: University of Ljubljana (PhD)
- Occupation: Economist, Banker

Primož Dolenc (born 1976) is a Slovenian economist and central banker who is currently serving as the Governor of the Bank of Slovenia. He took office on 1 March 2026, succeeding Boštjan Vasle. A sgovernor, he also sits in the Governing Council of the European Central Bank.

== Education ==
Dolenc graduated from the Faculty of Economics at the University of Ljubljana, where he also completed his Master's and PhD studies. In 2006, he defended his doctoral thesis on sovereign assets and liability management.

== Career ==
Between 2000 and 2006, Dolenc held various advisory and managerial positions, notably within the Slovenian Ministry of Finance (The Treasury). He later worked in the private banking sector, serving as Director of Risk Management at Deželna banka Slovenije from 2013 to 2016.

Parallel to his banking career, he is a full professor at the University of Primorska, where he teaches finance, banking, and macroeconomics. He has authored numerous scientific articles and several textbooks on financial markets.

=== Bank of Slovenia ===
In April 2016, Dolenc was appointed Vice-Governor and member of the Governing Board of the Bank of Slovenia. During his tenure, he was responsible for financial stability, macroprudential policy, and risk management.

He served as Acting Governor on two occasions: first from May 2018 to January 2019, and again from January 2025 following the expiration of Boštjan Vasle's term. The National Assembly appointed Dolenc governor on 3 February 2026 by 55 votes in a secret ballot. He took office on 1 March for a six-year term.

As Governor, he also represents Slovenia on the Governing Council of the European Central Bank
