= Abanka =

Former bank in Slovenia

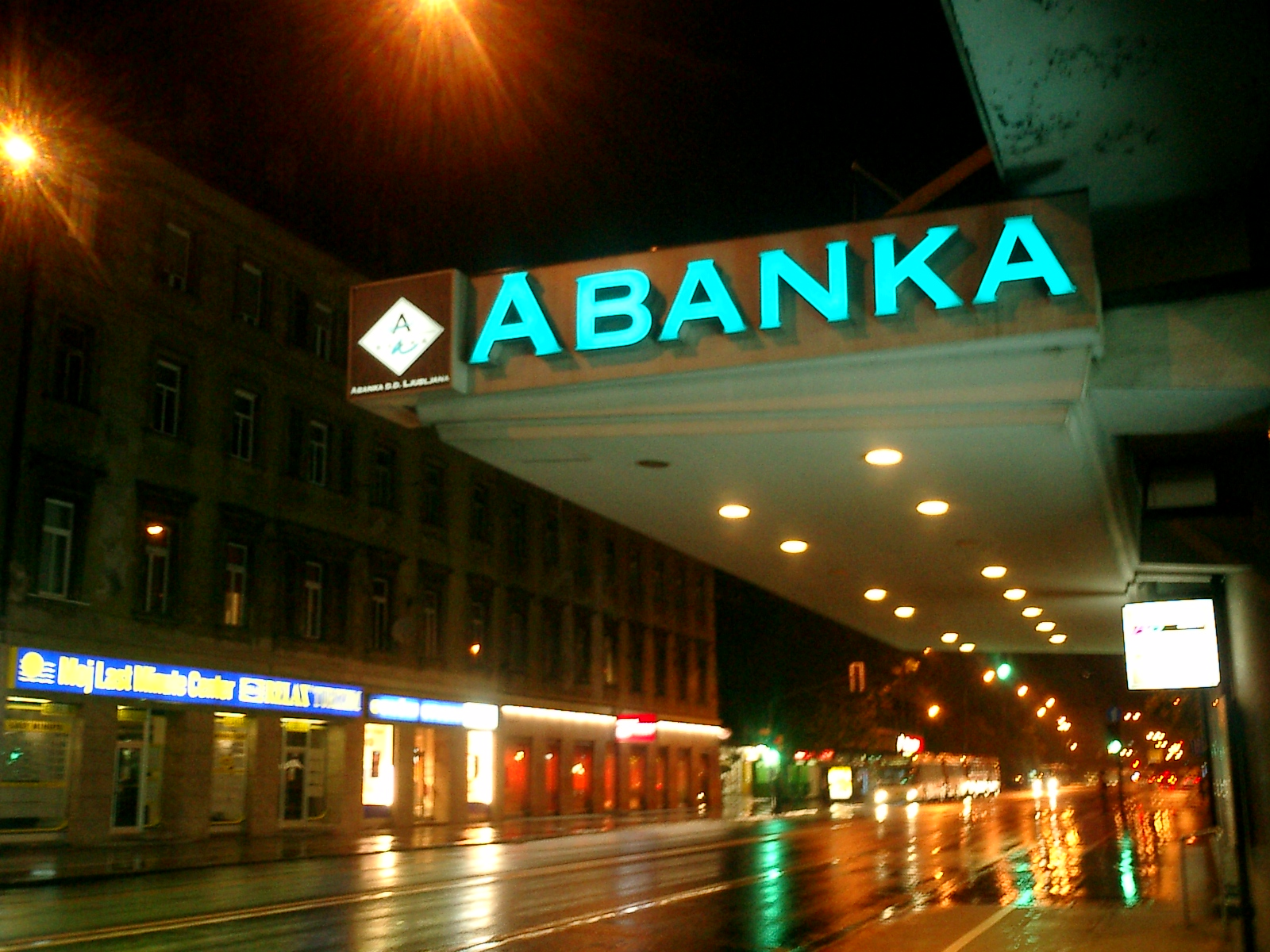
Abanka logo in Ljubljana, photographed in 2006

Abanka was a bank based in Ljubljana, Slovenia.

== Overview ==
Abanka's origin go back to 1955, when the Yugoslav Bank for Foreign Trade established a branch in Ljubljana. In 1990 in the runup to the independence of Slovenia, it became an independent entity and rebranded itself as Abanka.

In December 2015, Abanka absorbed Banka Celje, a local bank located in Celje. In March 2018 it sold its leasing arm to Banka Sparkasse, the Slovenian affiliate of Erste Group.

In June 2019, Nova Kreditna Banka Maribor (NKBM) announced the acquisition of Abanka, by then the third-largest Slovenian bank; that transaction was completed on 1 September 2020. NKBM was in turn purchased in 2021 by Budapest-based OTP Group, and on 22 August 2024 OTP integrated all its Slovenian operations under its own brand. By then, OTP had a share of around 30 percent of the Slovenian banking market.

== See also ==
- List of banks in Slovenia
