= Bank of Slovenia =

Central Bank of Slovenia

Coordinates: 46°3′10.44″N 14°30′12.59″E

Bank of Slovenia Banka Slovenije (in Slovene)

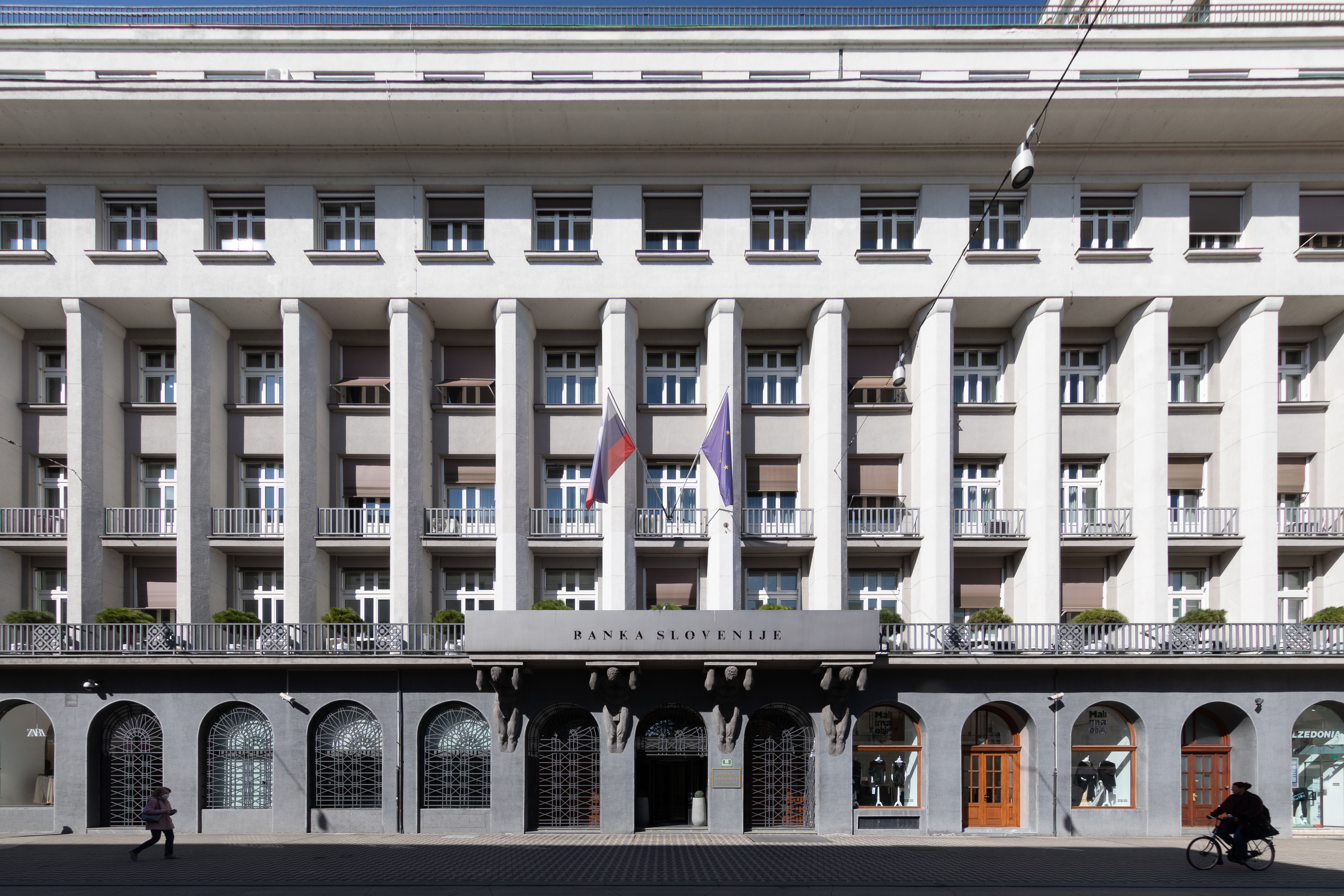
- Seat of the Bank of Slovenia in Ljubljana
- Central bank of: Slovenia
- Headquarters: Ljubljana
- Established: 25 June 1991
- Ownership: 100% state ownership
- President: Primož Dolenc
- Reserves: 350 million USD
- Succeeded by: European Central Bank (2007)^{1}
- Website: www.bsi.si
- ^{1} The Bank of Slovenia still exists but many functions have been taken over by the ECB.

The Bank of Slovenia (Slovene: Banka Slovenije) is the national central bank for Slovenia within the Eurosystem. It was the Slovenian central bank from 1991 to 2006, issuing the tolar. In 1991 it had succeeded the National Bank of Slovenia, established in 1971 within the federal monetary system centered on the National Bank of Yugoslavia.

In addition to its monetary role, the Bank of Slovenia is also a financial supervisory authority. In that capacity, it increasingly implements policies set at the European Union level. It is the national competent authority for Slovenia within European Banking Supervision. It is a voting member of the Board of Supervisors of the European Banking Authority (EBA). It is Slovenia's designated National Resolution Authority and plenary session member of the Single Resolution Board (SRB). It is also a member of the European Systemic Risk Board (ESRB).

== Overview ==
The National Bank of Slovenia was originally established in 1971 as part of the System of National Banks which replaced the National Bank of Yugoslavia (NBJ) as Yugoslavia's collective monetary authority. The legal framework was finalized under Slovenian law in 1973-1976 within the Yugoslav federal system.

In early 1991, during the early phase of the breakup of Yugoslavia, the National Bank of Slovenia started preparations to introduce a separate currency to replace the dinar, following revelations of capture of the NBJ by Serbian politicians. Slovenian legislation reorganizing and renaming the National Bank as the Bank of Slovenia entered into force on 25 June 1991, the same day as Slovenia's declaration of independence which triggered the Ten-Day War. The Slovenian tolar was subsequently introduced as national currency on 7 October 1991.

The Bank of Slovenia is a non-governmental independent institution, obliged to periodically present a report on its operation to the National Assembly of Slovenia. Its primary task is to take care of the stability of the domestic currency and to ensure the liquidity of payments within the country and with foreign countries. It also acts as the supervisor of the banking system.

The bank is headquartered in a prominent building in the center of Ljubljana, erected in 1920-1923 for the Ljubljana Credit Bank.

=== 2011 Banking Crisis ===
Unlike the Baltic states of Eastern Europe, Slovenia maintained very strong state control over its banks after joining the European Union. This created an ecosystem of cross-lending between public banks and government-linked companies. When the 2008 global financial crisis finally hit Slovenia's economy, the system collapsed. The Slovenian state had to inject more than €3 billion into its own banks to prevent technical bankruptcy in 2013. Many public banks were privatized in the aftermath of the crisis.

On March 22, 2018, Boštjan Jazbec announced his resignation as governor of the Bank of Slovenia, citing threats against his life. This followed his refusal to support the political authorities' decision to bail out the bankers during the 2011 crisis through the central bank.

In October 2019, Boštjan Vasle clashed with parliament when a law was passed requiring the central bank to compensate bondholders of banks bailed out in December 2013.

== Governors ==
- France Arhar (1991–2001)
- Mitja Gaspari (2001–2007)
- Marko Kranjec (2007–2013)
- Boštjan Jazbec (2013–2018)
- Boštjan Vasle (2019-2025)
- Primož Dolenc (2025–present)

In January 2025, Boštjan Vasle’s six-year term expired. Since then, Vice-Governor Primož Dolenc has been serving as Acting Governor, though without voting rights in the Governing Council of the European Central Bank.

In May 2025, Slovenian President Nataša Pirc Mušar proposed Simon Savšek, head of the European Investment Bank’s office in Slovenia, as the next Governor, pending parliamentary approval.

In January 2026, Pirc Mušar nominated the acting governor of the Bank of Slovenia, Primož Dolenc, as governor for a 6 year term. On 3 February 2026, the Slovenian Parliament approved Dolenc's nomination.

== See also ==
- Economy of Slovenia
- List of central banks
- List of financial supervisory authorities by country
- List of banks in Slovenia
