= Ljubljana Credit Bank =

Former bank in Ljubljana

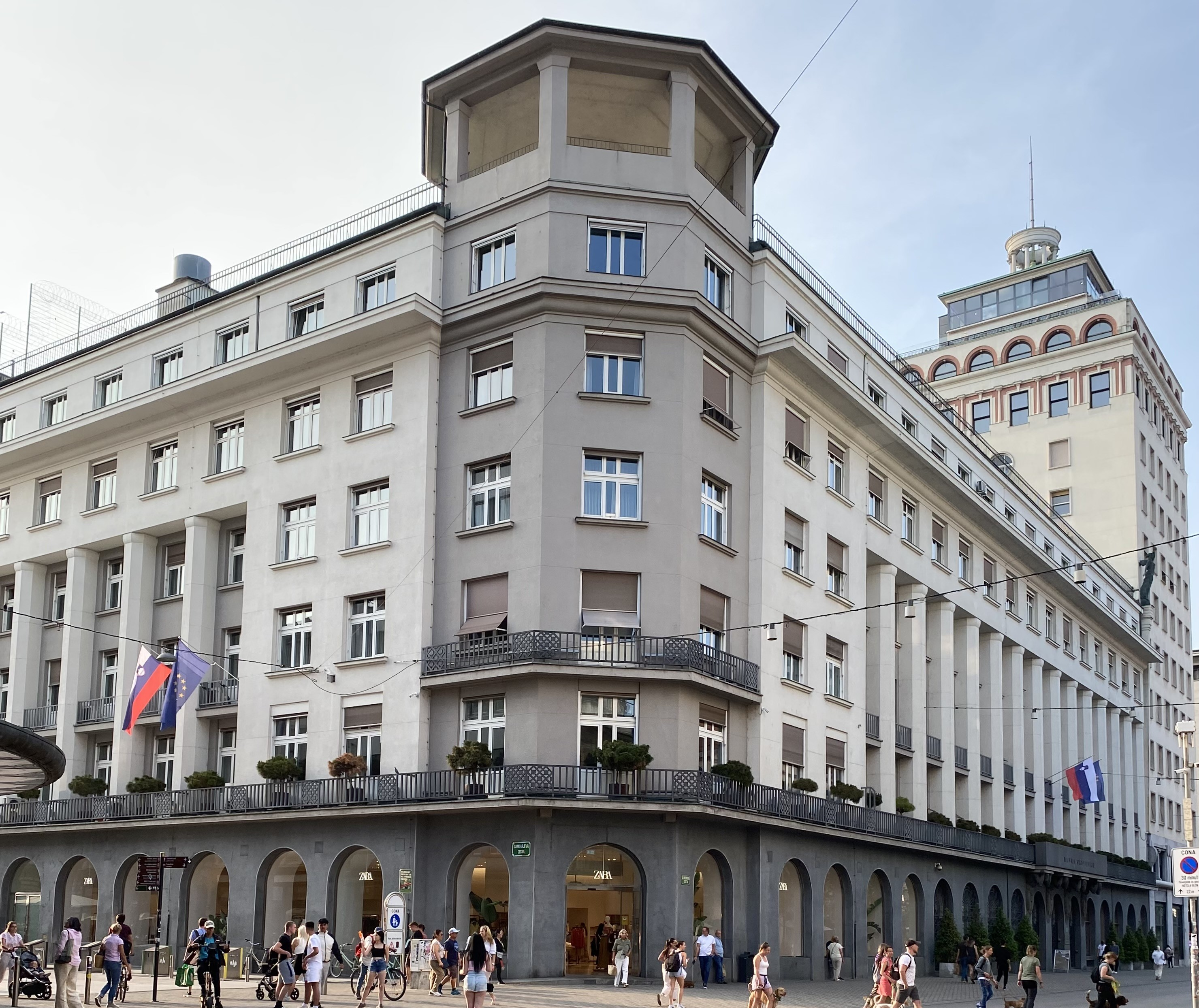
- LKB head office building, since 1991 the seat of the Bank of Slovenia (N.B. the Nebotičnik high-rise on the right is a separate building)
- Native name: Ljubljanska kreditna banka
- Company type: Joint-stock company
- Industry: Banking
- Founded: 1900; 126 years ago
- Defunct: 1945
- Fate: Liquidated at the end of World War II together with the entire banking sector of Yugoslavia
- Headquarters: Ljubljana, Slovenia
- Products: Banking services
- Parent: Živnostenská Banka

The Ljubljana Credit Bank (Slovene: Ljubljanska kreditna banka, LKB) was a significant joint-stock bank headquartered in Ljubljana, created in 1900 by Prague-based Živnostenská Banka as a local affiliate and eventually liquidated in 1945.

== History ==
The bank was established in 1900 by Živnostenská Banka on the advice of Ljubljana's Czech-friendly mayor Ivan Hribar, in line with Živnostenská's strategy of expansion into the Slavic-speaking parts of the Habsburg monarchy. By the founding assembly held on 24 August 1900 on the bank's original premises on Špitalska street, Hribar was elected president and Josip Spitalsky, then head of Živnostenská's branch in Vienna, became vice president. Živnostenská Banka held half of the equity capital. The bank soon opened its first branch in Split.

LKB survived the turmoil of World War I and remained controlled by Živnostenská Banka. By 1924, it had foreign branches in Trieste and Gorizia, and domestic ones in Brežice, Celje, Črnomelj, Kranj, Maribor, Metković, Novi Sad, Ptuj, Sarajevo, and Split. On its core Slovenian market, it was briefly eclipsed by Slavenska Banka but regained a dominant position following that bank's bankruptcy in 1925, ahead of local rivals the Credit Institute for Commerce and Industry (Slovene: Kreditni zavod za trgovino in industrijo, the former local branch of Austria's Creditanstalt converted into a fully-fledged local bank in 1920) and the Cooperative Business Bank (Slovene: Zadružna gospodarska banka). In 1927, it merged with Trgovska banka, thus forming the largest bank in Slovenia and the fourth-largest in all of Yugoslavia.

Like most other domestic commercial banks in Yugoslavia, LKB was heavily impacted by the European banking crisis of 1931 and had to adopt a voluntary program placing a moratorium on its liabilities in the spring of 1932, from which it partly emerged through a restructuring in 1935 in which only small depositors were repaid in full. By 1940, about a third of its liabilities were still "frozen" despite the prior conversion of a large amount of claims into preferred shares. It remained under moratorium throughout the war period.

LKB was eventually liquidated in December 1945, together with the entire banking sector of Yugoslavia. Operations that were not terminated were consolidated into the National Bank of Yugoslavia and State Investment Bank, itself merged into the National Bank in 1952.

== Head office building ==
In 1920, the bank started construction of a new head office building designed by Czech architect František Krásný with sculptures by Franc Berneker, prominently located on Slovenska Cesta (then named Tyrševa Cesta). The building was completed in 1923. It was taken over by the National Bank following LKB's liquidation. In 1991 it was the seat of the newly established Bank of Slovenia.

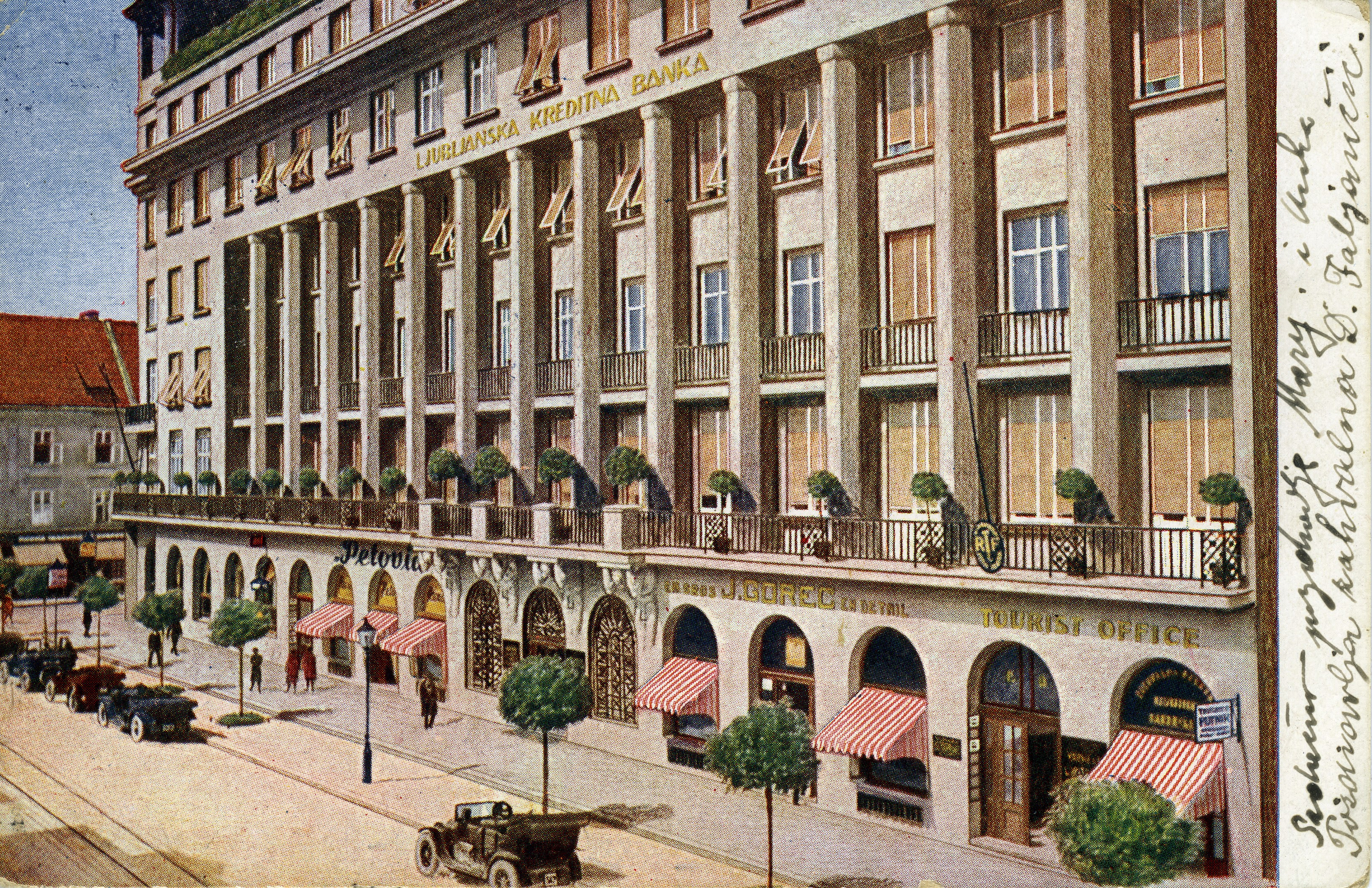
Main facade of the LKB building, 1928 postcard

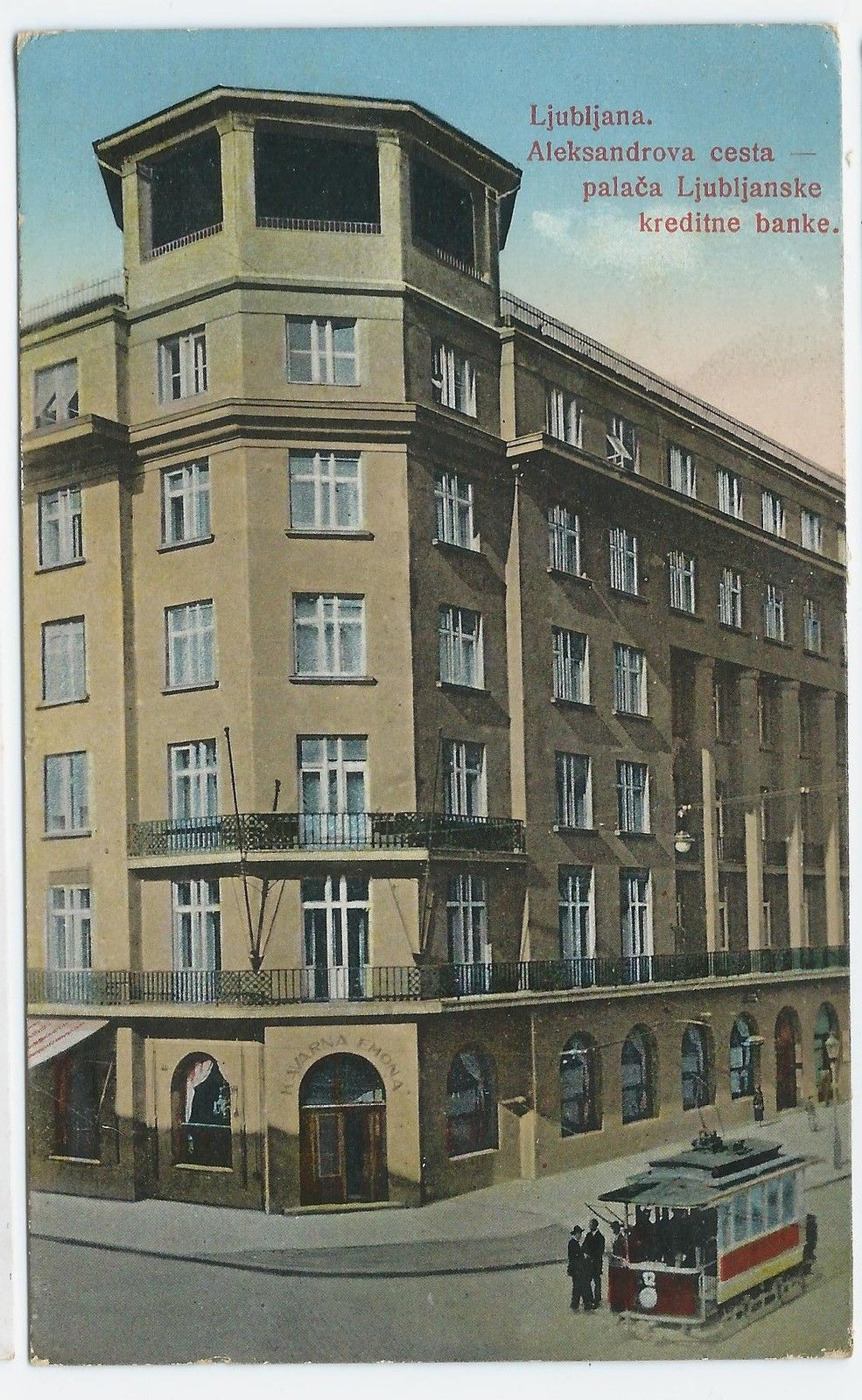
Angle of the LKB building, 1920s postcard

== See also ==
- Carniolan Savings Bank
- State Mortgage Bank of Yugoslavia
- List of banks in Slovenia
- List of banks in Yugoslavia
