= Victoria Group =

Serbian holding company

Coordinates: 44°49′01″N 20°25′37.8″E

ADM Nutrition Holding
- Company type: Joint-stock company
- Industry: Holding
- Founded: 8 November 2001
- Defunct: 12 December 2022; 3 years ago
- Headquarters: Bulevar Mihajla Pupina 115, Belgrade, Serbia
- Area served: Serbia
- Key people: Jake McCammack (Director); Emmanuel Ayuk (Director)
- Revenue: ▼€166.68 million (2020)
- Net income: ▼ (€0.91 million) (2020)
- Total assets: ▼€212.39 million (2020)
- Total equity: ▲€57.43 million (2020)
- Owner: Archer-Daniels-Midland Europe (100%) (as of December 2021)
- Number of employees: 997 (2020)
- Subsidiaries: Subsidiaries
- Website: www.victoriagroup.rs
- Footnotes / references Business ID: 17364723; Tax ID: 101898648

ADM Nutrition Holding, formerly known as Victoria Group (Serbian Cyrillic: Викторија Група), was a Serbian holding company with the headquarters in Belgrade, Serbia. It was a majority owner by Netherlands-based ADM Europe. The company had a total of 15 companies within its holding, which performs a variety of services, mainly agribusiness and wholesale.

== History ==
Former official logo of Victoria Group

ADM Nutrition Holding was founded on 8 November 2001 in Belgrade, FR Yugoslavia, under name Victoria Group, by Serbian businessmen Stanko Popović, Milija Babović and Zoran Mitrović.

Since 2015, ADM Nutrition Holding began accumulating debt, finishing 2015 and 2016 calendar year, with total net loss in range of 50 million euros. In November 2017, company's management confirmed media reports that it is seeking strategic partnership with investors due to capital loss over last years and over-indebtedness of the company.

In July 2018, it was announced that Serbian holding company MK Group has bought the majority of shares of then-indebted Victoria Group.

On November 22, 2021, MK Group, together with Milija Babović and Apsara limited, sold 100% of shares to ADM Europe for undisclosed amount.

== Market and financial data ==
ADM Nutrition Holding was ranked as the third net exporter company of Serbia and first in food-processing sector for the calendar year of 2015, mainly though its subsidiary companies Sojaprotein and Victoriaoil.

== Subsidiaries ==
This is a list of subsidiary companies of former Victoria Group (as of 27 January 2018):

- Victoria Logistic d.o.o.
- Victoriaoil a.d.
- Sojaprotein a.d.
- SP Laboratorija a.d.
- Fertil d.o.o.
- Luka Bačka Palanka d.o.o.
- Veterinarski zavod a.d. Subotica
- Victoria Phosphate d.o.o.
- Vobex Intersoja
- Victoria Food d.o.o.
- Activex d.o.o.
- Živinarstvo promet d.o.o.
- Victoria Starch d.o.o.
- Ribotex d.o.o.
- Agrofamily d.o.o.

== See also ==
- Agriculture in Serbia
