= Sojaprotein =

Serbian soybean processing company

Coordinates: 45°35′55″N 20°01′17″E

- Official logo
- Native name: Сојапротеин
- Company type: Joint-stock company
- Industry: Agribusiness
- Founded: 22 June 1977; 48 years ago
- Headquarters: Industrijska 1, Bečej, Serbia
- Area served: Worldwide
- Key people: Biljana Zlokolica (Director); Matthias Vogelsang (Director); Krystian Slaby (Director); Emmanuel Ayuk (Director)
- Products: Soy protein
- Revenue: ▼€179.57 million (2024)
- Net income: ▼€3.27 million (2024)
- Total assets: ▲€196.71 million (2024)
- Total equity: ▲€92.56 million (2024)
- Owner: ADM Europe (100%)
- Number of employees: 474 (2024)
- Website: www.sojaprotein.rs/en

Sojaprotein (full legal name: Sojaprotein a.d. za preradu soje Bečej) is a Serbian agribusiness company that produces soy-based products. It is headquartered in Bečej, Serbia. It is majority owned by ADM Europe. Sojaprotein processes exclusively non-GMO soybeans.

== History ==
Founded on 22 June 1977, Sojaprotein started regular production six years later, in 1983. The company was privatised in 2002, and became a subsidiary of Serbian Victoria Group. Since then, Sojaprotein increased the capacity of the production; total revenue increased from 54 million euros in 2002, to 133 million euros in 2012.

On 17 March 2004, it was admitted to the free market of the Belgrade Stock Exchange. On 31 October 2019, it was excluded from trading at the Belgrade Stock Exchange.

== See also ==
- Agriculture in Serbia
- List of companies of the Socialist Federal Republic of Yugoslavia
