= Hypo Alpe Adria Bank =

Austrian state-owned "bad bank"

Heta Asset Resolution
- Former Hypo Alpe-Adria-Bank logo
- Formerly: Hypo Alpe-Adria-Bank International
- Type: state-owned enterprise
- Industry: Financial services
- Founded: 1896; 2014 (spin off)
- Successor: Addiko Bank (Balkan branches); Austrian Anadi Bank (Austrian branches)
- Headquarters: 1 Alpen-Adria-Platz, Klagenfurt, Austria
- Services: former bank under resolution
- Net income: ▲€6.714 billion (2016)
- Total assets: ▼€10.788 billion (2016)
- Total equity: ▲€997 million (2016)
- Owner: Austria (100%)
- Subsidiaries: Alpe Adria Privatbank (in liquidation)
- Website: heta-asset-resolution.com

Heta Asset Resolution A.G. is a "bad bank" that was the residual asset of the original Hypo Alpe-Adria-Bank International A.G., which was dismantled in 2014. It was owned by the Government of Austria.

The bad bank contained the leasing subsidiary of former Hypo Alpe-Adria-Bank Group in Austria, Italy, Bulgaria, Serbia, Montenegro and North Macedonia but not in Bosnia and Herzegovina, Croatia and Slovenia, which were transferred to the "good bank".

In the past Hypo Alpe-Adria-Bank International was also active in Austria, Germany, Italy, Bulgaria, Hungary and Ukraine. However, due to the European debt crisis, the group was split into HBI-Bundesholding AG (consisting of the subsidiary Hypo Alpe-Adria-Bank S.p.A.; Italy), the Balkan banks (Hypo Group Alpe Adria AG; now Addiko Bank) and a bad bank, Heta Asset Resolution AG (ex-Hypo Alpe-Adria-Bank International AG) in 2014. The leasing subsidiaries of the former Hypo Alpe-Adria-Bank International in Italy, Bulgaria, Serbia, Montenegro and North Macedonia were retained in the bad bank. The Austrian branches were sold in 2013 (now Austrian Anadi Bank).

== History ==
=== Birth and rise of cross-border banking ===
The bank was founded in 1896 as Kärntner Landes- und Hypothekenbank (lit. 'Carinthian provincial and mortgage ban'). In the 1990s, it explosively expanded into the Alps-to-Adriatic region. In 2004 the company was renamed Hypo Alpe-Adria-Bank International A.G., as a holding company for the "Hypo Alpe-Adria-Bank" subsidiaries.

In May 2007 BayernLB, the Bavaria-state-owned bank, bought 50% plus one share (controlling stake) of Hypo Alpe-Adria-Bank International for €1.63 billion.

=== European debt crisis and the demerger of the group ===
On 14 December 2009, BayernLB, Kärntner Landesholding (Carinthia state holding) and Grazer Wechselseitige Versicherung sold their stakes in the bank to the Austrian government for €1 each. The bank was nationalised by the Austrian government to avert a bank collapse. It was expected that between €13 billion and €19 billion of outstanding loans will never be paid back; to avoid bankruptcy, the Austrian taxpayers will have to cover this loss.

The headquarters, which accounts for around 500 employees, was located in Klagenfurt, Austria and was responsible for controlling the subsidiary banks in Austria, Italy and South-Eastern Europe as well as those markets from which the bank was withdrawing (wind-down markets).

In 2013 the domestic branches of the bank in Austria were sold to Anadi Financial Holdings, and renamed to Austrian Anadi Bank.

As of February 2014, the Hypo Alpe-Adria-Bank International situation was unsolved, causing Chancellor Werner Faymann to warn that its failure would be comparable to the 1931 Creditanstalt event.

=== Under Resolution ===
In March 2014, the Austrian government decided to split Hypo Alpe-Adria-Bank International into a Balkans banking unit (Hypo Group Alpe Adria A.G.; formerly: Hypo SEE Holding A.G.), an Italian business (HBI-Bundesholding A.G.) and a bad bank, Heta Asset Resolution. The Balkans unit was sold in December 2014 to Advent International (80%) and the European Bank for Reconstruction and Development (20%).

The original company Hypo Alpe-Adria-Bank International was renamed as Heta Asset Resolution, becoming a "bad bank" that did not have a banking license. It was intended to wind down the bad bank over a period of years. The European Union had forbidden member states to provide state aid to make the market less competitive, thus the 2013 plan was redesigned in order to comply with EU law. The General Court also ruled that the guarantee granted by Austria to BayernLB in 2009 during the nationalization was a state aid but nevertheless compatible with EU law.

In October 2014 Italian Guardia di Finanza started an investigation on the leasing department of the Italian subsidiary. The department was remained in the "bad bank" as Heta Asset Resolution Italia S.r.l.

On 1 March 2015 the Financial Market Authority Austria (German: Finanzmarktaufsicht Österreich) imposed a moratorium on debt and interest payments by Heta Asset Resolution on unguaranteed debt. It was due to Austrian Federal Act on the Recovery and Resolution of Banks (BaSAG German: Bundesgesetz zur Sanierung und Abwicklung von Banken) came to effect, an Austrian transpose of EU Bank Recovery and Resolution Directive (BRRD). An audit also found that Heta had a capital shortfall of up to €7.6 billion. The Financial Market Authority would draw a new resolution plan for the bad bank in order to be in line with EU law. Financial Market Authority was the "national resolution authority" of this mechanism.

On 8 May 2015 The Munich I Regional Court obligated HETA to pay BayernLB €1.03 billion and CHF 1.29 billion plus interest. On 7 July 2015 Austria and Bavaria signed a memorandum of understanding which confirmed BayernLB was one of the non-subordinated, unsecured creditors for €2.4 billion. Austria would pay Bavaria €1.23 billion in advance for HETA. Despite it may be reimbursed due to ongoing court proceeding. Previously Austria, BayernLB and Bavaria sued each other for the responsibility of the debt, which BayernLB was a shareholder of the bank.

Dexia announced in February 2016 they would suffer another loss due to the moratorium.

In 2016 the state government of Carinthia, the provider of the state guarantee, offered a debt hair-cut to buy the senior bonds for 75% face value and 30% face value for subordinated bonds. On 4 August 2016, a private equity fund advised by Bain Capital purchased Heta Asset Resolution Italia S.r.l. (former Hypo Alpe-Adria Leasing S.r.l.) from Heta. During the year, Financial Market Authority also made a debt hair cut using the power as a resolution authority of EU Bank Recovery and Resolution Directive, making the bad bank had a positive equity for the first time.

== Buildings and sponsorship ==
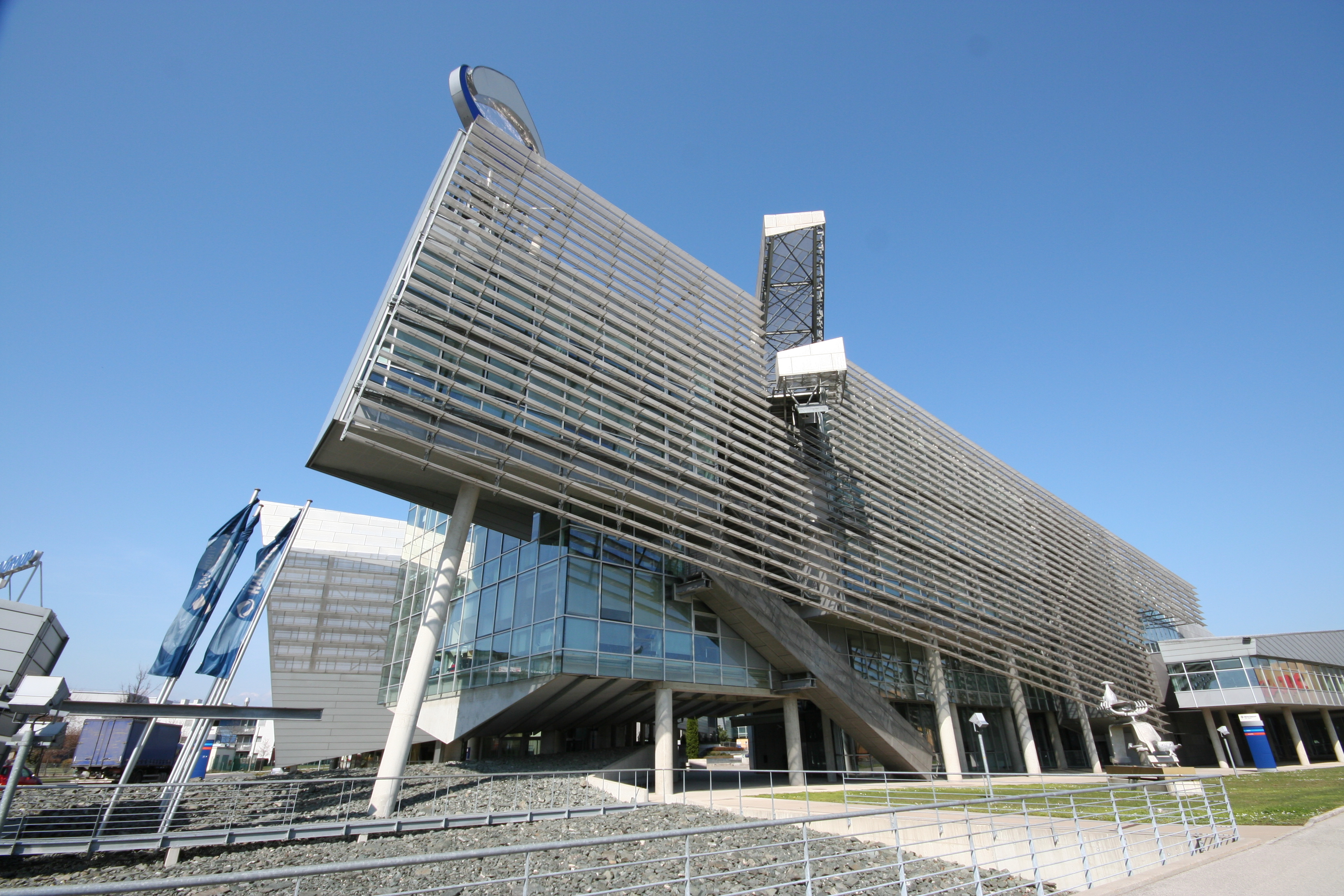
Former Hypo Alpe Adria headquarters in Klagenfurt, built in 2002 according to plans by Thom Mayne

The headquarters of Hypo Alpe Adria, designed by the American architect Thom Mayne, is located in the Carinthian state capital Klagenfurt am Wörthersee, Alpen-Adria-Platz. The building was sold to a Swiss real estate company at the end of November 2018; it was agreed not to disclose the purchase price.

In 2007 it was announced that the Wörthersee Stadion in Klagenfurt, Austria, would be called the Hypo Group Arena for at least ten years after the Hypo-Alpe-Adria-Bank secured the naming rights to the stadium. However, during the financial and economic crisis of 2009, the bank ran into financial problems and ultimately went under. Therefore, the stadium was renamed Wörthersee Stadion in 2010.

Between 2006 and 2008, they sponsored the Hypo Group Tennis International, a tennis tournament in Pörtschach, Austria.

== See also ==
- List of banks in Austria
