= NLB Group =

Bank in Slovenia

- Industry: Financial services
- Founded: 1994; 32 years ago
- Headquarters: Ljubljana, Slovenia
- Area served: South Eastern Europe
- Key people: Management Board of NLB d.d.: Blaž Brodnjak (CEO); Antonio Argir; Andreas Burkhardt; Archibald Kremser; Andrej Lasič; Reinhard Höll; Hedvika Usenik
- Products: Retail banking, commercial banking, investment, private banking, asset management, insurance
- Operating income: ▲€1,302.5 million (2025)
- Net income: ▲€503.1 million (2025)
- Total assets: ▲€32.270 billion (Q1 2026)
- Owner: Republic of Slovenia (25%)
- Number of employees: 8,322
- Website: www.nlbgroup.com

NLB Group is the largest banking and financial group in Slovenia, with the core of its activity being in Southeast Europe.

NLB has been designated as a Significant Institution since the entry into force of European Banking Supervision in late 2014, and as a consequence is directly supervised by the European Central Bank.

== History ==
Nova Ljubljanska banka was formed in 1994 from the restructuring of Ljubljanska banka, a Yugoslav bank originally formed in 1955 and nationalized by the newly independent government of Slovenia in 1991.

Banking members of NLB Group cover markets with a population of approximately 17.4 million people. In addition to NLB d.d., a main entity in Slovenia, NLB Group comprises several subsidiary banks in Southeast Europe: NLB Banka Skopje, NLB Banka Sarajevo, NLB Banka Banja Luka, NLB Banka Prishtina, NLB Banka Beograd, NLB Banka Podgorica, several companies for ancillary services (asset management, leasing, real estate management etc.) and a limited number of non-core subsidiaries controlled wind-down.

NLB d.d. is as of 14 November 2018 a publicly listed company owned by a diversified investor base and whose largest shareholder is the Republic of Slovenia with a 25% plus one share. With the acquisition of the Serbian Komercijalna banka in December 2020, the Group further strengthened its strategic and systemic position in the region. In April 2022, NLB's Serbian subsidiaries, Komercijalna Banka, Beograd and NLB Banka, Beograd, merged; with the new entity taking the name NLB Komercijalna banka a.d. Beograd; in September 2026 renamed to NLB Banka, Beograd.

In March 2022, the EU unit of Sberbank went into insolvency due to the EU sanctions in reaction to the 2022 Russian invasion of Ukraine and the Single Resolution Board decided to transfer all shares of the Sberbank's Slovenian subsidiary, later renamed to N Banka, to NLB. On 2 March, NLB officially bought the local unit of Sberbank, thus increasing its assets by approximately 1.0 billion euros. In September 2023 operational merger of N Banka to NLB was successfully completed.

In November 2023, NLB entered into an agreement to acquire a 100% shareholding in SLS HOLDCO, holdinška družba, the parent company of Summit Leasing Slovenija and its Croatian subsidiary, Mobil Leasing; with transaction successfully completed in September 2024. After the merger in the beginning of July 2025, NLB Lease&Go and Summit Leasing Slovenia are now serving clients as one company – NLB Lease&Go.

NLB Group concluded the financial year 2025 with a profit after tax result at EUR 503.1 million. In the third quarter of 2026, NLB Group delivered a net profit of EUR 159.6 million, leading to EUR 412.0 million net profit in the first nine months of 2026.

== See also ==
- Gorenjska Banka
- List of banks in the euro area
- List of banks in Slovenia
