= List of companies of Serbia =

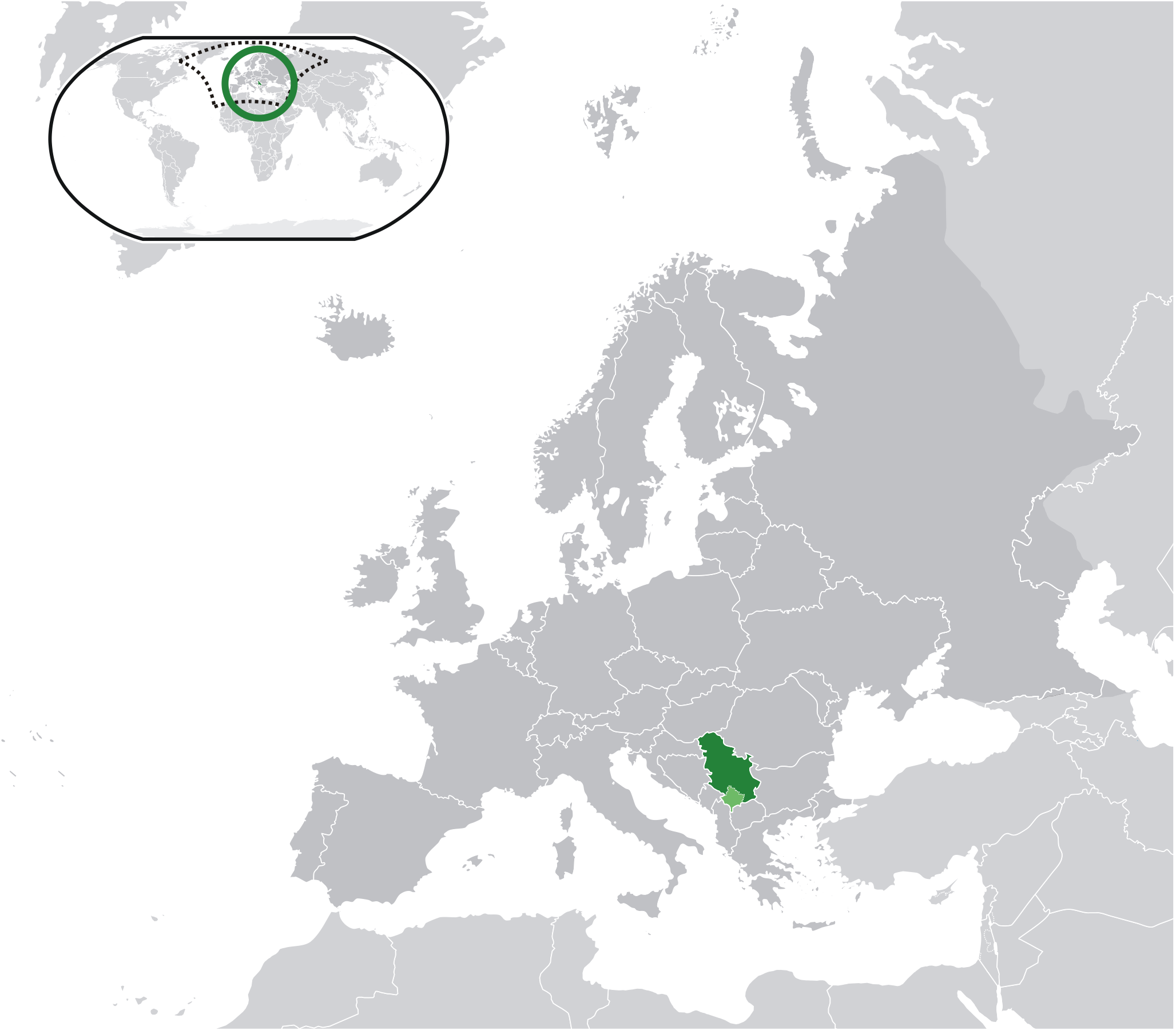
Location of Serbia

Serbia is a sovereign state situated at the crossroads between Central and Southeast Europe, covering the southern part of the Pannonian Plain and the central Balkans. Relative to its small territory, it is a diverse country distinguished by a transitional character, situated along cultural, geographic, climatic and other boundaries. Serbia is landlocked and borders Hungary to the north; Romania and Bulgaria to the east; North Macedonia and Albania to the south; and Croatia, Bosnia-Herzegovina, and Montenegro to the west.Thanks to its highways (Corridors 10 and 11) and river network (the total length of navigable rivers and channels is 1,395 km), especially Danube river which passes through the country and its capital city Belgrade, Serbia is connected with other important countries such as Turkey, Greece, Austria, Germany, Slovakia, Italy and many more. Serbia numbers around 7 million residents. and its capital, Belgrade. The capital city Belgrade, with its rich history, is one of the oldest cities in Europe and the largest city in the region with a population of over 1,600,000 people. Besides Belgrade, some of the other important cities are: Novi Sad, Niš, Kragujevac, Subotica, Šabac, Čačak, Kruševac, Kraljevo, Užice.

For further information on the types of business entities in this country and their abbreviations, see "Business entities in Serbia".

== Notable firms ==
This list includes notable companies with primary headquarters located in the country. The industry and sector follow the Industry Classification Benchmark taxonomy. Organizations which have ceased operations are included and noted as defunct.

Notable companies Status: P=Private, S=State; A=Active, D=Defunct
| Name | Industry | Sector | Headquarters | Founded | Notes | Status | |
|---|---|---|---|---|---|---|---|
| 14. oktobar | Industrials | Industrial machinery | Kruševac | 2016 | Heavy machinery | P | A |
| A1 Srbija | Telecommunications | Mobile telecommunications | Belgrade | 2007 | Part of Telekom Austria | P | A |
| AikBank | Financials | Banks | Belgrade | 1995 | Commercial bank | P | A |
| Air Serbia | Consumer services | Airlines | Belgrade | 1927 | Largest airline of Serbia | P | A |
| Apatin Brewery | Consumer goods | Brewers | Apatin | 1756 | Brewery | P | A |
| Aviogenex | Consumer services | Airlines | Belgrade | 1968 | Charter airline, defunct 2015 | P | D |
| Bambi | Consumer goods | Food products | Požarevac | 1967 | Biscuits, chocolates | P | A |
| Banca Intesa Beograd | Financials | Banks | Belgrade | 1991 | Bank | P | A |
| Belgrade Nikola Tesla Airport | Consumer services | Airlines | Belgrade | 1992 | Airport operations | P | A |
| Belgrade Stock Exchange | Financials | Investment Services | Belgrade | 1894 | Stock exchange | P | A |
| BIP | Consumer goods | Brewers | Belgrade | 1839 | Brewery | P | A |
| Carlsberg Srbija | Consumer goods | Brewers | Bačka Palanka | 1892 | Brewery, part of Carlsberg Group (Denmark) | P | A |
| C-market | Consumer services | Food retailers & wholesalers | Belgrade | 1971 | Supermarket chain | P | D |
| Color Press Group | Consumer services | Publishing | Novi Sad | 1992 | Publisher | P | A |
| ComTrade Group | Technology | Software | Belgrade | 1996 | Software, IT Solutions, Consulting | P | A |
| Crédit Agricole Srbija | Financials | Banks | Novi Sad | 1991 | Part of Crédit Agricole (France) | P | A |
| DDOR Novi Sad | Financials | Full line insurance | Novi Sad | 1945 | Insurance | P | A |
| Delta DMD | Consumer goods | Food products | Belgrade | 1997 | Part of Delta Holding | P | A |
| Delta Holding | Conglomerates | Holding | Belgrade | 1991 | Agribusiness, real-estate, retail and wholesale | P | A |
| Dijamant | Consumer goods | Food products | Zrenjanin | 1997 | Edible oil | P | A |
| Direktna Banka | Financials | Banks | Kragujevac | 1995 | Bank | P | A |
| Dunav osiguranje | Financials | Full line insurance | Belgrade | 1963 | Insurance | S | A |
| EI Niš | Industrials | Electronic equipment | Niš | 1948 | Electronics manufacturer | P | D |
| Elektrodistribucija Srbije | Utilities | Conventional electricity | Belgrade | 1991 | State-owned national electricity distribution | S | A |
| Elektromreža Srbije | Utilities | Conventional electricity | Belgrade | 2005 | State-owned national electricity transmission | S | A |
| Elektroprivreda Srbije | Utilities | Conventional electricity | Belgrade | 1991 | State-owned electrical utility | S | A |
| Elixir Group | Consumer goods | Farming & fishing | Novi Sad | 1990 | Agribusiness | P | A |
| Emotion Production | Consumer services | Broadcasting & entertainment | Belgrade | 2003 | Television | P | A |
| Endava Serbia | Technology | Software | Belgrade | 1992 | Formerly PS Tech & Comtrade Digital now Part of Endava Group | P | A |
| Energoprojekt holding | Industrials | Heavy construction | Belgrade | 1951 | Construction | P | A |
| EPS Elektrokosmet | Utilities | Conventional electricity | Pristina | 1989 | De jure operating, part of EPS | S | A |
| EPS Surface Mining Kosovo | Basic materials | Coal | Obilić, Kosovo | 1991 | De jure operating, part of EPS | S | A |
| EPS TPP Kosovo | Utilities | Conventional electricity | Obilić, Kosovo | 1991 | De jure operating, part of EPS | S | A |
| Erste Bank Novi Sad | Financials | Banks | Novi Sad | 1864 | Bank | P | A |
| Eurobank a.d. | Financials | Banks | Belgrade | 1997 | Part of Eurobank Ergasias (Greece) | P | A |
| Fabrika automobila Priboj | Consumer goods | Automobiles | Priboj | 1952 | Automotive | S | A |
| Fabrika reznog alata | Industrials | Industrial suppliers | Čačak | 1953 | Tools | S | A |
| FCA Srbija | Consumer goods | Automobiles | Kragujevac | 1953 | Part of Fiat Chrysler Automobiles (UK) | P | A |
| Flores | Consumer goods | Distillers & vintners | Kragujevac | 1985 | Alcoholic beverages | P | A |
| Forma Ideale | Consumer goods | Furnishings | Kragujevac | 1995 | Furnishing manufacturer | P | A |
| Frikom | Consumer goods | Food products | Belgrade | 1975 | Frozen goods | P | A |
| Futura plus | Consumer services | Retail | Belgrade | 2004 | Convenience stores, part of Moj Kiosk Group | P | A |
| G4S Secure Solutions d.o.o. | Industrials | Business support services | Belgrade | 1942 | Security | P | A |
| Galenika a.d. | Health care | Pharmaceuticals | Belgrade | 1945 | Pharma | P | A |
| Goša FOM | Industrials | Railway | Smederevska Palanka | 1999 | Rail vehicle manufacturer | P | A |
| GP Planum | Industrials | Heavy construction | Zemun | 1948 | Construction | S | A |
| GSP Belgrade | Consumer services | Travel & tourism | Belgrade | 1892 | Public transit | S | A |
| Halkbank | Financials | Banks | Belgrade | 1956 | Part of Halk Bankası (TUR) | P | A |
| Heineken Srbija | Consumer goods | Brewers | Zaječar | 2007 | Brewery, owned by Heineken International | P | A |
| Hemofarm a.d. | Health care | Pharmaceuticals | Vršac | 1960 | Pharma | P | A |
| Hesteel Serbia | Basic materials | Iron & steel | Belgrade | 1913 | Steel | P | A |
| HIP-Azotara | Chemicals | Mineral fertilizers | Pančevo | 1975 | | P | A |
| HIP-Petrohemija | Chemicals | Exploration & production | Pančevo | 1975 | | P | A |
| Ikarbus | Industrials | Commercial vehicles & trucks | Belgrade | 1923 | Bus manufacturing | P | A |
| Imlek a.d. | Consumer goods | Food products | Belgrade | 1953 | Milk and dairy | P | A |
| Impol Seval | Basic materials | Nonferrous metals | Užice | 1991 | Aluminum | P | A |
| Industrija mesa Matijević | Consumer goods | Food products | Novi Sad | 1994 | Meat | P | A |
| Jat Airways | Consumer services | Airlines | Belgrade | 1947 | Airline, defunct 2013 | P | D |
| Jaffa Crvenka | Consumer goods | Food products | Kula | 1975 | Biscuits, chocolates | P | A |
| Jat Airways AVIO taxi | Consumer services | Airlines | Belgrade | 2002 | Airline, defunct 2013 | P | D |
| Jat Tehnika | Industrials | Aerospace | Belgrade | 1927 | Aircraft maintenance and overhaul | P | A |
| Jubanka | Financials | Banks | Belgrade | 1991 | Owned by AIK Banka and later incorporated | P | D |
| JUBMES banka | Financials | Banks | Belgrade | 1979 | Commercial bank | P | A |
| Knjaz Miloš a.d. | Consumer goods | Soft drinks | Aranđelovac | 1811 | Mineral water | P | A |
| Komercijalna banka | Financials | Banks | Belgrade | 1970 | Bank | P | A |
| La Fantana | Consumer goods | Soft drinks | Belgrade | 2003 | Water | P | A |
| Lasta Beograd | Consumer services | Travel & tourism | Belgrade | 1947 | Public transportation | S | A |
| Lukoil Serbia | Oil & gas | Exploration & production | Belgrade | 1990 | Oil and gas | P | A |
| Marbo Product | Consumer goods | Food products | Belgrade | 1995 | Potato chips | P | A |
| Mašinska Industrija Niš | Industrials | Diversified industrials | Niš | 1884 | Railroads, energy, machinery | P | D |
| Maxi | Consumer services | Food retailers & wholesalers | Belgrade | 2000 | Supermarkets | P | A |
| Mercator Serbia | Consumer services | Food retailers & wholesalers | Novi Sad | 2002 | Supermarkets | P | A |
| Metalac a.d. | Consumer goods | Kitchen utensil | Gornji Milanovac | 1959 | Kitchen utensil manufacturing | P | A |
| Metals-banka | Financials | Banks | Novi Sad | 1990 | Commercial bank, defunct 2010 | P | D |
| Mihajlo Pupin Institute | Technology | Computer hardware | Belgrade | 1946 | Computers | S | A |
| Mikroelektronika | Technology | Computer hardware | Belgrade | 1997 | Hardware | P | A |
| Military Technical Institute Belgrade | Industrials | Defence | Belgrade | 1948 | Research & Development of military hardware | S | A |
| Milan Blagojević - Namenska | Industrials | Defence | Lučani | 1949 | Military chemicals | S | A |
| Millennium Team | Industrials | Heavy construction | Belgrade | 2003 | Construction | P | A |
| MK Group | Conglomerates | Holding | Belgrade | 1995 | Agribusiness, real-estate, banking and wholesale | P | A |
| Mlekara Subotica | Consumer goods | Food products | Subotica | 1955 | Dairy, part of Imlek a.d. | P | A |
| Moj Kiosk Group | Consumer services | Retail | Belgrade | 1976 | Convenience stores | P | A |
| Mostogradnja | Industrials | Heavy construction | Belgrade | 1997 | Construction | P | D |
| MPC Holding | Conglomerates | Real estate | Belgrade | 1991 | Real estate, logistics | P | A |
| MPP Jedinstvo | Industrials | Heavy construction | Užice | 1947 | Construction | P | A |
| Naftna Industrija Srbije | Oil & gas | Exploration & production | Novi Sad | 1959 | Oil and gas, owned by Gazprom Neft | P | A |
| National Bank of Serbia | Financials | Banks | Belgrade | 1884 | National Bank | S | A |
| Nectar d.o.o. | Consumer goods | Soft drinks | Bačka Palanka | 1998 | Beverages | P | A |
| Neobus | Industrials | Commercial vehicles & trucks | Novi Sad | 1952 | Bus manufacturing, defunct 2012 | P | D |
| Niš Constantine the Great Airport | Consumer services | Airlines | Niš | 1990 | Airport operations | S | A |
| Niš-Ekspres | Consumer services | Travel & tourism | Niš | 1951 | Public transportation | P | A |
| Nordeus | Technology | Software | Belgrade | 2010 | Game developer, Social Media | P | A |
| Novosti a.d. | Consumer services | Publishing | Belgrade | 1953 | Newspapers | P | A |
| OTP banka Srbija a.d. | Financials | Banks | Belgrade | 1977 | Part of OTP Bank (Hungary) | P | A |
| Pekabeta | Consumer services | Food retailers & wholesalers | Belgrade | 2002 | Supermarket, defunct 2012 | P | D |
| PEU Resavica | Basic materials | Coal | Resavica | 1992 | | S | A |
| Philip Morris Operations | Consumer goods | Tobacco | Niš | 1930 | | P | A |
| Pink International Company | Consumer services | Broadcasting & entertainment | Belgrade | 1998 | Broadcaster | P | A |
| Pivara MB | Consumer goods | Brewers | Novi Sad | 2003 | Brewery, defunct 2008 | P | D |
| PKB Corporation | Consumer goods | Farming & fishing | Belgrade | 1945 | Agribusiness | P | A |
| Politika a.d. | Consumer services | Broadcasting & entertainment | Belgrade | 1904 | Media | P | A |
| Pošta Srbije | Industrials | Delivery services | Belgrade | 1840 | Postal services | S | A |
| Poštanska štedionica | Financials | Banks | Belgrade | 1921 | Commercial bank | S | A |
| Prince Aviation | Consumer services | Airlines | Belgrade | 1990 | Charter airline | P | A |
| PPT-Namenska | Industrials | Defense | Trstenik | 1999 | | S | A |
| PPT-Petoletka | Industrials | Industrial machinery | Trstenik | 2016 | Hydraulics and pneumatics | P | A |
| Prvi Partizan | Industrials | Defense | Užice | 1928 | Ammunition | S | A |
| Putevi Srbije | Industrials | Heavy construction | Belgrade | 2006 | Construction | S | A |
| Putevi Užice | Industrials | Heavy construction | Užice | 1962 | Construction | P | A |
| P.S. Fashion | Consumer goods | Clothing & accessories | Čačak | 1996 | Clothing | P | A |
| Radio Television of Serbia | Consumer services | Broadcasting & entertainment | Belgrade | 1992 | Media | S | A |
| Radijus Vektor | Technology | Internet | Belgrade | 1998 | High speed internet | P | A |
| Raiffeisenbank Beograd | Financials | Banks | Belgrade | 2001 | Part of Raiffeisen Zentralbank (Austria) | P | A |
| Robne kuće Beograd | Consumer services | Broadline retailers | Belgrade | 1966 | Department stores | P | A |
| RT-RK | Technology | Software | Novi Sad | 1991 | Automotive Software and Consumer Electronics | P | A |
| RTV BK Telecom | Consumer services | Broadcasting & entertainment | Belgrade | 1994 | Defunct 2007 | P | D |
| Rubin | Consumer goods | Distillers & vintners | Kruševac | 1955 | Alcoholic beverages | P | A |
| Sberbank Srbija | Financials | Banks | Belgrade | 1991 | Part of Sberbank of Russia | P | A |
| Schneider Electric DMS | Technology | Software | Novi Sad | 2002 | Part of Schneider Electric | P | A |
| Securitas Services d.o.o. | Industrials | Business support services | Belgrade | 2003 | Security | P | A |
| Serbia Broadband | Telecommunications | Fixed-line telecommunications | Belgrade | 2000 | Cable TV and Internet | P | A |
| Serbian Railways | Industrials | Railroads | Belgrade | 1881 | Railway | S | A |
| Serbian Railways Infrastructure | Industrials | Railroads | Belgrade | 2015 | Railway | S | A |
| Severtrans | Consumer services | Travel & tourism | Sombor | 1947 | Public transportation | P | A |
| SIMPO | Consumer goods | Furnishings | Vranje | 1963 | Furnishing manufacturer | S | A |
| Sloboda Čačak | Industrials | Defense | Čačak | 1951 | Ammunition | S | A |
| SMATSA | Industrials | Transportation services | Belgrade | 2003 | Air traffic control | S | A |
| Sojaprotein | Consumer goods | Farming & fishing | Bečej | 1977 | Agribusiness; soy | P | A |
| Srbija Kargo | Industrials | Railroads | Belgrade | 2015 | Railway | S | A |
| Srbija Voz | Industrials | Railroads | Belgrade | 2015 | Railway | S | A |
| Srbijagas | Oil & gas | Exploration & production | Novi Sad | 2005 | Natural gas | S | A |
| Srbijašume | Basic materials | Forestry | Belgrade | 1991 | Forestry management | S | A |
| Štark | Consumer goods | Food products | Belgrade | 1922 | Food production | P | A |
| Swisslion Group | Consumer goods | Food products | Novi Sad | 1962 | Food | P | A |
| Tanjug | Consumer services | Broadcasting & entertainment | Belgrade | 1943 | Media | P | D |
| Tarkett | Consumer services | Furnishings | Bačka Palanka | 2002 | Flooring manufacturer | P | A |
| Telekom Srbija | Telecommunications | Fixed-line telecommunications | Belgrade | 1997 | Telecom | S | A |
| Telenor Serbia | Telecommunications | Mobile telecommunications | Belgrade | 1994 | Part of Telenor (Norway) | P | A |
| Tigar Tyres | Consumer goods | Automobiles & Parts | Pirot | 2002 | Tires | P | A |
| Trayal Corporation | Consumer goods | Automobiles & Parts | Kruševac | 1889 | Tires, explosives, protective wear | S | A |
| UniCredit Bank Serbia | Financials | Banks | Belgrade | 2001 | Bank | P | A |
| United International Airlines | Industrials | Delivery services | Belgrade | 2007 | Cargo airline, defunct 2008 | P | D |
| Univer-Export | Consumer services | Food retailers & wholesalers | Novi Sad | 1990 | Supermarket | P | A |
| Valjaonica bakra Sevojno | Basic materials | Nonferrous metals | Užice | 1950 | Copper | P | A |
| Valjevska Pivara | Consumer goods | Brewers | Valjevo | 1952 | Brewery | P | A |
| Victoria Group | Consumer goods | Farming & fishing | Belgrade | 2001 | Agribusiness, wholesale | P | A |
| Vojvođanska banka | Financials | Banks | Novi Sad | 1868 | Defunct commercial bank, merged into Vojvođanska banka a.d. | P | D |
| Vojvođanska banka a.d. | Financials | Banks | Novi Sad | 2019 | Part of OTP Bank (Hungary) | P | A |
| Yugoimport SDPR | Industrials | Defense | Belgrade | 1949 | Defense related equipment | S | A |
| Yura Corporation | Industrials | Electronic equipment | Rača | 2010 | Cable manufacturer | P | A |
| Zastava Arms | Industrials | Defense | Kragujevac | 1853 | Firearms | S | A |
| Zastava Trucks | Industrials | Commercial vehicles & trucks | Kragujevac | 1953 | Trucks | P | D |
| Zijin Bor Copper | Basic materials | Nonferrous metals | Bor | 1904 | Copper | P | A |

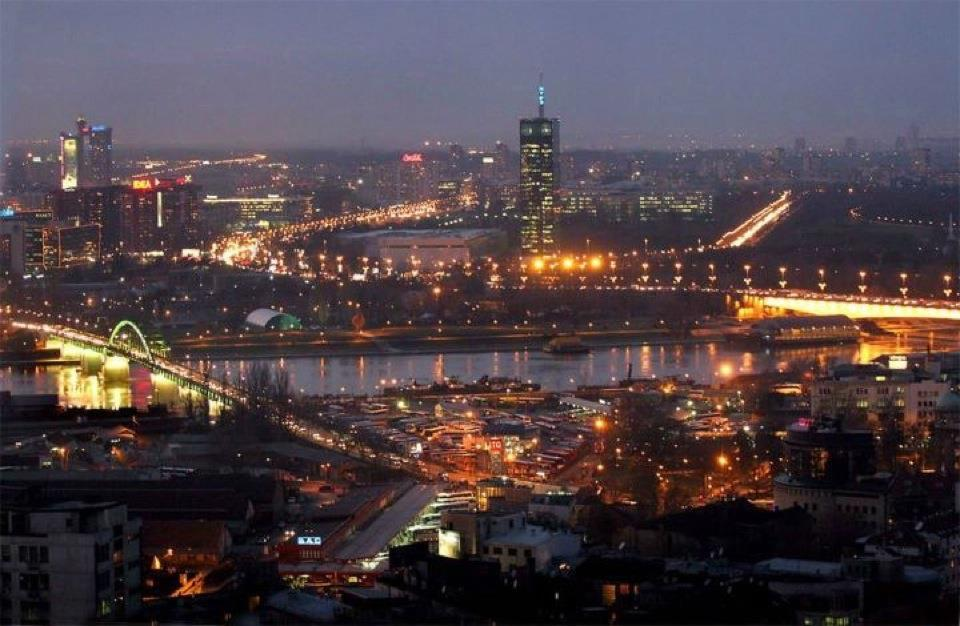
New Belgrade, main financial district in Serbia.

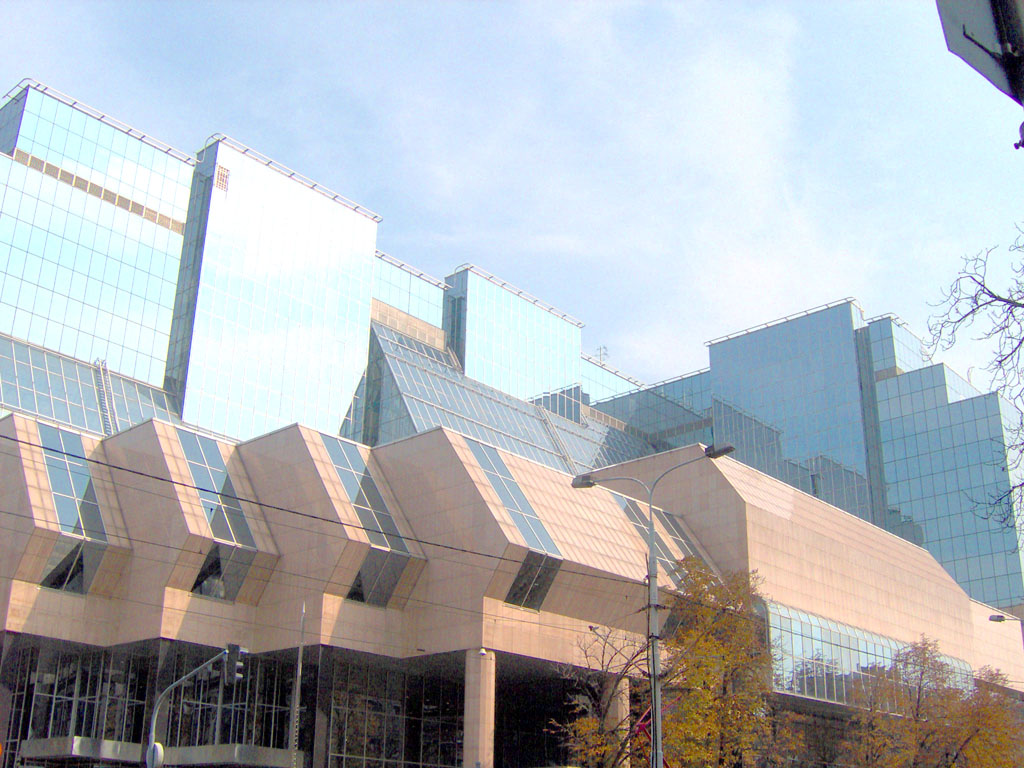
National Bank of Serbia.

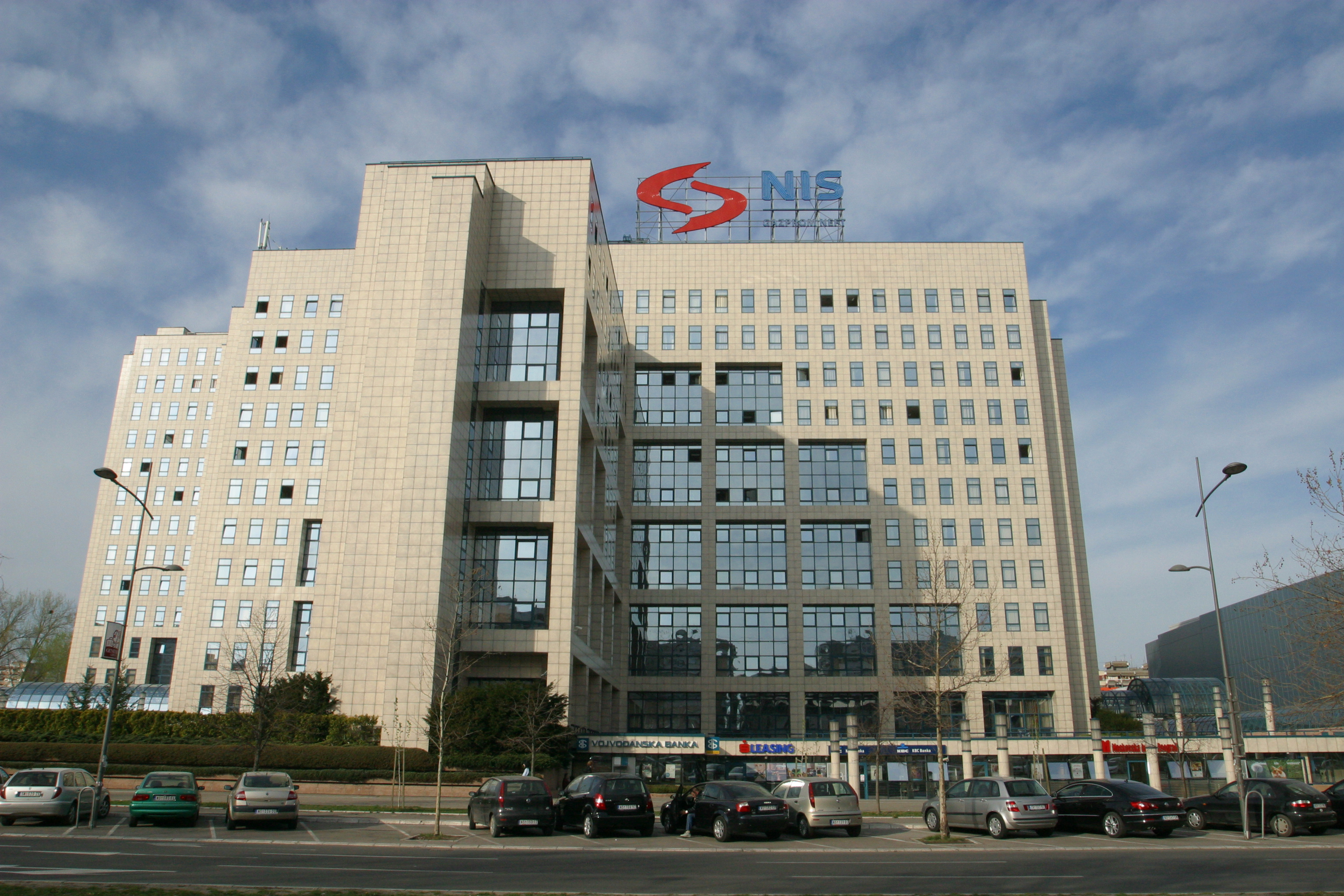
NIS headquarters in Novi Sad.

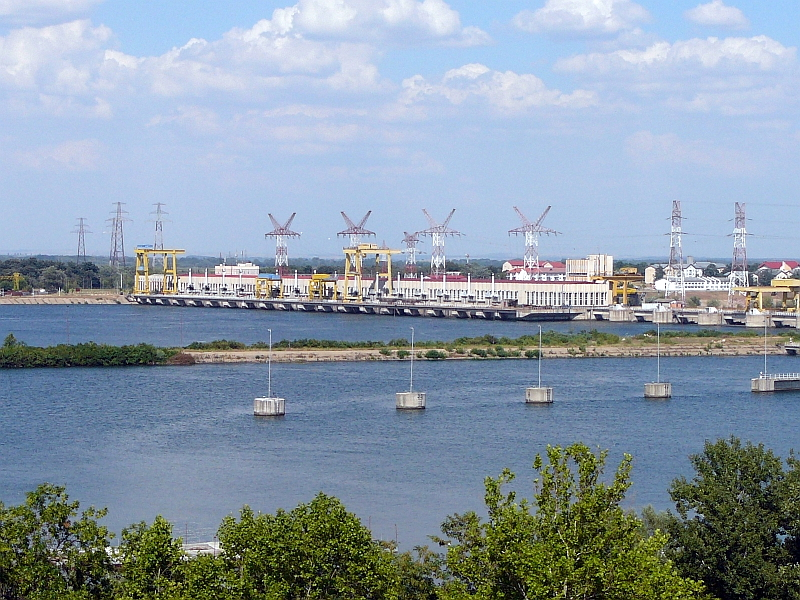
Iron Gate I power plant.

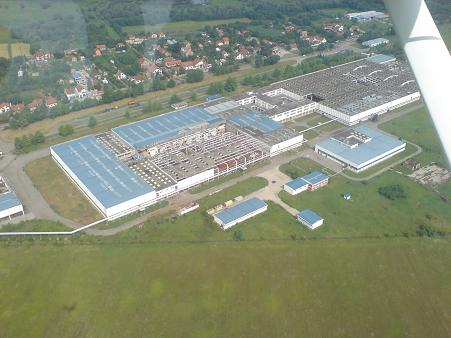
Utva Aviation Industry plant.

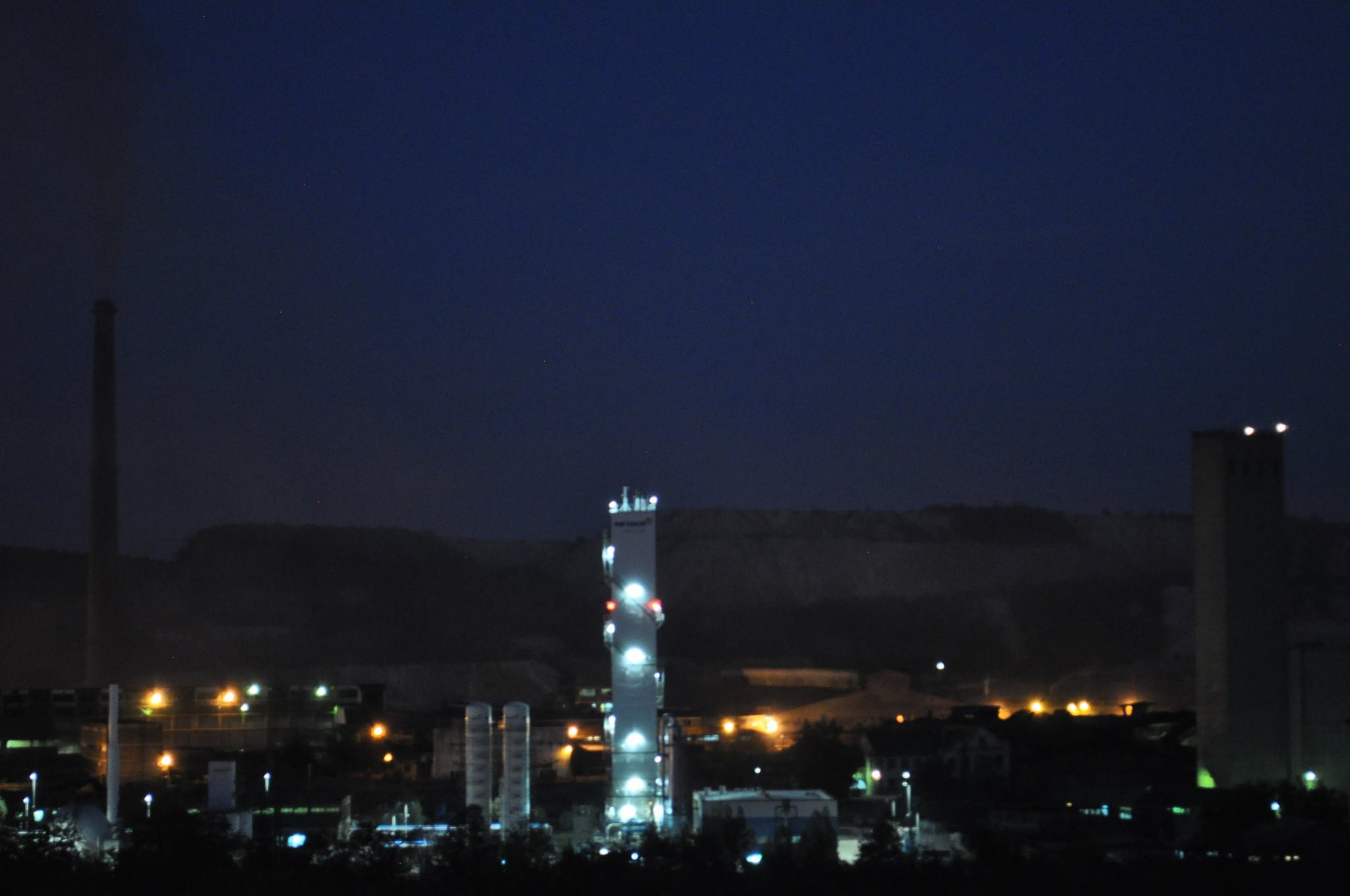
Messer Tehnogas "Cold box" in Bor, Serbia
