= Banking in Serbia =

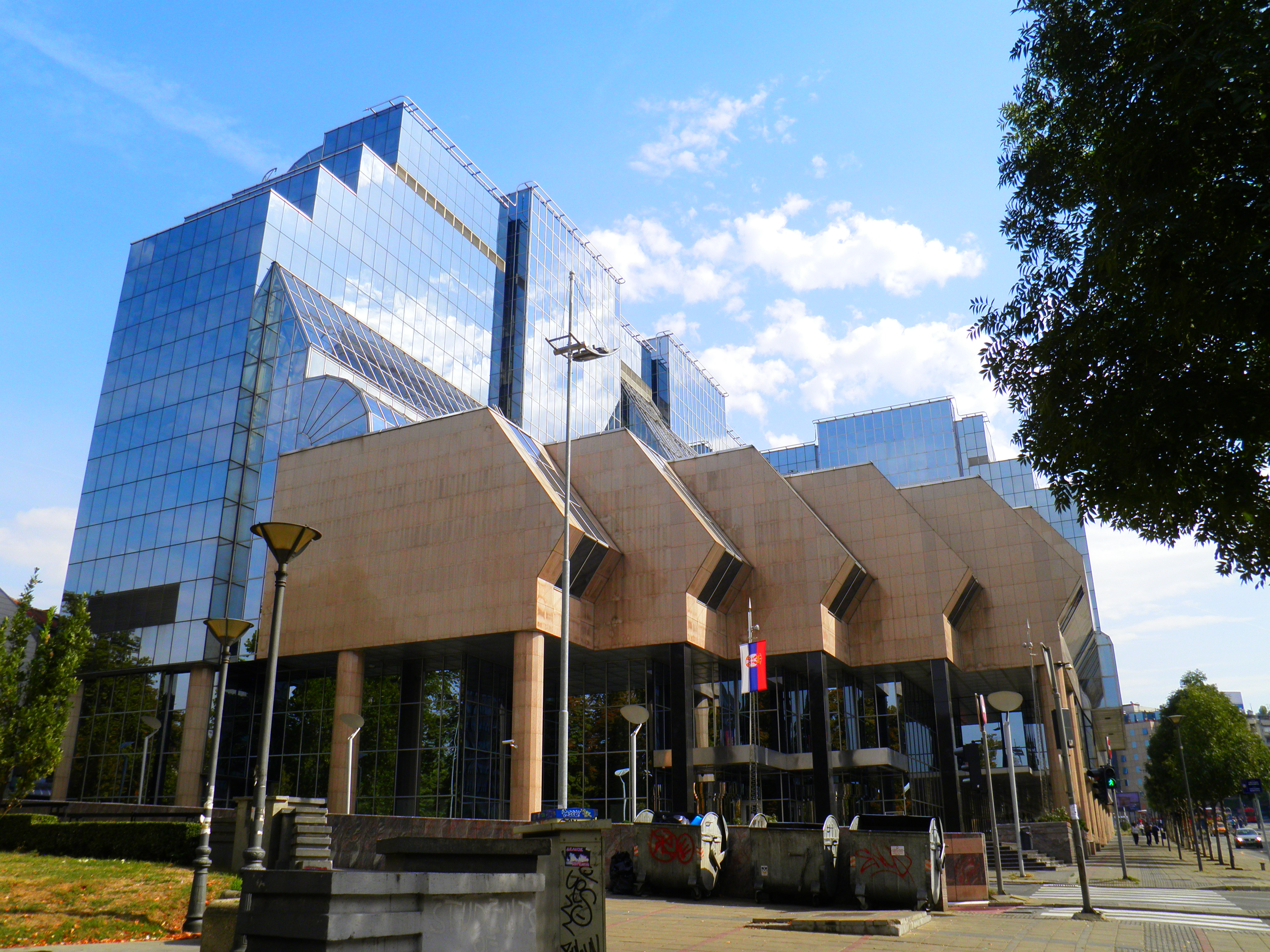
Headquarters of the National Bank of Serbia, Belgrade.

Banking in Serbia is regulated by the central bank in Serbia, the National Bank of Serbia. The mandate of the National Bank of Serbia is to contribute, without prejudice to its primary objective, to the maintenance and strengthening of the stability of the financial system and Economy of Serbia. To determine and implement measures and activities to that effect. Out of the total of 29 commercial banks, providing a wide array of banking services, 21 are in majority foreign ownership. Banks in Serbia are independent in their pursuit of profit-oriented business activities based on the principles of solvency, profitability, and liquidity. Every-day payment transactions are with a few exceptions, made in Serbian dinars, and one can use various types of credit cards (Visa, MasterCard, Diners, American Express). All major foreign currencies can be freely purchased and sold in exchange offices throughout the country. Many banks have automated teller machines, so, currency can be withdrawn at any time. Foreigners in Serbia, similar to the other countries, cannot get full service as in their home countries. While many banks have high ATM withdraw fees, few banks have lower fees.

== The profitability of the banking sector ==
The profitability of the banking sector went up by 58.8 percent by the end of June 2013 compared to the respective period in 2012 and the indicators of profitability continue to recover although they are still below the level of the pre-crisis period. According to the report on the situation in the banking sector in the second quarter of the year, which is released on the National Bank of Serbia's (NBS) website, Serbia's banking sector has recorded a net income of RSD 15.9 billion which is a 58.8 percent increase compared to the same period in 2012. The crucial reason for these changes is the fact that the Development Bank of Vojvodina was stripped off work permit and it operated with a loss of RSD 6.9 billion in the same period in 2012, the NBS said. Out of a total of 31 banks, 18 made profit totaling RSD 20.6 billion, while 13 banks operated with a loss of RSD 4.7 billion. The indicators of profitability continue the recovery trend, however they are still below the level of the pre-crisis period, the report reads. The indicators' recovery dynamics will mostly depend on the banks' business policy which at the moment aims at refraining from taking new loans and investing in the most liquid and the most safe forms of investments such as repurchase agreement securities of the NBS and Serbia's bonds. The greatest profit was made by the banks which belong to the group of big banks (with participation in the assets of over five percent of the banking sector), while the greatest losses were incurred by mid-sized banks (up to five percent). The list of banks with the greatest net profit comprises Banca Intesa (RSD 4,316 billion), Raiffeisen Bank (RSD 3,668 billion), UniCredit Bank Serbia (RSD 3,039 billion), Komercijalna banka (RSD 2, 583 billion), and Vojvodjanska banka (RSD 1,322 billion). The banks with the greatest net loss are NLB Bank (RSD -1,166 billion), Alpha Bank (RSD - 1,047 billion), Univerzal banka (RSD -554 million), OTP banka Srbija a.d. (RSD -531 million) and Piraeus Bank (RSD -431 million).

== See also ==
- Economy of Serbia
- Insurance in Serbia
- List of banks in Serbia
