= Matijevići =

Matijevići may refer to:

- Matijevići, Sisak-Moslavina County, a village near Dvor, Croatia
- Matijevići, Dubrovnik-Neretva County, a village near Kula Norinska
- Matijevići, Kladanj, a village near Kladanj

== See also ==
- Matijević (disambiguation), singular form
