= Stanko Subotić =

Serbian entrepreneur

- Станко Суботић
- Born: 9 September 1959 (age 67); Kalinovac, PR Serbia, Yugoslavia
- Occupations: Entrepreneur; Owner of Moj Kiosk Group, D Trade
- Spouse: Jagoda
- Children: 1
- Website: www.stanko-subotic.com

Signature
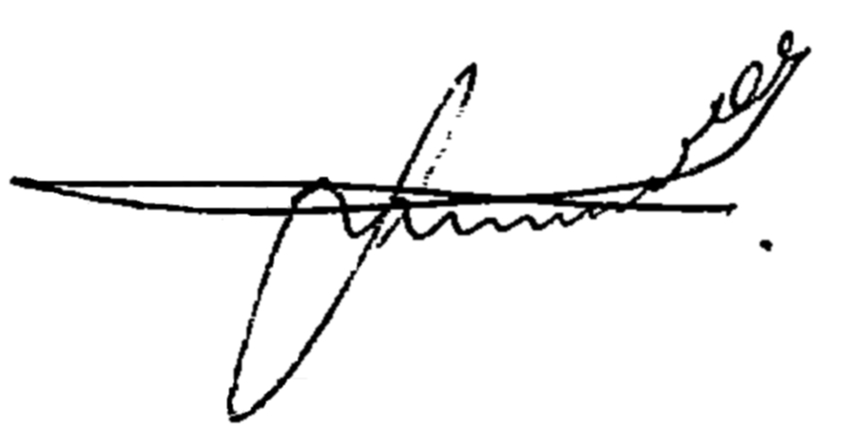

Stanko Subotić (Serbian Cyrillic: Станко Суботић; born 9 September 1959) is a Serbian businessman and the founder and owner of the Luxembourg-based holding company EMI Group (Emerging Marketing Investments APS) which owns Moj Kiosk Group and the French holding company Louis Max.

To the public, Subotić was known as a close friend of Prime Minister Zoran Đinđić and an active supporter of the democratic opposition in Serbia while Slobodan Milošević was still in power. For this, he had faced oppression by the Milošević regime and decided to leave Serbia in 1997. Later, he supported pro-European reforms steered by the Đinđić government.

In 2003, after the assassination of Zoran Đinđić, and during the rule of his political opponents Vojislav Koštunica and Boris Tadić, the government administration set in motion a politically motivated process against Subotić, indicting him for alleged abuse of office. In spite of a strong media campaign against him, he was acquitted of all charges at the end of 2015 by the Court of Appellation in Belgrade.

== Early life and education ==
Subotić comes from a working-class family in which he is the sixth and youngest child. As a teenager, he worked in his father's carpentry shop. He graduated from the High School of Economics in Ub, where he also met his future wife Jagoda.

== Business career ==
In 1979, Subotić left for France to work for a company owned by one of his friends. By 1981, he opened his first business - a chain of clothing boutiques that focused on wholesale.

During the mid-1980s, Subotić invested in Serbia and returned to Yugoslavia in 1989, during the reforms campaign led by Ante Marković. In 1991, he founded a company named MIA in Belgrade, which operated as a chain of boutiques and was supported by two ready-to-wear clothing factories.

In 1992, due to extraordinary economic circumstances in the country, Subotić accepted a contingent of cigarettes as payment for an apparel shipment. This led him into the cigarette trading business in 1995. At the time, Subotić owned two duty-free shops at a border crossing with North Macedonia and one at the sea port Bar in Montenegro. In 1996, Subotić became the exclusive distributor of British American Tobacco and Japan Tobacco for South-East Europe, expanding with distribution for SEITA and R. J. Reynolds Tobacco Company in 1997.

His cigarette trading business was initially based in Serbia, but after the murders of Radovan Stojičić and Vlada Kovačević in 1997, Subotić relocated his entire business to Montenegro, where he was close to the Prime Minister Milo Đukanović and the ruling DPS party president Svetozar Marović.

In July 1997, Milošević's regime shut down his duty-free shops and his company MIA. The government also attempted to illegally seize his private properties, which prompted Subotić to leave Serbia. He and his family settled in Geneva and became permanent residents in 1999.

Subotić continued to develop his business and in 2002, he founded EMI Group (Emerging Marketing Investments APS), a holding company with a head office in Copenhagen, Denmark. The company was focused on connecting successful distribution companies, other trade companies, and real estate companies across Europe. Later that year, EMI invested into a meat processing plant in Serbia. In 2003, EMI bought Duvanpromet, a company in Kragujevac which owned a large distribution network in Serbia, including many newspaper stands. Later that year, Subotić established another company called Futura plus.

In 2004, Subotić began collaborating with the German media holding group Wastdeutsche Allgemaine Zeitung (WAZ), the majority shareholder of Politika. This enabled Futura plus to embark on a significant expansion which resulted in this company becoming the largest distribution network in Serbia. In addition to his investments in Serbia, Subotić became the sole owner of the French company Louis Max in 2007.

Subotić also has large investments in Montenegro. He owns a part of the Sveti Nikola Island near Budva, and a luxury hotel on the Sveti Stefan peninsula.

== Media accusations ==
In May 2001, Croatia's Nacional Weekly published detailed accounts of Subotić's activities, claiming that in the late 1990s, he, Zoran Đinđić, and Milo Đukanović were involved in a cigarette-smuggling operation. Subotić rejected accusations and claimed they were complete fabrications orchestrated by a competing tobacco producer from Croatia, Tvornica duhana Rovinj which, supposedly, felt threatened by Subotić's plans to expand his business into Croatia.

In 2008, while Tadić was the President of Serbia, another negative media campaign against Subotić was organized, again focusing on cigarette-smuggling operations which had allegedly been coordinated by Jovica Stanišić and Mihalj Kertes. In 2009, after a full year of relentless pressure led by the government administration, his company Futura plus went bankrupt. Subotić claimed the attacks were orchestrated by tycoons Miroslav Mišković and Milan Beko who owed him more than €30 million from past business deals. Subotić's claims were later confirmed by the Anti-Corruption Council. The politically motivated attacks and impeded business operations drove WAZ to discontinue its operations in Serbia and sell all of their shares in Politika and Dnevnik.
