= Matijevic =

Matijevic or Matijević may refer to:

- Matijevic (surname)
- Matijevic Hill, on the planet Mars
- Jake Matijevic (rock), on the planet Mars
- Industrija mesa Matijević, Serbian agribusiness company

== See also ==
- Matijevići (disambiguation)
