= Alexander Picker =

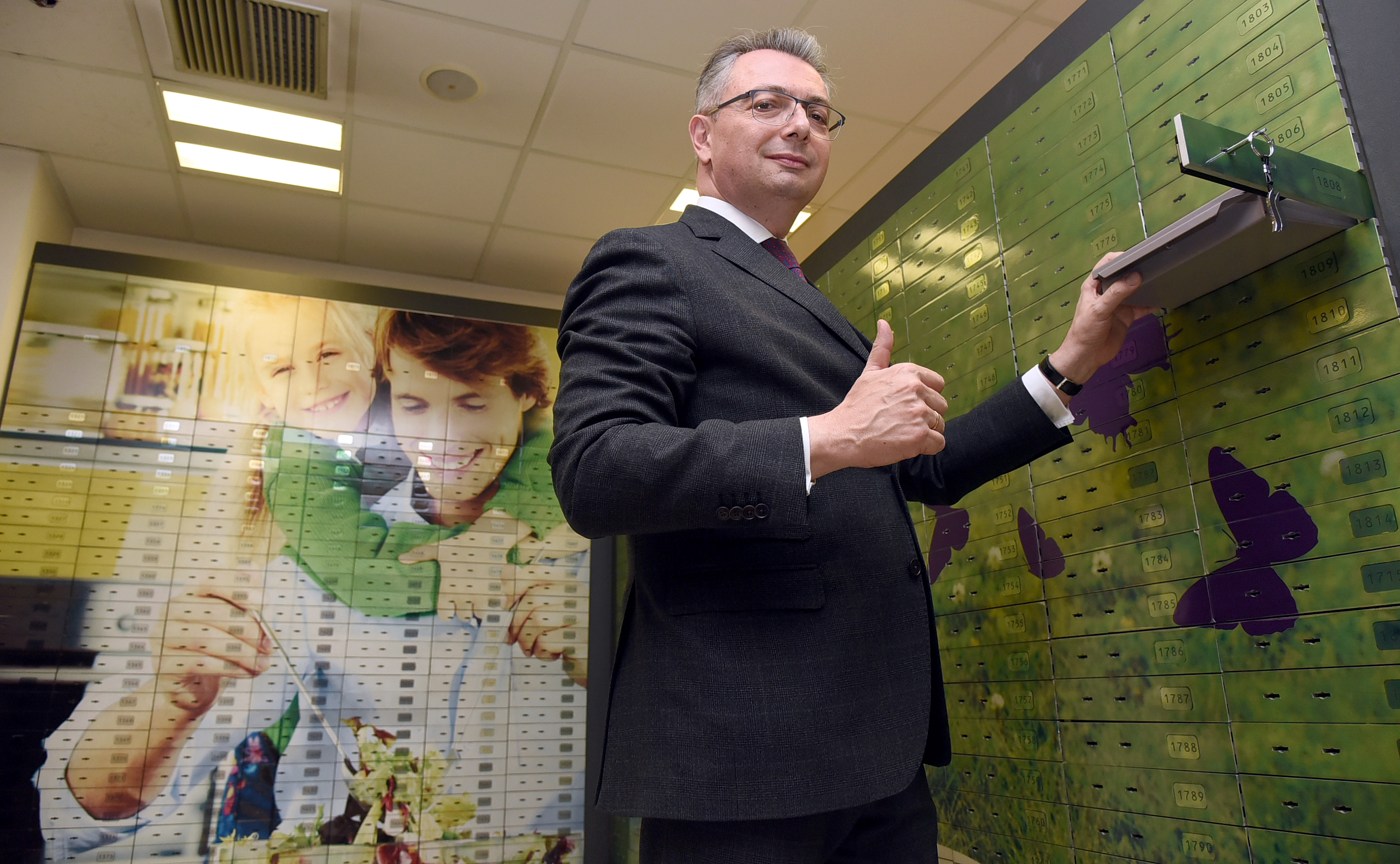
- Born: November 5, 1962 (age 63)
- Occupation: Manager
- Spouse: Dr. Monika Picker
- Website: www.kombank.com

Alexander Picker (born November 5, 1962, in Salzburg) is an International banker that is currently the CEO of Komercijalna banka AD Beograd.

== Biography ==
Alexander Picker is a multi-lingual Executive (10 languages, e.g. English, Russian, Serbian, Polish) with proven success in restructuring of banks in distress, planning, implementation and maintenance of business processes in the areas of Corporate and Treasury, Retail, Credit & Risk Management, IT and Operations. He specialized in crisis management and successfully managed legal and operational mergers. He is a frequent speaker at International conferences

Picker graduated at the University of Salzburg with two degrees (law and Slavonic philology) in 1987 and 1989 respectively. In 1989 he started his banking career with a trainee program in Österreichische Länderbank (today Bank Austria UniCredit). He continued from 1990 to 1992 at Girozentrale (today Erste Bank) as loan officer in Project Finance co-leading projects in Russia, Poland and Romania. During 1993 he was at Oesterreichische Kontrollbank. In 1994 he joined Creditanstalt Bankverein (today Bank Austria UniCredit) and was seconded to their Russian Consortium Bank “International Moscow Bank” (today UniCredit Russia), where he successfully weathered the Russian Crisis of 1998 as Chief Risk Officer on the Management Board. After 5 years in Russia he was seconded as Chief Operating Officer and later Chief Integration Officer to the Polish subsidiary PBK (later PBK-BPH, today Bank BPH). 2004 he was appointed CEO of the Serbian Subsidiary HVB Serbia & Montenegro (today UniCreditbank Serbia). From 2007 to 2010 he served as CEO of ATF Bank, Kazakhstan and Executive Vice President of UniCredit Group after the acquisition of the bank. From 2011 till 2015 he was CEO in the Hypo-Alpe-Adria International Group in Slovenia, Bosnia & Hercegovina and eventually of the whole Group in Austria. He joined Komercijalna Banka in December 2015. In November 2016 he took part at the "15th Belgrade Stock Exchange Conference UPGRADE IN BELGRADE 2016" In April 2017 he took part at the gathering „CEE M&A AND CORPORATE FINANCING FORUM 2017“.

== Personal life ==
Alexander Picker is married since 1987 with Dr. Monika Picker and has two daughters and one son.
