= RBA bank =

Serbian banking and financial services company

RBA banka Srbija AD Novi Sad
- Native name: РБА банка Србија АД Нови Сад
- Type: Subsidiary
- Industry: Finance
- Predecessor: Meridian Bank Crédit Agricole Group a.d. Novi Sad Crédit Agricole Srbija a.d. Novi Sad
- Founded: 20 September 2001 (Current form); 1991 (Founded)
- Defunct: 28 April 2023; 3 years ago
- Fate: Merged with Raiffeisen Bank
- Successor: Raiffeisen Bank
- Headquarters: Novi Sad, Serbia
- Number of locations: 74 branches 94 ATM
- Area served: Serbia
- Key people: Gianluca Giuseppe Borrelli (CEO)
- Products: Commercial banking
- Revenue: ▲€43.342 thousand (2019)
- Net income: ▲€9.601 thousand (2019)
- Total assets: ▲€1.09 million (2019)
- Total equity: ▲€105.273 thousand (2019)
- Owner: Raiffeisen Bank (100%)
- Number of employees: 945 (2019)

RBA bank (Serbian: РБА банка, romanized: RBA banka), formerly Crédit Agricole Srbija, was a commercial bank that existed from 1991 until 2023, when it merged into Raiffeisen Bank.

RBA bank was a bank with a focus on retail, corporate and agro activities. It offered a variety of services, with a network of 74 branches and 94 ATMs in Serbia. It served private individuals, small business and corporate customers (more than 300,000 clients). It was the first bank in car loan financing, second in agri-business financing, with a strong market position in housing loans in Serbia, and also recognized as a reliable savings bank.

== History ==
As of 14 September 2009, by the approval of the National Bank of Serbia, previous name of the bank was changed to Crédit Agricole Srbija. Initially the Bank was founded in October 1991 as a private bank called Yuco Bank with mixed capital. Since July 2005, it is majority owned by Crédit Agricole S.A. Paris, and operates under the name Meridian Bank Crédit Agricole until 2009 when it has been established under the current name.

On 5 August 2021, Raiffeisen Bank signed an agreement to acquire 100% of the shares of Crédit Agricole Srbija.

On 2 September 2022, Crédit Agricole Srbija became RBA bank as a part of the process of merging with Raiffeisen Bank. RBA bank merged by the end of Q2 2023. On 28 April 2023, ceased to exist after the process of merging was completed.

== See also ==
- List of banks in Serbia
