= Naša AIK Banka =

Serbian subsidiary of Russian Sberbank

- Native name: Наша АИК Банка
- Company type: Joint-stock company
- Industry: Finance and insurance
- Predecessor: Asna banka (1991-1997); Trust banka a.d. (1997-2003); Volksbank Beograd (2003–2012); Sberbank Srbija (2012–2022)
- Founded: 11 November 1991
- Defunct: 1 December 2022; 3 years ago
- Fate: Merged into AIK Banka
- Successor: AIK Banka
- Headquarters: Belgrade, Serbia
- Area served: Serbia
- Key people: Vladimir Bošković (CEO)
- Products: Commercial banking
- Revenue: ▼€32.50 million (2020)
- Net income: ▲€3.19 million (2020)
- Total assets: ▲€1.347 billion (2020)
- Total equity: ▲€216.62 million (2020)
- Number of employees: 722 (2020)
- Parent: AIK Banka

Naša AIK Banka (formerly Sberbank Srbija) was a Serbian bank based in Belgrade. The bank offered financial services to small and mid-sized businesses, entrepreneurs, and private individuals. It is now part of AIK Banka, following acquisition in 2022.

== History ==
The bank was established in 1991, under the name "Asna banka". On 26 June 1997, it changed its name to "Trust banka a.d.". On August 19, 2003, the Austrian Volksbank arrived at the Serbian market, by registering a subsidiary named "Volksbank Beograd". It had 92.96% of shares in the bank, along with 7.04% controlled by the European Bank for Reconstruction and Development (EBRD).

In 2012, Sberbank acquired 100 percent of Volksbank International, and eventually it became owner of Volksbank Serbia. The bank then changed its name to "Sberbank Srbija".

In November 2021, Serbian AIK Banka bought the majority of shares of Sberbank Srbija. On 2 March 2022, few days after it gained approval from National Bank of Serbia to integrate with AIK Banka, the bank changed its name to "Naša AIK Banka". Also, many banks in the region formerly owned by Sberbank changed ownership in days after the 2022 Russian invasion of Ukraine. On 1 December 2022, the bank finally merged into AIK Banka.

== See also ==
- List of banks in Serbia
