= Davor Macura =

- Давор Мацура
- Born: Rijeka, SR Croatia, SFR Yugoslavia
- Citizenship: Serbian; Croatian
- Occupation: Owner of Alta Banka
- Spouse: Maja Ilić

Davor Macura (Serbian Cyrillic: Давор Мацура) is a Serbian businessman who was the owner and chairman of the board of directors of Alta Banka. He is also the vice president of the executive board of the Olympic Committee of Serbia. He is closely affiliated with the Serbian Progressive Party (SNS) and has been described as one of the richest people in Serbia.

== Early and personal life ==
Macura was born in Rijeka, SR Croatia, SFR Yugoslavia and holds both Serbian and Croatian citizenship. He earned a doctorate (PhD) in management. He is married to Maja Ilić.

== Business career ==
Macura began his business career in 2008 by opening the "Alta" currency exchange office in Zemun. In 2014, he became the president of the Association of Exchange Offices in Serbia. In 2016, Alta Pay obtained a license to operate as a payment institution.

In May 2019, his exchange business acquired a state-owned shares of JUBMES Bank, becoming its largest shareholder. JUBMES Bank was subsequently rebranded as Alta Banka. In June 2023, the National Bank of Serbia granted the company an electronic money institution license, and by July 2023, Macura became the 100% owner of Alta Banka.

In September 2026, his company Alta Retail acquired the major retail chains IDEA, Mercator and Roda.

On 31 October 2026, the National Bank of Serbia officially revoked the operating license of Alta Banka. Following police raids and searches of the bank's premises, Macura was arrested on 2 November 2026. He is under investigation on suspicion of abusing his authority and unauthorized removal of approximately 45 billion Serbian dinars from the bank's vault with the assistance of bank employees.

Macura is widely reported by independent media to be close to the ruling Serbian Progressive Party (SNS).
