= Alta banka =

Serbian banking and financial services company

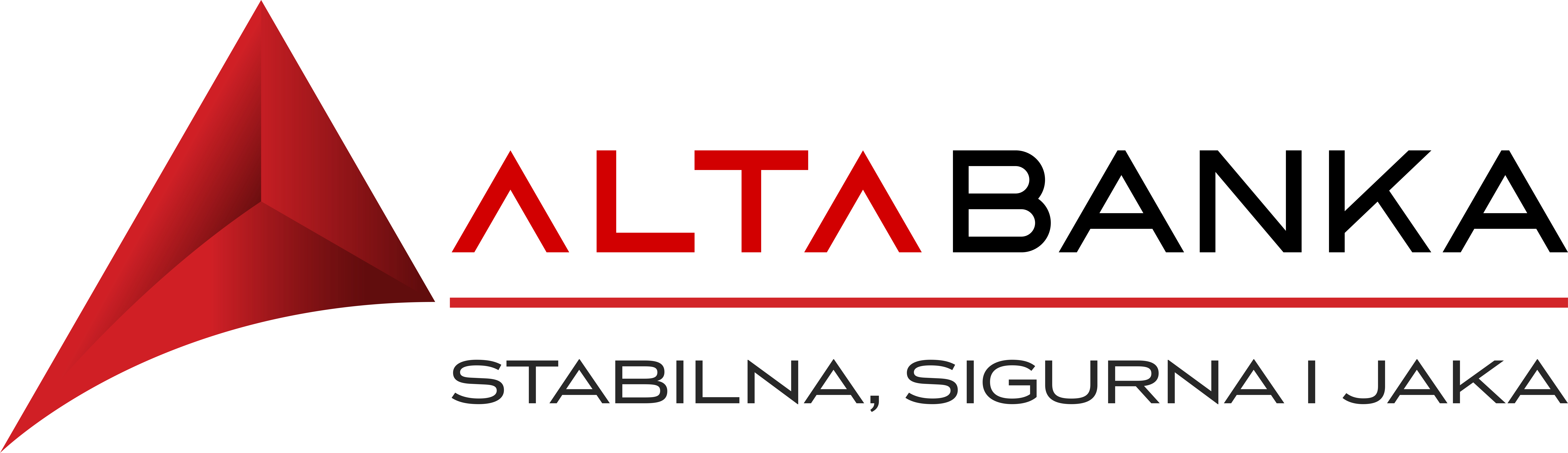

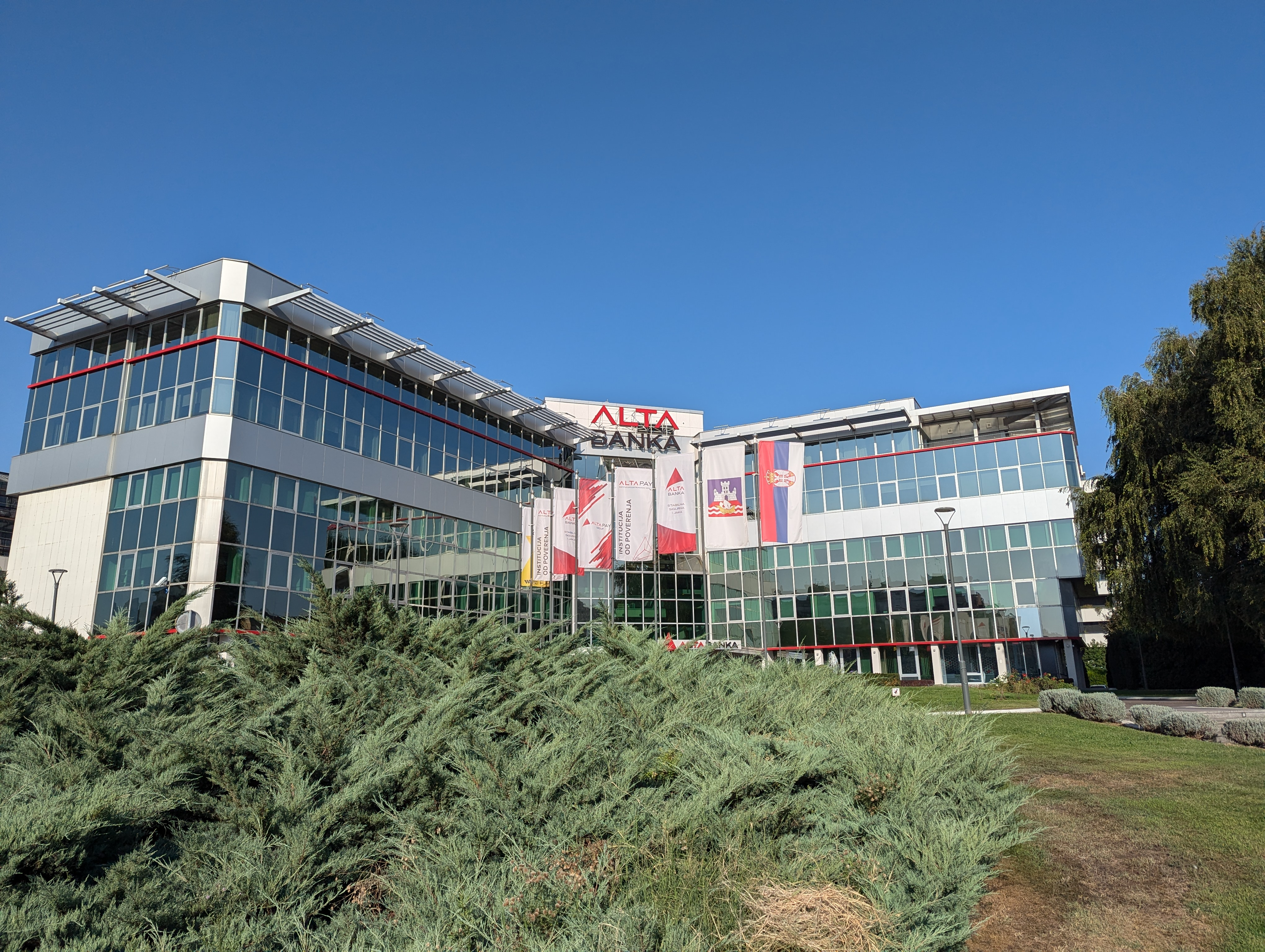
- Head office in Belgrade
- Native name: Алта банка а.д. Београд
- Romanized name: Alta banka a.d. Beograd
- Type: Joint-stock company
- Industry: Finance and Insurance
- Founded: 5 June 1998 (Final form); 1979 (Founded)
- Defunct: 30 October 2026; 17 days ago
- Fate: Bankruptcy; operating license revoked
- Headquarters: Zorana Đinđića 121, Belgrade
- Area served: Serbia; North Macedonia
- Key people: Una Sikimić (CEO)
- Services: Commercial banking, investment banking
- Revenue: ▲€57.48 million (2025)
- Net income: ▲€26.56 million (2025)
- Total assets: ▲€1.819 billion (2025)
- Total equity: ▲€203.52 million (2025)
- Owner: Alta Group d.o.o. (100%) (As of 30 October 2026)
- Number of employees: 775 (2025)
- Website: altabanka.rs

Alta banka a.d. Beograd (Serbian: Алта банка а.д. Београд) was a commercial bank in Serbia, that got its operating license revoked in October 2026.

== History ==
The bank was established in 1979 as the Yugoslav Bank for International Economic Cooperation (Serbo-Croatian: Jugoslovenska Banka za Međunarodnu Ekonomsku Saradnju, later abbreviated as JUBMES Banka), specializing in export financing. In 1997, it became a commercial bank, operating in then FR Yugoslavia and later Serbia.

In 2018, the Government of Serbia put its 28.5% stake in ownership structure on sale. In 2020, the bank changed its name to Alta banka, following the further change in ownership structure.

In July 2025, the state-owned Elektroprivreda Srbije (EPS) informed its users that the payment account will switch from treasury account to an account in Alta banka; the move was seen as controversial as the bank's owner Davor Macura is closely affiliated with at the time ruling Serbian Progressive Party. In October 2025, the bank purchased "Stopanska Banka a.d. Bitola", which later changed its name to "Alta Banka a.d. Bitola".

Starting with 27 October 2026, the bank's clients started withdrawing large sums from their accounts in cash and also by transferring them to accounts in other banks. On 30 October 2026, the National Bank of Serbia revoked the bank's license to operate due to illiquidity concerns, less than a week after the 2026 Serbian parliamentary election in which the ruling party lost the elections. The bank declared bankruptcy soon after. On 2 November 2026, Macura was arrested and is under investigation on suspicion of abusing his authority and unauthorized removal of approximately 45 billion Serbian dinars (or around $450 million) from the bank's vault with the assistance of bank employees over an unspecified time period. For comparison, the total nominal amount of Serbian dinars in circulation as cash at the end of August 2026 was 415 billion.

== See also ==
- List of banks in Serbia
- List of banks in Yugoslavia
