= La Fantana =

Companies based in Belgrade

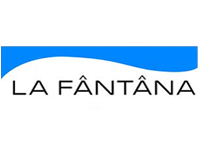
- Native name: La Fantana
- Company type: d.o.o.
- Industry: Beverage
- Founded: 25 December 2003; 22 years ago)
- Headquarters: Patrijarha Dimitrija 12, Belgrade, Serbia
- Area served: Serbia
- Key people: Igor Bosančić (Director)
- Products: Natural non-carbonated mineral water Water cooler Plumbed-in water coolers Roasted coffee beans Espresso machines
- Revenue: ▲€7.85 million (2018)
- Net income: ▼€0.86 million (2018)
- Total assets: ▲€6.45 million (2018)
- Total equity: ▼€3.81 million (2018)
- Owner: La Fantana s.r.l. (100%)
- Number of employees: 210 (2018)
- Website: www.lafantana.rs

La Fantana (Preduzeće za proizvodnju, trgovinu i usluge La Fantana d.o.o.) is a service company operating in the field of water bottling and distribution via water cooler devices. It is owned by the Romanian water bottling company La Fantana s.r.l., and is headquartered in Belgrade, Serbia.

La Fantana carries out water production and bottling in its own factory located in Mitrovo Polje, near Aleksandrovac. Natural non-carbonated mineral water is filled into polycarbonate return bottles of 11 and 19 liters. La Fantana is a member of Watercoolers Europe, a European trade organization for water coolers.

== History ==
La Fantana was founded by the Swedish investment fund Oresa Ventures on 25 December 2003. In November 2006, the factory for water bottling started operating. The factory is located in Mitrovo Polje within close vicinity of Aleksandrovac Innova Capital became the new majority owner of La Fantana in May 2007.

As of April 2016, it has more than 50% in water bottling market share in Serbia.

== Factory ==
La Fantana water factory is located in Mitrovo Polje. Mitrovo Polje belongs to the Kopaonik basin, and is located on the slopes of Željin Mountain, in the upper part of the river Rasina. La Fantana factory began operating in early November 2006. The total area of the factory complex is 8,064 square meters, while facilities occupy 1,991 square meters.

== Quality control and certificates ==
The sanitary permit for bottling facility of La Fantana natural non-carbonated mineral water was issued by the Sanitary Inspection of the Ministry of Health and Ecology on 12 September 2006, under the number 530-2560/2006-04. Certificate on quality and hygienic safety of La Fantana natural non-carbonated mineral water was issued by the Institute for Public Health in Kruševac, under the number M174/13, of 6 June 2013. La Fantana has the HACCP Certificate for the food safety systems, issued on 27 November 2014, number MS204514, by the certification firm MS Certification.
