= Aleksa Šantić (village) =

Aleksa Šantić Алекса Шантић (Serbian) Babapuszta (Hungarian)
- Village (Selo)
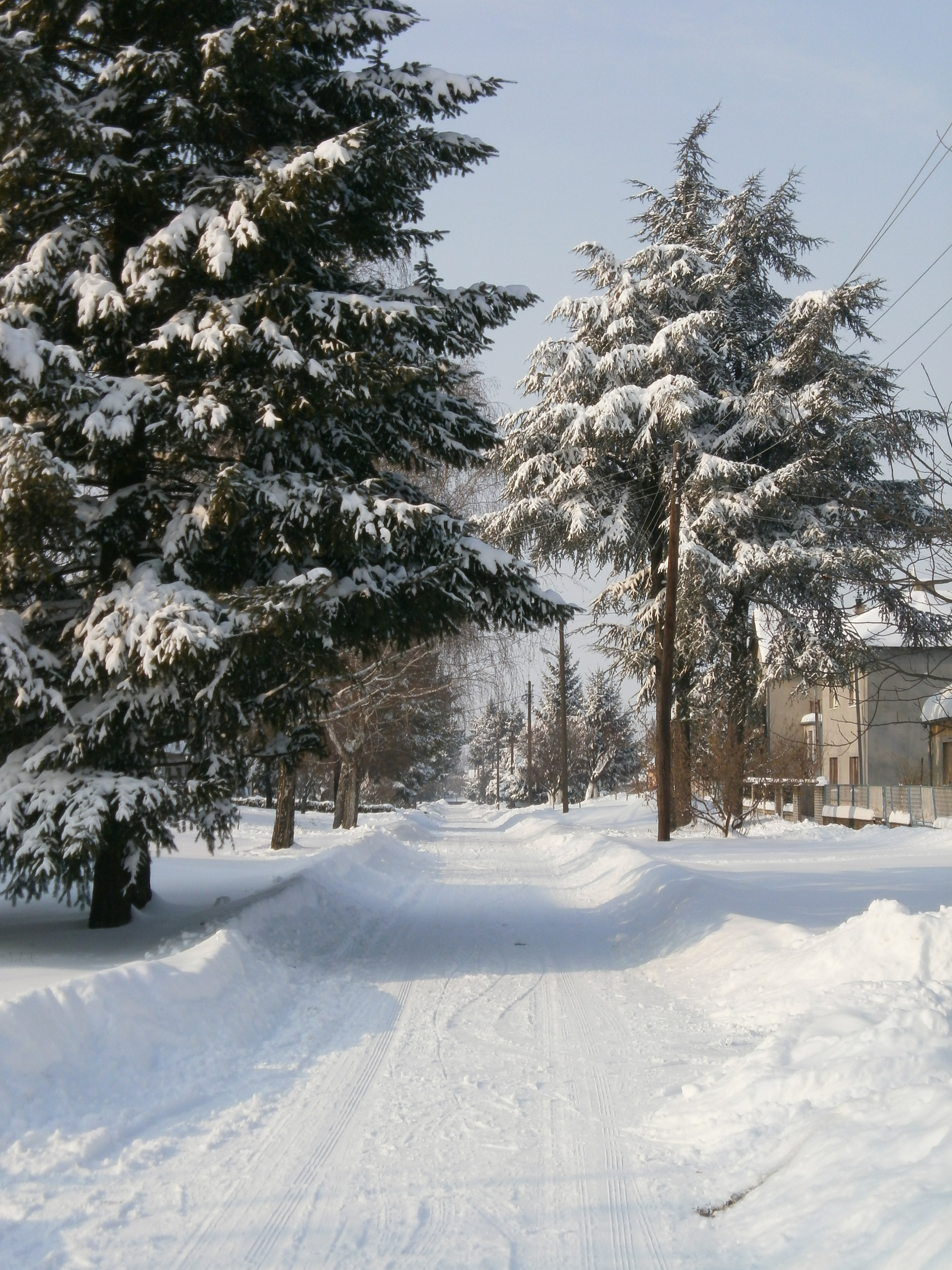

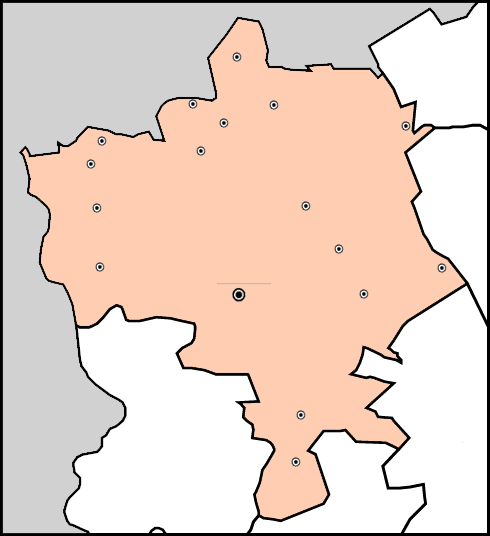

- Location within Vojvodina Location within Serbia Location within Europe
- Coordinates: 45°56′N 19°20′E
- Country: Serbia
- Province: Vojvodina
- Region: Bačka
- District: West Bačka
- Municipality: Sombor

Population (2002)
  - Total: 2,172
- Time zone: UTC+1 (CET)
  - Summer (DST): UTC+2 (CEST)

Aleksa Šantić (Serbian Cyrillic: Алекса Шантић) is a village located in the Sombor municipality, in the West Bačka District of Serbia. It is situated in the Autonomous Province of Vojvodina. The population of the village numbering 2,172 people (2002 census) and most of its inhabitants are ethnic Serbs.

== Name ==
The village is named (in 1924) after Aleksa Šantić, a Serb poet from Bosnia and Herzegovina. In Serbo-Croatian, the village is known as Aleksa Šantić (Алекса Шантић), and in Hungarian as Babapuszta, Sári, or Hadikkisfalu.

== History ==
In 1468, a settlement named Sáripuszta was mentioned at this location. The present-day village was founded between 1923 and 1926 and was settled by Serb volunteers from World War I. During the Hungarian Axis occupation in World War II, the name of the village was changed to Fernbach.

== Historical population ==
- 1961: 1,751
- 1971: 2,064
- 1981: 2,259
- 1991: 2,267
- 2002: 2,172
- 2011: 1,778

== See also ==
- List of places in Serbia
- List of cities, towns and villages in Vojvodina
