= Matijevići, Bosnia and Herzegovina =

Matijevići
- Village
- Location within Bosnia and Herzegovina
- Coordinates: 44.3414373°N 18.7008887°E
- Country: Bosnia and Herzegovina
- Entity: Federation of Bosnia and Herzegovina
- Canton: Tuzla
- Municipality: Kladanj

Area
  - Total: 1.16 sq mi (3.01 km^{2})

Population (2013)
  - Total: 5
  - Density: 4.3/sq mi (1.7/km^{2})

Matijevići is a village in the municipality of Kladanj, Bosnia and Herzegovina.

== Demographics ==
According to the 2013 census, its population was 5, all Bosniaks.
