= Elixir Group =

Serbian agribusiness company

- Native name: Еликсир Група
- Romanized name: Eliksir Grupa
- Company type: d.o.o.
- Industry: Agribusiness
- Founded: 16 May 1990; 36 years ago
- Headquarters: Bulevar Oslobođenja 79, Novi Sad, Serbia
- Area served: Worldwide
- Key people: Zorica Popović (Director), V Trikha (Co-Founder)
- Products: Complex mineral fertilizers, corn, frozen fruit, oilseeds roasted pyrite iron ore, wheat
- Revenue: ▲€506.95 million (2024)
- Net income: ▼€29.32 million (2024)
- Total assets: ▲€693.15 million (2024)
- Total equity: ▲€327.19 million (2024)
- Owner: Stanko Popović (100%)
- Number of employees: 1,965 (2024)
- Subsidiaries: Elixir Agrar; Elixir Feed; Elixir Food; Elixir Zorka; Elixir Prahovo
- Website: www.elixirgroup.rs

Elixir Group (full legal name: D.o.o za proizvodnju, promet i usluge Elixir Group Novi Sad) is a Serbian agribusiness company. It is headquartered in Novi Sad, Serbia.

== History ==
Founded on 16 May 1990, Elixir Group has since grown from a family company to one of the biggest Serbian companies in the field of agribusiness, fertilizing and the wholesale of other agriculture products. In the beginning, the company had 3 subsidiaries, Elixir Agrar, Elixir Feed and Elixir Food.

By the end of 2011, Elixir Group bought once a great Yugoslavian fertilizer company, Zorka Šabac, with the plans to rebuild a ruined processing capacities. On 16 July 2012 the company bought the main part of Negotin-based bankrupt company IHP Prahovo for 4 million euros. The company's main activity is producing phosphor components. In the first year of the company acquisition, Elixir Group invested more than 4.5 million euros, with plans of 25 million euros in the investments until 2015.

In May 2013, Elixir Zorka, a subsidiary of Elixir Group, opened a new fertilization facility, worth 30 million euros.

In June 2017, a French agribusiness company "Le Groupe Roullier" invested in Elixir's factory of monocalcium phosphate.

== Social responsibility ==
During the 2014 floodings in Serbia, the company donated 100 million dinars.

== See also ==
- Agriculture in Serbia
