= Futura plus =

Serbian retail and distribution company

- Official logo
- Native name: Футура плус
- Type: Joint-stock company
- Industry: Retail (Convenience stores)
- Founded: 28 September 2004; 21 years ago
- Headquarters: Belgrade, Serbia
- Area served: Serbia
- Key people: Saša Janićijević (Director)
- Revenue: ▲€65.00 million (2017)
- Net income: ▲€2.28 million (2017)
- Total assets: ▲€13.14 million (2017)
- Total equity: ▲€3.31 million (2017)
- Owner: Moj Kiosk (90.36%); Others
- Number of employees: 1,202 (2017)
- Parent: Moj Kiosk Group d.o.o.
- Website: www.futuraplus.rs

Futura Plus (Serbian Cyrillic: Футура плус) is a Serbian retail and distribution company, selling consumer goods, newspapers, non-alcoholic beverages and confectionery through Moj Kiosk convenience stores.

== History ==
=== 2004–2011 ===
The company was established on 28 September 2004. By November 2006, it acquired four Serbian socially owned companies that were unproductive at the time: small kiosk retail chains "Duvan, "Politika prodaja", "Borba" and "Duvan promet". It was a result of joint enterprise of "EMI Denmark Holding" (majority owned by Serbian businessman Stanko Subotić), "D Trade d.o.o." and German media company WAZ-Mediengruppe. According to at the time CEO of the company Sretko Vuković, in 2006 "Futura plus" already had annual revenue of 105 million euros. Also, as of 2006, "Futura plus" had 1,200 kiosk retail stores and 15% market share for kiosk retail stores, which were mostly selling tobacco cigarettes, electronic payments and print newspapers. The first outlet store under brand "Minut2" was opened in January 2007, with a total of 20 operated stores nationally by August of the same year.

In 2008, WAZ Media Group left "Futura Plus" immediately after the Serbian Prosecution raised accusations against Subotić, selling its 50% of shares in ownership structure.

By 2009, "Futura plus" became indebted company. On 4 June 2009, it minimized the distribution of the Večernje Novosti daily by lowering the number of distributed copies to 2,240 copies from the usual 54,000 copies per day. This followed the decision of Novosti to appeal in court for the payment of Futura Plus's outstanding debt towards the editor. It was claimed that the outstanding 90-days past due debt towards the company reached 53 million Serbian dinars. At the same time, it was claimed that the total debt of Futura Plus to the Media Association of Serbia companies (including non-past due) was at 180-250 million Serbian dinars.

The "Media Association of Serbia" made a decision to suspend all print media sales and halt the distribution of its editions to Futura Plus as of 14 September 2009. The decision was made jointly by Politika, Novosti, Ringier Srbija, Color Press Group, Press, Adria Media, Dnevnik and Ekonomist. The decision was reached after it was concluded that the company was endangering the activities of the print media in Serbia due to the considerable outstanding debt to the members of the association.

On 12 November 2009, despite enormous debt of RSD 900 million, print newspapers of all mentioned companies returned to "Futura plus" distribution.

=== 2011–present ===
In 2011, "Centro štampa Holding" acquired majority share in bankrupted "Futura plus" for 27.66 million euros. At the time of purchase, the company had 2,300 employees and a total of 800 kiosk retail stores. In March 2012, "Centro štampa Holding" re-branded all kiosk retail stores of "Futura plus" and "Štampa sistem" under "Moj Kiosk" brand name. In March 2014, "Futura plus" went out of bankruptcy, after four and a half years.

As of 2017, "Futura plus" together with its parent company Moj Kiosk Group conducts retail sales through "Moj Kiosk" brand of kiosk retail stores across Serbia. It also has regional and depot centres, and wholesale operations (suppliers, publishers, advertising companies, purchases) and services in the fields of marketing, distribution and transport.
