= Halkbank (Serbia) =

Serbian subsidiary of Halkbank

- Native name: Халкбанк а.д. Београд
- Romanized name: Halkbank banka a.d. Beograd
- Type: Joint-stock company
- Industry: Financial services
- Predecessor: Čačanska banka (1956–2015)
- Founded: 28 December 1990; 35 years ago (current form); 1956; 70 years ago (founded)
- Headquarters: Belgrade, Serbia
- Area served: Serbia
- Key people: Aziz Arslan (CEO)
- Products: Commercial banking, Investment banking
- Revenue: ▲€22.77 million (2019)
- Net income: ▲€4.02 million (2019)
- Total assets: ▲€595.22 million (2019)
- Total equity: ▲€102.89 million (2019)
- Owner: Halkbank (100%)
- Number of employees: 505 (2019)
- Website: halkbank.rs

Halkbank a.d. Beograd (Serbian: Халкбанк а.д. Београд, romanized: Halkbank a.d. Beograd) is a commercial bank in Serbia, a subsidiary of Halkbank.

== History ==
Former logo of Čačanska banka

Although founded back in 1956 under the name Komunalna banka za srez Čačak, renamed Čačanska banka in 1990.

In 2015, the Turkish Halkbank acquired 76.76 percent of shares of the Čačanska banka for 10.1 million euros, becoming the sole majority owner. Prior to the acquisition by the Turkish Halk Bankası, it had a network in 24 cities all over Serbia. In that same year, the bank changed its name to Halkbank and moved its head office from Čačak to Belgrade, due to the expansion of business.

As of 2017, its ownership structure consisted of: Halkbank (76.7%) and other minor parties.

It is listed on Belgrade Stock Exchange since 2006.

== See also ==
- List of banks in Serbia
