= Erste Bank (Serbia) =

Serbian subsidiary of Erste Group

- Native name: Ерсте банка а.д. Нови Сад
- Romanized name: Erste banka a.d. Novi Sad
- Type: Joint-stock company
- Industry: Finance and Insurance
- Predecessor: Novosadska banka
- Founded: 1965; 61 years ago (founded); 1864; 162 years ago (origins)
- Headquarters: Bulevar oslobođenja 5, Novi Sad
- Area served: Serbia
- Key people: Slavko Carić (CEO)
- Products: Commercial banking, Investment banking
- Revenue: ▲€73.04 million (2017)
- Net income: ▲€22.55 million (2017)
- Total assets: ▲€1.420 billion (2017)
- Total equity: ▲€177.77 million (2017)
- Owner: Erste Group (74%); Steiermärkische Bank (26%)
- Number of employees: 1,117 (2017)
- Parent: Erste Bank
- Website: erstebank.rs

Erste Bank a.d. Novi Sad (Serbian: Ерсте банка а.д. Нови Сад, romanized: Erste banka a.d. Novi Sad) is a commercial bank in Serbia, a subsidiary of Erste Group.

== History ==
The bank was founded in 1864 as Novosadska banka. In 2005, Austrian Erste Group took over the bank's majority share (83.3%) from the Government of Serbia for €73.2 million. In 2006, bank changed its name to Erste Bank.

== See also ==
- List of banks in Serbia
