= Fabrika reznog alata =

Serbian manufacturing company

- Official logo
- Native name: Фабрика резног алата
- Company type: Joint-stock company
- Industry: Tool manufacturing
- Founded: 31 December 1999; 26 years ago (Current form); 1 June 1953; 72 years ago (Founded)
- Fate: Bankruptcy procedure (as of October 2021)
- Headquarters: Hajduk Veljkova 37, Čačak, Serbia
- Area served: Worldwide
- Key people: Milan Vidaković (General director)
- Products: Drilling tools, hard metal tools, machines, milling cutters, shaping tools, threading tools
- Revenue: ▼€1.81 million (2020)
- Net income: ▲ (€6.71 million) (2020)
- Total assets: ▼€29.37 million (2020)
- Total equity: €0 (2020)
- Owner: Akcionarski fond a.d. (47.86%); PIO fond (9.79%); Others
- Number of employees: 483 (2020)
- Website: www.fra.co.rs

Fabrika reznog alata (abbr. FRA; full legal name: Akcionarsko društvo Fabrika reznog alata Čačak) is a Serbian tool manufacturing company, which is in bankruptcy procedure since October 2021. Its headquarters is in Čačak, Serbia. With around 480 employees as of 2020, it was one of the largest employers at the time in Čačak and Moravica District.

== History ==
Founded on 1 June 1953, the company originally focused on the production of carvers and taps. Since 1960, the company expanded its production to other threading tools, and tools for working openings and cutters. In the 1970s, the company was reorganized, and new production programs were established for particular types of tools and plants for production services. In May 1993, the company was at its peak of production, with more than 3350 employees.

Due to the breakup of Yugoslavia and the sanctions which were put into the effect during the 1990s, the company has begun to deteriorate. This is also due to the lack of good subcontractors, lack of investments in production facilities and various lawsuits based on unpaid wages.

However, the company has survived and continued to work in the 2000s with much reduced profitability. With more than 500 employees, it has gone through many financial problems and it is still recovering. In April 2007, it was submitted to the OTC market at the Belgrade Stock Exchange.

Since April 2010, the company is undergoing restructuring. Its main objectives are changes in the internal organization of the company and the clearance of arrears, in order to create conditions for the eventual privatization.

In May 2013, the company celebrated its 60th anniversary. In October 2021, the bankruptcy procedure over company was opened, due to insolvency and debt.

== Activity ==
The company exports its products to many countries, including the United States, Russia, Iran and Poland.
