= Severtrans =

Bus companies of Serbia

Severtrans a.d.
- Native name: Севертранс а.д.
- Company type: Joint-stock company
- Industry: Public Transport
- Founded: 8 July 1991; 34 years ago (Current form); 1947; 79 years ago (Founded)
- Headquarters: Sombor, Serbia
- Area served: Serbia
- Key people: Darko Bjelić (General director)
- Products: Bus, Coach services
- Revenue: ▼€5.83 million (2017)
- Net income: ▼€0.27 million (2017)
- Total assets: ▼€4.64 million (2017)
- Total equity: ▲€0.09 million (2017)
- Owner: APATINTRANS DOO (59.26%); Others
- Number of employees: 154 (2017)
- Website: www.severtrans.rs

Severtrans a.d. is an intercity bus company based in Sombor, Serbia. The company operates intercity coach services to various destinations in Serbia as well as several international destinations.

== History ==
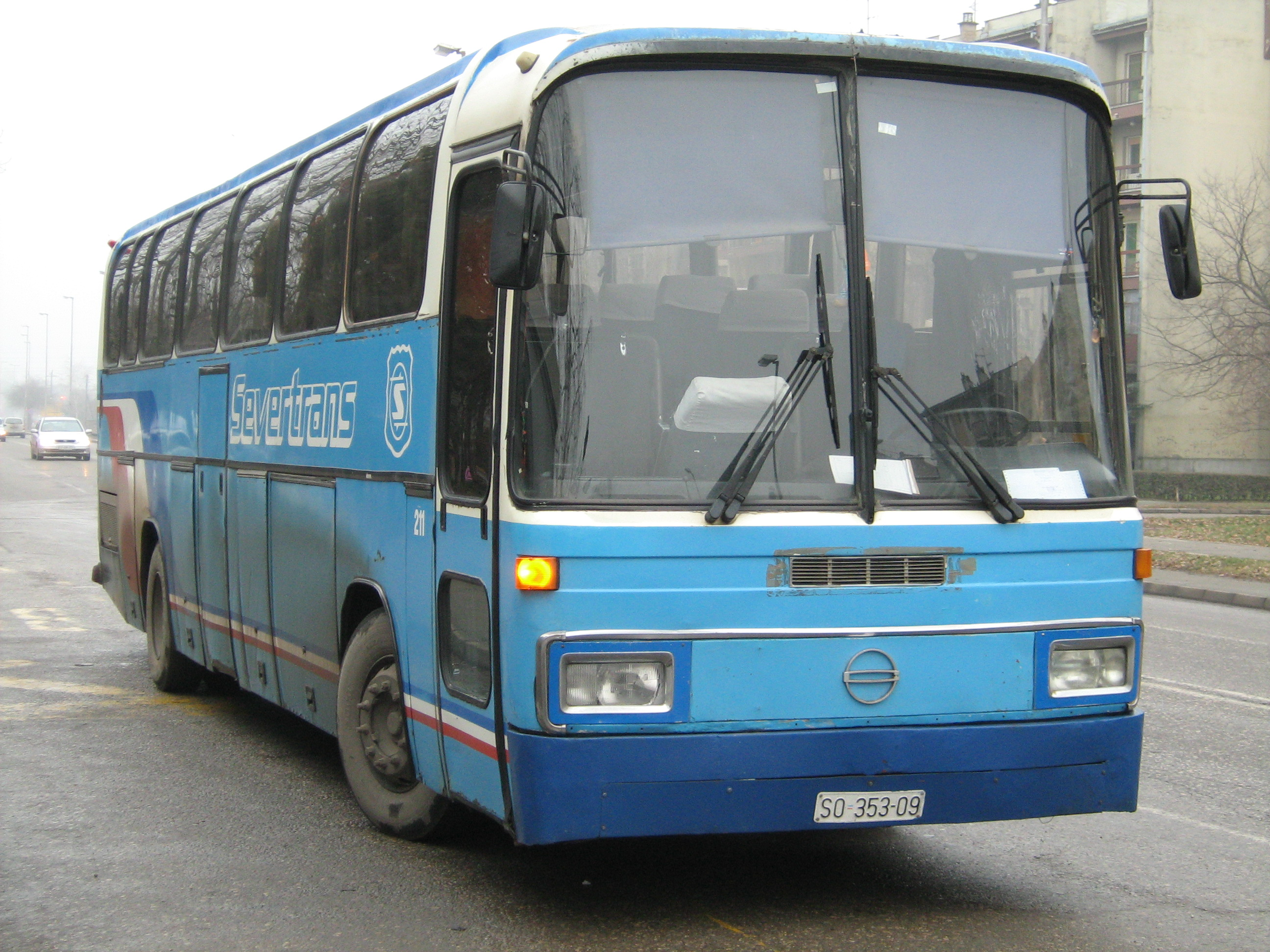
Severtrans coach bus in 2009

The company was founded in 1947 and began operating under the name "Severtrans" on December 13, 1966.

=== Privatization ===
In September 2007, controversial businessman Mile Jerković purchased Severtrans at a state-sponsored privatization auction in Novi Sad. In 2009 the Serbian state Agency for Privatization seized 53% of the company's assets from Jerković after he was sought after by the police for the suspicion of cooperating with Darko Šarić's drug cartel. Serbia's Agency for Privatization attempted to sell the company again in February 2012 without any success.
