= Securitas Services d.o.o. =

Serbian security company specialized

- Company type: d.o.o.
- Industry: Security services
- Founded: 19 June 2003; 22 years ago
- Headquarters: Autoput za Zagreb 18, Belgrade, Serbia
- Area served: Serbia
- Key people: Aleksandar Hajduković (Director)
- Services: Guarding, Monitoring, Cash handling, Analyzing-Consulting, Security education, Sale of Security systems
- Revenue: ▼€23.88 million (2017)
- Net income: ▼€0.27 million (2017)
- Total assets: ▼€17.20 million (2017)
- Total equity: ▲€15.66 million (2017)
- Owner: Securitas Sverige AB
- Number of employees: 3,893 (2017)
- Subsidiaries: SISTEM-FTO 011
- Website: www.securitas.com/rs/en/

Securitas Services d.o.o. (Privredno društvo Securitas Services d.o.o.) is a Serbian security company specializing in guarding, monitoring, cash handling, analyzing, consulting, security education, and the sale of security systems. The company has about 3,900 employees and is part of Securitas Sverige AB, with headquarters in Belgrade.
