= RT-RK =

Serbian software development house

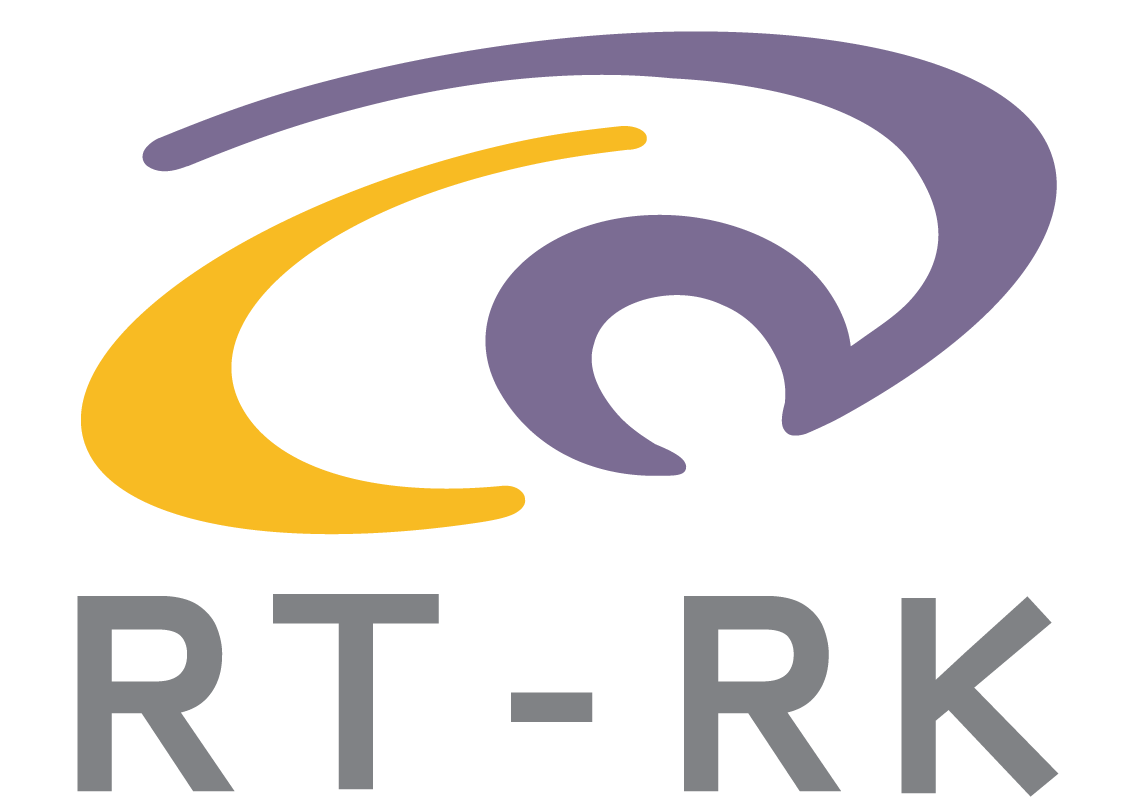
- Official logo

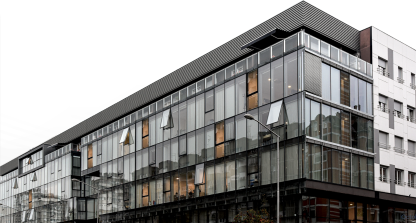
- RT-RK Headquarters
- Native name: РТ-РК
- Company type: LLC
- Industry: Automotive, Consumer electronics, Infotainment
- Founded: 1991; 35 years ago (Founded); 7 April 2005; 21 years ago (Current form)
- Headquarters: Narodnog fronta 23a, Novi Sad, Serbia
- Key people: Nikola Teslić (CEO); Milenko Berić (CFO)
- Products: Home audio, OBLO home automation/Internet of Things, TV software, Testing of Set-Top Box and multimedia devices
- Services: Embedded software, Automotive software, TV software, DSP software, Product development/small scale production, FPGA rapid prototyping, UI/UX design
- Revenue: ▲€30.23 million (2017)
- Net income: ▲€2.61 million (2017)
- Total assets: ▲€11.92 million (2017)
- Total equity: ▲€10.56 million (2017)
- Number of employees: 579 (2017)
- Website: www.rt-rk.com

RT-RK (Serbian Cyrillic: РТ-РК) is a Serbian R&D company and national research institute that develops software and hardware for real-time embedded systems, focusing on automotive, consumer electronics and infotainment systems. It is headquartered in Novi Sad, Serbia, and has offices in Belgrade, Banja Luka (Bosnia and Herzegovina) and Osijek (Croatia).

The company was founded in 1991 and currently employs more than 600 engineers. It operates under the umbrella of TTTech Group.

== History ==
In 1991, a small group of professors and assistants working at the University of Novi Sad Faculty of Technical Sciences, Chair for Computer Engineering, launched their first projects for telephony and digital signalling protocols (SSNo7, ISDN on DSS1 D channel). Their interest for business further evolved to automation processes in the Serbian oil industry, where they were involved in projects for gas pipeline management. In 1991, they founded a company named FTN-IRAM-RT. The close cooperation between FTN-IRAM-RT and the University of Novi Sad attracted Micronas, a German company, to launch MicronasNIT within the same environment and with the same management. Having become a Micronas’ subsidiary, MicronasNIT entered the era of expansion in DSP, FPGA and Digital TV technology. In 2005, MicronasNIT received the 'Exporter of the Year' award in the SME category from the Serbia Investment and Export Promotion Agency (SIEPA).

New technologies, customer service, and world-wide market access brought new customers, emerging the need for a new business model to provide these services. The new circumstances gave rise to foundation of a new company, RT-RK. In April 2009, RT-RK bought MicronasNIT, becoming the largest Serbian company for embedded system design.

The Ministry of Science and Technological Development of the Republic of Serbia accredited RT-RK Computer Based Systems LLC as a National Research and Development Institute. In their explanation, the Advisory Committee stated that the scientific programs of RT-RK contribute to the development of new products and devices, introduce new and improve existing technological processes, systems and services, and perform transfer of knowledge and technology. The company employs scientific researchers, offers programs for young developers, and has facilities, equipment, and other resources necessary to implement its programs.

== Operations ==
=== Automotive ===
RT-RK works on software/hardware aspects of real time applications running on System-on-Chips from various companies, including the likes of Texas Instruments, Qualcomm, Renesas, NVIDIA and, Infineon.

It carries out system software development, AUTOSAR porting and customization, projects complying with ASPICE processes and functional safety, UI/UX development, reference hardware design, and technology transfer to Tier 1/OEM. RT-RK is specialized in relevant operating systems and industry standards, such as Linux, ISO26262, Ethernet, FlexRay, MOST, HTML5, GENIVI.

These are the services the company is offering:

- Software and operating systems for ECU, based on AUTOSAR and functional safety standard ISO26262
- Software for driver assistance
- HMI development for Head Units, Instrument Cluster and Head-up Displays
- Development of In-Vehicle Infotainment systems (IVI) – including reception of TV signal and services
- Integration, customization, and development services (platform selection, OS, complex device drivers, communication, ECU abstraction, services, microcontroller abstraction, AUTOSAR RTE, and application software components)

Products:

- Automotive machine vision Middleware enables cross-platform execution of ADAS algorithms utilizing various inputs, outputs, and multiple processing cores.
- Automotive machine vision ALPHA reference board based on System-On-Chip of Texas Instruments. The board is intended for car manufacturers (OEMs), automotive design houses (Tier1/2/3) for rapid prototyping, TI automotive customers, and algorithm developers for demo purposes.

=== Digital TV software ===
In 2001, RT-RK initiated its involvement in digital TV through a joint venture with Micronas to develop software for televisions. Over time, this collaboration evolved from an extended workbench model to a system supplier role, eventually becoming a full Micronas subsidiary responsible for delivering digital TV software and providing substantial support to Micronas’ customers. When Micronas discontinued its consumer business unit, RT-RK became fully independent and continued its TV software development efforts.

RT-RK was the first company to announce the successful porting of the big-endian version of the Android™ operating system for the MIPS® architecture facilitating SoC manufacturers to use Android, targeting the market of Digital TVs (DTV), Set-Top Boxes (STB) and for applications in the digital home.

Zoran Corporation singled out RT-RK for porting Android onto their System on Chip (SOC), joining forces in development of multimedia applications and services for connected TV.

In 2011, RT-RK became a shareholder of iWedia, a Swiss-based company and operates as system integrator on Set-Top Box and TV software products based on their DVB middleware.

In 2012, RT-RK announced cooperation with General Satellite on their Set-Top Box GS-8305 deployed on the network of Tricolor TV, which was developed by RT-RK. Mass production of the box in their factory in Kaliningrad has been tested by the RT-RK’s BBT Set-Top Box testing products.

Its Android background was helpful to integrate IPTV and broadcast TV (DVB/ATSC) functionalities inside TV and STB devices powered by the Android operating system called ANDROID4TV, made Google conclude an agreement with the company to provide integration services to Google partners wishing to deploy Google TV in their products.

Android Set-Top Box deployments continue with Swisscom IPTV STB, and Bouygues Telecom Bbox Miami hybrid box with Google Mobile Services (Google Play Store, Google Music, Chrome, YouTube, Google Play Movies) certified by Google.

In September 2014, the company made ANDROID4TV software framework open source facilitating TV operators worldwide with the benefits of leveraging of Android openness, flexibility, and developers' community.

iWedia has many projects, including SAT>IP server and Linux-based H.264 Set-Top Box based on STMicroelectronics’ Liege chipset, both boxes being produced by RT-RK.

RT-RK continues operations providing services to other players in the Digital TV world, some of them being: SmarDTV, Vidmind, and Wyplay.

=== Home automation ===
OBLO home automation by RT-RK

OBLO enables home automation, including:

- Centralized automation via the control hub and the cloud
- Automation apps (mobile, web), to control home from any place, any time
- Connectivity among home devices like Zigbee, Z-Wave and Wi-Fi.
- Set of ready-made devices to automate lighting and energy consumption
- Blueprints for adding smart functionality to devices

OBLO is scalable and allows the selection and customization of components to make an automated home.

OBLO Off-the-shelf components	OBLO White-label product
Resell of existing hardware; Home gateway; Automation devices; Plug, socket; Dimmers (switch, microdimmer); Scene controller; Licensing OBLO software; Home gateway software; Applications (web, mobile); Stratus IoT cloud; Maintenance and service agreements	OEM hardware; Home gateway; As standalone device; Integrated within STB or TV; Proprietary plus 3rd party devices; Software components; Home gateway software; Applications (web, mobile); Stratus IoT cloud; Custom development; Powerline, SAT>IP, BT, NFC, etc.; Integration, customization, maintenance and service agreements

=== BBT (Black Box Testing) ===
RT-AV100 for Set-Top Box testing by RT-RK BBT

The line of RT-RK products codenamed BBT provides testing equipment and services to Set-Top Box and multimedia devices development and production.

Service/product	Customer
Software platforms for automatized and manual testing; Specialized hardware components for testing; End-to-end test management system; Test suites for functional, stress, and performance tests; Precertification test suites; Service of manual testing; Service of automatized testing; Testing and certification consulting services	IC vendors; Software module vendors and system integrators; OEMs and ODMs; Telecom operators; Diagnostic and repair facilities

RT-RK supports the Digital TV product lifecycle, from marketing through to development, production and qualification, superseding human testing labor by 600 man-days monthly, for the largest European and the third-largest OEM in the world Vestel.

As announced by the HbbTV Association, an initiative for providing an open standard for the delivery of broadcast and broadband services through connected TVs and set-top boxes, RT-RK is a supplier of majority test cases included in the HbbTV 2.0 test suite, in addition to all the applicable ones from the HbbTV 1/1.5 test suite and other sources. In addition, RT-RK supplies additional tests to cover the differences between HbbTV 2.0 and HbbTV 2.0.1, mostly required for the migration of Italy and the UK to HbbTV.

=== Near Shore Development Centre (NSDC) ===
RT-RK is a strategic partner and Near Shore Development Centre (NSDC) of Cirrus Logic, Imagination Technologies, Wyplay, Zenterio, and Vestel in the consumer electronics industry. In May 2015, TTTech, a technology leader in robust networked safety controls and a partner of Audi, acquired 35% of RT-RK’s share capital, forming a strategic partnership in the field of automotive electronics and industrial applications.

== Locations ==
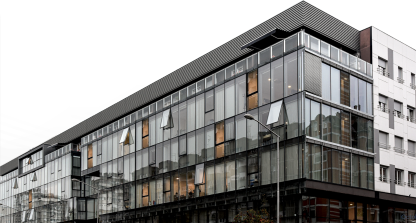
RT-RK in Novi Sad

RT-RK in Belgrade

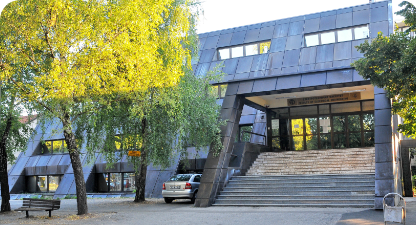
RT-RK in Banjaluka

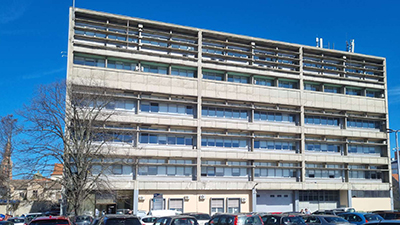
RT-RK in Osijek
