= List of banks in Serbia =

This is a list of banks in Serbia.

== Central bank ==
- National Bank of Serbia

== Commercial banks ==
As of 2026, there are 18 licensed commercial banks in Serbia. Below is a balance sheet total from 2026.

Column	Explanation
Bank	Bank's name in a simplified form
Capital	Majority owner origin
Headquarters	Location of bank's headquarters in Serbia
Assets	Amount of total assets of bank in million euros in given fiscal year

Bank	Capital	Headquarters	Assets
3banka	(Germany)	Novi Sad	316
Addiko Bank	(Austria)	Belgrade	1,035
Adriatic Bank	(Montenegro)	Belgrade	286
AikBank	(Serbia)	Belgrade	6,204
API Bank	(Grenada)	Belgrade	199
Banca Intesa	(Italy)	Belgrade	9,540
Bank of China	(China)	Belgrade	512
Banka Poštanska štedionica	(Serbia)	Belgrade	5,308
Erste Bank	(Austria)	Novi Sad	3,969
Halkbank	(Turkey)	Belgrade	1,523
Mirabank	(United Arab Emirates)	Belgrade	94
NLB banka	(Slovenia)	Belgrade	6,517
OTP banka	(Hungary)	Novi Sad	8,643
ProCredit Bank	(Germany)	Belgrade	1,541
Raiffeisen Bank	(Austria)	Belgrade	6,979
Srpska banka	(Serbia)	Belgrade	532
UniCredit Bank	(Italy)	Belgrade	6,652
Yettel Bank	(Czech Republic)	Belgrade	470
Total			60,326

== Representative offices ==
As of 2026, these were the registered representative offices of foreign banks within the National Bank of Serbia:

- Citibank, United States
- Deutsche Bank, Germany

== Defunct banks ==
These are banks that either lost their licence, or went into bankruptcy, or merged into another bank:

- Dafiment banka (May 1993)
- Jugoskandik (July 1993)
- BB Slavija banka (October 2001)
- Beogradska banka (January 2002)
- Beobanka (January 2002)
- Jugobanka (January 2002)
- Investbanka (January 2002)
- Borska banka (February 2004)
- Valjevska banka (November 2004)
- JIK banka (April 2005)
- Srpska komercijalna banka (December 2005)
- Control banka (January 2007)
- Medifarm banka (January 2007)
- Zepter banka (May 2007)
- Kombanka (June 2007)
- MONTEX banka (July 2007)
- Raj banka (November 2007)
- AIK Banka Senta (January 2008)
- BC Bank Credit (May 2008)
- Gold Internacional Bank (October 2008)
- Astra banka (October 2008)
- YU EKI banka (January 2009)
- Razvojna banka Vojvodine (2010)
- Agrobanka (May 2012)
- Nova Agrobanka (October 2012)
- Privredna banka (October 2013)
- Univerzal banka (February 2014)
- Findomestic Bank (November 2016)
- Jubanka (December 2017)
- Jugobanka Jugbanka (April 2018)
- Piraeus Bank (October 2018)
- Vojvođanska banka (April 2019)
- OTP banka (April 2021)
- Mts banka (July 2021)
- Direktna Banka (December 2021)
- NLB banka (April 2022)
- Naša AIK Banka (December 2022)
- Eurobank Direktna (March 2025)
- Alta banka (October 2026)

== See also ==
- Banking in Serbia
- List of banks in Europe
- List of banks in Yugoslavia
