= Industrija mesa Matijević =

Serbian meat industry holding company

Coordinates: 45°16′51″N 19°47′05″E

- Official logo
- Native name: Индустрија меса Матијевић
- Company type: d.o.o.
- Industry: Holding
- Founded: 7 January 1994; 32 years ago
- Headquarters: Rumenački put 86, Novi Sad, Serbia
- Area served: Serbia
- Key people: Branka Grubor (Director); Petar Matijević (Founder and CEO)
- Revenue: ▼€142.40 million (2018)
- Net income: ▼€10.11 million (2018)
- Total assets: ▲€296.34 million (2018)
- Total equity: ▲€239.14 million (2018)
- Owner: Petar Matijević (70%); Zora Matijević (30%)
- Number of employees: 2,012 (2018)
- Website: www.matijevic.rs

Industrija mesa Matijević (Serbian Cyrillic: Индустрија меса Матијевић) is a Serbian meat industry holding company with the headquarters in Novi Sad, Serbia. As of December 2017, it has a total of 41 companies within its holding, which performs a variety of services, such as agribusiness, wholesale and real estate.

== History ==
Industrija mesa Matijević was founded on 7 January 1994. As of 31 December 2017, Industrija mesa Matijević has 41 subsidiary companies within its holding. with most of them being in the region of Vojvodina – Bezdan, Bajmok, Lazarevo, Kolut and Aleksa Šantić farmsteads.

== Divisions ==
Agribusiness

The main activity of Industrija mesa Matijević is focused on agribusiness, specifically meat industry and grains production and wholesale. Most of its farmsteads are located in the region of Vojvodina – Bezdan, Bajmok, Lazarevo, Kolut and Aleksa Šantić. Industrija mesa Matijević manages around 33,000 hectares of agriculture land (around 330 square kilometers), of which 23,500 is in its ownership.

Two most notable subsidiaries of Industrija mesa Matijević are "MPZ–agrar" (farmsteads and crafting) and "MAT–agro" (grains wholesale).

Real estate

Also, Industrija mesa Matijević manages several real estate properties in Serbia through its subsidiary company "Mat real estate".

In January 2017, IM Matijević purchased the building in the center of Belgrade of the former Yugoslav conglomerate company "Jugoeksport", for a sum of 7.3 million euros. The company stated that it plans to renovate the building into the hotel, making it the company's fifth hotel after three hotels it already possesses in Novi Sad and one located in Zrenjanin.

In January 2018, IM Matijević bought "Slavija luks" hotel located at the Slavija Square in Belgrade, for a sum of 6.5 million euros.

== See also ==
- Agriculture in Serbia
