= AikBank =

Serbian banking and financial services company

- Native name: АикБанк а.д. Београд
- Romanized name: AikBank a.d. Beograd
- Type: Joint-stock company
- Industry: Banking
- Founded: 10 August 1993; 33 years ago
- Headquarters: Bulevar Arsenija Čarnojevića 59, Belgrade
- Area served: Serbia; Slovenia
- Key people: Petar Jovanović (CEO)
- Products: Retail banking; Commercial banking; Mortgage loans; Finance leasing; Factoring
- Revenue: ▲€230.95 million (2025)
- Net income: ▲€123.51 million (2025)
- Total assets: ▲€6.292 billion (2025)
- Total equity: ▲€885.19 million (2025)
- Owner: BDD M&V INVESTMENTS (100%)
- Number of employees: 2,192 (2025)
- Website: aikbank.rs

AikBank a.d. Beograd (Serbian: АикБанк а.д. Београд) is a Serbian commercial bank.

== History ==
AikBank initially was initially established in 1976 in Niš as an internal bank of the Agroindustrijsko komercijalna banka (AIK banka). In 1993, it became a full-fledged financial institution, working with legal entities and individual clients. In 2006, Greek ATEbank acquired 24.99% of common and 24.99% of preferential shares of AIK Banka.

In 2014, a Serbian company Sunoko (subsidiary of MK Group), became the major shareholder of the company with 50.37% of total shares at the time. In 2015, the bank moved its headquarters from Niš to Belgrade and changed its name to AIK Banka a.d. Belgrade. AIK Banka purchased a 21 percent stake of the Slovenian Gorenjska Banka in 2016. Locally, AIK Banka acquired 100% of shares of Alpha Bank in 2017. In 2017, AIK Banka recorded 101.97 million euros of net profit, the most in the Serbian banking sector. In 2021, AIK Banka bought the majority of shares of Serbian subsidiary of Sberbank.

In 2023, AIK Banka bought the majority of shares of another bank operating in Serbia, Eurobank Direktna, for a total of 280 million euros. It changed its name to AikBank in March 2025.

== See also ==
- List of banks in Serbia
- List of banks in Yugoslavia
