= Raiffeisen Bank (Serbia) =

Serbian subsidiary of Raiffeisen Bank International

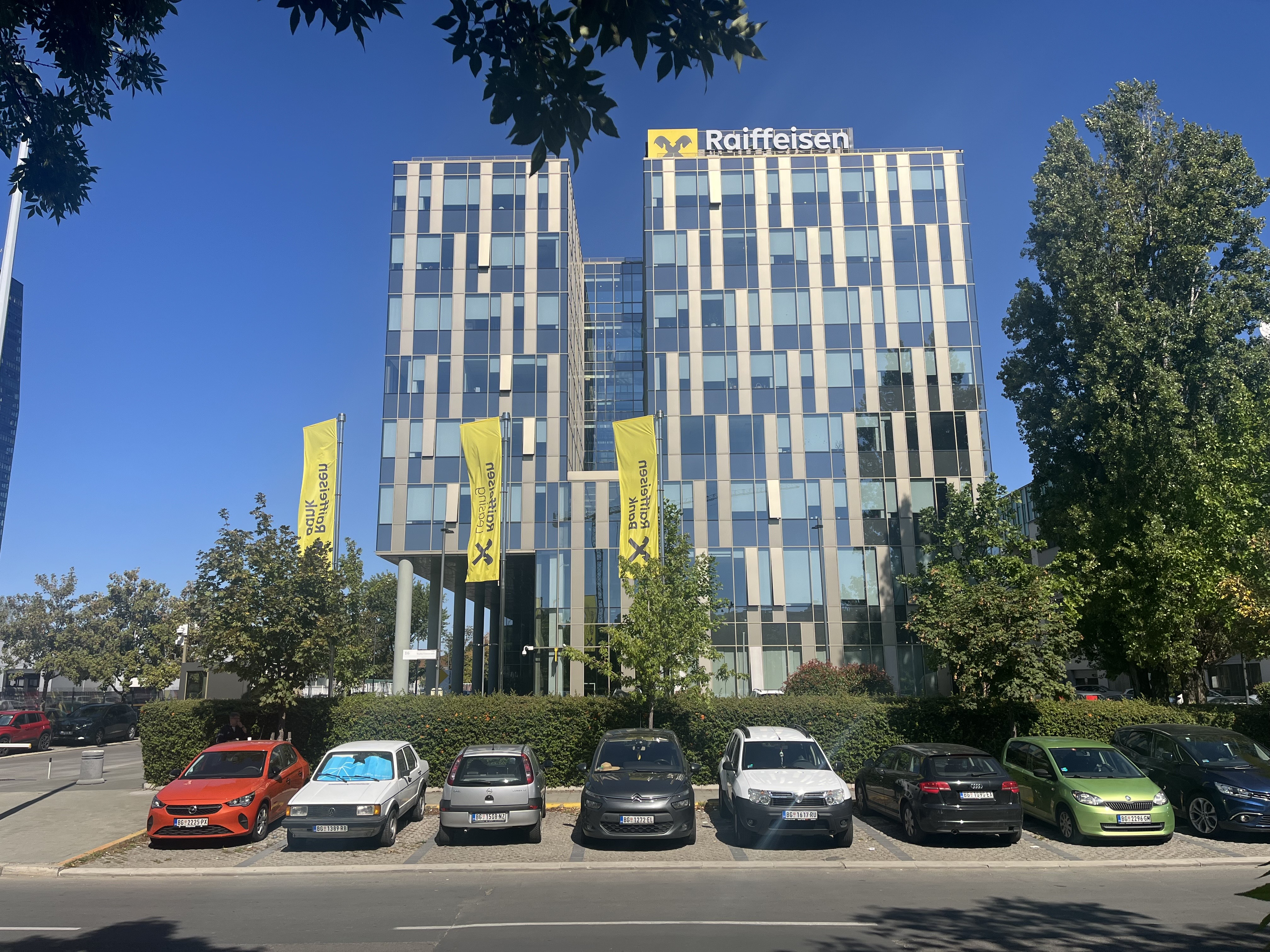
- Head office in Belgrade
- Native name: Рајфајзен банка а.д. Београд
- Romanized name: Rajfajzen banka a.d. Beograd
- Type: Subsidiary
- Industry: Finance and Insurance
- Founded: 19 February 2001; 25 years ago
- Headquarters: Đorđa Stanojevića 16, Belgrade
- Number of locations: 103 (2025)
- Area served: Serbia
- Key people: Zoran Petrović (CEO)
- Products: Commercial banking, Investment banking
- Net income: ▲€191.89 million (2023)
- Total assets: ▲€5.691 billion (2023)
- Total equity: ▲€900 million (2024)
- Owner: Raiffeisen International (100%)
- Number of employees: more than 2,200 (2025)
- Parent: Raiffeisen Bank International
- Subsidiaries: Raiffeisen Leasing d.o.o. Raiffeisen Futura a.d. Raiffeisen Invest a.d.
- Website: raiffeisenbank.rs

Raiffeisen banka a.d. Beograd (Serbian: Рајфајзен банка а.д. Београд, romanized: Rajfajzen banka a.d. Beograd) is a commercial bank in Serbia, a fully-owned subsidiary of Raiffeisen Bank International.

== History ==
Raiffeisen Bank obtained the operating licence in March 2001, became fully operational in July 2001, and officially started operations in October 2001 during the Austrian chancellor Wolfgang Schüssel's state visit to Belgrade. With a founding capital of €10 million (99% of it belonging to RZB and 1% to Austrian Uniqa Beteiligungs Holding GmbH - insurance company), it became the first 100% foreign-owned bank in then-Federal Republic of Yugoslavia. Starting from Belgrade, the bank gradually expanded its network all over Serbia.

By 2005, its market share reached 15.5%, making it Serbia's largest bank by total assets.

In 2021, Raiffeisen Bank signed an agreement to acquire 100% of the shares of the Serbian branch of Crédit Agricole.

== Operations ==
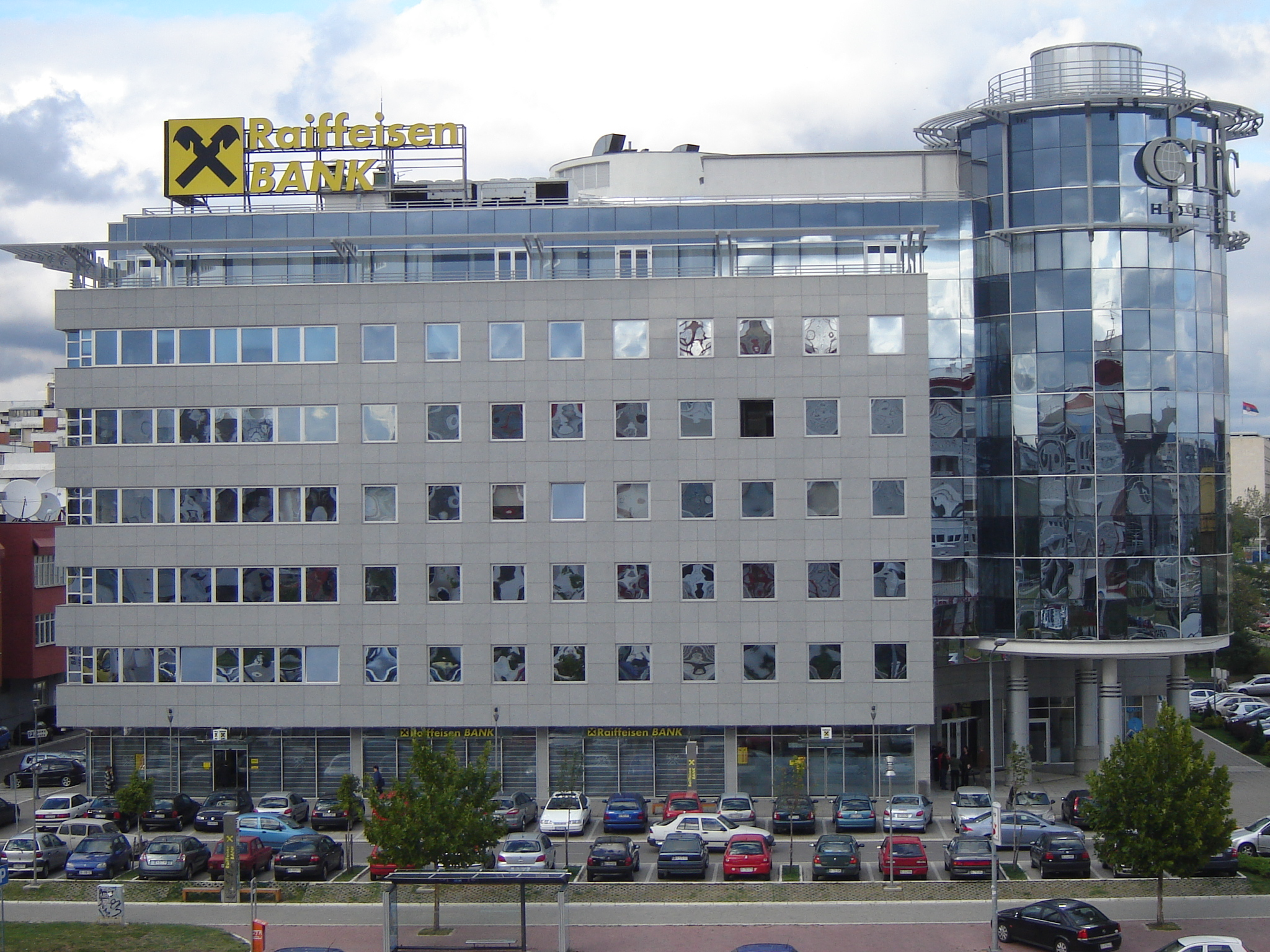
Raiffeisen Bank branch in New Belgrade

As a commercial bank, Raiffeisen Bank offers the full range of banking products and services to all major client segments, namely corporate customers, small businesses and entrepreneurs, as well as private individuals. It closely cooperates with subsidiaries Raiffeisen Leasing, Raiffeisen Future Voluntary Pension Fund and Raiffeisen Invest Fund Management Company.

Raiffeisen Bank is widely acknowledged in Serbia financial market by its leading online services and solutions such as Mbanking application or iKeš product, tailored made for younger generations.

It is present in various charity initiatives from the very beginning of its business in Serbia through its “Humanitarian fund Budimir Boško Kostić”. The bank supports theatre Jugoslovensko dramsko pozorište for 20 years and Basketball association of Serbia (Košarkaški savez Srbije) for more than 7 years. Its latest activity is focused on basketball courts in elementary schools in Serbia, achieved through cooperation with famous Serbian basketball player Bogdan Bogdanović.

== Awards ==
Among numerous awards received from 2002, Raiffeisen banka has been recently awarded “Best Bank in Serbia” in 2025 by renowned global financial magazine “Euromoney” and “Best Private Bank in Serbia” in 2025 by renowned global financial magazine “Global Finance”.

The bank has also been awarded Best Consumer Digital Bank in Serbia, Best Integrated Consumer Banking Site, Best Online Product Offerings, Best User Experience (UX) Design, Best Mobile Banking App and Best Integrated Consumer Banking Site in CEE by the same “Global Finance” magazine in 2025.

Among other awards Raiffeisen bank had been pronounced “Best Retail Bank in Serbia” in 2024, “Best Bank for Digital Solutions in Serbia” in 2023 by “Euromoney” and “Best Private bank in Serbia” by “Global Finance”, “Best Private Bank” in 2022 and 2021 by the “Global Finance” magazine, “Best Bank in Serbia” in 2021 by “Euromoney”. The list of awards received from the both magazines spans to 2002.

== See also ==
- List of banks in Serbia
