= Moj Kiosk =

Serbian holding company

Moj Kiosk Group
- Official logo
- Native name: Мој Киоск група
- Romanized name: Moj Kiosk grupa
- Type: d.o.o.
- Industry: Holding
- Founded: 9 April 1976; 50 years ago
- Headquarters: Belgrade, Serbia
- Area served: Serbia
- Key people: Sanja Stanić (Director)
- Services: "Moj Kiosk" convenience stores
- Revenue: ▲€378.51 million (2018)
- Net income: ▲€4.48 million (2018)
- Total assets: ▼€81.79 million (2018)
- Total equity: ▲€14.36 million (2018)
- Owner: Property Plus Establishment (99.94%); Darko Bajčetić (0.06%)
- Number of employees: 3,464 (2018)
- Subsidiaries: Futura plus Štampa sistem Centrosinergija; Construct Invest
- Website: www.mojkioskgroup.rs

Moj Kiosk Group (Serbian: Мој Киоск група, romanized: Moj Kiosk grupa) is a Serbian holding company with headquarters in Belgrade, Serbia. It has five subsidiaries and performs variety of services, such as distribution and retail of consumer goods, newspapers, non-alcoholic beverages and confectionery through "Moj Kiosk" convenience stores.

== History ==
The company was established in 1976 under name "Centroproizvod". In 2011, "Centroproizvod" acquired majority share in "Štampa Sistem" for 5 million euros and in bankrupted Futura plus for 27.66 million euros. At the time of purchase, Futura plus had 2,300 employees and a total of 800 kiosk retail stores. In March 2012, "Centro štampa Holding" re-branded all kiosk retail stores of "Futura plus" and "Štampa sistem" under "Moj Kiosk" brand name. In March 2014, "Futura plus" went out of bankruptcy, after four and a half years. In the same month, "Centro štampa" opened facility in Ub where convenience stores are being manufactured and repaired. In March 2015, all subsidiary companies under "Centro štampa Holding" became subsidiaries of "Centroproizvod" holding company. "Centroproizvod" later changed its name to "Moj Kiosk Group".

As of 2017, Moj Kiosk Group subsidiaries Futura plus and "Centro štampa" conducts retail sales through "Moj Kiosk" brand of kiosk retail stores across Serbia. It also has regional and depot centres, and wholesale operations (suppliers, publishers, advertising companies, purchases) and services in the fields of marketing, distribution and transport.

== Ownership ==
As of July 2019, "Property Plus Establishment" company which is run by Serbian businessman Darko Bajčetić is the majority owner of Moj Kiosk Group.

== See also ==
- List of companies of the Socialist Federal Republic of Yugoslavia
