= Banca Intesa (Serbia) =

Serbian subsidiary of Intesa Sanpaolo

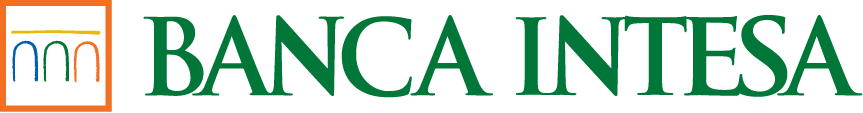
- Native name: Банка Интеза а.д. Београд
- Romanized name: Banca Intesa a.d. Beograd
- Type: Joint-stock company
- Industry: Financial services
- Founded: 15 October 1991; 35 years ago
- Headquarters: Milentija Popovića 7 b, Belgrade
- Area served: Serbia
- Key people: Draginja Đurić (CEO)
- Products: Retail, investment and private banking, investment management, public finance
- Revenue: ▲€230.11 million (2017)
- Net income: ▲€100.11 million (2017)
- Total assets: ▲€4.846 billion (2017)
- Total equity: ▲€352.48 million (2017)
- Owner: Intesa Sanpaolo (93%); IFC (7%)
- Number of employees: 3,011 (2017)
- Parent: Intesa Sanpaolo
- Subsidiaries: Intesa Leasing
- Website: bancaintesa.rs

Banca Intesa a.d. Beograd (Serbian: Банка Интеза а.д. Београд) is a commercial bank in Serbia, a subsidiary of Intesa Sanpaolo.

== History ==
The bank was founded in 1991 as Delta banka. In 2005, Banca Intesa acquired 75% stake in the bank for €278 million. The bank has been trading on Belgrade Stock Exchange (BELEX) since 2006. Following the 2006 merger of Banca Intesa and Sanpaolo IMI, Sanpaolo IMI’s Serbian subsidiary Panonska banka was merged into Banca Intesa in 2008, having initially remained a separate entity.

== See also ==
- List of banks in Serbia
