= UniCredit Bank (Serbia) =

Serbian subsidiary of UniCredit

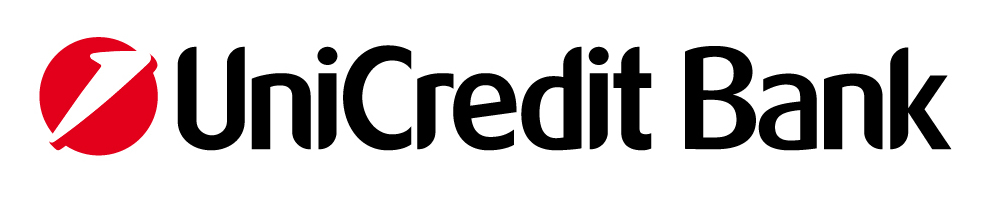
- Native name: Уникредит банка Србија а.д. Београд
- Romanized name: UniCredit Bank Srbija a.d. Beograd
- Formerly: HVB Banka Srbija a.d. Beograd
- Type: Joint-stock company
- Industry: Financial services
- Founded: 11 June 2001; 25 years ago
- Headquarters: Belgrade, Serbia
- Area served: Serbia
- Key people: Nikola Vuletić (CEO)
- Products: Retail, investment and private banking, investment management, public finance
- Revenue: ▲€331.02 million (2024)
- Net income: ▲€205.57 million (2024)
- Total assets: ▲€6.514 billion (2024)
- Total equity: ▲€966.21 million (2024)
- Owner: UniCredit (100%)
- Number of employees: 1,354 (2024)
- Website: unicreditbank.rs

UniCredit Bank Srbija a.d. Beograd (Serbian: Уникредит банка Србија а.д. Београд, romanized: Unikredit banka Srbija a.d. Beograd) is a commercial bank in Serbia, a fully-owned subsidiary of UniCredit.

== History ==
UniCredit Bank Serbia was owned by Bank Austria, which in turn was majority owned by German bank HypoVereinsbank (HVB), which was, in turn, majority owned by Italian-based UniCredit banking group since 2005. In 2007, the bank officially changed its name to UniCredit Bank Srbija. In 2016, UniCredit became the directly parent company of the bank.

== See also ==
- List of banks in Serbia
