= Jubanka =

Serbian banking and financial services company

- Native name: Јубанка
- Company type: Joint-stock company
- Industry: Finance and Insurance
- Predecessor: Jubanka (1991–2005); Alpha Bank Srbija (2005–2017)
- Founded: 7 January 1991
- Defunct: 25 December 2017
- Fate: Merged into AIK Banka
- Successor: AIK Banka (since 2017)
- Headquarters: Belgrade, Serbia
- Area served: Serbia
- Products: Commercial banking, Investment banking
- Total assets: ▼€602.11 million (2016)
- Total equity: ▲€94.65 million (2016)
- Owner: AIK Banka (100%)
- Number of employees: 924 (2016) cca. 100 (December 2017)

Jubanka (Serbian Cyrillic: Јубанка), formerly known as Alpha Bank Srbija, was a commercial bank based in Belgrade, Serbia. In December 2017, following the purchase in April 2017, it merged into AIK Banka.

== History ==
The bank was founded in 1991 as Jubanka and was the fifth-largest bank in Serbia as of 2005. On 26 January 2005, Greek Alpha Bank officially agreed the purchase of an 88.64% stake in Serbian Jubanka. By June 2005, its name was changed to Alpha Bank Beograd.

In April 2017, AIK Banka (majority owned by MK Group) purchased 100% of shares of the company, and reverted its former name Jubanka. On 22 December 2017, Jubanka has completed the process of merging into AIK Banka and more than 800 of its employees have left the company from June until December 2017. Since 25 December 2017, Jubanka operates under name AIK Banka. Also, housing and cash loans to citizens, as well as credit card debt, took Société Générale Srbija.

== See also ==
- List of banks in Serbia
