= NLB Bank (Serbia) =

Serbian subsidiary of NLB Group

NLB banka
- Native name: НЛБ банка а.д. Београд
- Romanized name: NLB banka a.d. Beograd
- Type: Joint-stock company
- Industry: Financial services
- Founded: 29 April 2022; 4 years ago (current form); 1 December 1970; 55 years ago (founded)
- Headquarters: Bulevar Mihajla Pupina 165 b, Belgrade
- Area served: Serbia
- Key people: Vlastimir Vuković (CEO)
- Products: Commercial banking, Investment banking
- Revenue: ▲€161.04 million (2021)
- Net income: ▲€23.62 million (2021)
- Total assets: ▼€4.162 billion (2021)
- Total equity: ▼€643.40 million (2021)
- Owner: NLB Group (100%)
- Number of employees: 2,745 (2021)
- Website: nlb.rs

NLB banka a.d. Beograd (Serbian: НЛБ банка а.д. Београд), is a commercial bank in Serbia, a fully-owned subsidiary of NLB Group.

== History ==
Logo of Komercijalna banka, prior to NLB's 2022 acquisition

Komercijalna Banka (lit. 'Commertcial Bank') was founded in 1970. In 1992, it was transformed into joint-stock company, with the Government of Serbia being its majority owner.

In 2002, Komercijalna banka established subsidiary Komercijalna banka Budva, operating in Montenegro.. The bank also had a subsidiary in Bosnia and Herzegovina, Komercijalna banka Banja Luka.

In 2019, the Government of Serbia increased its stake in ownership by acquiring 6.8% of shares from DEG and Swedfund International for 43.7 million euros. Later that year, the Government of Serbia acquired 34.58% of shares from EBRD and International Finance Corporation for 217 million euros, increasing its stake in the bank to 83.23% of shares.

In 2020, the Government of Serbia signed an agreement to sell its 83.23% stake in the bank to the Slovenian NLB Group for €387.02 million with bank changing its name to NLB Komercijalna banka. In 2022, NLB Komercijalna banka withdrew from the Belgrade Stock Exchange. In 2026, the bank changed its name to NLB Banka.

== See also ==
- List of banks in Serbia
