= Société Générale (disambiguation) =

Société générale (French pronunciation: [sɔsjete ʒeneʁal]) means "general company" or "general society" in French, and was included in the name of many legal entities, particularly in the 19th and early 20th centuries, starting with the Société Générale de Belgique in 1822. In contemporary usage, it generally refers to Société Générale, a French banking group, unless context indicates otherwise.

== Société Générale Group ==
- Société Générale (est. 1864), originally the Société Générale pour Favoriser le Développement du Commerce et de l'Industrie en France

=== Group subsidiaries ===
- Komerční banka in the Czech Republic
- Societe Generale Ghana
- Société Générale de Banque au Liban (SGBL) in Lebanon
- BRD – Groupe Société Générale in Romania
- Societe Generale bank Montenegro

=== Former subsidiaries ===
- Banque de Salonique in the Ottoman Empire
- Banque du Nord in the Russian Empire
- Splitska banka in Croatia, later owned by OTP Bank
- MobiasBanca in Moldova, later owned by OTP Bank
- Société Générale Pakistan, later Meezan Bank
- Rosbank in Russia, sold in 2022
- SKB (Slovenia) in Slovenia, later owned by OTP Bank
- Société Générale Yugoslav Bank and Société Générale Srbija, later OTP banka Srbija a.d.

=== Other links ===
- Tours Société Générale, the group head office in Paris La Défense
- Société Générale Bank Heist, a 1976 bank robbery in Nice
- Baden v Société Générale, a 1983 UK law case
- 2008 Société Générale trading loss, a financial crisis episode
- Société Générale, London Branch v Geys, a 2012 UK labor law case

== Other corporate entities ==
- Société Générale de Belgique (SGB, est. 1822), later acquired by Suez Lyonnaise
  - Société Générale des Minerais (SOGEMIN, est. 1919 in Liège), a mining subsidiary
- Société générale de Crédit mobilier (est. 1852), also known as the Crédit Mobilier
- Société générale des annonces (SGA, est. 1857), later part of Havas
- Société Générale de Crédit Industriel et Commercial (CIC, est. 1859), also known as the Crédit Industriel et Commercial
- Société Générale de l'Empire Ottoman (SGEA, est. 1864)
- Société Générale Algérienne (SGA, est. 1865), later restructured as Compagnie Algérienne
- Société générale des transports maritimes (est. 1865), later part of Chargeurs
- Société Générale de Surveillance (SGS, est. 1878), later SGS S.A.
- Société Générale des Chemins de Fer Economiques (est. 1880 in France), later Chemins de fer et transport automobile
- Société Générale de Touage et de Remorquage (est. 1898), later Touax
- Société Générale d'Enterprises (SGE, est. 1899), later part of Vinci SA
- Societé Générale des Voitures Automobiles Otto (est. 1900)
- Société générale suisse des chocolats Peter et Kohler réunis (est. 1904), later part of Nestlé
- Société Générale de Construction Mécaniques (est. 1911), later part of SEMT Pielstick
- Société Générale des Constructions Industrielles et Mécaniques (SGCIM, est. 1918), formerly Etablissements Borel
- Société Générale des Transports Aériens (SGTA, est. 1919), later part of Air France
- Société Générale des Films (est. 1923), producer of movies such as The Passion of Joan of Arc
- Société générale de financement (est. 1962), later merged into Investissement Québec
- Société Générale Congolaise des Minérais (Gecomin, est. 1967), later Société Générale des Carrières et des Mines or Gécamines
- Société Générale pour les techniques Nouvelles (SGN, est. 1978), later part of Orano
- Société Générale du Cinéma du Québec (SGCQ, est. 1982), later Société de développement des entreprises culturelles
- Societe Generale Haitienne de Banque (est. 1986), also known as Sogebank

== Non-profit entities ==
- Société générale de l'industrie horlogère suisse SA (est. 1931), also known by its German name Allgemeine Gesellschaft der Schweizerischen Uhrenindustrie
