= List of banks in Montenegro =

The following list of banks in Montenegro is as published by the Central Bank of Montenegro, the bank supervisory authority of Montenegro, on their website as of 2 April 2026.

== List of banks ==
	Bank	Capital	Headquarters
1	CKB Banka, subsidiary of OTP Bank	(Hungary)	Podgorica
2	Hipotekarna Banka AD, subsidiary of AikGroup	(Serbia)	Podgorica
3	Prva Banka Crne Gore AD	(Montenegro)	Podgorica
4	Erste Bank AD, subsidiary of Erste Group	(Austria)	Podgorica
5	NLB Banka AD, subsidiary of NLB Group	(Slovenia)	Podgorica
6	Addiko Bank AD, subsidiary of Addiko Bank	(Austria)	Podgorica
7	Universal Capital Bank AD	(Montenegro)	Podgorica
8	Lovćen Banka AD	(Montenegro)	Podgorica
9	Zapad Banka AD	(Ukraine)	Podgorica
10	Ziraat Bank Montenegro AD, subsidiary of Ziraat Bank	(Turkey)	Podgorica
11	Adriatic Bank AD	(United States)	Podgorica

== Former banks ==
- Bank of Montenegro (1906-1918)
- Investment Bank Titograd (IBT), renamed Montenegrobanka in 1990, acquired 2003 by NLB
- National Bank of Montenegro (1971-1993)
- Ekos Bank, liquidated 2003-2018
- Euromarket Banka, acquired 2006 by NLB
- Nikšićka Banka, renamed 2007 as Prva Banka Crne Gore
- Opportunity Bank, acquired by Erste Bank and renamed 2009
- Podgorička Banka, renamed 2012 as Societe Generale bank Montenegro, absorbed 2020 into Crnogorska Komercijalna Banka
- Invest Banka Montenegro AD, in liquidation
- Atlas Banka AD, in liquidation

== See also ==
- List of banks in the euro area
- List of banks in Europe
- List of banks in Yugoslavia
