= List of banks in Moldova =

Head office of MAIB

Head office of MoldIndConBank

Head office of VictoriaBank

Head office of OTP Bank Moldova

Head office of ProCredit Moldova

Head office of EximBank

Head office of EnergBank

Head office of FinComBank

Head office of Euro Credit Bank

The following list of banks in Moldova is as published by the National Bank of Moldova, the bank supervisory authority of Moldova, on their website as of 24 October 2026.

== Commercial banks ==
As of October 2026, the following banks were licensed to operate in Moldova:

- Comerțbank SA (SWIFT: CMTBMD2X)
- Energbank SA (SWIFT: ENEGMD22)
- EuroCreditBank SA (SWIFT: ECBMMD2X)
- EximBank SA (SWIFT: EXMMMD22)
- Moldindconbank SA (SWIFT: MOLDMD2X)
- Moldova Agroindbank SA (maib, SWIFT: AGRNMD2X)
- ProCredit SA, subsidiary of ProCredit Holding (SWIFT: PRCBMD22)
- Victoriabank SA (SWIFT: VICBMD2X)
- Banca de Finante si Comert SA (SWIFT: FTMDMD2X)
- OTP Bank SA, subsidiary of OTP Group (SWIFT: MOBBMD22)

As of early 2026, total assets of the sector reached around 175–180 billion MDL. The sector is highly concentrated, with the three largest banks (maib, Moldindconbank, and Victoriabank) accounting for the majority of total assets.

== Former banks ==
=== Banks undergoing liquidation ===
- Basarabia
- BIID MB
- Guinea
- Întreprinzbancă
- InvestPrivatBank
- Vias

=== Defunct banks ===
- Bancosind liquidated 2018
- Banca de Economii
- Banca Socială
- Banca Municipală Chișinău
- BTR Moldova
- Bucuriabank dissolved 2016
- Businessbank
- Oguzbank liquidated 2018
- Unibank
- Universalbank liquidated 2021

MobiasBanca was bought by OTP Bank in 2019. BCR Chișinău was purchased by Victoriabank in 2025.

== See also ==
- List of banks in Europe
