= NLB Banka Podgorica =

Bank in Montenegro

- Type: Subsidiary
- Industry: Financial services
- Predecessor: Investment Bank Titograd
- Founded: 2003; 23 years ago
- Headquarters: Podgorica, Montenegro
- Area served: Montenegro
- Products: Commercial banking, Investment banking
- Parent: NLB Group
- Website: www.nlb.me

NLB Banka Podgorica (full name: NLB Banka a.d. Podgorica) is a bank operating in Montenegro, based in the city of Podgorica. Its parent is the Ljubljana-based NLB Group, which absorbed Montenegrobanka in 2003, Euromarket Banka in 2006, and Komercijalna Banka Budva in 2021.

== History ==
NLB won the privatization process for Montenegrobanka in June 2003, thus becoming the largest bank in Montenegro. It also absorbed Euromarket Banka in 2006.

Separately, Belgrade-based Komercijalna Banka established Komercijalna Banka Budva in November 2002, which received a banking license in 2003 from the Central Bank of Montenegro.

On 26 February 2020, the government of Serbia signed a purchase agreement worth 387 million euros with NLB for 83.23% of shares in Komercijalna Banka, following which NLB Banka Podgorica fully absorbed Komercijalna Banka Budva on 14 November 2021. Since then, NLB Banka has been the second-largest bank in Montenegro.

Despite the historical discontinuity, NLB Banka Podgorica portrays itself as the continuating entity of the Bank of Montenegro, established in 1906.

== See also ==
- List of banks in Montenegro
