= Perun (disambiguation) =

Perun is a Slavic god.

Perun may also refer to:

- Perun (comics), a Marvel Comics character based on the Slavic god
- Perun (rocket), a Polish rocket for high-altitude research
- Montenegrin perun, a historical currency
- Peryn, a peninsula near Veliky Novgorod (Russia)
- Peryn Chapel, the Church of the Nativity of the Theotokos on Peryn
- Parndorf, a town in Austria originally known as Perun
