= CKB =

CKB, Ckb or ckb may refer to:

- North Central West Virginia Airport, US, IATA code
- Sorani, Central Kurdish branch language, ISO 639-3 code
- The Cracow Klezmer Band, a Polish band
- Crazy Ken Band, a Japanese band
- CKB Banka, a bank in Montenegro
- CKB (gene), a gene that encodes brain-type creatine kinase
- Chung Khiaw Bank, a Singapore bank with branches and subsidiaries in Malaysia and Hong Kong
- CK Birla Group, Indian conglomerate
  - C. K. Birla, Indian businessman, founder of the group
