= Montenegrin perper =

Currency of Montenegro from 1906 to 1918

Црногорски перпер
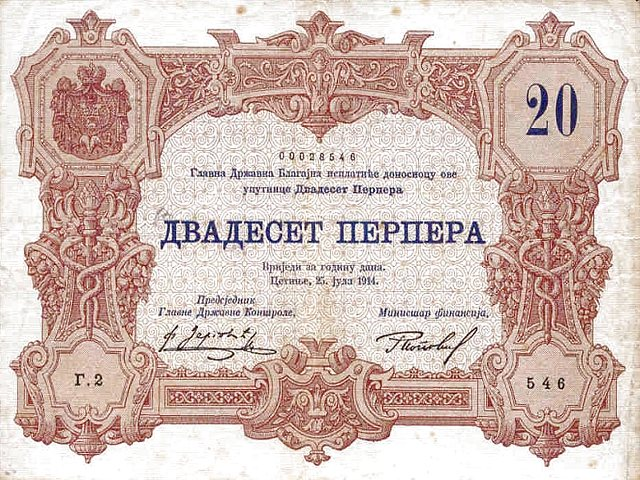
20 perpera banknote.
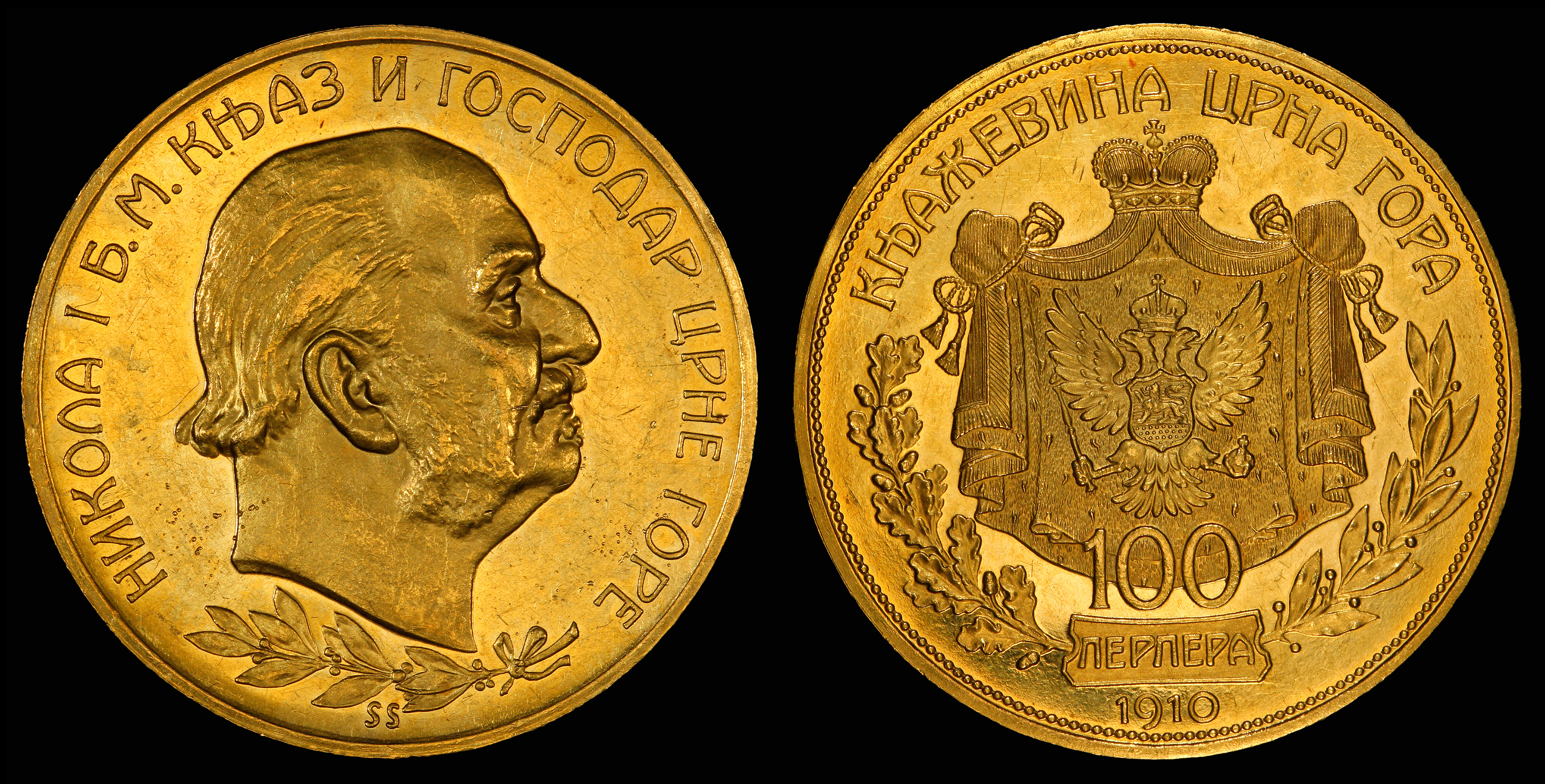
100 perpera obverse, coin minted in 1910.

Units of account
- Plural: The language(s) of this currency belong(s) to the Slavic languages. There is more than one way to construct plural forms.
- Subunit
- 1/100: Para

Denominations
- Banknotes: 1, 2, 5, 10, 20, 50, 100 perpera
- Coins: 1, 2, 10, 20 para, 1, 2, 5, 10, 20, 100 perpera

Demographics
- User(s): Principality of Montenegro; Kingdom of Montenegro
- This infobox shows the latest status before this currency was rendered obsolete.

The perper (Serbian Cyrillic: перпер; plural перпери) was the currency of Montenegro between 1906 and 1918. Named after the Byzantine hyperpyron, it was divided into 100 para.

At the end of the 20th century, Montenegro contemplated issuing the perper again. However, it decided to unofficially adopt the Deutsche mark instead, and later followed the change to the euro.

== Coins ==
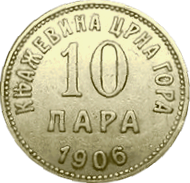
10 para (1906)

In 1906, coins were issued in denominations of 1, 2, 10 and 20 para. The 1 and 2 para were bronze, the 10 and 20 para were nickel. The nickel and copper coins were minted in Vienna. In 1909, silver 1 and 5 perpera coins were added, followed by 2 perpera in 1910. Gold 10 and 20 perpera were also issued in 1910, along with very limited numbers of 100 perpera coins. Bronze, nickel, and silver coins were issued several times until 1914.

In 1909, simultaneously with the decision to issue silver coins, minting gold Montenegrin coins was also being planned. However, due to tight relations with Austro-Hungary, gold coins were issued one year later than silver ones.

In 1910, Montenegro issued two series of gold 10, 20, and 100 perpera coins. The inscription on the first ones reads Principality of Montenegro while the second one mentions the Kingdom of Montenegro. This is due to the fact that on 28 August 1910, Prince Nicholas of Montenegro proclaimed the Kingdom of Montenegro. The second issue also commemorates his 50th anniversary of reign. Due to historical circumstances, these were the only golden perper issues in the history of Montenegro.

Today, the 100 perper coins are considered to be the finest examples of Montenegrin coinage. It is not known how many 100 perper coins have been preserved but numismatists generally agree that around 150 specimens still exist, including those stored in the museum collections of the Hermitage, the American Numismatic Society, the British Museum, the Prada and the Vienna Canton. Several are believed to be kept in private collections in Montenegro while two gold 100 perper coins adorn the collection of the Central Bank of Montenegro. At auctions, these coins reach a value of 20 to 35 thousand euros, depending on their condition.

== Banknotes ==
1 perper banknote issued in 1912

Banknotes were issued in 1912 by the treasury in denominations of 1, 2, 5, 10, 50 and 100 perpera. In 1914, the government issued three series of notes, in denominations of 1, 2, 5, 10, 20, 50 and 100 perpera. During the Austrian occupation during World War I, government notes of the second and third series were overprinted by the military government district commands. In 1917, the Austrian army issued convertible vouchers denominated in perpera, perpera coins (Münzperper) and Kronen, with 2 perpera = 1 coin perper = 1 Krone.

== See also ==
- Hyperpyron, Byzantine coin
- Montenegrin perun, the currency that was planned for introduction in Montenegro by Petar II Petrović Njegoš in 1851
- Ragusan perpera, currency of the historical Republic of Ragusa
- Serbian perper under Tsar Dušan
- Bank of Montenegro, intended as a bank of issue but which never practically assumed the role
