= Podgorička banka =

Bank of Montenegro

Podgorička Banka was a historical bank in Podgorica, Montenegro.

== Overview ==
Logo from the time of Société Générale ownership

Founded in 1906 as Podgorička banka (lit. 'Bank of Podgorica'), it offered services in corporate and retail banking.

In December 2005, French banking group Société Générale acquired a majority stake in Podgorička banka for €14 million. The Societe Generale bank Montenegro (full name: Societe Generale Montenegro AD, MNSE: POBA) operated in independent Montenegro. The bank provides a range of depository and lending services, which include checking accounts, savings accounts, money market accounts, commercial loans, consumer loans and construction, mortgage loans, safety deposit boxes, VISA credit cards, Western Union services and an ATM network.

The bank conducted its services through a network of 20 branches - seven in and around Podgorica, as well as one in each of the following towns: Danilovgrad, Cetinje, Ulcinj, Bar, Budva, Kotor, Tivat, Igalo, Nikšić, Kolašin, Bijelo Polje, Berane and Rožaje.

The bank changed its name to Societe Generale Bank Montenegro on May 25, 2012.

In February 2019, Societe Generale Bank Montenegro was sold to OTP Group and was again branded Podgorička Banka. On December 11, 2020, the final absorption of Podgorička banka by CKB Banka became effective, thus combining the two Montenegrin subsidiaries of the OTP group into a single entity.

== See also ==
- Bank of Montenegro
- List of banks in Montenegro

== Sources ==
- Official Site
- Njegoskij Fund Network: La Société Générale prend le contrôle de Podgoricka Banka a.d. (fr)
- Njegoskij Fund Network: Diplomatic clippings on the acquisition of Podgoricka Banka a.d.
- Njegoskij Fund Network: Official report on the privatization of Podgoricka Banka a.d.
- Njegoskij Fund Network: Podgoricka Banka will not suffer from the "Société Générale affair" in France
