= Irena Radović =

Montenegrin diplomat and banker

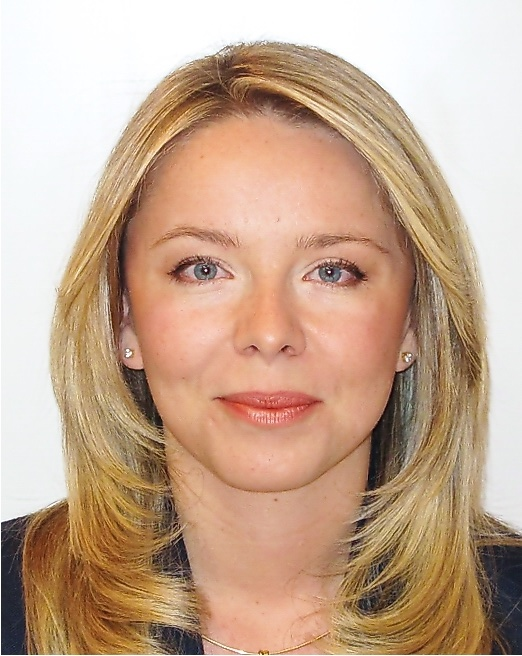

Governor of the Central Bank of Montenegro
- Incumbent
- Assumed office December 2023
- Preceded by: Milojica Dakić

Personal details
- Born: 21 April 1978 (age 48) Podgorica, Yugoslavia
- Education: University of Montenegro; University of Cambridge

Irena Radović is a Montenegrin economist, diplomat and civil servant. She was appointed governor of the Central Bank of Montenegro in December 2023.

She has served as Montenegro's ambassador to several countries, lectured in international economics at several universities, was Deputy Minister of Foreign Affairs in 2007, and represented Montenegro in various international political and cultural organizations. From March 2017 to July 2018, she was Vice-Governor of the Central Bank of Montenegro. She was appointed member of the Board of the Investment and Development Fund (IDF) of Montenegro in December 2020 and elected executive director in January 2021 for four years.

Her economics, diplomacy, and international relations expertise have made her a prominent figure in Montenegrin public service.

== Early life and education ==
Radović was born in Podgorica on 21 April 1978. She graduated from the University of Montenegro, Faculty of Economics in 2000 with the first-class honours BA in International Economics and Business. She received the "19th December" Award in 1999 and the Annual Award of Excellence of the State University of Montenegro in 2000. Radović holds an MPhil. in International Relations from the University of Cambridge, King's College, in the United Kingdom (2002) and a master's degree in economics from the Consortium for Research and Continuing Education in Economics (CORIPE) in Italy (2003). She earned her Ph.D. in Economics from the University of Montenegro in 2009.

As a Chevening scholar, she obtained a master's degree in international relations from the University of Cambridge in the UK in 2002. She also earned a master's degree in economic sciences from the Consortium for Research and Education in Applied Economics in Italy in 2000.

Radović is fluent in English, French and Italian, and speaks Spanish, Albanian and German.

== Academic career ==
Ms. Radović started her professional career in 2000 as an Teaching Assistant at the Faculty of Economics in Podgorica. Radović has been involved in teaching international economics, globalization of world trade, and EU monetary economics.

== Professional career ==
Radović began her professional career in 2000 at the Ministry of Foreign Affairs of Montenegro while simultaneously working at the Faculty of Economics in Podgorica.

She was appointed the Head of British Office and the representative of the British Government in Montenegro in 2003. Following Montenegro's proclamation of independence in 2006, she served as the Deputy to Her Majesty's Ambassador in Montenegro until February 2007, when she was affiliated with All Souls College of the University of Oxford, United Kingdom, until July 2007, when she was appointed the Deputy Minister of Foreign Affairs of Montenegro.

In October 2010, Radović was appointed as the Ambassador of Montenegro to the Republic of France and the non-resident ambassador to the Principality of Monaco and the Principality of Andorra. She also served as ambassador and the permanent representative of Montenegro to the UNESCO, member of the executive board of UNESCO in the period 2011-2015 and the vice-president of the General Conference of UNESCO over the period 2011–2013.

In the period 2011–2015, she was the personal representative of the President of Montenegro in the Permanent Council of the International Organization of Francophonie (OIF), the permanent delegate of Montenegro in the Bureau International des Expositions (BIE), and represented Montenegro in other international organizations based in Paris - OECD, OIV, OIE, BIPM, and Eutelsat.

Irena P. Radović was appointed the Vice Governor of the Central Bank of Montenegro responsible for banking supervision pursuant to the decision of the Parliament of Montenegro as of March 2017. She initially joined the Bank in October 2016 as an Advisor to the Governor for Banking Supervision. In addition to banking supervision Ms. Radović was responsible for the supervision of non-banking financial institutions and financial consumer protection. In her capacity of Deputy Governor of the Central Bank she was a member of the national Financial Stability Council, an ex-officio Member of the Central Bank Council and alternate chairperson of the Investment Committee.

Since December 2018 until her appointment to the position of executive director of the Investment and Development Fund of Montenegro, she was consultant for the Financial Markets International Inc. on the United States Agency for International Development (USAID) project of reform of the financial system in Bosnia and Herzegovina, with focus on strengthening the capacity for banking supervision in both entities of Bosnia and Herzegovina (BiH), introducing FINREP and assisting efforts to bring financial supervision in BiH in line with EU standards.

== Governor of the Central Bank of Montenegro ==
In December 2023, Irena P. Radović was appointed as the Governor of the Central Bank of Montenegro and member of the CBCG Council, making her the first woman to hold this position. She was elected by the Montenegrin Assembly with 58 votes in favor and 13 against.

Radović's nomination came from Montenegro's President, Jakov Milatović, who emphasized the need to reform the Central Bank's image and strengthen it for Montenegro's journey towards European Union membership. Her appointment is seen as a strategic move to revitalize the Central Bank's role and reputation at a crucial time in Montenegro's path towards greater integration with European institutions.

== Awards and honors ==
In April 2014, Radović received the Gold Medal and Charter of the Universal League for Public Good in Paris.

Radović was awarded the Gold Medal of the Universal League of Public Welfare in the headquarters of the Republican Guard of the Republic of France in April 2014

Prince Albert II of Monaco awarded Radović the Sovereign Knight Grand Cross with Collar of the Order of Saint Charles, the highest award of the Principality of Monaco of the Order of Grimaldi bestowed on individuals or states.

In November 2022, she received the Legion of Honor, France's highest decoration, becoming the first and only recipient of this honor in Montenegro since the restoration of independence.

In October 2023, at the G100 World Economic Forum (WEF 2023) in London, she was elected as a G100 global leader and chair of the "Financial Inclusion and Corporate Board Readiness" Group.
