= BCR Chișinău =

Moldovan bank

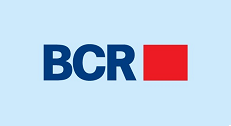

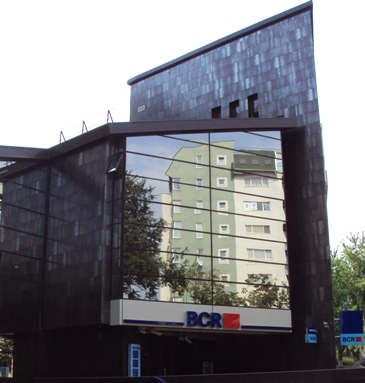
- BCR headquarters in 2011
- Company type: Private
- Founded: 1998; 28 years ago
- Defunct: 2025; 1 year ago
- Headquarters: Chișinău, Moldova
- Key people: Juan Luis Martin Ortigosa (Chief Executive Officer), Natalia Codreanu (Executive Director Sales and Business Development), Iurie Rusu (Executive Director Operations and IT)
- Products: Commercial banking, investment banking, private banking, asset management
- Total assets: 2,971 million MDL (2023)
- Website: www.bcr.md

BCR Chișinău was a Moldavian bank that provides services to individual and business customers and is headquartered in Chișinău.

It was a subsidiary of Romanian Banca Comercială Română, member of Erste Group until January 2024 when the Moldovian subsidiary was acquired by Moldovian Victoriabank. Victoriabank said that the bank would be fully absorbed by February 2025.

== History ==
BCR Chișinău started its activity on 22 October 1998 as a universal bank serving both companies and individuals, with a shareholder's capital of 24 million MDL, which was increased further to 728.13 million MDL. It was the first banks with foreign capital that was a members of an international financial group in Moldova. By 2014, the banks network comprised 2 branches, 1 agency and 40 ATMs. The shareholder of BCR Chișinău was Banca Comercială Română, the biggest financial institution in Romania by total assets.

== Products ==
For individuals, BCR Chișinău offers current account services, saving instruments, cards and attached services, loans, currency transfers, foreign exchange, internet banking, and other services.

For businesses and organizations, BCR Chișinău offers financing, investment instruments, trade finance, cross-border products, current operations, cards and attached services, Internet Banking, products for SMEs, forex operations, forward on exchange rate, other services.

== Bank management ==
BCR Chișinău management is organized on two levels: executive management – Executive Committee, formed of 3 executive members and supervision – Supervisory Board, formed of 5 members, nonexecutives (are not involved in current company decisions).

The executive committee reports to the supervisory board and informs periodically about decisions taken.
