= Sogebank =

Haitian commercial bank

Société Générale Haïtienne de Banque, S.A.
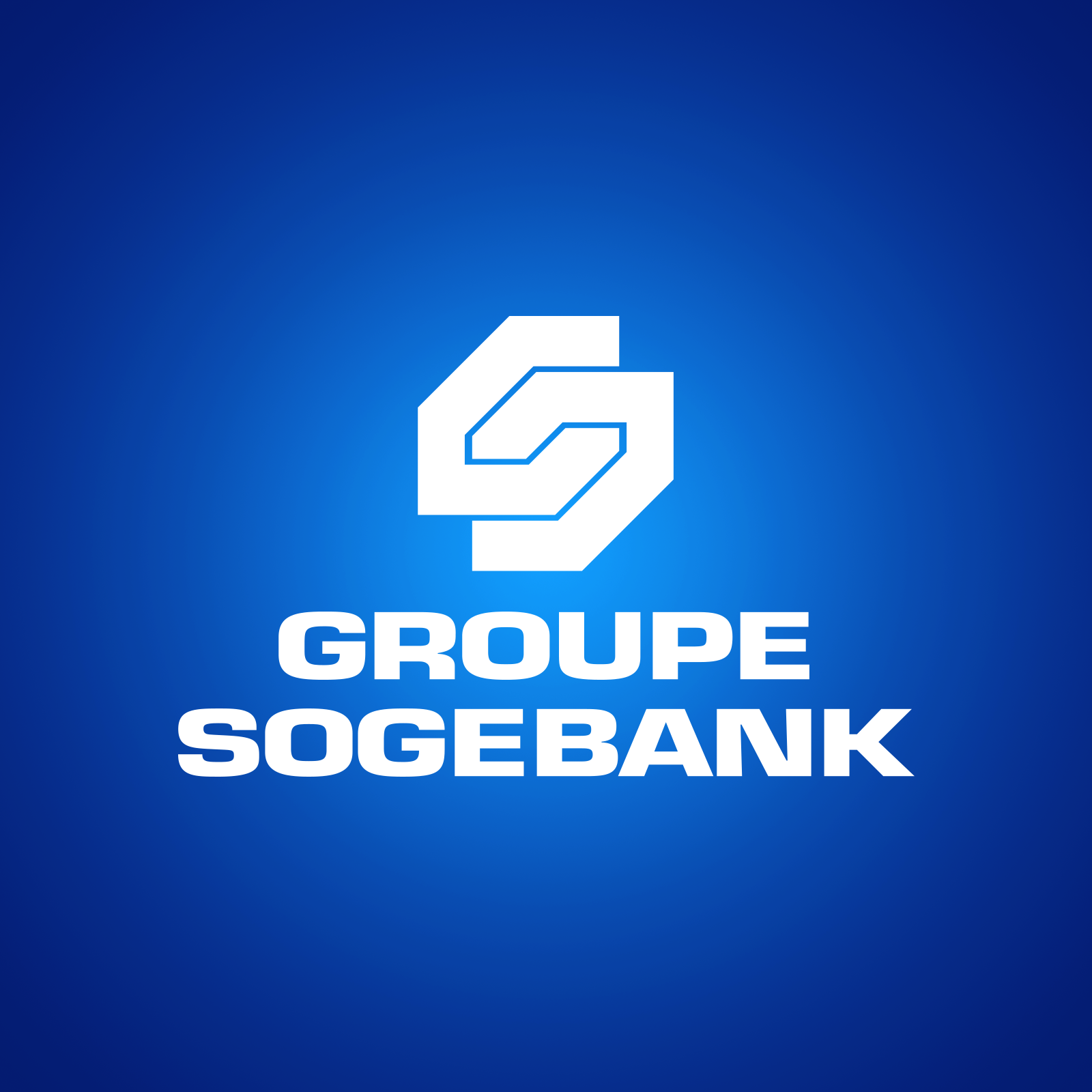
- Company type: Private
- Industry: Financial services
- Founded: April 26, 1986; 40 years ago
- Headquarters: Autoroute de Delmas; Port-au-Prince, Haiti
- Key people: Robert Moscoso (Chairman and CEO)
- Revenue: US$ 81.1 million (2016)
- Net income: US$ 16.5 million (2015)
- Total assets: US$ 1.098 billion (2016)
- Number of employees: 2,307 (2016)
- Website: sogebank.com

Sogebank, formally known as Société Générale Haïtienne de Banque, S.A. (Haitian Banking Corporation), is one of Haiti's three largest commercial banks. It was formed on April 26, 1986, when the Royal Bank of Canada sold its Haiti-based operations to a group of Haitian investors. It acquired Banque intercontinentale de Commerce (BIDC) in November 1998 and the failing Banque de Promotion commerciale et industrielle (Promobank) in September 2006.

Sogebank currently has 42 branches located throughout the country in the major cities as well as several solely in Port-au-Prince. The main Sogebank building is located in the capital on the main road of Delmas. Nowadays, the Sogebank Group includes seven subsidiaries each concerning a separate branch of banking transactions and a foundation:

- Sogebank (Commercial bank)
- Sogebel (Building society)
- Sogesol (Microcredit)
- Sogecarte (Credit card issuer)
- SogeXpress (Money transfer)
- Sogefac (Consumer finance)
- SogeAssurance (Insurance)
- Fondation Sogebank (Philanthropy)

== Debit card outage ==
In late 2024, Sogebank suspended international transactions on its Visa debit cards, leaving thousands of customers unable to access funds for overseas and online payments for several weeks. The bank attributed the disruption to service improvements, while reports indicated that technical and security issues, including cyber incidents, may have contributed to the prolonged outage, which continued into early January 2025 without a clear timeline for resolution.
