= CKB Banka =

Former bank in Montenegro

CKB Banka, Formerly Crnogorska Komercijalna Banka (lit. 'Commercial Bank of Montenegro)', is a bank in Montenegro, established in 1997 by private-sector initiative. It was acquired in 2006 by OTP Group.

== Overview ==
CKB was established in 1997 by a consortium of 28 small and medium-sized companies. Originally focused on small and medium businesses, the bank later expanded its services to include corporate and personal banking. By the end of 2005, it was the largest bank in Montenegro.

OTP Group acquired 100 percent of CKB's shares in 2006, for 105 million euro.

CKB Banka had 34 branches, operated 74 ATMs, had over 268,000 customers, and 423 employees at the end of 2007.

In August 2019, CKB Banka announced the acquisition of a 90.56 percent stake in Societe Generale Bank Montenegro, by then the country's fourth-largest bank. The transaction was completed on 11 December 2020 and created Montenegro's largest bank in terms of ATM network, number of branches, and loan and deposit portfolios.

== See also ==
- List of banks in Montenegro
