= Montenegrin perun =

Proposed currency of Montenegro

Modern reconstruction

Obverse, containing Ouroboros

Reverse

The perun (Cyrillic: Перун, older spelling: Перунъ) was the currency that was planned for introduction in Montenegro by Petar II Petrović Njegoš in 1851. However, he died the same year, and Montenegro later used the Austro-Hungarian krone until the 1906 introduction of the perper by Nicholas I of Montenegro. It was named after Perun, whom Njegoš considered to be the supreme god of Slavic mythology. If introduced, one Perun would have had equal value to two thalers.

== See also ==
- Montenegrin perper
