= Bank of Montenegro =

Former bank of issue

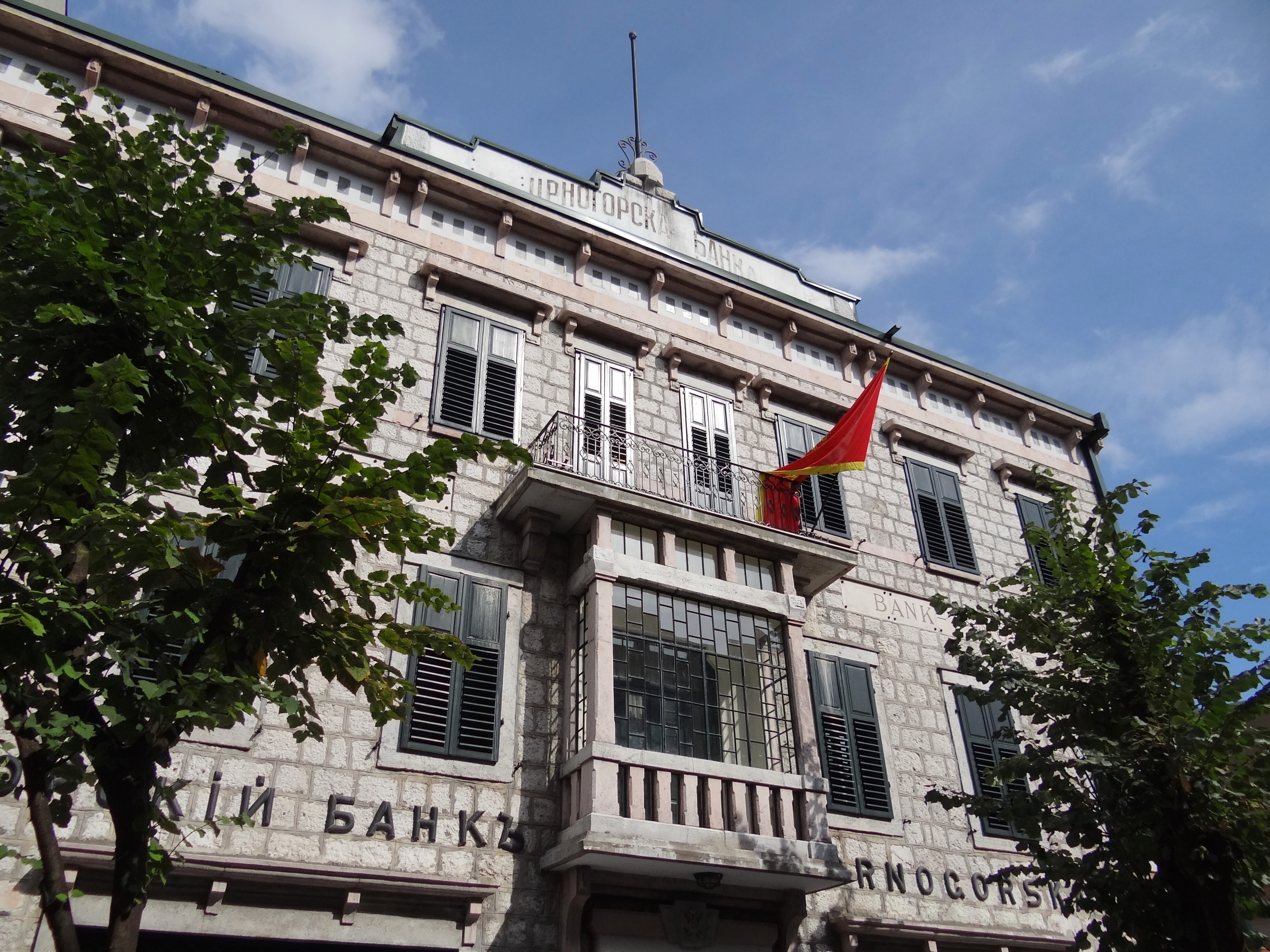
Former headquarters of the Bank of Montenegro in Cetinje, converted into the Montenegro Money Museum

The Bank of Montenegro or Montenegrin Bank (Serbo-Croatian: Crnogorska banka) was a bank in Cetinje, the capital of the Principality then Kingdom of Montenegro. In existence from 1906 to 1918, it was intended as a bank of issue, but that ambition was never put in practice as the Montenegrin government remained directly in charge of the country's fledgling monetary policy.

== Overview ==
The Bank of Montenegro was established by princely decree of Nikola Petrović-Njegoš on 11 April 1906, at a time when the main currency in circulation in Montenegro was the Austrian krone, complemented by other European currencies. The bank was not an independent central bank with authority over monetary policy, however, and the government retained the capacity to mint coins, which it contracted out to the Austro-Hungarian Mint in Vienna. In 1909, the country's money was officially named the Montenegrin perper. By then, as the relations between Montenegro and Austria-Hungary had deteriorated, the minting of new coins was entrusted to the Privileged National Bank of the Kingdom of Serbia, which in turn contracted it out to a bank in Paris. Due to poor quality, however, the Montenegrin government reverted to minting in Vienna for its next issuance in 1910. The government also directly issued paper money during the Balkan Wars and World War I, between 1912 and 1916 when Montenegro was occupied by Austria-Hungary.

In 1918, the National Bank of Serbia took over monetary policy for the newly established Yugoslavia, which absorbed Montenegro, and was soon renamed the National Bank of the Kingdom of Serbs, Croats and Slovenes. The Bank of Montenegro ceased its activity at that time.

The Bank of Montenegro operated from a house erected by architect Miloš Lepetić in the late 19th century, in a leafy area of Cetinje. The building was expanded and made more representative of the bank's prominence in 1910, the same year as the establishment of the monarchy. The building was repurposed in 2012 as the Money Museum of the Central Bank of Montenegro.

== See also ==
- Prva banka Crne Gore
- Podgorička banka
- Bank of Albania
- List of central banks
