= Prva Banka Crne Gore =

Montenegrin bank

Prva banka Crne Gore AD
- Company type: Private
- Industry: Financial services
- Founded: May 3, 1901; 125 years ago
- Headquarters: Podgorica, Montenegro
- Key people: Tarik Telacevic (CEO)
- Products: Banking
- Revenue: € 18,90 million (2021)
- Net income: € 338.000 (2021)
- Owner: Aco Đukanović (41,46%)
- Number of employees: 220 (2023)
- Website: www.prvabankacg.com

Prva banka Crne Gore AD is a Montenegrin bank. Formerly known as Nikšićka banka AD, the bank was renamed in March 2007. Prva banka CG assumes continuity from a bank, existing under various forms of ownership, that was founded in 1901.

== History ==
In 1901, Niksic Saving Bank became the first bank in Montenegro. Its name is derived from the city where it was founded. Beginning a more progressive society in the city was also driving business growth. The founding of the Montenegrin brewery "Onogost" in 1896, and the First Niksic Saving Bank in 1901, also meant the beginnings of industrial and banking capital. This was a key moment in the further development of Niksic industry and society.

The promoter of the First Niksic Saving Bank (originally called First Niksic Money Cooperative) was Joco Petrovic, a renowned finance expert. At the incorporation general meeting on 6 January 1901, an interim board of directors included traders, craftsmen, and aristocrats, voted in favour of a document titled "Saving Bank Rules". On 5 March 1901, King Nikola I Petrovic gave his official support to the newly founded First Niksic Saving Bank, and the president of the State Council at the time, Bozo Petrovic, endorsed the saving bank rules.

In 1908, the Saving Bank opened new branches in Velimlje and Savnik, and after the Balkan Wars in 1912-1913 it opened another in Pljevlja. However, its success was somewhat disturbed by the state's decision to protect the indebted population during the war with the Law on Extending Loan Terms for Citizens.

On 2 March 1914, Saving Bank changed its name to Niksic Credit Bank, but operated under this name only very briefly, until the First World War began later the same year. Niksic Credit Bank resumed operations in 1923 when political and social tensions and currency fluctuations had diminished. After it again suspended operations during the Second World War, it continued its banking activity late towards the end of 1944, within the system of the National Bank of Yugoslavia.

With the separation between the National Bank of Yugoslavia and the National Accounting Service, a new saving bank was formed in Niksic. To support the regional development in Montenegro, in 1961 Communal Bank for Niksic, Savnik and Pluzine was formed. After its transformation, in 1966 the bank existed under a new name: Commercial Bank of Niksic.

In 1967, Montenegro’s banking system was integrated into the Investment Bank Titograd. The Commercial Bank of Niksic became a branch of the new system and maintained that status until 1978. In the same year, in line with the new transformation of the banking system, Niksic Bank was formed, still within the Investment Bank of Titograd, as the main bank in Montenegro. Niksic Bank had significant independence: it constituted its corporate governance and played an important part in investment and other activities of the regional industry.

In 1990, once again, there was a consolidation of almost all banks in Montenegro into a united system, Montenegrobanka Titograd. At that point, Niksic Bank lost its independence, although it kept the main branch status. In that period, the absence of active support for regional development was a result of moving the financial decision-making elsewhere. This also stopped the further growth of the bank.

After a long transformation of the banking system, on 28 February 1992, at the bank’s general meeting a decision was made to leave the Montenegrobanka system and operate independently under the name Niksic Bank dd Niksic. In June 1995, its founders and shareholders transformed it into Niksic Bank ad Niksic, owned by its shareholders.

This name associated the bank with its local origins and character, and in 2007 a complete change in its visual identity took place. The bank became Prva Banka Crne Gore (First Bank of Montenegro) – founded in 1901. With these changes, the intention was to maintain the bank's tradition, but also promote its activities in all parts of Montenegro. In addition, the bank’s headquarters moved to a new location in Podgorica.

== Controversies ==
It is alleged that the privatization of the bank in 2007 gave the family and friends of the Prime Minister of Montenegro, Milo Đukanović, a controlling interest on favorable terms. In 2008 the bank, on the verge of collapse, received a €44 million state-funded bailout. A classified audit conducted by PricewaterhouseCoopers in late 2009 and early 2010 showed mismanagement of the bank.

== See also ==
- Bank of Montenegro
- List of banks in Yugoslavia
