= OTP Bank (Moldova) =

OTP Bank, Moldova
- Company type: Private
- Industry: Financial services
- Founded: 1990
- Headquarters: Chișinău, Moldova
- Area served: Moldova
- Key people: Bogdan Spuză (CEO)
- Products: Retail, private, investment and corporate banking; insurance; investment management
- Owner: OTP Bank Nyrt.
- Website: www.otpbank.md

Present on the local market since 4 July 1990, bank was founded on the initiative of few entrepreneurs with professional experience in the financial and banking field, which set up an independent bank, oriented towards serving the SME sector.

In 2007, the majority shareholder of the bank became Groupe Société Générale, which contributed to the development of the product portfolio and the growth of performance indicators for twelve years, consolidating a professional team and reaching the top position in the financial system of the country.

On July 25, 2019, OTP Bank Nyrt has acquired the majority stake 96.69% held by Groupe Société Générale held in BC "Mobiasbanca - Groupe Société Générale" S.A. The new official name of the bank is OTP Bank.

== History ==
Main historical milestones:

- 1990, July 4 – was set up as an independent bank with the legal status of Limited Liability Company
- 1995 – One of the first bank allowed on the securities' market
- 1996 – One of the first bank to benefit from credit lines granted by International Financial Organizations
- 1996 – The Bank changed its legal status to Joint Stock Company
- 1996 – Member of SWIFT international payment system
- 1997 – 32.45% of share capital was acquired by the investment fund Development Capital Corporation, who remained to be the major shareholder of the Bank (63.68%)
- 2002 – Member of the “Europay International” payment system
- 2003 – The automatic banking system implementation
- 2005 – First bank to launch a consumer-loan and a credit card
- 2007 – The Bank has been purchased by Groupe Société Générale (95,35%)
- 2008 – The bank changes the official name to CB “Mobiasbanca – Groupe Société Générale” S.A.
- 2008 – Capital increase of the Bank and coming of new strategic shareholders (BRD – Groupe Société Générale) and EBRD (European Bank for Reconstruction and Development). The share of Societe Generale decreased as a result of this transaction and as of the end of 2008 effectively represents 67.85%.
- 2008 – Principal member of MasterCard
- 2009 – Implementation of telerecovery service
- 2009 – MasterCard certification of cards with microchip
- 2011 – Simplu Finance project launch
- 2011 – First collection of cards created exclusively for women Chérie Chérie
- 2012 – Launch of the Universal Desk concept
- 2012 – Launch of new Call-Center (Contactell)
- 2012 – MobiasInfo sms messaging service launch
- 2012 – Launch of MasterCard Secure Code - secured payments over the Internet
- 2013 – International certificate ISO 9001: 2008 "Quality Management Systems. Requirements", being the first bank in the country holding such a certificate
- 2013 – IP telephony implementation
- 2014 – New range of bank cards in the international payment system MasterCard - banking card endowed with EMV (embedded chip)
- 2014 – Opening of the new Training Centre and Branch School
- 2016 – Launch of VISA cards
- 2017 – First Mortgage Center opened in Moldova
- 2019 – Purchase by OTP Bank
- 2020 – 30th anniversary of the Bank
- 2021 – the Bank finalizes the rebranding process and becomes OTP Bank S.A. (OTP Bank, Moldova).
