= Central Bank of Montenegro =

State-owned bank in Montenegro

Central Bank of Montenegro Centralna Banka Crne Gore

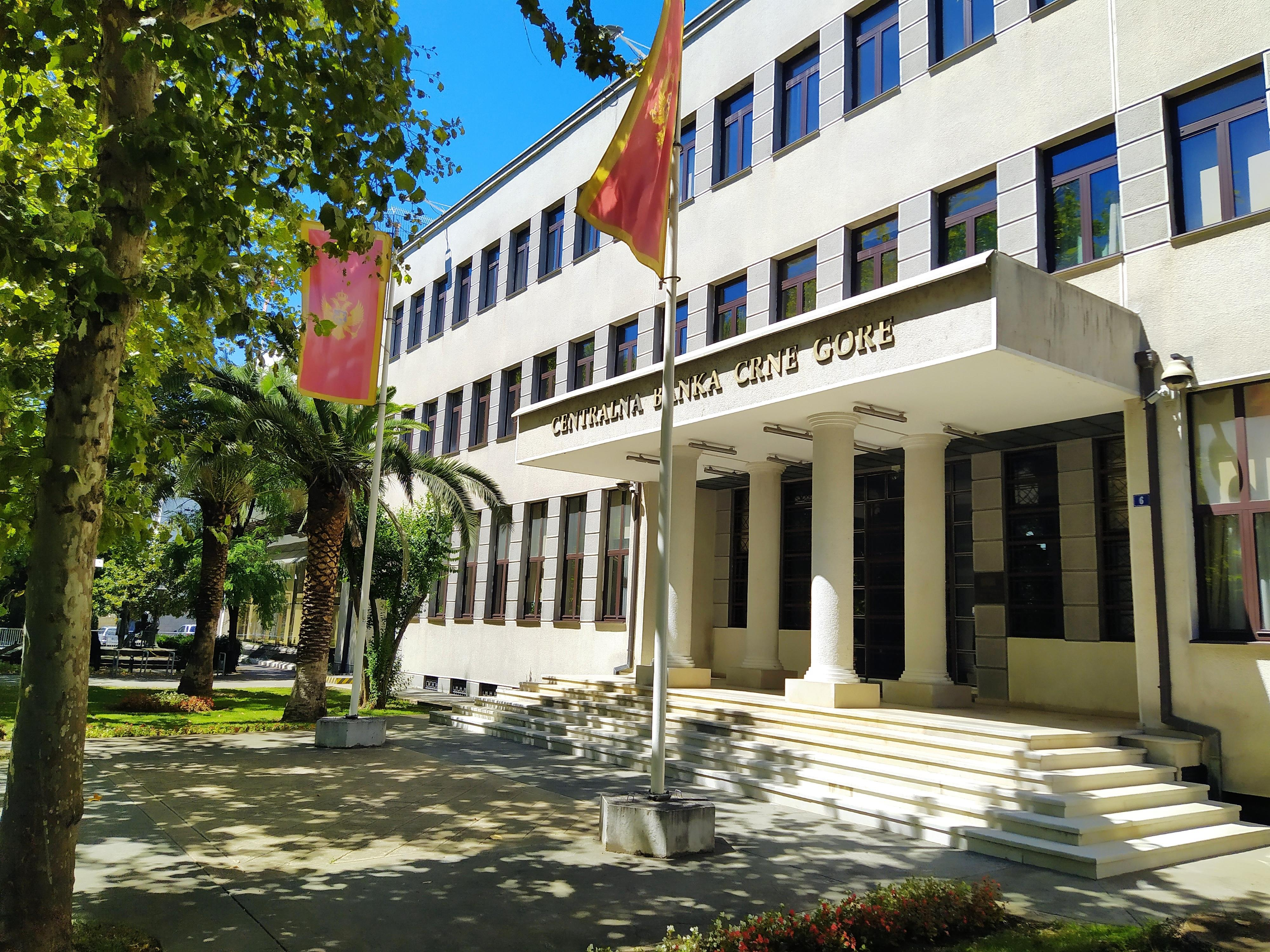
- Central bank of: Montenegro
- Headquarters: Podgorica
- Established: March 15, 2001
- Ownership: 100% state ownership
- Governor: Irena Radović
- Reserves: 1.7 billion USD
- Preceded by: National Bank of Yugoslavia
- Succeeded by: European Central Bank ^{1}
- Website: Official website
- ^{1} Many policies are managed de facto by the ECB/eurosystem, even if the bank is not part of the Eurosystem or the European System of Central Banks.

The Central Bank of Montenegro (Montenegrin: Centralna Banka Crne Gore, or CBCG) is the central bank of Montenegro. Montenegro does not issue its own currency, and unilaterally adopted the euro in 2002. The stated mission of the central bank is to establish and maintain a sound banking system and monetary policy.

The Central Bank of Montenegro was established by the Parliament of Montenegro in November 2000, when the country was part of a political union of Federal Republic of Yugoslavia. With its establishment, the Republic of Montenegro obtained an independent authority responsible for monetary policy, and establishment and maintenance of sound banking system and efficient payment system operations.

The Central Bank of Montenegro does not participate in the European System of Central Banks or in ECB meetings. Instead, it tracks ECB policy, making the latter the de facto central bank of Montenegro for monetary policy purposes. One of the main proclaimed goals of the Central Bank of Montenegro is the accession of the country to the Eurozone. Montenegro does not mint, issue or print euro coins or notes and imports them from other countries that are part of the Eurozone.

== History ==
The National Bank of Montenegro (Serbian: Narodna banka Crne Gore, NBCG) was originally established in 1971 as part of the System of National Banks which replaced the National Bank of Yugoslavia (NBJ) as Yugoslavia's collective monetary authority. In 1993, the Yugoslav Wars resulted in recentralization of the monetary framework in the areas controlled by Serbia, and the NBCG lost its independent legal identity to become a mere branch of the NBJ in the Federal Republic of Yugoslavia.

In the later 1990s, Serbian–Montenegrin unionism gradually lost influence, especially after Milo Đukanović's victory's in the 1997 presidential election, the Kosovo War in 1998-99, and the overthrow of Slobodan Milošević in September-October 2000. On 2 November 1999, Montenegro designated the Deutsche Mark (by then already defined in terms of the euro) as official currency alongside the Yugoslav dinar. On 13 November 2000, Montenegro announced it would drop the dinar altogether and adopted the Deutsche Mark as its only currency, effective January 2001. The Central Bank of Montenegro was established by the Law on the Central Bank in November 2000 and began operations on 15 March 2001, steering the country's monetary and financial policy even though it is not itself involved in money creation.

The Constitution of Montenegro, adopted in 2007, defined the Central Bank as "an independent organization responsible for the monetary and financial stability and functioning of the banking system". In fulfilling the responsibilities assigned to the Constitution, the Bank, among other things: performs supervision of the banking system; performs and controls inter-bank payment operations in the country and abroad; acts as a fiscal agent, a banker and a state advisor, and performs regular macroeconomic analyzes, giving recommendations to the Government for Economic Policy. One of the Central Bank of Montenegro's strategic objectives of the CBM is to join the Eurosystem.

== Operations ==
The CBM is not an issuing bank, and it has the following powers and responsibilities in the performance of its functions determined by law:

- To issue and withdraw licenses to banks and financial institutions, to regulate and supervise their operation and conduct bankruptcy and liquidation proceedings over banks and financial institutions in the Republic.
- To give loans from its reserves to licensed banks in the Republic, under the conditions determined by law.
- To prescribe and undertake measures, and regulate and supervise payment system, settlement and inter-bank clearing in the Republic.
- To carry out and supervise the domestic and international payment system.
- To act as a banker, advisor and fiscal agent of the bodies and authorities of the Republic.
- To buy and sell currencies and precious metals on its own behalf or on behalf of the Republic.
- To buy and sell securities on the secondary market issued by the Republic, European Union member states, or other states designated in the Central Bank regulation.
- To make regular macroeconomic analyses, including monetary, fiscal, financial and balance of payment studies of the Republic economy, and to give recommendations in the area of economic policy to the Republic.
- To prepare and participate in preparation of laws and other regulations in monetary, foreign currency and banking system, in accordance with international standards, including determination of reserves for various types of deposits.
- To provide banking services in favor of foreign governments, foreign central banks as well as international organizations and other international institutions in which Central Bank of the Republic are members.
- To take deposits from banks, state agencies and organizations.
- To establish and maintain accounts for the needs of state bodies and organizations, local and foreign banks, international financial institutions and donor organizations.
- To prescribe manner of operations for dealers and banks in foreign exchange transactions, set limits on foreign exchange positions of dealers and banks and perform their control.
- May be owner and manage one or more payment systems, including one real time gross payment system.
- May manage a real time net payment system.
- To provide banknotes and coins in quantities appropriate to satisfy the needs of financial transactions.
- To perform other operations determined by this and other laws.

== Leadership ==
The current Governor of the Central bank of Montenegro is Irena Radović, as of 15 December 2023. The position of the Governor was created after Montenegro achieved independence in 2006. The holder of the office is confirmed by vote in Parliament.

- Ljubiša Krgović, March 2001 – November 2010
- Radoje Žugić, November 2010 – December 2012 and October 2016 – December 2023
- Milojica Dakić, January 2013 – October 2016
- Irena Radović, December 2023 – present

== See also ==
- Economy of Montenegro
- Montenegro and the euro
- List of banks in Montenegro
- List of central banks
- List of financial supervisory authorities by country
