= OTP Bank =

Hungarian financial services provider

OTP Bank Nyrt.

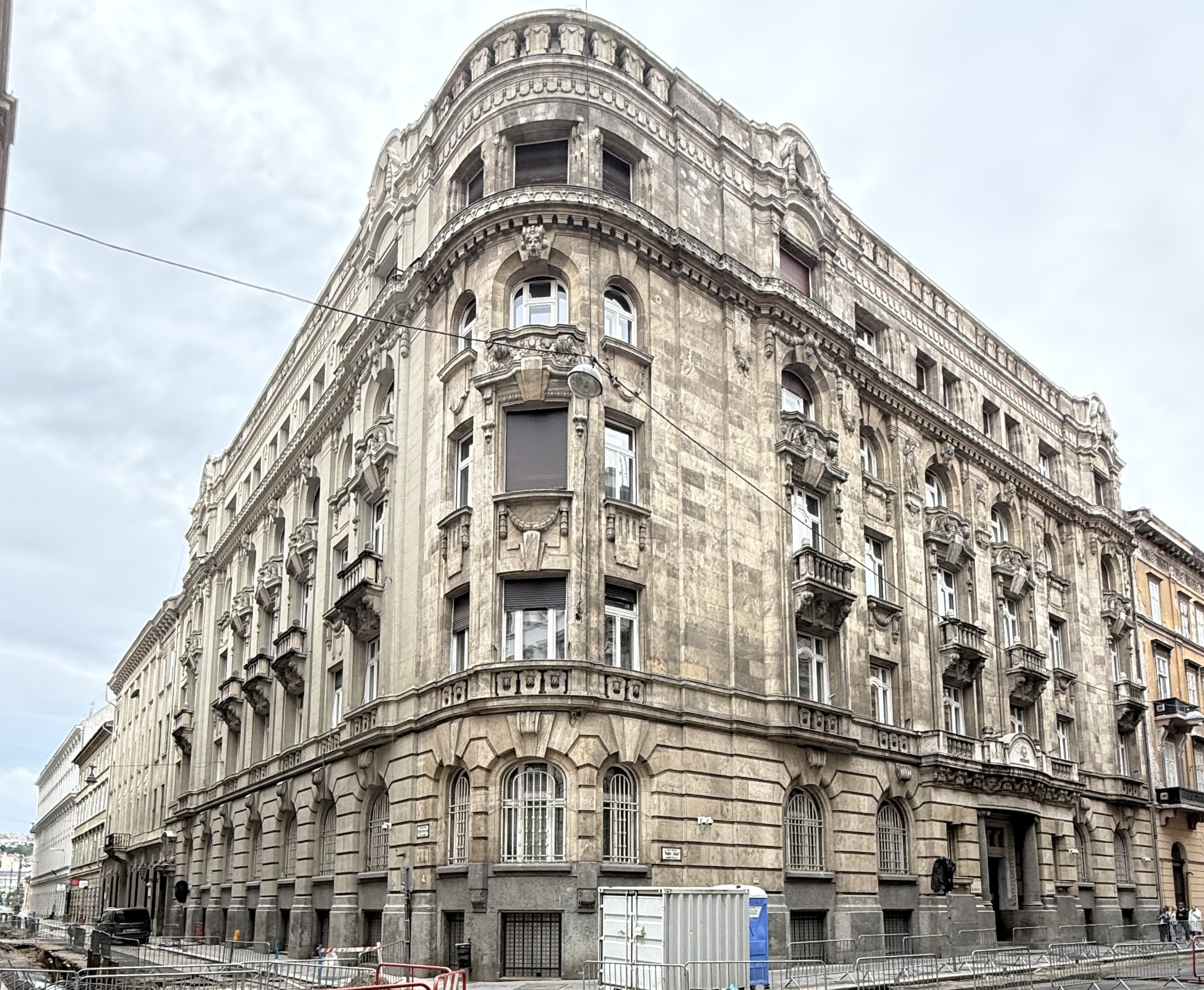
- OTP registered office, Nádor utca 16, Budapest
- Type: Public
- Traded as: BPSE: OTP; BUX Component; CETOP20 Component
- Industry: Banking, Financial services
- Founded: 1839; 187 years ago Creation of First National Savings Bank of Pest 1 March 1949; 77 years ago established as OTP Bank
- Headquarters: Budapest, Hungary
- Area served: Central and Eastern Europe, Central Asia
- Key people: Sándor Csányi (Chairman & CEO)
- Products: Consumer banking, corporate banking, credit cards, finance and insurance, foreign currency exchange, investment banking, mortgage loans, private banking, private equity, wealth management
- Revenue: ▲US$4.1 billion (2025)
- Operating income: ▼US$2.07 billion (2025)
- Net income: ▼US$1.8 billion (2025)
- Total assets: ▲US$54.05 billion (2025)
- Total equity: ▼US$14.5 billion (2025)
- Number of employees: 40,845 (2025)
- Subsidiaries: DSK Bank, CKB Banka, see full list in OTP Group section
- Website: www.otpbank.hu/portal/en/retail

OTP Bank Group is the largest commercial bank of Hungary and one of the largest independent financial service providers in Central and Eastern Europe, with banking services for private individuals and corporate clients. The OTP Group comprises subsidiaries in the field of insurance, real estate, factoring, leasing and asset management, investment and pension funds. Besides Hungary, OTP Group operates in 10 countries of the region via its subsidiaries: in Albania (Banka OTP Albania SHA), in Bulgaria (DSK Bank), in Croatia (OTP banka d.d.), in Serbia (OTP Banka Srbija), in Slovenia (OTP banka d.d.), in Ukraine (OTP Bank JSC), in Moldova (OTP Bank S.A.), in Montenegro (CKB Banka), in Russia (OAO OTP Bank), and in Uzbekistan (JSCMB Ipoteka Bank).

As of 2026, OTP Group had more than 40,000 employees, 17.5 million clients, over 1,100 branches and its assets amounted to €124 billion. OTP is the largest commercial bank in Hungary with over 25% market share.

OTP stands for Országos Takarék Pénztár (lit. 'Nationwide Savings Bank'), which indicates the original purpose of establishment of the bank. OTP went public in 1995 and has a high free float shareholder structure (55.27% of its shares are hold by foreign shareholders); its largest shareholers are Hungarian MOL Group with 8.57% and French Groupama with 5.10%.

== History ==
The oldest antecedent of OTP Bank was the First National Savings Bank of Pest, established in 1839–1840 and nationalized in 1948. In 1949, the latter's operations were transferred to the newly established Hungarian National Savings Bank Company (Hungarian: Országos Takarékpénztár Nemzeti Vállalat), one of the country's four main financial institutions alongside the Hungarian National Bank, the Hungarian Investment Bank (renamed the State Bank for Development in 1972 and liquidated in 1987), and the Hungarian Foreign Trade Bank. Until 1987 the National Savings Bank was the only retail bank in Hungary. Since 1989 the bank operated as a multi-functional commercial bank with the authorization to provide commercial loans and banking services for banks and import-export transactions.

In 1990, the National Savings Bank became a state-owned joint-stock company with a share capital of HUF 23 billion. Its name was changed to the National Savings and Commercial Bank. Subsequently, non-banking activities were separated from the bank, along with their supporting organisational units. The state lottery was reorganized into a separate state-owned company and OTP Real Estate was established as a subsidiary of the bank.

OTP Bank logo used between 1991 and 2007

OTP Bank's privatization began in the year 1995. As a result of 3 public offers along with the introduction of the bank's shares into the Budapest Stock Exchange the state's ownership in the bank decreased to 25 percent by 1995, then to a single voting preference (golden) share by 1999 (maintained until 2007).

In 1995, OTP purchased Merkantil Bank, created in 1988 mostly as a vehicle finance provider, from its parent K&H Bank. OTP then started an international expansion targeting countries in Central and Eastern Europe, namely in Slovakia (2002), Bulgaria (2003), Romania (2004), Croatia (2005), Ukraine, Russia, Serbia and Montenegro (2006).

In 2008, the French insurance company Groupama acquired OTP's insurance business. As part of the transaction, they resolved to collaborate in strategic points and cross sell their financial and insurance products. Groupama S.A. thus acquired 8% of shares of OTP Group. This transaction allowed OTP to avoid the need of state recapitalization during the 2008 financial crisis; OTP only took liquidity support from the state, entailing temporary government interference in its governance, and was able to repay it fully by 2010.

In April 2014, it was announced that OTP Bank was close to a deal to acquire the Hungarian MKB Bank from German firm BayernLB, which however was not executed. In February 2016, French Axa Bank Europe announced it had entered into an agreement with OTP Bank to sell its Hungarian banking operations, which was considered to be a medium-sized bank in Hungary.

In 2019, OTP Bank entered into an agreement to purchase MobiasBanca of Moldova. The agreement was finalized on 25 July 2019. In 2020, OTP Bank sold its Slovakian subsidiary to KBC which merged OTP Banka Slovensko into ČSOB. In 2021, OTP Bank acquired Slovenian lender NKBM and merged it with its Slovenian unit SKB Bank, thus creating a lender with a market share of around 30%

In March 2022, due to international sanctions during the Russo-Ukrainian War, OTP Bank stopped financing its Russian branch.

On December 12, 2022, in Tashkent, OTP Bank signed an agreement on the privatization of 75% of the Joint-Stock Commercial Mortgage Bank "Mortgage bank". It is planned to close the deal in the first half of 2023, although the amount has not yet been disclosed. 73.41% of the shares in Ipoteka Bank JSCM were acquired from the Uzbekistan government in June 2023.

In 2024, OTP Bank sold its romanian activities to Banca Transilvania for €347.5 million. In July 2026, OTP Bank announced the signature of an agreement to acquire Estonian lender Luminor Bank.

=== Controversy ===
On 5 May 2023, Ukrainian authorities added OTP bank onto its list of international sponsors of the Russo-Ukrainian War, which the bank refuted. The Government of Hungary backed the bank stating that it would block any further EU aid to Ukraine until the bank is withdrawn from the list. The bank was removed from the list in September 2023.

== OTP Group structure ==
=== Hungarian operations ===
The OTP Group provides its financial services in Hungary through several business units :

OTP Bank	Universal Bank
Merkantil Group	Vehicle and asset financing
OTP Mortgage Bank Ltd.	Mortgage Bank
OTP Building Society Ltd.	Savings Bank
OTP Factoring	Factoring, forfeiting
OTP Real Estate Lease	Retail flat leasing
OTP Fund Management	Investment Fund
OTP Real Estate Fund Management	Portfolio Management
OTP Real Estate	Construction and sale of properties
OTP Pension Fund	Pensions
OTP National Health Fund	Health Fund
OTP Travel	Travel Agency

=== Subsidiaries ===
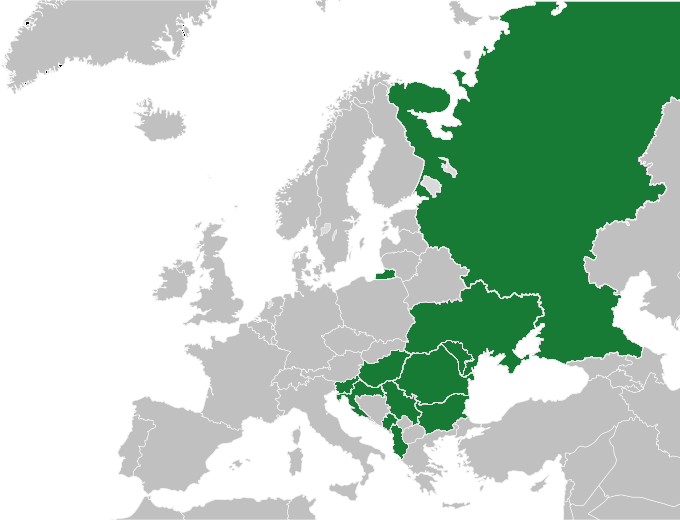
Map of countries with OTP Bank branches marked in green.

In addition to Hugary, OTP Group operates in 10 countries in Central and Eastern Europe, as well as Central Asia, through its subsidiaries.

- Banka OTP Albania (Albania)
- DSK Bank (Bulgaria)
- OTP Banka Hrvatska d.d. Split(Croatia)
- OTP Bank S.A. (Moldova)
- Crnogorska komercijalna banka a.d. (Montenegro)
- Joint Stock Company “OTP Bank” (Russia)
- OTP Banka Srbija a.d. Novi Sad (Serbia)
- OTP banka d.d. (Slovenia)
- Joint-Stock Company OTP Bank (Ukraine)
- Ipoteka-Bank (Uzbekistan)

== Buildings ==
The OTP Group uses three closely located buildings on Nádor utca in central Budapest, respectively at numbers 6, 16, and 21:

- Nádor utca 6, erected 1912-1913 as head office of Magyar-Cseh Iparbank (lit. 'Hungarian-Czech Industrial Bank'), on a design by architects Gyula Haász, Béla Málnai, and Sándor Heidelberg
- Nádor utca 16, erected 1912 as head office of Magyar Agrár- és Járadékbank (lit. 'Hungarian Agrarian and Interest Bank', absorbed in 1926 by the Hungarian-Italian Bank), on a design by Albert Kőrössy and Géza Kiss
- Nádor utca 21, erected 1910-1915 for the Nasici Tanning Company and Steam Sawmill Company, then head office of Ugriai-Nasici Fabank timber company, on a design by Sándor Révész and József Kollár

The building at Nádor utca 16 was attributed to the National Savings Bank in 1951, and remained OTP Bank's legal registered address as of May 2026. OTP initiated the renovation of the building at Nádor utca 21 in 2024.

OTP has fund management and private banking operations in the Bank Center building bordering Liberty Square in Budapest, which from 2015 to 2022 was also the seat of the Budapest Stock Exchange. It also has a branch in the Chemolimpex building in central Budapest, originally erected 1963 on a design by architect Zoltán Gulyás.

In 2022, many OTP Group staff who had been located in scattered buildings across Budapest moved to a state-of-the-art facility in the northern Angyalföld neighborhood of Budapest.

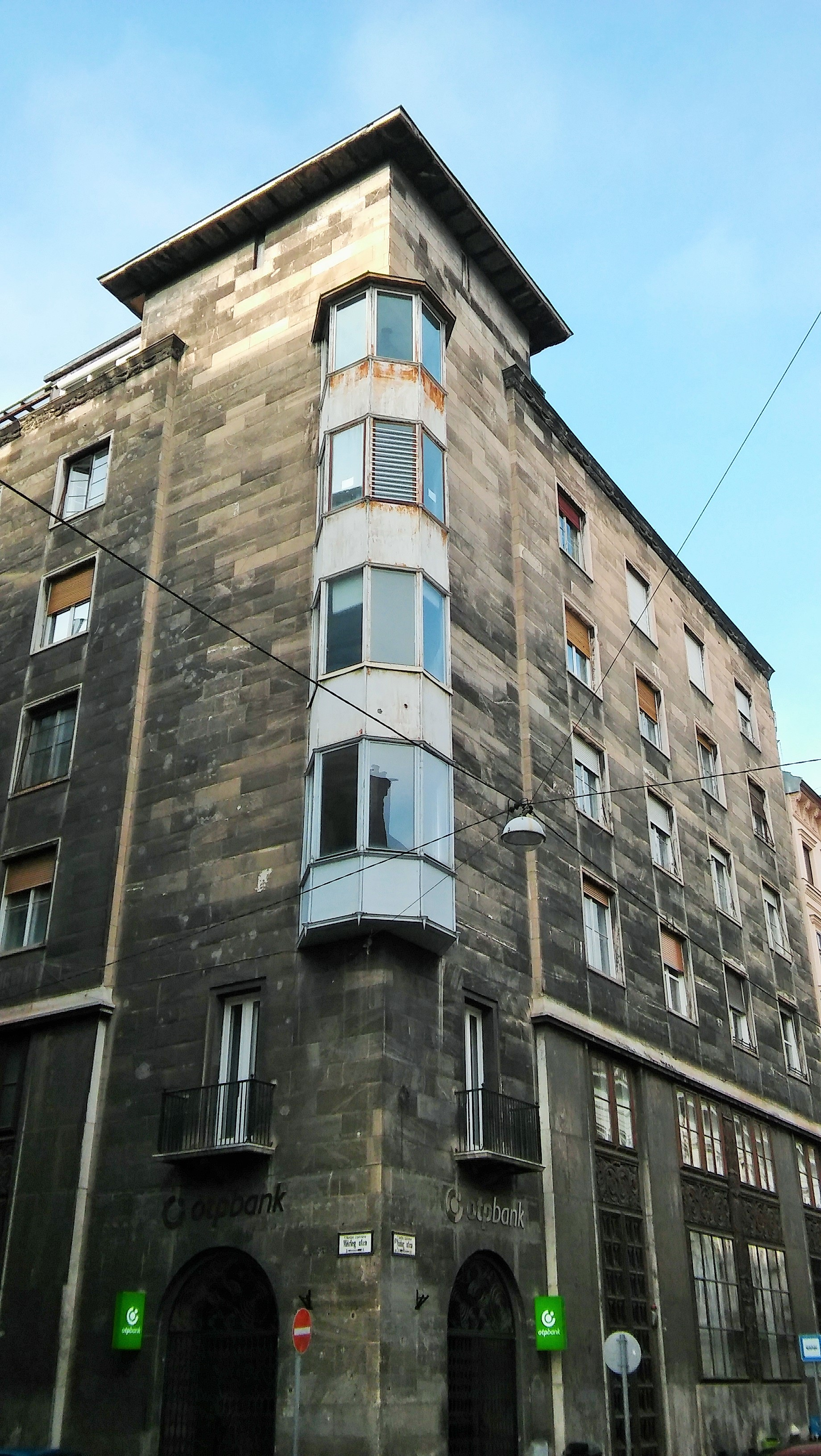
OTP Bank building at Nádor utca 6, Budapest

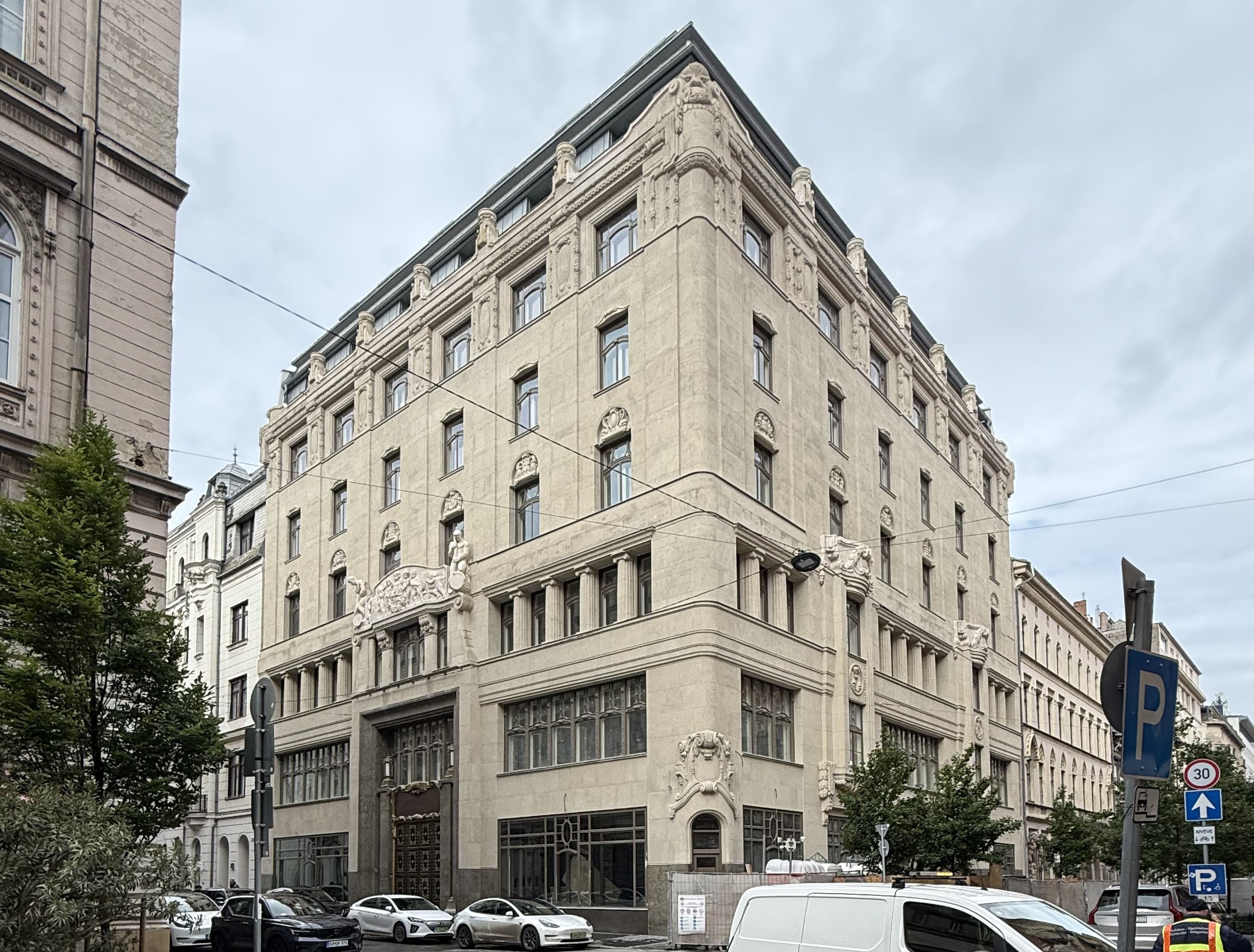
OTP Bank building at Nádor utca 21, Budapest

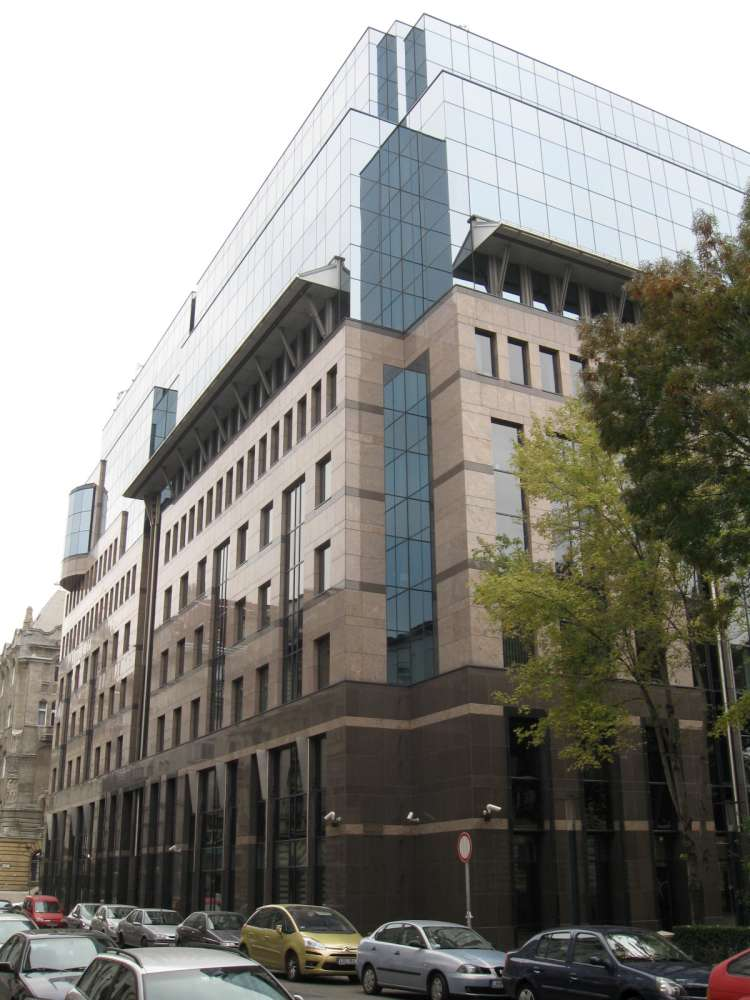
Bank Center building, Szabadság tér 7 in Budapest

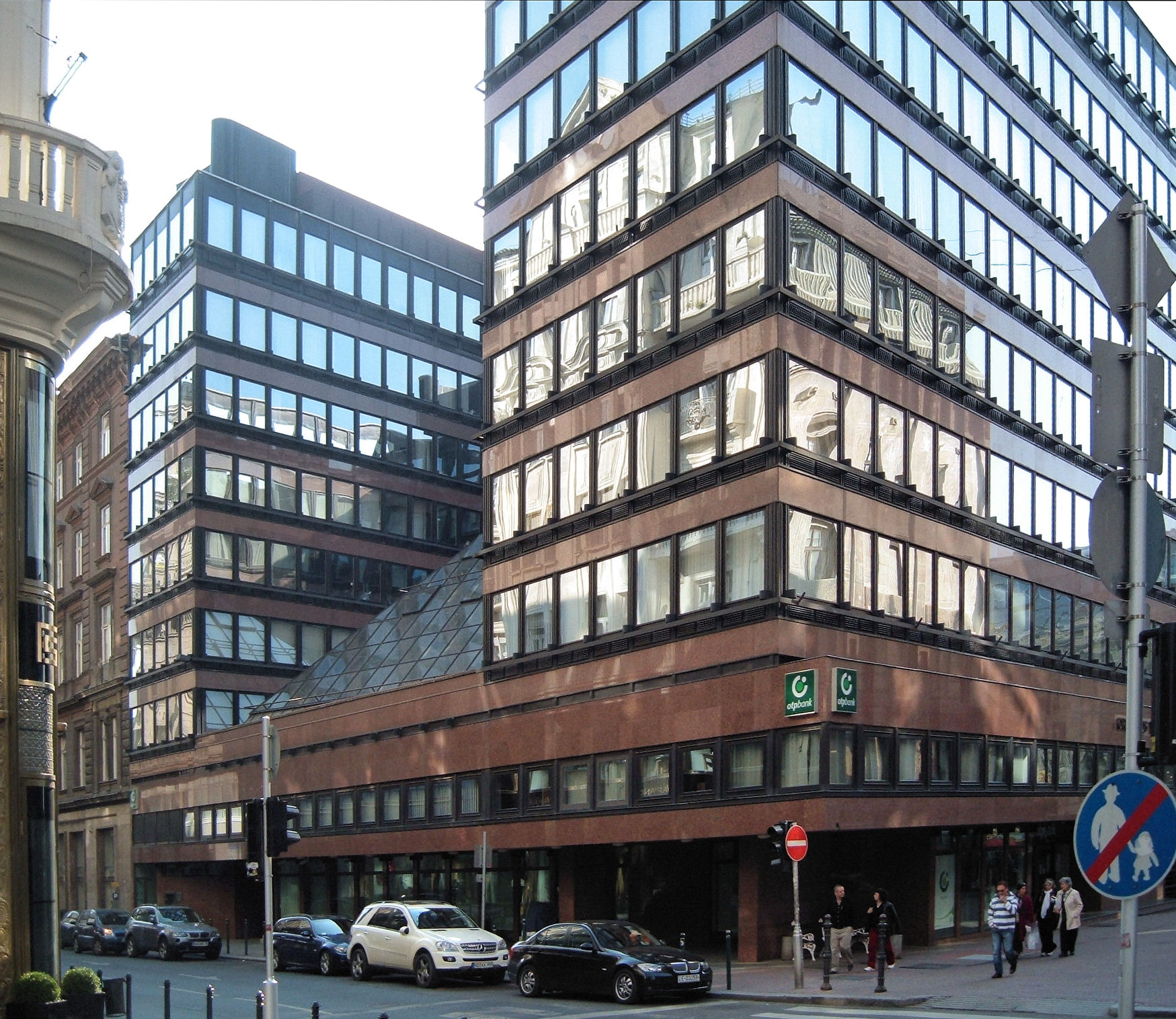
OTP offices in the former Chemolimpex building, Deák Ferenc utca 7-9 in Budapest

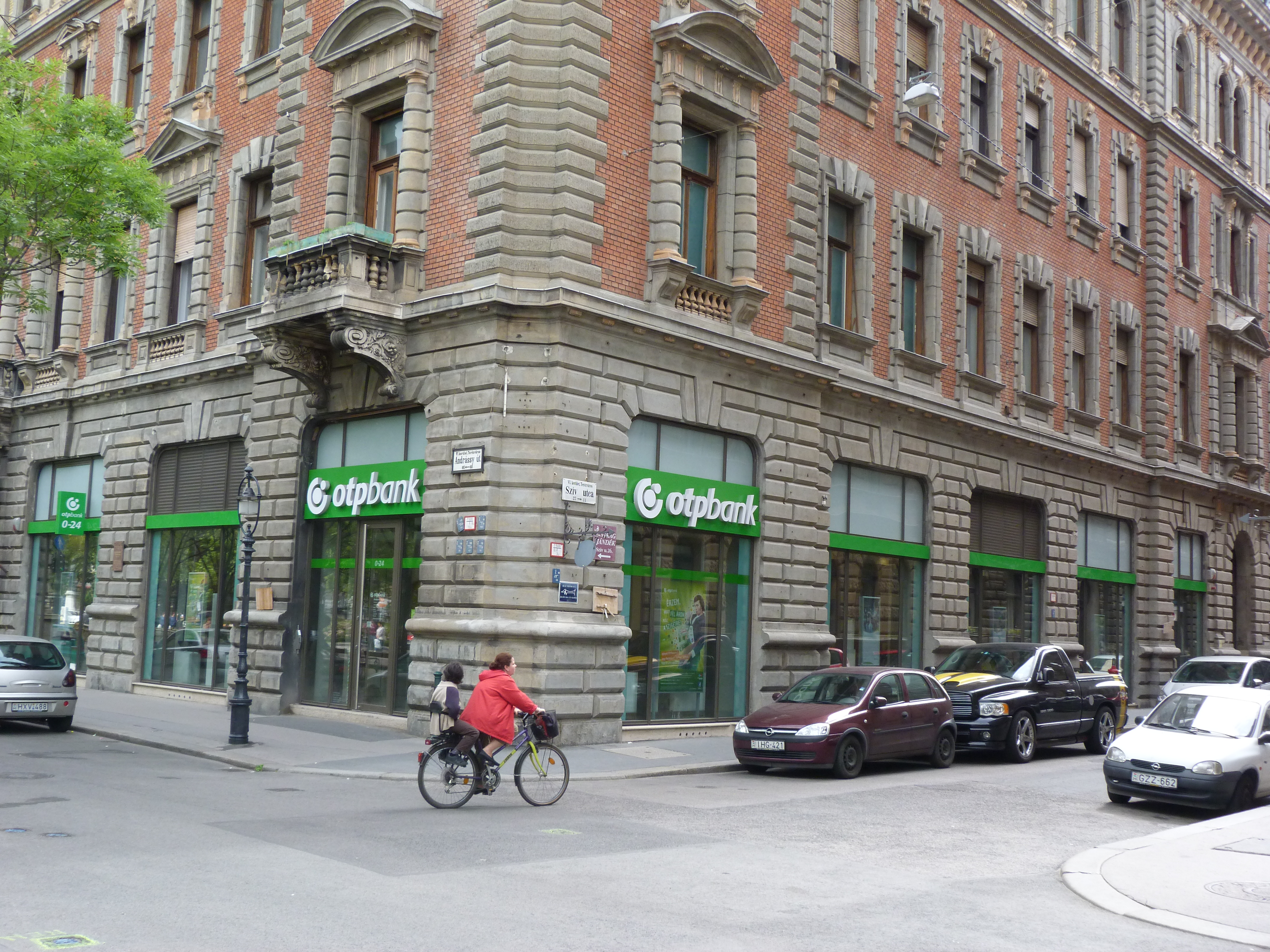
OTP Bank in Andrássy Avenue, Budapest, Hungary

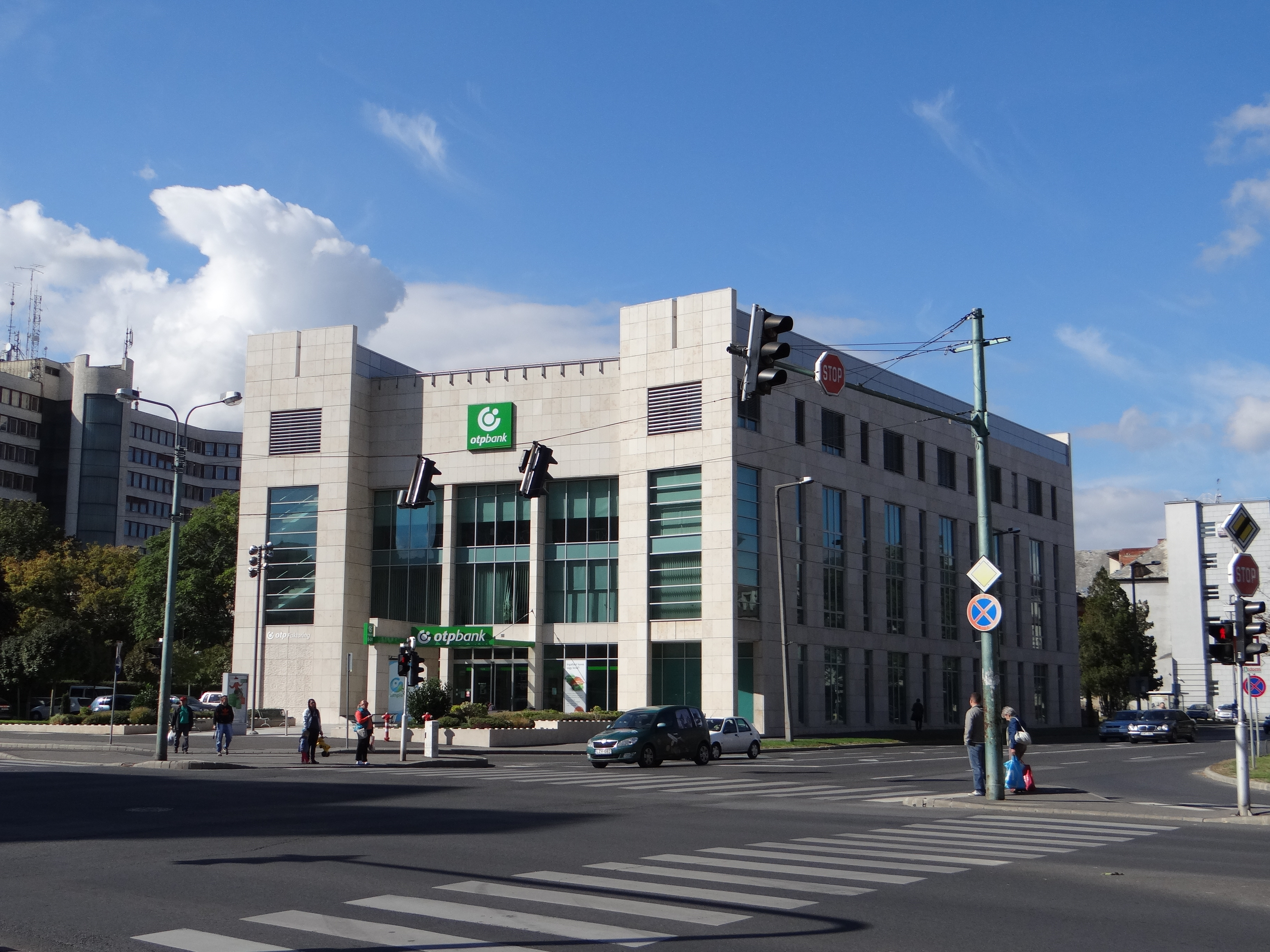
OTP Bank in Miskolc, Hungary

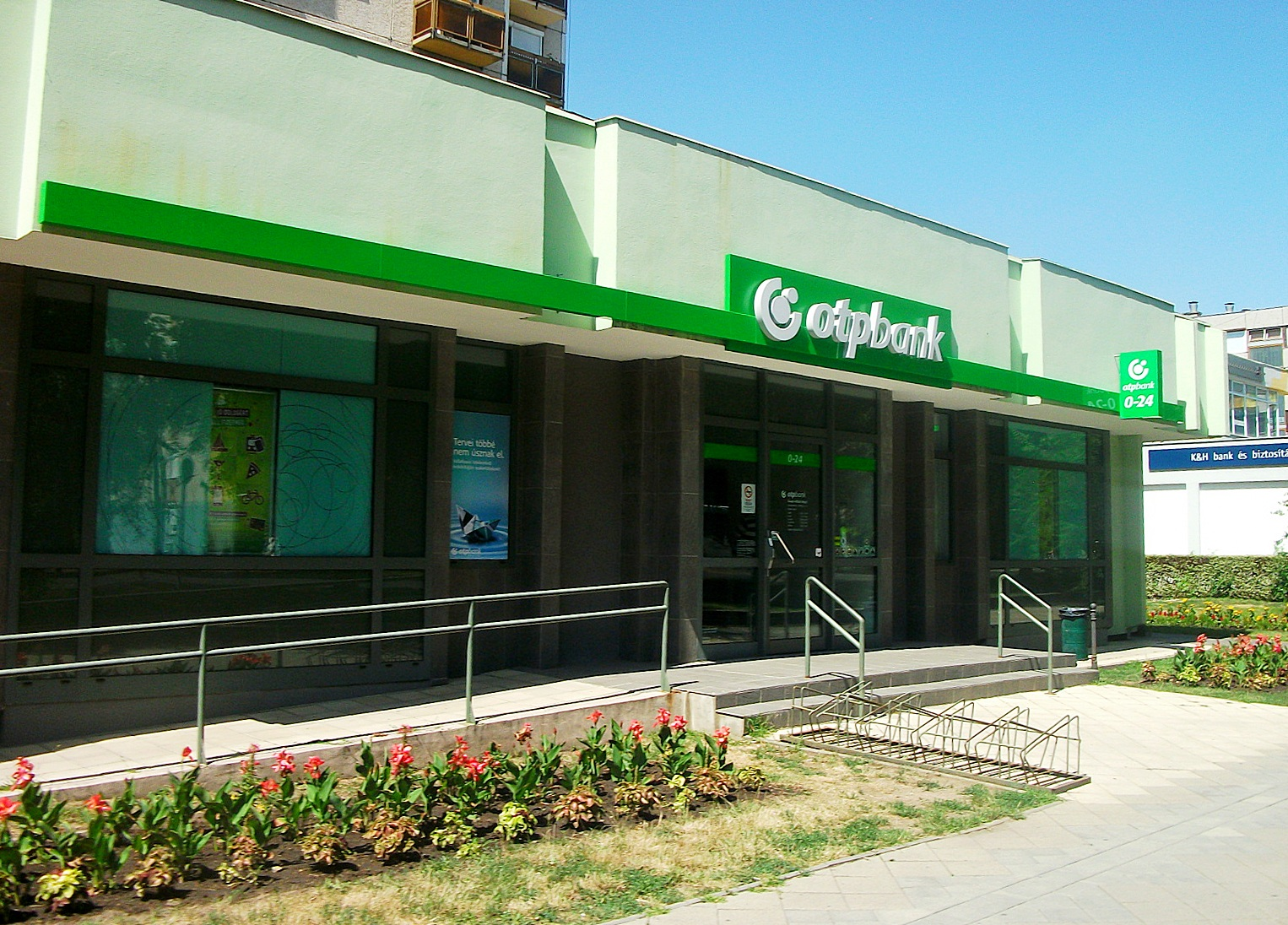
OTP Bank in Hajdúszoboszló, Hungary

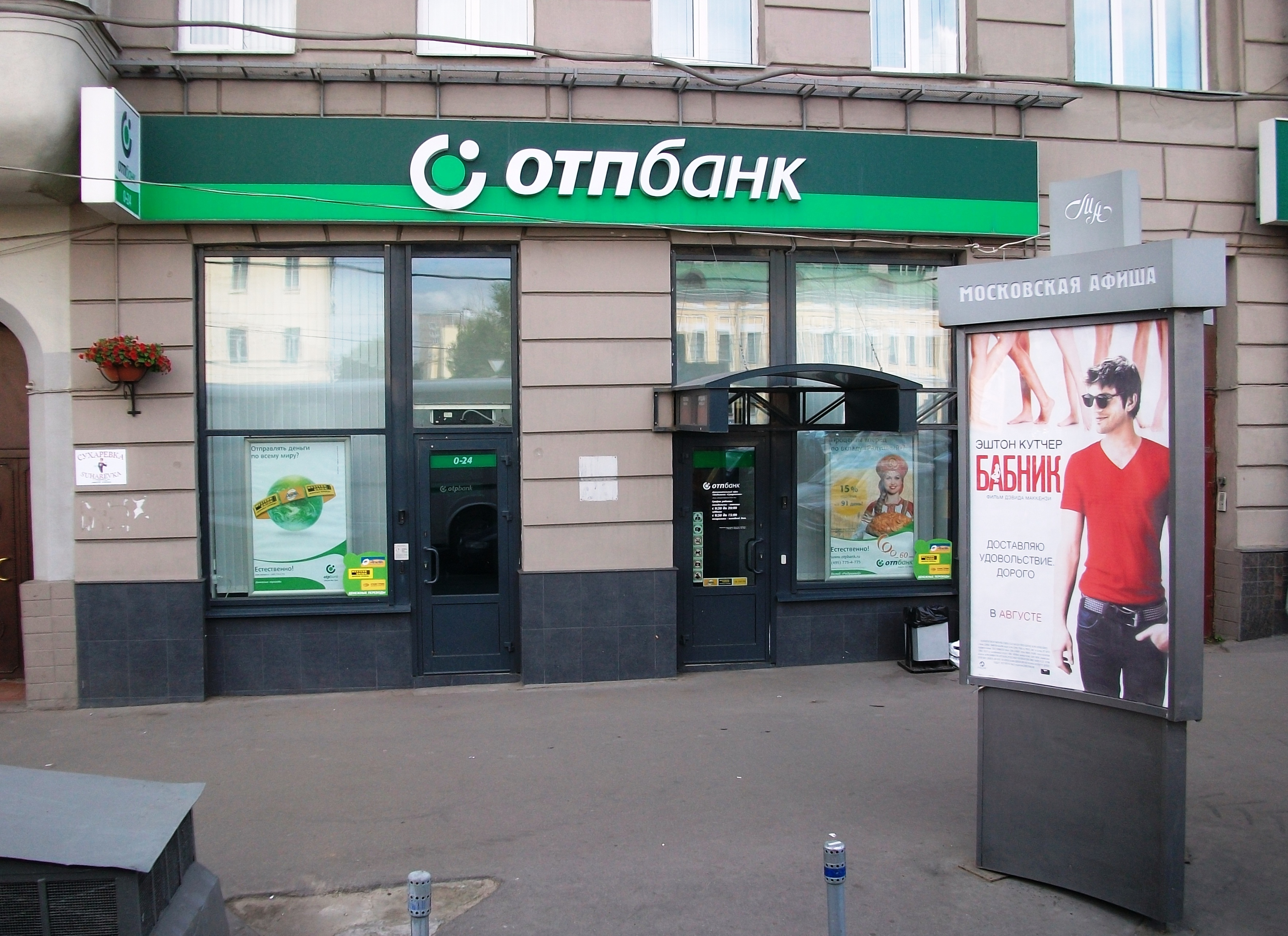
OTP Bank in Moscow, Russia

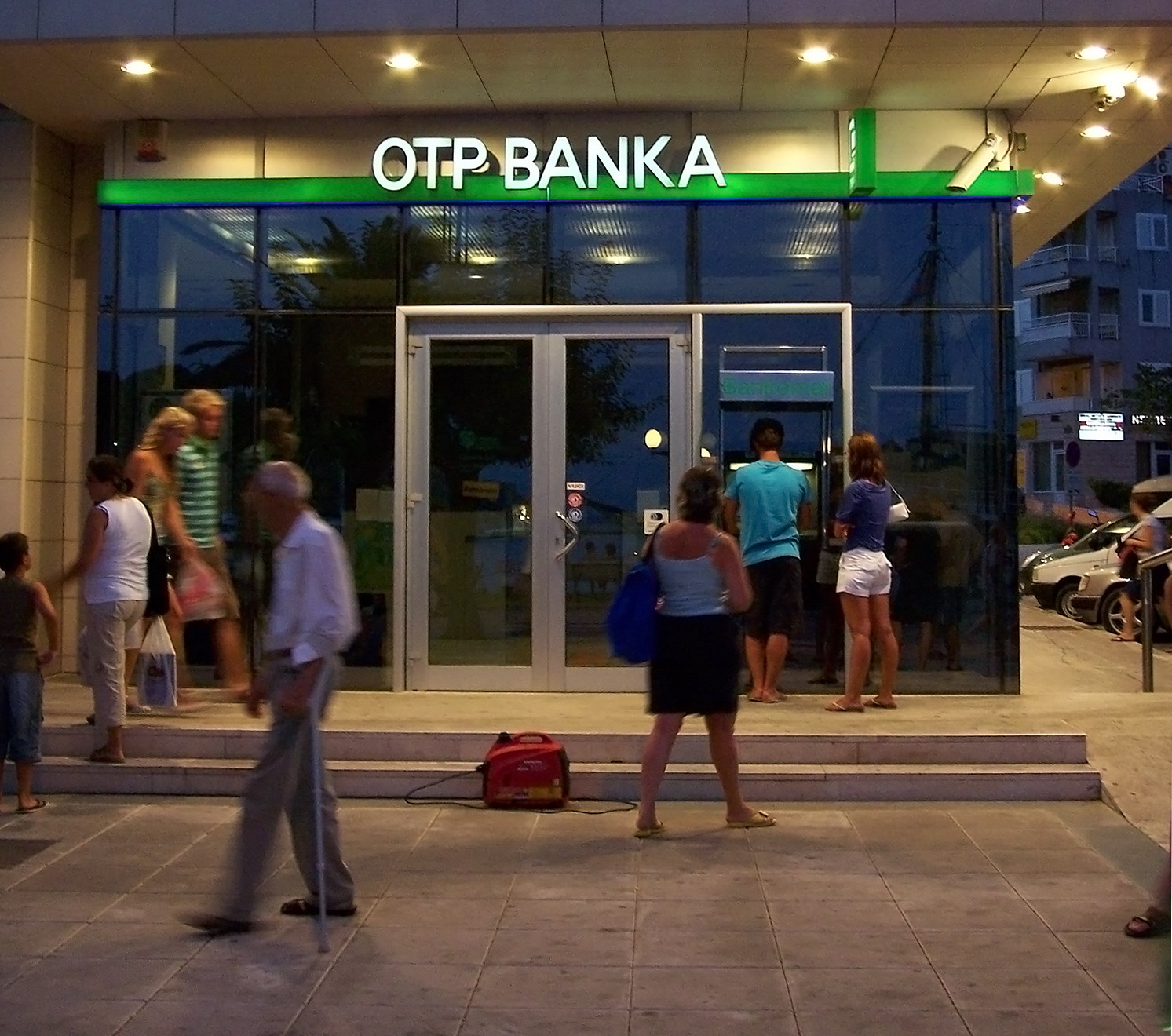
OTP Bank in Makarska, Croatia

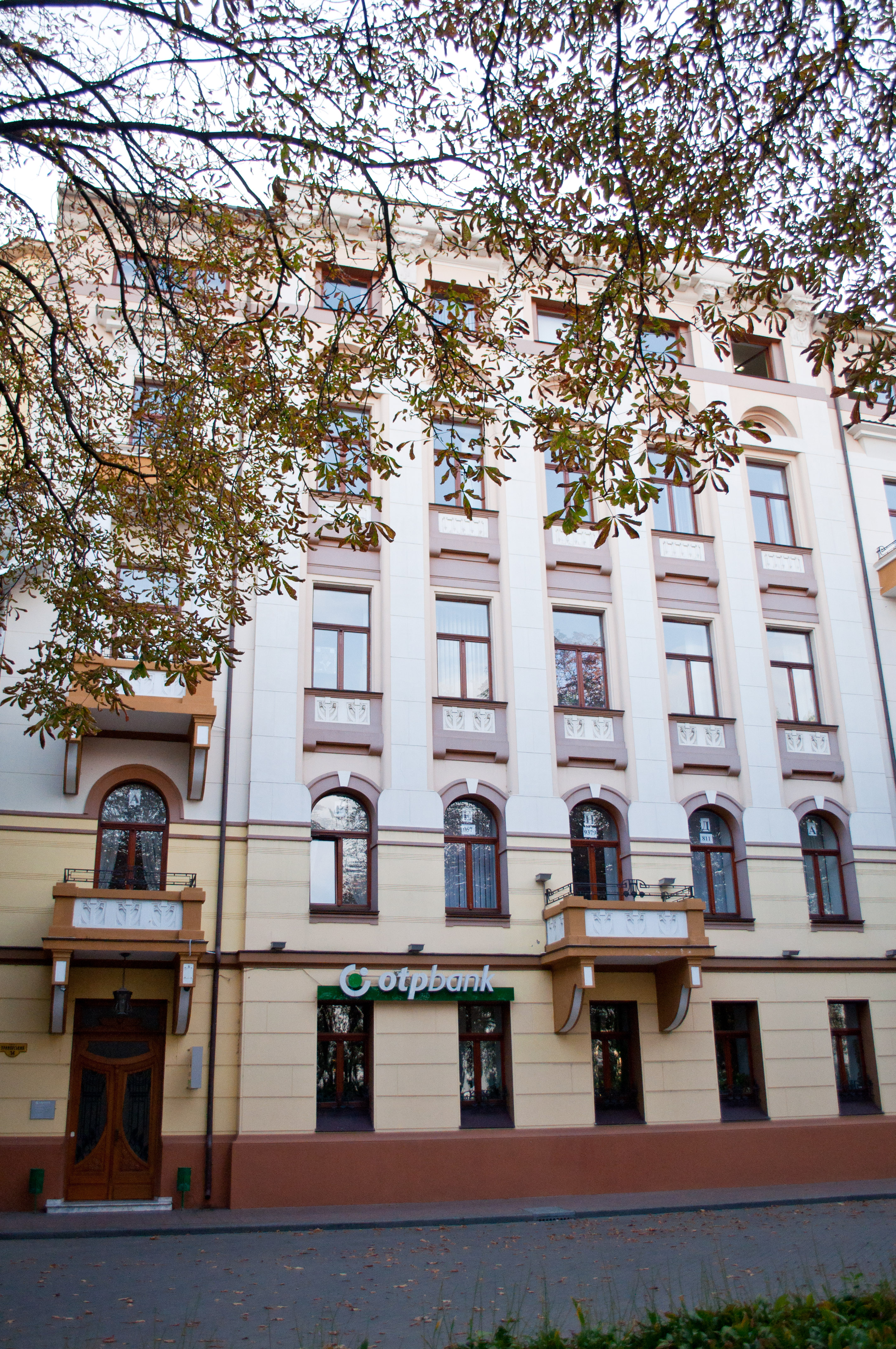
OTP Bank in Odesa, Ukraine

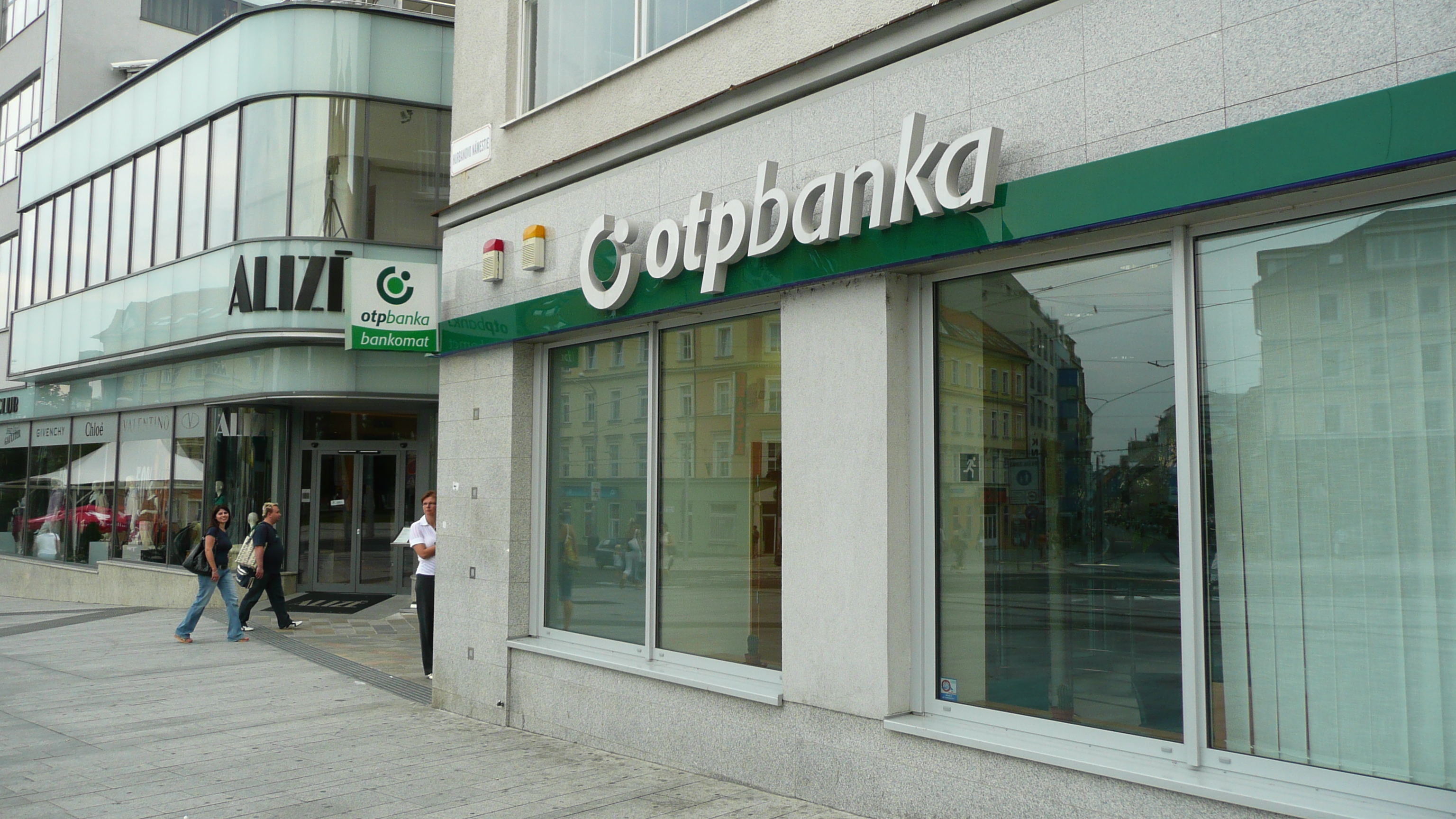
OTP Bank in Bratislava, Slovakia

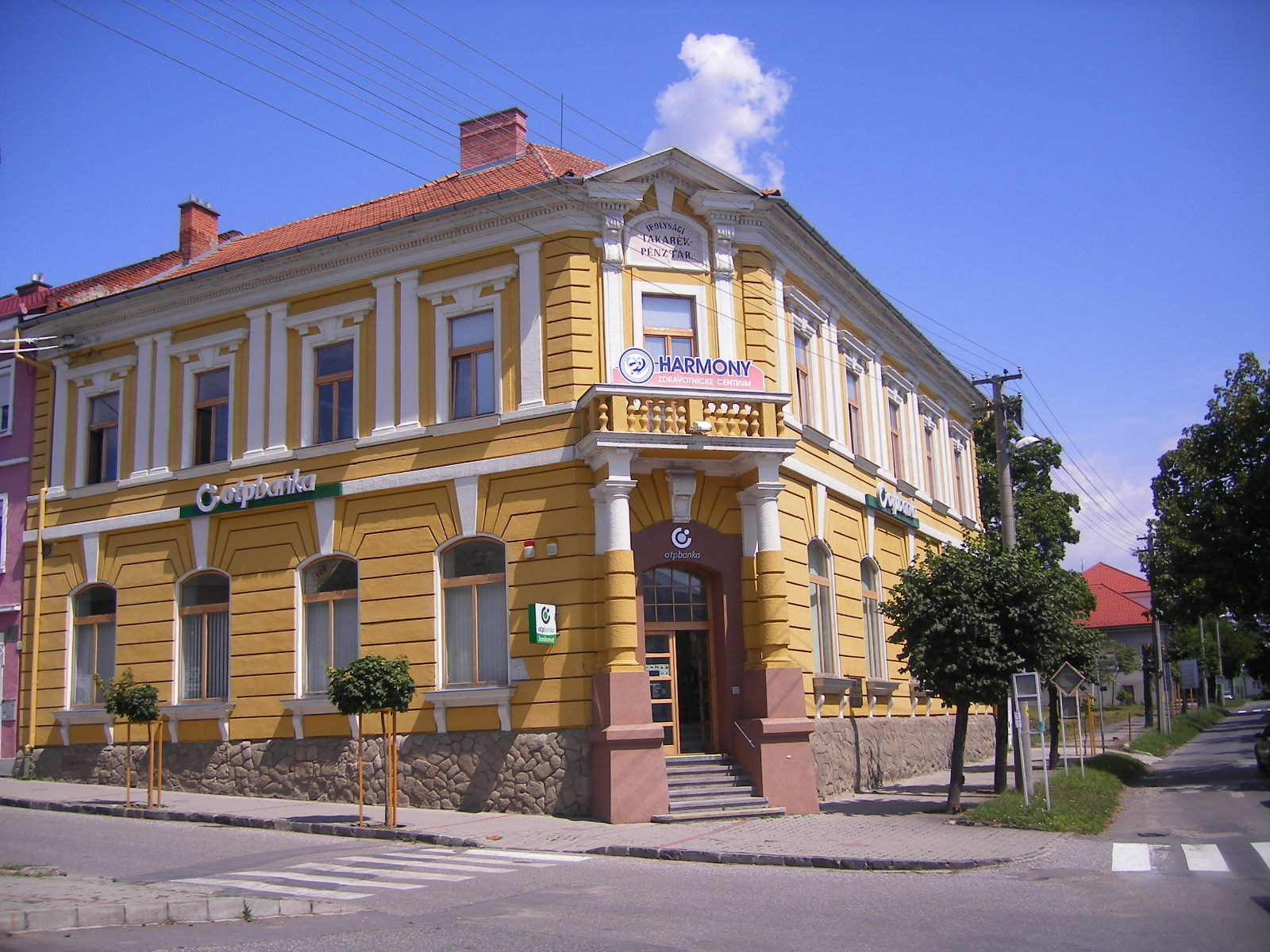
OTP Bank in Šahy, Slovakia

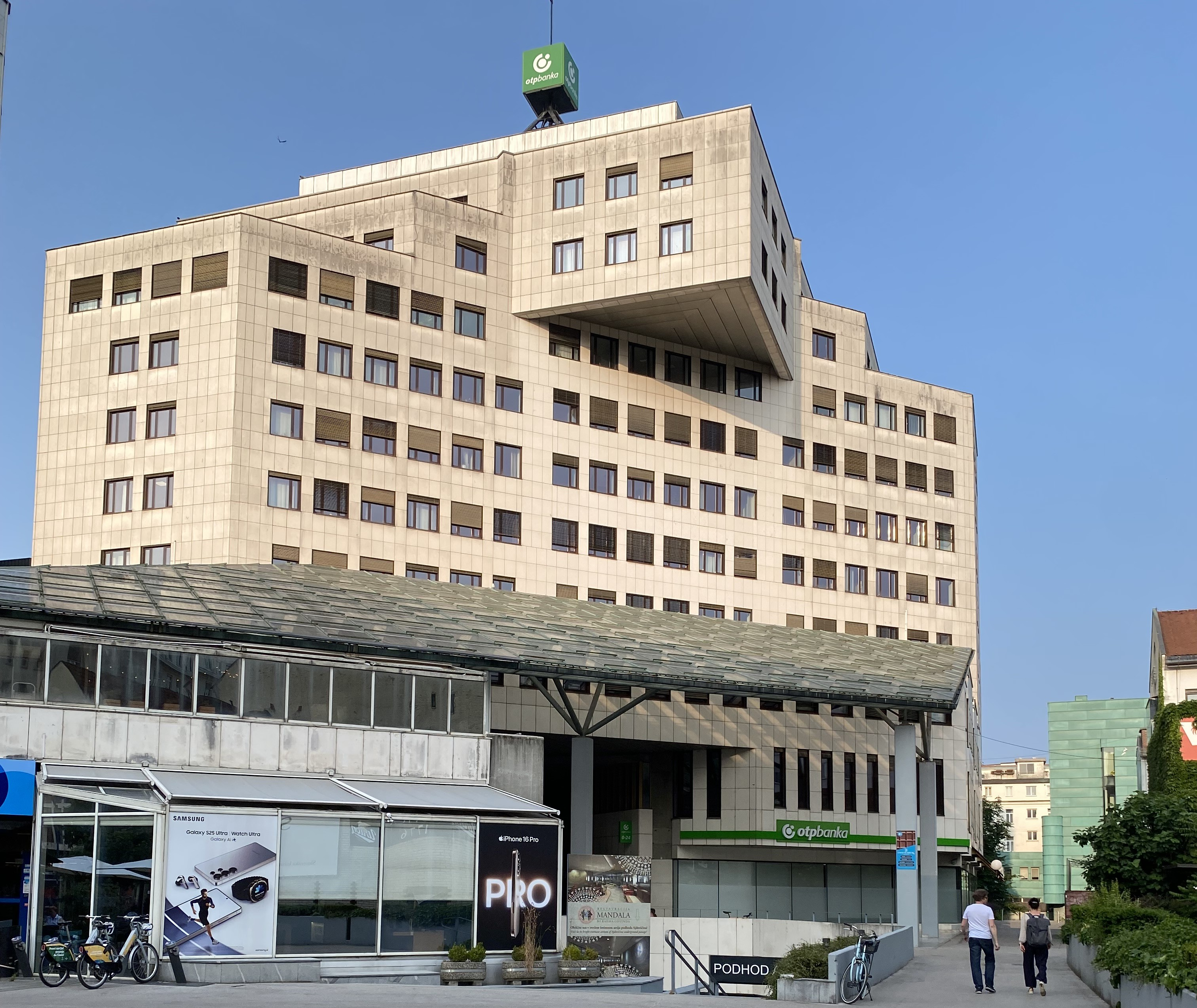
OTP building in Ljubljana, Slovenia, former head office of SKB Housing and Communal Bank

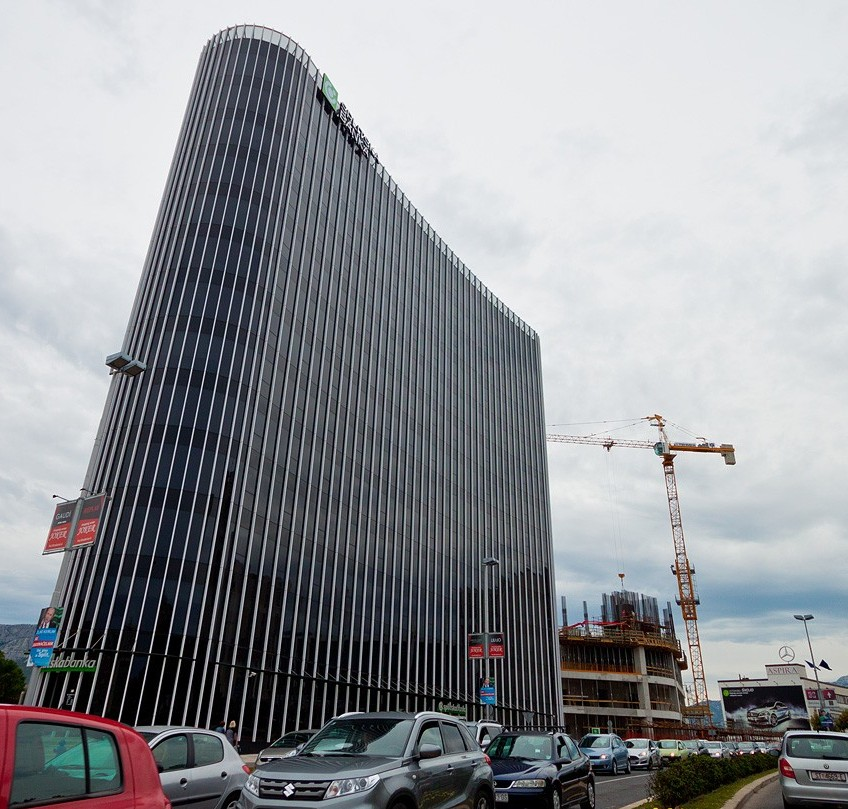
OTP Splitska banka in Split, Croatia

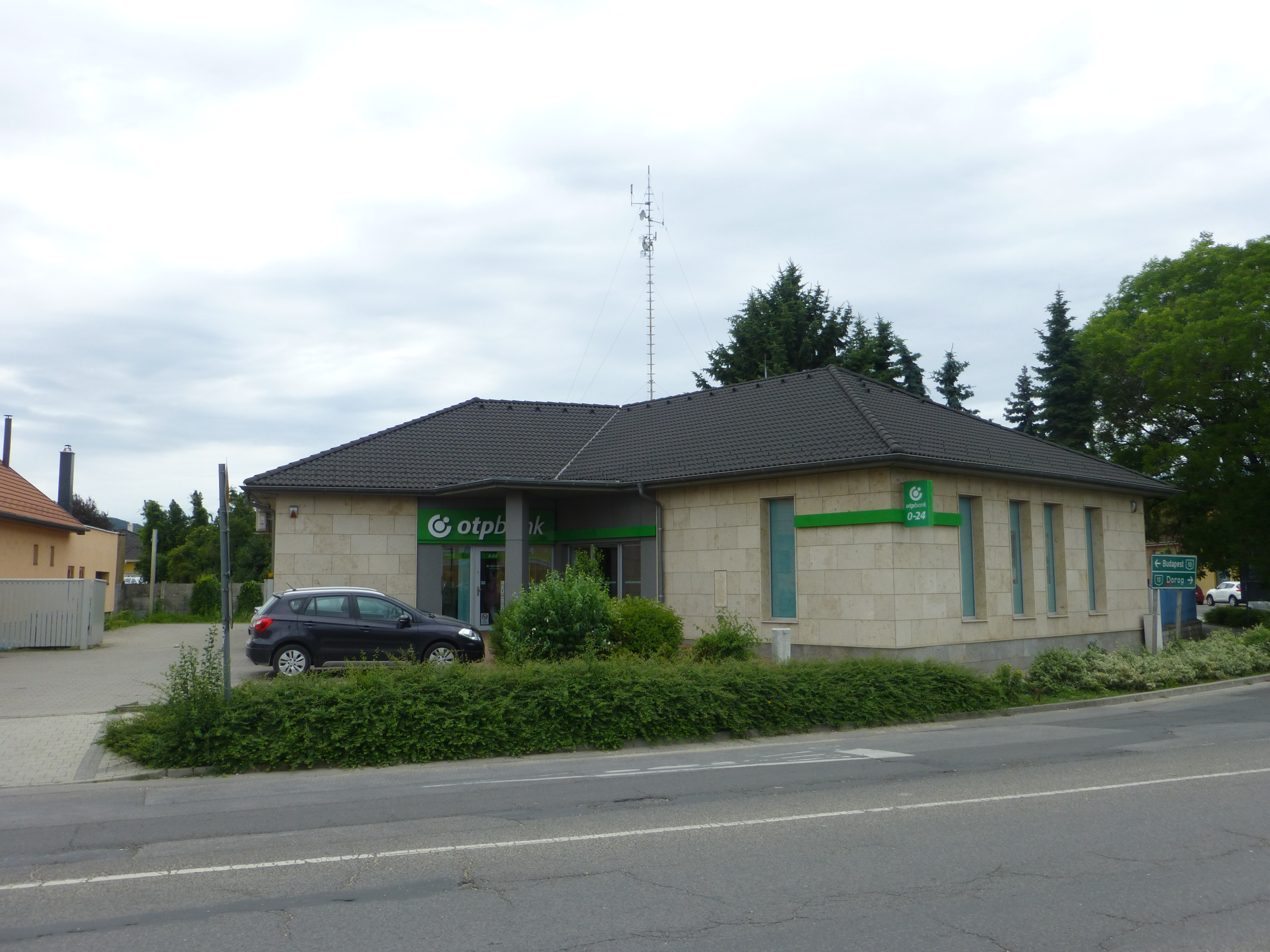
OTP bank Pilisvörösvár, Hungary

== See also ==
- List of banks in Hungary
- List of banks in the euro area
