= Croatian brands =

The following products could be described as hallmarks of Croatian trade. Croatia awards its own quality seal (Croatian: Hrvatska kvaliteta) to the best Croatian products every year. Croatian Chamber of Economy confers the Izvorno hrvatsko (lit. 'Original Croatian' or 'Authentic Croatian') seal to Croatian products and services that undergo rigorous assessments to be recognised as a result of innovation, research and development by Croatian people and enterprises.

== Wines ==
Croatian wines (vino, pl. vina in Croatian) have gained in quality, but are still largely unknown to the world wine market. It is a matter of the developing Croatian economy to make these wines more popular in the world, and it is up to Croatian wine producers to start large-scale production for international markets.

=== White wines ===
- Bogdanuša
- Debit (grape)
- Graševina
- Grk Bijeli
- Kujundžuša – from the region of Imotski
- Malvasia Dubrovačka
- Malvazija Istarska
- Pošip
- Pušipel
- Traminac
- Vugava – from Vis Island
- Žlahtina – from the Island of Krk

=== Red wines ===
- Babić
- Crljenak Kaštelanski – also known as Zinfandel
- Dobričić
- Drnekuša
- Plavac mali – includes regional variations Dingač and Postup
- Teran

=== Dessert wines ===
- Prošek

== Beers ==
Apart from the great abundance of imported international beers such as Heineken, Tuborg, Gösser, and Stella Artois, homebrewn beers (Croatian: pivo) can also be found in Croatia. (Fans already know that the brewery in Split produces Bavarian Kaltenberg beer by licence of the original German brewery.)

- Favorit – brewed in Buzet, Istria
- Kaj – produced in the Croatian region of Podravina by Carlsberg Hrvatska (kaj means "what" in Croatian in Kajkavian dialect)
- Karlovačko – brewed in Karlovac
- Osječko – from Osijek
- Ožujsko – the name referring to the month of March; brewed in Zagreb
- Pan – produced by Carlsberg Hrvatska (formerly known as "Panonska pivovara")
- Staro Češko – Czech beer from Daruvar (home to a Czech minority), brewed in Croatia
- Tomislav – the name referring to King Tomislav; brewed in Zagreb
- Velebitsko – brewed in Pazarište, Gospić
- Vukovarsko – brewed in Vukovar, Syrmia

== Liqueurs and spirits ==
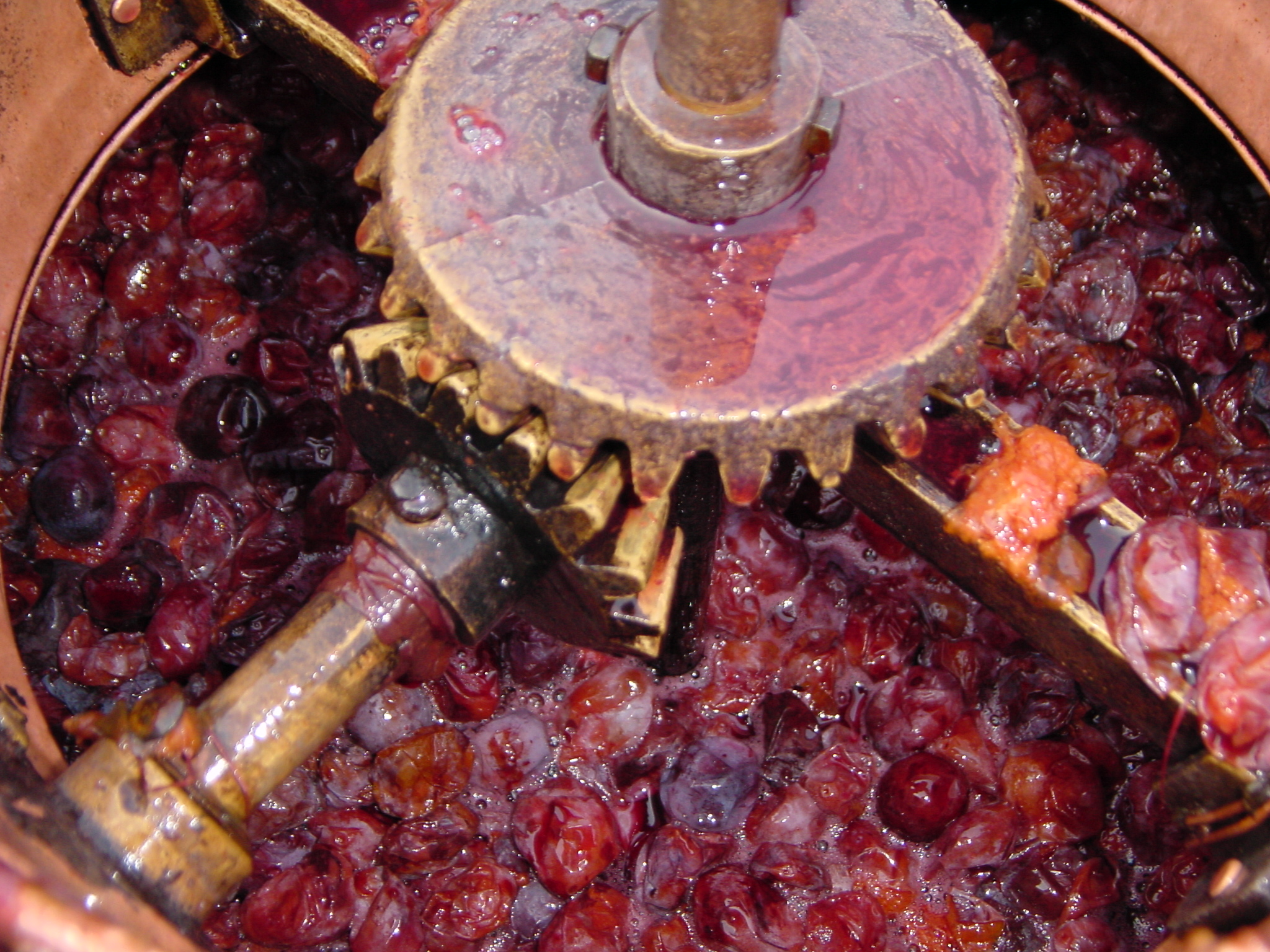
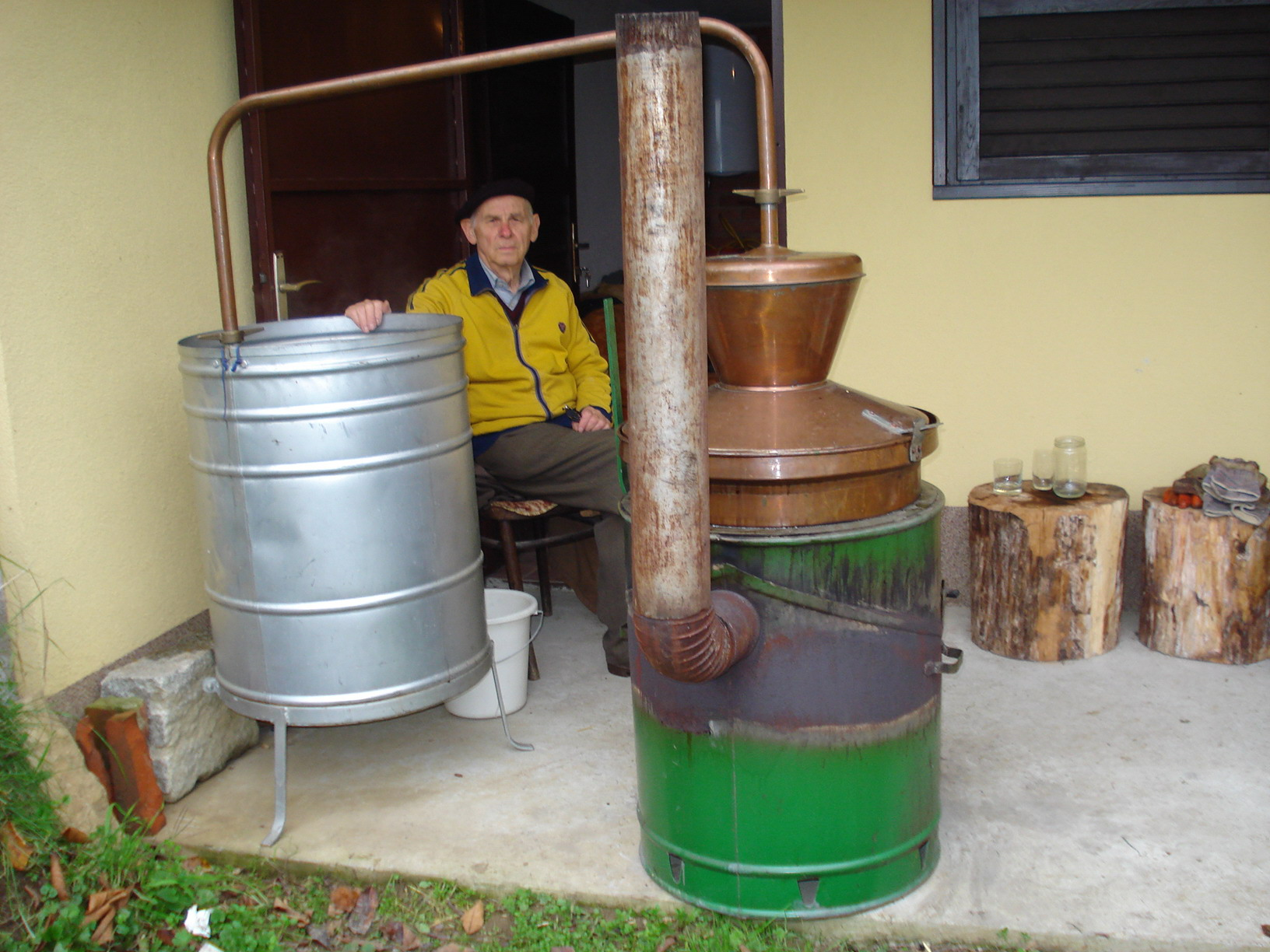
Simple manufacturing system of slivovitz (left) and traditional way of distillation in Međimurje, Croatia
- Drenovac
- Kruškovac – made from pears
- Lozovača
- Maraschino
- Pelinkovac
- Šljivovica
- Travarica
- Vlahovac – made from herbs

== Coffee ==
- Franck

== Mineral water ==
Concerning water quality, Croatian water is greatly appreciated all over the world, and has a leading position in Europe with regard to its water resources. Due to a lack of established industries there has also been no major incidents of water pollution.

- Bistra – produced by Coca-Cola
- Cetina – water from the river Cetina, which flows through the Dalmatian hinterland
- Jamnica – winner of the Paris AquaExpo (the so-called Eauscar) for best mineral water of 2003
- Jana – also belongs to Jamnica, best aromatized mineral water (Eauscar 2004)
- Lipički studenac

== Juices ==
- Badel 1862
- Cedevita – sherbet with vitamin C
- Dona
- Jamnica juices – To sokovi
- Maraska
- Vindija juices – Vindi sokovi

== Meat products ==
- Derma d.d. Varazdin with Derma spices and Derma artificial and natural casings (hogs, sheep, etc.
- Gavrilović high quality meat products
- Koka Varazdin with "Cekin" and "Vindon" brands (Koka is part of the Vindija food corporation)
- Various "PIKs" (Croatian: poljoprivredno-industrijski kombinat, lit. 'agricultural-industrial combine' – agricultural industry, usually meat processing), e.g. PIK Vrbovec, PIK Bjelovar, PIK Rijeka, PIK Đakovo

== Milk and cheese ==
- Lura – Dukat milk products
- Vindija – milk products
- Zdenka – cheese

== Salts and herbs ==
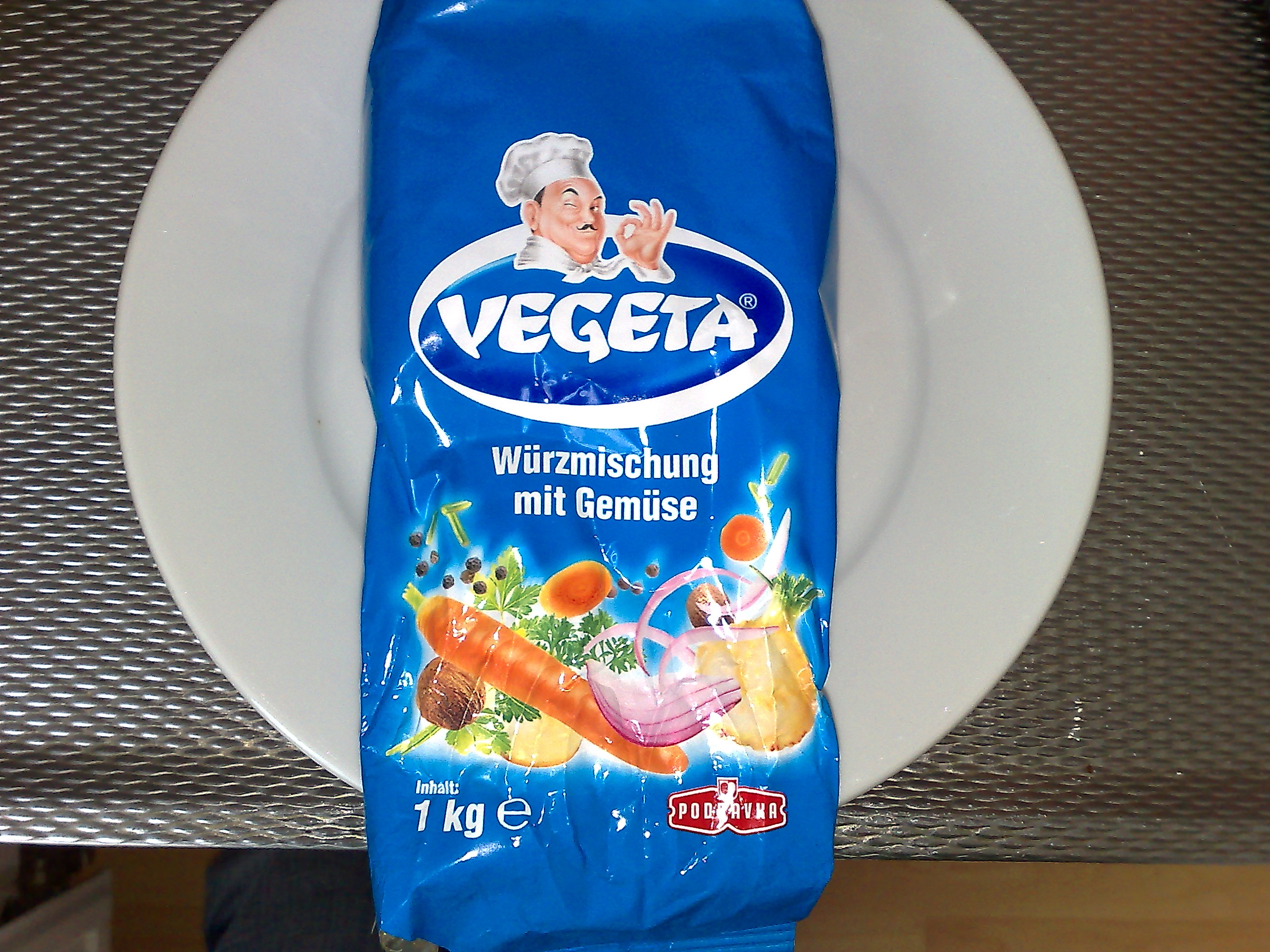
Vegeta product packaging

- Sea salt from the Island of Pag, from Peninsula of Pelješac Ston, and from Nin near Zadar
- Vegeta – herbal salt produced by Podravka

== Fish products ==
- Mackerel and sardines from the Island of Brač

== Sweets ==
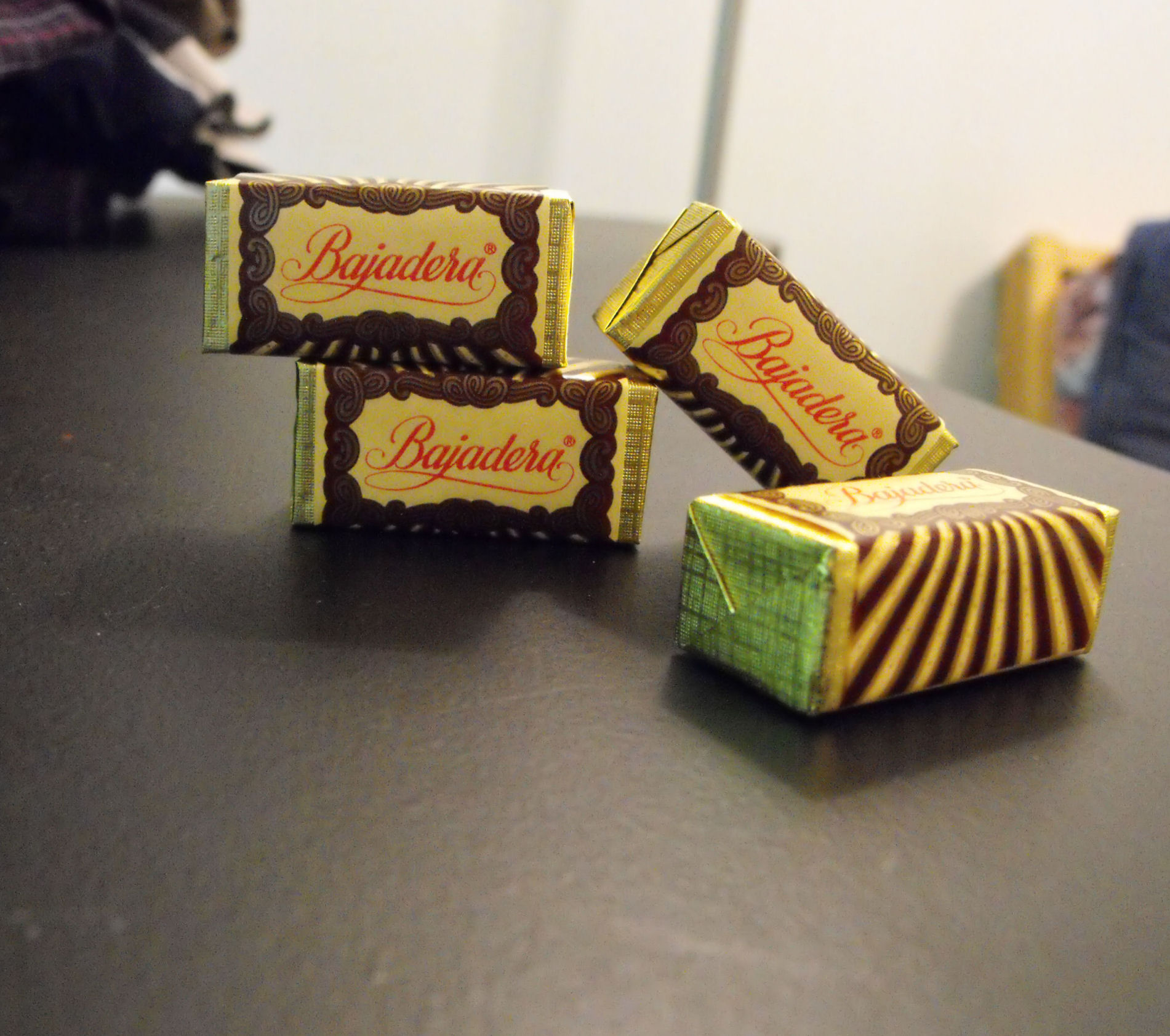
The nougat dessert bajadera

- Koestlin – cookies, sweets
- Kraš – chocolates, sweet jars, Domaćica - famous chocolate tea biscuit Bajadera – famous praline, Životinjsko carstvo (Animal Kingdom) - famous chocolates, Kiki - famous caramels, etc.
- Ledo ice cream
- Podravka jams

== Other ==
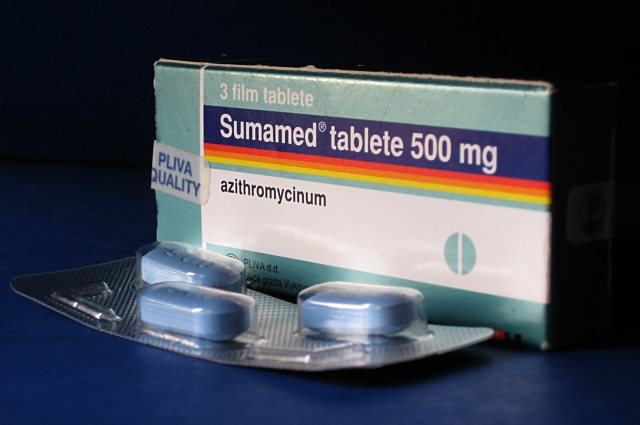
Sumamed - Azithromycin tablets

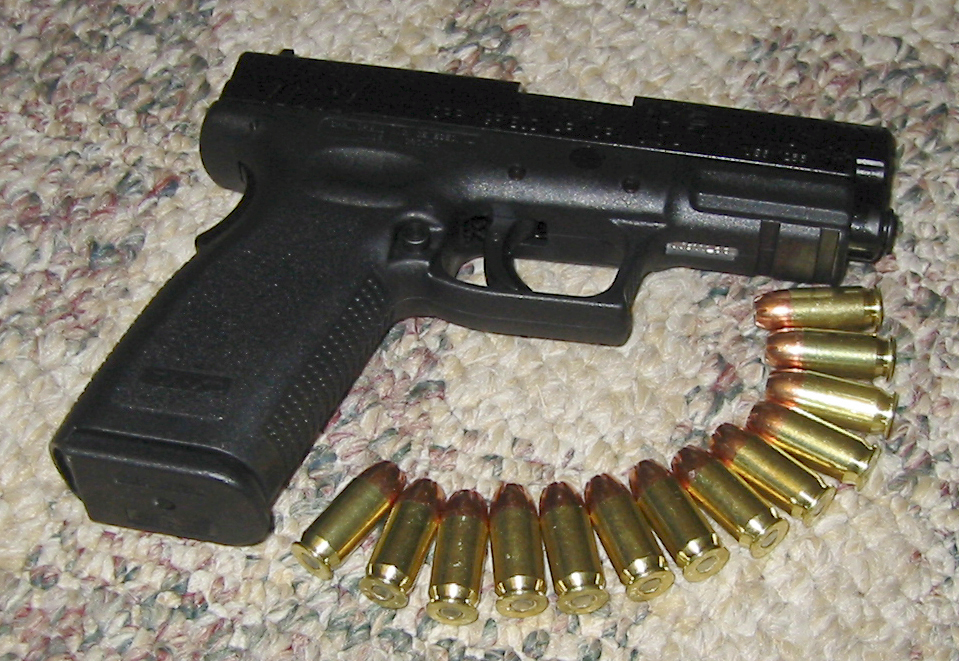
The HS2000 (Springfield Armory XD) .45 ACP Pistol

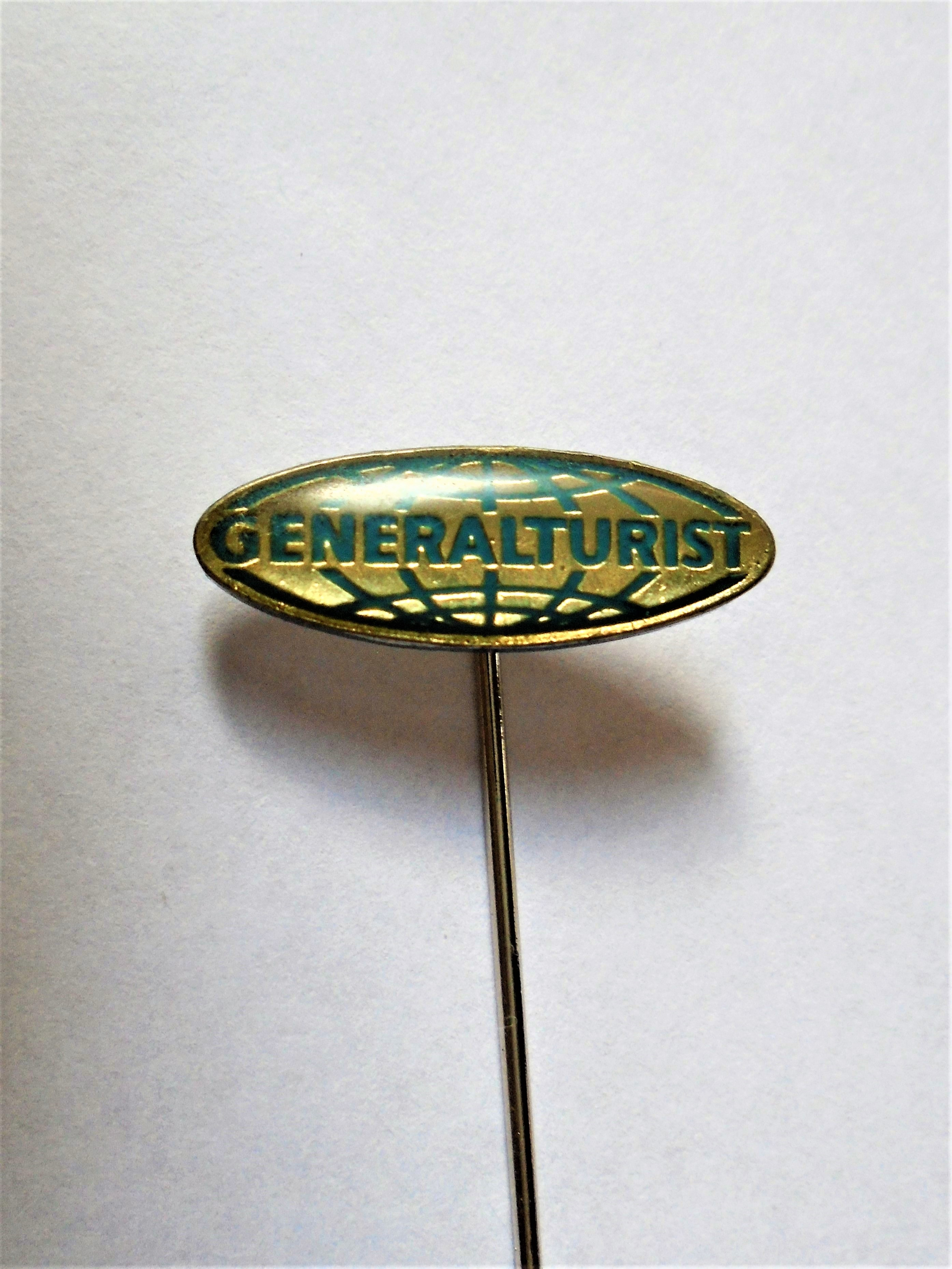
Old enamel pin badge of 'Generalturist', travel agency from Zagreb

- Adriatica.net – a leading Croatian online travel agent
- BioGnost – pharmaceuticals and biomedicine
- Borovo – shoes
- Croatia baterije – batteries
- Croteam – game making company
- Crotram Končar TVŽ Gredelj – electrocompany of trams and train vehicles
- Crotram – Croatian consortium for production of tramways
- Efke – photographic films, papers, and chemicals
- Generalturist – Croatian travel specialist since 1923
- Ghetaldus – eyewear
- HS Produkt – firearms manufacturing company; HS2000, VHS assault rifle
- HUP Zagreb – luxury hotels, business hotels and city hotels in Zagreb
- INA – oil, natural gas and fuel producer
- KONČAR Group – electronics
- Koncern Agram – insurance and bank conglomerate
- Petrokemija – chemical industry
- Pliva – pharmaceutical drugs
- Product-Of-Croatia – database with Croatian products and brands
- Rimac Automobili – electric car and technology company
- TOZ-Penkala – biros, coloured crayons
- Tvornica Duhana Rovinj (TDR) – cigarettes
- Varteks – textiles

== Croatian Quality ==
The label Croatian Quality is awarded by the Croatian Chamber of Economy to companies on Croatian territory which produce material and service of only the highest quality.

== See also ==
- Croatian cuisine
