= Prošek =

Croatian wine

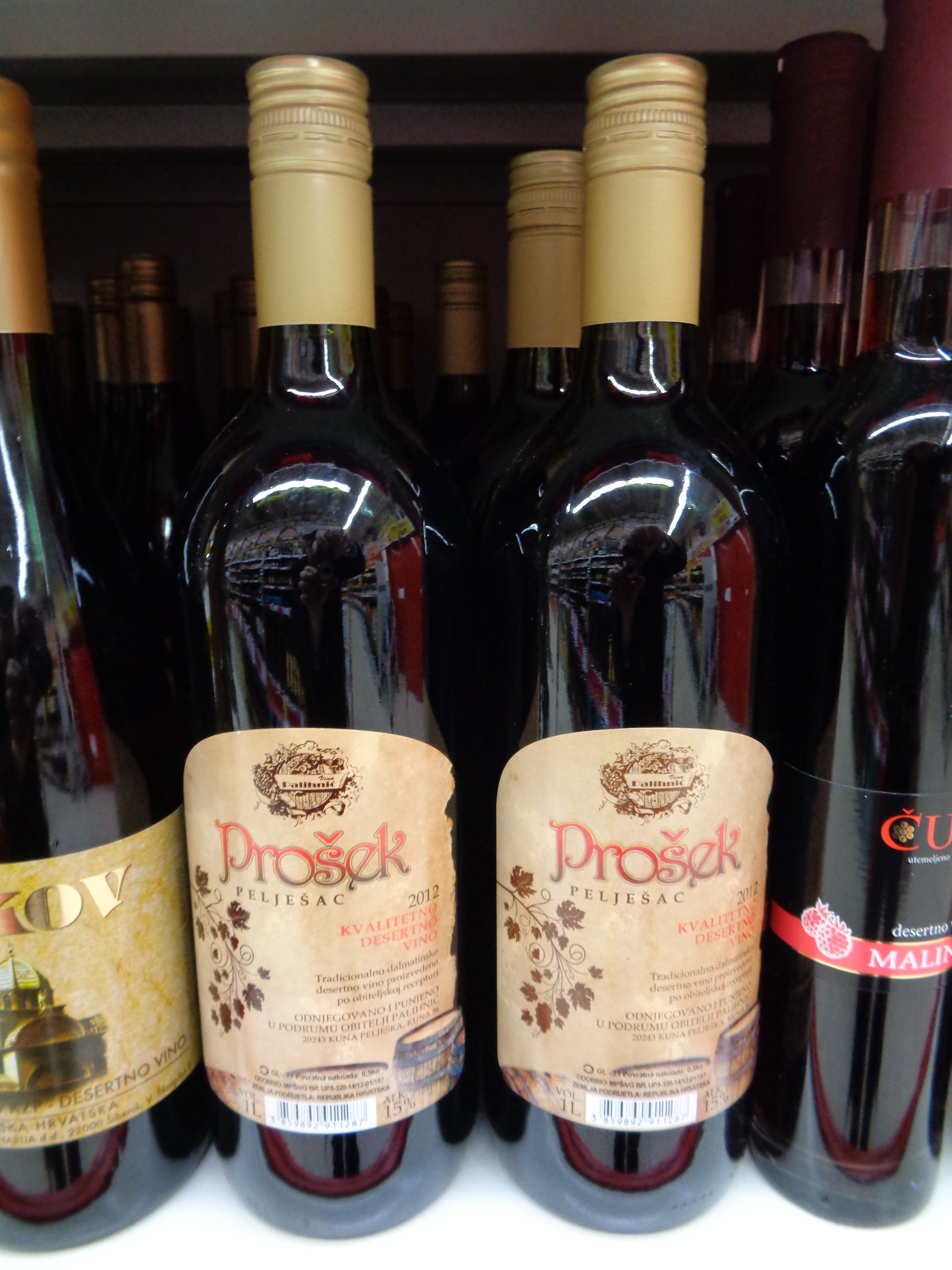
Bottles of prošek

Prošek is a sweet dessert wine that is traditionally from the southern area of Dalmatia, Croatia. It is made using dried wine grapes in the passito method. Good quality Prošek is usually much more expensive by volume than other wines due to an average of seven times as many grapes being needed to make the same amount of wine. While it can vary in the maximum amount, the alcohol level needed to be certified as a true dessert wine must be at least 15%.

The composition is typically of Bogdanuša, Maraština, and/or Vugava (all native Croatian white grapes) with higher-end versions being a blend of the base white grapes and Plavac Mali (a red Croatian grape).

== Confusion with prosecco ==
Although the word Prošek sounds similar to the Italian sparkling wine Prosecco, there are no similarities between the products either with regards to production method, style, or the grapes used, and there is no relation between the origins of the two names. Because of the name similarity, Italy has argued that allowing Croatia to use the name Prošek could confuse consumers with Prosecco. In 2021, the Ministry of Agriculture significantly stepped up its activities regarding Prošek at the EU level, engaging with all member states, as well as domestically. In September 2021, the European Commission agreed to reconsider whether Prošek should be accorded a recognized protected label. Italian politicians immediately denounced the decision, with one regional governor describing the move "as if they wanted to take away Ferrari." In answer to a complaint from Italy's right-wing League party EU Agriculture Commissioner said that two homonymous terms may co-exist under certain conditions, so long as confusion for the consumer was avoided.
