= Vindija =

Vindija may refer to:

- Vindija Cave, a cave located in northern Croatia, known for being the site of one of the best preserved Neanderthal fossils
- Vindija (company), a Croatian food company based in Varaždin
