= Bajadera =

Layered nougat with almonds and hazelnuts

- Type: Praline
- Place of origin: Croatia
- Created by: Kraš
- Main ingredients: Nougat, almonds, hazelnuts or walnuts

Bajadera is a layered nougat with almonds and hazelnuts invented and produced commercially by the Croatian Kraš company. Initially packaged as part of bonbonnieres, bajadera became a separate product in 1954. Bajadera is used for special occasions and is the most sold and most famous Croatian praline; it is also known worldwide. It earned the label Izvorno hrvatsko (lit. 'Authentically Croatian') by the Croatian Chamber of Economy in 1997.

== Description ==
Bajadera is a type of praline, a layered nougat with hazelnuts and almonds. Aside from the industrial version of bajadera, there are also homemade recipes, which usually contain sugar, walnuts, almonds, hazelnuts, ground biscuit, chocolate, butter, and rum, while it is also covered with chocolate glaze. The original recipe is kept secretly by Kraš, a Croatian food company. The newspaper Danas has also published recipes for a lenten bajadera, and bajadera containing white chocolate, and peanut butter. In 2015, Kraš introduced Bajadera Amarus, containing sweet and bitter hazelnuts.

== History and reception ==
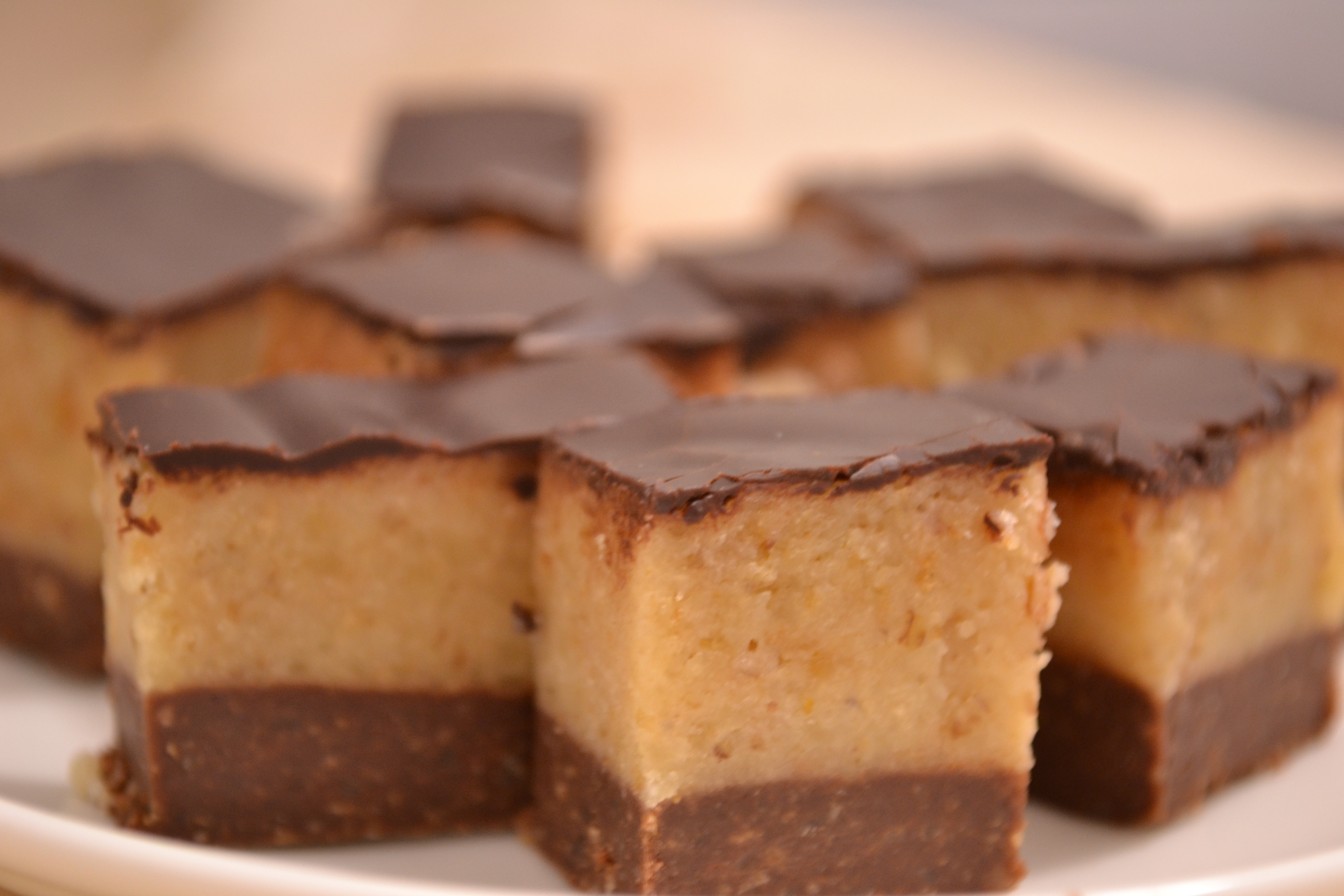
Show in the image is a homemade bajadera. Many homemade recreations of bajadera exist in the former Yugoslavia.

Bajadera's name comes from the La Bayadère, a ballet by Marius Petipa. Initially, bajadera was packaged as part of bonbonnieres, but in 1954 it became a separate product. Its creator is Kraš, who over time slowly modernised the production of bajadera. In 2009, Kraš redesigned its bajadera packaging that was last changed in 1989. The same was done shortly before its 70th anniversary, this time with the help of Saatchi & Saatchi.

The Croatian Chamber of Economy awarded it the Izvorno hrvatsko (lit. 'Authentically Croatian') label in 1997, intended to convey originality and quality. Thus, it became the first Croatian dish to earn that label.

== Modern consumption ==
Known worldwide, bajadera is often used as a present for special occasions, such as family celebrations, birthdays, and baptisms. It is the most sold and most famous Croatian praline. There are various variations of bajadera, such as a bajadera ice cream, cake, cocktail, and a liqueur.
