= European Business and Technology Centre =

The European Business and Technology Centre (EBTC) was constituted in 2008 as a programme co-funded by the European Union. It transitioned to an independent organisation in March 2016, continuing the EU mandate to facilitate Europe-India cross-border collaboration. EBTC as an organisation is coordinated by Eurochambres, the Association of European Chambers of Commerce and Industry.

The EBTC is headquartered in New Delhi.

== History ==
During the ninth EU-India Summit in Marseille, EU and Indian leaders discussed regional situations, global issues, and the strengthening of EU-India relations. On 29 September 2008, the EU and India approved the launch of EBTC in India to support business-to-business and research co-operation between the EU and India. The project officially launched in October 2008, with an office in New Delhi and activities commencing in January 2009. By 2011, its presence had expanded pan-India, with regional offices in Mumbai and Kolkata. Another office opened in Bangalore in 2013.

In January 2013, India became the 54th country to join the Enterprise Europe Network. The EBTC leads the Enterprise Europe Network India consortium along with its partners, the Federation of Indian Export Organisations (FIEO) and the Confederation of Indian Industry (CII) / Global Innovation & Technology Alliance (GITA), to provide business support services primarily to SMEs and entrepreneurs from the EU and India.

The EU-funded project ended on 29 February 2016, and EBTC is now an independent, self-sustainable company. The physical presence has been recentered on Delhi and Bangalore, but activities continue on a pan-Indian level.

== Collaboration ==
EBTC works with organisations from the EU and India. Alongside lead group Eurochambres, other partners include the Baltic Innovation Agency, Basildon Borough Council. Centro Estero Internazionalizzazione Piemonte. CleanTuesday, Danish Technological Institute. Dublin Chamber of Commerce. European Institute for Asian Studies, Europe India Chamber of Commerce, The Fraunhofer Society. The EuroIndia Centre, Vision on Technology (VITO), EuroIndia Research Centre. Indo-French Chamber of Commerce and Industry. Indo-Italian Chamber of Commerce and Industry.
