= Čokolešnik =

Croatian wheat porridge brand

Čokolešnik is a primarily children's food made by Podravka, a food company from Croatia.

== Ingredients ==
Čokolešnik is a food primarily intended for children over the age of four months but is often consumed by adults as well. It has high nutrition value made out of 60.2% wheat flour, 6% chocolate in powder and 2% hazelnuts. The rest of ingredients are vitamins (B_{1}, B_{2}, B_{6}, and B_{12}). It may contain milk but does not require any kind of cooking.

== History ==
It was first produced since 1980 by the Slovenian company Droga Kolinska, as part of a "Bebi" program of instant porridges with many flavors, including "rižko" (with rice), "medenko" (with honey), "karamelko" (with caramel), "vanilko" (with vanilla) and "čoko" (with chocolate), among others. The most popular flavors of these, Čokolešnik and Čoko, survived to this day and continue to be the two main brands of this product.

Bebi withdrew from Slovenia and other countries of Southeast Europe in 2007, but remained in the markets of the former Soviet Union. The Čokolešnik and Čoko brands were sold to the Croatian food company Podravka on January 1, 2009. After the sale of the Čokolešnik and Čoko brands, Droga Kolinska stopped selling the Bebi brand in early April 2009 due to deteriorating sales in Russia and Ukraine. The Bebi program was divided into the Bebi, Bebi premium and Bebi junior lines. In 2020, the brand was bought by the Serbian group Nelt. The Mirna factory was not part of the sale.

The small town of Koprivnica built a museum to honor the brand that owns it. The brand Podravka is highly popular in other European countries for producing other products, such as Vegeta, a popular flavor enhancer in Hungary, Austria and in Croatia.
