= Chambers Ireland =

Association of Chambers of Commerce in Ireland

- The Chambers of Commerce of Ireland
- Formation: 1923
- Legal status: company limited by guarantee
- Purpose: Chambers of commerce in Ireland
- Location: St. Stephen's Green, Dublin, Ireland
- Region served: Ireland
- CEO: Ian Talbot (as of 2021)
- Affiliations: EUROCHAMBRES, International Chamber of Commerce
- Website: Chambers.ie

The Chambers of Commerce of Ireland, trading as Chambers Ireland, is the federation of chambers of commerce for the Republic of Ireland. It is a member organisation of EUROCHAMBRES.

== Member organisations ==
As of 2020, the following organisation were members of Chambers Ireland:

- Arklow & District Chamber
- Athlone Chamber
- Ballina Chamber
- Ballyhaunis Chamber
- Bantry Chamber
- Bray & District Chamber
- Cavan Chamber
- Cobh & Harbour Chamber
- Cootehill Chamber
- Cork Chamber
- County Carlow Chamber
- County Kildare Chamber
- County Meath Chamber
- County Tipperary Chamber
- Drogheda & District Chamber
- Dublin Chamber
- Dún Laoghaire–Rathdown Chamber
- Dundalk Chamber
- Dungarvan & West Waterford Chamber
- Ennis Chamber
- Fingal Dublin Chamber
- Galway Chamber
- Kilkenny Chamber
- Laois Chamber
- Letterkenny Chamber
- Limerick Chamber
- Longford Chamber
- Mallow Chamber
- Mullingar Chamber
- Northern Ireland Chamber of Commerce and Industry
- Shannon Chamber
- Sligo Chamber
- South Dublin Chamber
- Tralee Chamber
- Tullamore & District Chamber
- Waterford Chamber
- Westport Chamber
- County Wexford Chamber
