= Zlata Bartl =

Croatian chemist (1920–2008)

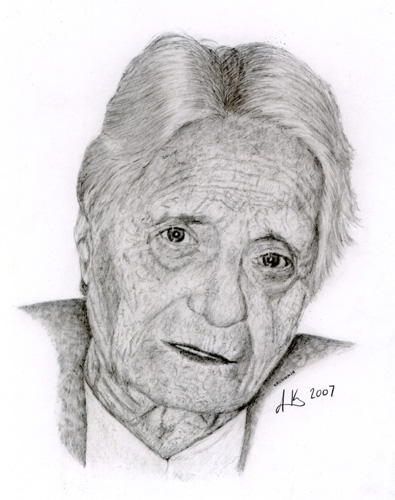
Zlata Bartl

Zlata Bartl (Dolac, 20 February 1920 – Koprivnica, 30 July 2008) was a Bosnian Croat scientist and the creator of Vegeta.

Bartl finished school in Sarajevo and went to Zagreb to study natural sciences, engineering, medicine and health, biotechnical sciences, social sciences, and humanities.

In 1955, she began working as a chemical technician at Podravka in Croatia. It was there in 1959 that she created Vegeta, which would become one of the most popular condiments in all of Eastern Europe, and especially in the Balkan region. She has since then received numerous recognitions and awards, including the Order of Danica Hrvatska.

There is a scholarship foundation set up in her name for graduate students studying science in Zagreb.
