= Bonbonniere =

Box for storing candy

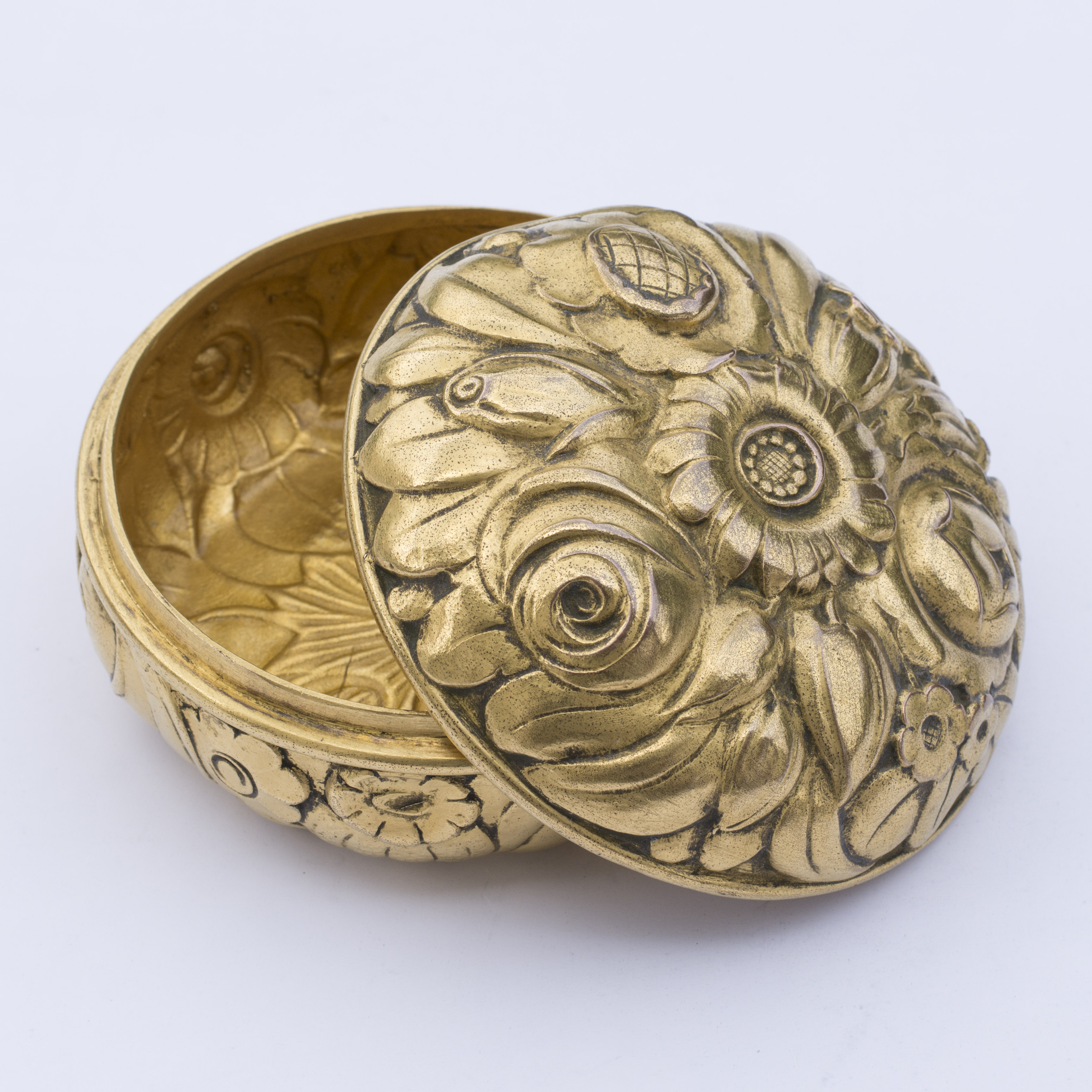
A bonbonniere designed by Georges Béal, 1920

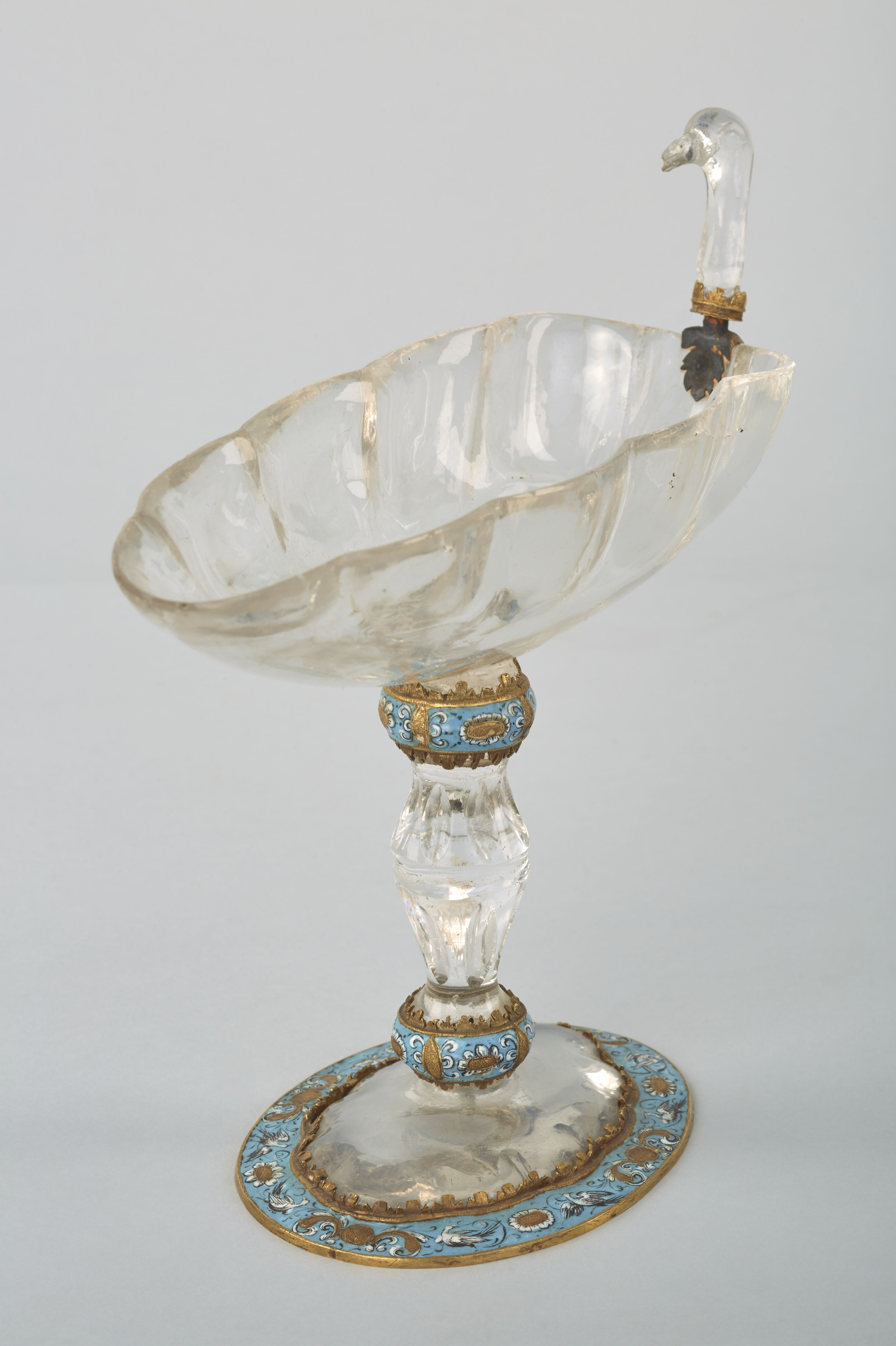
Drageoir (1550–1650)

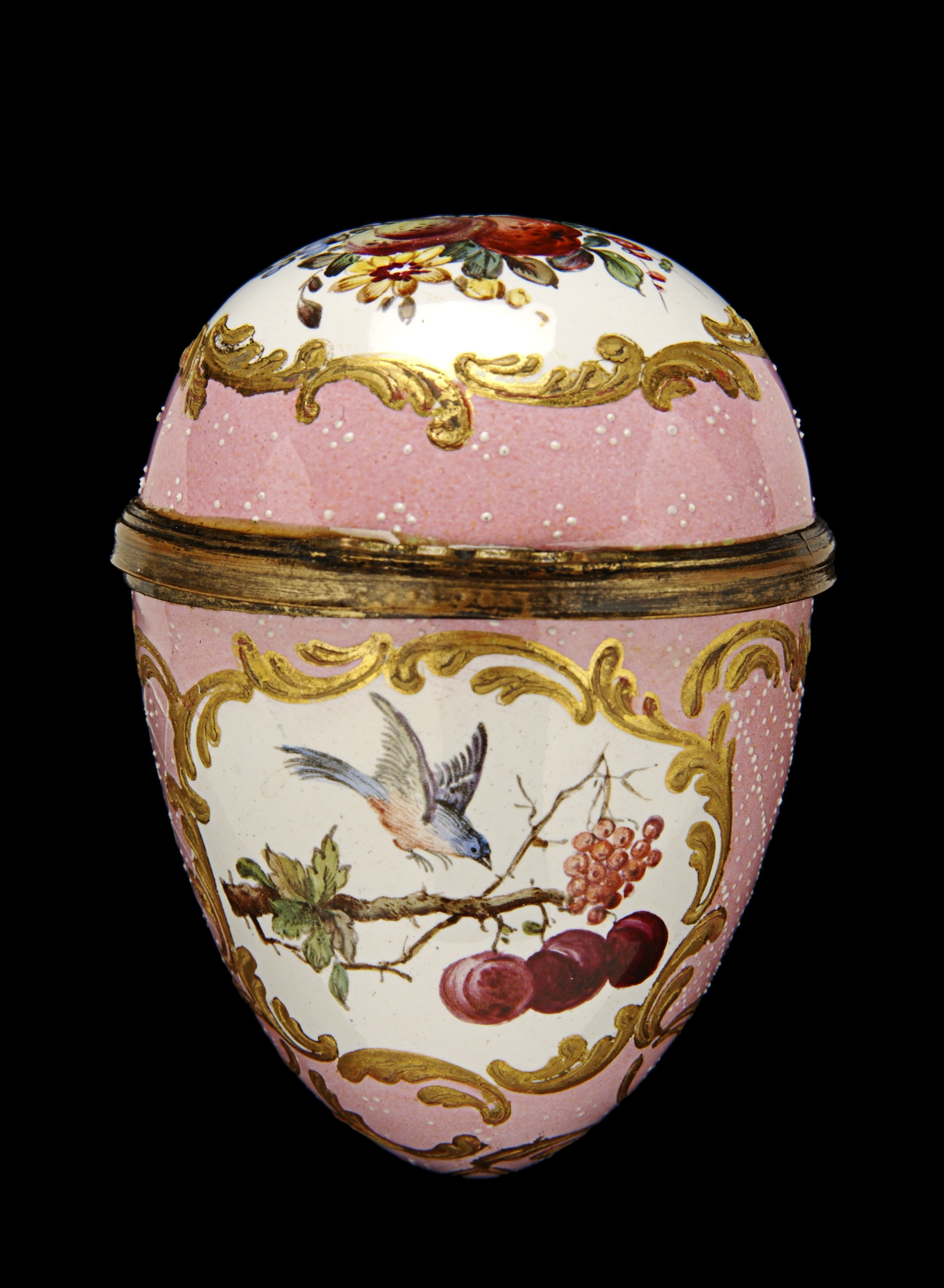
Bonbonniere (1760–1775)

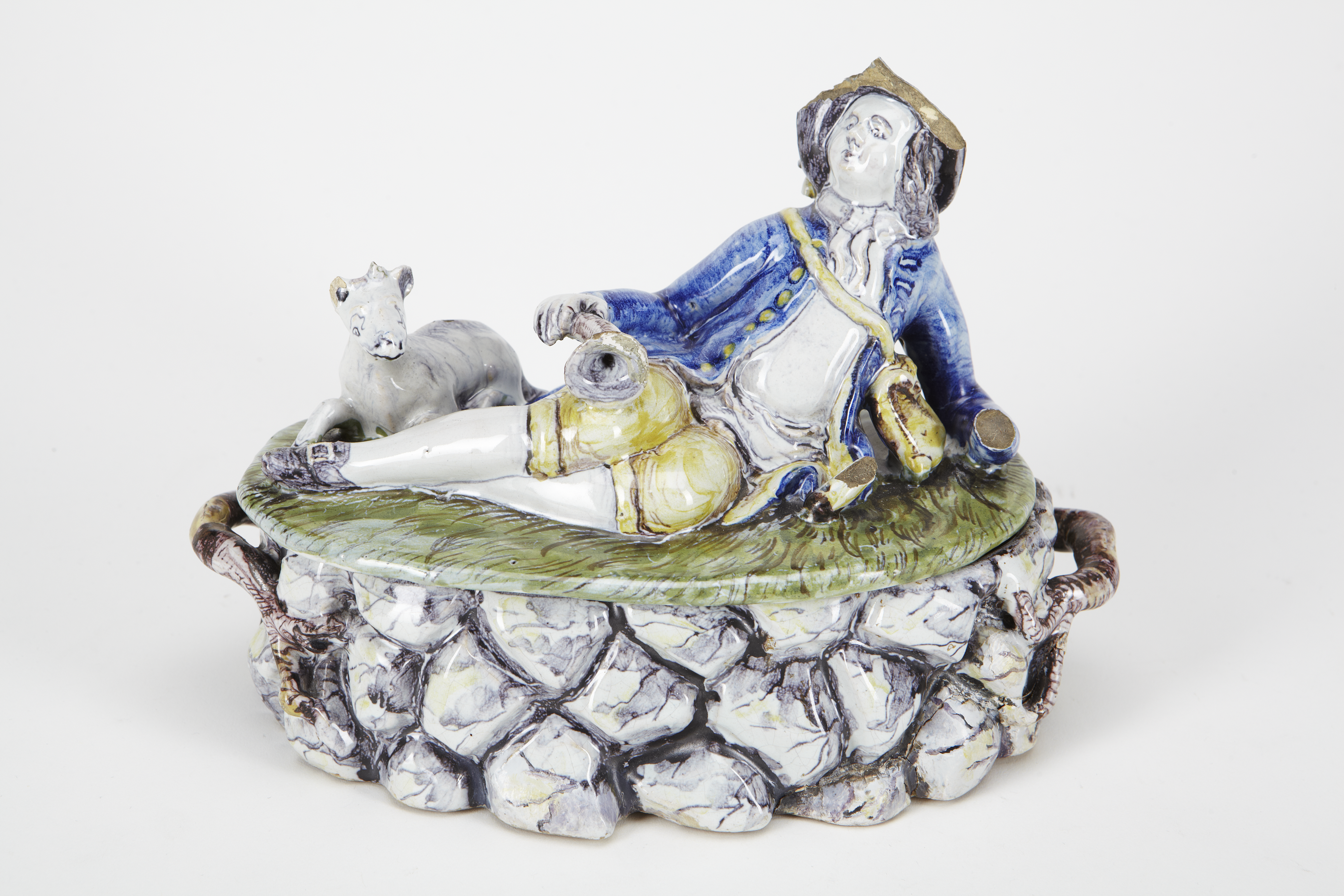
Bonbonniere (1773–1776)

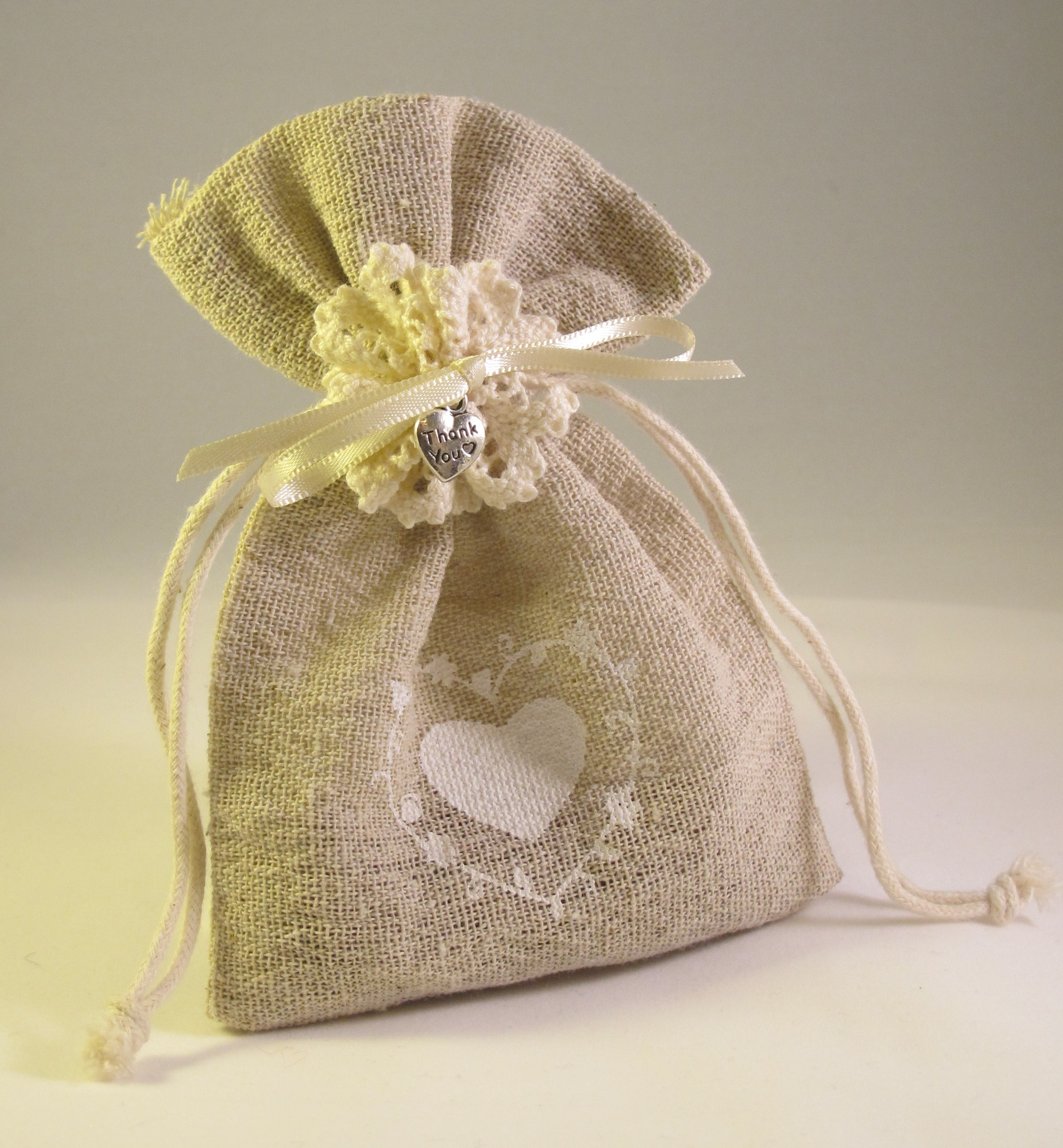
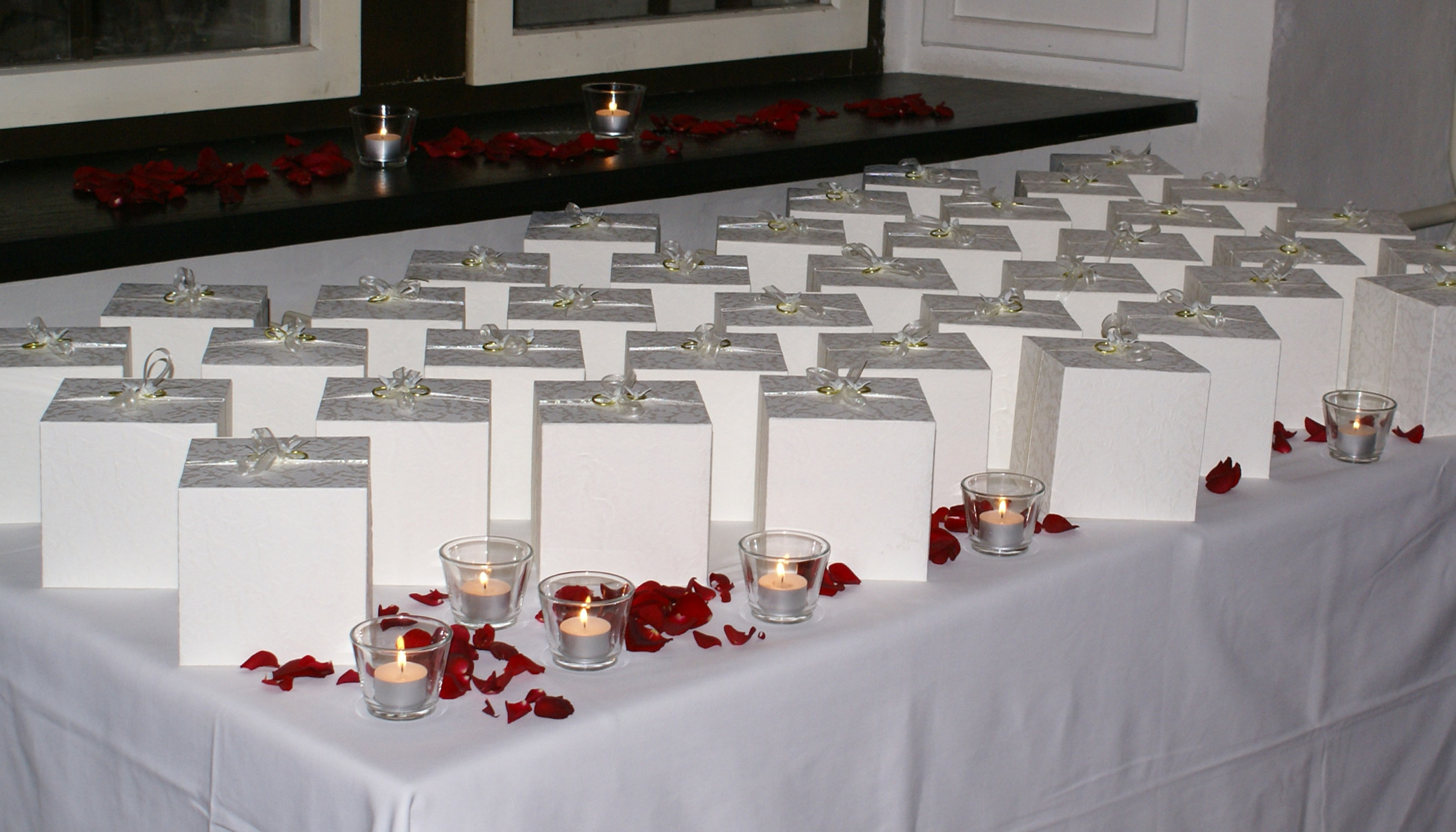
Wedding bonbonnieres

A bonbonniere or bonbonnière (from French bonbonnière [bɔ̃bɔnjɛʁ], lit. 'container of candies'), less commonly spelt bonboniere or bomboniere (Italian: [bomboˈnjɛːre], singular bomboniera [bomboˈnjɛːra]), is a small decorative container used to hold sweets. It can take various forms (box, dish, or fabric pouch) and may be offered as a party favor on special occasions such as weddings, baptisms, First Communions or confirmations. Often regarded as a precursor to the bonbonniere was the drageoir, an earlier type of container used during the Middle Ages and the Renaissance primarily for dragees (sugar-coated almonds).

When presented as a bag, a bonbonniere is typically made of tulle or satin and tied with ribbons, and contains five Jordan almonds, with the almonds symbolizing health, wealth, happiness, fertility and long life. The almonds are white for a wedding, First Communion or Confirmation; pink or light-blue for the birthday or baptism of a girl or boy; red for a graduation; and silver or gold for 25 or 50 year anniversaries. Often they are adorned with dried natural flowers or artificial flowers made of silk or paper. The bag is often given stored inside a small vessel made of silver, crystal or porcelain.

In Australia, a bonbonniere is a party favor given out at weddings, first holy communions and the like. Such gifts may take the form of a wine bottle stopper, glass vase or picture frame as well as the more traditional sugared almonds in decorative bags.

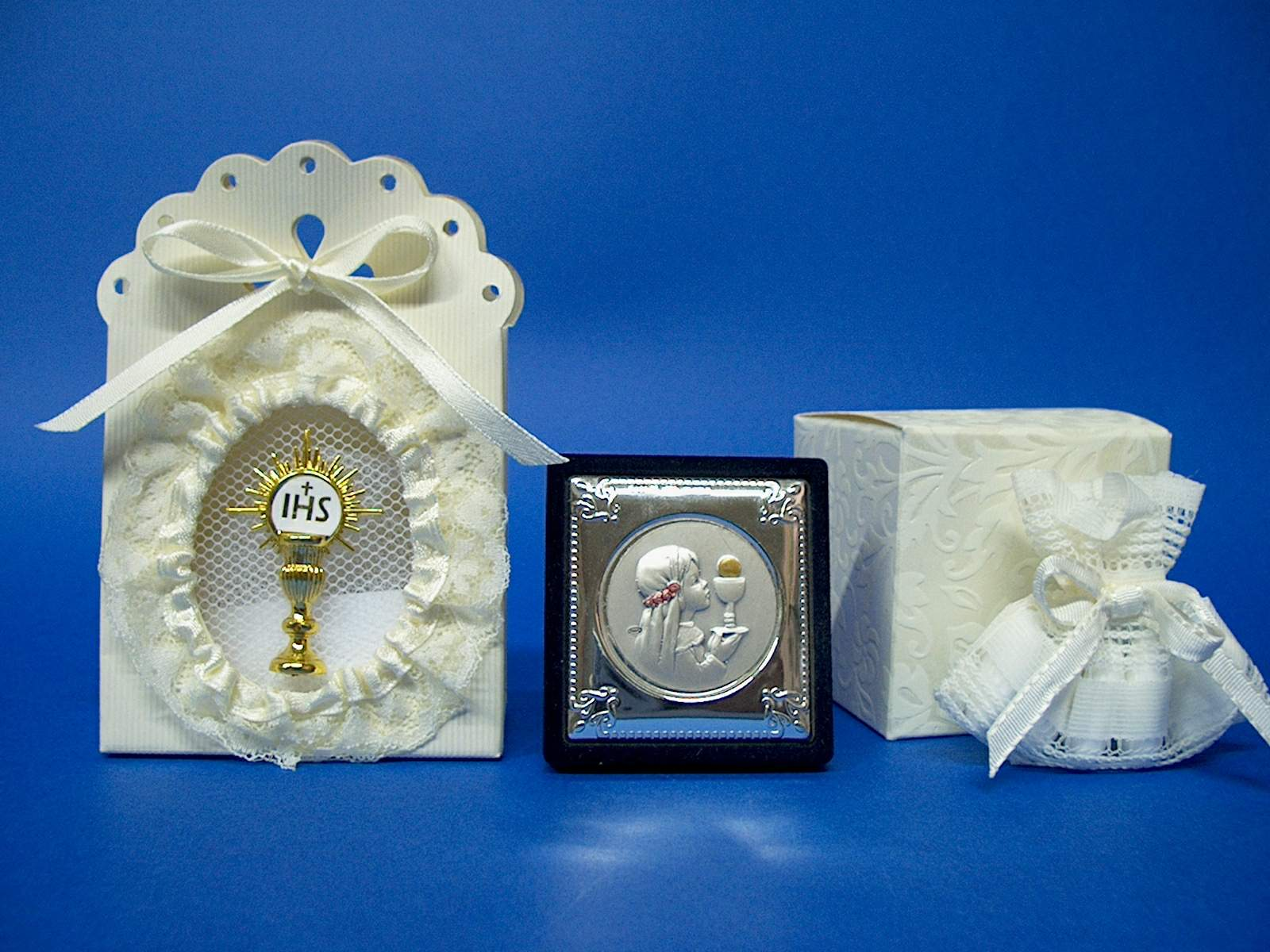
Sample of Italian favors used for First Holy Communion

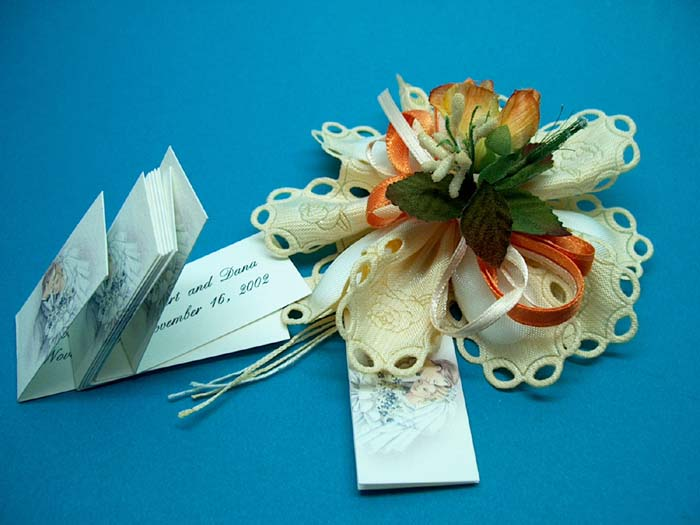
Sample of Italian favor made with special ribbon containing 5 sugared almonds. Note the printed tags

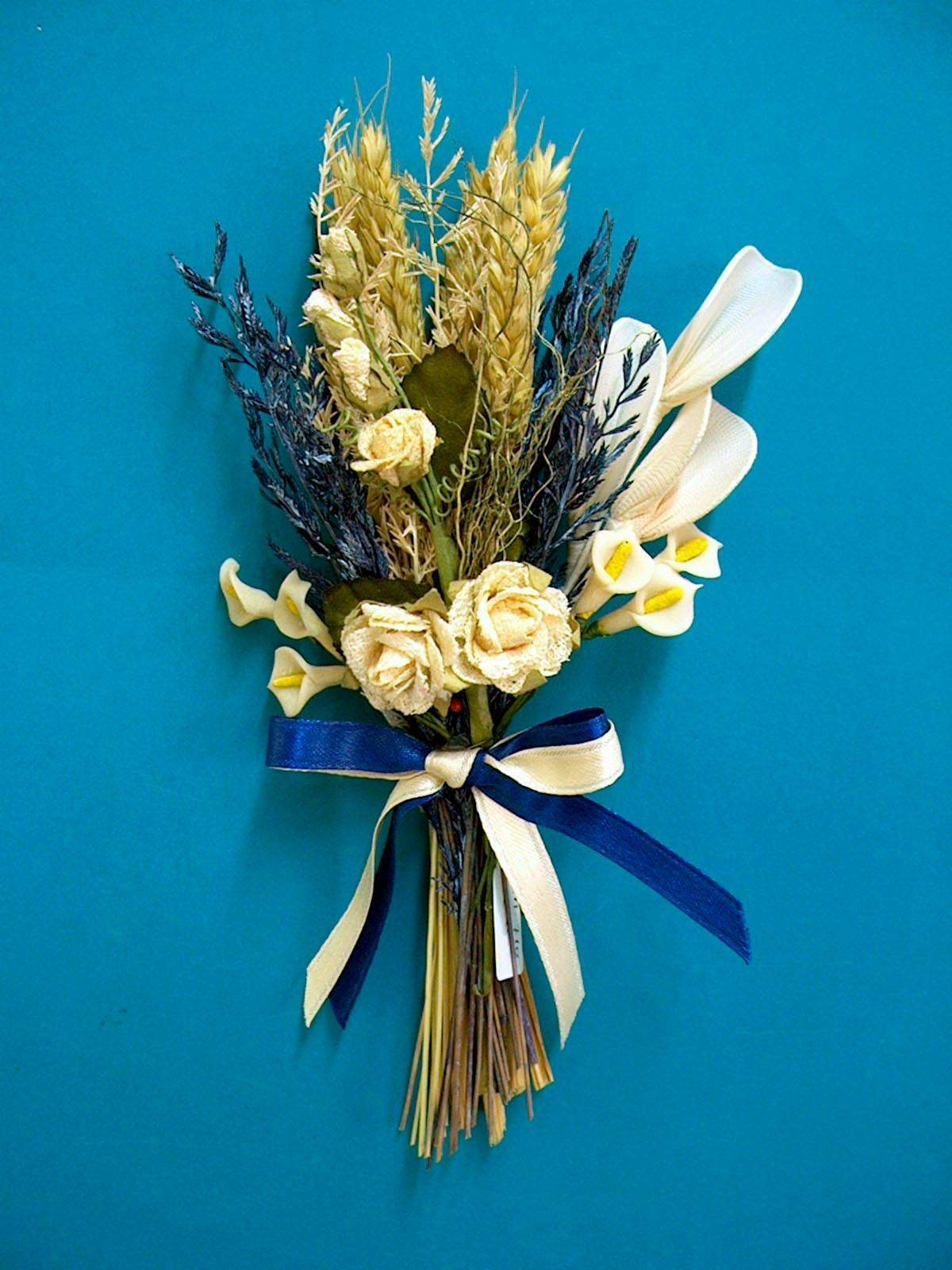
Sample of Italian favors made with dried flowers

== Torta Bomboniera ==
Another type of bonbonniere is the Favor Cake or "Torta Bomboniera" as it is called in Italy. It is made using little carton boxes forming one or more tiers of a "cake". Inside each box are sugared almonds and a card printed with the data of ceremony (names, date etc.). On each box is glued one of several types of fine objects made of many materials.

Some samples are below, for various ceremonies:

Favor Cake with 40 carton boxes and porcelain flowers, usable for wedding etc.

Favor Cake with 40 carton boxes and Tweety figurines, usable for Birthday, Baptism, First Holy Communion etc.

Favor Cake with 40 carton boxes and glass shells hand-made in Murano (Venice, Italy)

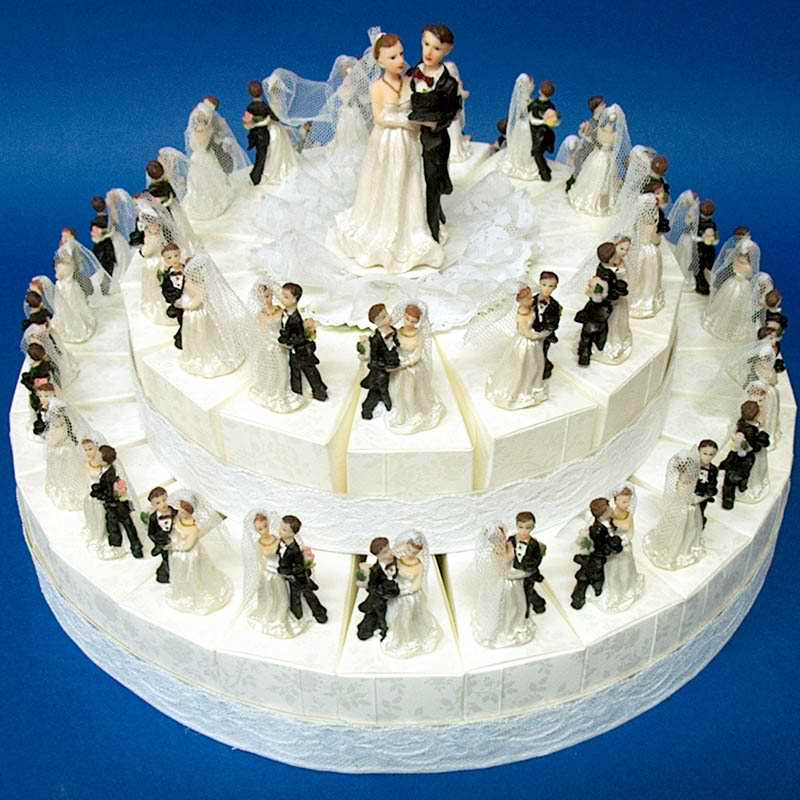
Favor Cake for wedding, with 40 carton boxes and figurines of bride & groom

Favor Cake with 40 carton boxes with Minnie Mouse and Daisy Duck figurines, for birthday or Christening

Favor Cake with 24 carton boxes and glass sailor ships

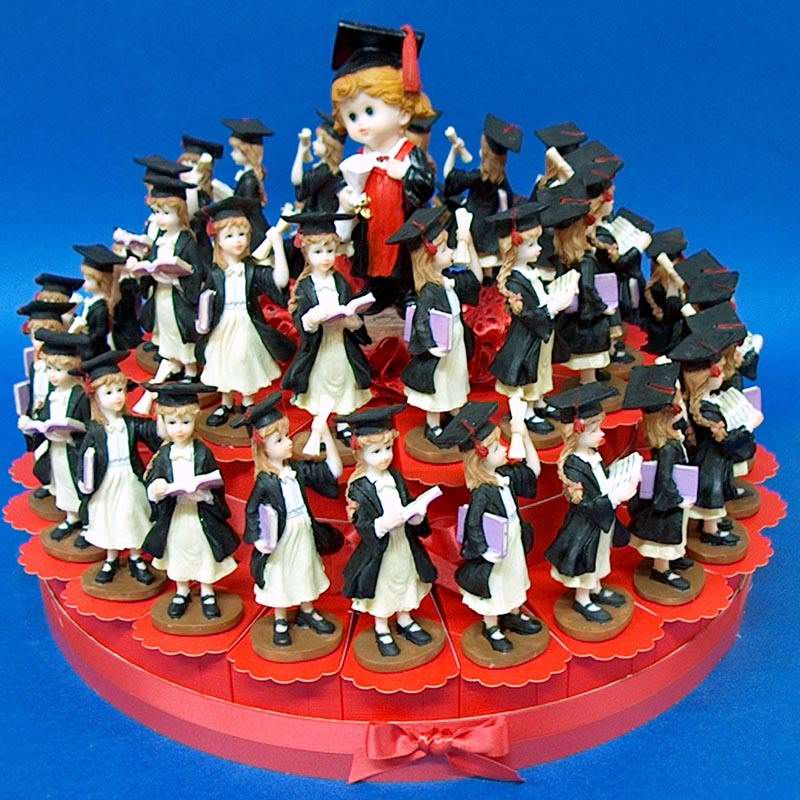
Favor Cake with 40 red carton boxes and figurines of graduates

Favor Cake with 40 carton boxes and glass earth globes

Another type is made using porcelain boxes shaped and hand decorated like an edible bignè or cream puff. Inside each box there are five sugared almonds and a card printed with the date of the ceremony. Italians call this type the "Pasticceria Artigianale in Porcellana" (Porcelain Artisan Pastries).

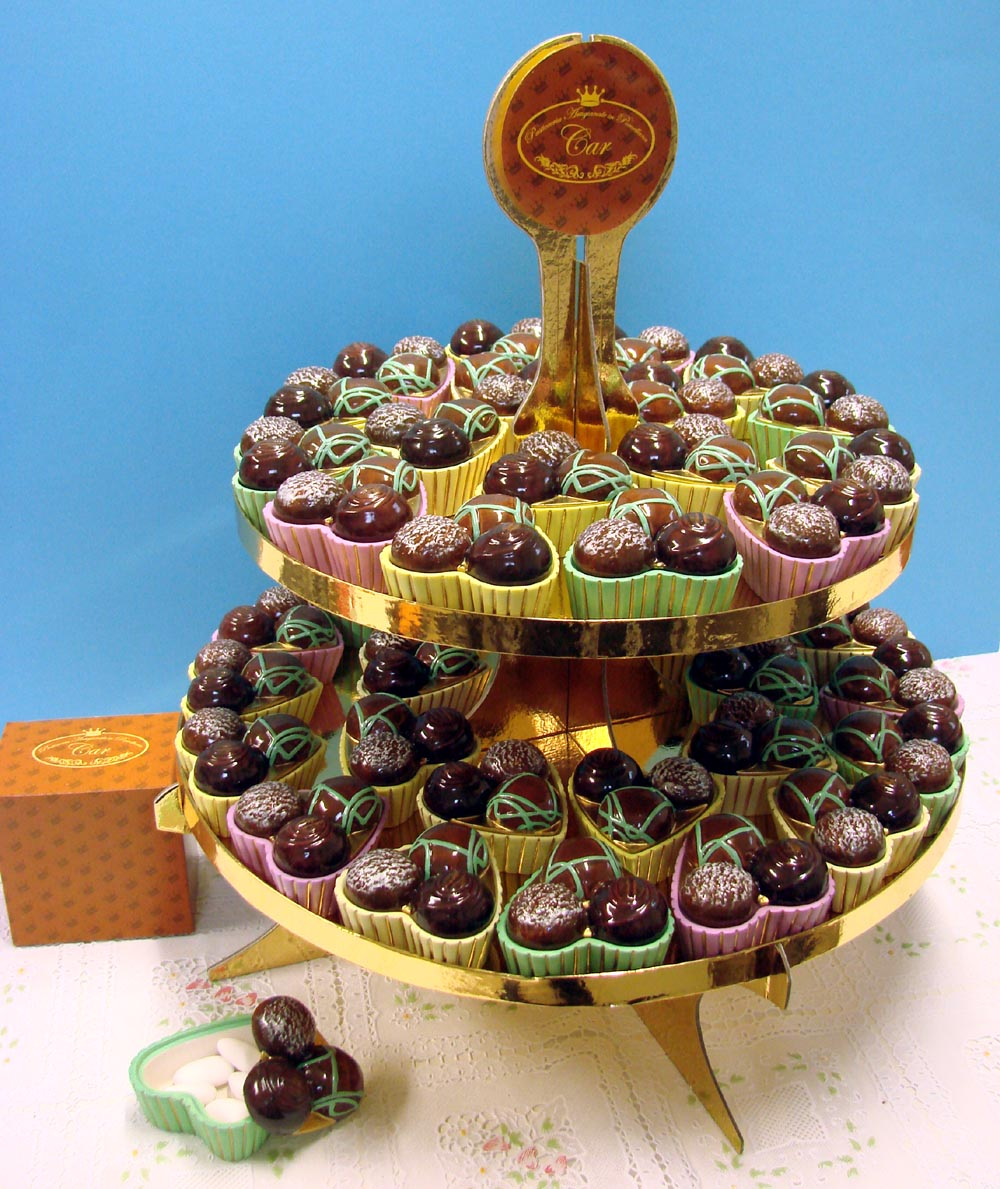
Favor Cake with porcelain boxes and sugared almonds, heart shaped

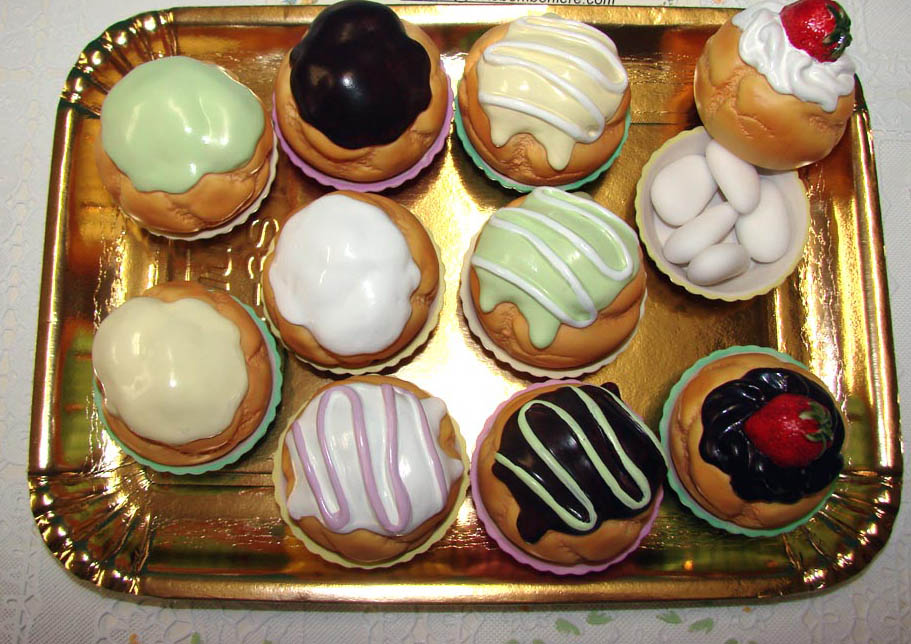
Porcelain boxes with sugared almonds, round shaped

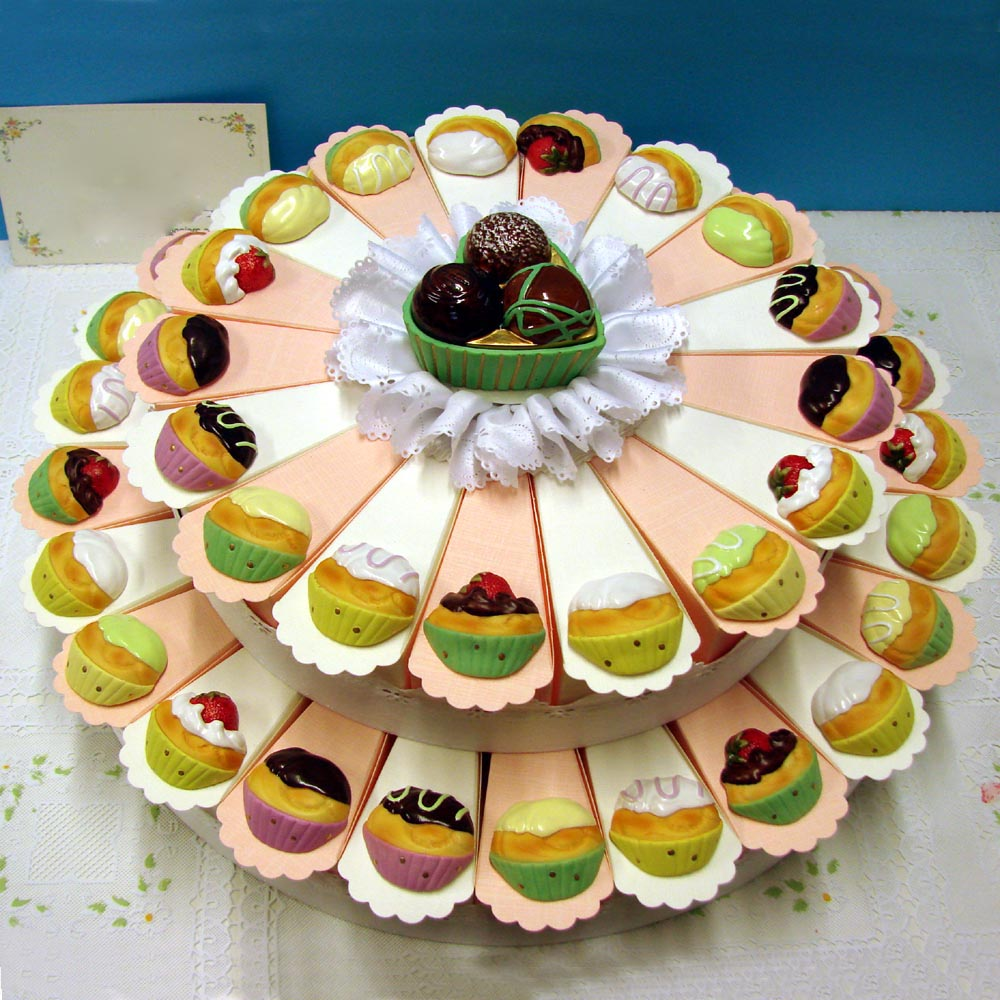
Favor Cake made with carton boxes and porcelain magnets formed like cream puff and central porcelain box. Inside carton boxes there are the sugared almonds.
