= BioGnost =

BioGnost Ltd.

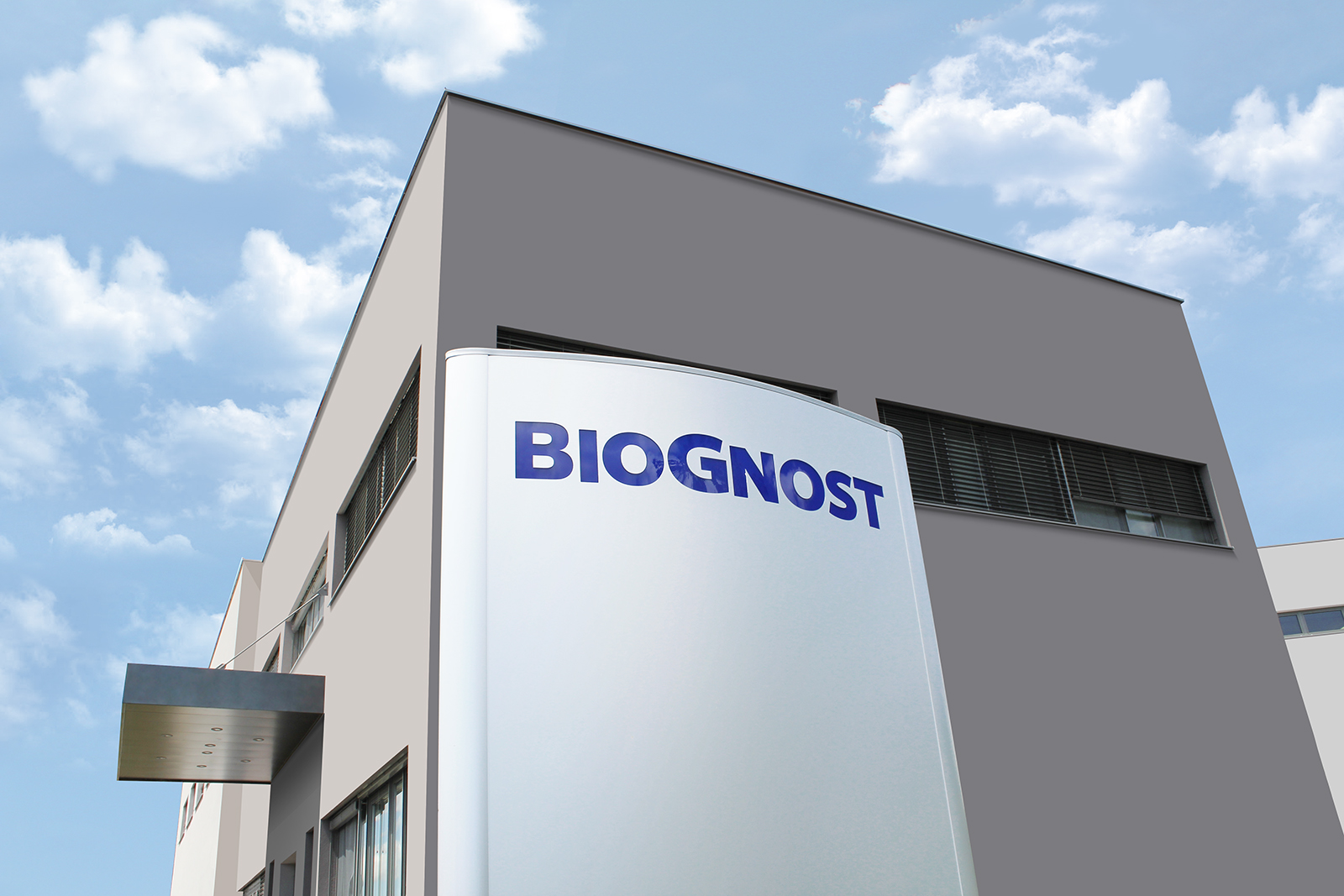
- Industry: Pharmaceutics, health industry, biomedical science
- Founded: 1990
- Founder: mr. sc. Ivan Marchiotti, MD, Mirjana Marchiotti-Ulip, MPharm
- Headquarters: Međugorska 59, Zagreb, Croatia
- Number of employees: 65
- Subsidiaries: BioGnost S, BioGnost BH
- Website: www.biognost.com

BioGnost Ltd. is a medical products company founded in 1990 by mr. sc. Ivan Marchiotti, MD and Mirjana Marchiotti-Ulip, Mpharm with its headquarters located in Zagreb, Croatia.

The company is a market leader in Southeastern Europe in manufacturing of reagents for histopathology, cytology, hematology, microbiology as well as rapid immunochromatographic tests along with other product ranges.

== Company history ==
1997 - Croatian Ministry of Health grants BioGnost the license for manufacturing of in vitro medical diagnostic products. Start of blood typing serum manufacturing. First brand (BioGnost) registered and trademarked with the Croatian Intellectual Property Office. The company soon started manufacturing rapid immunochromatographic tests for detection of pregnancy, drug metabolites and infective diseases.

1998 - First distribution rights signed with foreign partners.

2000 - Company starts with distribution of rapid tests for drug metabolites detection. AbuGnost and DOA MultiGnost home test use and market share increases. That can be attributed to numerous newspaper articles and interviews given by mr. sc. Ivan Marchiotti, MD.

2003 - Implementation of ISO 9001 quality management system standard. The process of marketing over 240 registered brand name products started, and a company representative office was opened in Belgrade, Serbia.

2005 - BioGnost becomes the first company in Croatia to implement ISO 13485 standard.

2006 - BioGnost becomes the first company in Croatia to implement the system of work environment protection from harmful influence of alcohol and illegal drugs. It was also one of the exhibitors at the 34th International medical, pharmaceutical, laboratory and rehabilitation, optics and Dental Equipment fair in Zagreb.

2007 - National Colorectal Cancer Screening Program launched by distributing HemoGnost tests. The cooperation continues onward.

2010 - 18 BioGnost product brands registered. Sister company BioGnost S founded in Belgrade, Serbia.

2011 - Sister company BioGnost BH was founded in Sarajevo, Bosnia and Herzegovina.

2012 - The company’s headquarters moved from Savica Šanci Center for Small Business (Ulica Savica 147) to the new commercial and manufacturing building at the present location (Medjugorska 59). Diabetes sales range launched.

2013 - First-time participation at the world’s largest medical expo - Medica in Dusseldorf, Germany. That resulted in a significant increase in foreign contacts and a rising number of new successful business partnerships.

2014 - BioGnost optimizes manufacturing of ten BioMount covering media and eight different immersion oils for microscopic analysis. BioGnost team exhibited products from histopathology, immunohematology and rapid diagnostic tests for the second time at Medica Fair held in Dusseldorf, further improving cooperation with international companies.

2015 - New products developed and added to the product portfolio, among which CryoFix Gel is highlighted. BioGnost exhibited for the third time at Medica Fair in Dusseldorf and enhanced business cooperation with existing business partners.

2016 - BioGnost’s participation in the IRCRO Project resulted in development of 10 special staining kits for histopathology. Participation in the CEKOM Project to develop immunohistochemistry products including its first product named LeukoGnost. Start of OEM manufacturing for foreign partners. For the fourth time BioGnost's team showcased products at Medica Fair in Dusseldorf.

2017 - Company exhibits for the first time at Medlab Middle East Expo in Dubai. BioGnost receives EU funding for product certification.

2018 - BioGnost’s presence as exhibitors at Medica trade fair in Dusseldorf continues. Participation is co-financed by the European Union with the aim of increasing the- company’s export market share. Exhibiting at the Medlab Middle East in Dubai for the second time.

2019 - BioGnost finished equipping the northwest and southeast wing of Sveti Duh Clinical Hospital in Zagreb significantly increasing quality of healthcare that the hospital provides. At Medlab Middle East Expo in Dubai, relations with new distributors were established, which had a positive impact on the company’s export results. BioGnost also exhibited for the seventh time at Medica, world’s largest medical expo in Dusseldorf, Germany.

2020 - Only exhibitor from Croatia at Medlab Middle East Expo in Dubai. Activities start on two new EU funded projects. One project aimed to innovate production and delivery activities and the other focused on developing innovative products in immunohistochemistry.

2021 - As part of a new EU project, investments were made in the green and digital transition of the company.

2022 - Work on EU projects continues, increasing sales in domestic and international markets and gaining market share.

2023 - Successful completion of another EU co-financed project which further innovated production and delivery activities. The company's products were presented at the Medlab Middle East Expo in Dubai.

== Awards and recognitions ==
- Croatian Kuna award – 2000, 2002
- Golden Kuna award – 2003. The most successful company in Zagreb in the category of small-sized companies
- The best small Croatian business enterprise – 2004. Awarded by the Ministry of Economy
- ARCA 2004 – Gold medal for diagnostic devices
- 3rd European Day of the Entrepreneur 2006 (EDE) – 3rd most promising company among 150 small and medium-sized companies
- AAA Gold Creditworthiness Certificate of Excellence - Award received in 2023 for 2020, 2021 and 2022. Dun & Bradstreet certificate
- AAA Platinum Creditworthiness Certificate of Excellence - Award received in 2023 for 2020, 2021 and 2022. Dun & Bradstreet certificate
