= Debit (grape) =

Variety of grape

- Grape (Vitis)
- Color of berry skin: White
- Notable regions: Dalmatia, Croatia

Debit is a white wine grape variety grown primarily along the Northern & Central Dalmatian Coast of Croatia. The fruit are medium-sized golden yellow color and in clusters of medium size or large.

== History ==
According to the Vitis International Variety Catalogue the currently believed to have originated in Croatia. However, the old name of "Puljižinac" suggests that the origin may originally be Italian.

The white Italian grape variety bombino bianco has Debit as one of its confirmed synonyms but it is not known if the two varieties are related.
