= Bogdanuša =

Variety of grape

- Grape (Vitis)
- Color of berry skin: Blanc
- Species: Vitis vinifera
- Also called: See list of synonyms
- Origin: Croatia
- Notable regions: Croatia
- Notable wines: Bogdanuša
- VIVC number: 1506

Bogdanuša is a white grape variety, which is grown on the Croatian island of Hvar, where it originated on the Stari Grad Plain. Wines from this grape tend to be dry with a green-yellow to golden color and from 12% alcohol on up.

Premium quality Bogdanuša wines are produced by Dalmacijavino, Hvar Hills Winery and Plančić Winery. There are also a few small wineries that produce an outstanding Bogdanuša, Vina Ventus in Vrisnk and Pavicic in Vrabanj.

== Origins ==
Some genetics tests has been done for proving that Bogdanuša was brought to the island by the Greeks in the 4th century. However, the results are not conclusive.

As the wine was drunk at religious festivals, it's believed that it gots the name Bogdanuša (given by God) for that reason.

== Production ==
Bogdanuša grapes only can be used to produce wine when they grow on deep, fertile, and moist soils as the soil of Stari Grad Plain. In other locations in Dalmacija, the grape can't be used for producing wine. For that reason, it has never been produced in large quantities.

Between famous local producers in Hvar are Carić, PZ Svirce, Hvar Hills and Plančić. Under the name “Kaštelet bijeli” is sold a blend made with Bogdanušam, Trbljan Bijeli, and Maraština.

== Synonyms ==
Bogdanuša is also known under the synonyms Bogdanoucha, Bogdanuša Bijela, Bogdanuša Mala, Bogdanuša Vela, Bogdanuša Vela Mladinka, Bojadanuša, Bojdanuša, Mladeinka, Vrbanjka, and Vrbanjska.
