= Vindija (company) =

Croatian food company

Vindija, d.d.
- Company type: Public company (dioničko društvo)
- Industry: food products
- Founded: 1959
- Founder: Dragutin Drk
- Headquarters: Varaždin, Croatia
- Key people: Dragutin Drk
- Revenue: €492 million (2024)
- Number of employees: 1286
- Divisions: Koka d.d., Vindon d.o.o.
- Website: www.vindija.hr

Vindija is Croatian food company based in Varaždin. Vindija is mainly known for its dairy products and beverages.

== History ==
Vindija was founded in 1959 when the city of Varaždin needed a dairy to supply the city with fresh milk. It employed only about fifteen people.

In 1965, the dairy was integrated in to a larger company called ZPPK Kalnik. At the same time, Dragutin Drk became the director, and he remains in place today (as of 2014). The name Vindija started to be used in 1970, after the nearby Vindija Cave near Ivanec, a known archeological site, as it was assumed that the cave had been used as a natural environment for ripening cheeses.

In early 1970, Kalnik's slaughterhouse and meat production facilities became part of a separate company called PPK Koka Varaždin, while the rest of the company became part of a cluster with the company Zagrebačka mljekara from Zagreb. In 1972, the new company was formally renamed to OOUR Zagrebačka mljekara. In 1979, the Varaždin dairy was reconstituted again with the name RO Vindija.

In 1983, the company started to produce pudding, fermented products and desserts. In 1990, the company entered into a large investment that resulted in it becoming a major Croatian company, and at the time one of the most modern in Europe. In 1992, Vindija was awarded the title of the best company in Croatia.

The Vindija campus spreads of a total of 22,000 square metres (240,000 sq ft) and is located within the city, so it has to abide by high ecological and cleanliness standards.

Its best known brands include "Z bregov" milk products and "Vindi" juices and other beverages.

Vindija's business system is among the largest Croatian food industries, there are 13 companies in the Vindija Group, it has more than 4,000 employees, and the total revenue of the group in 2012 amounted to HRK 3 billion.

== See also ==
- List of companies of the Socialist Federal Republic of Yugoslavia

== Sources ==
- "Vindija d.d., Varaždin". Croatian Chamber of Economy. Archived from the original on 1 June 2013.
- Magdalenić, Branka; Ivko, Boris (November 1994). "Razvoj "Vindije"" [The development of "Vindija"]. Mljekarstvo (in Croatian). 44 (4). Zagreb: Croatian Dairy Union. ISSN 0026-704X.
