= Maraština =

Variety of grape

Maraština (Rukatac, Maraškin, Mareština, Krizol, Višana) is an indigenous white grape variety from the Dalmatian coast, recommended for all Dalmatian sub-regions, and the Croatian Coast, except Istria. On the island of Cres, it is known as krizol, and in other parts of Dalmatia it is known as rukatac. As it is widely grown, other local names exist, for example đurđevina, kačebelić, kače-debić, kukuruz, mareština, and marinkuša.

DNA analysis has shown that maraština is closely related to the Italian variety Malvasia del Chianti. Croatian dessert wine prošek also uses this grape.

== Production ==
Maraština is a variety of grape abundant and easy to cultivate. It can be found throughout the Mediterranean, including most of the Croatian coast (except for Istria). In the south of Dalmatia is called Rukatac; on Cres Island is Krizol; Višana, Malvasia del Chianti, Malvasia Bianca Lunga in Italy, Pavlos in Greece.

Only recently it was shown that Maraština is genetically the same as all those other varieties from the Mediterranean. Some experts believe that it was originated in Dalmatia and spread due to its features and quality.

Maraština can be found in the south of Croatia on the island of Hvar, Korčula, peninsula Pelješac, and Konavle region. The island of Lastovo and Mljet count with small Maraština vineyards. The region around Zadar is branding its local Maraština.

== Features ==
The grapes give high yields and have a high content of sugar when is grown in an adequate location. Traditionally, it's been used to complement other wine varieties. Because it's fragrant and fruity, it's described as "a female wine". Its color is golden yellow and it's full-bodied with hints of vanilla and quite low alcohol content. The grape is low acid. For that reason, many producers blend it with varieties that have higher acids. Around 10 °C is the preferred temperature for serving. It can be pairing with seafood, salted anchovies, various risottos, or goat cheese.
