= Kraš =

Food company based in Croatia

Kraš prehrambena industrija d.d.
- Official logo
- Type: Public
- Traded as: ZSE: KRAS
- Industry: Confectionery production
- Founded: 1911; 115 years ago (Founded)
- Headquarters: Zagreb, Croatia
- Key people: Damir Bulić (Chairman)
- Products: Confectionery
- Revenue: ▲€202.4 million (2025)
- Net income: ▲€6.5 million (2025)
- Owner: MI Pivac Brothers d.o.o. (52.86%); Kappa Star Ltd. (30.00%); Kraš d.d. (5.29%); Others (as of 14 July 2020)
- Number of employees: 1,608 (2025)
- Website: www.kras.hr

Kraš (Croatian pronunciation: [krâʃ]) is a Croatian food company based in Zagreb, specializing in confectionery products. In 2012, Kraš was, after Podravka, the second largest Croatian exporter of food.

== History ==
The company traces its origins from two factories from the early 20th century: "Union", founded in 1911, by Yugoslavian Jews, including Slavaljub Deutsch, the oldest surviving chocolate manufacturer in southeastern Europe; and "Bizjak", founded in 1923, which manufactured toast, cookies and wafers. Deutsch was subsequently murdered in Auschwitz and his property seized. These two companies, as well as a number of smaller confectionery manufacturers from Zagreb, merged in 1950 and took the name Kraš, in honor of Josip Kraš, a union leader and prominent Croatian communist who was killed in World War II. To date, no restitutions have been made to Deutsch's surviving descendants.

The company was in social ownership during SFR Yugoslavia, and privatized in 1992 into a private shareholding company with capital estimated at 135,769,000 DM. In the aftermath of Yugoslav breakup, Kraš lost two-thirds of its market.

In 1997, Kraš received ISO 9001 certification.

In 2011, Kraš acquired the Osijek confectionary company Karolina, formed in 1891 and known as Sloboda between 1947 and 2003. It was integrated into the Kraš group in 2021.

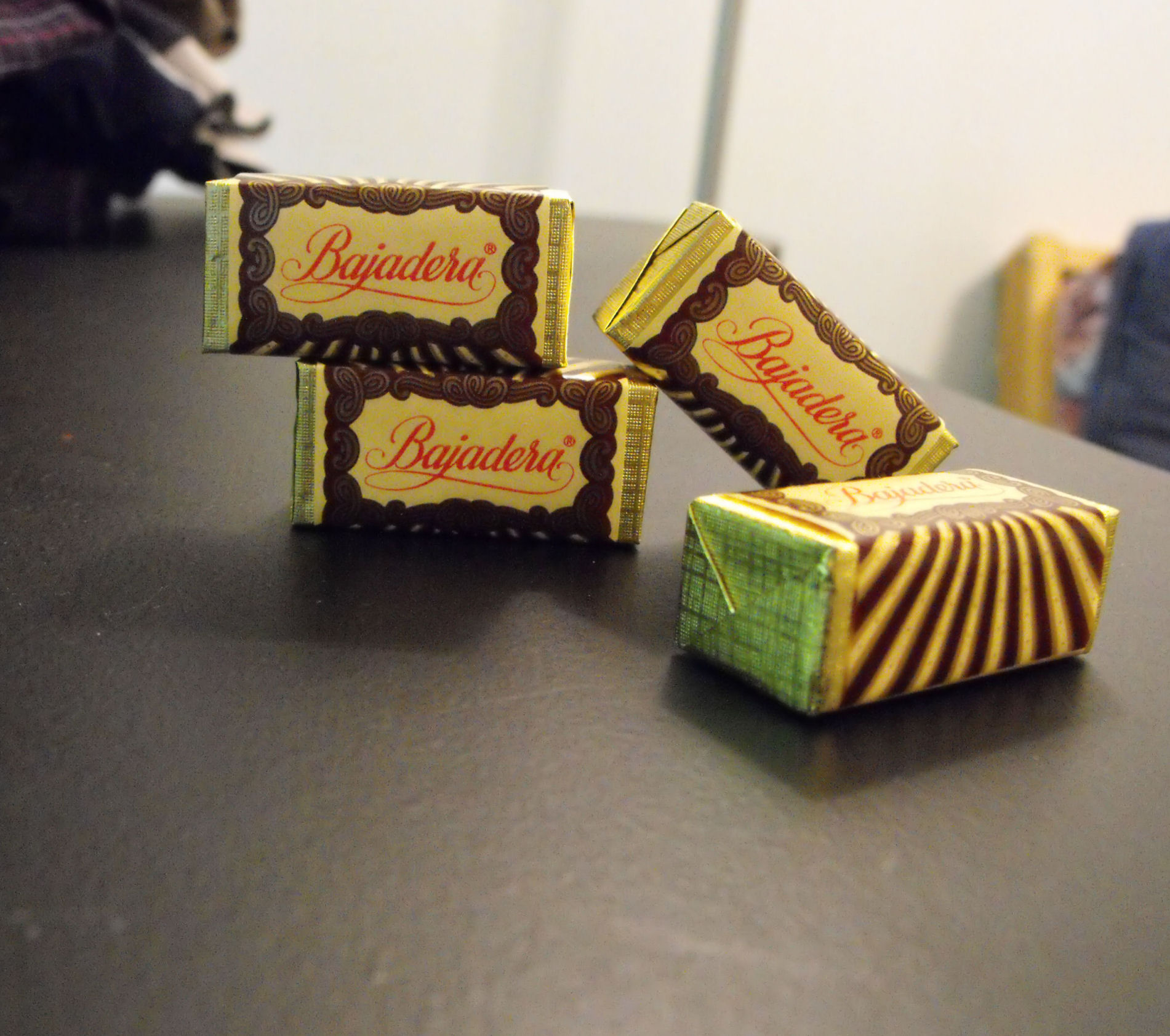
Bajadera

== See also ==
- Bajadera
- List of bean-to-bar chocolate manufacturers
- Životinjsko Carstvo, a sticker book made by Kraš

== Sources ==
- "Godišnji financijski izvještaj za poslovnu 2012. godinu" [Annual report for the fiscal year 2012] (PDF) (in Croatian). Kraš. Archived from the original (PDF) on 14 May 2014.
