= Podravka =

Croatian food company

Podravka d.d.
- Official logo
- Type: Public company
- Traded as: ZSE: PODR
- ISIN: HRPODRRA0004
- Industry: Food and beverages
- Founded: 1934; 92 years ago
- Founder: Marijan & Matija Wolf
- Headquarters: Koprivnica, Croatia
- Area served: Worldwide
- Key people: Martina Dalić, ph.d. (Chairman); Željko Vukina (President of the Supervisory Board)
- Products: Food seasoning, soups, ready-to-serve meals, half-ready meals, vegetables, meat products, canned fish, sauces, tomato products, baby food, breakfast cereals, sweet products, ice-cream, bakery products, mill products, frozen products, side dishes, beverages, fresh meat.
- Revenue: ▲€1.04 billion (2025)
- Net income: ▲€74.6 million (2025)
- Total assets: ▲€778.10 million (2023)
- Total equity: ▲€410.99 million (2023)
- Number of employees: 6,163 (2023)
- Website: www.podravka.hr

Podravka d.d. is a Croatian food company based in Koprivnica. Founded in 1934, today it is one of the largest food companies in Southeast Europe.

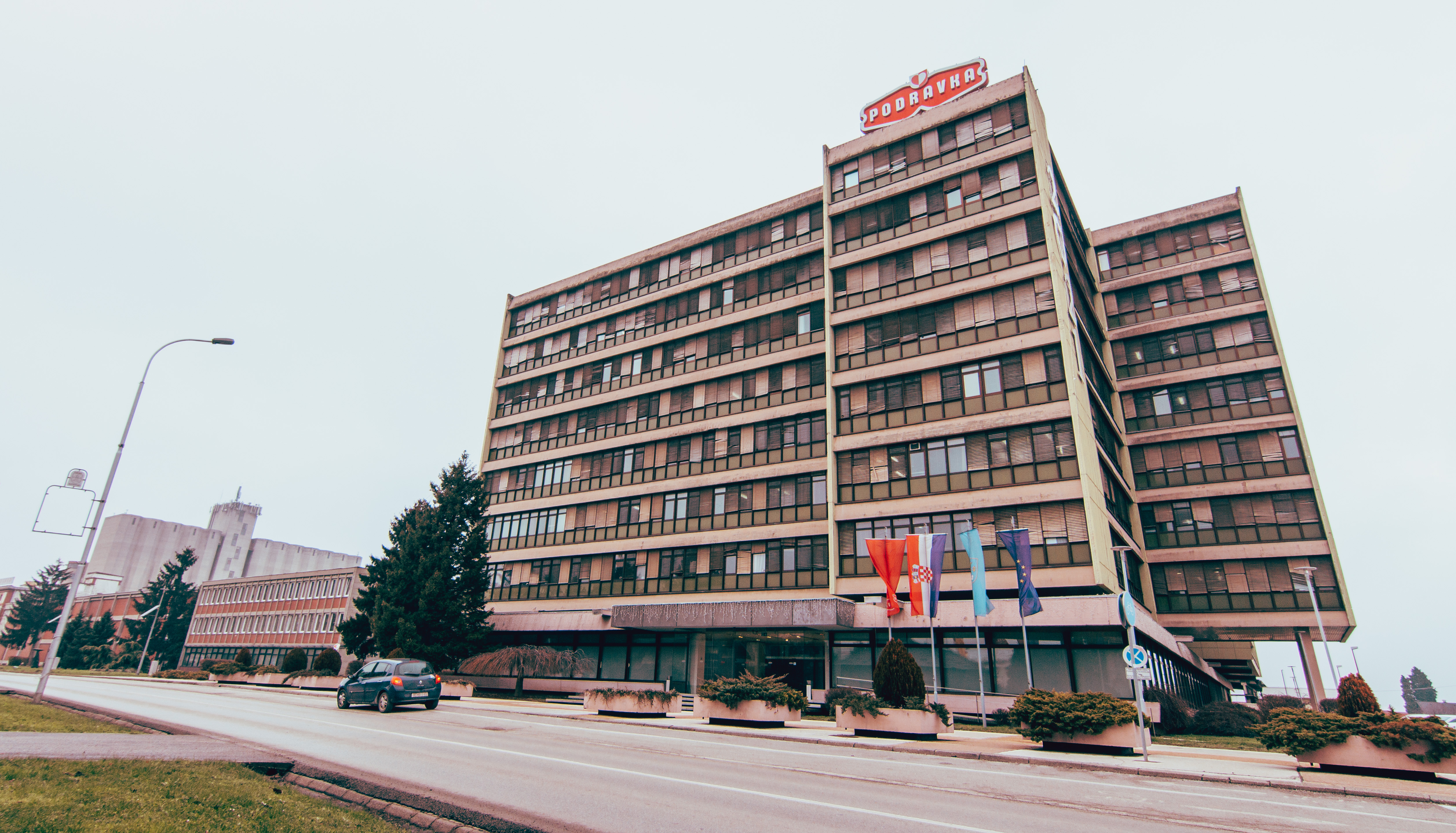
Podravka headquarters in Koprivnica

== History ==
Former company logo (until January 2024)

=== 1934–1990 ===
The brothers Marijan and Matija Wolf founded the company on 14 June 1934. At the time, the firm was a fruit factory. When the communists under Tito took power in 1947 the company was nationalized and received its current name.

In 1949, Podravka started producing fruit jam. In 1952 new products were released on the market: once a fruit factory Podravka now started producing candy, mustard, ketchup, fruit brandy and canned meat. The production of instant soups started in 1957. The rooster on the chicken soup became a symbol in Yugoslavia.

In 1959 Vegeta was released. Today, the condiment is sold in more than 40 countries.

In 1967, Podravka had its first cooperation with international companies and exported Vegeta to Hungary and the Soviet Union for the first time. After founding the subsidiary Belupo in 1972 Podravka started producing pharmaceuticals in Ludbreg and starting 1981 in Danica as well.

=== 1990–present ===
After Croatia regained independence, Podravka was privatized in 1993 and transformed into a stock company. The trade of Podravka shares at the Zagreb Stock Exchange started in 1998. With the 130 million euros gained from the stock market launch, three new factories were built.

In 2000 new production sites in Koprivnica and Poland were opened for Vegeta. In the same year Podravka took over the exclusive sale of Barilla products in Poland and one year later the exclusive sale for Kraš in Hungary. In honour of Zlata Bartl, who was responsible for the development of Vegeta in 1959, the company created the Zlata-Bartl-Foundation in 2001.

Podravka took over Ital-Ice and the Czech company Lagris in 2002. That same year Podravka signed partnership agreements with Nestlé, Heinz and Unilever and transformed the pharmaceutical subsidiary Belupo into a stock company.

In 2003, Podravka opened a new manufactory in the industrial zone of Danica. Three years later, it took over the brand EVA.

In 2007, Podravka acquired the companies Warzywko and Perfekt in Poland and Lero in Croatia. That same year, the Vienna Stock Exchange added Podravka to the CROX-Index. Podravka signed a merchandising agreement with Paramount Pictures in 2008. That same year it took over the brands Čokolešnik and Čoko.

In 2009 a financial scandal led to the arrest of several board members under charges of corruption 35 million Euros in company funds was secretly channeled in an attempt to acquire a large stake in Podravka. The Croatian Deputy Prime Minister and former Podravka supervisory board member Damir Polančec resigned his government post.

In 2009 Podravka acquired Belsad and opened a new logistics center in Dugopolje.

In 2010, Podravka products were produced in the United States for the first time.

In 2012 Zvonimir Mršić became Podravka's chief executive officer and Dubravko Štimac was elected chairman of the supervisory board.

In 2013, the company opened a Food innovation center in cooperation with the Ruđer Bošković Institute. In the same year, Podravka signed an agreement with the Croatian spirituous beverages' producer Badel 1862 for exclusive distribution of Badel products in Slovenia.

In 2014, Podravka took over the fish processing company Mirna and acquired a 51.55% majority stake in Slovenian food company Žito in 2015.

== Consumer brands ==
Podravka markets its products under brand names including:

- Vegeta – an original condiment which is a mixture primarily of salt with flavour enhancers, spices and various vegetables. It was developed in 1959 by Bosnian Croat scientist Zlata Bartl and her team, and is sold worldwide. It is produced by Podravka, and two Vegeta licensees from Austria and Hungary. There have been around 50 instances of other companies attempting to reproduce the product. Vegeta was conceived in 1958 in Podravka's laboratories. The product was first sold in Yugoslavia in 1959 as "Vegeta 40". In 1967 Vegeta was first exported to Hungary and the USSR and is now sold in around 40 countries worldwide. There is also a "no MSG added" version for those avoiding monosodium glutamate.
- Warzywko – a condiment similar to Vegeta, sold in Poland
- Eva – sardines, tuna, mackerel & herring
- Tallianetta – pasta meals
- Vital Fini-Mini – small soups
- Fant – half ready-to-serve meals
- Belsad – marmalades and jams
- Sms – oils
- Provita – cereals
- Čokolino and Lino – food for small children
- Čokolešnik and Čoko – food for small children
- Dolcela – cremes
- Lero – juices
- Kviki – salted snacks

Podravka also produces pickled vegetables and Ajvar relish.

== See also ==
- List of mustard brands
