= Eurochambres =

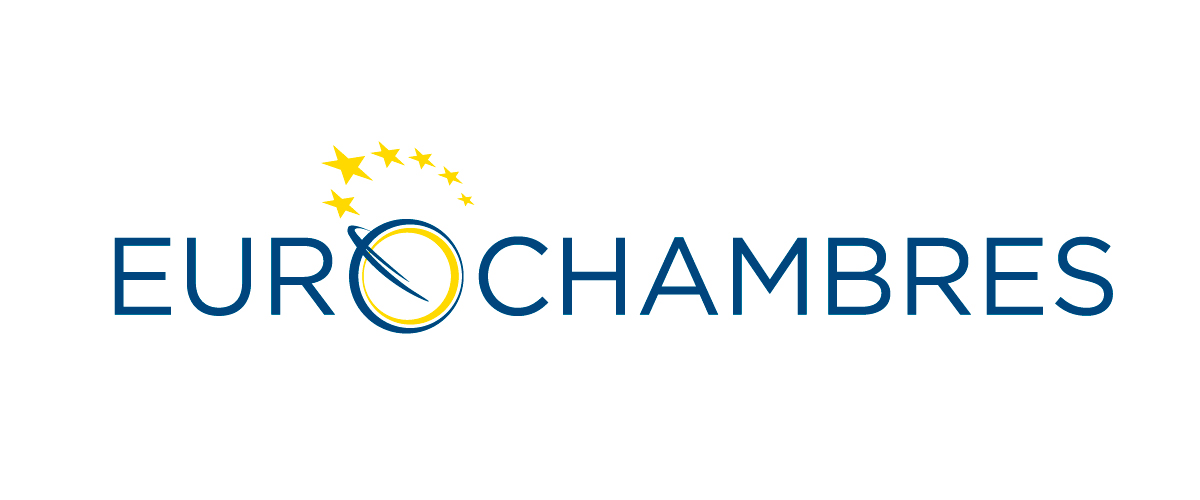
Eurochambres logo

Eurochambres is the Association of European Chambers of Commerce and Industry. Established in 1958 as a direct response to the creation of the European Economic Community. Eurochambres acts as the eyes, ears and voice of the Chambers and business community. Eurochambres represents more than 20 million businesses through its members and a network of 1700 regional and local chambers across Europe. Eurochambres is the leading voice for the broad business community at EU level, building on chambers’ strong connections with the grass roots economy and their hands-on support to entrepreneurs. Chambers’ member businesses – over 93% of which are SMEs – employ over 120 million people.

== History ==
Eurochambres was founded on 28 February 1958 as the "Conférence Permanente des Chambres de Commerce et d’Industrie de la European Economic Community (CEE) by six members to promote chamber’s views on the unification of national legislation at European level and to contribute to the development of European cooperation. In 1977, Eurochambres became an international non-profit organisation in Belgium. Since then, the network has progressively expanded to include national associations and transnational organisations of chambers from across an enlarged Europe.

Among Eurochambres' flagship initiatives is the European Parliament of Enterprises™, organised in cooperation with the European Parliament. Launched in 2008, the initiative brings together hundreds of European entrepreneurs and business representatives, providing them with the opportunity to debate and vote on issues affecting Europe's business environment. Further editions were held in 2010, 2014, 2016, 2018, 2023, and 2025.

Another major Eurochambres initiative is the Eurochambres Congress, which brings together chamber leaders, business representatives and policymakers to discuss key economic and policy challenges facing European businesses, exchange views on the future of Europe's economy and strengthen cooperation across the chamber network.

Eurochambres also carries out a broad range of policy and advocacy activities representing the interests of European businesses and chambers at European level. Its work focuses on the priorities identified by its members, including issues related to competitiveness, the business environment and the wider economic and regulatory framework. The Eurochambres Economic Survey is an important element of this work, providing regular analysis of business expectations and economic trends across the European chamber network and informing Eurochambres' policy positions and advocacy.

In addition to its policy and advocacy role, Eurochambres manages European projects, including initiatives supported by EU funding, working with chambers and other partners to implement programmes that support European businesses and regional and cross-border cooperation. These activities complement its representation and advocacy work by translating European policy priorities into practical initiatives.

== Presidency ==
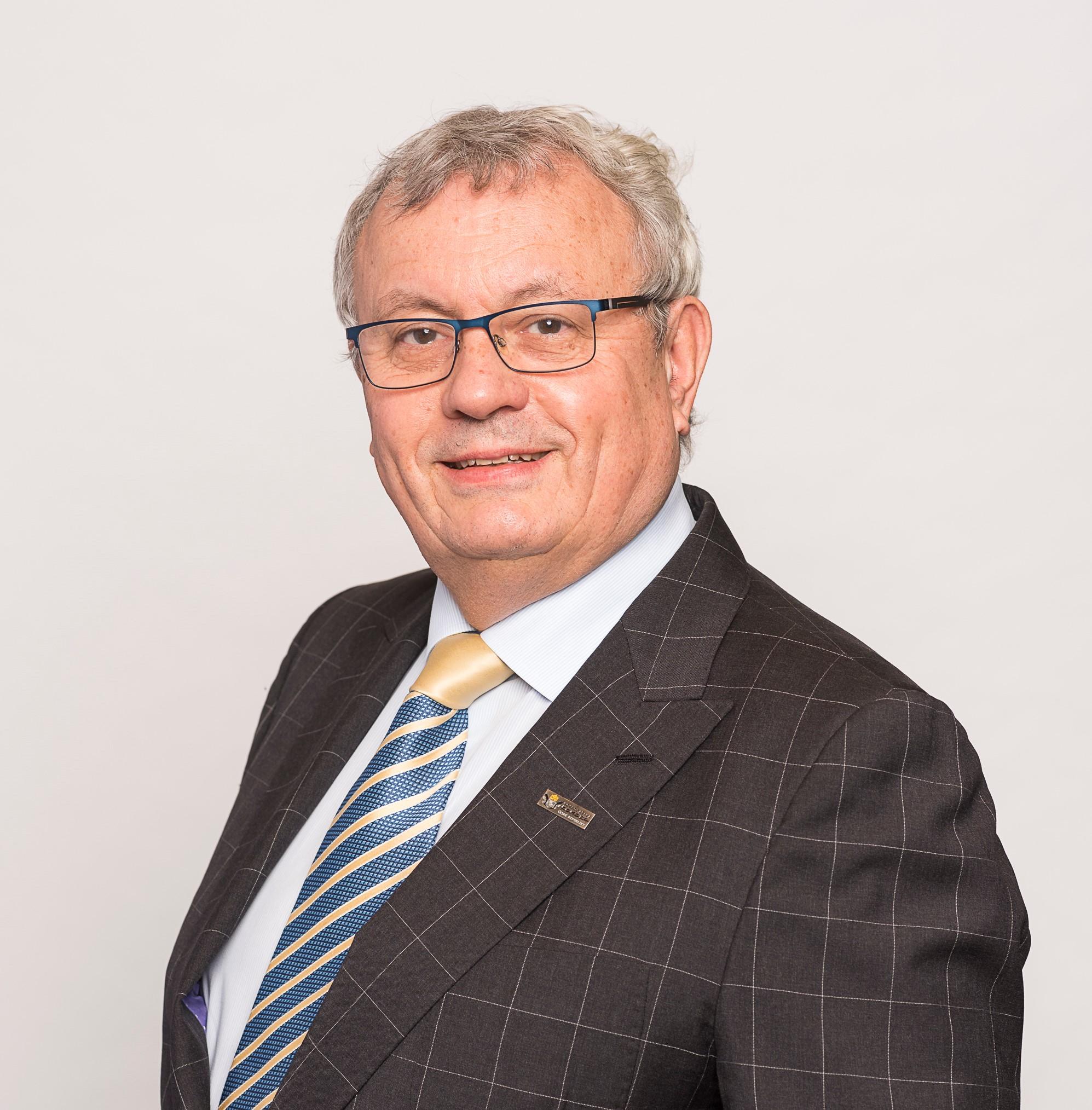
Vladimír Dlouhý, President of Eurochambres since March 2023

President

- Vladimír Dlouhý (Czech Republic) - Eurochambres President

Deputy Presidents

- Aigars Rostovskis (Latvia) - President of Latvian Chamber of Commerce and Industry
- Juho Romakkaniemi (Finland) - CEO of Finland Chamber of Commerce
- Wouter Van Gulck (Belgium) - General Manager of Belgian Chambers

Vice Presidents

- Marta Schultz (Austria) - Vice President of the Austrian Federal Economic Chamber
- Alain Di Crescenzo (France) - President of CCI France
- Sibylle Thierer (Germany) - Vice-President of IHK Nordschwarzwald
- Michl Ebner (Italy) - President of the Chamber of Commerce, Industry, Crafts and Agriculture of Bolzano
- Jerzy Kwieciński (Poland) - Vice-President of the Polish Chamber of Commerce
- José Vicente Morata (Spain) - President of Valencia Chamber of Commerce and Industry
- Rifat Hisarciklioğlu (Türkiye) - President of the Union of Chambers and Commodity Exchanges of Türkiye

== Members ==
FULL MEMBERS

Country	Name of organisation	Status	Date of affiliation
Austria	Austrian Federal Economic Chamber	Full member	22 November 1966
Belgium	Federation of Belgian Chambers of Commerce	Full member	28 February 1958
Bulgaria	Bulgarian Chamber of Commerce and Industry	Full member	3 October 1994
Croatia	Croatian Chamber of Economy	Full member	13 April 2000
Cyprus	Cyprus Chamber of Commerce and Industry	Full member	10 May 1974
Czech Republic	Czech Chamber of Commerce	Full member	3 October 1994
Estonia	Estonian Chamber of Commerce and Industry	Full member	7 October 1993
Finland	Finland Chamber of Commerce	Full member	9 April 1987
France	Chambre de commerce et d'industrie de France - CCI France	Full member	28 February 1958
Germany	Association of German Chambers of Industry and Commerce	Full member	28 February 1958
Greece	Union of Hellenic Chambers of Commerce and Industry	Full member	30 August 1961
Hungary	Hungarian Chamber of Commerce and industry	Full member	20 April 1990
Ireland	Chambers Ireland	Full member	30 August 1961
Italy	Association of Italian Chambers of Commerce, Industry, Craft and Agriculture	Full member	28 February 1958
Latvia	Latvian Chamber of Commerce and Industry	Full member	7 October 1993
Lithuania	Association of Lithuanian Chambers of Commerce, Industry and Crafts	Full member	7 October 1993
Luxembourg	Chamber of Commerce of the Grand-Duchy of Luxembourg	Full member	28 February 1958
Malta	Malta Chamber of Commerce, Enterprise and Industry	Full member	5 October 1989
Poland	Polish Chamber of Commerce	Full member	17 October 1991
Portugal	Portuguese Chamber of Commerce and Industry	Full member	28 November 1980
Romania	Chamber of Commerce and Industry of Romania	Full member	7 October 1993
Slovakia	Slovak Chamber of Commerce and Industry	Full member	7 October 1993
Slovenia	Chamber of Commerce and Industry of Slovenia	Full member	8 December 1992
Spain	Spanish Chamber of Commerce	Full member	1 December 1967
Sweden	Association of Swedish Chambers of Commerce and Industry	Full member	1 December 1967

AFFILIATED MEMBERS

Country	Name of organisation	Status	Date of affiliation
Azerbaijan	Chamber of Commerce and Industry of the Azerbaijan Republic	Affiliated member	20 May 2005
Belarus	Belarusian Chamber of Commerce and Industry	Affiliated member	10 October 2002
Bosnia and Herzegovina	Foreign Trade Chamber of Bosnia and Herzegovina	Affiliated member	19 October 2001
Georgia	Georgian Chamber of Commerce and Industry	Affiliated member	20 October 2004
Kosovo	Kosova Chamber of Commerce	Affiliated member	16 October 2015
Moldova	Chamber of Commerce and Industry of the Republic of Moldova	Affiliated member	10 October 2002
Montenegro	Chamber of Commerce and Industry of Montenegro	Affiliated member	12 October 2006
Norway	Federation of Norwegian Commercial and Service Enterprises	Affiliated member	1 December 1967
Russia	Chamber of Commerce and Industry of the Russian Federation	Affiliated member	23 April 1993
Serbia	Chamber of Commerce and Industry of Serbia	Affiliated member	19 October 2001
Switzerland	Chambers of Commerce and Industry of Switzerland	Affiliated member	10 May 1974
Türkiye	Chambers and Commodity Exchanges of Türkiye	Affiliated member	17 June 1966
Ukraine	Ukrainian Chamber of Commerce and Industry	Affiliated member	10 October 2002

CORRESPONDENT MEMBERS

Country	Name of organisation	Status	Date of affiliation
Andorra	Andorra Chamber of Commerce	Correspondent member	
AIC Forum	Forum of the Adriatic and Ionian Chambers of Commerce	Correspondent member	15 October 2010
INSULEUR	Network of Insular Chambers of Commerce and Industry of the EU	Correspondent member	4 October 2006
Israel	Federation of Israeli Chambers of Commerce	Correspondent member	
