= Vegeta (condiment) =

Seasoning

Vegeta is a Croatian brand of savoury seasonings of dehydrated vegetables, spices, and MSG, produced by Croatian food company Podravka. It is considered a staple of Eastern European cuisine.

The product was originally developed at Podravka's labs in Koprivnica, then part of Yugoslavia, in 1958. Zlata Bartl, a Bosnian Croat chemical technician who created a popular line of dehydrated soup packets, led the team that developed Vegeta. It was first sold in 1959 under the name "Vegeta 40", and first exported in 1967 to Hungary and the Soviet Union. Vegeta has been produced by Podravka in Koprivnica since its introduction, and is also manufactured in Poland, Austria, Hungary, and Tanzania.

Vegeta was a commercial success for Podravka and led to an economic boom in Koprivnica. Bartl, who became known as "Auntie Vegeta" (Croatian: Teta Vegeta), was made an honorary citizen of the city before her death in 2008. Nielsen named Vegeta the best-selling universal food seasoning in Europe in 2021, and the products are sold in 40 countries worldwide.

There is also a "no MSG added" version for those avoiding monosodium glutamate.

== Ingredients ==
The ingredients of Vegeta include (according to the 2008 product packaging):

- salt max. 56%
- dehydrated vegetables 15.5% (carrot, parsnip, onions, celery, parsley leaves)
- flavour enhancers (MSG max. 15%, disodium inosinate)
- sugar
- spices
- cornstarch
- riboflavin (for yellow coloring)

Average contents of 100 g of Vegeta
Energetic value	583 kJ (137 kcal)
Protein	9 g
Carbohydrate	24.5 g
Fat	0.6 g
Sodium	23 g
