= Vugava =

Variety of grape

Vugava (also known as Bugava) is a white grape variety mostly cultivated on the Croatian island of Vis in central Dalmatia.

Vugava is often compared to Viognier due to its aromatic profile, but it has been genetically proven that they have no relationship. It is a very old variety, anecdotally said to be over 2,000 years old and to have been cultivated by the ancient Greek colonists when the island was known as Issa, or introduced by the Roman army, although there is hard no proof of this. There is even a debate on whether Agatharchides was referring to Vugava when he wrote: "On the island of Vis is a wine produced that no other wine equals".

Vugava requires a lot of attention and needs to be harvested at the right time. Although recognized as a high quality grape variety, it is usually used for blending with other varieties such as Chardonnay, Pinot Gris, or Sauvignon Blanc. This is because in its traditional form, Vugava wine has a very high sugar content and overripe aromas. Vugava wines can best be described as having sweet and fruity flavors which may be lacking in terms of acidity levels.

Wines produced from Vugava grapes are best paired with savory foods rich in flavor, such as fish and poultry dishes.
