= Croatian Chamber of Economy =

Coordinates: 45.8144°N 15.9782°E

- Hrvatska Gospodarska Komora
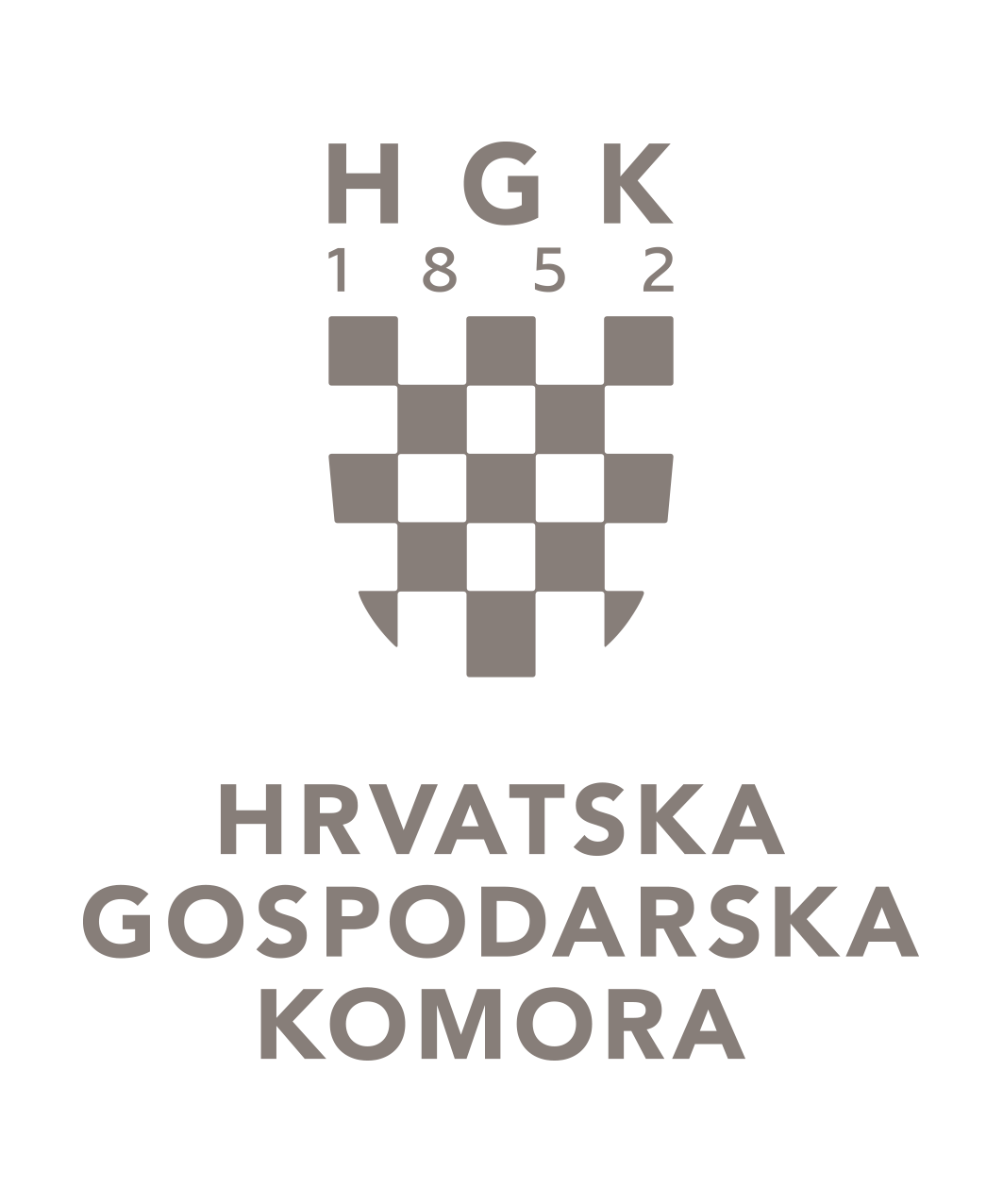

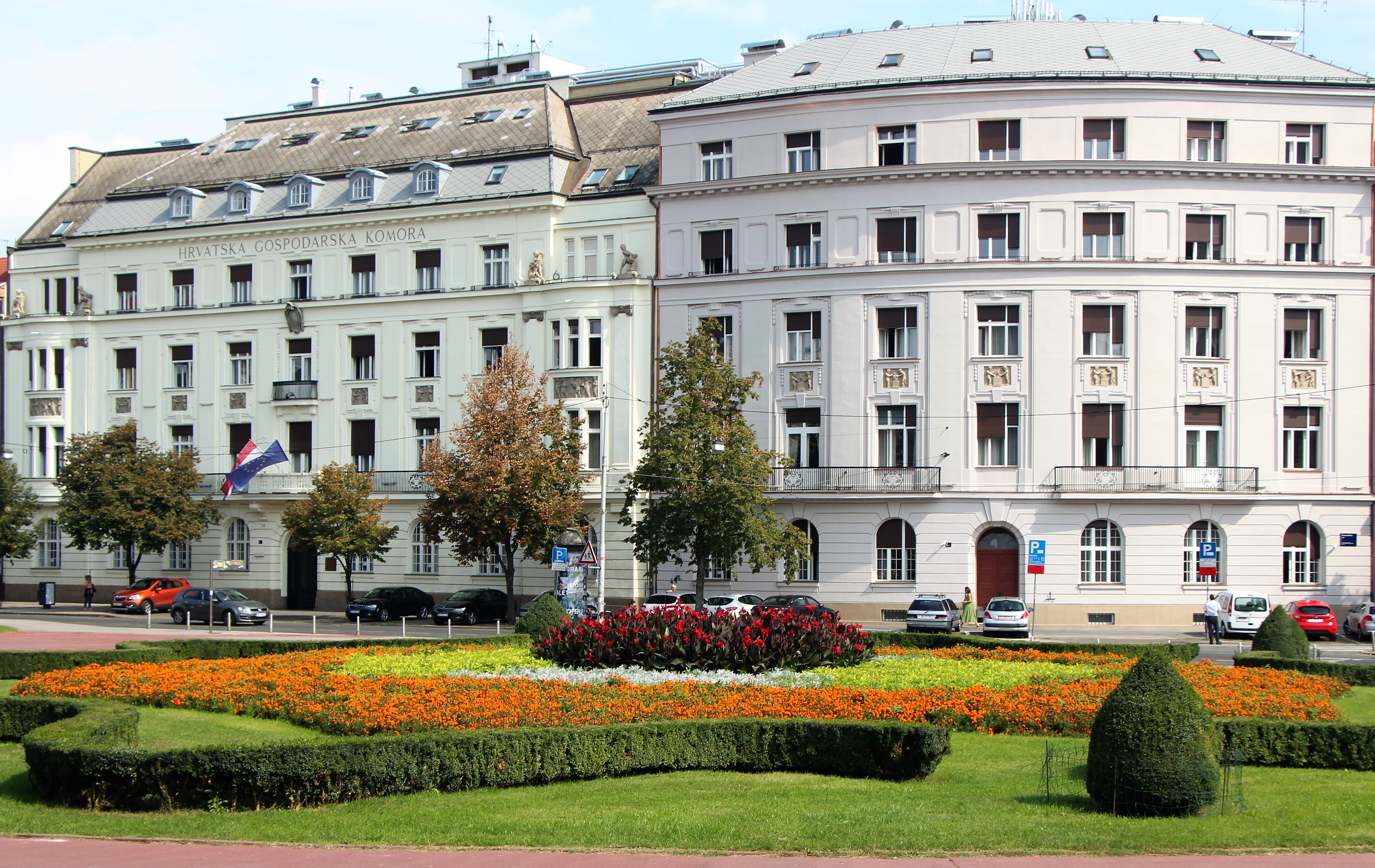
- Formation: 16 February 1852
- Headquarters: Zagreb, Croatia
- Leader: Luka Burilović
- Affiliations: Government of Croatia
- Website: www.hgk.hr

Croatian Chamber of Economy (Croatian: Hrvatska gospodarska komora, abbreviation HGK), is a professional association of businesspeople in Croatia, and the oldest institution of its kind on the Croatian territory.

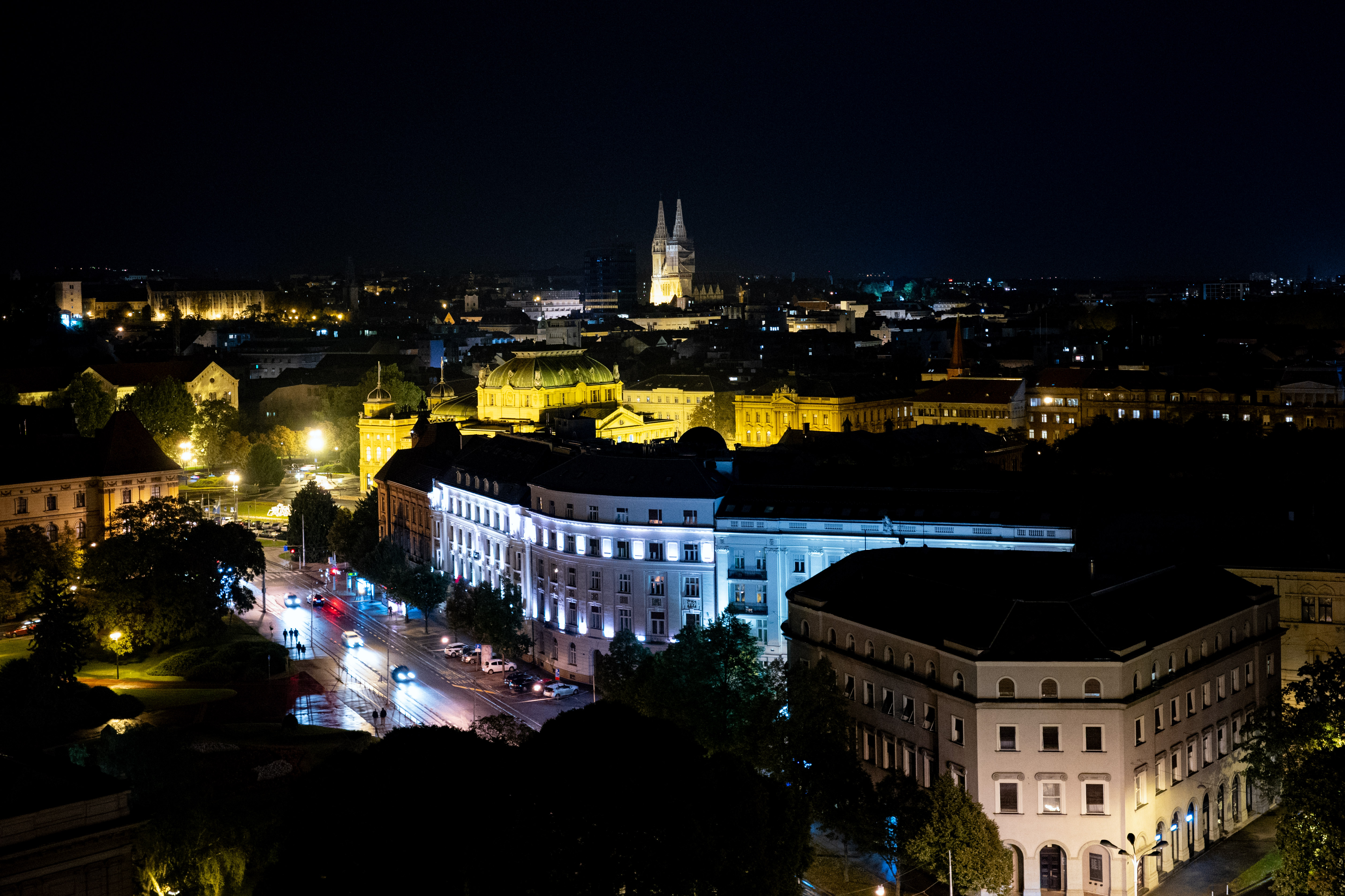
Headquarters of the Croatian Chamber of Economy

== History ==
It originates from the Chamber of Trades (trgovačko-obrtnička komora), which began operating on 16 February 1852 in Zagreb, on the basis of the imperial decree of March 18, 1850. During the 1920s the chamber was significantly modernized, growing into a strong and reputable institution on a European scale. In 1932 it was divided into Trade-Industrial and Handicraft Chamber, and in 1938 the Chamber of Commerce and the Chamber of Industry were created separately. Apart from a few years in the postwar period, those chambers operated as separate branches until 1962, when the unified Croatian Chamber of Economy was founded.

== Chamber today ==
According to the 1991 law the Chamber operates under its current name. It is structured after the European tradition of chamber organization, with compulsory membership and the scope of activities determined by law. The primary tasks of the Chamber are:

- representation, coordination and safeguarding common interests of its members before country institutions
- participation in shaping the economic system and economic policy
- promotion of the Croatian economy abroad
- business training and execution of entrusted public authority

The Chamber today is composed of 19 county chambers, as well as the Chamber Zagreb. Its professional organization is based on the work of 33 professional associations. The Chamber is funded by mandatory fees and other non-profit income. The highest governing body is the Chamber Assembly (Skupština Komore). It is a member of the International Chamber of Commerce and Eurochambres.
