= List of companies of Croatia =

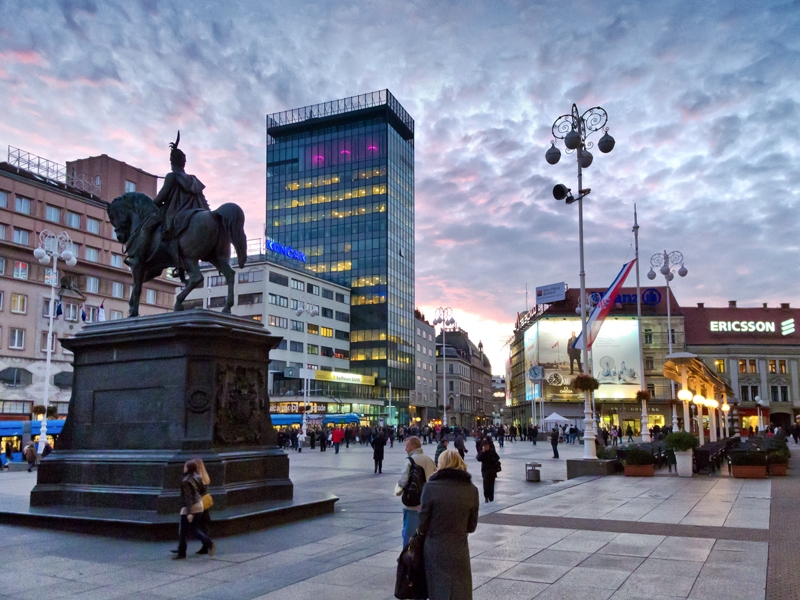
Around 35% of all Croatian companies are headquartered in capital city Zagreb.

This list of companies in Croatia or formed under Croatian law make up the majority of the Croatian economy's private sector. The service sector dominates the economy, followed by the industrial and agricultural sectors. The tourism sector contributes a significant source of revenue to many companies within Croatia. The state controls a part of the economy, with substantial government expenditure. The European Union is the nation's largest trading partner.

Since 2000, the Croatian government has heavily invested in infrastructure, especially transport routes and facilities along European corridors. The legal structures of these companies vary widely, often carrying identifying abbreviations. Approximately 33% of the Croatian population are employed by small companies (nine employees or less) while 29% are employed by large companies (250 employees or more).

== Largest firms ==
This list shows Croatian firms ranked on SEE TOP 100 list by total revenues reported before January 31, 2026.

Rank	Name	Sector	Revenue (€B)	Employees	Notes
1	Fortenova Group	Retail	5.6	38,000	Food product retailer
2	Orbico Group	Services	4.2	10,300	Logistics company
3	INA Group	Energy	3.8	8,800	Oil and gas company
4	HEP Group	Energy	3.1	11,000	Energy conglomerate
5	Konzum	Retail	2.0	10,000	Supermarket chain

== List ==
This list includes notable companies with primary headquarters located in the country. The industry and sector follow the Industry Classification Benchmark taxonomy. Organizations which have ceased operations are included and noted as defunct.

Notable companies Status: P=Private, S=State; A=Active, D=Defunct
Name	Industry	Sector	Headquarters	Founded	Notes	Status	
3. Maj	Industrials	Commercial vehicles & trucks	Rijeka	1892	Shipyard	P	A
3LHD	Industrials	Business support services	Zagreb	1994	Architecture	P	A
A1 Hrvatska	Telecommunications	Mobile telecommunications	Zagreb	1999	Mobile operator and ISP	P	A
LNG Hrvatska	Oil & gas	Exploration & production	Omišalj	2013	Natural gas	P	A
AD Plastik	Consumer goods	Auto parts	Solin	1952	Plastic parts and accessories	P	A
Adriatic Croatia International Club	Consumer services	Travel & tourism	Opatija	1983	Tourism	P	A
Adris Grupa	Consumer goods	Tobacco	Rovinj	2003	Tobacco	P	A
Agrokor	Consumer goods	Food products	Zagreb	1976	Merged into Fortenova Group in 2019	P	D
Aquarius Records	Consumer services	Broadcasting & entertainment	Zagreb	1995	Record label	P	A
Atlantic Grupa	Consumer goods	Food products	Zagreb	1991	Food products	P	A
Atlantska plovidba	Industrials	Marine transportation	Dubrovnik	1955	Shipping company	P	A
Badel 1862	Consumer goods	Distillers & vintners	Zagreb	1862	Alcoholic beverages	P	A
BioGnost	Health care	Pharmaceuticals	Zagreb	1990	Pharmaceuticals and biomedicine	P	A
Blue Line International	Industrials	Marine transportation	Split	2003	Ferry operator	P	A
Bonbon	Telecommunications	Mobile telecommunications	Zagreb	2010	Mobile phones	P	A
Borovo	Consumer goods	Footwear	Vukovar	1931	Shoes, sneakers	P	A
Brodosplit	Industrials	Commercial vehicles & trucks	Split	1922	Shipyard	P	A
Čakovečki mlinovi	Consumer goods	Food products	Čakovec	1893	Milling	P	A
Carlsberg Croatia	Consumer goods	Brewers	Koprivnica	2004	Brewery	P	A
Cedevita	Consumer goods	Soft drinks	Zagreb	1929	Beverage	P	A
Croatia Airlines	Consumer services	Airlines	Zagreb	1989	National airline	S	A
Croatia Film	Consumer services	Broadcasting & entertainment	Zagreb	1946	Film	P	A
Croatia osiguranje	Financials	Full line insurance	Zagreb	1884	Insurance	P	A
Croatia Records	Consumer services	Broadcasting & entertainment	Zagreb	1947	Record label	P	A
Croatian National Bank	Financials	Banks	Zagreb	1990	National bank	S	A
Croatian Radiotelevision	Consumer services	Broadcasting & entertainment	Zagreb	1926	Broadcaster	S	A
Croatian Railways	Industrials	Railroads	Zagreb	1991	National railway	S	A
Croteam	Technology	Software	Zagreb	1993	Software	P	A
Crotram	Industrials	Commercial vehicles & trucks	Zagreb	1994	Low-floor trams	P	A
Dalekovod	Industrials	Electrical components & equipment	Zagreb	1949	Electrical engineering	P	A
Dallas Records	Consumer services	Broadcasting & entertainment	Zagreb	1994	Record label	P	A
Digitron	Industrials	Electronic equipment	Buje	1971	Business electronics	P	A
DOK-ING	Industrials	Industrial engineering	Zagreb	1992	Military vehicles, robots	P	A
Dukat	Consumer goods	Food	Zagreb	1912	Dairy products	P	A
Ðuro Ðaković	Industrials	Industrial engineering	Slavonski Brod	1991	Military vehicles, locomotives, trams, power plant and farm equipment	P	A
Ericsson Nikola Tesla	Telecommunications	Mobile telecommunications	Zagreb	1949	Croatian subsidiary of Ericsson (Sweden)	P	A
European Coastal Airlines	Consumer services	Airlines	Split	2000	Air taxi operator, defunct 2016	P	D
Fine'sa Grupa	Financials	Financial services	Varaždin	2012		P	A
Fortenova Group	Consumer goods	Food products	Zagreb	2019	Food products	P	A
Franck	Consumer goods	Soft drinks	Zagreb	1892	Coffee products and snacks	P	A
Gavrilović	Consumer goods	Food	Petrinja	1821	Salami and sausages	P	A
Geofoto	Technology	Software	Zagreb	1993	Photogrammetry and geographic information systems	P	A
Hanza Media	Consumer services	Publishing	Zagreb	1990	Publishing house	P	A
Hit Records	Consumer services	Broadcasting & entertainment	Zagreb	2003	Record label	P	A
Hönigsberg & Deutsch	Industrials	Business support services	Zagreb	1889	Architecture, defunct 1911	P	D
Hrvatska elektroprivreda	Utilities	Conventional electricity	Zagreb	1895	National electricity production and distribution	S	A
Hrvatska pošta	Industrials	Delivery services	Zagreb	1999	National postal company	S	A
Hrvatska poštanska banka	Financials	Banks	Zagreb	1991	Bank	S	A
Hrvatske autoceste	Industrials	Transportation services	Zagreb	2001	Motorway maintenance	S	A
Hrvatski Telekom	Telecommunications	Fixed line telecommunications	Zagreb	1998	Part of Deutsche Telekom (Germany)	P	A
HS Produkt	Industrials	Defense	Ozalj	1991	Firearms manufacturer	P	A
IN2	Technology	Software	Zagreb	1992	Software	P	A
INA	Oil & gas	Exploration & production	Zagreb	1964	Oil & gas, owned by MOL Group	P	A
Infobip	Technology	Software	Vodnjan	2006	Software	P	A
INGRA	Industrials	Heavy construction	Zagreb	1955	Construction	P	A
Institut IGH	Industrials	Heavy construction	Zagreb	1949	Construction	P	A
Iskon Internet	Technology	Internet	Zagreb	1997	Internet service provider	P	A
Jadran Film	Consumer services	Broadcasting & entertainment	Zagreb	1946	Film production studio	P	A
Jadranski naftovod	Oil & gas	Pipelines	Zagreb	1974	Adriatic pipeline, crude oil transportation	P	A
Jadrolinija	Industrials	Marine transportation	Rijeka	1947	National sea transport	S	A
Jamnica	Consumer goods	Soft drinks	Zagreb	1828	Non-alcoholic beverages, part of Fortenova Group	P	A
Jugoton	Consumer services	Broadcasting & entertainment	Zagreb	1947	Record label, defunct 1990	P	D
Karlovačka pivovara	Consumer goods	Brewers	Karlovac	1854	Brewery	P	A
Kandit	Consumer goods	Food products	Osijek	1920	Confectionery	P	A
Koestlin	Consumer goods	Food products	Bjelovar	1905	Confectionery	P	A
KONČAR Group	Industrials	Electronic equipment	Zagreb	1921	Industrial electronic appliances	P	A
Konstruktor-Split	Industrials	Heavy construction	Split	1945	Construction company	P	A
Konzum	Consumer services	Food retailers & wholesalers	Zagreb	1957	Supermarket chain	P	A
Kraljevica Shipyard	Industrials	Commercial vehicles & trucks	Kraljevica	1729	Shipyard	P	A
Kraš	Consumer goods	Food products	Zagreb	1950	Confectionery products	P	A
Ledo	Consumer goods	Food products	Zagreb	1958	Subsidiary of Fortenova Group, frozen foods and various desserts	P	A
Luka Ploče	Industrials	Transportation services	Ploče	1952	Managing company of the Ploče seaport	P	A
Matica hrvatska	Consumer services	Publishing	Zagreb	1842	Publisher	P	A
Menart Records	Consumer services	Broadcasting & entertainment	Zagreb	1994	Record label	P	A
Narodni trgovački lanac	Consumer services	Broadline retailers	Zagreb	2008	Retail chain	P	A
Odašiljači i veze	Technology	Internet	Zagreb	2001	Digital television and WiMAX operator	P	A
Orbico Group	Consumer services	Distribution	Zagreb	1989	Logistics and distribution company	P	A
Petrokemija	Basic materials	Commodity chemicals	Kutina	1968	Fertilizer manufacturer	P	A
Pivovara Ličanka	Consumer goods	Brewers	Gospić	1997	Brewery	P	A
Plinacro	Utilities	Gas distribution	Zagreb	2001	Natural gas transmission	P	A
Pliva	Health care	Pharmaceuticals	Zagreb	1921	Pharmaceuticals	P	A
Plovput	Industrials	Transportation services	Split	1992	Waterway infrastructure	P	A
Podravka	Consumer goods	Food products	Koprivnica	1934	Food products	P	A
Primorska banka	Financials	Banks	Rijeka	2001	Bank, defunct 2018	P	D
Privredna banka Zagreb	Financials	Banks	Zagreb	1966	Bank, part of Intesa Sanpaolo (Italy)	P	A
Rimac Automobili	Consumer goods	Automobiles	Sveta Nedelja	2009	Electric vehicles	P	A
RIZ	Industrials	Electronic equipment	Zagreb	1948	Transmitters, electricity meters, formerly electrical components	P	A
Saponia	Consumer goods	Chemicals	Osijek	1894	Cleaning and hygiene products	P	A
Školska knjiga	Consumer services	Publishing	Zagreb	1950	Publishing house	P	A
Sljeme	Consumer goods	Durable household products	Zagreb	1921	Trunks manufacturing	P	A
Splitska banka	Financials	Banks	Split	1965	Bank	P	A
Suzy	Consumer services	Broadcasting & entertainment	Zagreb	1972	Record label	P	A
Tehnika	Industrials	Business support services	Zagreb	1947	Civil engineering	P	A
Tomato	Telecommunications	Mobile telecommunications	Zagreb	2006	Mobile phone operator	P	A
TOZ Penkala	Consumer goods	Nondurable household products	Zagreb	1937	School accessories	P	A
Trade Air	Consumer services	Airlines	Zagreb	1994	Airline	P	A
TŽV Gredelj	Industrials	Commercial vehicles & trucks	Zagreb	1894	Rolling stock production	P	A
Uljanik	Industrials	Commercial vehicles & trucks	Pula	1856	Shipbuilding company	P	A
V.B.Z.	Consumer services	Publishing	Zagreb	1991	Publisher	P	A
Viadukt	Industrials	Transportation services	Zagreb	1947	Civil engineering (tunnels, roads, viaducts and bridges)	P	A
Viktor Lenac Shipyard	Industrials	Commercial vehicles & trucks	Rijeka	1896	Shipyard	P	A
Vindija	Consumer goods	Food products	Varaždin	1959	Dairy	P	A
Viro	Consumer goods	Food products	Virovitica	2002	Sugar refinery	P	A
Zagreb Film	Consumer services	Broadcasting & entertainment	Zagreb	1953	Film production company	P	A
Zagreb Stock Exchange	Financials	Financial services	Zagreb	1991	Primary exchange	P	A
Zagrebačka banka	Financials	Banks	Zagreb	1914	Bank	P	A
Zagrebačka pivovara	Consumer goods	Brewers	Zagreb	1892	Brewery	P	A
Zagrebački električni tramvaj	Industrials	Transportation services	Zagreb	1891	Public transport system operator	S	A
Zvečevo	Consumer goods	Food products	Požega	1921	Confectionery	P	A
