= Sky Office Tower =

Office building in Zagreb, Croatia

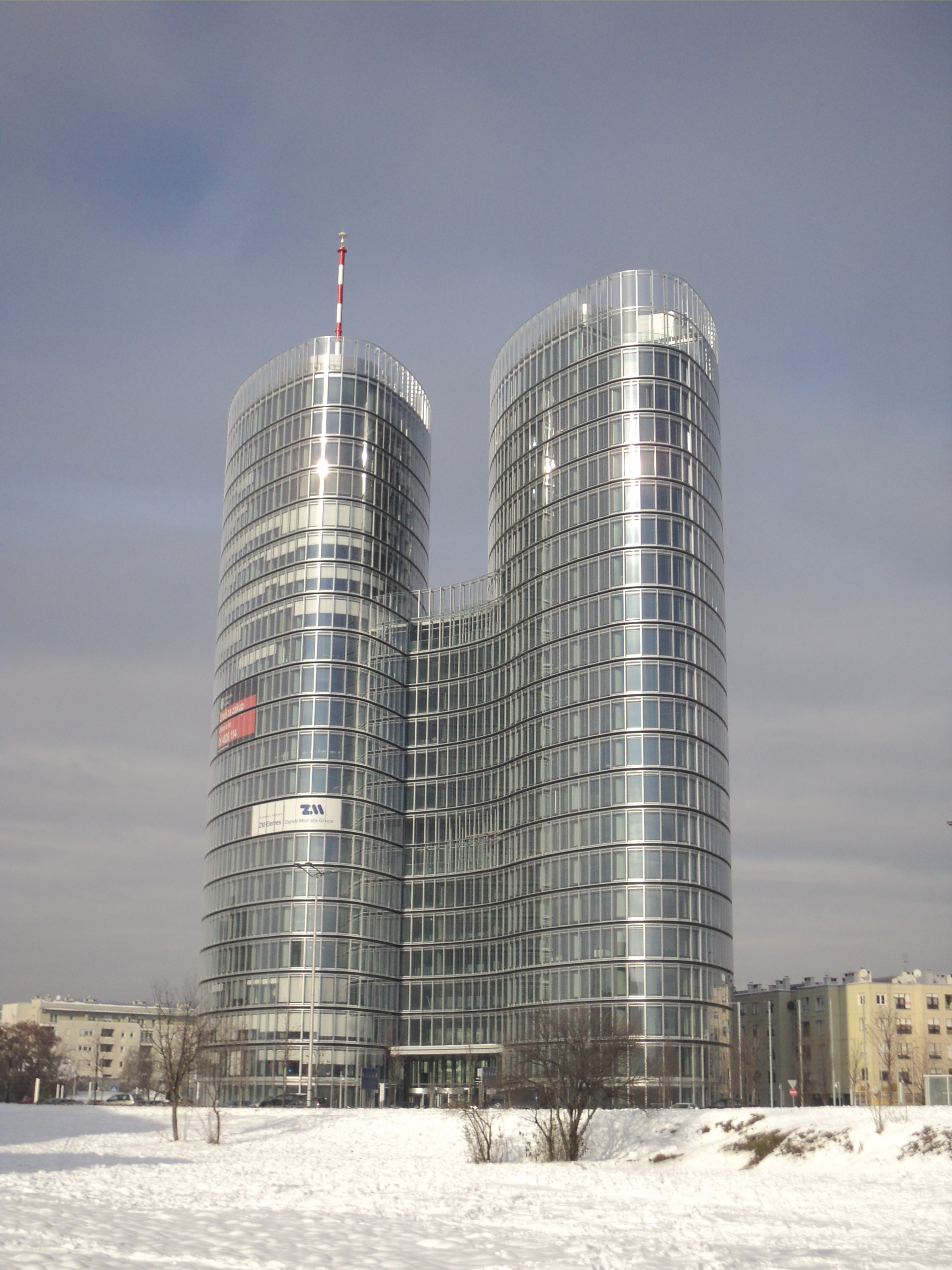
- Sky Office Tower
- Interactive map of the Sky Office Tower area

General information
- Status: Completed
- Type: Business
- Location: Zagreb, Croatia
- Coordinates: 45°47′48″N 15°54′42″E
- Construction started: 21 August 2007
- Estimated completion: late summer 2012
- Cost: €86 million (2010 est.)
- Owner: Dalekovod, Zagreb-Montaža

Height
- Roof: 80 m (260 ft)
- Top floor: 22

Technical details
- Floor count: 22
- Floor area: 73,010 square metres (785,900 sq ft)
- Lifts/elevators: 6

Design and construction
- Architect: Ante Anin
- Architecture firm: Anin-Jeromin-Fitilidis & Partner
- Main contractor: Tehnika d.d.

Website
- www.skyoffice.hr/hrv/

References
- Sky Office - Arhitektura

Sky Office Tower is a dual business tower, elliptically shaped, located in Zagreb, Croatia, north of the Zagrebačka Avenue, near the intersection with Zagrebačka cesta. The office tower was completed in 2012. It is one of the few high-rise construction projects in Zagreb that persisted throughout the economic crisis in 2010.

The tower has 22 floors above ground and four underground floors. In 2007, the whole project was estimated to cost 76 million euros.

The tower was originally planned to have a total of 26 floors, three of them underground. After the construction started, a change of plan to 29 above-ground floors was announced. This would have made the tower 108 meters high, matching Zagreb Cathedral, the tallest building in the city. The construction was halted for 6 months in 2009 due to funding problems caused by the 2008 financial crisis. Eventually, the number of floors above ground was reduced to 22.

It has a total of 706 parking spaces – 659 in the garage and 47 in the outdoor space. Access to the underground garages is provided via two entry-exit ramps, which are heated against freezing. Underground levels with parking and storage areas are directly linked to the office spaces.

== See also ==
- List of tallest buildings in Croatia

== Bibliography ==
- Nadilo, Branko (2010). "Neobična i atraktivna građevina na zapadnom ulazu u Zagreb" [Breathtaking building at the west entrance to Zagreb] (PDF). Građevinar (in Croatian). 62 (11): 1013–1020.
