= CROBEX =

Croatian stock market index

- Foundation: 1 September 1997
- Operator: Zagreb Stock Exchange
- Exchanges: Zagreb Stock Exchange
- Constituents: 22
- Type: Large cap
- Related indices: CROBEX10, CROBIS
- Website: www.zse.hr/crobex

CROBEX is the official share index of the Zagreb Stock Exchange. As of March 2023, it includes stocks of 15 companies and is calculated continuously using the latest stock prices. It is measured using free float market capitalization, where the weight of each individual stock is limited to 10 percent.

== History ==
It began to be published on 1 September 1997, and the base date is 1 July 1997, when its base value was 1,000 points.

For a long time, the Pliva stock was one of the main constituents of the index, before the company was sold and de-listed.

In October 2007, its value was around 5,400 points, an all-time high. By March 2009, the index dropped to 1,300 points. In the first half of 2011, it hovered around 2,200 points, falling to below 1,800 by the end of the year. In October 2016, the index broke 2,000 points, the highest level since March 2013.

In April 2018, an exchange traded fund started tracking the index - Expat Croatia CROBEX UCITS ETF - listed in Frankfurt on Xetra (ticker ECDC, ISIN BGCROEX03189) and traded in euro, providing a convenient way for exposure to international investors.

== Inclusion criteria ==
Stocks have to be traded in more than 75% of the total number of trade days in the selected time period in order to be included into CROBEX. The stock ranking is determined by weighing the stock's free float market capitalization as a proportion of the total, and its traffic as a proportion of the total share traffic in the six-month time period observed.

The index is revised every third Friday of March and September. The Index Commission can revise the index if the following extraordinary events happen:

- bankruptcy or liquidation of a company, increase or decrease in the base capital of a company, takeover, merger.
- removal of a stock listing
- long-term suspension of trade of a stock

There are also other circumstances related to the issuer or the stock that can affect the quality of the CROBEX index that can cause the commission to revise the index.

A special revision can happen to include a new stock in the index in case the stock, in the first 30 days since its listing date, is traded in 100% of the total number of trade days, taking into account its free float market capitalization and share of traffic.

== Composition ==
The index consists of the following 22 companies, as of the last revision on March 13, 2026

Ticker	Company	Headquarters	NACE
ADPL	AD Plastik	Solin	Production of other parts and accessories for motor vehicles
ADRS2	Adris Group	Rovinj	Management activities
ATGR	Atlantic Group	Zagreb	Non-specialized wholesale trade
ARNT	Arena Hospitality Group	Pula	Hotels and similar accommodation (Note: Arena Hospitality Group (ARNT) removed 1Q 2020,, added 3Q 2020, removed 1Q 2026, and added 3Q 2026.)
BSQR	BOSQAR	Zagreb	Activities of head offices (Note: BOSQAR (BSQR) added September 2026.)
DLKV	Dalekovod	Zagreb	Construction of utility projects for electricity and telecommunications (Note: Dalekovod (DLKV) removed September 2022 and added March 2024.)
ERNT	Ericsson Nikola Tesla	Zagreb	Production of communication equipment
HPB	HPB	Zagreb	Financial and Insurance Activities (Note: Hrvatska poštanska banka (HPB) added March 2020, removed September 2020, added March 2023.)
HT	HT	Zagreb	Activities of wired telecommunications
IG	Ing-Grad	Zagreb	Construction of residential and non-residential buildings
INGR	Ingra	Zagreb	Engineering and related technical consulting (Note: Ingra (INGR) remoevd September 2014, added March 2019, removed September 2020. added March 2023, removed September 2023 and added April 2025.)
JDPL	Jadroplov	Split	Maritime and coastal transport of goods (Note: Jadroplov (JDPL) added September 2014, removed March 2015, removed March 2018, added March 2022, removed March 2024 and added March 2026.)
KODT	Končar - Distributivni i specijalni transformatori	Zagreb	Production of electric motors, generators and transformers
KOEI	Končar	Zagreb	Production of electric motors, generators and transformers
LKRI	Luka Rijeka	Rijeka	Cargo handling (Note: Luka Rijeka (LKRI) removed March 2015, added September 2015,removed March 2017, added March 2018, removed September 2018, added March 2026.)
PODR	Podravka	Koprivnica	Other processing and preservation of fruits and vegetables
RIVP	Valamar Riviera	Poreč	Hotels and similar accommodation
SPAN	Span	Zagreb	Computer programming
TOK	TOKIĆ	Sesvete	Non-specialized wholesale trade (Note: TOK - met criteria for the fast index entry in March 2026.)
VLEN	Viktor Lenac Shipyard	Rijeka	Construction of ships and floating structures
ULPL	Alpha Adriatic (former ULJANIK PLOVIDBA)	Pula	Removed March 2015, added September 2016, removed September 2018, added and removed March 2019,, removed September 2024 and added September 2026}}
ZABA	Zagrebačka banka	Zagreb	Other monetary intermediation
ZITO	ŽITO	Osijek	Mixed farming

== Former components ==
The following stock shares were previously included in the index:

Ticker	Company	Headquarters	NACE	Comments
ATPL	Atlantska plovidba	Dubrovnik	Maritime and coastal transport of goods	
AUHR	AUTO HRVATSKA	Zagreb	Sale of cars and light motor vehicles	Added March 2020 and removed September 2020.
BLJE	BELJE d.d. Dard	Darda	Growing of cereals (except rice), leguminous crops and oil seeds	Removed May 8, 2017
CKML	Čakovečki mlinovi	Čakovec	Production of mill products	Added September 2023, removed March 25, 2025
DDJH	ĐURO ĐAKOVIĆ GRUPA	Slavonski Brod	Activities of head offices	Removed September 21, 2021, added March 9, 2022 and removed July 14, 2022, added September 2025 and removed March 2026
HEFA	Helios Faros	Stari Grad	Hotels and similar accommodation	Added March 2026, removed September 2026
HIMR	Imperial Riviera	Rab	Hotels and similar accommodation	Added March 2015, removed September 2015 and added September 2016 and removed March 2017
HMST	Hoteli Maestral	Dubrovnik	Hotels and similar accommodation	Added March 2015 and removed September 2015
HUPZ	HUP - Zagreb	Zagreb	Hotels and similar accommodation	Added March 2014, Adjusted number of shares March 24, 2014 Removed September 2014, added March 2015 and removed September 2015
IGH	INSTITUT IGH	Zagreb	Other research and experimental development on natural sciences and engineering	Added September 2017, removed September 2018, added March 2020 and removed March 2022
IKBA	Istarska kreditna banka Umag	Umag	Other monetary intermediation	Removed September 2025
INA	Ina	Zagreb	Manufacture of refined petroleum products	Removed September 2016
JDRN	JADRAN	Crikvenica	Hotels and similar accommodation	Added September 2018, removed September 2019.
KODT2	Končar-DIST	Zagreb	Production of electric motors, generators and transformers	Added September 2023 and removed March 2024
KRAS	KRAŠ	Zagreb	Manufacture of cocoa, chocolate and sugar confectionery	Removed March 2019, added March 2020 and removed March 2022
KTJV	Kutjevo	Kutjevo	Cultivation of cereals (except rice), legumes and oilseeds	Added March 2023 and removed September 2023
LEDO	Ledo	Zagreb	Manufacture of ice cream	Removed September 2015 and added March 2016, Removed May 8, 2017
LKPC	Luka Ploče	Ploče	Cargo handling	Added March 2014, Removed September 2014, added March 2015, removed March 2016, added September 2016 and removed March 2018, added March 2022 and removed September 2022
LRH	Liburnia Riviera Hoteli	Opatija	Hotels and similar accommodation	Added March 2015 and removed September 2015
LRHC	FTB TURIZAM	Zagreb	Hotels and similar accommodation	Added September 2022 and removed March 2023
MAIS	Maistra	Rovinj	Hotels and similar accommodation	Added March 2015, removed September 2016, added March 2017, removed September 2017, added March 2018, removed September 2020, added March 2024, removed September 2024, added March 2026, removed September 2026
MONP	Mon Perin	Bale	Holiday and other short-stay accommodation	Added September 2024, removed March 2025
OPTE	OT-OPTIMA TELEKOM	Zagreb	Wired telecommunications activities	Added September 2015 and shares delisted in April 2022
PBZ	Privredna banka Zagreb	Zagreb	Other monetary intermediation	Added March 2020 and removed September 2020.
PLAG	Plava Laguna	Poreč	Hotels and similar accommodation	Added March 2015, removed September 2015, added March 2022, removed March 2023, added Sept 2023, removed March 2026
PTKM	PETROKEMIJA	Kutina	Manufacture of fertilisers and nitrogen compounds	Removed March 2015, added September 2015, removed March 2016, added March 2017, removed September 2017, added September 2021 and removed after delisting on March 7, 2022
RIZO	RIZ-odašiljači	Zagreb	Manufacture of communication equipment	Added September 2014, removed March 2015, added September 2015 and removed March 2016
SAPN	Saponia	Osijek	Manufacture of soap and detergents, cleaning and polishing preparations	Added March 2020, removed March 2021, added September 2021 and removed September 2022
SUNH	Sunčani Hvar	Hvar	Hotels and similar accommodation	Added September 2016 and removed November 18, 2016
THNK	Tehnika	Zagreb	Construction of residential and non-residential buildings	Added September 2014, and removed March 2015
TPNG	Tankerska Next Generation	Zadar	Sea and coastal freight water transport	Added September 2015, Free float changed October 2015, Removed March 2017, added March 2020, removed in March 2021, added September 2021 and removed December 2022 after takeover by Tankerska plovidba d.d
TUHO	Turisthotel	Zadar	Hotels and similar accommodation	Added March 2015 and removed September 2015
VART	Varteks	Varaždin	Manufacture of other outerwear	Added September 2014, and removed March 2015, added March 2016 and removed March 2017
VDKT	Viadukt	Zagreb	Construction of roads and motorways	Removed March 2015, added March 2017, removed from index June 9, 2017, delisted November 2017
VERN	Genera	Rakov Potok	Manufacture of pharmaceutical preparations	Added September 2015 and free float changed October 2015 and delisted January 16, 2016
VIRO	Viro Tvornica Šećera	Zagreb	Manufacture of sugar	Added March 2014, removed September 2014, added March 2020 and removed September 2020.
VPIK	Vupik	Vukovar	Growing of cereals (except rice), leguminous crops and oil seeds	Removed March 2015, added March 2017, removed March 2018
ZB	Zagrebačka burza	Zagreb	Administration of financial markets	Added March 2017

== See also ==
- CROBIS
- Zagreb Stock Exchange
