= VSE =

VSE may refer to:

== Education ==
- University of Economics, Prague (Czech: Vysoká škola ekonomická v Praze), in Czechia
- Vancouver School of Economics, at the University of British Columbia

== Science and technology ==
- VSE (operating system)
- Odakyu 50000 series VSE, a Japanese electric multiple unit
- Vision for Space Exploration, a space policy of the United States
- Visual Smalltalk Enterprise, a Smalltalk dialect

== Stock exchanges ==
- Vadodara Stock Exchange, India
- Vancouver Stock Exchange, Canada
- Varaždin Stock Exchange, Croatia
- Vilnius Stock Exchange, Lithuania

== Other uses ==
- Viseu Airport, in Portugal
- VSE Corporation, an American business services company
