= Alpha Adriatic =

Croatian shipping company

Alpha Adriatic d.d.
- Company type: Public company
- Traded as: ZSE: ULPL
- ISIN: HRULPLRA0002
- Industry: Maritime transport
- Founded: 1 September 1986
- Headquarters: Pula, Croatia
- Area served: Worldwide
- Key people: Igor Budisavljević (director)
- Services: Ship management
- Revenue: ▲263,465,006 HRK (2021)
- Net income: ▲179,773,755 HRK (2021)
- Parent: Uljanik Group
- Subsidiaries: United Shipping Services One Inc. Real d.o.o. ASP Adriatic d.o.o.
- Website: www.uljaniksm.com

Alpha Adriatic d.d. is a Croatian ship management company. Founded and based in Pula, the company owns and operates four bulk carriers and four tankers, five of which are owned by their own subsidiary companies, while 3 ships are entrusted to the company for management by domestic and foreign third parties. The company also provides ship management services to fleets owned by other shipping companies.

Alpha Adriatic is a joint-stock company that was founded in 1986 as part of the Uljanik group under the name Uljanik Plovidba, but in 1994 the privatization process began, during which all ownership links between the two companies were severed over the course of four years. However, despite this, there remained confusion about the company's identity, as well as a false impression of the connection with the Uljanik Group, which recently, due to the financial difficulties of the Uljanik Shipyard, made business difficult for the company's management. Therefore, the decision was made to change the name to Alpha Adriatica.

== Management ==
The company is managed by director Igor Budisavljević, and supervision is carried out by the procurator, supervisory and audit committee.

It is part of the Uljanik Group, which also includes Uljanik Shipyard. Alpha Adriatic has three subsidiaries:

- United Shipping Services One Inc. - maritime transportation
- Real d.o.o. - construction and agriculture
- ASP Adriatic d.o.o. - consulting

The company's shares are listed on the Zagreb Stock Exchange (ZSE) and is one of the 22 companies included in its official share index CROBEX as of August 2022. In 2022 the company posted a total revenue of HRK 263.5 million (US$34.2 million) and a net income of HRK 179.8 million (US$23.3 million), 88 percent up from 2020.

== Fleet ==
Alpha Adriatic d.d. manages a fleet of 4 bulk carriers and 4 tankers. All ships were built in Croatian shipyards. Ships for the transport of bulk cargo in the Uljanik shipyard in Pula, and tankers in the 3. Maj shipyard in Rijeka. The average age of the ships in the fleet is 11 years, and 6 ships have Pula as their home port and fly the Croatian flag.

Ship	Built	Type	GT	LOA(m)	Beam(m)	Draught(m)	Flag	Ref
MV Veruda	2011	bulk carrier	30,092	189.90	32.24	12.35	Croatia	
MV Stoja	2012	bulk carrier	30,092	189.90	32.24	12.35	Bahamas	
MV Punta	2013	bulk carrier	30,092	189.90	32.24	12.35	Croatia	
MV Valovine	2016	bulk carrier	30,092	189.90	32.24	12.35	Croatia	
MT Verige	2010	tanker	30,638	195.11	32.20	12.52	Croatia	
MT Pomer	2011	tanker	30,638	195.11	32.20	12.52	Croatia	
MT Champion Istra	2012	tanker	30,638	195.03	32.20	12.52	Croatia	
MT Champion Pula	2006	tanker	27,547	182.50	32.20	12.26	Norway	

== See also ==
- Uljanik
