= Međimurje (disambiguation) =

Međimurje may refer to:

- Međimurje (region), a small historical and geographical region in the northernmost part of Croatia
- Međimurje County, a triangle-shaped county in Northern Croatia
- NK Međimurje, a Croatian football club based in Čakovec
- Međimurje horse, an autochthonous medium-heavy horse breed of draught horse originating from Međimurje
- GK Međimurje, former large construction and civil engineering company based in Čakovec
