= Plava Laguna =

Croatian tourist group

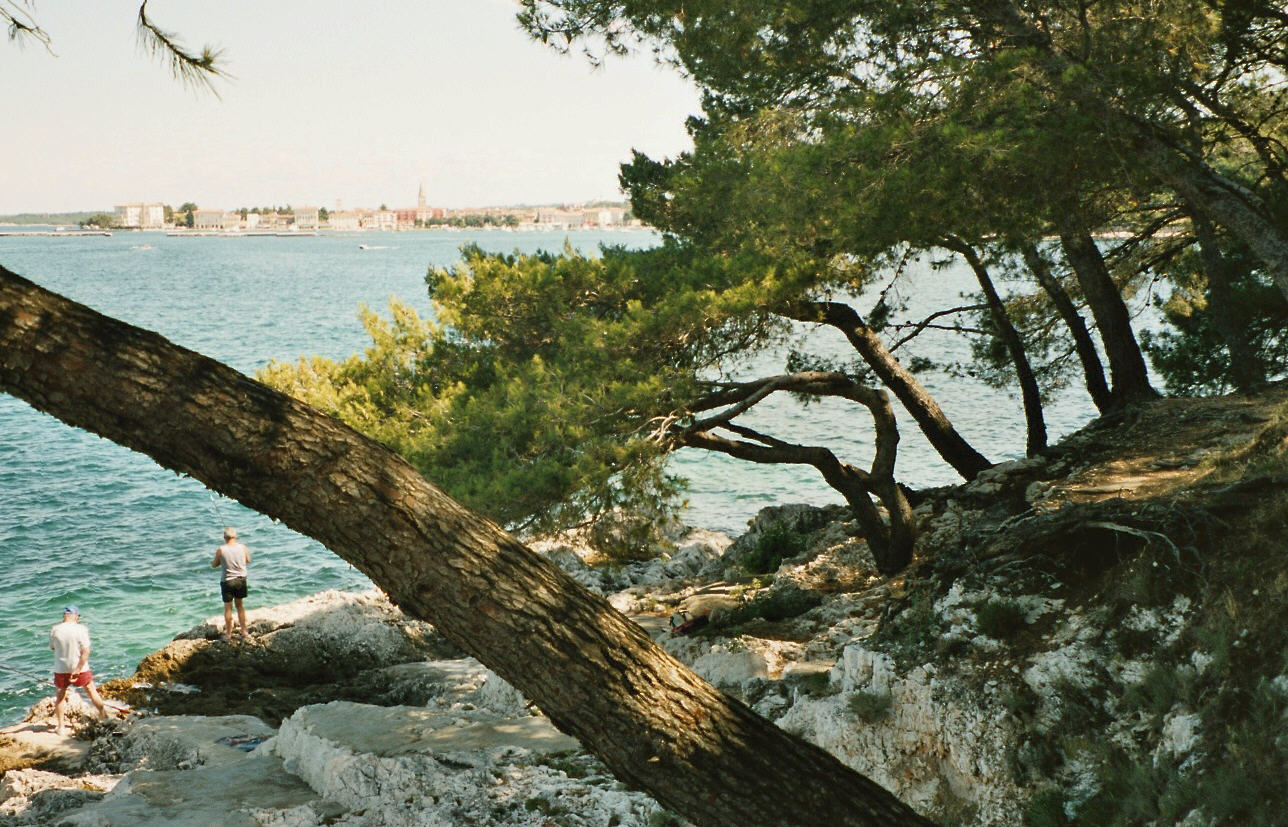
Plava Laguna beach near Poreč, Croatia

Plava Laguna ("Blue Lagoon" in Croatian) is a tourist group based in Poreč in Istria, Croatia. It is listed on the CROBEX index of the Zagreb Stock Exchange.
