= Ante Anin =

German architect originally from Croatia

- Born: 3 February 1966 (age 60); Zagreb, Croatia
- Occupation: Architect
- Buildings: Sky Office Tower
- Projects: East Side Tower

Ante Anin (born 3 February 1966) is a German architect originally from Croatia. He is perhaps best known for designing the Sky Office Tower and East Side Tower in Zagreb.

From 1986 to 1990, Anin studied architecture in Wuppertal. From 1990 to 1994 he worked in various architectural offices, in 1994 he worked for Stefan Jeromin in Düsseldorf. Since 1998 Anin has been working for Stefan Jeromin and Dimitrios Fitilidis.
