= Međimurska trikotaža Čakovec =

Knitwear factory in Croatia, 1923–2016

Međimurska trikotaža Čakovec d.d.
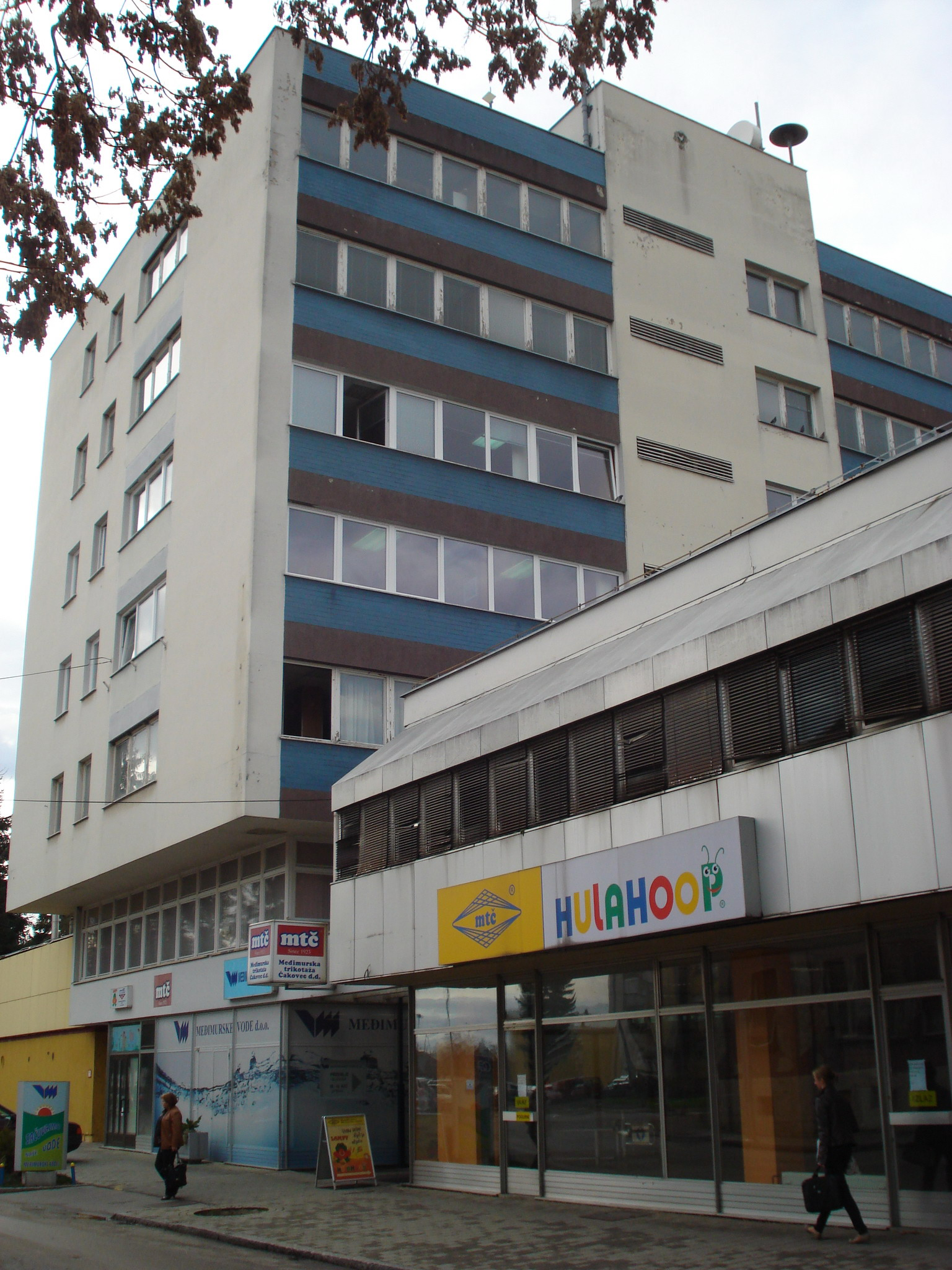
- Type: Public company
- Industry: Knitwear products
- Founded: 1923
- Defunct: 2016
- Fate: Bankruptcy
- Headquarters: Čakovec, Croatia
- Products: underwear, outerwear, infant clothing, hosiery, haberdashery etc.
- Net income: total revenue: HRK 103,360,278.00 (2001)
- Total assets: HRK 139,037,143.00 (2001)
- Number of employees: ~3,500 (1980s)

Međimurska trikotaža Čakovec (English: "Međimurje Knitwear Factory, Čakovec") was a Croatian knitwear factory based in Čakovec, Međimurje County. Also known by the abbreviation MTČ, the company was one of the largest textile producers in the country, dealing with the production and sales of knitted products.

Founded in 1923 in Čakovec as a joint-stock company (Croatian: "d.d.") of the Graner brothers, entrepreneurs of Jewish origin, which produced ribbons and socks at the very beginning, MTČ was nationalized after the Second World War (1945/46) and constantly increased production as well as the number of employees over the next few decades. In 1995, due to binding privatization laws, the factory was harmonized with the valid Companies Act, and in 1996 restructured and divided into several affiliated companies. Getting into business difficulties, most of these companies, including the parent company, ceased to exist by 2016.

== Basic data ==
MTČ was an industrial giant, the second largest company in Međimurje by the number of employees, of whom there were around 3500 at the time of the boom in the 1980s. At the same time, the largest company in region was GK "Međimurje" Čakovec, a construction company with over 8000 employees.

== History ==
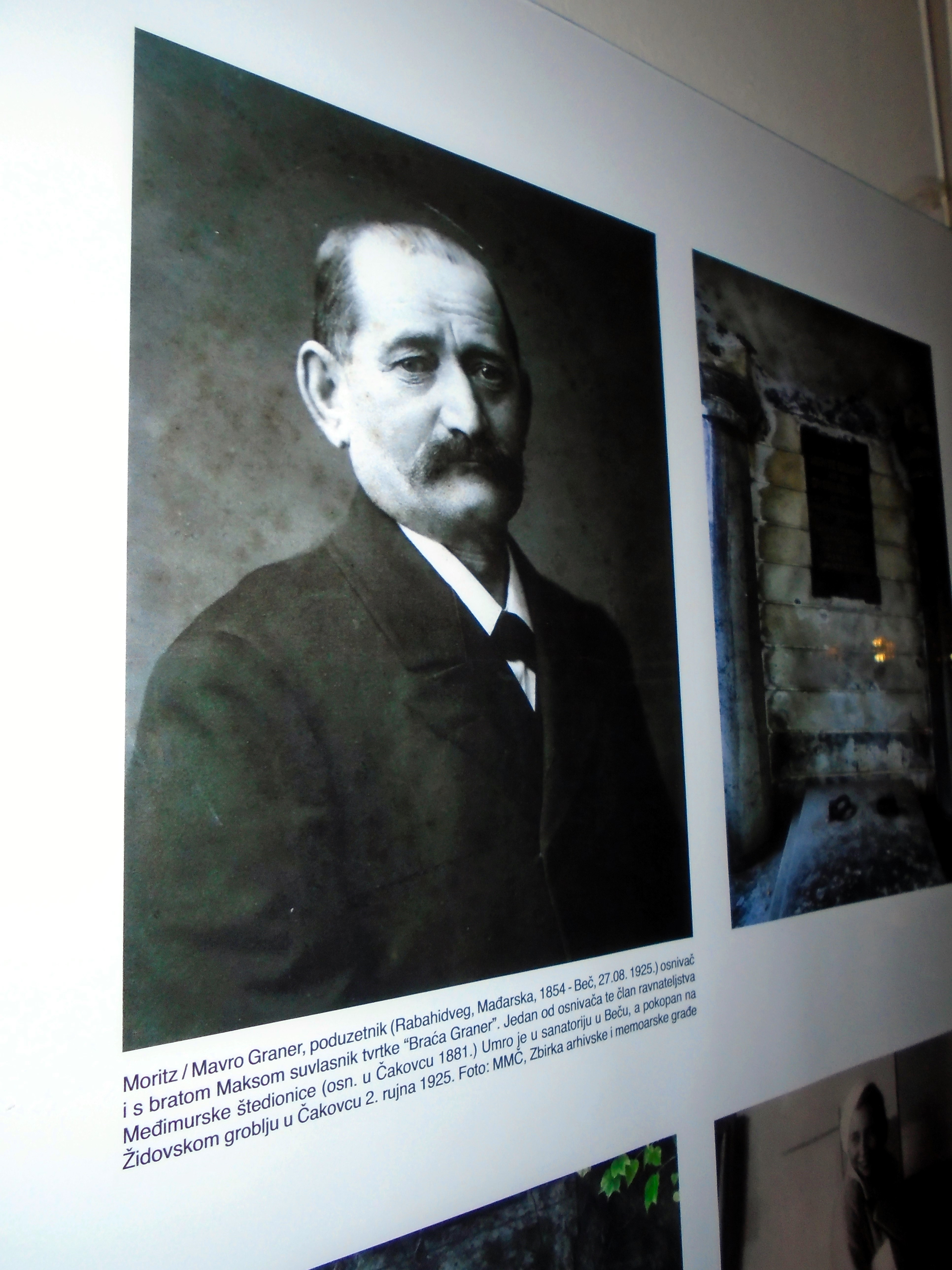
Moritz Graner, one of the founders of the factory

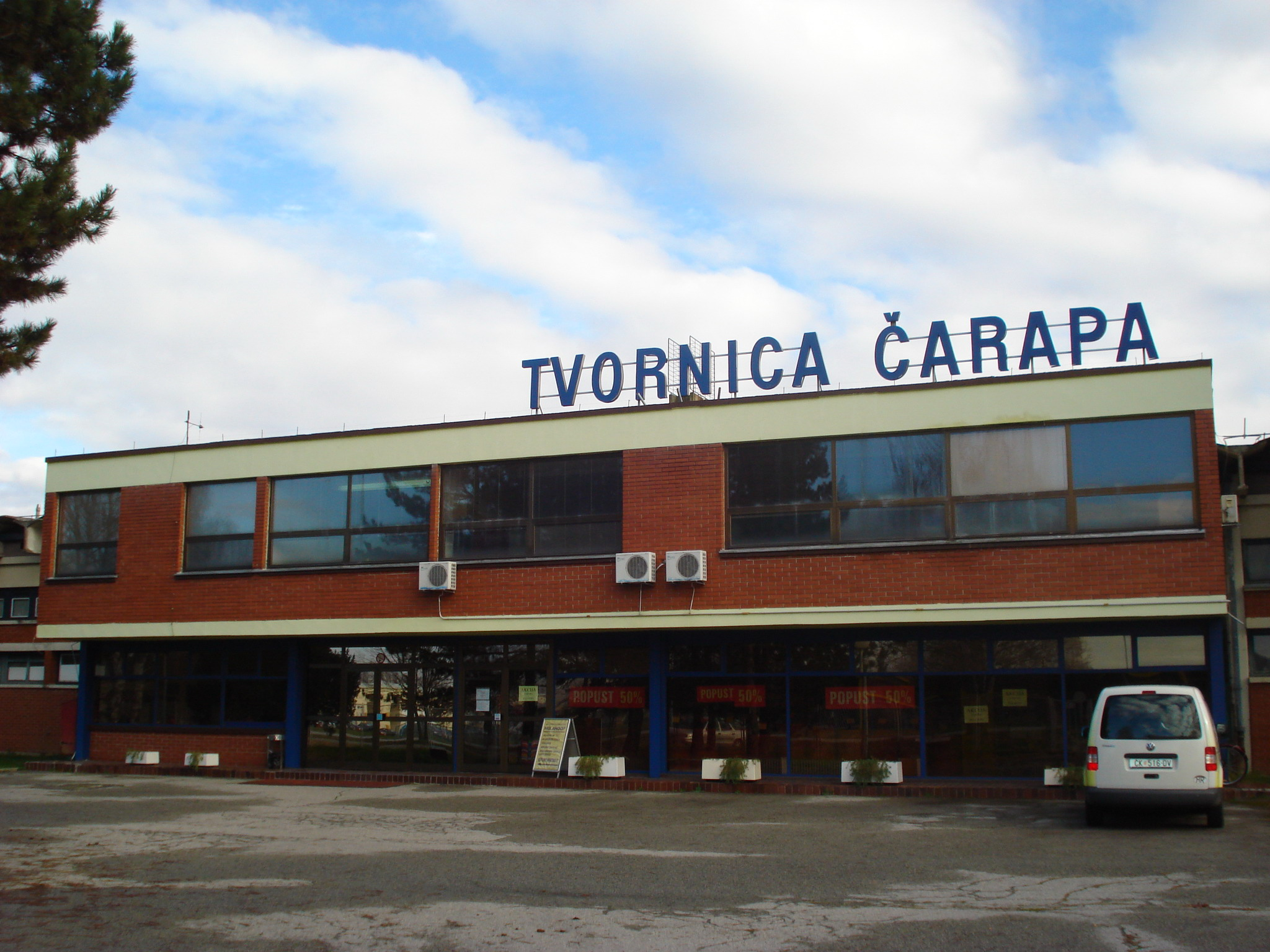
MTČ socks factory in Čakovec suburb

The history of Međimurska Trikotaža Čakovec goes back to 1923, when a factory of ribbons and laces for shoelaces was founded in Čakovec and subsequently started operating in January of that year. Its founders were the brothers Hinko, Moritz and Max Graner, entrepreneurs from Čakovec of Jewish origin. In 1924 the factory, which was called "Braća Graner", expanded its business and began to produce socks.

In the 1930s, several new businessmen invested in the factory, several dozen of new workers were employed and the production of knitted articles began, so that the company became one of the largest in its branch in Central Europe. In 1936, the last of the brothers died and Hinko's son Miroslav Graner became the owner.

At the end of the Second World War the company was expropriated, and the new communist government nationalized privately owned assets of the Graner family into public assets, i.e. state ownership. The name of the company was changed in 1946 to "Međimurska trikotaža Čakovec". Around 500 workers were employed in the factory in the first post-war years, and it produced underwear, outerwear, socks, haberdashery products (ribbons, shoelaces) etc. In addition to Čakovec, several new subsidiary factories were also established in some other settlements in Međimurje region (Mursko Središće, Kotoriba, Turčišće). The number of employees was constantly increasing, so that in 1962 there were 1,940 of them, and in the 1980s this number reached 3,500.

During the late socialist period in the former federal state, MTČ was organized as a "labour organization" (RO) that included several so called "basic organizations of associated work" (OOUR). The information published in the media in that period about the physical volume of production in MTČ said that there were more than 10 million knitted products, 11 million pairs of socks and more than 100 million meters of MTČ's haberdashery products on the market. In its OOURs, the company had plants for the production of raw and finished knitted material (including dyeing) and its storage, as well as modelling workshop (where samples and models of finished products were made), a tailoring department, a sewing unit, a packaging section and a warehouse of finished goods. There were also separate factories for the production of socks, stockings and haberdashery, as well as units for technical and auxiliary work, including maintenance of machines, transport and workers' restaurant.

In the knitting factory there were various machines producing numerous types of knitted materials in diverse widths, from cotton-fine rib, single jersey and interlock to knitted terry, plush and others, made in general from a mixture of cotton and artificial fibers (mainly acetate, polyester and polyamide). Various ready-made knitted products were cut and sewn from these materials, from infant clothing (e.g. baby undershirts, bodysuits, sleepsuits, rompers, or baby and toddler overalls), over children's, women's and men's underwear, to pyjamas, T-shirts, polo shirts, sweatshirts, sportswear, tracksuits, swimsuits and many other items.

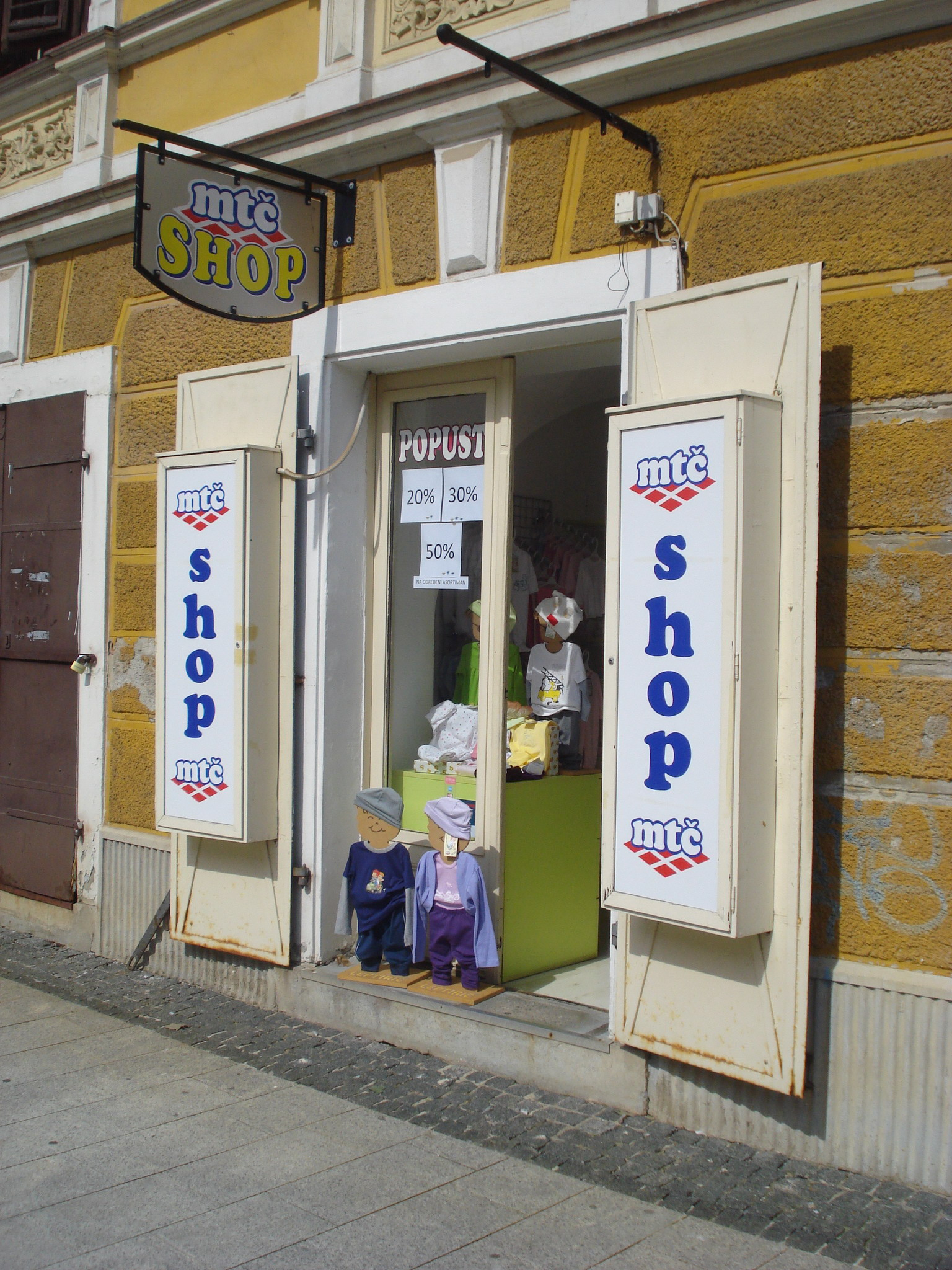
One of MTČ’s shops in Čakovec

At the beginning of the 1990s, as the independent Republic of Croatia was established, a big change occurred, because the so-called social enterprise MTČ was reprivatized. Due to its complexity, the process of conversion and privatization took several years, so Međimurska trikotaža Čakovec was registered in the Commercial court register in Varaždin, under registration number 1-154, as “Međimurska trikotaža, joint-stock company, Čakovec”, and by decision of the Commercial Court in Varaždin from 30 November 1995, harmonization of general acts with the Commercial law was carried out.

Soon after reprivatization, the company was split into several smaller ones, first in the form of limited liability companies, and then as joint-stock companies, among which were MTČ d.d. Čakovec (as holding company), MTČ Tvornica rublja d.d. Čakovec, MTČ Tvornica čarapa d.d. Čakovec, MTČ Tvornica dječje trikotače d.d. Prelog, MTČ Tvornica konfekcije d.d. Kotoriba, MTČ Tvornica trikotaže d.d. Štrigova, MTČ Tvornica športske odjeće d.d. Čakovec and MTČ Međunarodna špedicija I transport d.d. Čakovec. In the following years, further organizational changes took place, the business results began to worsen, losses occurred more and more often, and in the end, most of the companies ended up in bankruptcy and finally in liquidation. Business premises (buildings, land etc.) of liquidated companies were sold at auction, and some factory buildings, mostly in poor condition, were demolished by new owners.

== Legacy ==
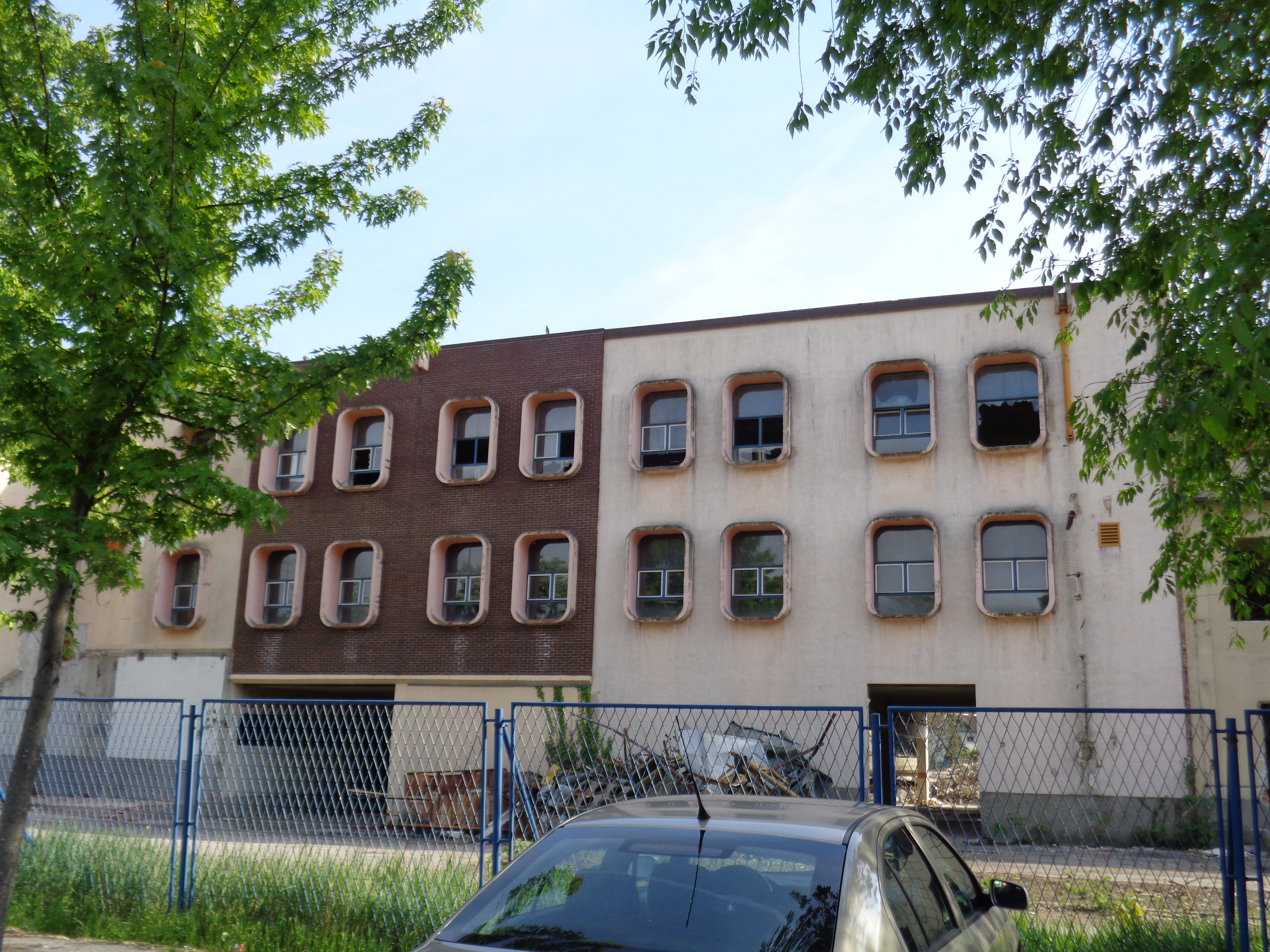
Abandoned production (tailoring department) hall of MTČ in the center of Čakovec before demolition

Among the companies that survived bankruptcy and arose from the former MTČ group, only "MTČ Tvornica trikotaže d.d." Štrigova is active today, producing almost exclusively infant clothing. In Mursko Središće, the former local MTČ factory for the production of ribbons, shoelaces and laces changed the ownership and was renamed Pozamanterija - m.t.č. d.o.o. (P-m.t.č. d.o.o.), under which name it still operates today. In Čakovec, there are two sister companies called Enigma design d.o.o. and Enigma stars d.o.o., established in 2013 and 2014, which produce and sell knitted products under the brand names MTČ and Enigma, mostly men's and women's underwear.

== See also ==
- Industry of Croatia
- History of clothing and textiles
- Čakovečki mlinovi
