= Kandit =

Croatian confectionery company

Kandit d.d.
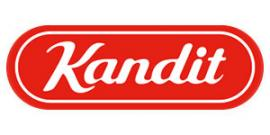
- Type: Joint-stock company
- Industry: Food processing
- Founded: 1920
- Headquarters: Osijek, Croatia
- Area served: Worldwide
- Products: chocolate bars, jelly candy, bonbons, desserts
- Revenue: HRK 264.8 million (2019)
- Net income: HRK 1.7 million (2019)
- Number of employees: 410 (2019)
- Parent: Mepas d.o.o.
- Website: www.kandit.hr

Kandit is a Croatian confectionery company producing chocolate and jelly products which is headquartered in Osijek. The company, together with Zvečevo and Kraš, made up 97% of the confectionery industry in 2020 Croatia. Exports make up 47% of Kandit's revenue. The company was acquired by Mepas of Bosnia and Herzegovina in 2011 for 6 million euros.

== History ==
The company was founded in 1920 under the name "Prva osječka tvornica kandita Kaiser i Stark", and subsequently obtained a licence from the Viennese chocolate factory Pischinger and began producing chocolate, wafers and candy. The company reached peak production during the 60s, as part of Yugoslavia, when it produced 6.395 tonnes of bonbon in a single year alone. In 2009, it opened a new production line as part of its existing factory with modern equipment and strandards.

Širokobriješka company Mepas, which imports and distributes Croatian and foreign brands in Bosnia and Herzegovina, in 2011 takes over Kandit d.o.o. Mepas enters into a Preliminary Agreement with Kandit Group on the transfer and takeover of business shares, whereby Mepas becomes the 100% owner of Kandit and the value of the transaction is six million euros. Immediately after the takeover, Kandit joined the Mepas Group.
