= AD Plastik =

Croatian automotive part manufacturer

- AD Plastik logo
- Type: Joint stock company
- Traded as: ZSE: ADPL
- ISIN: HRADPLRA0006
- Industry: Automotive
- Founded: 1952; 74 years ago in Solin, SR Croatia
- Headquarters: Solin, Croatia
- Number of locations: 8 (see Organization)
- Area served: Worldwide
- Key people: Katija Klepo (CEO)
- Products: see Products
- Revenue: € 152.96 million (2024)
- Operating income: 152,440,000 (2024)
- Net income: € 2.13 million (2024)
- Number of employees: 1802 (2024)
- Divisions: 7 (see Organization)
- Subsidiaries: 1 (see Organization)
- Website: www.adplastik.hr

AD Plastik is a manufacturer of components for the automotive industry based in Solin, Croatia. The company specializes in development and manufacturing of parts from various materials for both the exterior and interior of a car and is one of the leading companies in Eastern Europe in that segment. As of 2023, it is part of the CROBEX share index of the Zagreb Stock Exchange. The AD Plastik Group also includes, in addition to its operations in Croatia, several smaller companies and factories located in Romania, Hungary, Serbia, and Russia. More than 90% of its output is exported to customers in Western Europe, such as Renault, Stellantis and Peugeot.

== History ==
=== Jugoplastika (1968–1992) ===
The »Galanterija« ('Haberdashery') and »Termoprerada kombinat« ('Thermal processing plant') plants in Split began in 1968 the production of interior car parts (door and roof linings, sunshades, thermoformed wallpapers, mats and seat protectors) for the Zavod Crvena Zastava (Kragujevac), Citroën, Renault, Fiat, Lada, Dacia and Volkswagen. In the early 1980s, the department in Muć began the production of metal haberdashery, and parts and accessories for motor vehicles were produced by the »Brizgalice« ('Syringes') plant from Solin, »Profili« ('Profiles') from Makarska, »Termooblikovanje« ('Thermoforming') from Split and »Obrada metala« ('Metal processing') from Muć and together they employ about 2,000 workers. In 1988, these plants separated into RO Jugoplastika – Autodijelovi.

=== AD Plastik ===
RO Autodijelovi was separated from Jugoplastika in 1992, and in 1994 it changed its name to the current one, and in 2001 it was privatized according to the model of employee shareholding. In the 2010s, the company employed 3,000 workers in factories in Solin, Zagreb, Luga and Tolyatti in Russia, Piteşti in Romania, Tiszaújváros in Hungary and Mladenovac in Serbia, producing panels for instruments, door linings, bumpers, decorative parts and static and dynamic seals. A smaller part of the production consists of different types of packaging for the food and pharmaceutical industry and injection molded products. Part of the production process is automated.

== Products ==
Its key products include instrument and door panels, handles, carpets, car hoods, sun visors, spoilers, deflectors, bumpers, diffusers, and so on.

Company produces more than 10 million products annually for about 80 car models.

== Organization ==
As of 2024, AD Plastik Group has seven divisions and a subsidiary company:

- AD Plastik d.d.: Solin and Zagreb (Jankomir), Croatia
- AD Plastik Tisza Kft. (Tiszaújváros, Hungary)
- ADP d.o.o. (Mladenovac, Serbia)
- AO AD Plastik Togliatti (Vintai, Samara, Russia)
- ZAO AD Plastik Kaluga (Kaluga, Russia)
- AD Plastik d.o.o. (Novo Mesto, Slovenia)
- Subsidiary: Euro Auto Plastic Systems S.R.L. (Mioveni, Romania)

AD Klaster is a business cluster initiated by ADP that includes Croatian automotive industry and plastic production companies, as well as several faculties of the University of Zagreb and Croatian Chamber of Commerce.

== Acknowledgements ==
- Zlatna kuna award of the Croatian Chamber of Commerce "for the best large Croatian company in 2012".
- Charter of the Republic of Croatia (2013), "for exceptional contribution to the economic and social development of the Republic of Croatia"
- Member of United Nations Global Compact (March 2013).
- Golden Key for "the most innovative exporter in 2024" of the Convention of Croatian exporters (2024)
- Golden Key for "the best exporter in Slovenia in 2025" of the Convention of Croatian exporters (2026)
