= Dragutin Wolf =

Croatian businessman (1866–1927)

- Born: 1866; Bjelovar, Austrian Empire, (now Croatia)
- Died: 1927 (aged 61); Bjelovar, Kingdom of Serbs, Croats and Slovenes
- Occupation: Industrialist
- Known for: food company Koestlin
- Spouse: Irma Wolf
- Children: Slavko Wolf; Otto Wolf

Dragutin Wolf (1866–1927) was a Croatian Jewish industrialist and founder of the food company Koestlin in Bjelovar.

== Life and career ==
Wolf was born in Bjelovar to a Jewish family. With his wife Irma Wolf he had two sons, Slavko and Otto. Wolf owned a small bakery for bread and cakes in Bjelovar which was founded on November 11, 1892. One decade later, Wolf started to focus on the production of baked goods with a prolonged shelf life. In 1905 he founded the food company "Tvornica keksa, dvopeka, biskvita i finih poslastica Dragutina Wolfa i sinova" (Factory of biscuits, rusks and delicious pastries Dragutin Wolf and sons) which specialized in confectionery products. The factory was located in Šenoa Street, near the Wolf family villa. In 1921, the company began to produce biscuits and wafers. Wolf lead the business with his sons and soon became one of the wealthiest people in Bjelovar. He owned the first car in Bjelovar and his family villa was regarded as the most luxurious property in town. Wolf died in 1927 and was buried at a Jewish cemetery in Bjelovar.

== Family and legacy ==
After his death his sons took over the company. In 1932 Otto and Slavko Wolf agreed cooperation with Koestlin in Hungary, which was founded by Hungarian industrialist Lajos Koestlin at the end of 19th. century, for marketing the products based on their recipes. They were also allowed to distribute the products under the Koestlin brand.

During the Holocaust, in 1942, Wolf's widow Irma committed suicide, unable to live with the knowledge of the Holocaust and so much hate toward the Jews. Wolf's sons joined and fought with the Partisans during World War II. After the war Wolf's company was nationalized, in 1947, by the Yugoslav Communists. Wolf's son Otto and his family made Aliyah to Israel in 1949. In 2011 after a 14 year court process Wolf's only living heirs, his great-grandchildren, Miriam Wolkoon from Israel and Boris Bukač–Wolf from Bjelovar were partly compensated with the return of nationalized property in the form of shares and money.
