= Chocolate with rice =

Croatian confectionery

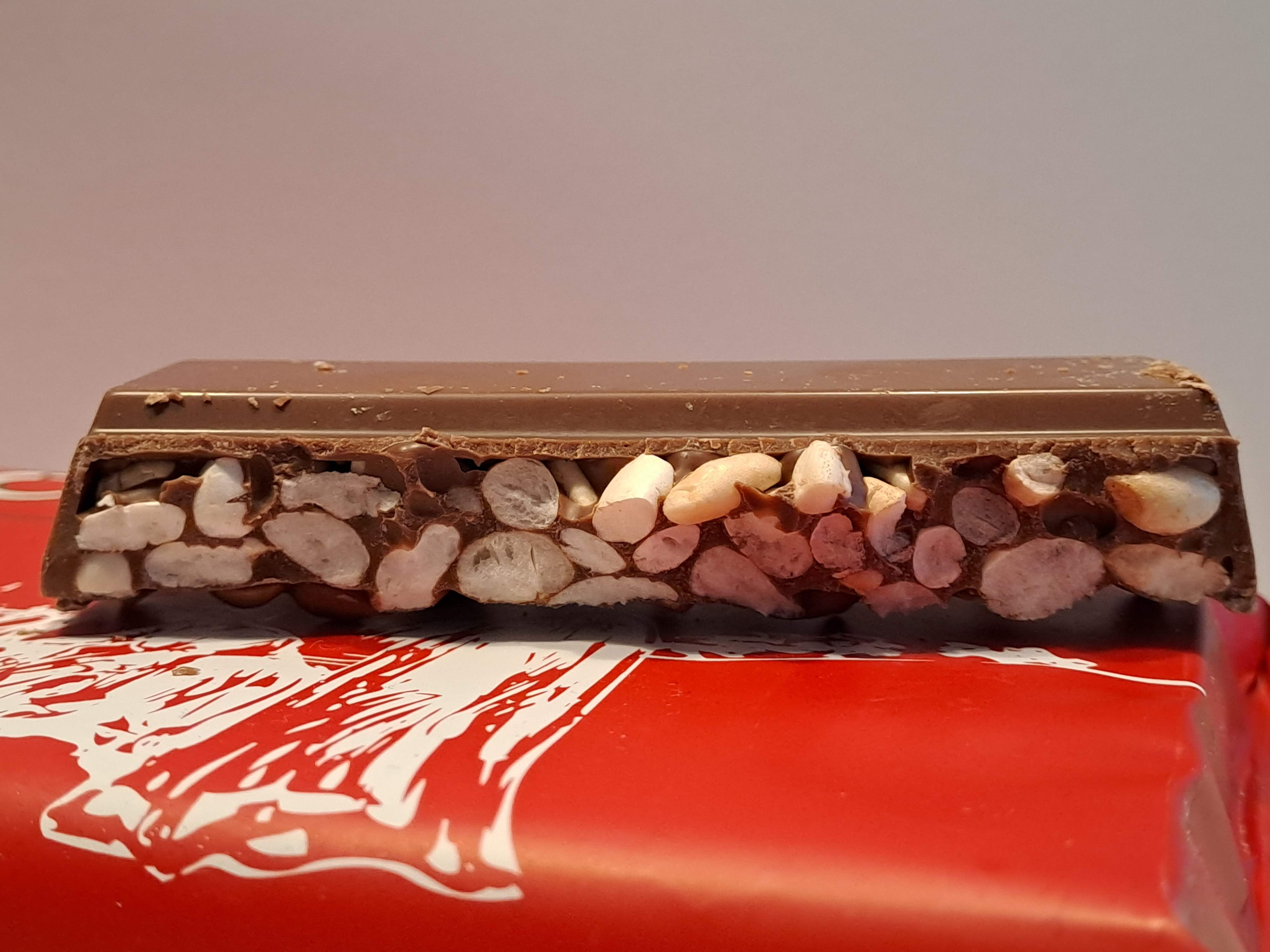
Crosssection of the Mikado chocolate with rice

Chocolate with rice, sometimes called rice chocolate, is a Croatian sweet invented in 1963 by the Croatian (then Yugoslav) food company Zvečevo. It is made using 90-percent milk chocolate and puffed rice mixed together and cooled into a standard chocolate bar mold. The name given to the chocolate bar was Mikado, an obsolete Western term used for the Emperor of Japan.
