= Viro (company) =

Croatian company operating a sugar refinery

Coordinates: 45°51′24″N 17°23′52″E

Viro tvornica šećera d.d.
- Type: Public company
- Traded as: ZSE: VIRO (until 5 January 2024)
- Industry: Food products
- Founded: 2002
- Headquarters: Virovitica, Croatia
- Key people: Željko Zadro (CEO)
- Number of employees: 250 (as of 2007)
- Website: www.secerana.hr

The Viro sugar factory (Croatian: Viro tvornica šećera), commonly referred to as just Viro, is a sugar refinery based in Virovitica, Croatia.

The refinery was originally built in 1980 and had the daily refining capacity of 4,000 tons of sugar beet. Established as an independent company, it was briefly part of the PIK Virovitica agricultural company between 1984 and 1991. In the 1990s the refinery experienced a steady decline in revenue and income which resulted in it being bought and re-bought several times in the late 1990s, before eventually being acquired by the Dutch company Cosun and shortly after that filing for bankruptcy in 1999, with debts totaling some 575 million HRK. After a period of internal restructuring the refinery's property was sold to two Croatian-based companies for 110 million HRK in 2002, after which the company was re-established as a limited liability company in September 2002. The company's shares were listed on the Zagreb Stock Exchange in April 2006.

The company had managed to successfully bounce back in the late 2000s and it became the biggest such refinery in Croatia, with a 37 percent market share in the local sugar refining sector as of 2007.

In April 2006, Viro's shares began to be listed on the Zagreb Stock Exchange. The sugar factory will soon become the largest sugar refinery, which in 2007 had a 37% market share. The company's shares were listed on the Zagreb Stock Exchange (ZSE) and included in the share index CROBEX until September 2020. The shares were delisted trading the ZSE in January 2024.

On 2 May 2020, although it was the most technologically advanced sugar factory in Croatia, although Virovitica was promoted as a "sweet city", Viro will no longer produce sugar from sugar beet and will not be this year's sugar beet campaign due to "business rationalization". There remains very little questionable possibility of sugar cane processing, the so-called "yellow campaign". Most workers will be laid off by management on severance pay (or minimum wage until the end of the year, with questionable status thereafter) or will retire if they have the conditions.

== See also ==
- List of companies of the Socialist Federal Republic of Yugoslavia
