= Croatia osiguranje =

Croatia osiguranje d.d.
- Type: Public
- Traded as: ZSE: CROS
- Founded: 4 June 1884
- Headquarters: Zagreb, Croatia
- Number of locations: 17 branches
- Key people: Damir Vanđelić, Chairman of the Board; Roberto Škropac, Chairman of the Supervisory Board
- Services: Insurance
- Total assets: €541 million (2024)
- Number of employees: 2,653 (30 June 2014)
- Parent: Adris Grupa
- Website: www.crosig.hr

Croatia osiguranje d.d. (English: Croatia Insurance) is an insurance company based in Zagreb.

Croatia osiguranje is the largest and oldest insurance firm in Croatia. As of 2018, its share in the Croatian insurance market is approximately 32%.

Branches: Podružnica Dubrovnik, Podružnica Kutina, Podružnica Osijek, Podružnica Pula, Podružnica Rijeka, Podružnica Slavonski Brod, Podružnica Split, Podružnica Varaždin, Podružnica Zabok, Podružnica Zadar, Podružnica Zagreb, Podružnica Zagrebački prsten-Velika Gorica.

== History ==
Croatia osiguranje was founded in 1884 in Zagreb as the "Croatia" Insurance Cooperative. The company’s establishment was supported by prominent figures of the Croatian National Revival, including August Šenoa and Gjuro Deželić. Throughout the 20th century, the company’s legal structure changed to reflect shifting political systems, including periods as a state-owned enterprise in the Kingdom of Yugoslavia and later the SFR Yugoslavia.

In 2014, the Croatian government privatized the company. A majority stake was acquired by Adris grupa, which remains the controlling shareholder.

== Digital Services ==
=== LAQO ===
In 2020, Croatia osiguranje launched LAQO, a digital insurance brand. It operates as a mobile and web-based platform, allowing users to purchase and manage policies without physical documentation. The service focuses primarily on non-life insurance, such as motor vehicle insurance and travel insurance.

=== Cryptocurrency Integration ===
In 2022, the company began accepting cryptocurrency as a form of payment for its insurance premiums. This was implemented through a partnership with the payment processor Electrocoin via the PayCek platform. This made Croatia osiguranje the first major insurer in the Adriatic region to accept digital assets for payment.
