= Koestlin =

Croatian food company

Koestlin d.d.
- Company type: Public
- Traded as: ZSE: KOES
- Industry: Confectionery production
- Founded: 1905 (as Tvornica keksa, dvopeka, biskvita i finih poslastica Dragutina Wolfa i sinova); 1932 (incorporated as Koestlin)
- Founder: Dragutin Wolf
- Headquarters: Bjelovar, Croatia
- Key people: Krešimir Pajić (CEO)
- Products: Confectionery
- Owner: Mirko Grbešić
- Number of employees: 450
- Parent: Mepas d.o.o.
- Website: www.koestlin.hr/home

Koestlin is a Croatian food company based in Bjelovar, specializing in confectionery products.

Koestlin was founded in 1905 by Croatian Jewish industrialist Dragutin Wolf. In 1921, the company began to produce biscuits and wafers. In 1932 Wolf's sons, Otto and Slavko Wolf agreed cooperation with Koestlin in Hungary, which was founded by Hungarian industrialist Lajos Koestlin at the end of 19th century. Koestlin was nationalized after World War II by Yugoslav Communists. Today Koestlin holds the second place in Croatian manufacture and sale of wafers and biscuits with a share of 25%, while sales and production exceeding 50 tonnes per day. Koestlin is a member of the Mepas group, owned by Bosnia and Herzegovina entrepreneur Mirko Grbešić.

Today, Koestlin ranks second in Croatian confectionery production, accounting for 25%. Sales exceed 50 tons per day. The company exports its products to Slovenia, Bosnia and Herzegovina, Macedonia, the United States, Sweden, Canada, Slovakia, the Czech Republic, Romania, Russia, Serbia, Israel, Jordan, Australia, the United Arab Emirates, Britain, Bulgaria, Austria and Switzerland.

== See also ==
- List of bean-to-bar chocolate manufacturers
