= GK Međimurje =

Građevni kombinat 'Međimurje'
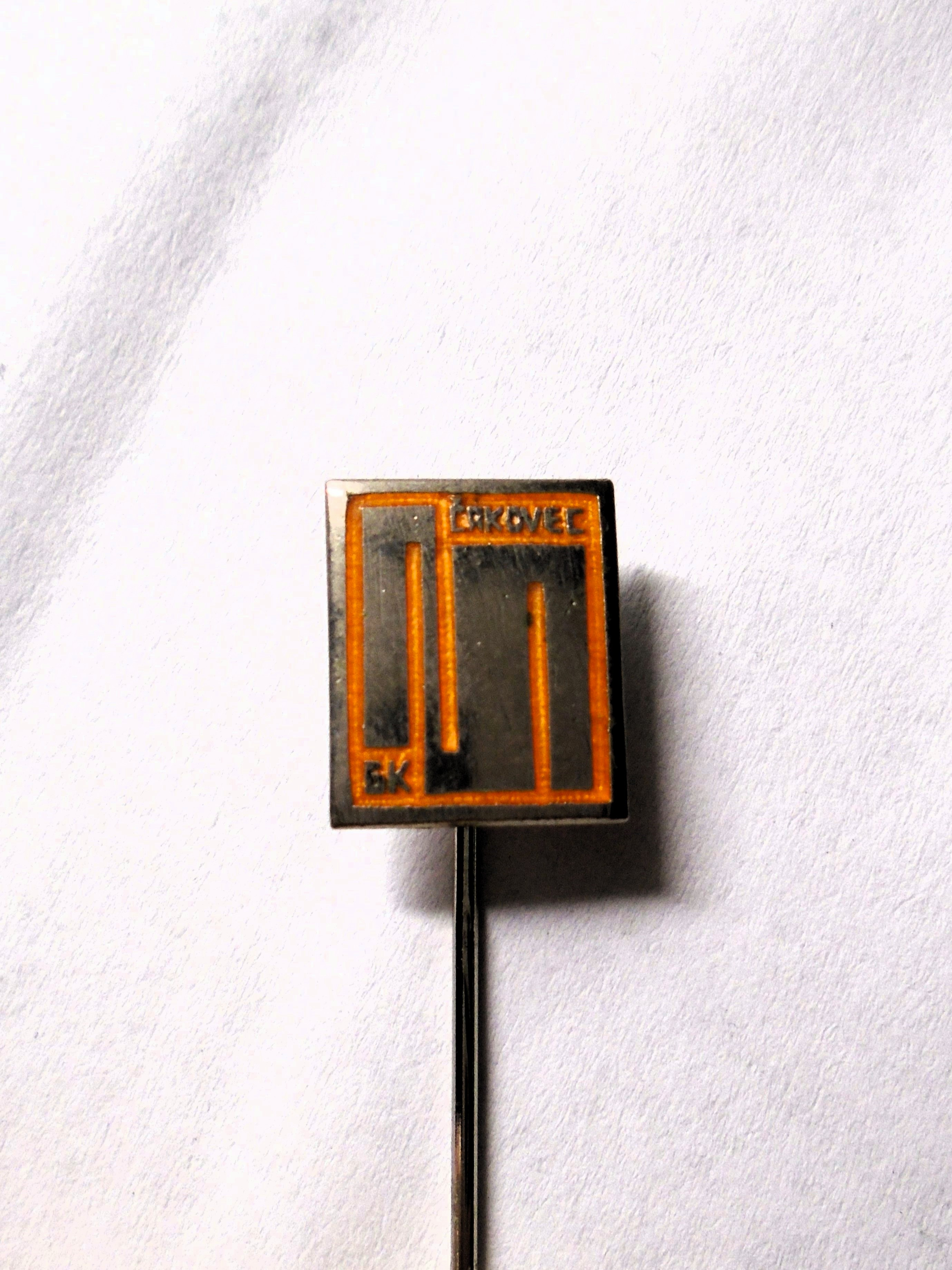
- Pin badge of the company
- Type: Public company
- Industry: construction, civil engineering, building materials, architecture
- Founded: 1 October 1963
- Defunct: 8 November 2010
- Fate: Bankruptcy
- Headquarters: Čakovec, Croatia
- Products: bricks, building timber, gravel, concrete, buildings, roads, architectural engineering, construction management etc.
- Total assets: HRD 1,010,603,000 (1991)
- Number of employees: ~8,500 (1980s)

Građevni kombinat 'Međimurje' (English: 'Međimurje' Construction Company), also known as GK Međimurje, was a large Croatian legal entity whose core business was construction and building materials industry. Based in Čakovec, seat of Međimurje County, it was one of the flagships of the economy of Međimurje region in the 1970s and 1980s as well as one of the most significant construction companies in former Yugoslavia, carrying out works on a number of large structures, from hotels on the Adriatic coast to hospitals, schools and various office buildings in Zagreb and other Croatian cities (for example, the INA building in Šubićeva Street in Zagreb), as well as sports facilities, among which the most famous are those for Winter Olympics 1984. in Sarajevo. During the 1990s, GK Međimurje slowly fell into financial difficulties and most parts of the business ended up in liquidation, with only a few surviving and still operating today.

== History ==
The story of Građevni kombinat 'Međimurje' begins in the 1960s, as several smaller construction and civil engineering companies in social ownership were merged on 1 October 1963 into a larger company called Građevno poduzeće 'Međimurje' ('Međimurje' Construction Enterprise). This business engaged in the construction of all types of buildings, including architectural design, architectural engineering, preparatory and earthworks, masonry and assembly, and the performance of installation and final works. In addition, the company included a gravel pit, a concrete plant, a brickyard and later a sawmill. Within a few operating years, the company employed around 2,200 workers and had a total revenue of 200 million dinars, demonstrating constant growth.

A significant business development occurred in 1978 when GK Međimurje merged with Hidrotehnika, a Čakovec company specializing in hydraulic engineering, waterworks, sewerage and drainage systems. The so-called Work organization Građevni kombinat 'Međimurje' was then established with more than six thousand employees, and the business expanded to include civil engineering, energy supply, and public utility services. During the 1980s, the company's scope of business was the largest in both Croatia and in other former Yugoslav republics. The number of employees increased to more than 8,000.

With the independence of the Republic of Croatia, major changes occurred. First the Work organization was renamed to the Social Enterprise Građevni kombinat 'Međimurje'. Next, the company converted its individual business units into 19 joint-stock companies and finally, the Business System of GK 'Međimurje' was formed. According to the balance sheet of 31 December 1991, the company's assets were stated to be HRD 1,010,603,000, which according to the exchange rate of DEM 1 = HRD 55, amounted to DEM 18,374,600.-. The largest of the new 19 companies was Međimurje-Visokogradnja d.d., which had a share capital of DEM 6,826,000,- after the transformation process on 28 May 1993. In 1994 the company employed 1,207 workers, generated HRK 120,727,673 of total revenue and incurred HRK 119,225,650 of total expenses. The whole period of privatization lasted from 1992 to 2000.

Some of the joint-stock companies within GK 'Međimurje' ran into difficulties in the 1990s and 2000s, and eventually ceased to exist. This was due to a combination of circumstances: the fragmentation of the Business System GK 'Međimurje', the state of the construction and civil engineering markets, poor management of the company, lack of an adequate workforce, liquidity problems and capital accumulation failure. The Business System itself did not survive either, and was deleted from the Commercial court register in Varaždin on 8 November 2010. However, some of its joint-stock companies (for example Međimurje PMP, Međimurje-plin, and Međimurje-Tegra) managed to survive and even expand their business operations until today.

== Gallery ==
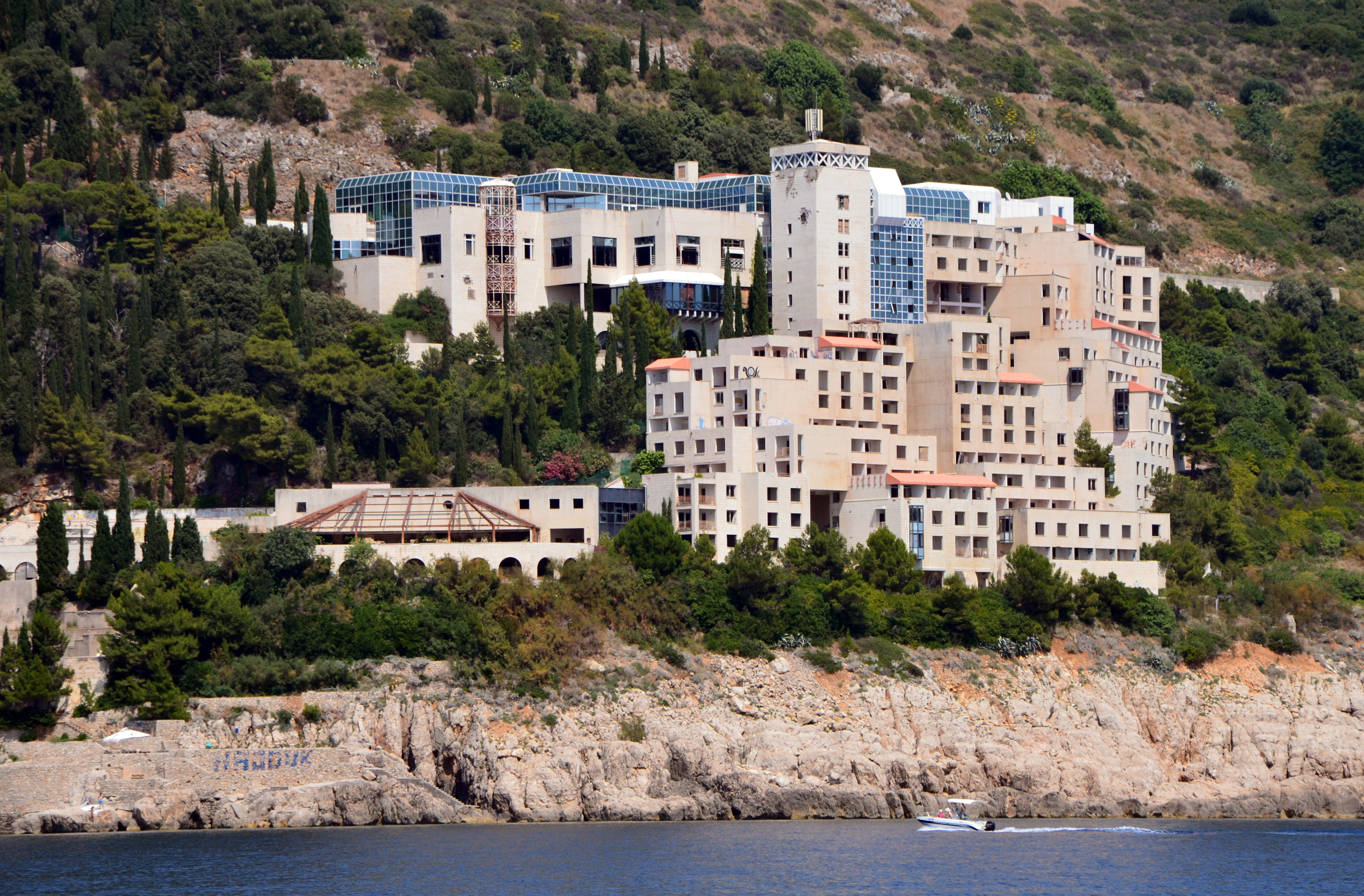
'Belvedere' Hotel in Dubrovnik

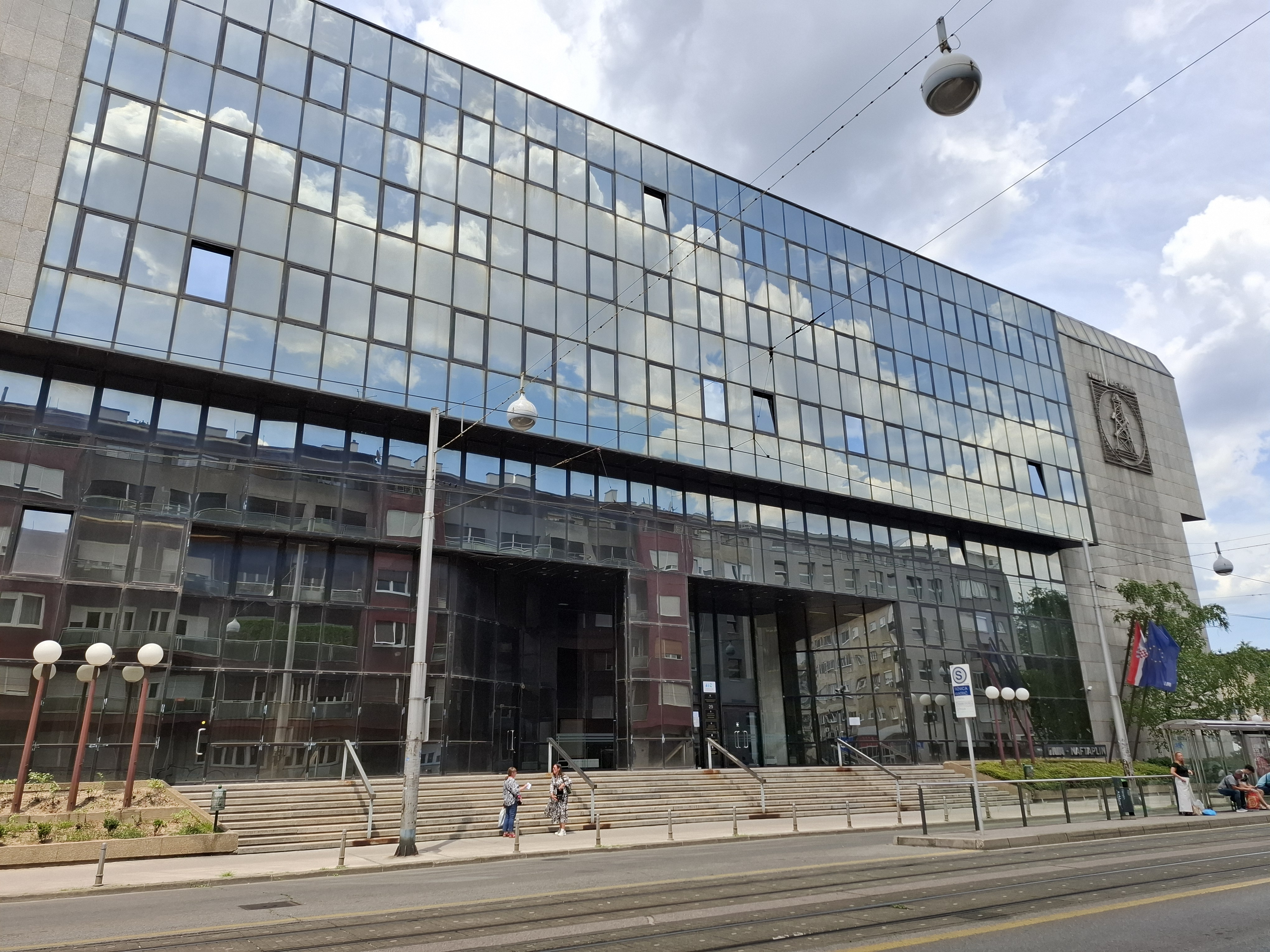
'INA' office building in Zagreb

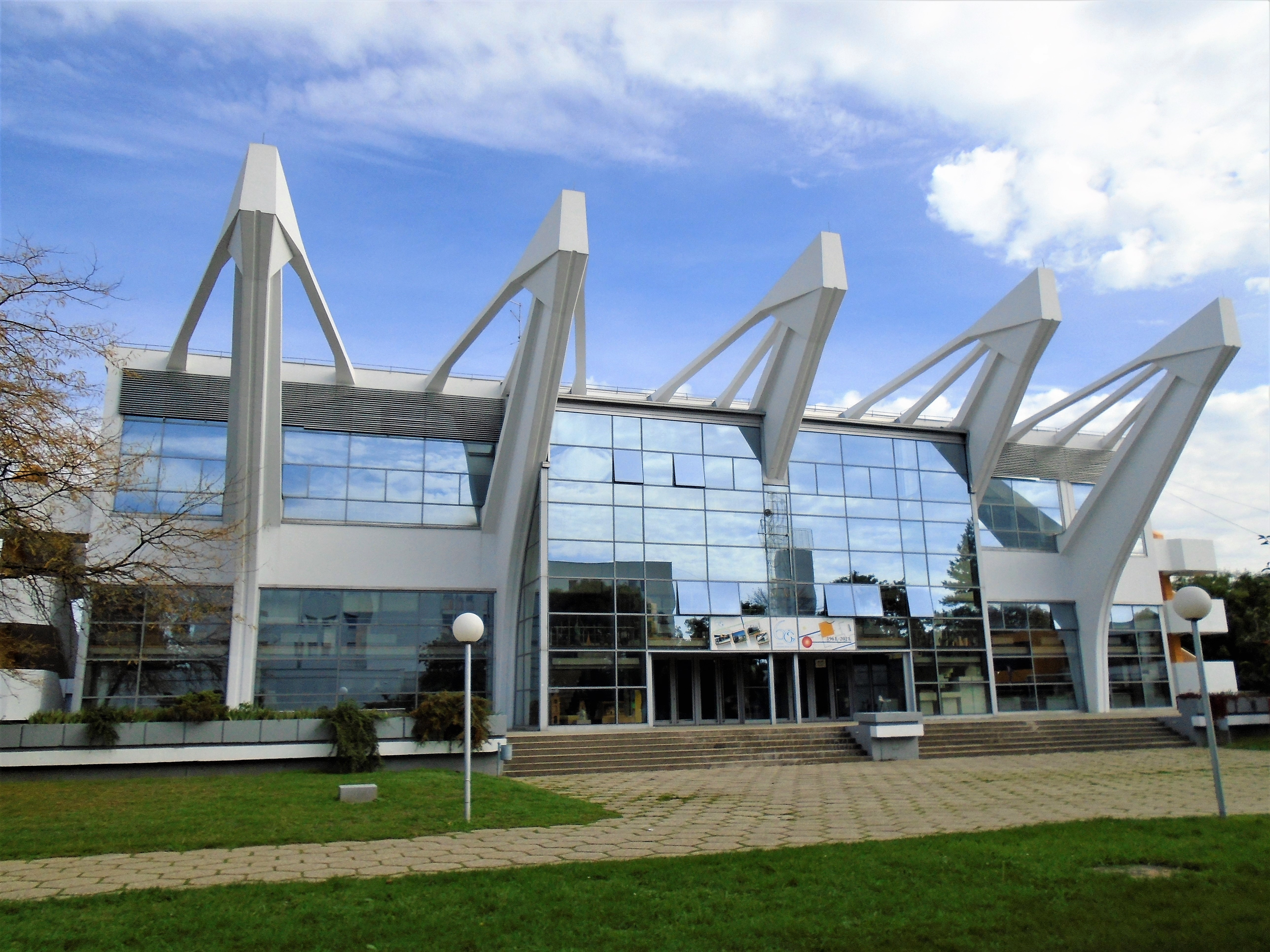
Sports hall in Čakovec

== See also ==
- Construction aggregate
- Međimurska trikotaža Čakovec
- Stadion SRC Mladost, Čakovec

== Sources ==
- Godinić Mikulčić, Vlatka (2025). "Građevni kombinat 'Međimurje'" ['Međimurje' Construction Company]. Renewed Life: Journal of Philosophy and Religious Studies (in Croatian). 1. Zagreb, Croatia: Miroslav Krleža Lexicographical Institute.
- Malekoci-Oletić, Božena (2019). "Nakon pada GK 'Međimurja' gradevinari se nikada nisu oporavili" [After the collapse of GK 'Međimurje', construction companies never recovered.]. Međimurske novine (in Croatian). Čakovec, Croatia: Međimurske novine.
- Vejzagić, Saša (2020) [2020]. Nikić-Čakar, Dario (ed.). "Tržište i grad: Simbioza poduzeća i općine u Jugoslaviji na primjeru Građevnog kombinata 'Međimurje' Čakovec (1963.-1981.))" [Market and City: Symbiosis of Enterprise and Municipality in Yugoslavia on the Example of the Međimurje Čakovec Construction Company (1963-1981)]. Politička misao (in Croatian). Zagreb: Faculty of Political Science, University of Zagreb.
- Jambor, Ivan (2003) [2003]. Krasić, Šima (ed.). "Izvješće o obavljenoj reviziji pretvorbe i privatizacije" [Report on the audit of conversion and privatization] (PDF). State Audit Office Report (in Croatian). Varaždin: Državni ured za reviziju.
