= Zvečevo =

Croatian food company

Zvečevo prehrambena industrija d.d.
- Type: Joint-stock company
- Industry: Food processing
- Founded: 20 October 1921
- Headquarters: Požega, Croatia
- Area served: Worldwide
- Key people: Denis Grozdanic (Director)
- Products: Chocolate confectionery
- Owner: Nestlé
- Website: www.zvecevo.hr

Zvečevo is a Croatian food company, specializing in confectionery products and spirits. The company was founded as Stock Cognac Medicinal in 1921 in Požega and produced strong alcoholic drinks. The company was rented to Nestlé from 1936 until 1946, when it also started producing chocolate and candy products. The company changed its name to Zvečevo d.d. Požega in 1951. In the 1960s, all efforts were aimed towards production of cocoa products, strong alcoholic drinks and milk powder, as the unprofitable and outdated production of fruit juices and flour was abandoned. A cooperation with Nestlé was established again in 1970 that lasted until 1995, when it became a joint-stock company. Zvečevo has designed the first rice chocolate in the world in 1964 and named it Mikado.

== Gallery ==
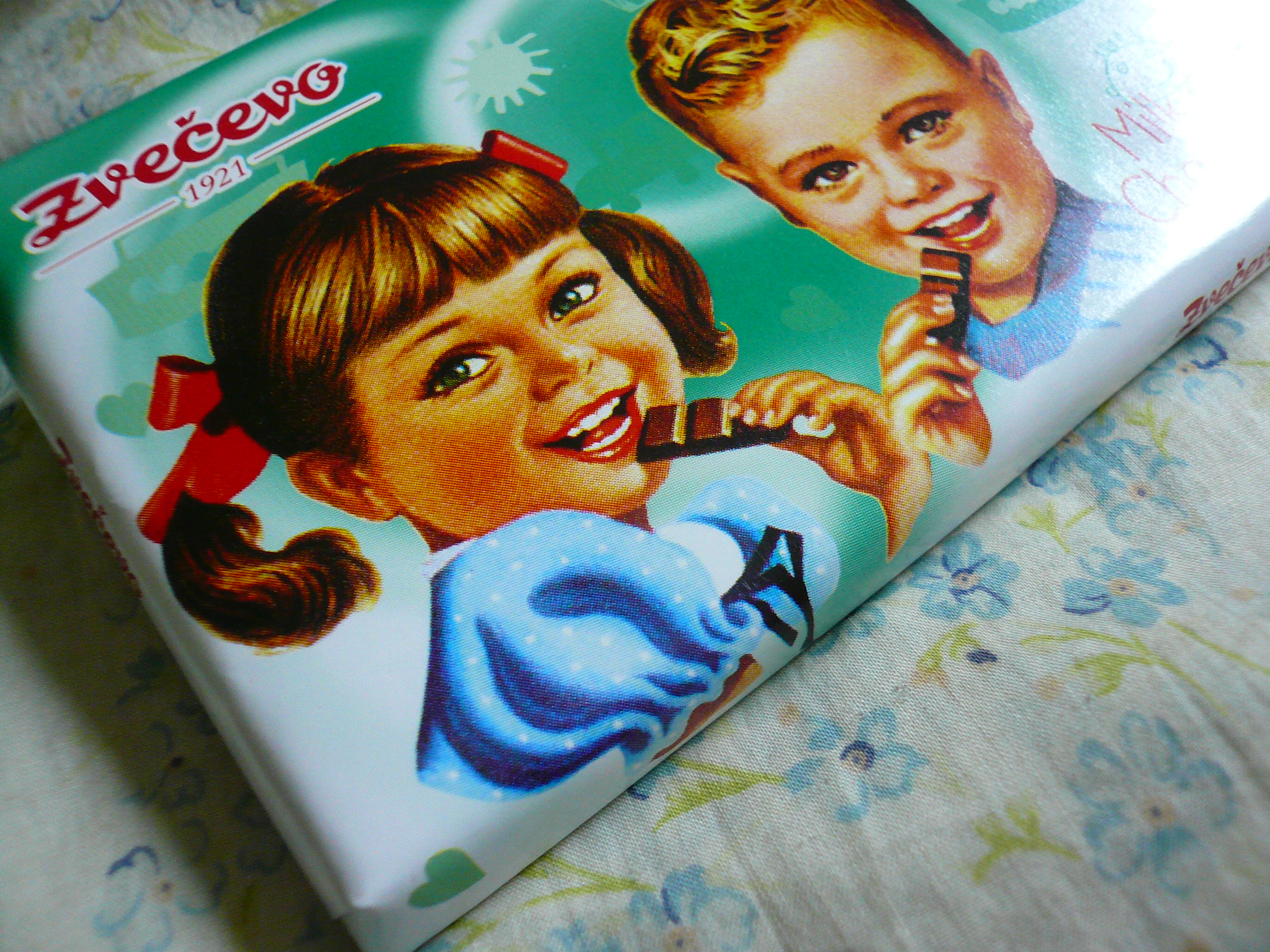

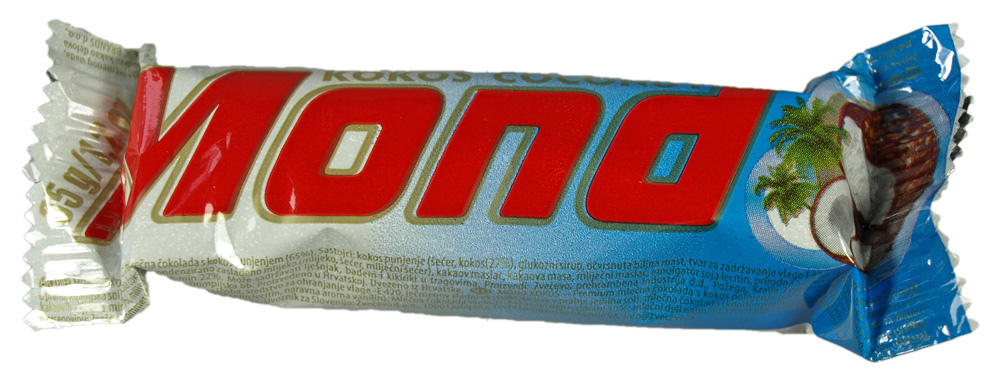

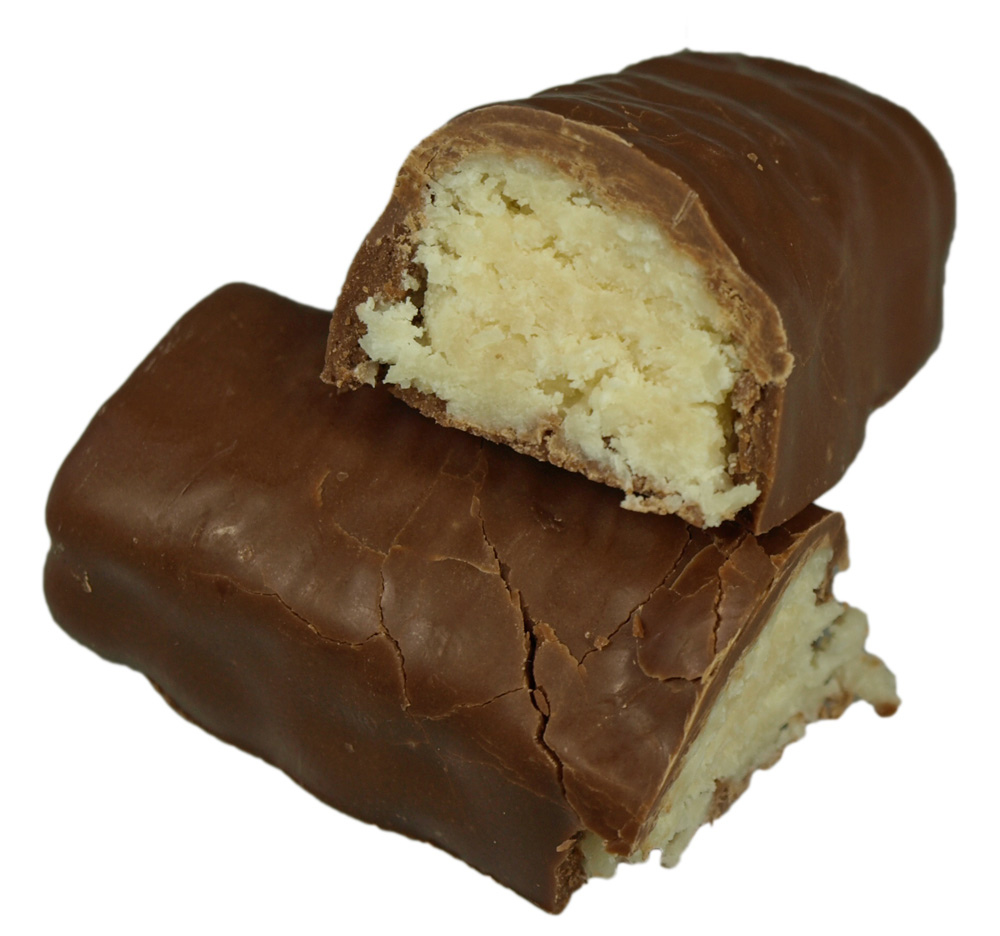

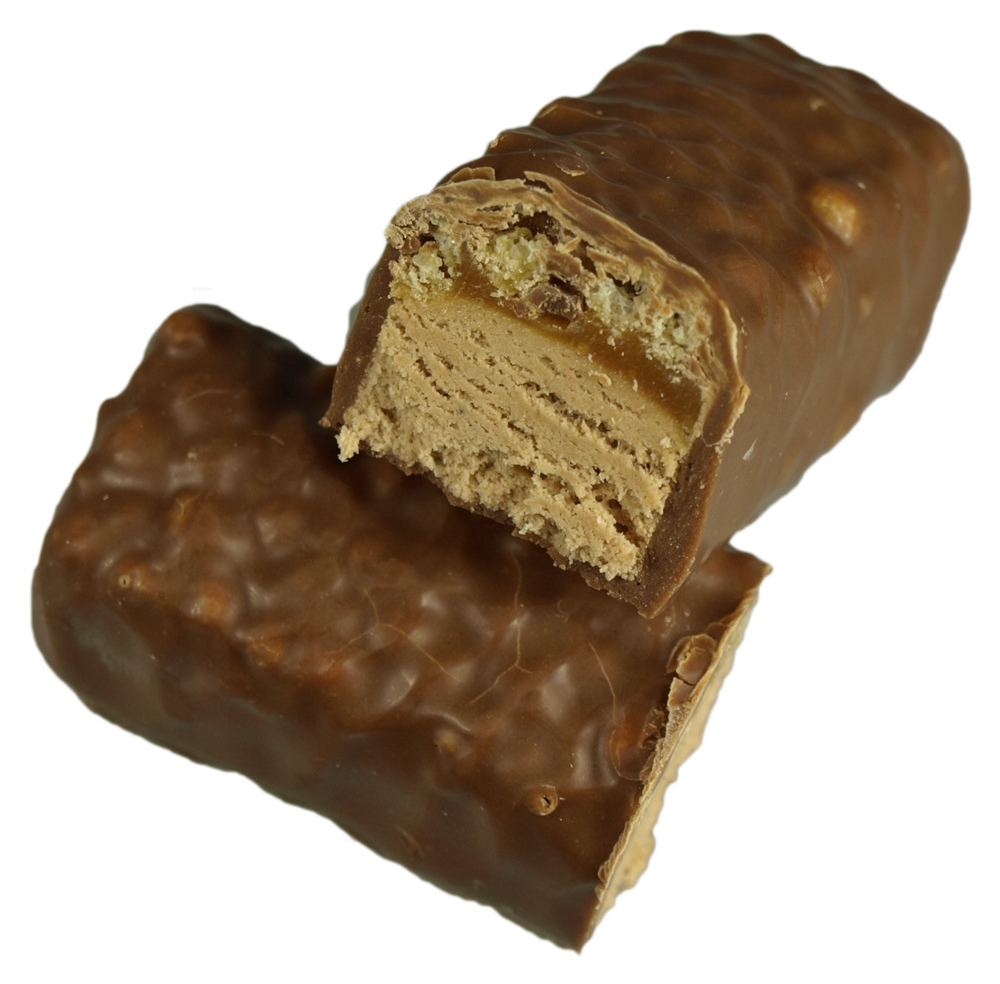

== Products ==
- Chocolate
- Confectionery
- Chocolate products
- Milk chocolate

== See also ==
- List of companies of Croatia
- List of Nestlé brands
