= Dalekovod =

Croatian company

Dalekovod d.d.
- Type: Public
- Traded as: ZSE: DLKV
- ISIN: HRDLKVRA0006
- Industry: Electrical engineering, civil engineering
- Founded: 1949
- Headquarters: Zagreb, Croatia
- Key people: Tomislav Rosandić (CEO)
- Revenue: ▲€280.2 million (2025)
- Net income: ▲€11.7 million (2025)
- Total assets: HRK 2,415.7 million (2010) ▲ from HRK 2,332.6 million in 2009
- Number of employees: 1,088 (2022)
- Website: dalekovod.hr

Dalekovod d.d. is a Croatian company, active in electrical engineering and civil engineering sectors. Its primary activities comprise design, production and construction of electrical power structures, electrical substations, power transmission mains, telecommunications structures, road equipment, railway equipment and street lighting. In 2010, net income of the company was 4.7 million kuna, exhibiting a decrease from 110.9 million kuna net income reported for 2009. At the end of the 2010, the company employed 1424 persons. Dalekovod was founded in 1949 as a state owned company, and restructured as a joint stock company in 1993 and subsequently listed at the Zagreb Stock Exchange. It is one of 24 companies included in the CROBEX share index. As of August 2011, head of the company is Luka Miličić. Recently the company has declared its plans to expand in the energy development sector, especially in the field of renewable energy. In 2012, Dalekovod plans to invest into and build a wind farm near Benkovac and Obrovac.
