= Orbico Group =

Croatian distribution and logistics company

- Industry: Distribution, Logistics
- Founded: Zagreb (1998; 28 years ago)
- Founders: Branko Roglić
- Headquarters: Zagreb, Croatia
- Area served: Worldwide
- Key people: Branko Roglić (CEO)
- Services: third-party logistics
- Revenue: ▲€4.27 billion (2024)
- Number of employees: ▲8000 (2020)
- Website: www.orbico.com

Orbico is a Croatian distribution and logistics company. It is one of the largest European distributors of consumer goods, and, as of 2023, the second largest Croatian company by revenue, behind Fortenova.

== History ==
Orbico Group is a distributor of a number of global brands, with significant presence in 50 countries, especially in Romania and Poland.

In 2019, it entered a partnership with Gideon Brothers, in which the company began using its autonomous robots inside its warehouses.

In 2023, it began building its largest distribution facility in Donja Zdenčina, Croatia, with an investment worth approximately 40 million €.

In 2024, the company partnered with Authentic Brands Group, becoming the official European distributor of the Dockers brand.
