= Geofoto =

Defunct Croatian company

- Type: LLC
- Industry: Geomatics; GIS; Aerial photography Photogrammetry; Cartography
- Founded: 1993
- Defunct: 2017
- Fate: Bankruptcy
- Headquarters: Zagreb, Croatia
- Revenue: ▲€15.39 million (2009)
- Number of employees: ▲260 (September 2010)
- Website: www.geofoto.hr

Geofoto was a Croatian company with 260 employees headquartered in Zagreb, Croatia with subsidiaries in Norway, North Macedonia, Slovenia, Bolivia, Argentina, United Arab Emirates, Czech Republic and United Kingdom. Its main fields are Geomatics activities such as photogrammetry and geographic information systems (GIS). In Croatia it has won a number of business awards.

== History ==
The company was founded in 1993 in Croatia and became the country's first aerial survey service and the lead producer of new topographic maps after the Croatian War of Independence. Exporting activities started in early 2000s (decade) and peaked in 2008 when the company acquired Geodetski zavod Slovenije d.d., the largest Slovenian surveying company for €4.5 million, ProCaptura, the Norwegian producer of advanced large format scanners, and Zenit, the largest Macedonian geodetic company.

In February 2010 the European Bank for Reconstruction and Development (EBRD) announced the acquisition of a 9.6% share of Geofoto for 4 million euros, estimating the value of the company to €42 million, and projecting its increase to €230 million in seven years. In March 2013, the EBRD has filed a petition for bankruptcy against the company.

After the fall of Croatia's Prime Minister Ivo Sanader, one of the closest friends of company owner Zvonko Biljecki, without his support the company slowly fell apart. In December 2017, company declared bankruptcy.

== Fleet and technology ==
For aerial survey purposes, the company owns four aircraft equipped with Vexcel UltraCamX digital cameras and a LiDAR mapping system IGI LiteMapper 6800-400:

- Cessna Citation II
- Piper Aztec
- Two Piper Cheyennes

== Awards ==
Geofoto is recipient of several awards in business, technology and humanitarian work. The notable awards include:

- International Cartographic Association: First world prize for the best photomap of urban area, ICA Conference Ottawa, Ontario, Canada, 1999
- International Cartographic Association: First world prize for the best orientation map (map of the Upper Town of Zagreb), ICA Conference Beijing, China, 2001
- Croatian Chamber of Economy awarded Geofoto with the certificate "Zlatna Kuna", the award for the most successful middle-sized Croatian company
