= Fine'sa Grupa =

FINE´SA GRUPA
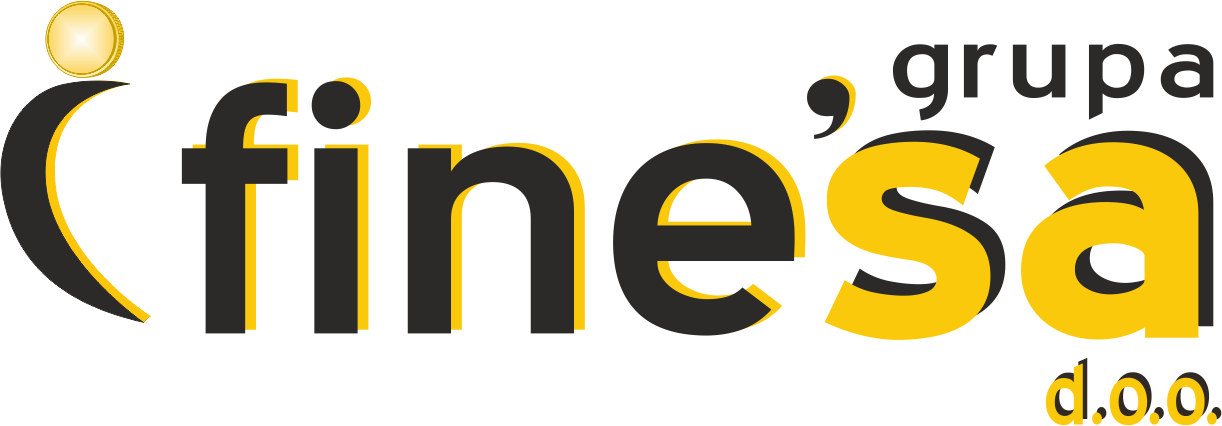
- Type: Limited company
- Industry: Finance
- Founded: 2012.
- Headquarters: Varaždin, Croatia
- Number of locations: Croatia
- Area served: Croatia
- Key people: Josip Samaržija; Founder Libor Weiser; CEO
- Products: Banking, financial and related services
- Revenue: 137 million HRK (2015)
- Net income: 12 million HRK (2015)
- Total assets: 298,5 million HRK (2015)
- Owner: Josip Samaržija
- Number of employees: 301 (2015)
- Website: finesa-grupa.hr

Fine’sa Grupa Ltd. is a company for finance management, investment, real estate and ecoenergy. Other operations also include structuring investments for maintenance and increase of project's value. The company’s headquarters is in Varaždin, Croatia but there are also two remote companies in Donje Ladanje (Fine'sa Consors) and Zadar (Fine'sa Cordis).

== History ==
Chronology of completed projects:

- 1975. – Ivančica Plc., footwear factory, Ivanec
- 1988. – Mipcro Ltd., construction, Ivanec
- 1991. – Savings and credit cooperatives Mipcro, Ivanec
- 1995. – Consors Ltd., footwear, Donje Ladanje
- 1997. – Savings and credit cooperatives Kovanica, Varaždin
- 1998. – Kajzerica Ltd., bakery, Ivanec
- 2002. – Banka Kovanica Plc., finance, Varaždin

Chronology of current projects:

- 2006. – Fine’sa Cordis Ltd., fishing, Zadar
- 2007. – Fine’sa Conceptus Ltd., investments, Varaždin
- 2007. – Fine’sa Credos Plc., finance, Varaždin
- 2010. – Conceptus Publica Ltd., publishing, Varaždin
- 2011. – Conceptus Electrica Ltd., energy, Varaždin
- 2012. – Fine’sa Grupa Ltd., consulting, Varaždin
- 2014. – Fine’sa Confidus Ltd., factoring, Varaždin

== Fine'sa Grupa today ==
Fine’sa Grupa Ltd. includes the following companies:

- Fine’sa Credos Plc., financial company
- Fine’sa Conceptus Ltd., investment company
  - Conceptus Publica Ltd. - Media
  - Conceptus Electrica Ltd - Ecoenergy
- Fine’sa Cordis Ltd., fishing company
- Fine’sa Consors Ltd., footwear company

=== Fine’sa Credos Plc., financial company ===
Fine´sa Credos Plc. is a finance company of development, project management of savings and commercial financing.

=== Fine’sa Conceptus Ltd., investment company ===
Fine´sa Conceptus is an investment company for investment, development and management of investment and property projects and ecoenergy. This is a minor partner investments in proven and know projects, which typically sell their products and services to the operated state companies, national companies, public sector or companies with market image and financial rating, or appropriate guarantees.

=== Fine’sa Cordis Ltd., fishing company ===
Fine´sa Cordis is a fishing company of development and business management of the catch, processing and trade in fish. The company was founded in 2006. under the name Dalmacija ribolov d.o.o., to catch pelagic fish with a fleet of three ships. Today the company operates in the system Fine´sa Grupa with a capital of 22.058.593 kunas, 30 employees in the catch and up to 60 in processing management with a defined development strategy in period from 2016. to 2018. in terms of the partnership to increase the fishing fleet.

=== Fine’sa Consors Ltd., footwear company ===
Fine´sa Consors is a footwear company of development and business management of production and trade of footwear, employs 250 people (not counting employees in corporation), with annual production of 300,000 pairs of high-quality waterproof footwear, specially made for mountaineering, trekking and leisure. The company was founded in 1995 and is headquartered in Donje Ladanje, Croatia.
