= Varaždin Stock Exchange =

The Varaždin Stock Exchange or VSE (Croatian: Varaždinska burza) was a stock exchange which operated in Varaždin, Croatia. It was established in 1993 as an OTC market, and became a stock exchange in 2002. According to January 2007 issue of Investitor, its market capitalization at the beginning of 2007 amounted to 9.8 billion euro. The VSE was merged into the Zagreb Stock Exchange in March 2007.
