= IN2 =

IN2 Ltd
- Company type: Public
- Industry: Software & Programming
- Founded: July 2, 1992
- Headquarters: Zagreb, Croatia
- Key people: Ante Mandić (CEO)
- Revenue: HRK 154.8 million (2016)
- Number of employees: IN2 d.o.o: 350 (as of January 2016); IN2 Group: 550 (as of January 2016)
- Website: www.in2.eu

IN2 is a privately owned company established in 1992, that designs and develops information systems based on advanced information technologies. As of 2013, it was the largest Croatian IT company. The IN2 Group consists of 14 member companies in Croatia, Slovenia, Bosnia and Herzegovina, Serbia, Macedonia and Albania.

IN2 specializes in developing custom software solutions, and developing and implementing large and complex IT systems. IN2 independently designs, develops, implements and maintains systems using Oracle and Microsoft technologies. The company implements technologies such as Data Warehouse, web-based application systems, etc.

In January 2018, IN2 was acquired by Constellation Software, a Canadian software company.
