= Narodni trgovački lanac =

Narodni trgovački lanac (NTL) is a Croatian retail trading chain founded in 2008. During 2025, the company had 1,519 employees, 339 shops and revenue of 254.53 million euros. In addition to its own outlets, NTL today also operates as an association of regional retail chains encompassing the following companies:

- Bakmaz d..o.o (Zadar)
- Boso d.o.o. (Vinkovci)
- Gavranović d.o.o.(Zagreb)
- Trgovina Krk d.d. (Malinska)

== History ==
The first initiative to launch the project known as Narodni trgovački lanac began as early as 2004, but NTL in its current form was formally established in November 2008 and began operations on 1 January 2009. It was formed through a major strategic merger of the then-alliance CBA Internacional (which brought together regional retailers such as Bakmaz, Boso, Studenac and others) with the trading houses Kerum, Tommy, and Dinova-Diona. This merger created what was at the time the largest domestic retail alliance, with over a thousand outlets. The biggest advocate and driving force behind this unification was Željko Kerum, the owner of the then-chain Kerum, who argued that joint purchasing and combined volume was the only way for domestic regional retailers to counter the dominance of the leading chain Konzum and the growing pressure of foreign retail chains on the Croatian market. Over the years, the structure of the alliance changed as major chains such as Tommy and Kerum departed, after which NTL transformed into a standalone company with its own stores that continues to maintain a partnership association with the remaining regional members.
