= Čakovečki mlinovi =

Čakovečki mlinovi d.d.

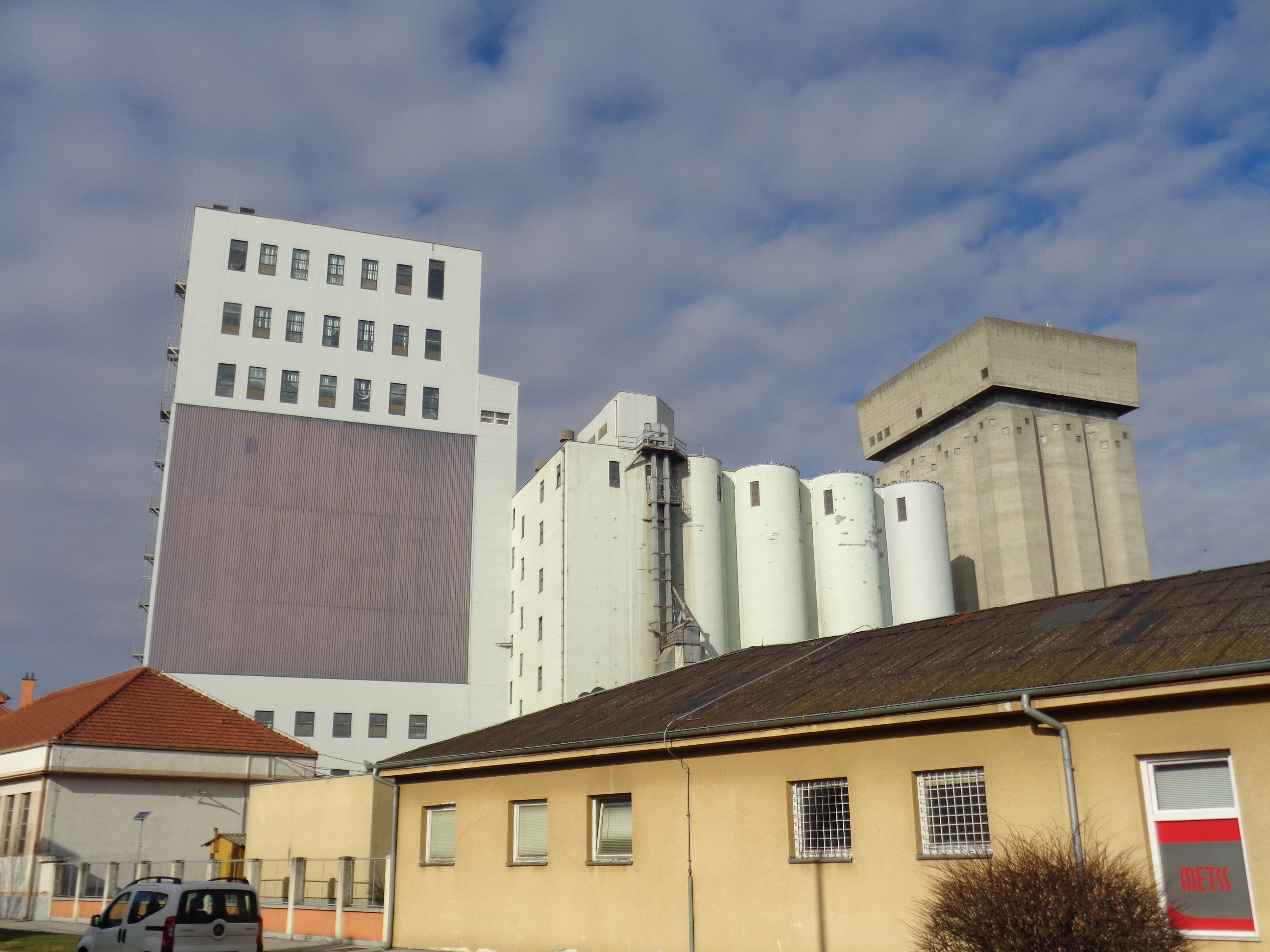
- Type: Public company
- Traded as: ZSE: CKML
- Industry: Food products
- Founded: 1893
- Headquarters: Čakovec, Croatia
- Key people: Stjepan Varga (CEO)
- Products: Wheat flour, pumpkin seed oil, baked goods
- Net income: HRK 144 million (2009) ▼26.9% from 2008
- Number of employees: 1,027 (2006)
- Website: www.cak-mlinovi.hr

Čakovečki mlinovi (lit. "Čakovec Mills") is a Croatian milling company based in Čakovec. In addition to being the biggest producer of wheat flour in the country, it also produces baked goods and pumpkin seed oil. The company's shares are listed on the Zagreb Stock Exchange (ZSE) and is one of the 25 companies included in its official share index CROBEX as of September 2010.

The company's main plants are located in Čakovec, Donji Kraljevec, Oroslavje and Konjščina, all located in the north of the country, and its main wheat suppliers are farmers from the Međimurje County region. The company mills some 50,000 tons of wheat annually, which makes it the biggest company of its kind in Croatia, while the company's bakeries produce some 10,000 tons of baked goods every year. In 1999 the company acquired Trgovina Krk, a small retail chain based on the island of Krk, and in 2003 the company established METSS, a subsidiary which operates some 90 food and retail stores in Međimurje.

The company's CEO Stjepan Varga and his wife Ružica are the company's biggest shareholders, owning some 26 percent of shares combined. In 2009 the company posted a profit of HRK 24 million, which is expected to increase to 28 million in 2010.
