= Adris Grupa =

Croatian diversified conglomerate

Adris Grupa d.d.

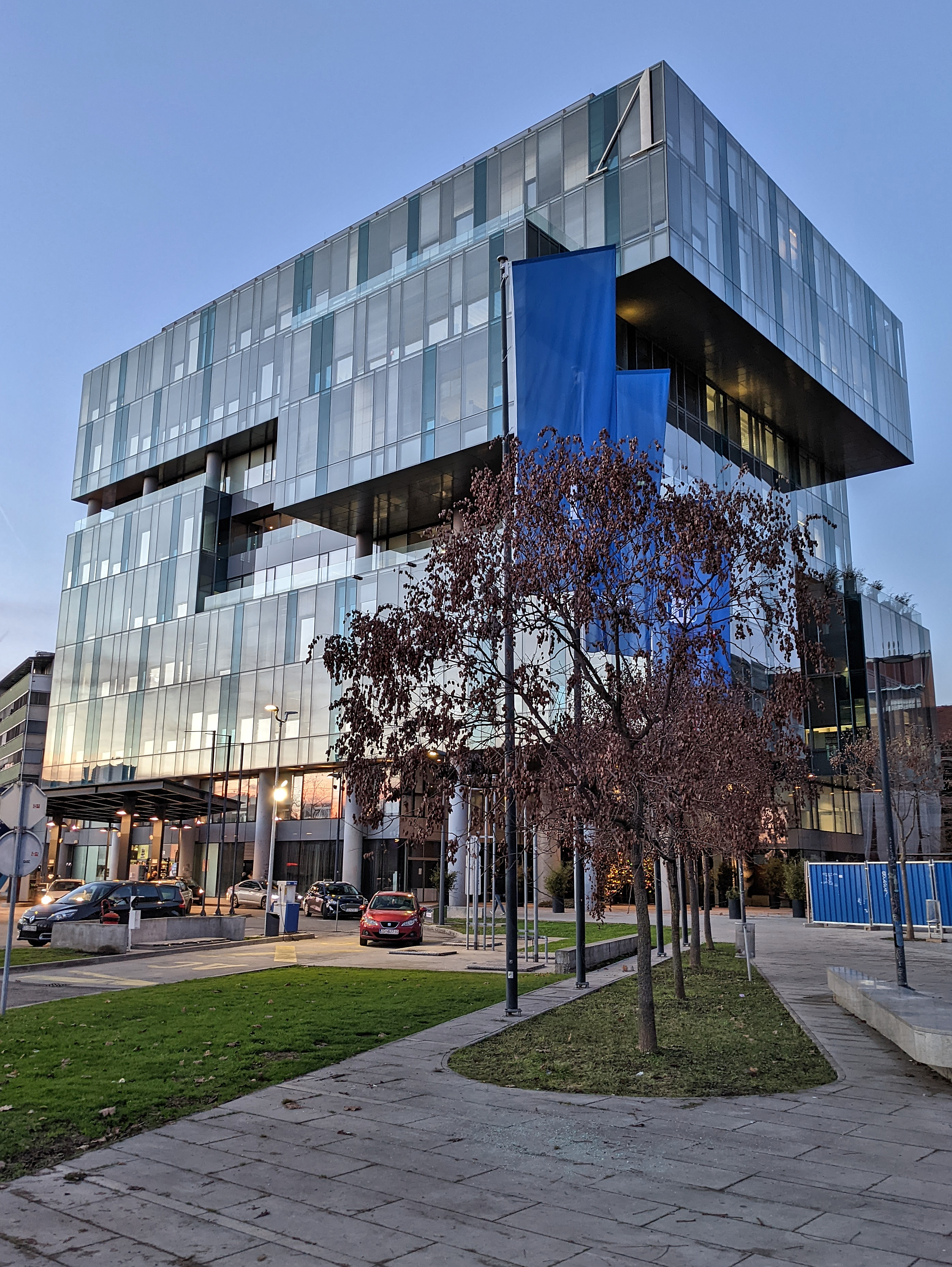
- Adris grupa building in Zagreb
- Type: Public
- Traded as: ZSE: ADRS
- Industry: Insurance, Tourism, Seafood, Real Estate
- Founded: 2003 (Privatised and founded as Adris grupa), 1872 (Tobacco Factory Rovinj established)
- Headquarters: Rovinj, Croatia
- Key people: Marko Remenar (assumed position Jan. 1st 2020) (CEO)
- Revenue: ▲EUR 1.2 billion (2025)
- Net income: ▲EUR 105 million (2025)
- Total assets: ▲EUR 1.3 billion (2024)
- Number of employees: 8,336 (2024)
- Website: www.adris.hr

Adris Grupa d.d. is a Croatian diversified conglomerate based in Rovinj. It has more than 8,000 employees, and is one of the leading companies in the region, with an annual income of more than 5 billion kunas (around 1 bln dollars).

Since the sale of Tvornica duhana Rovinj (TDR) to British American Tobacco in September 2015, its core businesses are Maistra (tourism and hotels), Cromaris (food industry), and Croatia osiguranje (insurance). It also operates a public internship and employment program called "The Future in Adris" and The Adris Foundation, which awards scholarships and donations.

It's being traded on the Zagreb Stock Exchange (ZSE) with a ticker symbol "ADRS". In June 2022, Adris announced a one-year share buyback programme.
