= Zagreb Stock Exchange =

Stock exchange in Zagreb, Croatia

- Zagrebačka burza

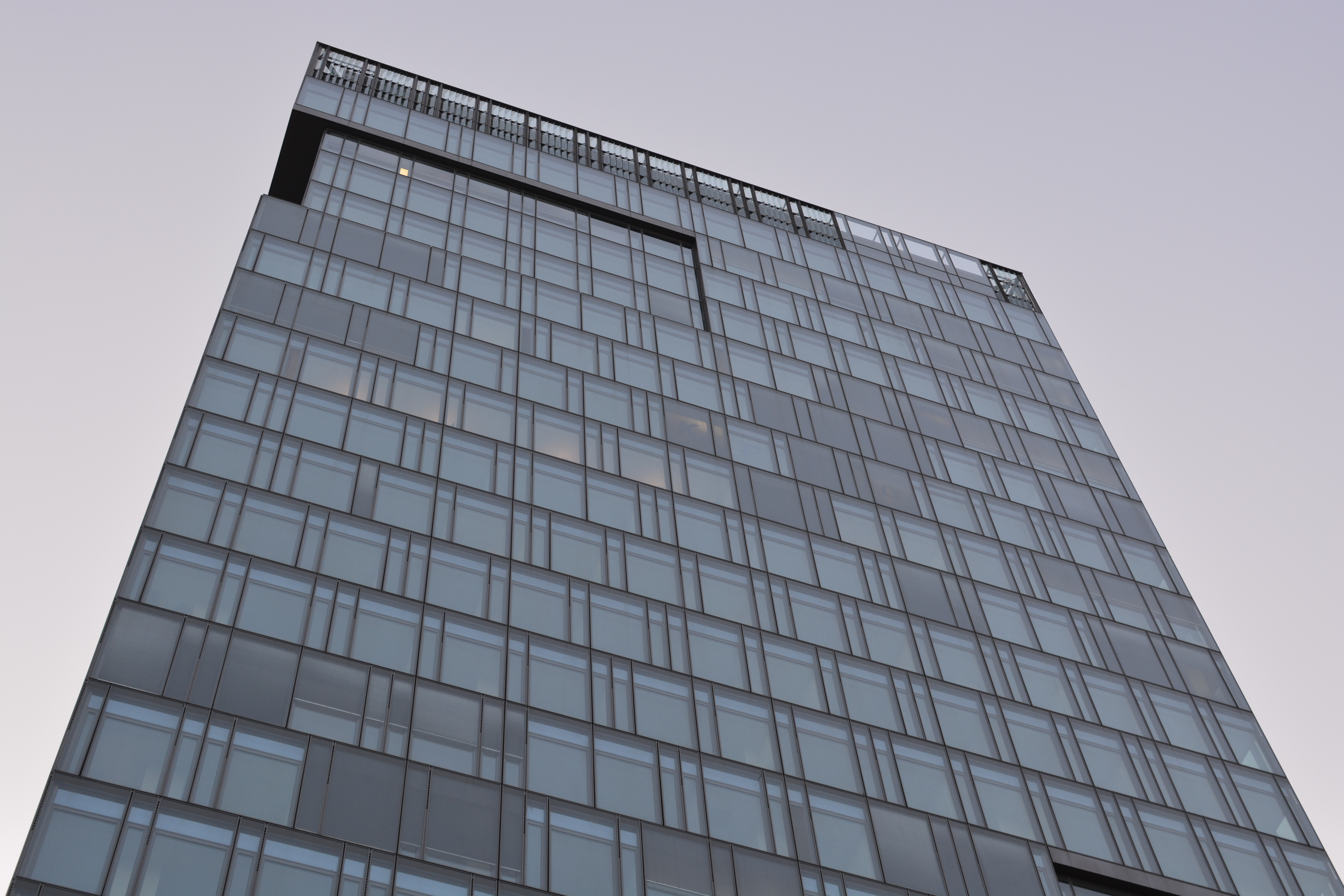
- Headquarters in Eurotower
- Type: Stock exchange
- Location: Zagreb, Croatia
- Founded: 1907 (original); 1991 (reopened)
- Owner: Zagrebačka burza d.d.
- Key people: Ivana Gažić (CEO)
- Currency: EUR
- No. of listings: 118 (Dec 2025)
- Market cap: €55.4 billion (31 Dec 2025)
- Volume: €865.84 million (2025)
- Indices: CROBEX, CROBIS
- Website: zse.hr/en

The Zagreb Stock Exchange or ZSE (Croatian: Zagrebačka burza, pronounced [zǎːɡrebatʃkaː bûrza]) is a stock exchange located in Zagreb, Croatia. It is Croatia's only stock exchange. The exchange trades shares of Croatian companies, as well as bonds and commercial bills.

== Background ==
The "Zagreb Stock Exchange for the goods and values" was co-founded by the Department of Goods and Values of the Association of Industrialists and Traders of Croatia and Slavonia under Milivoj Crnadak and Samuel David Alexander in 1907, as an attempt to claim more independence from the authorities in Budapest, beyond the Croatian-Hungarian Settlement. It operated until 1911, when it was shut down by the Croat-Serb Coalition which instead wanted to promote the use of the exchange in Belgrade. It was secretly restarted in 1917 during World War I, and formally reopened in 1919 in Yugoslavia. In 1945, after World War II, the stock exchange stopped operating. In 1946, the stock exchange formally ceased to exist as it was confiscated by the new communist authorities of Yugoslavia.

== History ==
The ZSE was established between 1989 and 1991 at the initiative of the banks of the then-SR Croatia and Zajednica osiguranja osoba i imovine Croatia. It listed the first securities in 1992. It also supported the process of privatization in Croatia. In 1994, it deployed its first electronic distributed trading system. In 1995, it deployed its first website with the help of CARNET.

A separate exchange in Varaždin was founded in 1993. In March 2007 the Varaždin Stock Exchange (VSE) was incorporated into the ZSE, forming a single Croatian capital market, leading in the region by market capitalization and trading volume. As of 31 December 2016, ZSE's total market capitalization was 232.4 billion kn (€30.8 billion).

In 2015, the Zagreb Stock Exchange purchased the Ljubljana Stock Exchange (Ljubljanska borza) from the Wiener Börse. In 2020, the exchange acquired a 5.3% ownership stake of the Macedonian Stock Exchange (MSE) and further raised its stake in the Macedonian Stock Exchange up to 29.98% in August 2022.

In November 2024, the European Bank for Reconstruction and Development (EBRD) and the stock exchanges from eight Central and Eastern Europe countries (Bratislava Stock Exchange, Budapest Stock Exchange, Bucharest Stock Exchange, Bulgarian Stock Exchange, Ljubljana Stock Exchange, Warsaw Stock Exchange and Zagreb Stock Exchange) signed a Memorandum of Understanding for deepening their cooperation, in order to strengthen liquidity and attract investors. Building upon this agreement, the Finance ministers of the eight countries (Bulgaria, Croatia, Hungary, North Macedonia, Poland, Romania, Slovakia and Slovenia) signed in August 2025 a Memorandum of Understanding for formalizing their cooperation in order to foster the common development of their capital markets, through regulatory alignment and increased market integration.

== Operations ==
The exchange has pre-market sessions from 09:00 to 10:00 and normal trading sessions from 10:00 to 16:00 on all days of the week except Saturdays, Sundays and holidays declared by the exchange in advance.

The Zagreb Stock Exchange is located in the skyscraper Eurotower at the intersection of Vukovarska and Lučićeva street.

The Zagreb Stock Exchange is a member of the Federation of Euro-Asian Stock Exchanges.

The Zagreb Stock Exchange publishes the following indices:

- CROBEX, stocks
- CROBIS, bonds

== CROBIS ==
CROBIS is the official Zagreb Stock Exchange bond index. The index currently tracks ten bulleted bonds with fixed interest rates, each worth a minimum nominal value of €75 million and with a maturity rate of at least 18 months. Revisions to the index are carried out four times a year.

== Index Trackers and International Connectivity ==
Passive exposure for international investors to the CROBEX index is possible through an exchange-traded fund - Expat Croatia CROBEX UCITS ETF - listed in Frankfurt on Xetra (ticker ECDC, ISIN: BGCROEX03189) and traded in euro. The fund acts as a conduit for capital flows between the international financial markets and the Croatian capital market.
