= Incel (company) =

Paper company in Bosnia and Herzegovina

Coordinates: 44°46′28″N 17°13′35″E

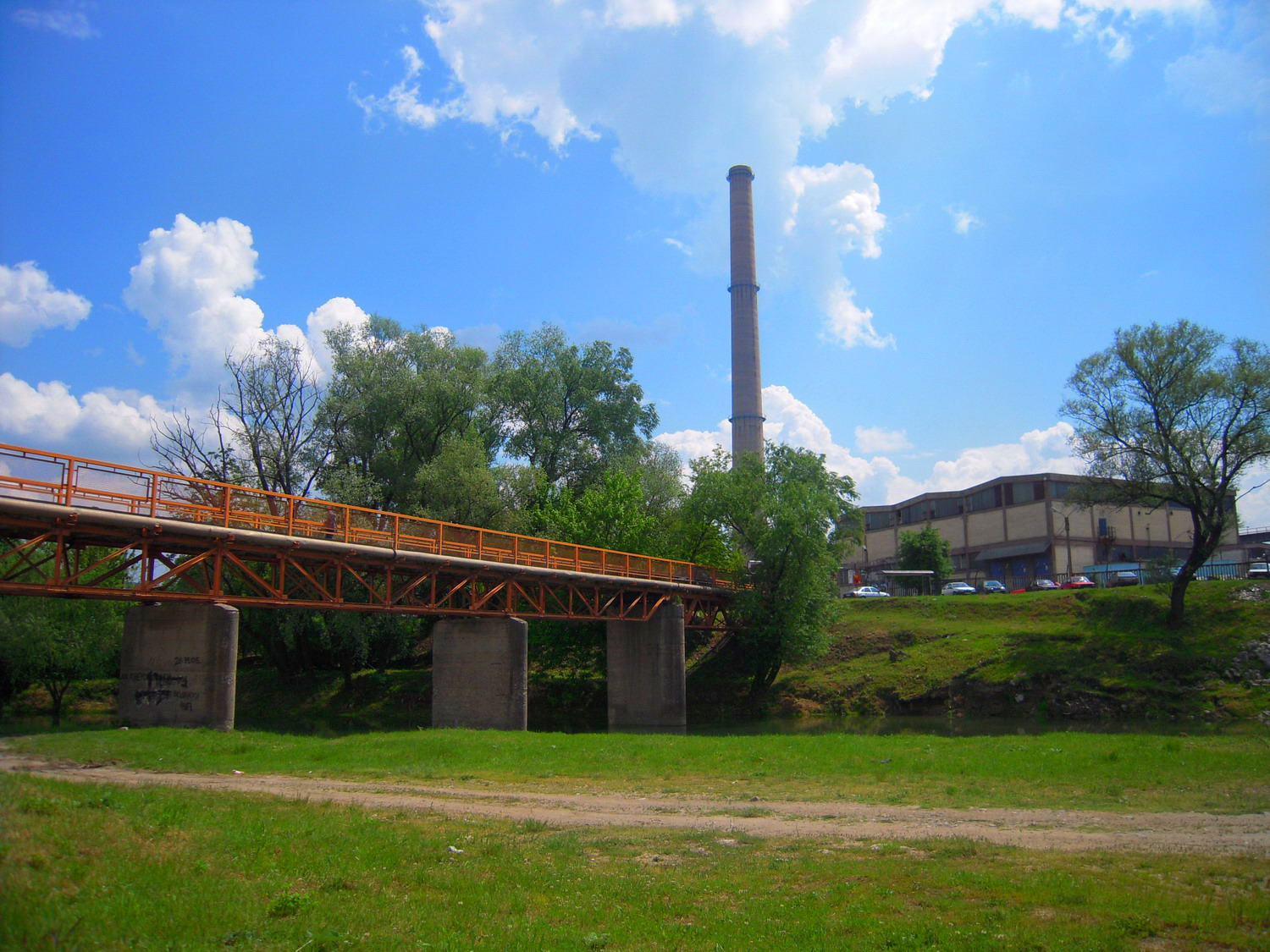
- Incel chimney
- Native name: Инцел, Incel
- Headquarters: Banja Luka, Bosnia and Herzegovina

Incel (Serbian Cyrillic: Инцел) was a company based in Banja Luka, Bosnia and Herzegovina, originally manufacturing cellulose, viscose and paper products. Established in 1954, it was a major industrial conglomerate in the field during the socialist era, employing up to 6,500 workers. Following a period of decline in the 1980s and the Bosnian War in the 1990s, the factory shut down, and was subsequently split into several smaller enterprises. Parts of the original Incel industrial zone, largely decrepit, now serve as a business zone rented to small companies. The 150-meters-tall chimney of its former coal-powered plant is one of the tallest structures in Bosnia and Herzegovina.

== History ==
Banja Luka's cellulose industry was established in 1954, and the first production plants were built between 1955 and 1957. Between 1970 and 1981, multiple new production lines were built as part of the industrial conglomerate (SOUR) "Incel". At its peak, it employed 6,500 workers. The conglomerate included units such as "Celuloza", "Viskoza", "Elektroliza", "Energetika", "Industrijske plantaže" along with others, achieving total exports of over 100 million dollars. Incel had joint ventures with Šipad, Krivaja, and other major Bosnian companies.

During its early chronology, it ordered a polyester filament plant, and subsequently ordered a polyester fibre plant from Uhde.

The Bosnian War marked the demise of the factory, and one plant after another ceased production due to loss of market and working capital. After the war, there have been several attempts to restart the business, but the basic production has never been renewed. Through the process of restructuring and privatization, Incel was split into 10 companies, and never recovered. The tissue paper brand Celex remains the only successful section of the former complex, as it was sold to a Slovakia-based group, and is still available on the markets of former Yugoslavia. The industrial zone was turned into a "business zone" and was opened to leasing, with about 60 small companies using the space, mostly as warehouses, employing around 1,500 workers.

The area is largely decrepit and described as "Banja Luka's Fukushima" by some. In 2019, the United Nations Development Programme inquired on management for the contaminated sites of the facility. After soil remediation expert Boudewijn Fokke (from the Dutch company TAUW) conducted a field study with soil samples, the research suggested issues were manageable and not to raise alarm over.

== See also ==
- List of companies of the Socialist Federal Republic of Yugoslavia
- Rudi Čajavec (company)
