= List of companies of the Socialist Federal Republic of Yugoslavia =

Map of Europe in 1989, showing Yugoslavia highlighted in green

This list comprises notable companies that participated in the economy of the Socialist Federal Republic of Yugoslavia, a country which lasted from 29 November 1945 to 27 April 1992. They were mostly organized in the form of an associated labour organisation (OUR).

Those companies that were named using generic elements in a descriptive formula such as city – product/branch – "Factory" (or similar) have had their names translated. They were commonly referred to by their initials, which are kept in their original form.

== Automotive industry ==
Name	Headquarters	Republic/province	Established in	Operations/products
IDA-Opel	Kikinda	SR Serbia (SAP Vojvodina)	1977	cars; 49% owned by General Motors
Zavodi Crvena Zastava	Kragujevac	SR Serbia	1904	Fiat cars and trucks
Ikarus	Zemun	SR Serbia	1923	buses
Neobus	Novi Sad	SR Serbia (SAP Vojvodina)	1952	buses
Maribor Automobile and Engine Factory (TAM)	Maribor	SR Slovenia	1946	trucks
Cimos	Koper	SR Slovenia	1972	cars; half owned by Citroën
Sežana Motorcycle Factory (TOMOS)	Koper	SR Slovenia	1954	motorcycles and cars
Sarajevo Car Factory (TAS)	Sarajevo	SR Bosnia and Herzegovina	1969	VW cars
Zagreb Bus Factory (TAZ)	Zagreb	SR Croatia	1930	buses
Priboj Car Factory (FAP)	Priboj	SR Serbia	1953	trucks and buses
FAS 11 Oktomvri (FAS Sanos)	Skopje	SR Macedonia	1946	buses
Industrija Motornih Vozil	Novo Mesto	Socialist Republic of Slovenia	1954	cars, caravans

== Shipbuilding ==
Name	Headquarters	Republic/province	Established in	Operations/products
Shipyard Tito	Belgrade	SR Serbia	1895	construction and repair of ships
3. May	Rijeka	SR Croatia	1948	construction and repair of ships
Uljanik	Pula	SR Croatia	1856	construction and repair of ships
Viktor Lenac Shipyard	Rijeka	SR Croatia	1896	construction and repair of ships
Brodosplit	Split	SR Croatia	1931	construction and repair of ships
Tito's Shipyard	Kraljevica	SR Croatia	1729	construction and repair of ships

== Military industry ==
Name	Headquarters	Republic/province	Established in	Operations/products
Krušik	Valjevo	SR Serbia	1939	ammunition, weapons, mining tools, shovels
Prvi Partizan	Užice	SR Serbia	1927	ammunition
Trayal	Kruševac	SR Serbia	1889	commercial explosives and pyrotechnics
SOKO	Mostar	SR Bosnia and Herzegovina	1950	fighter planes
PPT-Petoletka	Trstenik	SR Serbia	1949	aviation, hydraulics, pneumatics
Utva Aviation Industry (UTVA)	Pančevo	SR Serbia	1937	piston engine aircraft and gliders
Yugoimport SDPR	Belgrade	SR Serbia	1949	import and export, and production of weapons
Zastava Arms	Kragujevac	SR Serbia	1853	civil and military program, artillery

== Wood and paper industry ==
Name	Headquarters	Republic/province	Established in	Operations/products
SIMPO	Vranje	SR Serbia	1963	production of furniture
Sloveniales	Ljubljana	SR Slovenia		production of wooden furniture
ŠIPAD	Sarajevo	SR Bosnia and Herzegovina	1892	production of wooden furniture
Incel	Banja Luka	SR Bosnia and Herzegovina	1954	production of cellulose, viscose and paper

== Construction ==
Name	Headquarters	Republic/province	Established in	Operations/products
Energoinvest	Sarajevo	SR Bosnia and Herzegovina	1951	construction company
Energoprojekt	Belgrade	SR Serbia	1951	design company
Građevni kombinat 'Međimurje'	Čakovec	SR Croatia	1963	construction and civil engineering company

== Electronics ==
Name	Headquarters	Republic/province	Established in	Operations/products
Digitron	Buje	SR Croatia	1971	electronic devices
Zagreb Radio Industry (RIZ)	Zagreb	SR Croatia	1948	electronic devices, transmitters, gramophones, computers
Niš Electronic Industry (Ei)	Niš	SR Serbia	1948	television sets, gramophones, computers, measuring instruments
Rudi Čajavec	Banja Luka	SR Bosnia and Herzegovina	1950	transistor radios, television sets, car equipment, military electronics and integrated systems
Elektrotehna / Iskra Delta	Ljubljana	SR Slovenia	1974	computers, affiliated with DEC

== Machine industry ==
Name	Headquarters	Republic/province	Established in	Operations/products
14. oktobar	Kruševac	SR Serbia	1923	heavy machinery and equipment
Đuro Đaković	Slavonski Brod	SR Croatia	1921	locomotives, machines, agricultural machines, devices
Gorenje	Velenje	SR Slovenia	1950	white goods, home appliances
Goša	Smederevska Palanka	SR Serbia	1923	passenger and freight wagons
Iskra	Ljubljana	SR Slovenia	1946	white goods, electrical and electronic devices
Industry of Machinery and Tractors	Belgrade	SR Serbia	1947	tractors and attached agricultural machines
Jelšingrad	Banja Luka	SR Bosnia and Herzegovina		machine tools
Končar	Zagreb	SR Croatia	1921	generators, motors, household appliances, metal structures
Litostroj	Ljubljana	SR Slovenia		heavy machinery
Metalac	Gornji Milanovac	SR Serbia	1959	production of enamelware
Niš Machine Industry (MIN)	Niš	SR Serbia	1884	heavy machinery, locomotives, wagons, railway infrastructure, special vehicles
Prvomajska	Zagreb	SR Croatia	-	tool machinery
Rakovica Motor Industry (IMR)	Rakovica	SR Serbia	1927	tractors, diesel engines
Riko	Ribnica	SR Slovenia		agricultural machines and tools, road maintenance machinery
Tvornica željezničkih vozila Gredelj (TŽV Gredelj)	Zagreb	SR Croatia	1894	locomotives, wagons
Tomo Vinković	Bjelovar	SR Croatia	1953	tractors and attached agricultural machines
UNIS	Sarajevo	SR Bosnia and Herzegovina	1968	metal equipment, bearings and parts
Zmaj	Zemun	SR Serbia	1927	combine harvesters and attached agricultural machines

== Petroleum industry ==
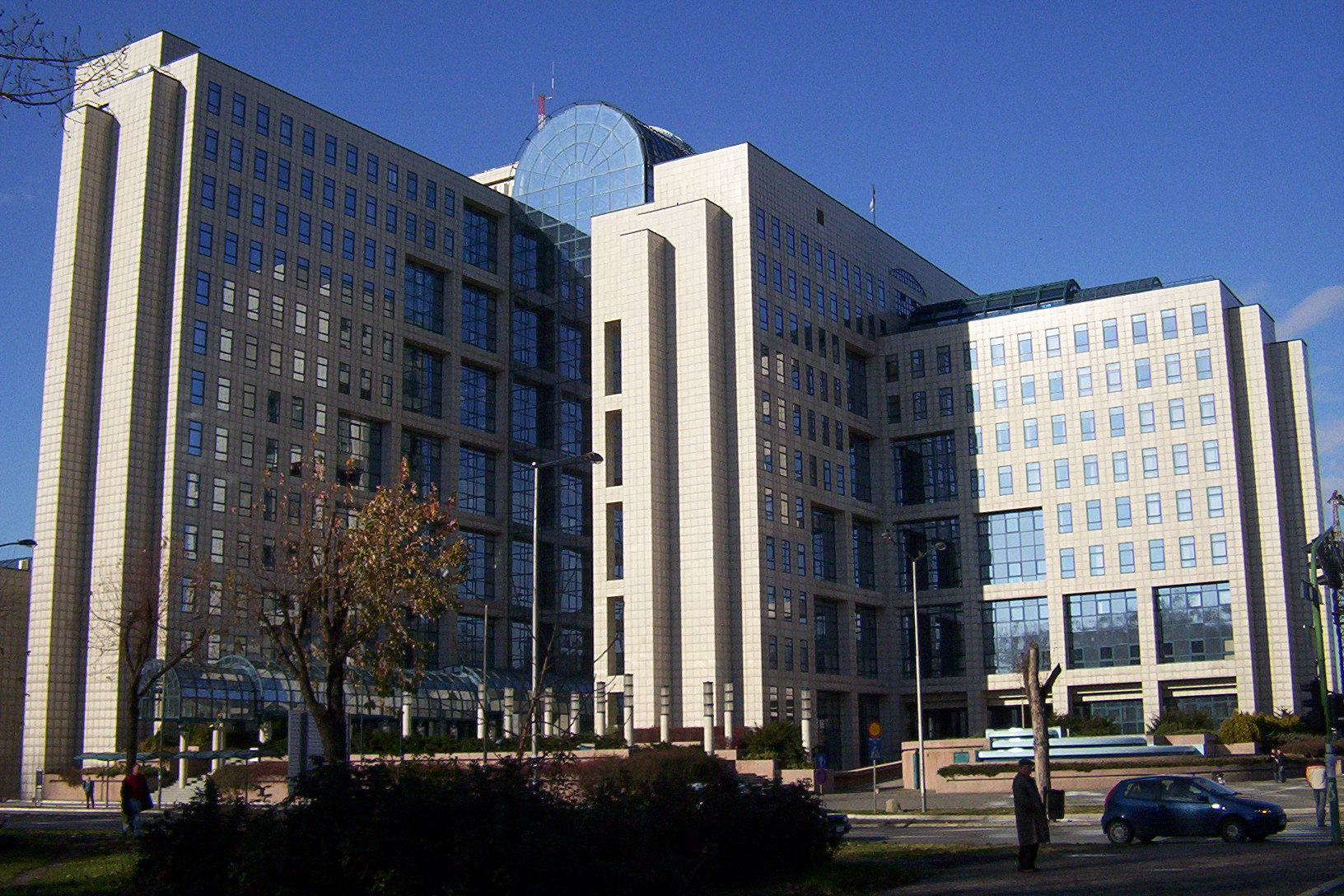
Energoprojekt designed the headquarters of Naftagas; it was completed in 1998, at which time Naftagas had been renamed to Petroleum Industry of Serbia (NIS), so the building is known as the NIS building.

Name	Headquarters	Republic/province	Established in
INA	Zagreb	SR Croatia	1964
Jugopetrol	Kotor	SR Montenegro	1947
Naftagas	Novi Sad	SR Serbia (SAP Vojvodina)	1945

== Food, tobacco and agricultural industry ==
Name	Headquarters	Republic/province	Established in	Operations/products
Agrokomerc	Velika Kladuša	SR Bosnia and Herzegovina	1969	food products
Bambi	Požarevac	SR Serbia	1967	confectionery and food products
Badel	Zagreb	SR Croatia	1862	alcoholic beverages
Belgrade Agricultural Combine (PKB)	Belgrade	SR Serbia	1945	agribusiness; its notable departments were Imlek (1953; dairy) and Frikom (1975; ice cream and frozen food)
Cedevita	Zagreb	SR Croatia	1929	non-alcoholic beverages
Centroproizvod	Belgrade	SR Serbia	1976	coffee and food products
Vindija	Varaždin	SR Croatia	1959	non-alcoholic beverages
Gavrilović	Petrinja	SR Croatia	1690	meat products
Dijamant	Zrenjanin	SR Serbia (SAP Vojvodina)	1938	production of oil, margarine, mayonnaise and delicacies
Franck	Zagreb	SR Croatia	1892	food products
Niš Tobacco Industry (DIN)	Niš	SR Serbia	1930	tobacco products
Zvečevo	Zvečevo	SR Croatia	1921	various food products
Jaffa	Crvenka	SR Serbia (SAP Vojvodina)	1975	biscuits
Kraš	Zagreb	SR Croatia	1911	chocolates and candies
Kandit	Osijek	SR Croatia	1920	chocolates and candies
Koestlin	Bjelovar	SR Croatia	1905	chocolates and candies
Knjaz Miloš	Arandjelovac	SR Serbia	1811	mineral water and soft drinks
Ledo	Zagreb	SR Croatia	1958	frozen products
Maraska	Zadar	SR Croatia	1768	liqueurs, alcoholic and non-alcoholic drinks
PIK Takovo	Gornji Milanovac	SR Serbia	1959	confectionery products (notably, Eurokrem)
Plantaže 13. jul	Podgorica	SR Montenegro	1963	wine and wine products
Podravka	Koprivnica	SR Croatia	1934	food products
Radenska	Radenci	SR Slovenia		mineral water and soft drinks
Rubin	Kruševac	SR Serbia	1955	alcoholic and non-alcoholic drinks
Sojaprotein	Bečej	SR Serbia (SAP Vojvodina)	1977	soy processing
Štark	Belgrade	SR Serbia	1922	chocolates and candies
Rovinj Tobacco Factory (TDR)	Rovinj	SR Croatia	1872	tobacco products
Trebješa Brewery	Nikšić	SR Montenegro	1896	alcoholic and non-alcoholic drinks
Viro	Virovitica	SR Croatia	1982	sugar production
Zvijezda	Zagreb	SR Croatia	1916	production of oil, margarine, mayonnaise, ketchup and delicacies

== Transportation ==
Name	Headquarters	Republic/province	Established in	Operations
Aviogenex (division of Generalexport)	Belgrade	SR Serbia	1968	air transport
Adria Airways	Ljubljana	SR Slovenia	1961	air transport
Air Yugoslavia	Belgrade	SR Serbia	1969	air transport
Jugoslovenski aerotransport (JAT)	Belgrade	SR Serbia	1947	air transport
Yugoslav Railways (JŽ)	Belgrade	SR Serbia	1918	railway transport
Lasta	Belgrade	SR Serbia	1947	bus transport
Niš-Ekspres	Niš	SR Serbia	1951	bus transport
Severtrans	Sombor	SR Serbia (SAP Vojvodina)	1947	bus transport

== Textile and footwear industry ==
Name	Headquarters	Republic/province	Established in	Operations
Sintelon	Bačka Palanka	SR Serbia (SAP Vojvodina)	1971	carpet production
Međimurska trikotaža Čakovec (MTČ)	Čakovec	SR Croatia	1923	clothing production
Tekstilni Kombinat Raška	Novi Pazar	SR Serbia	1958	production of various kinds of textile products including carpets, blouses, shirts, jeans and many more
Industrija odeće “Prvi Maj” Pirot	Pirot	SR Serbia	1959	production of various kinds of textile products and clothing like jeans.

== Mines and ironworks ==
Name	Headquarters	Republic/province	Established in
Smederevo Ironworks	Smederevo	SR Serbia	1913
Zenica Ironworks	Zenica	SR Bosnia and Herzegovina	1892
Bor Mine	Bor	SR Serbia	1904
Kolubara Mine	Lazarevac	SR Serbia	1896
Nikšić Bauxite Mines	Nikšić	SR Montenegro	1948
Trepča Mine	Trepča	SAP Kosovo	1925

== Pharmaceutical industry ==
Name	Headquarters	Republic/province	Established in
Alkaloid	Skopje	SR Macedonia	1945
Bosnalijek	Sarajevo	SR Bosnia and Herzegovina	1951
Galenika	Zemun	SR Serbia	1945
Krka	Novo Mesto	SR Slovenia	1954
Lek	Ljubljana	SR Slovenia	1946
Pliva	Zagreb	SR Croatia	1945
Hemofarm	Vršac	SR Serbia (SAP Vojvodina)	1960

== Chemical industry ==
Name	Headquarters	Republic/province	Established in	Operations/products
Fotokemika Zagreb	Samobor / Zagreb	SR Croatia	1947	Production of photographic films and chemicals under license by ADOX (notably Efke)
HIP-Azotara	Pančevo	SR Serbia (SAP Vojvodina)	1975	mineral fertilizer and nitrogen compounds
HIP-Petrohemija	Pančevo	SR Serbia (SAP Vojvodina)	1977	petrochemical products
Tigar	Pirot	SR Serbia	1966	rubber products and rubber footwear
Sava	Kranj	SR Slovenia	1921	various rubber products including tyres, fan- and timing belts

== Retail industry ==
Name	Headquarters	Republic/province	Established in	Operations/products
Jugoexport	Belgrade	SR Serbia	1953	import–export, clothing
Razvitak	Metković	SR Croatia	1947	supermarkets, department stores, hospitality industry

== See also ==
- List of companies of Bosnia and Herzegovina
- List of companies of Croatia
- List of companies of Montenegro
- List of companies of North Macedonia - until 11 February 2019 Macedonia
- List of companies of Serbia
- List of companies of Slovenia
