= Rudi Čajavec (company) =

Defunct Bosnian electromechanical and electronics company

- Founded: 1950; 76 years ago
- Headquarters: Banja Luka, Bosnia and Herzegovina

Rudi Čajavec (successively reincorporated under various names, including SOUR Rudi Čajavec) was a Yugoslav electromechanical and electronics company, based in Banja Luka, Bosnia and Herzegovina. Founded in 1950, the company was named after Rudi Čajavec, the first airman of the Yugoslav Partisan air force and People's Hero of Yugoslavia. It produced a wide range of products for the military and for the civilian market.

== History ==
In 1950, during the first Yugoslav five-year plan, the government of the Federal People's Republic of Yugoslavia decreed the founding of the Fabrika vojne elektronske opreme i uređaja "Rudi Čajavec" (transl. Factory of Military Electronic Equipment and Devices "Rudi Čajavec") in Banja Luka. It was established in the same period as several other medium-to-large state enterprises in the city, which have remained in operation in the 21st century as joint-stock companies, namely: Krajina a.d (construction), Vitaminka a.d. (food), and Autoprevoz a.d. (transport). It was the regional counterpart of other major Yugoslav technological companies of the period, such as Gorenje, Iskra, and Ei Niš.

Originally registered with the Yugoslav People's Army, the factory was reassigned to civil authorities by the Ministry of Defence, and in 1956, the local government, in the form of the People's Committee of Banja Luka (NOO Banja Luka), renamed the enterprise to Fabrika za elektromehaniku i elektroniku "Rudi Čajavec" (transl. Electromechanics and electronics factory Rudi Čajavec). In accordance with the principles of socialist self-management, the enterprise was subsequently reorganised as a self-managed holding entity, or SOUR (složena organizacija udruženog rada; transl. compound organisation of associated labour), comprising multiple OOURs (osnovna organizacija udruženog rada; transl. basic organisation of associated labour).

Čajavec grew rapidly in mid-1960s, when the number of employees was increased by 3,000. Yearly exports in this period were valued at around $30 million. In 1991, the company had around 10,000 employees, including 2,000 engineers. The need for more specialised staff influenced the establishment of The Faculty of Electrical Engineering of the University of Banja Luka. Yearly exports prior to the breakout of the war amounted to around $50 million.

During the systemic reforms of the early 1990s, it remained a non-privatised social enterprise in the form of a holding corporation, and after subsequent reforms following the Yugoslav Wars, it was reverted to a fully state-owned matično državno preduzeće (transl. parent state enterprise), MDP "Čajavec holding". In a controversial process, in 2006 the holding was effectively dismantled by transferring its property to 24 constituent companies—former OOURs—which were privatised, and many of them were subsequently liquidated.

== Products ==
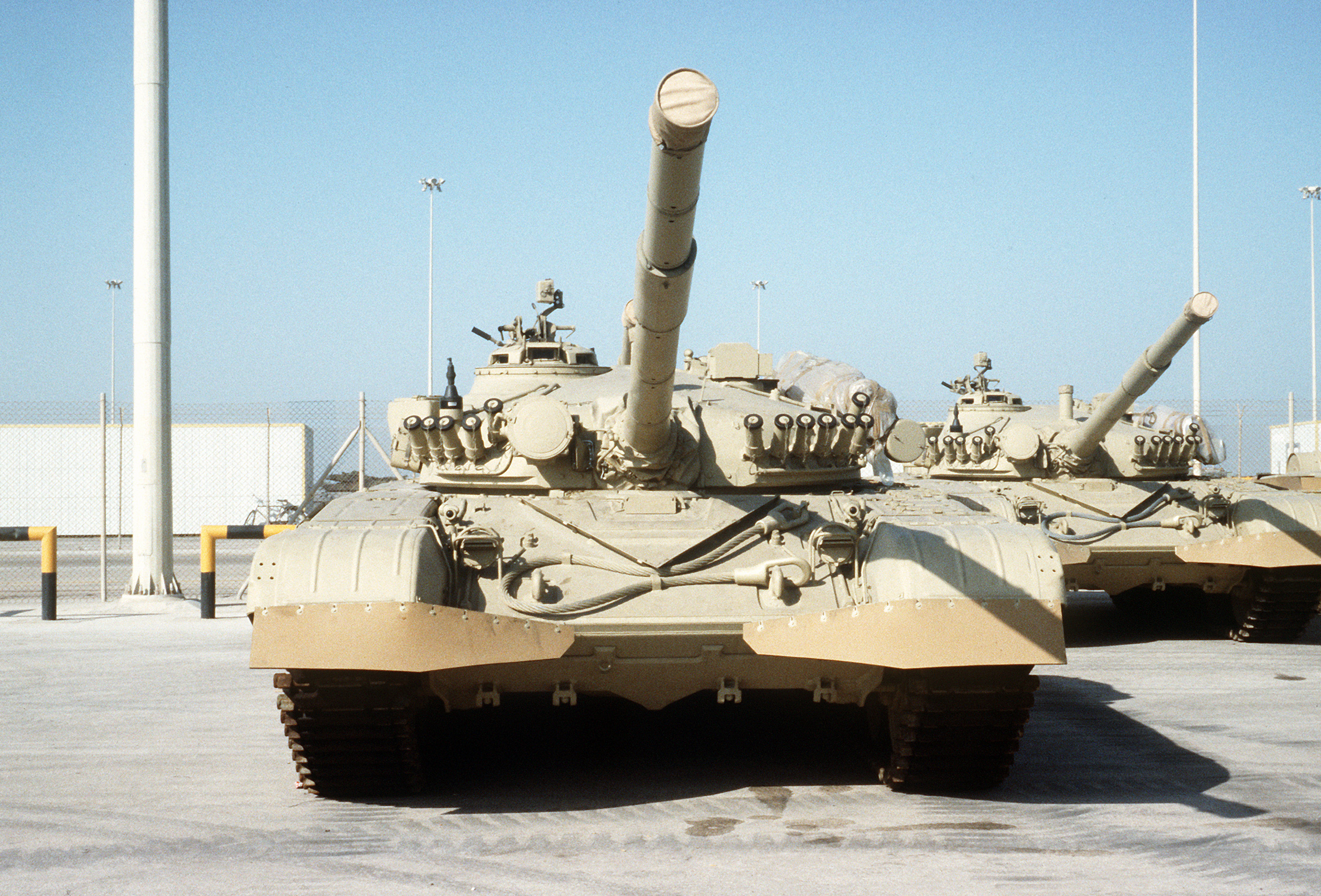
M-84 tanks exported to Kuwait bore equipment produced by Čajavec

Čajavec initially produced electromechanical devices and aviation instruments, such as manometers, which were mainly supplied to the military. This later expanded to various electronic devices for the military, including military communications systems and radars. It contributed various parts and systems (such as the fire-control system) in the manufacture of the M-84 tank. Its other products included television sets (since 1957), transistor radios (since 1961), car equipment, loudspeakers, PA systems, and guitar amplifiers. Regional musicians used the latter as a substitute for Marshall amps, and other comparable Western products.

== See also ==
- List of companies of the Socialist Federal Republic of Yugoslavia
