= Bulevar =

Bulevar Булевар
- Urban neighborhood
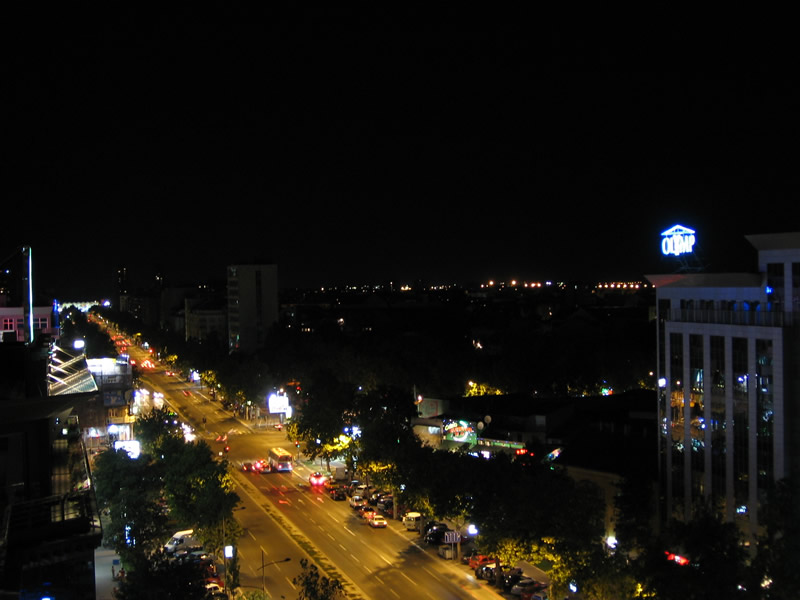
- Liberation Boulevard by night

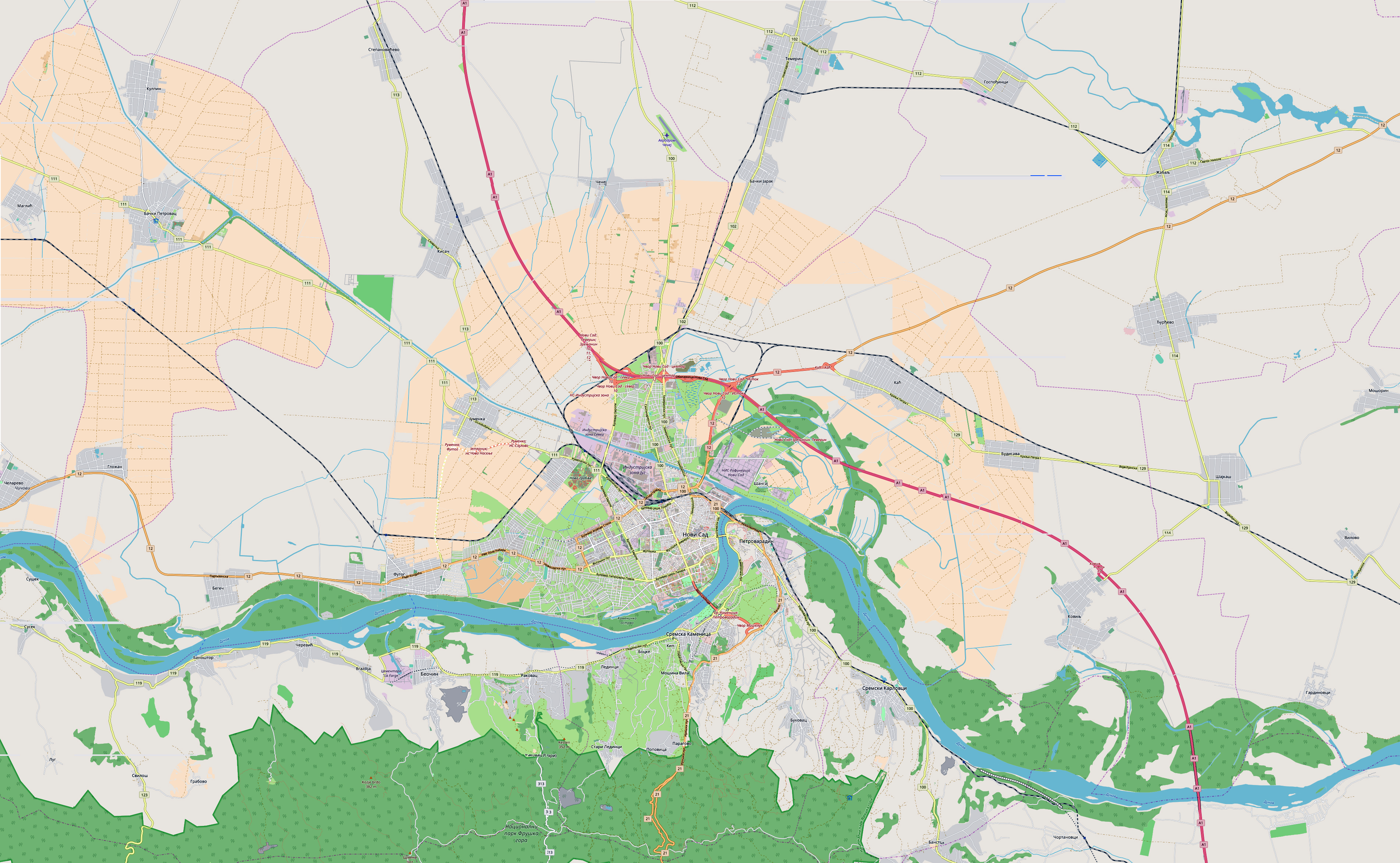
- Location within Novi Sad
- Coordinates: 45.2517°N 19.8350°E
- Country: Serbia
- Province: Vojvodina
- District: South Bačka
- Municipality: Novi Sad
- Time zone: UTC+1 (CET)
  - Summer (DST): UTC+2 (CEST)
- Area code: +381(0)21
- Car plates: NS

Bulevar (Serbian Cyrillic: Булевар; English: Boulevard) is an urban neighborhood of the city of Novi Sad, Serbia. Its name simply means "boulevard" in Serbian. Bulevar is not a traditional city neighborhood; it is rather an informal neighborhood that includes parts of several traditional city quarters that are situated around 3 km long Liberation Boulevard (Serbian: Bulevar oslobođenja), the main street in Novi Sad.

== Location ==
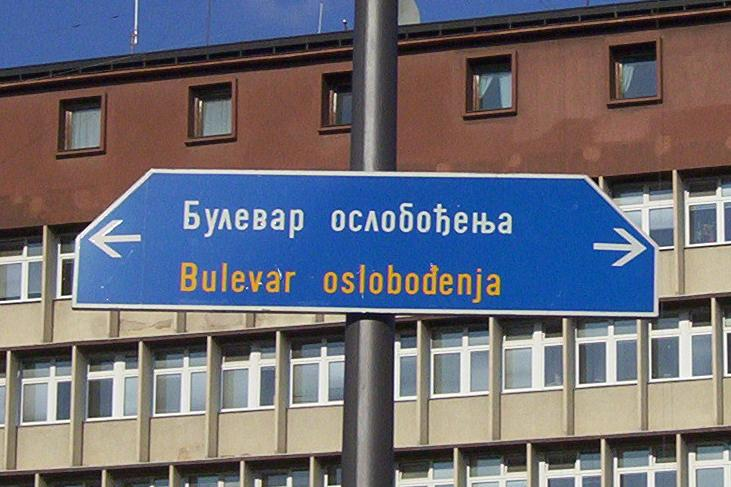
New street sign

Bulevar is situated between the city's train station and Liberty Bridge. It includes parts of the traditional neighborhoods of: Banatić, Sajmište, Grbavica, Rotkvarija, Stari grad, and Liman.

== History ==
Liberation Boulevard was built in several phases, from 1962 until the late seventies. In that time, the new boulevard cut through the old housings establishing major communication lines. Until 1991, the name of the boulevard was Bulevar 23. oktobra (23 October Boulevard), in honour of October 23, 1944 when Novi Sad was liberated from Axis occupation. Today, every bus line in the city (except bus line 1) passes through Liberation Boulevard, making it the most important and busiest street in Novi Sad.

== Features ==
Bulevar is also regarded as an informal city centre. Although most of the important political and cultural institutions are situated in the traditional city centre known as Stari grad, Bulevar is a main place in the city for business and leisure activities. Almost every bank in Serbia has its offices in Bulevar, while the headquarters of some important companies (for example Oil Industry of Serbia and Elektroprivreda) are also located in this area. There are also many bars, shops, restaurants, and one market. Bulevar has a couple of recreational spots, including the Karađorđe Stadium and Liman Park.

== Gallery ==
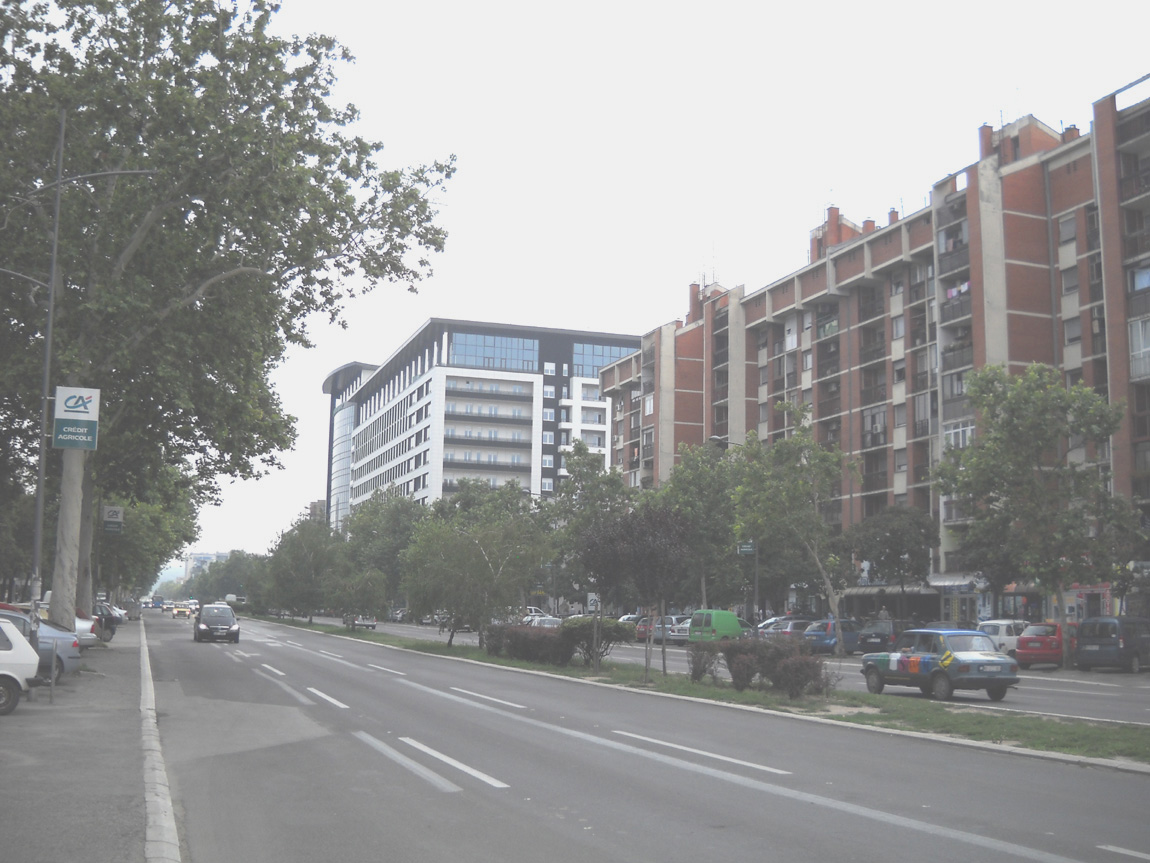
Liberation boulevard

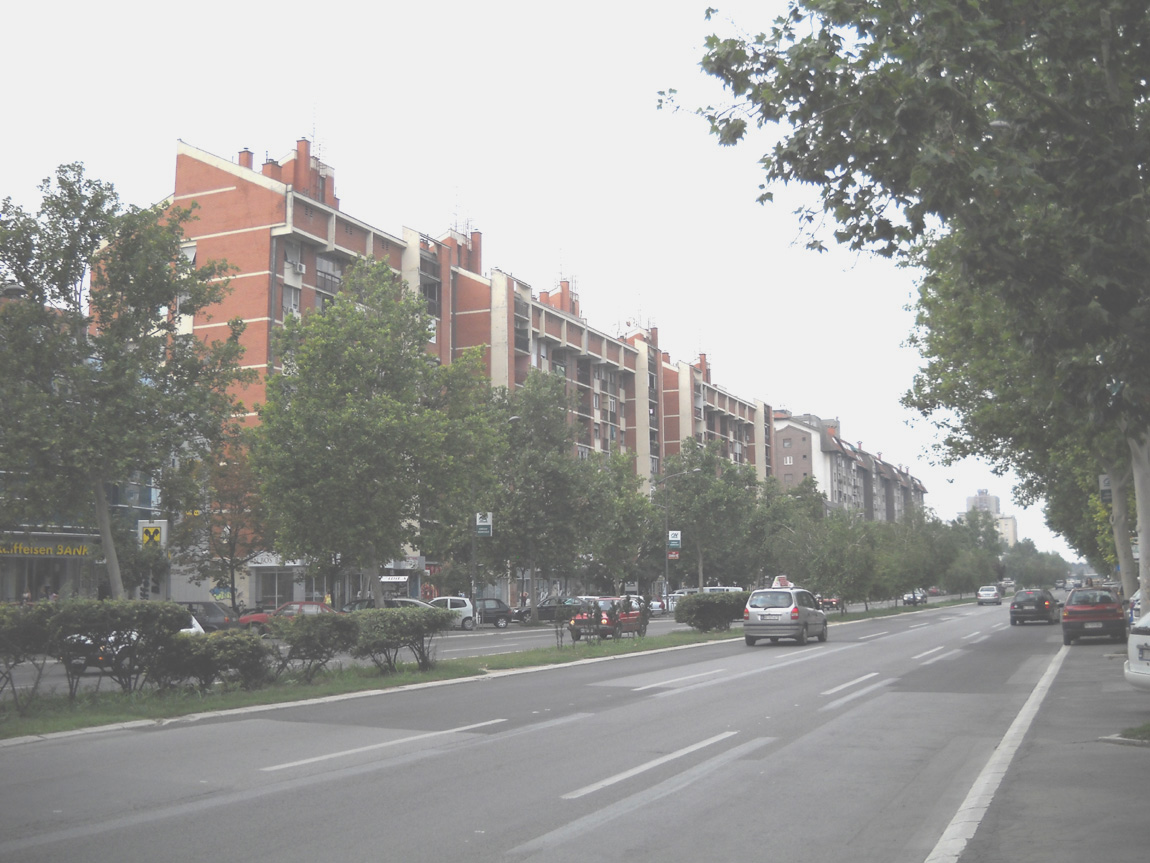
Liberation boulevard

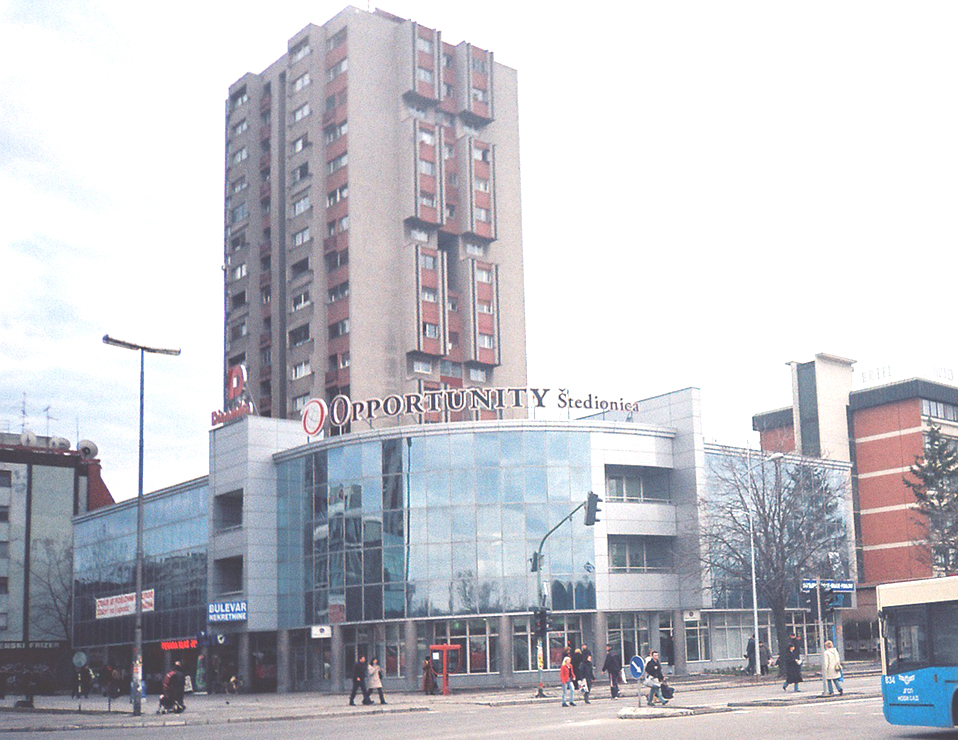
Cross Road of the Liberation Boulevard and Jaša Tomić Boulevard

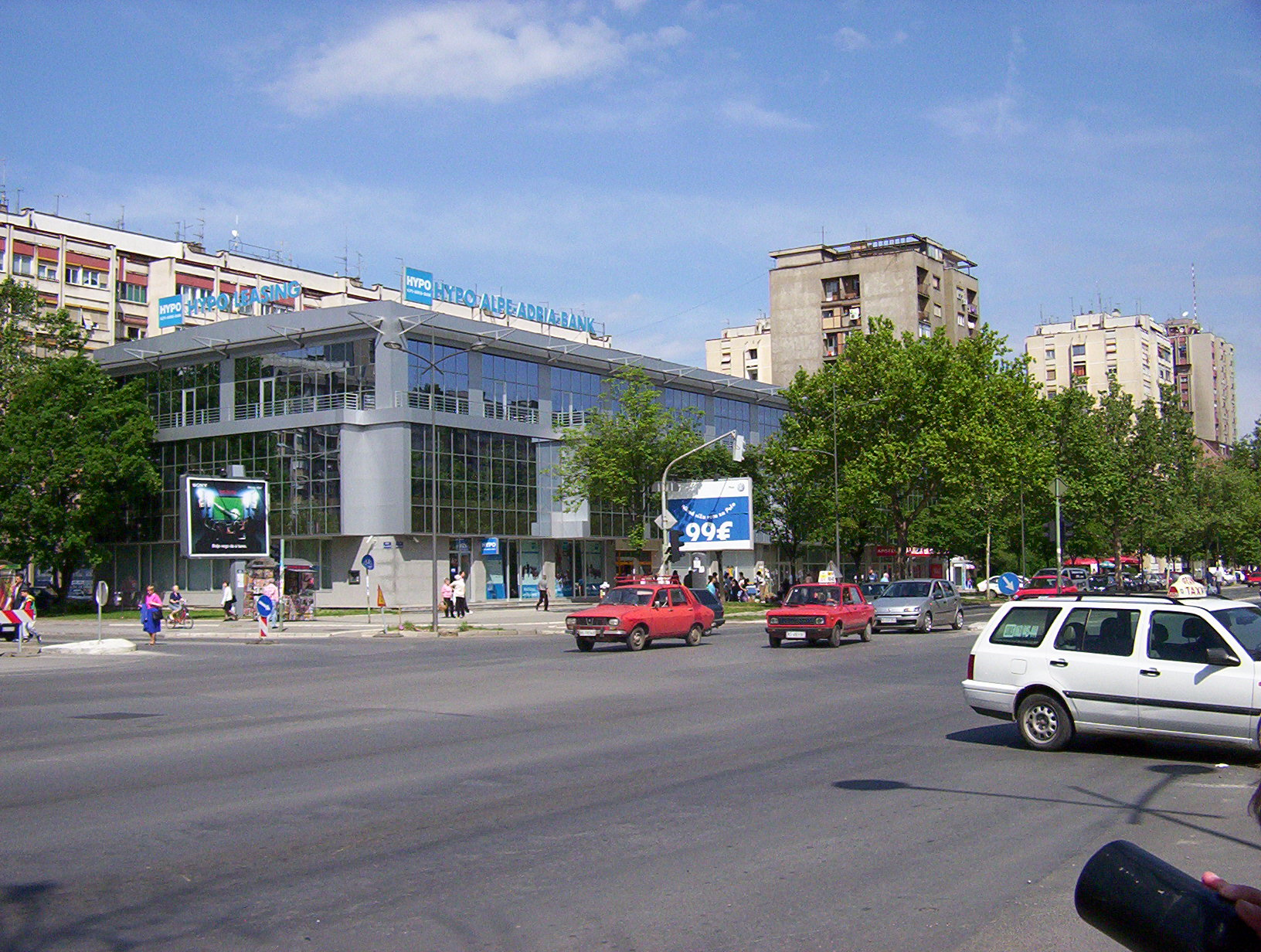
New building in Bulevar

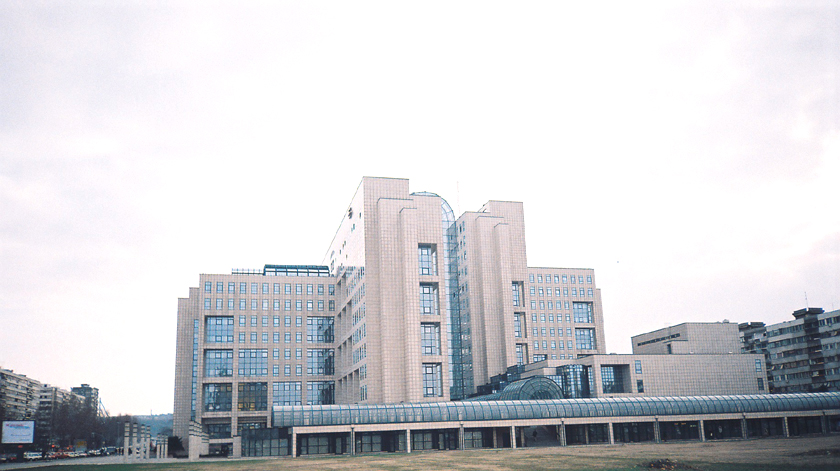
NIS-NAFTAGAS building on the Liberation Boulevard, the seat of the Oil Industry of Serbia

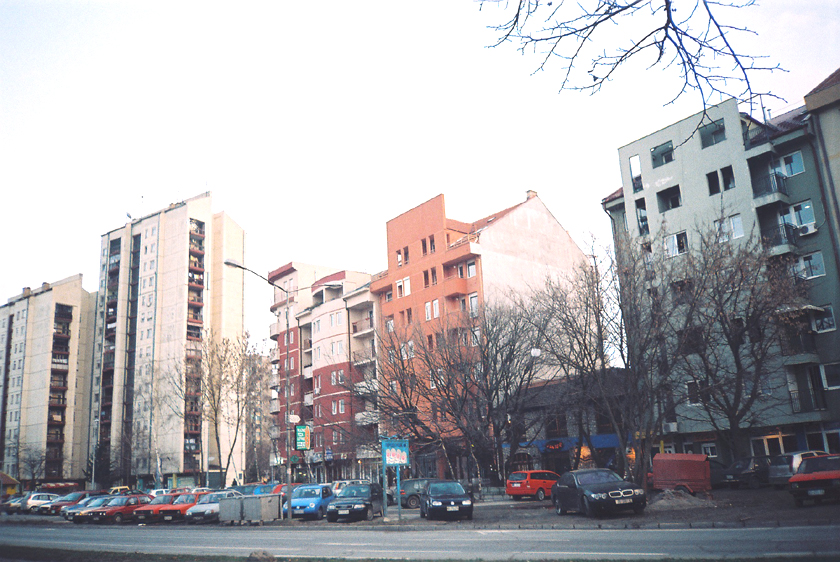
Residential buildings in the vicinity of the Liberation Boulevard

== See also ==
- Neighborhoods of Novi Sad
