= Kikinda oil field =

Oil field in Kikinda, Serbia

Kikinda
- Location within Serbia
- Country: Serbia
- Offshore/onshore: Onshore
- Coordinates: 45.763669°N 20.518397°E
- Operator: NIS-Naftagas

Production
- Current production of oil: none
- Current production of gas: none
- Estimated oil in place: none

The Kikinda oil field is an oil field located in Kikinda, Serbia. The oil from the Kikinda fields are the same genetic type as that of Mokrin oil fields.
