= Tomo Vinković =

Croatian company

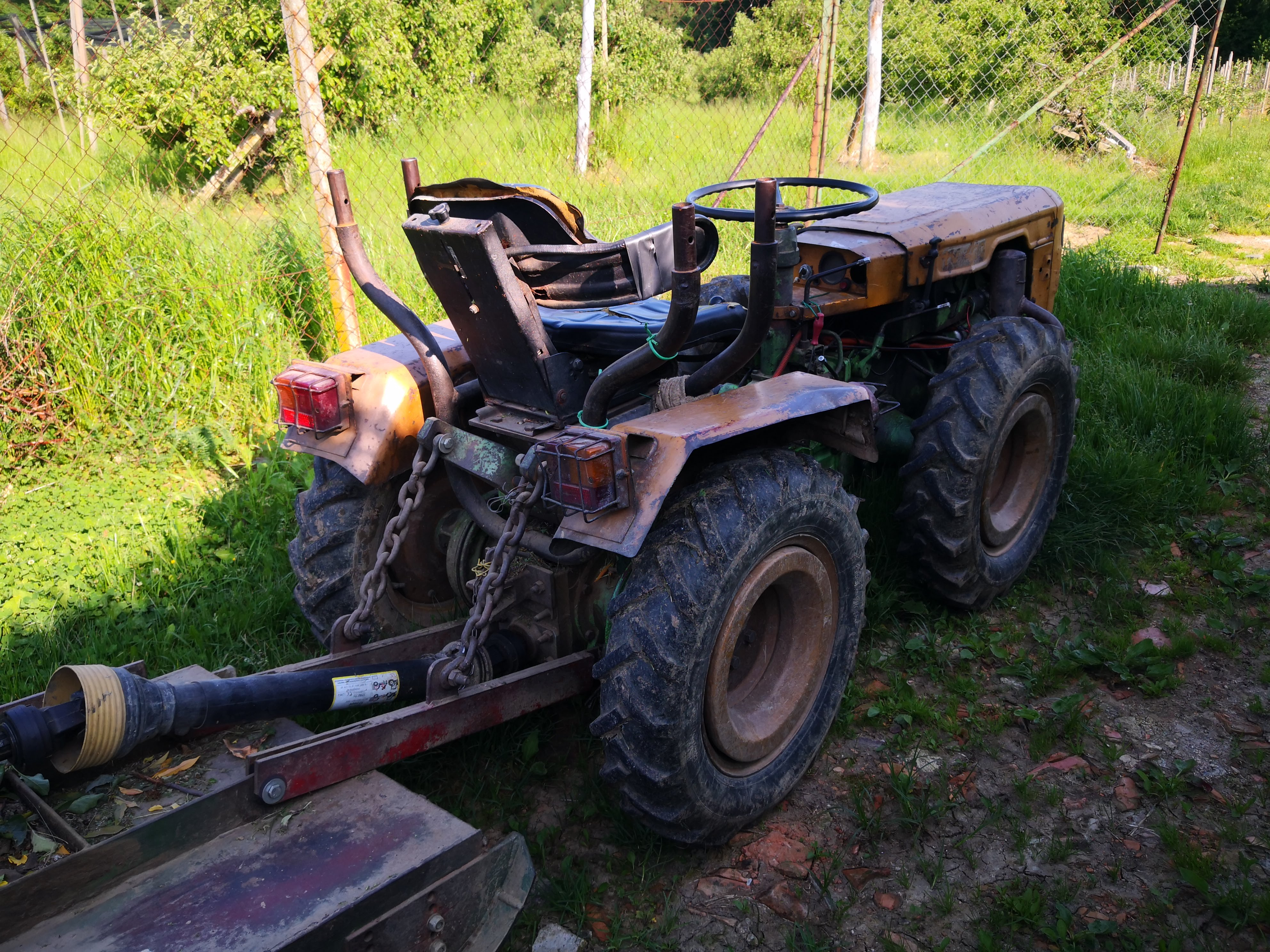
Tomo Vinkovič tractor

Tomo Vinković was a Croatian company that manufactured tractors and agricultural machines. It was founded in 1953 in Bjelovar, SR Croatia. Its products were exported to Poland, Czechoslovakia and Portugal. The factory started struggling in the 1980s and it was renamed to Tvornica traktora Bjelovar in 1990 (English: Bjelovar tractor factory), it went bankrupt in 2000 and completely ceased production on 25 February 2003.

Its tractors are still popular today in Croatia, with high demand on the classified-ads website Njuškalo.

== See also ==
- List of companies of the Socialist Federal Republic of Yugoslavia
