= Slovenijales Trgovina D.o.o =

Trading company from Slovenia

Slovenijales Trgovina D.o.o is a trading company from Slovenia, founded in the 1950s.

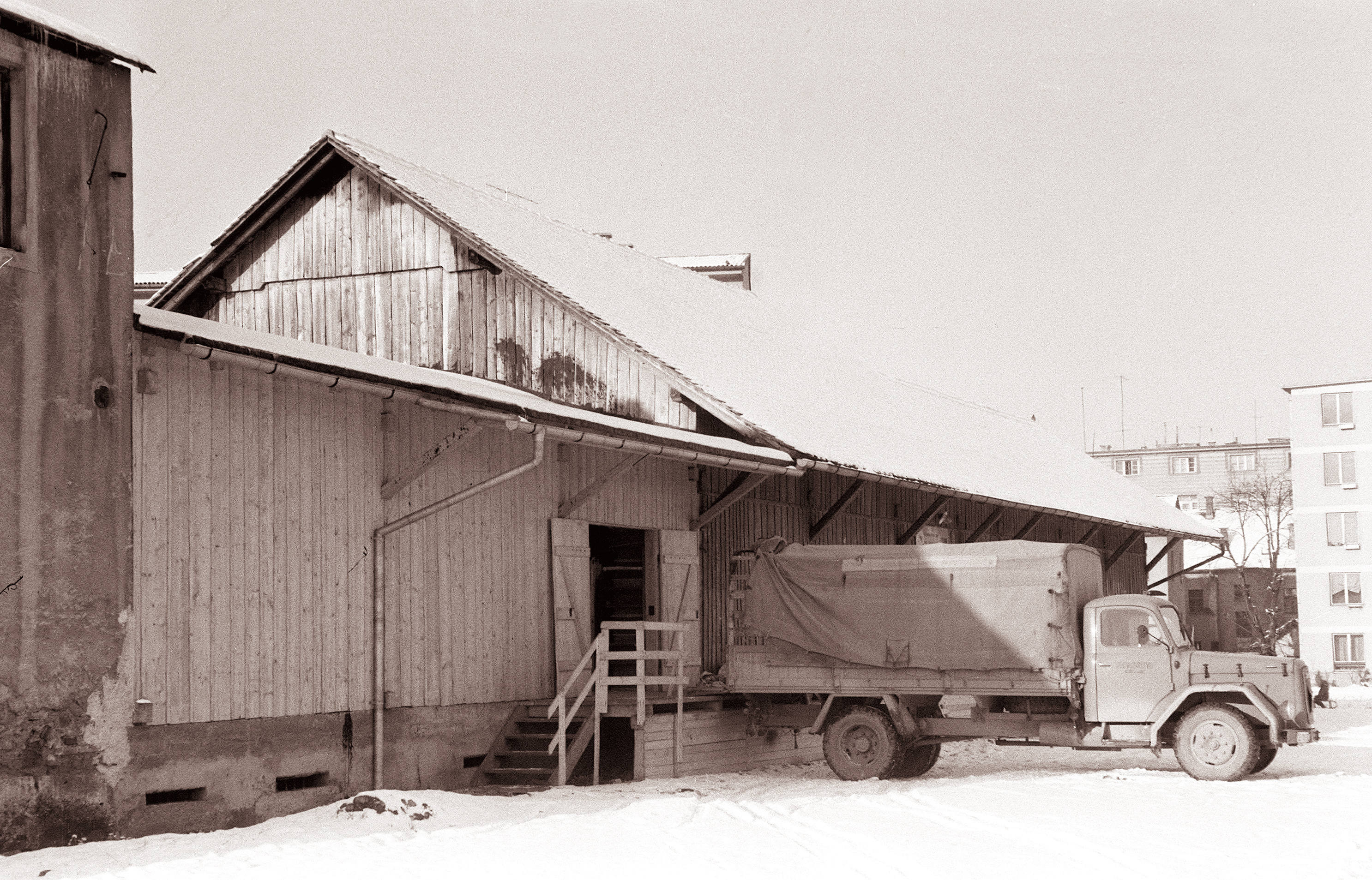
Slovenijales warehouse, 1961.

It specializes in sales of timber, wood and other material products for buildings and home furniture, and raw materials for carpenters. It is one of the largest companies of this sort in Slovenia and former Yugoslavia.

== See also ==
- List of companies of the Socialist Federal Republic of Yugoslavia
