= Digitron (company) =

Croatian electronics company

Digitron is a Croatian electronics company located in Buje, Istria. Their name became eponymous for a handheld calculator in the former Yugoslav area. They are responsible for the release of Europe's first pocket calculator in 1971, called DB 800.

== See also ==
- List of companies of the Socialist Federal Republic of Yugoslavia
