= Njuškalo =

Croatian classified ads website

- Website type: E-commerce
- Available in: Croatian
- Area served: Croatia, Slovenia
- Owner: Styria Media Group
- Revenue: €7.3 million (2017)
- Net income: €1.2 million (2017)
- Employees: 85 (2017)
- Website: www.njuskalo.hr
- Commercial: Yes
- Registration: Optional
- Users: 1.4 million (2018)
- Launched: September 2007
- Current status: Online

Njuskalo.hr is a Croatian classified ads website. It is part of the Styria Media Group and is among top 10 visited websites in Croatia. As of 2018, Njuškalo.hr had 1,4 million users who were selling 250,000 items per month, making it the biggest Croatian classified ads website.
