= Iskra (company) =

Slovenian supplier of electrotechnical products

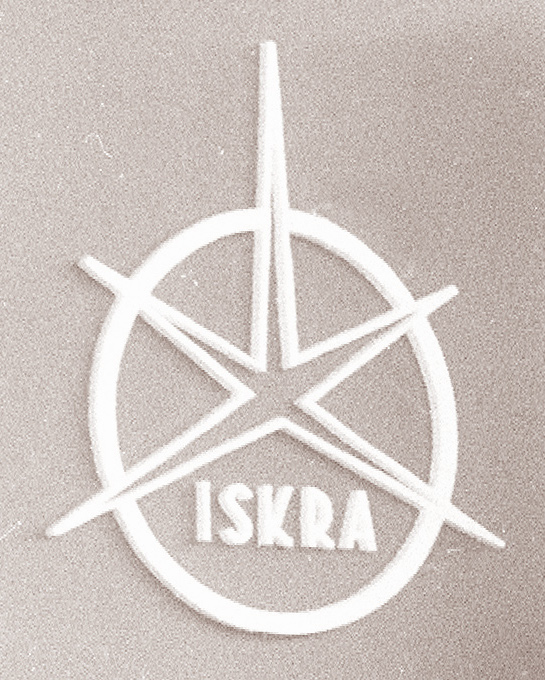
- Founded: 1946; 80 years ago
- Website: www.iskra.eu

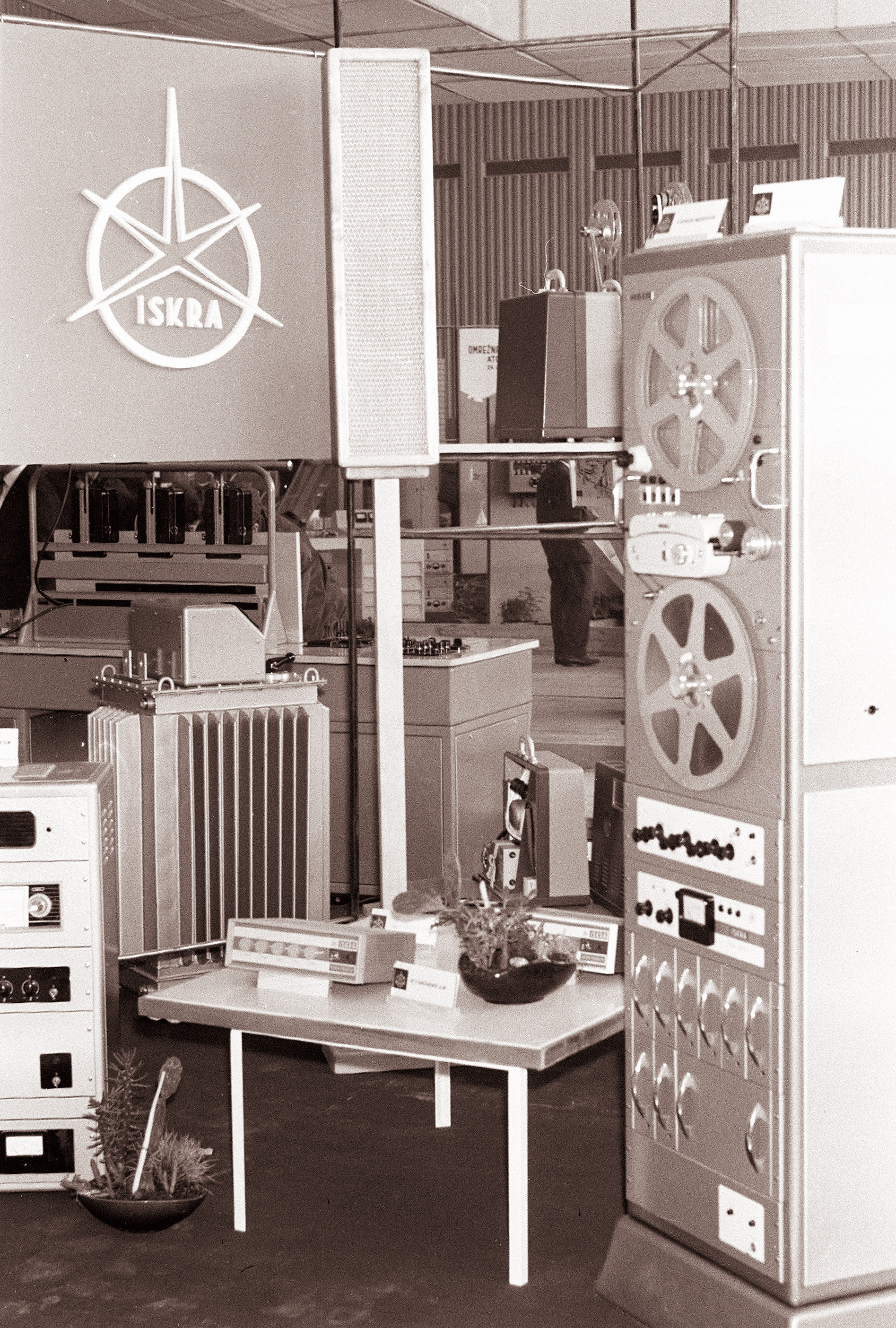
Iskra stand at the 1961 International fair Modern electronics in Ljubljana

Iskra is a Slovenian company for electromechanics, telecommunications, electronics and automation.

== History ==
Iskra developed from the SPRAD and a sole Kranj-based factory, founded in 1941 by Germans as a subsidiary of the Luftfahrtgerätewerk Berlin. It was created at the site of the textile factory Jugočeška in Kranj (Krainburg). After the withdrawal of the occupying forces in 1945, the planned demolition of the factory was averted by staff.

In March 1946, Mirjan Gruden renamed Strojne tovarne Kranj to Iskra (Spark).

One year after it was established, Iskra developed its first switch, followed by its first FM antenna, capacitor, and then one of the key milestones in Iskra's success – the establishment of its design department. In 1962, this was the first industrial design department in Yugoslavia.

The bureau for railway automation, BAŽ, was founded.

In the 1970s, Iskra developed into the largest Yugoslav company for electromechanics, telecommunications, electronics and automation, with industrial design in telephony, measuring instruments, and machinery. At the start of the 1990s, Iskra's logo was on all electrical devices, and the product portfolio was expanded with measuring instruments, short-wave navy radio receivers, drilling machines, movie projectors, etc.

The Iskra ETA80 series of telephones, first presented at the Ljubljana Electronics Fair in 1978 and entering production in 1980, won numerous international awards for design. Shown is the type ETA85-S (1988).

In 1989, Iskra SOZD consisted of the following organizations:

- Iskra Banka
- Iskra Commerce
- Iskra Servis
- Iskra Telematika
- Iskra Delta
- Iskra Kibernetika
- Iskra električna orodja
- Iskra Elektrozveze
- Iskra Merilna elektronika
- Iskra Elektrooptika
- Iskra Avtomatika
- Iskra Orodja
- Iskra Elementi
- Iskra Mikroelektronika
- Iskra Antene
- Iskra Elekroakustika
- Iskra Elektromotorji
- Iskra Videomatika
- Iskra Rotomatika
- Iskra Avtoelektrika
- Iskra Kondenzatorji
- Iskra Baterije Zmaj
- Iskra Institut za kakovost
- Iskra "ZORIN"
- Iskra Invest servis
- Iskra High School

Following the breakup of Yugoslavia, Iskra privatized in Slovenia. The company's operations in Slovenia were divided into many separate companies, including

- Iskratel,
- Iskra Avtoelektrika,
- Iskraemeco acquired in 2008 by Elsewedy Electric,
- Fotona,
- Iskra Amesi,
- Iskra, elektro in elektronska industrija, d.d. (Iskra d.d. for short)

== Today ==
Iskra d.o.o has been the largest knowledge hub in the region for 75 years. Iskra d.o.o is operating in the areas of

- Energy sector
- Electrotechnical components
- Efficient Installations
- Traffic
- Telecommunications
- Security, supply and facility management

== See also ==
- List of companies of the Socialist Federal Republic of Yugoslavia
