= Šipad =

Šipad, d.d.
- Official logo
- Type: Public
- Industry: Wood production
- Founded: 1892; 134 years ago
- Headquarters: Sarajevo, Bosnia and Herzegovina
- Key people: (CEO)
- Website: www.sipad.ba

Šipad was the largest Bosnian producer and manufacturer of wood and lumber products and furniture.

The conglomerate was founded in 1892 by German industrialist Otto von Steinbeis in the Bosnian town of Drvar.

== History ==
The company was known as the Bosnia Company until 1893, when von Steinbeis expanded and renamed it. After the First World War, with the formation of the Kingdom of Yugoslavia, it grew into one of the largest Bosnian industrial organizations. Between 1927 and 1937 Šipad exported 150,000 m3 of lumber annually.

After the Second World War, with the formation of socialist Yugoslavia, the local Bosnian authorities once again reformed Šipad into a publicly owned conglomerate in 1948. During the 1960s business was expanded into the fields of furniture and joinery production. By the mid-1980s Šipad owned over 195 manufacturing and sales companies, 11 research institutions, with over 35 representative offices across Europe and the Middle East. During this period it owned 30% of all Yugoslav forests and had a 30% share of all wood and lumber exports from the country, with over 84,000 employees.

With the conclusion of the Bosnian war in 1996, Šipad was reorganized into a co-partnership.

During the following decade, Šipad struggled to reopen its Sarajevo headquarters.

== See also ==
- List of companies of the Socialist Federal Republic of Yugoslavia
