= Economy of the Socialist Federal Republic of Yugoslavia =

Economy of Socialist Yugoslavia
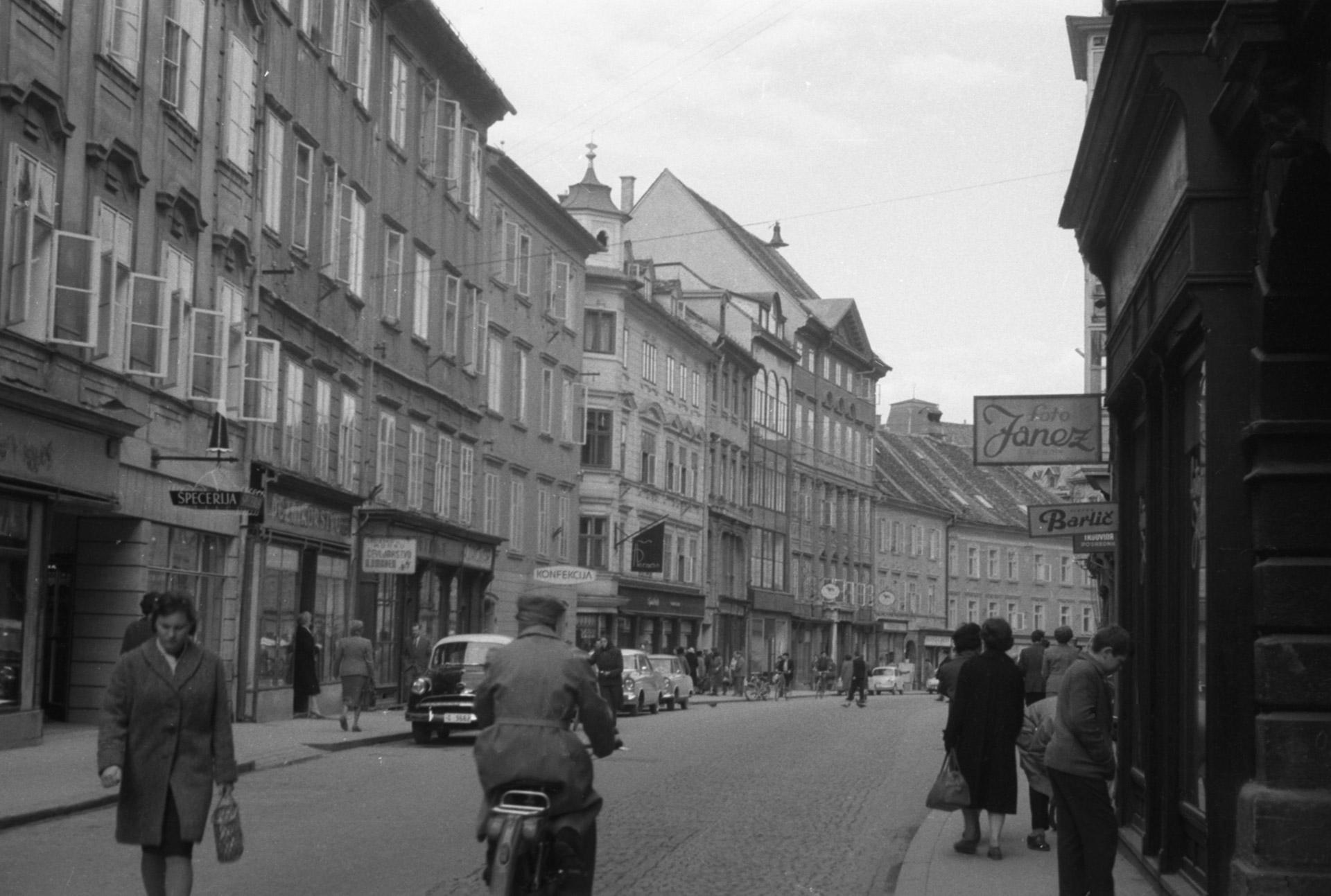
- Ljubljana, a major economic center of Yugoslavia, 1960, along with capital city Belgrade and financial hub Zagreb
- Currency: Yugoslav dinar (YUD)
- Fiscal year: 1 January – 31 December

Statistics
- GDP: ▼$120.1 billion (24th) (1991)
- GDP growth: ▼ −6.3% (1991)
- GDP per capita: ▼$5,040 (59th) (1991, nominal)
- Inflation (CPI): ▲164% (7th) (1991)
- Labour force: ▼9,600,000 (32nd) (1991)
- Unemployment: ▲16% (21st) (1991)
- Main industries: metallurgy, machinery and equipment, petroleum, chemicals, textiles, wood processing, food processing, pulp and paper, motor vehicles, building materials

External
- Exports: $13.1 billion (39th) (1991)
- Imports: $17.6 billion (32nd) (1991)
- Gross external debt: $18 billion (36th) (1991)

Public finance
- Revenue: $6.4 billion (51st) (1991)
- Spending: $6.4 billion (52nd) (1991)
- Economic aid: $3.5 billion (1966–88)
- All values, unless otherwise stated, are in US dollars.

The Socialist Federal Republic of Yugoslavia (SFRY)'s economy was a developing market socialist economy largely in Southeast Europe from 1946 to 1992. It was a hybrid socialist economic system that operated from the end of World War II until the country's dissolution in the early 1990s. The economy was characterized by a combination of market mechanisms and state-planning, with a focus on worker self-management and decentralized decision-making. It was a partially open economy with accommodative foreign policy. At its peak in the 1970s, it was routinely the 21st-largest economy in the world.

After World War II, Yugoslavia underwent rapid industrialization in the 1950s and 1960s. Public spending focused on education, healthcare, and welfare programs. In 1965, the country economically decentralized to its constituent republics. Yugoslavia experienced high unemployment and persistent inflation. Large numbers of citizens worked abroad to generate significant remittance income for the Yugoslav government and citizens. Economic development continued in the 1970s but large-scale borrowing from international institutions led to an unsustainable national debt.

Later political and economic instability in the region during the 1980s, led to the eventual collapse and dissolution of Yugoslavia by 1992. The largest economies of Yugoslavia were former Northern republics, namely Croatia, Serbia, and Slovenia; former Southern republics, Montenegro, North Macedonia, and Bosnia and Herzegovina underwent nation-building. All six former republics have free trade agreements among themselves, with Croatia and Slovenia acceding to the European Union and Eurozone. The region continues to see high levels of tourism, agriculture, and industrial growth.

== Post-World War II years ==
The occupation and liberation struggle in World War II left Yugoslavia's underdeveloped industrial infrastructure and productive capacity largely damaged or destroyed. The first postwar years saw implementation of a Soviet-style five-year plan, prepared under the guidance of Boris Kidrič. The objectives of the ambitious plan were to industrialise and electrify the country, build new factories, mines and power stations, as well as roads, bridges, railways, houses and public buildings. In agriculture, which covered 70% of population, the task was to increase food production by the use of modern machinery, better stock and fertilisers, as well as new methods and processes. The reform meant that, while farmer households could own up to 10 hectares (25 acres) of land per person, the excess farmland was owned by co-ops, agricultural companies, or local communities. These could sell and buy land, as well as give it to people in perpetual lease.

Many of the public works were delivered using volunteer labour organised in Youth Work Actions including some of the key infrastructure items such as the Zagreb-Belgrade highway, Jablanica dam and New Belgrade. In summer 1948, the country's leadership broke-off with the Soviet Union, which put an additional strain on the economic development as access to credit, machinery and the export markets from fellow socialist countries ended. The country was forced to look more towards the west for assistance. Hence, despite common origins, the Yugoslav economy was significantly different from that of the Soviet Union or their Eastern European followers.

== 1950s – Socialist self-management ==
In 1950, Socialist Self-management system was introduced, which reduced the state involvement in management of enterprises. Managers of "socially owned companies" were appointed by Workers' Councils, which were elected by all employees, with one vote each. The Communist Party (renamed to the League of Communists) was organized in all companies and most influential employees were likely to be members of the party, so the managers were often, but not always, appointed only with the consent of workers who happened to be members of the party. There were occasional tensions between market-oriented managers and worker representatives. Though GDP is not technically applicable or designed to measure planned economies, Yugoslavia's GDP in 1950 ranked twenty-second in Europe.

Unemployment was a chronic problem for Yugoslavia. The unemployment rates were among the highest in Europe during its existence, while the education level of the work force increased steadily. The unemployment rate reached 7% in the early 1960s and continued to grow, doubling by the mid-1970s. There were extreme regional differences in unemployment, with the Slovenian rate never exceeding 5%, while Macedonia and Kosovo constantly had rates over 20%. There was also a notable element of gender discrimination in the unemployment rate. When forced to cut workforce, enterprises usually fired women first, expecting that women can be supported by their male family members. Some enterprises also requested that candidates for a job needed to have their military service completed, which excluded women. Female participation rates were lower than in other socialist countries and closer to traditionalist societies of Southern Europe.

== 1960s – Reforms and guest-workers schemes ==
Due to Yugoslavia's neutrality, and its leading role in the Non-Aligned Movement, Yugoslavia traded with both Western and Eastern markets. Starting in the early 1950s, it also received billions of dollars of Western foreign aid, mostly from the United States. The trade with Non-Aligned countries amounted to only 15% of total trade in 1965. Despite several trade agreements, it never managed to become significant because of its geographic distance and the fact that both sides were exporters of commodities and simple products, interested mostly in imports of Western technological goods.

In 1964, when Yugoslavia was granted special associate status with Comecon, its trade with Eastern markets was less than 25% of total trade, and OECD was the main trading partner with around 60%. Yugoslavia had trade account deficits in almost every year of its existence.

Yugoslav companies carried out construction of numerous major infrastructural and industrial projects in Africa, Europe and Asia. Many of these projects were carried out by Energoprojekt, a Yugoslav engineering and construction firm founded in 1951 to rebuild the country's war devastated infrastructure. By the early 1980s, Energoprojekt was the world's 16th largest engineering and construction company, employing 7,000 people. The company carried out large construction projects in Libya, Kuwait, Zambia and Guinea, and by the late 1960s, the company was competing in European markets in West Germany, Czechoslovakia, and the German Democratic Republic. Many infrastructure projects in Africa and Asia were political deals, done for prestige reasons and included elements of foreign aid rather than being the result of economic calculation and competition.

The official workweek was 48 hours until 1963, when it was reduced to 42 hours. It was further reduced to 40 hours (plus one hour overtime allowed) in 1965 and to 36 (plus one) in 1970.

In 1965, a new dinar was introduced. The previous dinar, traded at a rate of 700 to the U.S. dollar, was replaced with a new dinar traded at 12.5 to the U.S. dollar.

In 1967, legislation enabled foreign private investors to become partners with Yugoslav enterprises in joint ventures with up to 49% of capital, despite the fact that such arrangement would be classified as exploitation in Marxist theory. German companies were especially interested in such arrangements and they represented about a quarter of foreign investments. However, many foreign companies were disappointed by the poor efficiency and organization of Yugoslav enterprises; in one case, Japanese representatives concluded that they would consider investment only if half of the workers were fired.

The exact nature and extent of market socialism in Yugoslavia is debated by economists. The market mechanism was limited mostly to consumer goods, while capital, labor, materials and intermediate goods were allocated by different means. The Yugoslav model didn't have much in common with the classic model of market socialism imagined by Oskar R. Lange. John Roemer, an advocate of market socialism, had a very negative view of the Yugoslav experiment, claiming that Yugoslav companies weren't run on true market principles of competition and profit, and that they instead relied on soft budget constraints and were subjected to political control, which created a deeply inefficient system that ultimately collapsed. While admitting that it is somewhat problematic to use the term market in the context of socialist countries such as Yugoslavia or Hungary (after the introduction of New Economic Mechanism), János Kornai believed that the term market socialism is still appropriate because such countries at least partially experimented with markets under socialism which would otherwise remain only an abstract idea.

The departure of Yugoslavs seeking work began in the 1950s, when individuals began crossing the border illegally. In the mid-1960s, Yugoslavia lifted emigration restrictions, and the number of emigrants, including educated and highly skilled individuals, increased rapidly, especially to West Germany. By the early 1970s, 20 percent of the country's labor force, or 1.1 million workers, were employed abroad. The emigration was mainly caused by forced deagrarianization, deruralization, and overpopulating of larger towns. The emigration contributed to keeping the unemployment in check and also acted as a source of capital and foreign currency. The system was institutionalized into the economy. From 1961 to 1971, the number of guest workers from Yugoslavia in West Germany increased from 16,000 to 410,000.

== 1970s – Associated labour and the oil crises ==
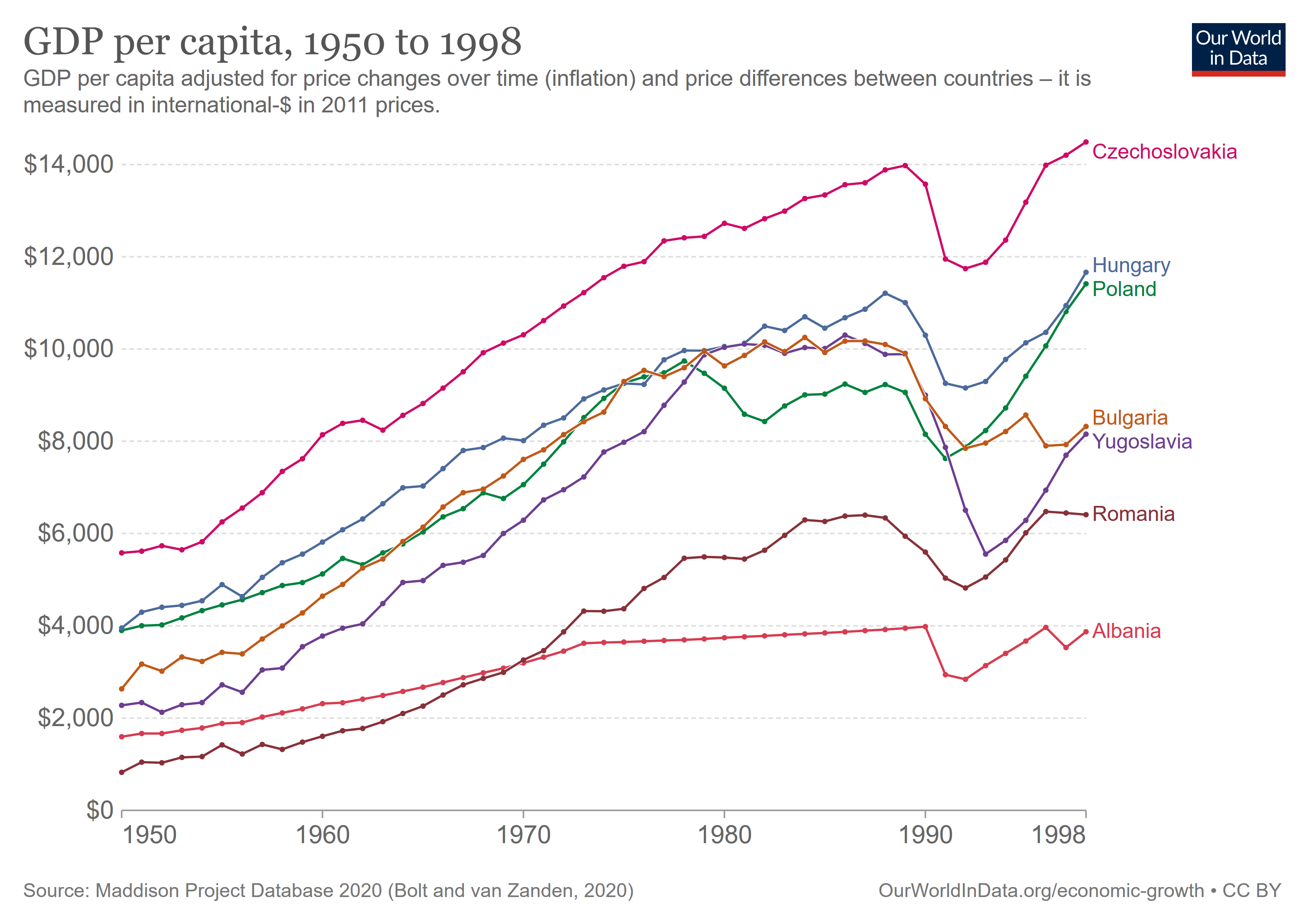
Per Capita GDP of Yugoslavia and of Eastern bloc economies from 1950 to 1990.

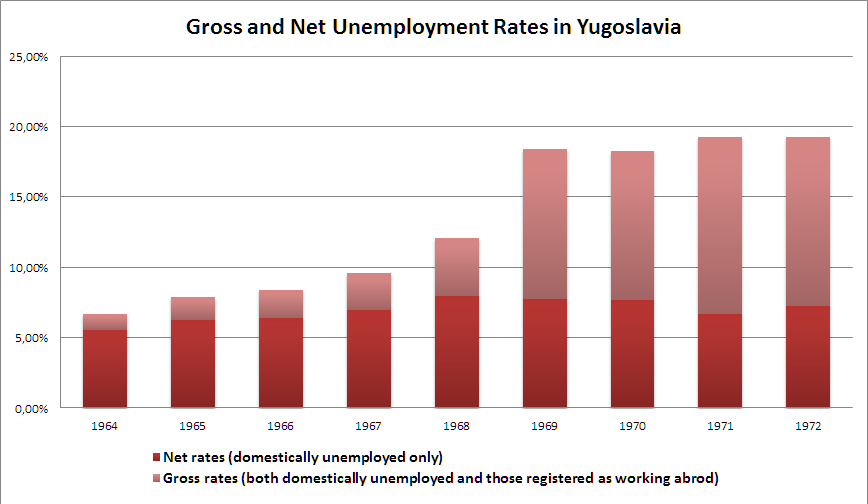
Gross and Net Unemployment Rates in Yugoslavia from 1964 to 1972

In the 1970s, the economy was reorganised according to Edvard Kardelj's theory of associated labour (Serbo-Croatian: udruženi rad), in which the right to decision making and a share in profits of socially owned companies is based on the investment of labour. All industrial companies were transformed into organisations of associated labour (organizacije udruženog rada). The smallest, basic organisations of associated labour (osnovne organizacije udruženog rada), roughly corresponded to a small company or a department in a large company. These were organised into enterprises, also known as labour organisations (radne organizacije), which in turn associated with composite organisations of associated labour (složene organizacije udruženog rada), which could be large companies or even whole industry branches in a certain area. Basic organisations of associated labour sometimes were composed of even smaller labour units (radne grupe), but they had no financial freedom. Also, composite organisations of associated labour were sometimes members of business communities, representing whole industry branches. Most executive decision making was based in enterprises, so that these continued to compete to an extent even when they were part of a same composite organisation. The appointment of managers and strategic policy of composite organisations were, depending on their size and importance, in practice often subject to political and personal influence-peddling.

In order to give all employees the same access to decision making, the basic organisations of associated labour were also introduced into public services, including health and education. The basic organisations were usually made up of dozens of people and had their own workers councils, whose assent was needed for strategic decisions and appointment of managers in enterprises or public institutions.

The workers were organized into trade unions which spanned across the country. Strikes could be called by any worker, or any group of workers and they were common in certain periods. Strikes for clear genuine grievances with no political motivation usually resulted in prompt replacement of the management and increase in pay or benefits. Strikes with real or implied political motivation were often dealt with in the same manner (individuals were prosecuted or persecuted separately), but occasionally also met stubborn refusal to deal or in some cases brutal force. Strikes occurred in all times of political upheaval or economic hardships, but they became increasingly common in the 1980s, when consecutive governments tried to salvage the slumping economy with a programme of austerity under the auspices of the International Monetary Fund.

From 1970 onwards, despite 29% of its population working in agriculture, Yugoslavia was a net importer of farm products.

During the 1960s and 1970s the country's social security expenditures increased 600%, as coverage of the population was extended and benefits were enlarged. The government introduced extensive subsidies for public health care, temporary disability and illness, old age pensions and assistance to mothers. There were, in particular, a great number of social security benefits intended to take the pressure of child raising off women, making it easier for them to focus on studying and gaining employment. Women received 90 days of paid maternity leave after having a baby, a range of other subsidies to help pay for food, clothing and other necessities. There were also subsidised public childcare services that low-income families could use for free.

=== Effect of the oil crisis ===
The oil crisis of the 1970s magnified the economic problems, the foreign debt grew at an annual rate of 20%, and by the early 1980s it reached more than US$20 billion. Governments of Milka Planinc and Branko Mikulić renegotiated the foreign debt at the price of introducing the policy of stabilisation which in practice consisted of severe austerity measures—the so-called shock treatment. During the 1980s, Yugoslav population endured the introduction of fuel limitations (40 litres per car per month), limitation of car usage to every other day, based on the last digit on the licence plate, severe limitations on import of goods and paying of a deposit upon leaving the country (mostly to go shopping), to be returned in a year (with rising inflation, this effectively amounted to a fee on travel). There were shortages of coffee, chocolate and washing powder. During several dry summers, the government, unable to borrow to import electricity, was forced to introduce power cuts. On May 12, 1982, the board of the International Monetary Fund approved enhanced surveillance of Yugoslavia, to include Paris Club creditors.

== 1980 – Continued decline and the collapse of Yugoslav economy ==
Year	Debt	Inflation	GDP (billion US$)	Average annual growth considering USD inflation	Unemployment
1954	$400 million				
1965	$1.2 billion	34.6%		9.11%	6.6%
1971	$3.177 billion		15.8 (20.11%)	12.95%	6.7%
1973	$4.7 billion	20%	21.5 (21.86%)	17.75%	9.1% or 8.1%
1980	$18.9 billion	27%	70.0 (27%)	12.13%	13.8%
1982	$20 billion	40%	62.8 (31.85%)	−7.07%	14.4%
1987	$21.961 billion	167%	84.6 (25.96%)	−1.4%	16.1%

In the 1980s the Yugoslav economy entered a period of continuous crisis. Between 1979 and 1985 the Yugoslav dinar plunged from 15 to 1,370 to the U.S. dollar, half of the income from exports was used to service the debt, while real net personal income declined by 19.5%. Unemployment rose to 1.3 million job-seekers, and internal debt was estimated at $40 billion.

Yugoslavia took on a number of International Monetary Fund (IMF) loans and subsequently fell into heavy debt. By 1981, it had incurred $18.9 billion in foreign debt. In fact Yugoslavia's debt was just 20.11% of GDP in 1971, which is, when compared with UK (67.95%), US (46.64%), West Germany (17.87%), Italy (41.46%), a comparatively low rate. However, Yugoslavia's main concern was unemployment. In 1980 the unemployment rate was at 13.8%, not counting around 1 million workers employed abroad. Deteriorating living conditions during the 1980s caused the Yugoslav unemployment rate to reach 17 percent, while another 20 percent were underemployed. 60% of the unemployed were under the age of 25.

By 1988 emigrant remittances to Yugoslavia totaled over US$4.5 billion, and by 1989 remittances were US$6.2 billion, which amounted to over 19% of the world's total. A large portion of those remittances came from Yugoslav professional and skilled workers employed by Yugoslav engineering and construction firms with contracts abroad, including large infrastructure projects in the Middle East, Africa and Europe. In the early 1980s, Yugoslav firm Energoprojekt was building dams, roads and apartment houses in Iraq, Libya and Kuwait. But during the recession of the early 1980s many oil exporting countries reduced construction projects as oil prices fell. Increased competition from countries like South Korea offering less expensive labor, also contributed to a decline in Yugoslavia's booming engineering and construction export trade.

In 1988 Yugoslavia owed US$21 billion to Western countries, which was to increase substantially annually had the country not defaulted.

=== Late 1980s ===
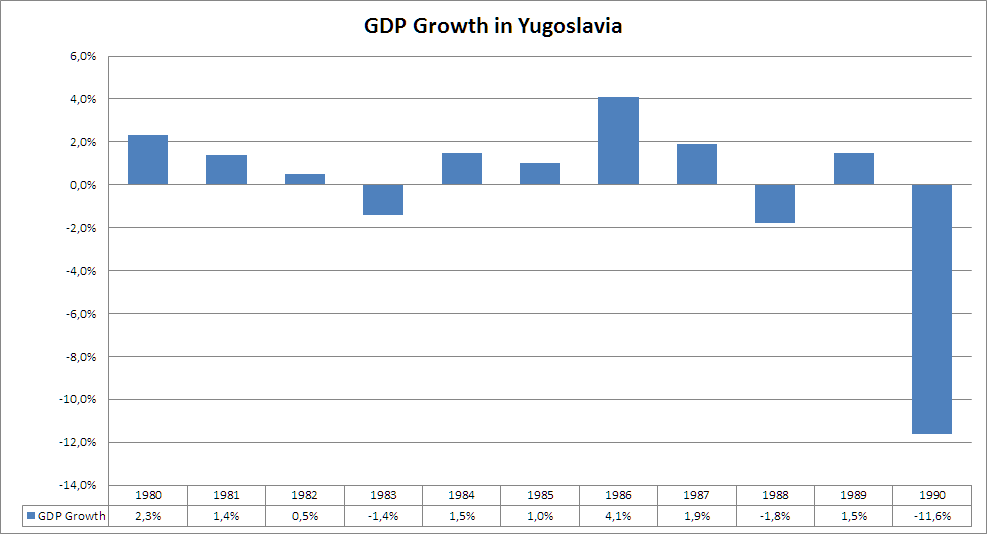
Real GDP Growth in Yugoslavia from 1980 to 1990

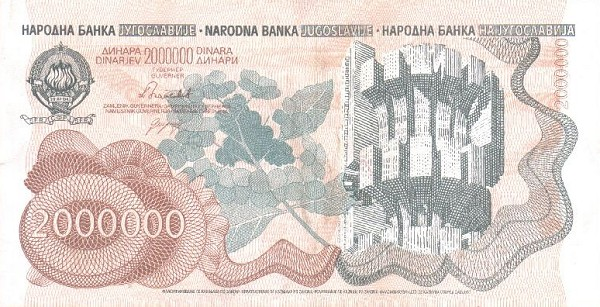
A 2,000,000 dinar bill was introduced in 1989 as a result of the hyperinflation.

The collapse of the Yugoslav economy was partially caused by its non-aligned stance that had resulted in access to loans from both superpower blocs on different terms. This contact with the United States and the West opened up Yugoslav markets sooner than in the rest of Central and Eastern Europe. In 1989, before the fall of the Berlin Wall, Yugoslav federal Prime Minister Ante Marković went to Washington to meet with President George H. W. Bush, to negotiate a new financial aid package. In return for assistance, Yugoslavia agreed to even more sweeping economic reforms, which included a new devalued currency, another wage freeze, sharp cuts in government spending, and the elimination of socially owned, worker-managed companies. The Belgrade nomenclature, with the assistance of western advisers, had laid the groundwork for Marković's mission by implementing beforehand many of the required reforms, including a major liberalization of foreign investment legislation.

The country's state owned banks obligated to adjust their interest rates to the inflation, but this could not be applied to loan contracts made earlier which stipulated fixed interest rates. During this time, foreign currencies became widely circulated and accepted by businesses along with cheques; especially the German mark.

The first hyperinflation stabilization program was adopted under the name Economic Reform Program, passed in late 1989, when, for the most part, due to total price liberalization, Yugoslavia was hit by hyperinflation. The monthly price level increased from month to month, and in December 1989, the inflation percentage was 45%. There was a constant rally in prices, wages and exchange rates. In such a situation in December 1989, the Economic Reform Program and measures for its implementation were adopted.

The basic measures envisaged by this program were restrictive monetary policy and real positive interest rates, independence of the National Bank of Yugoslavia, denomination of the dinar by "deleting" four zeros, proclaiming the convertibility of the dinar and fixing the dinar exchange rate against the German mark at a ratio of 7:1, freezing of nominal wages for a period of 4 months, freezing of the prices of some inputs (energy products and infrastructure) for a period of 4 months, further foreign trade and fiscal account liberalization, rehabilitation of banks and companies through a special fund that would be formed with foreign financial support, negotiations with the Paris Club of Creditors about debt restructuring, and the International Monetary Fund and the World Bank for a loan to help stabilize the economy.

In the short term, or at the beginning of the application, the program showed some good results: there was a significant slowdown in price and salary growth, foreign exchange reserves—whose level was significant even before the beginning of the application of the program—started to grow, there was marked positive progress in reducing the foreign trade and budget deficits, etc. However, from the very beginning, there was a decline in industrial production and employment, and somewhat later, the initial positive results also started lacking (as a result of the rebound in prices and wages and the appearance of the "black" exchange rate, the foreign exchange reserves began to decrease rapidly, negative tendencies appeared in the foreign trade and budget sphere, etc.)

The fate of this stabilization program was largely tied to stopping price growth. It was considered that only the prices of the main inputs were to be frozen, and in the conditions of restrictive monetary policy and liberalized imports there would be no growth in other freely formed prices, and even companies were expected to reduce prices in order to provide liquid assets. However, expectations did not materialize, and the prices recorded significant growth (the truth is noticeably smaller than before the program was adopted), which led to a rise in wages that (at the very beginning of the implementation of the Program) grew faster than price growth. In circumstances where this happens, one of the key elements of the Program persists—a fixed exchange rate. All this led to a weakening of the competitiveness of the domestic economy, as exports become economically unfeasible, and imports were very lucrative. Bearing in mind that there had been a liberalization of imports, the domestic market was overwhelmed with imported products, which were absorbed by increasing domestic demand, almost exclusively for consumer goods fueled by rapid wage growth. Imports of goods became cheaper than domestic ones, so there was a decline in production because Yugoslav products were not competitive at all, not only in exports but also in the domestic market. After only a year and a half of implementation, industrial production was reduced by 25% and unemployment increased by 18%. This further led to strong recession movements in the economy, deterioration of the foreign trade balance and (after initial increase) a rapid reduction in foreign currency reserves, which prevents further "defending" of the foreign exchange rate.

New legislation was gradually introduced to remedy the situation, but the government mostly tried to fight the crisis by issuing more currency, which only fuelled the inflation further. Power-mongering in big industrial companies led to several large bankruptcies (mostly of large factories), which only increased the public perception that the economy is in a deep crisis. After several failed attempts to fight the inflation with various schemes, and due to mass strikes caused by austerity wage freezes, the government of Branko Mikulić resigned and was replaced by a new government in March 1989, headed by Ante Marković, former president of the Government of Croatia and a pragmatic reformist.

=== Ante Marković and his government ===
Marković spent a year introducing new business legislation, which quietly dropped most of the associated labour theory and introduced private ownership of businesses. The institutional changes culminated in eighteen new laws that declared an end to the self-management system and associated labor. They in turn allowed public companies to become privatised.

By the end of 1989 inflation reached 1,000%. On New Year's Eve 1989, Ante Marković introduced his program of economic reforms. Ten thousand Dinars became one "New Dinar", pegged to the German Mark at the rate of 7 New Dinars for one Mark. The sudden end of inflation brought some relief to the banking system. Ownership and exchange of foreign currency was deregulated which, combined with a realistic exchange rate, attracted foreign currency to the banks. However, by the late 1980s, it was becoming increasingly clear that the federal government was effectively losing the power to implement its programme.

In 1990, Marković introduced a privatization program, with newly passed federal laws on privatization allowing company management boards to initiate privatization, mainly through internal share-holding schemes, initially not tradable in the stock exchange. This meant that the law put an emphasis on "insider" privatization to company workers and managers, to whom the shares could be offered at a discount. Yugoslav authorities used the term "property transformation" when referring to the process of transforming public ownership into private hands. By April 1990, the monthly inflation rate dropped to zero, exports and imports increased, while foreign currency reserves increased by US$3 billion. However, industrial production fell by 8.7% and high taxes made it difficult for many enterprises to pay even the frozen wages.

In July 1990, Marković formed his own Union of Reform Forces political party. By the 2nd half of 1990 inflation restarted. In September and October, the monthly inflation rate reached 8%. Inflation once more climbed to unmanageable levels reaching an annual level of 120%. Marković's reforms and austerity programs met resistance from the federal authorities of the individual republics. His program of 1989 to curb inflation was rejected by Serbia and Vojvodina. SR Serbia introduced customs duties on imports from Croatia and Slovenia and took $1.5 billion from the central bank to fund wage rises, pensions, bonuses to government employees and subsidize enterprises that faced losses. The federal government raised the exchange rate for the German Mark first to 9 and then to 13 dinars. In 1990 the annual rate of GDP growth had declined to −11.6%.

Although the Yugoslav economy did include elements of workplace democracy and gave workers more democratic control over the economic management of enterprises, it also caused high regional inequality. Slovenia's GDP Per Capita was $12383 and Kosovo's GDP per capita only $1,592 by 1989. The Gini index of SFRY ranged between 0.32 and 0.35, mainly due to the high regional inequality. Unemployment rates were also disproportionately high in poorer Yugoslav republics. Such a sizeable regional disparity gave rise to separatism and eventually led to increased intrastate tensions in the Yugoslav republics. However, the economic transition of Slovenia was rather successful, and it retained many institutional elements of the Former Yugoslav economy, such as self-management and partial worker-controlled enterprises. The Slovenian Model can be seen as a reconciliation of Western European social democracy and the market socialism of the Yugoslav economy. The large-scale privatization of state assets, banks, and shock therapy in other former Yugoslav republics, such as Serbia, are, in contrast, unsuccessful. The economies of these states stagnate with a generally high level of corruption compared to the more successful Slovenian model.

== Yugoslav economy in numbers – 1990 ==
The following stats are based on the CIA World Factbook published in 1990:

- Inflation rate (consumer prices): 2,700% (1989 est.)
- Unemployment rate: 15% (1989)
- GDP: $129.5 billion, per capita $5,464; real growth rate – 1.0% (1989 est.)
- Budget: revenues $6.4 billion; expenditures $6.4 billion, including capital expenditures of $NA (1990)
- Exports: $13.1 billion (f.o.b., 1988); commodities—raw materials and semimanufactures 50%, consumer goods 31%, capital goods and equipment 19%; partners—EC 30%, CEMA 45%, less developed countries 14%, US 5%, other 6%
- Imports: $13.8 billion (c.i.f., 1988); commodities—raw materials and semimanufactures 79%, capital goods and equipment 15%, consumer goods 6%; partners—EC 30%, CEMA 45%, less developed countries 14%, US 5%, other 6%
- External debt: $17.0 billion, medium and long term (1989)
- Electricity: 21,000,000 kW capacity; 87,100 million kWh produced, 3,650 kWh per capita (1989)

=== GDP per capita of republics and autonomous provinces ===
Indexed GDP per capita by federal unit
Federal unit	1953	1955	1960	1965	1970	1975	1980	1985	1989
SR Slovenia	161.1	174.9	180.4	183.2	193.7	205.3	200.5	203.1	199.0
SR Croatia	115.4	122.5	119.2	120.3	123.6	123.1	125.6	125.3	125.6
SAP Vojvodina	99.4	93.6	107.9	112.5	107.4	115.1	113.5	117.8	119.0
SR Serbia	96.8	90.8	96.4	96.3	96.5	96.7	98.7	99.2	103.1
SR Montenegro	74.8	77.2	64.5	76.3	77.2	69.1	79.6	78.0	73.5
SR Bosnia and Herzegovina	85.7	83.3	76.0	71.7	67.6	65.8	65.6	68.7	67.9
SR Macedonia	68.0	68.4	63.9	66.6	70.0	68.0	66.3	64.2	65.7
SAP Kosovo	45.8	42.5	37.4	36.5	34.1	33.4	28.6	27.7	25.6

Exports by Commodity Groups in 1969
Commodity Group	Millions of USD (1970)	Percentage
Food, Drink and Tobacco	289	19.61%
Raw Materials	142	9.63%
Chemicals	91	6.17%
Base Metals	208	14.11%
Other Semi-Manufactures	223	15.13%
Machinery	165	11.19%
Ships	101	6.85%
Other manufactured materials	237	16.08%
Other	18	1.22%

=== GDP per capita of major cities ===
Indexed GDP per capita of major cities
City	Residents (1991 Census)	GDP Index (Yugoslavia=100)	Republic
Belgrade	1,168,454	145	SR Serbia
Zagreb	706,770	212	SR Croatia
Skopje	444,760	88	SR Macedonia
Sarajevo	416,497	139	SR Bosnia and Herzegovina
Ljubljana	267,008	251	SR Slovenia
Split	189,388	136	SR Croatia
Novi Sad	179,626	168	SR Serbia
Niš	175,391	107	SR Serbia
Rijeka	165,693	208	SR Croatia
Pristina	155,499	67	SR Serbia
Kragujevac	147,305	111	SR Serbia
Banja Luka	143,079	96	SR Bosnia and Herzegovina
Titograd	117,875	85	SR Montenegro
Osijek	104,761	139	SR Croatia
Maribor	103,961	195	SR Slovenia
Subotica	100,386	130	SR Serbia

== After the breakup of Yugoslavia ==
The dissolution of Yugoslavia and related Yugoslav Wars during the 1990s caused severe economic volatility for all former republics. The sudden loss of market share, free trade agreements, privatization, and fiscal mismanagement disrupted macroeconomic guidance in the region. Slovenia was the only economy to see positive economic growth during the initial shock. The secession of Croatia resulted in the most severe economic damage to dissolving Yugoslavia, estimated to be around $43 billion cumulatively by 1995. The largest economies of Yugoslavia were former Northern republics, namely Slovenia, Croatia, and Serbia; former Southern republics, Montenegro, North Macedonia, and Bosnia and Herzegovina; as well as the disputed Kosovo underwent nation-building. The two wealthiest former Yugoslav republics by GDP-per-capita – Slovenia and Croatia – later joined the European Union in 2004 and 2013, respectively.

== See also ==
- List of companies of the Socialist Federal Republic of Yugoslavia
- Hyperinflation in the Federal Republic of Yugoslavia (1992–94)

== Sources ==
- Patterson, Patrick Hyder (2011). Bought and Sold: Living and Losing the Good Life in Socialist Yugoslavia. Ithaca, New York: Cornell University Press. ISBN 978-0-8014-5004-4.
- Woodward, Susan L. (1995). Socialist Unemployment: The Political Economy of Yugoslavia, 1945–1990. Princeton, New Jersey: Princeton University Press. ISBN 978-0-691-21965-3.
