= NIS building =

Office building in Novi Sad, Serbia

- Зграда НИС-а; Zgrada NIS-a
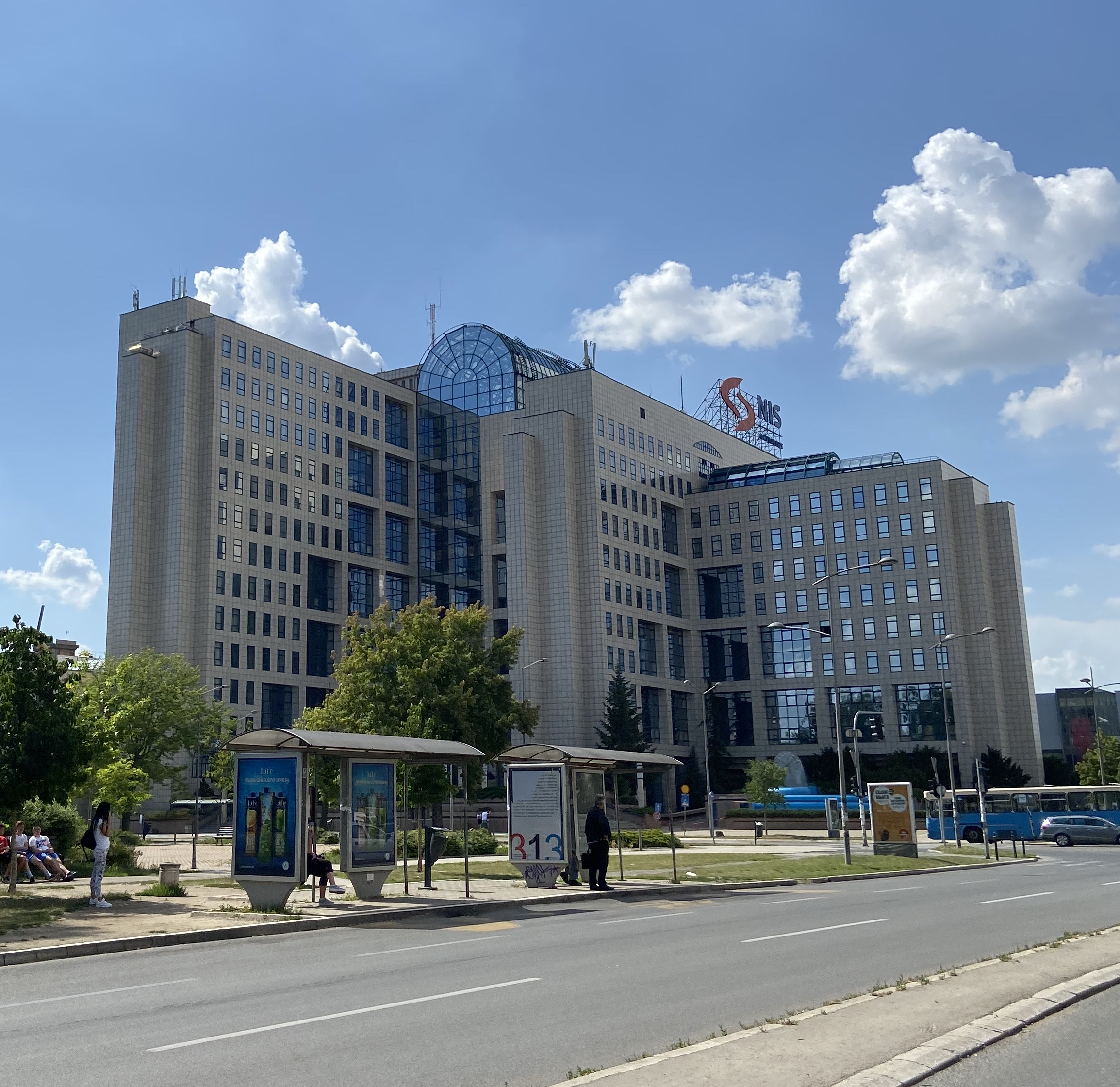
- NIS building
- Interactive map of the NIS building area
- Former names: NIS-Naftagas building

General information
- Status: Completed
- Location: Narodnog fronta 12, Novi Sad, Serbia
- Coordinates: 45°14′31.2″N 19°50′28.2″E
- Current tenants: Naftna Industrija Srbije
- Construction started: 1989
- Completed: 1998
- Opened: 1998; 28 years ago
- Owner: Naftna Industrija Srbije

Design and construction
- Architect: Aleksandar Keković
- Main contractor: Government of Serbia

The NIS building (Serbian Cyrillic: Зграда НИС-а, romanized: Zgrada NIS-a) is the headquarters building of Naftna Industrija Srbije (NIS), located in Novi Sad, Serbia.

== History ==
Location within Liman III

Construction started in 1989 and finished in 1998. The building is one of the landmarks of Novi Sad. It is located in the city quarter known as Liman III, across from Liman Park, on Narodnog Fronta Street and Bulevar oslobođenja.
