= Razvitak =

Razvitak logo

Razvitak was a prominent regional trading company founded after the World War II in Metković, Croatia, Yugoslavia.

== Background ==
Not long after the Partisans entered Metković on October 26, 1944, and with the arrival of the authorities of the then Democratic Federative Yugoslavia in December 1944, KOTNAPROD (District Procurement and Sales Company) was founded months later, the company turns into a branch of Zagreb's GLAVNOPROD (Main Purchasing and Sales Company of Croatia). In the same year, the Metkov branch became a General Trading Company.

== The foundation of Razvitak ==
The company Razvitak was founded by the decision of the Department of Economy of the Metković District People's Board No. 7550/47 dated April 23, 1947. The backbone of the business was retail food and industrial products for the needs of the people of the Metković District, and in the first year it employed 10 workers. Already the following year, the number was doubled, and in the first two years of operation, the scope of business was expanded, among other things, to catering, butchery, bakery, and transportation. Hospitality and transport became independent in 1950, and Razvitak continued its operations as a trading company with a warehouse and 12 stores and 60 employees. The transition from a distribution system to a system of free supply and demand in 1951 gave momentum to business. The independence of the retail companies continued in 1953 (then 6 companies), whereby Razvitak continued to operate as a wholesaler.

== Capital facilities ==
From the very beginning, Razvitak had a representative office in Zagreb, and later representative offices were opened in Belgrade, Sarajevo and Ljubljana. Apart from Croatia, shops existed all over SFR Yugoslavia, and especially in Bosnia and Herzegovina. Procurement was carried out in Slavonic, northwestern Croatia, Dalmatia and Slovenia, and sales were mainly focused on Dalmatia, the Zagreb region, Slovenia, Bosnia and Herzegovina and Montenegro.

Self-service as an important step in retailing was opened for the first time in Croatia in Ivanec in 1956, and Razvitak opened its first supermarket in Metković in 1962 (in today's Stjepana Radić Street, across the street from the park), after which numerous supermarkets were opened in the surrounding towns, on the coast and in the Herzegovina. Shops in places by the sea were particularly successful and contributed to the development of tourism at that time.

The continuation of the expansion of the Razvitak retail network was the construction of the first department store in Mostar, on the right bank of the Neretva, which was started in 1968 according to the project of Ante Paljaga, the designer of the then GP Vranica from Sarajevo, which built it.

Thanks to the success of the department store in Mostar, the management of Razvitak makes a decision to build the first department store in Metković. The project envisaged three phases. In the first, a department store and a tavern would be built, in the second a hotel with a capacity of 160 beds, the catering facilities of which would be part of the first phase, thus meeting the needs of both the department store and the hotel, and in the third, a multifunctional hall, trim cabinet and sports grounds for rest and relaxation would be built recreation. Only the first phase was realized, and a conceptual project was made for the second. The planned construction area was 12,000 m2.

The construction of the department store began in 1979 with the laying of the foundation stone and lasted until the middle of 1981. The conceptual project was the work of architects Ante Paljaga and Slobodan Kovač. Like the department store in Mostar, the department store in Metković is characterized by elements of the local climate, in this case the roof structure, which is in the form of two inverted Neretva ships. The construction was entrusted to GP Tehnogradnja from Split. The project envisaged 4,500 m2 of sales and 1,500 m2 of storage space. The official opening was held on July 27, 1981. In the beginning, it had about 100 workers, and eventually over 150. Not long after its opening, the catering part of the Tavern was opened, first the part on the first floor, and later the hall on the second floor. It employed about 15 workers. A night club was planned on the third floor, but it never opened.

Further expansion of activities into tourism led to the construction of the Klek Tourist Village with a total capacity of 531 beds. It consisted of a high category B hotel with a capacity of 93 beds, 52 five-bed bungalows, 32 three-bed bungalows, 6 one-story villas with 4 apartments with 3 beds each and one villa with 5 beds. The common facilities consisted of a restaurant with 160 seats, a self-service restaurant with 150 seats, a terrace with a capacity of 400 seats, a coffee bar - pastry shop, a disco club, a shop, a souvenir shop, sports fields, a clinic, etc. The construction was entrusted to GP Beton from Metković, and the opening took place on July 12, 1986.
