= Naftna Industrija Srbije =

Petroleum company in Serbia

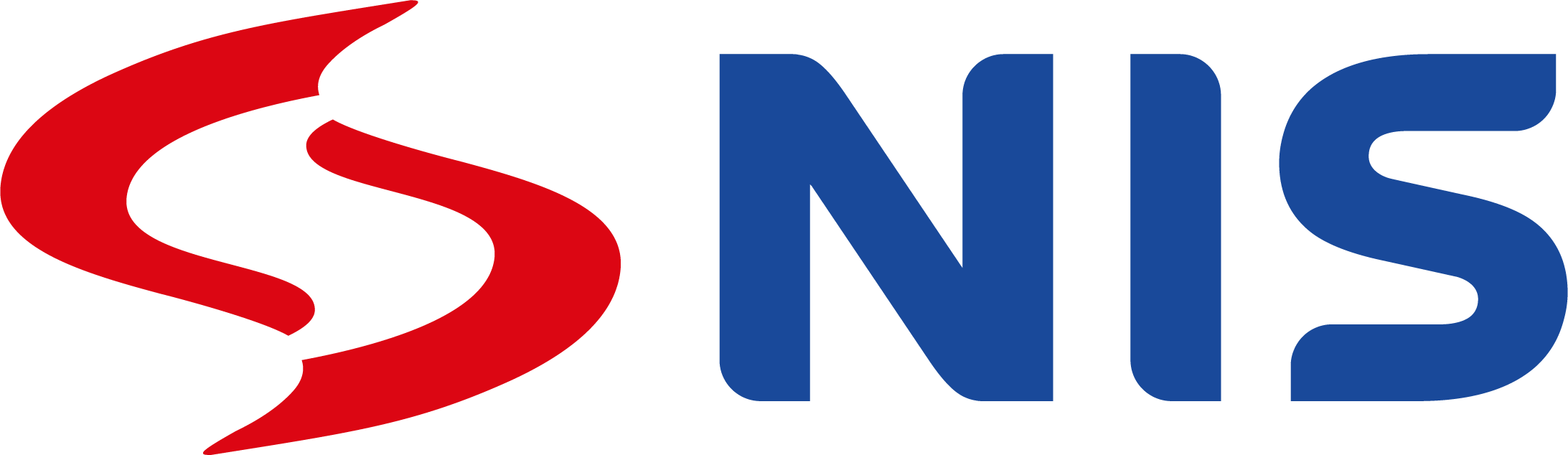

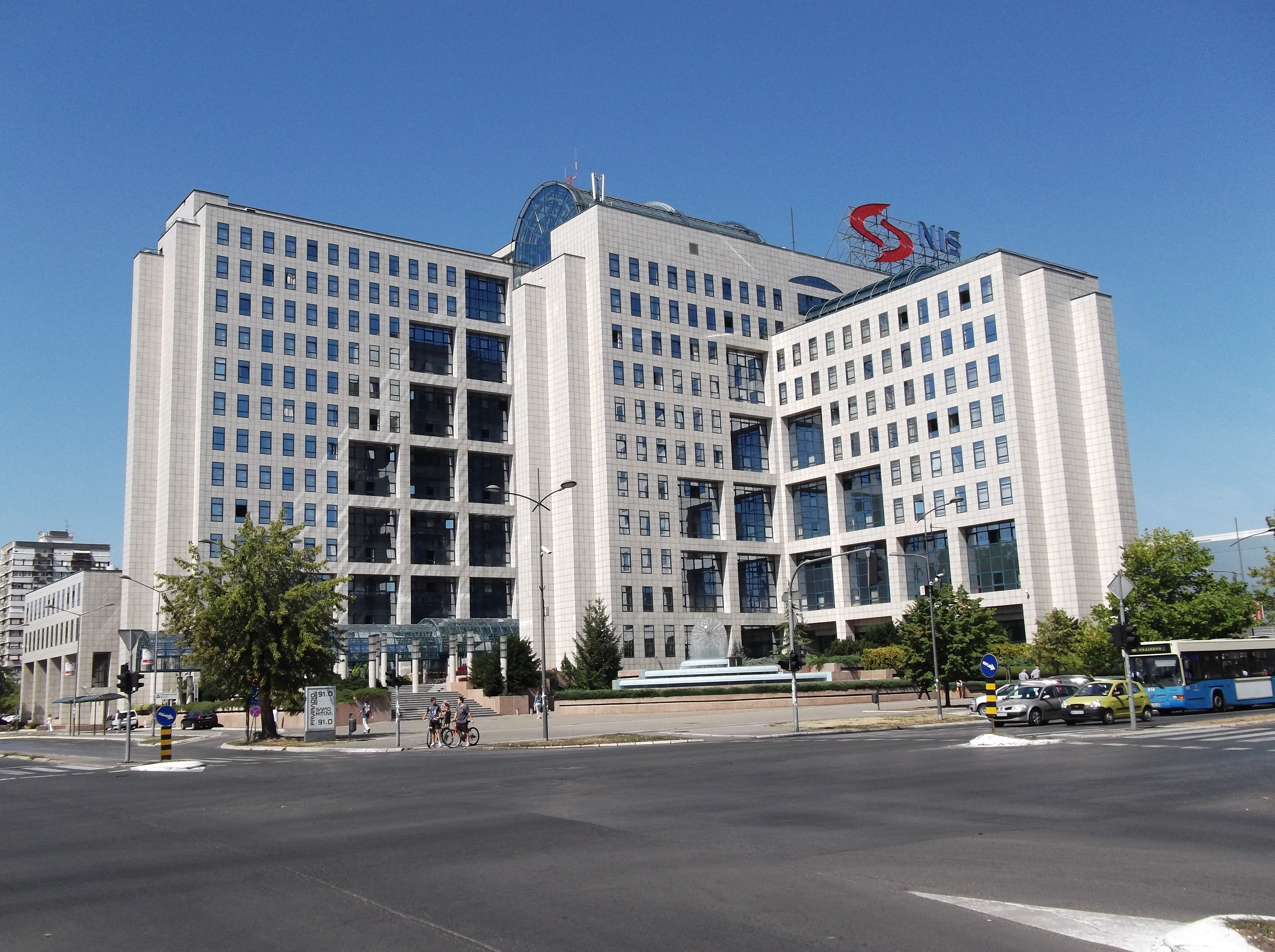
- NIS headquarters in Novi Sad
- Native name: Нафтна индустрија Србије
- Formerly: Naftagas (1949–1991)
- Type: Public
- Traded as: BELEX: NIIS
- Industry: Oil and gas
- Founded: 1949; 77 years ago (as Naftagas)
- Headquarters: Novi Sad, Serbia
- Key people: Vadim Yakovlev (Chairman); Kirill Tyurdenev (General director)
- Products: Petroleum; Natural gas Petrochemicals
- Services: Filling stations
- Revenue: ▼€2.47 billion (2025)
- Net income: ▼€-47.7 million (2025)
- Total assets: ▼€3.96 billion (2025)
- Total equity: ▼€3.07 billion (2025)
- Owner: Gazprom Neft (44.85%); Government of Serbia (29.87%); Intelligence JSC (11.30%); Others
- Number of employees: 5,273 (2025)
- Website: nis.rs

Naftna Industrija Srbije (Serbian Cyrillic: Нафтна Индустрија Србије, lit. 'Petroleum Industry of Serbia'; abbr. NIS / НИС) is a Serbian multinational oil and gas company with headquarters in NIS building, Novi Sad, Serbia. NIS is one of the most profitable companies in Serbia and one of the largest domestic exporters, employing 5,273 people (as of 2025) in Serbia. As of September 2025, Gazprom Neft is the largest shareholder with 44.85% of NIS shares, followed by 29.87% owned by the Government of Serbia, 11.30% owned by Intelligence JSC and the rest by minority shareholders.

The main activities of the company are exploration, production and refining of petroleum and natural gas, sales and distribution of a broad range of petroleum and gas products, as well as the implementation of energy and petrochemical projects. The main NIS production facilities are in the Republic of Serbia, while subsidiaries and representative offices have been established in Bosnia and Herzegovina, Bulgaria, Romania, Russia and Angola. NIS is Serbia's only oil refiner and supplies about 80% of the fuel consumed in the country.

== History ==
=== 1949–1991: Naftagas ===
The precursor of today's NIS was the "Oil Exploration and Production Company" with headquarters in Zrenjanin, founded in 1949 by the decision of the government of the Federal People's Republic of Yugoslavia (FPRY). The "Company for Oil Exploration and Production Naftagas" was established in 1953 pursuant to the decision of the government of FPRY, when management was relocated to Novi Sad. During the 1950s, first petrol stations and warehouses in this area were opened. Oil refineries in Pančevo and Novi Sad were put into operation in 1968. At the end of 1973, sales and distribution organizations "Jugopetrol-Beograd" and "Jugopetrol-Novi Sad" were integrated into the company.

=== 1991–2008: Naftna Industrija Srbije ===
Naftna industrija Srbije (NIS), in its present form, was established in 1991 as a public company for the exploration, production, refining and sales and distribution of oil, petroleum products and natural gas. The company gave rise to three present-day companies: NIS, Srbijagas, and "Transnafta". In October 2005, NIS was transformed into a joint-stock company, appointing its own Shareholders’ Assembly, Board of Directors and other managing bodies.

=== 2008–present: Gazprom ownership ===
==== 2008–2022 ====
In 2008, the Russian company Gazprom Neft became the majority shareholder, pursuant to the "Sales and Purchase Agreement" between the Republic of Serbia and the Russian Federation on the purchase of 51% of shares for €400 million and €550 million in investments until 2012. Adjoining contracts signed with Gazprom were about inclusion of Serbia in the South Stream gas-pipeline project and the construction of an underground gas storage facility in Banatski Dvor. On 24 December 2008, final contract between the Government of Serbia and Gazprom were signed.

In January 2010, about 20% of remaining shares of NIS were distributed by the Serbian government to the Serbian citizens. In June 2010, NIS was transformed into an open joint-stock company, and is listed on the Belgrade Stock Exchange since 30 August 2010. In March 2011, Gazprom Neft announced that it will purchase an additional 5.15% of shares of NIS, increasing their original share from 51% to 56%. NIS held a monopoly on all oil imports in Serbia until 2011.

In accordance with its strategy of becoming a regional leader, in 2011 NIS started to expand its business rapidly in the region. Subsidiary companies were established in Bosnia and Herzegovina, Bulgaria, Hungary and Romania.

In 2012 the construction of hydrocracking and hydrotreatment facilities (MHC/DHT) was completed in Pančevo Oil Refinery, marking the completion of the first stage of modernization of NIS refining facilities.

Two years later, in 2013, the realization of the cogeneration project began (production of electric and thermal energy from gas obtained from oil and gas fields in Serbia). The first cogeneration facility was commissioned in Sirakovo, after which another 13 mini power plants were put into operation. The surplus of electric energy, produced by NIS, is since then sold on the free market. The company strives towards constant implementation of new technologies, thus in 2016 an Amin Plant for the purification of natural gas started operating within the Plant for the preparation and transport of oil and gas in Elemir. The second stage of the Pančevo Oil Refinery modernization has begun in 2017 with the construction of the bottom-of-the-barrel plant with delayed coking technology, with the intent to make Pančevo Oil Refinery one of the most modern in Eastern Europe.

==== 2022–present ====
In May 2022, the ownership structure was changed, with Gazprom Neft transferring 6.15% of shares to Gazprom, to avoid international sanctions on oil embargo introduced as reaction to the Russian invasion of Ukraine. The sanctions however came into effect in December 2022 when the supply of Russian crude oil through the Adria oil pipeline from Croatia ceased. Non-Russian oil could still be imported through the pipeline. As of 2025, the company had 5,273 employees and €2.47 billion in revenue.

On 9 June 2023, NIS acquired additional stakes in HIP-Petrohemija LLC Pancevo from Serbia so that it holds the majority with 90%. The European Commission approved the merger in September 2022.

On 10 January 2025 United States announced sanctions on NIS which were meant to take place on 28 February. On 15 January 2025, Belgrade Stock Exchange halted all trading on NIS stocks for next 13 days, as a consequence of announced sanctions by the United States. The introduction of the sanctions was delayed multiple times before coming into effect on 9 October 2025. The sanctions stopped crude-oil deliveries through the Adria oil pipeline, NIS's only import route. The resulting supply interruption caused the Pančevo refinery to suspend production for 36 days, the production resumed in January 2026 after OFAC issued a temporary operating license.

In September 2025, Gazprom transferred an 11.3% interest in NIS from PJSC Gazprom to Intelligence JSC, a company managed by Gazprom Capital, while PJSC kept one NIS share.

In January 2026, it was announced that MOL Group had agreed to acquire Gazprom Neft’s 56.15 per cent shareholding in Naftna Industrija Srbije through a heads of agreement. The transaction, which remained subject to regulatory approvals, would result in MOL obtaining majority control of the company.

On 21 October 2026 the Serbian finance minister Siniša Mali announced that MOL Group had signed an agreement to purchase Gazprom's controlling stake in NIS. Mali also mentioned that the Serbian Government's stake in NIS would increase from 30% to 35%. MOL Group has denied Mali's claims and said there had been no change regarding the transaction.

During an interview with Telex.hu the Minister of Foreign Affairs of Hungary Anita Orbán stated she expected the MOL Group acquisition to get finalized by 11 December 2026. On 5 November 2026 the Office of Foreign Assets Control issued a license to MOL and MOL Serbia Investment Kft. which lasts until 28 February 2027 that authorises certain transactions necessary to transfer Russian-origin securities to MOL Serbia Investment Kft.

== Operations ==
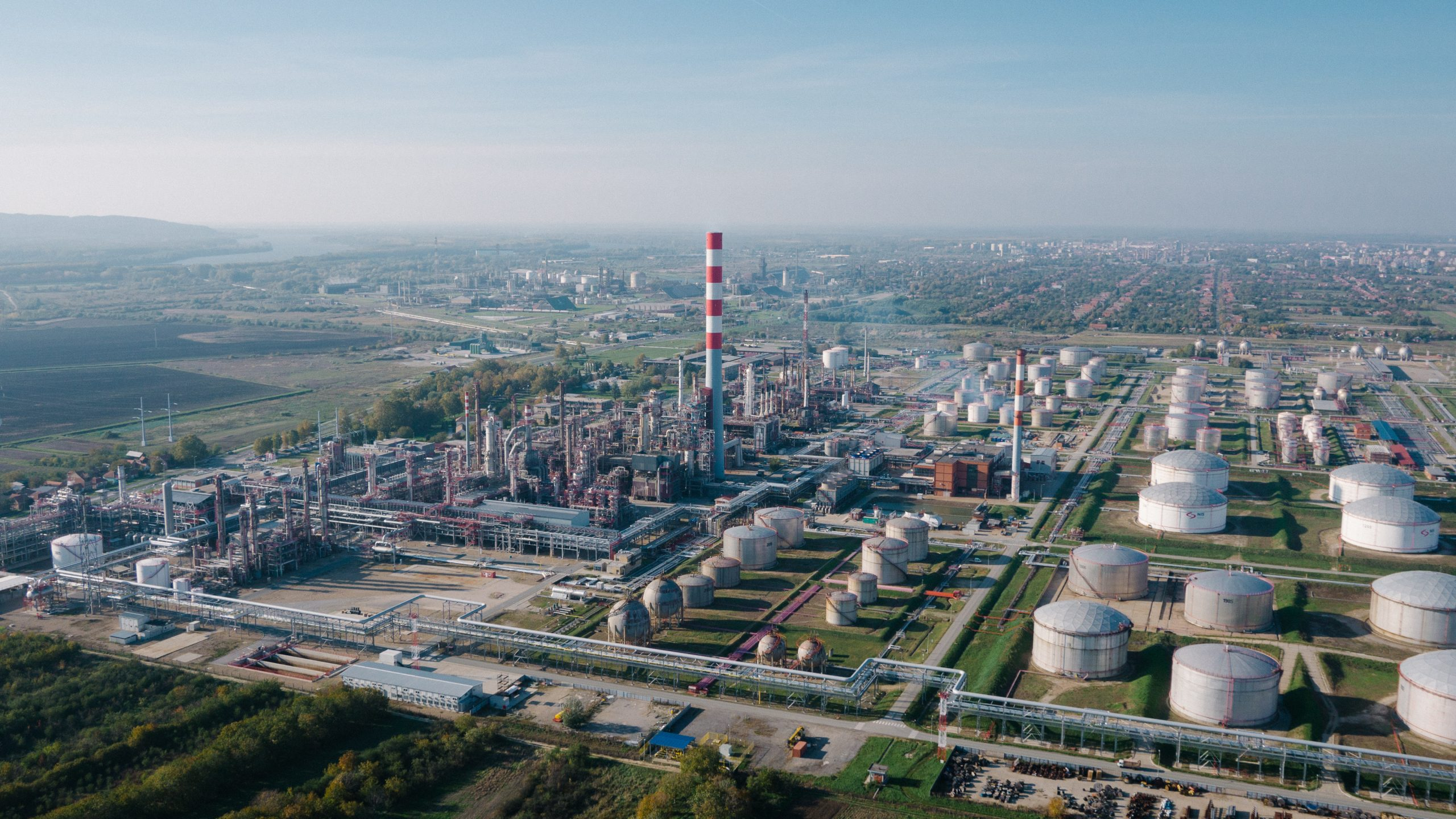
NIS refinery in Pančevo

=== Exploration and production ===
NIS is the only company in Serbia which deals with exploration and production of crude oil and gas, as well as with production of geothermal energy. The company disposes with all necessary equipment for the performance of a whole range of complex activities such as geophysical exploration, control of production of crude oil, gas and geothermal energy. The majority of NIS oil fields are located on the territory of Serbia, in the province of Vojvodina, but upstream has business operations both in Serbia and abroad. In 2011 NIS started to expand business in south-east Europe: in Bosnia and Herzegovina, Romania and Hungary.

=== Energy ===
NIS is engaged in the production of electrical and thermal energy from traditional and renewable resources, the production and sale of compressed natural gas, sale of natural gas, trade of electrical energy, development and implementation of strategically important energy projects, as well as the projects for improving energy efficiency. In terms of electric energy trade, NIS is present on the markets of Serbia, Bosnia and Herzegovina, Romania, Slovenia and Hungary, as well as North Macedonia.

=== Refining ===
The company owns and operates oil refineries in Pančevo (annual capacity of 4.8 million tons of crude oil) and Novi Sad (annual capacity of 2.6 million tons of crude oil), and natural gas refinery in Elemir. NIS refining complex produces a whole range of petroleum products – from motor gasoline and diesel fuel to mechanical lube oils and feedstock for the petrochemical industry, heavy fuel oil, road and industrial bitumen, etc.

Pančevo Oil Refinery produces motor fuel in accordance with Euro 5 standard, aviation fuel, liquid petroleum gas, petrochemical products, fuel oil, bitumen and other petroleum products. In 2017, Pančevo Oil Refinery was the first Serbian energy company to obtain the IPPC certificate (integrated certificate) from the state authorities on the integrated pollution prevention and control, confirming that the production process in the Refinery is fully compliant with the highest domestic and European standards in environmental protection.

NIS also offers services of crude refining to third parties.

=== Sales and distribution ===
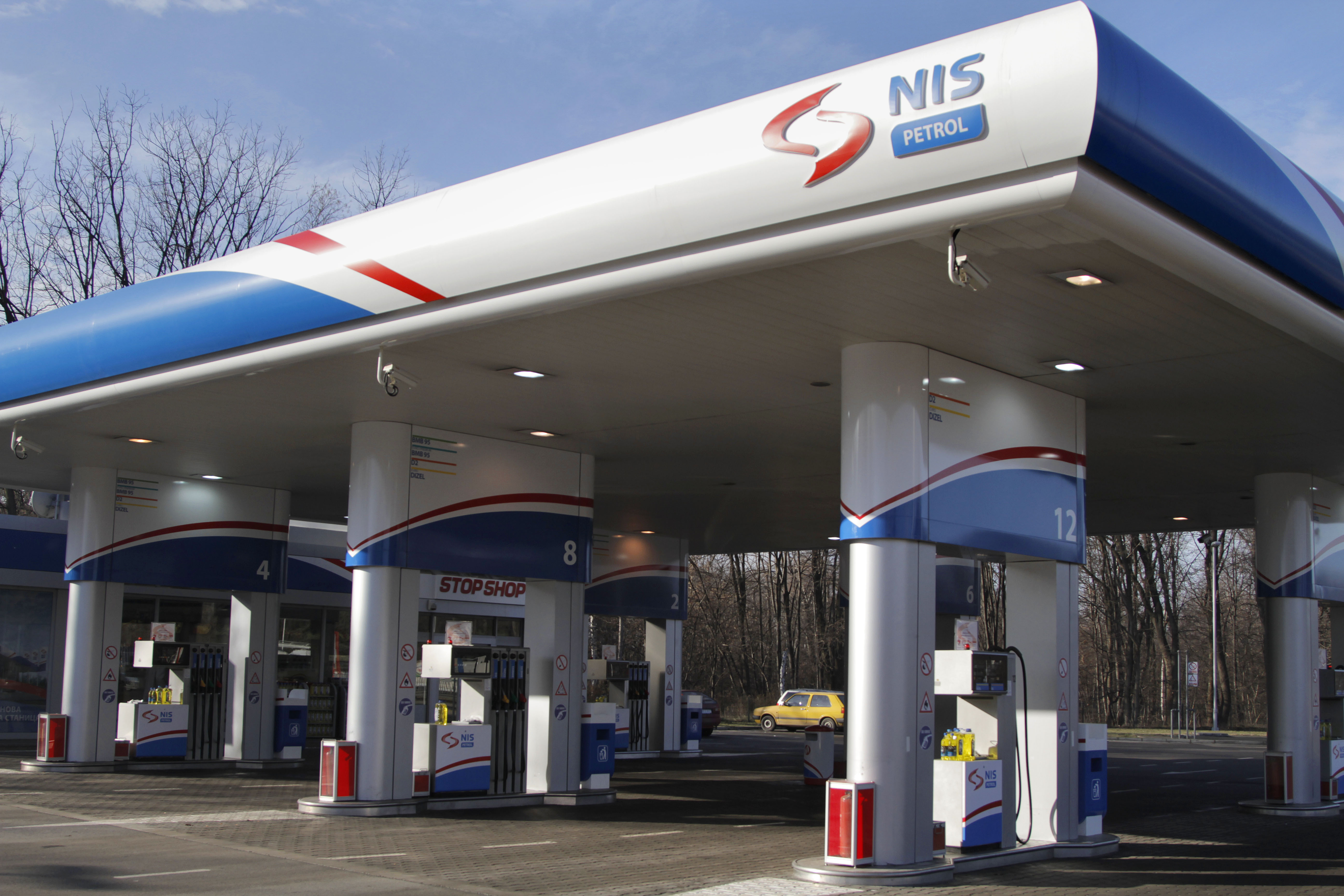
NIS Petrol filling station in Belgrade

Sales and distribution in NIS includes foreign and domestic trade, retail of petroleum and other related products, as well as the wholesale of petroleum products. NIS develops aviation fuel supply, bunkering, lubricants and bitumen sale and distribution as separate businesses. As of 2019, NIS has two retail brands on the market: NIS Petrol (mass consumption brand) and GAZPROM (premium brand).

In 2010 NIS started a program of modernization of the retail network. First re-branded gas station "Zmaj 2" with the brand NIS Petrol on the highway in Belgrade was opened 13 January 2012. In November 2012, NIS acquired 100% of OMV subsidiary operations in Bosnia and Herzegovina and its network of 28 filling stations.

In December 2012, NIS opened the first petrol station under the Gazprom brand in Serbia, and subsequently in Romania (the same month), and in Bulgaria (in July 2013). As of 31 December 2016, NIS with 324 filling stations was the largest petroleum company in Serbia in terms of market network.

As of 2025, NIS owns the largest network of filling stations in Serbia, a total of 328 filling stations, including loading terminals, LPG bottle shops, warehouses, aviation fuel pumping facility at Belgrade Nikola Tesla Airport and a network of depots across Serbia. Retail network for LPG retail includes all the regional sales centers in major cities in the country.

=== Services ===
NIS has its own service capacities which fully meet the company's needs and can render services to third parties. NIS provides services by means of subsidiary companies "NAFTAGAS-Oilfield Services", "NAFTAGAS-Technical services" and "NAFTAGAS-Transport".

== Market and financial data ==
Naftna Industrija Srbije finished the 2018 calendar year as the third biggest Serbian gross exporter with 465 million euros worth of exports. As of 8 March 2019, Naftna Industrija Srbije has a market capitalization of 987.50 million euros.

== Corporate social responsibility ==
The company has defined several social responsibility corporate programs:

- Energy of Sport – NIS has sponsored several sports teams in Serbia including: OK Vojvodina, KK Partizan, Serbia Davis Cup team, Children's mini-basket league, clubs supported by NIS Unions where employees are involved, and others.
- Culture Without Borders, which supports cultural institutions, national and international festivals and projects of Russian-Serbian cooperation. NIS cooperates with the Belgrade Philharmonic Orchestra, FEST (Belgrade), Guča Trumpet Festival, Nisville Jazz festival, Sterijino Pozorje Festival, Zmaj Children's Games, and the Joy of Europe Festival.
- Science and Talent Development program, which supports the development of scientific potential research, scientific discoveries, development of talented pupils and students. NIS supports Petnica Science Center and cooperates with University of Belgrade and University of Novi Sad. Cooperation includes student scholarships, internships at the company, additional specialization of company employees, gaining new know-how, and realization of mutual scientific research projects.
- Charity projects, which includes help to the most disadvantaged categories of citizens, one-time assistance to the injured, assistance to small organizations and associations which have good ideas but lack of funding, fuel donations in charity programs, etc. Some charity projects NIS has supported include construction of the Safe House in Pančevo, support for renovation of Hilandar monastery and help in the form of 100 litres of drinking water Jazak to the city of Kraljevo (Serbia) after the devastating 2010 Serbia earthquake.
- Cooperation for Development, which is implemented in regions NIS does business in. Agreements are signed in the following cities: Novi Sad, Belgrade, Niš, and with municipalities and cities in Vojvodina: Pančevo, Kikinda, Zrenjanin, Kanjiža, Novi Bečej.

NIS published its first sustainability report for 2010. NIS was the first company in Serbia to publish this report in accordance with the world standards Global Reporting Initiative (GRI-G3) and AA1000 APS (2008).

== Controversies ==
In 2012, NIS was accused by the Naftagas Union of mismanaging employees by forcing furloughs on some employees and keeping others as employees while not allowing them to work.

== See also ==
- NIS building
- List of companies of Serbia
- List of companies of the Socialist Federal Republic of Yugoslavia
