= Automotive industry in Croatia =

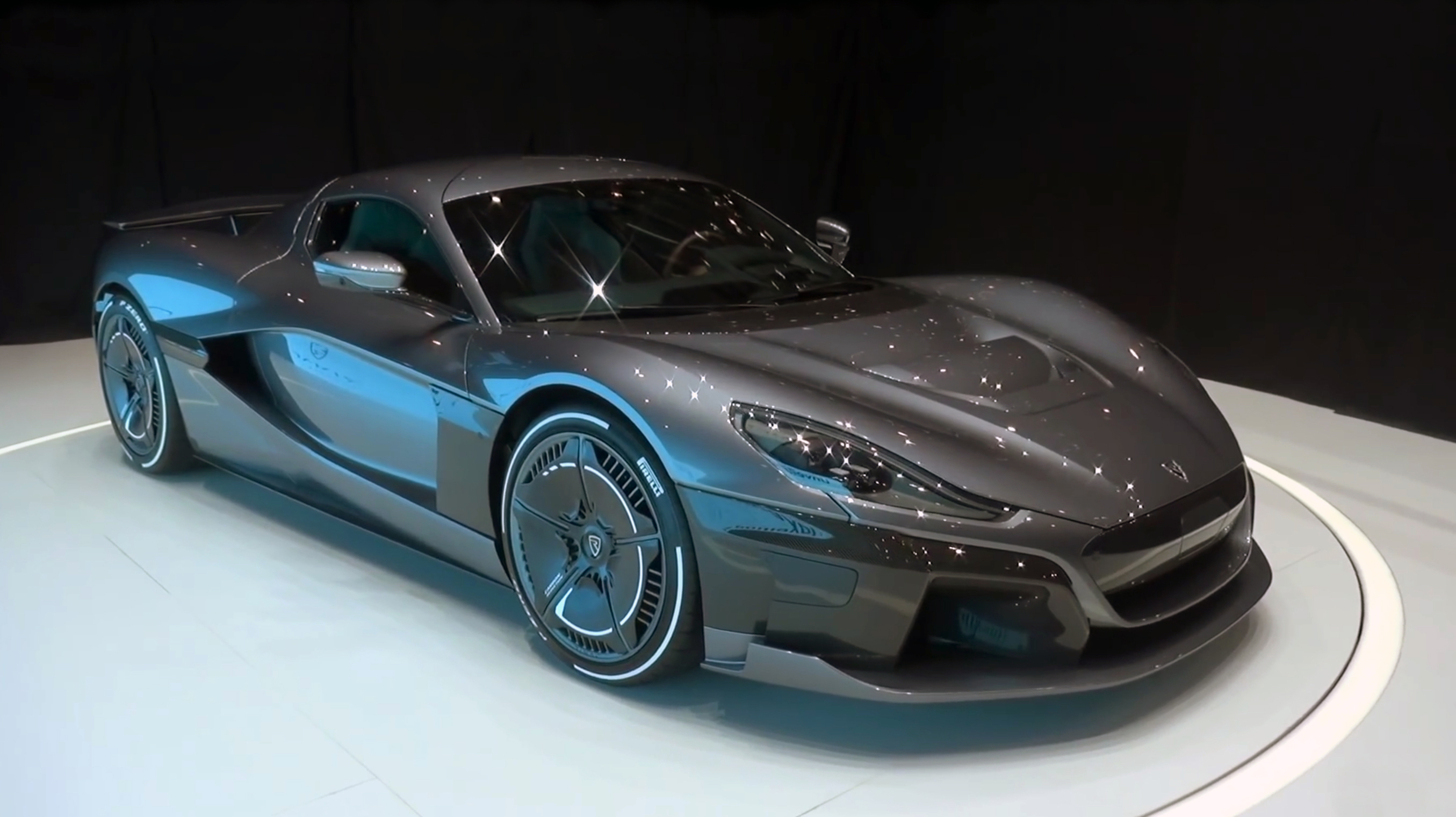
Rimac Automobili, one of Croatia’s major automotive manufacturers.

The automotive sector of Croatia is an important part of the Croatian economy and the country's national manufacturing base. This industry is closely tied to the broader European automotive industry as Croatia's largest export market for both hardware and software. The Croatian automotive sector maintains a labour force of 10,000 within 130 companies. It cumulatively generates $600 million in annual revenue as of 2019. Two years prior, in 2017, it was estimated that the industry accounted for 1.8% of all Croatian exports with 90% of industry profits attributable to foreign exports.

With a diversified supply chain and network of manufacturers, major Croatian car manufacturers include DOK-ING and Rimac Automobili. These companies are integrated into the global supply chain with manufactures such as AD Plastik and Lipik Glass producing for a variety of European and Japanese automobile conglomerates.

== History ==
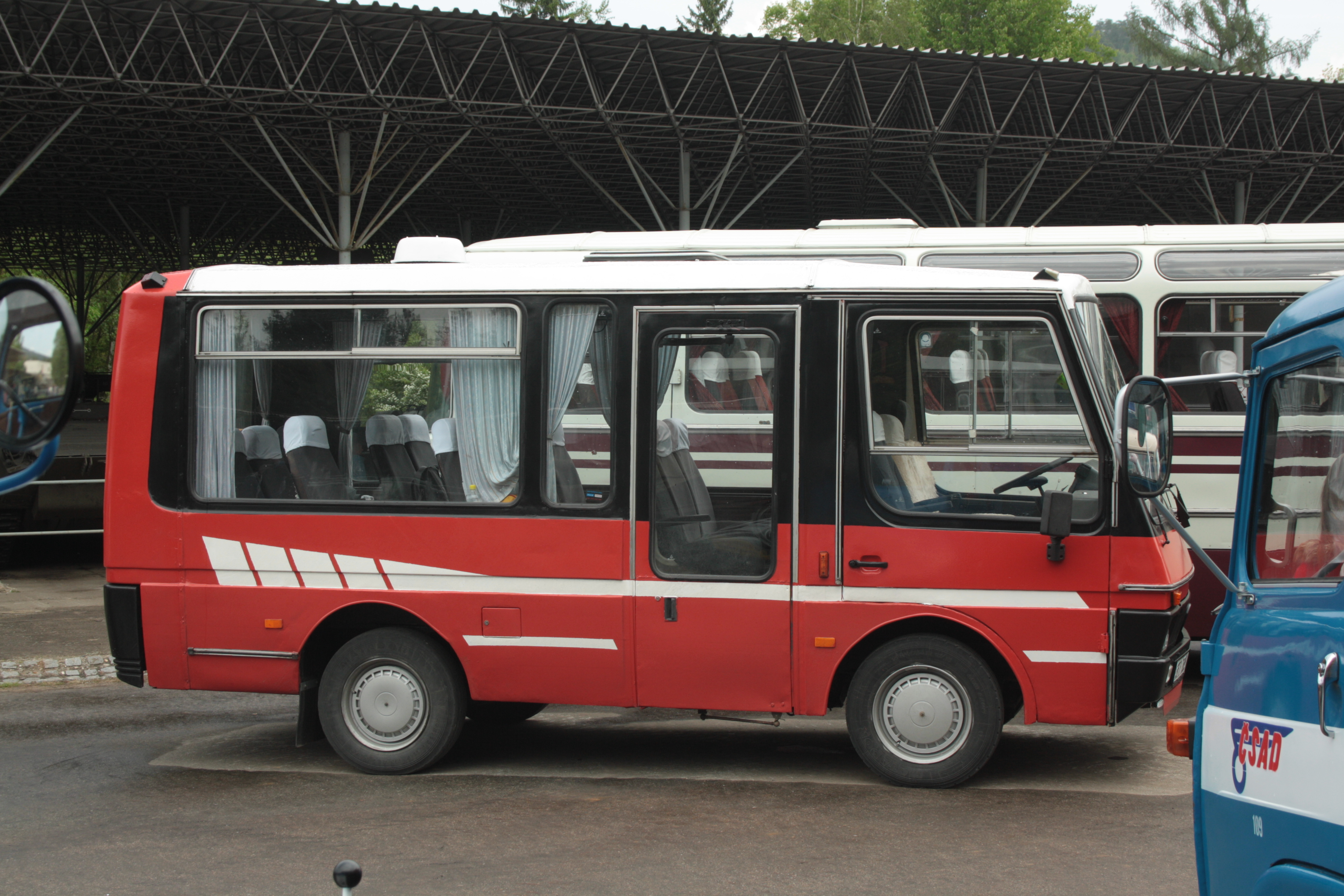
A TAZ Neretva II in the Czech Republic, in 2010

Between and after the two World Wars, a number of automotive companies and manufacturing plants emerged: Tvornica motora Zagreb (TMZ) and Tvornica Autobusa Zagreb (TAZ), both based in Zagreb.

Tvornica Autobusa Zagreb started producing buses and trucks in 1930. In 1980, the factory employed 1,200 people and produced an average of 500–600 vehicles (up to 900) yearly. Buses were exported to China, Finland, Egypt and other countries. The company also produced motorcycles until it went defunct in 2000. Other companies, such as Đuro Đaković have been producing military vehicles, such as M-95 Degman tank and LOV-1 armored vehicle. The company also manufactured Patria AMV vehicles under license. Rijeka-based vehicle manufacturer Torpedo produced military trucks, used in Croatian War of Independence during the 90s.

In 1992 and 1994 two companies, Zlatko and Kwadi both created a single car each. Zlatko's prototype: the Kosmopolit in 1994 was damaged during shipping and was abandoned. The Kwađi CR3 is considered to be the first Croatian car. Restaurant and brewery owner IPIM d.o.o. launched a truck based on the Kia K2700 in 2003. Croatia produced its first electric city concept car DOK-ING Loox in 2012. In 2013, Croatian bus manufacturer CROBUS signed a €280 million deal to produce and export 2,000 buses to Iraq, with the first buses delivered in the same year. The first DOK-ING car was sold to the Zagreb Faculty of Engineering. In 2015, the company produced two electric buses for the city of Koprivnica. In the following years, the company began producing a variety of electric vehicles such as communal vehicles, buses, mopeds and bikes for foreign markets.

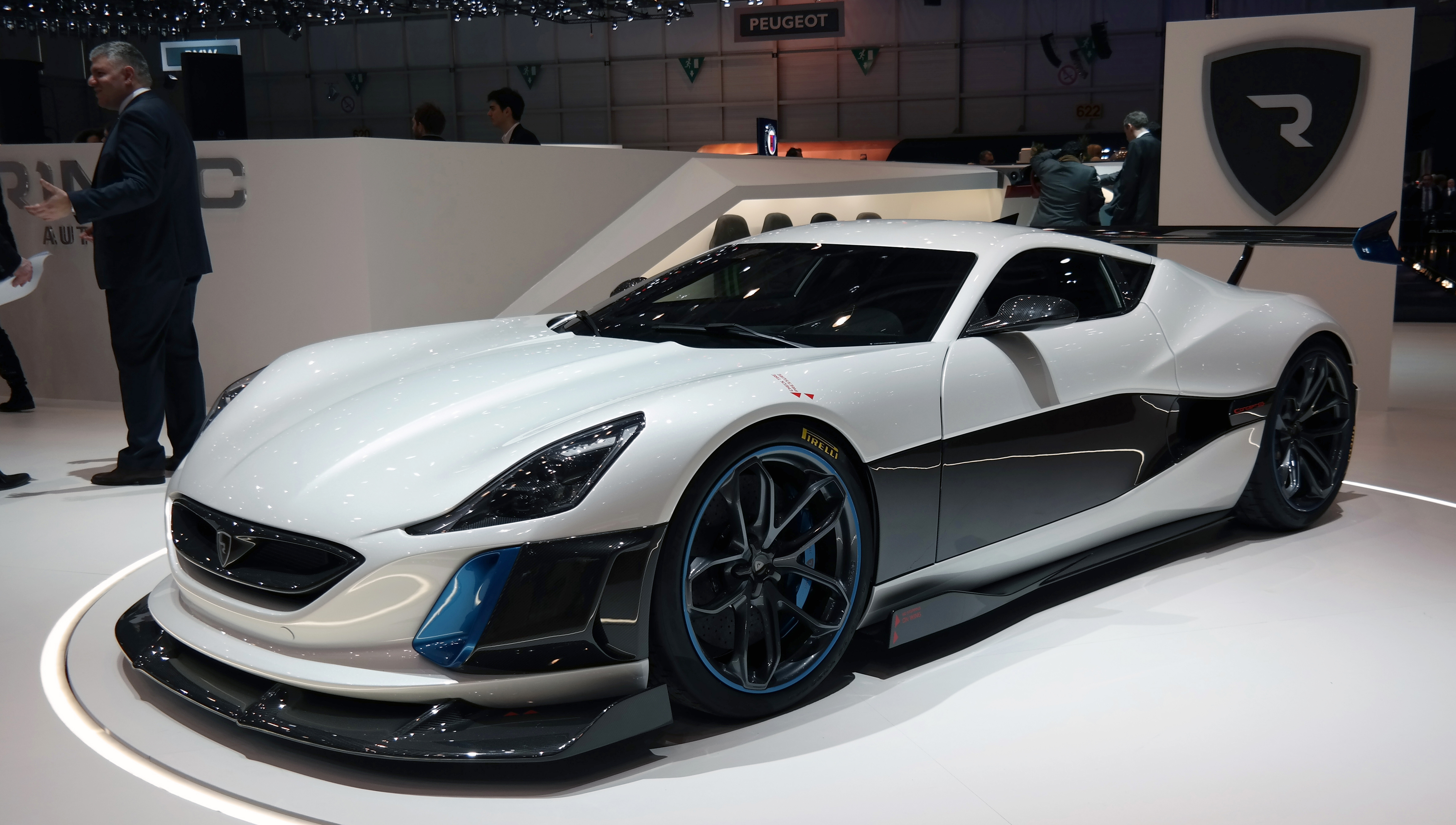
Rimac Concept S in 2016

The same year, privately owned Rimac Automobili produced Rimac Concept One, a two-seat high-performance electric sports car. Concept One has been described as the world's first electric supercar becoming the world's fastest accelerating electric automobile until 2015. The car was exported during the same year, and was the first car exported abroad in the country's history. As of 2016, all of the eight Concept Ones manufactured were sold. The company subsequently unveiled the improved Rimac Concept S at the 2015 Geneva Motor Show. The Rimac group also produces and manufactures engines and other electrical parts for other companies, such as the liquid cool battery pack for Koenigsegg, claimed as the most power-dense battery pack to date. In 2017, they were producing battery systems for Aston Martin. It also produces entire vehicles for other companies, such as the Applus Volar-E for Applus+ IDIADA.

== Manufacturers ==
- Rimac Automobili
- DOK-ING Automotiv
- Đuro Đaković
- CROBUS
- IPIM

=== Defunct ===
- Tvornica Autobusa Zagreb
- Zlatko
- Kwađi

== See also ==
- Industry in Croatia
- Economy of Croatia
