= TV1 (Bulgaria) =

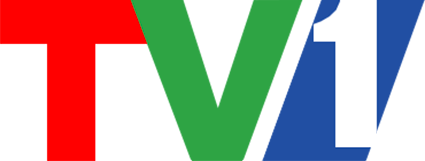
- Country: Bulgaria
- Broadcast area: Bulgaria
- Headquarters: Sofia, Bulgaria

Programming
- Language(s): Bulgarian
- Picture format: 16:9 SD/HD

Ownership
- Owner: Rumen Kovachev

History
- Launched: 2008
- Replaced: Estate TV

Links
- Website: tv1.bg

TV1 is a Bulgarian television channel and production company headquartered in Sofia, Bulgaria. It was founded in 2008 by Rumen Kovachev, replacing his previous channel, Estate TV. Its programming features newscasts, business news, political commentary, art and culture coverage, and variety shows.

== History ==
TV1 was founded by Rumen Kovachev in 1998 as a production company. It had the first private portable production unit in Bulgaria. Beyond producing TV1's original programming, the company has worked on television shows, sportscasts, and live events for others in Bulgaria and abroad. Some of its production work includes Bulgarian versions of various reality competition formats like Got Talent, The Voice, The Farm, and MasterChef, sportscasts of various national and international sports events, and musical concerts.

In 2005, Rumen Kovachev founded the Estate TV, a television channel focused on real estate and tourism. In 2008, Kovachev replaced Estate TV with the newly created TV1 channel, moving to producing and airing original programming focused on current affairs, political discussions, and newscasts. In 2017, the company moved to a newly constructed headquarters building, allowing for expanded production of original programming.

Following the controversial purchase of one of Bulgaria's two major private broadcast channels Nova by Georgi and Kiril Domuschiev in 2019, multiple journalists left under duress. In the months after the purchase, many of these journalists moved to TV1, creating and working on political news and commentary shows for the channel, most notably The Questions and The Alternative.

Following the death of the journalist Milen Tsvetkov in 2020, then host of The Alternative and a member of the journalistic team at The Questions, the street of the channel's headquarters was renamed after him.

The channel expanded into talk shows with the start of The Bobi Vaklinov Show in May of 2020 and On the Wall later that same year.

In 2021, TV1 entered into a strategic partnership with Bulsatcom, Bulgaria's largest satellite television operator, which included both offering the channel to their clients as well as the rights to resell ad space.

In 2023, the channel faced financial struggles after their renewed deal with Bulsatcom significantly lowered the operator's ad purchases for reselling, leading to a pause in production of its investigative journalism program The Questions. Bulsatcom denied responsibility for the show suspending production and clarified that they had not ended their contract with TV1.

== Programming ==
=== Current ===
- The Democracy (Демокрацията)
- The Day with Veselin Dremdzhiev (Денят с Веселин Дремджиев)
- The Comment (Коментарът)
- The Bobi Vaklinov Show (Шоуто на Боби Ваклинов)
- The Brands of Bulgaria (Брандовете на България)
- The Energy (Енергията)
- En Face (Анфас)
- The Young on TV1 (Младите по TВ1)
- Gallery (Галерия)
- The Path (Пътят)
- Sport on TV1 (Спорт по ТВ1)

=== Past ===
- The Questions (Въпросите)
- On the Wall (На стената)
- A Visit (Визита)
- The Registered Trademark Mario Gavrilov (Запазената марка Марио Гаврилов)
- Peaks (Върхове)
- My Street (Моята улица)
- The Alternative (Алтернативата)
