= Industry in Croatia =

Industry of Croatia

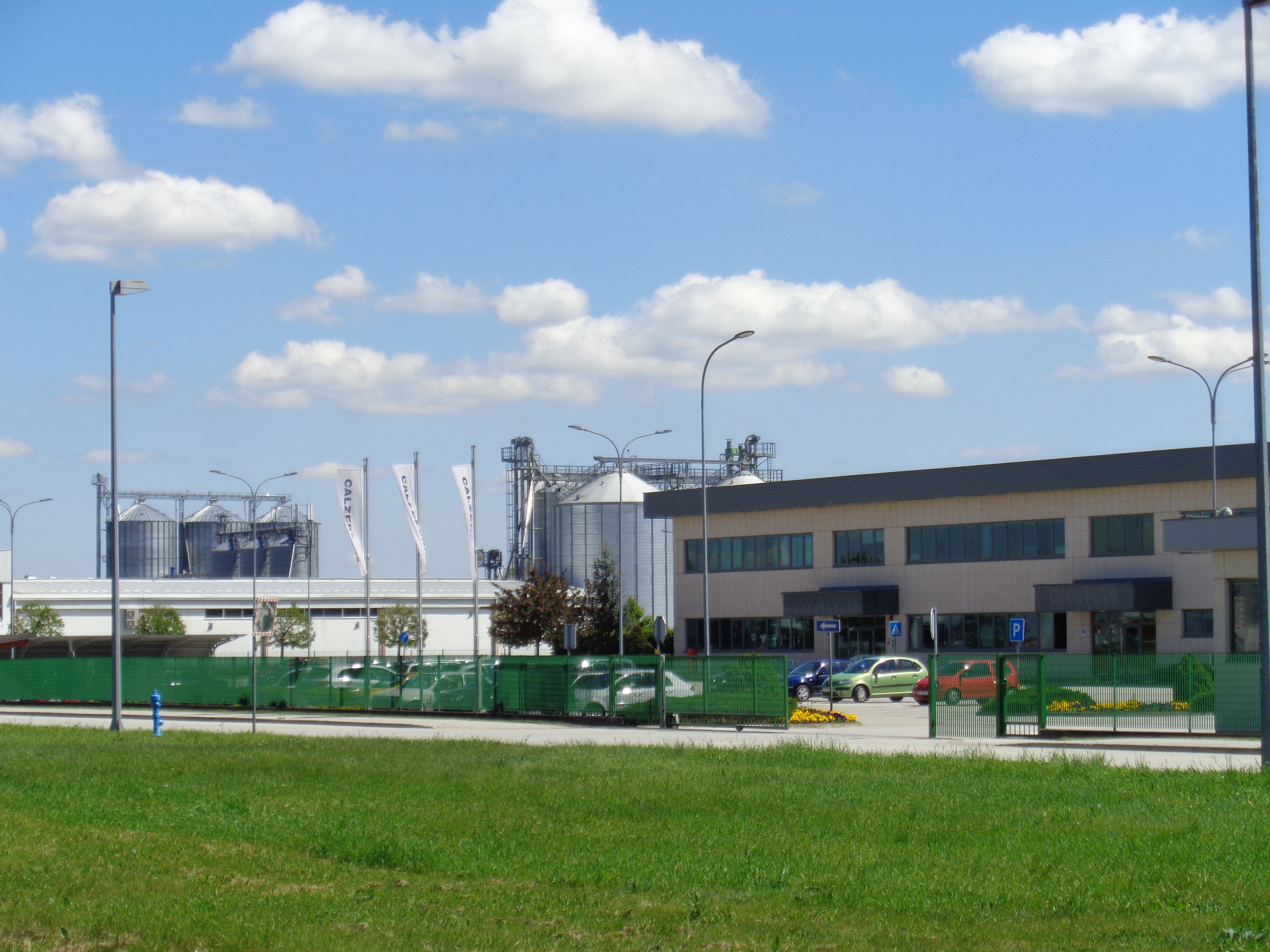

Čakovec-East Industrial Zone, Međimurje County, Northern Croatia
- Main industries: Machinery and equipment, shipbuilding, petrochemicals, electricity, electronics, wood industry and furniture, pharmaceuticals, food and beverages, cement and construction, chemical and plastics industry, textiles, footwear and leather production
- Industrial growth rate: -3.4% (2020)
- Labour force: 18.5% of total employment (2015)
- GDP of sector: 21.5% of total GDP (2020)

The industrial production of Croatia has historically played an important role in the country's economy. It has a longstanding tradition based since the 19th century on agriculture, forestry and mining. Many industrial branches developed at that time, like wood industry, food manufacturing, potash production, shipbuilding, leather and footwear production, textile industry, and others. It typically constitutes around 20% of overall economic output, with an average annual growth rate of 3-4%.

As of 2026, the main Croatian industrial sectors are food and beverage industry (24%), metal processing and machine industry, including vehicles (20%), coal coke and refined petroleum production (17%), chemical, pharmaceutical, rubber and plastics industry (11%), wood, furniture and paper manufacturing (9%), electrical equipment, electronics and optics fabrication (9%), textile, clothing and footwear industry (5%) as well as construction and building materials production (5%).

== Overview ==
Industrial production in Croatia has an important place in total production. It includes machinery, tools, various fabricated metal products, ships and boats, mineral oils and distillates, timber products, furniture and bed equipment, military hardware, clothing and footwear with accessories, cement, bricks and other building materials, etc. There is also a notable production in energy sector, mining and water supply.

During the process of transition (in the 1990s and later) many companies were closed down, or were damaged during the Croatian War of Independence. It happened mostly to firms of timber, metal and textile branches. Some industries, however, recovered and achieved later remarkable results. Significant production level has been reached in the construction and energy-related activities as well. The largest Croatian construction companies recently are Kamgrad d.o.o. Zagreb, Radnik d.d. Križevci and Ing-grad d.o.o. Zagreb. Some companies like Građevni kombinat 'Međimurje' d.d. Čakovec and Industrogradnja d.d. Zagreb ceased to exist.

A great number of companies has been very active in foreign trade. During the Great Recession, Croatian industry suffered from a decline of production output, revenue growth at a slower pace and increased unemployment. The share of industry in the whole economy sank from year to year; in 2010, for instance, industry accounted for 28.1% of activity. Negative trends were changed not earlier than in 2014, as the industrial production achieved a small rate of growth of 1.3% in comparison with the year before.

In period from 2014 to 2017 industry production grew by 10.8% with average annual growth of 2.7%. The annual growth rate of industry production in 2016 rose by 5%. The fastest growth of production in 2016 was recorded by electrical equipment production sector (22.2% in comparison with previous year). At the same time, some industrial branches generated decline of production. The share of labour force in industry in 2015 was 18.5% of overall employment in Croatia, showing at the same time trends with negative lines. In 2020 industry production fell by 3.4% in comparison with previous year. In the first half of 2021, industry production grew by 9.6% in comparison to the same period of the previous year.

== Industry by counties ==
The biggest industrial centres in Croatia are Zagreb, Rijeka, Split, Osijek and Varaždin. The share of industrial production output of Croatian counties ranges from over 20% in the City of Zagreb (followed by approx. 11% in Primorje-Gorski Kotar County, 8% in Zagreb County and Varaždin County) to only 0.5% in Lika-Senj County.

Countries with biggest share of industry in GDP in 2018 were Međimurje County (43.5%), Varaždin County (41.7%) and Krapina-Zagorje County (41.3%), while county with lowest share of industry was Dubrovnik-Neretva County (5.2%).

Share of industry in GDP of Counties of Croatia (% of GDP, 2018)

Share of industry in GDP of Counties of Croatia (% of GDP, 2018)
County	Share of industry in GDP
Bjelovar-Bilogora	20.7
Brod-Posavina	26.5
Dubrovnik-Neretva	5.2
Istria	18.6
Karlovac	30.9
Koprivnica-Križevci	30.1
Krapina-Zagorje	41.3
Lika-Senj	11.5
Međimurje	43.5
Osijek-Baranja	21.4
Požega-Slavonia	22.1
Primorje-Gorski Kotar	26.1
Sisak-Moslavina	30.8
Split-Dalmatia	11.0
Šibenik-Knin	15.2
Varaždin	41.7
Virovitica-Podravina	22.6
Vukovar-Syrmia	19.0
Zadar	11.1
Zagreb County	28.1
City of Zagreb	13.2
Source: Croatian Bureau of Statistics

Croatian industry's share of 21.2% of the country's 2015 GDP makes it the second largest sector of the economy after services. Its expected growth is based on larger consumption and foreign investments. Some of the significant investment projects into the energy and environmental protection sector have already been finalized lately.

== Industry production growth 2005–2020 ==
Year	2005	2006	2007	2008	2009	2010	2011	2012	2013	2014	2015	2016	2017	2018	2019	2020	2005-2020	Average annual growth
Growth (in %)	5.1	4.5	5.6	1.6	-9.2	-1.5	-1.2	-5.5	-2.0	1.3	2.7	5.0	1.9	-0.3	0.5	-3.4	5.1	0.3
Source: Croatian Bureau of Statistics

== Mines and smelters ==
As early as 1914 Tvonica Karbida I Ferolegura Dalmacija owned a ferrochromium smelter in Dugi Rat.

The Boris Kidric aluminum smelter at Šibenik was completely destroyed as a result of the war for independence that erupted in 1991.

== Gallery ==
Plomin Power Station, Istria County	Zagreb Flour Mill, City of Zagreb	Bakar industrial bulk cargo port facilities, Primorje-Gorski Kotar County	Brodotrogir Shipyard, Split-Dalmatia County	Aluminium castings factory in Čakovec, Međimurje County

== See also ==
- Economy of the European Union
- Economy of Croatia
- Industry of Romania
- Industry of Bulgaria
- Industry in Finland
- Automotive industry in Croatia
