= Industry in Bulgaria =

Industrial production

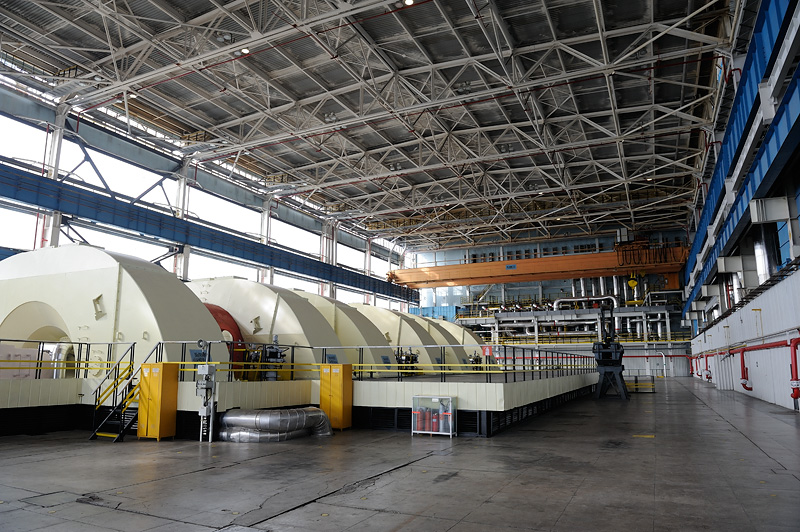

Kozloduy Nuclear Power Plant, the largest power plant in south-eastern Europe
- Main industries: Metallurgical industry, electricity, electronics, machinery and equipment, shipbuilding, petrochemicals, cement and construction, textiles, food and beverages, mining, tourism
- Industrial growth rate: 5.5% (2007)
- Labor force: 33.6% of total labor force
- GDP of sector: 31.3% of total GDP

Bulgaria is an industrialized nation with a developed heavy and light manufacturing industry. In 2007 industry accounted for 31.7% of the country's GDP. This makes industry the second-largest sector of the economy after services. In 2007, the sector employed 33.6% of the labour force.

== Overview ==
Bulgaria is among Europe's largest producers of lead, zinc and copper, and produces around ten percent of the world's hydraulic machinery. Other products include machine tools, caustic soda, nuclear energy, military hardware/munitions and many other finished and semi-finished products. The country is the largest electricity exporter in south-eastern Europe. About 14% of the total industrial production relates to machine building, and 20% of the workforce is employed in this field.

The country has conditions favourable to the development of industry. Bulgaria is located at the crossroads of Europe and Asia, which lends itself to international transport. The country has rich mineral resources, a skilled work force, a developed and improving transportation network and educational infrastructure, and a relatively stable political and economic climate.

Industry in Bulgaria can be traced back to 1833 when the Bulgarian industrialist Dobri Zhelyazkov opened the first modern factory in the Balkans at Sliven. The importance of industry dramatically increased during the Socialist period. In the era of economic planning, industrial production accounted for more than 50% of national GDP. The main market for Bulgarian manufactured goods was Comecon, the Communist economic organization (comparable to the EU).

== History ==
=== Before 1878 ===
The first factory in what is now Bulgaria was built by the industrialist Dobri Zhelyazkov in the town of Sliven, in 1833. It manufactured woollen textiles and was the first textile mill in the Ottoman Empire. Industrialisation before the independence in 1878 was largely concentrated around the major towns of Plovdiv, Gabrovo, Ruse, Sliven, Karlovo, Sofia and Samokov. These early companies were mostly small firms with a handful of workers, involved in light manufacture producing high-end goods such as textiles, soap, alcohol, wine and leather products. Competition from more established Western European firms put many of these early enterprises out of business.

=== 1878-1945 ===
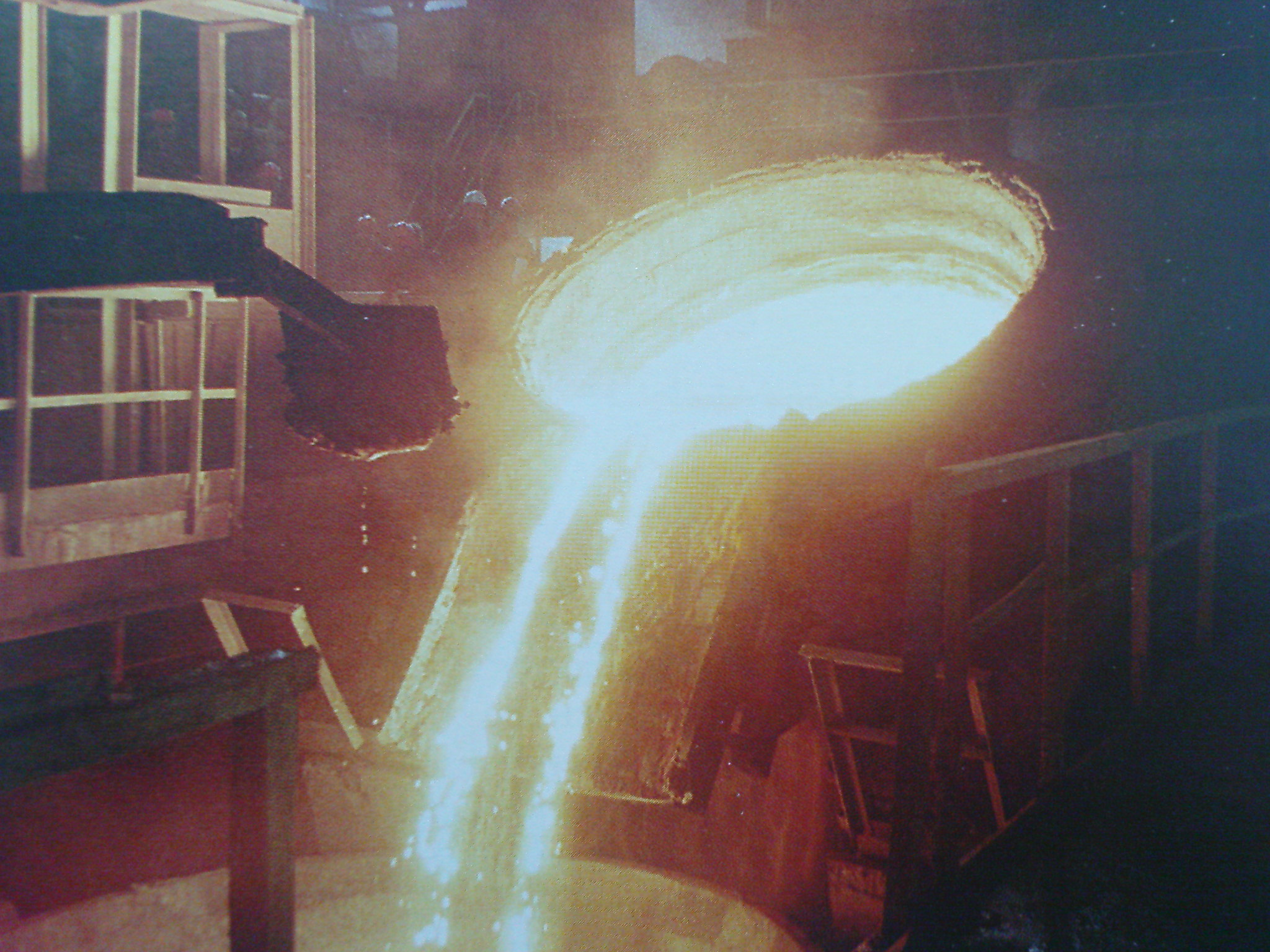
A steel-producing installation at the Kremikovtsi metallurgy works

After the Liberation of Bulgaria the new country settled upon a low tariff regime and as a result local industry suffered from the increased import of cheaper and high-quality goods from more developed producers in Western Europe. A number of protectionist laws passed by the government in the 1890s and early 20th century led to an increase in industrial output. At this time Bulgaria received an inflow of foreign capital largely from Germany, Belgium and Austria-Hungary which was focused mainly in mining and agricultural processing industries. In the 25 years between 1890 and 1915, industry provided 15% of the GDP.

Despite the upheavals of World War I, the number of manufacturing plants increased between the wars. In 1939, there were 3,345 manufacturing enterprises which employed around 112,000 people. The average size was still fairly small — only around 30 employees per factory. The industry still was concentrated mainly in the large cities and their expanding suburbs. Ruse, Plovdiv, Varna, Sofia, Pleven, Stara Zagora, and Gabrovo saw significant expansion between 1920 and 1940. Large parts of the country remained almost entirely agrarian. At the beginning of World War II only five cities, Sofia, Plovdiv, Ruse, Varna and Burgas, accounted for 46.5% of all industrial output.

Manufacturing was still predominantly light and export focused: textiles, leather, footwear and perishables such as tobacco, sugar, butter and meat were produced in large quantities. Mining consisted of the extraction of coal (near Pernik) and small quantities of ferrous ores. Aircraft were produced in Lovech, Bozhurishte and Kazanlak. Darjavna Aeroplanna Rabotilnitsa (State Aircraft Workshops) had a plant in Bozhurishte which focused on military aircraft DAR.

=== 1945-1989 ===
The Communist regime, which ruled Bulgaria for over 40 years after 9 September 1944, prioritised industrial development. All existing plants were nationalized and the entire Bulgarian economy was subjected to a planned economy. There was a sustained increase in production, and new industries were developed very quickly and, as in other Socialist countries, not always efficiently. New industrial complexes on a scale not before seen in the Balkans were constructed. New power plants, chemical works, metallurgical smelters, military producers and other industries were inaugurated. The country's scientific and technical base was not neglected; new schools and universities were built which fed directly into the expanding industrial economy. The national economy was integrated in Comecon and Bulgaria specialized in the production of electronics, motor trucks and tinned food.

During the 1940s, the main objective of the Bulgarian Communist Party was to rebuild the damage caused during the Second World War. New roads and railways were built, as well as small factories. During the 1950s, massive expansion of the electro-transit network brought electricity to all parts of the country. A number of hydro plants including the Batak Hydro-power System and several coal plants were constructed. The extraction of coal was increased and Bulgaria's first oil field, in Shabla, went into production. During the next decade, many military and metallurgical plants were constructed, including the Kremikovtsi and Stomana steelworks. Cooperation on space technologies with the USSR was encouraged and the country supplied the Soviet space program with research devices and computers. Many new factories in the field of micro and precision electronics were inaugurated. In the 1970s, the industrial component of the Bulgarian economy continued to increase. In 1974, Bulgaria became the third communist state to have a functioning nuclear power station (see Kozloduy NPP). On 10 April 1979, Bulgaria became the sixth nation in the world to send a man into space using the Soviet Intercosmos program. During the 80s, Bulgaria was a mass producer of Pravetz series 8), and in 1990 the computer technology industry produced 35% of FOREX earnings.

=== After 1989 ===
After the overthrow of the Communist Regime, the inefficient Bulgarian economy was thrown into chaos. Years of inefficient state planning, environmental degradation and the use of outdated modes of production meant Bulgaria, lagging for years and heavily indebted, struggled to compete in free market conditions. Many manufacturing plants were closed and others went into bankruptcy as the state gave up the battle to try to bring them to profitability. Due to lack of investment, the high-tech component of the Bulgarian economy went into terminal decline, undercut by more modern Asian imports and the collapse of Comecon. The process of privatization was slow and difficult. However, since 2000 Bulgaria has seen heavy foreign investment and its economic fortunes have revived.

== Sectors ==
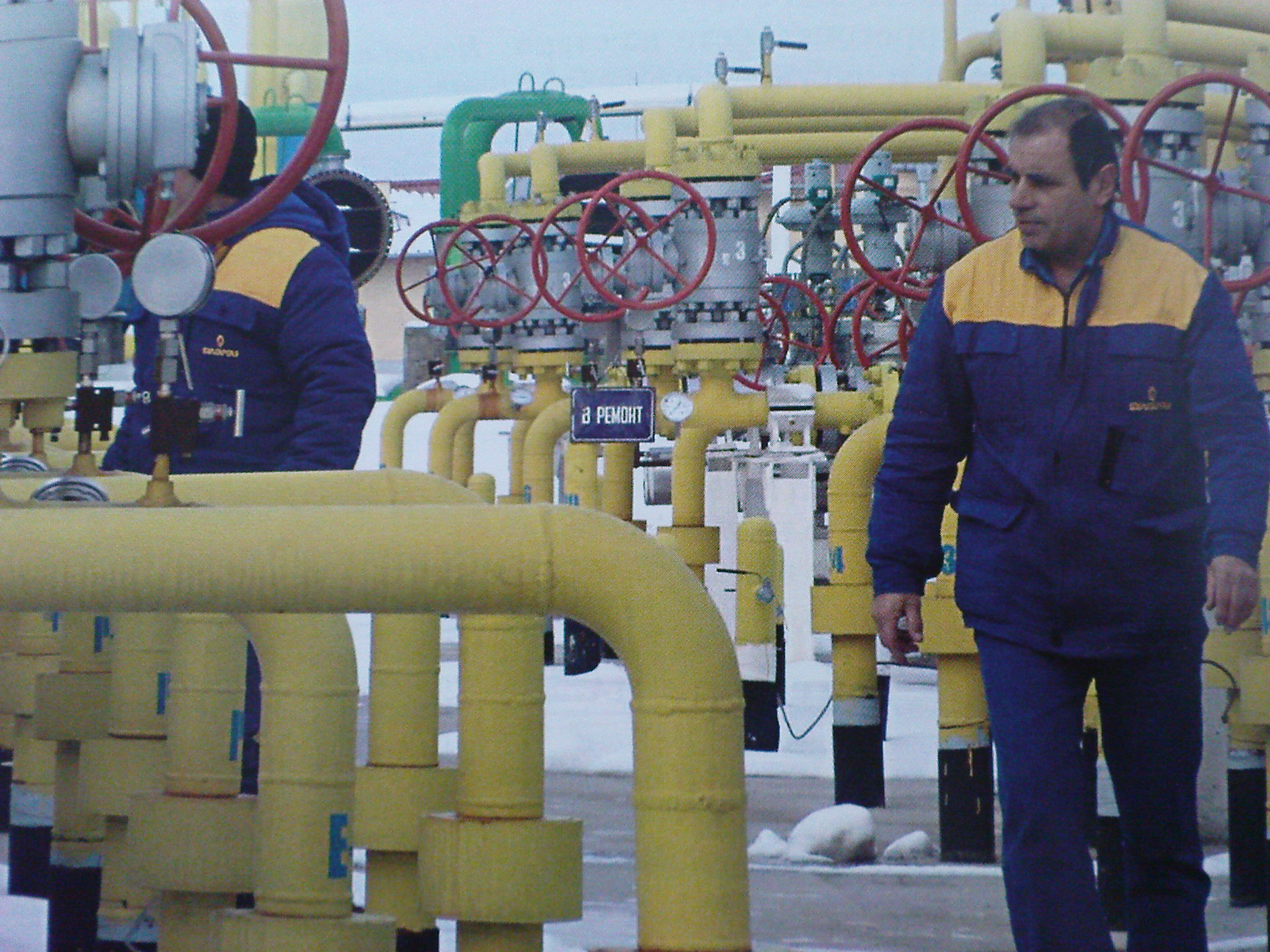
Workers at a natural gas storage depot near Chiren

=== The energy industry ===
Energy is one of the most important sectors in the Bulgarian economy, as it accounts for 18.2% of total industrial production and employs 10.9% of the workforce in the secondary sector. Bulgaria is the primary exporter of electricity in south-eastern Europe as well as a major transit country for Russian oil and gas. Bulgaria's role in the transit of fuels will increase after the construction of several pipelines currently in the planning stage.

Coal is the only natural fuel found in the country in any abundance. Most of the coal reserves are of the lignite type. Total known reserves amount to (4.5 billion tons) in 18 basins. The largest deposit is Maritsa Iztok in Stara Zagora Province, which contains 2.9 billion tons. This is followed in size by the Sofia basin in the Sofia valley (840 mln t.), the Elhovo basin (656 mln t.), the Lom basin (277 mln t.) and the Maritsa Zapad basin (170 mln t.). There is a large deposit of anthracite in Dobrich Province; those reserves are estimated to amount to 1,2 bln t. However, due to the large depth and moisture of the deposit, it is still unexploited. The rate of coal extraction is currently 27,000,000 t per annum, ranking 19th in the world and 6th in the EU. There are small deposits of oil and natural gas, mainly in the north of the country.

Although Bulgaria's fossil fuel deposits are not vast, the country is a major producer of electricity. As of 2007 Bulgaria produces 45.7 billion kWh of electricity.

=== Metallurgy ===
Before the beginning of the 1950s, the metallurgic industry of Bulgaria did not include the whole production cycle, and as of 1939, the sector accounted for as little of 0.5% of the national GDP. As of 1998 that percentage had risen to 11.2%. In the same year there were 51,600 people employed in the sector, including mining and flotation of metals, which is 1.7% of the total workforce.

The first state steel manufacturing factory, "Lenin" (now the private factory "Stomana"), was constructed between 1953 and 1958 in Pernik, a coal-mining city at 20 km to the south-west of Sofia. After the discovery and beginning of exploitation of an iron ore deposit near Kremikovtsi, in 1963 the Kremikovtsi steel complex was built. It was the largest manufacturing factory in the Balkans at the time, and remains one of the largest. Other metalworking factories for production of steel products were constructed in Ihtiman, Roman, Septemvri, Ruse, Burgas and others.

Historical production of pig iron, steel and rolled iron in Bulgaria:

| Year | 1957 | 1970 | 1980 | 1989 | 1998 |
|---|---|---|---|---|---|
| Pig iron | 47,000 t | 1,251,000 t | 1,583,000 t | 1,523,000 t | 1,654,000 t |
| Steel | 159,000 t | 1,800,000 t | 2,565,000 t | 2,900,000 t | 2,628,000 t |
| Rolled iron | 117,000 t | 1,420,000 t | 3,213,000 t | 3,030,000 t | 2,242,000 t |

In the 1980s construction began of the third metallurgic base at Debelt, to the south of Burgas, whose planned capacity was 4,000,000 tons of rolled iron annually. A railway between Burgas and the Maritsa Iztok Complex was planned for the needs of the factory, but after the democratic changes in 1989 the construction works came to a halt.

== See also ==
- Economy of the European Union
- Economy of Bulgaria
- Industry of Romania
- Industry of Croatia
- Transport in Bulgaria
- Energy in Bulgaria
- Tourism in Bulgaria
- Bulgarian lev
