= Kiril Domuschiev =

Bulgarian industrialist and entrepreneur

Kiril Petrov Domuschiev
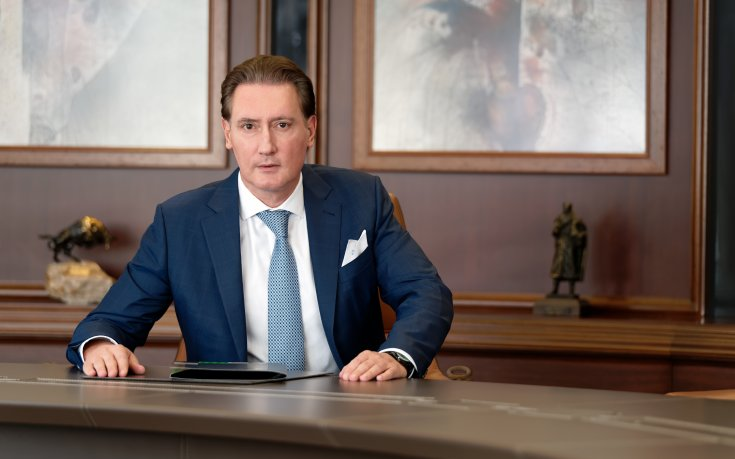
- Born: 18 April 1969 (age 56); Sofia, Bulgaria
- Education: Technical University, Sofia
- Occupations: Businessman, entrepreneur, industrialist
- Years active: 1990–present
- Known for: PFC Ludogorets Razgrad, Huvepharma, Biovet, Navibulgar, Nova Broadcasting Group
- Spouse: Kremena Domuschieva
- Mother: Margarita Domuschievа
- Relatives: Georgi Domuschiev (brother)

Kiril Petrov Domuschiev (Bulgarian: Кирил Петров Домусчиев; born 18 April 1969) is a Bulgarian industrialist, entrepreneur and owner of PFC Ludogorets Razgrad.

On 27 January 2012 he was named an honorary citizen of Razgrad, and in 2019 became an honorary citizen of the state of Nebraska, USA.

== Biography ==
Kiril Petrov Domuschiev was born on 18 April 1969 in the city of Sofia, Bulgaria. He is married and has three children. Kiril Domuschiev completed his secondary education at the 9th French Secondary Language School Alphonse de Lamartine, in Spanish class. Having completing his higher education, he was awarded a master's degree in Industrial Management and Marketing from the Technical University, Sofia. After the changes in 1990 Kiril Domuschiev, together with his brother Georgi Domuschiev, established several companies, manufacturing and trading products such as clothing and footwear.

In 1996 he established the privatization fund Napredak Holding AD, through which he acquired shares in a number of companies in Bulgaria, operating in various industrial sectors. One of these companies is the bicycles and forklift truck manufacturer Balkan AD, where the Domuschiev brothers’ mother – Margarita Domuschieva was appointed as Director in the period 1997 – 2009.

In 1999 Kiril Domuschiev launched his own pharmaceutical business, establishing Huvepharma EOOD, which in 2000 privatized the then public company Biovet AD – owner of a veterinary products factory in the town of Peshtera, Bulgaria. Over the years Huvepharma EOOD constantly progressed to become a global pharmaceutical company focused on developing, manufacturing and marketing of human and veterinary medicine products. The company now owns production sites located in Bulgaria, the United States, France and Italy. Huvepharma markets its products through its own subsidiaries, Representative offices and Distributors and ranks among the top 10 global companies in the area of veterinary medicine.

In 2003 Kiril and Georgi Domuschiev established Advance Properties OOD, each having 50% equity share in the company. Advance Properties is a holding company, through which the Domuschiev brothers make most of their Investments. The leading companies within Advance Properties OOD are doing business mainly in the fields of pharmaceutics, maritime transport, port operations, construction, realties, media, etc.

In 2008, as a result of Privatization procedure, Advance Properties OOD, through its subsidiary KG Maritime Shipping AD acquired 70% of the equity of Navigation Maritime Bulgare AD, a ship-owner company with a history of more than 125 years. Advance Properties OOD is the sole owner of BMF Port Burgas EAD – a port operator and concession holder of Terminal Burgas East 2 and Terminal Burgas West The port of Burgas is of strategic importance for Bulgaria and one of the largest ports in the Black Sea region.

In 2010 Kiril Domuschiev launched his own football project and began investing in the development of PFC Ludogorets 1945 EAD, in the town of Razgrad, Bulgaria. The team earned promotion to the "A" Professional Football Group of the Bulgarian Football Championship and became Bulgarian football champion for the next nine consecutive seasons: 2011/12, 2012/13, 2013/14, 2014/15, 2015/16, 2016/17, 2017/18, 2018/19, 2019/20. In the seasons 2014/15 and 2016/17 the team of PFC Ludogorets 1945 EAD played in the group phase of the UEFA Champions League, and in the seasons 2013/14, 2016/17, 2017/18, 2018/19 and 2019/20 the team also played in Europa League.

In 2011, together with his wife, Kremena Domuschieva, they established the Kremena and Kiril Domuschiev Foundation performing charity services. The Foundation focuses on supporting children's hospitals and specialist institutions for children deprived of parental care and many other diverse activities. During that year Kiril Domuschiev was awarded a Prize for Contribution to the Development of Industry in the competition "Mr. Economics" of the Economics Magazine.

In 2012 he was named "Honorary Citizen of Razgrad". In 2016 the Ombudsman of the Republic of Bulgaria Maya Manolova awarded Kiril Domuschiev with the "Good Heart" award for his personal contribution to the "Easter for Everyone" campaign.

Kiril Domuschiev is the President of Huvepharma EOOD, Chairman of the Supervisory board of Biovet AD and Chairman of the Supervisory board of Navigation Maritime Bulgare AD, chairman of the board of directors of Huvepharma NV, Belgium, member of the board of directors of Huvepharma Inc., United States.

In 2014, for his contribution to the development of the Bulgarian industry, Domuschiev was elected a Chairman of the Management Board of the Confederation of Employers and Industrialists in Bulgaria (CEIBG) – the largest nationally represented employers’ organization in Bulgaria. In March 2017 he was re-elected for a second consecutive term.

Kiril Domuschiev started construction of two new production sites of Biovet for veterinary products in Razgrad and Peshtera. The project was funded with Euro 100 million under the Juncker Plan, which is the largest investment under the program to date. The loan was granted by the European Investment Bank. The contract was signed in January 2018 in Sofia by Kiril Domuschiev, EU Jobs, Growth, Investment and Competitiveness Commissioner Jyrki Katainen and the Minister of Agriculture Rumen Porozhanov, in the presence of President of the European Commission Jean-Claude Juncker and the Bulgarian Prime Minister Boyko Borisov.

In October 2018, at a meeting of the Board of Trustees of the Technical University-Sofia, Kiril Domuschiev was elected a member of the Board of Trustees. The Board includes the best graduates of the university, distinguished experts in their field and well-known public figures with an active position and authority in society. The Board is an active partner of the university in the implementation of effective and transparent governance and the provision of quality education.

In October 2018, Domuschiev's company Huvepharma received the Business of the Year Award for its contribution to the economic development of the City of St. Louis, Missouri, US. The award was presented at a ceremony by the Mayor of St. Louis in the presence of over 1,250 business guests from St. Louis and the state.

In April 2019 Advance Properties acquired Nova Broadcasting Group – the largest media group in Bulgaria. Its portfolio includes 7 television channels, including the leading Bulgarian polythematic channel Nova Television, Nova News radio, print media and the film distribution company LENTA. Nova Broadcasting Group's portfolio also includes numerous digital media and platforms, including the largest Bulgarian online mail service Abv.bg, the leading news portals Nova.bg, Vesti.bg, Dariknews.bg, as well as the sports portal Gong.bg. Nova Broadcasting Group is the largest online market player in the country, reaching about 75% of Internet users in Bulgaria.

In January 2021 Advance Media Group successfully sold Nova Broadcasting Group to United Group. Under Advance Media Group, in the period from April 2019 to January 2021 Nova Broadcasting Group proved its leading position as the largest media group and increased its portfolio to 10 television channels, the biggest Bulgarian online platform Netinfo reaching up to 80% of Bulgarian Internet users monthly, as well as 4 radio stations.

On 19 June 2019, Kiril Domuschiev was presented an honorary citizenship of the US state of Nebraska. The recognition is bestowed by the state's government for the investments made and the jobs created by Kiril Domuschiev. The certificate and the gold seal of the state were presented to Kiril Domuschiev by the Secretary of State of Nebraska – Robert Evnen – during his visit to Sofia. Kiril Domuschiev is the largest Bulgarian investor in the state of Nebraska and in the US. He has manufacturing plants in 5 American states, with investments in Missouri, North Carolina, Arkansas and Colorado, in addition to Nebraska.

On January 20, 2020, Kiril Domuschiev was awarded with the "Winner’s Wreath" by the Sports Minister Krasen Kralev during a ceremony at the "Champion's Night". "Winner's Wreath" is the highest state honors in sports and is given to individuals with great contribution to Bulgarian sport.

In mid March 2020, Domuschiev announced he had tested positive for COVID-19; he recovered towards the end of the month.

In November 2021, the leading American magazine Forbes published an article estimating the wealth of Kiril and Georgi Domuschiev at $4.2 billion. According to Forbes, the family’s fortune is due to their business in Bulgaria, the United States, Belgium, and other companies they own around the globe. The Domuschievs are the Bulgarians with the largest investments in the United States.

In December 2022, Domuschiev and Huvepharma were included with article in Fortune Global 500 ranking, where the company's environmental policy, energy saving efforts and implemented green technologies and processes are presented.

Kiril Domuschiev became a member of the Clinton Global Initiative Advisory Board during his participation in a climate forum at the invitation of President Clinton in late 2022.
