= Tvornica Autobusa Zagreb =

Croatian bus and truck manufacturer

TAZ
- Type: Publicly traded
- Industry: Automotive
- Founded: Zagreb, Yugoslavia (1930)
- Defunct: 2000
- Headquarters: Dubrava, Zagreb, Yugoslavia (until 1991), Croatia
- Area served: Worldwide
- Key people: Ivan Radošević
- Products: Commercial vehicles
- Number of employees: 1200 (c. 1980)

Tvornica autobusa Zagreb (abbreviated as TAZ) was a Yugoslav and Croatian bus and truck manufacturer, which had its headquarters in Dubrava, Zagreb. The company's most famous product was TAZ Dubrava 14. It became defunct in 2000.

== History ==
Production of buses, which were based on a wooden frame, started in Zagreb in 1930. In 1948, it adopted the name Autokaroserija Zagreb, but production still rested on the buses based on a wooden frame.

In 1950, cooperation was established with the factory FAP from Priboj, Serbia and Famos (Fabrika motora Sarajevo) from Sarajevo, Bosnia-Herzegovina and in 1954 the factory TAZ was transferred to the district Dubrava in Zagreb. In 1969, the company founded FAP Famos Beograd which included FAP, Famos and TAZ, as well as Sanos from Skopje, North Macedonia.

Sanos buses were built with motors positioned at the rear, while buses Dubrava (TAZ), depending on the type, have motors located on the front or rear. Both Sanos and Dubrava had a similar design for the middle part of the body, while the difference in physical appearance of both brands' was the front side of the bus body. In the same year collaboration has been with the company Daimler-Benz making model range was based on new technologies.

In 1980 the factory employed 1,200 people and produced an average of 500-600 vehicles (up 900), and buses exported to, among others, China, Finland, Egypt and others.

In 1991, when Croatia gained its independence and disconnected from Yugoslavia, production began to decline sharply, and in the late 1990s has been stopped completely which resulted from, among others, a reduction in the home market and led to TAZ products almost completely disappearing from the roads in favor of used imported buses.

== Products ==
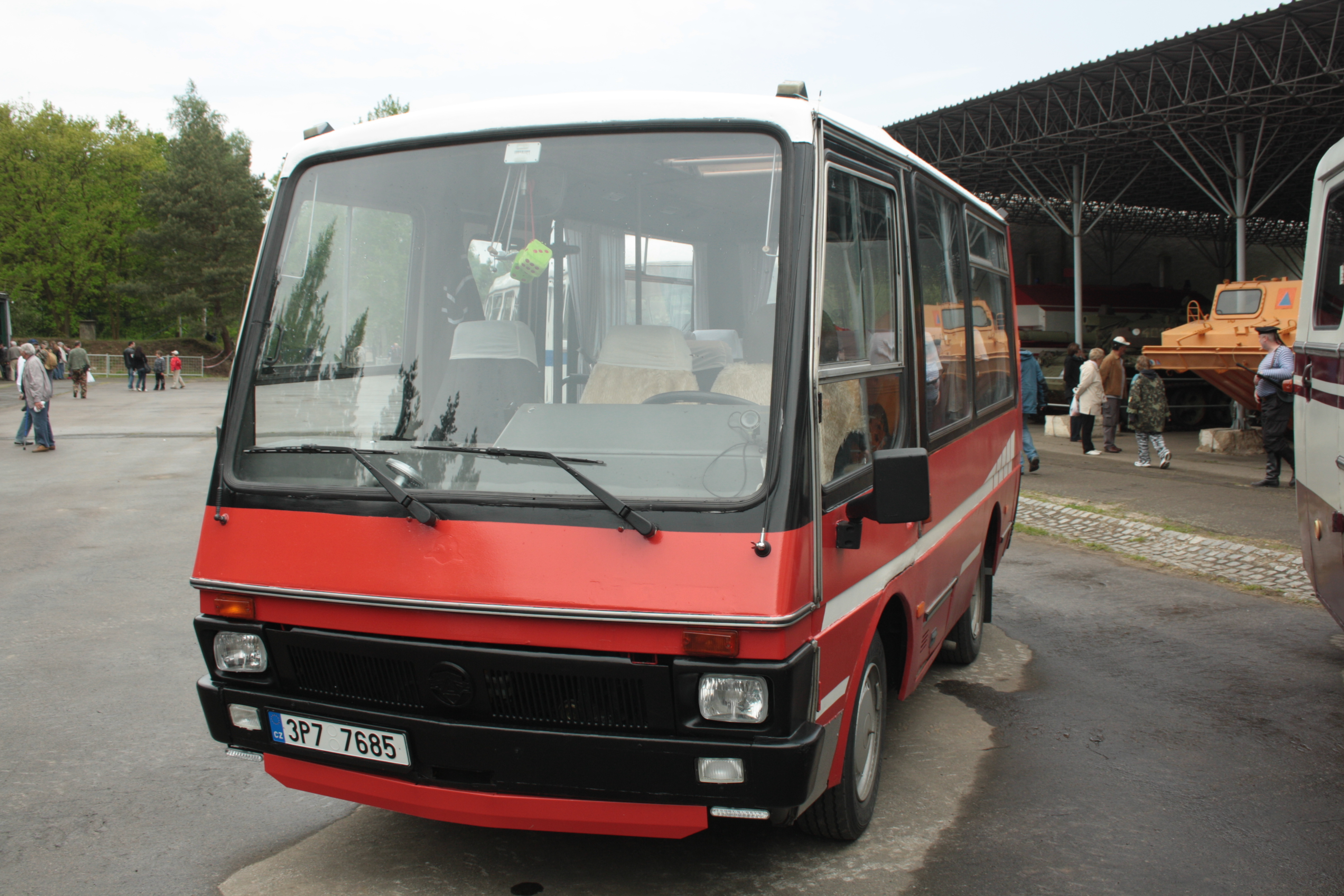
TAZ Neretva

=== Models ===
- TAZ Neretva
- TAZ 1419
- TAZ 1427
- TAZ Dubrava

== See also ==
- List of companies of the Socialist Federal Republic of Yugoslavia
