= Indo Premier Investment Management =

Company of Indonesia

PT Indo Premier Investment Management (IPIM) is an investment management company that launched the first Indonesian equity exchange-traded fund ETF listed on Indonesia Stock Exchange, the Premier ETF LQ-45 (ticker: R-LQ45X).

IPIM was formed as a result from the spin-off of Indo Premier Securities on 18 January 2011 and was licensed by Otoritas Jasa Keuangan (OJK).

== History ==
Initially established 9 January 2003 as PT Citra Cemerlang Bumipersada, latterly changed to PT Indo Premier Inti on 30 July 2004 and finally became PT Indo Premier Investment Management on 15 November 2010. IPIM is currently managed by John D. Item, CFA as the President Director and with Diah Sofiyanti, Ernawan R. Salimsyah, CFA., and Fredy Sumendap, CFA., as the Directors.

On 18 December 2007, IPIM launched the first Equity Exchange Traded Fund (ETF) that was listed on the Indonesian Stock Exchange; the Premier ETF LQ-45 (IDX: R-LQ45X) which tracks LQ45 Index as its target index. IPIM then re-launched the Premier ETF LQ45 with a new provision in December 2011.

On 30 October 2012, IPIM launched the second ETF to be listed on the Indonesian Stock Exchange; Premier ETF IDX 30 (IDX: XIIT) which tracks IDX30 as its target index and IPIM had subsequently launched both Premier ETF Syariah Jakarta Islamic Index (IDX: XIJI) and Premier ETF Indonesia Consumer (IDX:XIIC) on 30 April 2013.

== Funds Under Management ==
Currently, IPIM manages four ETFs listed in Indonesia Stock Exchange, which are:

- Premier ETF LQ-45 (ticker: R-LQ45X), tracks Indonesia Stock Exchange LQ-45 Index
- Premier ETF IDX30 (ticker: XIIT), tracks Indonesia Stock Exchange IDX30 Index
- Premier ETF Syariah JII (ticker: XIJI), tracks Indonesia Stock Exchange Jakarta Islamic Index (JII)
- Premier ETF Indonesia Consumer (ticker: XIIC), an actively managed ETF representing Indonesia's Consumer and Consumer-related sectors

As of May 2013, IPIM manages open-ended mutual funds and close-ended funds as follows:

- Premier Reksa Dana Pasar Uang, a money market fund
- Premier Reksa Dana Campuran Fleksibel, a balanced fund
- Premier Reksa Dana Terproteksi, close-ended funds (as of May 2013)
- Premier Reksa Dana Obligasi, a fixed income fund
- Discretionary Funds
