= DOK-ING Loox =

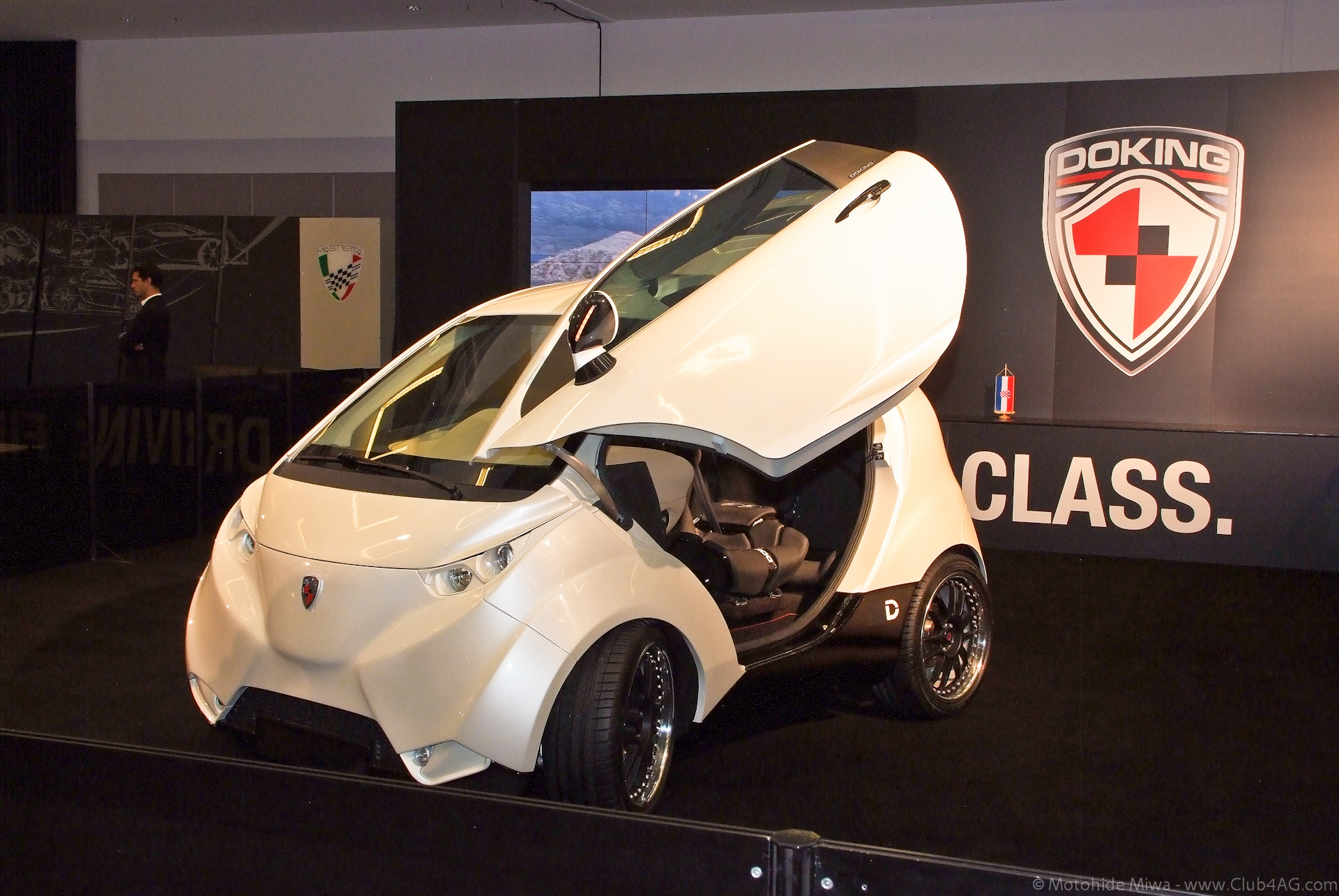

Overview
- Manufacturer: DOK-ING
- Production: ???
- Designer: Igor Jurić

Body and chassis
- Body style: 3-door (including rear door) microcar
- Layout: Rear-wheel drive Four-wheel-drive

Powertrain
- Engine: 2 × 45 kW (60 hp) electric motor (XD2); 4 × 45 kW (60 hp) electric motor (XD4)
- Battery: 33 kWh Lithium-Iron-Phosphate (LiFePo4)
- Electric range: 250km+

Dimensions
- Length: 2,850 mm (112 in)
- Width: 1,800 mm (71 in)
- Height: 1,600 mm (63 in)
- Curb weight: 1,200 kg (2,600 lb) (XD2); 1,300 kg (2,900 lb) (XD4)

The DOK-ING Loox (previously known as DOK-ING XD) is the first Croatian electric car. It is a small three-seat electric city concept car created by DOK-ING. The company aimed only for limited production of 1000 units, but never obtained the funds to get the car to production.

The name XD came from oddly shaped rear lights (X-shaped) and "D" beginning letter of the company's name.(they have changed the name since then) Loox can travel over 250 km on a single charge with lithium iron phosphate batteries. The car has a low drag coefficient factor of only 0.35. Other features include 360 degree airbags, an integrated safety system for electric stability, ABS brakes and power steering. The XD4 can go from 0–100 km in 4.2 seconds. Currently, the only planned non-Croatian part will be the 32 kWh battery which can go for 200-250 kilometers with a charge time of between three and eight hours. The first prototype was completed at the beginning of 2010 and as of 2010 serial production was planned to start in 2012. DOK-ING first exhibited the car at the 2010 Geneva Motor Show.

DOK-ING is a privately owned Croatian company, established in the late 1991 for the production of robotic Unmanned Ground Vehicles (UGV's) for unexploded ordnance removal, firefighting, and underground mining.

== Development ==
In June 2010, DOK-ING announced that mass production would commence and all XDs would be factory fitted with OZ wheels. Later in 2010, DOK-ING unveiled a topless Loox made in collaboration with computer company Lenovo. The vehicle was fitted with Lenovo components and is said to go into production in 2012.

DOK-ING unveiled a production prototype XD at the 2011 Frankfurt Motor Show and announced the two Loox models: the XD2 and XD4, with 2 and 4 motors respectively. 0–100 km (0–60 miles) is achieved in 7.5 seconds for the XD2 and 4.2 seconds for the XD4. The body is made of Kevlar and carbon fibre upon an aluminium space frame. The same vehicle was later displayed at the 2011 Greater Los Angeles Auto Show where more production details were revealed; DOK-ING had plans in 2011 to produce 1,000 units per year with a retail price of $80,000 according to The New York Times or $108,000 according to Fox News.

The electric motors are supplied by the Pula-based Croatian electrical company Tema.

== Production ==
DOK-ING had hoped to find a foreign investor for production to take place, however DOK-ING chairman, Vjekoslav Majetić, confirmed that at least 5 bids have been made for collaboration at the 2010 Geneva Motor Show. Foreign Investment was then expected to support the employment of 200-300 Croatian workers and upgrading of production facilities for mass production. If DOK-ING cannot find a European investor(s), DOK-ING will look for a Chinese investor, and production will be moved to China. If a Chinese investor is not found either, DOK-ING will build the cars on order. 50 orders from Croatian customers have already been accepted and estimated build-to-order production figures are 50 vehicles per year. The first order was by Mr Todoric Agrokor, who also specified every optional extra. The original XD concept costs roughly $40,000 but if mass production starts, the price is estimated to fall to roughly $26,000. At one time, the Croatian Government had pledged some funding for the project, but it is unclear if any of that ever came in.

They've sold their first unit to the Faculty of Electrical Engineering in Zagreb, and have stated they received orders from USA and Russia, and serial production could start soon.

== Design ==
Designed by Igor Jurić, the vehicle was fully designed in approximately three months. Some of the design features include butterfly doors, a Mclaren F1-style seating position and 'x' shaped rear lights. The car was announced in 2009 after four years of development.

== See also ==
- Government incentives for plug-in electric vehicles
- List of modern production plug-in electric vehicles
- Plug-in electric vehicle
