= Rheinmetall Unmanned Vehicles =

Croatian vehicle manufacturer

Rheinmetall Unmanned Vehicles d.o.o.
- Industry: Unmanned ground vehicles, electric vehicles
- Founded: 1992
- Headquarters: Zagreb, Croatia
- Key people: Marijo Grgurinović (Chairman)
- Products: Mine flails, fire fighting vehicles, mining vehicles, electric vehicles
- Revenue: ▲€70.61million (2024)
- Number of employees: 230 (2024)
- Website: rheinmetall.unmanned.vehicles

Rheinmetall Unmanned Vehicles d.o.o. (formerly known as DOK-ING d.o.o.) is a Croatian company which manufactures unmanned multi-purpose vehicles, electric vehicles and robotic systems, established in 1992. Its products make up 80% of the world's robotized mine clearing machines.

== History ==
The company was formed in 1992 by Vjekoslav Majetić. It primarily develops and produces robotic and autonomous systems intended for use in various situations. Their vehicles are used for demining, firefighting, underground mining and counter-terrorism purposes.

The electric motors for their vehicles are largely supplied by the Pula-based company Tema.

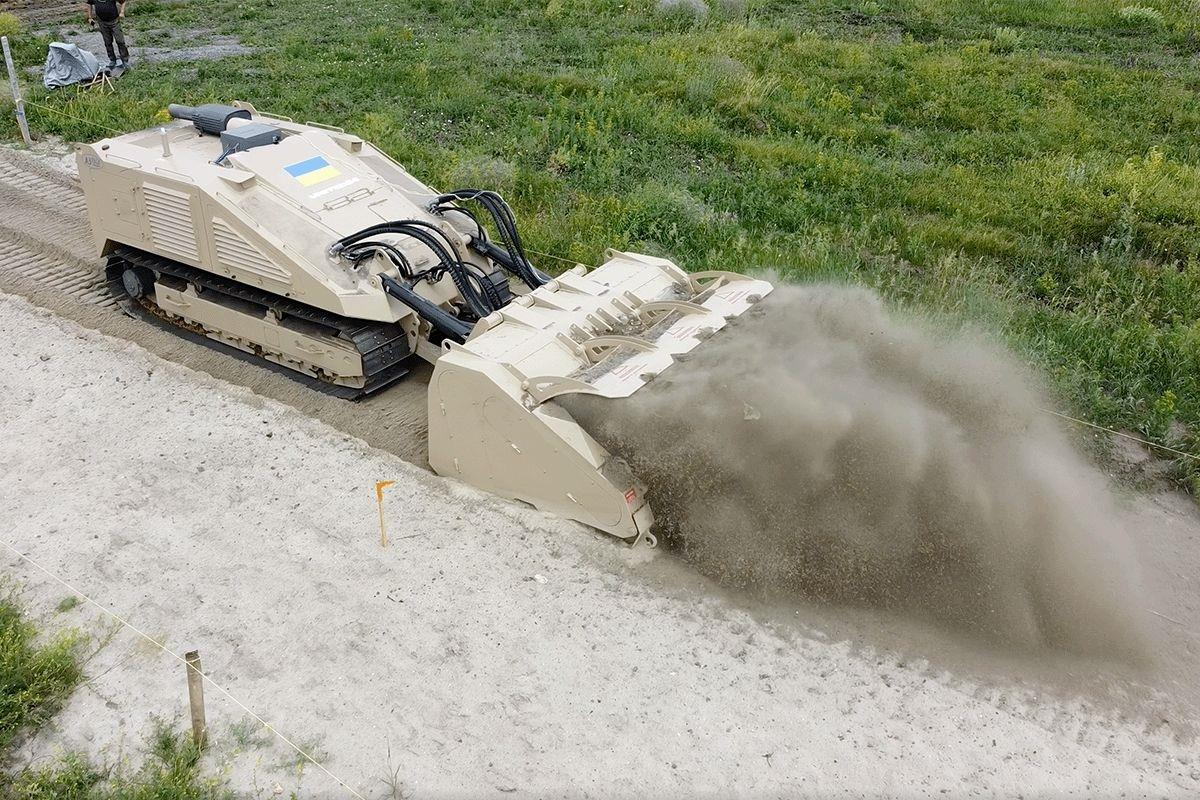
A Ukrainian-built DOK-ING MV-10 demining machine in operation.

During 2023, in the wake of the Russian invasion of Ukraine, it was reported that negotiations were underway with the Ukrainian MoD to localise the production of its MV-4 mine clearing vehicle in Ukraine. A number of these vehicles were previously purchased or donated to Ukraine. In 2024, it opened its representative office in Kyiv. By 2025, it increased the localisation of its production to 30% in Ukraine.

During 2024, it entered a joint-venture with Rheinmetall, with purpose of developing unmanned vehicles intended for mine scattering, tank support, air defence and reconnaissance.

In 2025, the company unveiled an integrated unmanned ground combat system consisting of their proprietary MV-8 Komodo robotic platform, adapted to support military applications, with the Mangart 25 AD remote-controlled turret, produced by Valhalla Systems.

In March 2026, Rheinmetall acquired a 51% stake in DOK-ING, thus gaining control of the company.

== Dok-Ing Automotiv ==
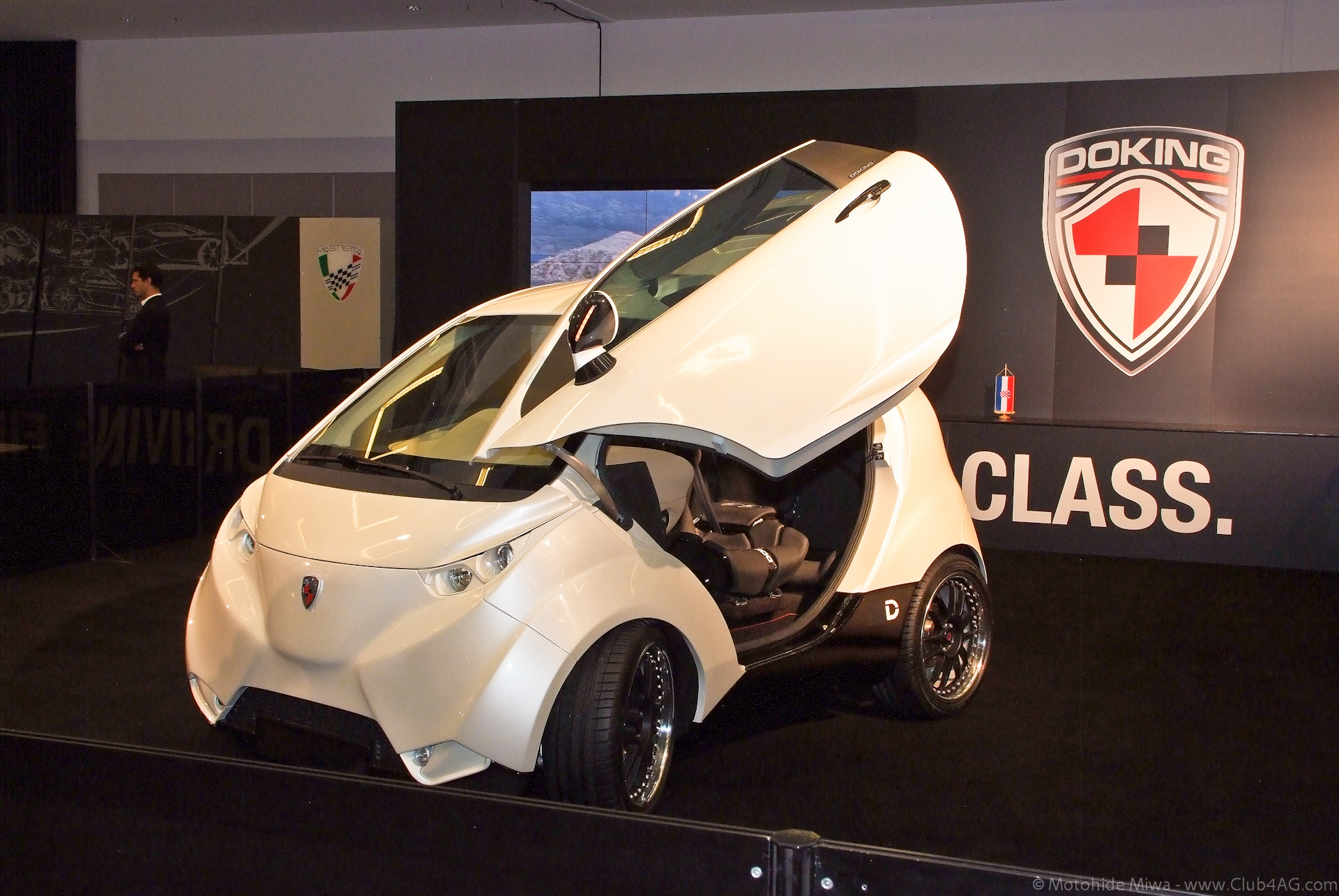
The DOK-ING XD concept car at the 2011 Los Angeles Auto Show.

The automotive division was formed upon the introduction of the electric car Dok-Ing XD in 2010. The car remained in prototype phase and never formally entered serial production, although one unit was sold to the Faculty of Electrical Engineering in Zagreb.

In 2015, it produced two electric buses for the city of Koprivnica, as a part of the European project Civitas Dyn@mo. In the following year, it unveiled a multifunctional communal vehicle TOM TOM, which received awards from various international fairs. During the same year, it launched a serial production of electric scooters under the name "Core", with 800 of them already exported to Spain, Mexico, France, Italy and Malta in 2017. The batteries are produced by Dok-Ing. The company also launched a series of electric bikes called "Leo".

In 2017, it announced a new model of electric car, under the working name of YD, expected to have a range of 300–400 km.

In 2019, the division was sold and excluded from DOK-ING during restructuring of the overall company. DOK-ING Automotiv began operating under a new name afterwards.

== Products ==
=== Current ===
==== Mine Clearance Vehicles ====
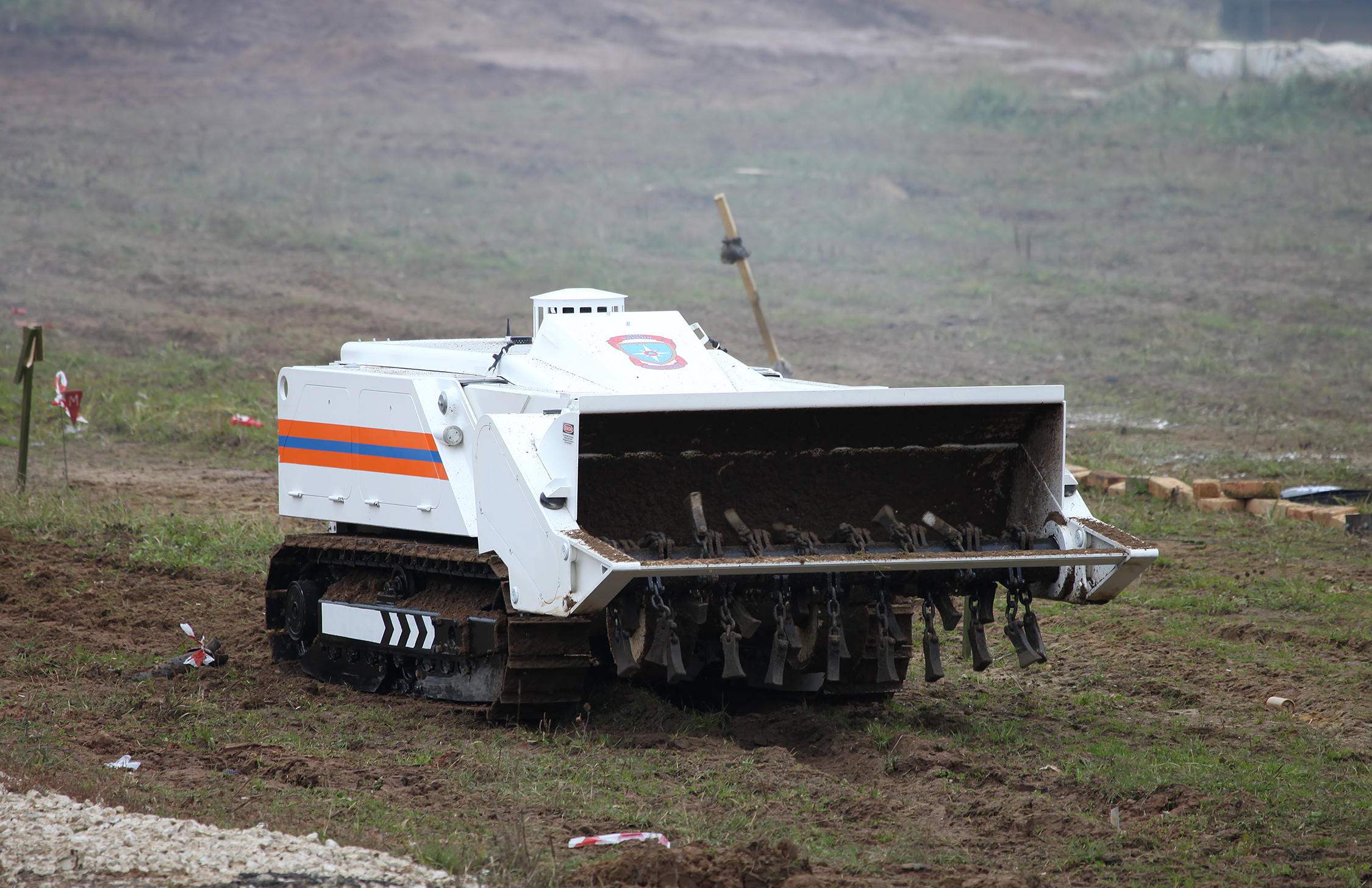
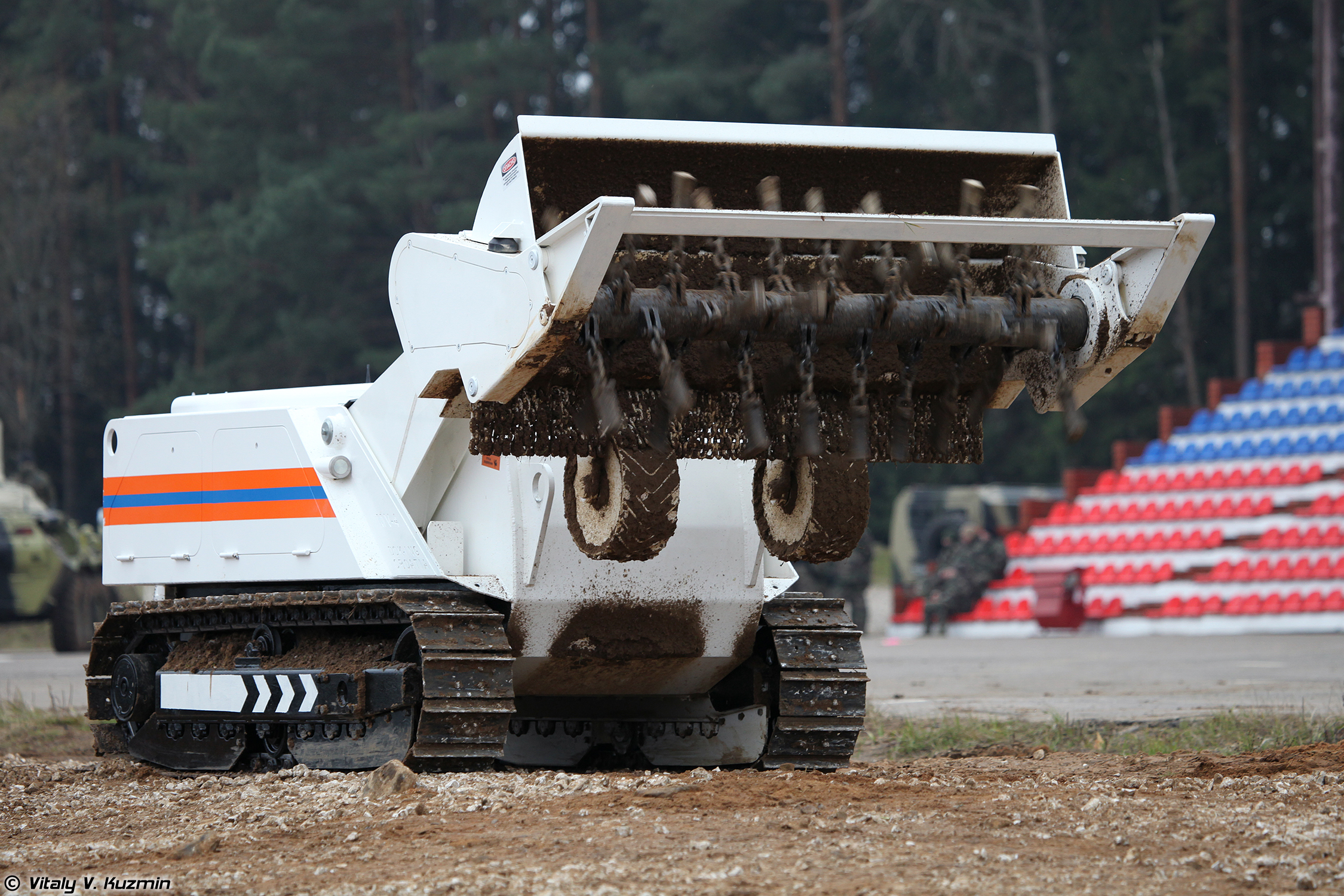
A DOK-ING MV-4 mine-clearance vehicle demonstrated at Interpolitex 2013 in Moscow.
- MV-4
- MV-10

==== Fire Fighting Vehicles ====
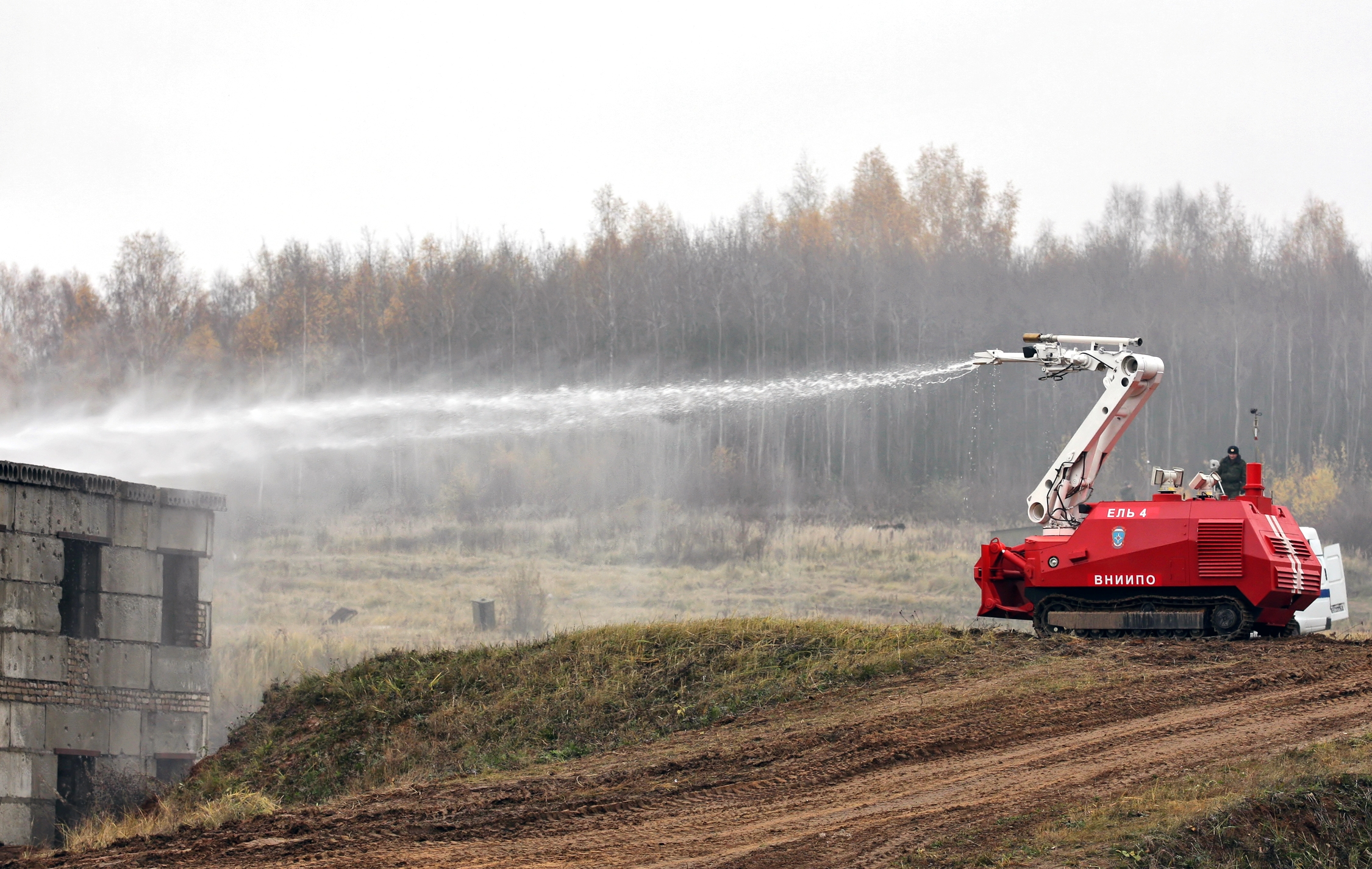
A DOK-ING Jelka-4 remote-controlled fire fighting vehicle.

- MVF-5

==== Underground Mining Vehicles ====
- MVD

=== Discontinued ===
==== Fire Fighting Vehicles ====
- JELKA-4
- JELKA-10

==== Mine Clearance Vehicles ====
- MV-2
- MV-3
- MV-20

==== Robots ====
- EOD

== International Users ==
Users
| Armed Forces | Number of Units |
|---|---|
| US Army | 41 MV-4s + 44attachments |
| Swedish Army | 5 MV-4s |
| Croatian Army | 4 MV-4s |
| Ecuador Army | 31 MV-4s + 31attachments |
| Irish Army | 2 MV-4s |
| South Korean Army | 2 MV-4s + 8 more planned |
| Italian Army | 3 MV-4 |
| Hellenic Army | 1 MV-4 |
| Lithuanian Army | 1 MV-10 |
| Sri Lankan Army | 12 MV-4s |
| Colombian National Army | 2 MV-4s |
| Australian Army | 8 MV-10s + 16 attachments |
| Libyan Army | 4 MV-4s (2 flails + 2 tillers) |
| GCAN Nicaragua | 2 MV-4s + 1 attachment |
| Government Agencies | Number of Units |
| Croatia Mine Action Centre (CROMAC) | 4 MV-4s |
| Iraqi National Mine Action Authority | 4 MV-4s |
| Azerbaijan National Agency for Mine Action | 1 MV-4 |
| Ministry of Nation Building and Estate Infrastructure Development (Sri Lanka) | 3 MV-4s |
| Humanitarian Organisations | Number of Units |
| Norwegian People's Aid (NPA) | 1 MV-4 |
| Swiss Foundation for Mine Action (FSD) | 1 MV-4 |
| United Nations World Food Programme | 4 MV-4s |
| Commercial Companies | Number of Units |
| Mechem Consultants | 5 MV-4s + 1 tiller |
| RONCO Consulting Corporation | 2 MV-4s + 1 flail |
| REASeuro Worldwide | 1 MV-4 |
| SEDITA | 1 MV-4 |
| Private Demining Companies | Number of Units |
| DOK-ING Demining | 2 MV-4s, 3 MV-10s, 1 MV-20 |
| DIZ-EKO | 1 MV-4 |
| AVANGARD | 1 MV-4 |
| Enigma | 2 MV-4s, 1 MV-10 |
| TITAN | 1 MV-4 |
| ISTRAŽIVAČ | 2 MV-4s |
| Mining Industry | Number of Units |
| Anglo Platinum | 22 MVDs |
| DOK-ING | 6 MVDs |
| Fire Fighting Industry | Number of Units |
| Ministry of Emergency Situations (Russia) | 1 Jelka-4, 1 Jelka-10 |
