= Industry in Romania =

Romanian economic sector

Romania has been successful in developing dynamic telecommunications, aerospace, and weapons sectors. Industry and construction accounted for 32% of gross domestic product (GDP) in 2018, a comparatively large share even without taking into account related services. The sector employed 26.4% of the workforce. With the manufacture of over 600,000 vehicles in 2018, Romania was Europe's sixth largest producer of automobiles. Dacia is producing more than 1,000,000 cars a year (with 1 factory in Morocco).

In 2004 Romania enjoyed one of the largest world market share in machine tools (5.3%). Romanian-based companies such as Automobile Dacia, Ford, Petrom, Rompetrol and Bitdefender are well known throughout Europe. However, small- to medium-sized manufacturing firms still form bulk of the manufacturing sector. These firms employ two-thirds of the Romanian workforce.

Romania's industrial output is expected to advance 7% in 2018, while agriculture output is projected to grow 12%. Final consumption is also expected to increase by 11% overall – individual consumption by 14.4% and collective consumption by 10.4%. Domestic demand is expected to go up 12.7%.

The growth of the industrial sector was the principal stimulus to economic development. In 2018 manufacturing industries accounted for approximately 35 percent of the gross domestic product and 29 percent of the work force. Benefiting from strong domestic encouragement and foreign aid, Bucharest's industrialists introduced modern technologies into outmoded or newly built facilities at a rapid pace, increased the production of commodities—especially those for sale in foreign markets—and plowed the proceeds back into further industrial expansion. As a result, industry is expected to grow by 7.1% in 2018.

Heavy industries generally were located in the south of the country. Factories in Bucharest contributed over 25 percent of all manufacturing value-added in 2018; taken together with factories in surrounding Ilfov, factories in the Bucharest area produced 26 percent of all manufacturing that year. Factories in Bucharest employed 18 percent of the nation's 3.1 million factory workers.

== Construction ==
Construction activity (about 10% of GDP) has increased due to recent tax incentives. Romania is becoming an increasingly popular choice for British property investors, according to recent research from Currencies Direct. The latest Global Emerging Markets Index from the foreign exchange company shows that Romania has made the top ten for the first time, reaching number nine. The monthly index is based on the number of foreign exchange transfers undertaken by the firm to emerging market regions for property purchases. According to Currencies Direct, Romania has seen significant increases in house prices in recent years and its interest rate has dropped from a level of 154 per cent in 1997 to 8.9 per cent in 2005.

The construction industry in Romania contributed an estimated 5.95% in 2006 to the country's gross domestic product (GDP). Business Monitor International released Romania Infrastructure Report Q2 2007 in which they forecast an average industry growth rate of 6.84% over the 2007–2011 period.

The construction industry has been receiving funds from foreign institutions including European Bank for Reconstruction and Development (EBRD) and European Investment Bank (EIB). Furthermore, the Romanian Ministry of Environment and Water Management is making efforts to align the Romanian environment standards with the European standards. One of the ongoing projects in the country is the construction work on the various sections of the Bucharest-Brasov motorway. An increasing number of foreign companies are showing interest in electrical production capacities in the country. Companies include Germany's Siemens, U.S-based AES Corporation and Geneva-based Societe Bancaire Private.

However, the construction industry is subject to a number of risks, which can affect its growth. The rising budgetary deficit, for example, has had an increasingly adverse impact on the availability of funds for the infrastructure sector.

Despite the drawbacks, BMI ranked Romania 12th out of the 13 states included from the Emerging Europe for the infrastructure business environment. The construction industry is forecast to reach a value of RON36.2bn (US$13.41bn) by 2011, from an estimated RON20.88bn (US$7.43bn) in 2006.

== Manufacturing ==
The general pattern of development for wealthy nations was a transition from a primary industry-based economy to a manufacturing-based one, and then to a service-based economy. Romania did not follow this pattern, manufacturing has always been secondary, though certainly not unimportant. In part because of this, Romania did not suffer as greatly from the pains of deindustrialization in the 1970s and 1980s. Manufacturers have been attracted to Romania due to the highly educated population with lower labour costs than the EU. Romania's government-run healthcare system is also an important attraction, as it exempts companies from the high health insurance costs they must pay in the EU. Romania is also perceived as a dynamic market for machine tools, especially in the backdrop of growth in the domestic automobile and mechanical engineering sectors. Romanian machine tool exports abroad have been growing at double digit figure since 2002. Moreover, Romanian exports saw an increase of 23 percent in the first half of 2007 compared to the same period last year. The exports comprised mainly machining centres, grinding, honing, lapping machines, gear cutting machines, lathes and milling machines, presses and other metal forming machine tools.

== Car manufacturing ==
Much of the Romanian manufacturing industry consists of branch plants of EU firms, though there are some important domestic manufacturers, such as Dacia, Roman Braşov, Igero.

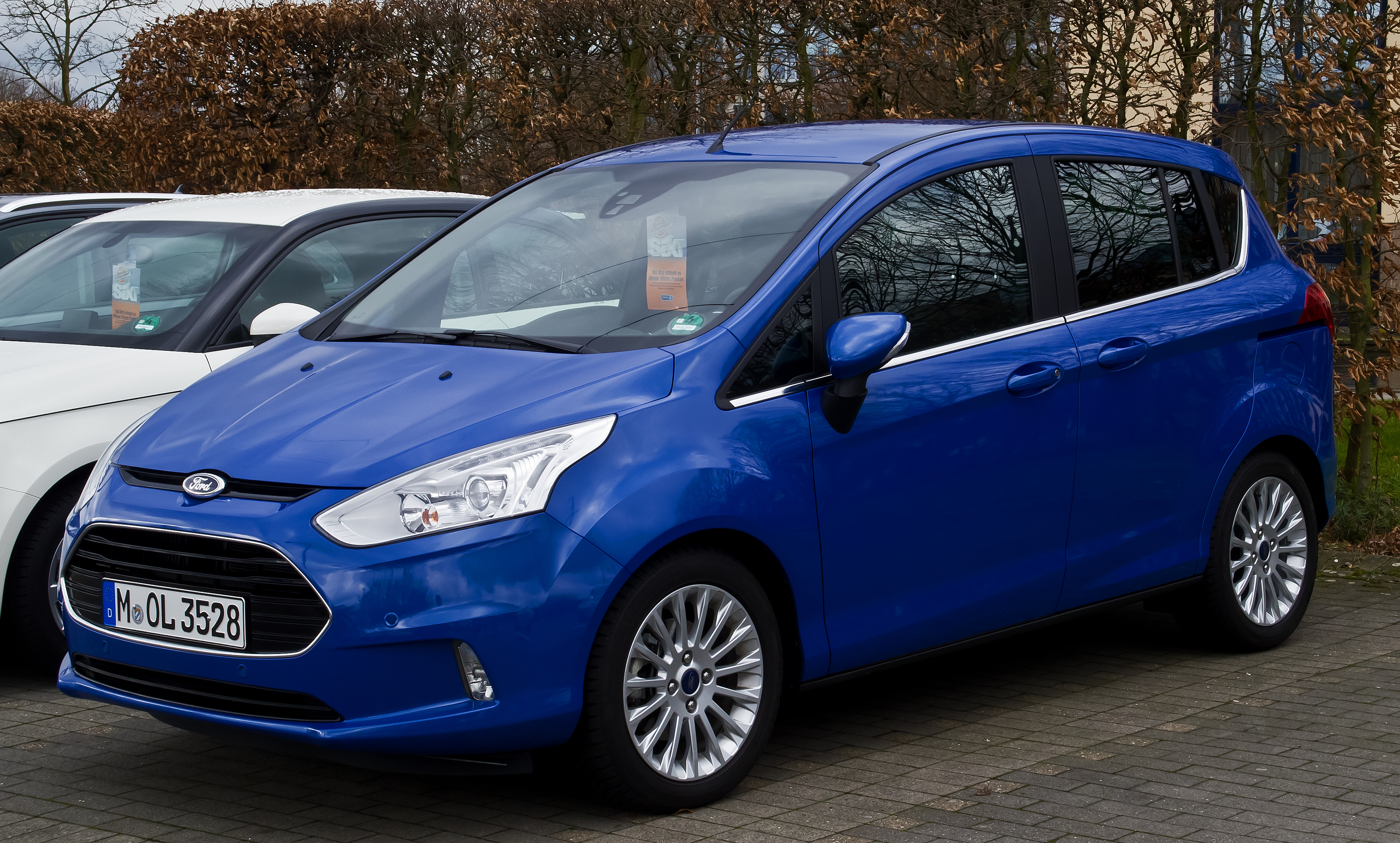
Ford B-Max

Ford bought Daewoo Romania company for €57 million to produce Ford automobiles to a car production estimated to be over 300,000 by 2010. Ford will invest €675 million (US$923 million) in the former Daewoo car factory. Ford also said it would buy supplies from the Romanian market worth €1 billion (US$1.39 billion).

The Dacia Logan was the top-selling new car in Central and Eastern Europe in the first half of 2007 with 52,750 units sold, ahead of Škoda Fabia (41,227 units), Škoda Octavia (33,483 units), Opel Astra (16,442 units) and Ford Focus (14,909 units), shows a market survey of JATO Dynamics, a supplier of automotive market intelligence.

=== Automobiles ===
- Total number of cars: 4,908,885
- Cars per 1,000 capita: 166

In 2013, the Romanian automotive industry ranks fourth in Central and Eastern Europe, behind that of the Czech Republic, Slovakia, and Poland, with a total car production of 410,997 units.

In Romania are produced a wide range of automobiles, minivans, sport utility vehicles, buses, and trucks. In 2007 Romania exported US$3.7 billion worth of vehicles and components. The vehicle export was 120,000 units in 2007. It was expected for 2008 to export about 250,000 units. The vehicle and component export is targeted to reach US$20 billion by 2010. Dacia Logan was the top-selling new car in Central and Eastern Europe in the first half of 2007 with 52,750 units sold, ahead of Škoda Fabia (41,227 units), Škoda Octavia (33,483 units), Opel Astra (16,442 units) and Ford Focus (14,909 units).

== High technology ==
Romania planners realized that the country needed to advance quickly in such areas as high technology if the economy were to grow while matching foreign competition. In 1997 the Romania Development Institute issued a report, Romania Year 2000, that profiled Romania economic development in 2000. The Romania Development Institute noted that the industrial structure would be highly developed and would resemble that of advanced countries inasmuch as high value-added industries, high-technology industries, and soft industries grew relatively rapidly. Further, changes in industrial structure were expected rapidly to reduce the demand for unskilled workers while simultaneously increasing the demand for professional and technical manpower, resulting in further change of the employment structure.

The Romania Development Institute also noted that the Ministry of Science and Technology had prepared a long-range plan of science and technology for the twenty-first century that took into account limited available resources. Accordingly, Romania selected its comparative advantage areas, including informatics—particularly information storage and retrieval and electronic data processing, fine chemicals, and precision machinery in the short term; biotechnology and new materials in the mid-term; public benefit areas, such as the environment, health, and welfare, as another group; and oceanography and aeronautics for the medium and long term.

In 2000 Romania announced an ambitious plan to promote science and technology so that high-technology activities would dominate the economy by the year 2007. The Ministry of Science and Technology intended to coordinate technology-related projects between government and industry in a variety of fields including semiconductors, computers, chemistry, and new materials.

== Information technology ==
=== IT Sector ===
Romania has experienced a growing market in Europe for technology investment and outsourcing, with a skilled and diversified workforce, competitive prices, and a stimulating business environment with a ICT sector worth 23 billion EUR as of 2023. Romania's IT sector has seen continuous growth over the past decade, despite political turbulence and economic crisis, which is a good indicator of its driving force in the Romanian economy.

Romania is one of the fastest-growing information technology (IT) markets in Central and Eastern Europe. The country has made significant progress in all of the information and communications technology (ICT) subsectors, including basic telephony, mobile telephony, the Internet and IT. The country's telecoms sector has been deregulated, expanded and modernised over the past 15 years.

=== Leader in Europe ===
Romania is the leader in Europe, and sixth in the world, in terms of the number of certified IT specialists, with density rates per 1,000 inhabitants greater than in the US or Russia. There are about 100,000 specialists in the IT sector. Approximately 15,000 of the 40,000 engineers graduating every year in Romania are trained in ICT. Microsoft acquired Romanian Antivirus Technology in 2003. According to Microsoft, Romania has a clear potential in information technology, an area in which Romanian students, researchers and entrepreneurs excel. Its western-oriented culture and the high educational degree of its youth bring Romania forward as a huge potential market (the second largest software producer in Eastern Europe). In terms of IT outsourcing services Romania is ranked in the third place worldwide successfully challenging India.

The IT market is one of the most dynamic sectors of the Romanian economy. Since the year 1994 the IT market has demonstrated growth rates of 40–60 percent a year. The biggest sector in terms of revenue is system and network integration, which accounts for 28,3% of the total market revenues. Meanwhile, the fastest-growing segment of the IT market is offshore programming. The industry of software development outsourcing crossed the mark of $3 billion of total revenues in 2005 and reached $4.8 billion in 2006. Currently, Romania controls 5 percent of the offshore software development market and is the third leading country (after India and China) among software exporters. Such growth of software outsourcing in Romania is caused by a number of factors. One of them is the supporting role of the Romanian Government. The Government has launched a program promoting construction of IT-oriented technology parks – special zones that have an established infrastructure and enjoy a favorable tax and customs regime. Another factor stimulating the IT sector growth in Romania is the presence of global technology corporations such as Intel, Motorola, Oracle, Sun Microsystems, Boeing, Nokia and others, which have intensified their software development activities and opened their R&D centers in Romania.

The ICT industry has broadened its focus beyond manufacturing equipment to maintenance and management services as well as creating audio, video, print and digital content. These developments are anticipated to create a variety of new opportunities in Romania's ICT market. On the occasion of the World Electronics Forum (Paris 2000), the "Worldwide ICT Professionals Market Situation Study" showed that, by 2008, Romania will be the only European country to have excellent IT specialists. Currently, about 25,000 software professionals work in the industry and almost 1/5 of them are involved in software export activities. As of 2003. Romania ranked the 6th in the world by number of certified professionals ("2003 Global Skills IQ Report", Brainbench) and has been awarded a bronze certificate in the category of "Most Certified Nation (Overall)" during the first annual Bench Games 2005 ("2005 Bench Games Report", Brainbench). Vice president for EMEA, showed that Oracle was committed to encouraging this country to take advantage of its potential: "Oracle aims to help push Romania into becoming the Silicon Valley of Central and Eastern Europe."

=== Economic structure and sustained growth ===
The emergence of Romania as a software & IT-exporting country has raised a number of issues for Romanian economic policy. There has been concern that much of Romania's human capital investment has been concentrated in IT-related industries. Critics have pointed out that Romania's economic structure is highly dependent on human resources that do require skilled labor, making economic growth highly vulnerable to fluctuations in the demand and pricing for these IT % software resources. The Government Pension Fund of Romania is part of several efforts to hedge against dependence on IT & software revenue.

== Industry turnover ==
In 1938, Romania produced 6.6 million tons of crude oil, 284,000 tons of crude steel, 133,000 tons of pig iron, 510,000 tons of cement and 289,000 tons of rolled steel.

Romania's industry turnover went up by 11.7% in 2017 compared to 2016, as the manufacturing industry increased by 11.5% and the mining industry grew by 20.5%, according to the National Statistics Institute (INS).

By main industrial groups, there were rises as follows: in energy industry (+22.5%), in capital goods industry (+16.2%), in intermediate goods industry (+10.2%), in durable goods industry (+8.2%) and in non-durable goods industry (+5.5%).

The new orders in the manufacturing industry increased by 12.9% last year compared to 2016. The new orders for consumer durables went up by 27.2% and those for intermediate goods increased by 17.3%.

Industry generates about 35% of Romania's gross domestic product (GDP).

== Steel industry ==
- Galați steel works
- Hunedoara steel works
- Reșița Works
- Călărași steel works
- Călan steel works

== Arms industry ==
Romania is the 11th largest arms supplier in the world. The Romanian arms industry's main customer, for whom they mainly build warships, vehicles, and equipment, is the Romanian Government. Furthermore, record high defense expenditure (currently at 5 billion €), which was considerably increased under the government of Prime Minister Călin Popescu-Tăriceanu. In addition, external demand plays a significant part in the growth of this sector: for example, Romania exports great quantities of weaponry to the Middle East, including Iraq.

In recent years, the Romanian Government has called, unsuccessfully, for the lifting of the EU weapons trade embargo on China.
