= Turković =

Turković or Turkovic may refer to:

- Almir Turković (born 1970), Bosnian retired professional football forward
- Bisera Turković (born 1954), Bosnian diplomat and politician
- Dževad Turković (born 1972), Croatian former football player
- Hrvoje Turković (born 1943), Croatian film scholar
- Ksenija Turković (born 1964), Croatian jurist and judge
- Milan Turković (businessperson) (1857–1937), Croatian businessman and nobleman
- Milan Turković (musician) (born 1939), Croatian-born Austrian bassoonist
- Nedo Turković (born 1989), Bosnian footballer
- Nika Turković (born 1995), Croatian singer
- Petar Turković (born 1957), Croatian psychotherapist, master of martial arts, and sports executive
- Petar Dragan Turković (1855–1916), Croatian businessman and nobleman
- Šeki Turković (born 1953), Serbian turbo-folk singer from Sandžak
- Vjenceslav Turković (1826–1902), Croatian businessman, merchant, ship-owner, and politician
- Turković family, Croatian business and noble family from Kutjevo
