= Turković family =

Croatian noble family

Turkovich of Kutjevo Turković Kutjevski
- Croatian noble family
- Current region: Croatia
- Origin: Kutjevo
- Founded: 1911; 115 years ago
- Historic seat: Kutjevo Abbey
- Titles: (Kingdom of Croatia-Slavonia) Baron of Kutjevo

Turković (Turkovich) is a Croatian noble family from Kutjevo, Croatia. The Turković brothers, Petar Dragan and Milan, were awarded the title of Baron in 1911 by the Austrian Emperor Franz Joseph I with the particle Kutjevski (of Kutjevo).

== History ==
The Turković is a family that originated from Kraljevica, where they were primarily engaged in trade. Ivan Matija Turković, the family's patriarch, was involved in the business of coffins and wooden products, and later became a ship-owner and landlord. Due to his position and education, he was appointed as the papal consul for a period of 30 years. During the French rule from 1809 to 1812, he served as the máire of Kraljevica and Bakar. He was blessed with three sons, namely Andrea Francesco (died 1843), Ivan Nepomuk (born 1796), and Vjenceslav.

Vjenceslav Turković eventually moved from Kraljevica to Karlovac, where he engaged in the businesses of wood and grain and owned his ships. In 1858, he founded the Turković-Türk Company together with Franjo Türk, which continued to operate until 1886. His two sons, Petar Dragan and Milan, followed in his footsteps and continued their economic and commercial activities. In 1882, Vjenceslav acquired an estate in Kutjevo at an auction held by the Triune Kingdom Government. Over a period of 63 years, from 1882 to 1945, the Turković family transformed the Kutjevo Estate into a prosperous venture, which gained recognition in winegrowing and winemaking circles. They expanded their vineyards and orchards, and the Draganlug plantation was regarded as the largest in Europe at the time. They also brought in skilled labor and improved vine cultivation and cellaring, which led to significant changes in the habits and practices of the local population.

Petar Dragan, one of Vjenceslav's sons, founded the Zagrebačka pivovara, a brewery in Zagreb, and served as the president of the Croatian Eskompt Bank and the grand prefect of Zagreb County. His three sons founded the Turković Brothers Bank in Zagreb in 1919, which was liquidated after World War II. The Turković family's entrepreneurial spirit and business acumen have made them a prominent name in Croatia's commercial history.

== Notable members ==
The list below includes male members of the Turković family.

- Vjenceslav (1826–1902)
  - Ljuboslava; married Milan Krešić, had two children Mira and Milan
  - Ivan; he had sons Zlatko and Milivoje, and a daughter Ivana
  - baron Petar Dragan (1855–1916)
    - baron Vladimir (1878–1951); he had daughters Darinka and Marija
    - baron Davorin (1883–1944)
      - Petar (1921–1996)
        - Petar (born 1957), daughters Nika and Kiara
      - Nikola (1923–2021), had a son Alain and daughter Christine
    - baron Velimir (1894–1939)
  - baron Milan (1857–1937)
    - baron Zdenko (1892–1968); had a daughter, Ksenija.
    - baron Fedor (1894–1946)
      - Milan (born 1939)
  - Jelka; married Dr Eugen Winkler, had daughters: Ivana, Željka, and Olga.

== Legacy ==
- Milanlug, a village in the Čaglin Municipality, was named after Milan Turković.
- Draganlug, a village in the Čaglin Municipality, was named after Petar Dragan Turković.
- Zdenkovac, a village in the Čaglin Municipality, was named after Zdenko Turković.
- The elementary school in Kutjevo is named after Zdenko Turković.
- Two streets in Slavonia are named after Zdenko Turković, located in Kutjevo and Požega.
- A street located in Sesvete (city district of Zagreb) was named after Greta Turković-Srića, a Zdenko's wife.

== See also ==
- List of noble families of Croatia
- Turković
