= List of Rotarians =

Rotary International is an international service organization based in Evanston, Illinois, US. Members of Rotary clubs are called "Rotarians." This is a list of notable current and former active and honorary members of Rotary International clubs:

== A ==
- Thomas Burton Adams, Jr., Lieutenant Governor of Florida (1971–75)
- Filip Albrecht, Czech-German lyricist, manager, film producer and writer, Rotary Club Prague International, Czech Republic
- Clinton Presba Anderson, US Secretary of Agriculture and Senator from New Mexico, former Rotary president
- Prince Andrew of Yugoslavia, youngest child of King Alexander I of Yugoslavia.
- Neil Armstrong, First astronaut to walk on the Moon, Rotary Club of Wapakoneta, OH
- Ásgeir Ásgeirsson, President of Iceland, Rotary Club of Reykjavík
- Prince Axel of Denmark, Prince of Denmark and businessman, Rotary Club of Copenhagen

== B ==
- Kalyan Banerjee, chemical engineer, former Rotary International President
- Françoise Barré-Sinoussi, isolated the aids virus at the Pasteur Institute, Paul Harris Fellow, Rotary Club of La Rochelle-Aunis, France
- Edvard Beneš, President of Czechoslovakia, Rotary Club of Prague, Czechoslovakia
- David M. Bennett, Co-founder of Mollie Stone's Markets
- Friedrich Bergius, PhD, Nobel Prize for Chemistry, invented method synthetic fuel from coal,
- Prince Bernhard of Lippe-Biesterfeld, Prince of the Netherlands, Rotary Club of Amsterdam, Netherlands
- Clarence Birdseye, II, invented method for fast freezing food, Rotary Club of Gloucester, MA
- William Jennings Bryan, US House of Representatives 1891–95, US Secretary of State 1913–15, US Presidential candidate, Rotary Club of Lincoln, Nebraska
- Richard E. Byrd Rear Admiral USN, Medal of Honor recipient, North and South Pole explorer, Rotary Club of Winchester, VA

== C ==
- Carlos Canseco, physician and philanthropist, Belisario Domínguez Medal of Honor laureate, former RI President
- Charles III, Charles Philip Arthur George, Honorary member of Rotary Club of Banchory-Ternan, Scotland, UK since 15 September 1992, King Charles III
- Jean-Claude Chermann, isolated the aids virus at the Pasteur Institute, Paul Harris Fellow, Rotary Club of La Rochelle-Aunis D1690, France
- Winston Churchill Sir, Prime Minister England, Rotary Club of London
- Arthur Compton, Nobel Prize for Physics for the particle nature of electromagnetic radiation, Rotary Club of St Louis, Missouri
- Guy Crescent, businessman, Rotary Club of Paris
- J. Howard Crocker, Canadian educator and sports executive for the YMCA and Amateur Athletic Union of Canada

== D ==
- Walt Disney, Animation filmmaker, Honorary member Rotary Club of Palm Springs, CA

== E ==
- Thomas Edison, Inventor and businessman, Honorary member Rotary Club of Orange, New Jersey
- Richard L. Evans, Mormon apostle and radio presenter (Music and the Spoken Word), former RI president

== F ==
- Cyrus Fees, Host of Bare Knuckle Fighting Championship, former ring announcer for Ultimate Fighting Championship, Rotary Club of Johnson City, TN.
- Dianne Feinstein, US Senator from California, Rotary Club of San Francisco, CA
- Doug Ford, Premier of Ontario, Canada.
- Gerald R. Ford, US President, Rotary Club of Grand Rapids, MI
- Suleiman Frangieh, President of Lebanon 1969–75, founded the Rotary Club of Tripoli, Lebanon 1950
- Pope Francis, Head of the Catholic Church, Bishop of Rome

== G ==
- W. B. George (1899–1972), Governor of District 250 of Rotary International for 1956–57, president of the Kemptville Rotary Club and the Canadian Amateur Hockey Association
- W. R. Granger (1873–1925), Rotary Club of Montreal member, businessman and Canadian Amateur Hockey Association president
- Sir Nigel Gresley, Locomotive designer and engineer, founder of Rotary Club of Doncaster, Britain
- Doug Grimston (1900–1955), president of the New Westminster Rotary Club and the Canadian Amateur Hockey Association
- Edgar Guest, American poet, Contributor to the Rotarian magazine, Rotary Club of Detroit, MI
- Elbert Guillory, Louisiana politician

== H ==
- Joyce Hall, Founder of Hallmark Cards, Rotary Club of Kansas City, Missouri
- Warren G. Harding, US President. Rotary Club of Washington, D.C.
- Paul P. Harris, founder of Rotary International, first RI President 1910–12, Rotary Club of Chicago, IL
- Mark Hatfield, Governor, Secretary of State, Representative, Senator in Oregon, Rotary Club of Eugene, OR
- Luther H. Hodges, US Secretary of Commerce and Governor of North Carolina, RI President 1967–68
- Thomas Frederick Hope, General Manager and Chief Engineer of the Guma Valley Company

== I ==
- James Innes, British entrepreneur, author and philanthropist, Rotary Club of London, England

== J ==
- Sheik-Umarr Mikailu Jah, Former Minister of Health of Sierra Leone, and founder of Rotary Club Bo, Sierra Leone
- John Jakes pen name Jay Scotland, author of "North and South Trilogy"
- Edmund Jones, Pennsylvania State Representative, 70+ year member of Rotary Clubs of Chester, Pennsylvania and Swarthmore, Pennsylvania

== K ==
- Duke Kahanamoku, US Olympic gold medalist, called "Father of Surfing", Rotary Club of Honolulu, HI
- John F. Kennedy, US President, Rotary Club of Hyannis, Massachusetts
- Shoaib Sultan Khan, pioneer of Rural Development in South Asia
- Spencer W. Kimball, former president of the Church of Jesus Christ of Latter-day Saints
- Sir Harry Lauder born Henry, vaudeville comedian, Rotary Club of Glasgow, Scotland

== L ==
- Jack Guy Lafontant, Prime Minister of Haiti, current President of the Rotary Club of Petion-Ville, Haiti
- Franz Lehár, Operetta composer, tried to prevent murder of Fritz Löhner-Beda in Auschwitz-III prison camp, Rotary Club of Vienna, Austria
- Dr. Fritz Löhner-Beda, librettist, lyricist, writer, Nazi concentration camp prisoner—died in Monowitz, Auschwitz-III, lawyer, wrote Rotary Hymne, Rotary Club of Vienna, Austria
- Dr. Guia Lopez de Leon, known also for her Nightingale Project, is the Transforming President of the Rotary Club of San Pedro South, Laguna, Philippines
- Richard Lugar, US Senator from Indiana, at age 25 joined Rotary Club of Indianapolis, IN

== M ==
- Malala Yousafzai, Pakistani women's education advocate spokesperson for the Malala Fund, Rotary, Swat, Pakistan
- Thomas Mann, German Novelist Nobel Prize in Literature 1929, The Rotary Club of Munich, Germany
- Guglielmo Marconi, Inventor of the viable wireless radio, Rotary Club of Bologna, Italy
- Jan Masaryk, Foreign minister of Czechoslovakia from 1940–48
- Dr. Charles H. Mayo, co-founder of the Mayo Clinic, Rotary Club of Rochester, Minnesota
- Kōnosuke Matsushita, founded Matsushita Electric Company Panasonic, Rotary Club of Osaka, Japan
- Connie Mack, nee Cornelius McGillicuddy, American professional baseball player, manager, and team owner, five times World Series Winner
- George S. Messersmith, US Diplomat in Germany, Austria, Cuba, Mexico, and Argentina
- Arch A. Moore, Jr., West Virginia governor
- Lorraine H. Morton, first African-American and long serving mayor of Evanston, Illinois
- Wayne Morse, US Senator Oregon, 1945–69, Rotary Club of Eugene, OR

== N ==
- Lennart Nilsson, Swedish photojournalist, Emmy winner, Rotary Club of Stockholm, Sweden

== O ==
- Judith O'Fallon, American statistician

== P ==
- Manny Pacquiao (Emmanuel Dapidaran Pacquiao), world boxing champion, Philippine senator, Rotary Club of Manila, Philippines
- Norman Vincent Peale, author of The Power of Positive Thinking, minister, motivational speaker, RI Public Relations Committee, Rotary Club of New York, NY
- James Cash Penney, founder of the J.C. Penney's department stores, Rotary Club of New York, NY
- Emilio Pucci, fashion designer and politician, Rotary Club of Florence, Italy
- Roberto Pontremoli, the founder of the Rotary Club International of Milan, is an important italian insurer.
- Alan Priddy PHF, sailor and philanthropist, England

== R ==
- Sir Clem Renouf, Australian accountant, Rotary Club of Nambour, Queensland; President, Rotary International 1978-79
- Giuseppe Resnati, Italian chemist, founded the Rotary Club of Morimondo Abbazia, Italy
- Frank Richman, Justice of the Indiana Supreme Court, Nuremberg trials judge, charter member and President of the Rotary Club of Columbus, IN
- James Whitcomb Riley, pen names: Benjamin P. Johnson of Boone, Jay Whit, Uncle Sidney, US poet, Rotary Club of Indianapolis, IN
- Sigmund Romberg, Opera composer, Rotary Club of New York, NY
- Carlos P. Romulo, Philippine Brigadier General WWII, Ambassador of the Philippines to the US, President of the 4th session of the United Nations 1949 and permanent member, Director of RI
- Franklin D. Roosevelt, US President, Rotary Club of Albany, NY
- James Roosevelt, son of US President Franklin Delano Roosevelt, Secretary to the President, US House of Representatives for California
- Jack Roxburgh, politician, farmer and president of the Canadian Amateur Hockey Association

== S ==
- Charles "Chic" Sale, actor: vaudeville, stage, screen, Rotary Club of Scarsdale, NY
- Joseph James "Jay" Salvador, President of Rotary Club of Central Tarlac (RY 2024-2025) of District 3790
- Frank Sandercock (1887–1942), president of the Canadian Amateur Hockey Association
- Harland Sanders a.k.a. Colonel Sanders, founder of Kentucky Fried Chicken, founding member of Rotary Club of Jeffersonville, IN in 1919, then the Rotary Club of Corbin, Kentucky, then Rotary Club of Shelbyville, Kentucky until his death in 1980
- Ian Scott, founder of Australian Rotary Health
- Harry Gordon Selfridge, American retail magnate founded London-based department store Selfridges, Rotary Club of London, England
- Jean Sibelius, Composer, Rotary Club of Helsinki-Helsingfors, Finland
- Giacomo Simoncini, Sammarinese Sammarinese sports executive and politician, President of Rotaract Club of San Marino
- Tris Speaker, nee Tristram E. Speaker, US baseball player and manager, 3x World Series Champ, MVP
- Sigmund Sternberg, directory of the Sternberg Centre for Judaism, Rotary Club of London
- Adlai Stevenson, former US Ambassador to the UN and former governor of Illinois, Rotary Club of Springfield, IL

== T ==
- Sakuji Tanaka, President of Rotary International 2012–13, Businessperson and Foundations, Rotary Club of Yashio, Saitama, Japan
- J. Millard Tawes John, State Treasurer, Comptroller, and Governor of Maryland, Rotary Club of Crisfield, MD
- Herbert J. Taylor, businessperson, civic leader and member of several Christian fraternities, RI President 1954–55, wrote the Rotary Four-Way Test for his business, Rotary Club of Chicago, IL
- Sidney Toler, actor (2nd non-Asian Charlie Chan), playwright, director
- Iyesato Tokugawa president of Japan's upper house of Congress for 30 years and the Honorary Keynote Speaker for Rotary's Silver Anniversary (25th) Convention/Celebration held in Chicago in 1930.
- Milan Turković, businessperson and nobleman, president of Rotary Club of Sušak
- Brian Triger, CEO of Triger Media, Ward 1 Councilmember for Midwest City, Oklahoma, and President of the Rotary Club of the Original Mile.

== W ==
- Charles Rudolph Walgreen Jr., President of Walgreens, Rotary Club of Chicago, IL
- Sam Walton, founder of Wal-Mart, Rotary Club of Bentonville, Arkansas
- Earl Warren, Chief Justice of the US Supreme Court
- William Allen White, American newspaper editor, politician, author, and leader of the Progressive movement, Rotary Club of Emporia, Kansas
- Woodrow Wilson, US President and Nobel Prize in Peace, Rotary Club of Birmingham, AL
- Jack Williamson, PhD, pen names: Will Stewart, Nils O. Sonderlund, prolific Science Fiction author, Rotary Club of Portales, NM
- Orville Wright, Co-Inventor of the first successful airplane, Rotary Club of Dayton, OH

== Y ==
- Yen Chia-kan westernized Chia Kan C.K. Yen, President of Taiwan Republic of China
- Yoo Chang-soon westernized Chang Soon Yoo, Prime Minister of the Fifth Republic of South Korea, Rotary Club of Hanyang, South Korea
