= Ilica =

Ilica may refer to:

- Ilica (street), one of the best known streets in downtown Zagreb, Croatia
- Ilica (typeface), a typeface designed for street signs and house number plates in Zagreb, Croatia
- Ilıca (disambiguation), several places in Turkey
