= Petar Turković =

Croatian psychologist, master of martial arts and sports executive (born 1957)

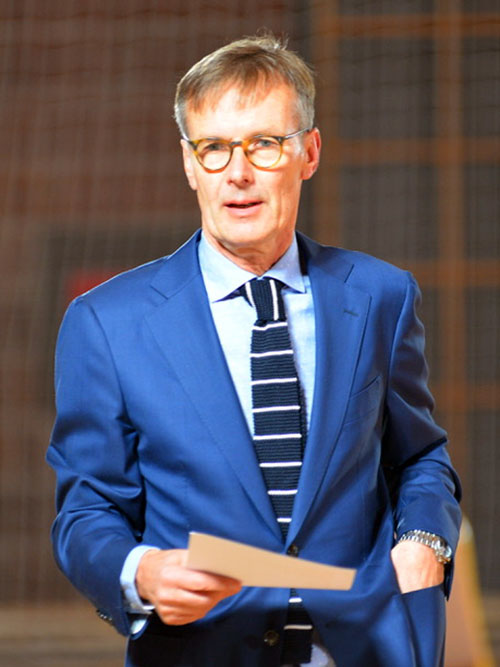
- Turković in 2018
- Born: 1 November 1957 (age 68); Zagreb, PR Croatia, Yugoslavia (now Croatia)
- Education: University of Zagreb
- Occupations: clinical psychologist; psychotherapist; social entrepreneur; master of martial arts; sports executive
- Years active: 1982–present
- Children: 2; including Nika
- Family: Turković of Kutjevo

Vice-president of Croatian Olympic Committee
- In office 21 October 2000 – 3 October 2002 Serving with Ivo Goran Munivrana and Luciano Sušanj
- President: Zdravko Hebel
- Sports career
- Years active: 1971–1987, 1995
- Country: Yugoslavia (1971–1987); Croatia (1995)
- Sport: Karate; nanbudo; kart racing
- Rank: 8th-degree red belt in Nanbudo (Hanshi); 3rd-degree black belt in Karate

Petar Turković (born 1 November 1957) is a Croatian clinical psychologist, psychotherapist, social entrepreneur, master of martial arts, and sports executive. He was a long-time Vinko Bek Education Centre for Blind director and Croatian Olympic Committee vice president. Currently, he serves as the executive director of the Croatian Nanbudo Federation and the Croatian Wushu Federation, as well as the general secretary of the International Nanbudo Federation and the Wushu and Kungfu Federation of Europe.

== Family and education ==
Petar Turković was born on 1 November 1957 in Zagreb, PR Croatia, Yugoslavia (now Croatia). He comes from the Turković baronial family of Kutjevo. His great-great-grandfather Vjenceslav was a successful wood and grain merchant in Karlovac in the second half of the 19th century. He also advanced the operations of the inherited Kraljevica Shipyard and bought the agricultural Kutjevo Estate in 1882. His great-grandfather Baron Petar Dragan was one of the founders and chairman of Croatian Discount Bank and founder and chairman of brewery Zagrebačka pivovara. He was also the grand prefect of Zagreb County. His other great-grandfather was Ritter Josip Gorup of Slavina, a Slovenian industrialist, politician, and patron.

Turković earned his degree in clinical psychology from the University of Zagreb in 1981 and his master's degree in psychotherapy in 1994. In addition, he obtained degrees in organizational psychology and cybernetics. He is one of the first certified teachers of the School of Cybernetics of Psychotherapy at the University Hospital Centre Zagreb.

Turković is married with two daughters, Nika (born 1995) and Kiara (born 1999). A singer-songwriter, Nika released two studio albums as of 2023 and represented Croatia at the Junior Eurovision Song Contest in 2004. A medical graduate, Kiara is a nanbudo practitioner and won a gold medal in an individual kata event at the 2022 Nanbudo World Championship.

== Professional career ==
After completing his studies in psychology, Turković commenced his career as a psychotherapist at health centres in Velika Gorica and Zagreb, where he served until 1990. He then served as a human resources officer at Chromos, a Croatian paints and coatings manufacturer, for two years.

From 1992 to 2005, Turković held the director position at the Vinko Bek Education Centre for Blind (Croatian: Centar za odgoj i obrazovanje "Vinko Bek"), a Zagreb-based institution for primary, secondary, and music education programs and psychosocial rehabilitation for visually impaired children. In 1992, he initiated the Sight of Hope project, initially as director and subsequently as president of the administrative board. The project involved the establishment of a social welfare institution called Mala Kuća (transl. Small House) to cater to visually impaired children. The institution has since expanded into a daycare centre known as Mali Dom (transl. Small Home). Turković managed this center until 2005.

In 1997, Turković received the Homeland War Memorial Medal. Two years later, he was appointed an advisor to Croatian politician Stjepan Mesić and served as campaign co-manager during the 2000 Croatian presidential election. Mesić's successful campaign resulted in him becoming the second President of Croatia. For several years, Turković was a participant and facilitator in Forums organized by the Tällberg Foundation from Sweden.

In 1999, Turković established and served as director of the Foundation 2020 (Croatian: Zaklada 2020), a Croatian think tank dedicated to envisioning the future of Croatian society. In the initial years of the Foundation's work, Turković led Creatia Croatia 2010 project, which focused on the strategic planning of Croatia's future. As part of this project, Turković organized an international conference in Brijuni in 2004, titled How We Can Trust Each Other, which was attended by statesmen such as Croatian President Mesić, Slovenian President Janez Drnovšek, President of the Presidency of Bosnia and Herzegovina Sulejman Tihić, and President of Montenegro Filip Vujanović. In 2006, Turković organized another conference in Plitvička Jezera entitled How Croatian Economy Can Contribute to European Union. He headed the Foundation 2020 until 2016 when he worked towards realizing its vision of collaboration and innovation.

== Sports career ==
=== Martial arts ===
Turković began his martial arts career in 1971 when he started practising karate. After five years, he won a gold medal at the Karate Junior Championship of SR Croatia. He has a 3rd-degree black belt in karate. After karate, he shifted his focus to promoting and developing nanbudo and wushu in Croatia.

Nanbudo

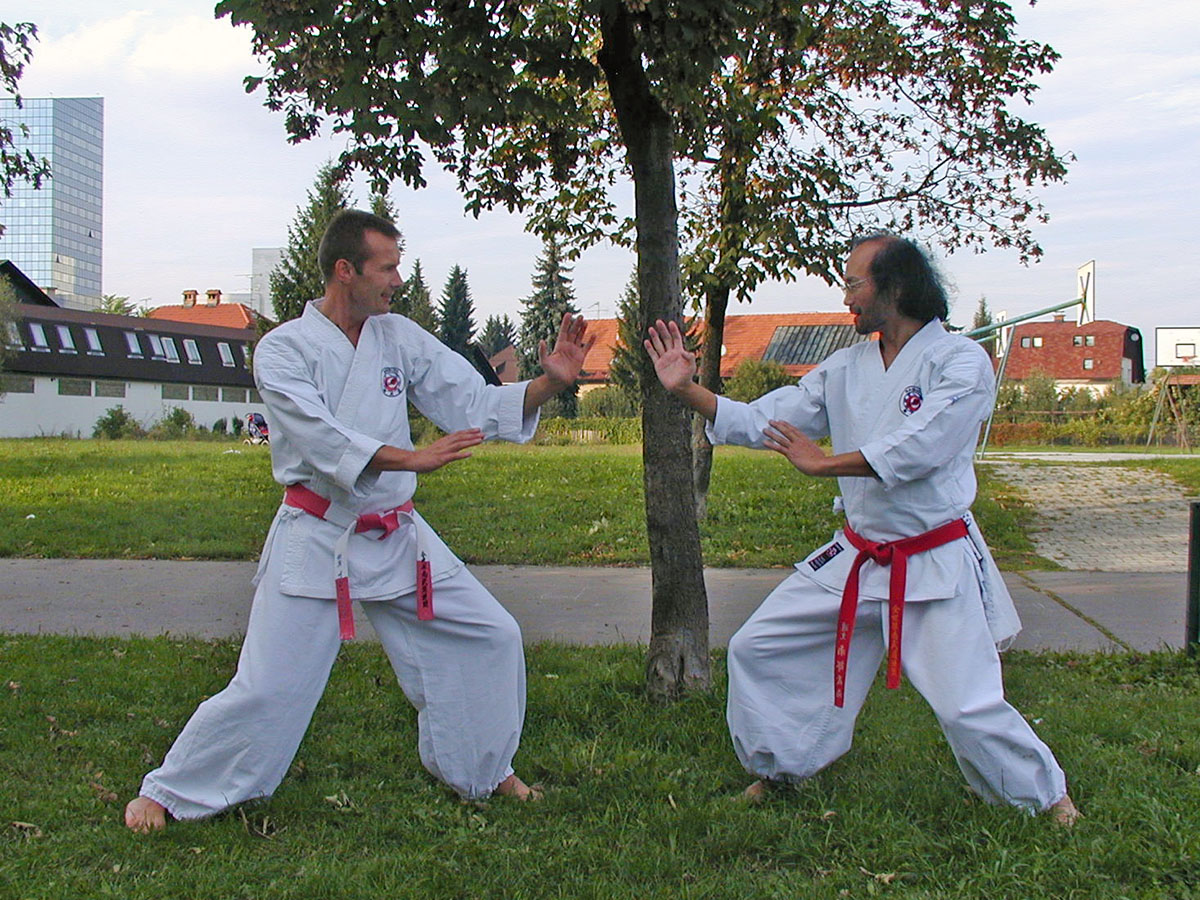
Turković (left) and Yoshinao Nanbu (right) practicing nanbudo in 2007.

Turković founded the Gradec Nanbudo Club in Zagreb in 1978, named after the old part of Zagreb. It was the first nanbudo sports club in Croatia. In 1985, he organized the first international nanbudo seminar in Croatia, which will continue to be organized yearly. He also achieved the 8th-degree red belt and earned the honorific title Hanshi. Turković competed in the first Nanbudo World Championship in Monte Carlo, Monaco, in 1987, after which he retired from his competitive career.

In 1989, after establishing two additional clubs in SR Croatia, the requirements were met for forming a national federation. Initially known as the Yugoslav Nanbudo Institute, the organization was later renamed the Croatian Nanbudo Institute following Croatia's declaration of independence. Eventually, it came to be known as the Croatian Nanbudo Federation. One of the founders of the federation, Turković, was appointed as its executive director. In 1991, the Croatian federation became a member of the World Nanbudo Federation, facilitating its participation in global competitions. Turković led the Croatian national team, which took part in the World Championship in Barcelona, Spain, in 1991 as the first Croatian team to compete under their flag and name. The team's outstanding performance saw them win one silver and three gold medals, a remarkable achievement for a fledgling national team.

Turković's contribution to nanbudo extended beyond Croatia's borders when he was elected as the general secretary of the World Nanbudo Federation in 1998, serving until 2003. In 2010, he participated in founding the International Nanbudo Federation and was elected as its secretary-general.

Turković wrote two books about the nanbudo sport.

Wushu

In 2008, Turković was one of the founders of the Croatian Wushu Federation and was appointed executive director thereof. Within the framework of the federation, he headed two projects that were financed by the European Erasmus Programme.

In 2013, Turković participated in the founding of the Balkan Regional Wushu Federation and was elected its vice president at the constituent session in Istanbul, Turkey. He also participated in the founding of the European Wushu Federation in 2020 and was appointed secretary-general at the constituent session in Brussels, Belgium.

In June 2023, a new European federation for wushu and kungfu was formed, the Wushu and Kungfu Federation of Europe, which was created by the merger of the European Wushu Federation (est. 2020) and the European Wushu and Kungfu Federation (est. 1985). Turković was elected secretary general of the new federation.

=== Other ===
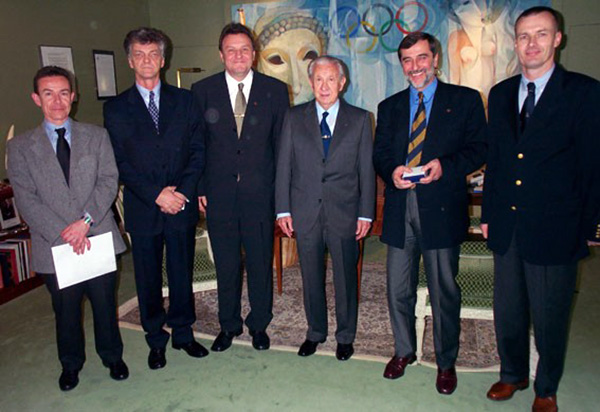
Turković (right) with the delegation of the HOO at a meeting with Juan Antonio Samaranch, president of the IOC, in Lausanne, 2000

Besides martial arts, Turković did kart racing and won several titles in this motorsport. He won the Croatian Karting Championship title twice, in 1981 and 1982 and became a runner-up in 1995.

Moreover, Turković's contributions to sports in Croatia extend beyond his achievements. From 2000 to 2002, he served as the vice president of the Croatian Olympic Committee (HOO). In 2022, at the 19th Winter Olympic Games in Salt Lake City, he was a NOC member with the Croatian delegation.

Turković's expertise and experience in sports led him to be appointed by Croatian President Stjepan Mesić as the head of the group responsible for drafting proposals for Croatian sports strategy in 2000. He collaborated with distinguished sportspeople such as Andrija Mijačika, Željko Mataja, and Mihovil Nakić.

In 2015, Turković also played a significant role in forming SportREcognized, an association of international sports federations, where he serves as the vice president.

== Bibliography ==
- Centar "Vinko Bek": 1895–1995.; English translation: Vinko Bek Center: 1895–1995; editor Petar Turković, (1997, Zagreb)
- Uvod u nanbudo: vještina, šport, zdrav stil života; English translation: Introduction to Nanbudo: Skill, Sport, Healthy Lifestyle; (1997, Zagreb, ISBN 953-97025-1-8)
- Nanbudo: 40 godina Nanbudo kluba Gradec i nanbudo sporta u Hrvatskoj; English translation: Nanbudo: 40 years of Gradec Nanbudo Club and nanbudo sport in Croatia; (2018, Zagreb, ISBN 978-953-48322-0-2)

Sporting positions
Preceded by Zdravko Hebel	Vice president of Croatian Olympic Committee; 2000–2002; With: Ivo Goran Munivrana; Luciano Sušanj	Succeeded by Goranko Fižulić; Nikola Švigir
Preceded by Giuseppe Ferrara	Secretary-general of World Nanbudo Federation; 1998–2003	Position abolished
First	Secretary-general of International Nanbudo Federation; 2010–present	Incumbent
First	Secretary-general of European Wushu Federation; 2020–present	Incumbent
First	Vice president of Balkan Regional Wushu Federation; 2013–2015	Succeeded by Mustafa Ulu
First	Executive director of Croatian Nanbudo Federation; 1989–present	Incumbent
First	Executive director of Croatian Wushu Federation; 2008–present	Incumbent
Civic offices
Preceded by Josip Krušlin	Director of Vinko Bek Education Center for Blind; 1992–2005	Succeeded by Diana Kralj
