= Milan Turković =

Milan Turković may refer to:

- Milan Turković (businessperson) (1857–1937), Croatian businessman and nobleman
- Milan Turković (musician) (born 1939), Austrian-Croatian classical bassoonist and conductor
