= Beer in Croatia =

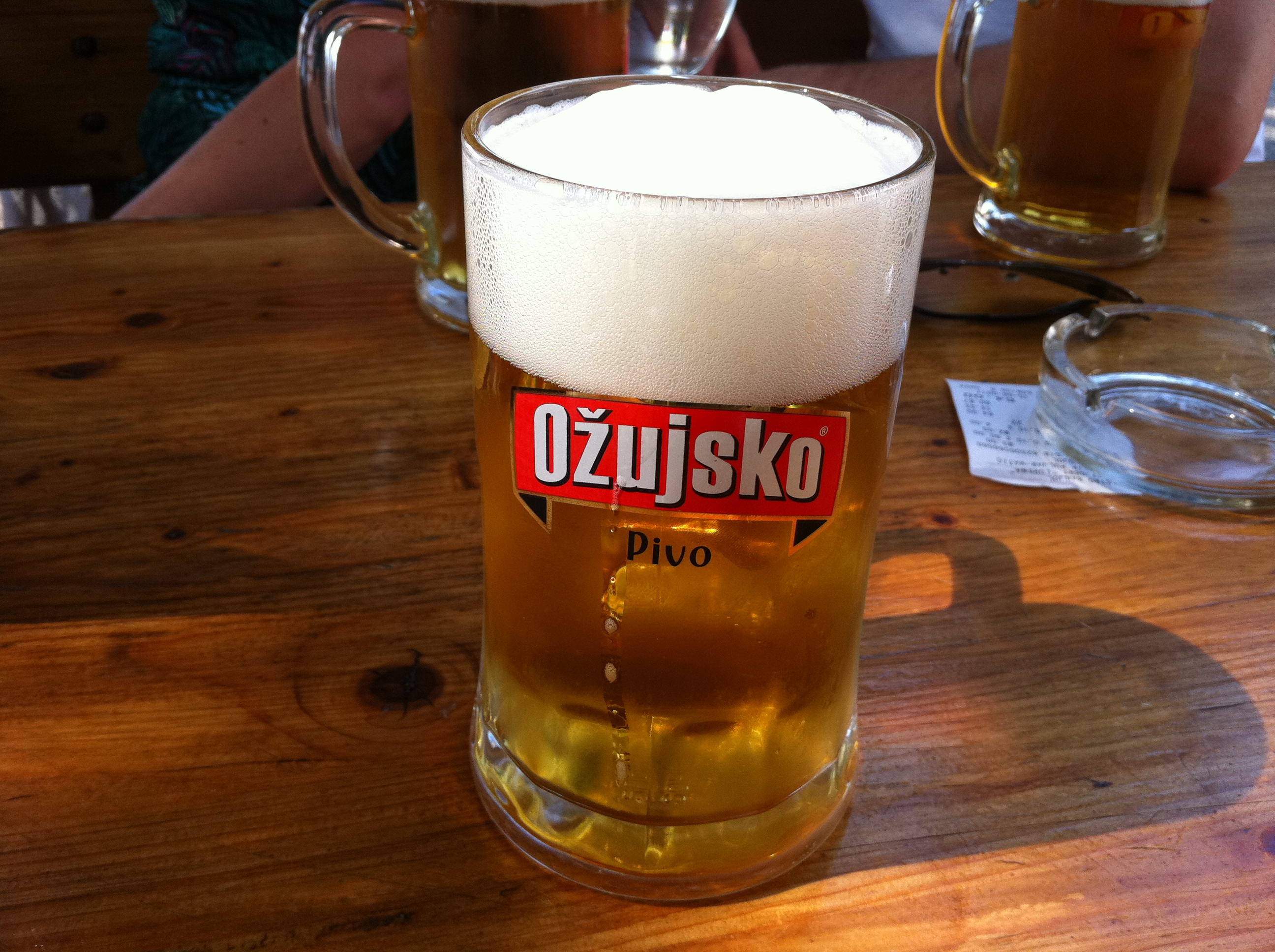
Ožujsko is the most popular beer brand in Croatia

Beer is a popular beverage in Croatia. In 2010, Croatia was the 14th country in the world by beer consumption per capita. Approximately one half of the adult population are beer consumers.

== History ==
During antiquity and the Middle Ages, beer in Croatia received only sporadic mentions in historical sources, unlike Croatian wine. Its popularity rose in the 18th century, and industrial-scale production began only in the late 19th century. In the modern era, brewing has gained significant economic importance, generating a total of 2.4 billion HRK (c. €320 million) of revenue in 2007.

== Beer production and consumption ==
More than 90% of all beer sold in Croatia is domestically produced. There are many types and brands of beer in Croatia, though more than 90% of revenue is shared among six largest beer companies. The most popular beer is Ožujsko and the second most popular is Karlovačko. As of 2010s, there is a rising trend of craft beer consumption.

== Brands ==
=== Osječko ===
Osječko is the first Croatian beer ever produced, and has been produced since 1697. The main factory is located in Osijek, from which the beer got its name.

=== Karlovačko ===
Karlovačko is the second most popular beer in Croatia. It is also the national beer. This is due to the rapid marketing of the product after it was released. The factory is located in the city of Karlovac, which is where it gets its name. Since 2016, it has been owned by Heineken.

=== Ožujsko ===
Ožujsko is the most popular beer in Croatia, with 10 bottles being consumed every second. It has been produced since 1892. The main factory is in Zagreb. As of 2012, the Ožujsko brand is now part of the MolsonCoors brewing company.

=== Pan ===
Pan is a Carlsberg-owned beer company which has a variety of beers in the market, including lager, light, and lemon beer.

=== Laško ===
Laško is a beer company, which is headquartered in Slovenia, but the beer is still popular in Croatia. There is a new factory in Split that produces the beer, but it is hard to find in Croatia. As of 2016 Laško is owned by the Heineken Brewing Company along with fellow Slovenian brand Union.

=== Tomislav ===
Tomislav is the second strongest beer in Croatia, with a 7.3% alcohol content (The strongest is Grička Vještica with 7.5%). It's brewed by Zagrebačka pivovara like Ožujsko brands

=== Velebitsko ===
Velebitsko is a popular beer brand from Croatia, brewed near Gospić on the Velebit mountains in Lika by the Pivovara Ličanka. The name is used for the pale lager which has an alcohol content of 5.1% and for the dark lager which has an alcohol content of 6.0%.

=== Tars ===
Tars is the first real beer from Rijeka, brewed by Kaltenberg Adria brewery in Kukuljanovo. Tars is a lager produced according to the Bavarian purity law, Reinheitsgebot. The name of Tars comes from Tarsatica - the old part of Rijeka rising on a hill over the Rječina river.

== See also ==
- Croatian wine
- Rakija
