= Petar Dragan Turković =

Croatian businessman and nobleman (1855–1916)

- Baron of Kutjevo
- Born: 4 April 1855; Karlovac, Kingdom of Croatia, Austrian Empire
- Died: 2 April 1916 (aged 60); Kutjevo, Kingdom of Croatia-Slavonia, Austria-Hungary
- Noble family: Turković of Kutjevo
- Father: Vjenceslav Turković
- Occupation: merchant; business executive; banker; politician

Petar Dragan Turković (also credited as Petar Dragutin; 4 April 1855 – 2 April 1916), titled Baron Petar Dragan Turković of Kutjevo, was a Croatian businessman and nobleman from the Turković Kutjevski family.

== Biography ==
After gymnasium in Rakovec, Turković attended the Trade Academy in Trieste. Even as a young man, he had a managing role in his father's forest business. In 1882, Turković permanently settled in Kutjevo and continued his work on wooden products, the wood industry and building a family business. According to tradition, he entered his father's business at the end of the 1870s. In 1886, Turković managed the family business with his younger brother Milan, devoting himself mainly to exploiting oak trees and planting extensive vineyards, orchards and tobacco.

In 1894, Turković moved to Zagreb to deal with the administrative affairs of the Turković family estate. In addition, he had other essential roles in Zagreb. He was a member of the board of directors of the Zagreb Plinara (transl. Zagreb Gas Plant) and Tvornica kože (transl. Leather Factory), and the president of brewery Zagrebačka pivovara and of the Croatian Discount Bank. Turković was the founder of Zagrebačka pivovara together with Count Gustav Pongratz. His career peaked when he became the grand prefect of Zagreb County, where he was from 1906 to 1907. In 1911, he and his brother Milan were made barons by the Austrian Emperor Franz Joseph I.

Three years after his death, his sons founded the Turković Brothers Bank. The bank went liquidated after World War II. Also, the Peter Dragan Baron Turković Foundation went established by his son Vladimir in his name and on his brother's behalf under the patronage of Matica hrvatska.

== Family ==
Turković's wife was Marina Maja, née Tulić. They had three sons; Vladimir (born 1878), Davorin (b. 1883), and Velimir (b. 1894). His great-grandson is a clinical psychologist, Petar Turković, and his great-great-granddaughter is a singer-songwriter, Nika Turković.

== Legacy ==
- Draganlug, a village in the Čaglin Municipality, was named after Turković.
