= Milan Turković (businessman) =

Croatian businessman and nobleman (1857–1937)

- Baron of Kutjevo
- Born: Milan Emil Antun Viktor Turković; 4 February 1857; Karlovac, Kingdom of Croatia, Austrian Empire
- Died: 18 September 1937 (aged 80); Sušak, Rijeka, Yugoslavia
- Noble family: Turković of Kutjevo
- Father: Vjenceslav Turković
- Occupation: merchant; business executive; banker

Milan Emil Antun Viktor Turković (4 February 1857 – 18 September 1937), titled Baron Milan Turković of Kutjevo, was a Croatian businessman and nobleman from the Turković Kutjevski family.

== Biography ==
After completing his gymnasium education in Rakovec, Turković attended the Trade Academy in Trieste. From an early age, Turković played an active role in his father's forest business, where he honed his expertise in the wood industry. In 1882, Turković settled permanently in Kutjevo and focused on developing the family business, which specialized in wooden products. He and his older brother Petar Dragan managed the business, devoting themselves to exploiting oak trees and planting vast vineyards, orchards, and tobacco fields.

Following Petar Dragan's death in 1916, Turković moved to Zagreb and became influential in economic and cultural life. He served as the president of the Croatian Discount Bank, the Association of Foresters, and the Rescue Society. Additionally, he was a censor of the National Bank in Zagreb and helped found the Zagreb Philharmonic Orchestra, showcasing his passion for music.

Turković was awarded several prestigious honours throughout his lifetime. In 1901, he received the Order of the Legion of Honour (first degree). In 1911, he and his brother Petar Dragan were made barons by the Austrian Emperor Franz Joseph I. He received several awards from the Kingdom of Serbs, Croats and Slovenes, including the Order of St. Sava (third degree) in 1923, the Order of the White Eagle (fifth degree) in 1937, and the Order of the Yugoslav Crown (third degree) in 1933.

Furthermore, Turković was an active member of the Šušak Rotary Club and served as its first president.

== Family ==
Turković married Baroness Irena, the daughter of Baron Jovan Živković Fruškogorski, a longtime Vice-ban of Croatia and one of the authors of the Croatian–Hungarian Settlement. They had two sons; Zdenko (born 1892) and Fedor (b. 1894). Austrian classical bassoonist and conductor Milan Turković is his grandson.

== Legacy ==
- Milanlug, a village in the Čaglin Municipality, was named after Turković.

== See also ==
- List of Rotarians
