= Oktogon (Zagreb) =

Passageway in central Zagreb, Croatia

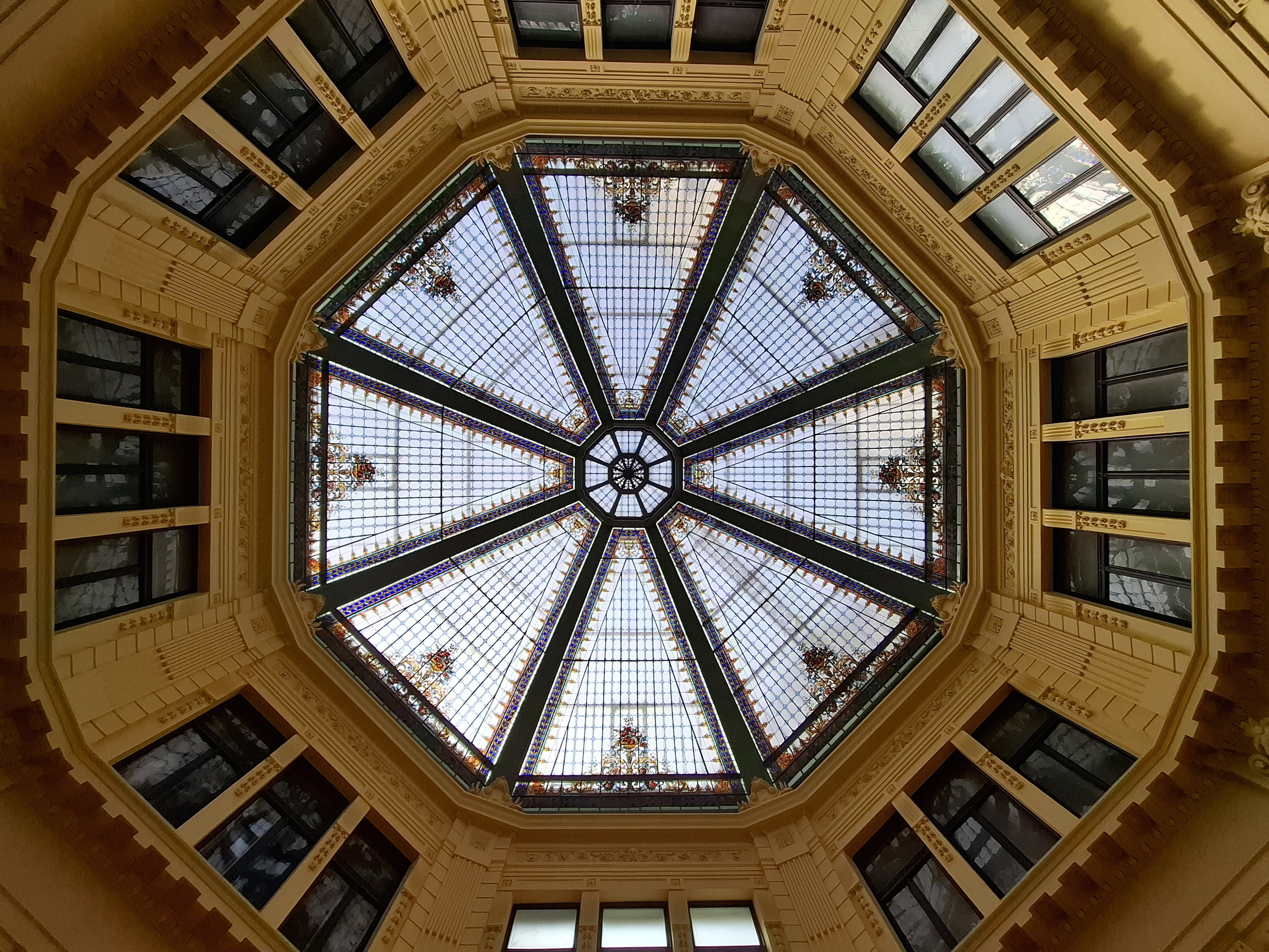
Oktogon atrium ceiling, 2025

Oktogon is an urban passageway in central Zagreb, Croatia, connecting Petar Preradović Square with Ilica street through the building of the former First Croatian Savings Bank. It was designed by architect Josip Vancaš and built as part of the savings bank building between 1898 and 1900. The structure consists of two passageways connecting a middle octagonal atrium (lending the passageway its name) to the city streets.

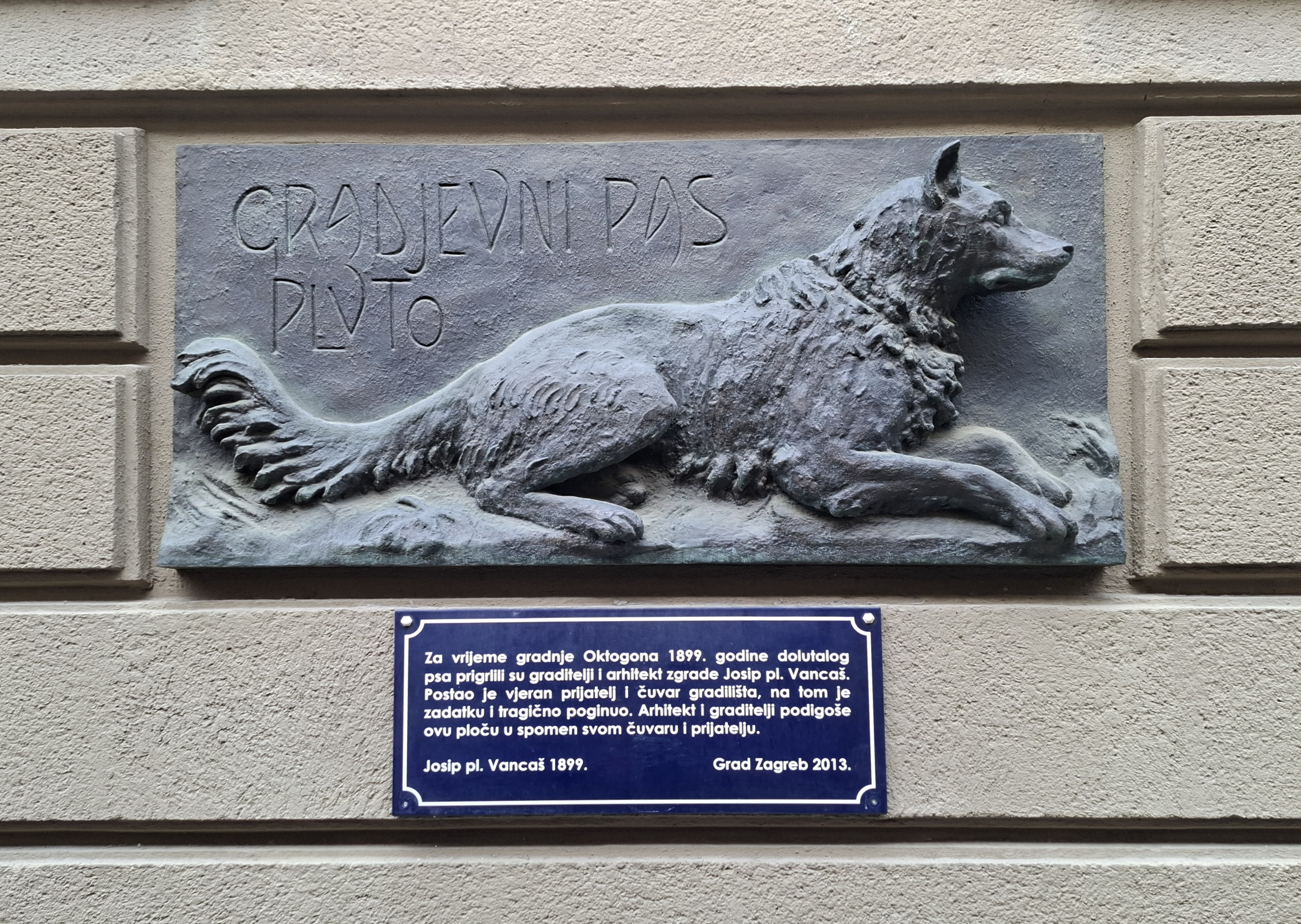
Plaque and monument dedicated to Pluto in Bogovićeva street (photographed in 2025)

The passage used to contain the only monument to a dog in Zagreb, hidden from view in the back yard. A stray dog called Pluto kept the workers company during the building of Oktogon and the surrounding building. The dog died around the end of the construction, and Vancaš and the workers decided to erect a basrelief in its memory. In 2013, the monument was moved to Mirko Bogović Street.
