= Croatian Discount Bank =

Former bank based in Zagreb

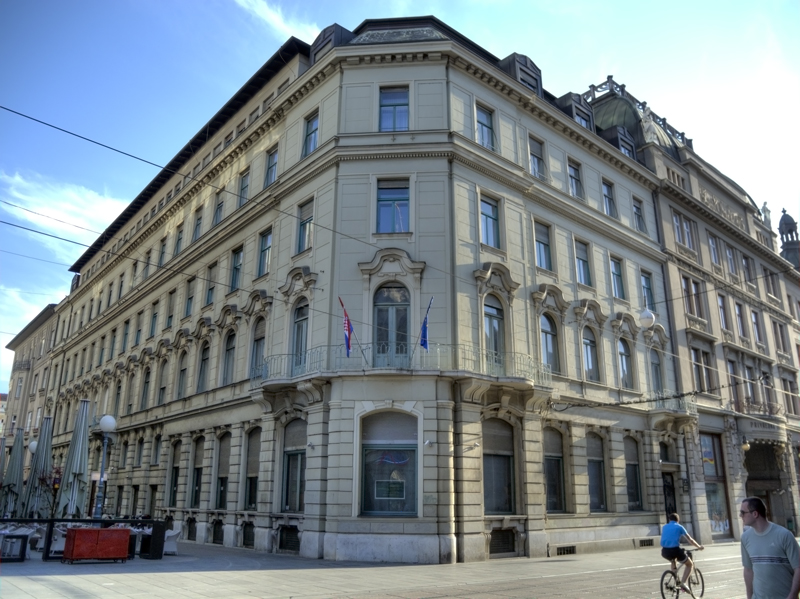
Former Head office on Ilica Street, Zagreb; later seat of the Croatian Bureau of Statistics

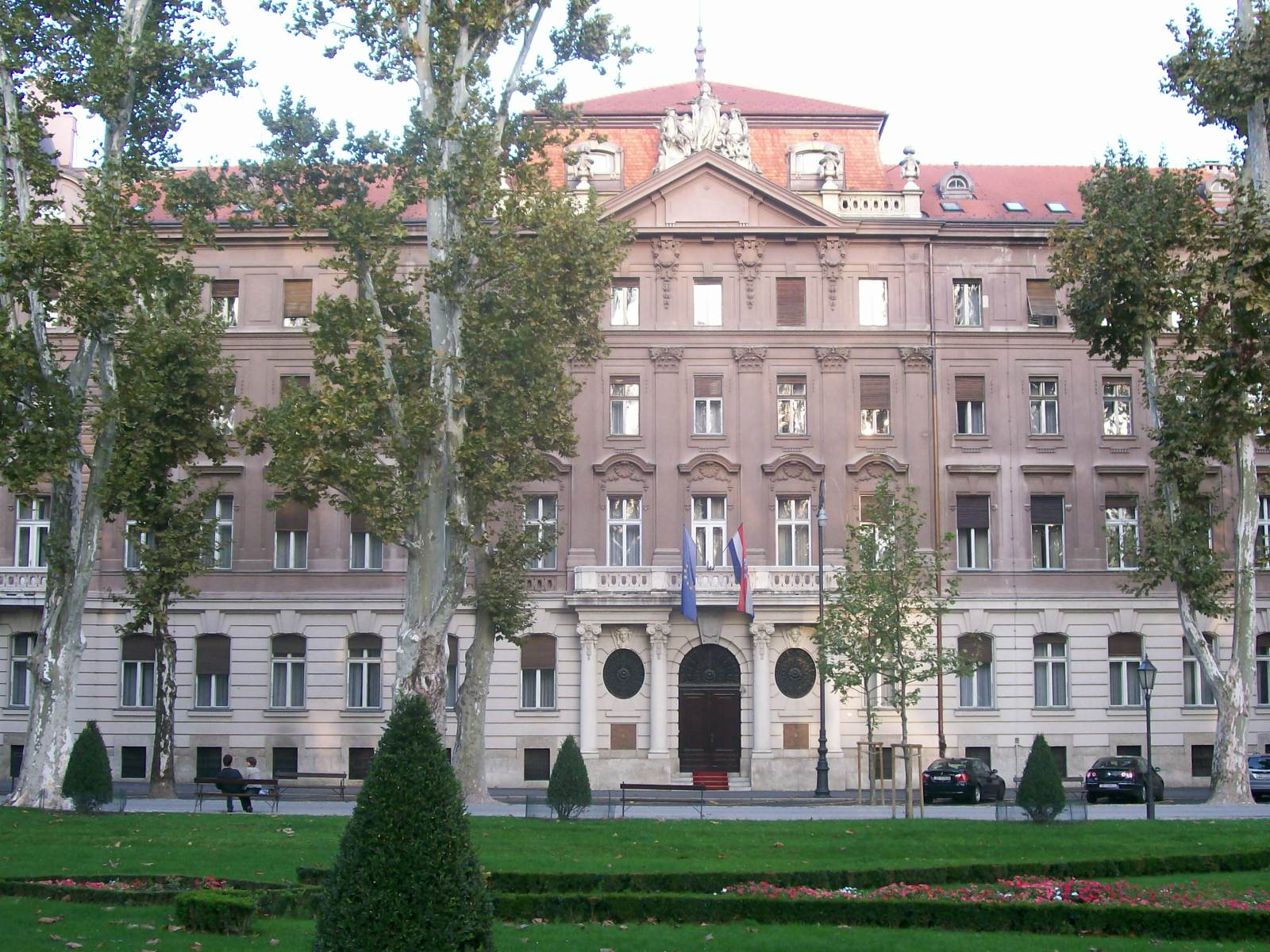
Former head office of the Croatian-Slavonian Land Mortgage Bank on Nikola Šubić Zrinski Square in Zagreb, from 1928 head office of Yugoslav United Bank, and later the seat of the Croatian Foreign Ministry

The Croatian Discount Bank (Croatian: Hrvatska eskomptna banka) was a significant bank headquartered in Zagreb, which was conceived in 1864 and started opetrations on 16 November 1868. It merged in 1928 with the Croatian-Slavonian Land Mortgage Bank (Croatian: Hrvatsko-slavonska zemaljska hipotekarna banka, est. 1892) to form the Yugoslav United Bank (Croatian: Jugoslavenska udružena banka, also Union banka). The latter was rebranded Croatian United Bank (Croatian: Hrvatska udružena banka) under the Independent State of Croatia in 1941. Its liquidation by the Communist authorities was initiated in late 1945 and completed in 1949.

== History ==
At its creation in 1868, the Croatian Discount Bank was the second large modern bank founded in what is now Croatia, following the establishment of the First Croatian Savings Bank in 1846. The Discount Bank had mostly local shareholders and was thus viewed as more straightforwardly aligned with Croatian interests than the First Croatian Savings Bank at that time. Guido Pongratz was instrumental in the creation of the new bank, which was later chaired by the brothers Petar Dragan Turković and Milan Turković. By 1924, it had branches in Dubrovnik, Križevci, Osijek, Petrinja, Sušak, and Vinkovci.

The Croatian-Slavonian Land Mortgage Bank was founded in Zagreb in 1892 with participation from the Hungarian Mortgage Credit Bank, the Hungarian Discount and Exchange Bank, and Vienna's Unionbank. It was granted a monopoly over mortgage operations and, by an act of the Croatian Parliament in 1894, the management of funds of all autonomous administrative bodies, which gave it a significant competitive advantage. In the 1920s, it was recapitalized by new domestic and foreign investors including Belgium's Solvay Group, the Berlin-based Disconto-Gesellschaft, Vienna-based Ephrussi and Company, and London-based Lazard Brothers.

In 1928, the two banks merged into an entity that was first named Croatian Discount and Mortgage Bank, then acquired two other banks, the Bosnian Bank (Serbo-Croatian: Bosanska Banka) in Belgrade and the Agrarian and Commercial Bank (Serbo-Croatian: Agrarna i komercijalna banka) in Sarajevo, at which time the name was changed to Yugoslav United Bank (sometimes also translated Yugoslav Union Bank). Following the merger, the principal shareholder of the Yugoslav United Bank was the Anglo-International Bank, with additional participations of Solvay and to a lesser extent of Banca Commerciale Italiana. The bank commissioned a modern Belgrade head office from architect Hugo Ehrlich, which was completed in 1930 and represents a significant landmark of architectural modernism in Yugoslavia; its executive management, however, remained in Zagreb. The bank, however, suffered heavily from the European banking crisis of 1931, similarly as the First Croatian Savings Bank, and was subsequently placed under moratorium.

In 1940, equity control of the Yugoslav United Bank was acquired by a group of Croatian investors. Following the German invasion of Yugoslavia, it retained its ownership structure but had to transfer its Belgrade branch to the German-controlled Bankverein AG Belgrad. It was eventually liquidated in 1945 together with the entire Yugoslavian commercial banking sector.

== See also ==
- First Croatian Savings Bank
- City Savings Bank of Zagreb
- List of banks in Croatia
- List of banks in Yugoslavia
