= Mollie Stone's Markets =

California supermarket chain

Albeco, Inc.
- Trade name: Mollie Stone's Markets
- Company type: Private Company
- Industry: Retail
- Founded: 1986 (40 years ago) in San Francisco, California, U.S.
- Headquarters: Mill Valley, California, U.S.
- Number of locations: 8
- Area served: Bay Area, California, United States
- Key people: Michael Stone (CEO)
- Products: Bakery, dairy, delicatessen, frozen foods, grocery, meat, produce, seafood, snacks, prepared foods
- Revenue: ▲$145.2 million (2019)
- Owner: (Stone Family (100%))
- Number of employees: 1,300 (2019)
- Website: www.molliestones.com

Albeco, Inc., doing business as Mollie Stone's Markets, operates a small chain of nine supermarkets, located in the San Francisco Bay Area. Established in 1986 by Mike Stone and Dave Bennett (now retired), it has stores in the cities of Burlingame, Greenbrae, Palo Alto, San Bruno, Sausalito, and the Castro, Pacific Heights, and Twin Peaks neighborhoods of San Francisco.

== History ==
Mollie Stone's was named after Michael Stone's mother Mollie, whose enthusiasm for making people feel good became the store's mission. Mollie worked in the grocery industry in Southern California for over two decades. In 1986, Mike Stone (current owner) and Dave Bennett (now retired) founded Mollie Stone's Markets with the goal of "making a difference in people's lives through food". Mollie Stone's first market was in Redwood City, California, where they carried only natural and organic products without added sugars. With demand not only for natural and organic produce, meats, and health and beauty products, but also more conventional wares such as vitamin-enriched cereals and name-brand products, Mollie Stone's shifted to the "Best of Both Worlds" system, offering these but still with a focus on healthy, natural, local, and specialty foods.

Due to its community-oriented nature, Mollie Stone's provides additional services to customers with the goal of making shopping easier. The Mollie Bus operates from the Castro and Pacific Heights locations to drive customers home with their groceries. The chain also has partnerships with Starbucks and Ace Hardware, having been the first ever grocery store with a Starbucks inside and the first in the Bay Area to include a complete hardware store.
