= Ilica (street) =

Street in Zagreb, Croatia

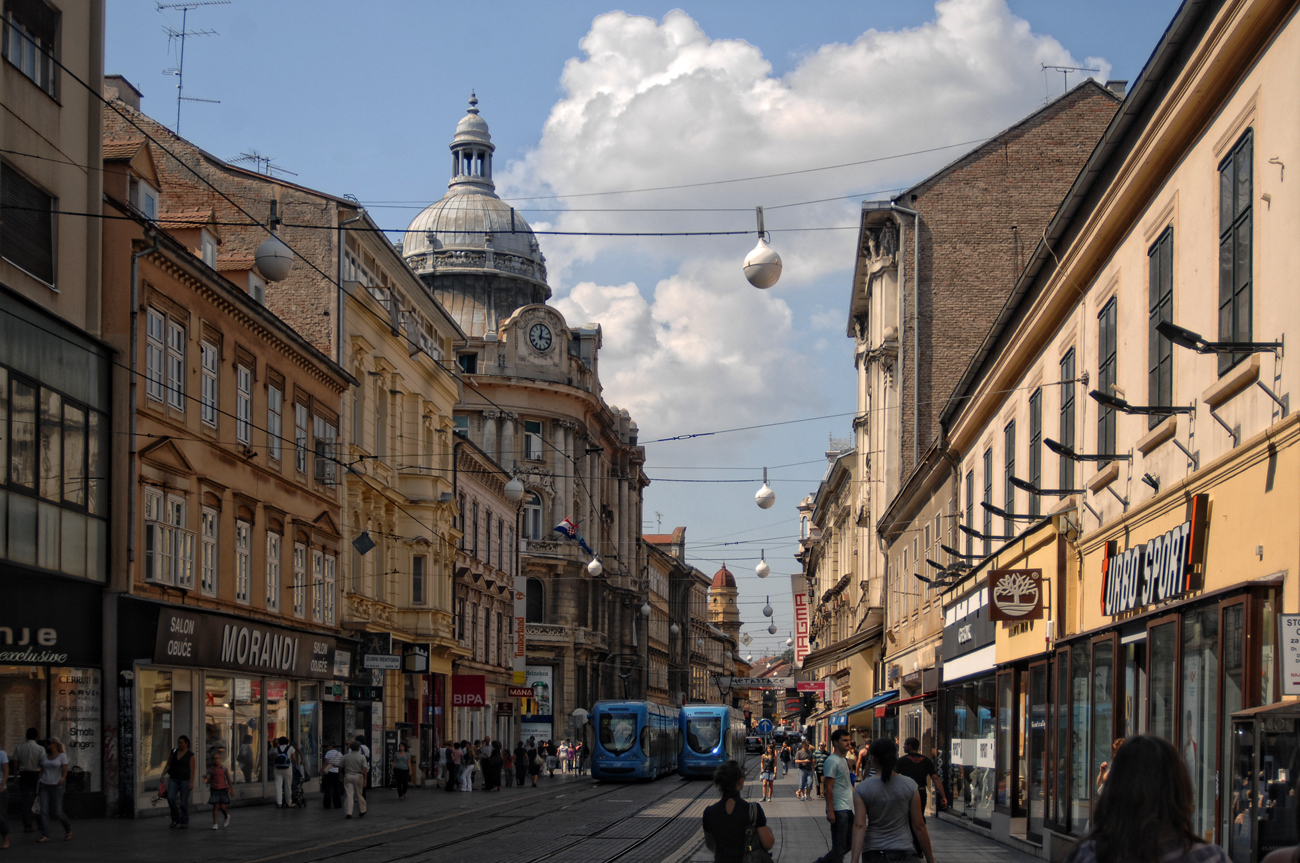
- Ilica near Ban Jelačić Square
- Interactive map of Ilica
- Former name: Lončarska ves
- Length: 5.6 km (3.5 mi)
- Coordinates: 45.8144857°N 15.9372849°E
- From: Vrapče train station
- To: Ban Jelačić Square

Ilica is one of the longest streets in Zagreb, Croatia. The busy street is home to many shops and cultural sites and spans through most of the northwestern part of the city, from the Ban Jelačić Square in the city centre westward to the Vrapče district. The street is 5.6 km (3.5 mi) long, making it the fourth longest street in the city.

The name was first recorded in 1431, while the street itself retained its present shape at the end of the 18th century. In the 14th century, the street was known under the name Lončarska ves (archaic Croatian for "Potters' village", also Vicus lutifigulorum in Latin).

Today, Ilica is 5,653 meters long, making it the fourth longest in Zagreb, after Radnička cesta and Zagrebačka and Slavonska avenues. It stretches from Ban Jelačić Square to Vrapče in the east of the city. However, it still ranks first in house numbers, with over 500 of them. It also boasts the title of the first paved street in Zagreb, because it was laid out during the renovation of the city's roads due to the introduction of the electric tram. The first tram powered by electricity was launched in Zagreb on August 18, 1910.

In 2012, a typeface named after the street was developed for Zagreb's new street signalization and house number plate system. The name was adopted because Ilica was intended to be the first street the plates would be put up on.

== Notable addresses ==
- 1 Ilica, 1 Ilica skyscraper
- 3 Ilica, Croatian Bureau of Statistics (formerly Croatian Discount Bank)
- 4 Ilica, Nama (formerly Kastner & Öhler) department store
- 5 Ilica, Palace of the First Croatian Savings Bank with Oktogon
- 7 Ilica, Metropolitanate of Zagreb and Ljubljana
- 12 Ilica, British Council in Zagreb
- 17 Ilica, The Tošo Dabac Archive
- 36 Ilica, Plavi telefon (Blue Phone), helpline for children and youth
- 48 Ilica, Democratic Centre party headquarters
- 85 Ilica, Zagreb Academy of Fine Arts
- 208 Ilica, EXIT Theater
- 224 Ilica, Zagrebačka pivovara

== See also ==
- Zagreb
- Academy of Fine Arts Zagreb
- Zagrebačka pivovara
