= First Croatian Savings Bank =

Former bank based in Zagreb

Croatian Savings Bank
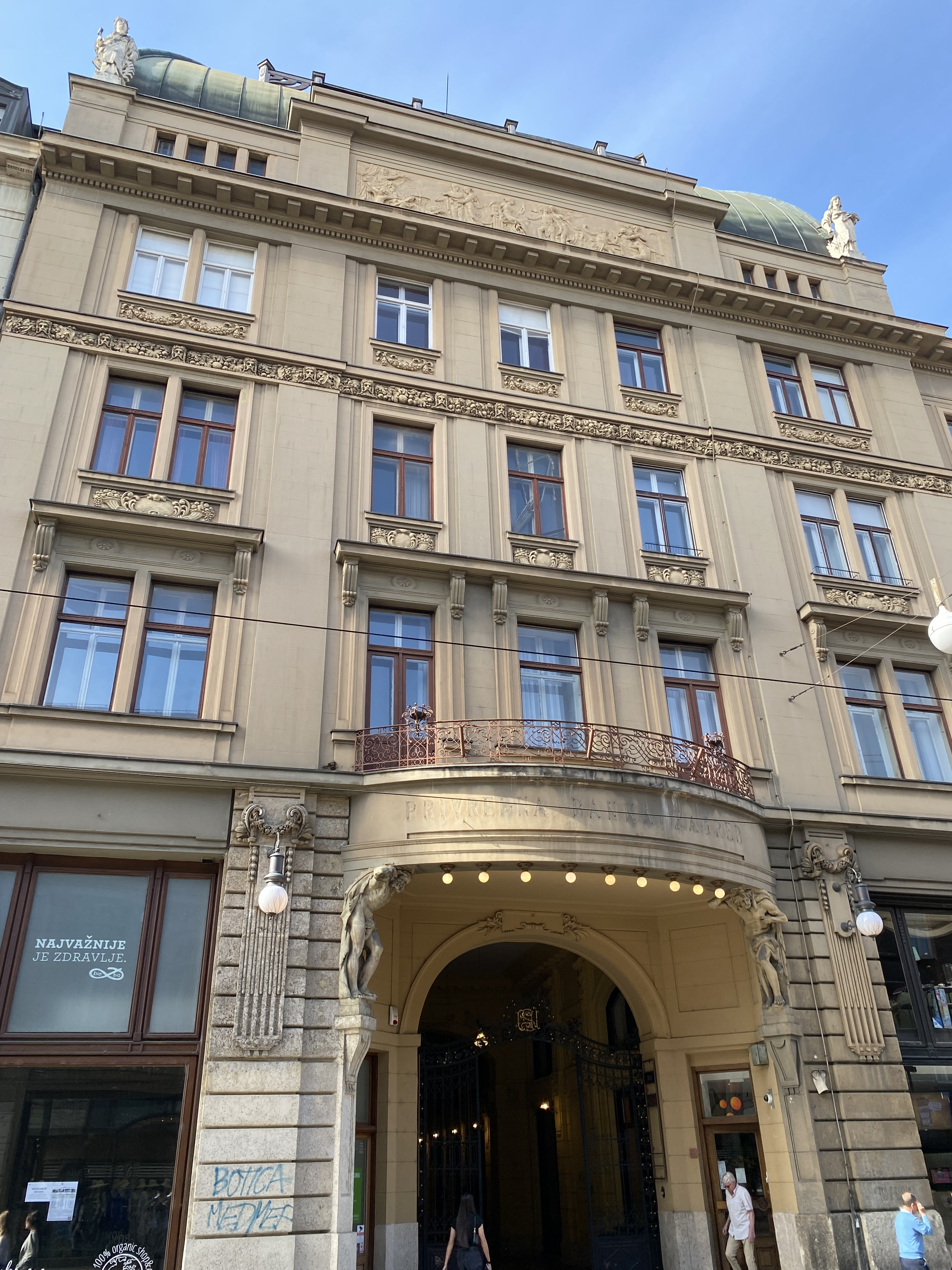
- Entrance to the First Croatian Savings Bank's Head office complex on Ilica Street, Zagreb
- Native name: Prva hrvatska štedionica
- Type: Private company
- Industry: Banking
- Founded: 1846 in Zagreb, Croatia
- Defunct: 1945
- Fate: Taken over by the National Bank of Yugoslavia
- Headquarters: Zagreb, Croatia
- Products: Banking services

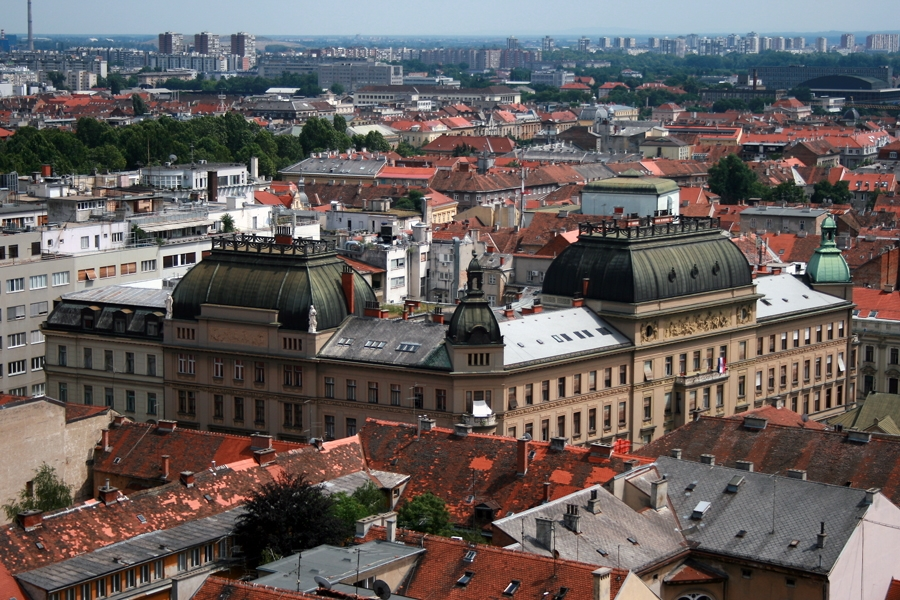
View of First Croatian Savings Bank's Head office complex in Zagreb

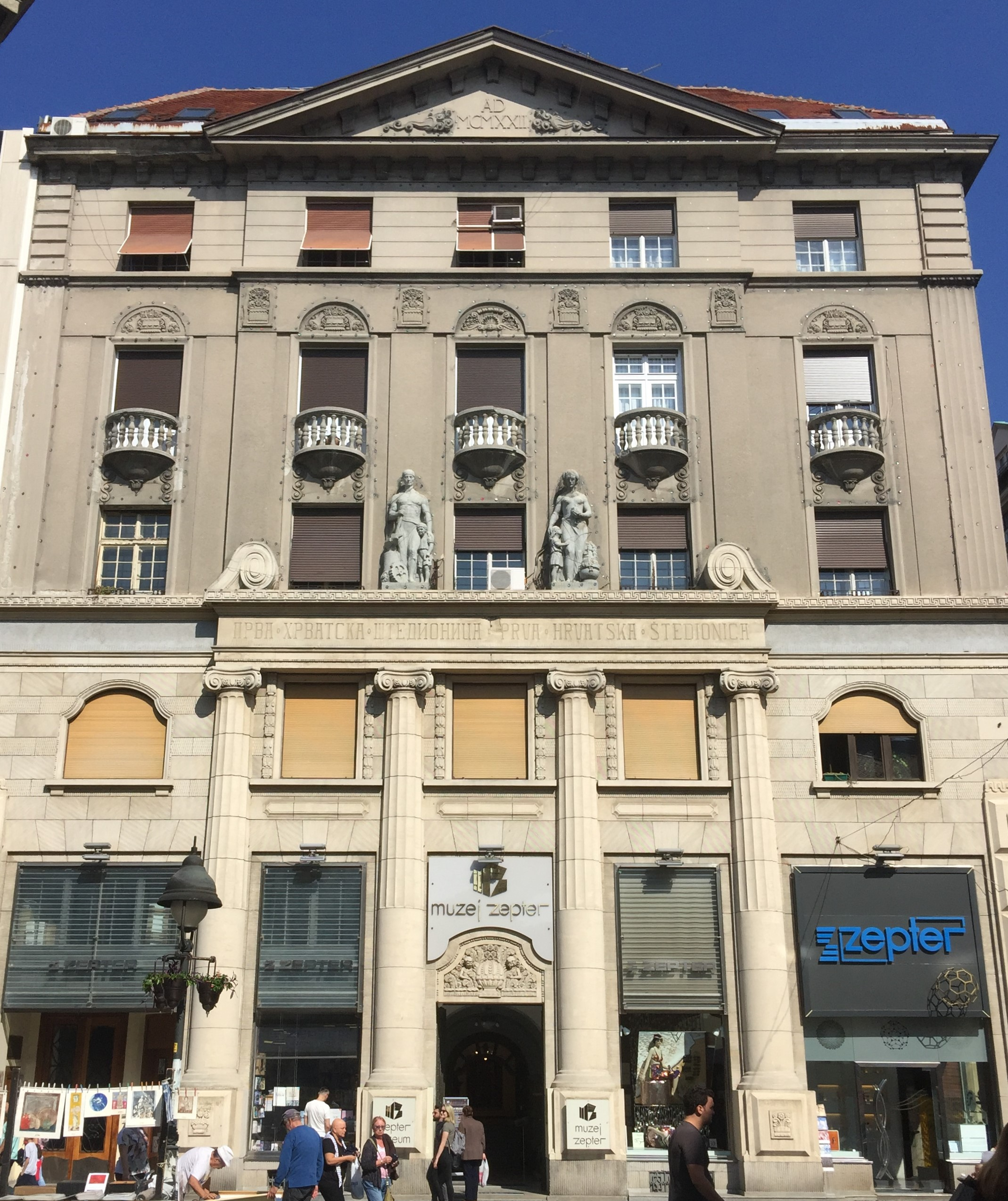
Branch building in Belgrade, later Zepter Museum

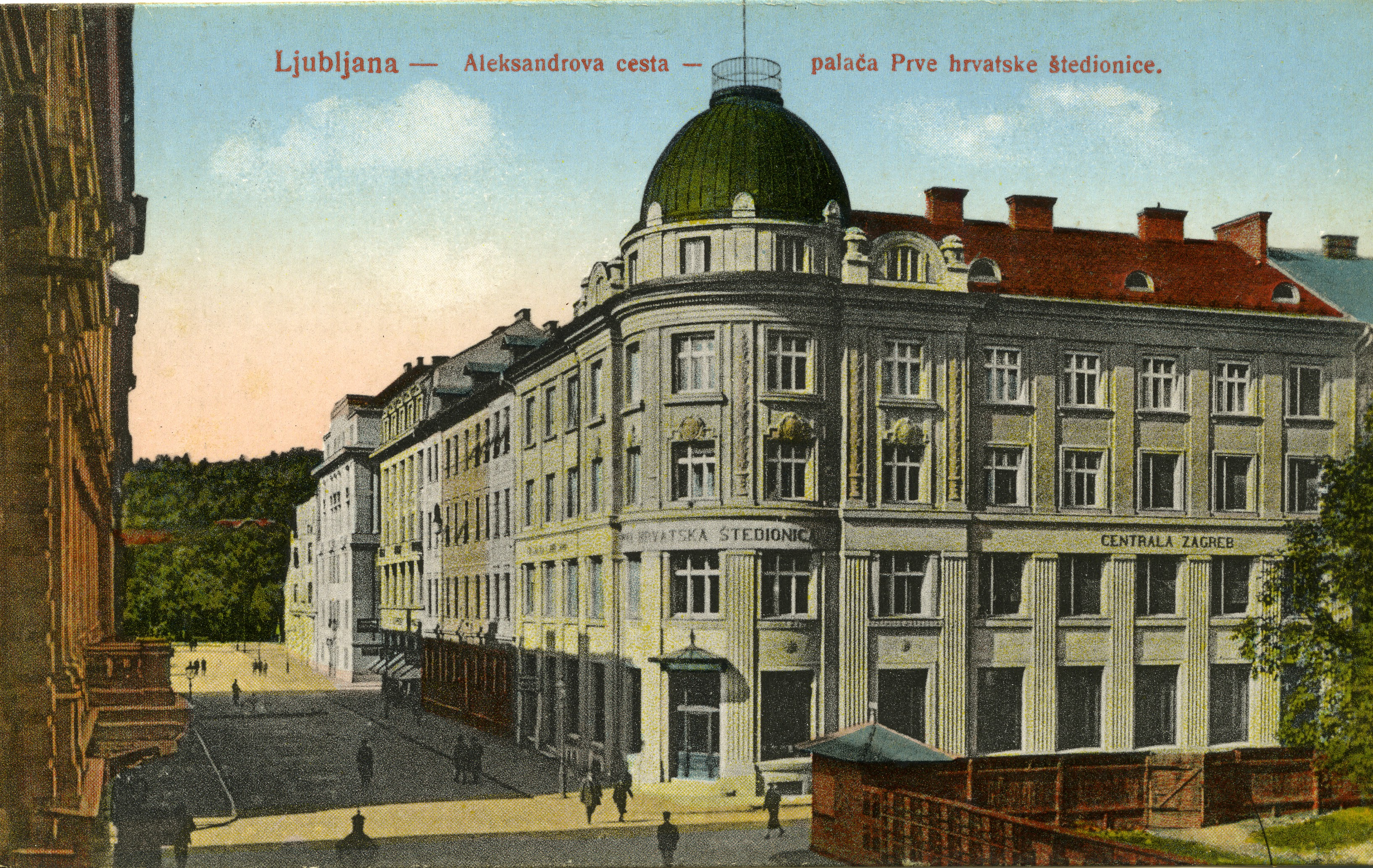
Branch building in Ljubljana (postcard)

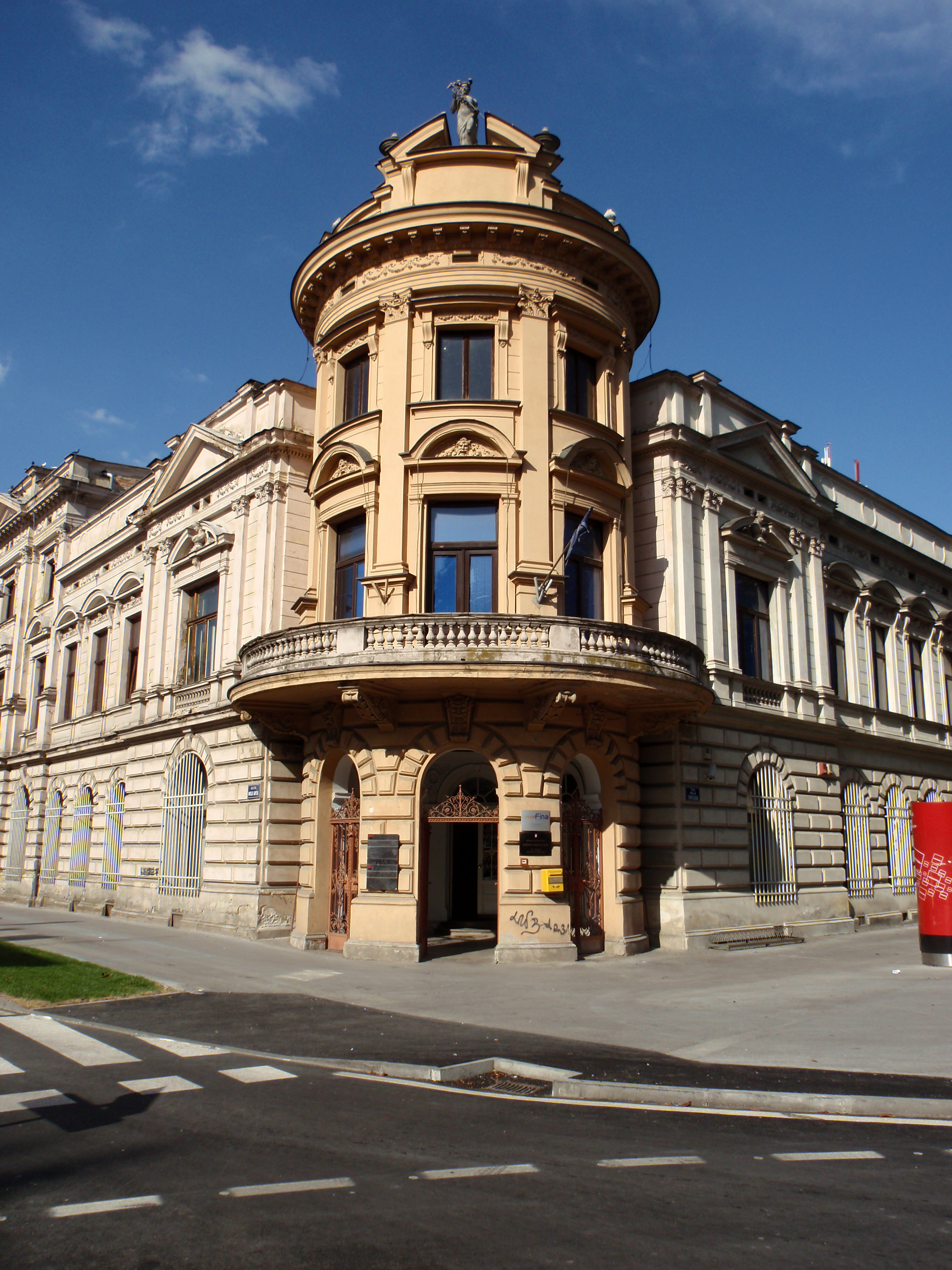
Branch building in Virovitica

The First Croatian Savings Bank (Croatian: Prva hrvatska štedionica, German: Erste kroatische Sparkasse) was a significant Croatian bank headquartered in Zagreb. The bank was founded in 1846 and liquidated in 1945.

It has been described as "the first modern credit institution in Zagreb" and "one of the most significant financial institutions in Croatia's banking history".

== History ==
=== Habsburg era ===
The First Croatian Savings Bank was created on March 4, 1846, in Zagreb, on the basis of Imperial Austrian legislation of 1844 that facilitated the establishment of savings banks. It followed precedents such as the Erste österreichische Spar-Casse in Vienna (1819), the Laibacher Sparkasse in nearby Ljubljana (1820), and the First National Savings Bank of Pest (1839-40). Its founders included Ljudevit Gaj, Dimitrija Demeter, Antun Mažuranić, Ambroz Vranyczany, Franz von Kulmer, and Anastas Popović. The latter became the bank's first president. The shareholders were mostly merchants of Gradec, which five years later merged with its sister town of Kaptol to form the city of Zagreb. Following the Austro-Hungarian Compromise of 1867, more liberal Hungarian legislation allowed the bank to expand its range of activities and to pay dividends to individual shareholders, by which it acquired widespread appeal as a badge of South Slavic pride and self-awareness.

In the late 1890s the bank commissioned a new head office complex bordering Zagreb's central Ilica thoroughfare, designed by architect Josip Vancaš and completed in 1900. It includes the Oktogon gallery that has become an icon of belle époque Zagreb.

=== Yugoslav era ===
After the disruption of World War I, Zagreb emerged as the dominant financial center of the newly formed Kingdom of Yugoslavia, and the First Croatian Savings Bank administered 40 percent of all deposits in the city. By 1924, it had branches in Belgrade, Bjelovar, Slavonski Brod, Celje, Crikvenica, Čakovec, Daruvar, Delnice, Đakovo, Dubrovnik, Đurđevac, Ilok, Karlovac, Kraljevica, Križevci, Ljubljana, Maribor, Sremska Mitrovica, Nova Gradiška, Novi Sad, Ogulin, Osijek, Požega, Senj, Sisak, Skopje, Split, Subotica, Sušak, Sveti Ivan Zelina, Varaždin, Velika Gorica, Vinkovci, Virovitica, Vukovar, Zemun as well as Fiume. In 1928, it took over the United Central Bank of Sarajevo (Serbo-Croatian: Ujedinjena centralna banka), resulting in further branches in Banja Luka, Bihać, Brčko, Derventa, Mostar, Travnik, and Tuzla. In 1930-1931, its chairman Miroslav Kulmer was vice-governor of the National Bank of the Kingdom of Yugoslavia.

During the European banking crisis of 1931, however, the bank faced massive deposit withdrawal in the autumn of that year, and, at its request, was placed under moratorium by decree of 21 April 1932, a measure that was subsequently extended to other financial institutions under stress. It had to sell land holdings and reduce its lending in the following years, with detrimental macroeconomic effects in Croatia.

=== World War II and aftermath ===
The bank's activity continued and expanded again under the wartime Independent State of Croatia, even though it lost all connections with Serbia and its branches outside the new Croatian borders. It ended the moratorium status in November 1941. Unlike most other Zagreb-based banks, which fell under direct German control, it was able to retain its Croatian ownership throughout the war. Like the rest of Yugoslavia's banking sector, the First Croatian Savings Bank was liquidated and its assets taken over by the National Bank of Yugoslavia in November 1945.

=== Legacy ===
Privredna banka Zagreb, created as a state-owned bank in 1966, brands itself as the successor entity of the First Croatian Savings Bank.

== See also ==
- Carniolan Savings Bank
- First National Savings Bank of Pest
- List of banks in Croatia
- List of banks in Yugoslavia
