= Ilica (typeface) =

Typeface family

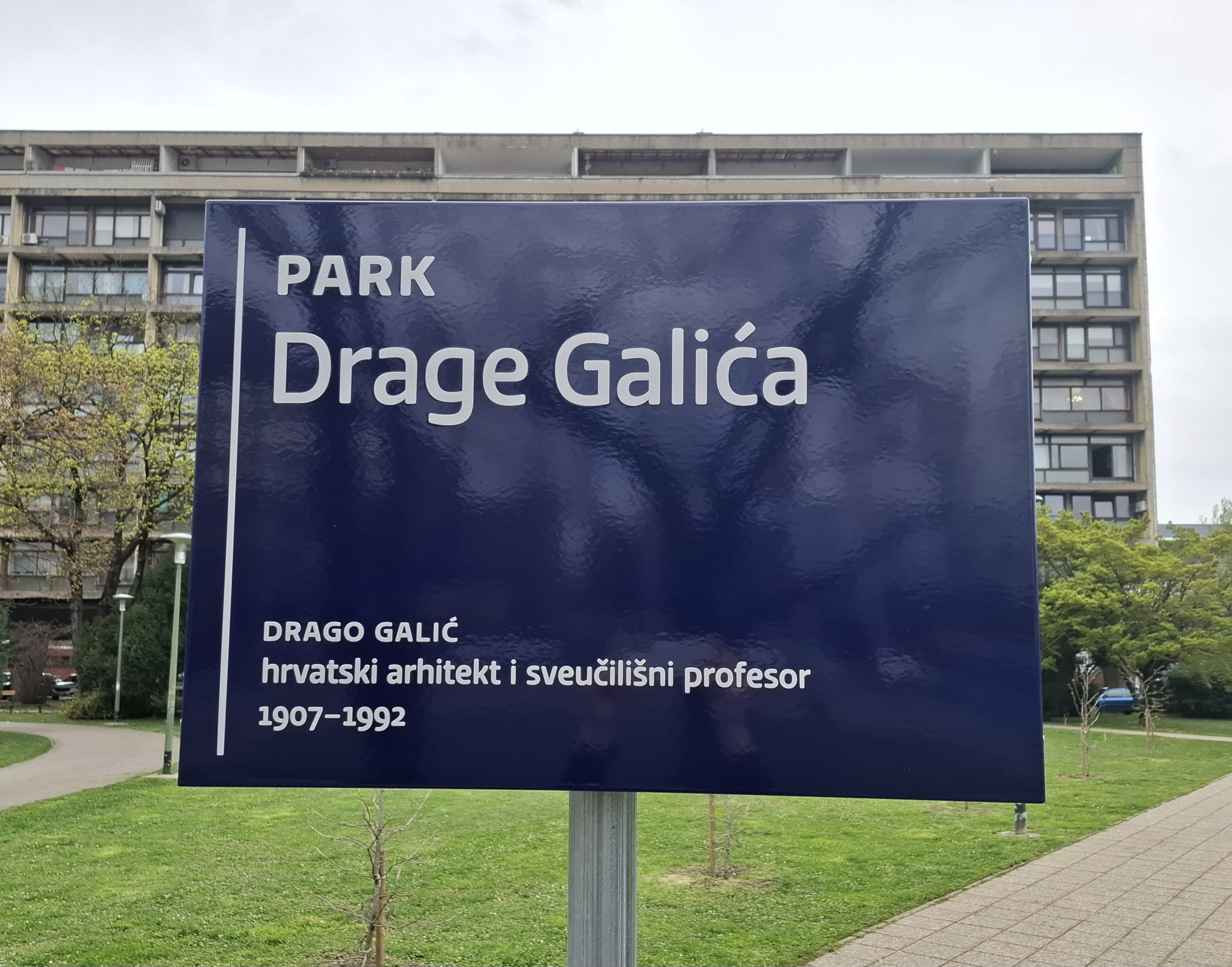
Street sign featuring the Ilica font and design, Drago Galić park, 2025

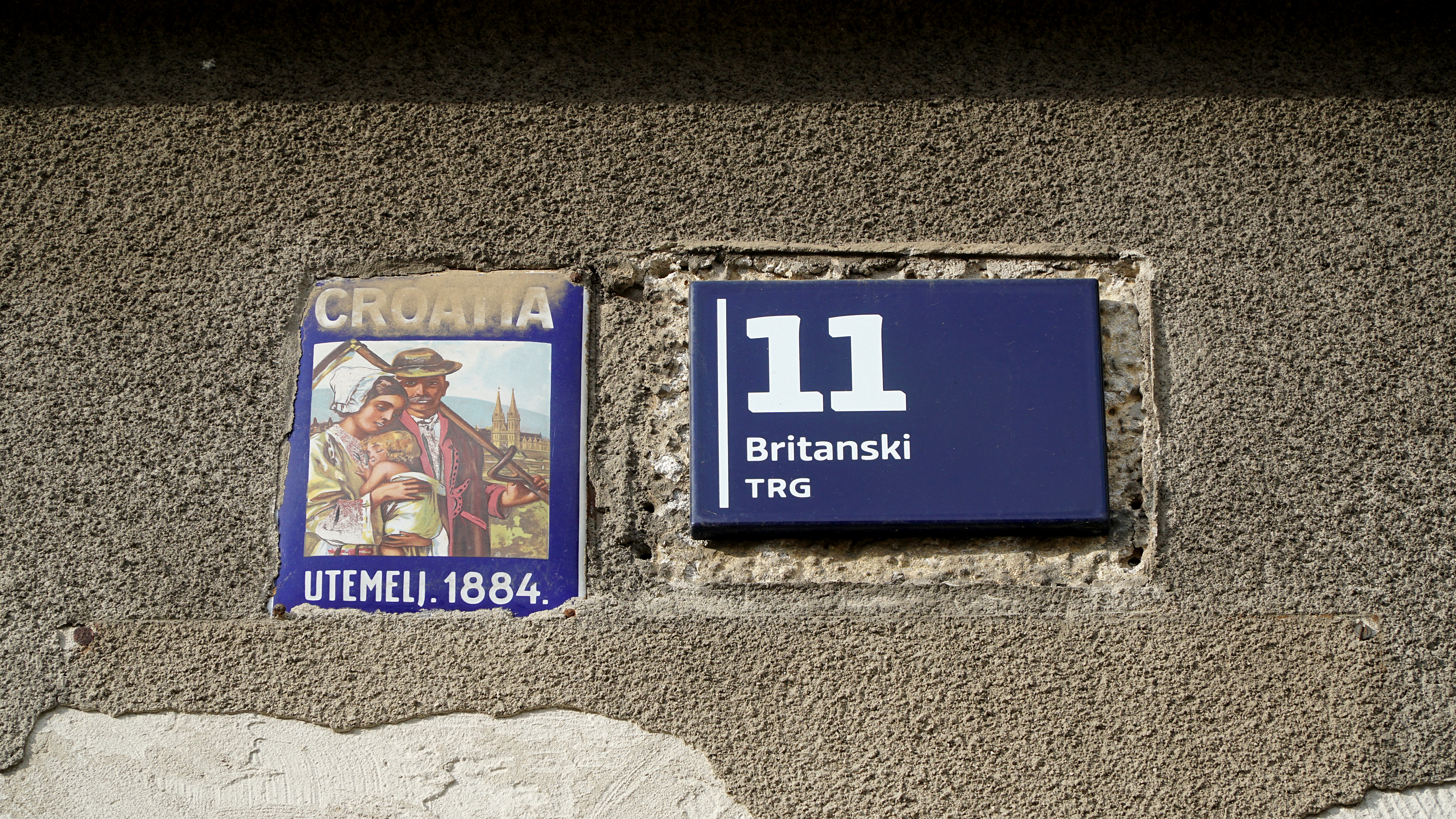
House number plate featuring Ilica on the British square, Zagreb. The other blue plate to the left is an insurance marker.

Ilica (pronounced [ˈilitsa] EEL-itsa) is a typeface created for Zagreb's street signalization by typographers Nikola Đurek and Damir Bralić in 2012. It was named after the synonymous street in Donji grad, where new street signalization featuring the font was supposed to be put up first. The font features 16 variations and was designed as a "contemporary interpretation" of the secessionist inscriptions on the faces of many historical buildings in Zagreb, in combination with features from other old inscriptions in the city that constitute its typographic heritage.

The typeface was designed on specific request from the government of Zagreb to complement new regulations brought in 2013 to unify street signalization and house number plates across the city. It won an award for best professional design of spatial and graphical interventions and sistems from the Croatian Designers' Society in 2014.

== Controversy ==
The face was a topic of controversy for Croatian designers Saša Šimpraga and Robert Štimec. Their complaints and critiques were by and large focused on the implementation of the singalization system itself, but placed emphasis on the plates' designs as well (which were all created by the authors of the face). Šimpraga judged that the typeface was "of lower quality than many of the authoring duo's previous works", while Štimec claimed that, aside from them being too small, the choice of making the numbers boldface and grotesque greatly affected their readability when compared to serif typefaces, a "cardinal mistake" according to Štimec.

== Gallery ==
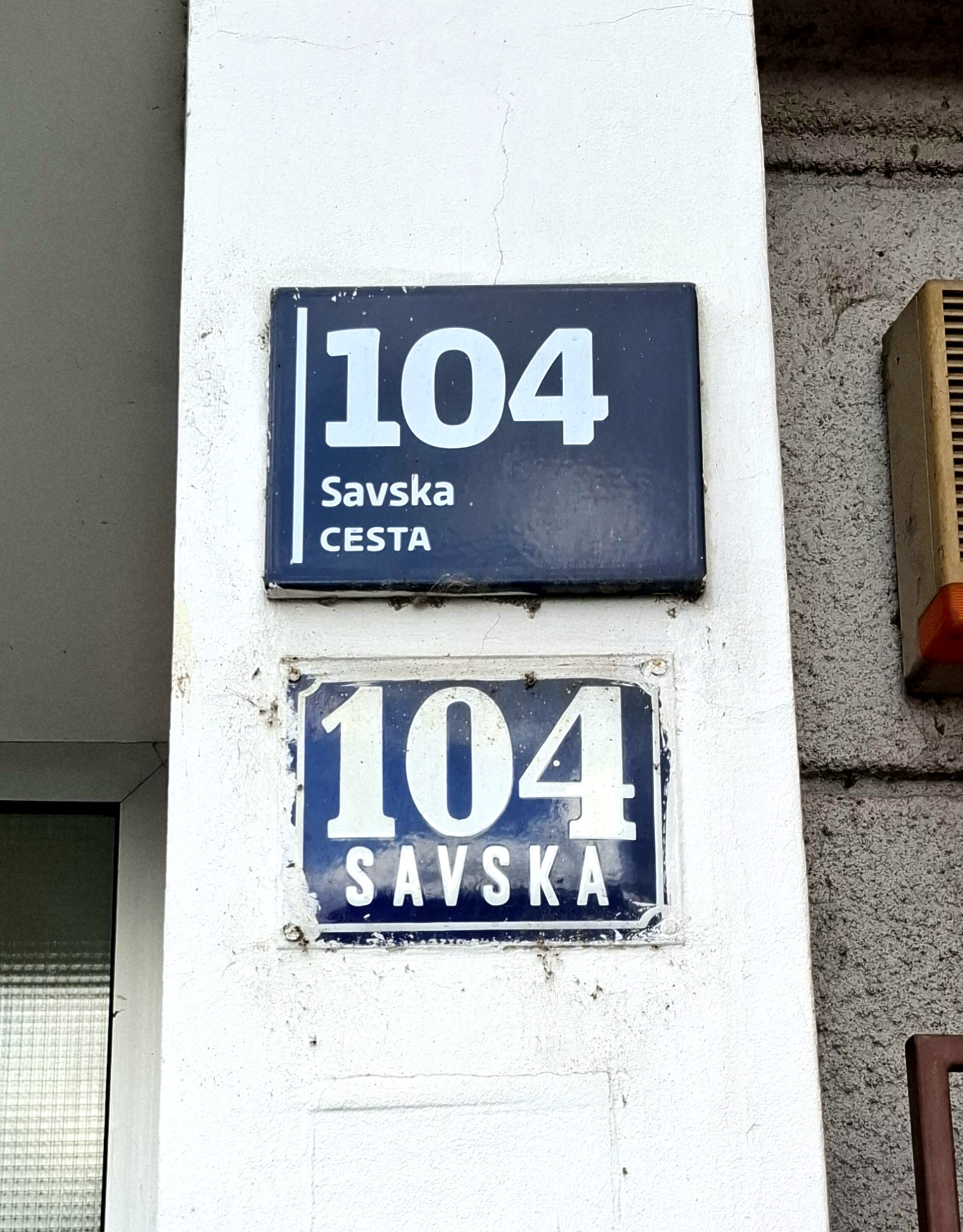
Old SFRY-age and new Ilica house number plates

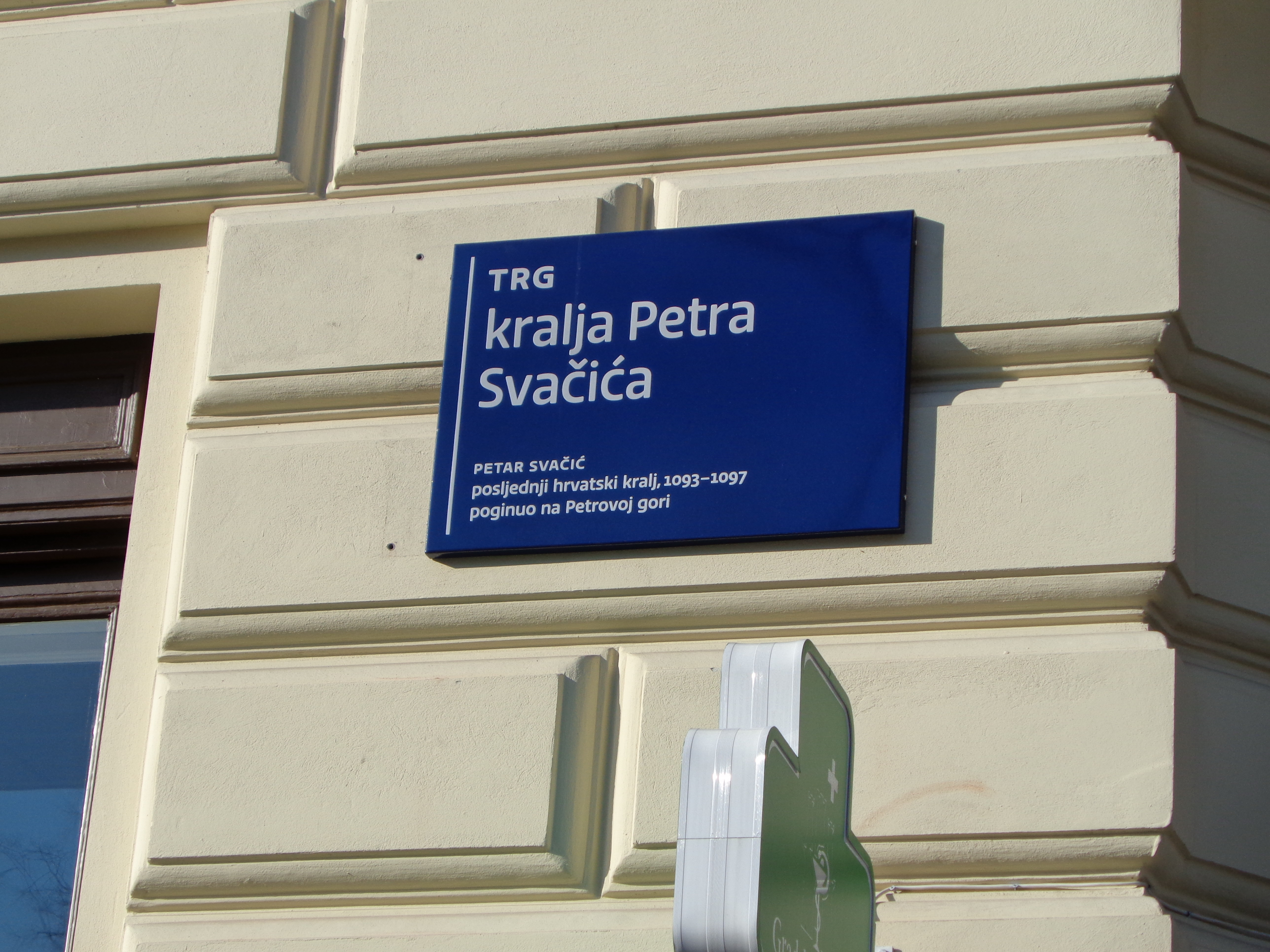
Street sign on King Petar Svačić Square

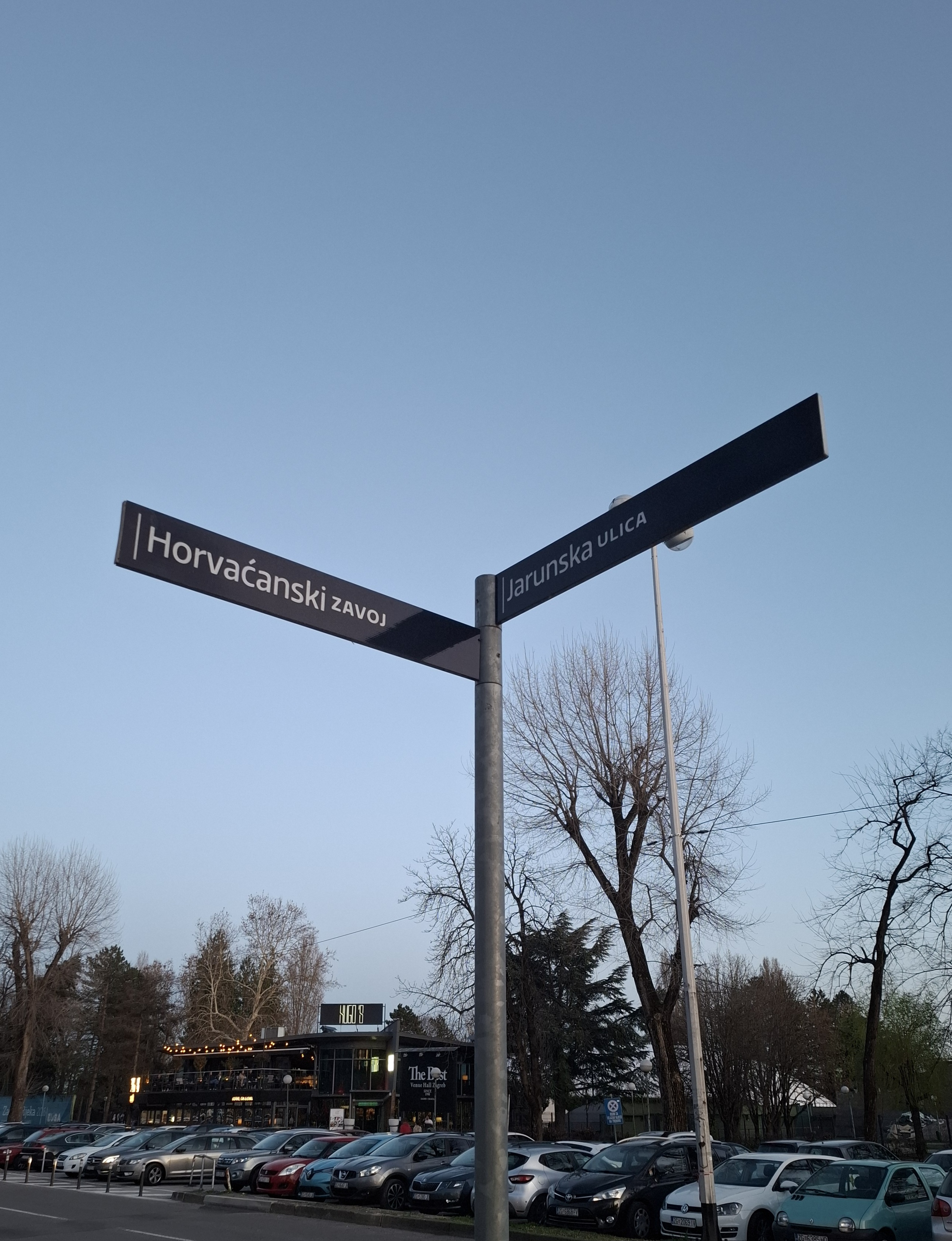
Street signs in Jarun

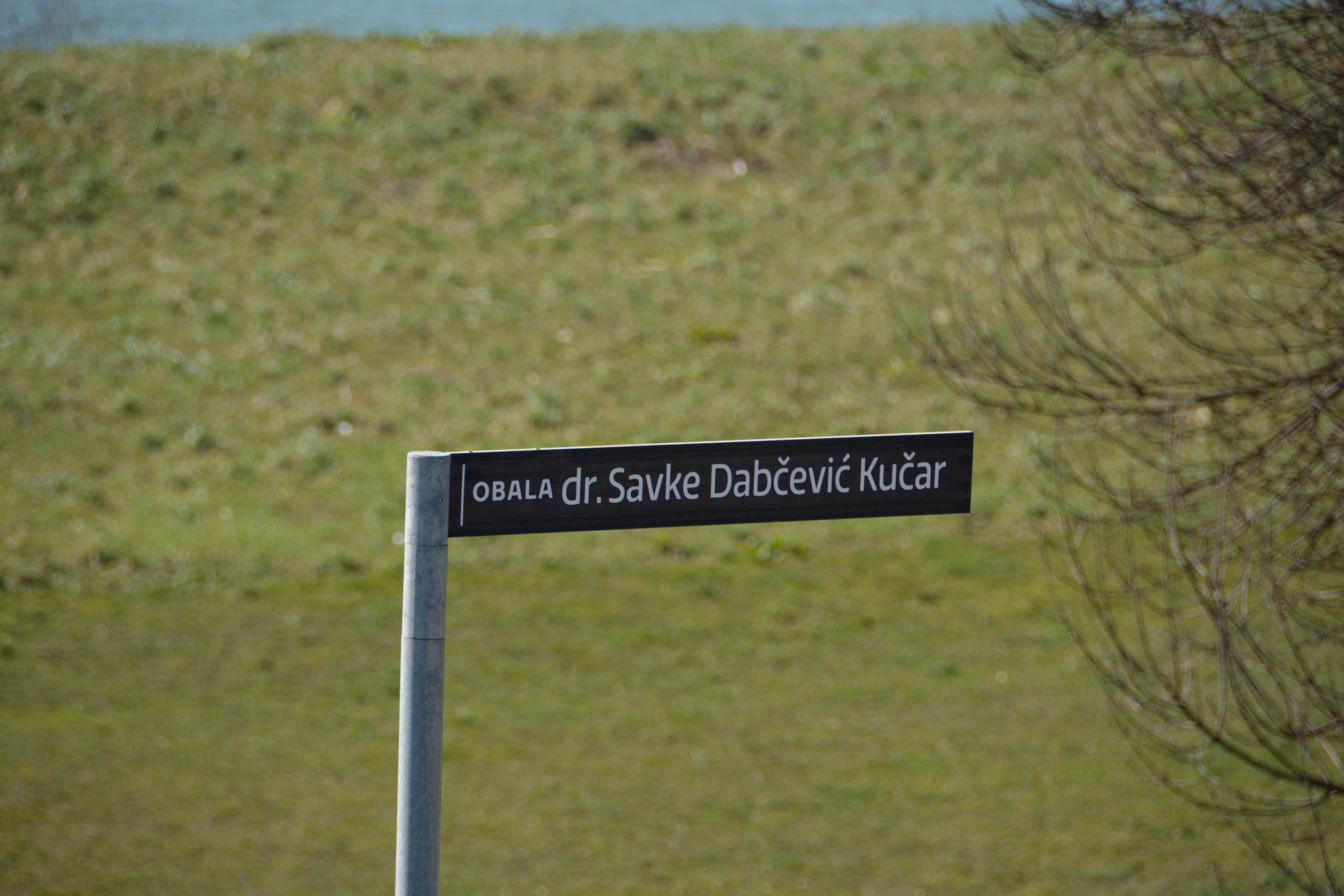
Savka Dabčević-Kučar Coast sign

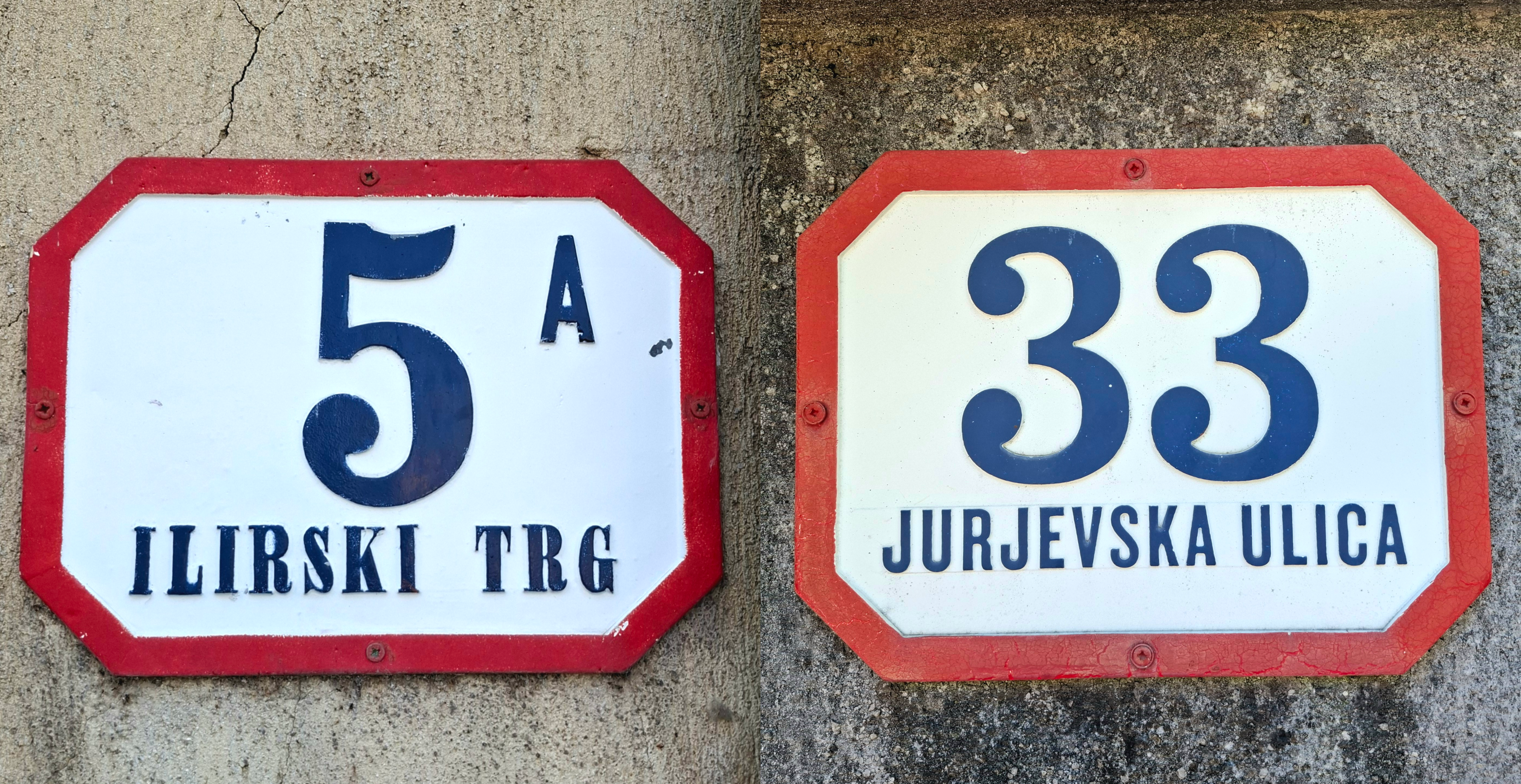
Historic Kaptol house number plate in Onyx typeface (left, repainted) and a modern one in Ilica (right)

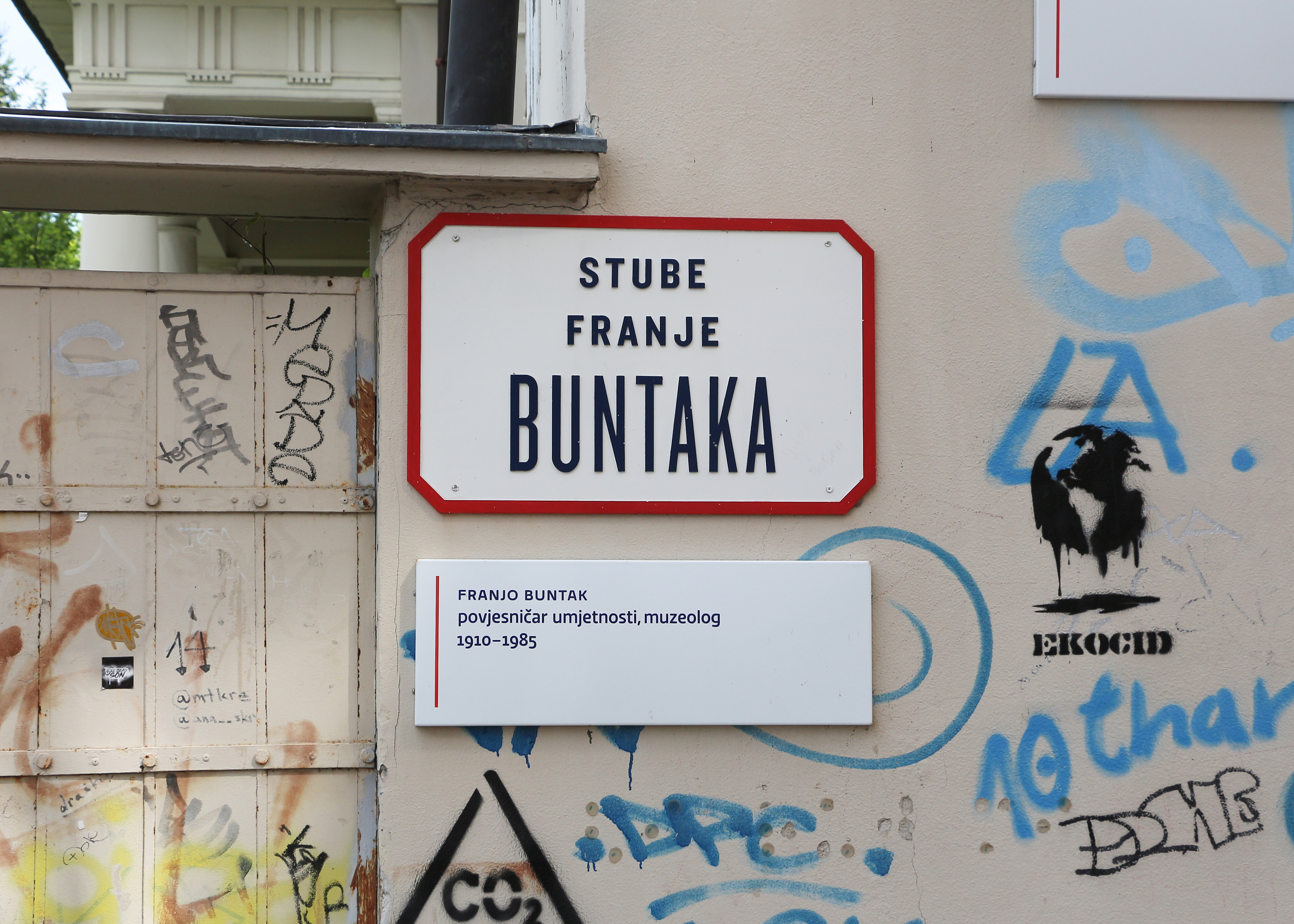
Modern Ilica design for a Kaptol street sign
