= Judith O'Fallon =

American statistician

Judith O'Fallon, née Judith Rich, is a retired American statistician. She was elected as a Fellow of the American Statistical Association in 1984, and is also a lifetime member of it.

== Education ==
In 1973 she received a PhD in statistics from the University of North Carolina at Chapel Hill. Her dissertation was "Discriminant Analysis Under Truncation" and her advisor was N.L. Johnson.

== Work ==
She was president of the Eastern North American Region (ENAR) of the International Biometric Society in 1994.

She worked as a research statistician at the Mayo Clinic until she retired.

Her most cited papers are:

- Daumas‐Duport C, Scheithauer B, O'Fallon J, Kelly P. Grading of astrocytomas: a simple and reproducible method. Cancer. 1988 Nov 15;62(10):2152–2165. (Cited 1125 times, according to Google Scholar.)
- Smith JS, Perry A, Borell TJ, Lee HK, O’Fallon J, Hosek SM, Kimmel D, Yates A, Burger PC, Scheithauer BW, Jenkins RB. Alterations of chromosome arms 1p and 19q as predictors of survival in oligodendrogliomas, astrocytomas, and mixed oligoastrocytomas. Journal of Clinical Oncology. 2000 Feb 1;18(3):636–. (Cited 932 times, according to Google Scholar.)
- Smith JS, Alderete B, Minn Y, Borell TJ, Perry A, Mohapatra G, Hosek SM, Kimmel D, O'Fallon J, Yates A, Feuerstein BG. Localization of common deletion regions on 1p and 19q in human gliomas and their association with histological subtype. Oncogene. 1999 Jul;18(28):4144–4152. Journal of Clinical Oncology. 2000 Feb 1;18(3):636–. (Cited 423 times, according to Google Scholar.)

== Personal life ==
She married William Michael (Mike) O’Fallon on September 2, 1961. They had two sons, Liam and Sean. William died on February 19, 2022.

She became a Rotarian in 1989.
