= Kutjevo Abbey =

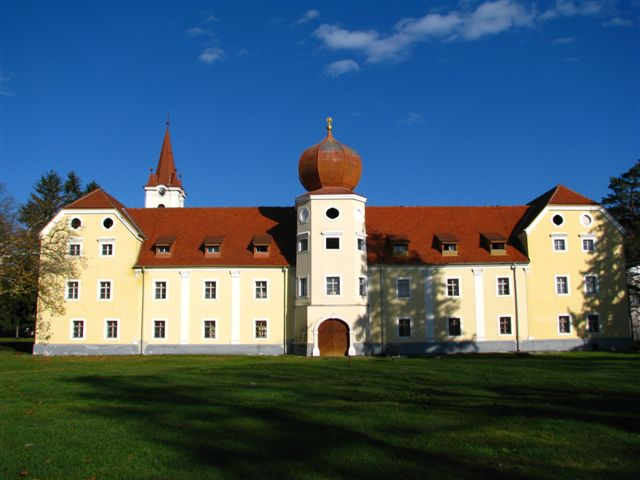

- Location within Croatia
- Interactive map of Kutjevo Abbey

Monastery information
- Order: Cistercian
- Established: 1232; 794 years ago
- Mother house: Zirc Abbey
- Dedication: Blessed Virgin Mary

Site
- Location: Kutjevo, Požega-Slavonia
- Country: Croatia
- Coordinates: 45.45°N 17.8331°E

Kutjevo Abbey, also known as Gotó (Latin: Vallis honesta de Gotho) was a Cistercian monastery in what is now Croatia, in the area of Slavonia, 23 km north-east of Požega.

== History ==
The monastery was founded in 1232 as a daughter-house of Zirc Abbey in Hungary, of the filiation of Clairvaux. The Cistercians planted the vineyards, which are still cultivated today. After the Turkish attack of 1521 (or 1529), the monastery was dissolved and subsequently destroyed.

In 1689, the monastery estate was granted by Emperor Leopold I to Ivan Babić, a canon of Zagreb, who was named titular abbot. In 1698, the site was re-settled by the Jesuits, who remained there until 1773. In 1882, the property was acquired by Vjenceslav Turković and Franjo Türk, who developed a significant wine production on it. After World War II, this was conducted as a Socialist enterprise.

== Buildings and precinct ==
The existing building complex was built by the Jesuits in the 18th century on the ruins of the Cistercian monastery. The former monastery church, dedicated to the Blessed Virgin Mary, still stands.

== See also ==
- List of Jesuit sites
