= Croatian Bureau of Statistics =

National statistical office

Coordinates: 45°48′47″N 15°58′31″E

Croatian Bureau of Statistics Državni zavod za statistiku

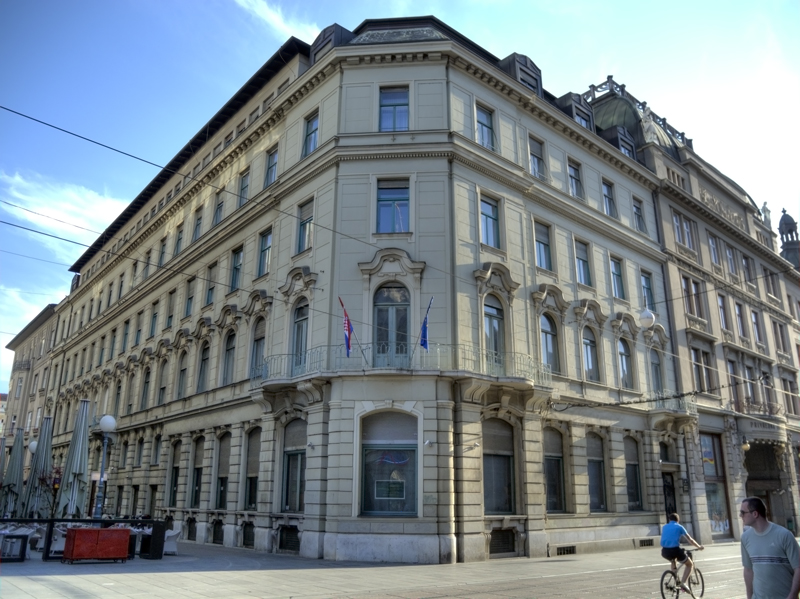
- Croatian Bureau of Statistics building in Zagreb, former head office of Croatian Discount Bank

Bureau overview
- Formed: 18 February 1875; 151 years ago
- Type: National statistical office of Croatia
- Headquarters: Ilica 3, Zagreb, Croatia
- Employees: 482 (2025 plan)
- Budget: €45.6 million (2026 plan)
- Website: dzs.gov.hr

Director General
- Currently: Lidija Brković since 1 April 2019

The Croatian Bureau of Statistics (Croatian: Državni zavod za statistiku or DZS) is the Croatian national statistics bureau.

== History ==
The bureau was formed in 1875 in Austria-Hungary as the Zemaljski statistički ured for the Kingdom of Croatia, Slavonia and Dalmatia.

In 1924, the bureau was renamed to the Statistical Office in Zagreb (Statistički ured u Zagrebu). In 1929, after royal monarchy was proclaimed in the Kingdom of Serbs, Croats and Slovenes the bureau lost its financial and technical independence.

In 1939 with the formation of the Banovina of Croatia, the office was made subject to the presidential office on the Ban's administration. In 1941 the Independent State of Croatia was formed and an Office of General State Statistics existed during this time under the control of the presidential government.

In 1945 the Statistical Office of the People's Republic of Croatia was formed. In 1951 it was renamed to the Bureau of Statistics and Evidence, in 1956 to the Bureau of Statistics of the People's Republic of Croatia and in 1963 to the Republican Bureau for Statistics of the Socialist Republic of Croatia.

The bureau was independent during this time, but was subordinated to the Yugoslavian Federal Bureau for Statistics.

Upon Croatian independence, the Central Bureau of Statistics was made the highest statistical body in the nation.

== Work ==
The bureau collects and processes data for the Republic of Croatia. Among other things, the bureau conducts the Croatian census.

The Bureau keeps records on Croatian censuses since 1857, including the recent:

- 1991 Croatian census
- 2001 Croatian census
- 2011 Croatian census
- 2021 Croatian census

=== List of Director Generals ===
Director General
#	Name	Took office	Left office
1	Jakov Gelo	7 January 1991	2 November 1995
2	Ivan Rusan	6 November 1995	13 September 2001
/	Zlatko Grzelj (acting)	13 September 2001	15 November 2001
3	Marijan Gredelj	15 November 2001	15 July 2004
(1)	Jakov Gelo	15 July 2004	15 June 2005
/	Darko Jukić (acting)	15 June 2005	21 May 2008
4	Ivan Kovač	21 May 2008	30 June 2013
5	Marko Krištof	1 July 2013	31 March 2019
6	Lidija Brković	1 April 2019	Incumbent
