= Ožujsko =

Croatian brand of lager beer

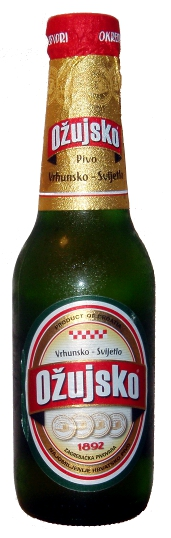
- Type: Lager
- Manufacturer: Zagrebačka pivovara
- Origin: Croatia
- Introduced: early 20th century, Lobe brewery Nova Gradiška
- Alcohol by volume: 5%
- Website: www.ozujsko.com

Ožujsko is a Croatian brand of lager beer (5%). It is the flagship brand produced by Zagrebačka pivovara, the biggest brewery in the country which has been a part of Molson Coors Brewing Company since 2013.

The recipe and brand of Ožujsko beer originated from the Lobe brewery from Nova Gradiška.

== Specification ==
It is made from natural ingredients – barley, yeast, hops and water. Ožujsko has a golden color. It was named after the month of March (Croatian: ožujak), when traditionally the best beer is made. With developments in production this seasonality is no longer important for the quality of Ožujsko pivo and now it can be brewed all year round. It is also described as "a golden lager, with a deep white head. A sweet corn and malt nose gives to a fruity finish"

== History ==
Ožujsko beer is one of the oldest brands with uninterrupted continuity of production in Croatia. Ožujsko beer originates from the Lobe brewery from Nova Gradiška.

The Lobe brewery was founded by Dragutin Lobe (Požega 1833. - Nova Gradiška 1924.) after he moved from Požega to Nova Gradiška in 1851. In the beginning, the brewery employed around 60 workers, and its successful operation led to its modernization and increase in production capacity in 1873. when Lobe brewery became the first steam-powered brewery in Croatia. The brewery was located on the site of today's Ljudevit Gaj Primary School in Nova Gradiška. Further expansion within the Lobe brewery opened additional beer warehouses in Požega, Banja Luka and Zagreb, as well as a store in Masarykova street in Zagreb. The production of Ožujsko beer started in early 20th century in Lobe brewery (the exact year of the start of production in the Lobe brewery is not known; the year 1892 on today's label indicates the year of establishment of the Zagrebačka pivovara and not the start of the production of Ožujsko beer). At the beginning of the 20th century Lobe brewery begins to invest capital in the development of Zagrebačka dionička pivovara i tvornica slada (today Zagrebačka pivovara). Along with the brewery in Nova Gradiška, Lobe also built the "Erherzog Carl" hotel which was built alongside Lobe brewery. Over time, the management of the Lobe brewery was taken over by Dragutin's son Miroslav Lobe (1861. - 1939.), under whose leadership the brewery progressed even more. At its peak, the brewery produced up to 8,000 hectoliters of beer per year. After Miroslav's death, the brewery became a branch of the Zagrebačka dionička pivovara i tvornica slada (today Zagrebačka pivovara). Lobe brewery was shut down in 1943. and it's machines of the production plant were transferred to today's Zagrebačka pivovara. Unfortunately, due to the lack of recognition of the importance of the brewery and its heritage by the local authorities in the mid-20th century, almost every trace of the once magnificent Lobe brewery has been erased.

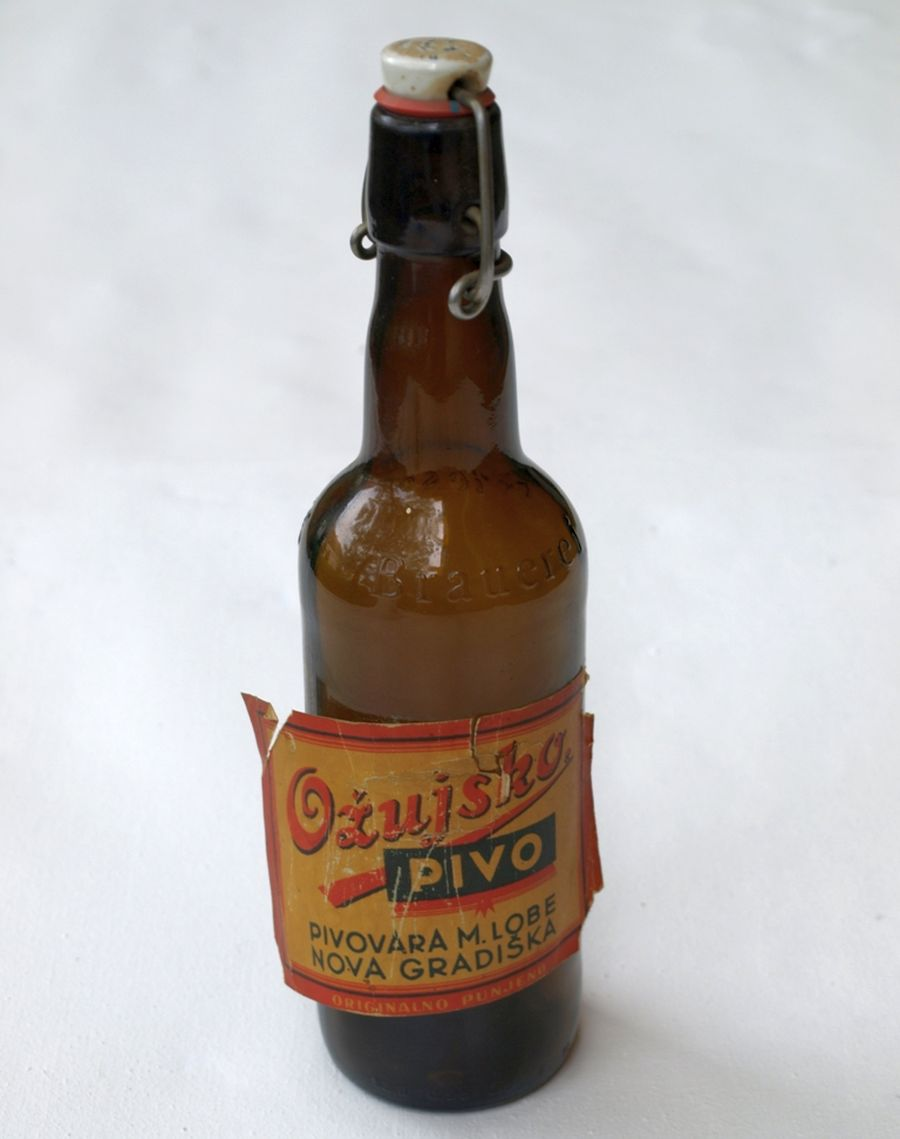
Old bottle of Ožujsko beer, Lobe brewery Nova Gradiška

== Sales and sponsors ==
Ožujsko is the leading beer brand in terms of sales in Croatia, with a market share of approximately 40%. Ožujsko is the official sponsor of the Croatian national football team since 1998.
