= David M. Bennett =

American businessman

David M. Bennett is a San Francisco Bay Area businessman who co-founded Mollie Stone's Markets, a family-owned chain of grocery stores. The company began in 1985 as a natural foods supermarket. After his retirement from the grocery business, Bennett became a community volunteer and musician active in the Bay Area music scene.

== Co-founding Mollie Stone’s Markets ==
Mollie Stone's Markets was co-founded in 1985 by partners David M. Bennett and Mike Stone. Bennett and Stone met while they were both attending California State University, Northridge and decided to go into business together. In the early years, grocer Richard Moresco served as a silent partner. Moresco mentored both Bennett and Stone. The first Mollie Stone's Natural Farm Market was located on Woodside Road in Redwood City. Bennett told Retail Merchandiser that many health food companies would not sell to the store, and that some natural vitamin companies were concerned that being stocked in a supermarket would harm their brands. Stores in Palo Alto and Sausalito followed the Redwood City location. The company expanded in 1996 when the Bay Area supermarket chain Petrini's went out of business. That year, Bennett and his co-founder bought the Petrini stores in Greenbrae, Stonestown Galleria in San Francisco and the Bayhill Shopping Center in San Bruno. Progressive Grocer reported that a Tower Market location in San Francisco was obtained in 2005 In 2011 the company expanded into the Castro region of San Francisco. During the years Bennett co-owned the company, Mollie Stone's Markets had nine stores in the San Francisco Bay Area. The company stopped selling tobacco and offered free childcare inside its San Mateo and San Bruno stores.

== Kosher food ==
Mollie Stone's sells kosher food. In 2011 Bennett said that the company planned to offer kosher dairy products, lunchmeats and beef, and to expand its kosher groceries in response to customer feedback.

== Awards ==
In 2002 Bennett and his co-founder were awarded the Golden Spire Outstanding Business of the Year award from the Marin County Board of Supervisors. In 2008, Bennett received “Wall of Fame” recognition from the San Mateo Library Foundation. The foundation recognized that Mollie Stone's was the first market in the San Francisco Bay Area to discontinue the sale of tobacco products as well as the first to provide free childcare for children ages 2–12 inside the store, known as Mollieland. In 2012, The National Association for the Specialty Food Trade chose Mollie Stone's Markets as their outstanding specialty food retailer of the year. The company was one of five food retailers chosen nationwide. That same year Unified Grocers awarded Mollie Stone's the Ben Schwartz Retail Grocery Visionary award.

== Community involvement ==
Bennett is a Rotarian and volunteers with the San Mateo Rotary. After his retirement, he mentored small business owners in the food and beverage industry. In 2019 he volunteered as a mentor for people involved in early stage start-ups such as plug and play. He has been a guest speaker for classes on entrepreneurship and starting a business in San Francisco at San Francisco State University and Golden Gate University. He also mentors students at the College of San Mateo on starting a small business.

== Musicianship ==
Bennett supports and takes part in the San Francisco Bay Area music scene. He has played with musicians including Eric Maddox from the Timothy Murphy School.

== Personal life ==
Bennett was born in Los Angeles, California. He spent his youth in Reseda, California and is a graduate of Chatsworth High School. Bennett gained sales experience while growing up in his family's construction business. He is married to his high school sweetheart and they have three children and numerous grandchildren.
