= Zagrebačka pivovara =

Brewery in Zagreb, Croatia

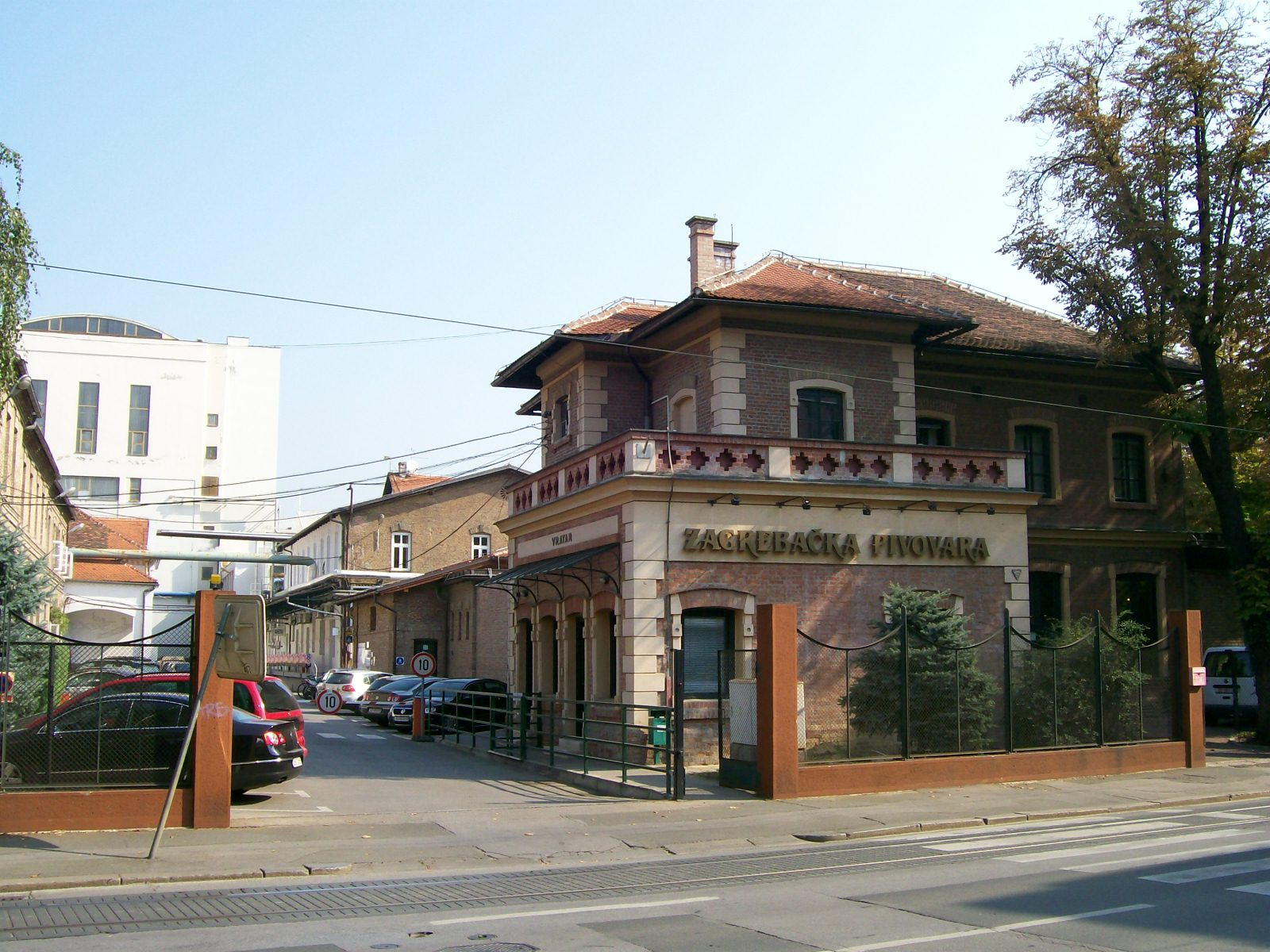
- Main entrance in Ilica Street, Zagreb
- Industry: Alcoholic beverage
- Founded: 1892
- Headquarters: Zagreb, Croatia
- Products: Beer
- Production output: 1.7 million hl
- Owner: CVC Capital Partners
- Number of employees: c. 520 (2017)
- Website: www.ozujsko.com

Zagrebačka pivovara (lit. Zagreb Brewery) was founded in 1892, when brewers from the Upper Town of Zagreb, Croatia realized they were not able to produce enough beer for the ever-growing and developing city. It was the first industrial brewery in Croatia. Today, it is the largest beer manufacturer in Croatia, holding 44% of the market in 2017.

== History ==
The founding assembly of Zagrebačka pivovara as a joint-stock company was held on May 19, 1892, in the premises of the Croatian Eskompt Bank at the Ban Jelačić Square. The main initiators of the construction of a new facility were count Gustav Pongratz and baron Petar Dragan Turković. Shortly after the convention, construction in Gornja Ilica began under supervision of Janko Grahor, based on plans made by architect Kuno Waidmann.

The opening ceremony was held on July 12, 1893. This special event attracted thousands of citizens eager to see the new premises. The brewery was equipped with the Habermann cooling system, a 110 volts dynamo machine, two boilers with volume of 64 cubic litres and was illuminated by electrical lights fifteen years before it was introduced in the rest of the city. With good lighting and a big roof, the brewery quickly became one of Zagreb's most notable sights, and a place where citizens felt comfortable.

Due to its 120-year-old tradition of committing to production of good-quality beer, Zagrebačka pivovara has earned the title of the largest brewery in Croatia. Its commitment to beer has been affirmed by its business achievements and its position as the leading brewery in Croatia.

Since June 2012, Zagrebačka pivovara has been a part of the Molson Coors group within the Molson Coors Europe business unit.

== Products ==
In 1893, Zagrebačka pivovara began producing the today's best-selling beer in Croatia, Ožujsko pivo.

Today, it produces a variety of beer brands:

- Ožujsko pivo
- Ožujsko Rezano
- Ožujsko Cool - non-alcoholic beer
- Ožujsko lemon and Ožujsko grapefruit - refreshing radler (flavoured beermix)
- Tomislav - dark royal beer
- Božićno pivo - special winter beer with an artistic spirit
- Nikšićko pivo
- Beck's - the legendary German premium beer
- Stella Artois - noble premium beer
- Staropramen & Staropramen Selection - exceptional Czech beer
- Carling - leading British beer
- Corona
- Leffe and Hoegaarden - special Belgian beers
- Löwenbräu - German beer
- Branik - Czech beer

In addition, the brewery also produces a brand of non-alcoholic, barley malt-based soft drink called Hidra. The company produces lemon and orange flavoured varieties of the drink.
