= Nika Turković =

Croatian singer-songwriter (born 1995)

- Born: 7 June 1995 (age 31); Zagreb, Croatia
- Occupations: Singer; songwriter; composer
- Years active: 2004–present
- Father: Petar Turković
- Family: Turković of Kutjevo
- Musical career
- Genre: Pop
- Instruments: Vocals; piano
- Labels: Hit Records; Aquarius Records

Nika Turković (born 7 June 1995) is a Croatian singer and songwriter. She initially gained popularity through representing Croatia in the Junior Eurovision Song Contest 2004. Turković was cast in several music TV shows since and has established herself as a pop singer.

== Music career ==
In 2004, Turković was chosen to represent Croatia in the Junior Eurovision Song Contest 2004 held in Lillehammer, Norway. She placed third in the competition. In 2006, she released her debut album, titled Alien. Her live performances include joining Dina Rizvić for some songs in the opening concert of the 2014 Labin Jazz Festival.

== Personal life ==
Turković was born on 7 June 1995 in Zagreb, Croatia. Her mother Gordana is a dentist, and father Petar a psychologist, as well as an official of the Croatian Nanbudo Federation and founder of the first nanbudo club in Zagreb.

She lived with her sister Kiara and her maternal grandmother Biserka. She is fluent in English, Spanish, Italian, and Slovene in addition to her native Croatian. Turković was in a four-year relationship with Croatian singer and fellow cast member of TV show 'A strana' Matija Cvek.

== Discography ==
=== Albums ===
Title	Details	Peak chart positions
Title	Details	CRO Dom.
Alien	Released: 2006; Label: Hit Records; Formats: CD	—
11	Released: 11 January 2023; Label: Aquarius Records; Formats: CD, digital download, streaming	1
Brze suze	Released: 15 May 2025; Label: Aquarius Records; Formats: CD, digital download, streaming	1

=== Singles ===
Title	Year	Peak chart positions	Album
Title	Year	CRO Dom.	Album
"Hej mali"	2004	—	Alien
"U mraku"	2019	18	11
"Raj"	2020	—	11
"Gledaj me"	2020	30	11
"Boje"	2020	—	11
"Pusti"	2021	—	11
"Tvoj mir"	2021	21	11
"Dok nas nema"	2022	30	11
"Sutra"	2022	11	11
"Ima smisla"	2023	8	Brze suze
"Mogu i sama" (with Nela)	2024	7	Non-album single
"Tvoja"	2024	10	Brze suze
"Glupan"	2025	13	Brze suze

Awards and achievements
Preceded by "Ti si moja prva ljubav" Dino Jelusić	Croatia at JESC; 2004	Succeeded by "Rock Baby"; Lorena Jelusić
