= Vjenceslav Turković =

Croatian businessman and politician (1826–1902)

- Born: 28 September 1826; Kraljevica, Kingdom of Croatia, Austrian Empire
- Died: 30 April 1902 (aged 75); Karlovac, Kingdom of Croatia-Slavonia, Austria-Hungary
- Other names: Vencel; Vinko
- Occupations: merchant; business executive; ship-owner; landlord; politician
- Children: 5; including Petar Dragan and Milan
- Family: Turković of Kutjevo

Vjenceslav Turković (28 September 1826 – 30 April 1902) was a Croatian businessman, merchant, and politician. His sons were barons Petar Dragan and Milan Turković.

== Biography ==
Turković moved from Kraljevica to Karlovac, where he established himself in the trade of oak logs and grains and owned his ships. In 1858, together with Franjo Türk, he founded the Turković-Türk Company, the leading company in that branch of trade in Croatia, and operated until 1886. He influenced Karlovac's political and social life, and his house was visited by many Croatian politicians, writers and artists, including bishop Josip Juraj Strossmayer and Franjo Rački. He also improved the inherited Kraljevica Shipyard, where he started the construction of large sailing ships in 1868.

Turković became a representative of Karlovac in the Croatian Parliament in 1865. He was a member of the Parliament until 1871.

=== Kutjevo Landlordship ===
In 1882, at an auction called by the Triune Kingdom Government, Turković bought the estate in Kutjevo, including the Kutjevo Abbey. Three bids were received at the auction; the highest bid came from the Turković-Türk Company in the amount of 1,350,000 fl. Buyers Turković and Franjo Türk signed the sales contract on 10 July 1882. The company's total area is 14,549 hectares, of which 11,967 hectares were under forest, which was the main reason for purchasing the property because the Turković-Türk Company was engaged in the wood trade. The remaining part of the land was used for commercial purposes.

During sixty-three years, his Turković and his sons and grandsons built the Kutjevo Landlordship and brought it to its greatest prosperity. Kutjevo is becoming famous for winegrowing and winemaking around the continent. They expanded their vineyards and orchards, and the Draganlug plantation was regarded as the largest in Europe at the time. They also brought in skilled labor and improved vine cultivation and cellaring, which led to significant changes in the habits and practices of the local population.

== Family ==
Turković married Johanna Amšel. They had five children, daughters Ljuboslava (born 1852) and Jelka (born 1859) and sons Petar Dragan (born 1855), Milan (born 1857), and Ivan. In 1911, his two sons, Petar Dragan and Milan, were made barons by the Austrian Emperor Franz Joseph I.
