= Milan Turković (musician) =

Austrian bassoonist and conductor (born 1939)

- Born: 14 September 1939 (age 87); Zagreb, Yugoslavia (now Croatia)
- Education: Akademisches Gymnasium, Vienna
- Occupations: bassoonist; conductor
- Years active: 1967–present
- Spouse: Ingrid Wendl (m. 1993)
- Family: Turković of Kutjevo

Milan Turković (born 14 September 1939) is an Austrian classical bassoonist and conductor. He originates from an Austro-Croatian family, grew up in Vienna and became internationally known as one of the few bassoon soloists. Over the past two decades, he has become a successful conductor, making appearances all over the world.

== Career ==
Turković began his career as an orchestral musician, holding the post of principal bassoon in the Vienna Symphony. Turković was a member of Concentus Musicus Wien (1967–2012), the Chamber Music Society of Lincoln Center (1992–2012), and was a founding member of Ensemble Wien-Berlin (1983–2009).

Turković is best known as a bassoon soloist. He has a substantial discography and has performed renowned orchestras across the world. He has made numerous premiere performances, including works by Jean Françaix, Sofia Gubaidulina, Iván Erőd, Rainer Bischof, Thomas Daniel Schlee, Friedrich Cerha, Wynton Marsalis and Brett Dean. After a tour with trumpeter Wynton Marsalis in 1998, Marsalis dedicated the quintet Meeelaan for bassoon and string quartet to Turković, which was subsequently performed by Turković all over the world.

Since the beginning of the 21st century, Turković has increasingly focused his career on conducting, having conducted orchestras across Europe as well as Japan, Taiwan and the US. He regularly acts as a principal conductor at the Kusatsu International Summer Music Academy and Festival.

Turković is a recipient of the Edison Award and he also received the German Echo Klassik Award in 2010.

== Recordings ==
Turković's discography currently consists of 9 CDs as a conductor, 20 CDs with solo repertoire, 24 CDs with chamber music and over 200 CDs with Concentus Musicus Wien. He has recorded Mozart's bassoon concerto four times; his third recording was played on a period instrument, with Nikolaus Harnoncourt conducting. Other releases include the concerti by Weber (with Sir Neville Marriner), the quintet for bassoon and strings Meeelaan by Wynton Marsalis and a double CD “Bassoon Extravaganza”. On his most recent CDs he conducted three symphonies by Haydn and two CDs with the German ensemble Selmer Saxharmonic (Echo Klassik Award, 2010).
