= List of Croatian counties by Human Development Index =

Comparison of Human Development Index of Croatian counties

Croatian Counties by HDI in 2022 (2024 Report): > 0.899 / 0.850 - 0.899 / 0.800 - 0.849

Map of the Croatian counties by HDI in 2018.: > 0.799 / 0.799 - 0.700

This article lists the Human Development Index rating of the twenty counties of Croatia, including the city-county of Zagreb.

== Ranking ==
Rank	County	HDI (2023)
Very high human development
1	Zagreb	0.954
2	Primorje-Gorski Kotar	0.925
3	Istria	0.917
4	Dubrovnik-Neretva	0.911
5	Split-Dalmatia	0.891
–	Croatia (average)	0.889
6	Zadar	0.881
7	Zagreb County	0.871
7	Šibenik-Knin	0.871
9	Varaždin	0.867
10	Međimurje	0.866
11	Osijek-Baranja	0.862
12	Karlovac	0.857
13	Lika-Senj	0.856
14	Koprivnica-Križevci	0.847
15	Sisak-Moslavina	0.846
16	Brod-Posavina	0.836
17	Bjelovar-Bilogora	0.835
17	Vukovar-Syrmia	0.835
19	Krapina-Zagorje	0.834
20	Požega-Slavonia	0.830
21	Virovitica-Podravina	0.816

== Historic data ==
Counties of Croatia by HDI (2000–2009)
County	2000	2001	2002	2003	2004	2005	2006	2007	2008	2009
Bjelovar-Bilogora	0.721	0.732	0.740	0.743	0.747	0.751	0.760	0.765	0.773	0.775
Brod-Posavina	0.715	0.729	0.735	0.740	0.745	0.747	0.753	0.762	0.767	0.766
Croatia	0.757	0.768	0.774	0.780	0.786	0.792	0.798	0.808	0.813	0.812
Dubrovnik-Neretva	0.758	0.771	0.775	0.783	0.792	0.799	0.806	0.819	0.820	0.820
Istria	0.774	0.788	0.795	0.802	0.807	0.812	0.817	0.826	0.828	0.829
Karlovac	0.732	0.749	0.755	0.756	0.758	0.765	0.773	0.783	0.786	0.784
Koprivnica-Križevci	0.743	0.753	0.758	0.762	0.763	0.767	0.776	0.784	0.783	0.788
Krapina-Zagorje	0.726	0.740	0.743	0.748	0.750	0.759	0.762	0.773	0.773	0.771
Lika-Senj	0.727	0.735	0.747	0.760	0.776	0.767	0.771	0.775	0.783	0.782
Međimurje	0.734	0.746	0.754	0.758	0.761	0.767	0.775	0.783	0.789	0.789
Osijek-Baranja	0.735	0.747	0.755	0.758	0.764	0.772	0.778	0.791	0.794	0.794
Požega-Slavonia	0.719	0.731	0.735	0.743	0.747	0.752	0.755	0.763	0.766	0.765
Primorje-Gorski Kotar	0.782	0.790	0.795	0.803	0.807	0.816	0.822	0.830	0.836	0.836
Sisak-Moslavina	0.737	0.742	0.746	0.750	0.753	0.760	0.769	0.772	0.779	0.782
Split-Dalmatia	0.750	0.763	0.768	0.775	0.783	0.787	0.794	0.806	0.808	0.807
Šibenik-Knin	0.728	0.738	0.745	0.755	0.761	0.770	0.772	0.786	0.786	0.782
Varaždin	0.746	0.758	0.766	0.771	0.771	0.777	0.782	0.791	0.797	0.797
Virovitica-Podravina	0.715	0.728	0.73	0.738	0.741	0.744	0.753	0.762	0.763	0.761
Vukovar-Syrmia	0.711	0.725	0.731	0.737	0.741	0.748	0.757	0.763	0.769	0.768
Zadar	0.735	0.750	0.757	0.768	0.772	0.779	0.782	0.794	0.799	0.797
Zagreb County	0.741	0.748	0.759	0.764	0.769	0.777	0.780	0.791	0.794	0.796
City of Zagreb	0.807	0.820	0.826	0.833	0.839	0.847	0.854	0.863	0.867	0.868

== See also ==
- List of Croatian counties by GDP
- Economy of Croatia
