= Taxation in Croatia =

Taxes in Croatia are levied by both the central and the regional governments. Tax revenue in Croatia stood at 37.8% of GDP in 2017. The most important revenue sources are income taxes, social security contributions, corporate tax and the value added tax, which are all applied on the national level. Within broader fiscal policy, tax revenue was at 21.3% of GDP, in 2023.

== Income tax ==
Income tax is determined by the amount of income and place of residence. The tax is levied at a lower or higher rate defined by the government and determined by the local government unit. The threshold between the lower and higher rates is set at an annual income of €50,400 equating to a monthly income of €4,200.

Residence	Lower rate	Higher rate
Municipality	15% - 20%	25% - 30%
City with less than 30,000 residents	15% - 21%	25% - 31%
City with more than 30,000 residents	15% - 22%	25% - 32%
City of Zagreb	15% - 23%	25% - 33%

== Value add tax ==
Value add tax (VAT) is levied at three different rates. The standard rate is 25%, two reduced rates are 13% and 5% apply on different goods and services. The 13% rate apply for newspapers, magazines, bread and milk; books and scientific journals, hotels and medicines.

== Employment income tax ==
Employment income is subject to social security, at a rate of 16.5% for the employer and 20% for the employee.

Insurance policy	Employee %	Employer %
Pension Fund	15%	-
Capital savings	5%	-
Health	-	16.5%
Total	20.0%	16.5%

== Corporate taxation ==
Corporate tax depends on the revenue the company earns.

Revenue	Rate
Less than €1 million	10%
More than €1 million	18%

Certain expenses are tax deductible for businesses including personal means of transportation. Resident businesses are taxed on worldwide income, while foreign companies in Croatia are taxed on profits earned in Croatia.

== See also ==
- Economy of Croatia
- Government of Croatia
