= Economy of Croatia =

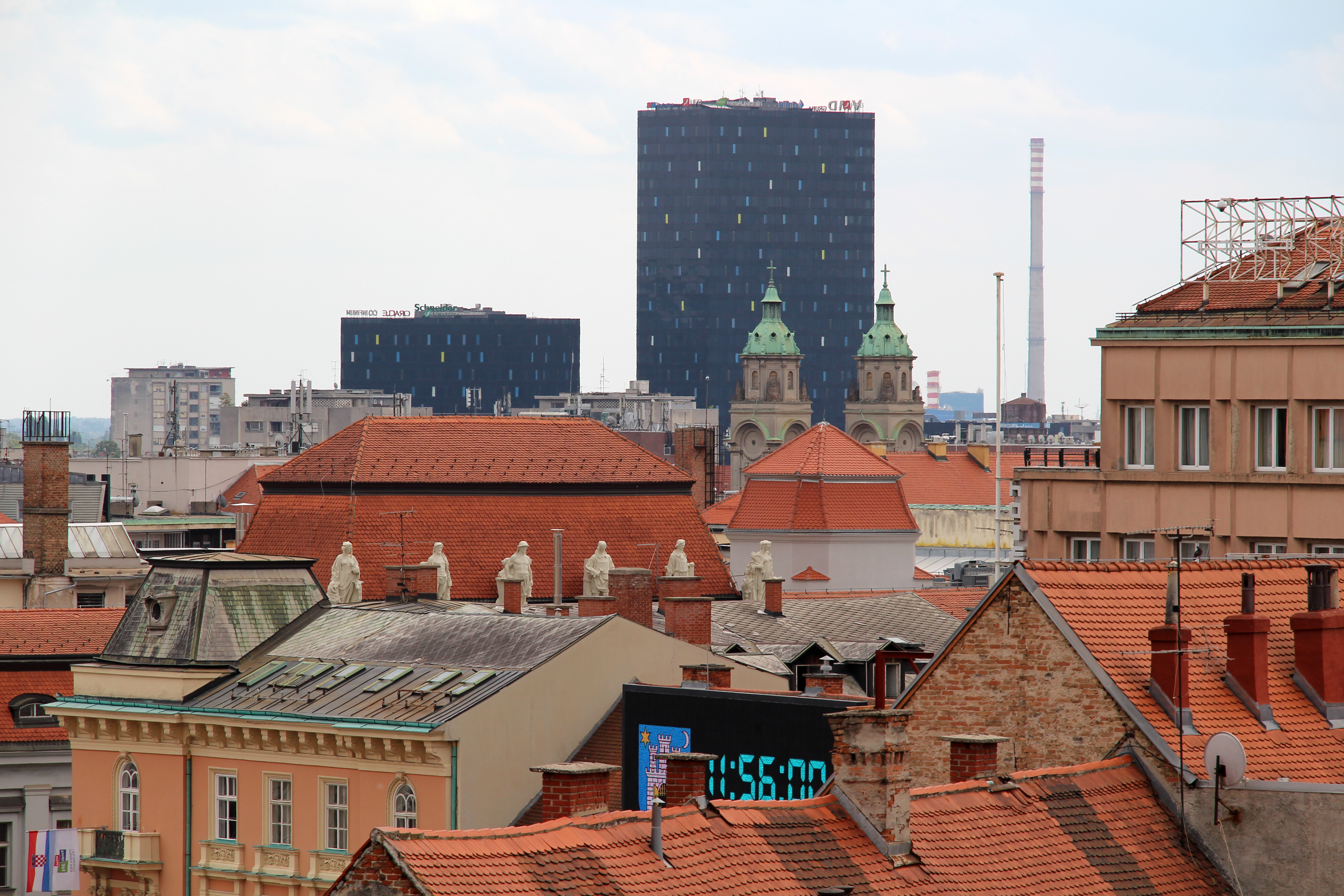
- The city of Zagreb is the capital and financial centre of Croatia.
- Currency: Euro (EUR, €)
- Fiscal year: Calendar year
- Trade organisations: EU, EEA, WTO
- Country group: Advanced economy; High-income economy

Statistics
- Population: ▲3,874,993 (2025)
- GDP: ▲$115.92 billion (nominal, 2026f); ▲$207.40 billion (PPP, 2026f)
- GDP rank: 71st (nominal, 2026); 81st (PPP, 2026)
- GDP growth: ▲2.2% (2026f); ▲2.7% (2027f); 2.7% (2028f)
- GDP per capita: ▲$30,030 (nominal, 2026f); ▲$54,359 (PPP, 2026f)
- GDP per capita rank: 46th (nominal, 2026); 40th (PPP, 2026)
- GDP per capita growth: ▼3.1% (2025)
- GDP by sector: Agriculture: 3.36%; Industry: 21.01%; Services: 59.07%; (2023)
- Inflation (CPI): ▼3.9% (2026)
- Population below national poverty line: ▲21.7% at-risk (2024)
- Gini coefficient: ▲29.8 low (2024)
- Human Development Index: ▲0.889 very high (41st) (2023); ▲0.828 very high IHDI (30th) (2023)
- Corruption Perceptions Index: 47 out of 100 points (2025) (63rd)
- Labour force: ▲1,788,994 (2025); ▲74.4% employment rate (2025)
- Unemployment: ▼3.4% (July 2026); ▼16.3% (youth) (March 2026)
- Average gross salary: €2,184 monthly (June 2026)
- Average net salary: €1,555 monthly (June 2026)
- Main industries: chemicals and plastics, machine tools, fabricated metal, electronics, pig iron and rolled steel products, aluminium, paper, wood products, construction materials, textiles, shipbuilding, petroleum and petroleum refining, food and beverages, tourism

External
- Exports: ▲$28.31 billion (2025)
- Export goods: transport equipment, machinery, textiles, chemicals, foodstuffs, fuels
- Main export partners: Germany 12.67%; Slovenia 11.84%; Italy 11.58%; Bosnia and Herzegovina 10.78%; Serbia 5.53%; Austria 5.00%; Hungary 4.63%; United States 2.58%; Slovakia 2.54%; France 2.51%; (2025)
- Imports: ▲$50.68 billion (2025)
- Import goods: machinery, transport and electrical equipment; chemicals, fuels and lubricants; foodstuffs
- Main import partners: Germany 14.68%; Italy 12.22%; Slovenia 11.96%; Hungary 7.07%; Austria 5.36%; Poland 4.40%; Netherlands 4.12%; China 3.48%; France 3.18%; Bosnia and Herzegovina 2.75%; (2025)
- FDI stock: ▲$43.71 billion (on-shore) (2017); ▲$8.473 billion (off-shore) (2017)
- Current account: ▼€-1.059 billion (2024)
- Gross external debt: ▲€56.19 billion (2024)

Public finance
- Government debt: ▼56.3% of GDP (2025); ▲€52.4 billion (2025)
- Foreign reserves: €2.92 billion (August 2024)
- Budget balance: €-2.796 billion deficit (2025); -3.0% of GDP (2025)
- Revenue: 47.1% of GDP (2025)
- Spending: 50.1% of GDP (2025)
- Economic aid: €10.74 billion from European Structural and Investment Funds (2014–2020)
- Credit rating: Standard & Poor's: A (Long Term); A-1 (Short Term); Outlook: Stable (2026); Fitch: A−; Outlook: Stable (2026); Moody's: A3; Outlook: Stable (2024); Scope: A−; Outlook: Positive (2026)
- All values, unless otherwise stated, are in US dollars.

Croatia has a highly developed mixed economy. It is one of the largest economies in Southeast Europe by nominal gross domestic product (GDP). It maintains a similarly high regional GDP per capita. It is an open economy with an accommodative foreign policy, highly dependent on international trade in Europe. Within Croatia, economic development varies among its counties, with the strongest growth in Central Croatia and its financial centre, Zagreb. It has a very high level of human development, low levels of income inequality, and a high quality of life. Croatia's labor market has been perennially inefficient, with an underdeveloped investment climate and an ineffective corporate and income tax system.

Croatia's economic history is closely linked to its historic nation-building efforts. Its pre-industrial economy leveraged the country's geography and natural resources to guide agricultural growth. The 1800s saw a shipbuilding boom, railroading, and widespread industrialization. During the 1900s, Croatia entered a planned economy (with socialism) in 1941 and a command economy (with communism) during World War II. It underwent rapid urbanization in the 1950s and decentralized in 1965, diversifying its economy before the independence of Croatia in 1990. The Croatian War of Independence (1991–95) curbed 21–25% of wartime GDP, leaving behind a developing transition economy.

The modern Croatian economy is considered high-income, dominated by its tertiary service and industry sectors which account for 70% of GDP. Tourism in Croatia routinely generates 10% to 15% of total GDP. An emerging energy power in Europe, it has strategic investments in liquefied natural gas, geothermal networks, and electric transport. It supports regional economic activity via transportation networks along the Adriatic Sea and throughout European corridors. It is a member of the Eurozone and Schengen Area. Croatia has free-trade agreements with many world nations and is part of the WTO (2000) and EEA (2013).

== History ==
=== Up to the 20th century ===
When Croatia was still part of the Austro-Hungarian Empire, its economy maintained a large agricultural sector with industrialization spreading through larger cities. The Kingdom of Croatia had a high ratio of population working on farmland. Many industrial branches developed in that time, like forestry and wood industry (stave fabrication, the production of potash, lumber mills, shipbuilding). The most profitable one was stave fabrication, the boom of which started in the 1820s with the clearing of the oak forests around Karlovac and Sisak and again in the 1850s with the marshy oak masses along the Sava and Drava rivers. Shipbuilding in Croatia played a significant role in the 1850s Austrian Empire, especially the long-range sailing boats. Sisak and Vukovar were the major centers of river-shipbuilding. Slavonia was mostly an agricultural land and was known for its silk production. Agriculture and the breeding of cattle were the most profitable occupations of locals. The region produced corn of all kinds, hemp, flax, tobacco, and great quantities of licorice.

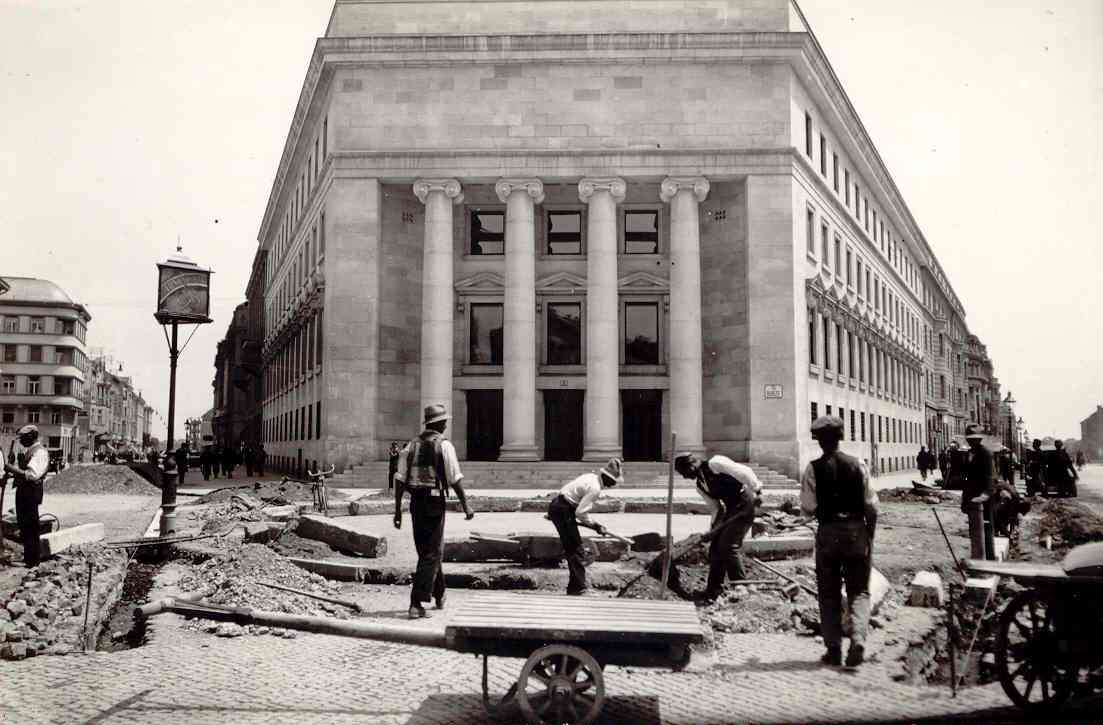
Croatian National Bank, 1927

Initial industrialization began in the 1830s and in the following decades the construction of big industrial enterprises took place. During the mid-19th and early-20th centuries there was an upsurge of industry in Croatia, strengthened by the construction of railways and the electric-power production. Industrialization was faster in central Croatia than in other regions, while Dalmatia remained one of the least developed provinces of Austria-Hungary. In 1918 Croatia became part of the Kingdom of Yugoslavia, which was, during the interwar period, one of the least developed countries in Europe. Most of its industry was based in Drava Banovina (Slovenia) and Banovina of Croatia, but further industrial development was modest and centered on textile mills, sawmills, brick yards and food-processing plants. The economy was still traditionally based on agriculture, with laborers accounting for more than half of Croatia's population. In 1941 the Independent State of Croatia (NDH), a World War II puppet state of Germany and Italy, was established in parts of Axis-occupied Yugoslavia. The economic system of NDH was based on the concept of "Croatian socialism". The main characteristic of the new system was the concept of a planned economy with high levels of state involvement in economic life. As the war progressed the government kept printing more money and its amount in circulation was rapidly increasing, resulting in high inflation rates. After the NDH was expelled from Croatia during World War II, the new Communist Party of Yugoslavia converted to a command economy on the Soviet model of rapid industrial development. By 1948 almost all domestic and foreign-owned capital had been nationalized. The industrialization plan relied on high taxation, fixed prices, war reparations, and export of food and raw materials. Forced collectivization of agriculture was initiated in 1949.

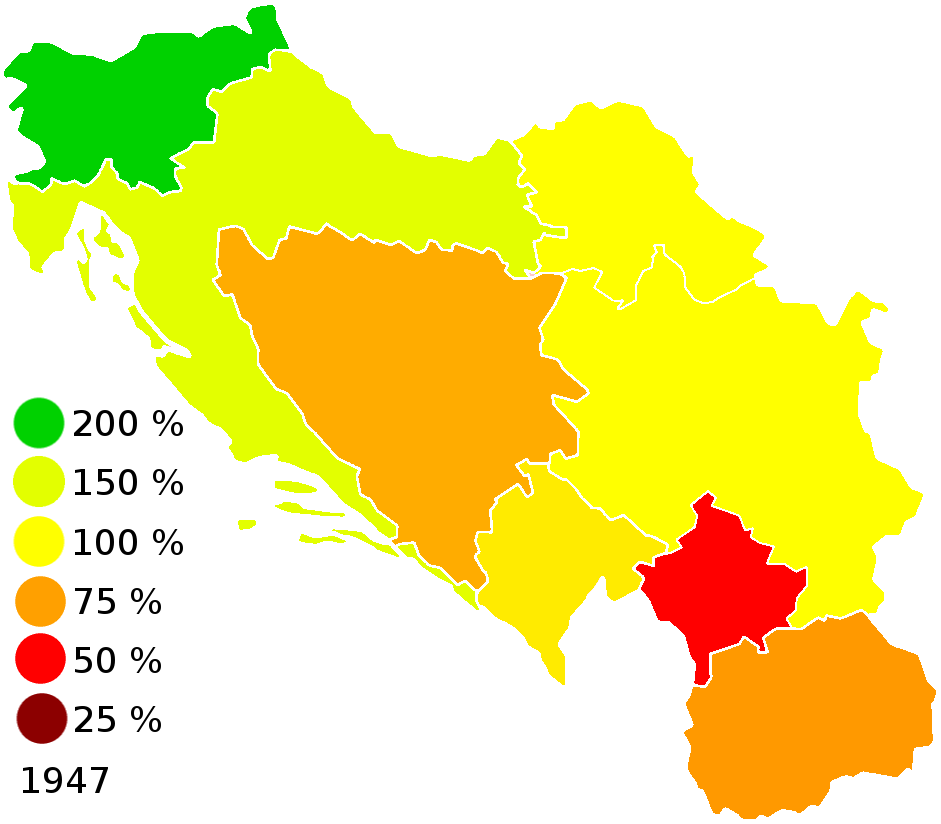
Croatia's economic development (light green) in 1947 as part of Socialist Yugoslavia.

Throughout the 1950s, the Socialist Republic of Croatia experienced rapid urbanization. In 1965, its national economy decentralized which spurred growth of several sectors including a prosperous tourist industry. Following its northern neighbor, the Socialist Republic of Slovenia, Croatia had the second-highest GDP-per-capita from 1953 to 1989. It generated 41% higher GDP-per-capita than the Yugoslav average. Croatia generated 28.5% of Yugoslav GDP or $37.05billion in 1990. Croatia and Slovenia accounted for nearly half of the total Yugoslav GDP and reflected a significantly higher standard of living. In the mid-1960s, Yugoslavia lifted emigration restrictions and the number of emigrants increased rapidly. In 1971, nearly 224,722 workers from Croatia were employed abroad, mostly in West Germany. Foreign remittances contributed $2 billion annually to the Croatian economy by 1990. This, coupled with austerity programs and hyperinflation in the 1980s, led to discontent in both Croatia and Slovenia which eventually fueled its independence movement.

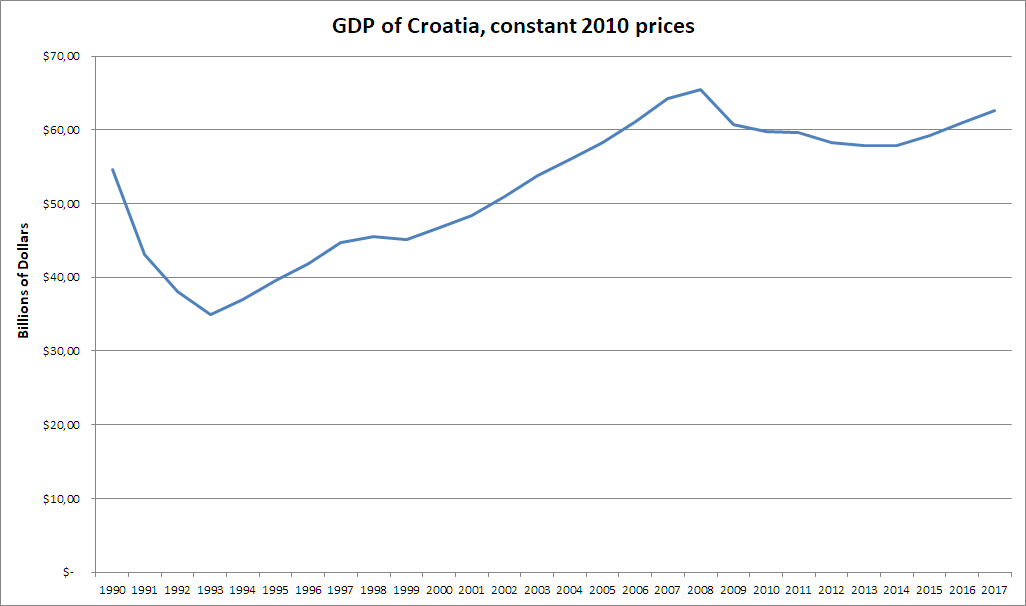
GDP of Croatia at constant 2010 prices from 1990 to 2017

In the late 1980s and early 1990s, with the collapse of socialism and the beginning of economic transition, Croatia faced considerable economic stagnation. This included inefficient privatization, the disruption of free trade as well as a large refugee and displaced population, both Croatian and Bosnian. Shortly after Croatia gained independence in 1995, the country entered into an economic recession stemming from fallout related to the broader Yugoslavian economy. During the related Yugoslav Wars, Croatian infrastructure sustained large-scale damage in from 1991 to 1992, especially their revenue-rich tourism industry. The privatization of sovereign assets and transformation from a planned economy to a market economy was unsteady, largely as a result of public mistrust when many state-owned companies were sold to politically well-connected at below-market prices. With the end of the war, Croatia's economy recovered moderately, but lingering corruption stymied economic reforms and foreign investment.

The early 1990s experienced high inflation. In 1991, the Croatian dinar was introduced as a transitional currency, but inflation continued to accelerate. The anti-inflationary stabilization steps in 1993 decreased retail price inflation from a monthly rate of 38.7% to 1.4%, and by the end of the year, Croatia experienced deflation. In 1994, Croatia introduced the kuna as its currency. The central government budget was in surplus in 1997, most of which was used to repay foreign debt. Public debt-to-GDP had fallen from 27.30% to 26.20% at the end of 1998. The consumer-driven economic boom was disrupted in mid-1998, as a result of a banking crisis that saw 14 banks insolvent.

=== 21st century ===
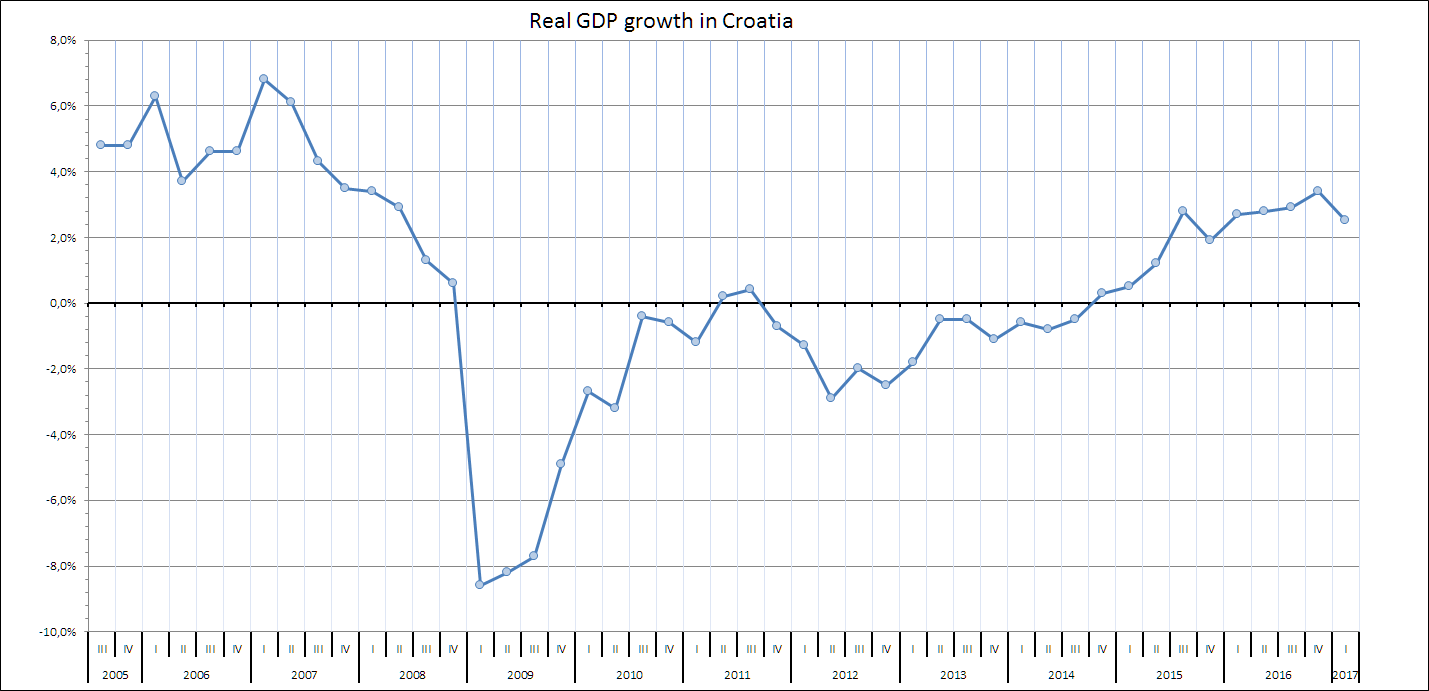
Real GDP growth in Croatia 2005–2015

Croatia emerged from economic recession in 1999, with growth reaccelerating in 2000 through a number of structural reforms. Economic growth in the 2000s was stimulated by a credit boom led by newly privatized banks, capital investment, especially in road construction, a rebound in tourism and credit-driven consumer spending. In 2003, the nation's economy would officially recover to the amount of GDP it had in 1990. Unemployment continued falling, powered by growing industrial production and expanding economic output. Between 2003 and 2007, Croatia's private-sector share of GDP increased from 60% to 70%. Economic growth declined due to the global 2008 financial crisis. After initially the avoiding severe economic disruption neighboring countries faced, Croatia saw a decline in GDP growth from 2009 to 2010, falling flat in 2011. The slow pace of privatization of state-owned businesses and sensitive tourism sector continued to drag on the economy.

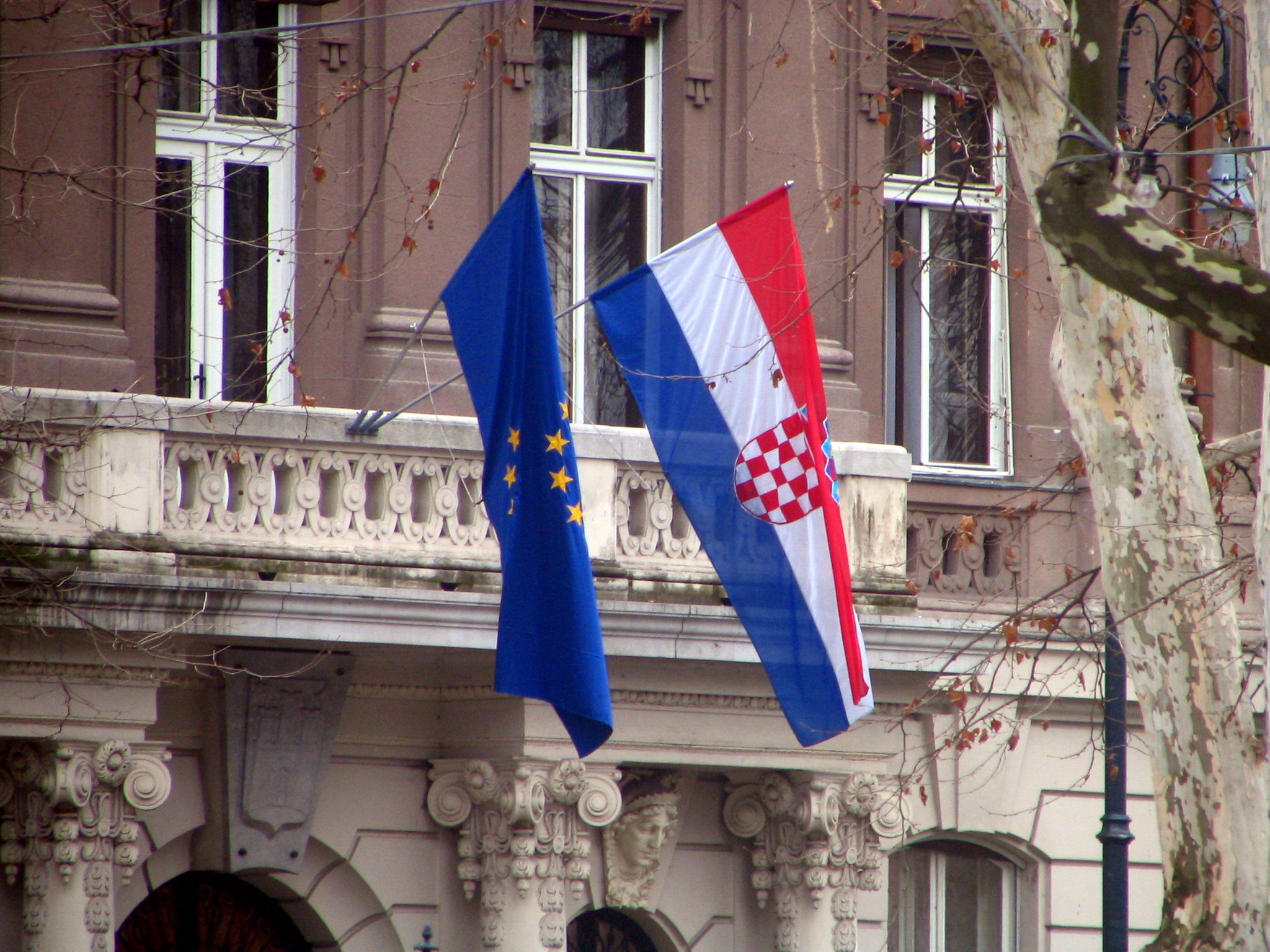
Croatia joined the European economic bloc in 2013

Croatia joined the European Union on 1 July 2013 as the 28th member state. The Croatian economy rapidly integrated with the rest of continental EU states, becoming more sensitive to international trade. Italy, Germany and Slovenia became Croatia's most important trade partners. The annual average unemployment rate spiked in 2014 at 17.3%, the third-highest unemployment rate in the EU, after Greece (26.5%), and Spain (24.%). Croatia's heavily backlogged judiciary system, combined with inefficient public administration, especially regarding the issues of land ownership and corruption in the public sector remained a key challenge. Throughout 2015 to 2020, the Croatian economy continued to see positive economic growth. Excess tax receipts in 2016 enabled the repayment of debt and narrowed the current account deficit.

The economy was heavily impacted by the COVID-19 pandemic in 2020 which curbed its revenue-rich tourism sector. During this period, 400,000 workers filed for economic aid and the European Commission estimated an annual economic loss of 9.6%. Later that year, capital city Zagreb was struck by a major earthquake which caused severe infrastructure damage. In 2021, ahead of Croatia's ascension into the Eurozone, the nation posted record gains in exports, industrial production, and credit rating. Its debut automotive industry was formed with the advent of Rimac Automobili in Sveta Nedelja. Croatia's digital economy increased by 16% on average annually from 2019 to 2021. It was estimated that by 2030 its value could reach 15% of total GDP, with the IT sector being the main driver of that growth. Croatia joined the Eurozone and Schengen Area in 2022, with the country adopting the Euro currency in 2023.

== GDP ==
The Croatian economy is expected to grow to $140 billion by 2029, as measured by nominal gross domestic product (GDP). It is one of the largest economies in Southeast Europe by nominal GDP. It maintains a similarly high regional nominal GDP-per-capita. Since 1998, Croatia has been the largest economy of former Yugoslavia by nominal GDP according to the IMF. It has been the second-largest economy of former Yugoslavia by purchasing power parity (PPP) since 2008. It has been the second-wealthiest former Yugoslav republic by GDP-per-capita since 1992. From 2022 to 2025, Croatia has maintained average annual GDP growth of 4.8%, outperforming the majority of fellow EU member states. It has a forecasted GDP growth rate of 2% to 3% from 2026 to 2029 per S&P Global and the European Commission. Economic growth in Croatia is dependent on high levels of public investment and consumption, with key challenges around productivity and labor market inefficiency.

== Sectors ==
The largest economic sectors in Croatia have been tertiary service, followed by retail and trade since 2022.

=== Industry ===
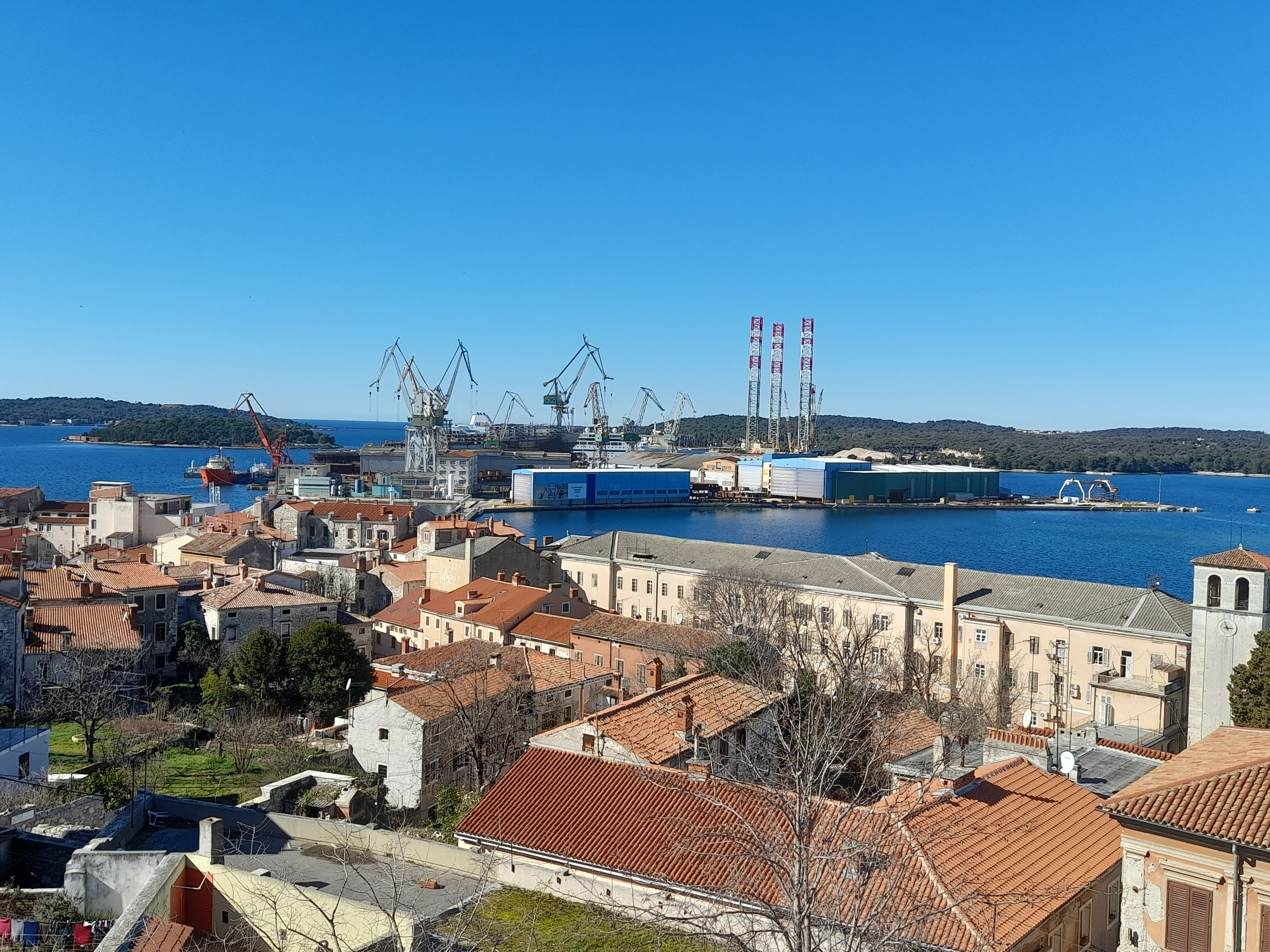
Uljanik shipyard

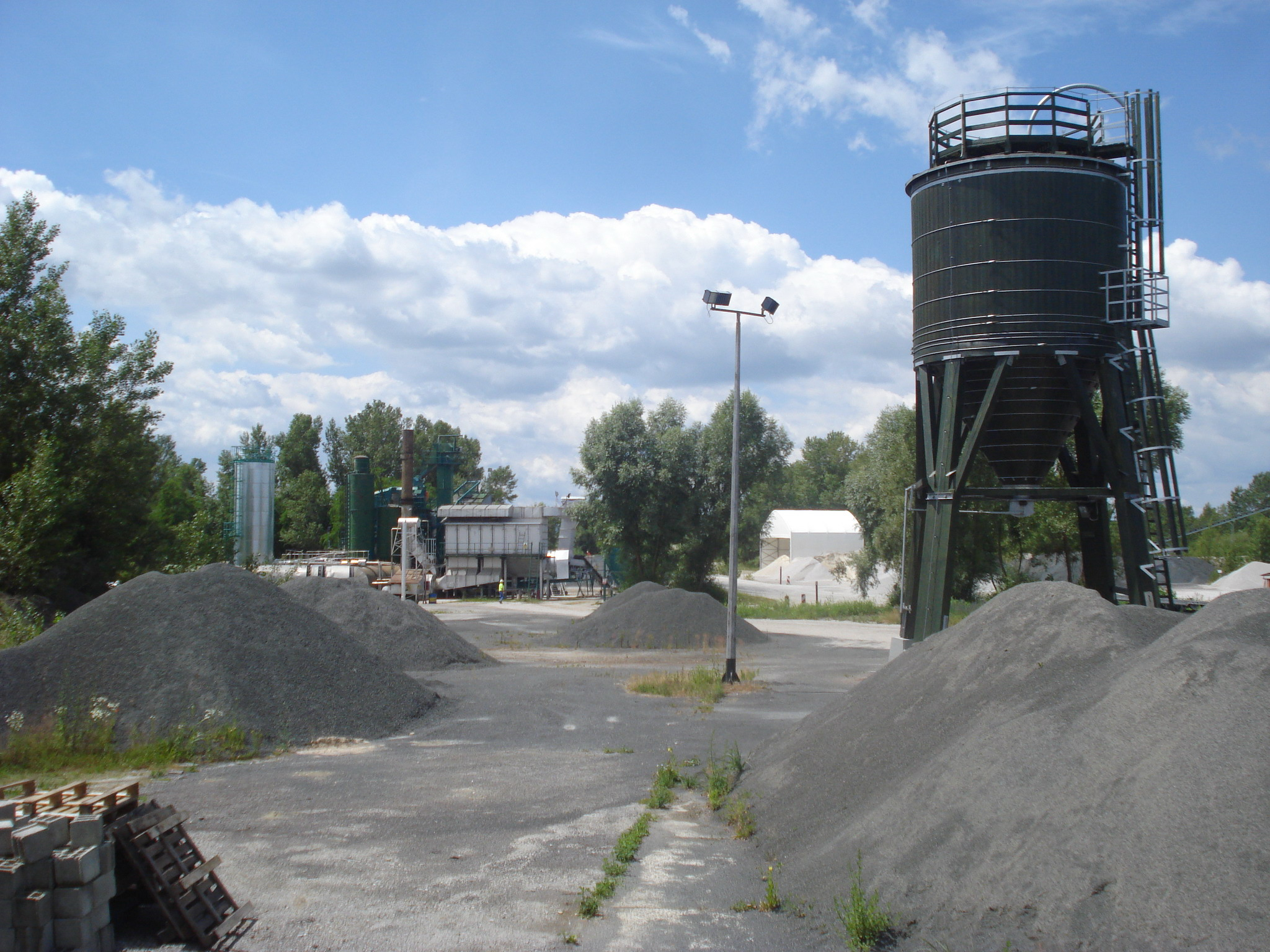
Asphalt plant in Ivanovec

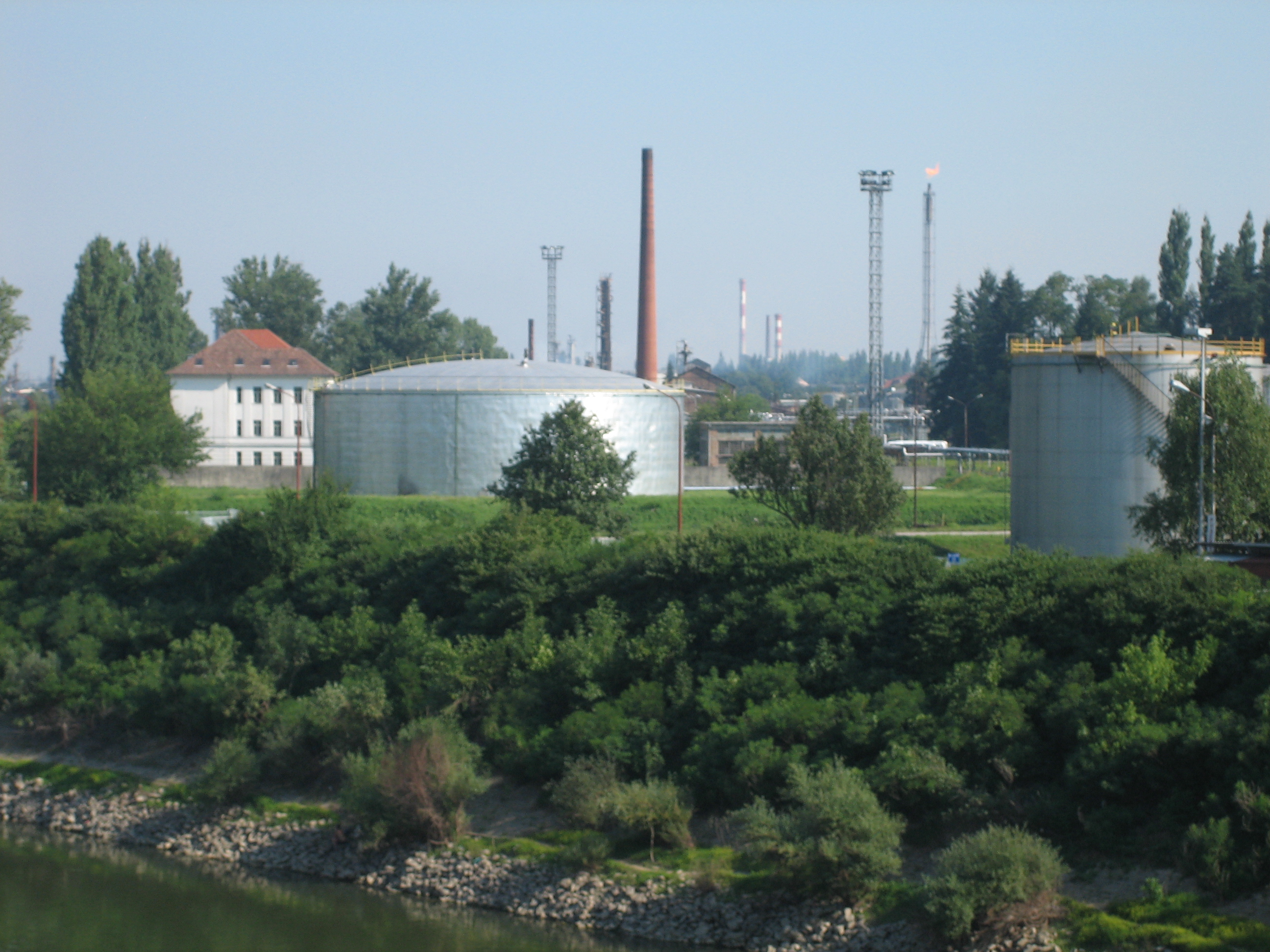
Sisak oil refinery

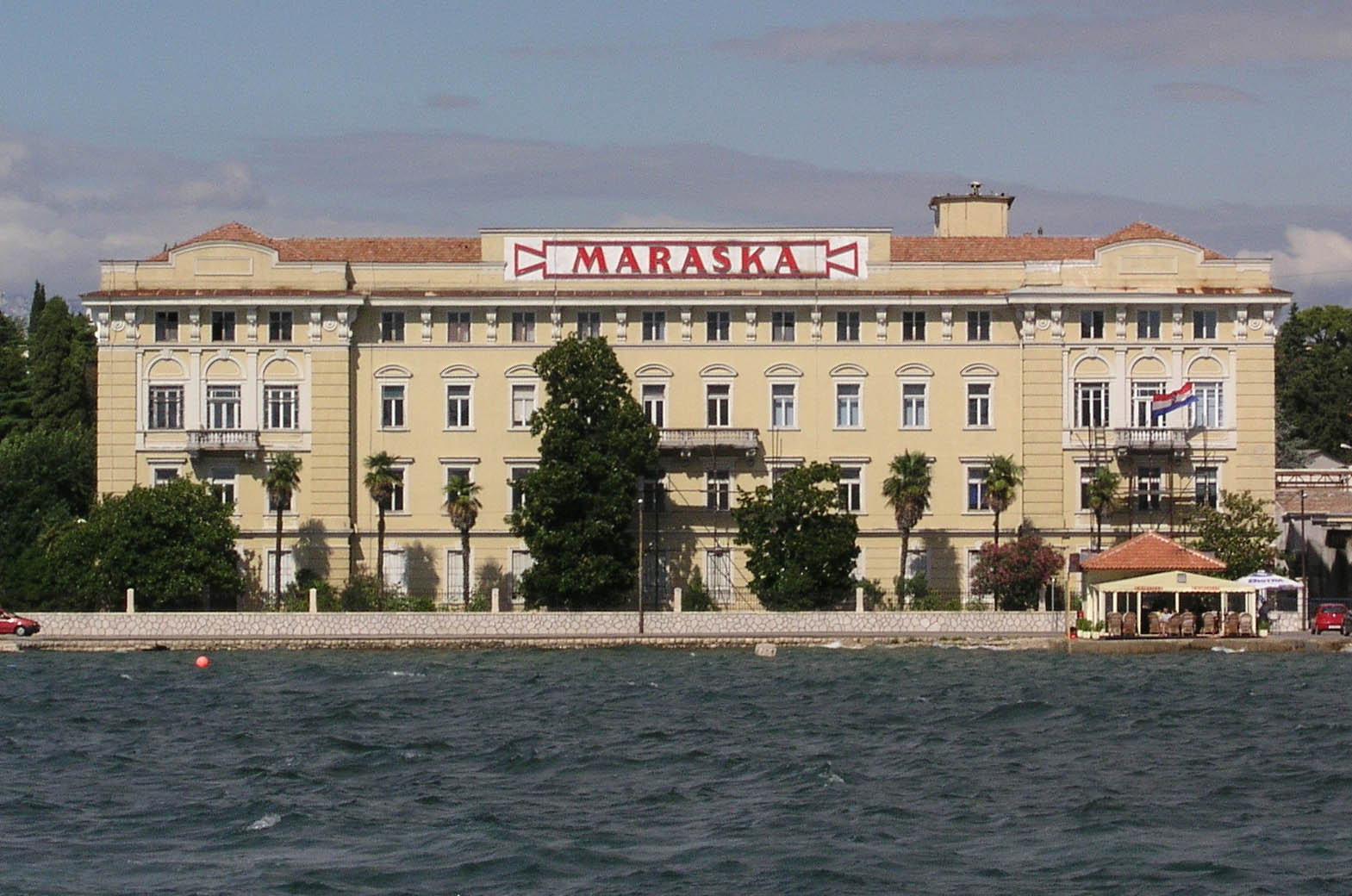
Maraska liqueur factory in Zadar

The industrial production of Croatia has historically played an important role in the country's economy. It has a longstanding tradition based since the 19th century on agriculture, forestry and mining. Many industrial branches developed at that time, like wood industry, food manufacturing, potash production, shipbuilding, leather and footwear production, textile industry, and others. It typically constitutes around 20% of overall economic output, with an average annual growth rate of 3-4%.

=== Tourism ===
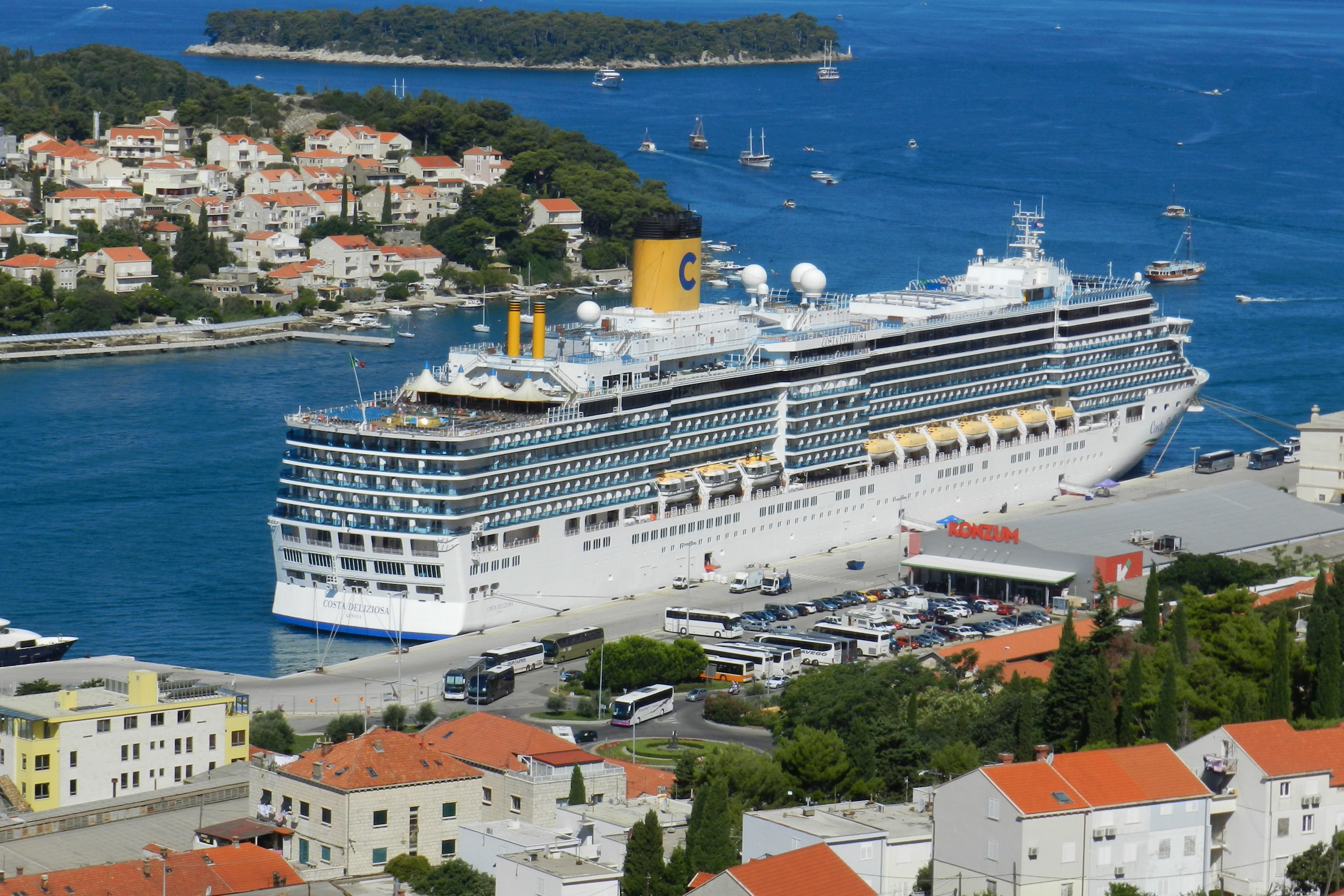
Cruise ship in Dubrovnik

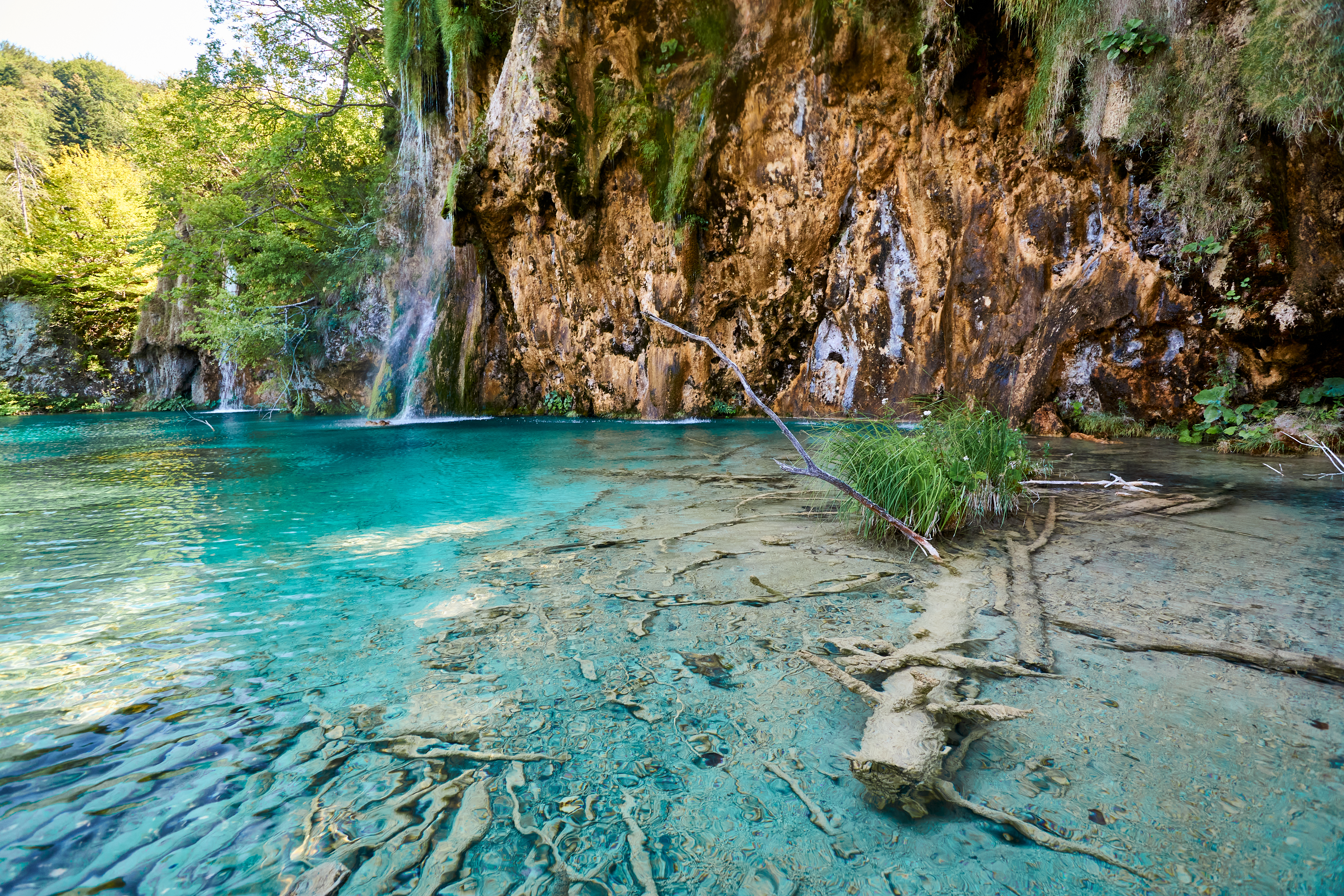
Plitvice Lakes National Park

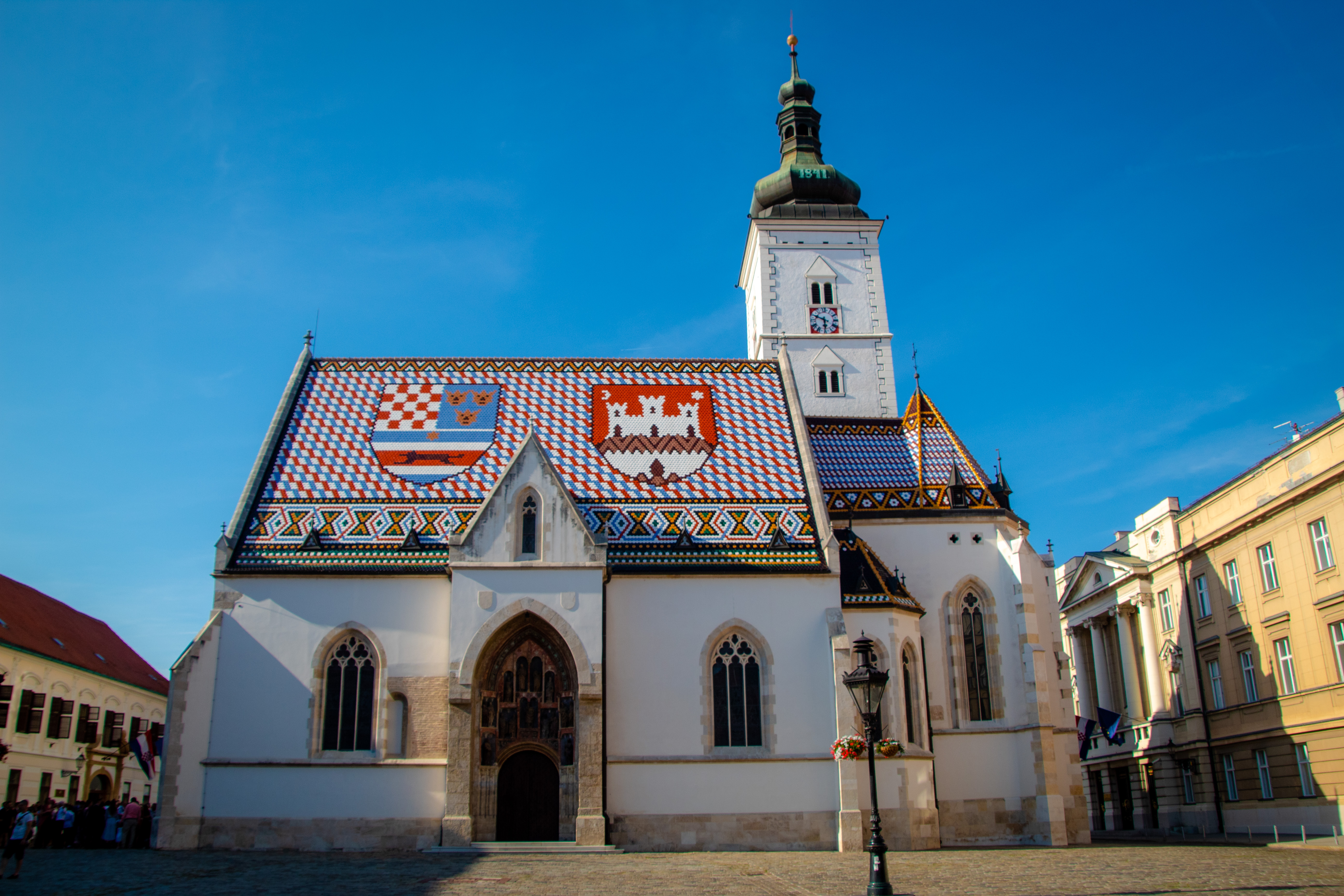
St. Mark's Church in Zagreb

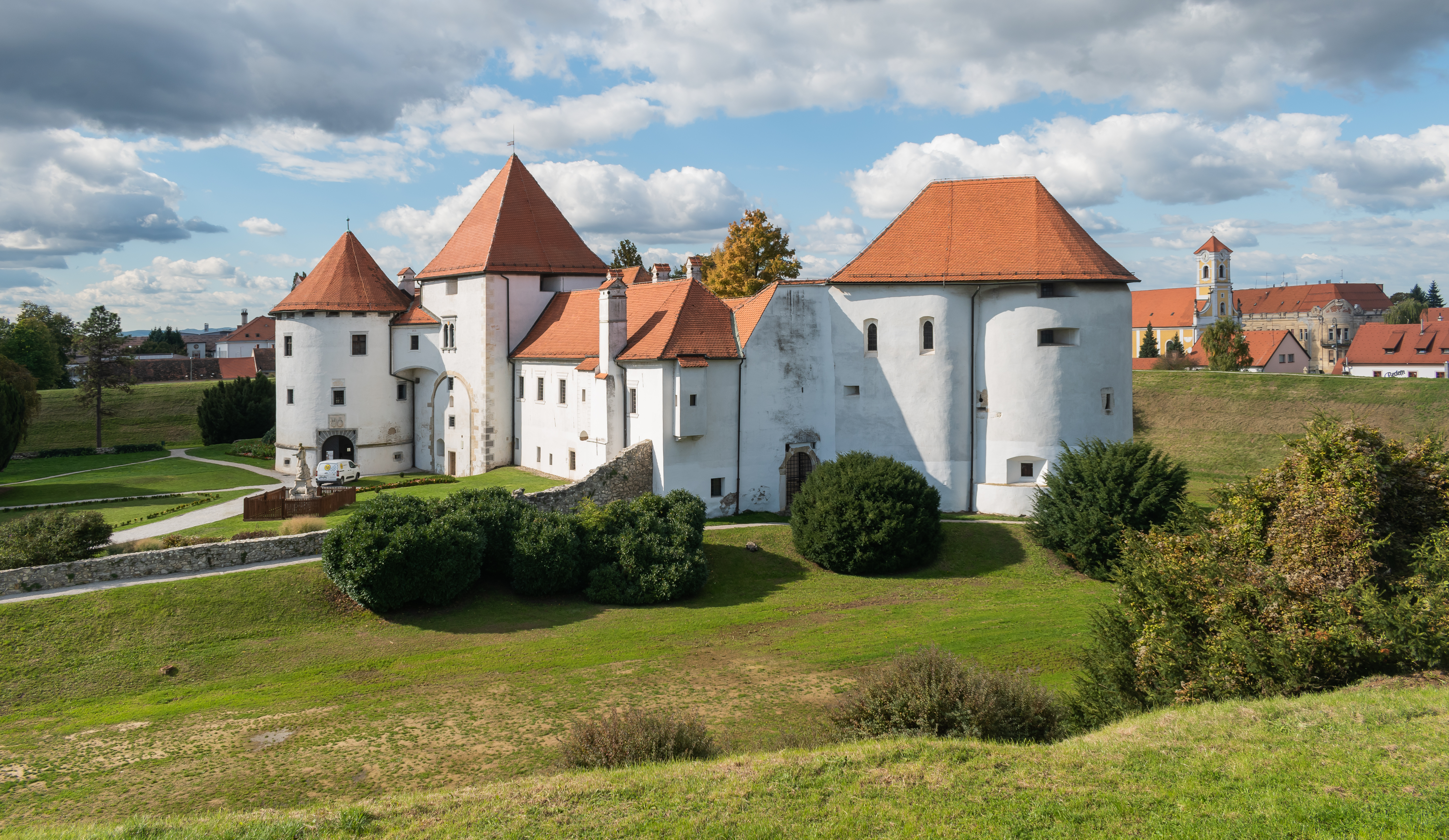
Varaždin Old Town

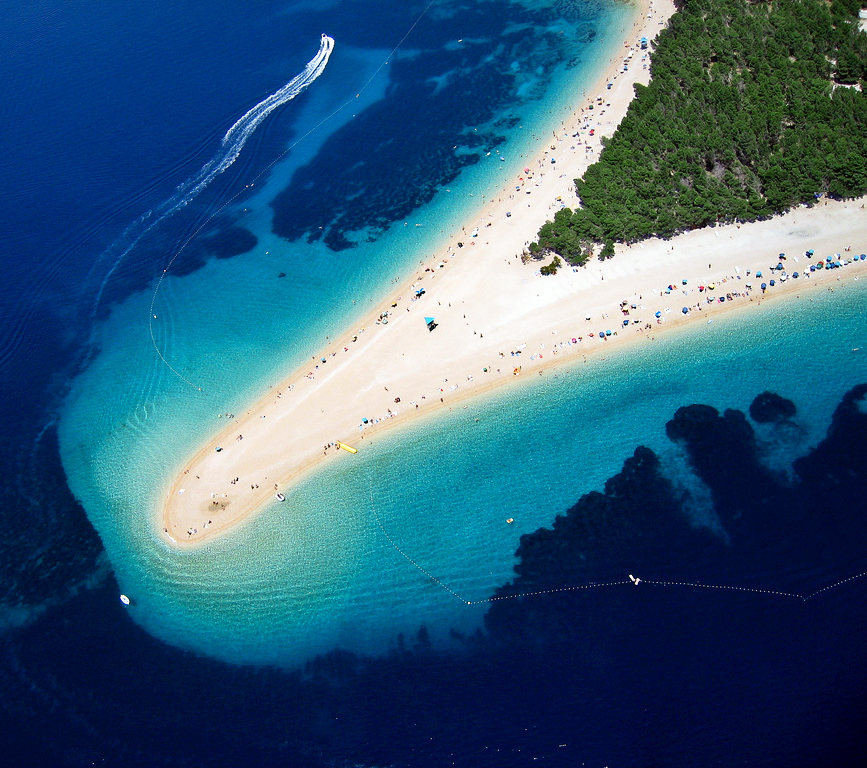
Zlatni Rat beach on the island of Brač

Tourism is a major industry and economic sector. It routinely generates 10% to 15% of total GDP. A total of 20.2 million tourists visited in 2024. In 2025, Croatia was the ninth-most-visited state in the EU and third-most-visited in Southern Europe. Its positive effects are felt throughout the economy in terms of increased business volume observed in retail business, processing industry orders and summer seasonal employment. The industry is considered an export business, because it significantly reduces the country's external trade imbalance. Inflation and overtourism has led to increased travel regulations and tourist costs since 2024. Eurostat estimated that nearly 55% of EU tourist accommodation is between Croatia (117,000) and neighboring Italy (230,000).

=== Agriculture ===
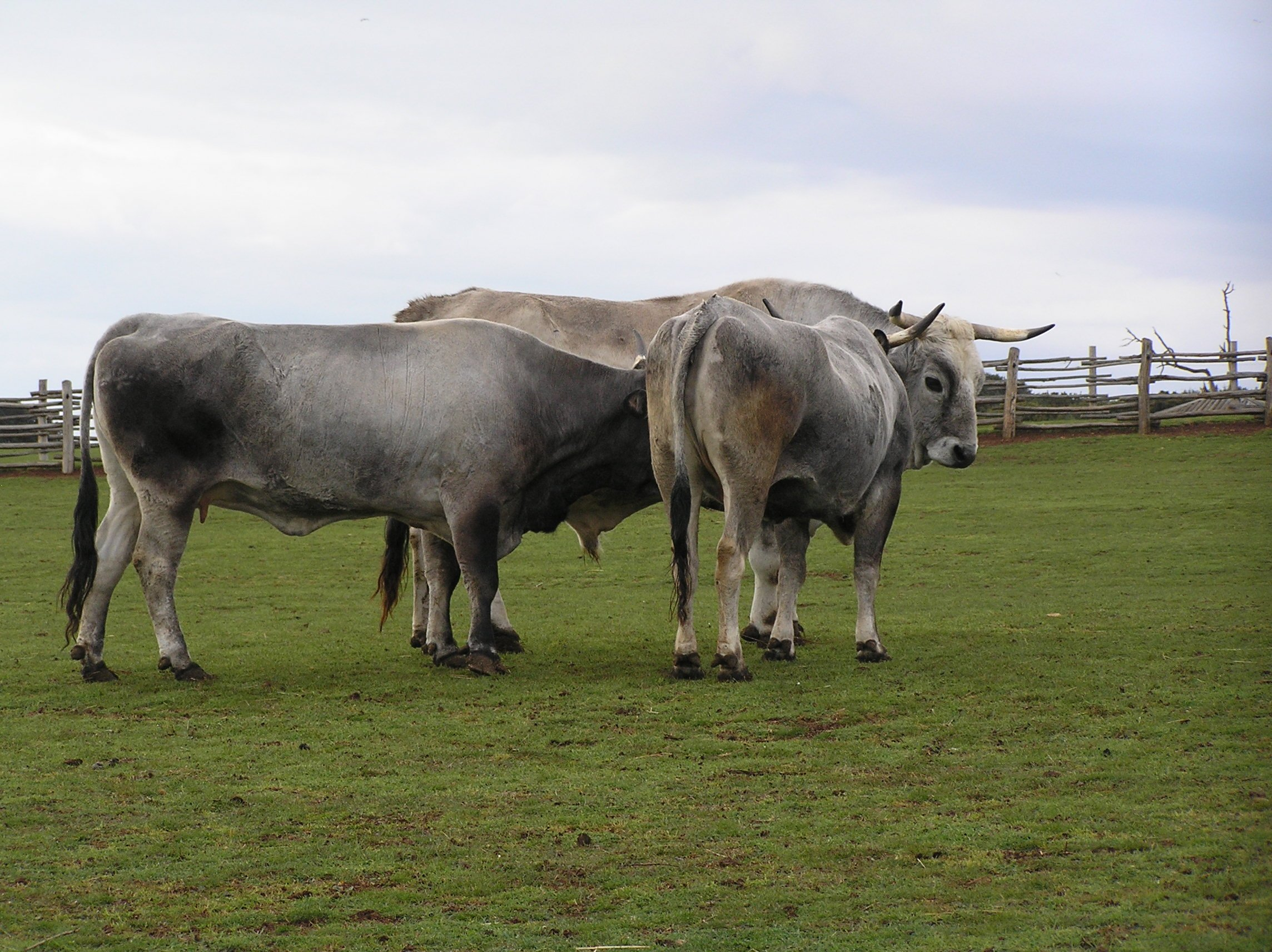
Boškarin cattle

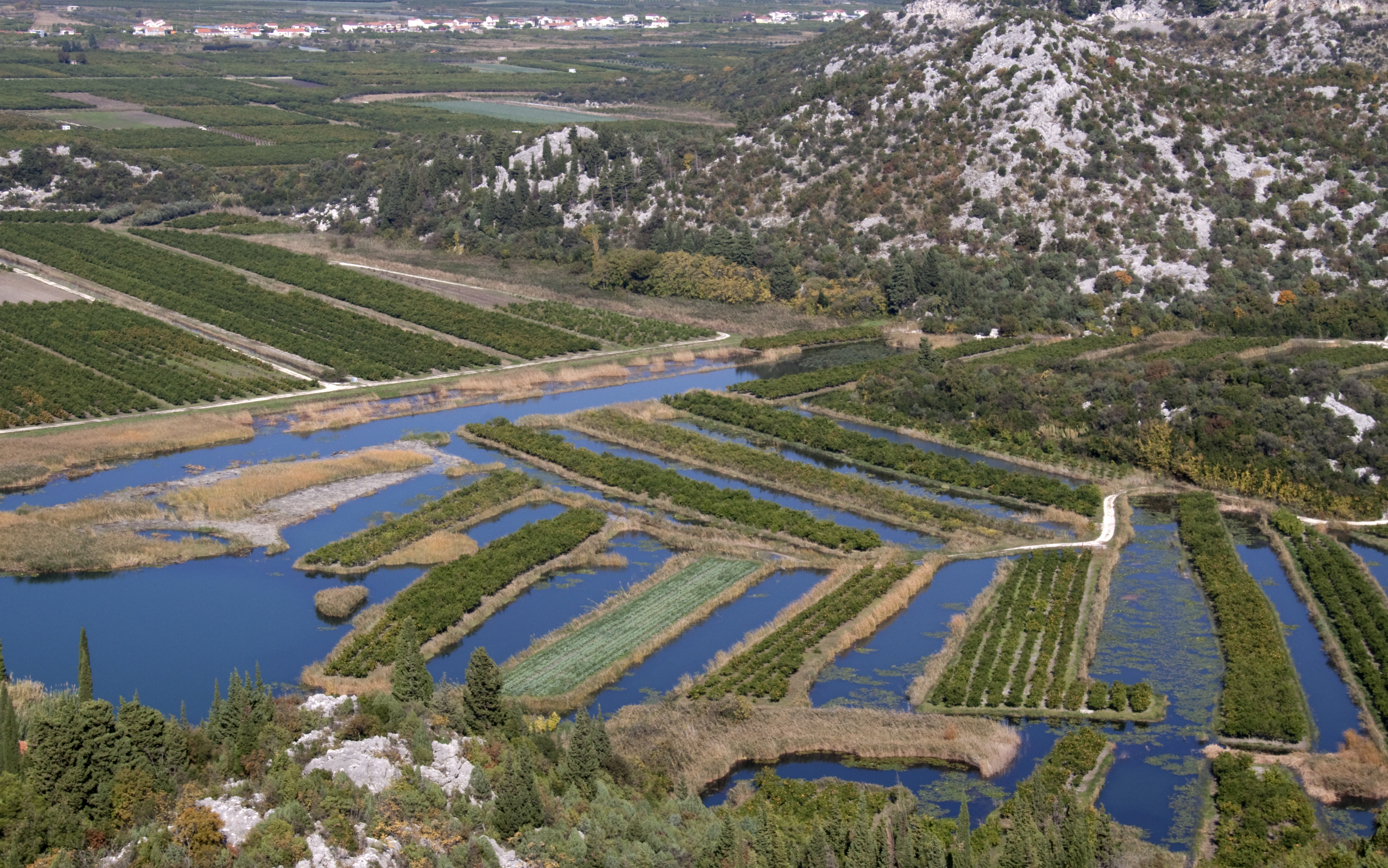
Plantations in the fertile Neretva valley

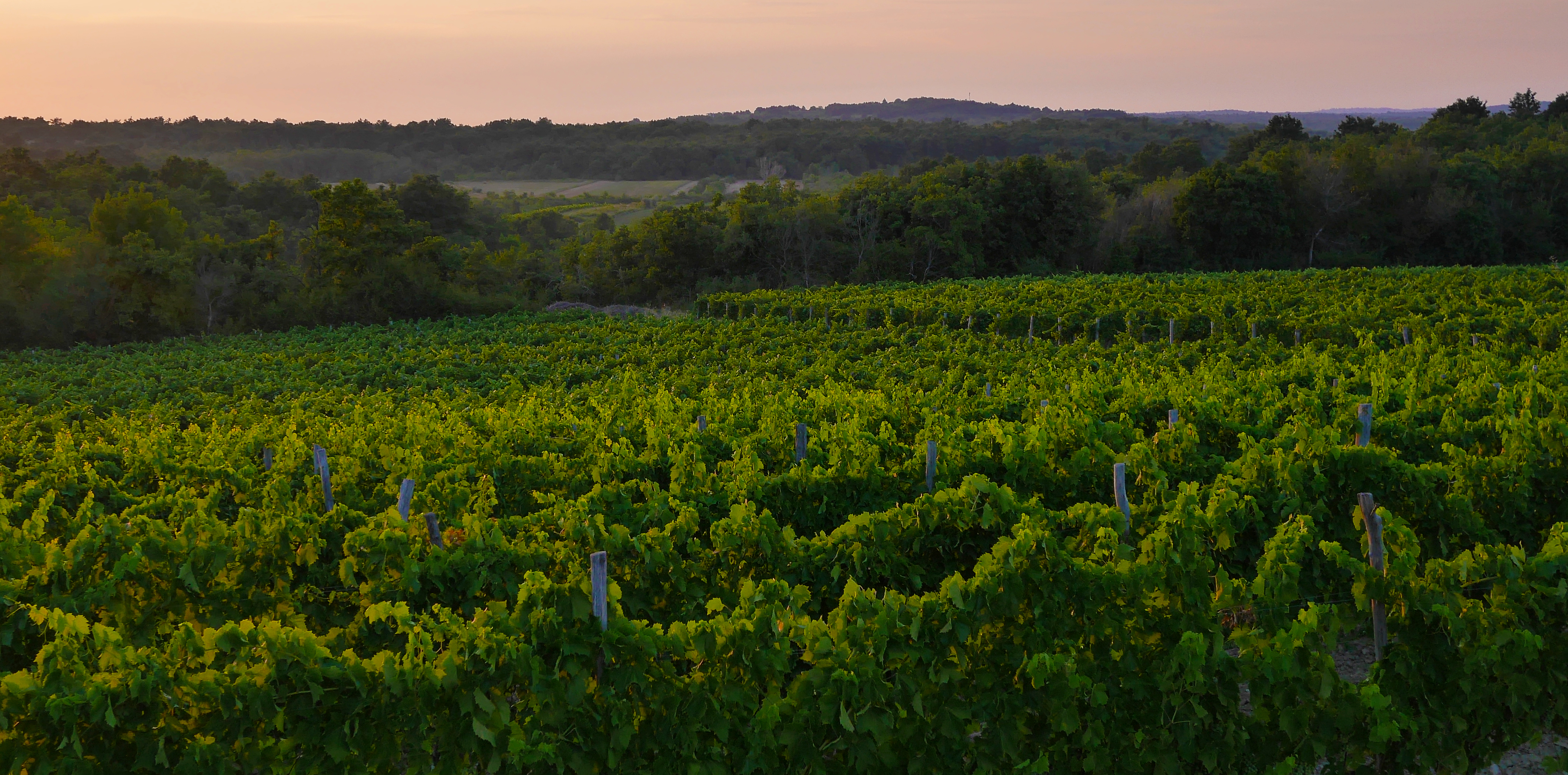
Vineyards of Istria

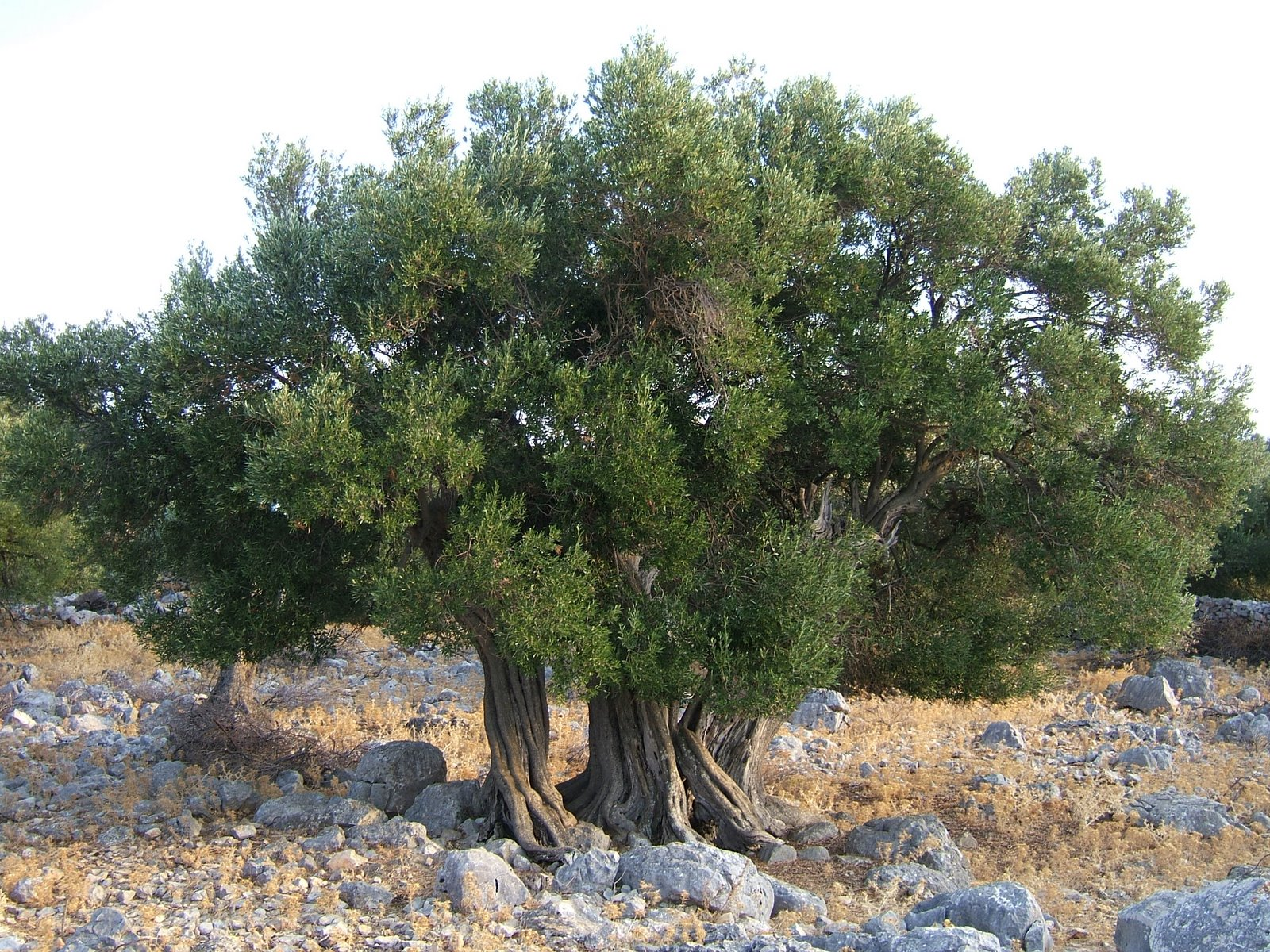
Olive trees of Lun

Croatian agricultural sector subsists from exports of blue water fish, which in recent years experienced a tremendous surge in demand, mainly from Japan and South Korea. Croatia is a notable producer of organic foods and much of it is exported to the European Union. Croatian wines, olive oil and lavender are particularly sought after. Value of Croatia's agriculture sector is around 3.1 billion according to preliminary data released by the national statistics office. Croatia has around 1.72 million hectares of agricultural land; totally utilized land for agricultural in 2020 was around 1.506 million hectares, of these permanent pasture land constituted 536,000 hectares or some 35.5% of total land available to agriculture.

=== Transport ===
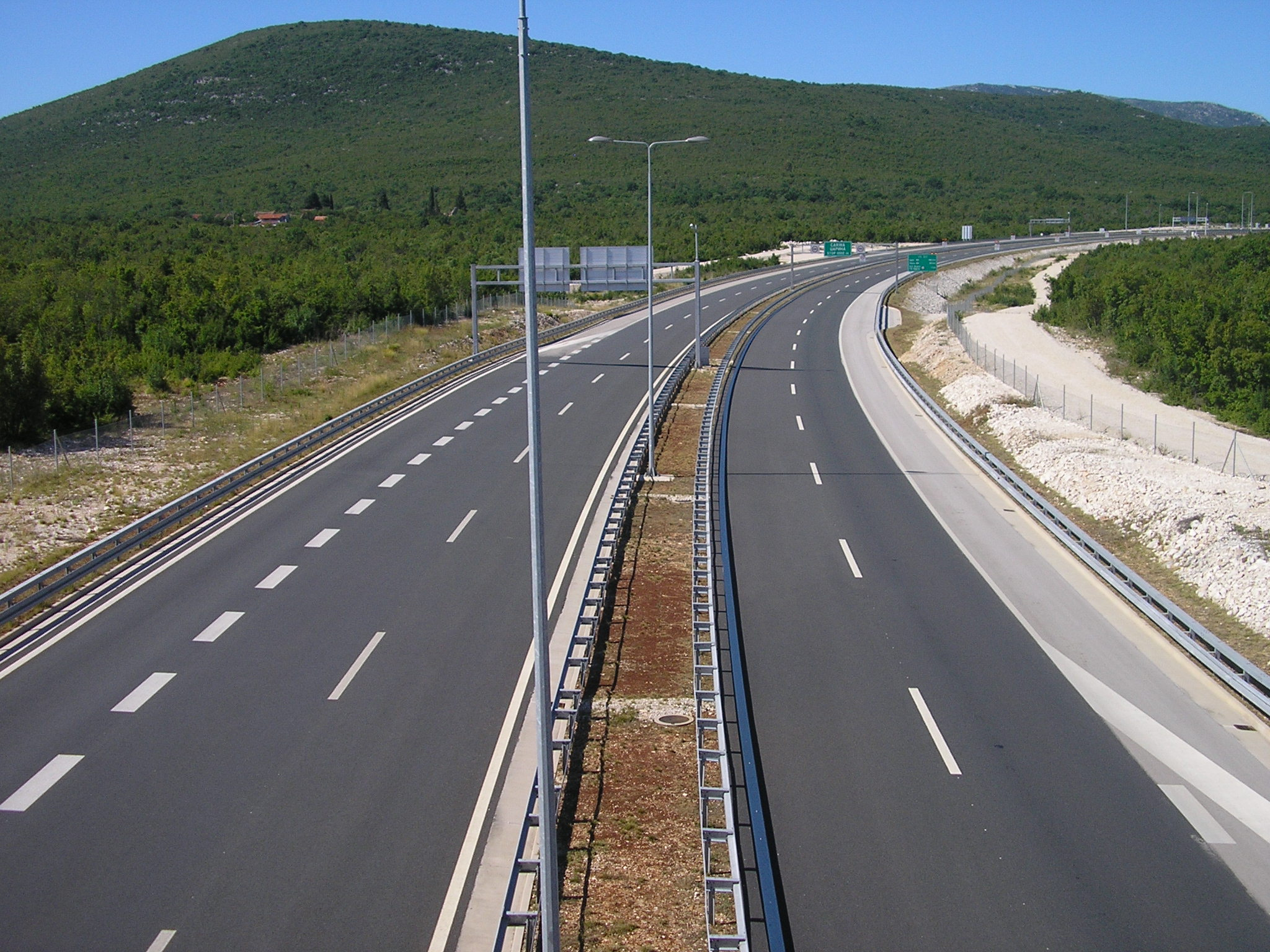
The country's longest motorway, A1

The highlight of Croatia's recent infrastructure developments is its rapidly developed motorway network, largely built in the late 1990s and especially in the 2000s. By January 2022, Croatia had completed more than 1,300 kilometres (810 miles) of motorways, connecting Zagreb to most other regions and following various European routes and four Pan-European corridors. The busiest motorways are the A1, connecting Zagreb to Split and the A3, passing east–west through northwest Croatia and Slavonia. A widespread network of state roads in Croatia acts as motorway feeder roads while connecting all major settlements in the country. The high quality and safety levels of the Croatian motorway network were tested and confirmed by several EuroTAP and EuroTest programs.

Croatia has an extensive rail network spanning 2,722 kilometres (1,691 miles), including 985 kilometres (612 miles) of electrified railways and 254 kilometres (158 miles) of double track railways. The most significant railways in Croatia are found within the Pan-European transport corridor Vb and corridor X connecting Rijeka to Budapest and Ljubljana to Belgrade, both via Zagreb. All rail services are operated by Croatian Railways.

There are international airports in Zagreb, Zadar, Split, Dubrovnik, Rijeka, Osijek and Pula. As of January 2011, Croatia complies with International Civil Aviation Organization aviation safety standards and the Federal Aviation Administration upgraded it to Category 1 rating. The busiest cargo seaport in Croatia is the Port of Rijeka and the busiest passenger ports are Split and Zadar. In addition to those, a large number of minor ports serve an extensive system of ferries connecting numerous islands and coastal cities in addition to ferry lines to several cities in Italy. The largest river port is Port of Vukovar, located on the Danube, representing the nation's outlet to the Pan-European corridor VII.

=== Defence ===
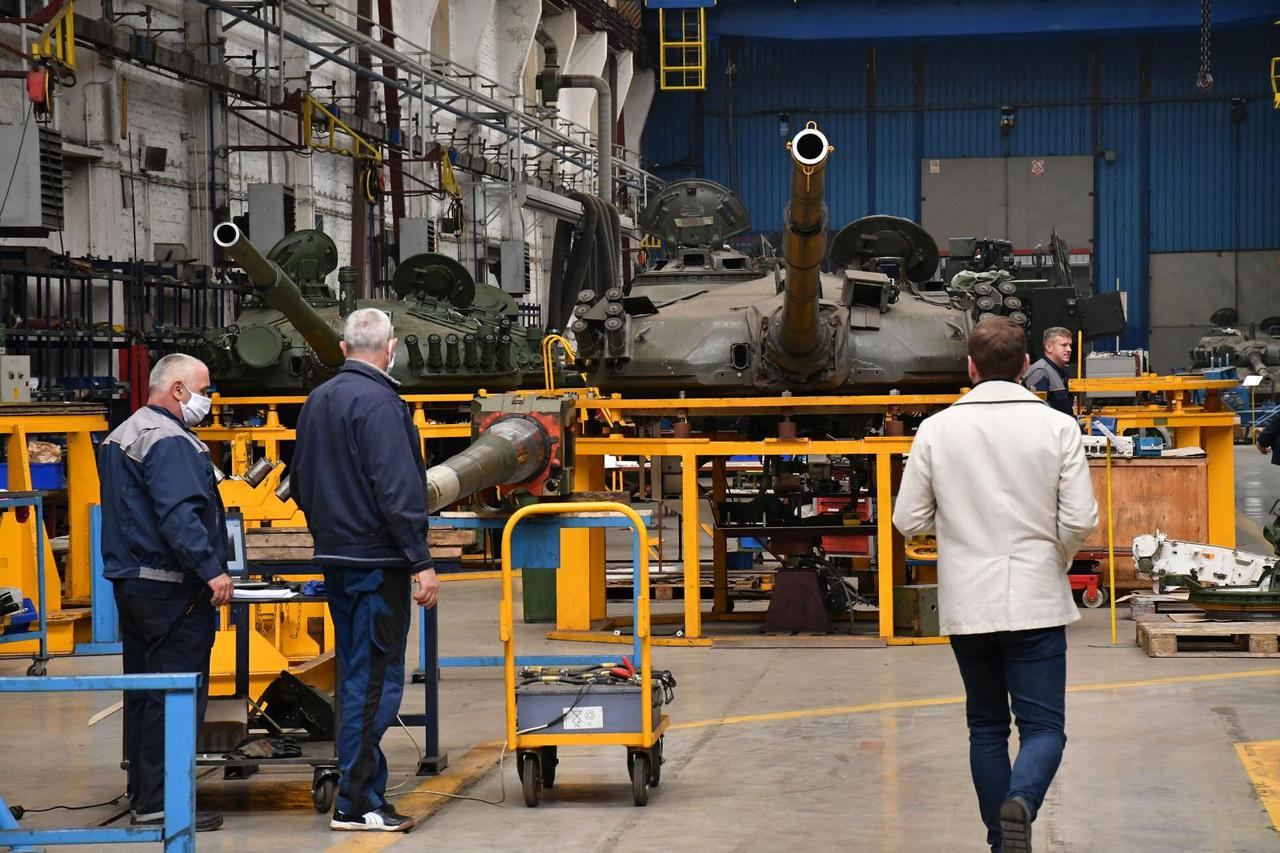
A manufacturing factory of tank turrets at Đuro Đaković in 2024

The Croatian defence sector is an important part of the economy and the country's national security efforts. It has expanded significantly since the 2020s due to economic initiatives and regional geopolitical risk. Upon Croatia's accession into the military alliance NATO in 2009, its defence industrial base has focused on expanding production to meet NATO commitments and autonomous drone systems. Protective gear, advanced robotics, demining hardware, and small firearms have historically been the highest-grossing military exports of the sector.

As of 2024, the Croatian defence industry generated €600 million in annual revenue. It exported €167 million in military assets a year later. Through both public and private sector involvement, this sector consists of 100 companies with a labour force of around 5,000. The Croatian Armed Forces and NATO work closely with many defence contractors and manufacturers.

=== Energy ===
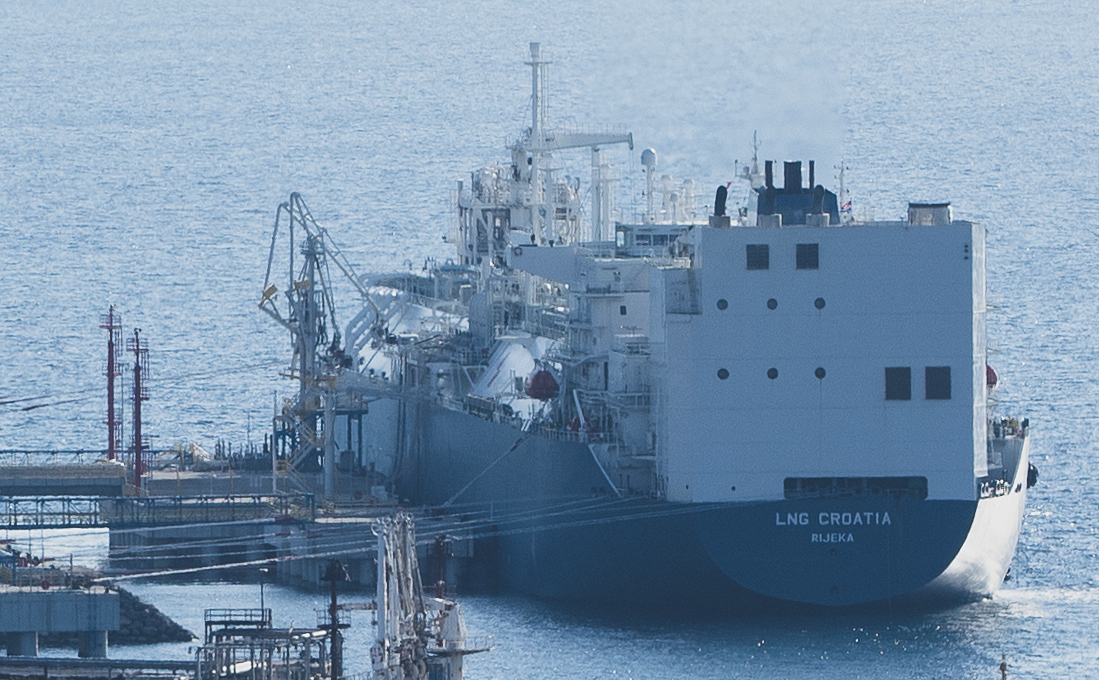
A large LNG Croatia terminal on the coast of Krk island, 2005

The energy sector of Croatia comprises the nation's total energy and electricity production, consumption and import. The majority of energy is generated through hydropower, with the highest quantity of water resources per capita in the European Union (30,000 m^{3}). The country satisfies its domestic electricity needs largely from hydro and thermal power plants. There are 631 kilometres (392 miles) of crude oil pipelines in Croatia, connecting the JANAF oil terminal with refineries in Rijeka and Sisak, as well as several transshipment terminals. The system has a capacity of 20 million tonnes per year. The natural gas transportation system comprises 2,544 kilometres (1,581 miles) of trunk and regional natural gas pipelines, and more than 300 associated structures, connecting production rigs, the Okoli natural gas storage facility, 27 end-users and 37 distribution systems. It operates the Krško nuclear power plant alongside neighboring Slovenia in a joint venture to supply nuclear power to the region.

== Income and wealth ==
The Croatian economy has historically maintained low levels of income inequality with broader wealth inequality steadily increasing since the 2020s. Its tourism sector has significantly influenced personal incomes and asset ownership, particularly in coastal cities. Wages are relatively low and wage growth has been limited, with Croatia's national minimum wage providing baseline support. In 2021 the median disposable income was $19,680 (PPP, per year). Croatia had a gender pay gap of 7.7% and significant gender employment gap in 2022. As of 2026, Croatia's minimum wage sits within the middle of the European Union at a monthly minimum wage of €1,050. It maintains a Gini coefficient of 28.5 – as of 2026 according to Eurostat – which implies moderate and stable disposable income inequality. Financial wealth in Croatia grew annually 7.1% from 2017 to 2022, with an annual growth rate of 5.9% expected through 2027.

== Labour market ==
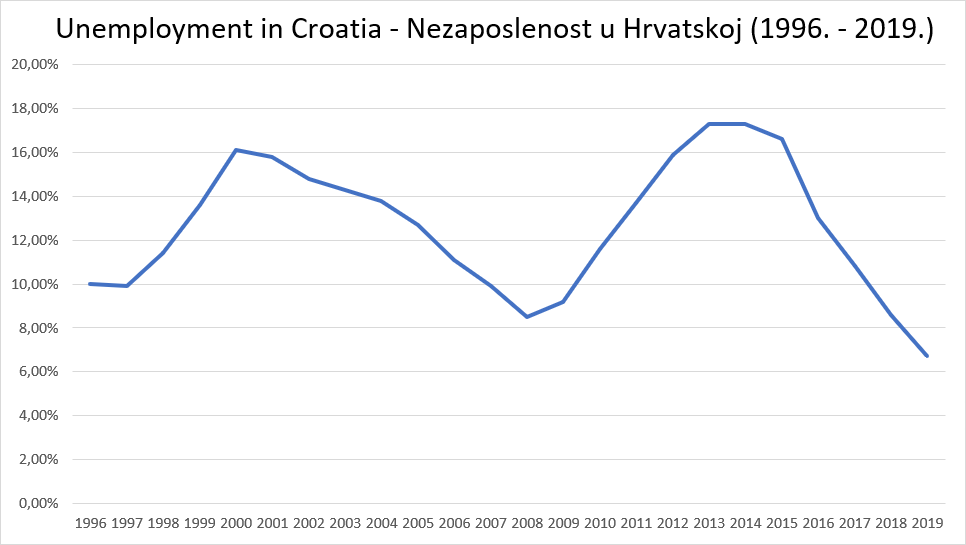
Unemployment rate from 1996 to 2019 according to Eurostat

The Croatian labour market consists of 1.7 million employed workers across all economic sectors. Employment levels in the country are high, with an unemployment rate of 4.3% as of April 2026. The majority (89.5%) of its labour market consists of workers from Croatia with 8.7% being foreign-born. The manufacturing sector claims the highest workforce portion (22.4%) in Croatia. The nation's demographics – in particular high emigration and an aging population – contribute to a shrinking workforce. Since the mid-2020s, the Croatian economy has increasingly relied on foreign-born labour to make up shortfalls in important sectors. Unemployment is highest in Split-Dalmatia County (25,408), Zagreb (18,776) and Osijek-Baranja County (17,318), with these three counties accounting for 39.2% of all Croatian unemployment. It is lowest in Lika-Senj County (1,974), Koprivnica-Križevci County (2,232) and Međimurje County (2,441).

== Banking system ==
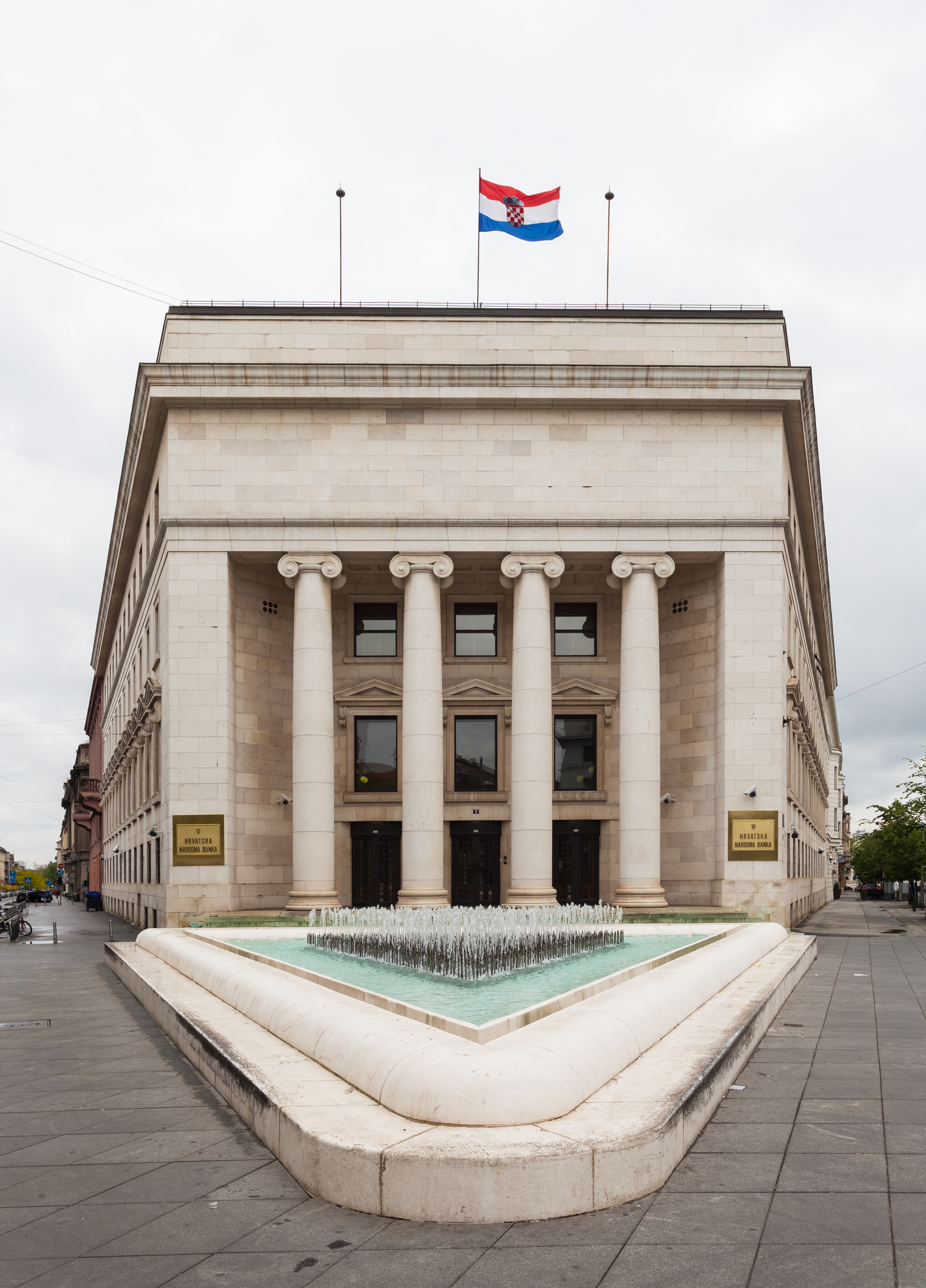
Croatian National Bank Building in Zagreb, 2014

Croatia has a diversified banking system comprising its central bank, financial institutions, a stock exchange, and multiple retail banks.

=== Central bank ===
The country's monetary policy is formulated and implemented by its national bank, based in capital city Zagreb.

- Croatian National Bank (CNB)

=== Stock Exchange ===
The only stock exchange in Croatia, the ZSE, was founded in 1991 with trading commencing a year later.

- Zagreb Stock Exchange (ZSE)

=== Retail banks ===
Retail banks constitute the broader economy's financial sector. These banks operate within the European single market and its related banking union allowing for greater cross-border banking activity.

- Zagrebačka banka (owned by UniCredit from Italy)
- Privredna banka Zagreb (owned by Intesa Sanpaolo from Italy)
- Hrvatska poštanska banka (state-owned by Government of Croatia)
- OTP Banka (owned by OTP Bank from Hungary)
- Raiffeisen Bank Austria (owned by Raiffeisen from Austria)
- Erste & Steiermärkische Bank (former Riječka Banka, owned by Erste Bank from Austria)

== Financial condition ==
The central budget is set by the Croatian government to cover their upcoming fiscal year, which runs from 1 January to 31 December. For 2024, they reported €28.52 billion in revenue with €32.61 billion in expenditure, running a €4.09 billion budget deficit. In 2025, Croatia's expected debt-to-GDP was forecasted to remain at 56% through 2027. Croatia is a creditor nation for the IMF and has financed loans for developing countries since 2026.

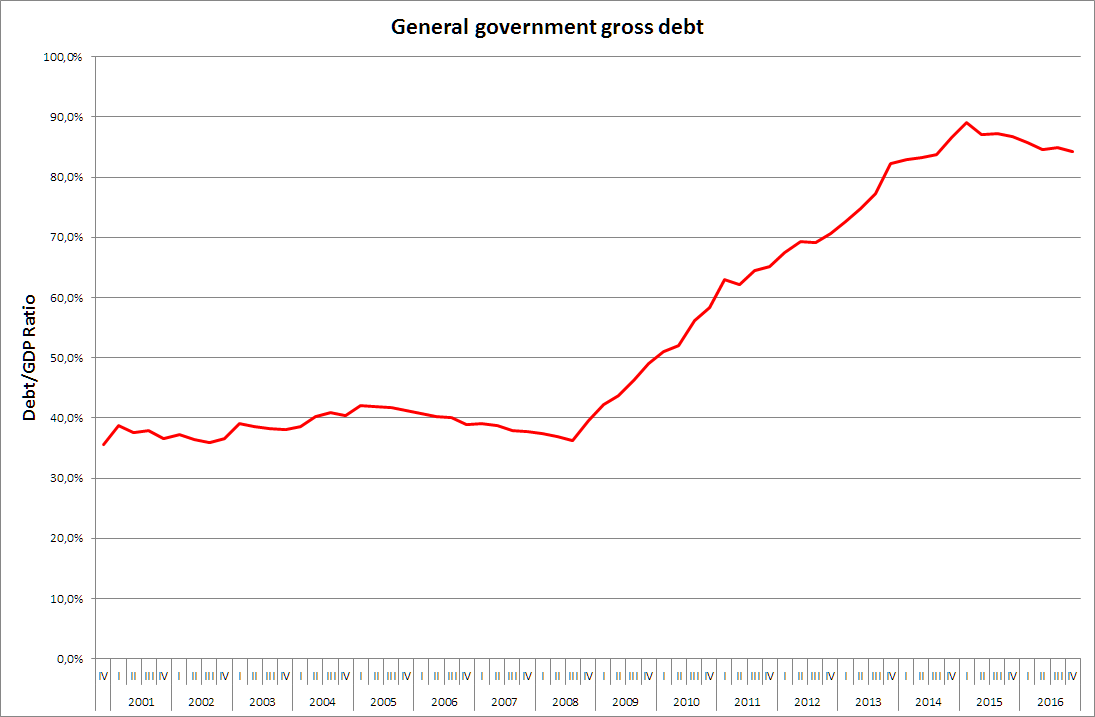
Gross debt from 2000 to 2016

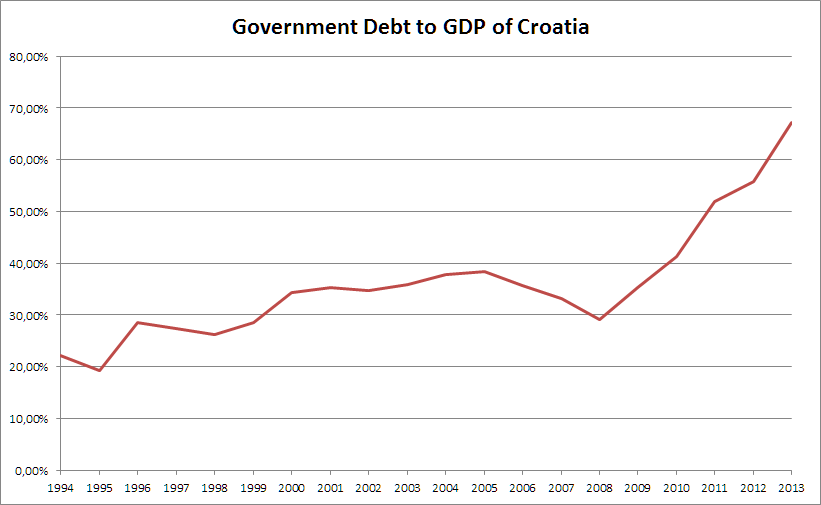
Debt-to-GDP ratio from 1994 to 2013

The breakdown of Croatia's budget for 2023, by ministry (department), is shown below.

- Labor and Pension System, Family and Social Policy – €10.59 billion
- Finance – €7.15 billion
- Health – €4.29 billion
- Science and Education – €3.84 billion
- Economy and Sustainable Development – €2.19 billion
- Maritime Affairs, Transport and Infrastructure – €1.56 billion
- Agriculture – €1.22 billion
- Interior – €1.18 billion
- Defence – €1.17 billion
- Physical Planning, Construction and State Property – €0.74 billion
- Justice and Public Administration – €0.68 billion
- Culture and Media – €0.54 billion
- Regional Development and EU funds – €0.42 billion
- Tourism and Sport – €0.28 billion
- Veteran Affairs – €0.17 billion
- Foreign and European Affairs – €0.15 billion

== Macroeconomic statistics ==
Exports of Croatia by product category (2019) Chemical products Transportation Machines Mineral products Plastics and rubbers Metals Foodstuffs Precious metals Textiles Instruments Animal products Vegetable products Paper goods Footwear and headwear Miscellaneous Stone and glass Wood products Animal and vegetable bi-products Animal hides Arts and antiques Weapons

The following table shows the main economic indicators for the period 2000–2024 according to the Croatian Bureau of Statistics. The purchasing power parity (PPP) conversion factors are based on IMF estimates. Croatian government debt values are published by the Croatian National Bank. Indicators for 2024-2027 are provided by the IMF, specifically the World Economic Outlook (April 2024).

Year	Population (Mil.)	GDP (in Bil. EUR nominal)	GDP (Bil. USD nominal)	GDP-per-capita (nominal. EUR)	GDP-per-capita (nominal, USD)	GDP (Bil., USD PPP)	GDP-per-capita (PPP, USD)	Inflation (%)	GDP growth (real %)	Government debt (% GDP)
2000	4.426	24.0	21.8	5,351	4,929	47.7	10,786	4.6	▲2.9	35.4
2001	4.300	25.8	23.3	6,044	5,414	50.1	11,655	3.8	▲3.0	36.6
2002	4.302	28.3	27.1	6,688	6,293	56.0	12,771	1.7	▲5.7	36.5
2003	4.303	31.2	35.0	7,206	8,130	58.9	13,682	1.8	▲5.5	37.9
2004	4.305	33.6	42.0	7,847	9,752	63.2	14,675	2.1	▲4.1	40.0
2005	4.310	36.2	45.8	8,539	10,620	66.7	15,439	3.3	▲4.3	40.9
2006	4.311	39.4	50.9	9,405	11,795	75.9	17,596	3.2	▲4.9	38.5
2007	4.310	43.2	60.6	10,272	14,043	84.2	19,491	2.9	▲4.9	37.2
2008	4.310	46.5	71.0	11,216	16,419	90.4	20,924	6.1	▲1.9	39.1
2009	4.305	44.4	63.4	10,549	14,663	87.1	20,147	2.4	▼-7.3	48.4
2010	4.295	44.3	60.7	10,615	14,062	86.1	19,965	1.1	▼-1.3	57.3
2011	4.281	45.0	63.4	10,608	14,758	90.3	21,013	2.3	▼-0.1	63.7
2012	4.268	44.5	57.4	10,430	13,400	91.7	21,398	3.4	▼-2.3	69.4
2013	4.256	44.7	59.0	10,423	13,869	94.3	22,135	2.2	▼-0.4	80.3
2014	4.238	44.6	58.4	10,386	13,783	94.8	22,366	-0.2	▼-0.4	83.9
2015	4.204	45.7	50.7	10,755	11,944	98.1	23,339	-0.5	▲2.5	83.3
2016	4.174	47.3	52.4	11,324	12,557	105.4	25,262	-1.1	▲3.6	79.8
2017	4.125	49.5	55.9	12,101	13,657	112.3	27,201	1.1	▲3.4	76.7
2018	4.088	51.9	61.3	12,896	15,245	118.3	28,909	1.5	▲2.8	73.3
2019	4.065	54.8	61.3	13,678	15,333	130.4	30,585	0.8	▲3.4	71.1
2020	4.048	50.5	57.6	12,408	14,205	123.1	28,911	0.1	▼-8.6	87.3
2021	3.879	58.2	68.8	15,006	17,747	143.0	34,533	2.6	▲13.1	78.3
2022	3.857	68.0	71.5	17,637	18,544	155.9	40,573	10.8	▲6.3	70.4
2023	3.856	78.0	84.4	20,239	21,878	186.7	48,586	8.3	▲3.3	83.9
2024	3.866	85.5	92.5	22,111	23,933	190.0	49,137	3.0	▲3.8	57.6
2025f	3.876	93.3	92.3	23,986	24,111	183.2	47,860	3.7	▲3.4	56.3
2026f	3.822	90.5	97.1	23,680	25,391	191.8	50,180	2.2	▲2.7	
2027f	3.816	94.9	101.6	24,877	26,633	200.5	52,563	2.2	▲2.6	

== GDP by county ==
Counties of Croatia by GDP, in million Euro
County	2010	2011	2012	2013	2014	2015	2016	2017	2018
Bjelovar-Bilogora	834	823	786	790	789	809	855	874	925
Brod-Posavina	914	917	895	888	853	879	917	969	1,016
Dubrovnik-Neretva	1,248	1,208	1,202	1,234	1,260	1,313	1,403	1,532	1,587
Istria	2,773	2,762	2,635	2,631	2,666	2,747	2,947	3,106	3,162
Karlovac	969	978	948	961	934	961	1,008	1,031	1,035
Koprivnica-Križevci	935	926	906	919	905	916	961	991	979
Krapina-Zagorje	807	815	803	823	837	867	928	990	1,021
Lika-Senj	416	405	382	388	379	388	402	427	436
Međimurje	933	941	929	1,088	959	986	1,045	1,109	1,142
Osijek-Baranja	2,507	2,514	2,421	2,438	2,375	2,436	2,544	2,581	2,572
Požega-Slavonia	497	482	458	461	433	440	453	466	499
Primorje-Gorski Kotar	3,822	3,905	3,981	3,849	3,849	3,854	3,961	4,177	4,270
Sisak-Moslavina	1,451	1,439	1,434	1,306	1,221	1,268	1,247	1,266	1,309
Split-Dalmatia	3,788	3,695	3,578	3,583	3,581	3,712	3,913	4,133	4,278
Šibenik-Knin	859	856	835	851	852	862	903	988	1,027
Varaždin	1,463	1,456	1,436	1,467	1,462	1,506	1,601	1,718	1,865
Virovitica-Podravina	516	526	504	496	455	460	485	500	536
Vukovar-Syrmia	1,090	1,092	1,049	1,048	999	1,031	1,076	1,120	1,171
Zadar	1,405	1,383	1,366	1,386	1,395	1,445	1,527	1,671	1,797
Zagreb County	2,398	2,449	2,439	2,450	2,466	2,549	2,651	2,832	3,011
City of Zagreb	15,586	15,383	15,055	14,778	14,754	15,206	15,818	16,782	17,544
Source: Croatian Bureau of Statistics

Counties of Croatia by GDP-per-capita, in Euro
County	2010	2011	2012	2013	2014	2015	2016	2017	2018
Bjelovar-Bilogora	6,907	6,888	6,657	6,766	6,829	7,107	7,647	7,958	7,986
Brod-Posavina	5,731	5,789	5,691	5,700	5,539	5,810	6,195	6,726	6,607
Dubrovnik-Neretva	10,174	9,855	9,812	10,083	10,297	10,737	11,500	12,608	13,277
Istria	13,297	13,270	12,684	12,665	12,811	13,199	14,165	14,915	15,570
Karlovac	7,458	7,615	7,461	7,651	7,541	7,868	8,373	8,701	8,301
Koprivnica-Križevci	8,052	8,020	7,890	8,039	7,969	8,149	8,660	9,066	8,711
Krapina-Zagorje	6,049	6,142	6,091	6,287	6,439	6,721	7,265	7,830	7,919
Lika-Senj	8,091	7,984	7,652	7,874	7,812	8,134	8,571	9,297	8,878
Međimurje	8,196	8,273	8,176	9,592	8,480	8,751	9,328	9,989	10,302
Osijek-Baranja	8,183	8,249	7,990	8,105	7,965	8,270	8,779	9,098	8,684
Požega-Slavonia	6,314	6,194	5,971	6,081	5,774	5,973	6,307	6,681	6,620
Primorje-Gorski Kotar	12,873	13,185	13,474	13,061	13,103	13,204	13,686	14,559	14,797
Sisak-Moslavina	8,321	8,372	8,465	7,832	7,459	7,899	7,939	8,284	7,868
Split-Dalmatia	8,323	8,121	7,866	7,876	7,876	8,184	8,655	9,183	9,636
Šibenik-Knin	7,788	7,855	7,764	7,998	8,086	8,267	8,776	9,737	9,713
Varaždin	8,298	8,281	8,193	8,412	8,434	8,752	9,389	10,176	10,899
Virovitica-Podravina	6,037	6,213	6,012	5,979	5,542	5,704	6,135	6,480	6,525
Vukovar-Syrmia	6,016	6,094	5,856	5,961	5,772	6,082	6,498	6,999	6,730
Zadar	8,281	8,114	7,985	8,084	8,146	8,478	9,003	9,901	10,803
Zagreb County	7,565	7,703	7,660	7,687	7,748	8,050	8,434	9,083	9,710
City of Zagreb	19,765	19,453	18,986	18,578	18,479	18,992	19,711	20,879	22,695
Source: Croatian Bureau of Statistics

== See also ==
- Economy of Europe
- Croatia and the euro
- Croatian brands
