= List of Croatian counties by GDP =

Comparison of the gross domestic product of Croatian counties

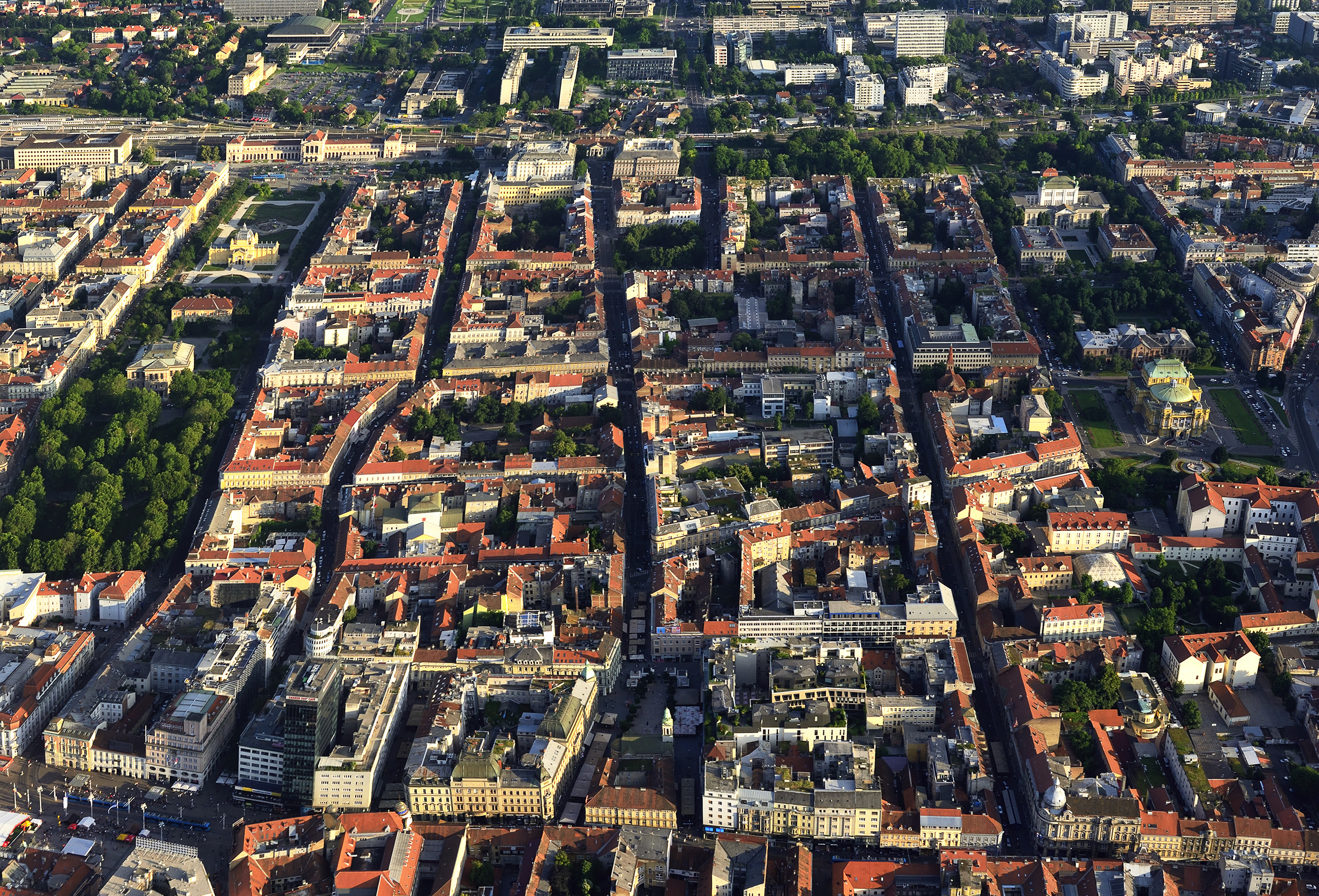
The capital city-county of Zagreb is the nation's primary economic and financial centre.

Across the Croatian economy's total economic output (GDP), the nation's twenty counties contribute varied levels of activity. This list of Croatian counties by GDP reflect historic infrastructure development, transportation routes, and geographic setting various parts of the country. Certain economic sectors and industries are concentrated among select regions in Croatia. The city-county of Zagreb, the capital of Croatia, maintains the highest GDP of all counties, followed by coastal counties where tourism is common. The economic output of these counties are measured in nominal and purchasing power (PPS or PPP) terms.

== Economic growth ==
The Croatian economy is significantly centralized, as the bulk of its GDP (31.4%) is generated within the nation's capital and the most populous city—Zagreb. The city administered area covers 1.1% of territory, and encompasses 18.4% of Croatia's population. Zagreb's GDP amounts to €14 billion, surpassing the second ranked county in terms of GDP—Split-Dalmatia County—by more than €10 billion. The Split-Dalmatia is closely followed by Primorje-Gorski Kotar County, the two counties centering on the second and third largest cities in Croatia—Split and Rijeka—and benefiting from considerable trade, processing industry, and tourism.

The two counties contribute 8.6% and 8.4% of Croatia's GDP respectively. Three following counties, ranked by the GDP, are Istria, Osijek-Baranja and Zagreb counties—the latter encompassing territory surrounding the capital. The lowest GDP is achieved by Lika-Senj, Požega-Slavonia and Virovitica-Podravina counties. The low figures, ranging from €435 to €561 million are consequence of not only low level of economic development, but also of low populations of the counties.

All the counties recorded steady growth of their GDP until 2008, when the values peaked. Between 2000 and 2008 Croatian GDP grew by 105%, but growth of economy in the individual counties was not uniform—the growth in the period ranged from 60% recorded in the Sisak-Moslavina County to as much as 154% in the Zadar County. The greatest growth rate in the period, besides the Zadar County, was achieved by Dubrovnik-Neretva (135%) and Šibenik-Knin counties as well as the city of Zagreb (120%). In 2009, Croatian GDP fell by 5.5%, with similarly uneven variation of the county GDP figures. The largest drops were recorded in Virovitica-Podravina (−15.1%), Lika-Senj (−11.6%), Šibenik-Knin (−11.4%) and Krapina-Zagorje (−11.3%) counties. The lowest rate of economic decline was observed in Istria (−2.5%), Zagreb (−2.6%) and Sisak-Moslavina (−2.6%) counties.

== Counties by GDP (PPS) per capita ==
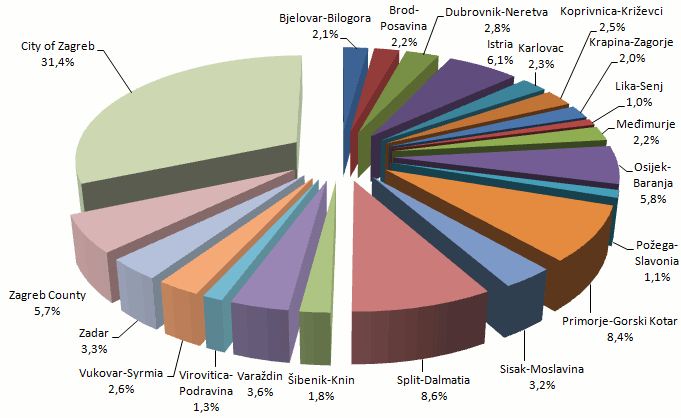
The share of individual county GDPs in Croatia's total GDP, 2009.

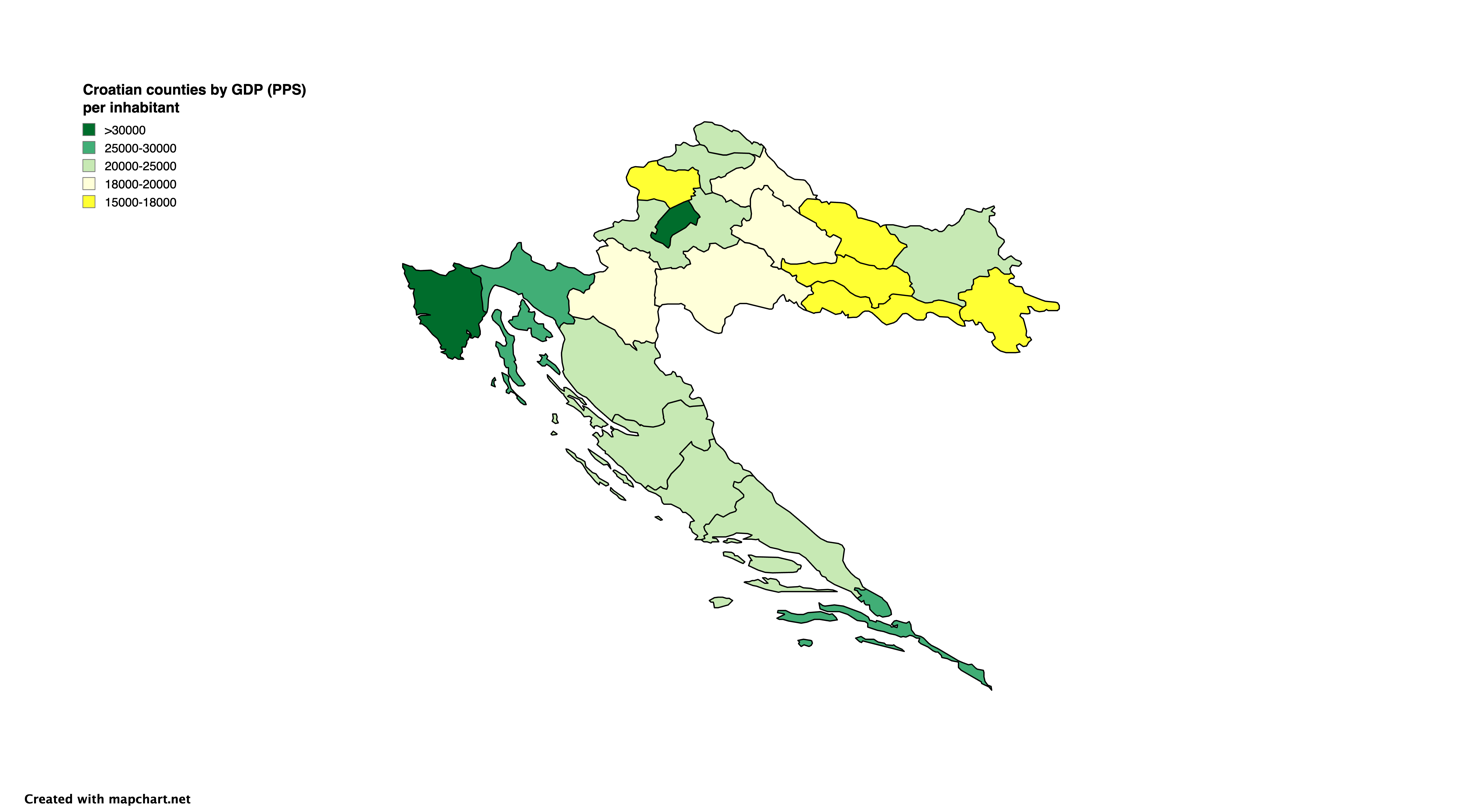
Croatian counties by GDP (PPS) per capita, 2022

Rank	County	2024 (in EUR)	2024 (in percentage of EU average)
1	City of Zagreb	52,500	131
2	Primorje-Gorski Kotar	35,200	88
3	Istria	34,800	87
-	Croatia	31,100	78
4	Dubrovnik-Neretva	30,700	77
5	Zagreb County	27,200	68
6	Varaždin	26,300	66
7	Lika-Senj	26,300	66
8	Koprivnica-Križevci	25,500	64
9	Split-Dalmatia	25,400	64
10	Zadar	25,300	63
11	Međimurje	25,200	63
12	Šibenik-Knin	24,000	60
13	Sisak-Moslavina	23,500	59
14	Osijek-Baranja	23,200	58
15	Karlovac	22,800	57
16	Bjelovar-Bilogora	20,900	52
17	Krapina-Zagorje	19,900	50
18	Brod-Posavina	19,700	49
19	Vukovar-Syrmia	18,900	47
20	Virovitica-Podravina	16,900	42
21	Požega-Slavonia	16,800	42

== Counties by nominal GDP ==
Counties of Croatia by GDP, in million Euro
County	2000	2001	2002	2003	2004	2005	2006	2007	2008	2009	2010	2011	2012	2013	2014	2015	2016	2017	2018	2019
Bjelovar-Bilogora	520	569	639	645	688	698	800	804	953	917	834	823	786	790	789	809	855	874	925	971
Brod-Posavina	564	628	687	713	779	771	849	918	1,032	952	914	917	895	888	853	879	917	969	1,016	1,130
Dubrovnik-Neretva	573	630	676	754	883	977	1,083	1,292	1,340	1,267	1,248	1,208	1,202	1,234	1,260	1,313	1,403	1,532	1,587	1,789
Istria	1,420	1,614	1,814	1,980	2,182	2,291	2,482	2,729	2,842	2,768	2,773	2,762	2,635	2,631	2,666	2,747	2,947	3,106	3,162	3,343
Karlovac	586	713	785	758	777	835	943	1,048	1,107	998	969	978	948	961	934	961	1,008	1,031	1,035	1,098
Koprivnica-Križevci	723	762	830	845	853	855	988	1,046	1,069	998	935	926	906	919	905	916	961	991	979	1,076
Krapina-Zagorje	569	655	681	706	729	815	858	947	974	868	807	815	803	823	837	867	928	990	1,021	1,116
Lika-Senj	235	250	309	384	522	407	429	417	491	445	416	405	382	388	379	388	402	427	436	478
Međimurje	510	562	644	654	691	737	841	892	1,034	977	933	941	929	1,088	959	986	1,045	1,109	1,142	1,255
Osijek-Baranja	1,352	1,459	1,668	1,700	1,872	2,043	2,249	2,600	2,834	2,642	2,507	2,514	2,421	2,438	2,375	2,436	2,544	2,581	2,572	2,793
Požega-Slavonia	325	355	380	420	451	464	478	508	554	504	497	482	458	461	433	440	453	466	499	545
Primorje-Gorski Kotar	2,111	2,138	2,261	2,543	2,685	3,066	3,371	3,560	4,060	3,820	3,822	3,905	3,981	3,849	3,849	3,854	3,961	4,177	4,270	4,306
Sisak-Moslavina	925	938	972	989	1,033	1,137	1,335	1,262	1,435	1,447	1,451	1,439	1,434	1,306	1,221	1,268	1,247	1,266	1,309	1,416
Split-Dalmatia	1,924	2,118	2,318	2,529	2,898	3,061	3,427	3,934	4,115	3,804	3,788	3,695	3,578	3,583	3,581	3,712	3,913	4,133	4,278	4,819
Šibenik-Knin	423	450	511	581	659	748	765	902	923	802	859	856	835	851	852	862	903	988	1,027	1,124
Varaždin	894	996	1,139	1,175	1,166	1,229	1,347	1,451	1,637	1,549	1,463	1,456	1,436	1,467	1,462	1,506	1,601	1,718	1,865	2,014
Virovitica-Podravina	357	406	438	458	471	476	555	590	615	546	516	526	504	496	455	460	485	500	536	580
Vukovar-Syrmia	624	686	762	816	864	928	1,079	1,109	1,260	1,171	1,090	1,092	1,049	1,048	999	1,031	1,076	1,120	1,171	1,299
Zadar	627	733	829	982	1,055	1,166	1,238	1,443	1,618	1,478	1,405	1,383	1,366	1,386	1,395	1,445	1,527	1,671	1,797	1,940
Zagreb County	1,284	1,272	1,583	1,653	1,823	2,059	2,128	2,419	2,653	2,555	2,398	2,449	2,439	2,450	2,466	2,549	2,651	2,832	3,011	3,333
City of Zagreb	6,912	7,806	8,569	9,458	10,400	11,717	12,954	14,059	15,439	14,561	15,586	15,383	15,055	14,778	14,754	15,206	15,818	16,782	17,544	19,178
Source: Croatian Bureau of Statistics

== Counties by nominal GDP per capita ==
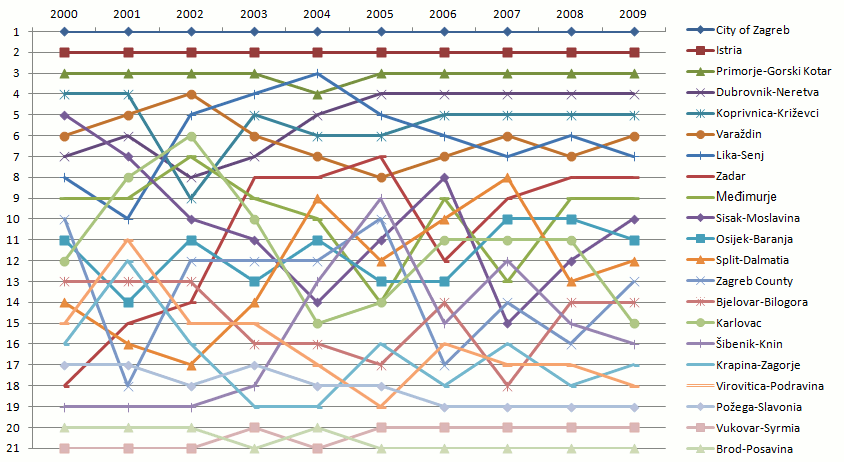
The ranking of individual county GDP per capita within Croatia, 2000–2009.

The highest nominal GDP per capita is recorded in the City of Zagreb at €22,695 in 2018. The second, third and fourth ranked counties in terms of the GDP per capita are Istria, Primorje-Gorski Kotar and Dubrovnik-Neretva, at €15,570, €14,797 and €13,277, respectively. The four are the only counties of Croatia enjoying GDP per capita exceeding national average of €12,270. The lowest GDP per capita is recorded in the Virovitica-Podravina (€6,525), Brod-Posavina (€6,607) and Požega-Slavonia (€6,620) counties.

The city of Zagreb ranks first among in terms of the GDP per capita continuously since 2000. The Istria County or the Primorje-Gorski Kotar County rank the second and third throughout the period except in 2004, when the Lika-Senj County takes third place. The largest net change of the ranking was achieved by the Šibenik-Knin County, improving its ranking by 11 places since 2000 when its GDP per capita was the 19th largest in Croatia. The Brod-Posavina, Požega-Slavonia, Virovitica-Podravina and Vukovar-Syrmia counties occupy the last four rankings continuously since 2000.

Counties of Croatia by GDP per capita, in Euro
County	2000	2001	2002	2003	2004	2005	2006	2007	2008	2009	2010	2011	2012	2013	2014	2015	2016	2017	2018	2019
Bjelovar-Bilogora	4,007	4,383	4,951	5,042	5,417	5,539	6,395	6,489	7,756	7,522	6,907	6,888	6,657	6,766	6,829	7,107	7,647	7,958	7,986	9,132
Brod-Posavina	3,425	3,812	4,171	4,345	4,766	4,731	5,223	5,660	6,384	5,921	5,731	5,789	5,691	5,700	5,539	5,810	6,195	6,726	6,607	8,211
Dubrovnik-Neretva	4,886	5,373	5,738	6,378	7,442	8,197	9,025	10,698	11,024	10,351	10,174	9,855	9,812	10,083	10,297	10,737	11,500	12,608	13,277	14,673
Istria	7,184	8,160	9,117	9,880	10,813	11,267	12,116	13,221	13,691	13,285	13,297	13,270	12,684	12,665	12,811	13,199	14,165	14,915	15,570	15,960
Karlovac	4,181	5,082	5,635	5,491	5,666	6,139	6,989	7,830	8,341	7,598	7,458	7,615	7,461	7,651	7,541	7,868	8,373	8,701	8,301	9,510
Koprivnica-Križevci	5,955	6,269	6,858	7,025	7,134	7,181	8,335	8,878	9,108	8,545	8,052	8,020	7,890	8,039	7,969	8,149	8,660	9,066	8,711	10,110
Krapina-Zagorje	4,089	4,702	4,919	5,129	5,323	5,972	6,313	7,008	7,250	6,479	6,049	6,142	6,091	6,287	6,439	6,721	7,265	7,830	7,919	8,954
Lika-Senj	4,219	4,493	5,582	6,965	9,466	7,446	7,927	7,783	9,277	8,515	8,091	7,984	7,652	7,874	7,812	8,134	8,571	9,297	8,878	10,725
Međimurje	4,472	4,930	5,644	5,729	6,056	6,459	7,375	7,830	9,086	8,583	8,196	8,273	8,176	9,592	8,480	8,751	9,328	9,989	10,302	11,476
Osijek-Baranja	4,247	4,582	5,239	5,354	5,914	6,480	7,174	8,353	9,162	8,578	8,183	8,249	7,990	8,105	7,965	8,270	8,779	9,098	8,684	10,232
Požega-Slavonia	3,904	4,255	4,572	5,066	5,479	5,658	5,874	6,286	6,897	6,330	6,314	6,194	5,971	6,081	5,774	5,973	6,307	6,681	6,620	8,217
Primorje-Gorski Kotar	7,123	7,210	7,622	8,575	9,051	10,326	11,337	11,959	13,642	12,847	12,873	13,185	13,474	13,061	13,103	13,204	13,686	14,559	14,797	15,232
Sisak-Moslavina	4,884	4,952	5,158	5,285	5,552	6,156	7,292	6,966	8,018	8,184	8,321	8,372	8,465	7,832	7,459	7,899	7,939	8,284	7,868	9,706
Split-Dalmatia	4,422	4,866	5,278	5,723	6,508	6,820	7,593	8,684	9,059	8,361	8,323	8,121	7,866	7,876	7,876	8,184	8,655	9,183	9,636	10,759
Šibenik-Knin	3,855	4,094	4,631	5,254	5,946	6,733	6,863	8,081	8,262	7,202	7,788	7,855	7,764	7,998	8,086	8,267	8,776	9,737	9,713	11,325
Varaždin	4,952	5,516	6,327	6,550	6,525	6,890	7,564	8,165	9,233	8,758	8,298	8,281	8,193	8,412	8,434	8,752	9,389	10,176	10,899	12,112
Virovitica-Podravina	3,887	4,416	4,793	5,029	5,222	5,329	6,253	6,703	7,048	6,326	6,037	6,213	6,012	5,979	5,542	5,704	6,135	6,480	6,525	7,869
Vukovar-Syrmia	3,277	3,604	4,018	4,330	4,617	4,985	5,825	6,012	6,853	6,401	6,016	6,094	5,856	5,961	5,772	6,082	6,498	6,999	6,730	8,606
Zadar	4,050	4,726	5,289	6,193	6,579	7,186	7,534	8,676	9,640	8,752	8,281	8,114	7,985	8,084	8,146	8,478	9,003	9,901	10,803	11,544
Zagreb County	4,327	4,283	5,279	5,459	5,966	6,686	6,859	7,745	8,443	8,089	7,565	7,703	7,660	7,687	7,748	8,050	8,434	9,083	9,710	10,769
City of Zagreb	8,962	10,114	11,091	12,238	13,418	15,082	16,642	18,005	19,709	18,526	19,765	19,453	18,986	18,578	18,479	18,992	19,711	20,879	22,695	23,742

== See also ==
- Economy of Croatia
- List of European Union regions by GDP
