= Serbs of Zagreb =

Traditional ethnic minority community in Zagreb, Croatia

The Serbs of Zagreb or Zagreb Serbs, are a traditional ethnic community living in Zagreb, capital and the largest city of Croatia.

== History ==
In 1718, the Treaty of Passarowitz opened the Danube river and the Adriatic Sea for international trade with Austrian Empire granting privileges to Ottoman traders including the right for "Greek" merchants to settle in Trieste, Rijeka, Vienna, and Zagreb. The 1781 edict of Emperor Joseph II, the Patent of Toleration, accorded Serbs of Zagreb the status of equal citizens.

Numerous prominent Serbs played an active role in the civic and cultural life of Zagreb, including the following notable figures. In 1834, Hristifor Stanković, president of the Zagreb Orthodox church municipality, built the first theater in Gradec. Poet Petar Preradović was a prominent participant of the Illyrian movement after whom today one of the city squares is named. Banker Atanas Popović was one of the founders of First Croatian Savings Bank. Bogdan Medaković was the Speaker of the Croatian Parliament from 1913 till 1918.

Established in 1895, the Serbian Bank functioned as a mid-sized bank within the Kingdom of Hungary and subsequently the Kingdom of Yugoslavia, before being wound up in 1945. Contemporary sources and historians have described it as "the financial center of the Serbian irredentist movement".

== Demographics ==
According to data from the 2021 census, the number of ethnic Serbs in Zagreb stood at 12,034, constituting 1.6% of city's population.

== Organizations ==
Zagreb is the seat of the Metropolitanate of Zagreb and Ljubljana of the Serbian Orthodox Church with Cathedral of the Transfiguration of the Lord serving as its cathedral church.

There are several organizations and bodies of ethnic Serb minority that are headquartered in Zagreb: Serb National Council (body of self-government of the Serbs of Croatia in matters regarding civil rights and cultural identity), Prosvjeta (with the Central Library of Serbs in Croatia as its part), Archives of Serbs in Croatia, and Serbian Orthodox Secondary School, as well as several NGOs such as Serb Democratic Forum and Privrednik.

Weekly magazine Novosti, published by the Serb National Council, is also based in Zagreb.

== Gallery ==
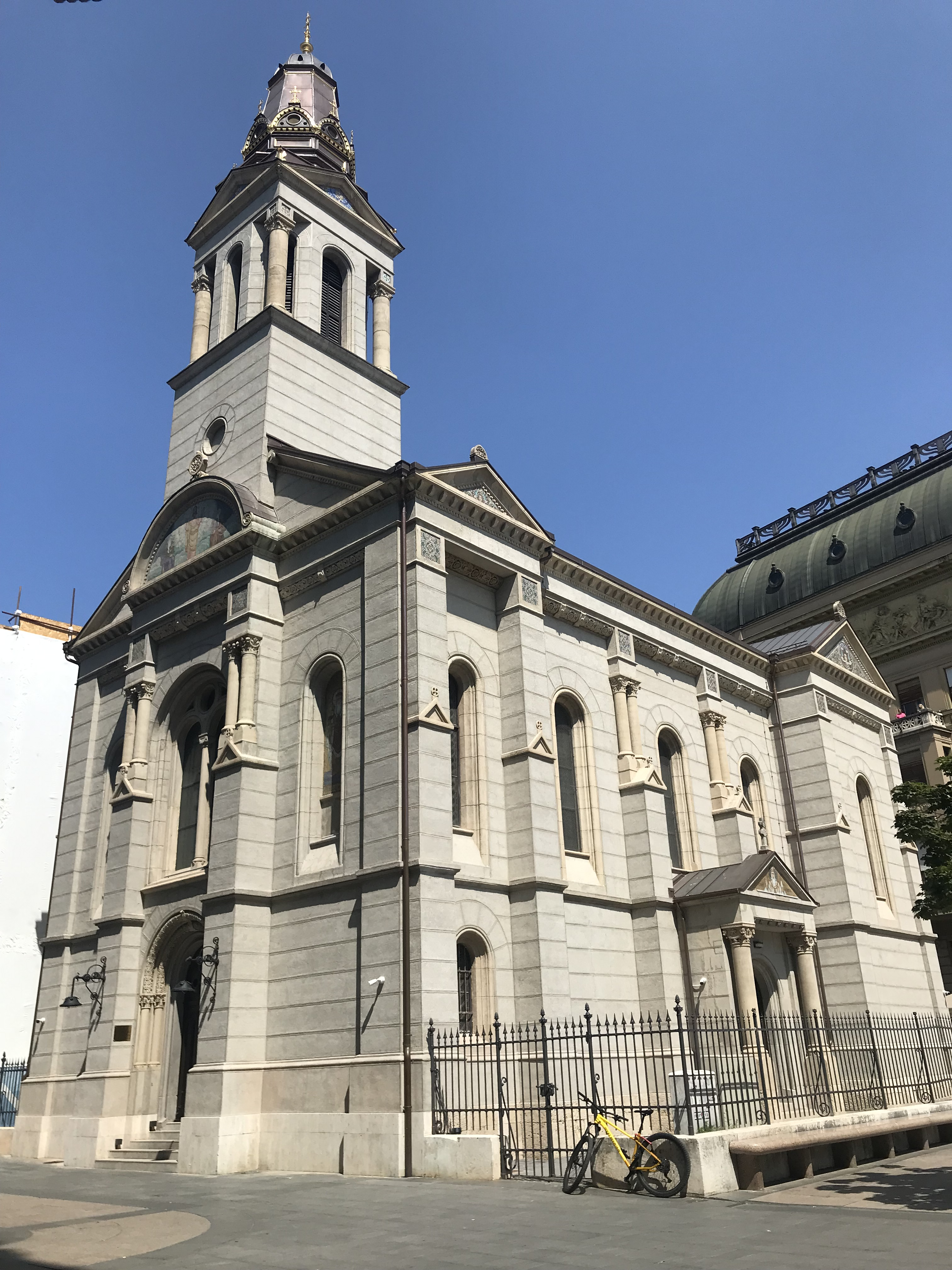
Cathedral of the Transfiguration of the Lord

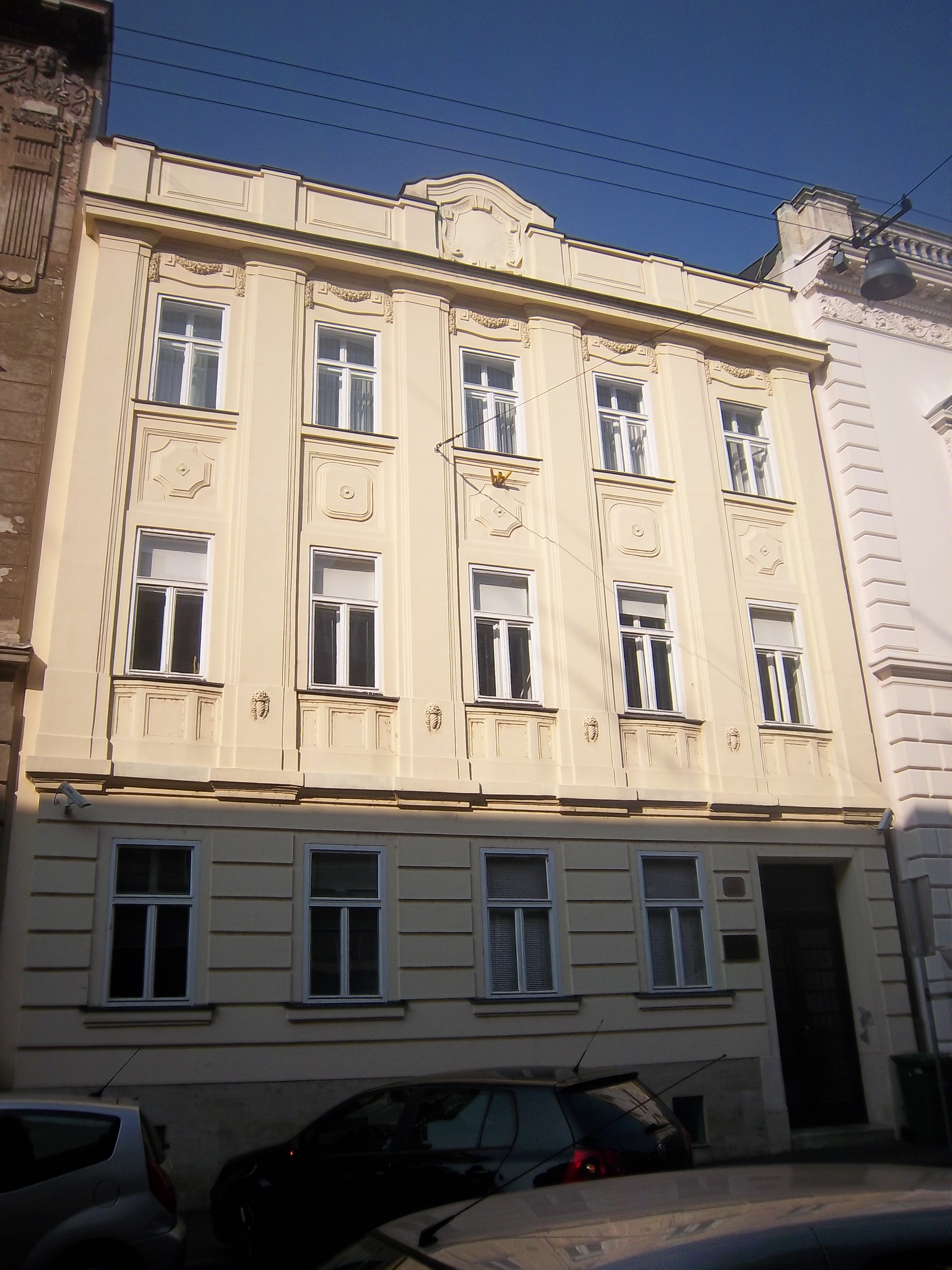
Headquarters of SKD Prosvjeta

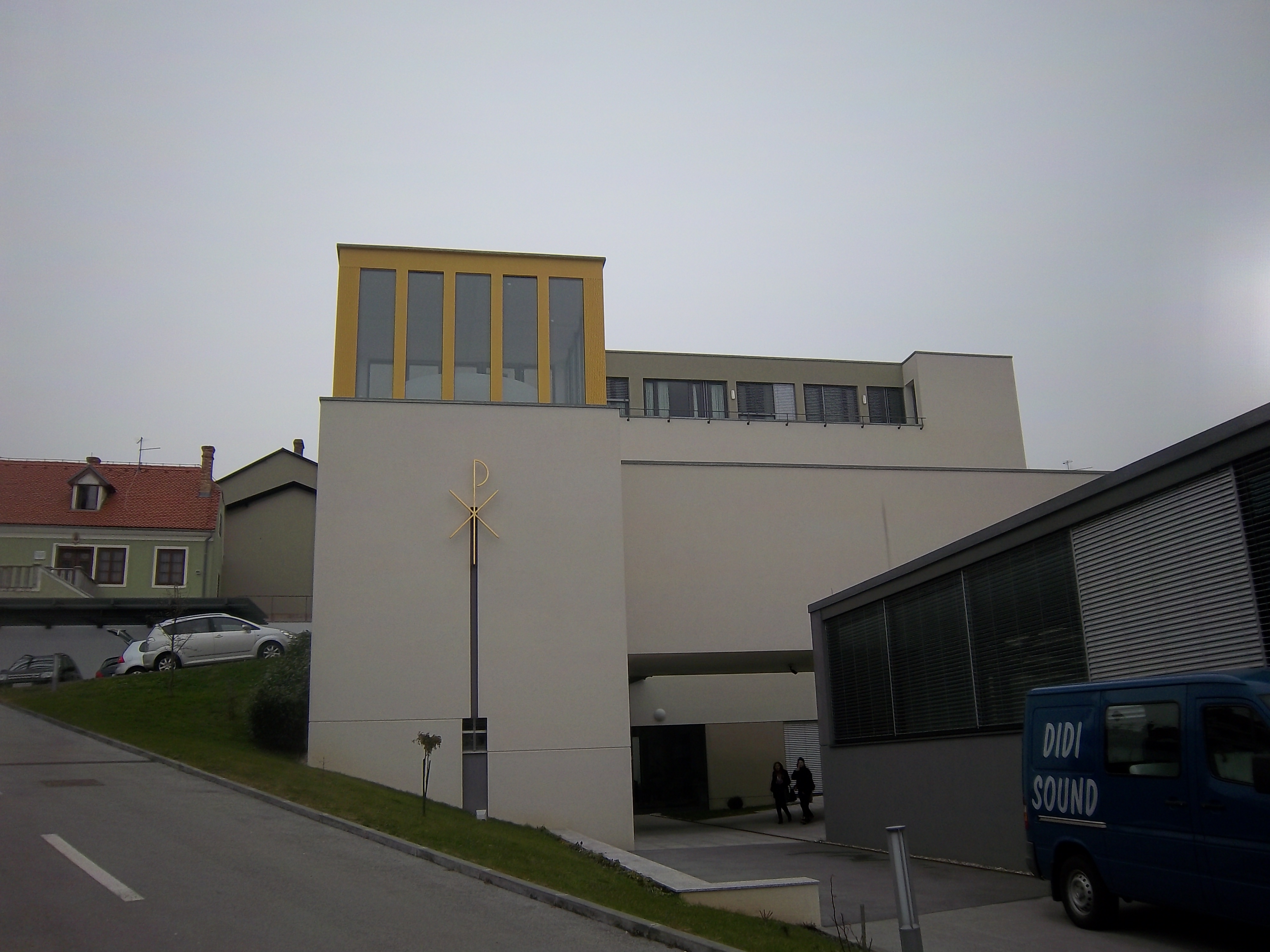
Kantakuzina Katarina Branković Serbian Orthodox Secondary School

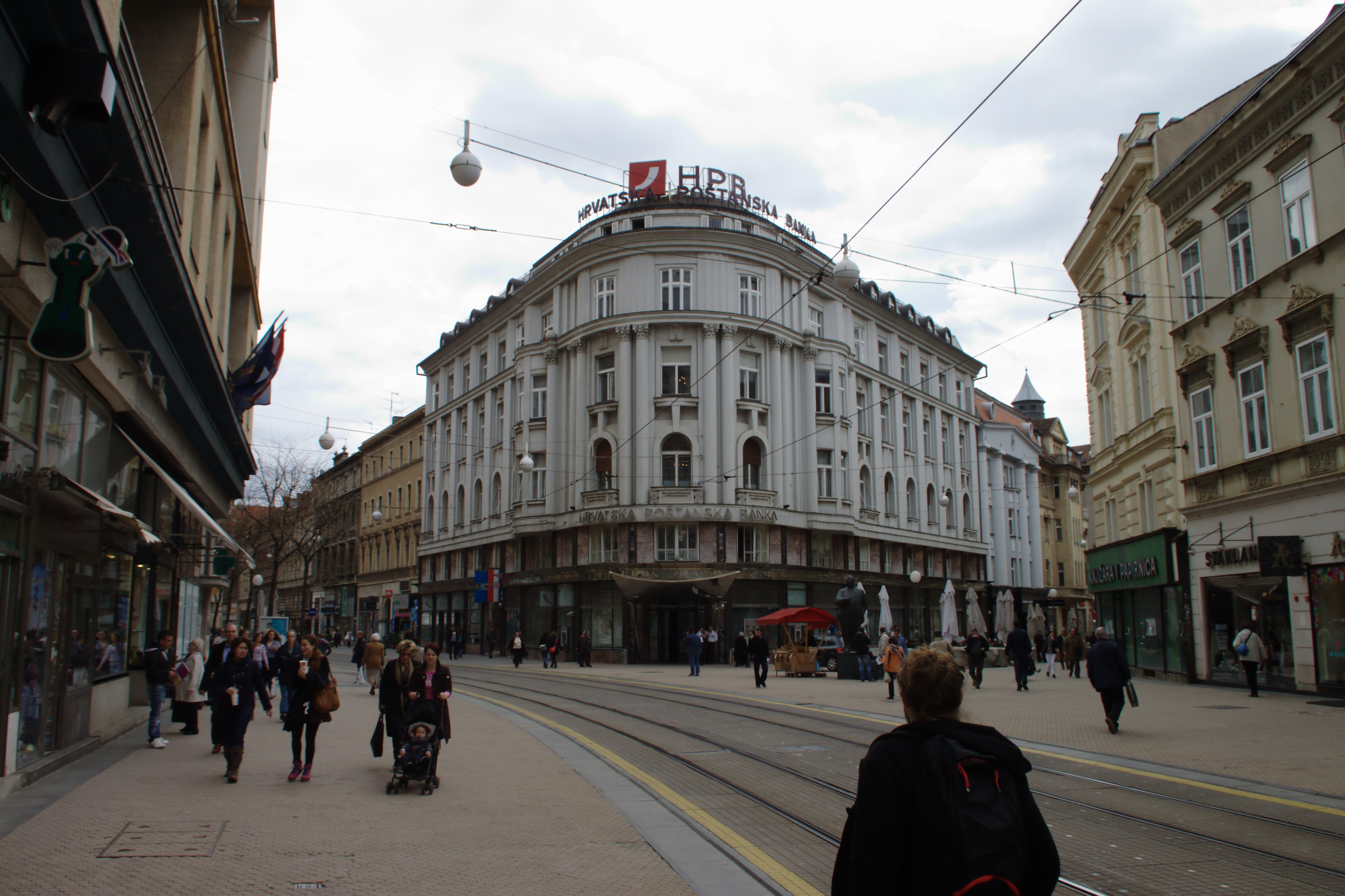
Former headquarters of the Serbian Bank, nowadays headquarters of Hrvatska poštanska banka

== Notable people ==
- Lazar Bačić – merchant and philanthropist
- Katarina Branković – medieval scribe and Countess of Celje
- Slavko Ćuruvija – journalist
- Vladan Desnica – writer
- Jovan Karamata – matematician and writer
- Dejan Medaković – art historian
- Stefan Vrabčević – mayor of Zagreb

== See also ==
- Serbs of Croatia
- Serbs of Vukovar
- Metropolitanate of Zagreb and Ljubljana
