= Paulina Matijević =

Serbian philanthropist

Paulina Matijević (Serbian Cyrillic: Паулина Матијевић; 1861 - 1926) was a Serbian philanthropist.

Paulina Lađević was born in Karlovac, at the time in the Kingdom of Croatia-Slavonia, Austrian Empire. She married Vladimir Matijević in 1883. Matijević was one of the founders of the so-called The Krajina Society, a society of Serbian ladies who collected small charitable contributions every day, from which the first Serbian school in Zagreb emerged. With her initiative, the Women's Charitable Cooperative Srpkinja was founded in Zagreb, from which the Serbian Girls' Boarding School also emerged, whose task was to educate young women.

Matijević was a member of the Privrednik Patronage. At the end of 1904, Privrednik expanded its activities to care for female children, thanks to the efforts of Matijević. She left all her property, 4,000 shares of the Serbian Bank in Zagreb, to Privrednik for the ongoing rise and advancement of poor Serbian youth. She died in Paris, France.
