= Bogdan Medaković =

Croatian Serb lawyer and politician in Austria-Hungary (1854–1938)

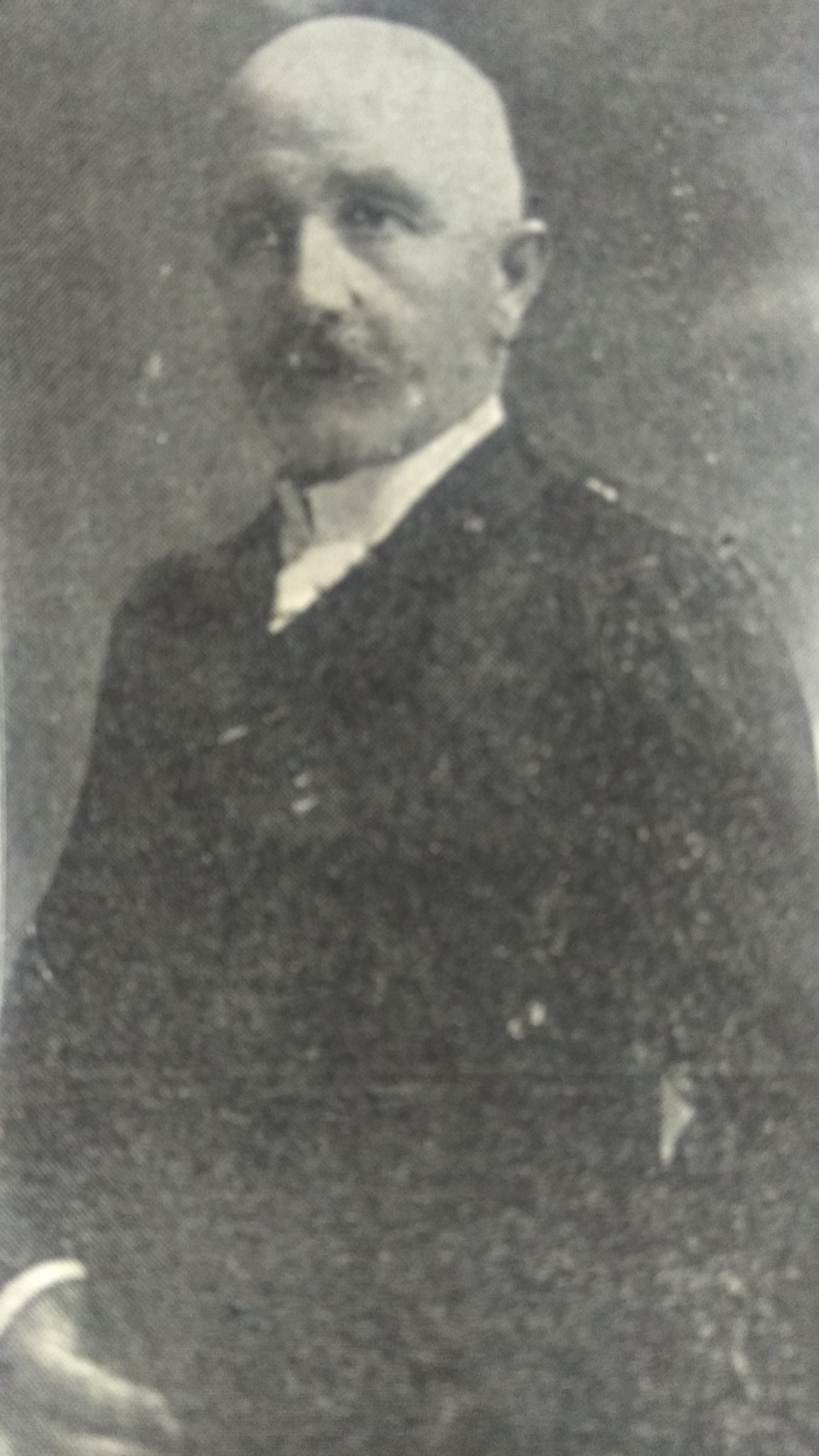
- Born: 11 April 1854
- Died: 11 May 1930
- Occupations: Lawyer, politician, jurist

Bogdan Medaković (11 April 1854 - 11 May 1930) was a Croatian Serb lawyer and politician who was one of the most prominent politicians at the turn of the 20th century in Croatia under Austria-Hungary. He served as the president of the Croatian Parliament three times in the period between 1906 and 1918.

== Biography ==
Bogdan Medaković was born in Novi Sad on 11 April 1854, as the son of Danilo Medaković. He attended the University of Vienna and obtained the title of Doctor of Laws at the age of only 21. He worked for some time in the court in Sremska Mitrovica, and in 1879 he opened an independent law office in Zagreb. Medaković came to be known as one of the wealthiest people in Zagreb at the time.

He began his political career in 1883 when he first entered the Croatian Parliament as a representative of the Srb district, newly established as the Military Frontier was integrated with the Kingdom of Croatia-Slavonia. In Parliament, he was engaged in the newly established Serbian Independent Club, as its secretary.

He was one of the founders of the Serbian Bank in Zagreb in 1895.

Between 1896 and 1909 he headed the Serbian Orthodox Community of Zagreb. He was elected a deputy at the Serbian National-Church Assembly in Sremski Karlovci.

Bogdan Medaković was also distinguished himself as a follower of Matijević's idea of creating "Privrednik". 1897, and his activities on the founding of the newspaper "Srpsko kolo", which was published in Zagreb until 1903, were also noticed.

Medaković advocated for harmony and a political alliance between the Serbs and the Croats in the Austro-Hungarian monarchy. As the leader of the Serb Independent Party, Bogdan Medaković actively participated in the adoption of the Rijeka Resolution and the Zadar Resolution, which resulted in the creation of the Croat-Serb Coalition in 1905. Together with Svetozar Pribićević and Dušan Popović he was one of the most prominent Serb members of the Coalition.

Medaković was first elected president (speaker) of the Croatian Parliament in 1906 and remained in that position until 1908. He was re-elected in the 1908 Croatian parliamentary election, but the Emperor issued a rescript by which the meeting of the Parliament was postponed.

As a prominent Zagreb lawyer, in 1909 he participated in the defence of "traitors" in Agram Trial, a show trial against 53 Serbs before the Zagreb court table. He was also involved in the defence at Vienna's "treasonous trial" against Heinrich Friedjung, the Austrian historian and journalist.

The Parliament reconvened in March 1910, when Medaković was again elected Speaker, though that session came to a close in August the same year. He was then again re-elected, but the Coalition lost to the party of ban Tomašić. In the December 1911 election, he was elected again, but the Emperor dissolved the Parliament as early as January 1912. Finally, at the December 1913 election, Medaković was elected speaker, and served until the start of World War I.

As a member of the Croatian Parliament, he was also elected a member in the Hungarian Parliament, in 1906 to the Lower House, and in 1913 to the Magnate House.

The work of the Parliament was interrupted several times after July 1914, and Medaković was actually arrested and detained by the military authorities under suspicion of collaboration with Serbia. His position was tenuous throughout the war, and he only participated in the Parliament briefly in 1916.

As the President of the Parliament in the final October 1918 session, he declared the severance of state-legal ties with the Hungarian and Austrian empires. This opened the way to the creation of the National Council of Slovenes, Croats and Serbs, of which he was a member.

Medaković was a determined fighter in the fight for the preservation of church-school autonomy, for freedom of speech and for the parliamentary system in then Croatia. He advocated a joint struggle with the Croats for Yugoslavia.

After the creation of the Kingdom of Serbs, Croats and Slovenes, Bogdan Medaković withdrew from politics.

In Zagreb, he built one of the most beautiful residential palaces on Zrinjevac 15, which was originally almost the same as the Adam House in Budapest (Bródy Sándor Street No. 4).

He died in Vienna.

His grandson was academician Dejan Medaković, and he was born in 1922 at Zrinjevac 15.

== See also ==
- Ljubomir Davidović

== Sources ==
- Batušić, Slavko (2003). "Medaković, Bogdan (1854-1930), Rechtsanwalt und Politiker". Österreichisches Biographisches Lexikon und biographische Dokumentation (in German). ISBN 978-3-7001-3213-4.
- Matković, Stjepan (28 December 2025). "Koliko je dugo Bogdan Medaković bio predsjednik Hrvatskoga sabora?". CroFacta (in Croatian). Miroslav Krleža Institute of Lexicography.
