= Adriatic-Danubian Bank =

Former bank in Yugoslavia

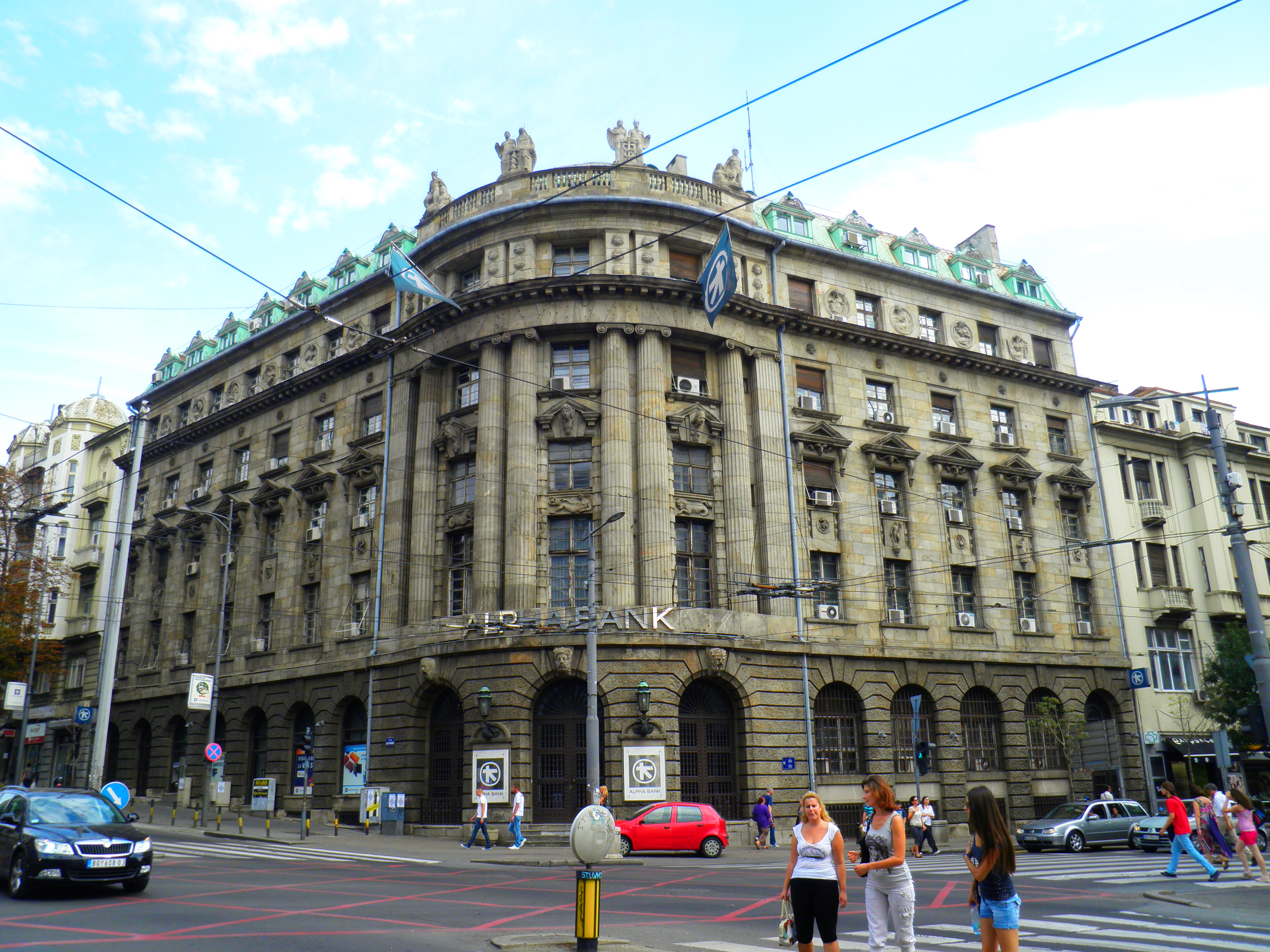
Former head office of the Adriatic-Danubian Bank in Belgrade, designed in 1921 by architect August Rheinfels for the Adriatic Bank and completed in 1924

The Adriatic-Danubian Bank (Croatian: Jadransko-podunavska banka) was a significant commercial bank in the interwar Kingdom of Yugoslavia. At the time of the merger that formed it in 1924, it was the third-largest commercial bank in the country. It was liquidated in 1945, ahead of the rest of the Yugoslav commercial banking sector.

== Background ==
The Adriatic Bank (Croatian: Jadranska banka) was founded in 1905 by a group of Slovene, Croatian and Serb individuals in Trieste, which at the time was part of Austria-Hungary. It soon developed a network of branches on the Dalmatian coast and dominated the region's banking market. In 1911–1913, it acquired the Croatian Credit Bank (Croatian: Hrvatska vjeresijska banka, Italian: Banca Croata di Credito in Ragusa, est. 1902) in Dubrovnik, and also took over the Commercial Bank (Croatian: Trgovačka obrtna banka) in Ljubljana.

Separately, the Danubian Joint-Stock Company (Serbian: Podunavsko - Trgovačko Akcionarsko Društvo) was established in Belgrade in 1910 by the Serbian Bank in Zagreb as its affiliate in the Kingdom of Serbia.

Following World War I, the Adriatic Bank's head office in Trieste and operations in Fiume, Abbazia, and Zara, as well as its branch in Vienna where it had relocated head office functions during the war, became an Italian bank (Italian: Banca Adriatica), which eventually failed in 1924. The bank's operations in the newly formed Kingdom of Serbs, Croats and Slovenes, initially managed from Ljubljana, were reorganized in 1921 by the same shareholders as Jadranska Banka a.d., headquartered in Belgrade.

== Merger and aftermath ==
On 11 May 1924, the Belgrade-based Adriatic Bank and Danubian Joint-Stock Company merged to form the Adriatic-Danubian Bank. Its first chairman was Vladimir Matijević, also head of the Serbian Bank in Zagreb.

At that time, it had branches in Bled, Cavtat, Celje, Dubrovnik, Herceg Novi, Jelsa, Korčula, Kotor, Kranj, Ljubljana, Maribor, Metković, Prevalje, Sarajevo, Split, Šibenik, and Zagreb. The bank was severely impacted by the European banking crisis of 1931, however, after which it closed all branches except that in Kotor. It further stagnated after Germany's invasion of Yugoslavia in 1941.

== See also ==
- Banca Adriatica
- Banca dell'Adriatico
- List of banks in Yugoslavia
