= List of banks in Croatia =

The following list of banks in Croatia reflects the country's banking system which constitute the broader economy's financial sector. These banks operate within the European single market and its related banking union allowing for greater cross-border banking activity.

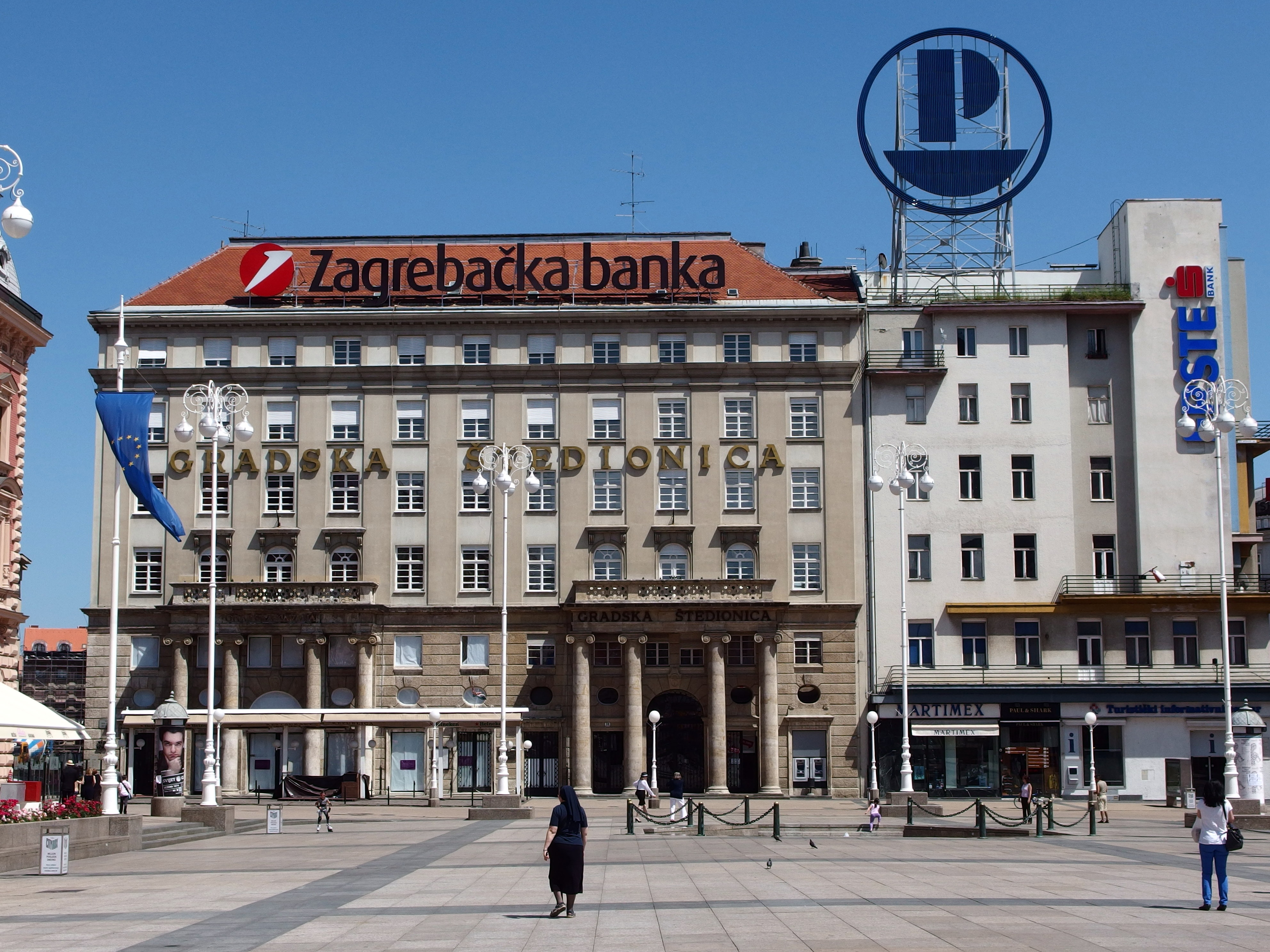
Zagreb head office of Zagrebačka banka, 2010

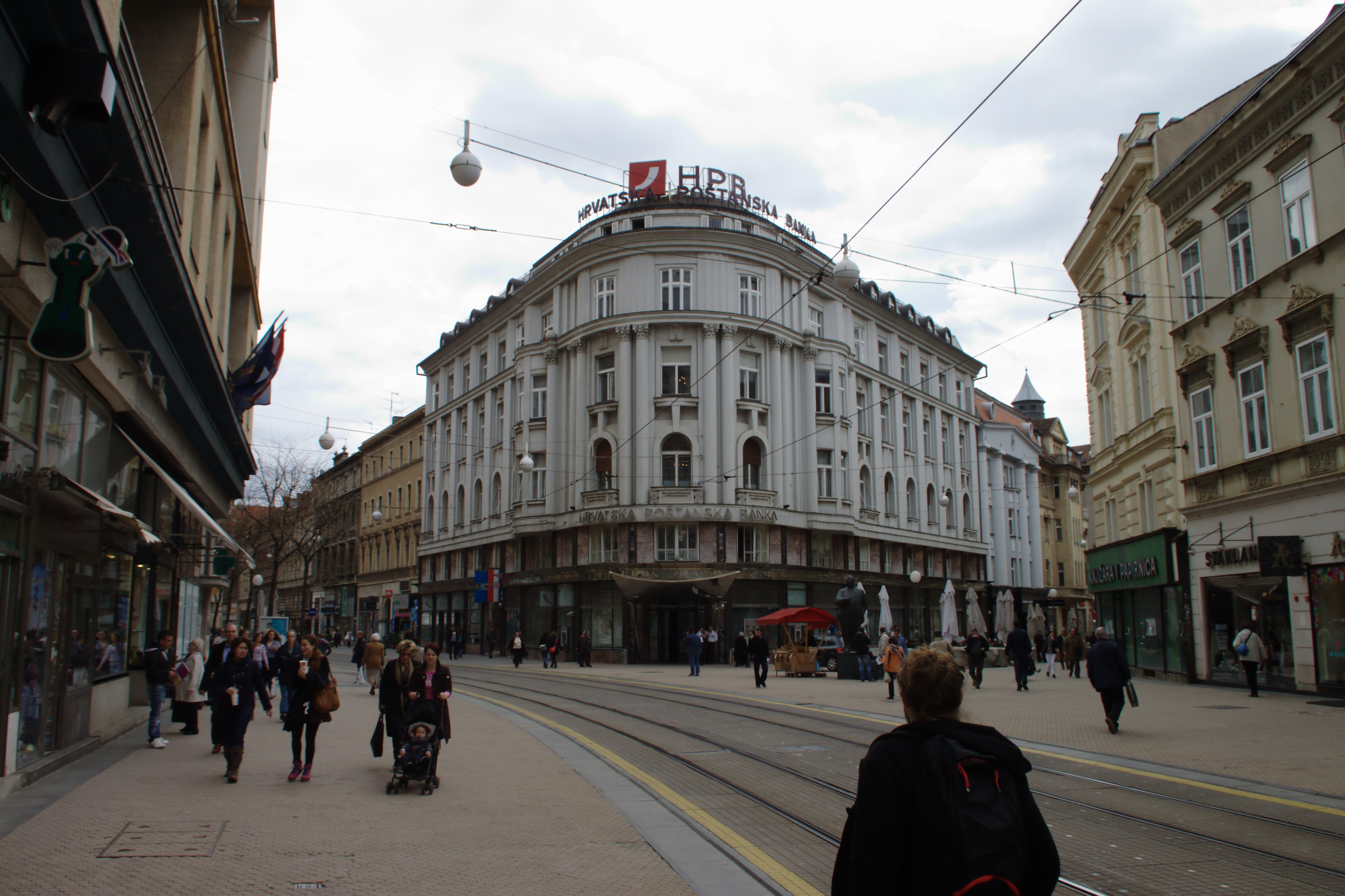
Zagreb head office of Hrvatska poštanska banka, 2013

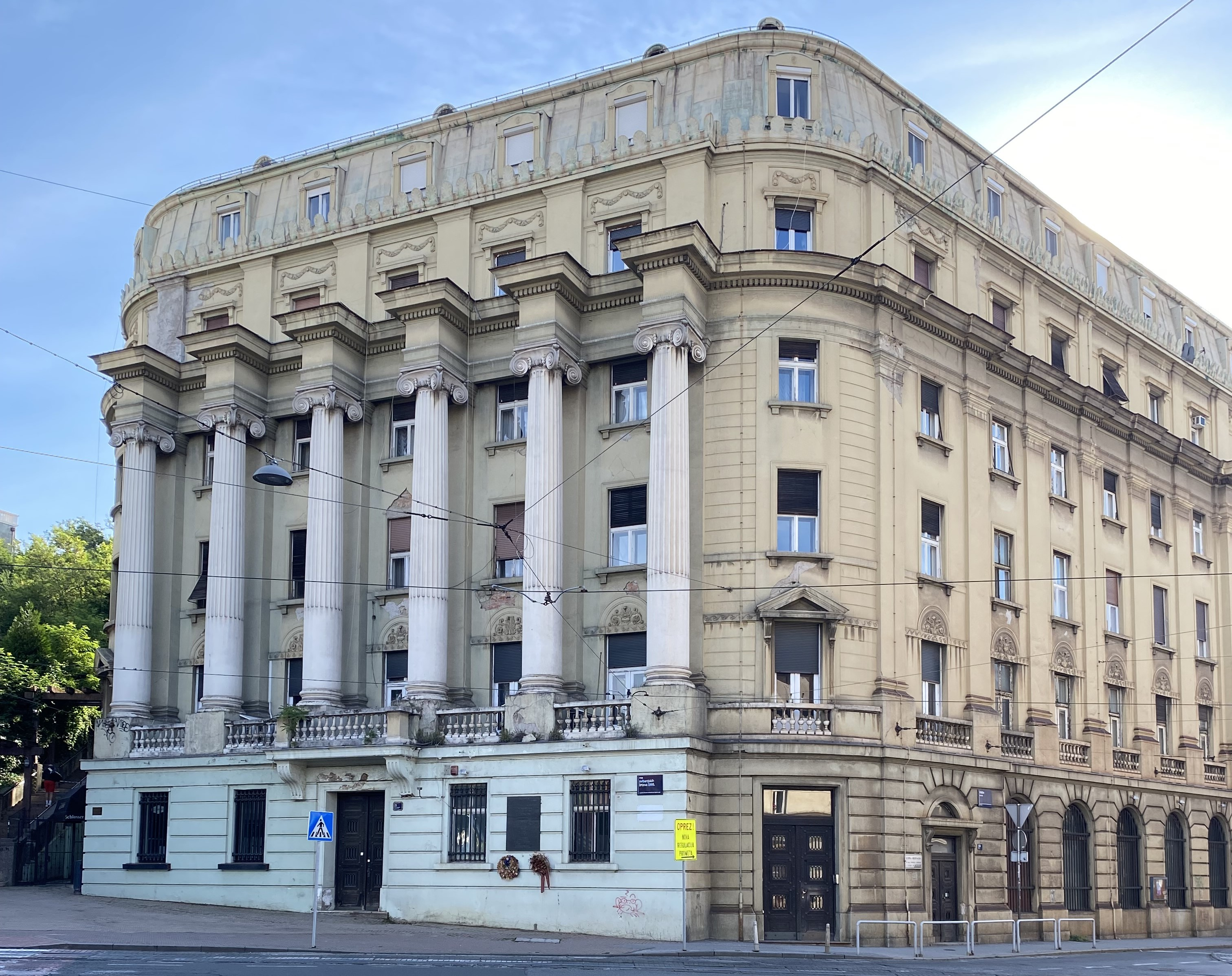
Former Zagreb head office of Slavenska Banka, 2024

== Policy framework ==
European banking supervision, which Croatia joined in 2020 in anticipation of its euro adoption in early 2023, distinguishes between significant institutions (SIs) and less significant institutions (LSIs). Croatia participates in the European banking union within the Single Supervisory Mechanism (SSM), with SI/LSI designations updated regularly by the European Central Bank (ECB). Significant institutions are directly supervised by the ECB using joint supervisory teams that involve the national competent authorities (NCAs) of individual participating countries. Less significant institutions are supervised by the relevant NCA on a day-to-day basis, under the supervisory oversight of the ECB. In Croatia's case, the NCA is the Croatian Financial Services Supervisory Agency, known as HANSA.

== Significant institutions ==
As of 1 September 2025, the list of supervised institutions maintained by the ECB included no banking group based in Croatia as SI, but five other SIs based in the euro area had subsidiaries in Croatia. A study published in 2024 ranked them as follows:

- Zagrebačka banka (total Croatian assets ca. €25 billion at end-2023), subsidiary of UniCredit
- Privredna banka Zagreb (total Croatian assets ca. €22bn), subsidiary of Intesa Sanpaolo
- Erste & Steiermärkische Bank (total Croatian assets ca. €15bn), subsidiary of the Austrian Savings Banks Group
- Raiffeisenbank Croatia (total Croatian assets ca. €7bn), subsidiary of Raiffeisen Bank International
- Addiko Bank Croatia (total Croatian assets ca. €2bn), subsidiary of Addiko Bank

== Less significant institutions ==
As of 1 September 2025, the ECB's list of supervised institutions included 15 Croatian LSIs, two of which were designated by the ECB as "high-impact" on the basis of several criteria including size:

- Hrvatska poštanska banka dd, a state-owned institution
- OTP Banka dd, subsidiary of Budapest-based OTP Bank

All 13 other Croatian LSIs were local banks:

- Agram Banka dd, in Zagreb
- Banka Kovanica dd, in Varaždin
- Croatia Banka dd, in Zagreb
- Imex banka dd, in Split
- Istarska Kreditna Banka Umag dd, in Umag
- J&T Banka dd, in Varaždin
- Karlovačka Banka dd, in Karlovac
- KentBank dd, in Zagreb
- Partner Banka dd, in Zagreb
- Podravska Banka dd, in Koprivnica
- Samoborska Banka dd, in Samobor
- Slatinska Banka dd, in Slatina
- Solvera Stambena Štedionica dd, in Zagreb

As of October 2025, there were no branches of banks located outside the European Economic Area ("third-country branches" in EU parlance) in Croatia, based on data compiled by the European Banking Authority.

== Credit unions ==
Croatia is one of six euro-area countries with credit unions, together with Estonia, Ireland, Latvia, Lithuania, and the Netherlands. Croatian credit unions are small cooperative credit institutions outside the scope of the EU Capital Requirements Directives, and thus regulated and supervised under national law. At end-2023, there were 10 such Croatian credit unions with total assets of ca. €76 million (US$83 million).

== Other institutions ==
The Croatian National Bank and Croatian Bank for Reconstruction and Development are public credit institutions that do not hold a banking license under EU law.

== Defunct banks ==
A number of former Croatian banks, defined as having been headquartered in the present-day territory of Croatia, are documented on Wikipedia. They are listed below in chronological order of establishment.

- First Croatian Savings Bank (1846–1945)
- Croatian Discount Bank (1868–1945)
- Istrian Loan Bank in Pula (1891–1928)
- Serbian Bank in Zagreb (1895–1945)
- Medulin Loan Bank (1898–1928)
- Jugoslavenska Banka (1909–1945)
- City Savings Bank of Zagreb (1913–1952)
- Slavenska Banka (1918–1925)
- Croatian State Bank (1941–1945)
- Cibalae Banka (1961–2000)
- Splitska banka (1965–2018)
- Primorska banka (2001–2018)

== See also ==
- List of banks in the euro area
- List of banks in Europe
- List of banks in Yugoslavia
