= Slavenska Banka =

Short-lived bank in Zagreb

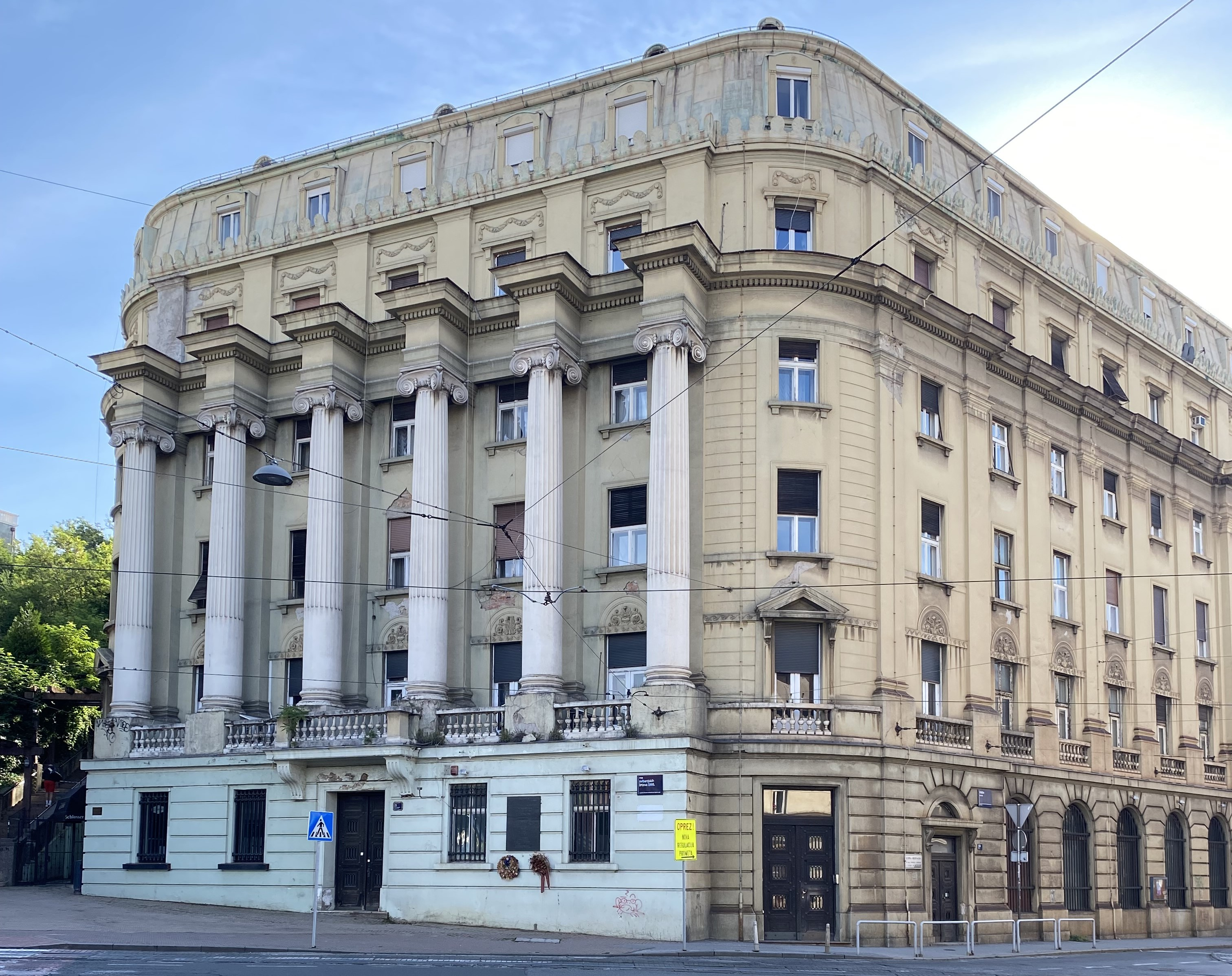
- Former head office building of Slavenska Banka in Zagreb
- Type: Public company
- Industry: Financial services
- Predecessor: National Bank (Croatian: Narodna banka d.d.)
- Founded: July 1, 1918
- Founders: Group of Zagreb-based individuals
- Defunct: 1925
- Fate: Bankrupt
- Headquarters: Zagreb, Croatia
- Area served: Croatia, Slavonia and Dalmatia
- Products: Banking services

The Slavenska Banka (lit. 'Slavic Bank') was a Croatian bank based in Zagreb. It played a prominent role in the history of Croatian and Slovenian banking in the early 1920s, before going into bankruptcy in 1925.

== History ==
The National Bank was established by a group of Zagreb-based individuals on 1 July 1918, as the collapse of Austria-Hungary looked increasingly likely, with a view that it might become the central bank for a future autonomous or independent Croatia. In 1920 it took over the small savings bank Kotarska štedionica d.d., which had been founded in nearby Kotari in 1911 and relocated to Zagreb in 1915.

On 1 February 1920, an Act on the National Bank granted it the privilege of issuing banknotes, and it was to take over the former branches of the Austro-Hungarian Bank in Croatia, Slavonia and Dalmatia. This, however, placed it in direct competition with the National Bank of the Kingdom of Serbia as monetary authority of the newly formed Kingdom of Serbs, Croats and Slovenes. A compromise was quickly negotiated that repurposed the National Bank in Zagreb as a commercial bank; the Belgrade-based National Bank changed its name to National Bank of the Kingdom of Serbs, Croats and Slovenes, while the Zagreb-based National Bank renamed itself as Slavenska Banka as was formally registered in 1921.

The Slavenska Banka remained ambitious, however, as illustrated by the palatial head office it commissioned in Zagreb. In April 1922 it absorbed two smaller rivals, the Bjelovar Savings Bank (Serbo-Croatian: Bjelovarska štedionica in central Croatia and the Yugoslav Union Bank (Serbo-Croatian: Jugoslavenska Union banka) in Belgrade, itself formed from the Maribor Discount Bank (Serbo-Croatian: Mariborska eskomptna banka). As a consequence of the latter transaction, the Slavenska Banka gained a significant footprint in Slovenia and entered a business relationship with the Paris-based Banque des Pays de l'Europe Centrale, which subsequently invested in its capital. The Slavenska Banka also became a shareholder of the Ljubljana Credit Bank in which it gained a board seat. By 1924, it had branches in Belgrade, Bjelovar, Slavonski Brod, Celje, Dubrovnik, Gornja Radgona, Kranj, Ljubljana, Maribor, Murska Sobota, Novi Sad, Osijek, Sarajevo, Sombor, Sušak, Šabac, Šibenik, and Vršac, as well as affiliates in Ljubljana and Split and a foreign branch in Vienna. At that time, it was one of the prominent joint-stock banks based in Zagreb which formed the core of the Yugoslav commercial banking sector, together with the First Croatian Savings Bank, Croatian Discount Bank, Jugoslavenska Banka, Serbian Bank in Zagreb, and Croatian-Slavonian Land Mortgage Bank.

The Belgrade-based National Bank, however, frowned upon its Croatian rival continuing foreign exchange transactions, and pushed it into bankruptcy in 1925 and later liquidation.

== Head office building ==
The head office building that was commissioned by Slavenska Banka in 1921 and completed in 1923, located at Vlaška Street 53, counts among the significant works of architect Hugo Ehrlich. The opulent head office building was purchased in 1928 by the State Mortgage Bank of Yugoslavia, which relocated its Zagreb branch there from its previous address at Ilica 12.

The former banking hall inside retains frescoes by Jozo Kljaković. It has been designated as a protected cultural asset in 2011. As of 2020, it hosted offices of the local financial agency and apartments. It suffered some damage in the 2020 Zagreb earthquake and higher floors became too dangerous to use.

== See also ==
- First Croatian Savings Bank
- Croatian Discount Bank
- List of banks in Croatia
- List of banks in Yugoslavia
