= Danilo Medaković =

Serbian Writer and newspaper publisher (1819–1881)

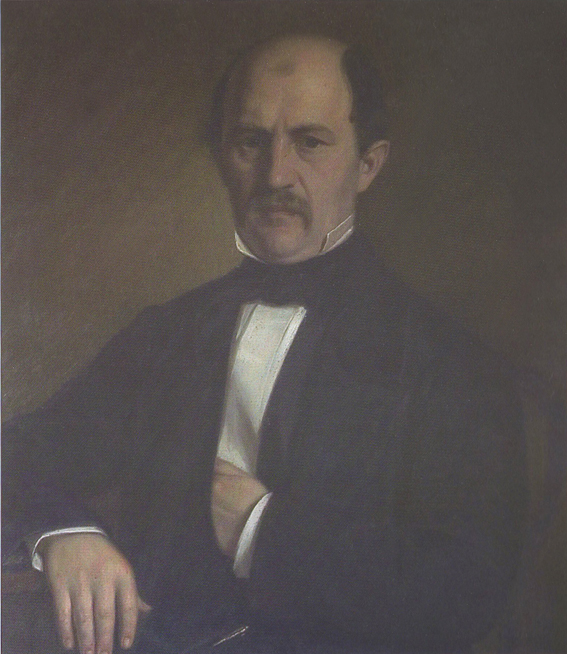
Danilo Medaković

Danilo Medaković (17 December 1819 – 5 November 1881) was a Serbian writer, journalist, and publisher. Born in the Habsburg monarchy, Medaković became one of Serbia's leading publicists and owned a printing press in Novi Sad, where he published several periodicals, magazines, and three newspapers, both political and literary.

Danilo Medaković was active in the printing trade in the mid-nineteenth century and managed to acquire the Bible patent and associated liturgical texts and manuscripts. He had significant financial resources and maintained connections with the Obrenović family and members of the court.

== Early life ==
Danilo Medaković was born in 1819 in the village of Zrmanja near Gračac, at the time in the Croatian Military Frontier of the Habsburg monarchy. He received his secondary education at the gymnasium in Zadar (then in the Habsburg Kingdom of Dalmatia) under teachers who inspired in him an enduring love of classical authors.

After completing high school in 1838, he moved to the Principality of Serbia, where he worked as a government employee under knez Miloš Obrenović.

He left Serbia for Austria in 1842 together with Mihailo Obrenović. A proponent of the Obrenović dynasty, he advocated the idea of harmony and unity between Serbs, Croats, and Slovenes.

He studied jurisprudence at the University of Vienna from 1845 to 1846, finishing with the degree of Doctor of Roman Law. In 1846–47 he studied history at the Humboldt University of Berlin. There he was a student of Theodor Mommsen.

Milorad Medaković, also a writer and publisher, was his younger brother.

== Printing and publishing ==
He became interested in the printing trade and borrowed money from Jovan Obrenović to buy the printing house of Pavle Janković in Novi Sad.

He was first heard of as a publisher on 14 November 1848, when he launched the newspaper Napredak, printed in Sremski Karlovci. Because of the Revolutions of 1848 in the Habsburg areas, it moved to Zemun in 1849.

Because he acted in opposition to Josif Rajačić, he was arrested, and his paper ceased publication in June 1849.

Napredak was published thanks to Jevrem Obrenović's support. Medaković was a retainer of Jevrem Obrenović, and through the influence of the brother of the Serbian prince, Medaković secured a small position at the court of Prince Miloš Obrenović. Medaković formulated a scheme for the establishment of a Serbian printing house on the model of those in Rome, Turin, and Venice.

At the same time, he entered into political and literary work, publishing the newspapers Napredak (Progress, 1848–1852), Srpski Dnevnik (Serbian Daily, 1852–1858), and Sedmica (Weekly, 1852–1858), as well as the almanacs Lasta and Godišnjak.

Napredak was the first newspaper in the country to be written in Vuk Karadžić's reformed Serbian. In 1849 he began his career as a Bible printer, having obtained a privilege to print the St. Petersburg version of the Bible in Serbia. In 1849 he purchased an extensive patent that included the Old and New Testament in Serbian, with or without notes, of any translation. The full patent granted Medaković the office of royal printer of all statutes, books, bills, Acts of Parliament (Sabor), proclamations, injunctions, Bibles, and New Testaments in the Serbian tongue of any translation, all service books to be used in churches, and all other volumes ordered to be printed by the Crown Prince or Sabor (Parliament).

In May 1859, he sold the printing house, Srbski dnevnik, Godišnjak, and Lasta to bishop Platon Atanacković, and moved to Belgrade.

As a publisher he had business connections with many important Serbs, and after he settled in Belgrade, he soon became a person of some importance. He consorted with Jovan Ilić, Bogoboj Atanacković, Ljubomir Nenadović, Milica Stojadinović Srpkinja, Josif Rajačić, Stanojlo Petrović, Prince Mihailo Obrenović, Milivoje Petrović Blaznavac, and Petar II Petrović Njegoš.

== Literary work ==
Medaković began his career as a man of letters with Serbske-narodne vitežke pjesme od Andrije Kačića Miošića (with a preface by Danilo Medaković), which was issued in 1849. This work was published in Vuk's reformed Serbian and was received with much favor. His next book, Poviestnica srbskog naroda od najstarijih vremena do 1850 (Tales of the Serbian People from Ancient Times to 1850), in four volumes, published in 1851 and 1852, had all the qualities that were soon to make him famous, and its power was immediately recognized by some of the best critics of the day. Encouraged by the reception of Poviestnica srbskog naroda, he edited and published in rapid succession ten works of Dositej Obradović, Đuro Daničić's translation of Andrej Muravjev's Pisma o sluzvi božijoj u pravoslavnoj crkvi, Božidar Petranović's Istorija književnosti, and the almanacs Godišnjak and Lasta (after the dissolution of his newspaper Napredak). This series of books won Medaković an assured place in Serbian literature, and during the rest of his life, every work he produced or published was welcomed by a wide circle of admirers. His works are preserved in the library of the Serbian Academy of Arts and Sciences, of which he was a member from 1853.

== St. Andrew's Day assembly ==
A crucial event in the political life of Serbia, and in political publicist writing as well, was the Saint Andrew's Day Assembly, held in Belgrade at the end of 1858. The battle of the bourgeoisie and liberal intelligentsia for constitutionality and parliamentarism started with it. After the Assembly, two basic political streams were formed, the liberal and the conservative, which fought among themselves for influence among the people through the newspapers. Prince Miloš, who was already growing old, occasionally supported liberals and occasionally conservatives, finally coming to rely on the conservatives. It is important that both sides had a chance to present their ideas and programs. The foundations of modern Serbian publicist writing were laid down in that short period (1859). The most eminent journalists were the writer Matija Ban, on the side of the conservatives, and the politician Vladimir Jovanović, on the side of the liberals. Danilo Medaković had to steer his newspapers between the two at times, not favoring one party over the other.

== Later life and legacy ==
Medaković's business continued to thrive, and from 1859 onwards he conducted it mainly through his deputies, Jovan Đorđević, who took over the management of the newspaper Srpski dnevnik, and Platon Atanacković, who ran the printing and publishing end. Medaković managed to obtain a renewal of his exclusive patent with reversion for life to his son Bogdan. Father and son lived in Belgrade until 1862, when he returned to Novi Sad. Danilo Medaković also had a house in Zagreb, to which he retired in 1878, and there he died in 1881. Greatly disturbed by the situation in Croatia, particularly by the anti-Serbian mood, the aged Danilo Medaković, who had recently moved to Zagreb from Novi Sad to spend the rest of his days there, wrote to a friend on 28 February 1878:

The rabid feelings against the Serbs which have reached such a pitch here have gotten on my nerves so much so that I myself am considering moving away from here (cited in Đorđe Popović-Daničar, Dr. Danilo Medaković, Otadžbina IX, No. 36, page 613).

Medaković and his deputies had supplied Serbia with about seventy editions of the Scriptures between 1859 and 1888, and they were accurate and well printed. With his brother and other associates, Medaković established three Serbian newspapers—Napredak (Progress), Vestnik (News), and Pozornik (Sentinel)—that played a major role in disseminating information to Serbs in their homeland and abroad during the maelstrom of the 1848 Revolution in Austria.

The revolutionary wave that spread over Europe in 1848 had a great influence on the development of Serbian journalism, especially in Vojvodina. After the fall of Metternich's absolutism and the suspension of censorship in the Austrian monarchy, the national question became a leading theme of the Serbian press. Political editorials and reports of correspondents prevailed in the newspapers instead of professional articles in installments. The best representative of this new brand of journalism was the newspaper Napredak (The Progress), which was published during the March Revolution in Sremski Karlovci and in Zemun. Its publisher and editor-in-chief was Danilo Medaković, who earned his doctoral degree in philosophy in Berlin and was a collaborator on several European newspapers. According to Jovan Skerlić, the first historian of the Serbian press, Napredak was a "decisively national newspaper," which occasionally supported progressive European ideas.

Danilo Medaković was the first journalist in Vojvodina of whom it might be said that he managed to achieve some material success. At the March Revolution, he started to issue the newspaper Napredak at Sremski Karlovci, which was immediately established among the people—it brought news obviously interesting to the broad masses. Napredak was supported by the pen and intellectual strength of Danilo Medaković and Djordje Popović-Daničar. The conception of the paper was not a firm one; it often vacillated and shared the fate of the different views of its editors, who, in editing the paper and determining its trend, followed a wide variety of paths, not necessarily to the detriment of the paper. A literary, informative, and general-interest bi-weekly, Južna Pčela, however, published and edited by Milorad Medaković, Danilo's brother, filled the void left by the short-lived Vojvodjanka in Zemun in 1851. It wrote about all matters of interest to the Serbs, ranging from internal political affairs in Serbia and Montenegro and the social and political position of Christians in Turkey, especially in Bosnia, to Serbo-Hungarian relations. It denounced the 1848 Hungarian émigrés. Milorad Medaković, who knew Petar II Petrović-Njegoš closely during the last few years of the latter's reign, wrote a biography of the famed poet entitled P. P. Njegoš, posljednji vladajući vladika crnogorski (P. P. Njegoš, the Last Ruling Prince-Bishop of Montenegro, published in Novi Sad in 1882), and many other books.

Danilo Medaković supported Stefan Stratimirović's policy, and his paper Napredak concluded that just as "there has never been liberty in Austria," so now "there never will be," because Austria and liberty "are perpetual enemies." That turning point came about after the 1848 Revolution, when the Austrian government reneged on its promises and began to suppress all Serbian institutions in the Empire.

He was among the many followers of Vuk Karadžić's reforms. He supported Karadžić's principle that the native language is the people's most precious wealth and the manifestation of the people's worth.

His son Bogdan Medaković was a Serbian lawyer and representative in the Croatian Sabor in Austria-Hungary, and his great-grandson Dejan Medaković was a Serbian writer, historian, and scholar.

== His chief work ==
- Poviestnica srbskog naroda od najstarijih vremena do 1850, in four volumes, published in Novi Sad in 1851 and 1852.
- An urban neighbourhood in Belgrade, Serbia, is named Medaković.

== Sources ==
- Jovan Skerlić, Istorija nove srpske književnosti (Belgrade, 1914, 1921), pages 203 and 204
- Serbian Academy of Sciences and Arts: http://www.sanu.ac.rs/English/Clanstvo/IstClan.aspx?arg=324,
- "Medaković, Danilo". Croatian Encyclopedia (in Croatian).
- Medaković, Dejan (2004). "DANILO MEDAKOVIĆ – novinar, povjesničar, izdavač". Srbi u Zagrebu (in Serbian). Novi Sad: Prometej – via SKD Prosvjeta.
