= Zaveštanje =

2016 Serbian documentary film

- Directed by: Ivan Jović
- Written by: Ivan Jović
- Music by: Ana Ćurčin; Goran Antović
- Production companies: Cinnamon Films; Terirem produkcija
- Release date: 2016
- Running time: 91 minutes
- Country: Serbia
- Language: Serbian

Zaveštanje (Serbian Cyrillic: Завештање, lit. 'The Testament') is a 2016 Serbian documentary film directed by Ivan Jović. The film features firsthand testimonies from survivors of World War II-era death camps operated by the Independent State of Croatia (NDH), focusing on their experiences of survival, acts of solidarity, and post-war reconciliation. Stylistically compared to Shoah (1985), the film relies exclusively on oral histories without archival footage. Jović has stated plans for sequels.

== Production ==
Jović and his team conducted 94 interviews between 2012 and 2015, amassing 450 hours of footage. Post-production was handled by Belgrade-based studio Living Pictures.

Principal interviews were recorded across:

- Serbia: Belgrade, Novi Sad, Zrenjanin, Hetin, Čestereg, Ritopek, Žitište, Boleč, and Ruma.
- Republika Srpska: Banja Luka, Prijedor, Kozarska Dubica, and surrounding areas.

== Release ==
=== Premiere and screenings ===
The film premiered in Belgrade in late 2016. Its international debut occurred at the 2017 Moscow International Film Festival. Subsequent screenings included:

- Balkan countries (shown twice in Zagreb at Privrednik cultural forums).
- Austria, Sweden, Israel, Australia.

=== Archival preservation ===
Full interview recordings are archived at:

- Yad Vashem Holocaust memorial (Israel).
- Charles University's Malach Center for Visual History (Prague).

== See also ==
- Jasenovac concentration camp
- Stara Gradiška concentration camp
- Genocide of Serbs in the Independent State of Croatia
- List of Holocaust films
