= Đorđe Popović-Daničar =

Serbian writer and diplomat (1832–1914)

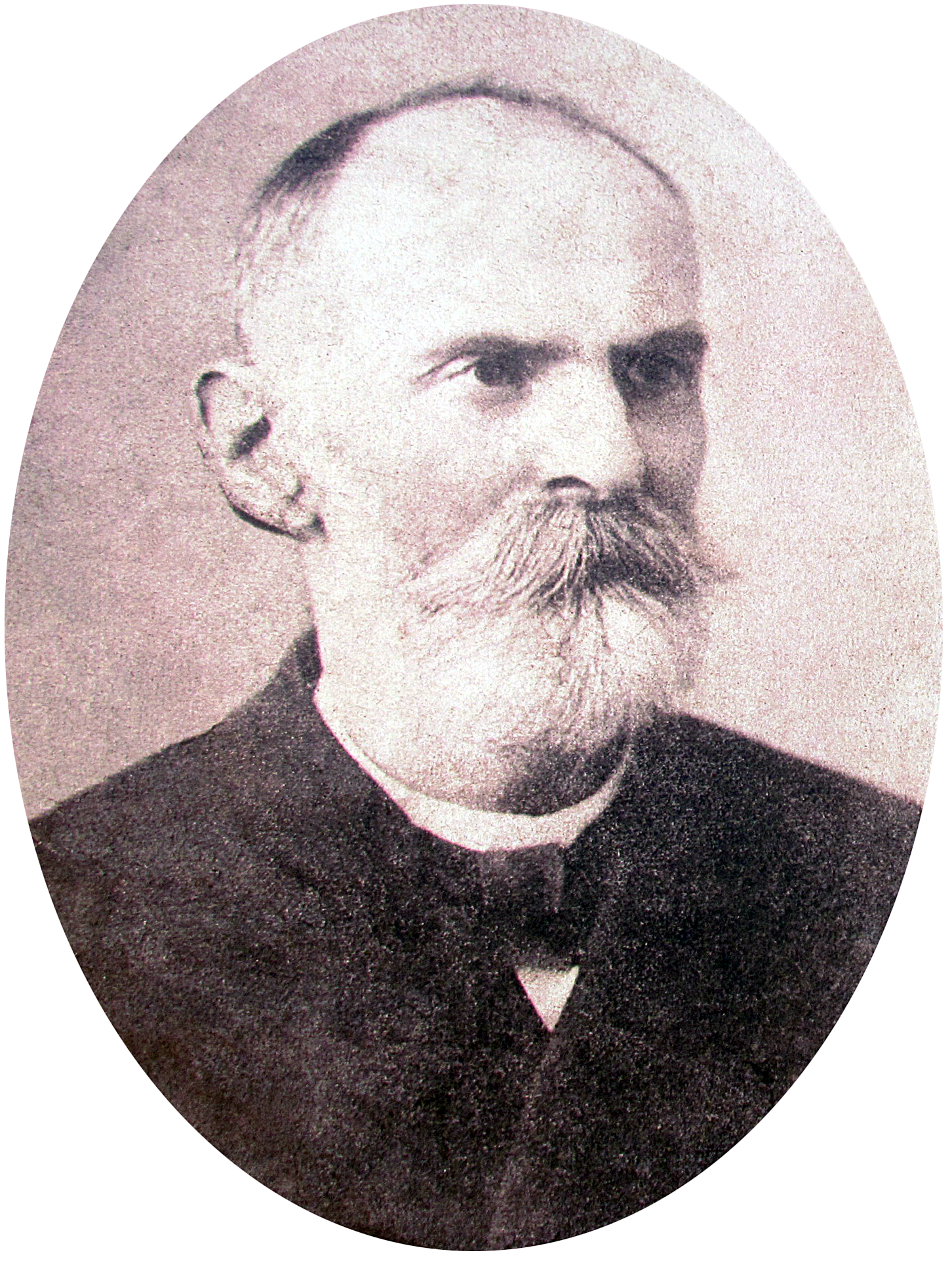
Đorđe Popović-Daničar

Đorđe "Đoko" Popović-Daničar (1 November 1832 - 7 April 1914) was a Serbian journalist who as editor of Sedmica (Weekly), Srpski Dnevnik (Serbian Daily), Danica (Morningstar) and Napredak (Progress) established its reputation and founded a tradition of independent journalism. He is credited for being the first Serbian to translate the works of Miguel de Cervantes. in late 1888, he was a Serbian consul in Skoplje during the time of the Ottoman Empire.

== Biography ==
Born in Bukovac (Austrian Empire at the time), as the son of a jurist, Djordje Popović was educated at the Belgrade Lyceum. Upon graduation, abandoning the idea of being called to the bar, he began writing on politics, literature, and theatre in Srpski dnevnik (Serbian Daily), to which he contributed literary portraits under the pseudonym "Daničar," after the name of the paper he founded.

The turning point in Djordje Popović-Daničar's career came on 10 March 1860 when he first started to publish Danica (Morning Star) in Novi Sad, then part of Austria-Hungary. The first issue of Danica came out on 20 February 1860, and the last 20 August 1872. Issues of the magazine were coming out every ten days, with an interruption from August 1871 to May 1872. Đorđe Popović initiated and edited this magazine from the first issue until August 1871.

The third paper of those times was Napredak (Progress, 1863-1869) supported by the pen and intellectual strength of Djordje Popović-Daničar and his colleagues, Danilo Medaković, Mihailo Polit-Desančić and Jovan Jovanović Zmaj. The conception of the paper was not a firm one, it often vacillated and shared the fate of the differing views of its editors, who edited the paper and its trend.

Daničar's influence on the Serbian language at the time, while it was undergoing reforms, has been significant enough to warrant a study a century later.

It wasn't until forty years later that Daničar's work was completed and published. In 1864, eight chapters from Part I of Miguel de Cervantes's "Don Quixote" were rendered into Serbian.

A contemporary of events, Djordje Popović-Daničar once described the spirit prevailing in Serbia in one of the newspapers he was writing:

"When it was learned in Belgrade how Serbia had fared at the Treaty of San Stefano (1878) everyone was dismayed...."

He was a corresponding member of the Society of Serbian Letters, elected on 21 January 1862. Also, a member of the Serbian Learned Society, appointed on the date of its foundation 29 May 1864. He was elected full member on 30 January 1885, at the Committee for Philosophical and Philological Sciences. He became a member of the Serbian Royal Academy on 15 November 1892.

From 1876, he was a clerk of the National Press Bureau in Belgrade, from 1888 he was the general consul of Serbia in Skopje (during the time of the Ottoman Empire), and the curator of the National Library of Serbia

He died in Belgrade, at the time in the Kingdom of Serbia.

== Legacy ==
Daničareva Street in Belgrade is named after Popović's nickname.

It was Djordje Popović-Daničar who discovered the poetic talents of Laza Kostić.
