= Serbian Bank in Zagreb =

Former bank in Croatia, then Yugoslavia

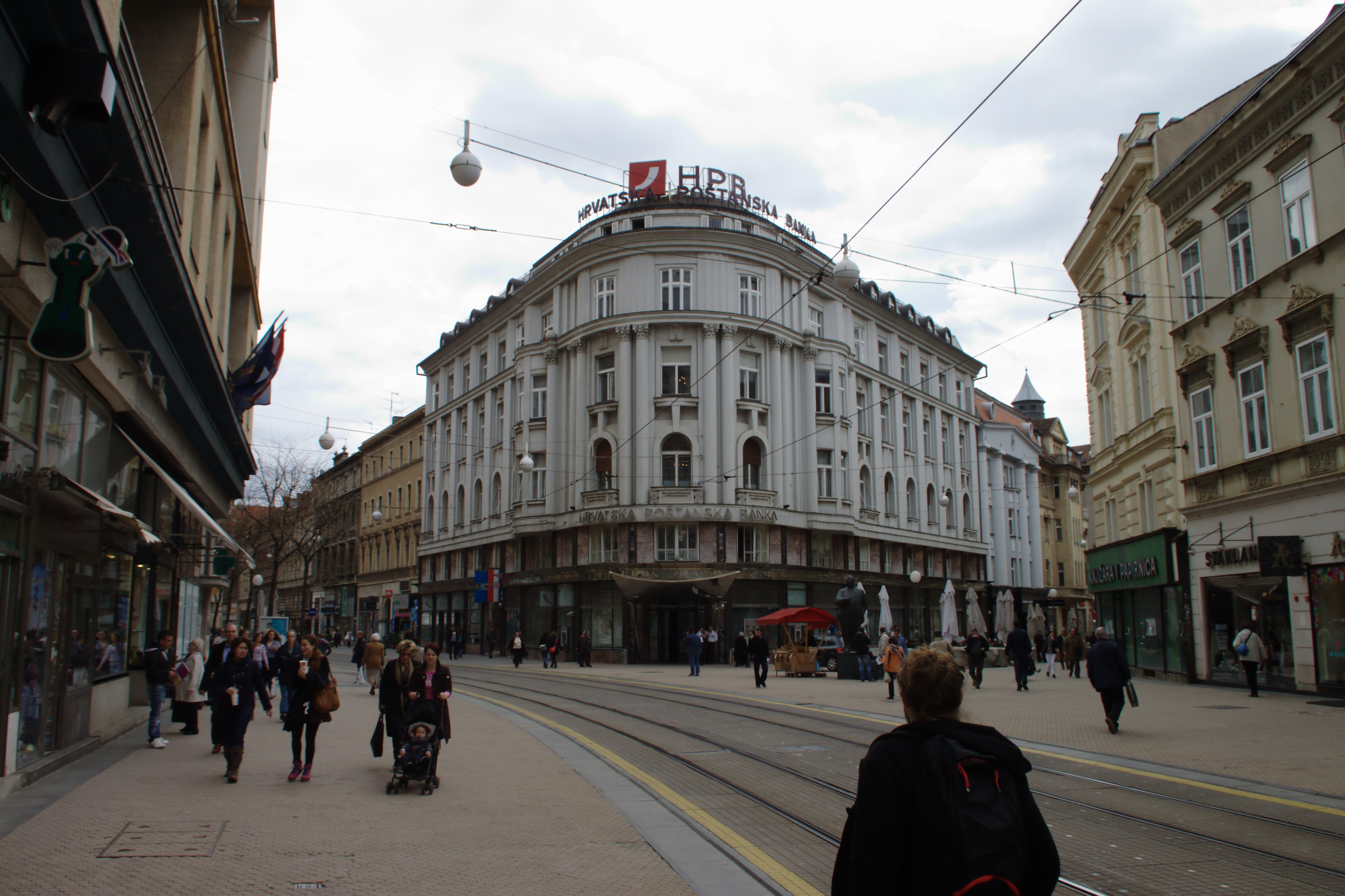
Former head office building of the Serbian Bank in Zagreb (1914), later head office of Hrvatska poštanska banka

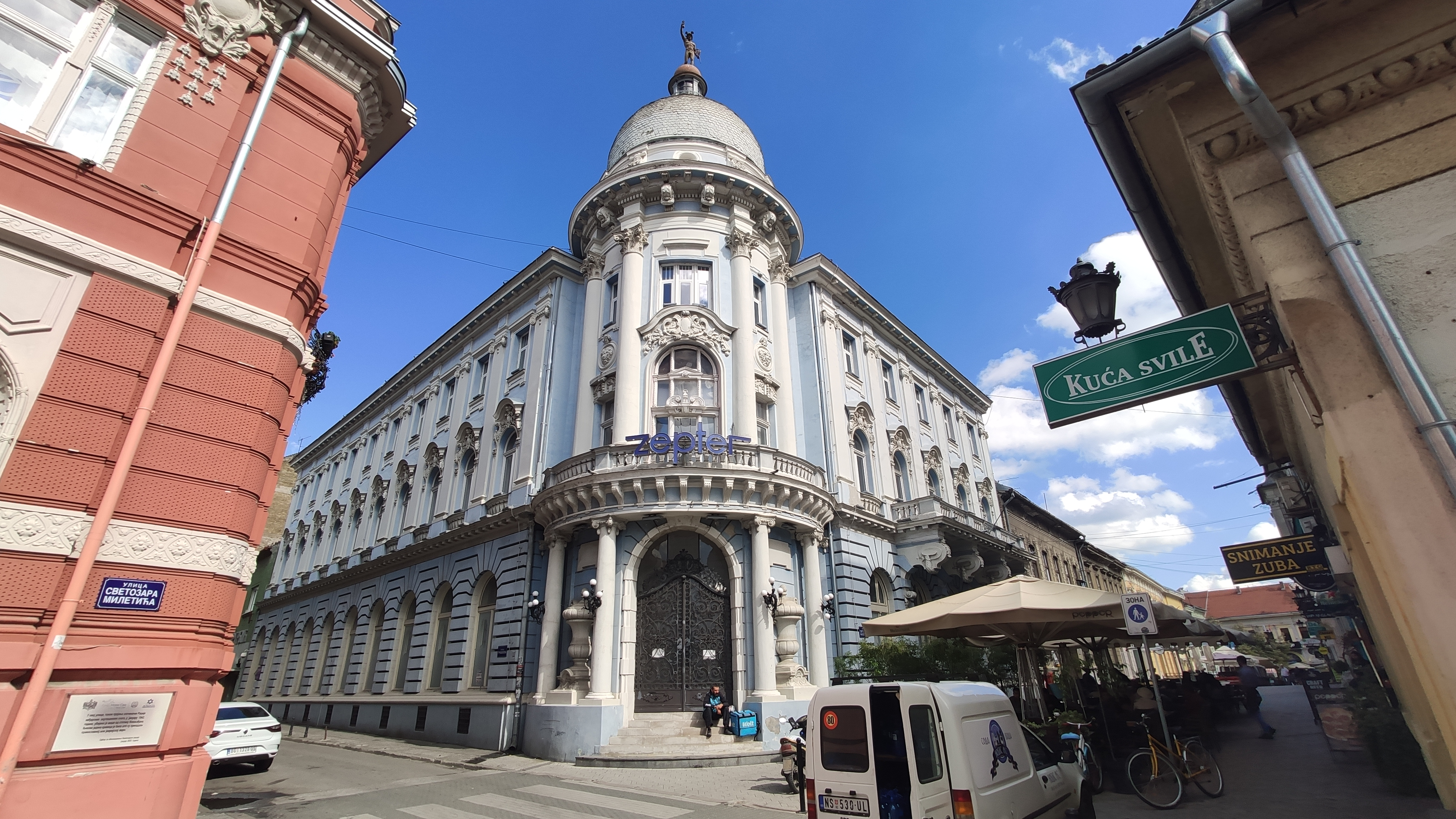
Former head office of the Central Credit Institute in Novi Sad, acquired by the Serbian Bank in 1914

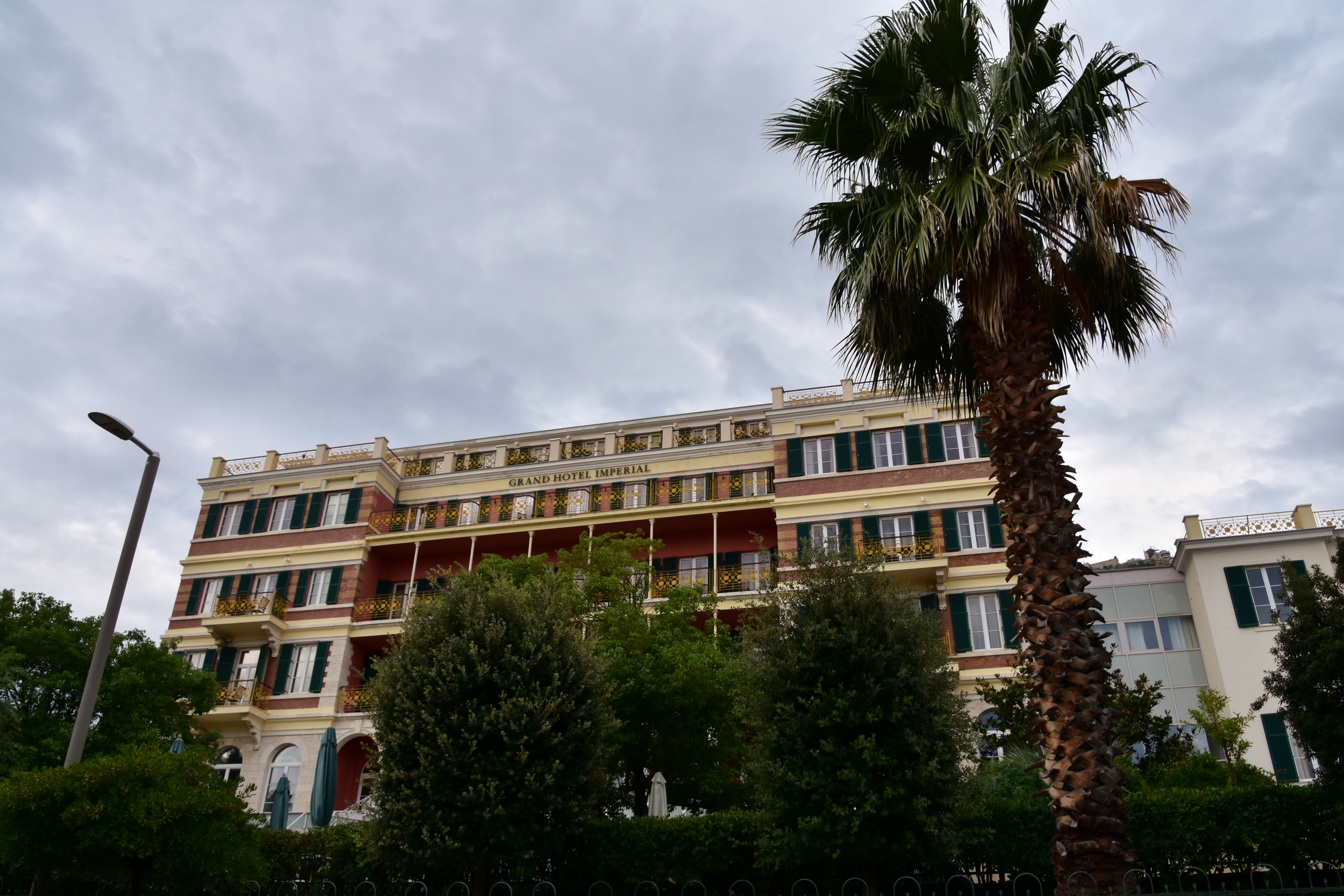
The Imperial Hotel in Dubrovnik, formerly owned by the Serbian Bank

The Serbian Bank in Zagreb (Croatian: Srpska banka u Zagrebu) was a medium-sized bank in the Kingdom of Hungary and then the Kingdom of Yugoslavia, established in 1895 and liquidated in 1945. It has been described as "the financial center of the Serbian irredentist movement".

== History ==
The bank was founded on 3 April 1895 in Zagreb. The initial capital was provided by ethnic-Serbian entrepreneurs in Croatia as well as Syrmia, Bačka and Banat, regions that were then all part of the Kingdom of Hungary. Among the founders were Lazar Bačić, Vladimir Matijević, Bogdan Medaković, Livije Radivojević, and Jovan Živković, most of which were also associated with the creation of the Privrednik ethnic-Serbian business association in 1897. Kosta Taušanović, a political leader in the neighboring Kingdom of Serbia, was in Zagreb at the time and provided support for the bank's creation.

In 1910, as political conditions did not allow it to maintain a branch in the Kingdom of Serbia, the Serbian Bank established the "Danubian Joint-Stock Company" (Croatian: Podunavsko - Trgovačko Akcionarsko Društvo) as its affiliate in Belgrade. In 1914, it absorbed the Central Credit Institute (Serbian: Centralni Kreditni Zavod), another ethnic-Serbian bank in Novi Sad. That same year, it moved to a prominently located office building near Ban Jelačić Square.

In the interwar period, it was one of the prominent joint-stock-banks based in Zagreb which formed the core of the Yugoslav commercial banking sector, together with the First Croatian Savings Bank, Croatian Discount Bank, Jugoslavenska Banka, Slavenska Banka, and Croatian-Slavonian Land Mortgage Bank. By 1924, it had branches in Dubrovnik, Knin, Mitrovica, Šibenik, Split, Sombor, and Subotica, in addition to Zagreb and Novi Sad. That same year, the Danubian Joint-Stock Company merged with the Belgrade-based Adriatic Bank to form the Adriatic-Danubian Bank, in which the Serbian Bank was the reference shareholder. The Serbian Bank owned prestige assets such as the Imperial Hotel and Lapad Hotel in Dubrovnik.

In 1941, the Independent State of Croatia expropriated the owners of the Serbian Bank and had it renamed Commercial Industrial Bank (Croatian: Trgovačko industrialna banka) as a subsidiary of the newly empowered State Savings Bank (Croatian: Stedionica Nezavisne Drzave Hrvatske). The bank was liquidated in 1945 together with the entire Yugoslavian commercial banking sector.

== See also ==
- Jugoslavenska Banka
- Slavenska Banka
- City Savings Bank of Zagreb
- List of banks in Yugoslavia
