= Primorska banka =

Primorska Banka
- Company type: Public
- Industry: Finance and Insurance
- Founded: 2001 in Rijeka, Croatia
- Headquarters: Rijeka, Croatia
- Key people: Mr. Andrej Galogaža and Mr. Mario Pilat (Liquidators)
- Products: Commercial banking
- Net income: €-1.04 mln (2013)
- Total assets: €33.77 mln (2013)
- Website: www.primorska.hr

Primorska Banka d.d. was a Croatian bank established on 25 September 2001 on the foundations of its predecessor, "Primorska štedionica" d.d. Rijeka. It began its work on World Savings Day, 31 October 1997.

Primorska banka d.d. Rijeka was a regional commercial bank that operated in the city of Rijeka and the Primorje-Gorski Kotar County, Istria County and Lika-Senj County. Most of the business was carried out with residents, artisans and corporate clients of the area.

As of 21 June 2018 the bank is in liquidation.

== See also ==
- List of banks in Croatia
