= Aleksa Spasić =

Serbian economist and Minister of Finance

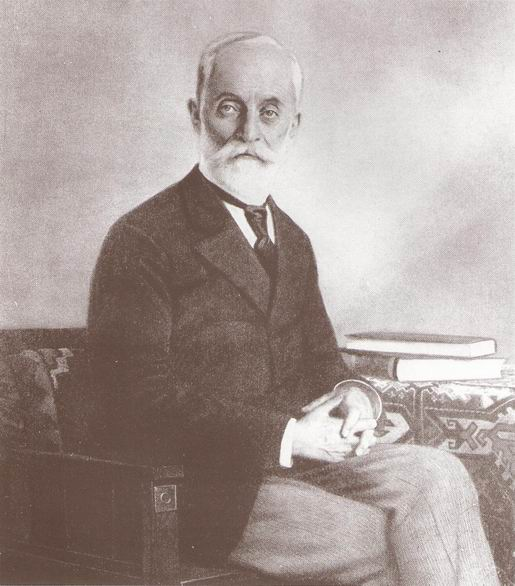
Aleksa Spasić

Aleksa Spasić (1831 - 1920) was a Serbian economist and minister.

== Biography ==
Aleksa Spasić was Minister of Finance from 1883 to 1884, deputy minister of the national economy, first Governor of the National Bank of Serbia (1884), director of the Board of Funds, member of the Serbian Learned Society, and an honorary member of the Serbian Royal Academy.

Aleksa Spasić learned financial techniques and imparted knowledge in the civil service positions he held in Serbia. He mostly wrote in the decade from 1867 to 1876. He belonged to the School of Classical economics (revered by John Stuart Mill and Adam Smith), a prominent liberal. He emphasized the importance of good institutions for the well-being of the people (constitutionality, freedom, property protection, free political institutions, democracy), then austerity and moderate taxes. He was a critic of despotism.

== Works ==
- States and Finance, 1867
- Institutions and National Treasure, 1868
- Banks and bankers, 1870
- Finances and nations, 1871
- Municipal finances in France and England, 1874
- The most important issues in political economy, 1875-1876

== See also ==
- Vladimir Matijević
- Lazar Bačić
