= Hrvatska poštanska banka =

Croatian state-owned postal bank

Hrvatska poštanska banka PLC

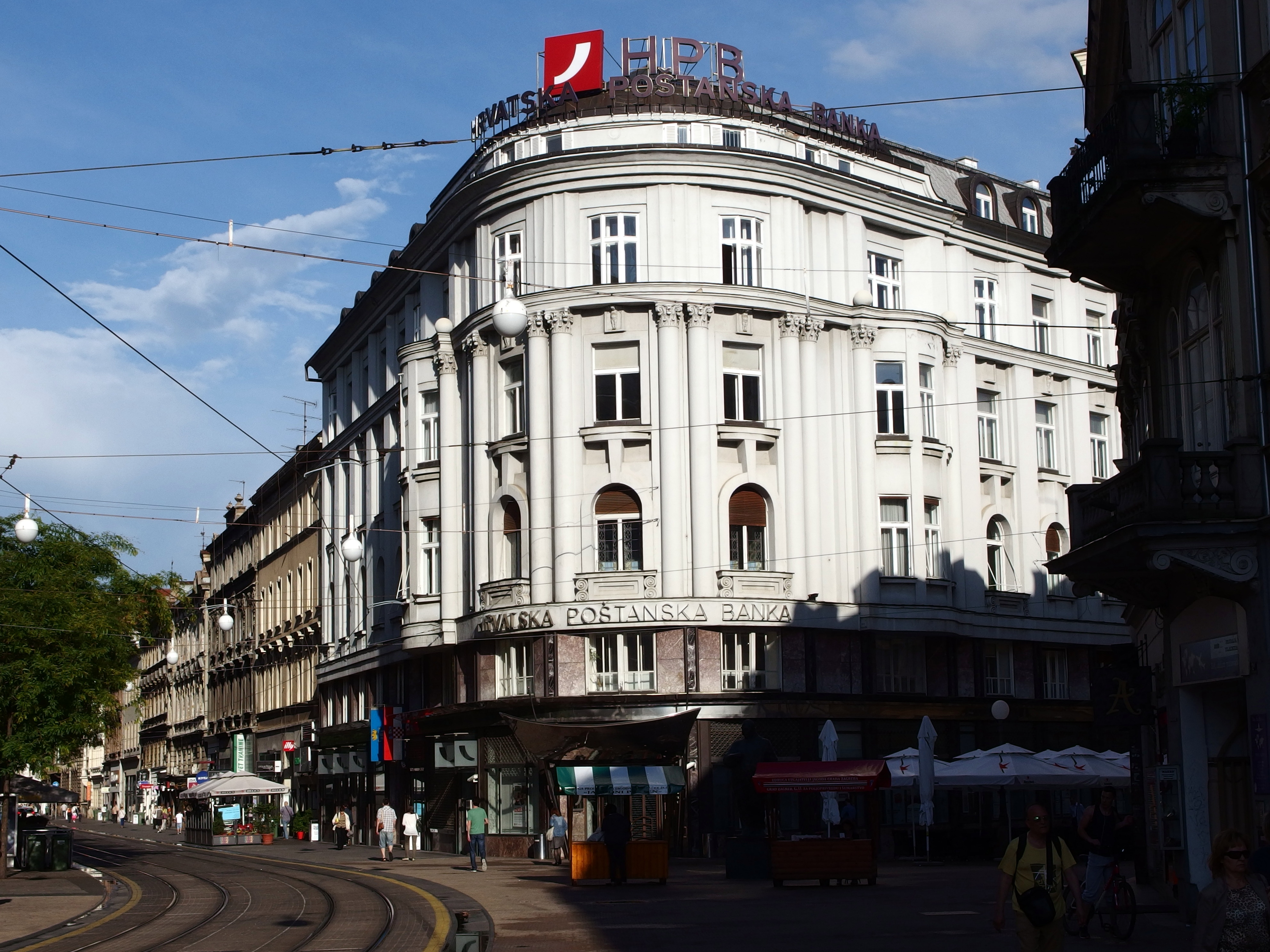
- HPB headquarters, near Ban Jelačić Square, Zagreb
- Type: Public
- Traded as: ZSE: HPB
- ISIN: HRHPB0RA0002
- Industry: Banking, Financial services
- Founded: October 1991; 35 years ago
- Founder: Croatian Post
- Headquarters: 4 Jurišićeva Street, Zagreb, Croatia
- Number of locations: 68 branch offices & approximately 700 automated teller machines (March 2024)
- Key people: Marko Badurina (President of the Management Board)
- Products: Consumer banking, corporate banking, insurance, investment banking, mortgage loans, private banking, private equity, wealth management, credit cards
- Net income: ▼€59.1 million (2025)
- Total assets: ▲€8.6 billion (2025)
- Number of employees: 1,769 (2025)
- Subsidiaries: HPB Invest d.o.o.; HPB-Nekretnine d.o.o.
- Website: www.hpb.hr/en/about-us/110

Hrvatska poštanska banka d.d. (lit. "Croatian Post's Bank") or HPB is the largest Croatian-owned bank in the country and ranks 5th in Croatia in terms of total assets, worth around EUR 7.046.053 thousand.

== History ==
The bank was founded in October 1991 by Hrvatska pošta, the Croatian national postal service, which was the bank's majority shareholder until 2001. Since 2001, the Government of Croatia is the majority owner of the bank, via stakes acquired by the state-owned fund Hrvatski fond za privatizaciju and the national pension fund Hrvatski zavod za mirovinsko osiguranje. HPB is listed on the Zagreb Stock Exchange.

In November 2019, the International Banker awarded Hrvatska poštanska banka as the best commercial bank of the year in Croatia. In March 2020, HPB decided to retain 2019 net profit, accepting a resolution of the Croatia's central bank.

Hrvatska poštanska banka has been designated in 2020 as a Significant Institution under the criteria of European Banking Supervision, and as a consequence is directly supervised by the European Central Bank.

In September 2021, the supervisory board of HPB appointed Marko Badurina as President of the HPB Management Board, and Anto Mihaljević and Ivan Soldo as Members of the management board. The CNB Council approved the propositions.

In March 2022, the EU unit of Sberbank went into insolvency (due to the EU sanctions in reaction to the 2022 Russian invasion of Ukraine and the Single Resolution Board decided to transfer all shares of the Sberbank's Croatian subsidiary to HPB. On the 2nd of March, HPB officially bought the local unit of Sberbank for 71 million kuna (€9.4 million euro). Sberbank Croatia changed its name to Nova hrvatska banka in March 2022, before being legally merged into HPB on 3 July 2023. In March 2026, HPB acquired a 100 % stake in Croatia banka from the Croatian Deposit Insurance Agency for €15 million.

== Ownership structure ==
	Number of shares	Percentage
Republic of Croatia	909,035	44.8989%
Croatian Post	241,610	11.9336%
Croatian Deposit Insurance Agency	181,918	8.9803%
Croatian Pension Insurance Institute	177,311	8.7577%
PBZ CO mandatory pension fund - cat. B	121,522	6.0022%
HPB own treasury shares	49	0.0024%
Others	393,280	19.4248%

== See also ==
- List of banks in the euro area
- List of banks in Croatia
