= Lazar Bačić =

Serbian merchant and philanthropist

- Лазар Бачић
- Born: January 1865; Jasenovac, Slavonian Military Frontier, Austrian Empire
- Died: 12 May 1941 (aged 76); Zagreb, Independent State of Croatia
- Resting place: Mirogoj Cemetery, Zagreb, Croatia
- Citizenship: Austrian Empire (1865–1867); Austria-Hungary (1867–1918); Kingdom of Serbs, Croats and Slovenes (1918–1929); Kingdom of Yugoslavia (1929–1941)
- Occupation: merchant
- Political party: Serb Independent Party
- Spouse: Dragica Miković

Lazar Bačić (Serbian Cyrillic: Лазар Бачић; January 1865 – 12 May 1941) was a Croatian Serb merchant and philanthropist. Ustashas used his property and industrial facilities to open the Ciglana part of the Jasenovac concentration camp. He was a prominent benefactor of Privrednik.

== Biography ==
Bačić was engaged in trade and owned several stores in Zagreb and Jasenovac, as well as a brickyard.

He was one of the founders of the Serbian Bank in Zagreb, a longtime president of the Serbian Orthodox Church Administration in Jasenovac, a member of the Board of Directors of the Pakrac Savings Bank in Pakrac and the Serbian co-operation for promotion and savings in Okučani, a member of the Supervisory Board of the Serbian Credit Cooperative in Kostajnica and the Serbian Savings Bank as a cooperative in Nova Gradiška.

=== High treason accusation ===
As a member of the Central Committee of the Serb Independent Party, in 1909 Bačić was one of 53 Serbs accused by the Austro-Hungarian Monarchy of high treason – conspiracy to overthrow the state and place Croatia-Slavonia under Serbian rule. He spent 16 months in a prison. After that he was tagged as a suspicious person, especially during the World War I.

=== Privrednik ===
Bačić was a member of the Privrednik's Patronage at the time of his establishment in 1911 and one of its greatest philanthropists. Each year, on the Lazarus Saturday, he donated ten thousand Yugoslav dinars to Privrednik. In addition to his regular cash payments, in 1921, he handed over a luxurious two-storey building with a shop at the corner of the Gaj Street and the Berislavić Street in the center of Zagreb, as well as hundred thousand dinars.

== Death ==
Bačić died in his apartment in Zagreb on 12 May 1941 and was buried at the Mirogoj Cemetery on 14 May.

His property in Jasenovac was confiscated by Ustasha Militia and used its industrial facilities to open the Ciglana part of the Jasenovac concentration camp, which existed there until 23 April 1945.

=== Sedlar controversy ===
Croatian filmmaker Jakov Sedlar in his 2016 documentary film Jasenovac – istina accused Bačić for the pre-war murders of Croats in Jasenovac and stated that he and his son Ozren had fled to Serbia where they supported the Milan Nedić's Government. Ljubica Bačić, a daughter of Ozren Bačić, rejected this accusations and confirmed that Ozren was his nephew and that he died in Zagreb.

== Personal life ==
He had a brother, Jovan, who was a merchant also. He married Dragica Miković, with whom he had no children.

== See also ==
- Aleksa Spasić
- Vladimir Matijević
