= Privredna Banka Zagreb =

Croatian bank

Privredna banka Zagreb d.d.

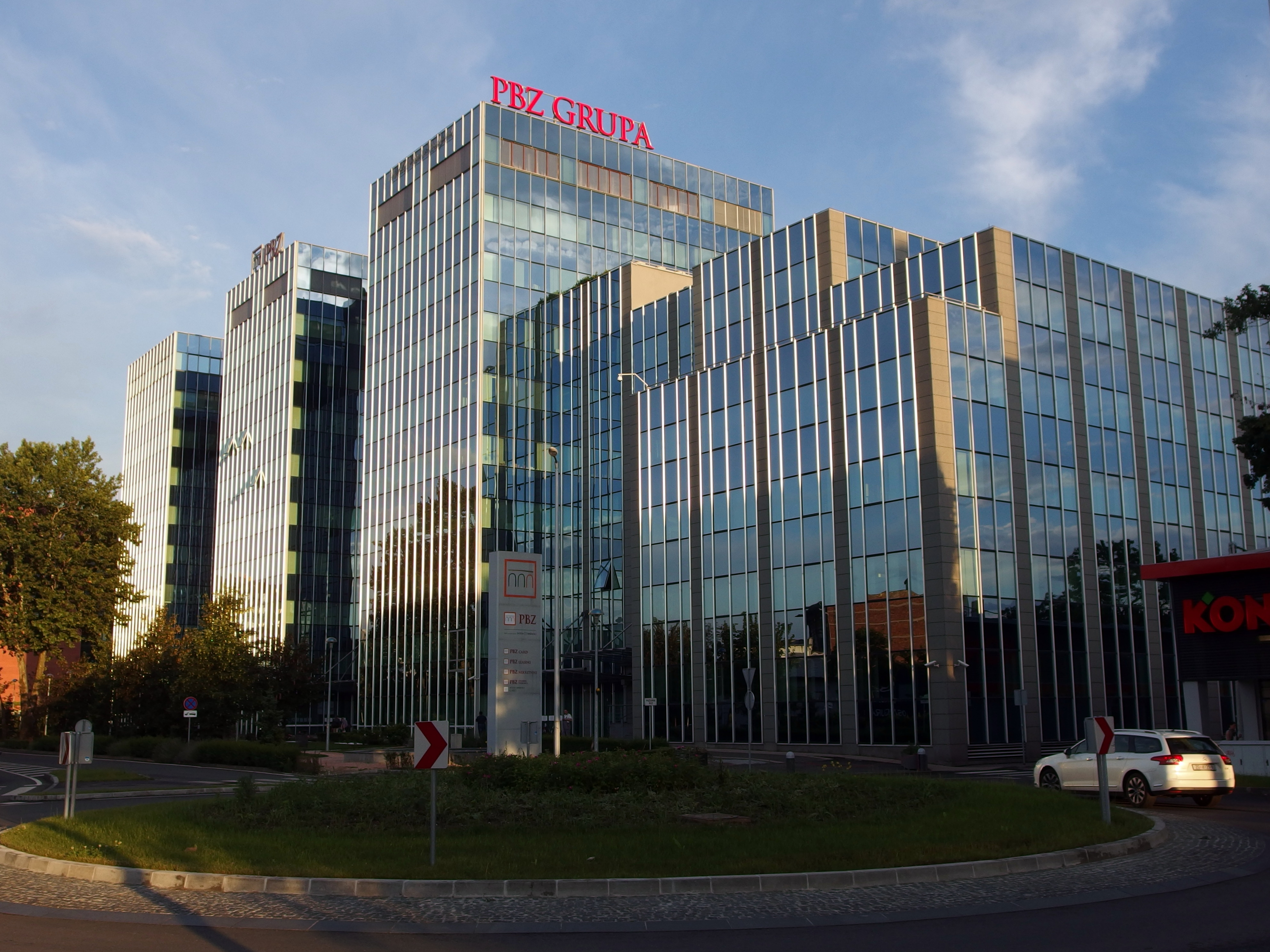
- Headquarters of PBZ in Kanal district
- Type: Public
- Traded as: ZSE: PBZ
- Industry: Banking
- Founded: 1966 (founded as state-owned; fully privatised in 1999)
- Headquarters: Zagreb, Croatia
- Key people: Dinko Lucić (CEO); Hrvoje Dajak, Vedrana Jelušić Kašić, Andrea Pavlović, Draženko Kopljar, Antonio Bergalio
- Products: Financial services
- Net income: ▲3,754 billion kunas (2022.)
- Total assets: ▲1,426 million kunas (2022.)
- Number of employees: 3381 (2022.)
- Parent: Intesa Sanpaolo
- Website: www.pbz.hr

Privredna Banka Zagreb (PBZ) is a Croatian bank that provides services to individuals and legal entities, performs card business, investment banking, private banking, rental, real estate management, brokerage and consulting services, and real estate business. It operates throughout the territory of the Republic of Croatia, Slovenia and Bosnia and Herzegovina and employs over 4,000 employees. It's a part of Intesa Sanpaolo international banking group. The total assets of the bank in 2022 amounted to 157.33 billion kunas.

== Services ==
- Daily finances
- Digital banking
- Lending
- Investments
- Insurance
- Cards
- Real estate transactions
- Brokerage business
- Consultation

== History ==
- In 1966 Privredna banka Zagreb d.d. (PBZ) was founded and is the legal successor of the Bank of the National Republic of Croatia, founded in 1962.
- In the year 1989 the bank became a joint-stock company.
- After the successful privatization in December 1999, Banca Commerciale Italiana (BCI) bought 66.3% of the shares of Privredna banka Zagreb d.d., and the State Agency for Insurance of Savings Deposits and Rehabilitation of Banks retained a share of 25% plus two shares.
- In 2000, Banca Commerciale Italiana (BCI) became part of Gruppo Intesa.
- In 2000, PBZ started implementing internet banking.
- In the year 2000, Krapinsko – zagorska banka was annexed to Privredna banka Zagreb
- During 2002, a minority share (20.88%) owned by Privredna banka Zagreb d.d. was acquired by the European Bank for Reconstruction and Development (EBRD).
- In the 2004, Privredna banka Zagreb d.d. and Riadria Bank were merged.
- In 2005, Privredna banka Laguna banka was added to the bank.
- In January 2006, card operations of Privredna banka Zagreb d.d. and PBZ American Express were integrated into a new company called PBZ Card d.o.o. which is today the leading card institution in the country.
- With the merger of two large Italian banks in 2007, Banca Intesa and Sanpaolo IMI, Privredna banka Zagreb d.d. becomes a member of the Intesa Sanpaolo Group.
- In 2012, Međimurska banka d.d. was merged with Privredna banka Zagreb d.d.
- In June 2015, by acquiring a stake (20.88%) from the EBRD, Intesa Sanpaolo increases its majority ownership stake in Privredna banka Zagreb d.d. to 97.47%.
- In July 2015, Privredna banka Zagreb d.d. took over the majority share package of Intesa Sanpaolo Banka d.d. Bosnia and Herzegovina, and in 2017 takes over 51% of the share capital of Bank Intesa Sanpaolo d.d. in Slovenia (former Banka Koper d.d.).
- In 2018, Privredna banka Zagreb d.d. took over and merged Veneto banka d.d.
- In 2022, PBZ stambena štedionica was merged with its parent bank Privredna banka Zagreb d.d.

== Prizes and awards ==
- Euromoney Awards for excellence 2021 – award for the best bank in Croatia
- Global Finance Award 2021 – award for the best bank in Croatia
- "Golden Kuna" of the Croatian Chamber of Commerce - the most prestigious domestic award
- Certificate Best employer in 2021 in accordance with the criteria of the ISF standard and employee respect - "ISF white standard Employee respect"
- Employer partner certificate awarded by Selectio Solutions d.o.o.
- People's Voice Award 2021 – one of the categories of the Best Employer brand Awards Adria
- Friend of students certificate - awarded by the eSTUDENT student association
- Global Finance Award 2022 – award for the best bank in Croatia
- Woman's Choice Award – award for the best bank in Croatia
- Best employer certificate for 2022 - in accordance with the ISF white© Employee standard
- Employer partner certificate for 2022 - awarded by the company Selectio Solutions d.o.o.
- Best Employer Brand Awards 2022 in the Banking sector category
- The Golden Index in the Scholarships category is awarded by the eSTUDENT association

== PBZ in numbers ==
- 1.99 million clients
- 1.87 million current accounts
- HRK 199.7 billion of client funds
- 715 thousand internet banking users
- 232 branches
- 1055 ATMs
- 151 day-night vaults
- 2.84 million issued cards
- 3381 employees

== See also ==
- List of banks in Croatia
- List of banks in Yugoslavia
