= Dejan Medaković =

Serbian art historian, writer and academician (1922–2008)

- Дејан Медаковић
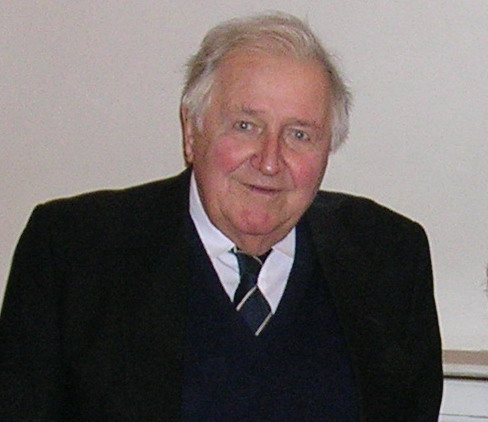
- Born: 7 July 1922; Zagreb, Kingdom of Serbs, Croats and Slovenes (modern Croatia)
- Died: 1 July 2008 (aged 85); Belgrade, Serbia
- Education: University of Belgrade
- Occupations: Art historian, writer
- Awards: Herder Prize (1990)

Dejan Medaković (Serbian Cyrillic: Дејан Медаковић; 7 July 1922 – 1 July 2008) was a Serbian art historian, writer and academician. Medaković had served as President of the Serbian Academy of Sciences and Arts from 1998 to 2003, as Dean of the University of Belgrade Faculty of Philosophy (1971–1973) and was a member of the Matica srpska as well as other scholarly associations.

== Life ==
Dejan Medaković was born on 7 July 1922 in Zagreb (then the Kingdom of the Serbs, Croats and Slovenes (now Croatia) in an ethnic Serb family. His father, Đorđe Medaković, was an economist; his mother, Anastazija, a housewife. His paternal grandfather, Bogdan Medaković, had been a political leader of Serbs in Croatia during the Austro-Hungarian reign, president of the Serb Independent Party and president of the Croat-Serb Coalition and Speaker of the Croatian Sabor from 1908 to 1918. Dejan Medaković's great-grandfather Danilo had lived in the Kingdom of Serbia and held various positions in the administrations of princes Miloš and Mihailo Obrenović. On his mother's side he was a descendant of Austrian military nobility.

Medaković finished his lower gymnasium education on the island of Badija near Korčula on the southern Adriatic coast, before moving to Sremski Karlovci, where he finished his higher gymnasium studies. During the Second World War he lived in Belgrade as a refugee. From 1942 to 1946 he worked as a volunteer-assistant in Prince Pavle's Museum in Belgrade (today the National Museum of Serbia). He graduated in 1949 and later got his doctorate in 1954 at the Belgrade Faculty of Philosophy, in the Art History Department.

He became a member of the faculty at the University of Belgrade in 1954, where he would remain until his retirement in 1982. Between 1971 and 1973 he was also the dean of the Faculty of Philosophy. He was elected as a corresponding member of the Serbian Academy of Sciences and Arts (SANU) in 1972 and was promoted to a full member in 1981. He was also a member of the European Academy of Sciences and Arts in based in Salzburg, the Austrian Society for Eighteenth-Century Studies (ÖGE 18), the Leibniz Society in Berlin, member of the Matica srpska Council in Novi Sad and the president of the Vuk Karadžić Foundation Assembly.

He held various positions at SANU: he was the Secretary of the Department for Historical Sciences (1981–85), the Secretary General of the Academy (1985–94) and in 1999 Medaković was elected President of SANU, a post which he held until 2003. At Matica srpska he was in charge of the Department of Art History. He edited the Fine Arts Digest of Matica srpska journal (Serbian: Zbornik za likovne umetnosti Matice srpske). His research interests included a wide scope of topics in art history and art criticism, from Serbian medieval art to modern painting, but his main fields of expertise were Serbian Baroque painting and general cultural circumstances of the 18th century, as well as Serbian art of the 19th century.

Please, we were set up that we wanted to tear down the country. On the contrary, Memorandum was a document which tried to stop the breakup. …When the Memorandum controversy appeared, we were applauded in the West. Afterwards it was interpreted as an anti-communist document, as a breach for some new democratic state. The country's official politics attacked us. ...In Hague the Memorandum is pulled out again. Of course, they now need another variant. That's the vortex of daily politics.

— Dejan Medaković on the SANU Memorandum

Medaković was also a writer and a poet. He published many studies, essays, monographs, reviews and articles on various topics ranging from new developments in arts to current social and political issues. His studies have been collected and published in several books: Srpski slikari XVIII-XX veka (Serbian Painters of the 18th Century) (1968), Putevi srpskog baroka (The Paths of Serbian Baroque) (1971), Istraživači srpskih starina (Explorers of Serbian Antiquity) (1985) and Barok kod Srba (The Serbian Baroque) (1988). He was also a major contributor to the six-volume History of the Serb People (1981–1993) and other important publications such as Serbian Art of the 18th Century (1980) and Serbian Art of the 19th Century (1981).

In addition, he authored several important art monographs and studies dealing with cultural heritage of the Serbian Orthodox Church, writing about the monasteries of Hilandar and Savina. Other important works by Medaković include The Chronicles of Serbs in Trieste (1987), Serbs in Vienna, Serbs in Zagreb, Images of Belgrade in Old Etchings, Selected Serbian themes and Letters. Medaković also penned five books of poetry and an autobiographical prose cycle titled Ephemeris.

Medaković was the recipient of many distinguished awards and honours: the Herder Prize; the Anton Gindely Prize; the City of Belgrade October Award; the Prosveta Annual Award; the Order of Merit of the Federal Republic of Germany (Bundesverdienstkreuz); the Austrian Cross of Honour for Science and Arts; the Gold Medal of Merit of the Republic of Hungary, the Medal of Vuk Karadžić of the First Order and many others.

He died from cancer on 1 July 2008, at the Oncological Institute of Belgrade Hospital.

== Honors and awards ==
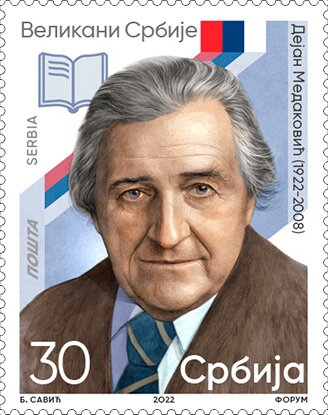
Medaković on a 2022 stamp of Serbia

- Prosveta Reward for literature, philosophy and history
- 7 July Reward of Serbia
- 1990 – Herder Prize, Republic of Austria
- Gindeli Rewards, Republic of Austria
- The Austrian Cross of Honour for Science and Arts
- October Reward of Belgrade
- Gold Medal of Merit of the Republic of Hungary
- Order of bischop of Zagreb Ist degree, Republic of Croatia
- Special Vuk's Rewards
- Annual Reward of Prosveta
- Order of Saint Sava, I degree
- Great Cross for Services to the Federal Republic of Germany
- Medal of Vuk Karadžić, I degree
- Crown of Despot Stefan Lazarević
- Golden ring of Despot Stefan Lazarević
- Bestseller reward, National library of Serbia

== Works ==
=== Research works ===
- Beograd u starim gravirama (in Serbian). 1950.
- Grafika srpskih štampanih knjiga XV—XVII veka (in Serbian). 1958.
- Stari srpski drvorez (in Serbian). 1964.
- Srpski slikari XVIII—XX veka (in Serbian). 1968.
- Putevi srpskog baroka (in Serbian). 1971.
- Tragom srpskog baroka (in Serbian). 1976.
- Oči u oči (in Serbian). 1978.
- Manastir Savina (in Serbian). 1998.
- Hilandar (in Serbian). 1978.
- Srpska umetnost u XVIII veku (in Serbian). 1980.
- Srpska umetnost u XIX veku (in Serbian). 1998.
- Sentandreja (in Serbian). 1982.
- Istraživaci srpskih starina (in Serbian). 1984.
- Letopis Srba u Trstu (in Serbian). 1987.
- Barok kod Srba (in Serbian). 1988.
- Sumrak Lovčena (in Serbian). 1989.
- Zapadnoevropski barok i vizantijski svet (in Serbian). 1989.
- Kosovski boj u likovnim umetnostima (in Serbian). 1989.
- Serbischer Barock: Sakrale Kunst im Donauraum (Serbian Baroque) (in German). Vienna: Bohlau. 1991. ISBN 978-3-205-05401-6.
- Pavle Ivić, ed. (1995) [1981]. "Serbian Art in the Eighteenth Century". The History of Serbian Culture. Translated by Randall A. Major (English translation ed.). Edgware, Middlesex: Porthill Publishers. ISBN 1-870732-31-6.
- Pavle Ivić, ed. (1995) [1981]. "Serbian Art in the Nineteenth Century". The History of Serbian Culture. Translated by Randall A. Major (English translation ed.). Edgware, Middlesex: Porthill Publishers. ISBN 1-870732-31-6.
- Serbs in Vienna (in Serbian). 1998.
- Dunav, reka jedinstva Evrope (in Serbian). Prometej. 1998.
- Izabrane srpske teme I-V (in Serbian). 1998.
- Sveta gora fruškogorska (in Serbian). 1998.
- Otkrivanje Hilandara (in Serbian). 2001.
- Joseph II und die Serben (in Serbian) (German translation ed.). Prometej. 2001.
- Serben in Wien (Serbs in Vienna) (German translation ed.). Prometej. 2001. ISBN 86-7639-546-2.
- Die Donau (in Serbian) (German translation ed.). Prometej. 2001.
- Serbs in Zagreb (in Serbian). Prometej. 2004.

=== Books of poetry ===
- Motivi (in Serbian). 1946.
- Kamenovi (in Serbian). 1966.
- Umir (in Serbian). 1987.
- Niska (in Serbian). 1989.
- Znak na kamenu (in Serbian). 1994.
- Zaveštanje (in Serbian). 1995.
- Sve čudnije je čudno (in Serbian). Prometej. 2000.

=== Books of short stories ===
- Povratak u Rakitije (in Serbian).
- Ptice (in Serbian).
- Orlov let (in Serbian).
- Parastost u Sremskim Karlovcima (in Serbian).
- Lumen Karlovačke gimnazije (in Serbian).

=== Other works ===
Memoirs, autobiographical prose, letters, speeches:

- Svedočenja (in Serbian). 1984.
- Ephemeris: chronique d'une famille (Ephemeris I) (in French). Lausanne: Age d'homme. 1995.
- Traženje dobra (in Serbian). 1995.
- Pisma (in Serbian). 1996.
- Ephemeris I-V (in Serbian). Belgrade: Beogradski izdavacko-graficki zavod. 1998.
- Suočavanje sa ljudima i vremenom (in Serbian). 2000.
- Pisma i govori (in Serbian). Prometej. 2004.
- Dani, sećanja I-VIII (in Serbian). 1996–2006.

Academic offices
Preceded by Aleksandar Despić	President of Serbian Academy of Sciences and Arts; 1999–2003	Succeeded by Nikola Hajdin
