= Jugoslavenska Banka =

Bank in interwar Yugoslavia

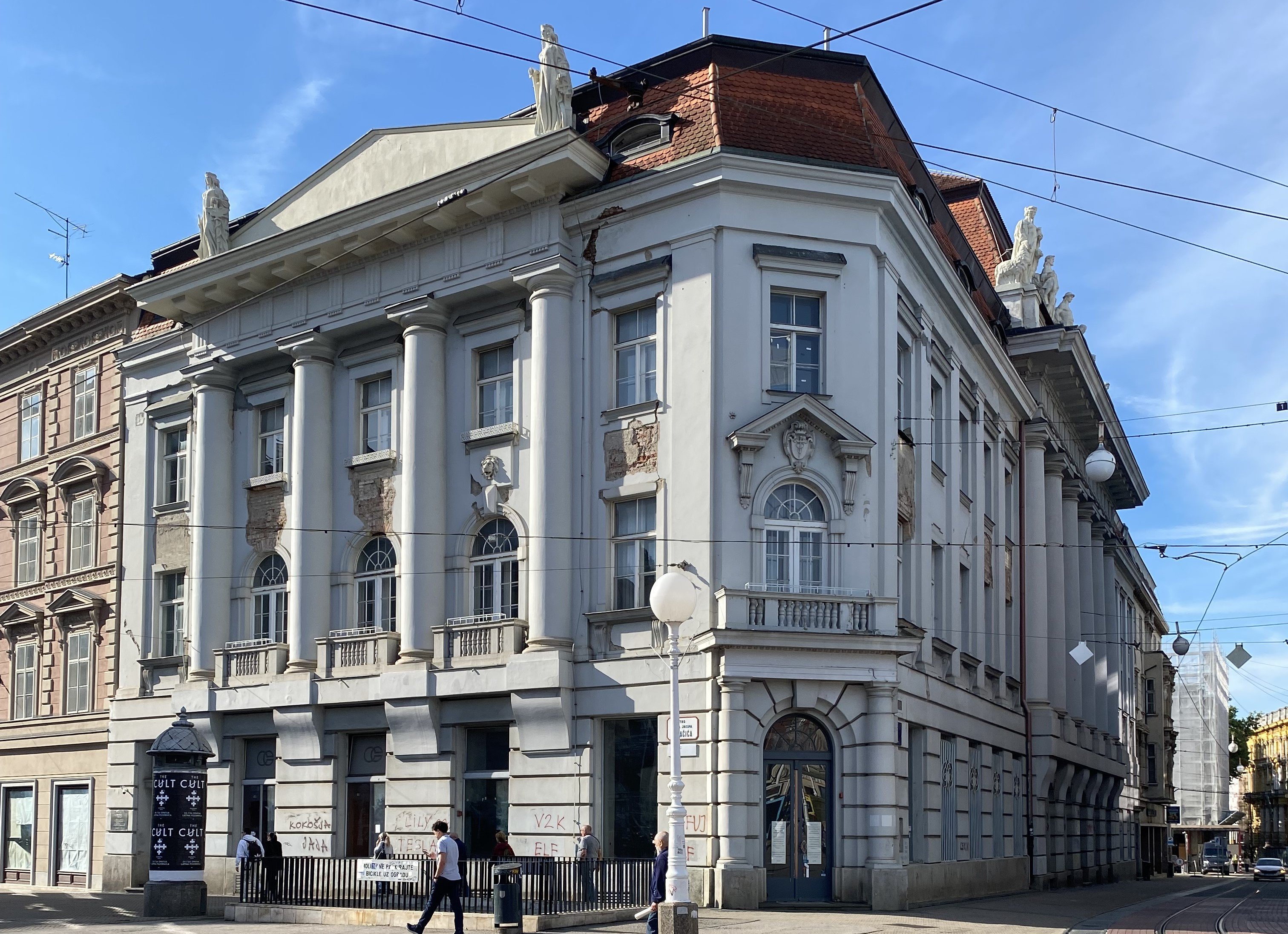
Former head office of Jugoslavenska Banka on Ban Jelačić Square in Zagreb, built 1920–1926 on a design by architect Ignjat Fischer with sculptures by Rudolf Valdec

Jugoslavenska Banka (lit. 'Yugoslav Bank') was a significant bank in the Kingdom of Yugoslavia during the interwar period. It was founded in Osijek in 1909 as the Croatian Landesbank (Croatian: Hrvatska zemaljska banka, German: Kroatische Landesbank), and in 1920 relocated to Zagreb and changed its name to Jugoslavenska Banka. Again renamed Croatian Landesbank in 1941, it was liquidated in late 1945.

== History ==
The creation of the Croatian Landesbank was sponsored in 1909 by Prague-based Živnostenská Banka, in line with its strategy of expansion into the Slavic-speaking lands of the Habsburg monarchy, and took over the prior local business of Sorger, Weiszmayer & Cie whose eponymous partners became shareholders in the new privately held venture together with Živnostenská. In 1912, it acquired the Agrarian Savings Bank (Hungarian: Földmivelk Takarékpénztára Reazvénytársaság) in Subotica. In May 1914, it took over the Zagreb-headquartered Hrvatska pučka banka (lit. 'Croatian Popular Bank'). Meanwhile, it established branches in Belgrade, Ljubljana, Ogulin (1912), Crikvenica, (1914), Karlovac (1919), Novi Sad, Varaždin, and Vukovar (1920).

In 1919, the bank was implicated in alleged smuggling of Austro-Hungarian krone banknotes printed in Hungary to arbitrage the favorable conditions for conversion to Yugoslav dinars offered by the National Bank of the Kingdom of Serbs, Croats and Slovenes. To preempt litigation, the bank initiated a restructuring that included its change of name, relocation (by which the former Zagreb branch became the head office, and the former head office in Osijek was turned into a branch), and severing of the prior government role in its governance, which was completed on 30 May 1920. The move was masterminded by financier Dušan Plavšić, who became the bank's head and also took over the operations of another bank that was liquidated in 1923, the Zagreb-based Balkan Bank (Croatian: Balkanska banka). By 1924, it had added branches in Novi Vinodolski, Osijek, Slavonski Brod, Subotica, and Sušak.

The Jugoslavenska Banka suffered during the European banking crisis of 1931, had to close branches, and in 1935 was restructured by Plavšić, by then an official at the finance ministry. On that occasion, the Brno branch of Živnostenská Banka participated in a capital injection and allowed the reopening of branches in Belgrade, Novi Sad, Osijek, Ljubljana, Karlovac, Crikvenica, and Sušak. Its moratorium on most liabilities only ended in 1940.

Following the invasion of Yugoslavia and proclamation of the Independent State of Croatia, Jugoslavenska Banka reverted to its original name of Croatian Landesbank by court order of 3 June 1941, with 53 percent of its share capital taken over by Dresdner Bank, while Živnostenská Banka retained a minority stake of 25 percent. Following the war's end, the bank was liquidated in mid-November 1945 by the National Bank of Yugoslavia, together with the entire banking sector of Yugoslavia.

== See also ==
- Landesbank
- List of banks in Croatia
- List of banks in Yugoslavia
