= Vladimir Matijević =

Serbian businessman and philanthropist

- Владимир Матијевић
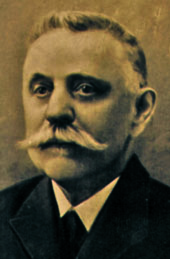
- Born: 3 August 1854; Gornji Budački near Krnjak, Austrian Empire
- Died: 7 September 1929 (aged 75); Belgrade, Kingdom of Serbs, Croats and Slovenes
- Citizenship: Austrian Empire (1854–1867); Austria-Hungary (1867–1918); Kingdom of Serbs, Croats and Slovenes (1918–1929)
- Spouse: Paulina Matijević

Vladimir Matijević (Serbian Cyrillic: Владимир Матијевић; 3 August 1854 – 7 September 1929) was a Serbian businessman and philanthropist.

== Biography ==
He was born in Kordun's Gornji Budački near Krnjak, at the time in the Austrian Empire. In Karlovac, he received his primary education before entering the a military cadet school in Turanj, Karlovac, but then went back to civil school, and later enrolled in the Gymnasium Karlovac and after that at the Vienna School of Commerce. There he graduated with a Bachelor of Commerce. Upon his return from Vienna, he dedicated himself to commerce and took over the firm "Gustaf Saher" in Zagreb. In 1876 he joined the Serbian Army as a volunteer at the outbreak of the Serbian-Turkish Wars. In 1895 he founded the Serbian Bank in Zagreb in order that the Serbian privrednici could access funds in a timely manner without obstructions.

He was also the founder of the Serbian Business Association Privrednik (1897) and the Union of Agricultural Cooperatives. Privrednik is an organization of the Serb minority in Croatia, which is aimed to creating and increasing economic opportunities in rural areas where the majority of Serbs live in Croatia, as well as the development of professional skills of individuals.

After the Great War, once the Kingdom of Serbs, Croats, and Slovenes was well established, in 1922, Vladimir Matijević moved his business to Belgrade and in 1923 founded the Serbian Privrednik or Zadruga Srba privrednika there.

He died in Belgrade on 7 September 1929.

== See also ==
- Lazar Bačić
- Aleksa Spasić
