= Privrednik =

Organization of Serb minority in Croatia

Srpsko privredno društvo "Privrednik"
- Abbreviation: SPD Privrednik
- Formation: 1897; 129 years ago
- Founder: Vladimir Matijević
- Type: Nonprofit
- Legal status: NGO
- Headquarters: Zagreb, Croatia
- Coordinates: 45°48′33″N 15°58′43″E
- Region served: Croatia
- Official language: Croatian, Serbian
- President: Nikola Lunić
- Website: www.privrednik.hr

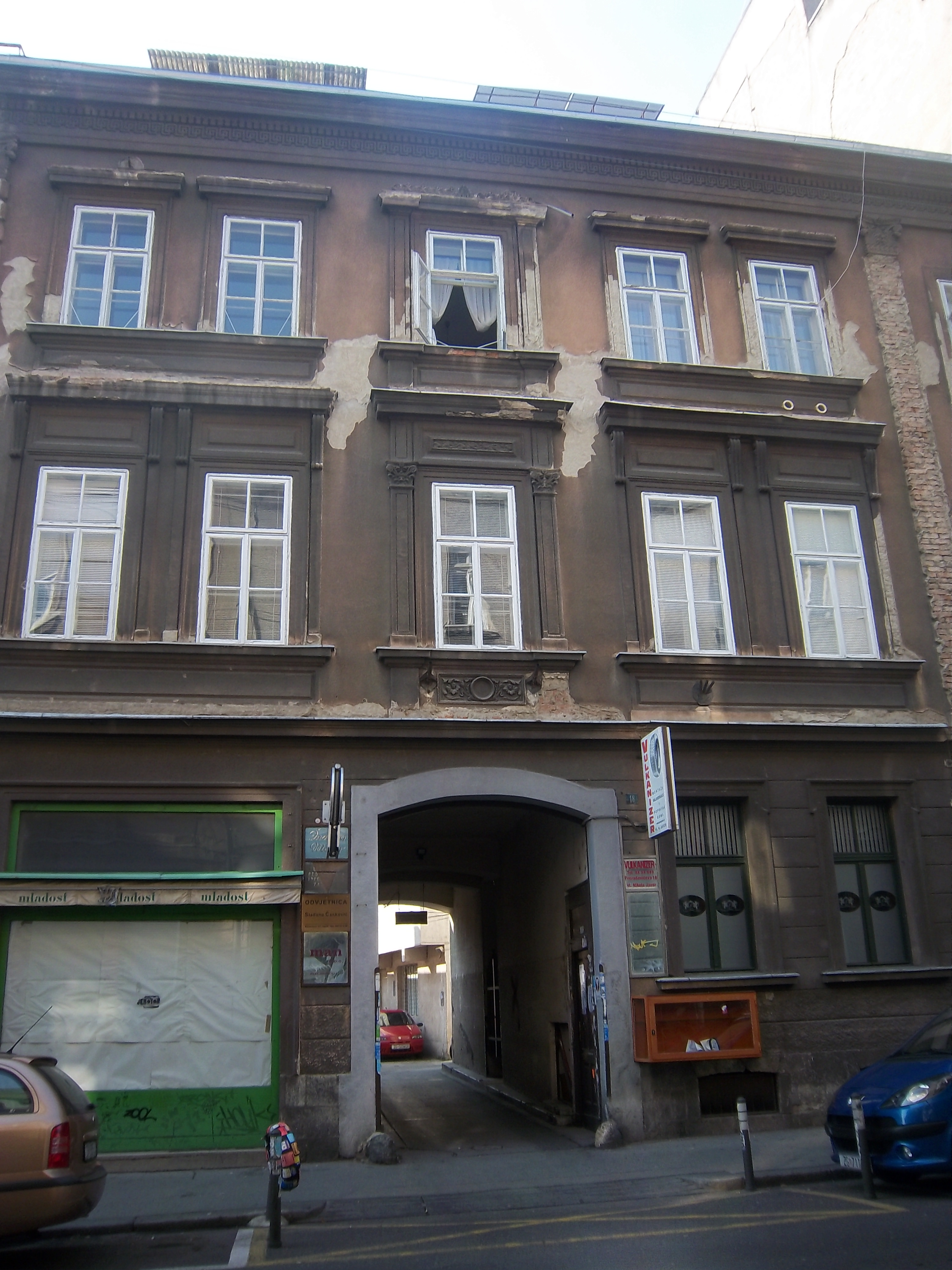
Privrednik headquarters

Srpsko privredno društvo "Privrednik" (Serbian Cyrillic: Српско привредно друштво "Привредник"; English: Serbian Business Association "Privrednik"), commonly referred to as Privrednik, is an organization of the Serb minority in Croatia, which is aimed to creating and increasing economic opportunities in rural areas where majority of Serbs live in Croatia, as well as development of professional skills of individuals. Vladimir Matijević founded Privrednik under Austria-Hungary rule and after the Great War when the Kingdom of Serbs, Croats, and Slovenes was established he moved his business from Zagreb to Belgrade where he founded Zadruga Srba privrednika in 1923.

Privrednik is a registered nongovernmental, nonprofit, and nonpartisan organization.

== History ==
Undoubtedly, the Privrednik Society was the fulfillment of Matijević's goal, based on an ideal he himself expressed, "The greatest deed is to give a man honest work and pay."

Matijević's ultimate purpose was to establish an efficient organization — Privrednik — to identify talented children (boys and girls) from poor Serbian families in Dalmatia, Lika, Kordun, Banija, Baranja, Slavonia, Bosnia, Herzegovina and Vojvodina and to support their education and training in the trades and in business.

After they were trained, it was Matijević's hope that they would open their own shops and businesses and thus carry forward the means by which their people could progress culturally and socially.

By design, the students were to be from poor families. And also by design, they had to be capable and ready to learn.

Privrednik's first president was Isidor Dobrović from Daruvar. The vice-presidents were Vladimir Matijević and Nikola Ćuk, a successful wine merchant. The secretary was Ljubomir P. Ristić. All were dedicated to the goals of the society and were great benefactors, and in the first year, 1897, they registered and placed 207 students.

Although the society operated with great success, it also faced several extraordinary crises between 1897 and 1947. Apparently Privrednik'sprogress aroused the authorities' suspicions as Austria-Hungary became more fearful of its Serbs.

In 1902, an angry mob attacked some of the houses of Privrednik's officers and the shops where some of the apprentices worked. During the World War I, the Austro-Hungarian government closed down the society and arrested many of the officers for treason. Matijević, nearly fifty years old at the time, managed somehow to escape to Switzerland.

In 1923, after the formation of the Kingdom of Yugoslavia, Privrednikopened a new headquarters in Belgrade while maintaining its offices in Zagreb's Preradović Street. Six years later, Matijević died from complications of influenza. He was 75.

Major problems for Privrednik arose in Zagreb at the beginning of World War II in April 1941. Under the government of the Croatian fascist party, the Ustashi, Privrednik was closed, and the society was banned.

Following the war, the Communist government of Yugoslavia began a program of free public education and closed former private schools (even though they were non-profit and funded by wealthy merchants), including the Privrednik program. The society's considerable property — including Matijević's entire estate, valued at $7 million in 1929 — was expropriated by the Communists. Included in the society's holdings were houses and land in Zagreb, and also in several other cities — Sombor, Slavonski Brod, Daruvar, Rijeka, Gospić, Pakrac, and Osijek.

From its earliest beginning in 1897 until the "government expropriation" in 1947, the society organized and supported the training and education of almost 40,000 students. As a result, those who completed the program became tradesmen and businessmen, members of a new middle class.

== Organization ==
Programmatic and organizational activities of the "Privrednik" are divided into:

1. Funds for Scholarships
2. Economic Development Department
3. Youth Department
4. Media Production Department

Privrednik has two funds from which awards scholarships Vladimir Matijević Fund and the Ivana Vujnović Fund. Matijevic Fund scholarships provide grants for high school and university students from families of lower-income families. Vujnović Fund scholarships, excellent university students.

Economic Development Department provides support to the sector of small and medium-sized businesses, primarily public information, promotional and advisory services, implementation of development projects in order to influence the reconstruction and development of less developed areas where predominantly Serbs lived in Croatia.

Media Production Department includes a media presentation of the Privrednik, its mission, and its programmatic activities, but also informs and connects users to the activities of Privrednik. Privrednik issues the Privrednik Magazine, which comes out once a month, every first Friday of the month.

== See also ==
- Serbs of Croatia
- Serbs of Zagreb
- Lazar Bačić
