= Ravishankar Dakoju =

Indian philanthropist and real estate investor

- Born: 6 June 1953 (age 73); Bangalore
- Education: The National College, Bangalore
- Spouse: Paola Ravishankar
- Children: Ektaa and Samta
- Parent(s): Kamesh Dakoju and Indira Kamesh
- Website: ravishankardakoju.com

Ravishankar Dakoju (born 6 June 1953) is an Indian philanthropist and real estate investor. During 2018–19 he was the president of Rotary Bangalore Orchards, a charitable trust instituted under Rotary International. In 2018, he became the first Indian national to announce the single largest community development fund from India to Rotary Foundation at INR 100 Crores (USD 14.7 million). It is the second single largest contribution to The Rotary Foundation after the Bill & Melinda Gates Foundation. He is currently a member of the Rotary Club of Bangalore. He is also the founder and managing director of Hara Housing and Land Development Company, a real estate development company based in Bangalore, India.

== Personal life and education ==
Ravishankar was born in Bangalore in 1953 to Kamesh Dakoju and Indira Kamesh as the sixth among seven children. He is a BA Graduate and has a Diploma in Business Administration & Marketing Management. Ravishankar is married to Paola Ravishankar. They have two daughters, Ektaa and Samta.

== Philanthropy ==
Ravishankar has focused his philanthropic work on areas like community development, education, health, sanitation, orphans, senior citizens, tree plantation, animal welfare, lake rejuvenation, and support to physically challenged. He has worked on numerous projects in the North Eastern States like Manipur and Mizoram. Through the Paola Dakoju Ravishankar Foundation, he has completed the construction of a water storage tank with 77,500L capacity at Ijorong, Inpue District, Manipur. The Foundation has also built the Lyzon Friendship School in Khomunnom Village, Churachandpur District, Manipur, for 350 students. The Sunbird Ravishankar Farming Knowledge Centre is being built in partnership with the Sunbird Trust at Ijorong.
