= Kalyan Banerjee (Rotary International) =

President of Rotary International

- Born: 1942 (age 83–84); Calcutta, British India
- Education: Vishwa Bharati, Scindia School, Indian Institute of Technology Kharagpur
- Occupation: Chemical Engineer
- Organization: United Phosphorus Limited
- Known for: President, Rotary International, 2011-2013
- Spouse: Binota
- Website: www.kalyanbanerjee.com

Kalyan Banerjee (born 1942) is an Indian humanitarian, who served as the 101st President of Rotary International, for the year 2011–2012. He took office on 1 July 2011 from Ray Klinginsmith.

== Career ==
He is Rotary International's third President from India, the third largest contributor to The Rotary Foundation.

He is a director of United Phosphorus Limited, the largest agrochemical manufacturer of India, and the chairman of United Phosphorus (Bangladesh) Limited. He is a member of the Indian Institute of Chemical Engineers and the American Chemical Society. He has been president of Vapi Industries Association and chairman of the Gujarat chapter of the Confederation of Indian Industry (CII).

== Personal life ==
Banerjee is based in Vapi. He is married to Binota, and the couple have two children and four grandchildren.

Preceded by Ray Klinginsmith	President of Rotary International; 2011-2012	Succeeded by Sakuji Tanaka
