= John Hewko =

American executive and lawyer, Chief Executive of Rotary International

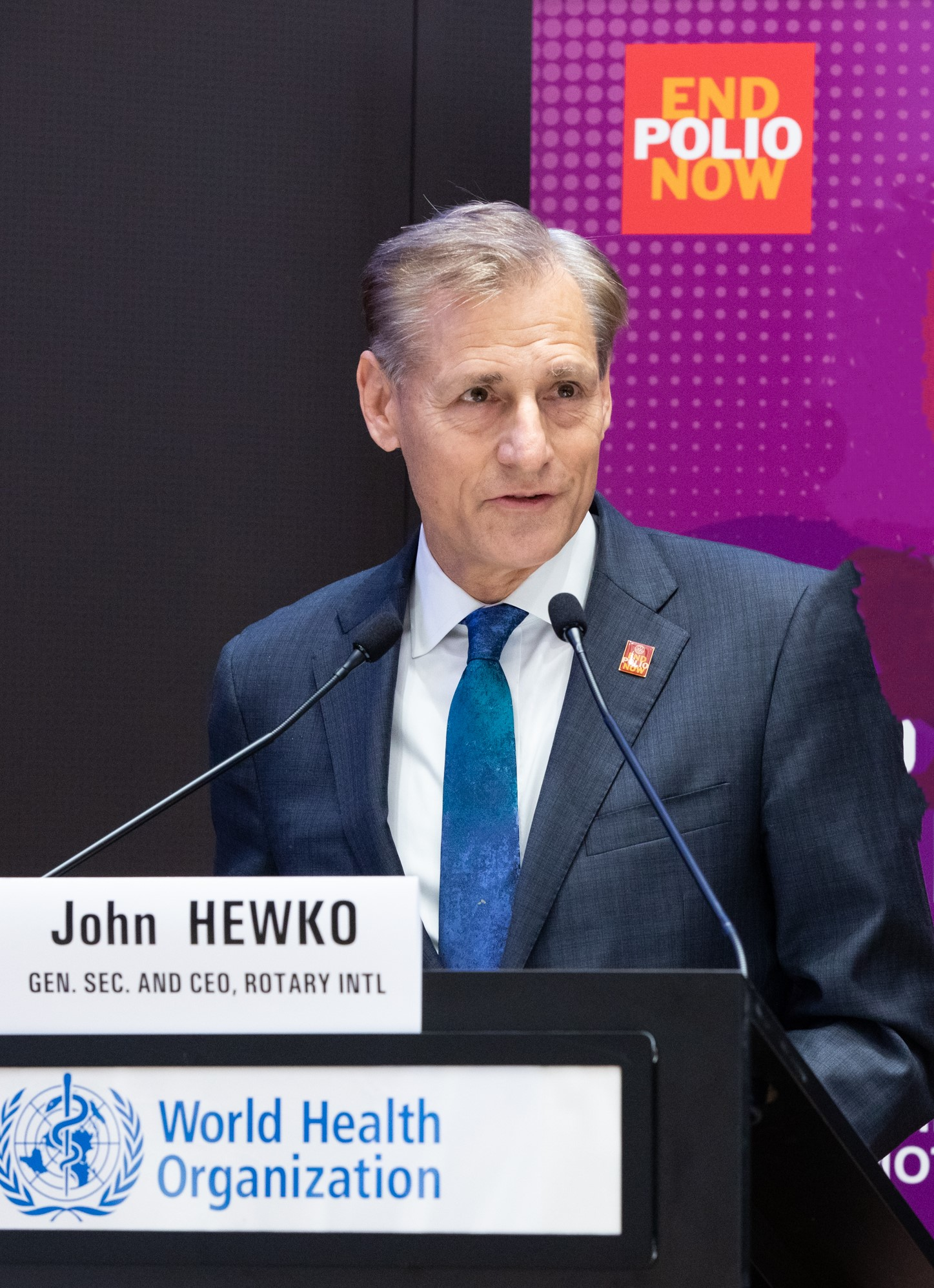
- Hewko in October 2022
- Born: 1957 (age 67–68); Detroit, Michigan, US
- Education: Hamilton College; Oxford University; Harvard University
- Occupation(s): Lawyer, public policy scholar
- Employers: Rotary International; The Rotary Foundation
- Spouse: Margarita Hewko
- Children: 1

John Hewko is an American lawyer and public policy scholar who is the current General Secretary and Chief Executive Officer of Rotary International and The Rotary Foundation.

== Career ==
Hewko worked for the Chicago-based law firm Baker McKenzie from 1989 to 2004, where he helped establish the firm’s Moscow office, and then served as managing partner in Kyiv and Prague. During that period, from 1991 to 1992, he also worked as the executive secretary of the International Advisory Council to the Ukrainian Parliament in Kyiv. He assisted the parliamentary commission that prepared the initial draft of the Ukrainian Constitution and was a member of the working groups that drafted the initial Ukrainian post-independence laws on foreign investment, anti-competition, and corporations.

Between 2004 and 2009, Hewko worked as the vice-president for Operations and Compact Development for the Millennium Challenge Corporation where he completed the negotiation of foreign assistance agreements with 18 countries totalling $6.3 billion for infrastructure, agriculture, water and sanitation, health and education projects. He has also been a non-resident senior associate at the Carnegie Endowment's Democracy and Rule of Law Program, a public policy scholar at the Woodrow Wilson International Center for Scholars, and an adjunct professor of law at Georgetown University. In 2011, he was appointed general secretary and CEO of Rotary International. He holds an undergraduate degree from Hamilton College, New York, a master's degree from Oxford University, where he studied as a Marshall Scholar, and a Juris Doctor degree from Harvard University.

== Personal life ==
Hewko is the son of Ukrainian immigrants, who moved to the United States in 1949 after four years in German displaced persons camps. He lives with his wife, Marga, in Evanston, Illinois.
