= Anne L. Matthews =

Woman vice president international voluntary organisation

- Known for: First woman vice-president of Rotary International, 2013–2014

Anne L. Matthews from South Carolina, USA, was the first woman to be vice-president of Rotary International, in 2013–2014.

Matthews was educated in business, economics and education, gaining a doctorate from University of South Carolina. She taught business subjects from school to university level and was president of an educational consulting firm. She has also been very active within the Rotary movement. Rotary International, descended from the Rotary Club founded in 1905, allowed women to be members from 1989. They gradually moved into senior positions within the organisation. From 2013 to 2014, Matthews was the first woman to serve as a vice-president of Rotary International. Matthews has chaired Rotary's the Polio Advocacy Task Force for the United States and has appeared before the US Labor, Health and Human Services, Education, and Related Programs Appropriation Subcommittee.
