= Sylvia Whitlock =

American humanitarian

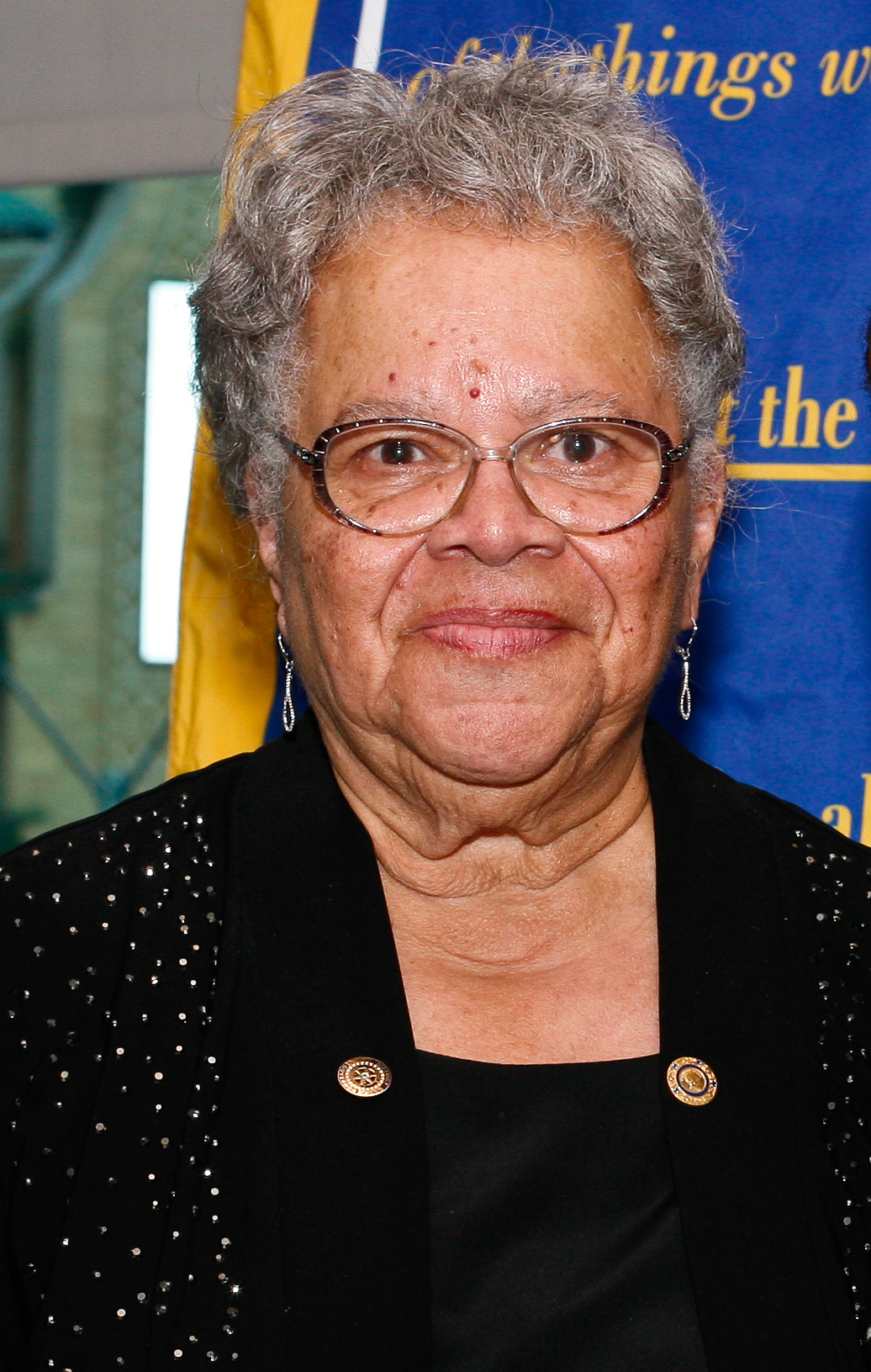
Sylvia Whitlock at a Rotary event

Sylvia Whitlock is an American humanitarian who was the first woman to serve as president of a Rotary Club.

== Early life and education ==
Sylvia Whitlock was born in New York City and educated in Kingston, Jamaica. She returned to New York City after high school and earned a B.A. in Psychology from Hunter College. She later moved to California where she earned a master's degree in Education from Cal Poly, Pomona and a Ph.D. in education from Claremont Graduate School. Whitlock earned another master's degree in Marriage and Family Therapy from Azusa Pacific University.

== Career ==
Whitlock worked as a Statistical Clerk for the United Nations before moving to California to pursue a career in Education. She became an elementary school principal in Duarte, CA in 1982. She served as an educator for forty years before beginning a second career as a therapist.

== Rotary Club of Duarte ==
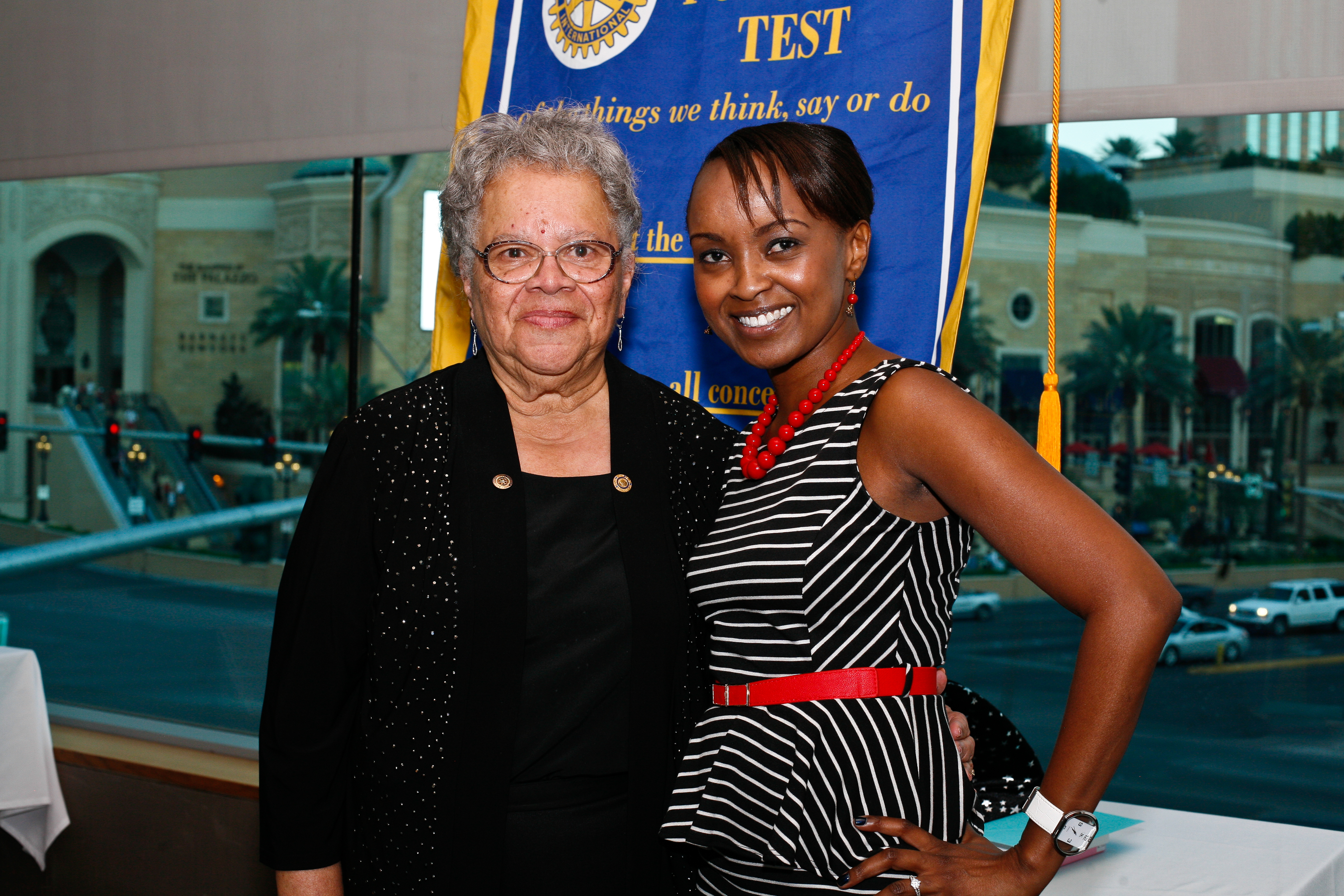
Dr. Sylvia Whitlock (left), Rotary International event, September 17, 2012

In 1987, Whitlock became president of the Rotary Club of Duarte making her the first woman to hold such a position within Rotary International. The chapter's charter had previously been revoked in 1978 after they violated Rotary International policy by admitting women. The Duarte club filed suit in the California courts claiming that Rotary Clubs are business establishments subject to regulation under California's Unruh Civil Rights Act, a law that bans discrimination based on race, gender, religion or ethnic origin. Rotary International appealed the decision to the U.S. Supreme Court. On May 4, 1987, the United States Supreme Court confirmed the Californian decision supporting women, in the case Board of Directors, Rotary International v. Rotary Club of Duarte. After the ruling, Rotary International ended their policy of gender restrictions.

== Humanitarianism ==
Whitlock supports a number of charitable causes. She previously established an AIDS clinic in Jamaica and continues to support the Piyali Girls School near Calcutta, India.
