= Jennifer E. Jones =

Canadian communications executive

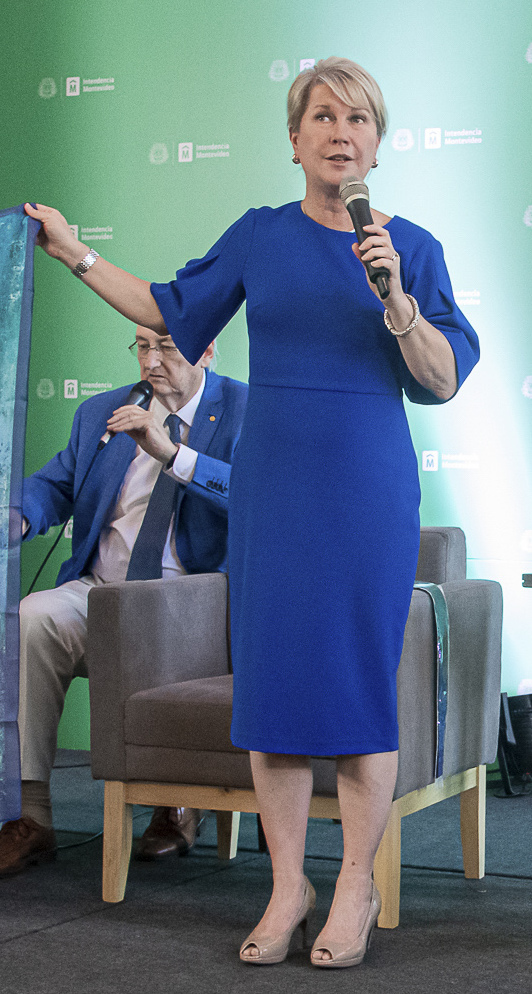
- Known for: First woman to be elected President of Rotary International

Jennifer E. Jones (born 1967) is a Canadian communications executive. She was president of Rotary International for 2022–23, the first woman to be selected in the 117-year history of the organization.

== Life ==
Jones first experienced a Rotary meeting when only men were allowed to join. She was working as a reporter in the 1980s and she would attend meetings as a guest so that she could report on them. It took a High Court ruling for Rotary to accept women members and she joined in 1996.

Jones had previously served as Rotary International vice president, director, training leader, committee chair, moderator and district governor. She said one of her goals as Rotary International president is to have double-digit growth in the number of female Rotarians and Rotarians under the age of 40.

Jones also said she is extremely proud of the work Rotary has done in response to the COVID-19 pandemic, providing $29.7 million to help local clubs respond.

Jones is the founder and president of Media Street Productions in Windsor, Ontario. She expects to leave daily operations of that company in the hands of Media Street CEO Kelly Blais while she and her husband, Nick Krayacich, live near the Rotary International headquarters in Evanston, Illinois.

Jones is a member of the Rotary Club of Windsor-Roseland.
