= Sakuji Tanaka =

- Organization: Rotary International
- Known for: Social work
- Predecessor: Kalyan Banerjee
- Successor: Ron D. Burton
- Spouse: Kyoko
- Children: Three

Sakuji Tanaka was the President of Rotary International. He has served as the Chairman of the Daika Company and President of the National Household Papers Distribution Association of Japan.

Tanaka served as the President of Rotary International from 2012 to 2013.

Sakuji is married to Kyoko and they have three children.

== Notes ==
Preceded by Kalyan Banerjee	President of Rotary International; 2012-2013	Succeeded by Ron D. Burton
