= Ray Klinginsmith =

Former President of Rotary International

- Education: University of Cape Town
- Organization: Rotary International
- Known for: Social work
- Title: World President
- Term: 2010-2011
- Predecessor: John Kenny
- Successor: Kalyan Banerjee

Ray Klinginsmith is a social activist fighting for the rights of the disabled, and is the former World President of Rotary International.

== Notes ==
Preceded by John Kenny	President of Rotary International; 2010-2011	Succeeded by Kalyan Banerjee
