= Marylin Burke =

American author

Marylin C. Burke
- Other names: Marilyn Burke; Marylin C. Burke
- Occupations: Author and secretary

Marylin C. Burke (15 Mar 1922–26 Oct 1996) was executive secretary to Dale and Dorothy Carnegie. She was allowed to accompany Dale Carnegie to the (usually) all-male meeting of the Brooklyn Rotary Club in 1955.

Born in Medford, Massachusetts, Marylin Irene Coney was the daughter of Donald Ira Coney and Ada May Martin; however, by 1941, she had changed her last name to that of her mother's second husband, James J. Burke. She graduated from The Bryant & Stratton Commercial School in Boston and worked as a stenographer before being hired as author Dale Carnegie's secretary in 1950. After six years, she became the secretary for his wife, Dorothy.

Burke wrote The Executive Secretary: Techniques for Success in a Secretarial Career (Doubleday, New York, 216pp), a guidebook published in 1959 that cautions against demonstrations of female sexuality in the office, as well as offering practical tips for women who had the determination and drive to go from the steno pool to the personal secretaries of CEOs.

Burke married twice: first to Robert W. Seely, with whom she had three children. After she was widowed in 1993, Burke married John W. Utterback.

She died on 26 October 1996 in a hospital in Waynesboro, PA.
