= Rotary International =

American nonprofit service organization

- Brand adopted since 2013, with the Rotary wheel together with the word "Rotary"

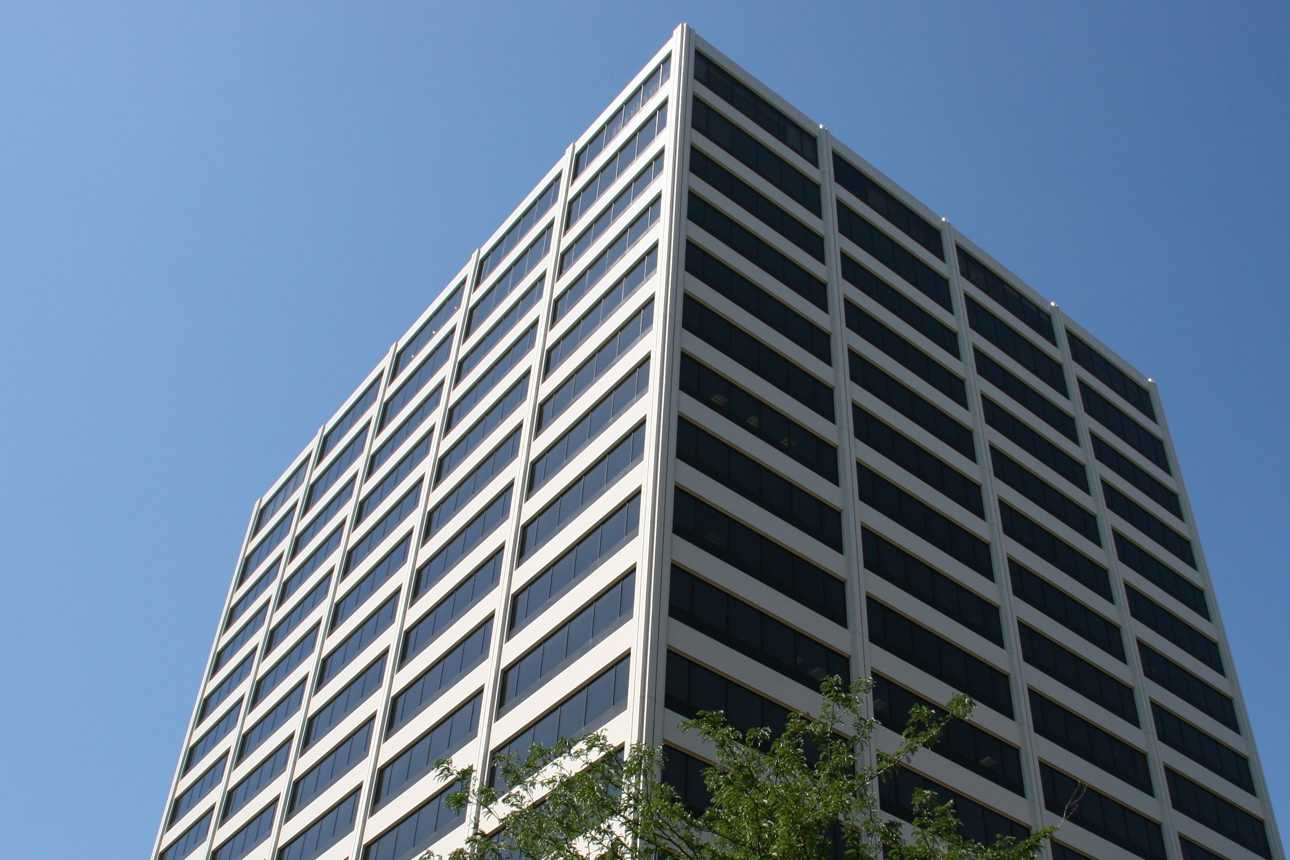
- Headquarters in Evanston, Illinois
- Formation: February 23, 1905; 121 years ago
- Founder: Paul P. Harris
- Type: Service club
- Headquarters: Evanston, Illinois, U.S.
- Location: Global
- Members: 1.24 million
- Official language: English, French, German, Italian, Japanese, Korean, Portuguese, Spanish
- Key people: Francesco Arezzo (President); John Hewko (CEO & General Secretary)
- Publication: Rotary Magazine
- Volunteers: 1,165,554 Rotarions (142,506 Interactors)
- Website: www.rotary.org

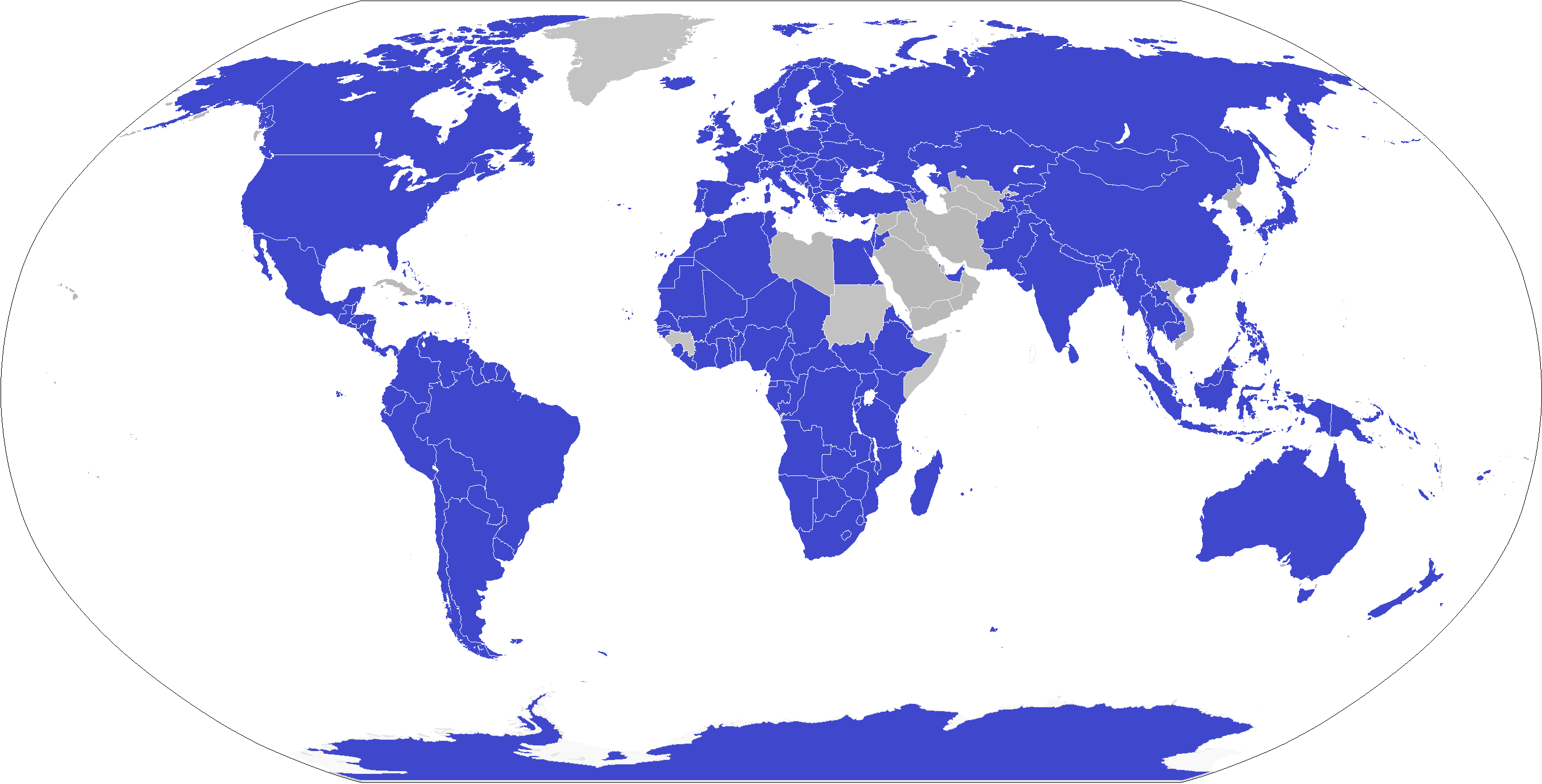
Map of the presence of Rotary International

Rotary International is a global service organization, headquartered in Evanston, Illinois, that is one of the largest service organizations in the world. The self-declared mission of Rotary, as stated on its website, is to "provide service to others, promote integrity, and advance world understanding, goodwill, and peace through fellowship of business, professional, and community leaders". It is a non-political and non-religious organization. Membership is by application or invitation and based on various social factors. As of 2026, there are over 45,000 member clubs worldwide, with a membership of 1.2 million individuals, known as Rotarians.

Rotary International is the organization of service clubs with the largest membership in the world, with 1.9 million volunteers, including all the members of clubs that make up the Rotary family, namely Rotary, Interact and Rotaract clubs.

== History ==
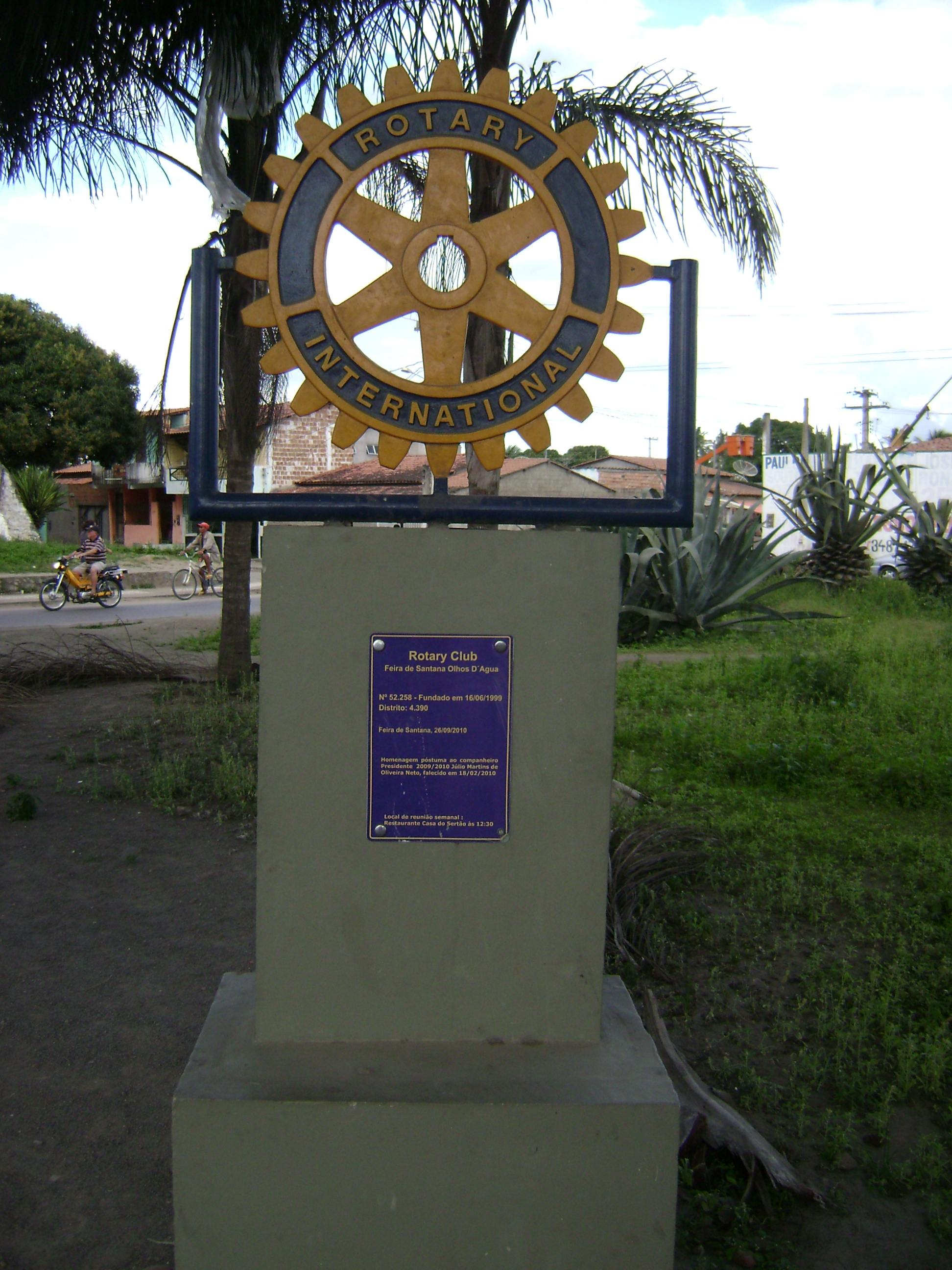
Rotary monument in Feira de Santana, Brazil

=== Early years ===
The first Rotary Club was formed when attorney Paul P. Harris called together a meeting of three business acquaintances in downtown Chicago, Illinois, at Harris's friend Gustave Loehr's office in the Unity Building on Dearborn Street on February 23, 1905. In addition to Harris and Loehr (a mining engineer and freemason), Silvester Schiele (a coal merchant), and Hiram E. Shorey (a tailor) were the other two who attended this first meeting. The members chose the name Rotary because initially they rotated subsequent weekly club meetings to each other's offices, although within a year, the Chicago club became so large it became necessary to adopt the now-common practice of a regular meeting place.

The next four Rotary Clubs were organized in cities in the western United States, beginning with San Francisco, then Oakland, Seattle, and Los Angeles. The National Association of Rotary Clubs in America was formed in 1910. On November 3, 1910, a Rotary club began meeting in Winnipeg, Manitoba, Canada, marking the beginning of Rotary as an international organization. On February 22, 1911, the first meeting of the Rotary Club Dublin was held in Dublin, Ireland. This was the first club established outside of North America. In April 1912, the Winnipeg club was chartered, marking the first official establishment of an American-style service club outside the United States. To reflect the addition of a club outside of the United States, the name was changed to the International Association of Rotary Clubs in 1912.

In August 1912, the Rotary Club of London received its charter from the Association, marking the first acknowledged Rotary club outside North America. It later became known that the Dublin club in Ireland was organized before the London club, but the Dublin club did not receive its charter until after the London club was chartered. During World War I, Rotary in Britain increased from 9 to 22 clubs, and other early clubs in other nations included those in Cuba in 1916, the Philippines in 1919 and India in 1920.

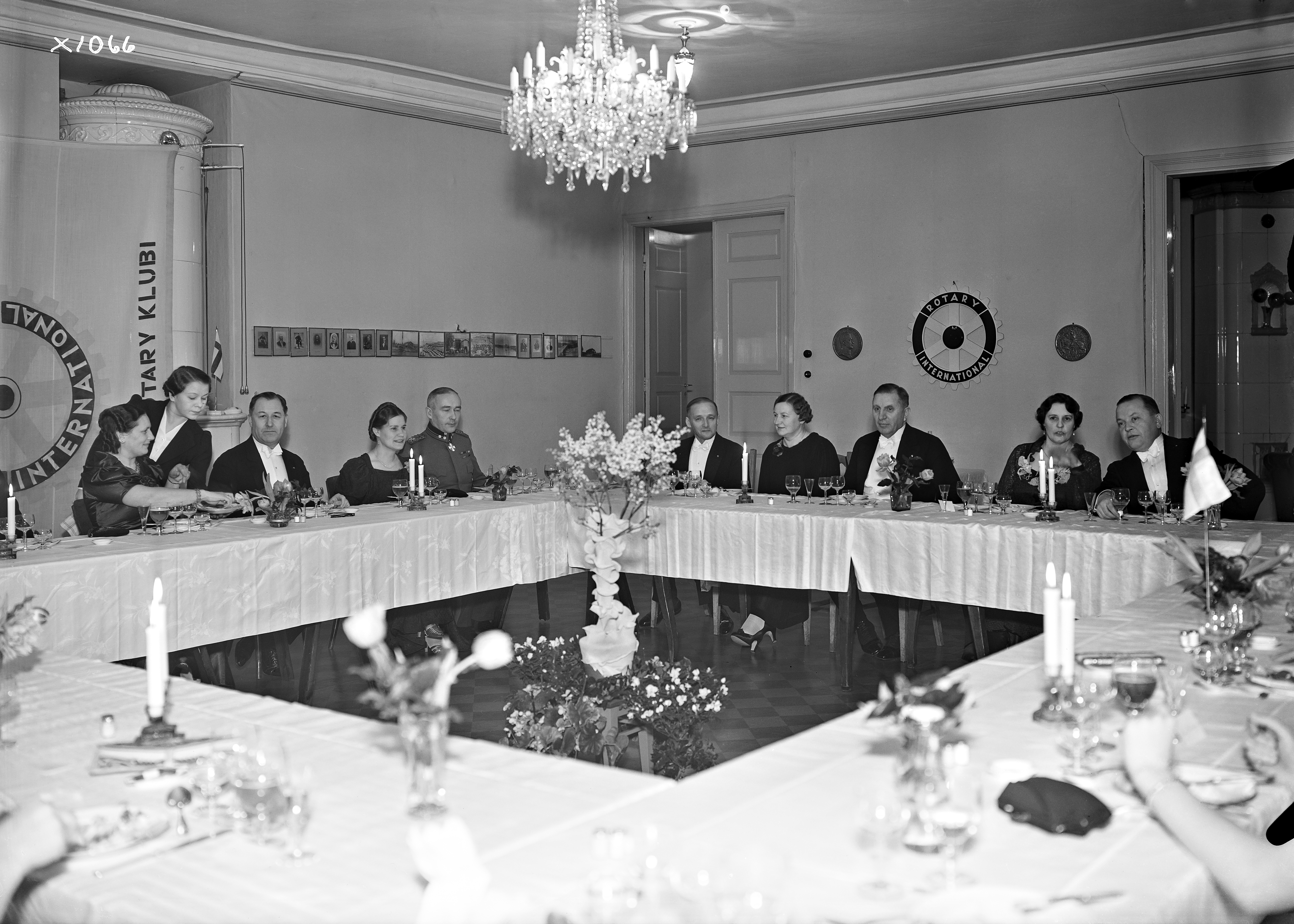
A dinner of the Rotary Club of Oulu in January 1937

In 1922, the name was changed to Rotary International. From 1923 to 1928, Rotary's office and headquarters were located on E 20th Street (now E Cullerton Street) in the Atwell Building. During this same time, the monthly magazine The Rotarian was published mere floors below by Atwell Printing and Binding Company. By 1925, Rotary had grown to 200 clubs with more than 20,000 members. During the 1930s there was an expanding conflict in Asia between Japan and China and the fear of a confrontation between Japan and the United States. In hopes of helping resolve these issues, a leading Japanese international statesman, Prince Iyesato Tokugawa, was chosen as the Honorary Keynote Speaker at Rotary's 25th Anniversary Convention held in 1930 in Chicago. Prince Tokugawa held the position of president of Japan's upper house of congress, the National Diet, for 30 years. Tokugawa promoted democratic principles and international goodwill. It was only after his death in 1940 that Japanese militants were able to push Japan into joining the Axis Powers in WWII.

=== World War II era in Europe ===
Rotary Clubs in Spain ceased to operate shortly after the outbreak of the Spanish Civil War.

Clubs were disbanded across Europe as follows:

- Germany and Austria (1938)
- Italy (1939)
- Czechoslovakia (1940)
- Estonia, Latvia, Lithuania, Poland, Yugoslavia and Luxembourg (1941)
- Hungary (1941/1942)

Rotary International has worked with the UN since the UN started in 1945. At that time Rotary was involved in 65 countries. The two organizations shared ideals around promoting peace. Rotary received consultative status at the UN in 1946–47.

During the Third Reich, Rotary Clubs were grouped with Freemasonry as secret societies associated with Jews, and Nazi officials were banned from joining them. This was reversed in July 1933 after appeals but the club was forced to ban all Jews from membership. This led to several non-Jews quitting in solidarity. In order to survive, the members tried to show their loyalty to the Nazi leadership, inviting government officials and high-standing businesspeople. These included Hermann Schlosser, a business manager for Degesch – which supplied Zyklon B for use at death camps such as Auschwitz-Birkenau. After 1945, the Rotary club tried to control the damage by preventing members such as Hans Globke and Wolfgang A. Wick from being appointed presidents.

=== From 1945 onward ===
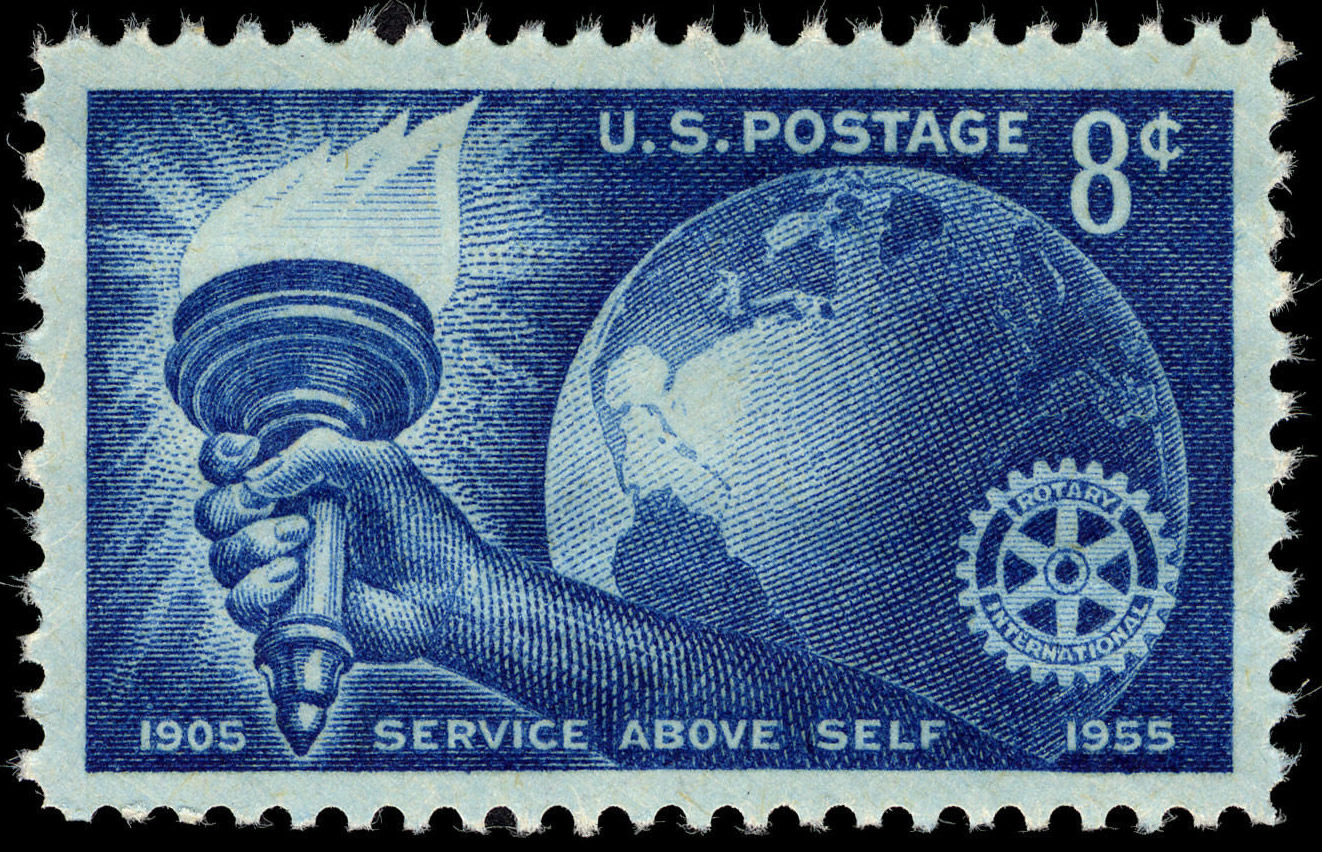
U.S. stamp commemorating Rotary International's 50th anniversary in 1955

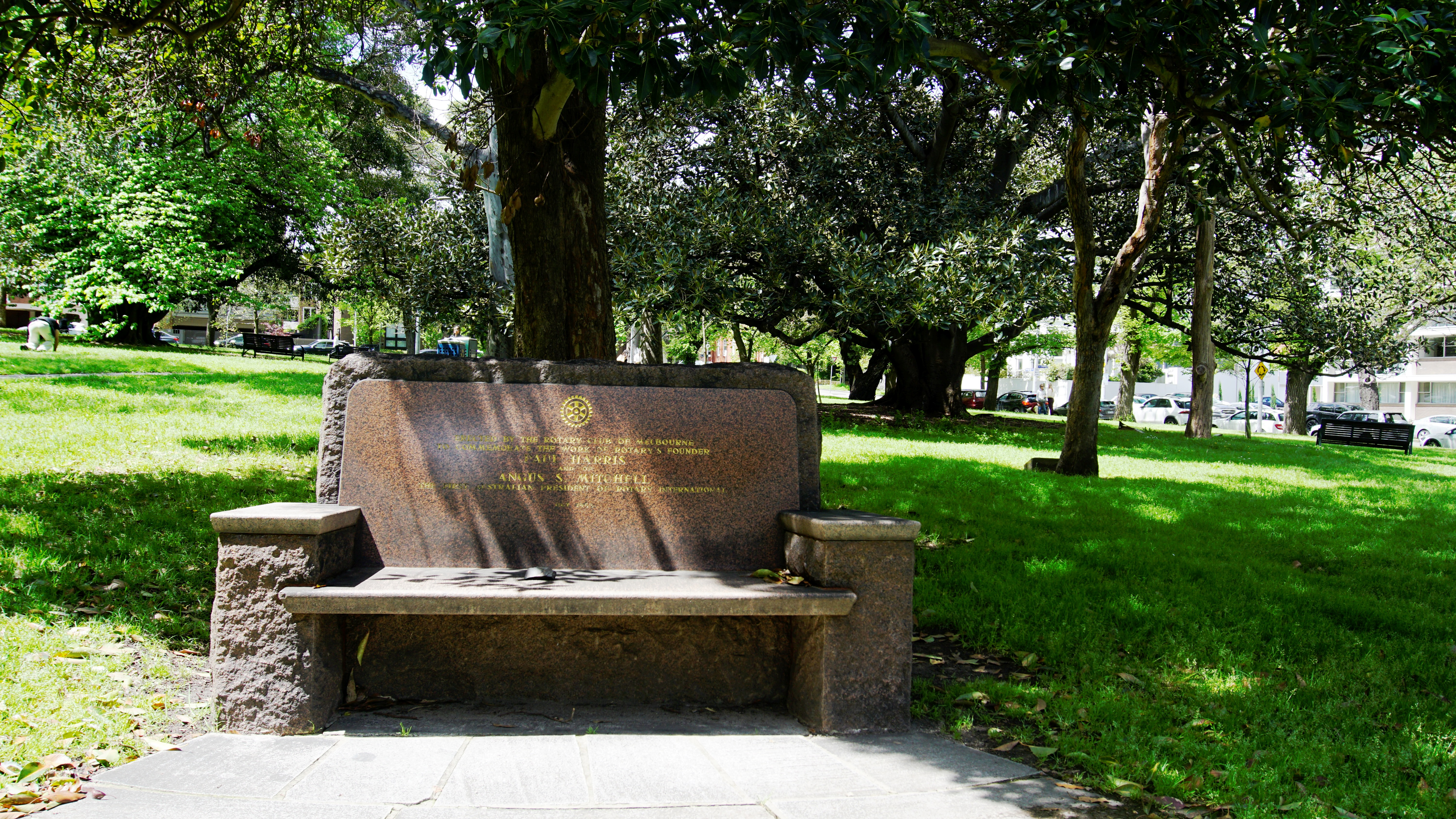
Memorial seat, Melbourne, Australia

Rotary clubs in Eastern Europe and communist nations were disbanded by 1945–46, but new Rotary clubs were organized in many other countries, and by the time of the national independence movements in Africa and Asia, the new nations already had Rotary clubs.

On January 11, 1951, a decree of the Sacred Congregation of the Holy Office, published by L'Osservatore Romano, forbade catholic clergy to accept membership of Rotary clubs. On January 27, 1951, a second decree of the Holy Office specified that warning against membership by laymen applied in some countries but not in the U.S.

Relationships with the Roman Catholic Church were changed again by Paul VI and John Paul II.

After the relaxation of government control of community groups in Russia and former Warsaw Pact nations, Rotarians were welcomed as club organizers, and clubs were formed in those countries, beginning with the Moscow club in 1990.

In 1985, Rotary launched its PolioPlus program to immunize all of the world's children against polio. As of 2011, Rotary had contributed more than 900 million US dollars to the cause.

As of 2006, Rotary had more than 1.4 million members in over 36,000 clubs among 200 countries and geographical areas, making it the most widespread by branches and second largest service club by membership, behind Lions Clubs International. The number of Rotarians has slightly declined in recent years: Between 2002 and 2006, they went from 1,245,000 to 1,223,000 members. North America accounts for 450,000 members, Asia for 300,000, Europe for 250,000, Latin America for 100,000, Oceania for 100,000 and Africa for 30,000.

=== Rotary International presidents (1990–present) ===
- Paulo V. C. Costa (1990–91)
- Rajendra K. Saboo (1991–92)
- Clifford L. Dochterman (1992–93)
- Robert R. Barth (1993–94)
- William H. Huntley (1994–95)
- Herbert G. Brown (1995–96)
- Luis Vicente Giay (1996–97)
- Glen W. Kinross (1997–98)
- James L. Lacy (1998–99)
- Carlo Ravizza (1999–2000)
- Frank J. Devlyn (2000–01)
- Richard D. King (2001–02)
- Bhichai Rattakul (2002–03)
- Jonathan B. Majiyagbe (2003–04)
- Glenn E. Estess, Sr. (2004–05)
- Carl-Wilhelm Stenhammar (2005–06)
- William Boyd (2006–07)
- Wilfrid J. Wilkinson (2007–08)
- Dong Kurn Lee (2008–09)
- John Kenny (2009–10)
- Ray Klinginsmith (2010–11)
- Kalyan Banerjee (2011–12)
- Sakuji Tanaka (2012–13)
- Ron D. Burton (2013–14)
- Gary C.K. Huang (2014–15)
- K.R. Ravindran (2015–16)
- John F. Germ (2016–17)
- Ian H. S. Riseley (2017–18)
- Barry Rassin (2018–19)
- Mark Daniel Maloney (2019–20)
- Holger Knaack (2020–21)
- Shekhar Mehta (2021–22)
- Jennifer E. Jones (2022–23)
- Gordon McInally (2023–24)
- Stephanie A. Urchick (2024–25)
- Francesco Arezzo (2025–26)

=== Other notable past presidents ===
- Paul P. Harris (1910–12)
- Clinton Presba Anderson (1932–33)
- Herbert J. Taylor (1954–55)
- Nitish Chandra Laharry (1962–63)
- Richard L. Evans (1966–67)
- Luther H. Hodges (1967–68)
- Sir Clem Renouf (1978–79)
- Carlos Canseco (1984–85)
- Royce Abbey (1988–89)

== Organization and administration ==
In order to carry out its service programs, Rotary is structured in club, district and international levels. Rotarians are members of their clubs. The clubs are chartered by the global organization Rotary International (RI) headquartered in Evanston, Illinois. For communication purposes, the more than 45,000 clubs worldwide are grouped into 529 districts, and the districts into 34 zones.

=== Rotary Clubs ===
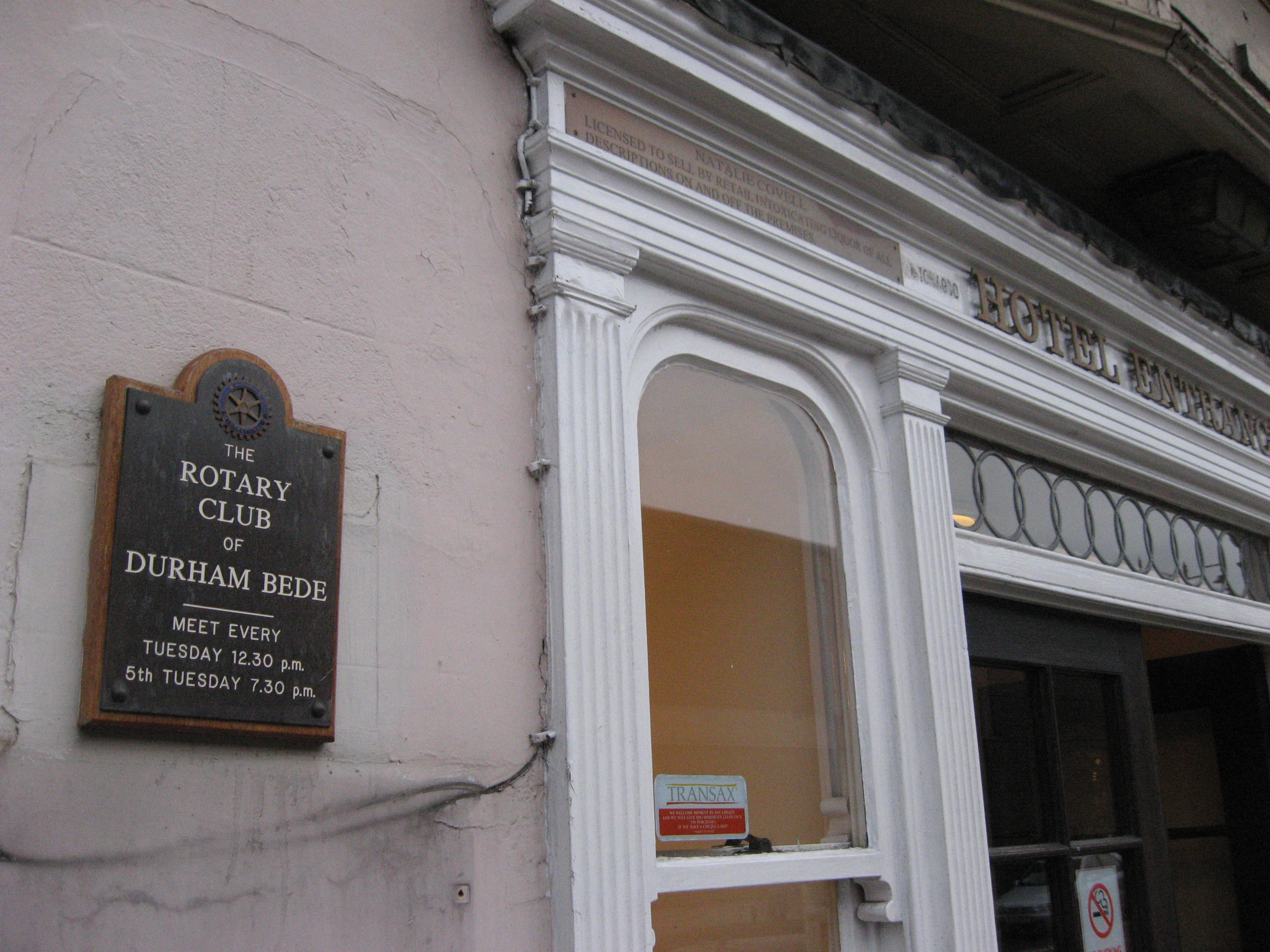
A plaque showing where the local Rotary Club meets, Durham, England

The Rotary Club is the basic unit of Rotary activity, and each club determines its own membership. Clubs originally were limited to a single club per city, municipality, or town, but Rotary International has encouraged the formation of one or more additional clubs in the largest cities when practical. Most clubs meet weekly, usually at a mealtime on a weekday in a regular location, when Rotarians can discuss club business and hear from guest speakers. Each club also conducts various service projects within its local community, and participates in special projects involving other clubs in the local district, and occasionally a special project in a "sister club" in another nation. Most clubs also hold social events at least quarterly and in some cases more often.

Each club elects its own president and officers among its active members for a one-year term. The clubs enjoy considerable autonomy within the framework of the standard constitution and the constitution and bylaws of Rotary International. The governing body of the club is the Club Board (sometimes called Club Council), consisting of the club president (who serves as the Board chairman), a president-elect, club secretary, club treasurer, and several Club Board directors, including the immediate past president and the President Elect. The president usually appoints the directors to serve as chairs of the major club committees, including those responsible for club service, vocational service, community service, youth service, and international service.

Rotarians may attend any Rotary club around the world at one of their weekly meetings.

==== Manila ====
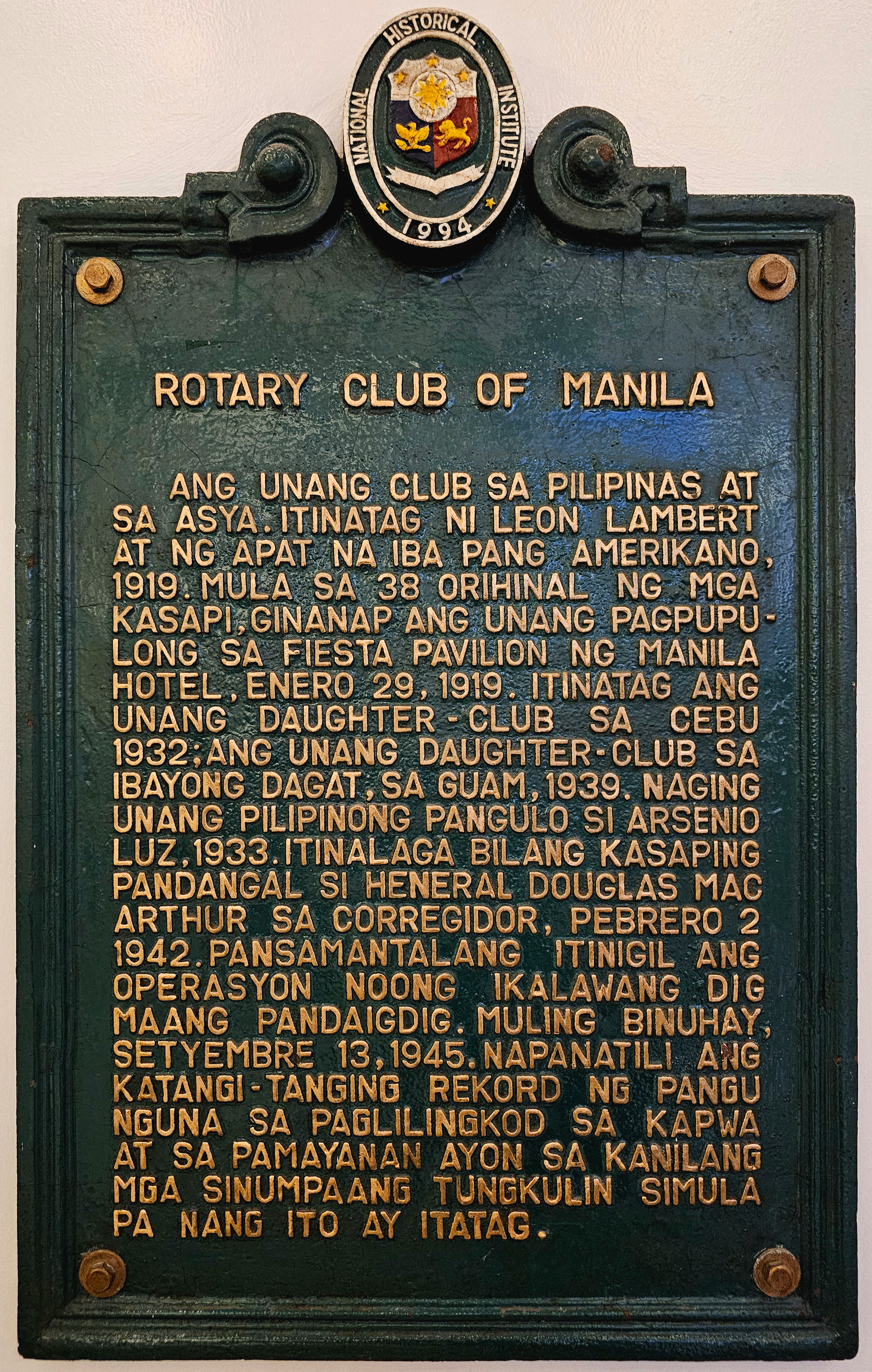
Historical marker installed by the National Historical Institute in 1994 inside the Manila Hotel

The Rotary Club of Manila is the first and oldest Rotary Club in Asia. After its establishment, the Rotary Club of Manila sponsored other organizations, including the Rotary Club of Cebu (1932), the Rotary Club of Iloilo (1933), the Community Chest Foundation, the Philippine Band of Mercy (1937), the Philippine Safety Council, and the Boy Scouts of America Philippine Islands Council (1923).

In 1919, Manila businessman Leon J. Lambert sent communication to the Rotary Club in Chicago about the possibility of organizing Rotary in the Philippines. In response to Lambert's proposal, Rotary sent Roger D. Pinneo of the Seattle Rotary Club to the Philippines to help set up a club in Manila. On 12 January 1919, Pinneo and Lambert held a luncheon meeting with four of Manila's prominent businessmen (Alfa Walter Beam, Fred Neal Berry, Edwin Emil Elser, and James Geary) to form an organizing committee. Another meeting later resulted in the formation of a Manila Rotary Club. The 38 charter members were men heavily involved in the sociopoliticoeconomic life of the country and active in many socio-civic endeavors. They included 35 Americans, 2 Filipinos, and 1 Chinese. Elected as officers were President Leon Lambert, Vice President Alfonso Sy Cip, Secretary Edwin Emil Elser, Treasurer Alfa Walter Beam, and Directors Fred Neal Berry, Gregorio Morente Nieva, and James Geary. The Rotary Club of Manila subsequently informed Rotary International in Chicago that the Manila Club had been formally organised. In June 1919, the Rotary Club of Manila heard from what became Rotary International, recognizing the Manila club with Charter 478.

The founding officers were:

- Leon J. Lambert: Sergeant, 13th Minnesota Volunteer Infantry, Spanish–American War (Aug 1898) and Philippine–American War (Feb–Aug 1899). Owner of Lambert Sales Co. and other businesses. Philippine delegate to Democratic National Convention, 1920, 1924, 1928, 1932. Honorary Vice-President, Democratic Party, 1912. Member, Committee on Rules and Order of Business, Democratic Party, 1912. Member, Platform and Resolutions Committee, Democratic Party, 1924.
- Alfonso Sycip / Xue Fenshi (1883–1969): The one Chinese RCM charter member. Chairman, Philippine Chinese General Chamber of Commerce, 1934–41.
- Edwin Emil Elser (21 Feb 1867, Hartford, Connecticut – 17 Jul 1962): Arrived in Manila in 1901 as agent of E.C. McCullough & Co. Became the leader in the Philippine insurance business, and an officer in some 20 companies and the American Chamber of Commerce of the Philippine Islands. Rotary Club of Manila President, 1922–23. Member, Philippine Council of National Defense. Grand Master, Grand Lodge, Free and Accepted Masons of the Philippine Islands, 1921. Philippine alternate delegate to the Republican National Convention, 1920, 1936. Brother of Manila businessman Henry W. Elser. As Rotary Club of Manila President in 1922, E. E. Elser wrote to the BSA regarding the possibility of organizing a Boy Scout Council in Manila. This resulted in the establishment of the Boy Scouts of America Philippine Islands Council.
- Alfa Walter Beam (15 Mar 1878, Bullionville, Lincoln County, Nevada –1 5 Mar 1944, Arlington, Virginia): Arrived in the Philippines in 1902 to take up assignment at Post Office. Later became President of Benguet Consolidated Mining Company.
- Fred Neal Berry (1884–1955): Arrived in the Philippines in 1898; served in the Spanish–American War. Clerk, Records Division, Civil Service of the Philippine Islands, 1904. Became agent of Procter and Gamble.
- Gregorio Nieva y Morente (1880–1951): Editor and publisher, The Philippine Review, 1916–22. One of the two Filipino charter members of the RCM, the other being Gabriel Lao.
- James Geary: Manager, Castle Bros., Wolf & Sons.

=== Rotaract Clubs ===
Rotaract is the Rotary-affiliated organization for young adults (university age and young professionals). They take action through community and international service, learn leadership skills, and participate in professional development. Rotaract clubs are either community or university based. "Rotaract" stands for "Rotary in Action", and its motto is "Self Development – Fellowship through Service".

Rotaract began as a program of Rotary International, and its first club was founded in 1968 by Charlotte North Rotary Club, located in Charlotte, North Carolina.

In 2019, Rotaract went from being a program of Rotary International to being a membership type of Rotary International, elevating its status to resemble that of Rotary clubs. As of July 1, 2020, Rotaract clubs can exist on their own, or may be sponsored by Rotary and/or Rotaract clubs. This makes them true "partners in service" and key members of the family of Rotary. A Rotaract club may, but is not required to, establish upper age limits, provided that the club (in accordance with its bylaws) obtain the concurrence of its members.

=== District level ===
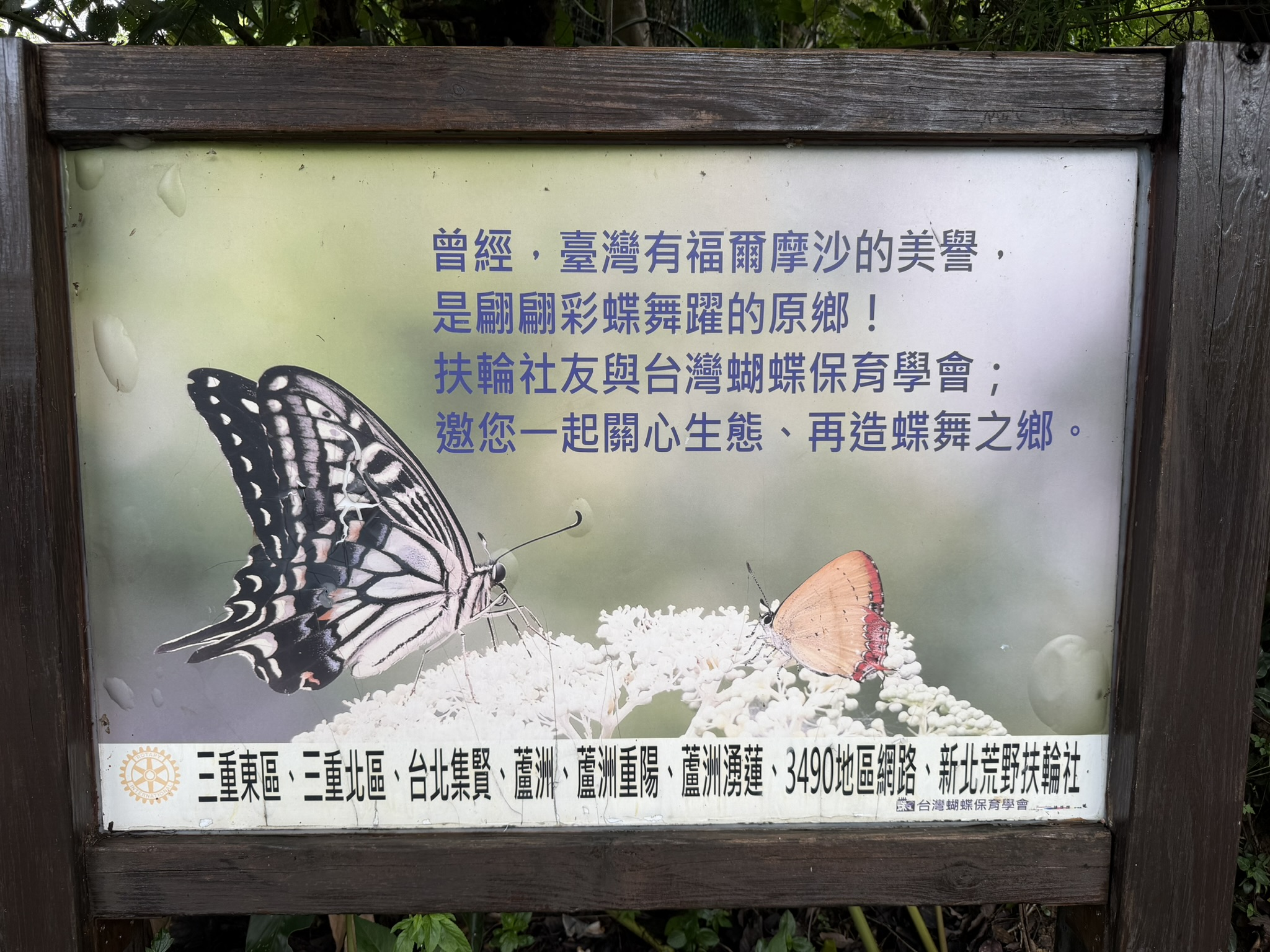
District 3490 sponsored sign at Jiannan Butterfly Garden, Taipei

A District Governor (DG), who is an officer of Rotary International and represents the RI board of directors in the field, leads their respective Rotary district. Each DG is nominated by the clubs of their district, and elected by all the clubs meeting in the annual RI District Conference held each year. The DG appoints Assistant Governors (AGs) from among the Rotarians of the district to assist in the management of Rotary activity and multi-club projects in the district. AGs act as liaisons between the DG and the clubs, to make communication flow more smoothly throughout the District.

As part of a DG's duties, they must visit every club in their District at least once during their year as DG in order to spread the RI President's message and theme for that year. The AGs are assigned specific clubs to be under their purview, and they must accompany the DG on their official club visits to those particular clubs.

=== Zone level ===
Rotary is globally divided into 34 paired zones. The clubs in a zone select every 4 years a director who serves during two years as a member of the RI Board. A director has, besides his or her duties in the Board, a liaison position between the Board and the approximately 15 Rotary districts in the zone from which he or she is selected and the circa 15 districts in the adjacent zone.

=== Rotary International ===
Rotary International is governed by a board of directors composed of the international president, the president-elect, 17 directors and (without voting rights) the general secretary. The nomination and the election of each president is handled in the one- to three-year period before the president takes office, and is based on requirements including geographical balance and previous service as a district governor and board member. The international board meets quarterly to establish policies and make recommendations to the overall governing bodies, the RI Convention and the RI Council on Legislation.

==== Rotary International President ====
Rotary's president presides over the Board of Directors and is elected to a one-year term. The current president through June 2026 is Francesco Arezzo.

==== General Secretary / CEO ====
Rotary International has a general secretary, who also acts as chief executive officer and leads the Rotary Foundation. The current holder of the post is John Hewko.

== Membership ==
According to its constitutions ("Charters"), Rotary defines itself as a non-partisan, non-sectarian organization. Membership is open to "adult persons who demonstrate good character, integrity, and leadership; possess good reputation within their business, profession, occupation, and/or community."

One can contact a Rotary club to inquire about membership and it was a traditional method that a person can join a Rotary club only if invited; there is the ability to join without an invitation but it is recommended to attend a meeting to ensure a suitable fit to the club.

=== Active membership ===
Active membership is by invitation from a current Rotarian, to professionals or businesspersons working in diverse areas of endeavour. Each club may limit up to ten percent of its membership representing each business or profession in the area it serves. The goal of the clubs is to promote service to the community they work in, as well as to the wider world. Many projects are organised for the local community by a single club, but some are organised globally.

=== Honorary membership ===
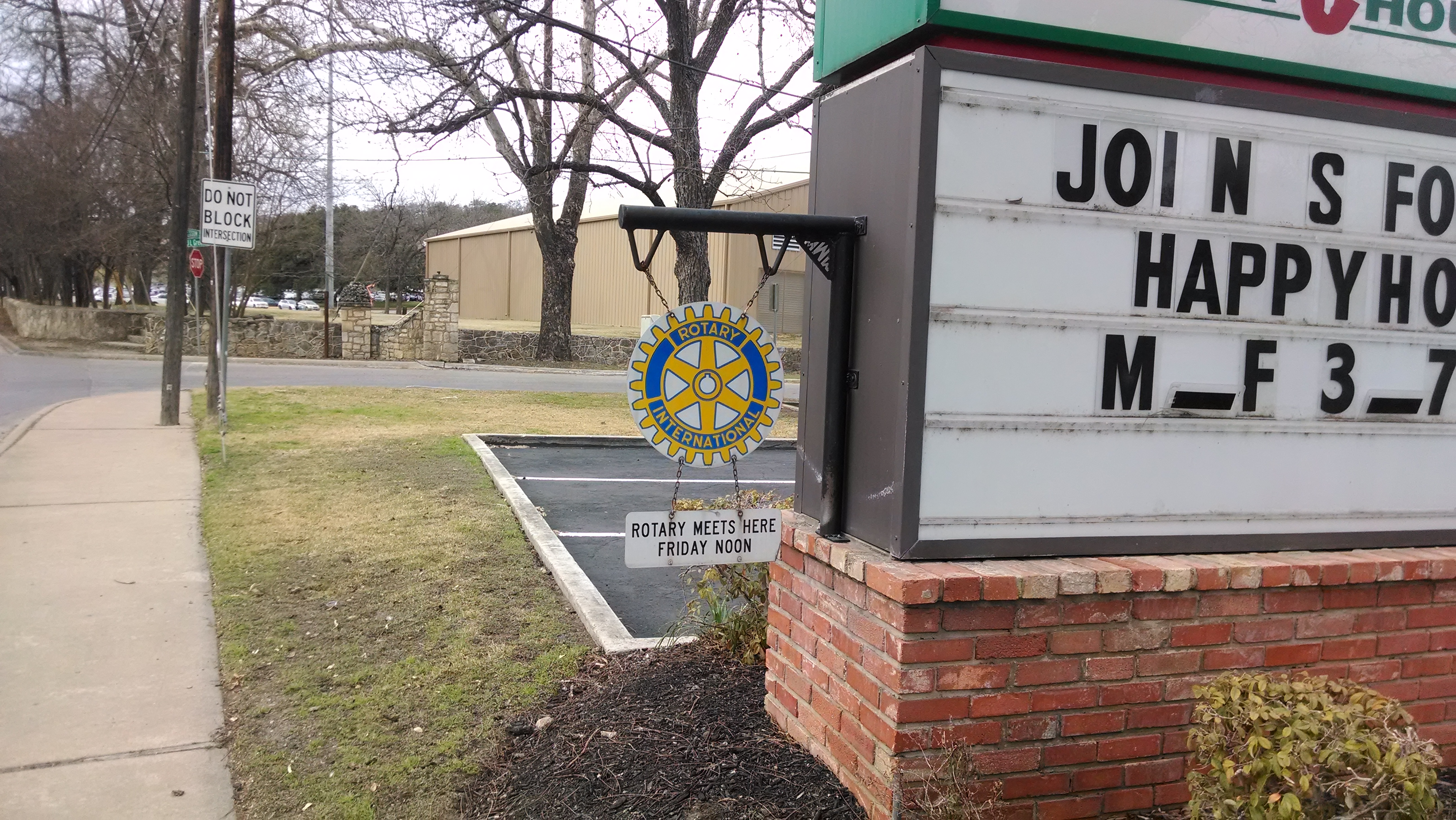
A sign showing where the local Rotary Club meets, San Marcos, Texas, United States

Clubs may award honorary membership in recognition of a person's distinguished efforts in furtherance of Rotary ideals or otherwise in support of Rotary's cause. As the highest distinction a Rotary club can confer on an individual, it is exercised only in exceptional cases. Honorary members are exempt from the payment of admission fees and dues. They have no voting privileges and are not eligible to hold any office in their club. Honorary membership is time-limited and terminates automatically at the end of the term, usually one year. It may be extended for an additional period or may also be revoked at any time. Examples of honorary members are heads of state or former heads of state, scientists, members of the military, and other famous figures. However, as each club may establish different rules for honorary members, there will be some variation in terms of selection and privileges of honorary members.

=== Female membership ===
From 1905 until the 1980s, women were not allowed membership in Rotary clubs, although Rotarian spouses, including Paul Harris's wife Jean, were often members of the similar "Inner Wheel" club. Women did play some roles, and Jean Thomson Harris made numerous speeches. Dale Carnegie's biographer Carlos Roberto Bacila describes that in 1955, when women were not permitted to attend Rotary meetings, the Brooklyn Rotary Club made an exception and finally allowed Marilyn Burke, Carnegie's secretary, to accompany him in a lecture inside the Rotary. In 1963, it was noted that the Rotary practice of involving wives in club activities had helped to break down female seclusion in some countries. Clubs such as Rotary were pre-dated by women's service organisations, which started in the United States as early as 1790.

The first Irish clubs discussed admitting women as members in 1912, but the proposal foundered over issues of social class. Gender equity in Rotary moved beyond the theoretical question when in 1976, the Rotary Club of Duarte, California, admitted three women as members. After the club refused to remove the women from membership, Rotary International revoked the club's charter in 1978. The Duarte club filed suit in the California courts, claiming that Rotary Clubs are business establishments subject to regulation under California's Unruh Civil Rights Act, which bans discrimination based on race, gender, religion or ethnic origin. Rotary International then appealed the decision to the U.S. Supreme Court. The RI attorney argued that "... [the decision] threatens to force us to take in everyone, like a motel". The Duarte Club was not alone in opposing RI leadership; the Seattle-International District club unanimously voted to admit women in 1986. The United States Supreme Court, on 4 May 1987, confirmed the Californian decision supporting women, in the case Rotary International v. Rotary Club of Duarte. Susan Sponsel became the first female Rotarian that year. Rotary International removed the gender requirements from its requirements for club charters, and most clubs in most countries have opted to include women as members of Rotary Clubs. The first female club president to be elected was Sylvia Whitlock of the Rotary Club of Duarte, California in 1987. By 2007, there was a female trustee of Rotary's charitable wing The Rotary Foundation while female district governors and club presidents were common.

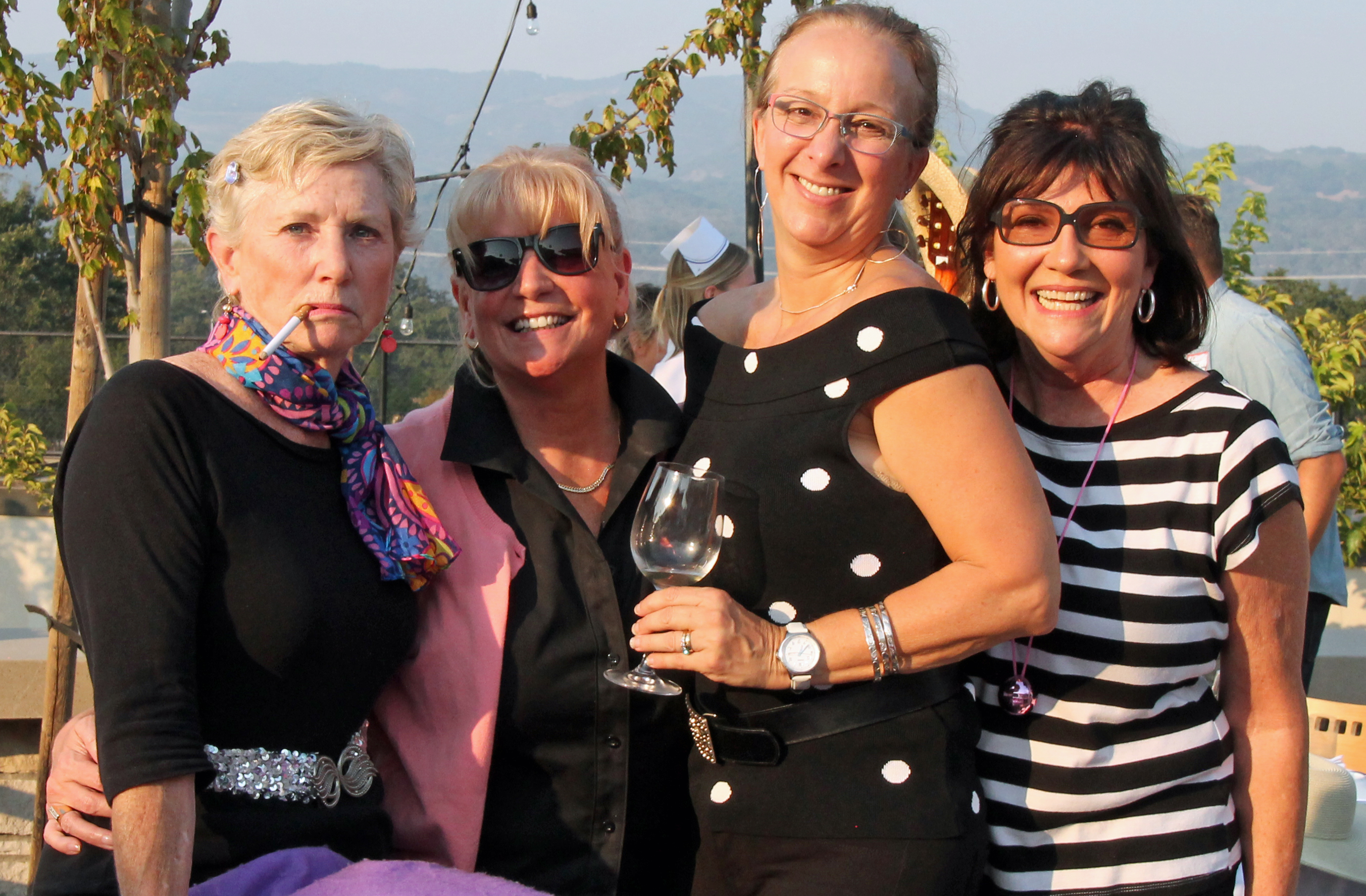
Women Rotarians at the Rotary Club of Sonoma Valley's annual fundraiser in 2015

Women currently account for 22% of international Rotary membership. In 2013, Anne L. Matthews, a Rotarian from South Carolina, began her term as the first female vice-president of Rotary International, and was followed by another female vice-president, Celia Cruz de Giay. Also in 2013, Nan McCreadie was appointed as the first female president of Rotary International in Great Britain and Ireland (RIBI). The first woman to join Rotary in Ghana, West Africa was Hilda Danquah (Rotary Club of Cape Coast) in 1992. The first woman president in Ghana was Dr. Naana Agyeman-Mensah in 2001 (Rotary Club of Accra-Airport). Up until 2013, there has been 46 women presidents in the 30 Rotary clubs in Ghana. In 2013, Stella Dongo from Zimbabwe was appointed District Governor for District 9210 (Zimbabwe/Zambia/Malawi/Northern-Mozambique) for the Rotary year 2013–14 making her the first female District Governor in the region. She had previously held the offices of Assistant Governor (2006–08), District Administrator (2008–09) and President of The Rotary Club of Highlands (2005–06). She was also Zimbabwe's Country Coordinator (2009–10). Stella, who is a Master PRLS 5 Graduate has been recognised and awarded various District awards including Most Able President for year 2005–06 and Assistant Governor of the year 2006–07 and a Paul Harris Fellow. The first female President of Rotary International was Jennifer E. Jones, President for 2022–23.

One of Rotary's official mottoes (the other being "Service Above Self"), "He Profits Most Who Serves Best", became inclusive of women when it was changed in 2004 to "They Profit Most Who Serve Best"; later, in 2010, it was changed to "One Profits Most Who Serves Best".

=== Racial and sexual orientation diversity ===
The first Rotary Clubs in Asia were in Manila in the Philippines and Shanghai in China, each in July 1919. Rotary's office in Illinois immediately began encouraging the Rotary Club of Shanghai to recruit Chinese members "believing that when a considerable number of the native business and professional men have been so honoured, the Shanghai Club will begin to realize its period of greatest success." As part of considering the application of a Club to be chartered in Kolkata (then Calcutta), India in January 1920 and Tokyo, Japan in October 1920, Rotary formally considered the issue of racial restriction in membership and determined that the organization could not allow racial restrictions to the organization's growth. In Rotary's legislative deliberations in June 1921, it was formally determined that racial restrictions would not be permitted. Non-racialism was included in the terms of the standard constitution in 1922 and required to be adopted by all member Clubs.

Rotary and other service clubs in the last decade of the 20th century became open to gay members.

== Affiliates ==
Rotary Clubs sponsor a number of affiliated clubs that promote the goals of Rotary in their community.

=== Inner Wheel Clubs ===
Inner Wheel is an international organization founded in 1924 to unite wives and daughters of Rotarians. Inner Wheel Clubs exist in over 103 countries. Like Rotary, Inner Wheel is divided into local clubs and districts.

== Programs and activities of Rotary International ==
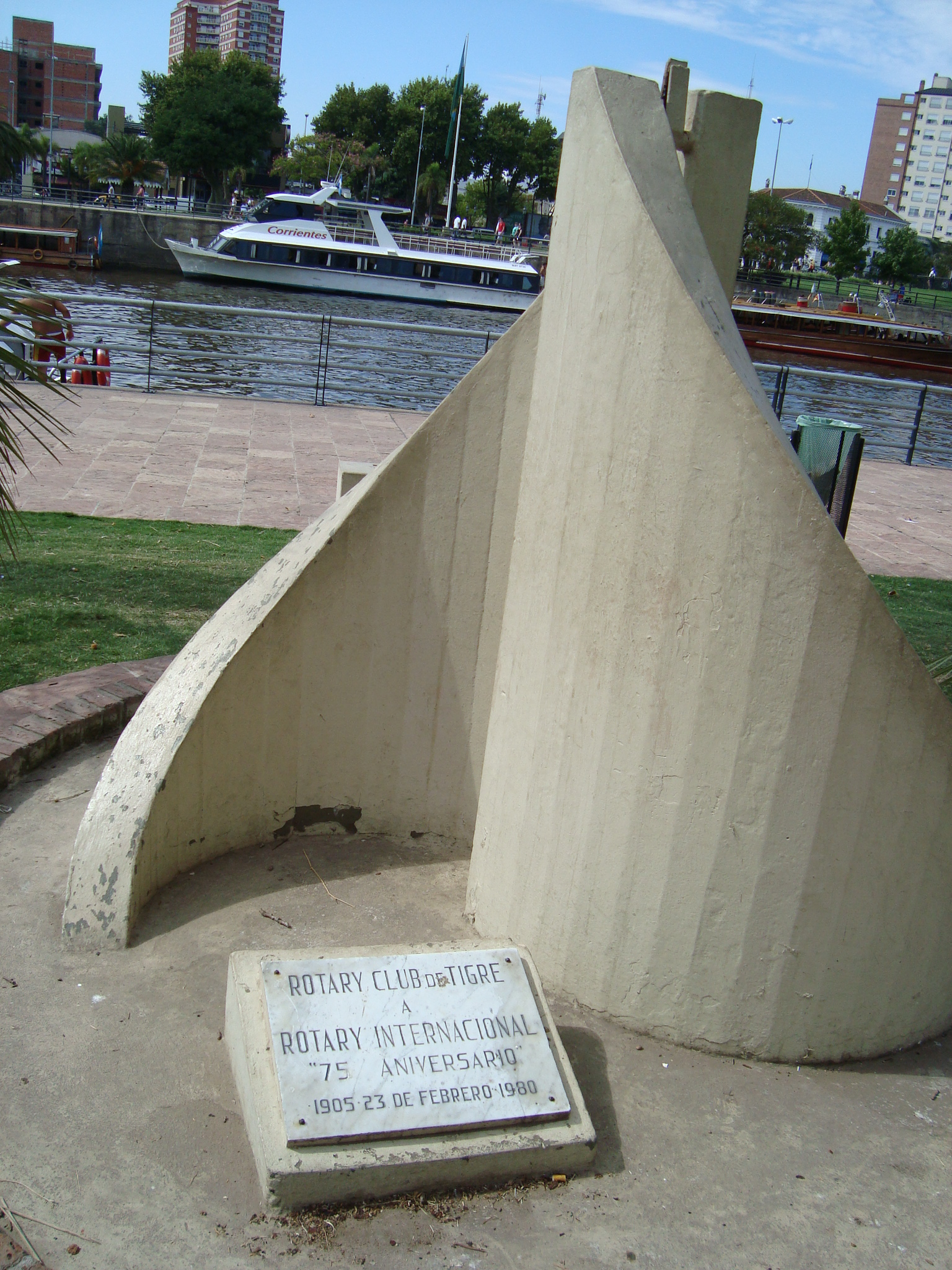
Rotary International monument in Tigre, Argentina

Rotary concentrates on seven areas: promoting peace, improving health through disease prevention and treatment, improving the health of mothers and children, water and sanitation, education, economic development, and supporting the environment.

=== PolioPlus ===
The most notable current global project, PolioPlus, is contributing to the global eradication of polio. Sergio Mulitsch di Palmenberg (1923–1987), Governor of RI District 204 (1984–1985), founder of the RC of Treviglio and Pianura Bergamasca (Italy), was the man who inspired and promoted the RI PolioPlus vaccination campaign. Mulitsch made it possible shipping the first 500,000 doses of antipolio vaccine to the Philippines at the beginning of 1980. This project later gave rise to the NGO "Nuovi Spazi al Servire" co-ordinated by Luciano Ravaglia (RC Forlì, Italy). Since beginning the project in 1985, Rotarians have contributed over US$850 million and hundreds of thousands of volunteer-hours, contributing to the inoculation of more than two billion of the world's children. Inspired by Rotary's commitment, the World Health Organization (WHO) passed a resolution in 1988 to eradicate polio by 2000. Now a partner in the Global Polio Eradication Initiative (GPEI) with WHO, UNICEF and the U.S. Centers for Disease Control and Prevention, Rotary is recognized by the United Nations as the key private partner in the eradication effort.

In 2008, Rotary received a $100 million challenge grant from the Bill and Melinda Gates Foundation. Rotary committed to raising $100 million. In January 2009, Bill Gates announced a second challenge grant of $255 million. Rotary again committed to raising another $100 million. In total, Rotary will raise $200 million by June 30, 2012. Together, the Gates Foundation and Rotary have committed $555 million toward the eradication of polio. At the time of the second challenge grant, Bill Gates said:

We know that it's a formidable challenge to eradicate a disease that has killed and crippled children since at least the time of the ancient Egyptians. We don't know exactly when the last child will be affected. But we do have the vaccines to wipe it out. Countries do have the will to deploy all the tools at their disposal. If we all have the fortitude to see this effort through to the end, then we will eradicate polio.

There has been some limited criticism concerning the program for polio eradication. There are some reservations regarding the adaptation capabilities of the virus in some of the oral vaccines, which have been reported to cause infection in populations with low vaccination coverage. As stated by Vaccine Alliance, however, in spite of the limited risk of polio vaccination, it would neither be prudent nor practicable to cease the vaccination program until there is strong evidence that "all wild poliovirus transmission [has been] stopped". In a 2006 speech at the Rotary International Convention, held at the Bella Center in Copenhagen, Bruce Cohick stated that polio in all its known wild forms would be eliminated by late 2008, provided efforts in Nigeria, Afghanistan, Pakistan, and India all proceed with their current momentum. As of October 2012, Nigeria, Afghanistan, and Pakistan still had wild polio, but it had been eliminated in India.

In 2014, polio survivor and Rotarian Ramesh Ferris met with the Dalai Lama to discuss the Global Polio Eradication Initiative. The meeting went viral via a selfie taken by Ferris with the Dalai Lama.

=== Interact ===
Interact (standing for "International Action") is Rotary International's service club for young people ages 12 to 18. Interact clubs are sponsored by Rotary clubs (and may be co-sponsored by Rotaract clubs), which provide support and guidance, but they are self-governing and self-supporting.

Club membership varies greatly. Clubs can be single gender or mixed, large or small. They can draw from the student body of a single school or from two or more schools in the same community, and welcome home-schooled students.

Each year, Interact clubs complete at least two community service projects, one of which furthers international understanding and goodwill. Through these efforts, Interactors develop a network of friendships with local and overseas clubs and learn the importance of

- Developing leadership skills and personal integrity
- Demonstrating helpfulness and respect for others
- Understanding the value of individual responsibility and hard work
- Advancing international understanding and goodwill

More than 340,000 young people are involved in Interact.

=== RYLA ===
RYLA, or Rotary Youth Leadership Awards, is a leadership program for young people aged 14 to 30. The Rotary Youth Leadership Awards program offers Rotarians an opportunity to personally participate in developing qualities of leadership, good citizenship, and personal and professional development in the young people of their communities. RYLA program content and format can be customized to target limited age groups in order to address varying needs and interests within the community.

=== Rotary Community Corps ===
The Rotary Community Corps (RCC) is a volunteer organization which facilitates non-Rotarians who want to help meet community needs. As of 2021, there were close to 12,000 RCC members in over 100 countries.

=== Exchanges and scholarships ===
Some of Rotary's most visible programs include Rotary Youth Exchange (RYE), a student exchange program for students in secondary education, from which Rotex was created to aid these programs. The Rotary Foundation's oldest program, Ambassadorial Scholarships ended in 2013. Effective July 2009, the Rotary Foundation previously ended funding for the Cultural and Multi-Year Ambassadorial Scholarships as well as Rotary Grants for University Teachers.

Georgia Rotary Student Program (GRSP) is a program that offers scholarships to international college students to study in the state of Georgia. It is a one-year ambassadorial scholarship that aims to promote peace, one of the causes of Rotary International, through friendship and cultural understanding.

Rotary Fellowships, paid by the foundation launched in honor of Paul Harris in 1947, specialize in providing graduate fellowships around the world, usually in countries other than their own in order to provide international exposure and experience to the recipient.

Recently, a new program was established known as the Rotary peace and Conflict Resolution program which provides funds for two years of graduate study in one of eight universities around the world. Rotary is naming about 75 of these scholars each year. The applications for these scholarships are found on line but each application must be endorsed by a local Rotary Club. Children and other close relatives of Rotarians are not eligible.

Adults up to the age of 30 may participate in New Generations Service Exchange for up to six months and may be organized for individuals or groups. The minimum age of the participants shall be the age of majority in the host country, but not be younger than age 18. New Generations Service Exchanges must have a strong humanitarian or vocational service component.

=== Rotary Peace Centers ===
Starting in 2002, The Rotary Foundation partnered with eight universities around the world to create the Rotary Centers for International Studies in peace and conflict resolution. The universities included International Christian University (Japan), University of Queensland (Australia), Paris Institute of Political Studies (Sciences Po) (France), University of Bradford (UK), Universidad del Salvador (Argentina), University of North Carolina at Chapel Hill (US), Duke University (US), and University of California, Berkeley (US) Since then, the Rotary Foundation's Board of Trustees has dropped its association with the Center in France at the Paris Institute of Political Studies, the Center in Argentina at the Universidad del Salvador, and the Center in the US at the University of California. In 2006, a new Rotary Peace Center at Chulalongkorn University (Thailand) began offering a three-month professional development program in peace and conflict studies for mid-level and upper-level professionals. In 2011, the Rotary Peace Center at Uppsala University (Sweden) was established and began offering a two-year master's program in peace and conflict studies.

Up to 100 Rotary Peace Fellows are selected annually to earn either a professional development certificate in peace and conflict studies or a master's degree in a range of disciplines related to peace and security. Each Rotary Peace Center offers a unique curriculum and field-based learning opportunities that examine peace and conflict theory through a variety of different frameworks. The first class graduated in 2004. As with many such university programs in "peace and conflict studies", questions have been raised concerning political bias and controversial grants. The average grant was about $75,000 per fellow for the two-year program and $12,000 per fellow for the three-month certificate program.

=== Literacy programs ===
Rotary clubs worldwide place a focus on increasing literacy. Such importance has been placed on literacy that Rotary International has created a "Rotary Literacy Month" that takes place during the month of March. Rotary clubs also aim to conduct many literacy events during the week of September 8, which is International Literacy Day. Some Rotary clubs raise funds for schools and other literacy organizations. Many clubs take part in a reading program called "Rotary Readers", in which a Rotary member spends time in a classroom with a designated student, and reads one-on-one with them. Some Rotary clubs participate in book donations, both locally and internationally. As well as participating in book donations and literacy events, there are educational titles written about Rotary Clubs and members, such as Rotary Clubs Help People, Carol is a Rotarian by Rotarian and children's book author Bruce Larkin and "Rhoda's Rescue" by Maine author Barbara Walsh in conjunction with Rotary Club of Waterville, Maine's Rhoda Reads early literacy program.

== Rotex - District 4851 ==
Rotex stands for Rotary Exchange. It is an alumni association created to support the exchange program Rotary Youth Exchange (RYE) and its participants. It is a society composed of former RYE students that functions as a middleman between Rotary Clubs and current exchange students and these clubs follow Rotary's districtual organization. The fact that Rotex is currently established in Argentina facilitates the process of exchange by helping RYE with administrative issues and providing emotional support to both Argentinian and foreign exchange students. The members of Rotex share the same values as Rotary International. According to Rotex's bylaw, their aim is to promote peace and connection around the world. Rotex members and exchange students act as peace ambassadors, based on the idea that when two countries know each other (by their citizens sharing experiences together), they are very unlikely to be in conflict.

=== Creation ===
The first steps towards the formal foundation of Rotex International started in 2012 in Bordeaux, France, when Rebounds from all around the world met and began to think about how to form an alumni association; this is considered the 1st Rotex Convention even though it was not yet acknowledged as such by Rotary. In 2014, the 2nd Convention took place in Brussels, where these Rebounds got together with the aim of improving this association, but still they were not recognized by Rotary as a part of the organization. It was in the 3rd Rotex Convention that this alumni association was formally acknowledged by Rotary and the first board of Rotex was elected. When it comes to the District 4851 of Rotex in Argentina, it was officially founded on June 15, 2023.The certificate issued to the association by Rotary International is herein cited.

=== Composition: District 4851 ===
The Argentinian district is made up of the ex-Districts 4815 and 4849 which were fused into the new "District 4851", which consists of more than 100 clubs and encompasses the provinces of Córdoba, Catamarca, La Rioja, Salta, Jujuy, Tucumán, Santiago del Estero, San Luis, Mendoza and San Juan.

=== Membership and responsibilities ===
In order to join Rotex in the District 4851, it is necessary to have participated in the RYE program uninterruptedly and successfully, i.e. without any warning for not following Rotary's rules during the exchange and at least six months must have passed after the exchange has finished. Other requirements are to have completed the exchange with District 4851, and to be currently living in one of the District 4851's provinces. Rotex participants' responsibilities imply ensuring that Outbound, Inbound, and Rebound students from the RYE program are well-supported, share practices and are informed about the values that have to be followed. Rotex members also organize trips and events for exchange students to bound and conferences to better cope with administrative matters and to develop skills to deal with potential challenges that could arise when taking care of underage exchange students.

=== Income ===
Rotex 4851's income mainly comes from donations from both public and private institutions, cultural, social and sports activities open to the community, and contributions from Rotary International and other Rotary clubs, among others.

=== Structure ===
Rotex's authorities of District 4851 are hierarchically organized into three constitutive parts: Board of Directors, Committees and Assemblies. All charges last one year, from July to June. Apart from Rotex's authorities, there are also commissions made up of the members who contact new exchange students and help them with their exchange process.

Board of Directors: It is the executive organ of District 4851 which is composed of the President, the Vice president, the Secretary, the Prosecretary, and the Treasurer. The members of the Board are chosen annually according to the Rotary calendar. The Board of Directors attends all RYE events of District 4851, manages Rotex 4851 income, and elaborates a presentation at the beginning and end of the annual period, in which they hand in a balance sheet with the Board's expectations and detailed information.

Committees: The Committees are composed of elected Rotary members.

Assemblies: The Assemblies consist of the Board of Directors and the Committees. In these Assemblies, Ordinary and Extraordinary meetings are held at least once per month. Some topics which are dealt with in these meetings include the coordination and election of Committees as well as the planification of the schedule of activities. Furthermore, the Assembly has the power to elect and remove authorities, approve the balance sheet of the outgoing mandate and modify or remove provisions in the Internal Regulations of Rotex 4851.

Commissions: Commissions are made up of Rotex official members. The work zones are specialized and focused according to the needs that the commissions think necessary. Members work according to the roles of Managers and Coordinators in relation to the following commissions:

1. Rotary Candidates;
2. Inbounds;
3. Outbounds;
4. Rotex Candidates.

All commissions are made up of Rotex volunteers or Rotex members who are recommended by the Board of Directors or the International Committee (or both).

=== Terminology ===
- Outbound: A RYE student before and during exchange, from the perspective of their sponsoring district(s).
- Inbound: A RYE student before and during exchange, from the perspective of their host district(s).
- Rebound: A RYE student after they have completed their exchange year and returned to their home country.
- RYE Alumni: All former Rotary Youth Exchange program participants.
- Rotex: RYE alumni who actively support the RYE program and its participants.
- Rotex Association: An organization of Rotex, usually covering the same area as its respective RYE program. This is most often organized at the district or multidistrict level.

== Publications ==
Rotary International publishes an official monthly magazine now named Rotary in English (first published in 1911 as The National Rotarian). From April 1923 to August 1928, the official magazine was managed and printed from the same building – the Atwell Building – as Rotary's office and headquarters; the building was designed for Atwell Printing and Binding Company by famed Chicago architect, Alfred S. Alschuler.

Other periodicals are independently produced in more than 20 different major languages and distributed in 130 countries. One of them is Rotary Norden which is distributed in four language editions in five countries: Denmark, Finland, Iceland, Norway and Sweden.

== Honors ==
- Honorary-Member of the Order of Merit, Portugal (2 February 2005)

== See also ==
- List of Rotarians
