= The Rotary Foundation =

International nonprofit organization

The Rotary Foundation is a non-profit corporation that supports the efforts of Rotary International to achieve world understanding and peace through international humanitarian, educational, and cultural exchange programs. It is supported solely by voluntary contributions.

The foundation was established in 1917 by Rotary International's sixth president, Arch C. Klumph, as an endowment fund for Rotary "to do good in the world." It has grown from an initial contribution of US $26.50 to more than US $1 billion. It has one of the largest and most prestigious international fellowship programs in the world.

== Programs ==
=== Polio eradication ===
PolioPlus: Rotarians have mobilized by the hundreds of thousands to ensure that children are immunized against this crippling disease and that surveillance is strong despite the poor infrastructure, extreme poverty, and civil strife in many countries. The Polio Plus program was promoted by Sergio Mulitsch di Palmenberg, President and founder of Rotary Club Treviglio e Pianura Bergamasca in Rome, during the June 1979 3H Promotion Convention. Mulitsch, thanks to the 204 District Governo VALMIGI, began the fundraising and, thanks to their professional packaging technology, solved the temperature shipping issue, starting the first immunization campaign in the Philippines in 1980. Since the PolioPlus program's inception in 1985, more than two billion children have received the oral polio vaccine. To date, 209 countries, territories, and areas around the world are polio-free. As of January 2012, India was declared polio-free for the first time in history, leaving just Pakistan, Nigeria, and Afghanistan with endemic polio. As of June 2011, Rotary has committed more than US $850 million to global polio eradication. Rotary has received $355 million in challenge grants from the Bill and Melinda Gates Foundation. The Bill and Melinda Gates Foundation: Rotary committed to raising $200 million by June 30, 2012, and met that goal by January 2012. This represents another $555 million toward polio eradication.

PolioPlus Fund: Grants supported out of the PolioPlus Fund that are primarily geared towards national level and supra-national efforts. For example, National PolioPlus Committee chairs or a major partner agency, such as the World Health Organization or UNICEF may apply for these funds. Support is available for eradication efforts in polio-endemic, recently endemic, and high-risk countries, including National Immunization Days, poliovirus transmission monitoring, and other activities.

PolioPlus Partners is a program that allows Rotarians to participate in the polio eradication effort by contributing to specific social mobilization and surveillance activities in polio-endemic countries. In 2003–2004, grants were approved in Africa and South Asia for a total of $330,000.

=== Humanitarian grants programs ===
Disaster Recovery: Facilitates club efforts to support disaster preparedness and recovery.

District Simplified Grants: Support for short-term service activities or humanitarian endeavors of districts in communities locally or internationally. This program began in 2003–2004 and, projects in 44 countries for US$5.2 million were awarded.

Health, Hunger, and Humanity (3-H) Grants: Support for large-scale, two- to four-year projects that improve health, alleviate hunger, or promote human development. Since 1978, projects in 74 countries have been funded for US$74 million. As of 1 July 2009, the foundation will no longer award 3-H grants, except projects being developed to support water and sanitation projects in Ghana, the Philippines, and the Dominican Republic.

3-H Planning Grants: Support for the planning activities of Rotary clubs and districts designing 3-H projects of significant size and impact. Also in a moratorium in conjunction with the 3-H Grants program.

Matching Grants: – Provide matching funds for the international service projects of Rotary clubs and districts. Since 1965, more than 20,000 Matching Grants projects in 166 countries have been funded at a cost of more than US$198 million.

=== Educational programs ===
Scholarships: Founded in 1947, the Ambassadorial Scholarships program was the largest non-governmental and most international scholarship program in the world. Scholars studied in a country other than their own where they serve as unofficial ambassadors of goodwill. Over 37,000 scholars from some 110 countries received scholarships at a cost of almost US$446 million. The program ended in 2013. Scholarships are now funded by district and global grants and are offered directly through Rotary clubs.

Group Study Exchange (GSE): These annual awards are made to paired Rotary districts to provide travel expenses for a team of non-Rotarians from a variety of vocations. Rotarian hosts organize a four- to six-week itinerary of educational and cultural points of interest. Since 1965, almost 48,000 individuals in more than 11,000 teams from more than 100 countries have participated at a cost of US$85 million.

Rotary Peace Fellowships: Up to 100 fellows are selected every year in a globally competitive process based on personal, academic, and professional achievements. Fellows earn a master's-level degree or a professional development certificate in peace and conflict studies at one of six Rotary Peace Centers at leading universities in Australia, England, Sweden, Japan, the United States and Thailand.

Rotary Grants for University Teachers: Awarded to faculty members to teach in a developing nation for three to ten months. Since 1985, 377 university teachers have taught at a college or university in a developing country. As of 1 July 2009, the foundation has discontinued this program.

== See also ==
- Rotary Scholarships
