= List of companies of North Macedonia =

Location of North Macedonia

North Macedonia is a country in the Balkan peninsula in Southeast Europe. Ranked as the fourth "best reformatory state" out of 178 countries ranked by the World Bank in 2009, North Macedonia has undergone considerable economic reform since independence. The country has developed an open economy with trade accounting for more than 90% of GDP in recent years. Since 1996, North Macedonia has witnessed steady, though slow, economic growth with GDP growing by 3.1% in 2005. This figure was projected to rise to an average of 5.2% in the 2006–2010 period. The government has proven successful in its efforts to combat inflation, with an inflation rate of only 3% in 2006 and 2% in 2007, and has implemented policies focused on attracting foreign investment and promoting the development of small and medium-sized enterprises (SMEs). The current government introduced a flat tax system with the intention of making the country more attractive to foreign investment. The flat tax rate was 12% in 2007 and was further lowered to 10% in 2008.

Tourism is an important part of the economy of North Macedonia. The country's abundance of natural and cultural attractions make it an attractive destination of visitors. It receives about 700,000 tourists annually.

== Notable firms ==
This list includes notable companies with primary headquarters located in the country. The industry and sector follow the Industry Classification Benchmark taxonomy. Organizations which have ceased operations are included and noted as defunct.

Notable companies Status: P=Private, S=State; A=Active, D=Defunct
Name	Industry	Sector	Headquarters	Founded	Notes	Status	
Aktiva	Basic materials	Iron & steel	Štip	1999	Steel	P	A
Alkaloid	Health care	Pharmaceutical	Skopje	1936	Cosmetics, chemistry, botanics	P	A
Alpha Bank	Financials	Banks	Skopje	1993	Commercial Bank	P	A
DON Market	Consumer services	Food retailers & wholesalers	Ohrid	2007	Supermarket chain	P	A
ESM	Utilities	Conventional electricity	Skopje	2005	Power plants	S	A
EVN AD Skopje	Utilities	Conventional electricity	Skopje	2006	Power distribution and supply	P	A
Eurovia DOOEL	Construction	Construction	Tetovo	2010	Construction & Energy	P	A
FAS Sanos	Industrials	Commercial vehicles & trucks	Skopje	1946	Commercial vehicles and transportation	P	A
Komercijalna banka Skopje	Financials	Banks	Skopje	1955	Commercial bank	P	A
Lukoil Macedonia	Oil & gas	Integrated oil & gas	Skopje	2005	Gas stations	P	A
Makedonijapat	Industrials	Transportation services	Skopje	1954	Motorway maintenance	S	A
Makedonski Shumi	Basic materials	Forestry	Skopje	1997	State and private Forestry	S	A
Makedonski Telekom	Telecommunication	Mobile telecommunications	Skopje	1997	Part of Magyar Telekom (Hungary)	P	A
Makpetrol	Oil & gas	Integrated oil & gas	Skopje	1947	Gas stations	P	A
Macedonian Radio Television	Consumer services	Broadcasting & entertainment	Skopje	1941	Public service	P	A
Makedonski Železnici	Industrials	Railroads	Skopje	2007	State-owned railway	S	A
MEPSO	Utilities	Conventional electricity	Skopje	2005	Electric power transmission	S	A
National Bank of North Macedonia	Financials	Banks	Skopje	1991	Central bank	S	A
North Macedonia Post	Industrials	Delivery services	Skopje	1992	Postal services	S	A
A1 Macedonia	Telecommunication	Mobile telecommunications	Skopje	2015	Mobile network	P	A
OKTA	Oil & gas	Exploration & production	Skopje	1982	Oil refinery, Gas stations	P	A
Stopanska Banka	Financials	Banks	Skopje	1944	Commercial Bank	P	A
Teteks	Consumer goods	Clothing & accessories	Tetovo	1951	Textiles, clothing	P	A
Tutunski kombinat Prilep	Consumer goods	Tobacco	Prilep	1873	Tobacco	P	A
Tinex	Consumer services	Food retailers & wholesalers	Skopje	1994	Supermarket chain	P	A
Vardar Film	Consumer services	Broadcasting & entertainment	Skopje	1947	Film	S	A
Veropoulos Skopje	Consumer services	Food retailers & wholesalers	Skopje	1997	Supermarket chain, part of Veropoulos (Greece)	P	A
Vitaminka	Food and beverage	Food processing	Prilep	1956	Domestic producer of food products	P	A

=== Defunct companies ===
Notable companies Status: P=Private, S=State; A=Active, D=Defunct
Name	Industry	Sector	Headquarters	Founded	Notes	Status	
Biserka	Consumer services	Hotels	Kumanovo	1952	Hotels and restaurants, defunct	P	D
Jug Turist	Consumer services	Travel & tourism	Kumanovo	1947	Public transportation, defunct 2013	P	D
Makedonska banka	Financials	Banks	Skopje	1994	Defunct 2006	P	D
Maxi D	Consumer services	Food retailers & wholesalers	Skopje	2004	Discount supermarket chain	P	D
VIP Operator	Telecommunications	Mobile telecommunications	Skopje	2007	Defunct 2016	P	D

== Gallery ==
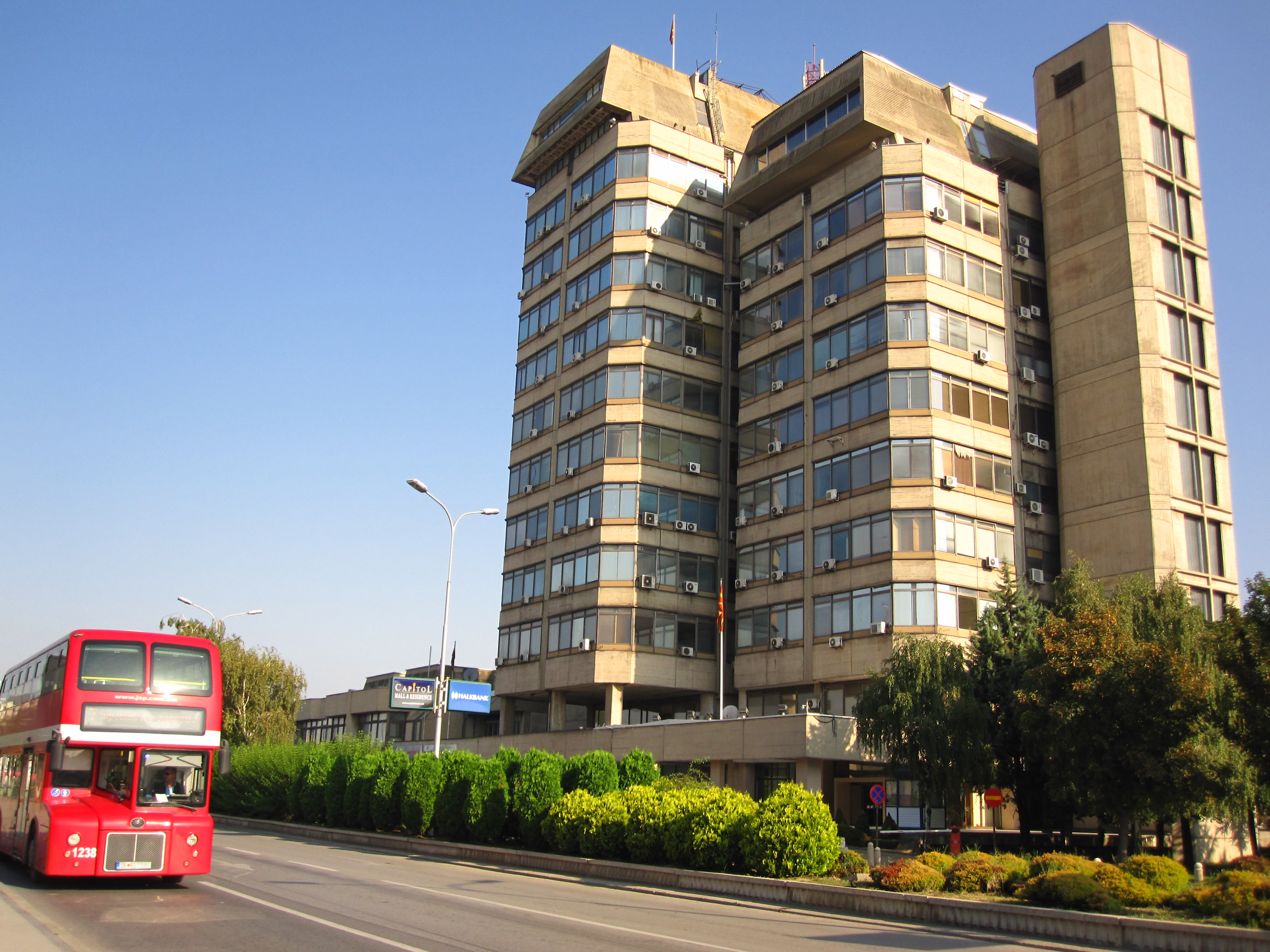
National Bank of North Macedonia headquarters in Skopje.

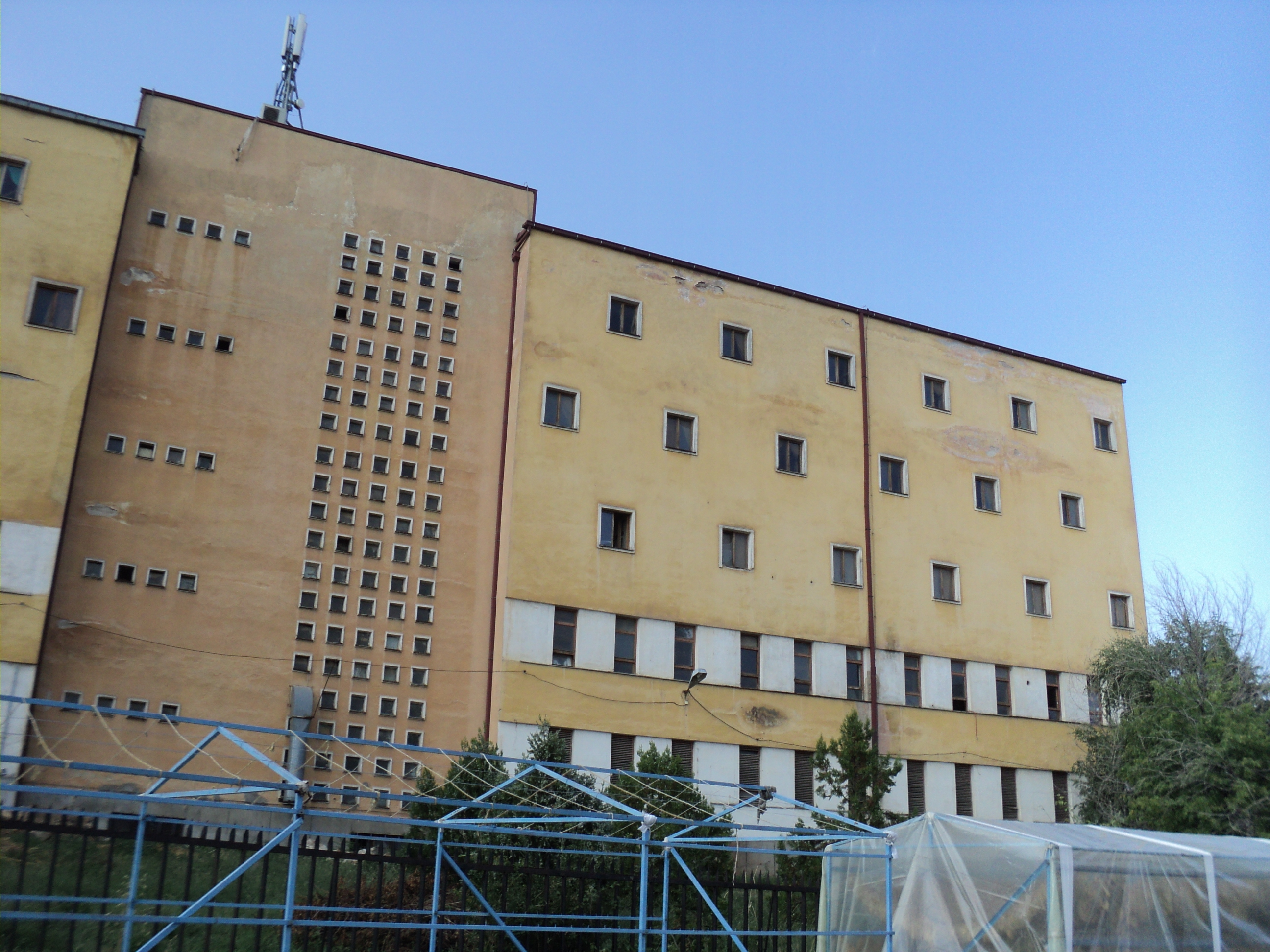
Main building of the Tutunski kombinat Prilep in Prilep.

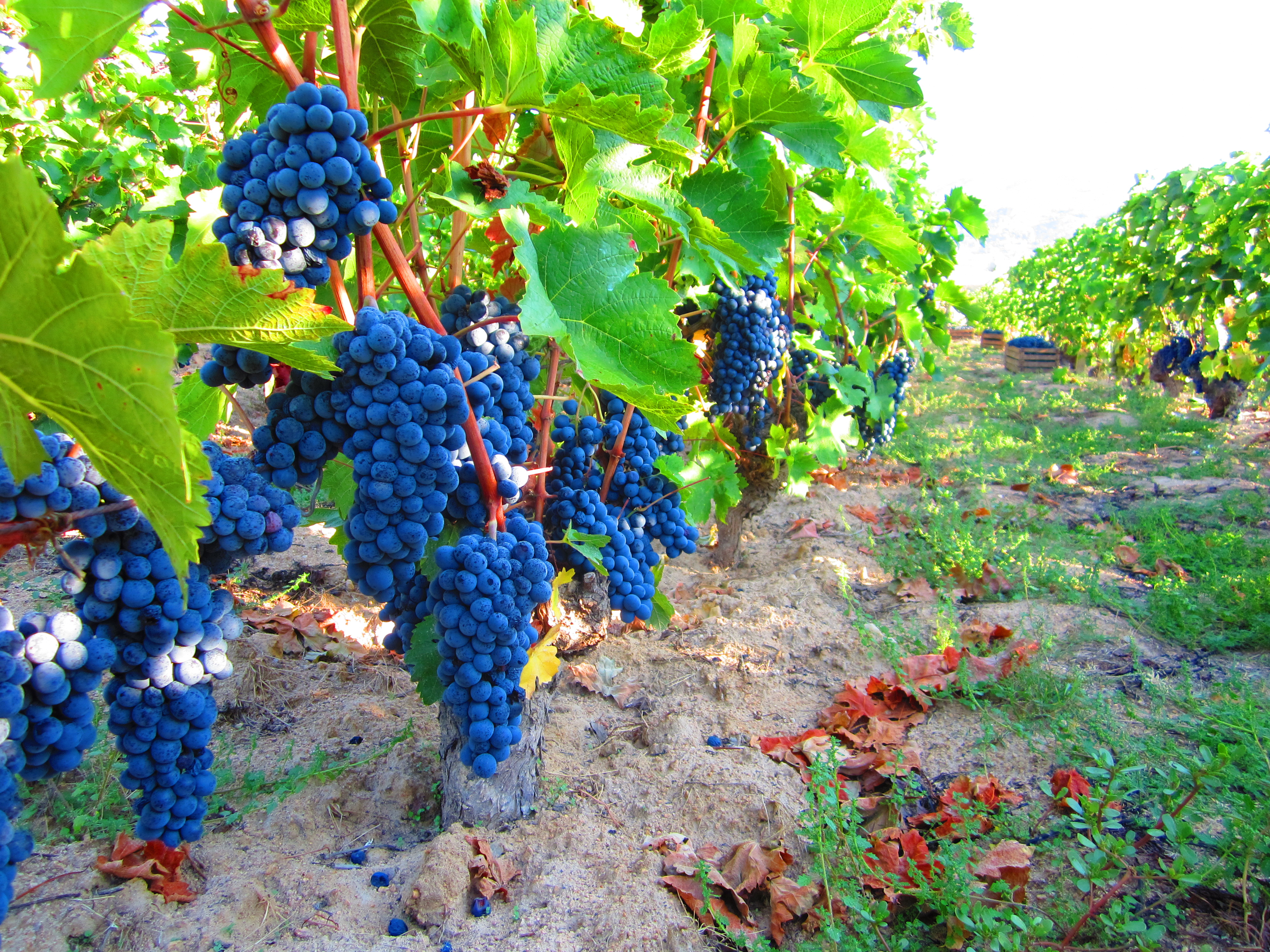
Vineyard in North Macedonia.

== See also ==
- Economy of North Macedonia
- List of banks in North Macedonia
- List of supermarket chains in North Macedonia
- Tourism in North Macedonia
