= List of universities in North Macedonia =

This is a list of universities in North Macedonia.

== Public colleges ==
- Goce Delčev University of Štip
- Ss. Cyril and Methodius University of Skopje
- Mother Teresa University in Skopje
- St. Clement of Ohrid University of Bitola
- State University of Tetova
- University of Information Science and Technology "St. Paul The Apostle"

== Public-Private not-for-profit College ==
- International Balkan University
- South East European University

== Private universities and faculties ==
- Euro-Balkan University
- European University
- FON University
- International Vision University
- International Slavic University G. R. Derzhavin
- International University of Struga
- MIT University Skopje
- South East European University
- University American College Skopje
- University for Audiovisual Arts - European Film Academy ESRA - Skopje
- University of Studies Struga "EuroCollege"
- University of Tourism and Management in Skopje
- Faculty of Business Economy (FBE)
- Euro Collage Kumanovo
- Integrated Business Institute (IBI)
