= 2026 Albanian student protests in North Macedonia =

Protests in North Macedonia

Albanian student protests in North Macedonia
- Date: 6 April 2026–present
- Location: Skopje, North Macedonia
- Caused by: Absence of Albanian in the bar/judicial exam; Alleged violation of the constitution of North Macedonia and Law on the Use of Languages
- Goals: Allow the Albanian language to be used in the judicial exam; Implementation of Albanian language rights
- Status: Ongoing

Parties
Local Albanian students, students from Albania and Kosovo; Democratic Union for Integration; PDIU	(North Macedonia) Macedonian Government

Casualties and losses
3 protesters arrested	None

Protests began in Skopje in April 2026 after local Albanian students made the request for the bar or judicial exam to be taken in the Albanian language alongside the Macedonian one. The government refused, saying that the exam complies with the legal framework. The protests have been also supported by representatives in North Macedonia, Albania and Kosovo.

== Background ==
In 2001, North Macedonia (then the Republic of Macedonia) was in a conflict with the National Liberation Army (UÇK). An issue of the conflict was the restricted use of the Albanian language. The conflict was resolved with the Ohrid Framework Agreement, which expanded language rights by permitting a language spoken by 20% of the population to become co-official at the municipal level alongside Macedonian. The Albanian language has official status in North Macedonia. Albanian law students, who study in Albanian, can only take the legal qualification exam in Macedonian. The students argue that the requirement is discriminatory and violates the constitution of North Macedonia and the Law on the Use of Languages, that the system creates artificial barriers to professional development and undermines the right to equal opportunities. The main demand to the Ministry of Justice is to allow the exam to be taken in Albanian too.

== Events ==
On 6 April 2026, in central Skopje and in front of the Ministry of Justice, law students from the State University of Tetova, the Mother Teresa University, and the South East European University organized a large protest, demanding that the legal qualification exam also be taken in Albanian. The protest was accompanied by chants such as "Albanian language is our right", "We speak Albanian", "There is no state without youth", "Stop institutional discrimination", and the participants used Albanian national symbols.

The Macedonian government wants a panel of experts to resolve the issue. However, students see this as an unnecessary delay. According to participants, the issue is not only about a single qualification, but it is also about the implementation of Albanian language rights. Another protest happened on 18 May in Skopje. The students demanded the resignation of prime minister Hristijan Mickoski and justice minister Igor Filkov. "The Albanian language is identity, the Albanian language is a trust, the Albanian language is not negotiable" was a chant that dominated the march towards the Ministry of Justice. There were also chants of "UÇK". Students from Albania and Kosovo, and members of the Democratic Union for Integration (DUI) also participated in the protest. After a physical fight, three students were arrested by the police.

== Reactions ==
On 6 April, DUI's Secretary General Arbër Ademi said: "If it wasn't in Albanian for the past 30 years, why shouldn't it be today? A request was submitted today and the request was updated today, in fact, there shouldn't even be a request. Today we also see the positions of Filkov, who says that the bar exam is an exam to test language knowledge, and then after two or three weeks, when he sees that he is seriously mistaken, says that it is a professional exam and that it is not an administrative procedure. For both he has lied, the law is clear." On the other hand, VLEN's Bilal Kasami said: "Of course, we support every student protest and as we have stated, from the prime minister and other exponents of the government, we guarantee that this issue will be resolved properly. But it is ironic that the opposition parties, especially DUI, today came out in support of the students, to solve the problems that they left to these students. I can say that I am proud that the students are free to protest, even despite the fact that this issue was guaranteed to be resolved." He also stated: "If legal studies can be completed in Albanian, then judicial exams should follow the same logic."

The Democratic Party of Kosovo, Alliance for the Future of Kosovo, Organization of Kosovo Liberation Army War Veterans, Kosovar politician Vjosa Osmani, Albanologists, local Albanian professors, Albanian politicians Ferit Hoxha and Elisa Spiropali, have expressed support for the protests. The vice-president of DUI, Bujar Osmani, made the accusation that there was an intentional and organized policy to weaken the use of the Albanian language in official institutions.

On 7 April, Mickoski said: "Yesterday we saw a large number of opposition activists at the protest, giving it a political dimension. We informed our NATO and EU allies about this as an attempt by the opposition to destabilize us in a certain way, and I believe this did not meet the approval of senior representatives of the international community." In a Facebook post, Osmani wrote that he had also informed international representatives about attempts by the government "to misrepresent the nature of the student protests by labeling them as politically motivated and creating an inaccurate perception of the reality in the country". The Ministry of Justice argued that the judicial exam is a professional assessment rather than an administrative procedure regulated by language law. Per the ministry, the exam complies with the legal framework.

In a public statement on 17 May, the Party for Justice, Integration and Unity (PDIU) expressed support for the right of ethnic Albanians in North Macedonia to receive education in their mother tongue. The party stated that Albanian-language education was a fundamental right rather than a privilege and argued that this right had been secured through historical struggles and sacrifices. PDIU called on academics, intellectuals, parents, students, and members of the Albanian community to support protests concerning the condition of Albanian-language education in North Macedonia. The party further stated that remaining silent in the face of what it described as injustices and the degradation of education in the Albanian language would amount to complicity.

VLEN accused DUI of encouraging the protests and politically exploiting the problem. On the other hand, DUI openly supported the students and accused Albanian governmental ministers of being unable to defend the rights of their fellow Albanians. Before the protest on 18 May, Filkov said that the debate is closed. Social Democratic Union of Macedonia's president Venko Filipče said that the students' demands are legitimate and accused Mickoski of intentionally creating interethnic tensions to distract the public from the main issues, such as the blocking of the country's European Union path. The president of the Democratic Union, Pavle Trajanov, said the presence of citizens from Albania and Kosovo is an impermissible attempt at external influence on the internal political and institutional issues of the country.
