= List of supermarket chains in North Macedonia =

This is a list of all the supermarkets in North Macedonia.

== Supermarkets ==
Name	Stores	First store in North Macedonia	Parent
ALDA	9	2019	Alda Marketi
KAM	71	1999	KAM Holding
Elida	18	1993	Elida Marketi
Kipper	130	2011	Kipper Market
Lidl	0	2027	Lidl
Ramstore	21	2005	Migros Türk
Stokomak	77	1997	Stokomak
Tinex	38	1994	Tinex
SPAR	62	2026	SPAR Macedonia
TUŠ Macedonia	3	?	TUŠ
Veropoulos Skopje	9	1997	Veropoulos
Zito	52	1988	Zito

Former:

- Carrefour

== Bio / Eco stores ==
Name	Stores	First store in North Macedonia	Parent
Vitalia	4	1993	Vitalia Healthy Food

== Specialty store chains ==
=== Clothing ===
Name	Stores	First store in North Macedonia	Parent
Celio	1	?	Celio
Geox	1	?	Geox
Hugo Boss	1	?	Hugo Boss
Lacoste	1	?	Lacoste
Mango	1	?	Mango
NewYorker	2	?	NewYorker
Springfield	3	?	Springfield
Timberland	2	?	The Timberland Company
Stipko	2	1991	Stipko
Zara Macedonia	2	?	Zara
H&M Macedonia	3	2022	H&M
LC Waikiki Macedonia	10	2013	LC Waikiki

=== Home improvement and furniture ===
Name	Stores	First store in North Macedonia	Parent
Divano stil	2	?	Divano stil
Forma Nova	3	?	Teha Grupacija
Gir Rig	3	1994	Gir Rig
Jugoeksport stil	3	1990	Jugoeksport stil
JYSK Macedonia - SCM	3	?	JYSK
Mebel Vi	7	1997	Mebel Vi
Prima mebel	10	2010	Prima mebel
Simpo Makedonija	11	1963	Simpo Group
Treska Mebel	2	1972	Treska Mebel Trejd
Vardar Mebel	5	1990	Vardar Mebel

=== Sport equipment ===
Name	Stores	First store in North Macedonia	Parent
Delta Sport	4	?	Delta Holding
Intersport	4	?	Intersport
Master Sport	2	1996	Master Sport
Mega Sport	12	1974	Mega Sport
Runners	4	?	Runners
Sport M	13	2004	Sport M
Sport Reality	2	?	Sport Reality
Sport Vision	14	1996	Sport Vision

=== Footwear ===
Name	Stores	First store in North Macedonia	Parent
Bata	2	?	Fashion Company
Biana Shoes	2	1993	Biana Shoes
Peko	13	1992	Peko
Skechers	1	?	Skechers

=== Consumer electronics ===
Name	Stores	First store in North Macedonia}	Parent
Agrotehna	11	1990	Agrotehna
Anhoch	19	1994	Anhoch PC Market
Neptun	25	1998	Neptun Makedonija DOO
Niko Computers	4	?	Niko Computers
Setec	18	1993	Setec
Tehnomarket	13	2003	Tehnomarket

=== Pharmacies ===
Name	Stores	First store in North Macedonia	Parent
Zegin	170	1989	Zegin
Eurofarm	120		

=== Drugstores ===
Name	Stores	First store in North Macedonia	Parent
DM	13	2012	dm-drogerie markt

=== Chocolate ===
Name	Stores	First store in North Macedonia	Parent
Kraskomerc	3	1991	Kras
Evropa	6	1882	Evropa

=== Books and media ===
Name	Stores	First store in North Macedonia	Parent
Jugoton	1	1990	Jugoton
Kultura	?	1945	Kultura
Prosvetno Delo	22	1945	Prosvetno Delo
Tri	2	1999	Tri

=== Jewelry, goldsmith & watch stores ===
Name	Stores	First store in North Macedonia	Parent
Risteski	5	1954	Risteski Pearls
Royal House Group	3	2006	Royal House Group

=== Petrol stations ===
Name	Stores	First store in North Macedonia	Parent
Detoil	7	1993	Detoil
Lukoil Makedonija	27	2006	Lukoil
Makpetrol	127	1947	Makpetrol
OKTA	22	1978	Hellenic Petroleum

=== Fast food chains ===
Name	Stores	First store in North Macedonia	Parent
Burger King	7	2012	Burger King
Domino's	4	2011	Domino's
Goody's	3	?	Goody's
Mekicite od Straza	1	1942	
KFC	5	2018	KFC

Former:

- McDonald's
