= Ilan Sadeh =

Israeli computer scientist

- אילן שדה
- Born: June 1, 1953 (age 73)

Ilan Sadeh (Hebrew: אילן שדה; born June 1, 1953) is an Israeli IT theoretician, entrepreneur, and human rights activist. He holds the position of Associate Professor of Computer Sciences and Mathematics at the University for Information Science and Technology "St. Paul The Apostle" in Ohrid, North Macedonia.

== Biography ==
=== Background and activities ===
Sadeh has argued that the State of Israel should not be regarded as the representative of Holocaust survivors. Sadeh has criticized the actions of some Zionist organizations and the JDC during WWII, alleging inadequate assistance to European Jews, instead prioritizing the needs of the Yishuv in Palestine.

The situation in Israel brought Sadeh to the conclusion that the political system must be replaced. He entered politics and led a movement in behalf of Holocaust survivors. He published a few articles in Israeli newspapers and prompted public responses.

=== Mathematical background and Sadeh's contribution ===
- The asymptotic equipartition property (AEP) or "Shannon–McMillan–Breiman theorem" is a general property of the output samples of a stochastic source and is the basis of Information Theory. It is fundamental to the concept of typical sequences used in theories of coding theory. AEP was first introduced by Shannon (1948), proved in weak convergence by McMillan (1953) and later refined to strong convergence by Breiman (1957, 1960).
- Shannon Theorems are based on AEP. Shannon provided in 1959 the first source-compression coding theorems. But neither he nor his successors could present any algorithm that attains Shannon bound.
1. Only in 1990, Ornstein and Shields have proposed an algorithm that attains Shannon bound. They proved the convergence to Shannon bound known as "rate-distortion function". But their algorithm is far from being useful and assumes a-priori knowledge of source distribution.
- In Sadeh's Ph.D. research (1990–1992) he proposed a universal algorithm that attains Shannon bound. That is, it does not require a priori knowledge of source distribution and asymptotically has some computational advantages. The algorithm is a generalization and merging of Ornstein Shields Algorithm and Wiener Ziv Algorithm (1989).
- When he tried to prove convergence to Shannon bound, known also as "Rate Distortion Function", he realized that he could not rely on AEP or Shannon McMillan Breiman Theory.
- So in 1992, he presented and proved a new "Limit Theorem" and named it "Lossy AEP" or "Extended Shannon McMillan Breiman Theorem".
- That means that the basis of "Information theory" has been extended and generalized.
- From that moment he has clashes with Israeli academics: two of them submitted two very negative reviews to Math School in Tel Aviv University, stating that the Limit Theorem is wrong, and prevented the granting of his PhD in 1993 until 1996. Only after a long fight did he receive his PhD, almost three years after the submission of his dissertation.
- Sadeh applied for patents in Israel (1992) and USA (1993) and got Israeli and USA Patents.
- The Israeli American Clique influenced upon the systematic rejection of Sadeh's papers by IEEE.
- He has been invited and presented his results in a few conferences all over the world, including the IEEE Conference at Vancouver Canada 1995.

== Research and development activities ==
Ilan Sadeh has had pioneering results in a few research and developments fields: "Smart camera," a long time before September 11 events, and "Homeland Security" projects, New Video compression, military applications for surveillance, seismic data processing and others.

Sadeh has established three start up companies: Meitav, Israel (1982), Visnet (1996) and Vipeg (2000). He has been intensively involved in establishing and R&D of new start-up companies, establishing the infrastructure, dealing with intellectual property issues, managing all activities, raising funding, coordinating consortium in EU FP5 FP6 programs.

Citing difficulties in obtaining institutional and commercial support, Sadeh left Israel in 2006 and moved to North Macedonia in 2011.

== Scientific achievements ==
- He published work on limit theorems related to the "Shannon–McMillan–Breiman theorem" (1992). These results relate to core topics in information theory. He applied Compression Algorithms based on Approximate String Matching.
- He presented performance analysis based on large deviations theory (LDT) and presented the trade-off between compression rate, distortion level, and probability of error.
- He proposed a new universal coding scheme ("Sadeh Algorithm") based on approximate string matching, Wiener Ziv Algorithm and Ornstein–Shields block-coding algorithm (1992).

== Publications ==
- I. Sadeh – "On Approximate String Matching"

IEEE Computer Society Data Compression Committee on Computer Communications 3, pp. 148–158 (1993). Universal algorithms for data compression.

- I. Sadeh – "Operational rate distortion theory"

Journal of Applied Mathematics and Computer Science 5 (1), pp. 139–169 (1995).

He presented performance analysis based on LDT (Large Deviations Theory) and presented the trade-off between compression rate, distortion level and probability of error.

- I. Sadeh – "Universal data compression based on approximate string matching,"

Journal of Applied Mathematics and Computer Science 5 (4), pp. 717–742 (1995).

Convergence Theorems of Universal algorithms for data compression.

- I. Sadeh – "The rate distortion region for coding in stationary systems,"

Journal of Applied Mathematics and Computer Science 6 (1), pp. 101–114 (1996).

The exact bound relations between rates, distortion levels in multiple description system. The results are expansions of Shannon's bounds for multiterminal network.

- I. Sadeh, A. Kazelman, M. Zak, "Universal voice compression algorithms based on approximate string matching,"

Journal of Applied Mathematics and Computer Science December 1995.

Presented sub-optimal universal coding schemes for voice coding.

- I. Sadeh, "Bounds on Data Compression Ratio with a given Error Probability,"

Probability in the Engineering and Informational Sciences

Editor: Sheldon Ross, Cambridge University Press, 12 1998 pp. 189–210. Presented the first application of Large Deviation Theory approach to the asymptotic expansions of Shannon's bounds.

- I. Sadeh, "Universal-algorithm and theorems on approximate String matching,"

Probability in the Engineering and Informational Sciences
Editor: Sheldon Ross, Cambridge University Press,

He was the first to generalize Shannon McMillan Breiman Theorem (Lossy AEP).

He found important Limit Theorems. These theorems were "re-invented" by a member of the "Israeli Clique".

- I. Sadeh, P. Novikov, M. Kaufman, "Gray scale movie compression based on approximate string matching,"

Image Processing and Communications, March 1996.

Presented sub-optimal universal coding schemes for video coding.

- I. Sadeh, "Polynomial approximation of images",

Computers and Mathematics with Applications, February 1996.

Presented a novel method for Image Coding based on Polynomial approximation of images. Theoretical and practical results were presented.

- I. Sadeh, "Properties of image coding by polynomial representation,"

Image Processing and Communications, March 1996.

More theoretical and practical results about Image Coding based on Polynomial approximation of images.

- I. Sadeh, "Digital Data Compression in Computer Networks,"

Ph.D. Dissertation, School of Mathematical Sciences, Tel Aviv University, June 1993.

- I. Sadeh, A. Averbuch "Bounds on parallel computation of multivariate polynomials" Proceedings on Theory of computing and systems. Published Springer-Verlag London, UK 1992, pages: 147–153

He found theoretical bounds on parallel computation of multivariate polynomial.

- I. Sadeh "Optimal Data Compression Algorithm"

Computers and Mathematics with Applications, September 1996, pages 57–72

He found important Limit Theorems for Approximate String Matching for data compression and practical sub optimal results.

- I. Sadeh "On digital data compression – the asymptotic large deviations approach " Proceedings of the conference on Information Sciences and Systems 1992 Princeton university.

Presentation of Large Deviation Theory approach to the asymptotic expansions of Shannon's data compression bounds.

- I. Sadeh "The rate distortion region for coding in stationary systems,"

Journal of Applied Mathematics and Computer Science 1996 pp. 123–136

He presented new limit theorems for multiterminal systems and presented a new approach to the degraded diversity system problem.

- I. Sadeh, "Polynomial approximation of images,"

Computers and Mathematics with Applications, February 1996

New theoretical and practical results about Image Coding based on Polynomial approximation of images.

- I. Sadeh "Image encoding by polynomial approximation"

Proceedings of the conference on Information Sciences and Systems 1992 Princeton University Conference paper – New theoretical and practical results about Image Coding based on Polynomial approximation of images.

- I. Sadeh "Universal compression algorithms based on approximate string matching". Proceedings of the IEEE Information Theory Conference 1995 Vancouver Canada p. 84

Conference paper – he showed by using the extended Kac's Lemma, that the compression rate, asymptotically achieved by the "Sadeh Algorithm", converges in probability to Shannon's bound. The algorithm has been patented in the USA and Israel.

- I. Sadeh "Operational rate distortion theory"

Proceedings of the IEEE Information Theory Conference 1995 Vancouver Canada, 196. Presentation in Conference of First Large Deviation Theory approach to the asymptotic expansions of Shannon's data compression bounds.

- I. Sadeh, "Approximate String Matching with applications to Universal Compression". Proceedings of the Conference on Control and Information at Hong Kong. Chinese University Press. 1995 pp 311 – 316

Conference paper – I have shown that the compression rate, asymptotically achieved by the "Sadeh Algorithm", converges in probability to Shannon's bound.

- I. Sadeh, "Operational Rate Distortion Theory"

Proceedings of the Conference on Control and Information at Hong Kong Chinese University Press. 1995 pp. 305–310 Presentation in Conference of Large Deviation Theory approach to the asymptotic expansions of Shannon's theoretical bounds.

- I. Sadeh "Methods and means for image and voice compression".

US patent 5836003 He had shown that the compression rate, asymptotically achieved by the "Sadeh Algorithm", converges in probability to Shannon's bound and showed suboptimal applications.

- I. Sadeh US Patent 6018303

He have shown that the compression rate, asymptotically achieved by the "Sadeh Algorithm", converges in probability to Shannon's bound and showed suboptimal applications.

- I. Sadeh, Israel Patent no. 103080.

Video and Voice coding algorithms.

- I. Sadeh "Vehicle Navigation System" US Patent 4,593,359, 1986

A method and means for Tank Navigation. The method is operational even in severe electromagnetic environments, based on Sadeh's experience as Armored Forces Officer in Israel Army.
