= Komunalna Banka =

Komunalna Banka was the name of several banks in Yugoslavia, generally created in 1955 at the local level when the country exited its strict monobank system. It may refer to:

- Komunalna Banka Kragujevac
- Komunalna Banka Skopje

== See also ==
- List of banks in Yugoslavia
