= Alpha Bank Skopje =

Alpha Bank's North Macedonia subsidiary

- Company type: Bank
- Industry: Finance
- Founded: 1993
- Headquarters: Skopje, Republic of North Macedonia
- Products: Commercial banking
- Owner: Silk Road Capital (100%)
- Website: alphabank.com.mk

Alpha Bank Skopje (full name: Alpha Bank AD Skopje) is the subsidiary of the Greek bank Alpha Bank in North Macedonia.

In 1999, Alpha Bank officially agreed to the purchase of a 65% stake in the Macedonian Kreditna Banka. In 2002, Alpha Bank, Athens acquired the minority stake and changed its name to Alpha Bank Skopje.

== History ==
In April 1993, one of the first private Banks of the country was established, then named Kreditna Banka AD Skopje.

In January 2000, Alpha Bank, Athens acquired the majority stake in the Bank and became the main shareholder.

In April 2002, the Bank was renamed into Alpha Bank AD Skopje, following Alpha Bank Group worldwide policy.

In August 2002, Alpha Bank, Athens acquired the minority stake and became the sole shareholder in Alpha Bank AD Skopje, accounting for 100% of its share capital.

== See also ==
- List of banks
- List of banks in North Macedonia
