= State University of Tetova =

University in Tetovo, North Macedonia

- Universiteti i Tetovës; Универзитет во Тетово
- Type: Public
- Established: 17 December 1994; 31 years ago
- Rector: Prof. Dr. Jusuf Zejneli
- Students: 7,097 (2018–19)
- Location: Tetovo, North Macedonia; 42°N 20.9667°E
- Campus: Urban
- Colors: Red and Yellow
- Website: www.unite.edu.mk

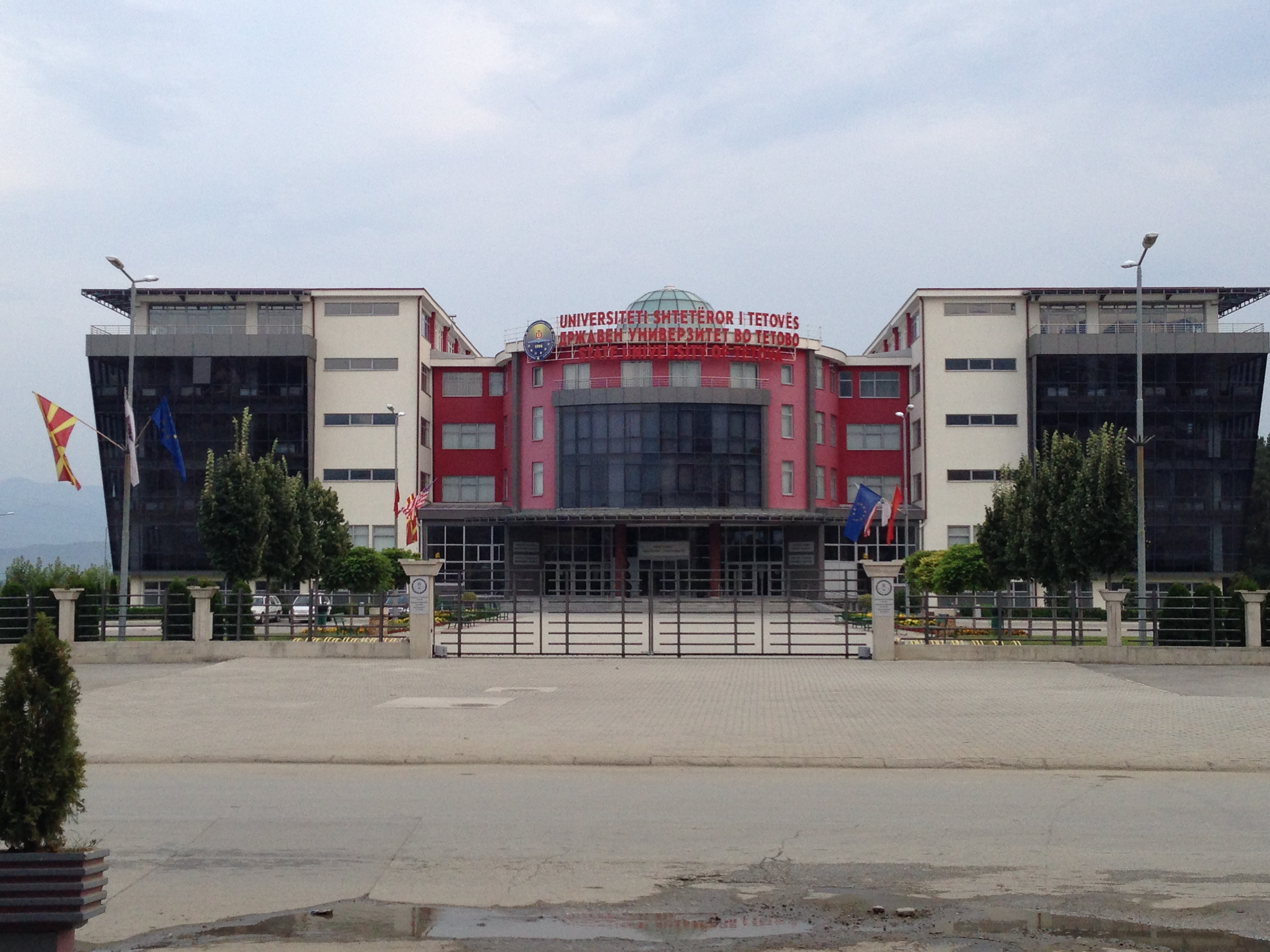
- View of the campus building, August 2015

The State University of Tetova (Albanian: Universiteti Shtetëror i Tetovës; Macedonian: Државен Универзитет во Тетово) is a public university in North Macedonia. The university was established on 17 December 1994 as the first Albanian-language higher education institution in Macedonia, though not recognized as a state university by the national government until January 2004. As of 2018–19 academic year, 7,097 students are enrolled at the university.

== History ==
The State University of Tetova was founded on 17 December 1994 by Albanians, without government approval. The Macedonian authorities had previously rejected an application by Albanians of Tetovo for permission to establish a university with education in Albanian. The first lectures were held on 16–17 February 1995, in Poroj and Rečica. The first rector was Fadil Sulejmani from Bozovce. After North Macedonia's independence, it was the first institution that permitted Albanians to receive higher education entirely in the Albanian language. To prevent the university from opening, the Macedonian police used force, which resulted in nineteen people being seriously injured and the death of an Albanian man. Sulejmani and his colleagues were imprisoned. The university was able to continue organizing lectures but its credentials and degrees were not recognized in the country. On 17 December 1996, the local assembly of Tetovo decided to sponsor the university. The operation of the university was approved by Macedonia's Albanian political parties. The Macedonian parliament passed a law to legalize the university on 21 January 2004 with 68 votes (26 votes from Albanian deputies), while it was opposed by VMRO-DPMNE deputies. In the academic year 2004–2005, it became the third state university in the country.

The university was at the center of a forged diploma scandal throughout the 2000s and early 2010s. In neighboring Albania, diploma mills were selling forged diplomas on the street for between 500 and 800 euros, with diplomas coming from the State University of Tetovo a popular choice, given that the university was outside the remit of Albania's official institutions. The State University of Tetova rector claimed that former students who had not completed their studies were purchasing these forged diplomas, with forged diplomas even being sold in Kosovo and Montenegro. In 2021, at least seven professors from the medical faculty of the university were accused of engaging in academic dishonesty, allegedly plagiarizing and copying scientific works.

== Faculties and departments ==
The university consists of eleven faculties:

- Faculty of Economics
- Faculty of Law
- Faculty of Applied Sciences
- Faculty of Fine Arts
- Faculty of Philosophy
- Faculty of Philology
- Faculty of Medicine
- Faculty of Natural Sciences and Mathematics
- Faculty of Food Technology
- Faculty of Physical Education
- Faculty of Business Administration
- Faculty of Agriculture and Biotechnology
- Faculty of Pedagogy

== See also ==
- Balkan Universities Network
