= Makedonska banka =

Former bank in North Macedonia

Makedonska banka (formerly Ljubljanska banka) was the third largest bank in Macedonia after Stopanska Banka and Komercijalna Banka. The bank underwent the change from the Ljubljanska Banka in December 1994. Marjan Bojadziev was CEO of the bank from 1994 to 1999.

From 2006, Makedonska banka became defunct.
