= Marjan Bojadžiev =

Macedonian economist

Marjan Bojadziev
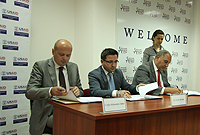
- Marjan Bojadziev (right)

President of the Chamber of Commerce
- In office 1994–1998

CEO of the Macedonian Bank
- In office 1999–2004

Rector of the University American College of Skopje
- Incumbent
- Assumed office 2010
- Website: bojadjiev.info

Marjan Bojadžiev (Macedonian: Марјан Бојаџиев, born 18 June 1967) is a Macedonian economist who was president of the Chamber of Commerce from 1994 to 1999 and as CEO of the then third largest bank in the Republic of Macedonia (now North Macedonia), the Makedonska banka (Macedonian Bank), from 1999 to 2004. He is on the board of the Chamber of Commerce of the city of Skopje, advising on economics and the running of the city.

Bojadžiev has served as manager of companies in North Macedonia, as a board member in professional organizations and as a moderator in conferences on national Macedonian energy and investment policies.

== Biography ==
=== Education ===
Bojadžiev has a Ph.D. in Economics from the Economic Institute in Skopje. He earned his MS degree (2000) and bachelor's degree (1991) from University Ciril and Methodius, Faculty of Economics. He studied for a specialist diploma in International Business Management at the University of Trieste and at New York City University. He has a master's degree in economics, with a specialization in marketing. He took executive education courses at Harvard Business School in 2008 and at the University of Maastricht in 2009. In 2011 he received a Certified Management Consultant (CMC) certificate.

=== Financial management ===
From 1994 to 1999, he was chairman of the board of directors of Macedonian Money Market and from 1994 to 1999 as president of the Association of Savings Houses of the Chamber of Commerce. At this time he was also CEO of Inter Falco Savings House (1993–1996), as well as Macedonian Savings House (1996–1999). Bojadžiev was the CEO of the third largest bank in North Macedonia, Makedonska banka, from 1999 to 2004. Marjan Bojadžiev was the Managing Director in InterGate Computers during 1996. In 2003 it was reported that the Makedonska banka had lost money three years in a row and was in difficulty, with the shareholders of 2002 losing 5.7 million euros. Bojadžiev reportedly refused to communicate with the media over the financial difficulties. In 2007, it was reported, three years after Bojadžiev departed from his position in the bank that the running of the bank was "being destroyed by political games". Bojadžiev had reportedly been the only one who had denied that the bank had a party connection.

Bojadžiev was dean of the School of Business Administration of University American College Skopje; he became provost in 2006 and rector in 2010. His first engagement as a lecturer was in the period 2002-2004 when he taught Strategic Management and Marketing lectures at the New York College in Skopje.

On 12 July 2010 he signed the Memorandum of Understanding for the Report on Foreign Trade of North Macedonia with Aleksandar Shahov, Director of the USAID Business Environment Activity (BEA). Bojadžiev has served as a moderator on subjects related to the national economy and in conferences discussing the energy investments in the country and served as a moderator in a national energy conference in October 2010 as part of Macedonia Energy Week 2010. As rector, he attended the Fifth Annual International Conference on European Integration in 2011 in Skopje. As of 2016 he is a visiting professor in Tor Vergata, in Rome, Italy. As of January, 2017 he serves as Honorary Consul of Hungary in Ohrid, South-West North Macedonia. His term as a rector ended in 2018, afterwards he served as a provost at UACS.
