= Fadil Sulejmani =

Albanian university professor from North Macedonia (1940–2013)

Fadil Sulejmani (Macedonian: Фадил Сулејмани; 5 December 1940 – 11 February 2013) was an Albanologist, university professor and the first rector of the University of Tetova.

== Life ==
Fadil Sulejmani was born on 5 December 1940, in the village of Bozovce. He completed his primary and secondary education in Tetovo and pursued higher education in Pristina and Belgrade. Upon returning from his studies, he worked as a teacher and later as a professor at various educational institutions in Pristina and Tetovo.

In 1995, Sulejmani established the University of Tetova along with other Albanian intellectuals, the first institution of higher education in the Albanian language in North Macedonia. He served as its rector. In 17 February, Sulejmani was arrested by the Macedonian police. He was sentenced to two years in prison but was later released. He died in 2013.

== Publications ==
- "E mbsuame e krështerë e Lekë Matrëngës", 1979, OCLC 254973905
- "Praktikumi i gjuhës së sotme shqipe", 1984, OCLC 488067120
- "Lindja, martesa dhe vdekja në Malësitë e Tetovës", 1988, OCLC 54902035
- "Veçoritë dialektore në të folmen e Sharrit të Tetovës", 1990, OCLC 439978203
- "Njohuri për Gjermaninë dhe popullin e saj", 1995, OCLC 255234164
- "Fonetika e gjuhës gjermane", 1995, OCLC 255234252
- "Morfologjia e gjuhës gjermane", 1995, OCLC 255233982
- "E folmja e Malësisë së Sharrit të Tetovës", 2006, OCLC 643509766
