= Aktiva =

AKTIVA ENGINEERING
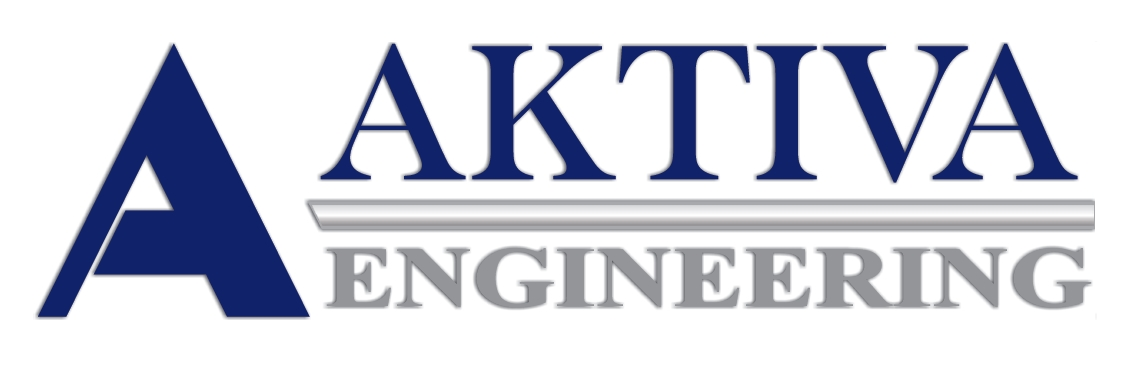
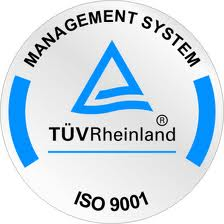
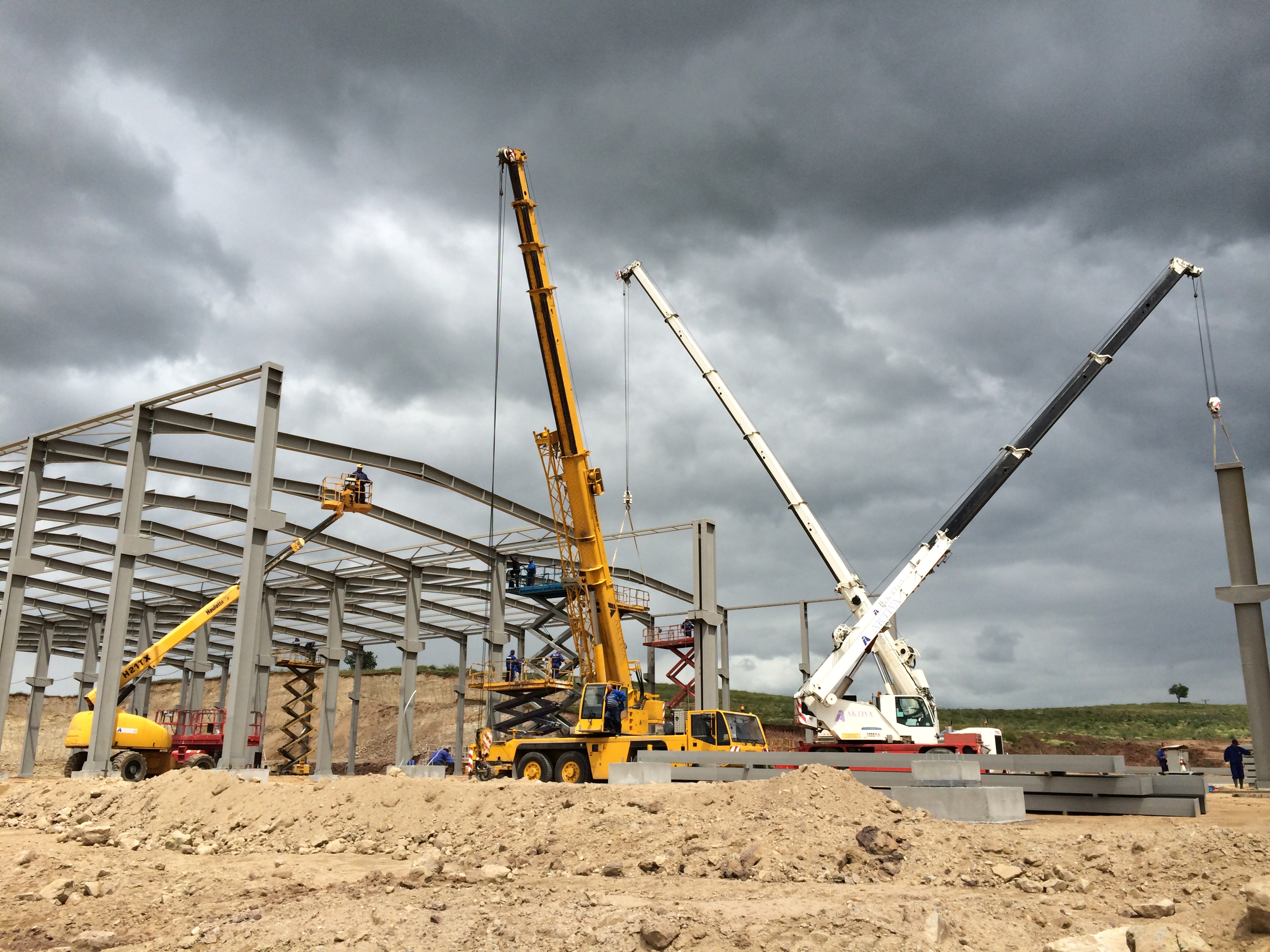
- Company type: Private, Ltd
- Industry: Steel construction
- Founded: 1999
- Headquarters: Štip, Republic of North Macedonia
- Products: Steel buildings, Metal processing, Water supply and sanitation, Tanks and equipment, Engineering services
- Website: http://www.activa.mk/

AKTIVA ENGINEERING is a Macedonian construction company that specializes in metal structures. Its services include general design, supervision, and construction of buildings. AKTIVA Engineering was founded in 1999.
