= Maxi D =

Macedonian discount supermarket chain

- Company type: discount supermarket chain
- Industry: Retail
- Founded: 2004
- Defunct: 2018
- Headquarters: Skopje, North Macedonia
- Products: supermarkets grocery stores
- Parent: Skopski pazar AD Skopje
- Website: www.maxid.com.mk

Maxi D was a Macedonian discount supermarket chain, a part of the Skopski pazar AD Skopje company. The company also owned the supermarket chain SP market. Skopski pazar's supermarket chain was one of the biggest in the Republic of North Macedonia.

The discounts Maxi D were the first product that Skopski pazar AD Skopje exported outside Skopje and Maxi D became the fastest growing brand of the company. Maxi D went out of business in 2018.

== Locations ==
Maxi D has established itself in 5 stores in:

- Skopje

== Slogans ==
- Supermarkets: "Welcome neighbor" "More pleasure"
- Discounts: "Maxi D - my true friend"

== See also ==
- SP market
- Skopski pazar AD Skopje
- Restaurant 14
- SP Planet
