= Makedonski Shumi =

Nacionalni šumi
- Company type: Public
- Founded: December 15, 1997; 28 years ago in Skopje, Republic of Macedonia (now Republic of North Macedonia)
- Founder: Government of North Macedonia
- Headquarters: Skopje, North Macedonia
- Key people: Zoran Gjorgjiev
- Owner: Government of North Macedonia
- Number of employees: 2,231 (2014)
- Website: mkdsumi.com.mk

Nacionalni Shumi (Macedonian: Национални Шуми) ("National Forests") is a public company from North Macedonia. It was founded on December 15, 1997 and started to work on 1 July 1998.

== Symbol and Logo ==
A symbol has appeared on a filed in the village of Karabinci in Republic of North Macedonia. It was unclear what was this symbol but the Director of the Makedonski šumi Žarko Karadžoski at the time in 2012 has announces that it was the new logo of the company. He also announced the new company slogan: In partnership with nature.
