= St. Clement of Ohrid University of Bitola =

Public university in North Macedonia

University St. Kliment Ohridski in Bitola
- Универзитет "Св. Климент Охридски" Битола
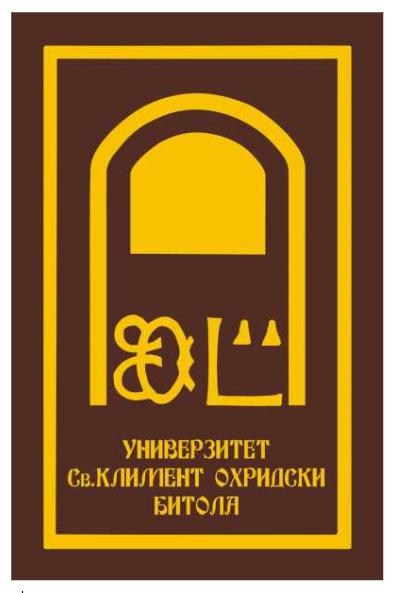
- Type: Public
- Established: 25 April 1979; 47 years ago
- Rector: Igor Nedelkovski
- Academic staff: 374
- Administrative staff: 193
- Students: 4,139 (2018–19)
- Location: Bitola, Republic of North Macedonia; 41°01′55″N 21°18′53″E
- Website: www.uklo.edu.mk

University rankings

Regional – Overall
- QS Emerging Europe and Central Asia: 351-400 (2022)

The University St. Kliment Ohridski in Bitola (Macedonian: Универзитет „Св. Климент Охридски" - Битола, romanized: Univerzitet "Sv. Kliment Ohridski") is a public university in North Macedonia. Headquartered in Bitola, it also has faculties in Prilep, Ohrid, Veles, Kichevo and Skopje. It was founded on 25 April 1979, but the name of St. Clement of Ohrid was not given until late 1994. As of 2018–19 school year, a total of 4,139 students are enrolled at the university.

The act of the formal establishment of the university of Bitola was on 25 April 1979. The 1970s was a decade of exponential rise in number of higher education institutions in the former Yugoslavia when alongside Bitola many other universities across the country were opened.

== Organization ==
A Self-Managing Agreement for joining into the University of Bitola was signed by six higher education institutions and two research institutes, namely:

- Faculty of Economics – Prilep
- Faculty of Law – Bitola
- Faculty of Technical Sciences – Bitola
- Faculty of Tourism and Catering – Ohrid
- Higher School of Agriculture - Bitola
- Academy of Pedagogy- Bitola
- Tobacco Institute – Prilep
- Institute of Hydro-biology- Ohrid

The following institutions have since joined the university:

- Institute for Old Slav Culture – Prilep (1985)
- National and University Library "St.Kliment Ohridski" – Biota (1980)
- Student Center "Koch Racin" – Bitola (1981)
- Higher Medical School – Bitola (1988)
- Police Academy – Skopje (2004)

The international character of UKLO is confirmed by the participation in international programs and associations among which the most significant is the membership in EUA and BUA. St. Clement of Ohrid University is also a holder of the Erasmus+ Charter.

== Study fields ==
Natural Sciences

- Computer & information sciences

Engineering & Technology

- Transport engineering
- Electrical, electronic and information engineering
- Communication engineering and systems
- Applied engineering (environmental protection)
- Mechanical Engineering
- Mechatronics
- Graphic Engineering

Medical & Health Sciences

- Nursing
- Nutrition (gastronomy)
- Dietetics
- Health care (midwifery, physiotherapy, radiology, medical laboratory)
- Forensic science

Agricultural Sciences

- Agricultural biotechnology and food biotechnology
- Animal products processing
- Agronomy, plant breeding and plant protection
- Veterinary science

Social Sciences

- Economics and Business (finances, management, banking, accounting, auditing, marketing, insurance)
- Educational sciences
- Law
- Tourism and hospitality
- Security
- Political sciences
- Organization science and management

Humanities

- Languages
- Literature

== Members ==
12 higher education institutions (10 faculties, 1 higher school, 1 scientific institute)

4 accompanying units:

- Faculty of Economics – Prilep
- Faculty of Technical Sciences – Bitola
- Faculty of Biotechnical Sciences
- Faculty of Education – Bitola
- Faculty of Veterinary Medicine – Bitola
- Faculty of Information and Communication Technologies – Bitola
- Faculty of Tourism and Hospitality – Ohrid
- Faculty of Security – Skopje
- Faculty of Law – Kichevo
- Faculty of Technology and Technical Sciences – Veles
- Higher Medical School – Bitola
- Faculty of Information and Communication Technologies – Bitola
- Tobacco institute – Prilep

Accompanying units

- Hydro-biological institute – Ohrid
- Institute for Ancient Slav literature
- National Institution University Library "St.Kliment Ohridski"
- Students’ residence "Kocho Racin" – Bitola

== International research journal – Horizons ==
Horizons is an international research journal of St. Clement of Ohrid University published in two series depending on the research areas: Series A in the area of social sciences and humanities, and Series B in the area of natural sciences and mathematics, engineering and technology, biotechnology, medicine and health sciences. The journal is EBSCO classified.

== See also ==
- Balkan Universities Network
- List of universities in the Republic of North Macedonia
- List of colleges and universities
- Bitola
