= Bozovce =

Bozovce Бозовце Bozoc
- Village
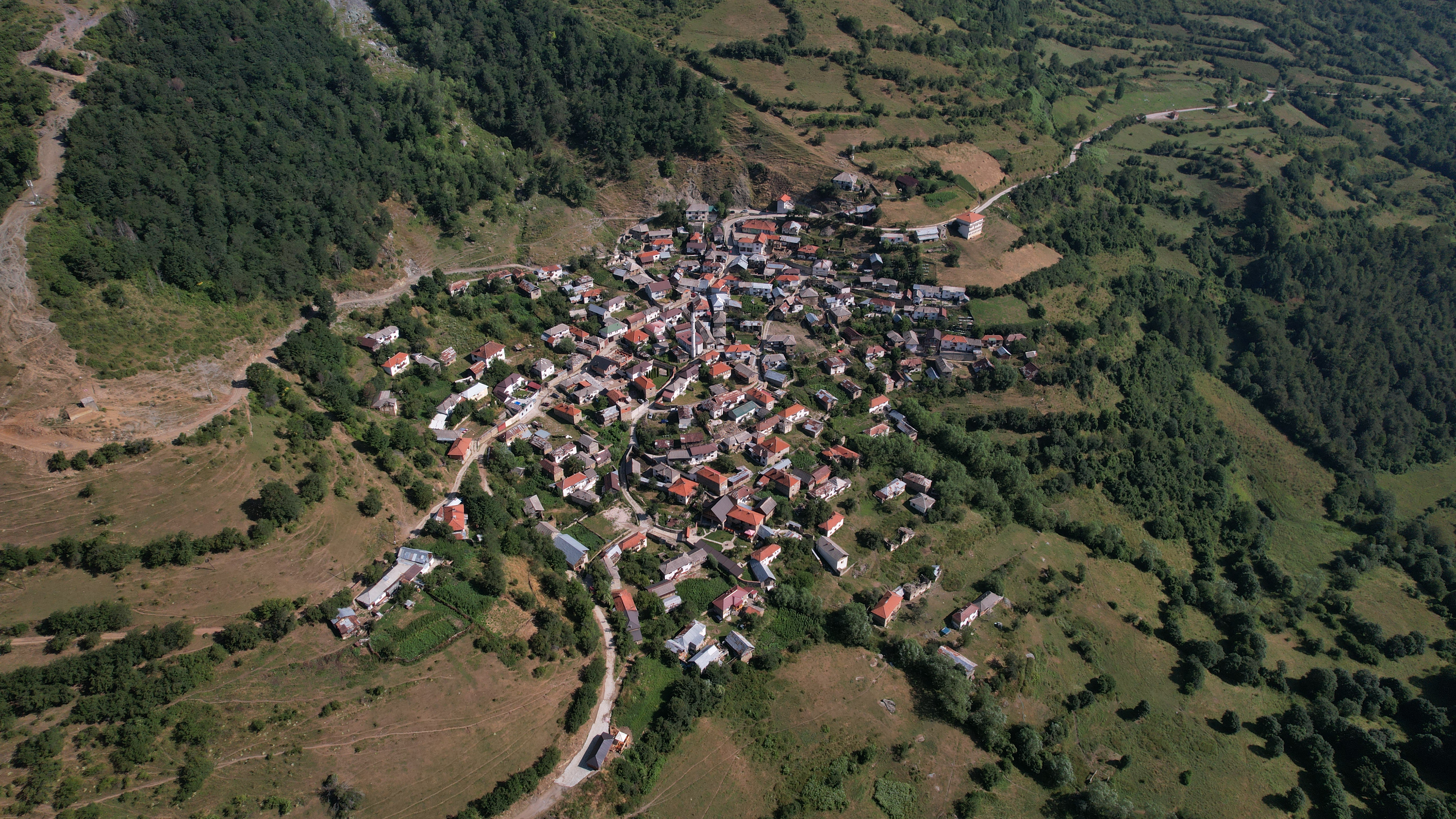
- Air view of the village

- Location within North Macedonia
- Coordinates: 42°03′N 20°50′E
- Country: North Macedonia
- Region: Polog
- Municipality: Tetovo

Population (2021)
  - Total: 174
- Time zone: UTC+1 (CET)
  - Summer (DST): UTC+2 (CEST)
- Car plates: TE
- Website: .

Bozovce (Macedonian: Бозовце, Albanian: Bozoc) is a village in the municipality of Tetovo, North Macedonia.

== Demographics ==
According to the 2021 census, the village had a total of 174 inhabitants. Ethnic groups in the village include:

- Albanians 137
- Others 37

Year	Macedonian	Albanian	Turks	Romani	Vlachs	Serbs	Bosniaks	Others	Total
2002	1	921	...	...	...	...	...	2	924
2021	...	137	...	...	...	...	...	37	174

According to the 1942 Albanian census, Bozovce was inhabited by 649 Muslim Albanians.

In statistics gathered by Vasil Kanchov in 1900, the village of Bozovce was inhabited by 330 Muslim Albanians.

== Notable people ==
- Fadil Sylejmani Albanologist and university professor from Bozovce (1940–2013)
