= International Slavic University G. R. Derzhavin =

International Slavic University
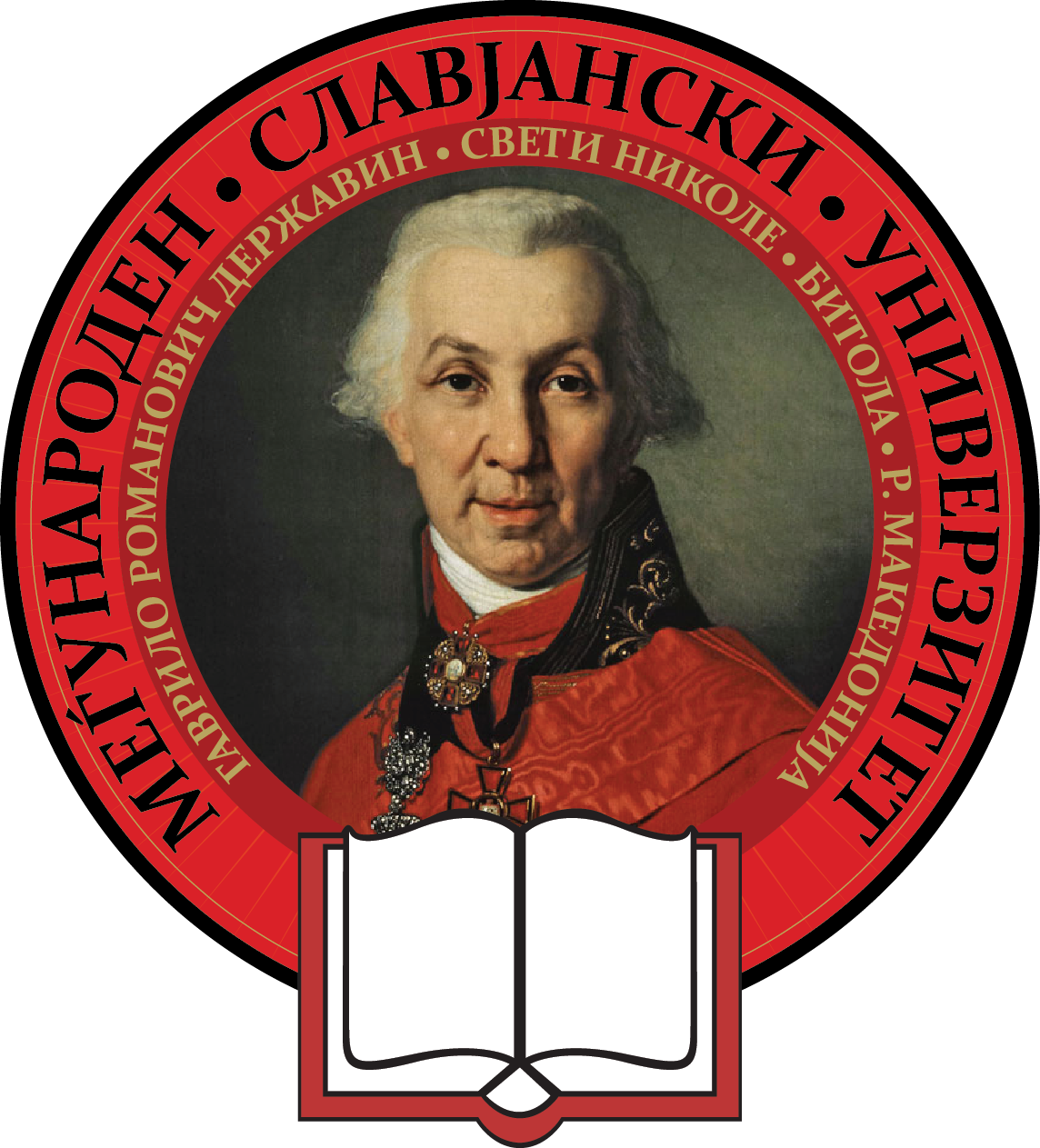
- Type: Private
- Established: 2004
- Rector: Lenče Petreska
- Academic staff: 100
- Students: 2,000
- Location: Sveti Nikole, North Macedonia
- Campus: Sveti Nikole, Bitola
- Website: www.msu.edu.mk

International Slavic University — private university located in Sveti Nikole, North Macedonia. The founder of this higher education institution is Prof. PhD. Jordan Gjorčev.

The university has two campuses in Sveti Nikole and Bitola and has become a home to more than 2000 students. The university is composed of five faculties and two institutes (Institute of Engineering Economics and Institute of Culture and Art). The university has a scholarship program for all faculties and has organized many events for the students.

The university is known for its two scientific conferences: International Scientific Dialogue: East-West and International Philosophical Dialogue: "East-West".

== History ==
International Slavic University began working in 2004 in Sveti Nikole. Starting in 2004, the Faculty of Economics and Organization of Entrepreneurship with study programs in Management and Entrepreneurship and the Faculty of Finance and Banking began to work. Next year, in 2005 beside the Faculty of Economics and Organization of Entrepreneurship, started Faculty of Psychology with the study program General Psychology.

Taking into account the great interest for studying at the territory of the Republic of North Macedonia, the university extended its work by opening the campus in Bitola in 2006.

In 2008 in accordance with the changes of the Law on Higher Education and implementing of the European Credit Transfer System (ECTS) the study programs were adjusted according to the Bologna Declaration and the Faculty of Economics and Organization of Entrepreneurship и Faculty of Psychology were accredited by the Ministry of Education and Science of the Republic of North Macedonia. The same year the institution was rebranded into International Slavic University.
