= Eurovia DOOEL =

Macedonian construction company

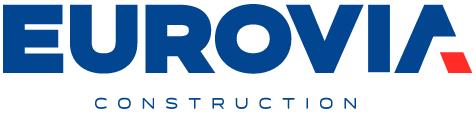

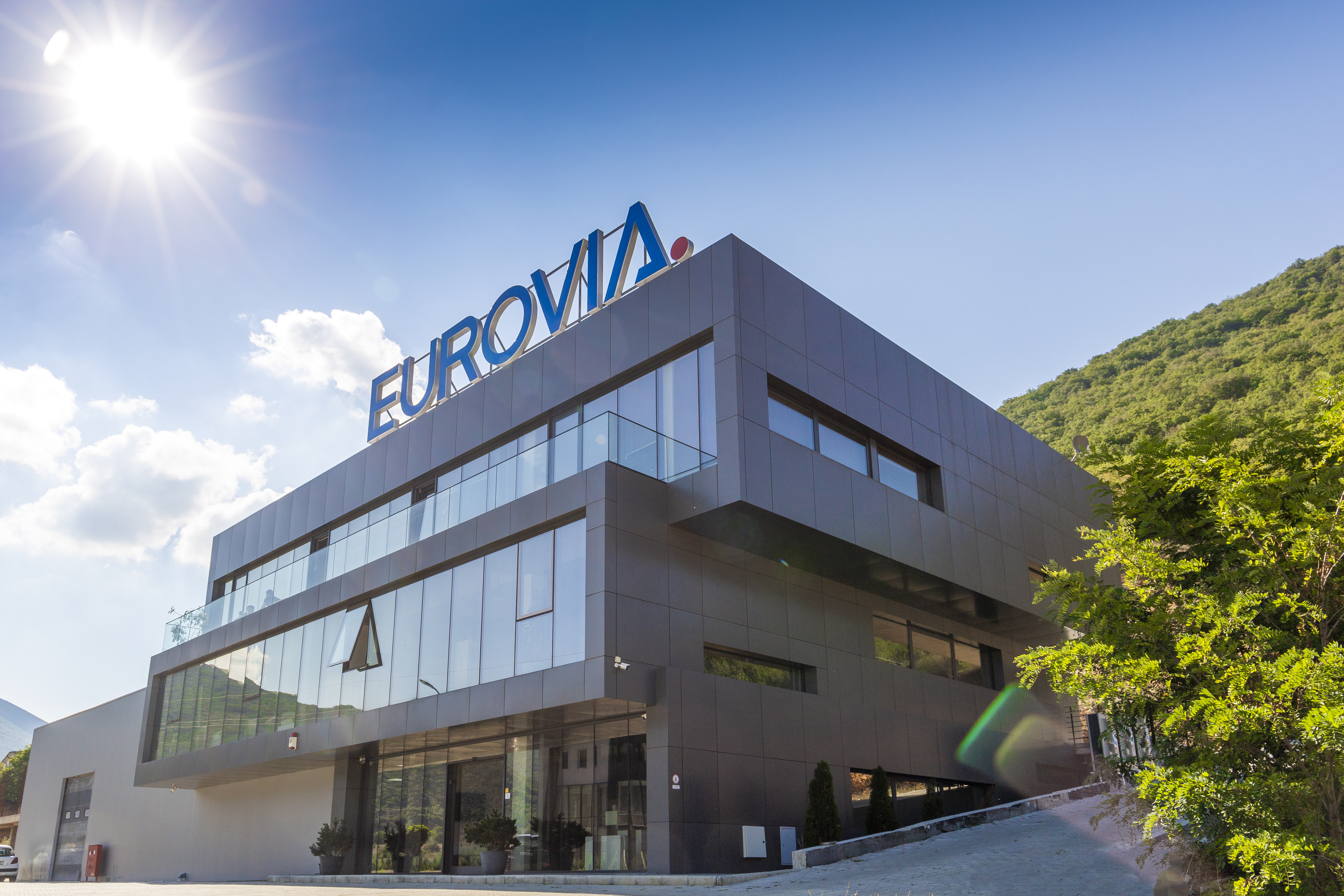
- Native name: Еуровиа ДООЕЛ
- Type: Private
- Industry: Construction; Energy; Road and Infrastructure; Agriculture
- Founded: 2010
- Number of employees: 200 (2022)
- Website: eurovia.mk

Eurovia DOOEL (Macedonian: Еуровиа ДООЕЛ) is a Macedonian construction and infrastructure development company based in Tetovo, North Macedonia. The company began in 2010, but its roots go back to a family business established in 1978.

== Overview ==
Eurovia DOOEL has its origins as a family-owned business established by Abdilazis Ademi and named "Muratori". The company initially concentrated on smaller construction projects, subsequently expanding its scope with the participation of other members of the Ademi family. The business was renamed to Eurovia DOOEL, in 2010.

With completed projects in North Macedonia, Kosovo and Albania, Eurovia DOOEL provides various range of projects, including high-rise buildings for both private and public investment, low-rise construction, road infrastructure development, solar panel installation, and hydro-power plant construction.

Eurovia comprises several subsidiary entities, each specializing in a distinct field:

- Eurovia DMD: a distribution company
- Eurovia Agrar: focused on the agricultural sector
- Energovia: dedicated to electricity production through hydropower plants
- Eurovia Solar: specializing in the generation of electricity via solar panels

In 2023, the company won the tender for the re-adaptation of the Boris Trajkovski Sports Center for the conference of the OSCE Ministerial Council.
