= Tutunski kombinat Prilep =

Tutunski kombinat Prilep Тутунски комбинат Прилеп
- Type: Public
- Industry: Tobacco
- Founded: 1873
- Headquarters: Prilep, North Macedonia
- Key people: Kire Stankoski, General Manager; Branko Hroneski, Manager
- Products: Tobacco
- Owner: Philip Morris International (51%); Government of North Macedonia (42%); Other shareholders (7%)
- Number of employees: 1350 (2008)
- Website: www.tkprilep.com.mk

Tutunski kombinat Prilep (Macedonian: Тутунски Комбинат ад Прилеп) is a tobacco company headquartered in Prilep, North Macedonia. The company mainly deals with the purchasing and selling of high-quality oriental tobacco (types Prilep and Yaka); its operations also include the production of cigarettes. The Prilep region is known for its production of quality oriental tobacco. Tobacco tradition in Prilep goes back to 1873 when R.O.T (Regie Ottoman de Tabak) built the first warehouse for purchasing and processing tobacco. In 1930 the Croatian scientist Rudolf Gornik introduced the first varieties of famous oriental type Prilep and heralded the beginning of a golden tobacco era in Prilep. The then Government of Yugoslavia issued a special resolution in 1949 which established a state-owned Tobacco company in Prilep. The primary aims of this trading company were the purchasing and processing of tobacco. Soon Prilep's "gold" brought the first money in ex-Yugoslavia from abroad. Trade was established with United States, Japan, and companies in Europe. In 1955 the Tobacco company from Prilep opened its first cigarette factory.

== History ==
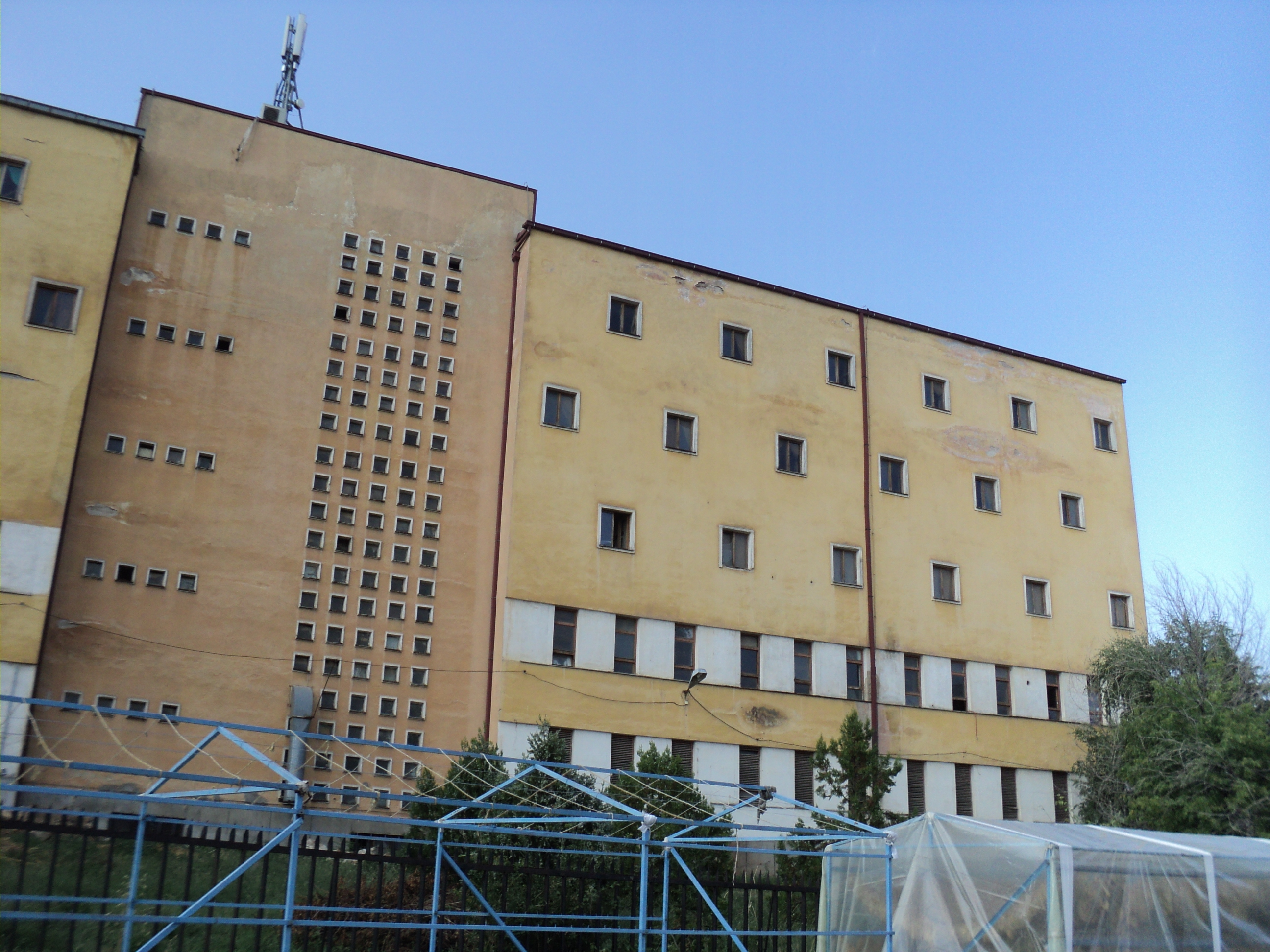
Main building of the TKP in Prilep

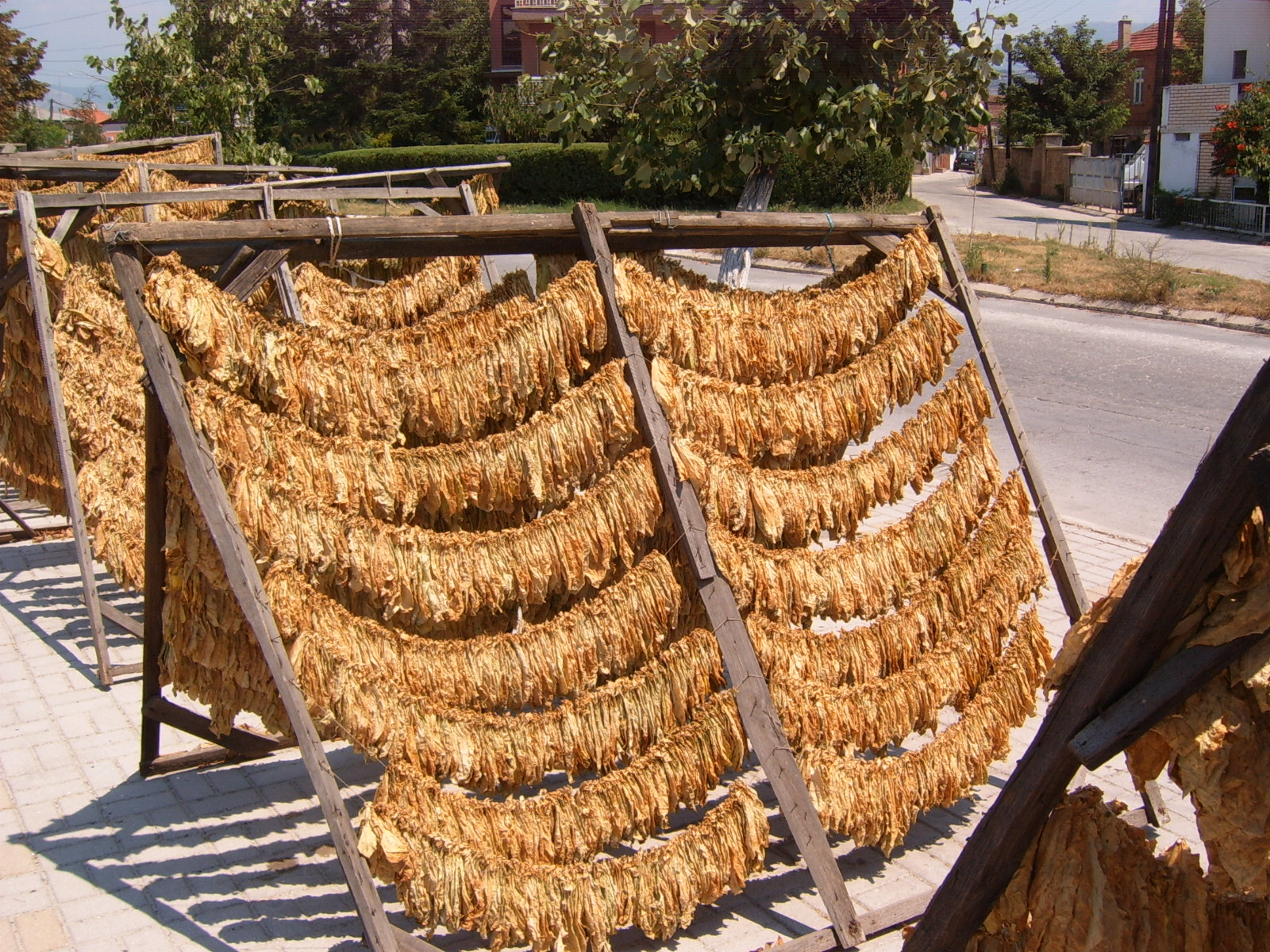
Drying of tobacco on the streets of Prilep, North Macedonia

1969 – New cigarette factory was opened and relocated. 1970–1977 – Cooperation with BAT and production of their licensed brands HB, Pall Mall, Lord and Kim. 1971 – Growing of Macedonian flue cured tobacco-type Virginia was introduced. 1975 – Start of the new factory for production of acetate filter rods. 1997–2006 – Cooperation with Philip Morris and production of their brands: Bond and Partner. 2003–2007 – Cooperation with Austria Tabak and production of their licensed brands: Ronson, Memphis classic, light and LD.

Current Brands which are produced in TKP: Brand Regular Box, Brand Lights Box, Brand 100s, Brand Regular Soft, Brand Super Light, Europa Box, Europa Soft, Filter Oriental (in ex Yugoslavia known as Jugoslavija), Macedonia, Prilep, Rondo Lights 100s, Rondo Lights Soft, Rondo Lights Box, Rondo Regular Box, San Slims, VIP Lights Box, VIP Regular Box. Previous brands which were produced in TKP are: filter Yugoslavia, Melos, Karat, Rodeo, Samuil.

Process of privatization was finished in 1993. Today 51% is owned by shareholders and 42% owned by the state, 7% others.
