= Lukoil Macedonia =

- Native name: Лукоил Македонија
- Industry: Oil & Gas
- Genre: Gas stations
- Founded: August 17, 2005; 21 years ago in Skopje, Macedonia
- Key people: Anderj M. Kuku
- Website: https://lukoil.com.mk/en

Lukoil Macedonia (Macedonian: Лукоил Македонија) is a subsidiary company of Lukoil in North Macedonia. The first gas station was open for service in 2006.

== Recognition ==
Lukoil has recognized its subsidiary in Macedonia for best one in 2012 and 2013.
