= Makedonijapat =

- Industry: State-owned limited company
- Founded: 1954 in Skopje, SR Macedonia
- Founder: Government of Socialist Republic of Macedonia
- Key people: Gajur Kadriu
- Owner: Government of North Macedonia
- Parent: Government of North Macedonia
- Website: makedonijapat.com.mk

Makedoniapat (Macedonian Cyrillic: Македонијапат) or Macedoniaroud is a Macedonian state-owned limited liability company tasked with management, construction and maintenance of motorways in North Macedonia. Duties and responsibilities of the company include: regular and winter maintenance of national and regional roads, designing smaller road facilities, paving smaller sections and patching potholes. Design, fabrication and installation of vertical and horizontal signalization, road protection, automatic and manual traffic counting, cadastre of roads and bridges, information service for the state of the roads, and more. Macedonian government announced in 2017 that the company has a debt of circa 7 million euros.
