= DON Market =

Former supermarket chain

DON
- Company type: supermarket chain
- Industry: Retail
- Founded: 2007
- Defunct: 2021
- Headquarters: Ohrid, North Macedonia
- Products: supermarkets grocery stores
- Parent: Damping Ohrid
- Website: www.don.com.mk

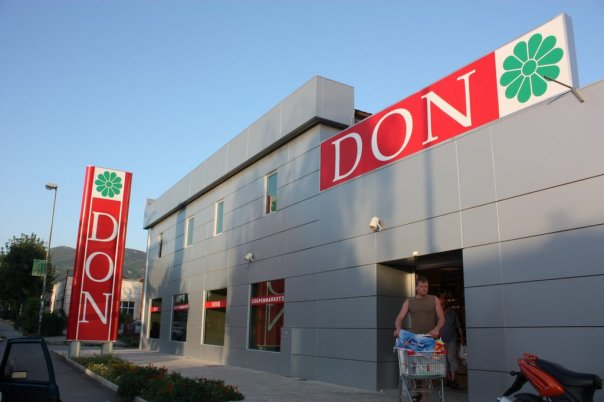
Don Market in Ohrid

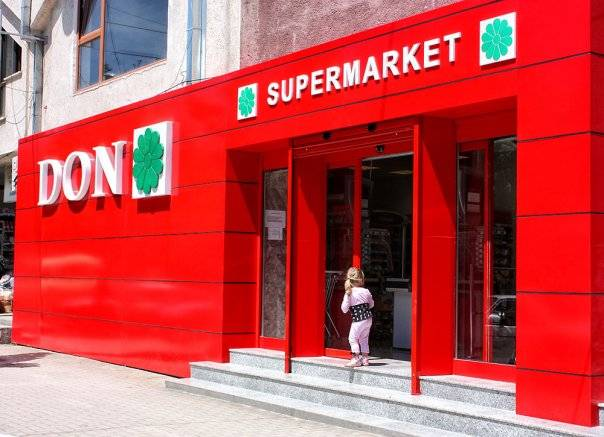
Don Market in Struga

DON Market was a chain of supermarkets in the Republic of North Macedonia. Don was founded in 2007, with its first store opening at Ohrid, Macedonia. Don had its first supermarket in Ohrid and Struga but planned to open in other cities in North Macedonia. Don was the most visited supermarket in Southwest North Macedonia. It also had a chain of small shops known as Damping or Mini DON. In April 2021, DON Market went out of business in Ohrid, Struga and Skopje.

== Locations ==
DON had established itself in 6 stores in:

- Ohrid
- Struga
- Skopje

== Slogans ==
- Supermarkets: "Biggest offer, smallest prices"
