= University American College Skopje =

Private college in Skopje, North Macedonia,

- Motto: Dedicated to your future.
- Type: Private
- Established: 2005; 21 years ago
- Rector: Marjan Bojadziev
- Faculty: 101
- Students: 10.000 (2024)
- Location: Skopje, North Macedonia
- Campus: 4,000 m2
- Nickname: UACS
- Website: www.uacs.edu.mk

The University American College Skopje (abbr. UACS) is a private university established in 2005. It is headquartered in Skopje, North Macedonia. The premises of UACS encompass 4,000 m2.

== Schools ==
- School of Business Administration
- School of Political Science
- School of Law
- School of Computer Science and Information Technology
- School of Architecture and Design
- School of Foreign Languages

== Library resources ==
The library of UACS has 1500 titles or 6500 books.

Since 2008, the Library of UACS started with publishing. The first book which was issued is Osnovi na Statistika by Evica Delova, and after that UACS library has continued with publishing of other books: Makroekonomija by Tome Nenovski, Decentralizacija na vlasta vo Republika Makedonija by Sapuric Zoran, Kon Univerzitetite od Tretata Generacija by Hans Vizema, Zivotna sredina I oddrzliv razvoj by Zoran Sapuric, and others. Besides these books, the library has published a number of readers and scripts (23) and eight books in electronic form, according to the rules laid down by the home library (NUL) in North Macedonia, which also contained in the Rules of Publishing UACS.

== Student council ==
The Student Council helps share students’ ideas, interests, and concerns with the teachers and principal. It also helps students raise funds for school wide projects.
