= South East European University =

University in North Macedonia

- Universiteti i Evropës Juglindore; Универзитет на Југоисточна Европа
- University's logo
- Type: Private-public nonprofit university
- Established: 2001; 25 years ago
- Rector: Sadudin Ibraimi
- Students: 1,849 (2018–19)
- Location: Tetovo, North Macedonia; 41°59′09″N 20°57′40″E
- Campus: Tetovo and Skopje
- Website: www.seeu.edu.mk

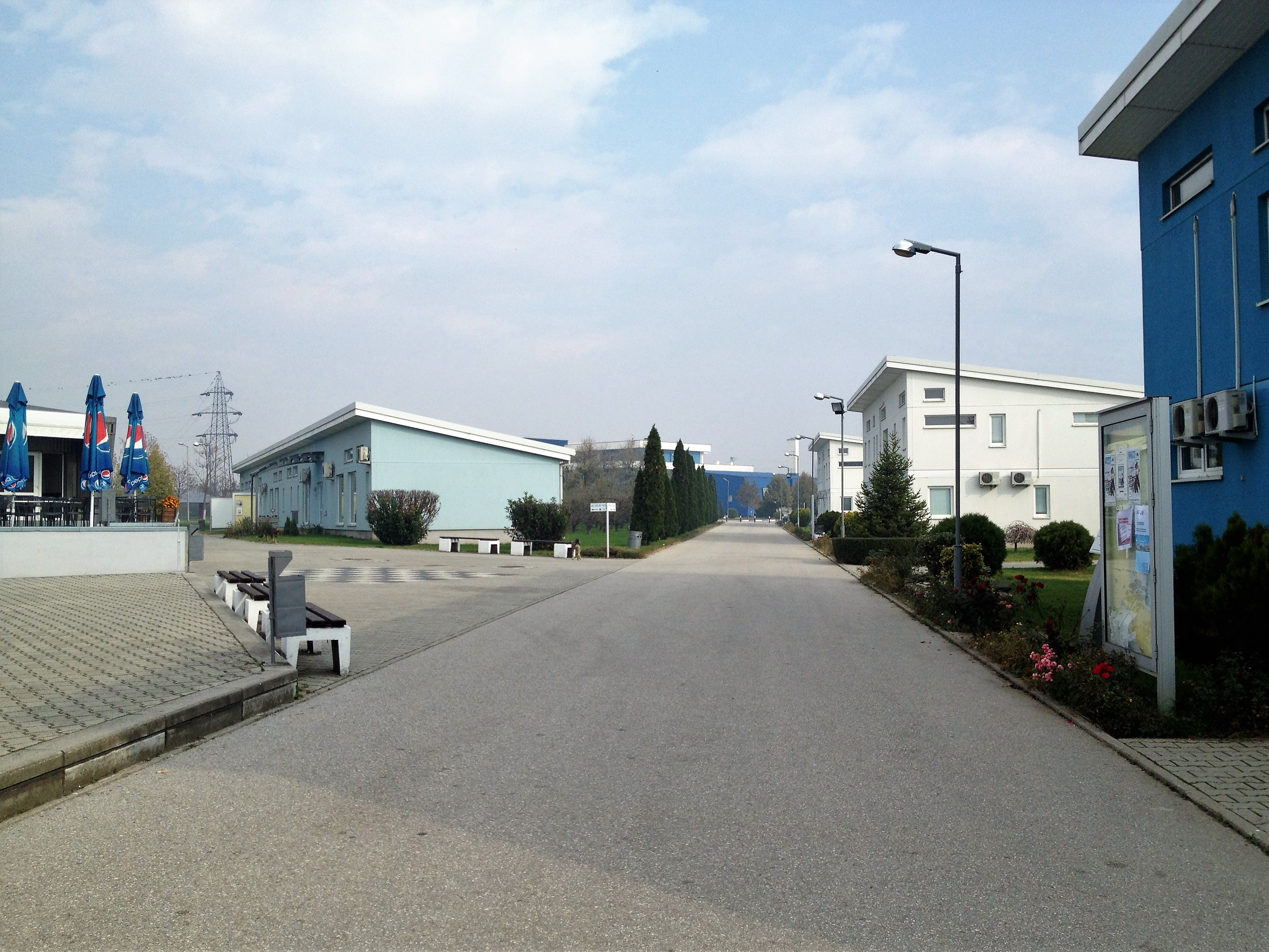
Tetovo campus of South East European University

Skopje campus of South East European University

South East European University (SEEU), informally also known as the Max van der Stoel University, is a private-public nonprofit higher education institution. It was established on the initiative of OSCE's High Commissioner on National Minorities Max van der Stoel and is located in Tetovo, North Macedonia, with a branch campus in Skopje.

The university is an associate member of the European University Association and the Balkan Universities Network, and a member of the International Association of Universities.

== Background and foundation ==
The then Republic of Macedonia ratified the Council of Europe Framework Convention on National Minorities in 1998, declaring that Albanian speakers constituted a national minority. The Convention provided that national minorities could establish private educational institutions with no financial obligation on the state. The Council of Europe gave a critical opinion on drafts of the country’s higher education law which did not provide for university education in the Albanian language. Fro, the early 1990s, Dutch diplomat Max van der Stoel, who was then OSCE's High Commissioner on National Minorities, became involved in efforts to resolve the issue of Albanian-language study at the university level, between Macedonian and Albanian political leaders. Albanians protested against the failure of the Macedonian state to provide Albanian-language study in universities. Two public universities, Ss. Cyril and Methodius University of Skopje and St. Clement of Ohrid University of Bitola, only offered courses in the Macedonian language. In 1994, an illegal Albanian-language university was established in Tetovo, which led to increased tension between Macedonians and Albanians. With Van der Stoel's efforts, a compromise solution was reached between Macedonian and Albanian political leaders. On 25 July 2000, under recommendations of OSCE, and supported by the Council of Europe, the Macedonian parliament adopted a Law on Higher Education, which permitted the establishment of private universities in the languages of the minorities. It resulted in the establishment of the university in Tetovo in 2001. Following the Ohrid Framework Agreement of 2001, a new state university was established in 2004 taking in the former illegal university. Later, SEEU started to receive public funding for specific purposes, amounting to about 10% of its income, otherwise derived from student tuition fees and research projects.

== Faculties and study programmes ==
South East European University (SEEU) offers degrees at the bachelor, master and doctorate levels in several areas of study.

Study programmes are offered in three languages: English, Albanian and Macedonian.

The university is constituted of seven faculties:

- Law
- Contemporary Social Sciences
- Business and Economics
- Languages, Cultures and Communications
- Contemporary Sciences and Technologies
- Health Sciences
- Technical Sciences

== Admissions ==
South East European University (SEEU) has a selective admission policy based on students' previous academic record and grades.
