= University of Information Science and Technology "St. Paul The Apostle" =

State university, located in Ohrid, North Macedonia

Coordinates: 41.1133°N 20.8025°E

- Универзитет за информатички науки и технологии "Св. Апостол Павле"
- Type: Public
- Established: 2009; 17 years ago
- Affiliations: EUA
- Rector: Atanas Hristov, PhD
- Location: Ohrid, North Macedonia
- Campus: Urban
- Website: www.uist.edu.mk

The University of Information Science and Technology "St. Paul The Apostle" (Macedonian: Универзитет за информатички науки и технологии "Св. Апостол Павле", romanized: Univerzitet za informatički nauki i tehnologii "Sv. Apostol Pavle"; abbr. UIST) is a public university in North Macedonia.

UIST was founded by the Parliament of the Republic of Macedonia by the Act on Establishment of the University for Information Technology in 2008.

== Campus and location ==
The main campus of the University of Information Science and Technology “St. Paul the Apostle” is situated in an urban setting in Ohrid, North Macedonia. It includes academic buildings, classrooms, laboratories, and facilities for student activities.

== Academics ==
The University of Information Science and Technology “St. Paul the Apostle” offers undergraduate, postgraduate, and doctoral education in the field of information sciences and related technological disciplines.

At the undergraduate level, the university provides Bachelor’s degree programmes focused on computer science, communication networks, information systems, multimedia technologies, machine intelligence, robotics, and information and communication sciences. These programmes combine theoretical foundations with practical laboratory work and project-based learning in areas related to digital technologies and applied computing. The university also offers Master of Science (MSc) programmes designed to provide advanced specialization in information and communication technologies. Master’s studies emphasize analytical skills, research methodology, and applied technological development. Students engage in advanced coursework and complete a supervised master’s thesis as part of their academic training. Doctoral studies at UIST are research-oriented and lead to the award of the Doctor of Science (PhD) degree in information science and related technological fields. The doctoral programmes require independent scientific research under academic supervision, participation in scholarly activities, and the preparation and public defense of a doctoral dissertation. These programmes are conducted in accordance with the national higher education framework and accreditation standards of North Macedonia.

== Research and Projects ==
The University of Information Science and Technology “St. Paul the Apostle” participates in international research initiatives in the fields of artificial intelligence, digital transformation, and information technologies. Among its notable activities is involvement in the Horizon 2020 project .

The university also contributes to research within the framework of COST (European Cooperation in Science and Technology, including COST Action CA20120, focused on smart specialization, industrial innovation, and digital transformation.
