= Makpetrol =

Macedonian oil distributor

Makpetrol AD Макепотрол АД
- Native name: Макпетрол АД
- Type: Joint Stock Company
- Traded as: MSE: MPT
- ISIN: MKMPTS101014
- Industry: Petroleum
- Founded: 1947; 79 years ago
- Headquarters: Skopje, North Macedonia
- Key people: Andrea Josifoski
- Products: Oil, Gas, Petroleum products
- Website: www.makpetrol.com.mk

Makpetrol (Macedonian: Макпетрол) is the leading distributor of largest oil companies and oil products in North Macedonia. The company was founded in 1947 as Jugopetrol-Skopje, (Macedonian: Југопетрол-Скопје) employing 85 individuals. Today, Makpetrol is one of the biggest companies in North Macedonia and celebrated its sixtieth anniversary in 2007. Revenue of Makpetrol was 402 million euros in 2013. The company has 117 gas stations and its headquarters is in Skopje, the capital of North Macedonia.

== See also ==
- Economy of North Macedonia
- Energy in North Macedonia
