= Mother Teresa University in Skopje =

Public university in Skopje, North Macedonia

Coordinates: 42.0137°N 21.4293°E

Mother Teresa University in Skopje (Albanian: Universiteti Nënë Tereza në Shkup) is a public university based in Skopje, North Macedonia. Studies in this institution are conducted in Albanian and Macedonian. The university was founded in 2016 with the mission of creating academic opportunities for students to develop as individuals and professionals. It offers education in both natural and social sciences through its five faculties. These faculties cover a variety of disciplines, including computer science, applied programming, etc. Despite its young age, the university has grown to over 3,500 students and offers a variety of undergraduate and graduate programs.

The university is named after Saint Mother Teresa, who was born Agnes Gonxhe Bojaxhiu in Skopje. Mother Teresa was a Catholic nun who dedicated her life to helping the poor and sick. She founded the Missionaries of Charity, a religious congregation that provides care for the poor, sick, orphaned, and dying around the world. Mother Teresa was awarded the Nobel Peace Prize in 1979 for her work.

== Faculties ==
- Faculty of Informatics
- Faculty of Social Sciences
- Faculty of Technical Sciences
- Faculty of Technological Sciences
- Faculty of Civil Engineering and Architecture
