= List of banks in North Macedonia =

The following is a list of banks in North Macedonia, correct as of 25 December 2025.

== Central bank ==
- National Bank of the Republic of North Macedonia

== Commercial and retail banks ==
Full name	Call name	SWIFT code	Majority owner	Capital	Website
Silk Road Bank AD Skopje	Silk Road Bank	KRSKMK2X	Silk Road Capital AG	(Switzerland)	silkroadbank.com.mk
Halkbank AD Skopje	Halkbank	EXPCMK22	Türkiye Halk Bankası A.Ş	(Turkey)	halkbank.mk
Sparkasse Banka AD Skopje	Sparkasse Bank	INSBMK22	Erste Group Bank AG	(Austria)	sparkasse.mk
M Bank AD Skopje	M Bank	INPBMK21	Alfa Finance Holding AD	(Bulgaria)	mbank.mk
Komercijalna Banka AD Skopje	Komercijalna banka	KOBSMK2X	Public	(North Macedonia)	kb.com.mk
Development Bank of North Macedonia AD Skopje	MBDP	MBDPMK22	State-owned	(North Macedonia)	mbdp.com.mk
NLB Banka AD Skopje	NLB Banka	TUTNMK22	NLB Group	(Slovenia)	nlb.mk
ProCredit Bank AD Skopje	ProCredit Bank	PRBUMK22	ProCredit Group	(Germany)	pcb.mk
Centralna kooperativna banka AD Skopje	CCB	CECBMK22	Central Cooperative Bank Plc.	(Bulgaria)	ccbank.mk
Alta Banka AD Bitola	STBBT	STBBMK22	Alta Bank a.d. Beograd	(Serbia)	altabanka.com.mk
Stopanska Banka AD Skopje	Stopanska Banka	STOBMK2X	National Bank of Greece S.A.	(Greece)	stb.mk
Universal Investment Bank AD Skopje	UNI Bank	UIBMMK22	First Investment Bank Plc.	(Bulgaria)	unibank.mk
TTK Banka AD Skopje	TTK	TTXBMK2X		(North Macedonia)	ttk.com.mk

== Representative offices of foreign banks ==
- Bank Austria Creditanstalt AG Representative Office - Skopje

== Saving houses ==
- AL KOSA – Stip
- AM - Skopje
- Bavag d.o.o.- Skopje
- Fersped d.o.o. - Skopje
- FULM stedilnica d.o.o.-Skopje
- Gragjanska stedilnica - Skopje
- Inko d.o.o. - Skopje
- Interfalko - Skopje
- Peon - Strumica
- Mak- BS - Skopje
- Mladinec d.o.o. - Skopje
- Moznosti - Skopje

== See also ==
- List of banks in Europe
- List of banks in Yugoslavia
