= Economy of North Macedonia =

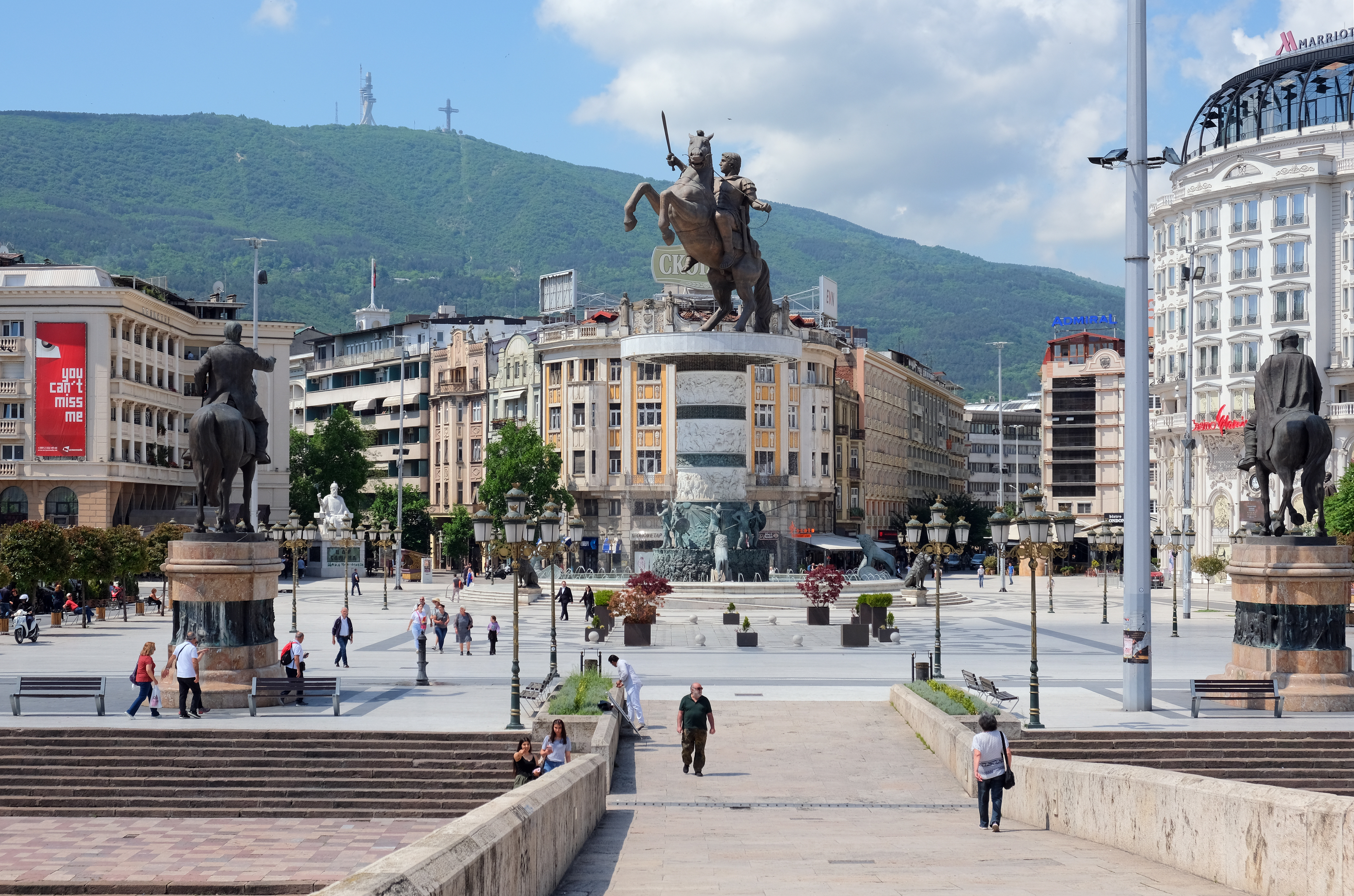
- Skopje, the financial centre of North Macedonia
- Currency: Macedonian denar (den, MKD)
- Fiscal year: calendar уеаr
- Trade organisations: WTO, CEFTA, Open Balkan
- Country group: Developing/Emerging; Upper-middle income economy

Statistics
- Population: ▼1,821,016 (2025 vital statistics)
- GDP: ▲$20.75 billion (nominal; 2026); ▲$56.11 billion (PPP; 2026)
- GDP rank: 134th (nominal; 2025); 132nd (PPP; 2025)
- GDP growth: ▲3.4% (2025); ▲3.2% (2026); ▲3.2% (2027f); ▲3.1% (2028f)
- GDP per capita: ▲$11,530 (nominal; 2026); ▲$31,170 (PPP; 2026)
- GDP per capita rank: 81st (nominal; 2025); 71st (PPP; 2025)
- GDP by sector: agriculture: 6%; industry: 22.7%; services: 59.2%; (2024)
- Inflation (CPI): 3.9% (2025)
- Population below national poverty line: ▼21.8% (2020); ▼41.1% at risk of poverty or social exclusion (2018); 16.9% on less than $5.50/day (2020f)
- Gini coefficient: ▼29.2 low (2024)
- Human Development Index: ▲0.815 very high (2023) (68th); ▲0.723 high IHDI (2023) (56th)
- Corruption Perceptions Index: 40 out of 100 points (2025, 84th rank)
- Labour force: ▲797 884 (2026); 46.5 % employment rate (2026)
- Labour force by occupation: agriculture: 16.6%; industry: 29.6%; services: 53.8%; (2016)
- Unemployment: ▼11.3% (2026)
- Youth unemployment: ▲28.8% (2025)
- Average gross salary: MKD 69,141 / €1,122.02 / $1,311.86 monthly (Nov, 2025)
- Average net salary: MKD 45,961 / €745.86 / $872.05 monthly (Nov, 2025)
- Main industries: food processing, beverages, textiles, chemicals, iron, steel, cement, energy, pharmaceuticals, automotive parts

External
- Exports: ▼$9.254 billion (2024)
- Export goods: foodstuffs, beverages, tobacco; textiles, miscellaneous manufactures, iron, steel; automotive parts
- Main export partners: EU 74.73%; Germany 36.3%; Bulgaria 5.43%; Czechia 4.49%; Greece 4.3%; Hungary 3.32%; Serbia 9.51%; Turkey 1.9%; South Africa 1.81%; Bosnia and Herzegovina 1.69%; United States 1.61% (2024)
- Imports: ▼$12.548 billion (2024)
- Import goods: machinery and equipment, automobiles, chemicals, fuels, food products
- Main import partners: EU 51.43%; Germany 10.3%; Greece 8.79%; Bulgaria 5.66%; Italy 4.01%; Poland 3.57%; United Kingdom 10.6%; China 9.22%; Serbia 7.98%; Turkey 6.54%; United States 1.55% (2024)
- FDI stock: ▲$6.937 billion (31 December 2017 est.); ▲ Abroad: $1.169 billion (31 December 2017 est.)
- Current account: ▲ −$151 million (2017 est.)
- Gross external debt: ▲$8.79 billion (31 December 2017 est.)

Public finance
- Government debt: ▼47.3% of GDP (2017)
- Foreign reserves: ▲$2.802 billion (31 December 2017 est.)
- Budget balance: −2.7% (of GDP) (2017 est.)
- Revenue: 3.295 billion (2017 est.)
- Spending: 3.605 billion (2017 est.)
- Credit rating: Standard & Poor's: BB-(Domestic); BB-(Foreign); BB(T&C Assessment); Outlook: Stable (2014); Fitch: BB+ Outlook: Stable (2011)
- All values, unless otherwise stated, are in US dollars.

North Macedonia has a developing transition economy. Since its 1991 independence movement, the Macedonian economy liberalized, with highly accommodative foreign policy. Its economic growth was severely curbed during the 1990s after the United Nations heavily sanctioned Yugoslavia and Greece independently sanctioned North Macedonia. The economy stabilized through remittances and foreign aid, with positive growth until 2001. Successful privatization boosted regional integration during the 2000s. North Macedonia is self-sufficient in meeting basic food needs but is dependent on imports for nearly all energy and modern infrastructure.

== History ==
North Macedonia's economy has almost always been completely agricultural in nature from the beginning of the Ottoman Empire when it was part of the Sanjak of Üsküp and Salonica vilayet. It concentrated on pasture farming and vineyard growing. Opium poppy, introduced into the region in 1835, became an important crop as well by the late 19th century, and remained so until the 1930s.

The role of industry in the region's economy increased during the industrial age. The geographical region of Macedonia was responsible for large outputs of textiles and several other goods in the Ottoman Empire. However, outdated techniques to produce the goods persisted. The stagnation of the regional economy began under the rule of the Kingdom of Serbia.

When World War II ended, the local economy began to experience revitalization by way of subsidies from Federal Belgrade. The subsidies assisted North Macedonia to redevelop its "lost" industry and shift its agricultural-centered economy to an industry-centered economy with new hearts of industry emerging all over the country in Veles, Bitola, Štip and Kumanovo. Previously, Skopje was the only industrial centre in North Macedonia, this expanded to several other cities during Socialist Yugoslavia.

After the fall of Socialist Yugoslavia, the economy experienced several shocks that damaged the local economy. Starting with the Western embargo on the Yugoslavian common market, and ending with the Greek embargo on Macedonia over the Macedonia naming dispute. The economy began to recover in 1995 and experienced a full recovery after the 2001 insurgency by ethnic Albanians. Macedonia's GDP grew by an average of 6% annually until the 2008 financial crisis, when its economy contracted. The crisis had little impact on the country. North Macedonia today maintains a low debt-to-GDP ratio and is experiencing a revitalized investment interest by companies from Turkey, Algeria, Albania, and others.

North Macedonia is vulnerable to economic developments in Europe – due to strong banking and trade ties – and dependent on regional integration and progress toward EU membership for continued economic growth. At independence in September 1991, North Macedonia was the least developed of the Yugoslav republics, producing a mere 5% of the total federal output of goods and services. The collapse of the Socialist Federal Republic of Yugoslavia ended transfer payments from the central government and eliminated advantages from inclusion in a de facto free trade area. An absence of infrastructure, UN sanctions on the downsized Yugoslavia, and a Greek economic embargo over a dispute about the country's constitutional name and flag hindered economic growth until 1996. Since then, North Macedonia has maintained macroeconomic stability with low inflation, but it has so far lagged the region in attracting foreign investment and creating jobs, despite making extensive fiscal and business sector reforms. Official unemployment remains high at 24.6% (2015, Q4), but may be overstated based on the existence of an extensive gray market that is not captured by official statistics. In the wake of the global economic downturn, North Macedonia has experienced decreased foreign direct investment, lowered credit availability, and a large trade deficit. However, as a result of conservative fiscal policies and a sound financial system, in 2010 the country credit rating improved slightly to BB+ and was kept at that level in 2011. Macroeconomic stability has been maintained by a prudent monetary policy, which keeps the domestic currency pegged against the euro. As a result, GDP growth was modest, but positive, in 2010 and 2011, and inflation was under control. Latest data from North Macedonia's State Statistical Office show that overall, output for 2012 dropped by 6.6 percent compared to 2011.

== Macroeconomics ==
Real GDP in the first half of 2011 increased by 5.2%. This robust growth was mainly driven by 23.6% growth in the construction sector; 13.2% in mining, quarrying, and manufacturing; 12.4% in wholesale and retail trade; and 4.2% in transport and communication services. Industrial output in the first 8 months of 2011 was 7.5% higher than in the same period of 2010. Low public and external debt and a comfortable level of foreign exchange reserves allowed for further relaxation of monetary policy, with the reference interest rate of the Central Bank decreasing to 4%. Due to rising prices for energy, fuel, and food on international markets, inflation increased in the first half of 2011, but later decreased to an annualized rate of 3.4% at the end of September. The official unemployment rate dropped to 24.6% in the fourth quarter of 2015, but remained one of the highest in Europe. Many people work in the gray economy, and many experts estimate North Macedonia's actual unemployment is lower.

The government budget has generally kept within projections. The budget deficit at the end of August 2011 reached about 2% of GDP, and fiscal authorities seemed committed to keeping it under the projected target of 2.5% of GDP by the end of the year. In addition to 220 million euros (approx. $298 million) drawn from an IMF Precautionary Credit Line (PCL) in March, financing mostly came from domestic borrowing. However, by the end of the year a financing gap remained of about 50 million to 60 million euros (approx. $67 million to $81 million), which the government plans to cover by borrowing from international capital markets, supported by a policy-based guarantee by the World Bank. The central government's public debt remained low at 26% of GDP, but represents a gradual increase from previous years. Despite lowering the Central Bank bills rate, the Central Bank has not changed liquidity indicators for banks or the reserve requirement since 2009, curbing credit growth to 7.5% in the first three-quarters of 2011. Nikola Gruevski says the government will pay off its entire debt to the private sector by February 2013 in order to improve the economy's overall liquidity. North Macedonia's external trade struggled in 2010 due to the slow recovery from the economic crisis of its main trading partners, particularly EU members. Starting from a very low base, export growth in the first 8 months of 2011 reached 41.7%, topping import growth of 36.8%. The trade deficit has widened to 18.3% of GDP, approaching the end-year target of 21.9% of GDP. At the same time, the current account balance deficit significantly improved and the end-year projection was revised upward to 5.5% of GDP. This was due primarily to a 4.4% higher inflow of current transfers, mostly during the summer, and came despite a poor level of foreign direct investment (FDI) of only $237.2 million by end-July 2011. Foreign currency reserves remained at about $2.6 billion, a level that comfortably covers 4 months of imports and about 110% of the country's short-term debt.

In October 2010, the World Bank Board of Directors approved a new Country Partnership Strategy (CPS) with North Macedonia for the period 2011–2014. This CPS will provide the country assistance of about $100 million in funding for the first 2 years to improve competitiveness, strengthen employability and social protection, and increase the use of sustainable energy. This assistance also includes a commitment of $30 million in direct budget support in the form of a policy-based guarantee by the World Bank to the government to facilitate its access to financing from international capital markets, a process that had been started as of November 2011.

North Macedonia became the first country eligible for the IMF's Precautionary Credit Line in January 2011. This program gives North Macedonia a line of credit worth 475 million euros (about $675 million) over 2 years, intended to be accessed only in case of need brought about by external shocks. The credit line was approved after extensive consultations with the IMF in October and December 2010. The IMF expects that there will be no additional withdrawals from the PCL.

North Macedonia has the best economic freedom in the region, according to the 2012 Index of Economic Freedom, released in January, 2012 by the conservative U.S. think tank Heritage Foundation and the Wall Street Journal.

=== Unemployment ===
Unemployed	1995	2000	2005	2010	2015	2020	2025
Persons	N/A	N/A	N/A	311,000	265,000	156,627	91,765
Percent (%)	30%	33%	38%	32%	27%	16.2%	11.5%

Unemployment is a continuing problem in the Republic's economy where a large percentage of the Republic's qualified labor force cannot find work. Many people lost their jobs with the collapse of Yugoslavia. As a result, national unemployment was above 35% (37.30% in 2005), but that number has since dropped to 11.7% (Q1, 2025), with population below the poverty line also dropping from 30.4% (2011) to 21.5% (2015), it is reasonable to assume that based on the trend over the past few years, further declines are likely for both unemployment and poverty. Full-time employment has risen steadily over the last few years, with part-time employment trending slightly downward over the same period resulting in an overall increase to employment, wages increased sharply after 2008, with steady increases continuing into 2016.

== Sectors ==
=== Agriculture ===
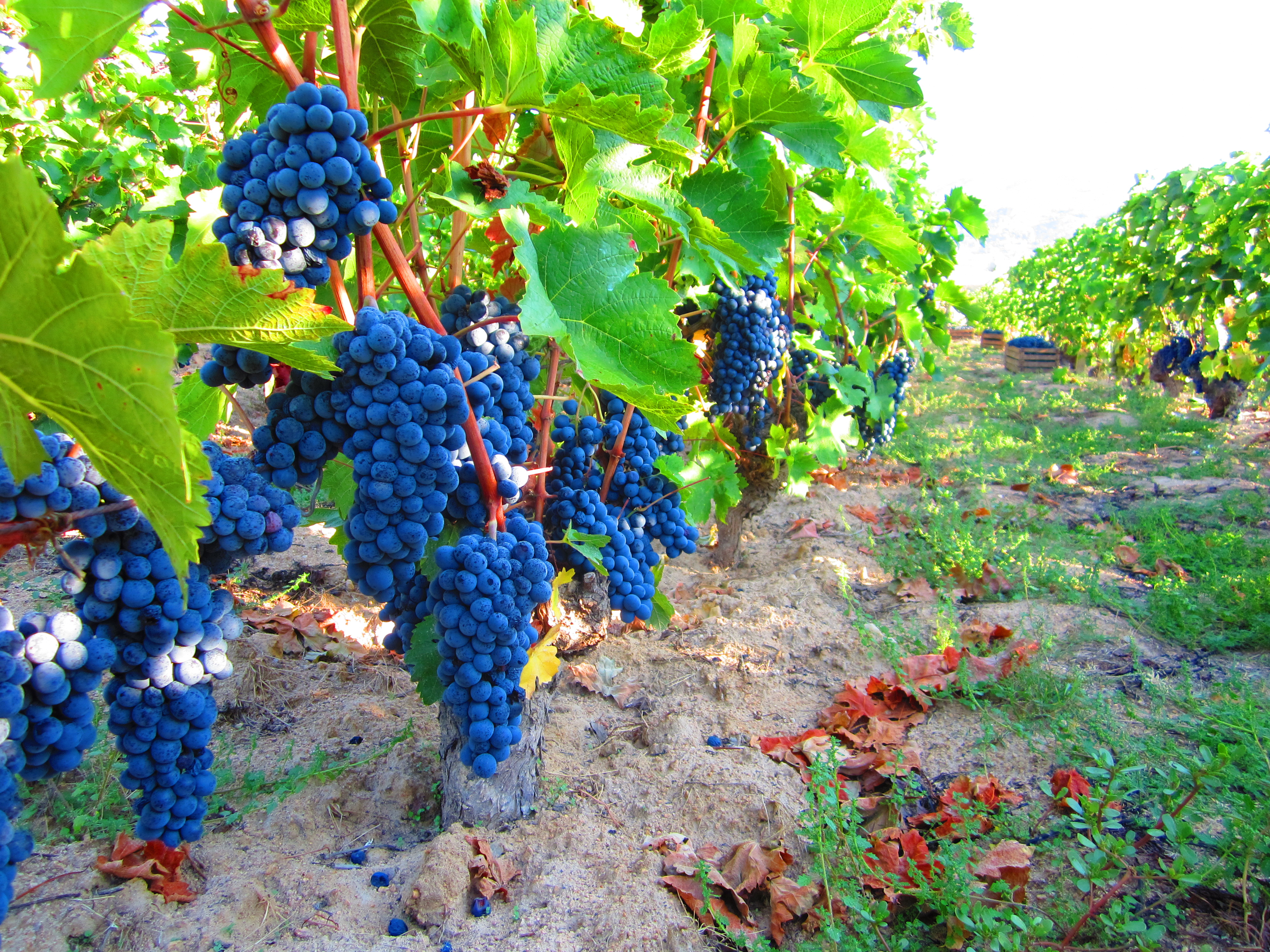
Vineyard in North Macedonia, 2013

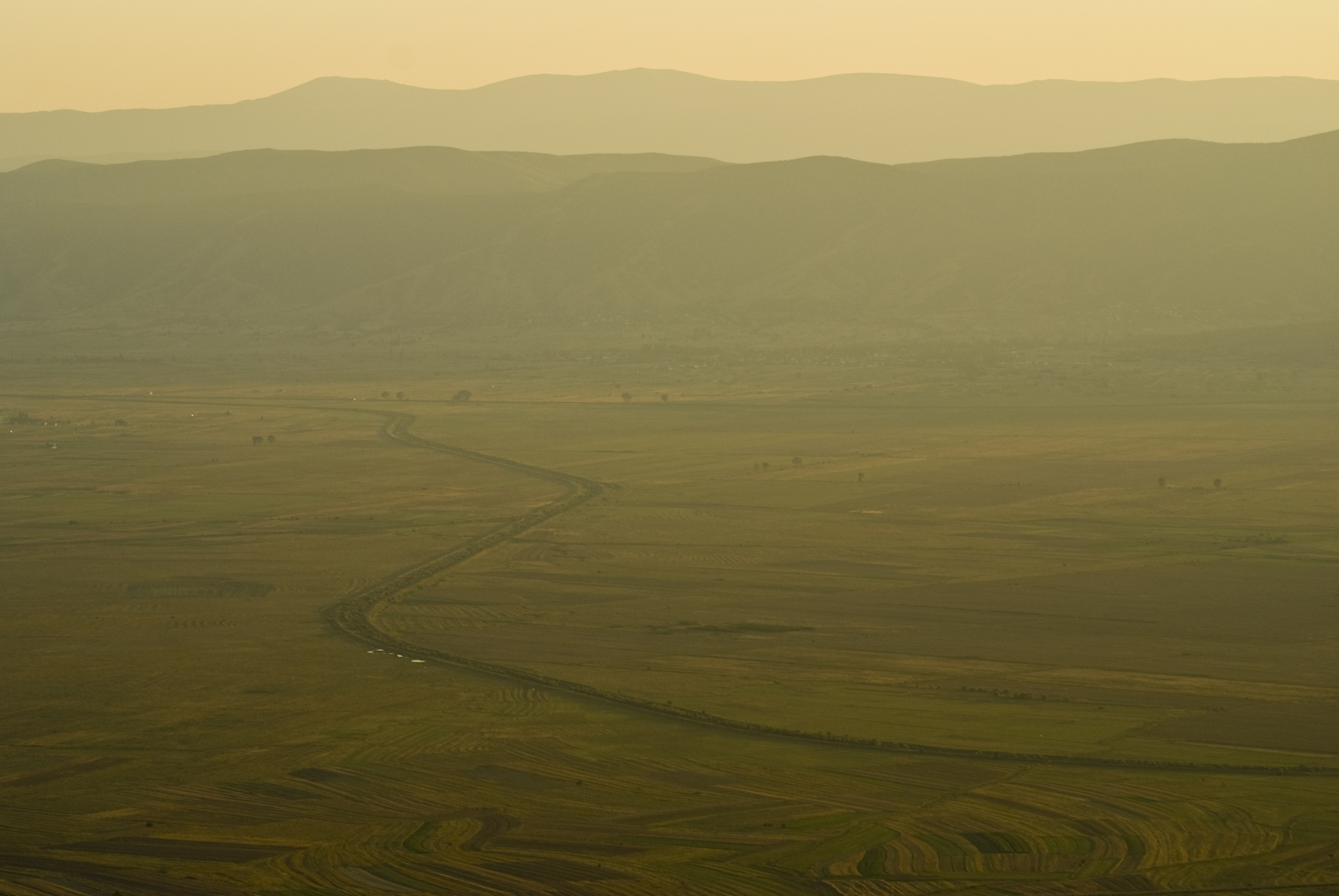
Pelagonija, breadbasket region of North Macedonia, 2009

Agriculture in North Macedonia provides a livelihood for a fifth of the country's population, where half live in a rural area. Industrialisation of the country was very delayed, due to the long Ottoman domination, and then destruction from World War I and Serbian occupation. Massive agrarian reforms began under Socialist Federative Yugoslavia with its own communist rule. The continental and sub-Mediterranean climates in the country allows for a great diversity of output, but the pronounced terrain creates areas that are unexploitable for farmers. Macedonian agriculture is dominated by livestock farming, especially in its mountainous regions, viticulture, and the growing of fruit and vegetables, cereals, and tobacco. Agriculture in the country is characterised by numerous small-scale family farms, but also by large businesses, left over from the socialist era. Since its independence in 1991, the country has become a market economy. Today, agriculture accounts for 10% of North Macedonia's GDP.

North Macedonia produced in 2020:

- 318,000 tons of grape;
- 246,000 tons of wheat;
- 205,000 tons of bell pepper;
- 193,000 tons of potato;
- 168,000 tons of cabbage;
- 155,000 tons of tomato;
- 150,000 tons of maize;
- 148,000 tons of barley;
- 125,000 tons of watermelon;
- 106,000 tons of apple;
- 63,000 tons of onion;
- 49,000 tons of cucumber;

In addition to smaller productions of other agricultural products.

=== Tourism ===
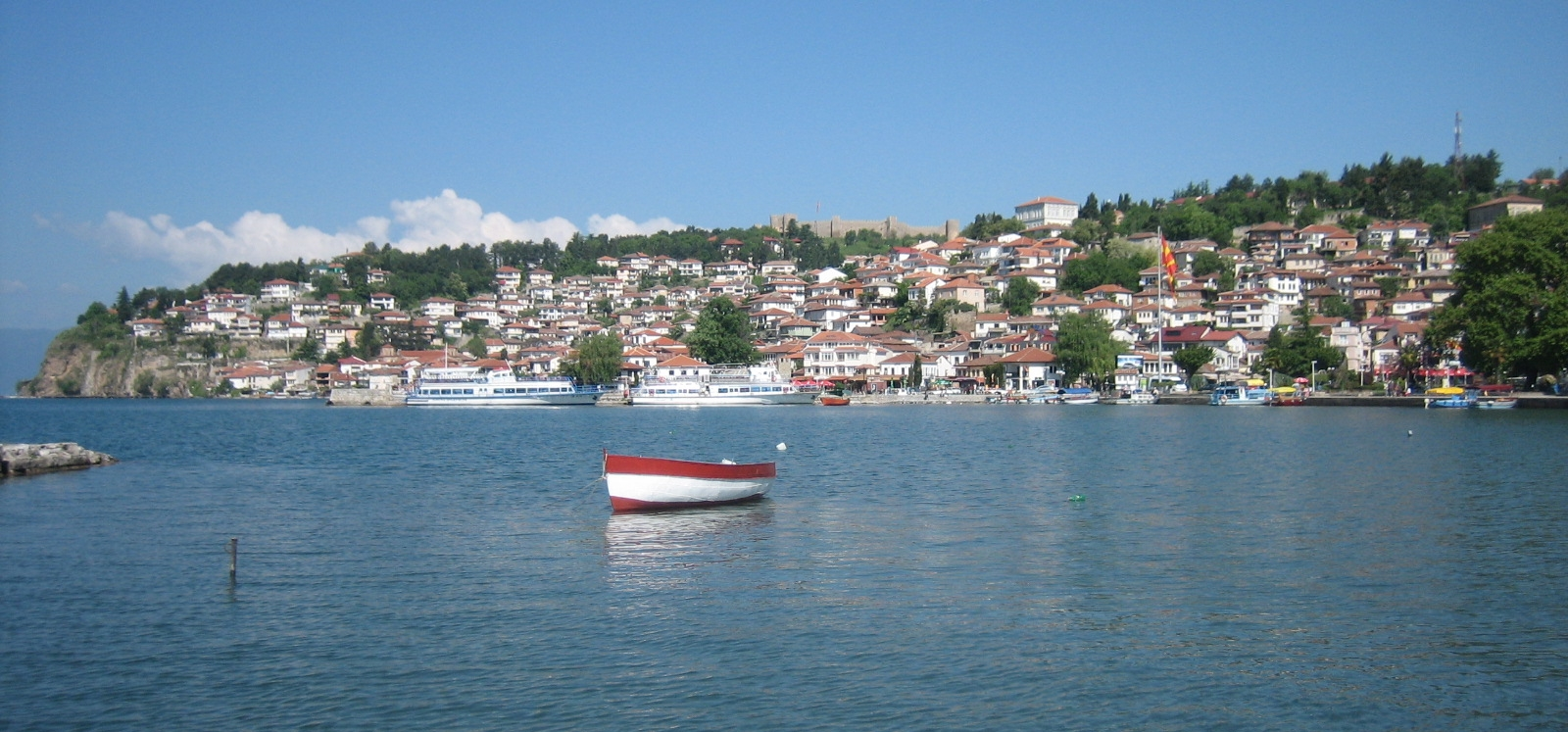
Ohrid is a popular tourist destination in 2012.

Tourism in North Macedonia is a large factor of the nation's economy. The country's large abundance of natural and cultural attractions make it suitable for tourism.

In 2019, North Macedonia received 1,184,963 tourist arrivals out of which 757,593 were foreign.

=== Energy ===
In September 2019, it was said that "thermal power plants account for 842 MW of North Macedonia’s total power generation capacity of 1.41 GW, with hydroelectricity and wind accounting for 553.6 MW and 36.8 MW, respectively." There are 20 economically-exploitable locations for coal in the country, whose total geological reserves are estimated at 2,5 billion tons. There exist four hydroelectric reservoirs, located at: Pelagonia, Kičevo, Mariovo and Tikveš. The first two produce energy, while the latter two are speculative.

=== Mining and metallurgy ===
The country has been home to mines since at least the Roman era. Gold, silver, lead, copper, iron, nickel, zinc, gypsum and sulfur have been or are now being economically exploited. Marble has since Ancient Greek days been quarried at Sivec.

== Trade ==
Exports of North Macedonia by product category (2019) Chemical products Transportation Machines Mineral products Plastics and rubbers Metals Foodstuffs Precious metals Textiles Instruments Animal products Vegetable products Paper goods Footwear and headwear Miscellaneous Stone and glass Wood products Animal and vegetable bi-products Animal hides Arts and antiques Weapons

North Macedonia remains committed to pursuing membership in the European Union (EU) and NATO. It became a full World Trade Organization (WTO) member in April 2003. Following a 1997 cooperation agreement with the EU, North Macedonia signed a Stabilization and Association Agreement with the EU in April 2001, giving North Macedonia duty-free access to European markets. In December 2005, it moved a step forward, obtaining candidate country status for EU accession. North Macedonia has had a foreign trade deficit since 1994, which reached a record high of $2.873 billion in 2008, or 30.2% of GDP. Total trade in 2010 (imports plus exports of goods and services) was $8.752 billion, and the trade deficit amounted to $2.149 billion, or 23.4% of GDP. In the first 8 months of 2011, total trade was $7.470 billion and the trade deficit was $1.778 billion. A significant 56.5% of North Macedonia's total trade was with EU countries. North Macedonia's major trading partners are Germany, Greece, Serbia, Bulgaria, Russia, and Italy. In 2010, total trade between North Macedonia and the United States was $116.6 million, and in the first 8 months of 2011 it was $65 million. U.S. meat, mainly poultry, and electrical machinery and equipment have been particularly attractive to North Macedonia importers. Principal exports from North Macedonia to the United States are tobacco, apparel, iron, and steel.

North Macedonia has bilateral free trade agreements with Ukraine, Turkey, and the European Free Trade Association (EFTA—Switzerland, Norway, Iceland, and Liechtenstein). Bilateral agreements with Albania, Bosnia and Herzegovina, Croatia, Serbia, Montenegro, Kosovo, and Moldova were replaced by membership in the Central European Free Trade Agreement (CEFTA). North Macedonia also has concluded an "Agreement for Promotion and Protection of Foreign Direct Investments" with Albania, Austria, Bosnia and Herzegovina, Bulgaria, Belarus, Belgium, Luxembourg, Germany, Egypt, Iran, Italy, India, Spain, Serbia, Montenegro, People's Republic of China, South Korea, Malaysia, Poland, Romania, Russia, Slovenia, Turkey, Ukraine, Hungary, Finland, France, the Netherlands, Croatia, Czech Republic, Switzerland, and Sweden.

As of 2020, the country had signed free trade agreements with the Central European Free Trade Agreement (CEFTA), the Stabilisation and Association Agreement with the European Union, the European Free Trade Association (EFTA) with Switzerland, Norway, Iceland, and Liechtenstein, and bilateral agreements with Turkey and Ukraine.

=== Free Economic Zones ===
In a bid to attract more interest from domestic and foreign investors after 2000 the government has pursued a Free economic zone (FEZ) policy, in which more than a dozen geographically disparate FEZs have sprouted. One benefit is a tax holiday for 10 years. The social contribution rate hovered at approximately 30% for the five-year period to 2019.

== Data ==
Year	GDP (in bil. US$ PPP)	GDP per capita (in US$ PPP)	GDP (in bil. US$ nominal)	GDP per capita (in US$ nominal)	GDP growth rate
1992	12.5	6,470	2.4	1,264	n/a
1993	11.8	6,097	2.7	1,384	-7.5%
1994	11.9	6,084	3.6	1,824	-1.8%
1995	12.0	6,107	4.7	2,387	-1.1%
1996	12.4	6,250	4.6	2,348	1.2%
1997	12.7	6,423	3.9	1,980	1.4%
1998	13.3	6,683	3.8	1,889	3.4%
1999	14.1	7,041	3.9	1,932	4.3%
2000	15.1	7,498	3.8	1,878	4.5%
2001	14.9	7,407	3.7	1,840	-3.1%
2002	15.4	7,614	4.0	1,974	1.5%
2003	16.0	7,918	4.9	2,441	2.2%
2004	17.2	8,527	5.7	2,810	4.7%
2005	18.6	9,289	6.3	3,120	4.7%
2006	20.2	10,123	6.9	3,440	5.1%
2007	22.1	11,134	8.3	4,204	6.5%
2008	23.7	12,039	9.9	5,027	5.5%
2009	23.8	12,148	9.4	4,799	-0.4%
2010	24.9	12,790	9.4	4,837	3.4%
2011	26.0	13,421	10.5	5,419	2.3%
2012	26.4	13,662	9.8	5,053	-0.5%
2013	27.6	14,354	10.8	5,629	2.9%
2014	29.1	15,175	11.4	5,933	3.6%
2015	30.5	15,949	10.1	5,264	3.9%
2016	31.7	16,612	10.7	5,605	2.8%
2017	32.6	17,161	11.3	5,971	1.1%
2018	34.9	18,460	12.7	6,720	2.9%
2019	37.9	20,223	12.6	6,720	3.9%
2020	37.1	19,962	12.4	6,673	-4.7%
2021	41.1	22,373	14.0	7,625	4.5%
2022	45.0	24,572	13.7	7,499	2.2%
2023	47.1	25,718	14.8	8,063	1.0%
2024	49.3	26,912	15.9	8,659	2.2%
