= Tinex =

Supermarket chain in North Macedonia

- Type: Discount and supermarket chain
- Industry: Retail
- Founded: 1994
- Headquarters: Skopje, North Macedonia
- Number of locations: 34 stores
- Products: Supermarkets
- Number of employees: 1,000
- Website: www.tinex.com.m

Tinex is a chain of supermarkets in North Macedonia. Tinex was founded in the 1990s, with its first store opening in Skopje.
