= Veropoulos Skopje =

- Native name: Веропулос Скопје (Macedonian); Veropulos Shkup (Albanian)
- Romanized name: Veropulos Skopje
- Industry: Retail
- Founded: 1997 in Skopje, Macedonia
- Owner: Veropoulos
- Number of employees: 300

Veropoulos Skopje (Macedonian: Веропулос Скопје, Albanian: Veropulos Shkup) is a subsidiary of the Greek retail company Veropoulos in North Macedonia stationed in the capital Skopje.
