= Komercijalna banka Skopje =

Macedonian banking company

Coordinates: 41°59′49″N 21°26′42″E

Komercijalna Banka AD Skopje
- Native name: • Комерцијална банка АД Скопје
- Formerly: Komunalna Banka
- Type: Bank
- Industry: Financial services
- Founded: 1955; 71 years ago
- Headquarters: Skopje, North Macedonia
- Area served: North Macedonia
- Products: Retail, investment and corporate banking, asset management
- Net income: ▲€29.99 million (2018)
- Total assets: ▲€1.894 billion (2018)
- Total equity: ▲€217.71 million (2018)
- Website: kb.com.mk

Komercijalna Banka AD Skopje (Macedonian: Комерцијална банка АД Скопје, KBS) is a commercial bank with headquarters in Skopje, North Macedonia. From its inception in 1955 to 1970, it was known as Komunalna Banka Skopje.

== History ==
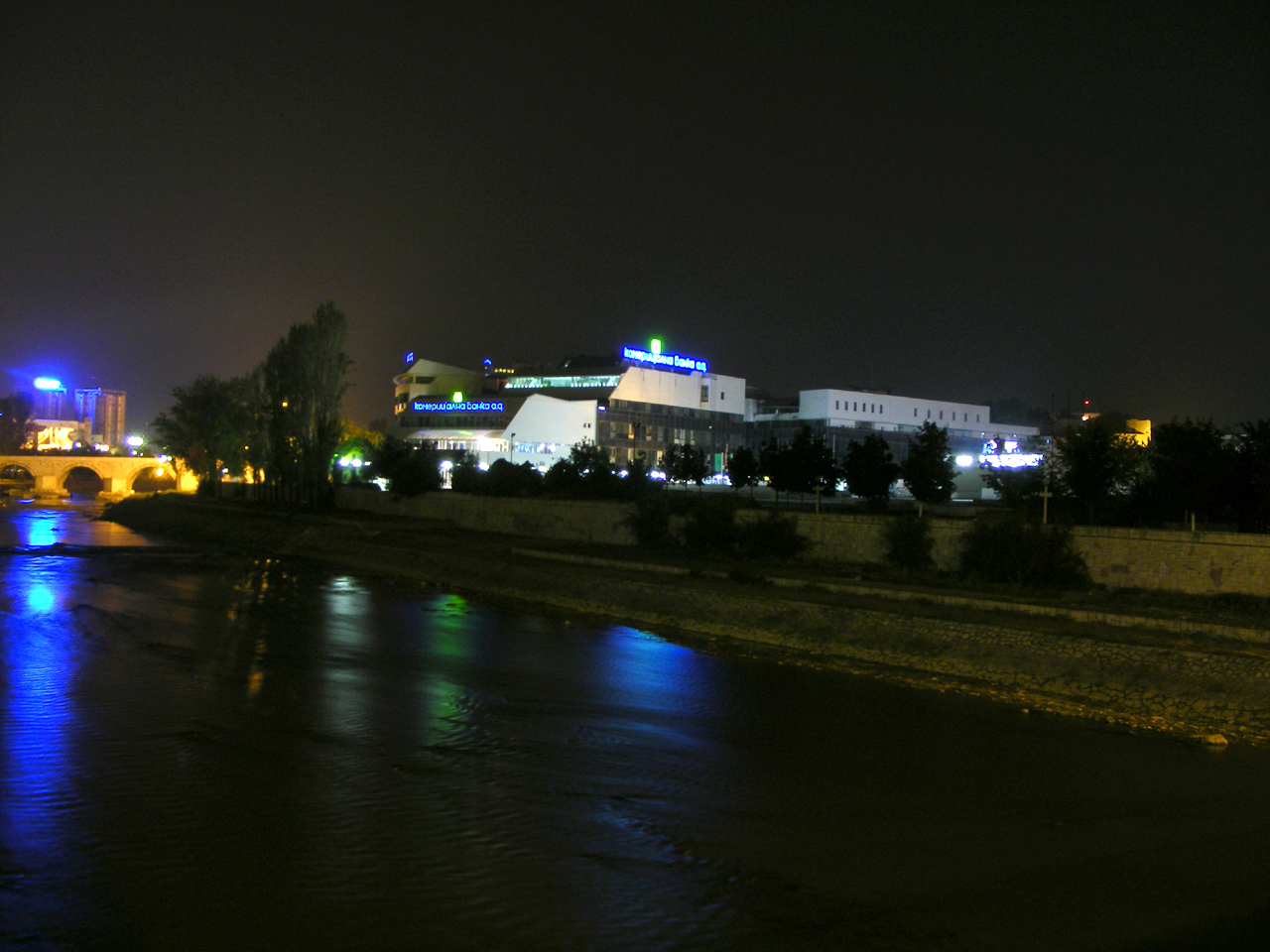
The main building of Komercijalna banka at night

Komunalna Banka Skopje was established in 1955, specialized for approving housing loans and financing construction operations.

Since 01/01/1966 Komunalna Banka was transformed into a mixed type of bank and gets a new name, Komercijalno-Investiciona Banka Skopje. The three leading banks in the Republic of Macedonia, Stopanska Banka Skopje, Komercijalno-Investiciona Banka Skopje and Bitola, were integrated in the year 1971 in a bank operating under the name Stopanska Banka - Branch Skopje. This bank was the first bank that introduces current accounts for the citizens.

In 1980 Komercijalna Banka Skopje exited lineup with Stopanska banka Skopje.

In 1989, the Law on Banks and other financial institutions was brought, and in 1990 the Bank was transformed into the first joint stock company in the country and carries the current name Komercijalna Banka AD Skopje.

By December 2005, Komercijalna Banka's market share reached 26.3 percent of total assets, making it the country's largest bank ahead of Stopanska Banka.

== Operations ==
Komercijalna Banka Skopje is a universal bank licensed for performing all types of banking operations, combining the functions of commercial banking, savings deposits and investments, as well as banking services provided to the citizens and enterprises in the domain of domestic and international payment operations.

== See also ==
- List of banks in North Macedonia
- List of banks in Yugoslavia
