= National Bank of Yugoslavia =

Former central bank

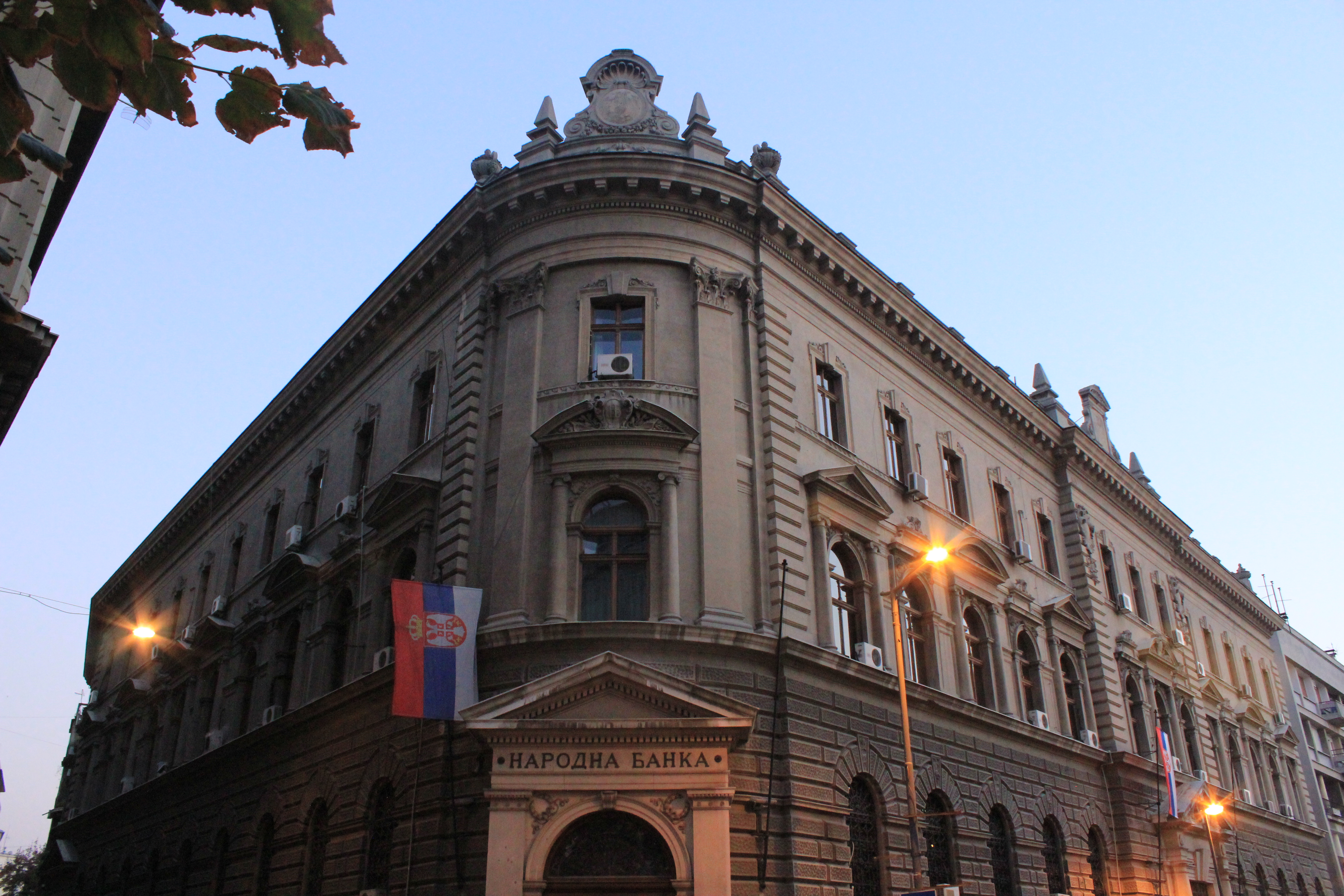
National Bank Building, Belgrade, former seat of the National Bank

The National Bank of Yugoslavia (Serbo-Croatian: Narodna banka Jugoslavije, NBJ) was the central bank of Yugoslavia, succeeding the National Bank of the Kingdom of Serbia in Belgrade in 1920. It was formally known as the National Bank of the Kingdom of Serbs, Croats and Slovenes until 3 October 1929, and as the National Bank of the Kingdom of Yugoslavia from then until the invasion of Yugoslavia in April 1941.

Between 1941 and 1944 during the occupation of Yugoslavia, its former operations were taken over by the Croatian State Bank in the Independent State of Croatia and the German-controlled Serbian National Bank in occupied Serbia, while the rest of the Yugoslav territory was forcibly annexed to the Bulgarian, German, Hungarian and Italian currency zones.

The Yugoslav central bank was re-established in 1945 by the Communist authorities and renamed the National Bank of the Federal People’s Republic of Yugoslavia on 15 January 1946, shortened to National Bank of Yugoslavia in March 1961. Following the breakup of Yugoslavia, the bank operated in Belgrade in the reduced geographical scope of the Federal Republic of Yugoslavia.

== Interwar period ==
On 27 June 1920, the Law on the National Bank of the Kingdom of Serbs, Croats and Slovenes ratified the adoption of that new name by the former National Bank of the Kingdom of Serbia and extended its activity to the whole territory of the recently formed Kingdom of Serbs, Croats and Slovenes, following an agreement between the bank and the government of 20 January 1920. Even though the bank retained the same private shareholders as its Serbian predecessor, it was under the effective control of the government from the start.

In application of the Treaty of Saint-Germain-en-Laye, the National Bank received a significant amount of gold bullion from the Austro-Hungarian Bank in Vienna and took over its branches in the significant parts of the new country that had been part of the Habsburg monarchy, namely Slovenia, Croatia, Vojvodina, Bosnia and Herzegovina: these included Zagreb, Varaždin, Split, Osijek, Ljubljana, Maribor, Sarajevo, Mostar, Banja Luka, Zemun, Novi Sad, Veliki Bečkerek, Subotica, Pančevo, and Vršac. Meanwhile, in early 1920 a conflict of competence with the Zagreb-based National Bank was resolved, as a result of which the Croatian upstart was renamed Slavenska Banka. The transition of the Austro-Hungarian Bank's branches was only completed in August 1921, and the gold transfer in late 1922.

The monetary transition was similarly complex. In the war's immediate aftermath, much of the country still used the Austro-Hungarian krone, temporarily rebranded the Yugoslav krone, rather than the Yugoslav dinar. The exchange of krones against dinars was complex and protracted. It a first phase starting 1 February 1920 and ending on 3 June 1920, the stamped Austrian-Hungarian krone notes were exchanged for new notes denominated in both dinars and crowns, with a new ratio of four crowns for one dinar, which allowed the rebranded crown to keep legal tender status. Then in 1921 the double-named currency concept was abandoned and another exchange replaced the dinar-crown notes with ones exclusively denominated in dinar, after which the crown eventually lost legal tender status on 1 January 1923. The poorly organized transition was marked by widespread fraud as krone banknotes printed in Hungary were imported in contraband into Yugoslavia.

In 1930, the bank constructed a new facility for the production of banknotes and coins in the Topčider neighborhood of Belgrade. In May 1931, it eventually joined the Gold exchange standard, and its governance was simultaneously reorganized, practically transferring any residual control of the private shareholders to the government. By then, the bank's largest shareholders were banks rather than individuals, as well as government agencies even though the latter's aggregate share was limited to one-fifth of total equity capital.

Immediately afterwards, Yugoslavia was severely affected during the European banking crisis of 1931. Communal politics played a large role in the policy reaction. By the end of 1930, none of Yugoslavia's twelve largest banks, which in aggregate represented half of the system's total assets, was headquartered in Serbia (or Montenegro): eight were in Zagreb, effectively the country's financial center despite the presence of large state-owned credit institutions in Belgrade, three in Ljubljana, and one in Sarajevo. Faced with major turmoil, the National Bank neglected any concern about the survival of these "non-Serbian" banks and announced on 8 August 1931 that it would not grant any new funding to any bank, focusing instead on defending the currency. This led all domestic banks, which were weakened by illiquid investments in industrial companies and from April 1932 by a government-imposed moratorium on agricultural debt repayment, to a state of de facto insolvency that lasted essentially until the German in 1941, even though foreign-invested banks fared better thanks to external financial support.

In May 1939, following the Italian invasion of Albania the month before and the earlier occupation of Czechoslovakia by Nazi Germany, the National Bank transferred the bulk of its gold reserves to safety at the Bank of England and Federal Reserve Bank of New York. In the second half of 1940 the National Bank, whose capital had been held since its creation in the 1880s by about twenty Serbian merchant families, was nationalized, by way of an equity injection after which state institutions held 52 percent of its share capital, financed by bonds issued by the State Mortgage Bank of Yugoslavia.

By 1939, the National Bank had branches in Banja Luka, Bitola, Cetinje, Dubrovnik, Ljubljana, Maribor, Mostar, Niš, Novi Sad, Osijek, Pančevo, Petrovgrad, Šabac, Sarajevo, Skopje, Split, Subotica, Sušak, Varaždin, Vršac, and Zagreb.

== World War II ==
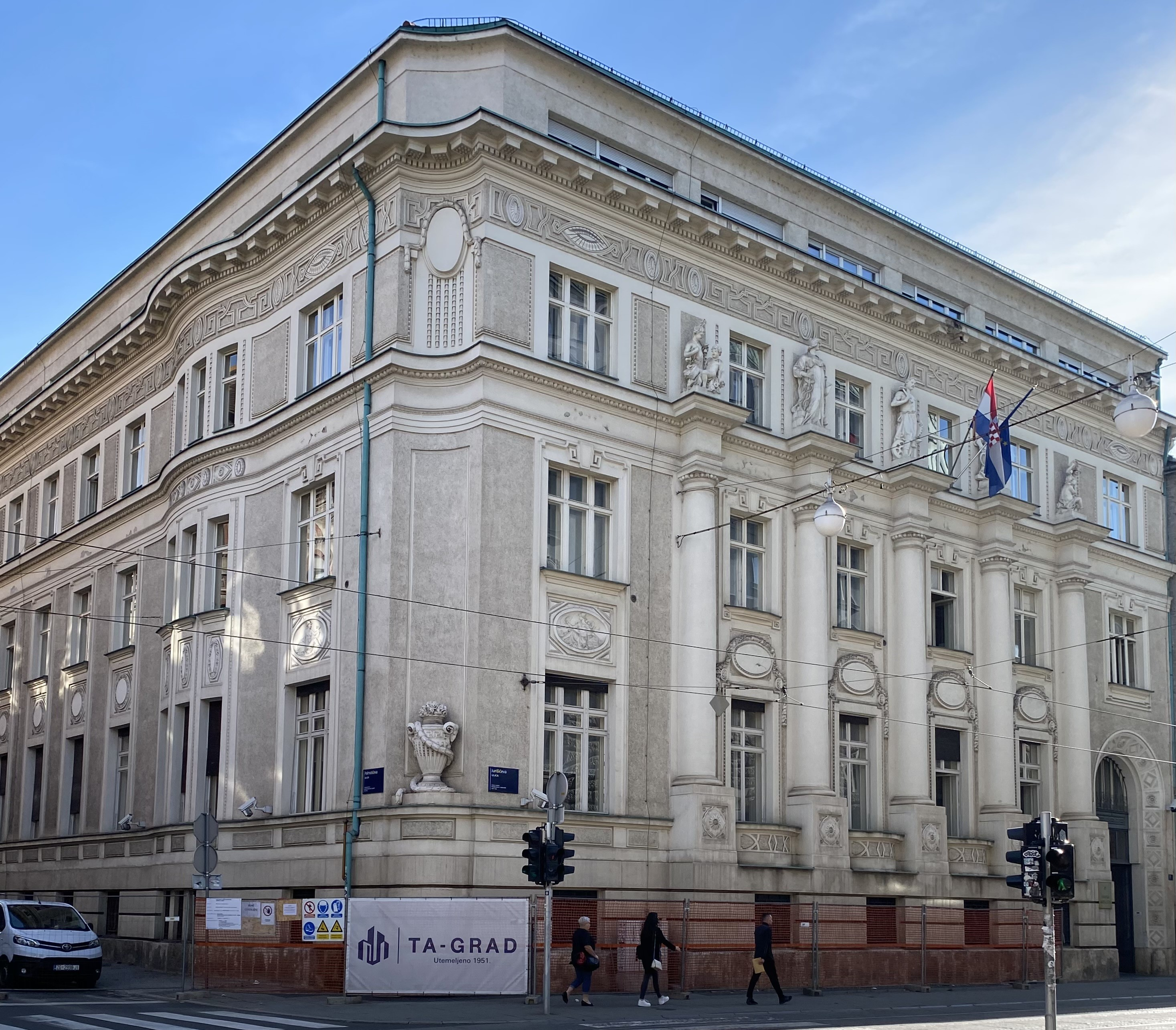
Building at Jurišićeva Ulica 17, originally the former Zagreb branch of the Austro-Hungarian Bank that became the wartime seat of the Croatian State Bank

On 29 May 1941, a decree of the German occupation authorities pronounced the National Bank's liquidation, and it was replaced two days later by the Serbian National Bank. The occupation forces confiscated 11 tons of gold from the bank's vaults, only a fraction of the 53 tons that had been transferred to safety abroad during the previous two years. The pro-Nazi official Milan Radosavljević, who had been reappointed Governor in December 1940, retained his position in the new entity, even though he had no independence under the control of two more powerful German officials, the General Agent for Economic Affairs and the Banking Commissioner. The Serbian National Bank's activity was primarily oriented towards financing the collaborationist government.

The Yugoslav government-in-exile immediately issued a decree depriving Radosavljević of his position, and appointed Dobrivoje Lazarević as Governor. Unlike other governments-in-exile, however, it did not match these actions with the establishment of an administrative structure for the central bank in foreign territory. The Yugoslav Partisans had no monetary authority of their own and opportunistically used different currencies in different locations.

The operations of the National Bank in the Independent State of Croatia were taken over by the Croatian State Bank, established in Zagreb on 10 May 1941. The State Bank's main activity was to finance the Independent State's government, whose ability to collect tax revenue was severely limited by the war circumstances. It had branches in Banja Luka, Dubrovnik, Karlovac, Mostar, Osijek, Sarajevo, Varaždin, and Zemun, most of which were taken over from the National Bank of Yugoslavia.

Other parts of the dismembered Yugoslavia came under the monetary authority of the Reichsbank (e.g. Northern Carniola and Lower Styria), Bank of Italy (e.g. Province of Ljubljana, Dalmatia, Governorate of Montenegro), Hungarian National Bank (e.g. the Banat), National Bank of Albania (e.g. Kosovo), and Bulgarian National Bank (most of Macedonia).

In November 1944, after Belgrade was taken over by the Partisans, the Serbian National Bank was liquidated. In February 1945, the Communist authorities dismissed the National Bank officials in exile. New Yugoslav dinar banknotes, printed in the Soviet Union, were introduced from 20 April 1945 to 9 July 1945.

== Communist era ==
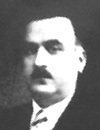
Tanasije Zdravković was the first Communist-era Governor of the National Bank, appointed in late 1945

The era of the Socialist Federal Republic of Yugoslavia was marked by frequent financial sector reforms displaying the whole range of options from radical decentralization to the most extreme centralization, mirroring political factions sometimes labelled respectively "pluralistic" and "monistic", even as the entire sector was continuously state-owned. In 1945, the Communist authorities created six new state regional banks in the newly established republics. On 12 October 1946, a government decree formally established the National Bank of the Federative People's Republic of Yugoslavia. Starting around that time, all existing banks were liquidated and their preserved operations taken over by the National Bank or by the State Investment Bank of Yugoslavia, which in turn was merged into the National Bank in 1952. From 1952 to 1955, Yugoslavia exhibited a pure monobank system in which the National Bank was the single financial intermediary for the entire country.

From 1955, the monobank framework was softened with the re-establishment of communal (local) banks and of specialized banks. The latter included the Yugoslav Bank for Foreign Trade (1955, later known as Jugobanka), Yugoslav Investment Bank (1956, later known as Investbanka), and Yugoslav Agricultural Bank (1958), complemented in 1978 with the Yugoslav Bank for International Economic Cooperation. In 1961–1962, "regional banks" were established in each of the country's six Republics. More freedom to create investment banks and commercial banks was introduced in 1965, further eroding the overwhelming dominance of the National Bank. As a consequence, many new banks were formed in the 1960s and 1970s, including non-depository "internal banks" (financial arms of companies and other public bodies) and depository "basic banks". Among these, Beobanka and Beogradska banka became the system's dominant banks together with Jugobanka and Investbanka, but all would have had to be liquidated in 2002 after they were found insolvent together with 80 percent of what then remained of the Yugoslav banking sector.

In 1971–1972, a major reform resulted in the establishment of the System of National Banks which replaced the NBJ as Yugoslavia's collective monetary authority. A separate National Bank was established in each of the country's six Republics and two Autonomous Provinces, forming an integrated system together with the NBJ, with a Board of Governors consisting of the respective heads of the NBJ and of the eight sub-federal National Banks. The latter were autonomous institutions under the law of their respective sub-federal jurisdictions.

The policy framework was associated with an increasingly dramatic loss of control over inflation, which reached an annual average 17.5 percent during the 1970s, 75 percent in the 1980s, and a hyperinflationary regime by the end of 1989. The National Bank accumulated macroeconomically significant losses during that period.

== Breakup of Yugoslavia ==
In January 1991, it was revealed that the Parliament of the Yugoslav Socialist Republic of Serbia had passed secret legislation compelling the respective National Banks of Serbia, Kosovo and Vojvodina to provide $1.8 billion worth of funding without approval or knowledge of the federal government, in egregious breach of the Yugoslav monetary system's legal framework that was described as "theft from the other republics" and "an astonishing act of economic sabotage". This event accelerated the breakup of Yugoslavia, during which the respective National Banks of Bosnia and Herzegovina, Croatia, Macedonia, and Slovenia left the NBJ-centered system and became fully independent central banks for their respective countries.

The bank continued to function in Belgrade under the same name after the breakup of Yugoslavia.

== Buildings ==
The National Bank kept its head office in the National Bank Building, Belgrade, originally erected for the National Bank of the Kingdom of Serbia in 1890, and expanded it in 1922-1925 on designs by the original architect, Konstantin Jovanović. In 1920, it had taken over a number of former branches of the Austro-Hungarian Bank. It then developed a program of construction of new branches, entrusted to architect Bogdan Nestorović, the most prominent of which were those in Dubrovnik, Karlovac, Kragujevac, Mostar, Šabac, and Skopje. The latter was built on a very prominent location, on the spot where the Museum of the Macedonian Struggle was erected in 2008–2011.

In the Communist era, the National Bank took over the previous properties of all previously existing banks in the country. For example, the Southwestern wing of the General Post Office, Belgrade, which had been erected as the seat of Poštanska štedionica in the late interwar period, was used by the National Bank from 1946 to 2006, after which it became the seat of the Constitutional Court of Serbia. Many of these buildings were subsequently reallocated, either to newly created banks or to other organizations.

In the 1970s, some of newly created "national banks" at the level of individual republics or autonomous provinces commissioned new buildings, most notably in Pristina and Skopje, while others appropriated existing properties, such as the National Bank of Slovenia in the former head office of the Ljubljana Credit Bank, the National Bank of Bosnia and Herzegovina in the former branch building of the State Mortgage Bank of Yugoslavia in Sarajevo, and the National Bank of Croatia in the former stock exchange building in Zagreb.

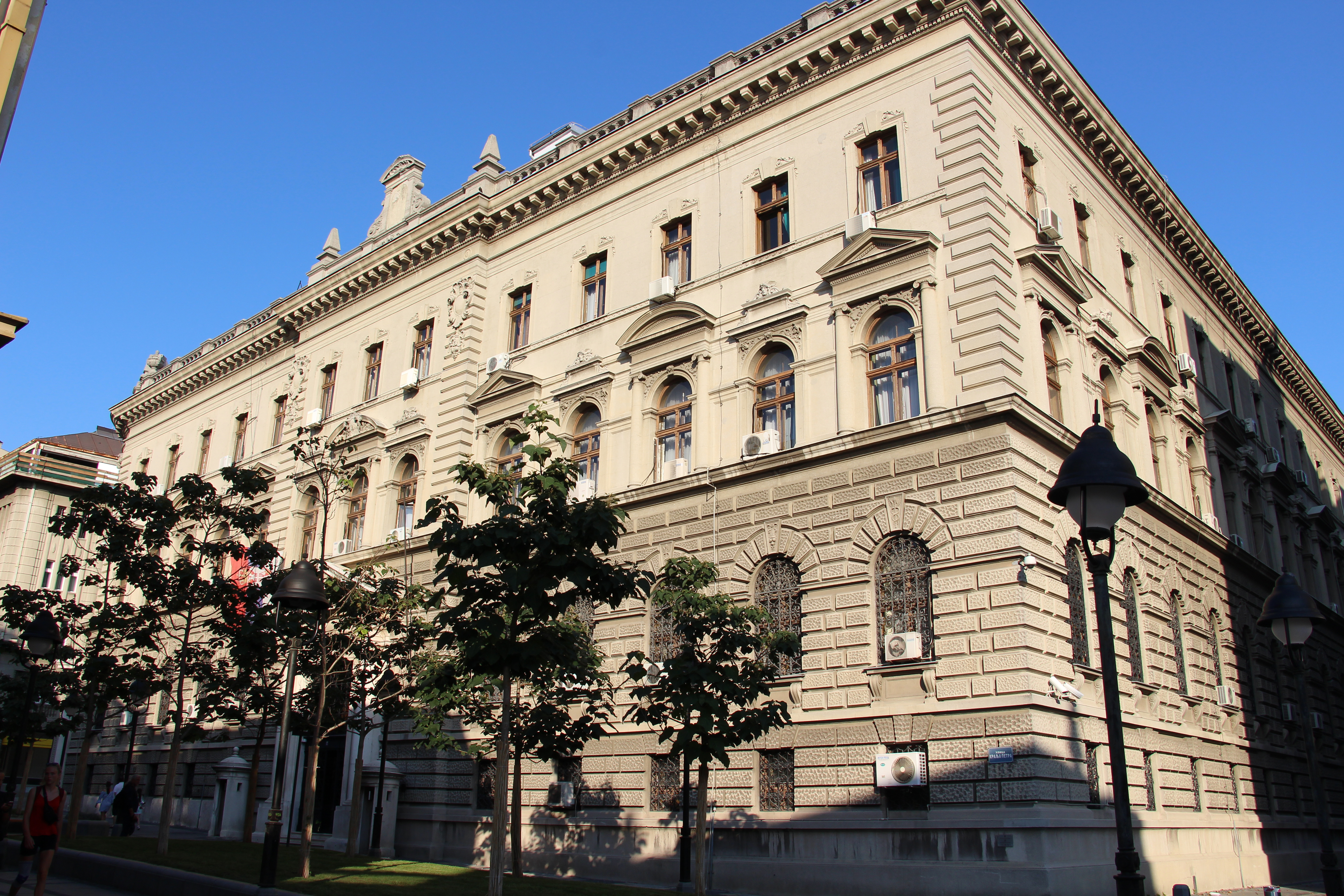
Mid-1920s extension of the National Bank Building, Belgrade

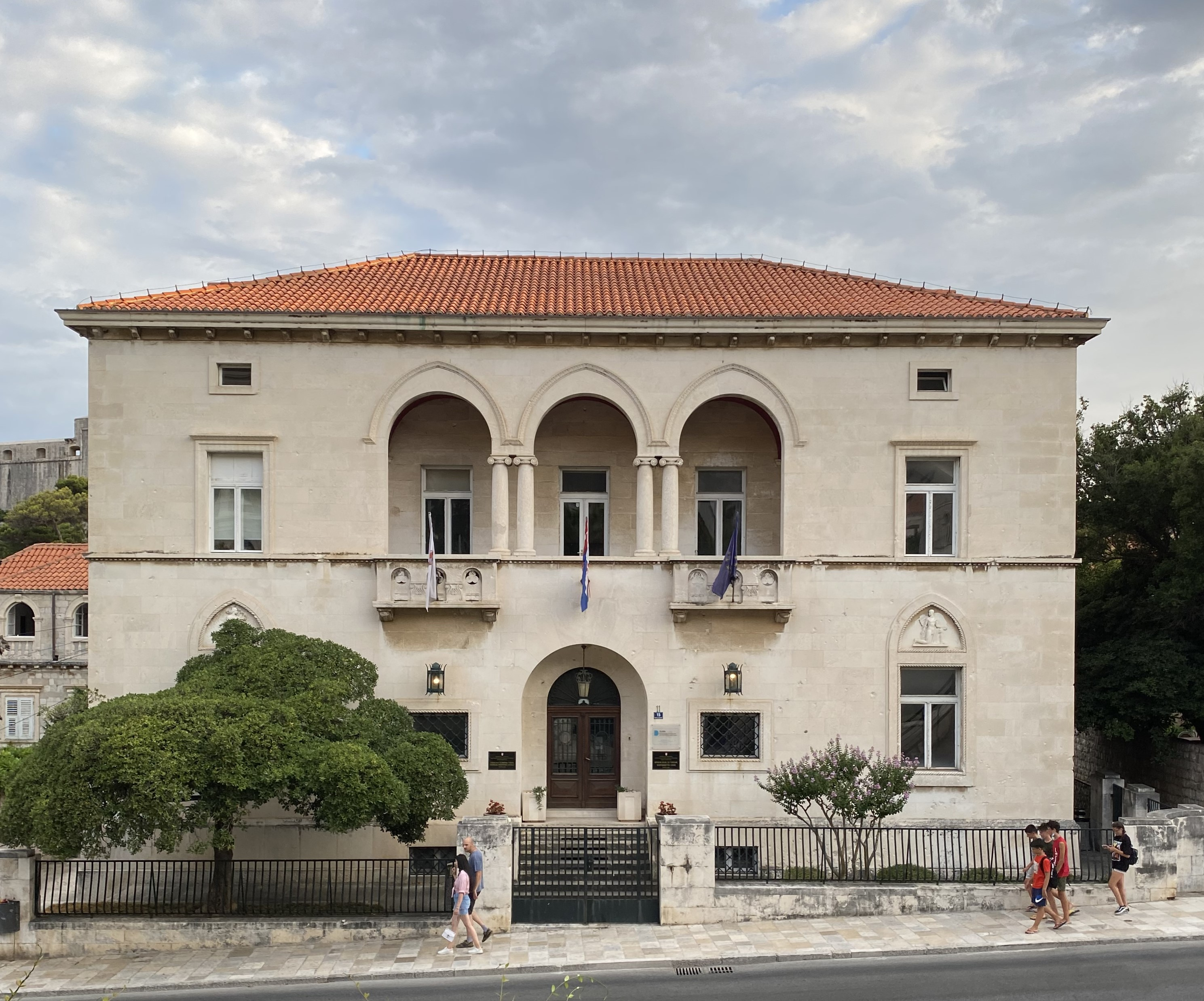
Former branch in Dubrovnik, completed 1936

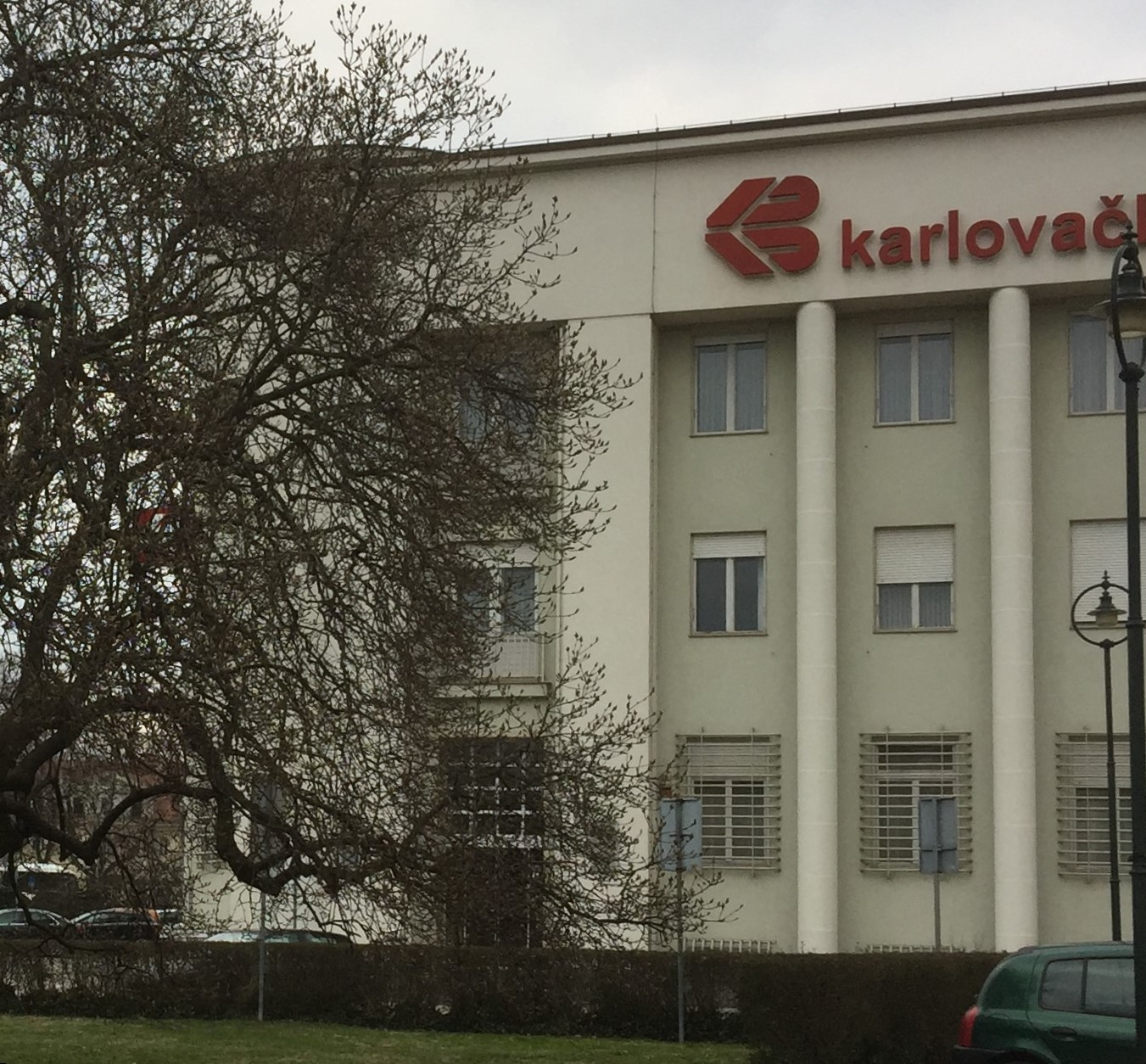
Former branch in Karlovac, completed 1940

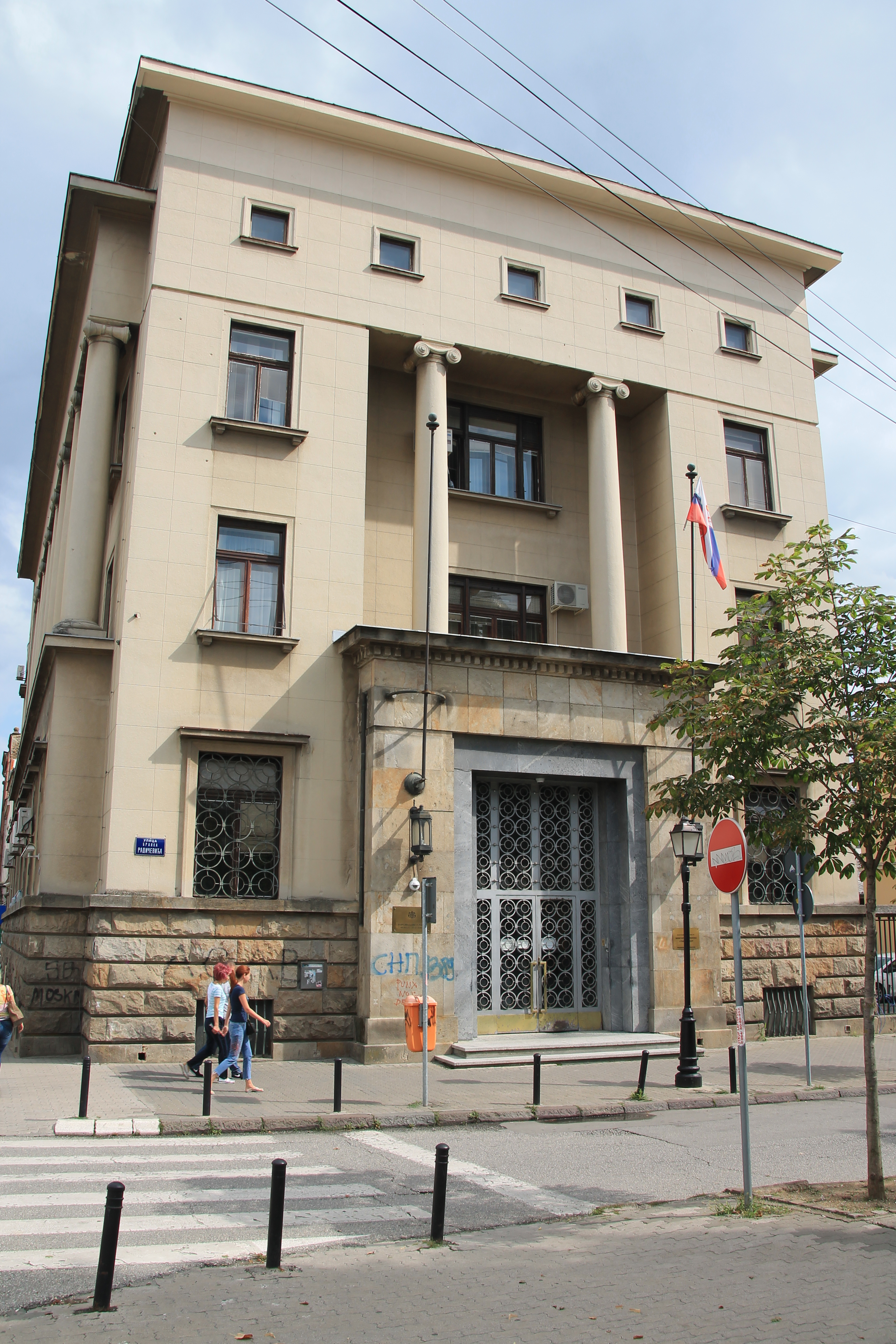
Former branch in Kragujevac, completed 1940

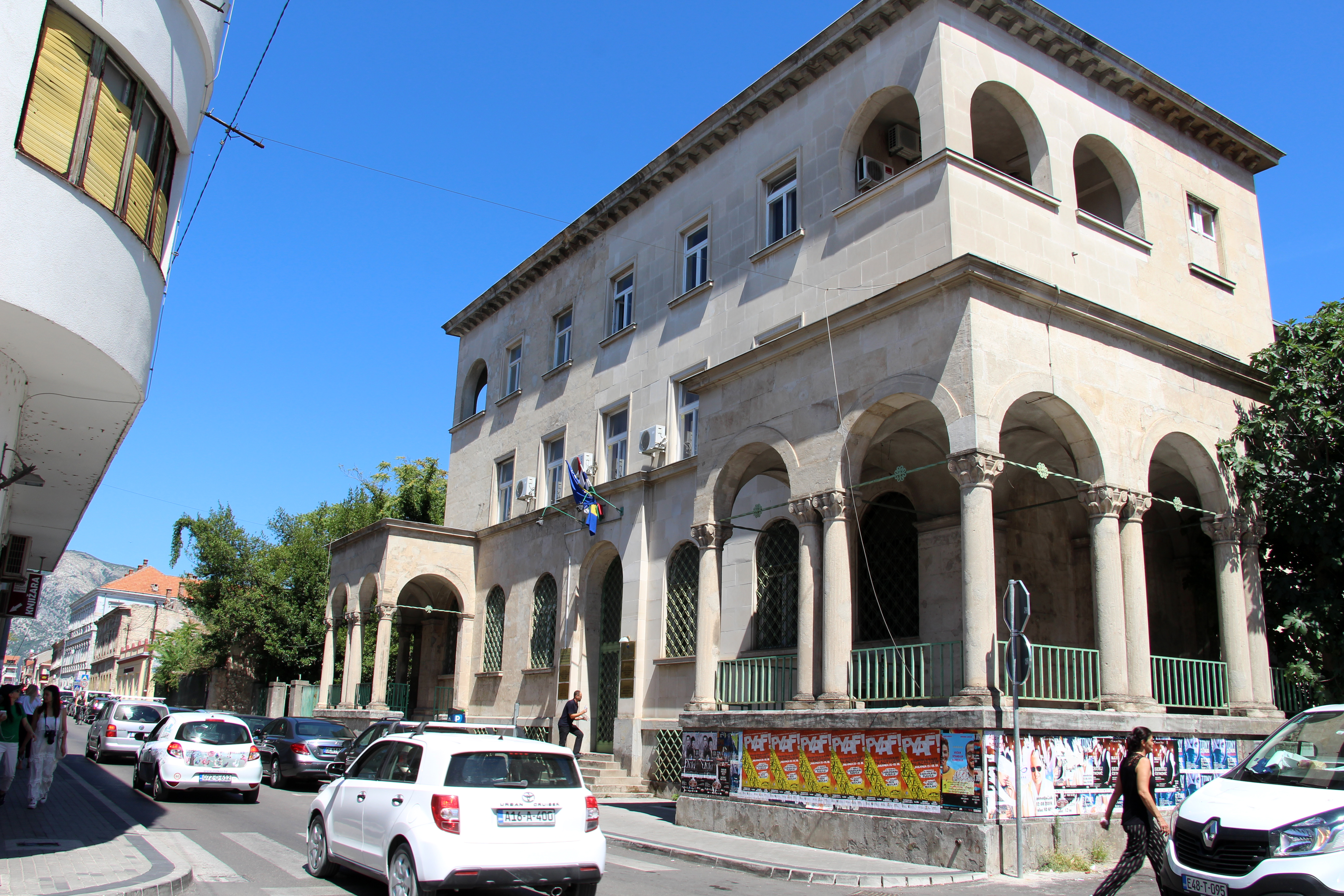
Former branch in Mostar, completed 1937

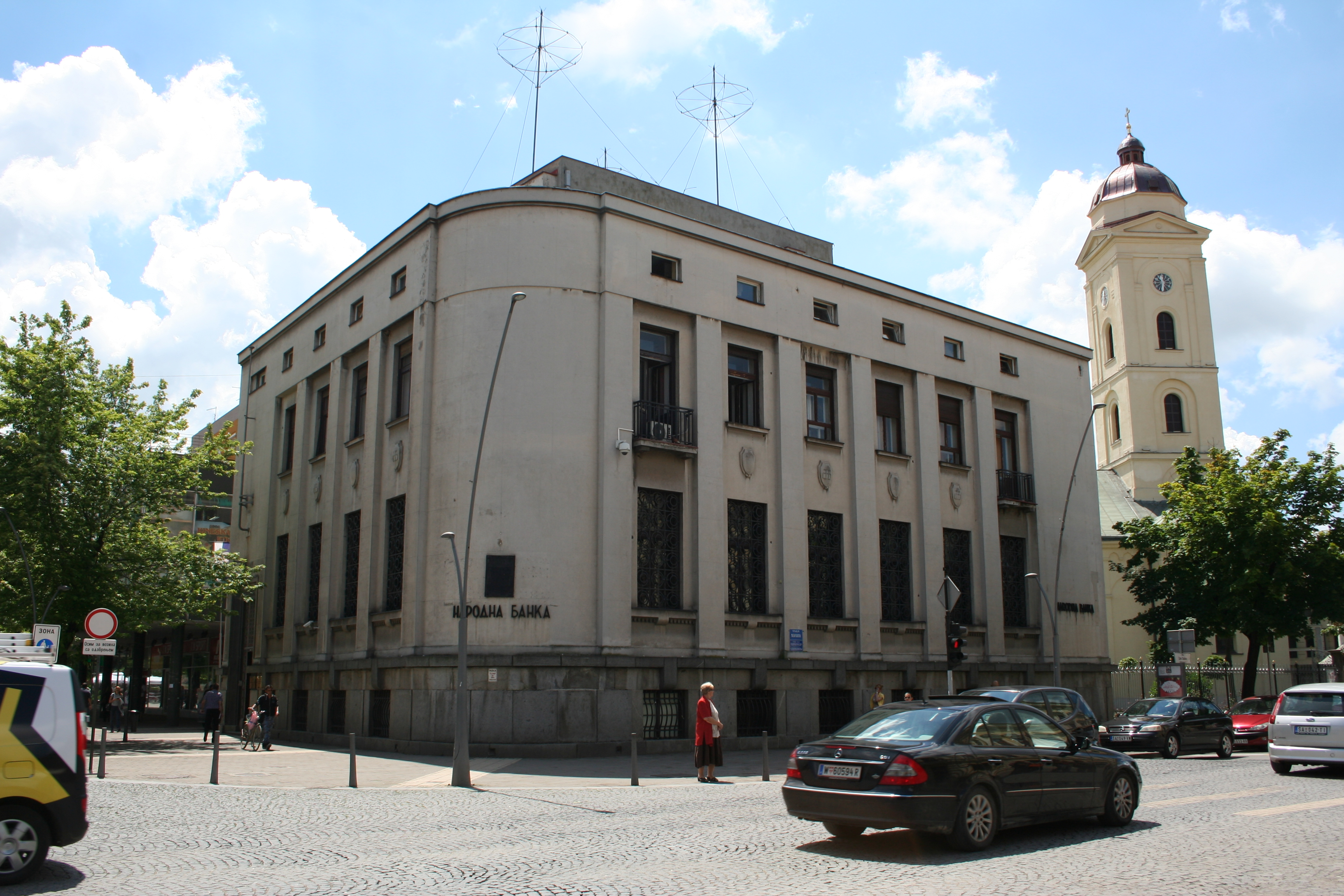
Former branch in Šabac, completed 1938

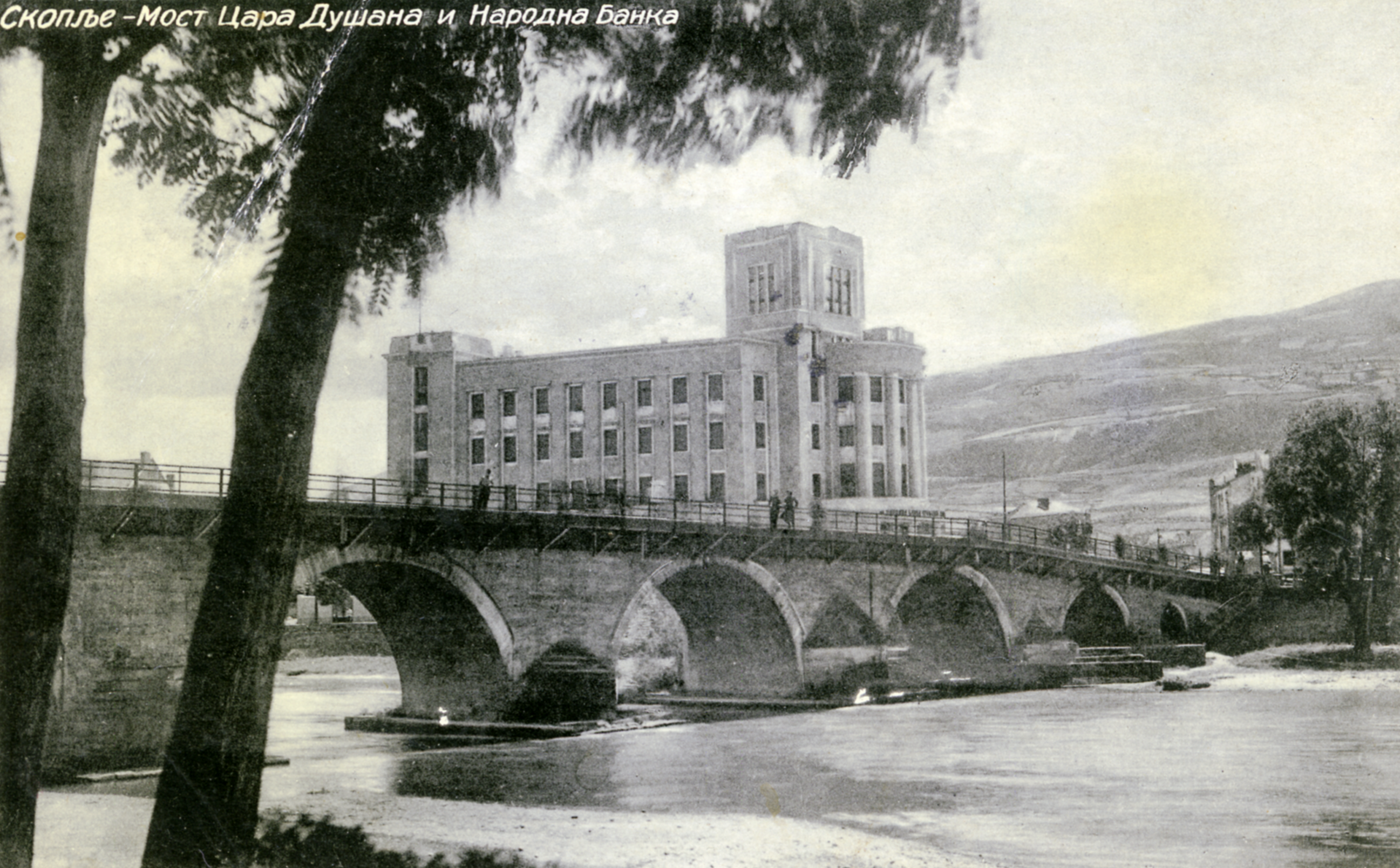
Former branch in Skopje, completed 1933; illustration before 1963

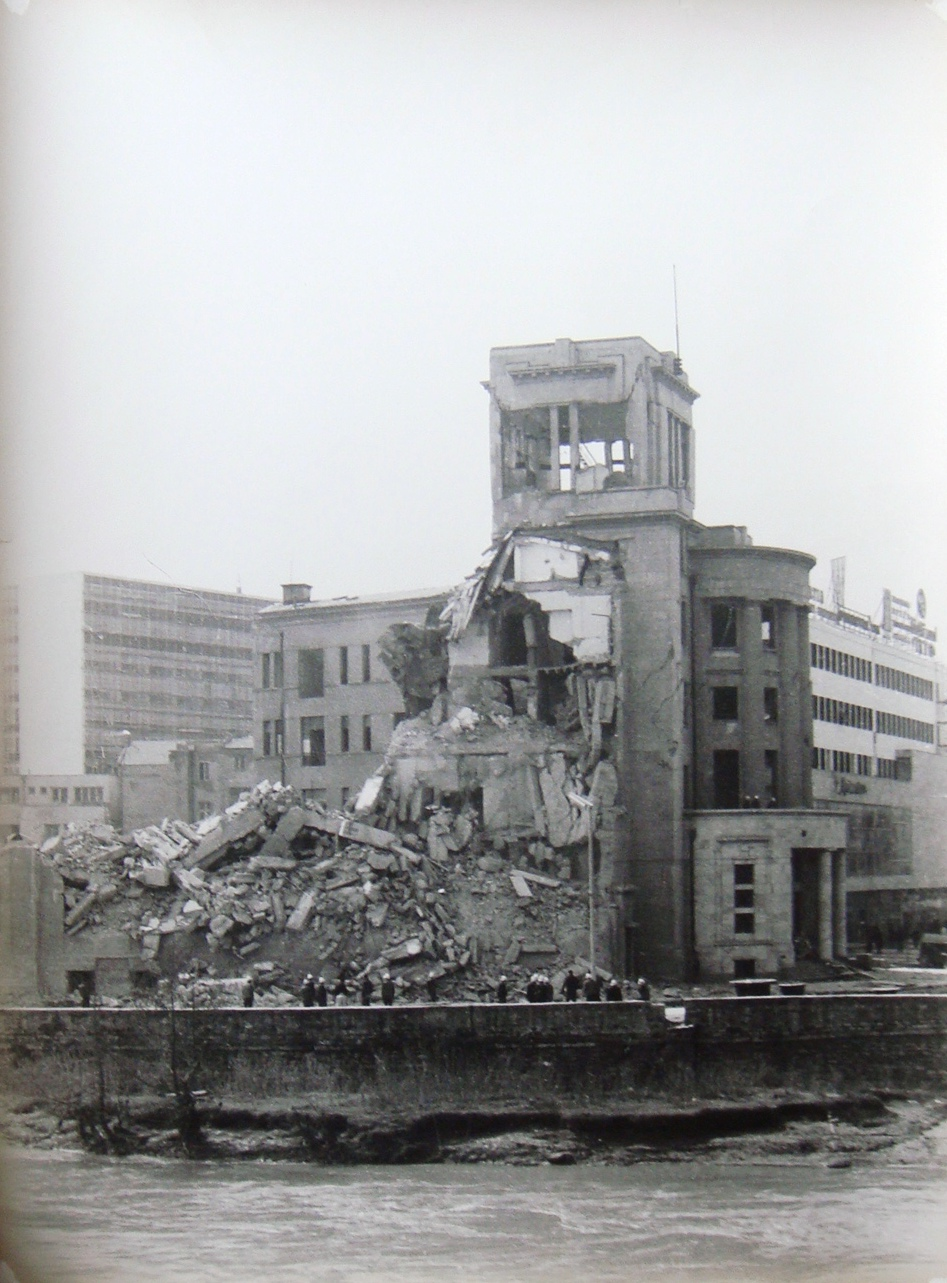
The same building, destroyed by the 1963 Skopje earthquake

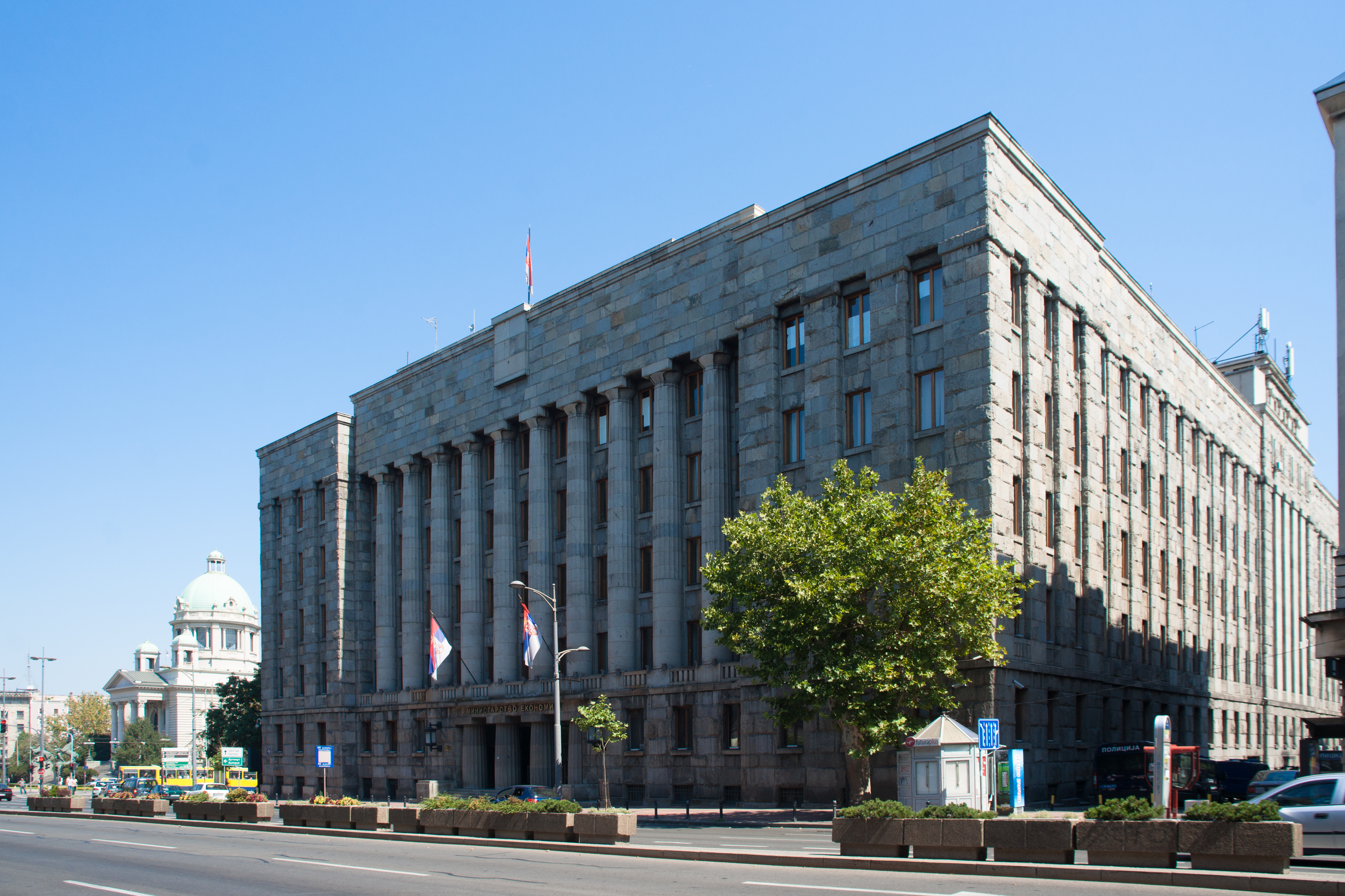
Southwestern wing of the General Post Office, Belgrade, seat of the National Bank of Serbia 1972–1993

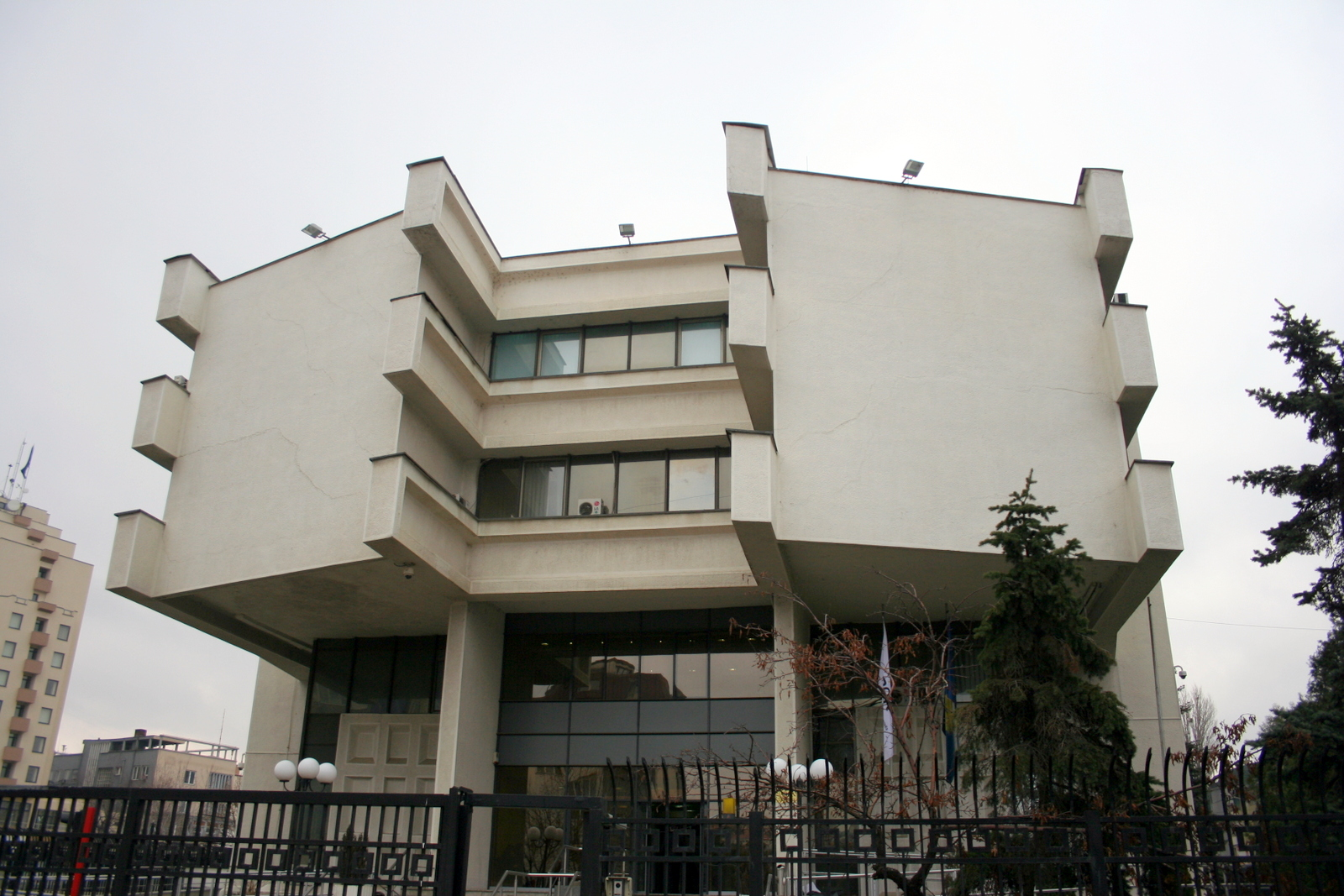
National Bank of Kosovo building in Pristina

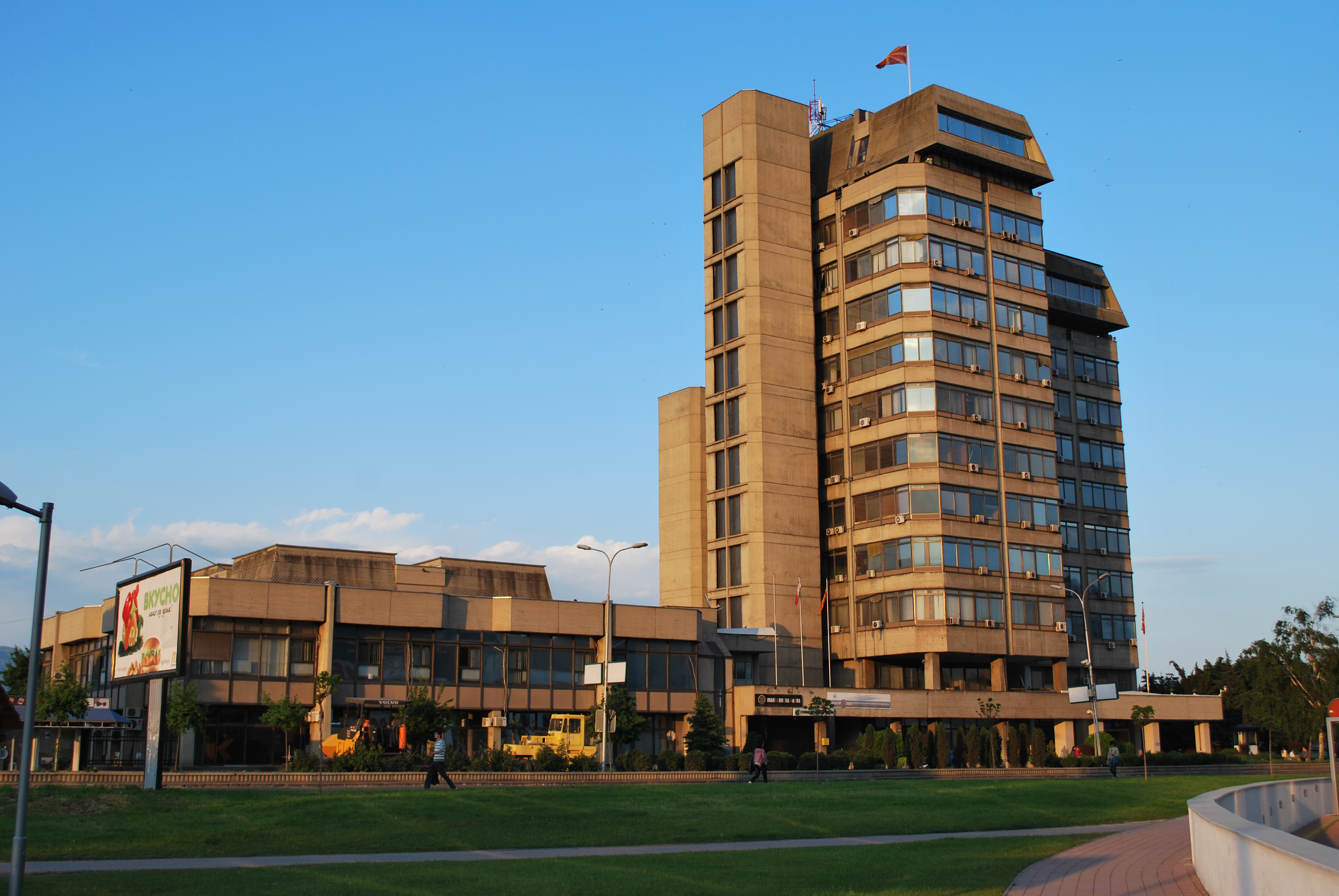
National Bank of Macedonia building in Skopje

== Governors ==
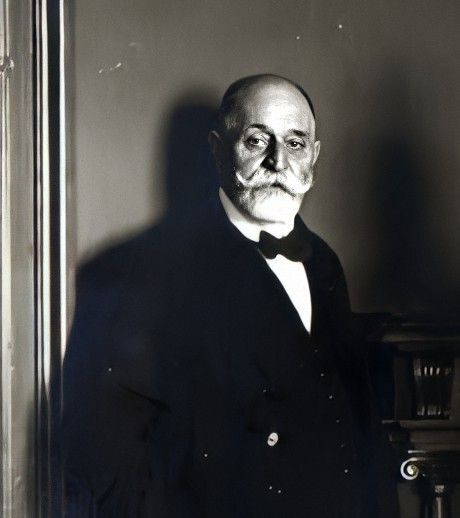
Đorđe Vajfert, last governor of the National Bank of the Kingdom of Serbia and first governor of that of Yugoslavia

=== Kingdom of Yugoslavia ===
- Đorđe Vajfert (1920–1926)
- Ljubomir Srećković (March – June 1928)
- Ignjat J. Bajloni (1928–1934)
- Melko Čingrija (acting, 1934–1935)
- Milan Radosavljević (1935–1939)
- Dragutin K. Protić (1939–1940)
- Milan Radosavljević (1940–1941)

=== World War II ===
- Milan Radosavljević (1941–1944), Serbian National Bank under occupation
- Dobrivoje Lazarević (1941–1944), Yugoslav government-in-exile
- Alexander Hondl (1941–1942), Croatian State Bank under occupation
- Dragutin Toth (1942–1944), Croatian State Bank under occupation

=== Socialist Yugoslavia ===
- Tanasije Zdravković (November 1945 – April 1946)
- Obren Blagojević (May 1946 – December 1948)
- Marijan Dermastija (January 1949 – October 1951)
- Sergej Kraigher (October 1951 – June 1953)
- Vojin Guzina (July 1953 – June 1958)
- Janko Smole (June 1958 – June 1962)
- Nikola Miljanić (June 1962 – May 1969)
- Ivo Perišin (September 1969 – December 1971)
- Branislav Čolanović (March 1972 – June 1977)
- Ksente Bogoev (June 1977 – December 1981)
- Radovan Makić (December 1981 – May 1986)
- Dušan Vlatković (June 1986 – July 1992)

== See also ==
- Banknotes of the Yugoslav dinar
- National Bank of Czechoslovakia
- State Bank of the USSR
- List of banks in Yugoslavia
- List of central banks
