= Privileged National Bank of the Kingdom of Serbia =

Former central bank based in Belgrade

National Bank of the Kingdom of Serbia
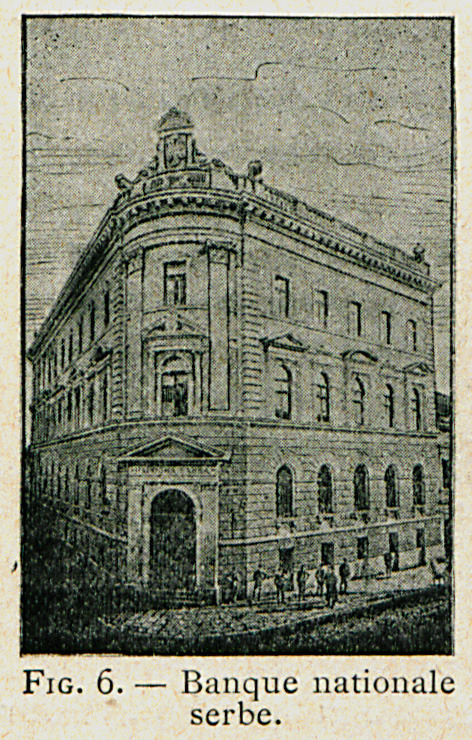
- 1896 illustration depicting the National Bank Building, Belgrade before its expansion in 1922-1925
- Type: Central bank
- Industry: Financial services
- Founded: January 18, 1883
- Defunct: January 26, 1920
- Fate: Merged
- Successor: National Bank of the Kingdom of Serbs, Croats and Slovenes
- Headquarters: Belgrade, Serbia
- Key people: Aleksa Spasić first governor
- Owner: Government of Serbia

The Privileged National Bank of the Kingdom of Serbia (Serbian: Привилегована народна банка Краљевине Србије, romanized: Privilegovana narodna banka Kraljevine Srbije) was the central bank of the Kingdom of Serbia, established in 1884 two years after the kingdom's proclamation. In 1920 it was merged to form the National Bank of the Kingdom of Serbs, Croats and Slovenes.

== Background ==
As elsewhere in Balkan Peninsula, and more than any other region of Europe in the 19th century, the Principality of Serbia was affected by circulation of a considerable variety of foreign money. The government maintained a so-called exchange-rate list which, as late as 1866, listed no fewer than 47 different types of coin in which taxes could be paid. In 1854, the newspaper Novine srbske published an article entitled "The current monetary crisis", which called for the creation of a new financial institution intended to put order in the affairs of the country. Given the principality's other difficulties, however, that call remained unheeded for three more decades.

== History ==
The National Bank of the Kingdom of Serbia was created by law of King Milan I on 18 January 1883, as a sui generis establishment with a privileged charter that also granted the State the right to oversee its operations, including the right for the government's representative in the bank's management to veto any decision of the bank. It was ostensibly modeled after the National Bank of Belgium, considered at the time to be at the forefront of modern banking institutions, which provided substantial technical assistance to Serbia for the creation of the National Bank.

Even after the bank's formal establishment by law, its ownership structure was still debated, between some who advocated recourse to foreign capital (as at the Imperial Ottoman Bank) given the scarcity of domestic resources, and others who doubted foreign shareholders would be sufficiently aligned with national interests. This point was resolved at a conference in May 1883 attended by Serbian merchants and business leaders, which resolved that they would provide the capital at the exclusion of foreigners. The first general assembly of the new institution took place from 26 to February 29, 1884. The first governor of the bank was Aleksa Spasić, appointed in March 1884. The bank subsequently started operations on July 14, 1884.

Originally it was located at 38 Knez Mihailova Street, at the corner of Dubrovačka Street (today Kralja Petra Street). In 1890 it moved to a larger building on Knez Mihailova Street, which remains known as the National Bank Building.

Following the Balkan Wars, the National Bank opened branch offices in Skopje and Bitola in December 1913. In late 1915 during the disruption of World War I, it was able to move much of its assets to Marseille. The National Bank under governor Đorđe Vajfert returned to Belgrade in December 1918. On 26 January 1920, the Law on the National Bank of the Kingdom of Serbs, Croats and Slovenes changed its name to the National Bank of the Kingdom of Serbs, Croats and Slovenes and extended its activity to the whole territory of the newly formed country.

== Governors ==
- Aleksa Spasić (March – October 1884)
- Filip Hristić (1885–1890)
- Đorđe Vajfert (1890–1902 and 1912–1920)
- Tihomilj J. Marković (1902–1912)
