= Bogoev =

Bogoev is a surname. Notable people with the surname include:

- Eftim Bogoev (born 1980), Macedonian basketball player
- Ksente Bogoev (1919–2008), Yugoslav economist, professor, and politician
