= Main Post Office Palace, Belgrade =

Main Post Office Palace
- Палата Главне поште
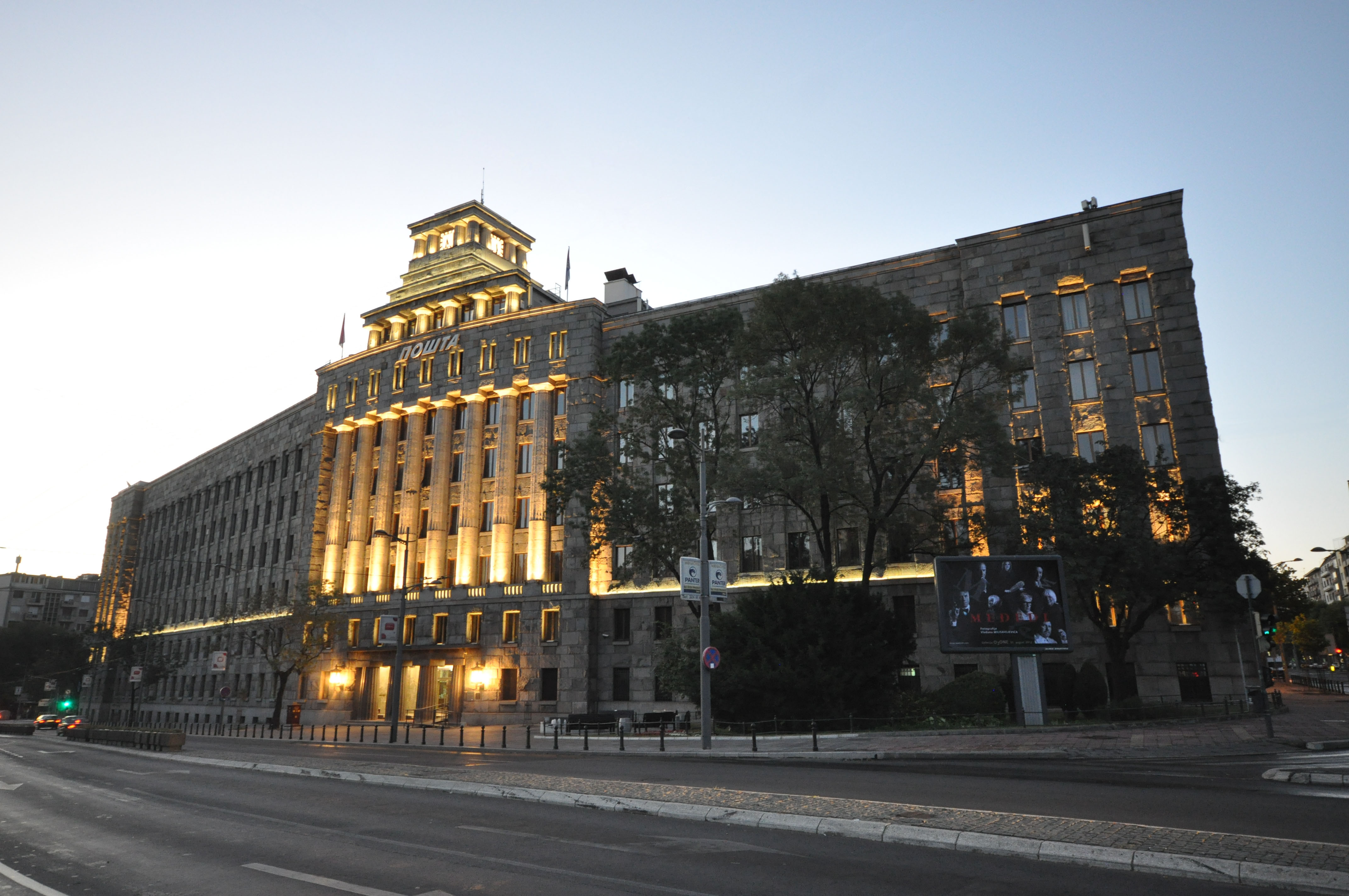

General information
- Type: Office building
- Location: Palilula, 2 Takovska Street, Belgrade, Serbia
- Coordinates: 44.8106°N 20.4674°E
- Opened: 1938

The Main Post Office Palace (Serbian: Палата Главне поште, romanized: Palata Glavne pošte) is a historic office building, serving as the headquarters of Pošta Srbije, national postal service of Serbia. It is located in Palilula, Belgrade, with the House of the National Assembly across Takovska Street.

== History ==
The Main Post Office, whose history of service dates back to the 1840s, was the national postal institution not only in Serbia but in the whole of the Kingdom of Serbs, Croats and Slovenes, later the Kingdom of Yugoslavia. On the other hand, the Post Office Savings Bank began operations in 1923 at the Hotel Moskva at Terazije Street. Although a young institution, the Post Office Savings Bank became one of the "most popular financial institutions" in the whole country after a few years of operation, so the rooms of the Hotel Moskva became too small. The authorities solved the question of inadequate accommodation of both institutions with the construction of a single building for the Main Post Office and the Post Office Savings Bank.

Despite all the activities related to the construction of buildings intended for postal services, the Main Post Office Palace was not constructed until the beginning of the 1930s. An all-Yugoslav competition for the project of the "Palace of the Post Office Savings Bank and the Main Post Office and Telegraph" was announced in 1930. From a total of fifteen of submitted works, three papers and four purchases were selected and awarded. First prize was awarded to the joint project of Zagreb-based architects Josip Pičman and Andrija Baranji, designed according to the principles of modern architecture, while the second prize was awarded to the also modern project of Slovenian architect Aco Lovrenčić. However, the realization of the winning project was soon abandoned. The beginning of the 1930s was marked by the European-wide economic crisis, while the second reason lay in the discontent of the highest state authorities by the selected project of architect Pičman, which in their opinion did not satisfy the requirements for representative and monumental architecture of public buildings. The reduction and ease of the facade canvas of Pičman's project did not fit the dominant architectural concept, which included the architecture of public buildings expressing the power, prosperity and statehood of the young Kingdom of Yugoslavia through its gorgeous, academically shaped facades. Immediately after the competition, it was decided that the Ministry of Construction amend the winning project. Elaboration of the sketches was entrusted to the architect Dimitrije M. Leko, and within the ministry, a narrower internal competition was organized to create new plans for the façades of the building, where the project of the architect Vasilije Androsov was evaluated as the best one. However, after the adoption of the new project of architect Androsov, the construction of the building did not start until another almost five years. Having approved the construction in 1934, the ceremony of consecration of the foundation stone took place on 17 August 1935. The work on the realization of this very important facility for the then Belgrade environment lasted three years and ended on 10 October 1938.

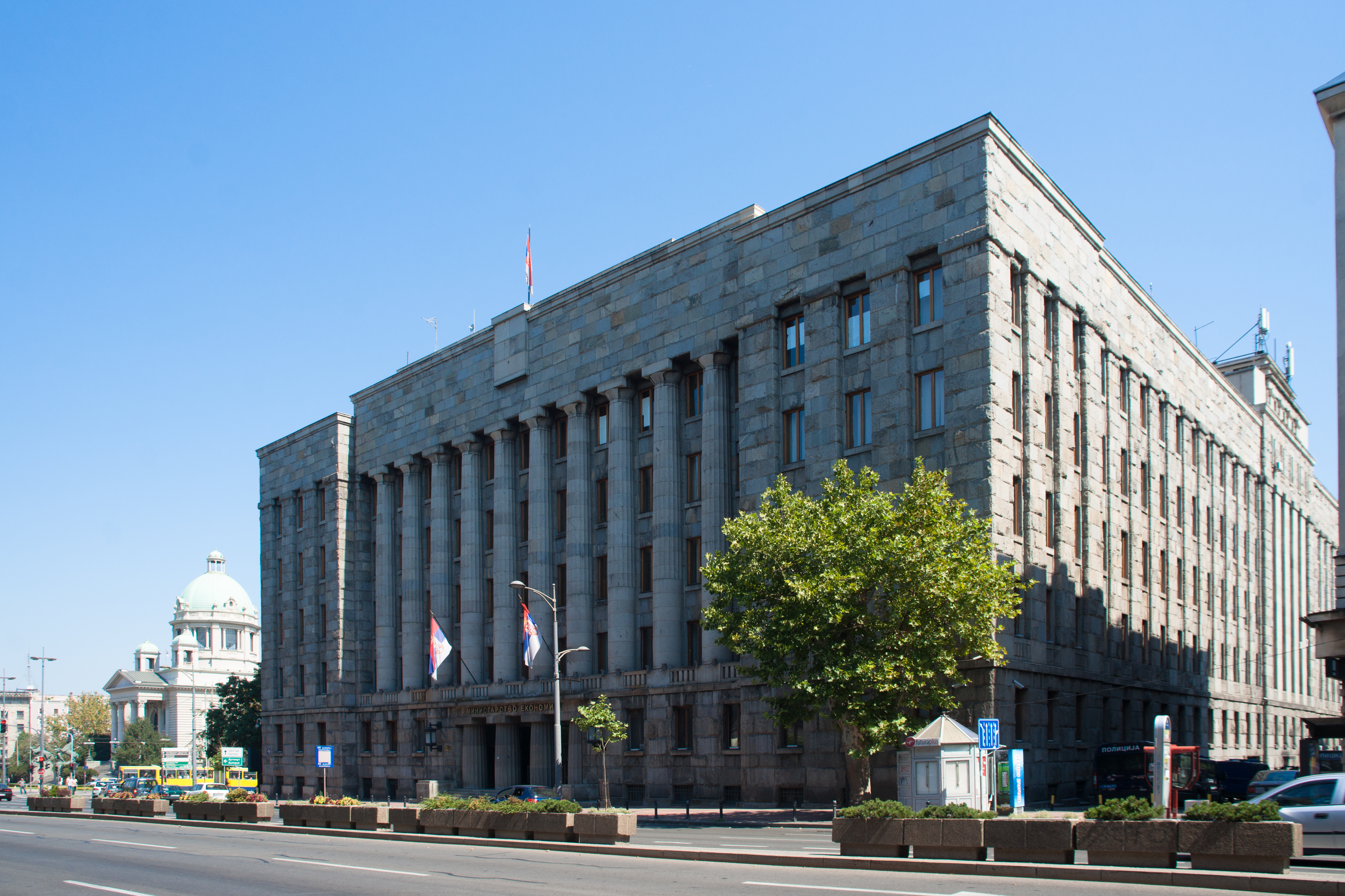
Part of the building facing Bulevar kralja Aleksandra, seat of the Constitutional Court

Since the completion of the building, the part of the palace facing Takovska Street designed for the work of the Main Post Office has not changed its basic purpose, successively housing headquarters of the national postal services of Yugoslavia, and now Serbia. On the other hand, the part of the palace facing Bulevar kralja Aleksandra saw various tenants. The Postal Savings Bank of Yugoslavia was located in that part of the building from 1946 to 1981, then it was used by the National Bank of Serbia within the System of National Banks, followed by the National Bank of Yugoslavia in Serbia and Montenegro from 2003 to 2006. From 2003 to 2013 the Ministry of Economy was also located there. Since 2013 it has been the seat of the Constitutional Court.

The Main Post Office Palace was declared a cultural monument in 2013.

== Architecture ==
Architecture of the Palace of the Post Office Savings Bank, Main Post Office and Main Telegraph in Belgrade reflects the complexity of the social, political, stylistic and aesthetic circumstances that ruled the entire artistic creativity of the interwar period. It is based on a combination of modernist and functional base and representatively molded facades in the academic style. New Androsov's project largely relied on the initial competition solution, which is primarily reflected in the decision of the base and disposition of space. Relations of mass, the position of the building in relation to the street, contours of the asymmetrically resolved basis, as well as the city and entrance number were retained from the original project to detail. All facades of the freestanding palace were recomposed according to the principles of academic monumental architecture, typical of the architecture of Belgrade of the fourth decade, while instead of the rather simple facades with combined glass and concrete, the author predicted cladding with granite slabs and artificial stone. The highlighted avant-corps of the main facade, except that it shares the façade canvas into two unequal, asymmetrical parts, also reflects the internal functional division of the object. The avant-corps is treated as a façade and outlined by the main portal in the ground-floor, elongated by Doric columns in the zone from the second to the fifth floor and a characteristic tower with a clock in the highest zone. Adjusting the modern concept of building to visually expressing the strength and prosperity of the new Yugoslav state and Belgrade as its capital with a representative academic base of its expression reflected the widely accepted attitude of the government with the monumental character of public buildings, designed in the style of high-academicism. As the building of the central and the most important postal institution in the Kingdom of Yugoslavia, the Palace of the Main Post Office is an important testimony to the development of postal services and activities, from its founding to the present. On the other hand, its striking position at the crossroads of two important city roads, is one of the most important visual benchmarks of the city center. At the same time, the monumentality of the continent and the representativeness of the external processing classify it among the major examples of academic architecture of Belgrade.

== See also ==
- List of buildings in Belgrade

== Literature ==
- Drljević, Marija (2009). Istorija i arhitektura Pošte 1 u Beogradu. Novi Sad: ZLUMS 37. pp. 277–296.
