= System of National Banks (Yugoslavia) =

Monetary framework in former Yugoslavia

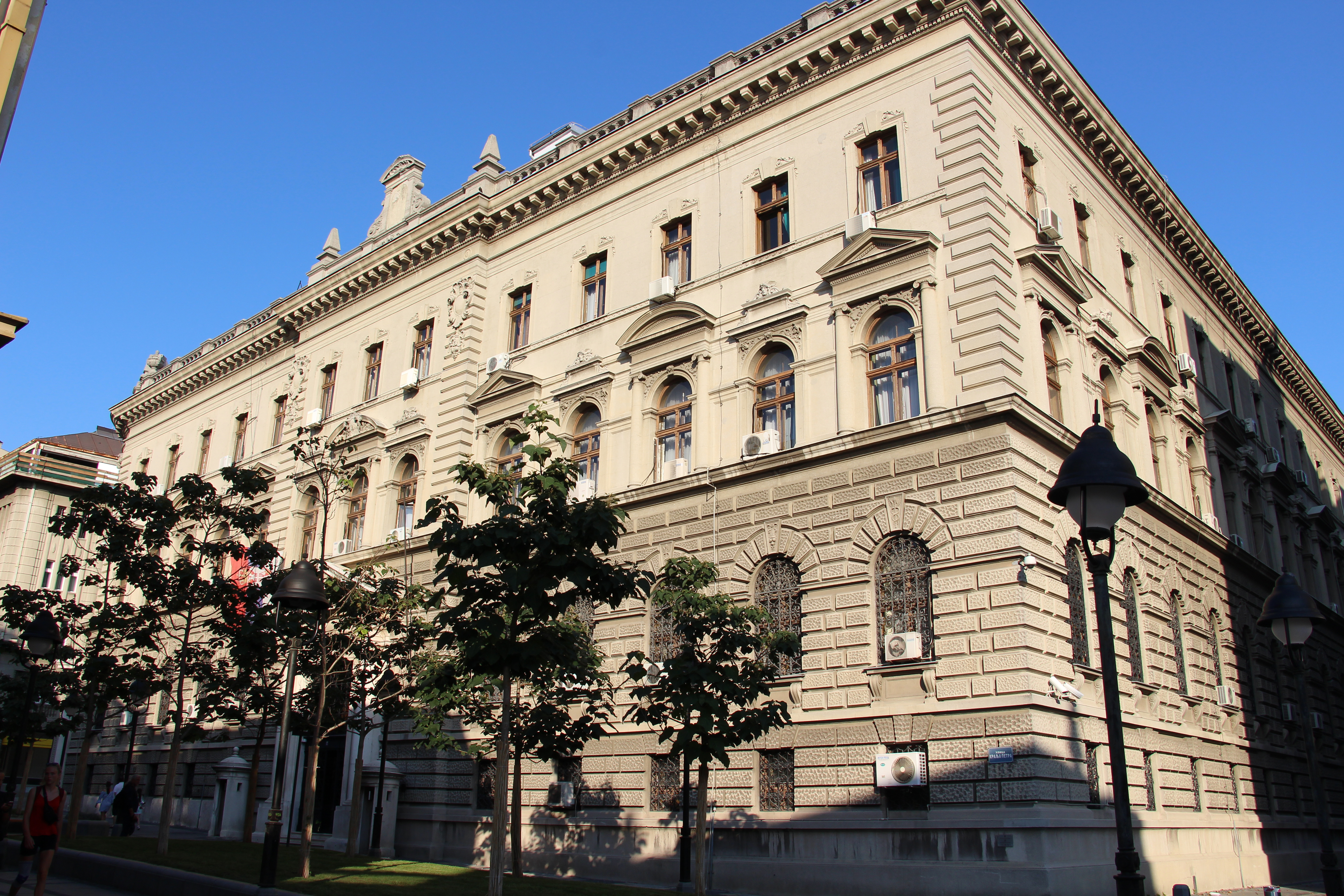
National Bank Building, Belgrade, seat of the NBJ during the time of the System of National Banks

The System of National Banks (Serbo-Croatian: sustav narodnih banaka) was a decentralized framework for monetary and financial policies of Yugoslavia from the early 1970s to 1993, involving the National Bank of Yugoslavia (NBJ) together with the eight central banks of the respective six constituent republics and two autonomous provinces of the Socialist Federal Republic of Yugoslavia. Each of the nine participant banks had a degree of policy autonomy, making the system more decentralized than the later Eurosystem, with which the System of National Banks shared some features.

The System of National Banks was prone to hyperinflation and eventually collapsed in 1990. With the breakup of Yugoslavia in 1991-1992, four of the National Banks became fully independent central banks of their respective newly independent countries, namely Bosnia and Herzegovina, Croatia, Macedonia, and Slovenia. The five remaining entities of the System, including the National Bank of Yugoslavia were consolidated in 1993 into a unitary entity of the same name in the Federal Republic of Yugoslavia.

== Overview ==
The System of National Banks was established as part of the decentralizing policies pioneered by Josip Broz Tito starting in the 1960s. The National Bank of Bosnia and Herzegovina, National Bank of Croatia, National Bank of Macedonia, National Bank of Montenegro, National Bank of Serbia, and National Bank of Slovenia were all established in 1971 and organized by subsequent legislation; the National Bank of Kosovo and National Bank of Vojvodina were established a year later, in 1972. The individual National Banks were accountable solely to the parliaments of the respective Republics and Autonomous Provinces.

The respective National Bank governors were ex officio members of the Board of Governors of the National Bank of Yugoslavia. Until 1986, decisions of the Board were made by consensus; in late 1986, that rule was replaced with two-thirds majority decision-making.

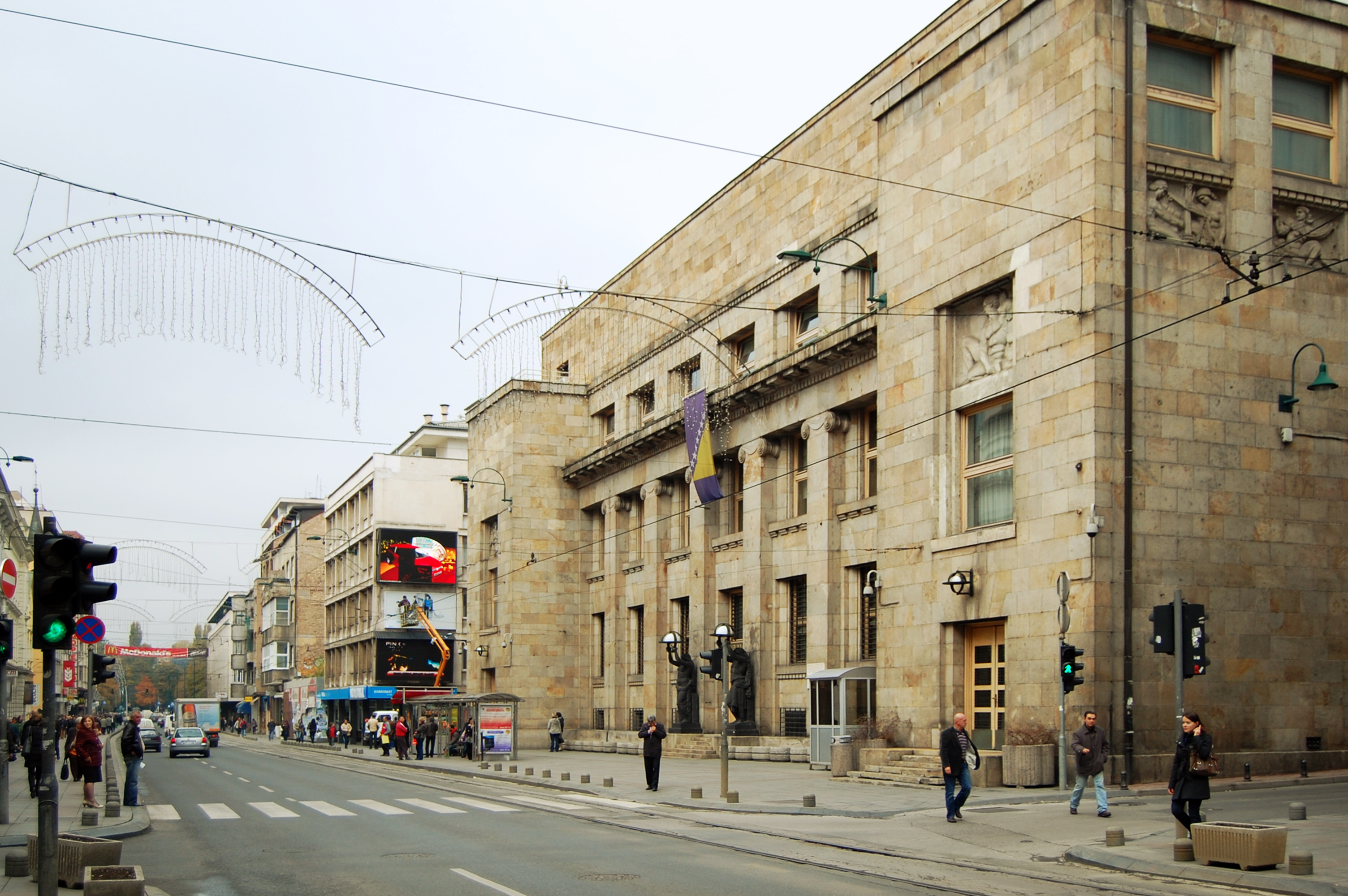
Former seat of the National Bank of Bosnia and Herzegovina, Sarajevo, later Central Bank of Bosnia and Herzegovina

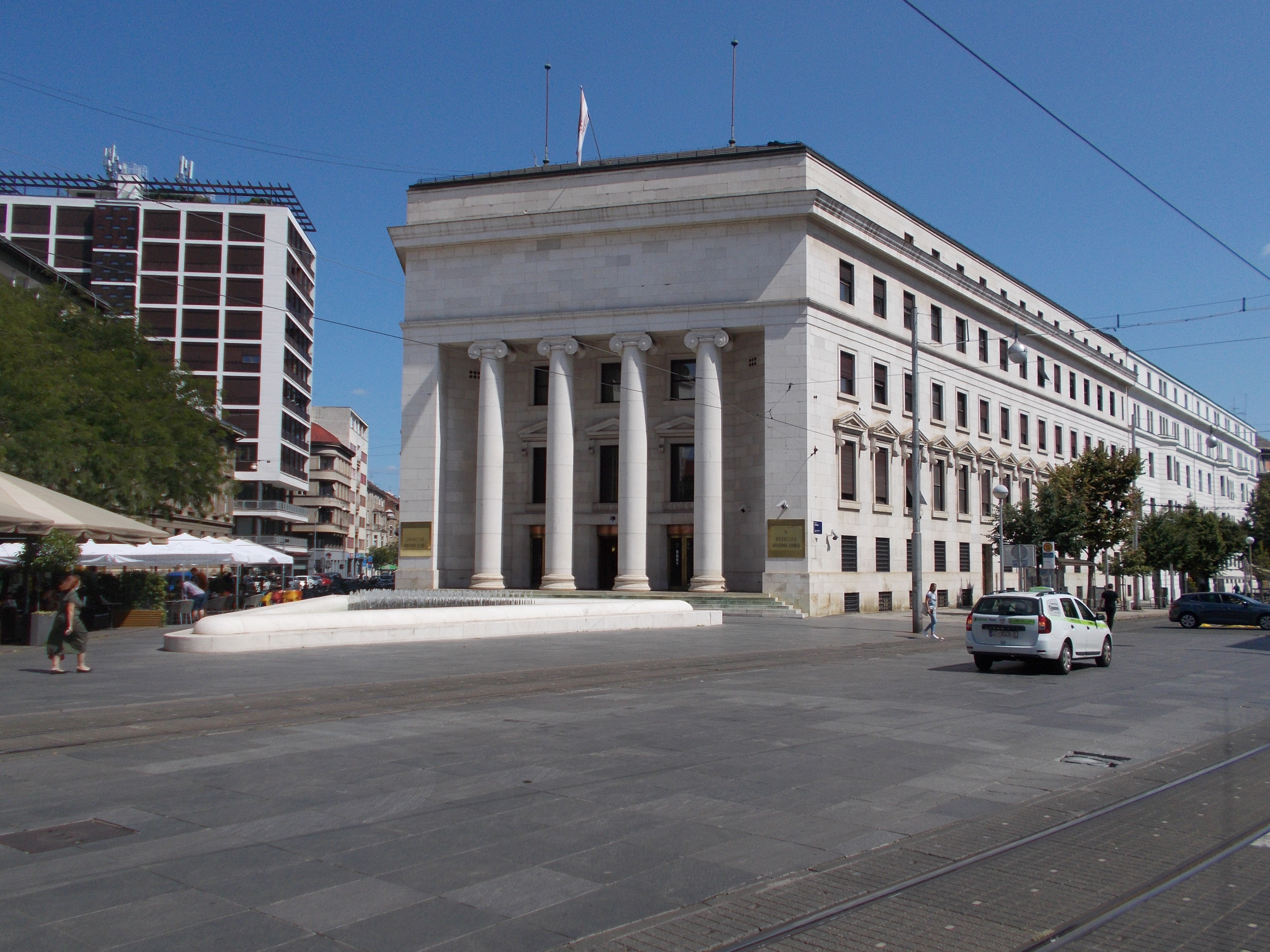
Former seat of the National Bank of Croatia, Zagreb, later Croatian National Bank

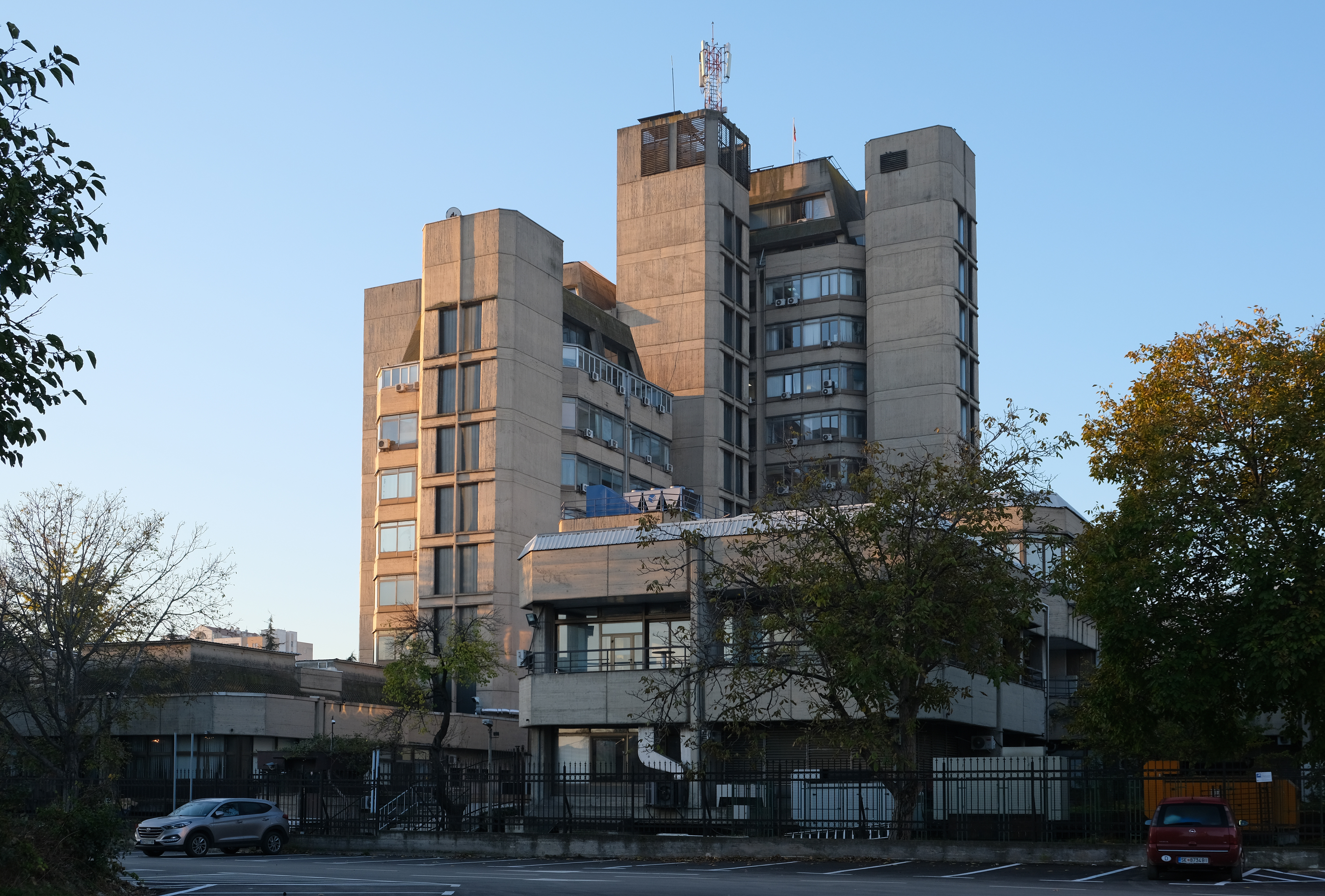
Former seat of the National Bank of Macedonia, Skopje, later National Bank of North Macedonia

Former seat of the National Bank of Montenegro, Podgorica, later Central Bank of Montenegro

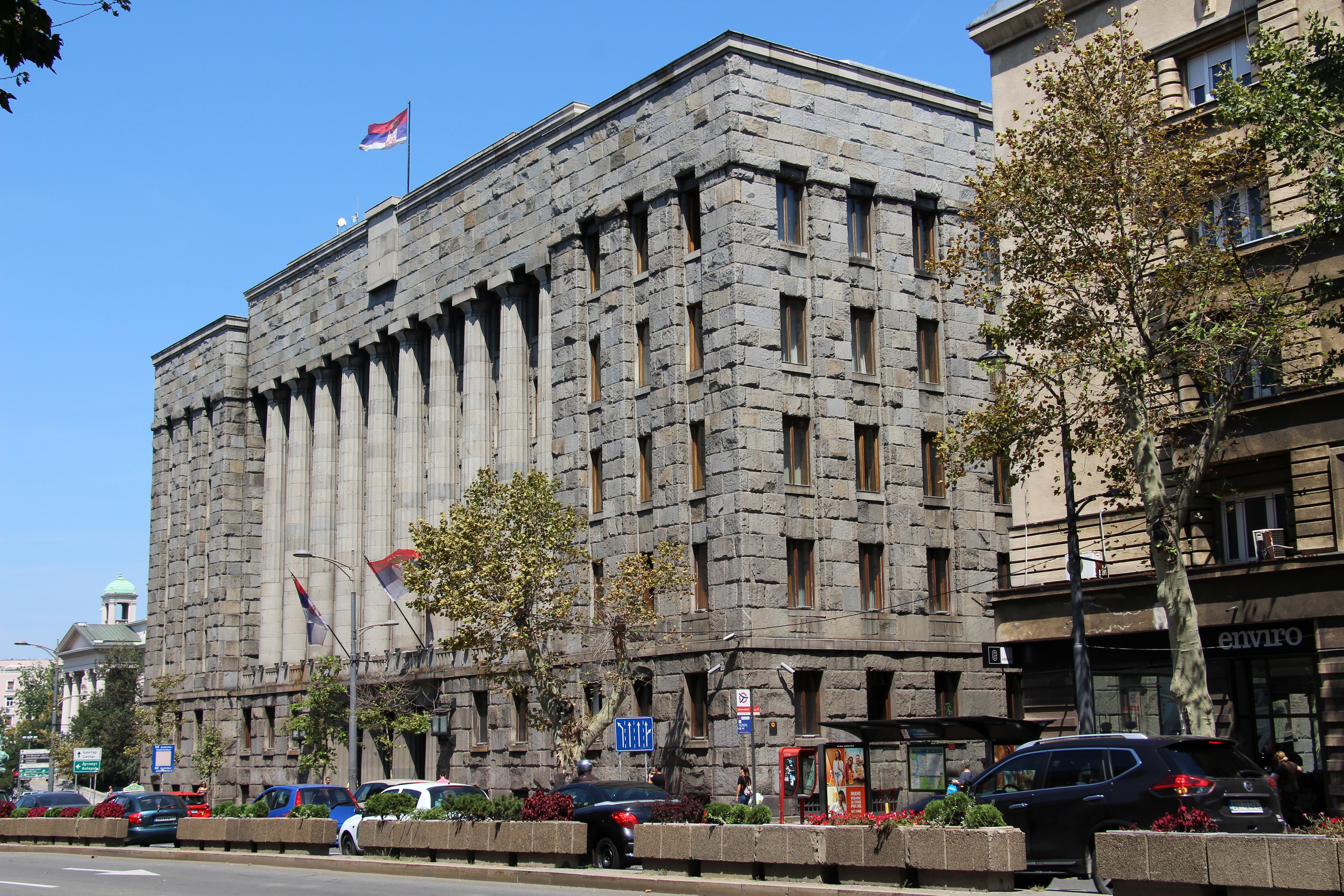
Former seat of the National Bank of Serbia, Belgrade, later Constitutional Court of Serbia

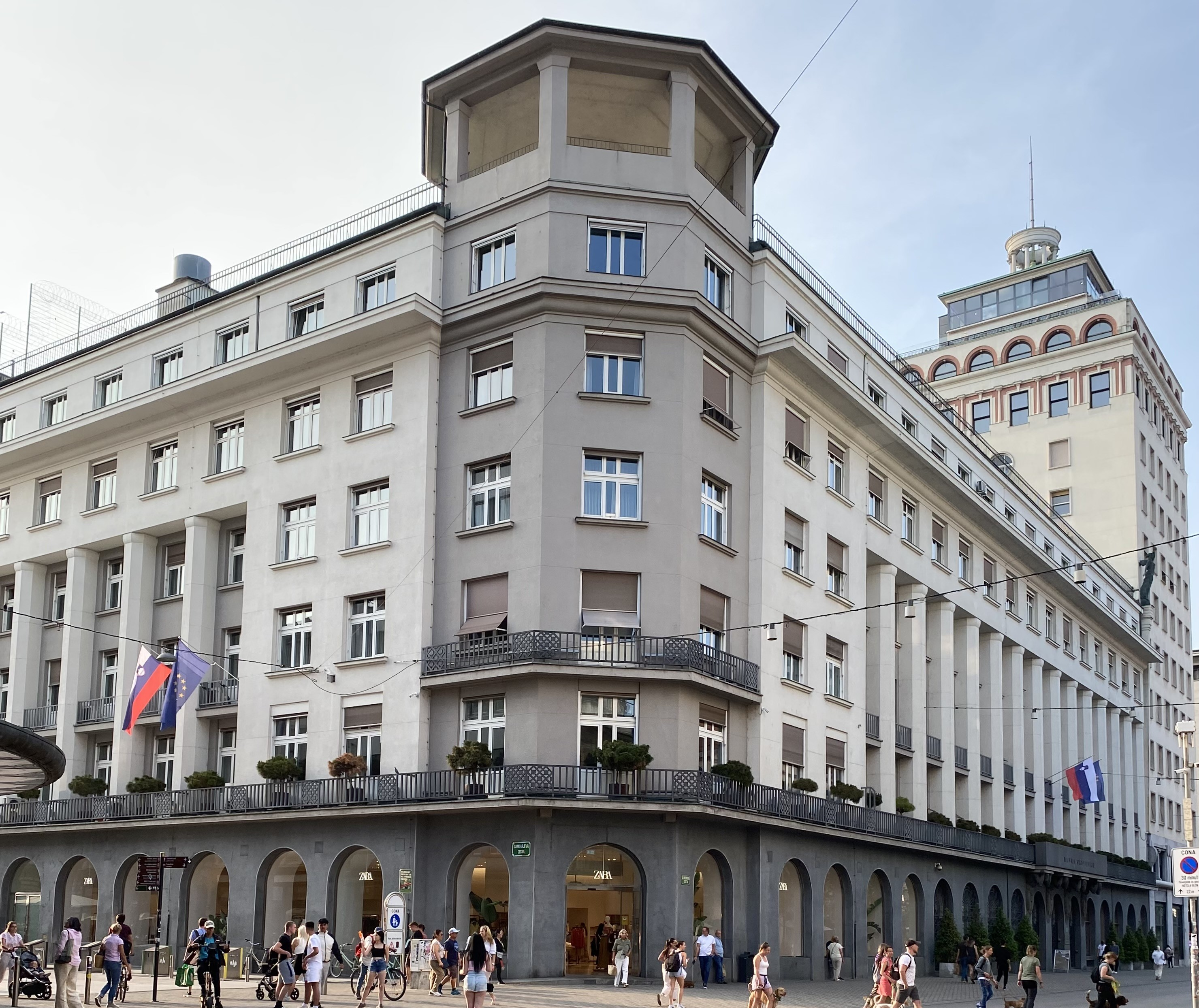
Former seat of the National Bank of Slovenia, Ljubljana, later Bank of Slovenia

== Collapse ==
The System collapsed because individual National Banks were able to issue currency and made payments without system-wide coordination, and its governance through the Board of Governors was ineffective in resolving conflicts among them. The imbalance between the autonomous National Banks and the impotent NBJ was exacerbated in 1983 when the latter was made the guarantor of all of Yugoslavia's foreign liabilities. The degradation of the system culminated in December 1990 with Serbia's unilateral raid on the monetary system.

== Aftermath ==
With the breakup of Yugoslavia and in the context of the Yugoslav Wars, four of the National Banks were transformed into fully-fledged national central banks by the respective successor countries:

- In Croatia, the National Bank of Croatia was designated as central bank by the Constitution of Croatia on 21 December 1990. The Croatian National Bank was then established under Croatian Law by Government Regulation of 23 December 1991, a provisional act made permanent by legislation of November 1992. The National Bank issued the Croatian dinar until 1994, then the Croatian kuna.
- In Slovenia, the National Bank of Slovenia was renamed the Bank of Slovenia by legislation entered into force on 25 June 1991, the same day as Slovenia's declaration of independence which triggered the Ten-Day War; the Slovenian tolar was subsequently introduced as national currency on 7 October 1991.
- In Bosnia and Herzegovina, the 1992 Bosnian independence referendum led to the country's independence on 1 March 1992, upon which the National Bank became the new country's central bank, issuing the Bosnia and Herzegovina dinar.
- In the Republic of Macedonia, the National Bank became the country's central bank in 1992. The Macedonian denar was first adopted as temporary currency on 26 April 1992.

In 1993, the National Banks of Kosovo, Montenegro, Vojvodina, and Serbia lost their independent legal identity to become mere branches of the NBJ.

On 2 November 1999, Montenegro designated the Deutsche Mark (by then already defined in terms of the euro) as official currency alongside the Yugoslav dinar. On 13 November 2000, Montenegro announced it would drop the dinar altogether and adopted the Deutsche Mark as its only currency, effective January 2001. The Central Bank of Montenegro was established by the Law on the Central Bank in November 2000 and began operations on 15 March 2001, steering the country's monetary and financial policy even though it is not itself involved in money creation.

Also in November 1999, the Banking and Payments Authority of Kosovo (BPK) was established by the Special Representative of the Secretary-General for Kosovo, in the immediate aftermath of the Kosovo War. In 2006, the Special Representative enacted a new Regulation transforming the BPK into the Central Banking Authority of Kosovo (AQBK). The Central Bank of the Republic of Kosovo was then founded in June 2008, the same year Kosovo declared its independence from Serbia, under Law No. 03/L-074 enacted by the Assembly of the Republic of Kosovo.

== See also ==
- List of banks in Yugoslavia
- Eurosystem
