= National Bank Building, Belgrade =

Historic building in Belgrade, Serbia

National Bank Building
- Зграда Народне банке
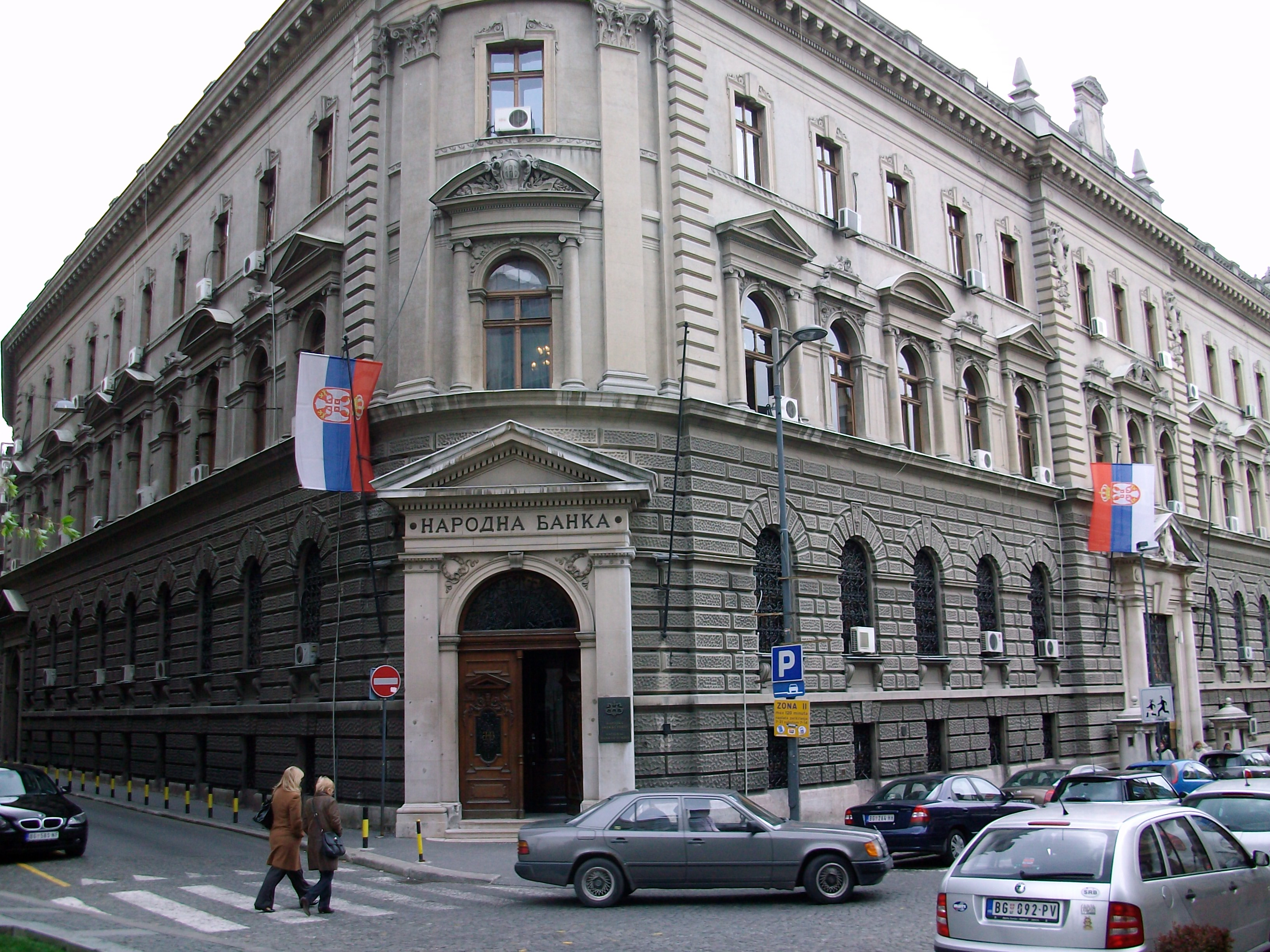
- View from outside

- Location within Belgrade

General information
- Location: Belgrade, Serbia
- Coordinates: 44°49′07″N 20°27′14″E
- Construction started: 1889
- Completed: 1890
- Opened: 15 March 1890; 136 years ago

The National Bank building in Belgrade (Serbian: Зграда Народне банке у Београду, romanized: Zgrada Narodne Banke u Beogradu) is a historically significant building located in Belgrade, Serbia, at 12 King Petar St. As of 2023, it hosted a visitor center of the National Bank of Serbia.

== The establishment of the National Bank ==
The establishment of the Privileged National Bank of the Kingdom of Serbia was a long process consequent on the development of the economy, currency and other financial institutions, as well as the needs of economic and political emancipation of the Kingdom of Serbia. The bank was formally launched after the adoption of the Law on the National Bank, 12 December 1882, which was confirmed by king Milan Obrenović on 6 January 1883. Under this law, the bank was established as a privileged institution (for the next 25 years in the form of a joint stock company), with an initial capital of 20 million dinars, and it was envisaged that its activities would be conducted under the control of the state. Officially, the bank began operations on 1 June 1884. On that date, the bank leased space taken in Knez Mihajlo no. 38 (now No. 50), at the house of Hristina Kumanudi.

== Construction of the building ==
As its temporary accommodation was inadequate, land was purchased for the construction of a new building in 1886 on the corner of Dubrovacka and Prince Lazar streets.

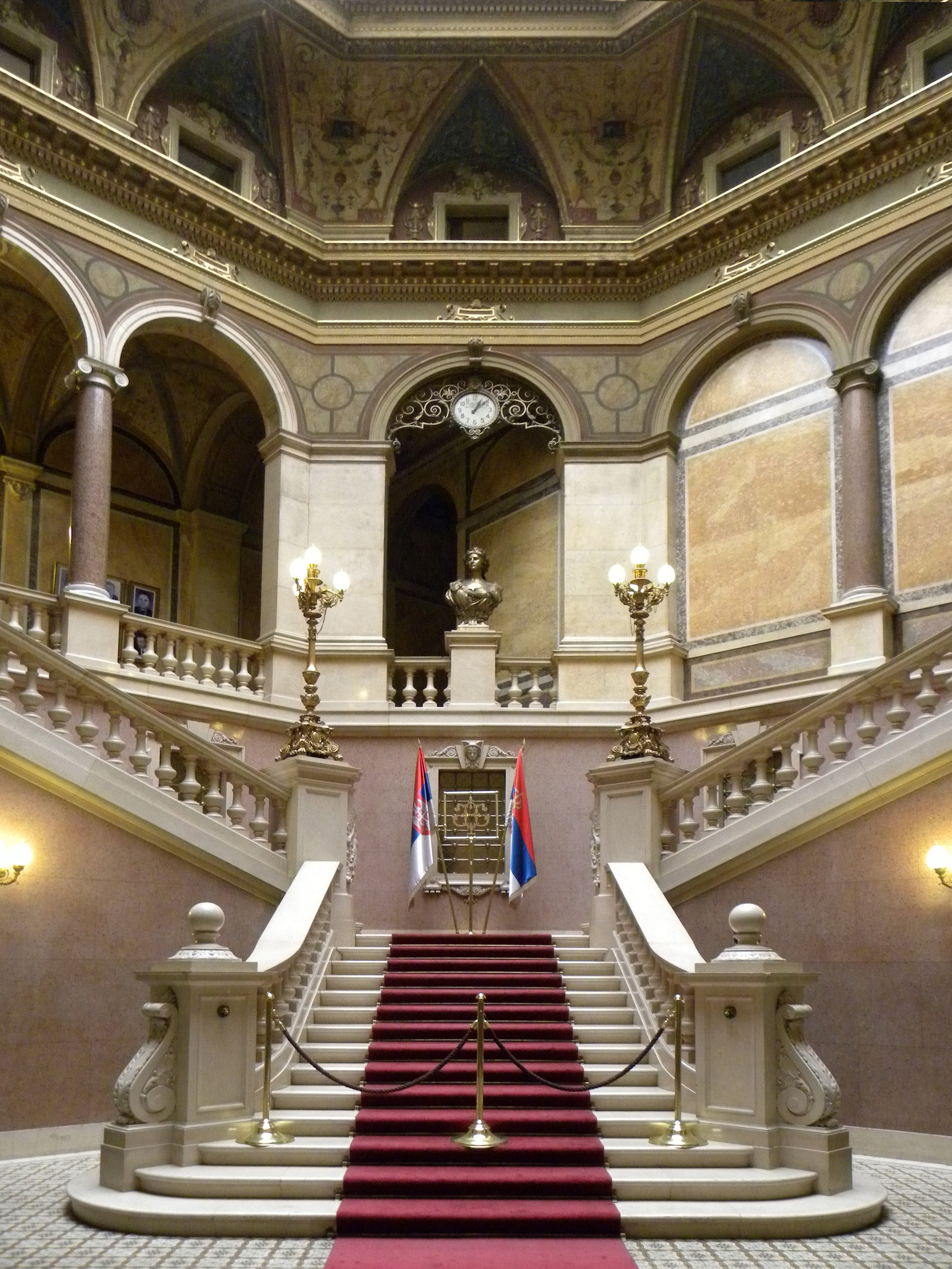
Interior, vestibule of the older part of the building

In 1887, a draft plan for the new building was adopted, drawn up by two architects employed in the Ministry of Construction. However, the Board of Directors decided to assign project development to Konstantin Jovanović, then already affirmed architect, and son of a lithographer Anastas Jovanović. The bank project was also his first job in Belgrade. Construction of the building was entrusted to contractors Jirasek and Kraus from Szeged. The work lasted from 1889 until its official completion on 15 March 1890. The importance of the new building was reflected in the award to Konstantin A. Jovanović in 1890 of the Order of St. Sava, class III. The bank's report for 1890 said: "...the Bank has a house of which she can be proud of, as can our capital, which she serves to ornament". Great credit goes to architect Kosta Jovanović who developed the plans and under whose supervision the building was constructed.

After World War I, the Privileged National Bank of the Kingdom of Serbia became the National Bank of the Kingdom of Serbs, Croats and Slovenes. Between 1922 and 1925, the bank building was extended to cater for its space requirements, to fill the entire area of the city block, in the form of an irregular pentagon. Jovanović again carried out the extension, in a style consistent with the older part of the building. It is a closed block with an internal atrium courtyard, and has been preserved to date. Jovanović modelled the building stylistically on the architecture of late-Renaissance palaces of 16th-century Italy. It also appears to be influenced by Jovanović' professor and prominent Viennese architect Gottfried Semper.

== Architecture ==
Jovanović's immediate models were Palazzo Farnese in Rome, designed by Antonio da Sangallo the Younger and Michelangelo (1513, and 1534–46), and Semper's mid-19th-century Oppenheim Palace in Dresden.

The bank building exemplifies a characteristic feature of Jovanović's architectural design: variation on a Renaissance façade theme combined with an eclectic approach that incorporates elements of Baroque architectural decoration. It is considered one of the notable works of academism in Serbian architecture.

=== Exterior design ===
The elevations show a tripartite horizontal division typical of academism. The zones are clearly defined by the contrast between the rusticated lower and calmer upper zones, separated by a prominent stringcourse. The heavy and monolithic rustication of the basement and ground-floor zone, tempered by the regular rhythm of arch-headed windows, is a clear reference to the Florentine 15th-century palazzo. The monotony of the ground floor is broken by formal entrances facing Kralja Petra and Cara Lazara streets. The upper zones display less restraint. The strict hierarchy of the first-floor composition pattern is given a more dynamic edge by alternating differently topped windows and accentuating the imposing windows above the entrances. The second-floor zone, simplified by a row of less ornate window openings, is surmounted by a protruding cornice and a balustraded parapet.

=== Interior design ===
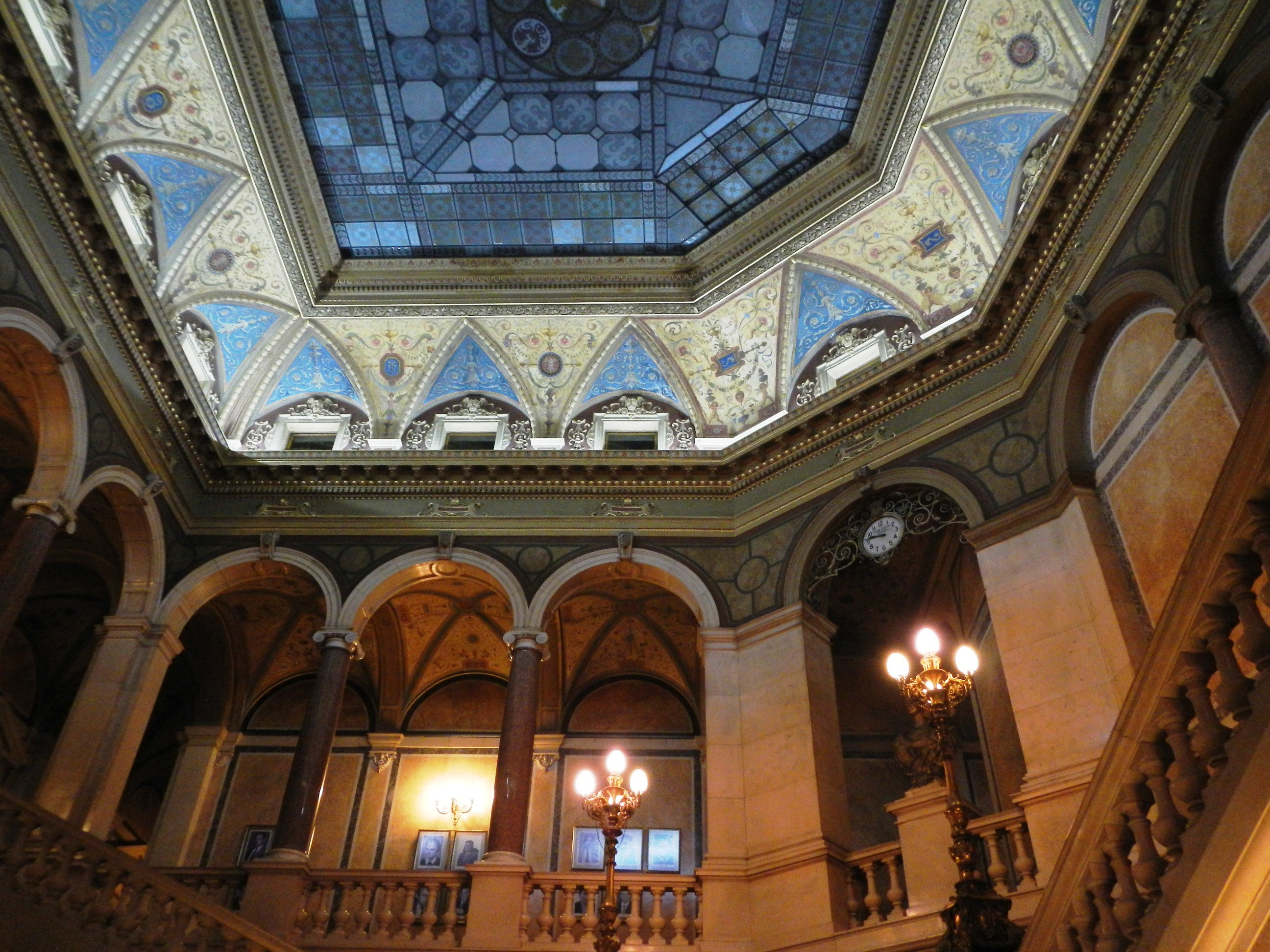
Interior design of the building

The artistically rich design of interior spaces includes a large number of functional and decorative arts and crafts objects, which form an integral part of the architecture of the building. Particular emphasis was placed on the design of functional nodes: the vestibule in the earlier part of the building and the counter hall in the later one. Being accessible to the public, these spaces were elaborately decorated in the neo-Renaissance style, with a composition pattern based on contrasts between full and empty surfaces, and calm monochrome and vibrant polychrome details, on the generous use of floral ornamentation, and on the alternation of different materials.

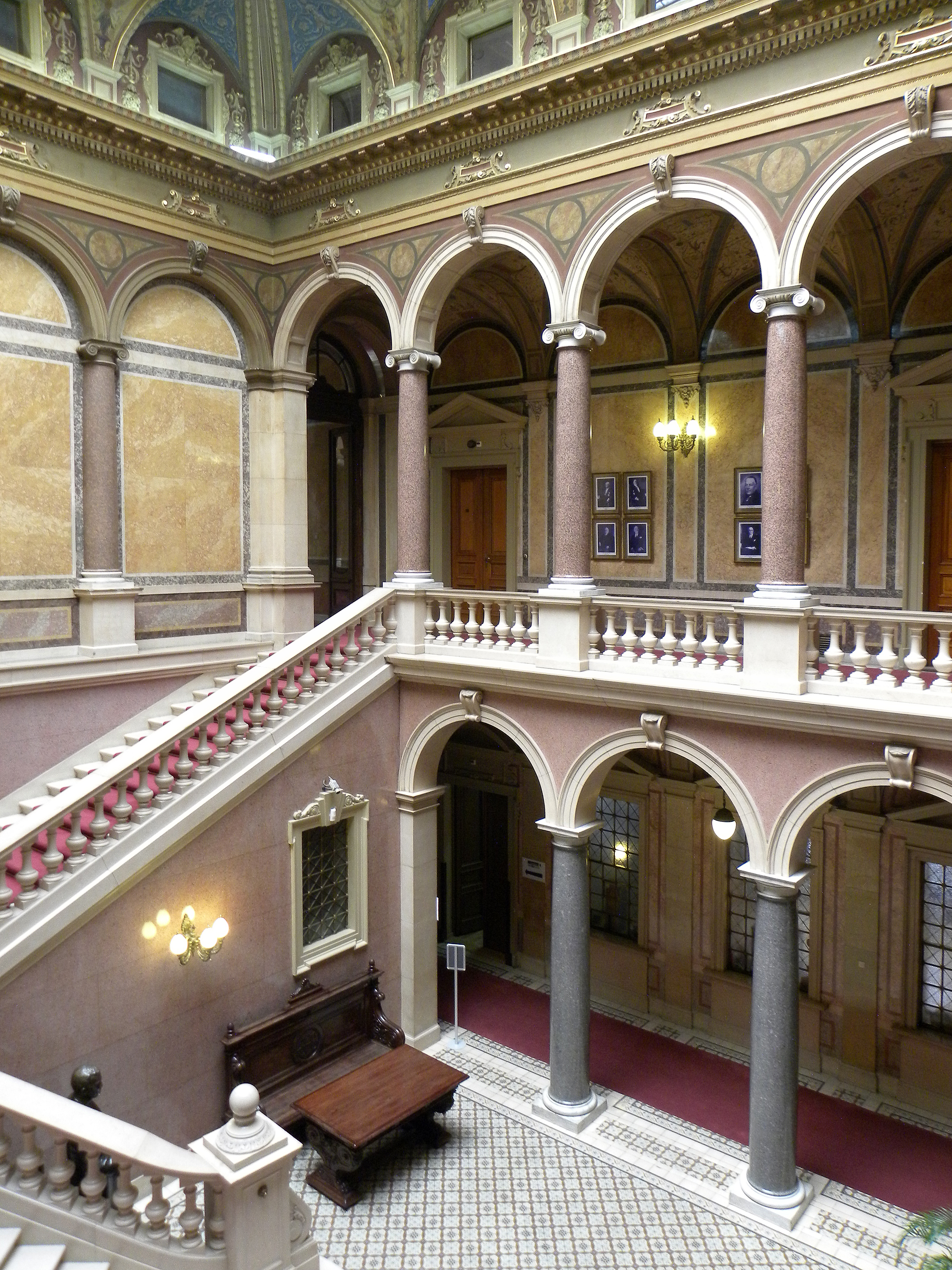
Interior design of the building

The general impression of luxury and monumentality of the interior is reinforced by an ensemble of decorative wall painting, one of the best preserved and most prestigious created in the early 20th century. It followed European trends of the time and was conceived as fully subordinate to architecture. This type of decorative painting is understandably devoid of the painter's personal touch and probably follows a pattern of central-European origin. The painted decoration of the part of the building constructed in 1925 shows the same pattern, iconography and style as the older part. Its iconography displays a compilation of motifs based on free quotation from various mythologies and artistic traditions. The symbolism of the decoration, through the motifs of cornucopias, sphinxes, gryphons and, the central one, Mercury, clearly refers to the function of the building, conveying the idea of success, affluence and prosperity. To be singled out in terms of artistic merit is the allegorical bust of Serbia, a work of the sculptor Đorđe Jovanović originally intended for the monument to the heroes of the Battle of Kosovo in Kruševac. Set up in the vestibule of the older part of the building, the bust underscores the national character of the establishment. Until the Second World War the interior was adorned with the portraits of all previous governors of the National Bank, oils on canvass painted by Uroš Predić.

The National Bank building is representative both of contemporary European trends in the style of academism, and of the work of Konstantin Jovanović, Serbia's connoisseur of academic architecture. The architect's distinctive interpretation and the institutional importance of the National Bank make this building a remarkable testament to the social aspirations and economic and architectural achievement of the Kingdom of Serbia and the Kingdom of Serbs, Croats and Slovenes. It was designated a heritage property of outstanding significance in 1979.

== See also ==
- National Bank of Serbia

== Literature ==
- Ljiljana Babić, “Život i rad arhitekte Konstantina A. Jovanovića” (general part), ZAF V-6 (1960);
- Ljiljana Babić, “Život i rad arhitekte Konstantina A. Jovanovića” (special part), ZAF VI-2 (1961);
- Ljubomir Nikić, “Iz arhitektonske delatnosti Konstantina Jovanovića u Beogradu”, GGB XXIII (1976), 127–130;
- Divna Djurić Zamolo, Graditelji Beograda 1815–1914 (Belgrade 1981), 55;
- Milan Šćekić, Konstantin Jovanović arhitekt, Catalogue of K. Jovanović's Legacy from the Belgrade City Museum collections (Belgrade 1988);
- Aleksandar Kadijević, Estetika arhitekture akademizma (XIX–XX vek) (Belgrade 2005), 314, 315, 354;
- Bojan Radovanović, 110 godina Narodne banke 1884–1994 (Belgrade 1994);
- Gordana Gordić, “Palata Narodne banke”, Nasledje II (1999), 85–94;
- Ivan Kleut, “Graditeljski opus Konstantina Jovanovića u Beogradu”, GGB LIII (2006), 214–249

CHPIB Documentation.
