= Ksente Bogoev =

Yugoslav Macedonian politician and economist (1919–2008)

- Ксенте Богоев (Macedonian)
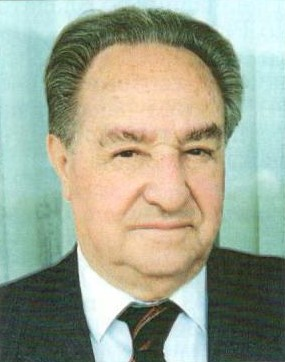
- Born: 20 October 1919; Leunovo, Kingdom of Yugoslavia
- Died: 20 April 2008 (aged 88); Skopje, North Macedonia

Ksente Bogoev (Macedonian: Ксенте Богоев; 20 October 1919 in Leunovo – 20 April 2008 in Skopje) was a prominent economist, professor and prime minister of the Socialist Republic of Macedonia within the former Yugoslavia and Governor of the National Bank of Yugoslavia in 1977. He was a member and chairman (1992–1997) of the Macedonian Academy of Sciences and Arts.
