= Đorđe Vajfert =

Serbian banker and industrialist (1850–1937)

Đorđe Vajfert Ђорђе Вајферт
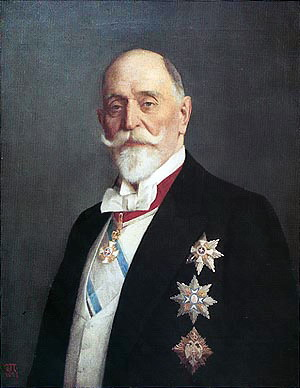
- Portrait by Uroš Predić, 1927

Governor of the National Bank of Serbia
- In office 1890–1902
- Preceded by: Filip Hristić
- Succeeded by: Tihomilj J. Marković

Governor of the National Bank of Serbia and Yugoslavia
- In office 1912–1926
- Preceded by: Tihomilj J. Marković
- Succeeded by: Ljubomir Srećković

Personal details
- Born: 15 June 1850 Pančevo, Austrian Empire
- Died: 12 January 1937 (aged 86) Belgrade, Kingdom of Yugoslavia
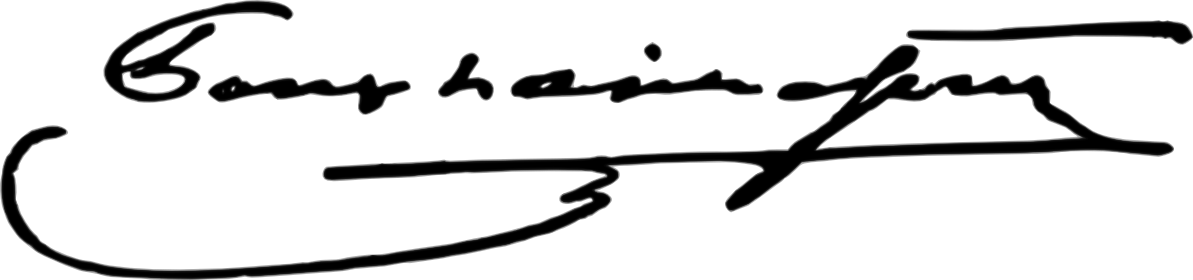
- Signature

Đorđe Vajfert (Serbian Cyrillic: Ђорђе Вајферт, German: Georg Weifert; 15 July 1850 – 12 January 1937) was a Serbian industrialist who served as the Governor of the National Bank of Serbia from 1890 to 1902, and again from 1912 to 1926, during which it became the National Bank of Yugoslavia in 1920. He is considered the founder of the modern mining sector in Serbia and a notable philanthropist.

== Biography ==
Vajfert was born to a Danube Swabian family in Pančevo, part of the German Banat. Vajfert's grandfather and father, Ignatz, purchased the Great Brewery in Belgrade in 1865 and turned it into one of the biggest in the Balkans.

From an early age, Vajfert also worked with his father in brewing. He graduated from the Braumeisterschule in Weihenstephan, near Munich. He then returned to Serbia and took over the brewery of his father, which he expanded. With the profits he bought a coal mine in Kostolac, then a copper mine in Bor, a Steinberg works at Zaječar and finally a gold mine. With the proceeds from the mines, he was the richest man in Serbia and was considered the greatest industrialist of the future Yugoslavia.

In 1890, Vajfert was appointed Governor of the National Bank of Serbia. He served in this capacity from 1890 to 1902, and again from 1912 to 1918. During this period he acquired a good reputation maintaining the value of the Serbian dinar and in credit. Because of his good offices, Vajfert was appointed Governor of the National Bank of Yugoslavia after its creation in 1920 and served in the role until 1926. His best-known arrangement as governor was the conversion of the Austro-Hungarian krone into the new Yugoslav dinar. This also led to great criticism, as the former Serbian dinar was exchanged 1:1 in the new dinar, the Austrian money into a 4:1 ratio – this led to substantial losses of property of those Yugoslavs who formerly lived in Austria-Hungary.

Vajfert was an important patron and supporter of humanitarian and cultural institutions. He donated his prized collection of ancient coins and his private library to the University of Belgrade. In his hometown of Pančevo, he left the Roman Catholic church a small chapel known as Anina crkva (Anna's church), in memory of his mother. Vajfert was also a major benefactor in the opening of a large Catholic cemetery in Pančevo where the remains of many family members of Vajfert remain. They also built up a fund for Pančevo St. Anne Catholic Church and many other public and charitable institutions.

Vajfert was awarded the Order of Saint Sava, Order of Karađorđe's Star and Order of the White Eagle.

Vajfert died on 12 January 1937, at 5:20 pm, at his villa in Belgrade. The funeral service was held in the Catholic Church of St. Anne Pancevo 14 January, and on the 15th he was buried in the Catholic cemetery in Pančevo. The heir to his business empire was his nephew Ferdinand Gramberg.

== Legacy ==
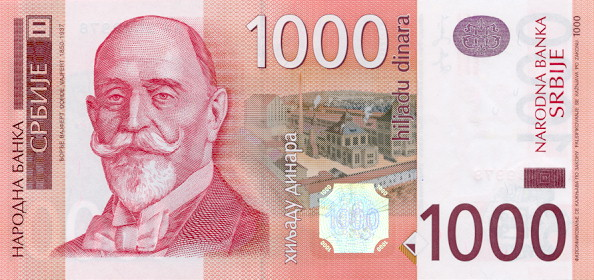
Weifert on the 1000 Serbian dinar bill

Vajfert has been depicted on the 1000 Serbian dinar note since 2001.

== See also ==
- Luka Ćelović
- Nikola Spasić
- Miša Anastasijević
- Stanojlo Petrović
- Marija Trandafil
- Sava Tekelija

== Sources ==
- Saša Ilić; Sonja Jerković; Vladimir Bulajić (2010). Georg Weifert – Visionary and Enthusiast: The Illustrated Personal and Professional Biography 1850–1937. National Bank of Serbia.

Government offices
| Preceded by Filip Hristić | Governor of the National Bank of Serbia; 1890–1902 | Succeeded by Tihomilj J. Marković |
| Preceded by Tihomilj J. Marković | Governor of the National Bank of Serbia; 1912–1918 | Succeeded by Himself, Yugoslavia created |
| Preceded by Himself | Governor of the National Bank of Yugoslavia; 1918–1926 | Succeeded by Ljubomir Srećković |
