= Vojin Đuričić =

Serbian economist (1888–1944)

- Војин Ђуричић
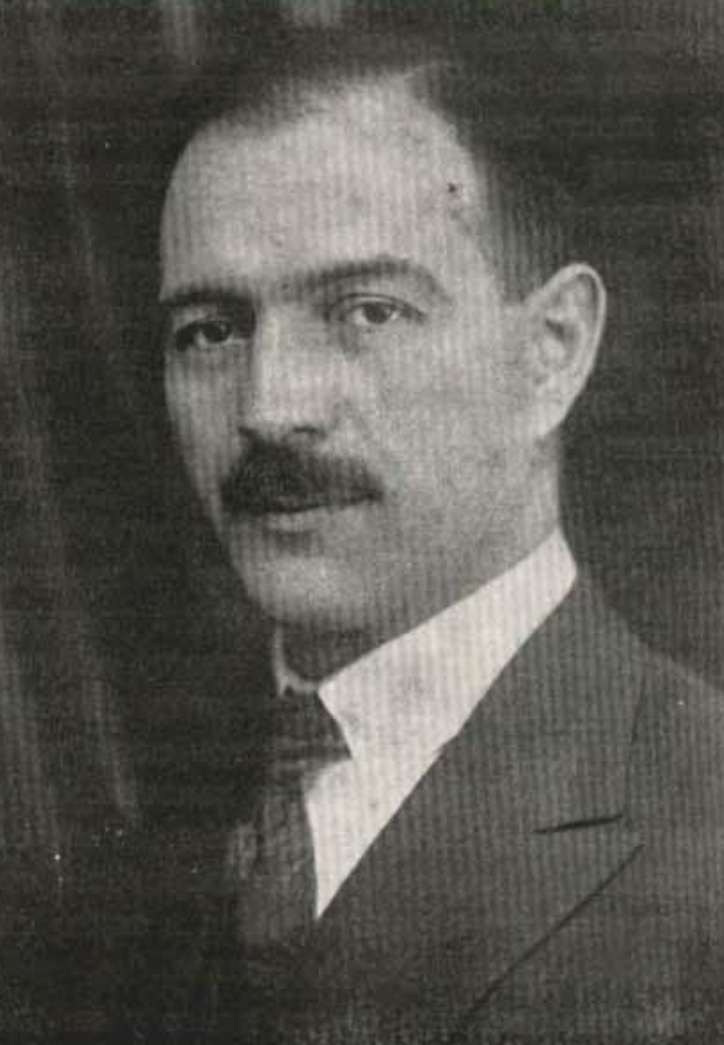

Minister of Finance
- In office 6 January 1939 – 26 August 1939
- Prime Minister: Dragiša Cvetković

Mayor of Belgrade
- In office September 1939 – April 1940

Personal details
- Born: 23 February 1888 Belgrade, Kingdom of Serbia
- Died: 29 July 1944 (aged 56) Belgrade, Kingdom of Yugoslavia
- Education: University of Montpellier
- Profession: Economist

Vojin Đuričić (Serbian Cyrillic: Војин Ђуричић; 23 February 1888 – 29 July 1944) was a Serbian economist who served as Yugoslav Minister of Finance between January and August 1939. After studying abroad, he spent 12 years as the director of the State Mortgage Bank, in addition to serving in high-ranking positions at several other companies. Between September 1939 and April 1940, he served as the mayor of Belgrade, where he was born. Additionally, he was involved in several cultural and social organisations, such as being the president of the Ruđer Bošković Astronomical Society and an aeroclub, and was involved in the publishing of a controversial monograph about Belgrade for its centennial. During his life, he received multiple honours and awards for his work from Yugoslavia, as well as from abroad.

== Early and personal life ==
He was born in Belgrade on 22 February 1888. His father was a teacher by the name of Milan Đuričić. According to astronomer Nenad Janković, his father taught Serbian, and after he was sent from the Second Men's Gymnasium in Belgrade to teach in Valjevo, Vojin went to an elementary school and gymnasium there. He graduated from a gymnasium in Niš, and then went on to study architecture and chemistry in France, though ultimately getting a degree in law in Montpellier in 1910. After spending a year in Prague, he received a doctorate in 1911, either in political economy or economic-financial law.

He was married to a Russian student he met while studying in France. He also officiated Vladimir Strzhizhevsky's wedding, and Đuričić would be moved to his house shortly before his death. According to Janković, he was also a great francophile, and maintained ties with France, receiving several honours from the country.

== Professional career ==
In 1912, Đuričić entered the ministry of finance, where he would work until 1927. Starting out as a clerk, he would take up the position of head of the budgetary division, head of the budgetary department, and then the director-general of the government debt and government credit departments. Starting April 1927, he worked as the manager of the State Mortgage Bank. This position he would hold until 1939.

He held high positions in a silo company, an export company and an agricultural bank, as well as heading Jugoslovenski čelik (Yugoslav Steel) starting in 1938. Between 6 January and 26 August 1939, he served as the finance minister in the second government of Dragiša Cvetković. In this role, he signed an agreement with Germany for a 200,000 Deutsche Mark loan for the purchase of weapons and aircraft in April 1939. He had previously also negotiated with the United Kingdom on Yugoslavia's war debt, as well as agreed on a £50 million loan from the Rothschild Group, though the latter ultimately fell through. In September 1939, he was chosen as the president of the Belgrade municipality, a position which he would hold until April 1940. During his tenure, public transport was expanded, more land was secured for widening roads, and the Belgrade Central Cemetery was opened. Đuričić retired on 26 June 1940, at the age of 52. After this, he was a board member of the Utva factory, which would be his last public engagement.

During Đuričić's life, he received several awards for his work, both from Yugoslavia and abroad. The former include an Order of St. Sava, First Class, an Order of the Yugoslav Crown, Second class, and an Order of the White Eagle, Fourth class. Additionally, he was awarded the Bulgarian Order of Civil Merit, First Class, as well as a Czechoslovak Order of the White Lion. He is also a member of the French Legion of Honour, and an honorary citizen of Lyon.

== Other activities ==
In his role as the director of the State Mortgage Bank, he approved a large loan to the Academic Astronomical Society for a new observatory, and following this, and considering his passion for astronomy, Đorđe Nikolić, the Society's first president, proposed Đuričić for an honorary member at the Society's founding assembly. He was selected to replace Nikolić as president in 1936, and would hold this position until 1941. During this period, he was chosen as an honorary professor of the Higher Economical School in Belgrade, now the University of Belgrade Faculty of Economics. He also wrote articles on finance and economics.

Đuričić took up roles in numerous other cultural and social institutions. He was the president of a committee for the erection of monuments for notable people from Valjevo and the surrounding areas, as well as a board member of the Nikola Tesla Institute, whose founding he participated in. Additionally, he participated in the work of the Balkan Institute. This he also funded, even advertising the State Mortgage Bank in the institute's newsletter.

Đuričić had a passion for aviation, gliding in particular, and led the Aeronautical Gliding Group "Deveti" (meaning "Ninth", a reference to the nine people required to launch a glider at the time), being chosen as president at its founding in 1933. This aeroclub was the first such organisation in Yugoslavia, and functioned as a national team. He had already represented Yugoslavia at a 1925 FAI conference in Prague alongside Tadija Sondermajer. Đuričić is also recorded as the owner of the Naša Krila (Our Wings) magazine, whose editor was Serbian writer Miloš Crnjanski. Additionally, he was one of the founders of Aeroput — its founding assembly was held in the State Mortgage Bank in 1926.

Đuričić initiated the publishing of a monograph dedicated to Belgrade for its centennial. Titled Beograd, it came out in 1940. This book drew criticism from the German ambassador in Belgrade, who Đuričić had gifted a copy to, because of its depiction of Austro-Hungarian war crimes in Serbia during World War I, and he called for it to be banned. It was also attacked by the Vienna edition of Völkischer Beobachter, which declared the offending photographs to be "obviously" fake, and the book to be written under the influence of "British propaganda" and against the spirit of a New Europe. The book was eventually ordered to be destroyed, however a few copies survived, and it was published again in 2004. It is possible this incident is what drove Đuričić to his relatively early retirement.

== Death ==
In 1942, Đuričić was arrested by several SS officers and soldiers and taken to the cellar of what is today the Veterans Club Building, and later to the District Court. He was released just under a month later, however he was most likely beaten in prison, as he suffered from pain in the area around his kidneys and headaches, despite previously being in good health. His condition deteriorated, even more so when the 1944 bombing of Belgrade started. He was moved to the house of Vladimir Strzhizhevsky, which was in a safer part of town. Đuričić died on 29 July 1944, with uremia as the cause of death. He was buried at the New Cemetery in Belgrade.
