= Slavonska Banka =

Former bank in Croatia

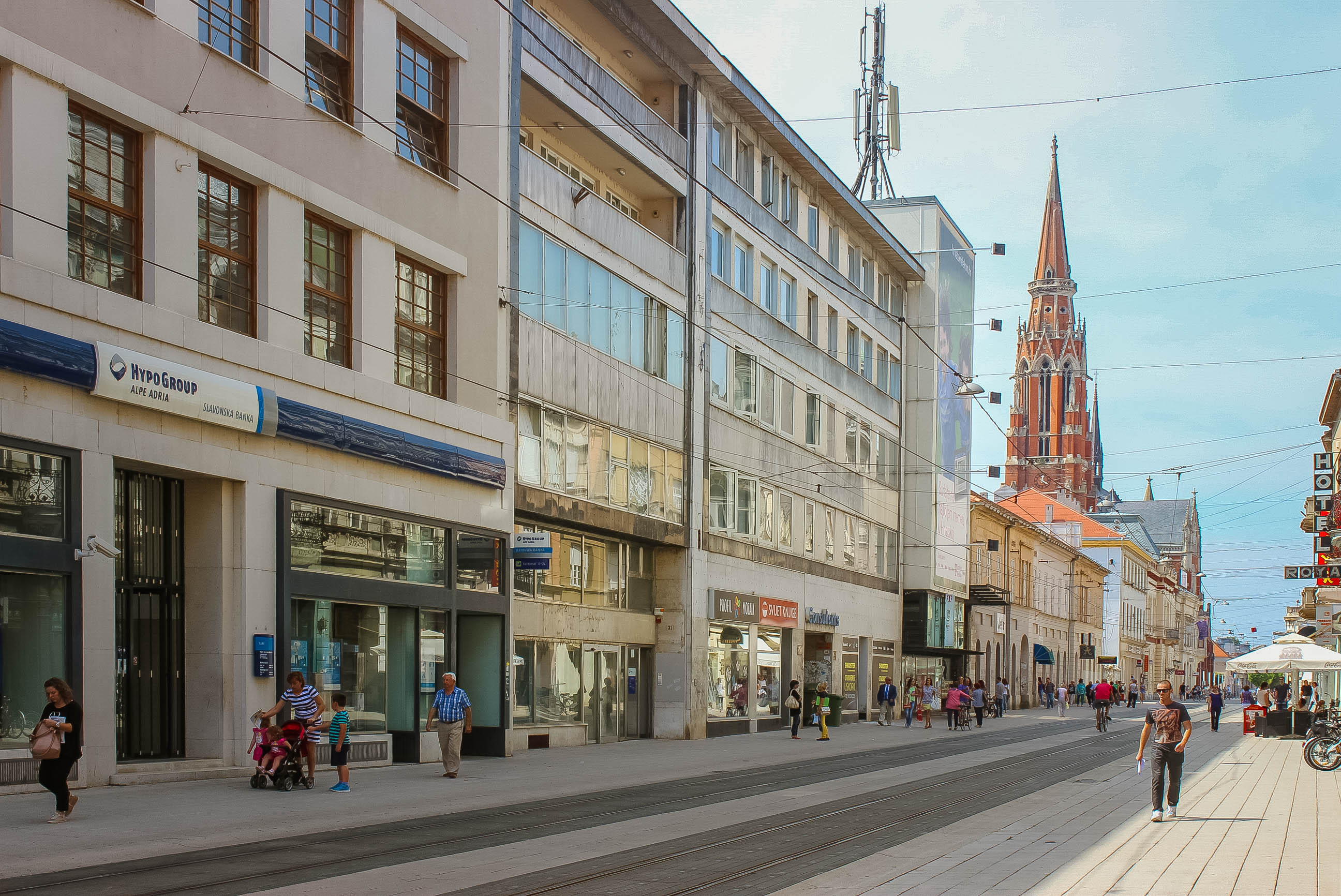
Former head office building of Slavonska Banka (far left), photographed in 2015

Slavonska Banka (lit. 'Bank of Slavonia') was a bank based in Osijek, now in Croatia.

== Overview ==
From late 1995 to 1997, Slavonska Banka entered a phase of restructuring led by the Croatian State Agency for Bank Rehabilitation and Deposit Insurance (Državna Agencija za osiguranja štednih uloga i sanaciju Banaka, DAB), which took 35 percent of its equity; the DAB simultaneously restructured Privredna Banka Zagreb, Riječka Banka, and Splitska Banka. In August 1998, a majority stake in Slavonska Banka was acquired by Kärntner Landes- und Hypothekenbank together with the European Bank for Reconstruction and Development (EBRD), marking the effective start of banking sector privatization in Croatia. In 2004, Kärntner Landes- und Hypothekenbank was renamed as Hypo Alpe Adria Bank.

In September 2007, Bayerische Landesbank acquired majority ownership in both Hypo Alpe-Adria-Bank Croatia and Slavonska Banka. By then, Slavonska Banka was the ninth-largest bank in Croatia. In 2009, Slavonska Banka was fully absorbed by Hypo Alpe-Adria-Bank Croatia, still majority-owned by Bayerische Landesbank.

In late 2014, it was announced that Hypo Group Alpe Adria AG, the Austrian entity that owned Hypo Alpe-Adria-Bank Croatia together with other operations in Southeast Europe, would be acquired by private equity firm Advent International together with the EBRD. The transaction as completed in 2015, when the network was rebranded as Addiko Bank.

Slavonska Banka was headquartered at Kapucinska ulica 29 in the center of Osijek.

== See also ==
- List of banks in Croatia
- List of banks in Yugoslavia
