= Yugoslav Investment Bank =

Former bank based in Belgrade

- Native name: Jugoslovenska investiciona banka
- Type: State-owned enterprise
- Industry: Financial services
- Founded: 1956
- Defunct: 1978
- Fate: Reorganized
- Successor: Investbanka and Beogradska Banka
- Headquarters: Belgrade, Yugoslavia
- Area served: Yugoslavia
- Products: Banking services, loans
- Owner: Federal Executive Council of the Socialist Federal Republic of Yugoslavia

The Yugoslav Investment Bank (YIB, Serbo-Croatian: Jugoslovenska investiciona banka or JIB) was a state-owned bank in Yugoslavia, based in Belgrade. Established in 1956, it was soon undermined by the financial decentralization reforms advocated by Edvard Kardelj. In 1978, its residual operations in the Socialist Republic of Serbia were reorganized as Investbanka.

== History ==
The YIB was established in 1956 from credit operations of the National Bank of Yugoslavia (NBJ), marking the end of Yugoslavia's pure monobank system but still conforming to the Communist framework of a single-tier banking system. It was the main credit provider to the economy, complemented by the more specialized Yugoslav Bank for Foreign Trade and Yugoslav Agricultural Bank, and also administered Yugoslavia's General Investment Fund until the latter's liquidation in 1963. Despite its birth by spinoff from the NBJ, the YIB portrayed itself in the 1960s as the continuator of the State Investment Bank of Yugoslavia which had been in existence between 1946 and 1952. In the early 1970s, it went further and claimed the legacy of Serbia's oldest semi-modern credit institution, the Uprava Fondova, thus tracing origins back to 1862 and adding that date to its logo.

The decentralization process that led to the YIB's demise started in the early 1960s. In 1961, so-called Republic Banks were established in each of the six republics of Yugoslavia. In 1963, the YIB's regional head offices in the respective republics were abolished, and their activities were transferred to the republic banks. The fragmentation of the Yugoslav financial system along Republic boundaries accelerated in the 1970s, when the central authority of the NBJ was replaced with the System of National Banks.

In 1978, most of the remaining activities of the YIB in Serbia were merged with Beogradska Banka and rebranded as Investbanka, while other parts of its legacy portfolio were taken over by the United Belgrade Bank, a newly formed so-called associated bank.

The YIB was headquartered on No. 9 Terazije, the longstanding center of business activity in Belgrade.

== See also ==
- List of banks in Yugoslavia
