= Yugoslav Agricultural Bank =

Former bank based in Belgrade

- Type: State-owned enterprise
- Industry: Financial services
- Founded: 1956
- Founder: National Bank of Yugoslavia
- Defunct: 2011
- Fate: Liquidated
- Headquarters: Belgrade, Yugoslavia
- Area served: Yugoslavia
- Products: Banking services
- Owner: Government of Yugoslavia

The Yugoslav Agricultural Bank (Serbo-Croatian: Jugoslovenska poljoprivredna banka, also known as Poljobanka) was a state-owned bank in Yugoslavia, based in Belgrade, established in 1956. In 1978, it was reorganized and rebranded as Agrobanka. Agrobanka was placed in receivership in late 2011 and subsequently liquidated.

== History ==
Poljobanka was established in 1956 from agricultural credit operations of the National Bank of Yugoslavia (NBJ), marking the end of Yugoslavia's pure monobank system but still conforming to the Communist framework of a single-tier banking system. It complemented the new credit system that also included the Yugoslav Bank for Foreign Trade and Yugoslav Investment Bank.

Despite Poljobanka's birth in 1956 by spinoff from the NBJ, Agrobanka portrayed itself as the continuator not just of Poljobanka but also of the Privileged Agrarian Bank of Yugoslavia which had been in existence between 1929 and 1946.

Agrobanka was placed into receivership by the Serbian authorities on 29 December 2011, and the National Bank of Serbia revoked its license on 25 May 2012, appointing the Deposit Insurance Agency (DIA) as administrator. The DIA created a new entity, Nova Agrobanka a.d. Beograd, as a bridge bank. Multiple arrests were made in the context of the Agrobanka case.

== See also ==
- List of banks in Yugoslavia
