= List of banks in Yugoslavia =

This list of banks in Yugoslavia includes banks that were active in the former Yugoslavia, between 1918 and 1941 and between 1945 and 1991.

== Central banks ==
The Privileged National Bank of the Kingdom of Serbia took over the role of central bank for the new country in late 1918 and was subsequently renamed several times, as National Bank of the Kingdom of Serbs, Croats and Slovenes (in 1920) then National Bank of the Kingdom of Yugoslavia (in 1929). It was already then commonly referred to as the National Bank of Yugoslavia. During World War II, some of its operations were taken up by the Serbian National Bank and Croatian State Bank. The National Bank of the Federal People’s Republic of Yugoslavia was (re-)established in 1946 and eventually took the name National Bank of Yugoslavia (NBJ) in 1961.

In the early 1970s, Yugoslavia replaced the unitary NBJ with a system of National Banks in which a downsized NBJ eventually coexisted with eight sub-federal national banks, one for each of the country's six republics and two autonomous provinces:

- National Bank of Bosnia and Herzegovina
- National Bank of Croatia
- National Bank of Macedonia
- National Bank of Montenegro
- National Bank of Serbia
- National Bank of Slovenia

Following the breakup of Yugoslavia, the respective National Banks of Bosnia and Herzegovina, Croatia, Macedonia and Slovenia became fully-fledged central banks of the respective countries, whereas those of Montenegro and Serbia which were downgraded to branch status as the NBJ became the rump country's unitary central bank. The Central Bank of Kosovo was later (re-)created following the country's secession from Serbia in 1999, as was the Central Bank of Montenegro in 2001.

== Interwar period ==
=== Pre-existing banks ===
Many of the banks that operated in Yugoslavia during the interwar period had started operating under the previous regimes of the Austrian-Hungarian Empire and Kingdom of Serbia, some of which adopted a new name in the newly established country.

- Carniola Savings Bank (1820–1945)
- First Croatian Savings Bank (1846–1945)
- Uprava Fondova (1862-1922)
- Croatian Discount Bank (1868–1928)
- Belgrade Cooperative Bank (1882–1944)
- Kraljevo Joint-Stock Savings Bank (1885–1941)
- Croatian-Slavonian Land Mortgage Bank (1892–1928)
- Landesbank für Bosnien und Herzegowina (1895–1948)
- Prometna banka (1895–1945)
- Serbian Bank in Zagreb (1895–1945)
- Ljubljana Credit Bank (1900–1945)
- Croatian Landesbank (1909-1920)
- Banque Franco-Serbe (1910–1946)
- Banque de Salonique (1893–1941)
- City Savings Bank of Zagreb (1913–1952)
- Croatian General Credit Bank (1912–1945)
- Kraljevo Commercial Bank (1912–1941)

=== Banks established under Yugoslav rule ===
- Slavenska Banka (1918–1925)
- Jugoslavenska Banka (1920–1941)
- Jagodinska Prometna Banka (1921–1946)
- Postal Savings Bank of Yugoslavia (1921-1946)
- State Mortgage Bank of Yugoslavia (1922–1946)
- Adriatic-Danubian Bank (1924–1945)
- Kraljevo Commercial Credit Institution (1924–1941)
- General Yugoslavian Bank Union (1928–1944)
- Yugoslav United Bank (1928–1941)
- Privileged Agrarian Bank of Yugoslavia (1929-1946)

== Single-tier system era ==
In the late 1940s, Yugoslavia established a rigid single-tier banking system in which a few policy banks coexisted with the National Bank but only to fulfil specialized tasks and without competing with each other. From 1952 to 1955 the system was purely monobank, with the NBJ acting as the country's sole credit institution. Starting in 1955, the single-tier system was gradually relaxed, with both local deposit banks and nationwide specialized credit institutions.

=== National banks ===
- State Investment Bank of Yugoslavia (1946–1952)
- Yugoslav Bank for Foreign Trade (1955–1970)
- Yugoslav Investment Bank (1956–1978)
- Yugoslav Agricultural Bank (1956-1978)

=== Local banks ===
- Riječka Banka (1954-2002)
- Komunalna Banka Kragujevac (1955–1970)
- Komunalna Banka Skopje (1955-1966)
- Ljubljanska Banka (1955–1994)
- Čačanska Banka (1956–2015)

== Later establishments ==
Yugoslavia exited the single-tier system in the early 1960s, with increasingly commercialized credit institutions especially in the 1970s and 1980s.

- Privredna Banka Zagreb (est. 1962)
- Investment Bank Titograd (1962-1990)
- Privredna Banka Sarajevo (est. 1962)
- Stopanska Banka Skopje (est. 1962)
- Komercijalna Banka Skopje (est. 1955)
- Splitska banka (1965–2018)
- Kosovska Banka (1960s?–1999)
- Slavonska Banka (1960s?-2009)
- Jugobanka (1970–2002)
- Beogradska Banka (1971–2002)
- Komercijalna Banka Beograd (1970–2020)
- United Bank of Croatia (1971?-1991?)
- Vojvođanska banka (1973–2019)
- AIK Banka (1976–1993)
- Zagrebačka banka (est. 1977)
- Agrobanka (1978–2012)
- Investbanka (1978–2002)
- Nikšićka Banka (1978–2007)
- Yugoslav Bank for International Economic Cooperation (1979–2020)
- Gorenjska Banka (est. 1989)
- Société Générale Yugoslav Bank (1991–2007)

== See also ==
- List of banks in Bosnia and Herzegovina
- List of banks in Croatia
- List of banks in Kosovo
- List of banks in Montenegro
- List of banks in North Macedonia
- List of banks in Serbia
- List of banks in Slovenia
- List of banks in Europe
