= State Investment Bank of Yugoslavia =

Former financial institution in Communist Yugoslavia

The State Investment Bank of Yugoslavia (Serbo-Croatian: Državna investiciona banka, DIB) was a state-owned bank in Yugoslavia, based in Belgrade. Established in 1946, it soon became the dominant component of Yugoslavia's Communist financial system alongside the National Bank of Yugoslavia (NBJ). It was eventually merged into the NBJ in 1952.

== History ==
Following the liberation of the country by the Yugoslav Partisans, the State Investment Bank was formed to operate much of the expropriated banking sector under the new Communist regime, and in August 1946 absorbed the State Mortgage Bank, one of the country's preeminent credit institutions.

In late 1946, the NBJ absorbed the Industrial Bank, the Craftsmen’s Bank, and the Cooperative and Agricultural Bank, Postal Savings Bank, and other parts of the banking sector, but the State Investment Bank was exempted from that wave of mergers as were a few dozens small savings banks mainly in Slovenia. In the following few years, the DIB provided long-term and investment credit, while the NBJ provided short-term credit and monetary issuance.

The DIB started with a network of 17 local branches, which eventually expanded to 31. By government decision of 20 March 1952, the State Investment Bank in turn was merged into the National Bank of Yugoslavia. As a result, Yugoslavia operated a pure monobank system during the next few years.

== See also ==
- List of banks in Yugoslavia
