= Ministry of Culture (Montenegro) =

Government ministry of Montenegro

Ministry of Culture and Media
- Ministarstvo kulture i medija
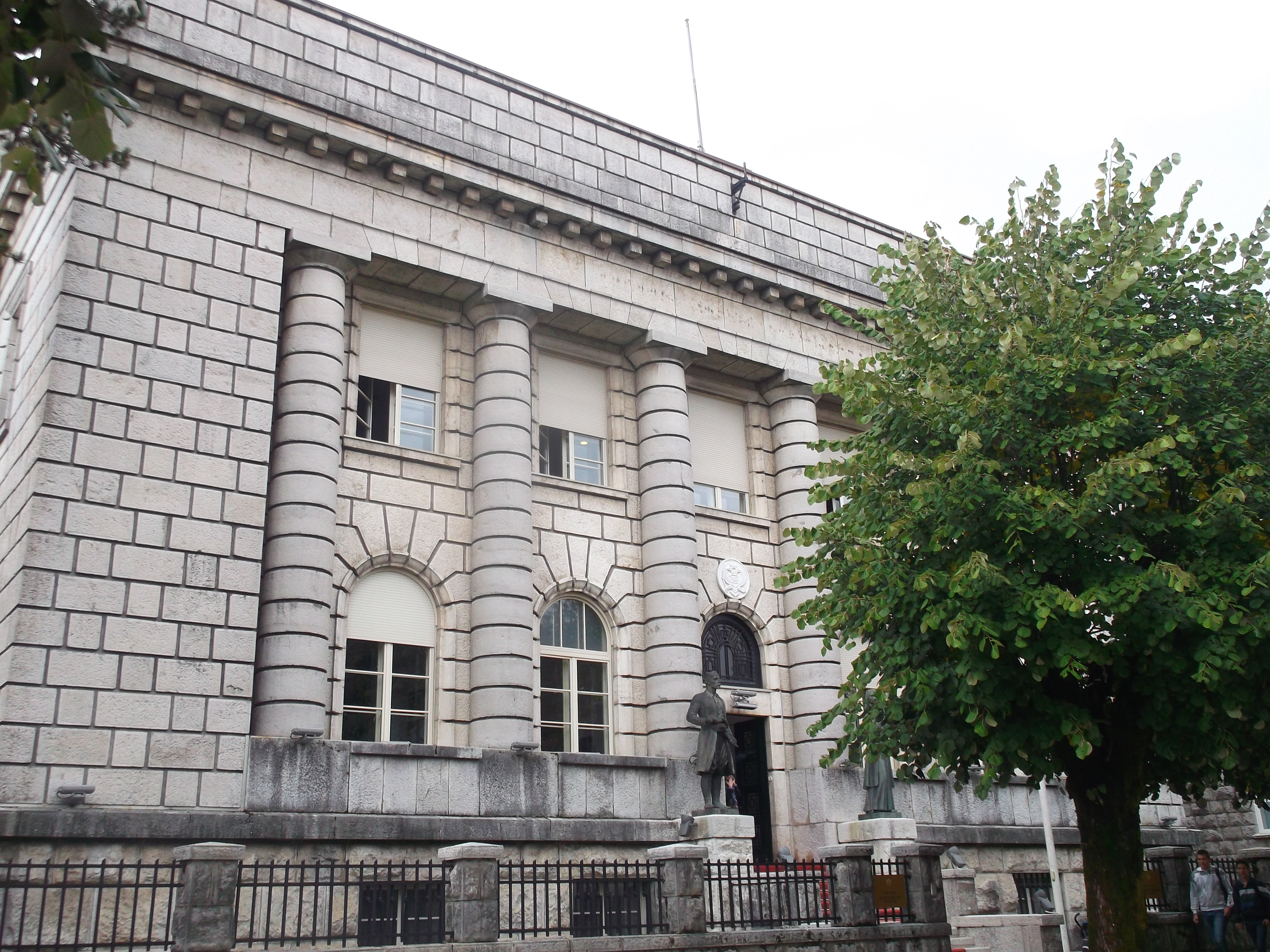

Agency overview
- Formed: 2006
- Jurisdiction: Government of Montenegro
- Headquarters: Cetinje
- Agency executive: Maša Vlaović, Minister of Culture of Montenegro
- Website: mk.gov.me

The Minister of Culture and Media (Montenegrin: Министар културе и медија / Ministar kulture i medija) is the person in charge of the Ministry of Culture and Media of Montenegro. In 2020, the Ministry merged into the Ministry of Education, Science, Culture and Sports. It was once again re-established in 2022, under the name of the Ministry of Culture and Media. Its headquarters are in Cetinje, in the former branch building of State Mortgage Bank of Yugoslavia.

== Ministers of Culture, 2006–2020 ==
Democratic Party of Socialists Non-partisan

Minister	Start of term	End of term
Predrag Sekulić	10 November 2006	29 February 2008
Branislav Mićunović	29 February 2008	12 May 2016
Pavle Goranović	12 May 2016	28 November 2016
Janko Ljumović	28 November 2016	28 December 2017
Aleksandar Bogdanović	28 December 2017	4 December 2020
Maša Vlaović	28 April 2022	incumbent
