= Investbanka =

Former bank in Belgrade

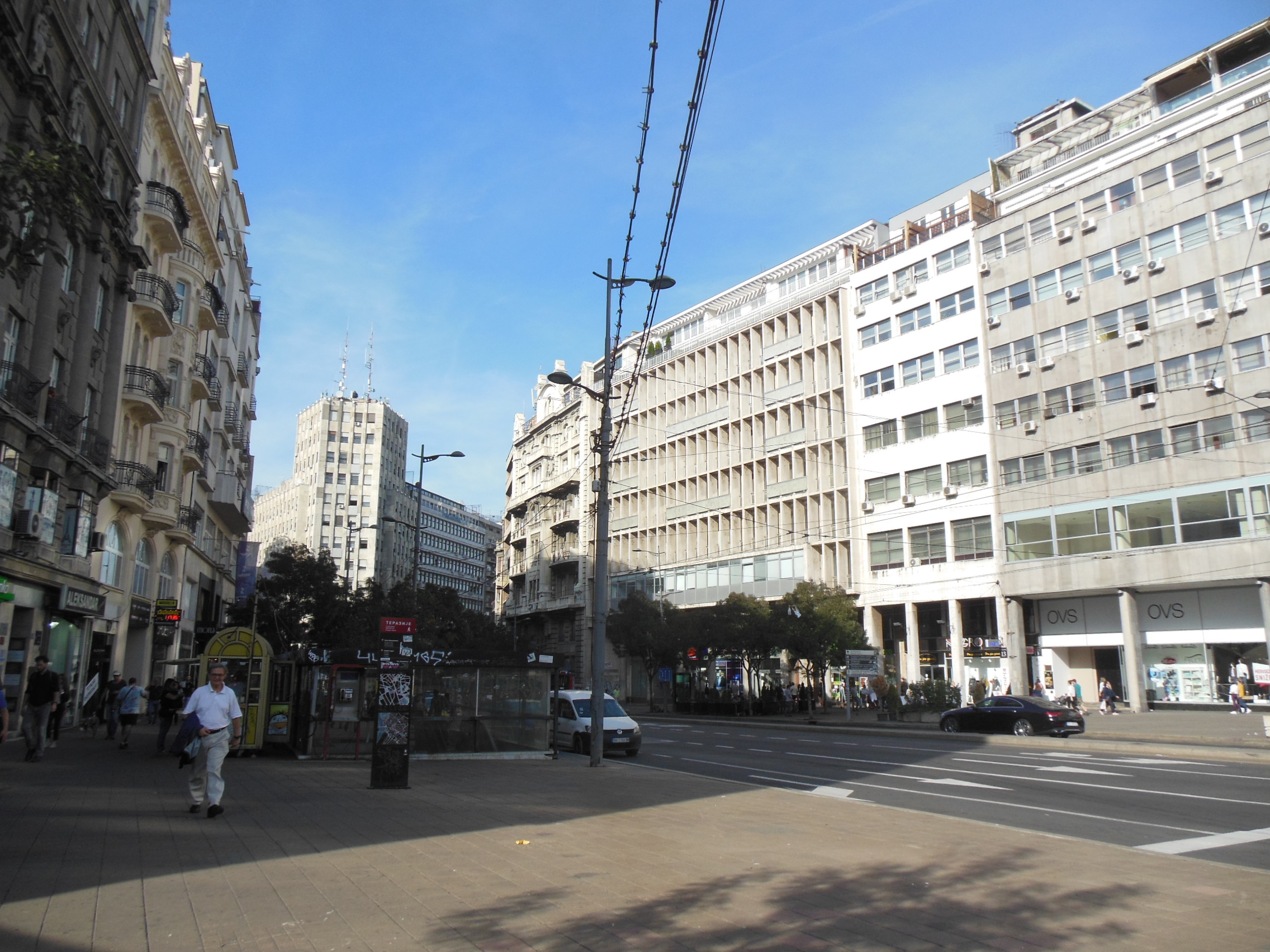
- Former Investbanka building on Terazije (center)
- Type: Government-owned bank
- Industry: Financial services
- Predecessor: Uprava Fondova
- Founded: January 1, 1978
- Defunct: 2002
- Fate: Liquidated after the breakup of Yugoslavia
- Headquarters: Belgrade, Yugoslavia
- Area served: Yugoslavia
- Products: Investment banking

Investbanka, full name Investiciona Banka u Beogradu (lit. 'Investment Bank in Belgrade'), was a bank in Yugoslavia, based in Belgrade. Established in 1978, it became unviable following the breakup of Yugoslavia and was placed into liquidation in 2002.

== History ==
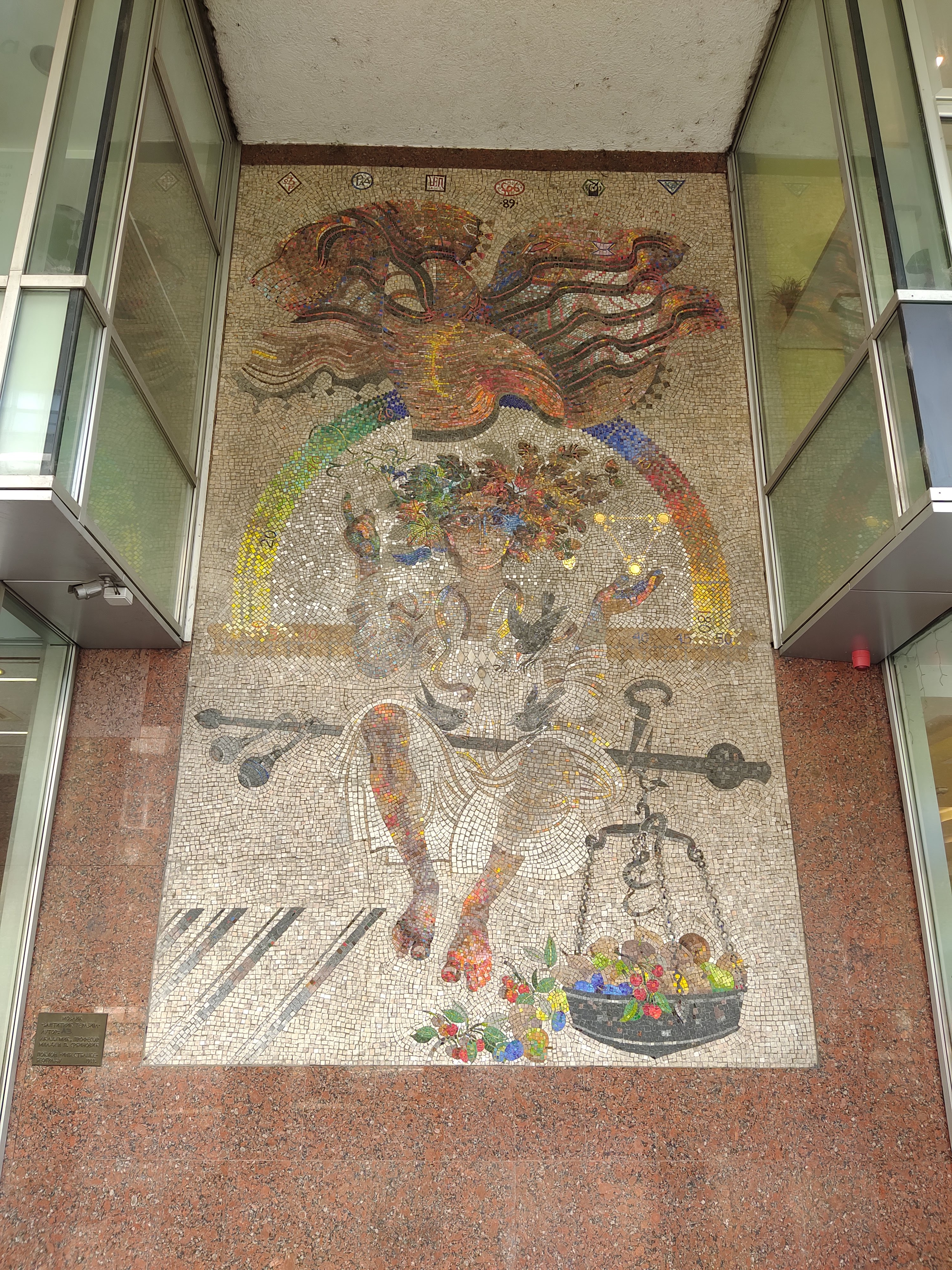
Mosaic The Protector of Terazije

Investbanka was established on 1 January 1978 as part of the restructuring of the Yugoslav Investment Bank (YIB) and Beogradska Banka. The latter, renamed Udružena Beogradska Banka (UBB), became one of nine so-called associated banks that formed the backbone of the commercial banking sector in Yugoslavia (together with Jugobanka in Belgrade, Vojvođanska Banka in Novi Sad, Kosovska Banka in Pristina, United Bank of Croatia in Zagreb, Ljubljanska Banka, Privredna Banka Sarajevo, Stopanska Banka in Skopje, and Investment Bank Titograd).

Investbanka became an affiliate of the UBB Group, and took over many of the YIB's former operations. In its early years of activity, it was a major source of credit in the Socialist Republic of Serbia.

As the YIB had done in earlier years, Investbanka promoted itself as the continuating entity of Uprava Fondova and the State Mortgage Bank of Yugoslavia, even though there was a discontinuity of that legacy (however construed) during Yugoslavia monobank era of the 1950s.

On 1 January 1990, in the context of reforms led by Yugoslav prime minister Ante Marković, Investbanka was separated from the UBB cluster and became an independent bank, with head office in Serbia and branches in the other Yugoslav republics.

Investbanka was eventually placed into liquidation in 2002 together with its then-peers Beobanka, Beogradska Banka, and Jugobanka, as public confidence in those banks had effectively evaporated. The liquidation proceedings were still ongoing by 2015.

== Head office ==
Investbanka was headquartered on No. 9 Terazije, previously the head office location of the Yugoslav Investment Bank. A reconstruction of the building was completed in 1989 on a design by architect Predrag Ðaković. The building is graced on the street level with a monumental mosaic by visual artist Mladen Srbinović, also created in 1989 and titled The Protector of Terazije.

== See also ==
- List of banks in Yugoslavia
