= Privileged Agrarian Bank of Yugoslavia =

Former bank in Belgrade

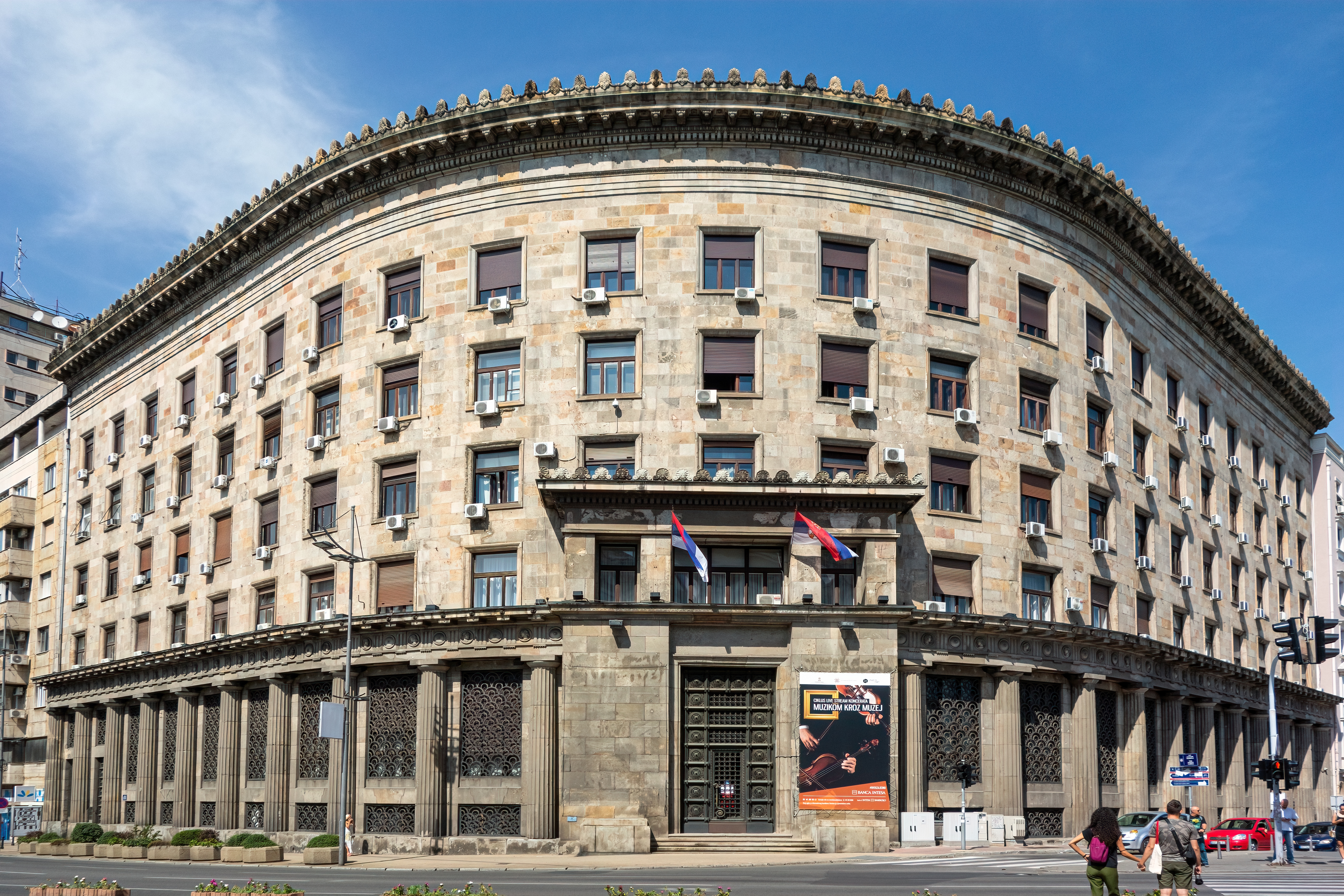
- Agrarian Bank Building in Belgrade, completed in 1934, lately Historical Museum of Serbia
- Type: State-owned enterprise
- Industry: Financial services
- Founded: 1929
- Defunct: 1946
- Fate: Nationalized
- Successor: National Bank
- Headquarters: Belgrade, Yugoslavia
- Area served: Yugoslavia
- Products: Agricultural lending, banking services

The Privileged Agrarian Bank (Serbo-Croatian: Privilegovana agrarna banka) was a bank in Yugoslavia, based in Belgrade. It was established in 1929 by special charter ("privilege") to support the country's agricultural sector. It was renamed Cooperative and Agricultural Bank in 1945, then fully nationalized in 1946.

== History ==
In the 1930s, the Agrarian Bank was one of the main credit institutions in Yugoslavia, together with the National Bank, Craftsmen's Bank, State Mortgage Bank, and Postal Savings Bank.

The Agrarian Bank was reorganized under the Law on the Organization and Operation of the Crediting System of 26 October 1945, under which it was declared a federal credit institution and renamed Cooperative and Agricultural Bank. Then by degree of 25 September 1946, the Cooperative and Agricultural Bank was fully nationalized and became part of the National Bank under Yugoslavia's monobank system.

== See also ==
- List of banks in Yugoslavia
