= Agrarian Bank Building =

Cultural monument in Belgrade, Serbia

Agrarian Bank Building, Belgrade
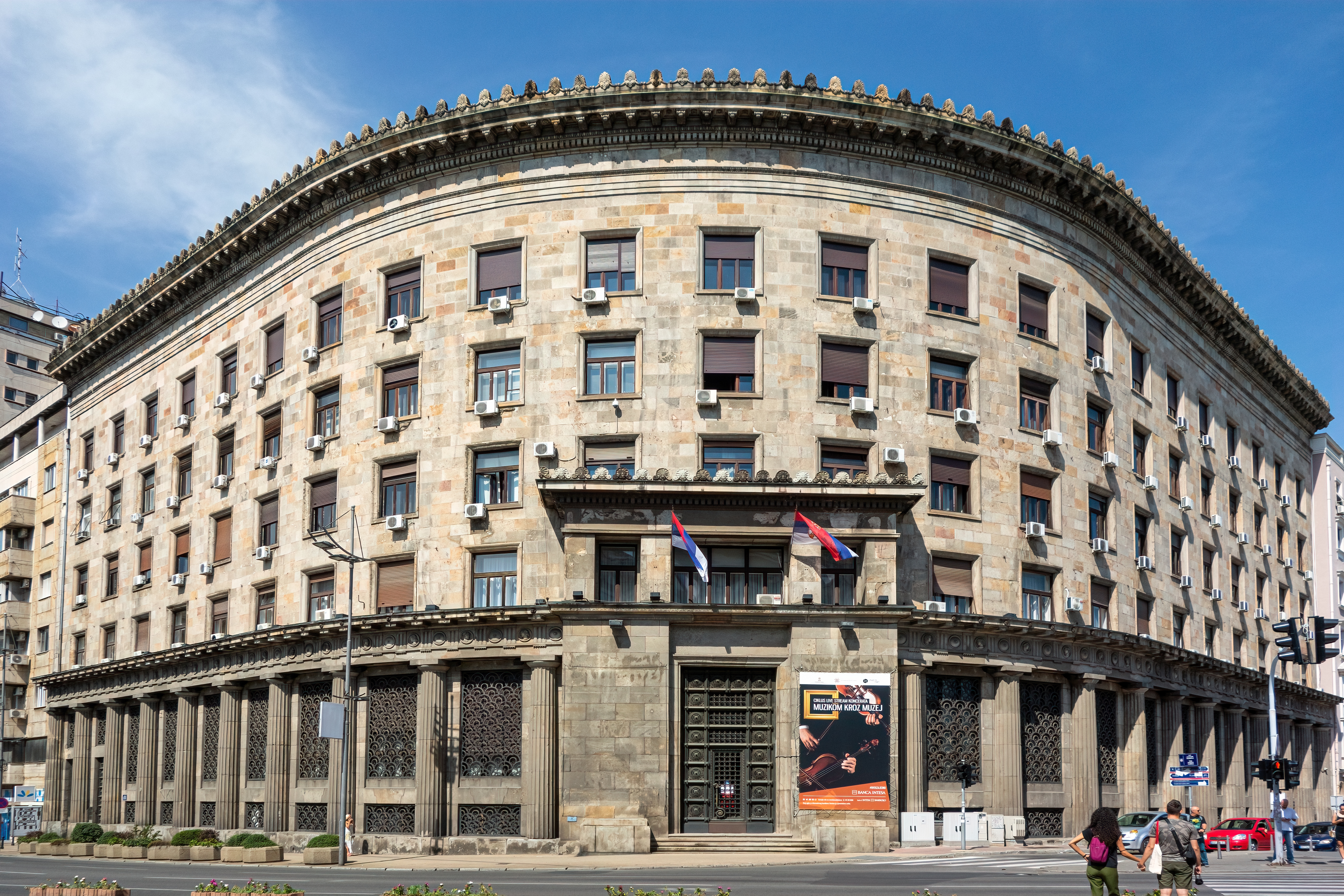
- Established: 1932–1934
- Location: Stari Grad, Belgrade, Serbia
- Coordinates: 44°48′45″N 20°27′49″E
- Type: Cultural monument

The Agrarian Bank Building (Serbian: Зграда Аграрне банк, romanized: Zgrada Agrarne bank), located at the corner of Nikole Pašića Square and Vlajkovićeva Street, in the territory of the municipality of Stari Grad, in Belgrade, has the status of a cultural monument. It was built for the Privileged Agrarian Bank of Yugoslavia on a design by architects Petar and Branko Krstić.

== History ==
The management board of the Privileged Agrarian Bank announced a competition for a new, representative building of the Bank at the end of 1930, and the building itself was built between 1932 and 1934 as one of the last banking palaces of Belgrade between the two world wars, which represented the political and economic strength of the country. The Krstić brothers won third prize in the competition, but the decision was still reached to entrust the construction to them, with the change of the original conception of the facade.

== Architecture ==
It was conceived as a representative office building with an angular, curved façade and a monumental entrance foyer. According to its architectural characteristics, the building belongs to a group of buildings where the authors achieved compromise between the academic and modernist conceptions of аrchitecture and can be considered a masterpiece of Serbian Art Deco. Three-part division of the facade, revamped with a series of Ionic columns in the ground-floor and the characteristic roof cornice, gave an academic characteristic to the external appearance of the building, while the composition of the whole and functional solution reflect the preference of the author for the modernist concept of architecture. The work was done by the brothers Petar and Branko Krstić, who gave a significant contribution to the formation of the appearance of the central zone of Belgrade with this project and is one of their most significant achievements. The building structure is made in reinforced concrete post and petrail, and the facade is lined with Belovode sandstone.

After World War II, the building underwent some changes and it was overbuilt according to the project of Krstić brothers.

The building now houses the Historical Museum of Serbia.

=== Sculpture ===
The author of the sculptures and numerous reliefs in the staircase hall of the Agrarian Bank was the sculptor Lojze Dolinar, and the main portal and the grates in the colonnade were made by Milenko Đorđević.

== Gallery ==
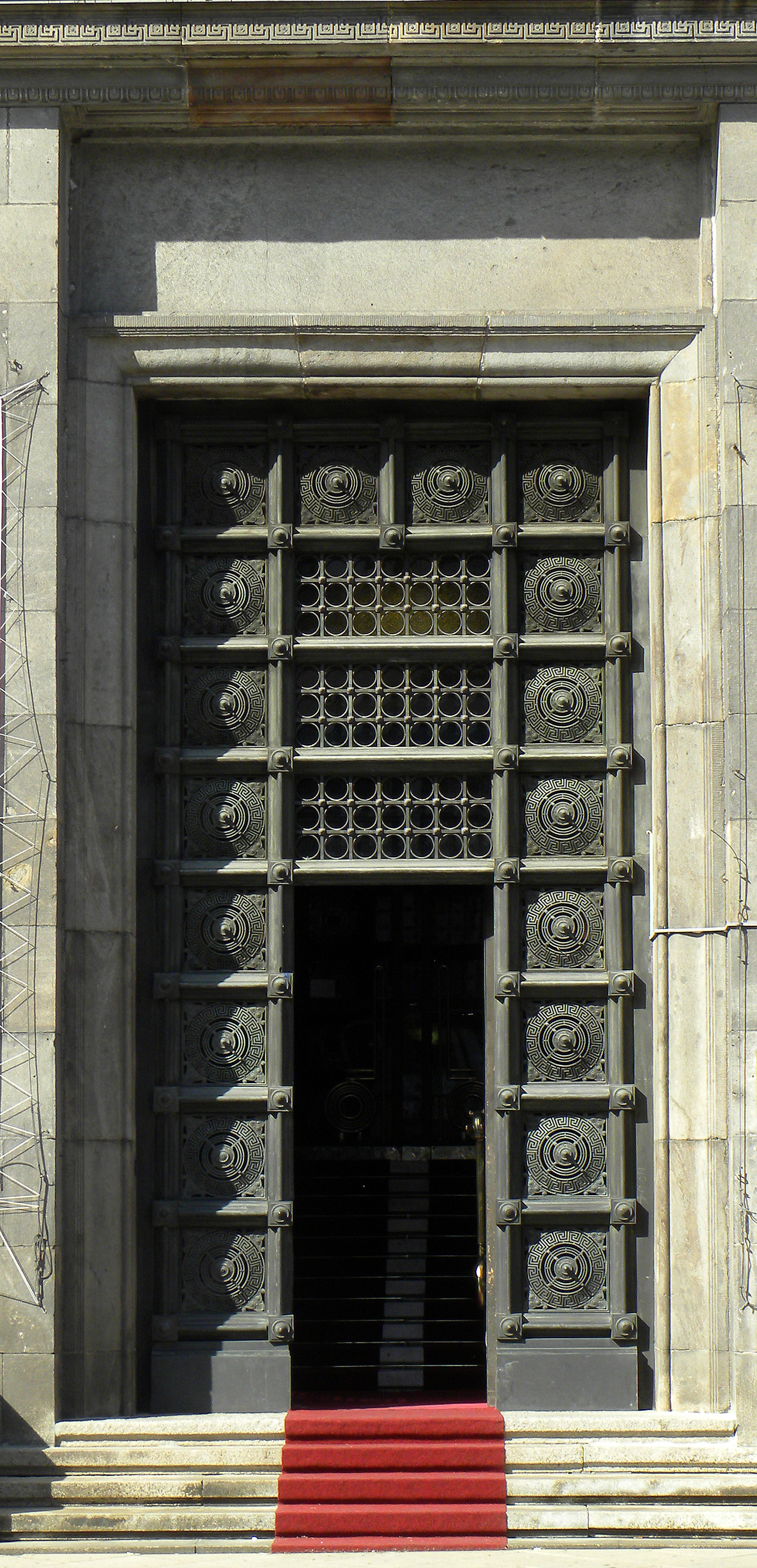
Agrarian Bank Building, detail

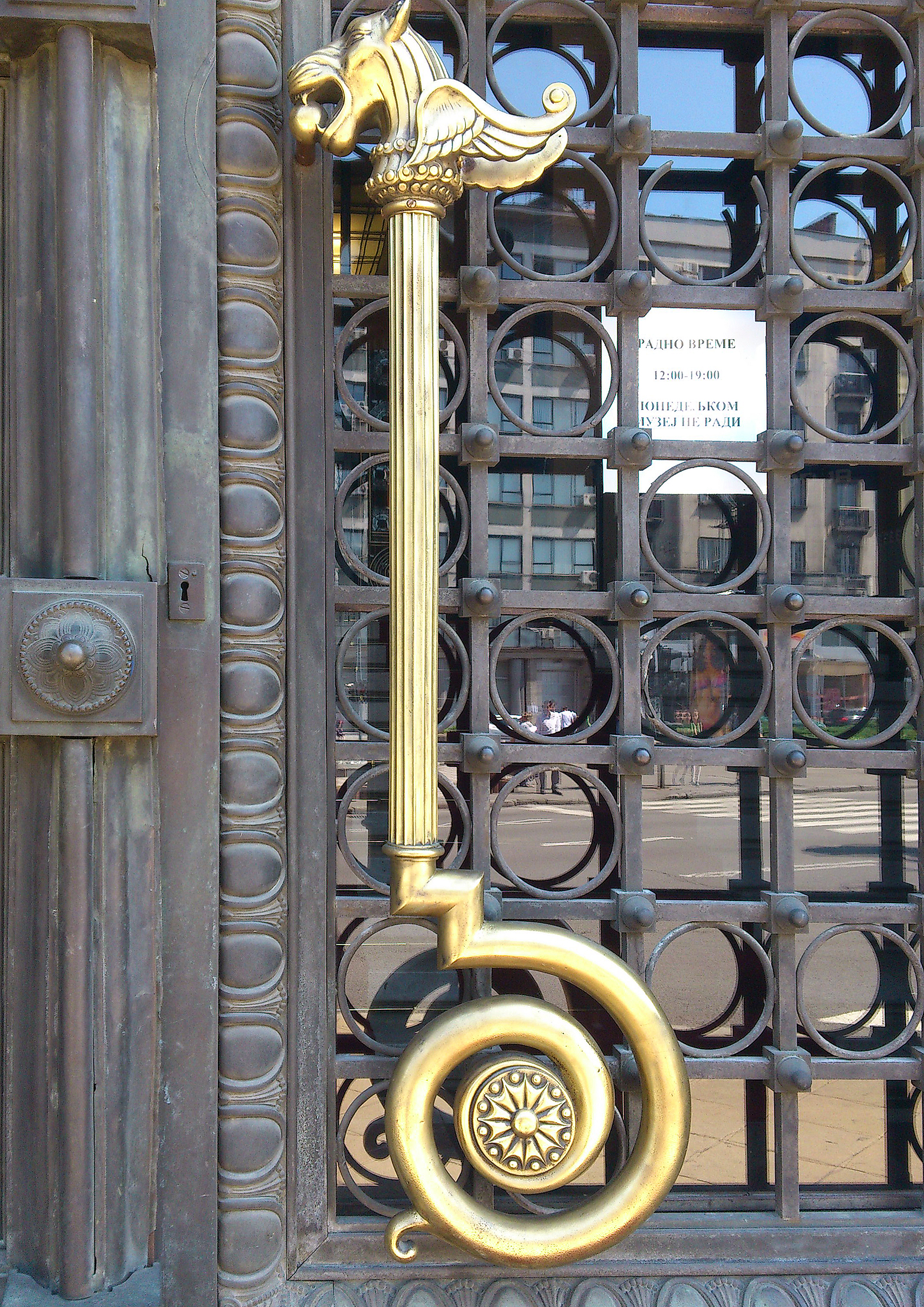
Agrarian Bank Building, detail

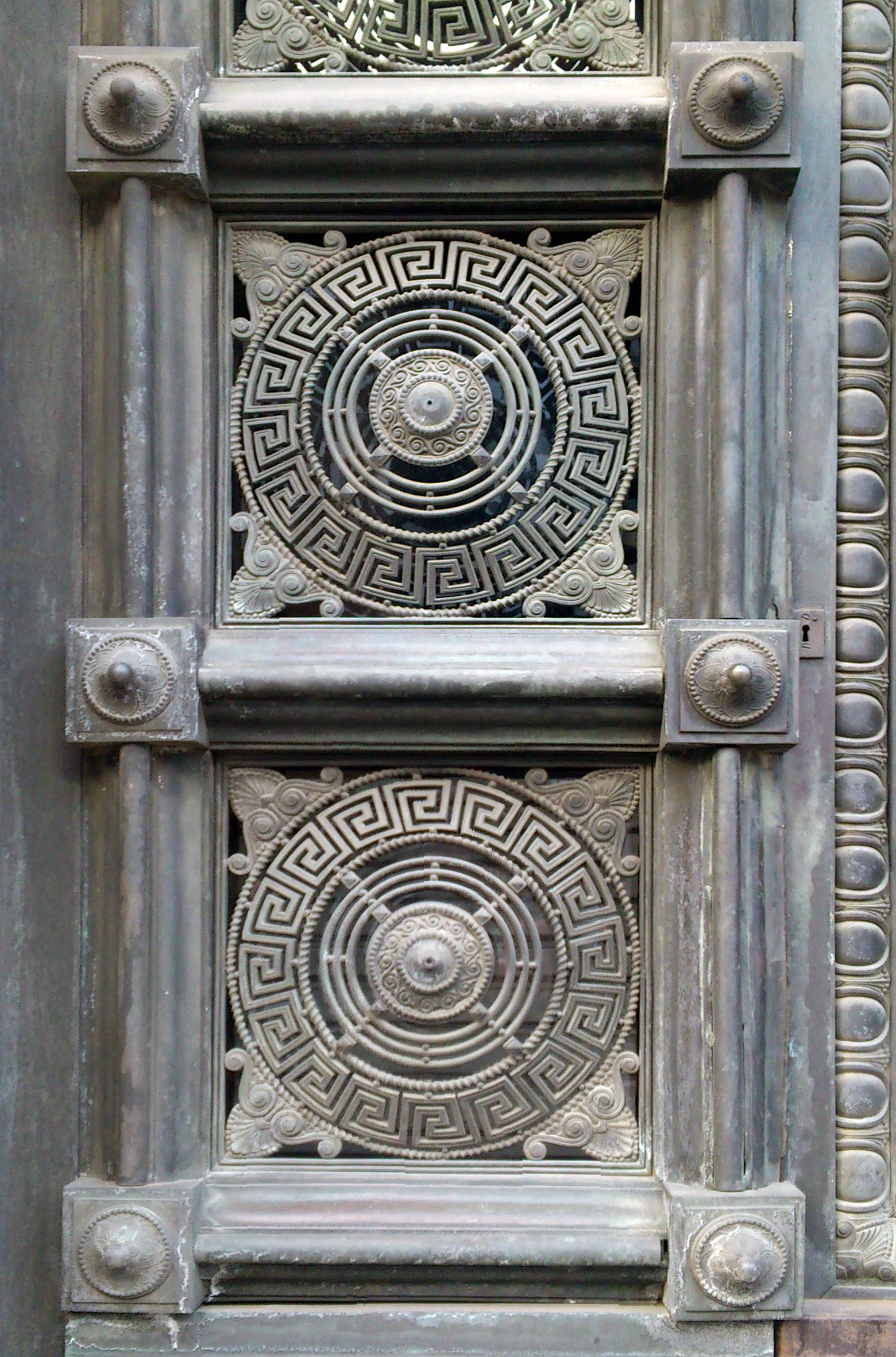
Agrarian Bank Building, detail

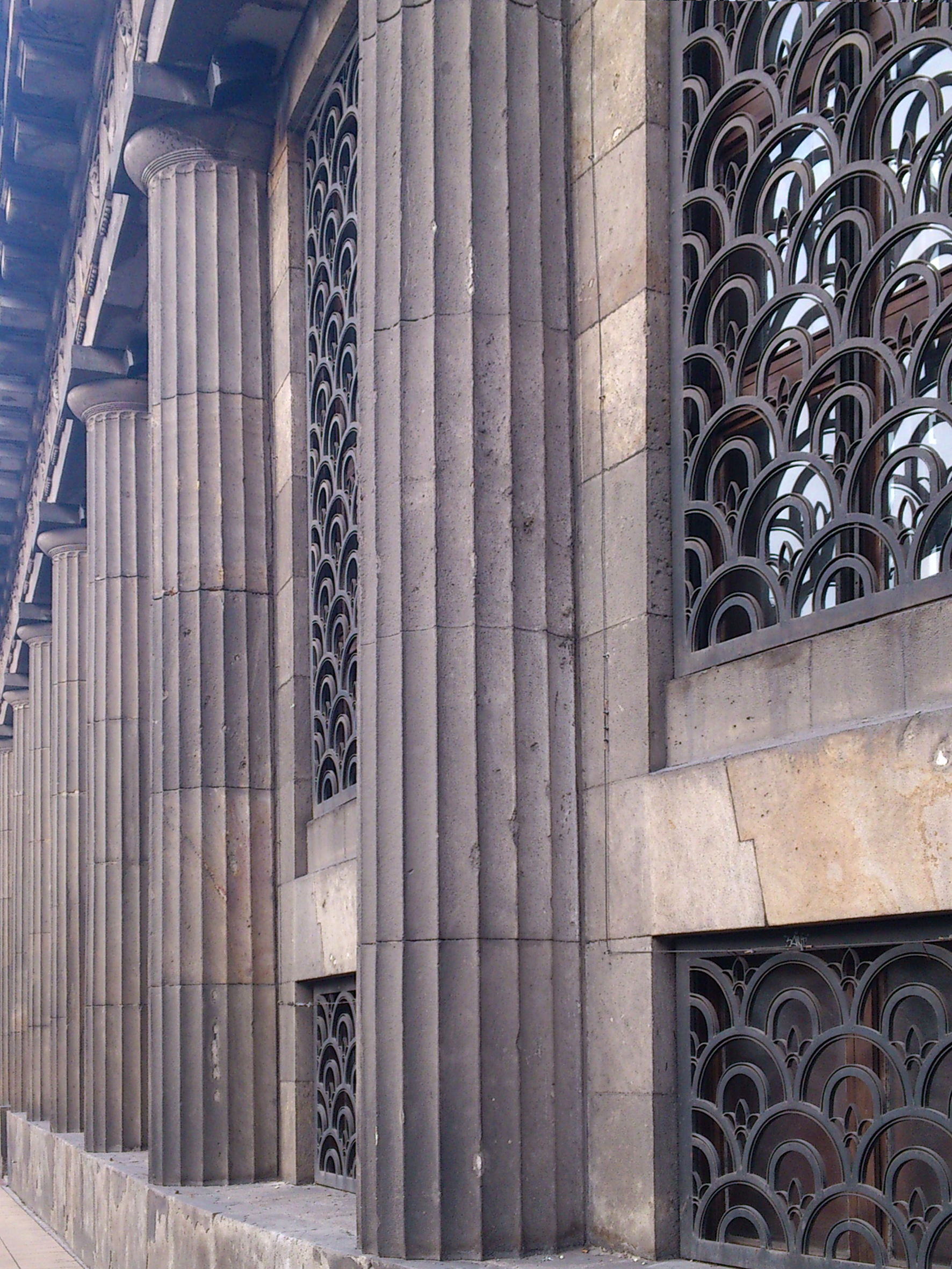
Agrarian Bank Building, detail

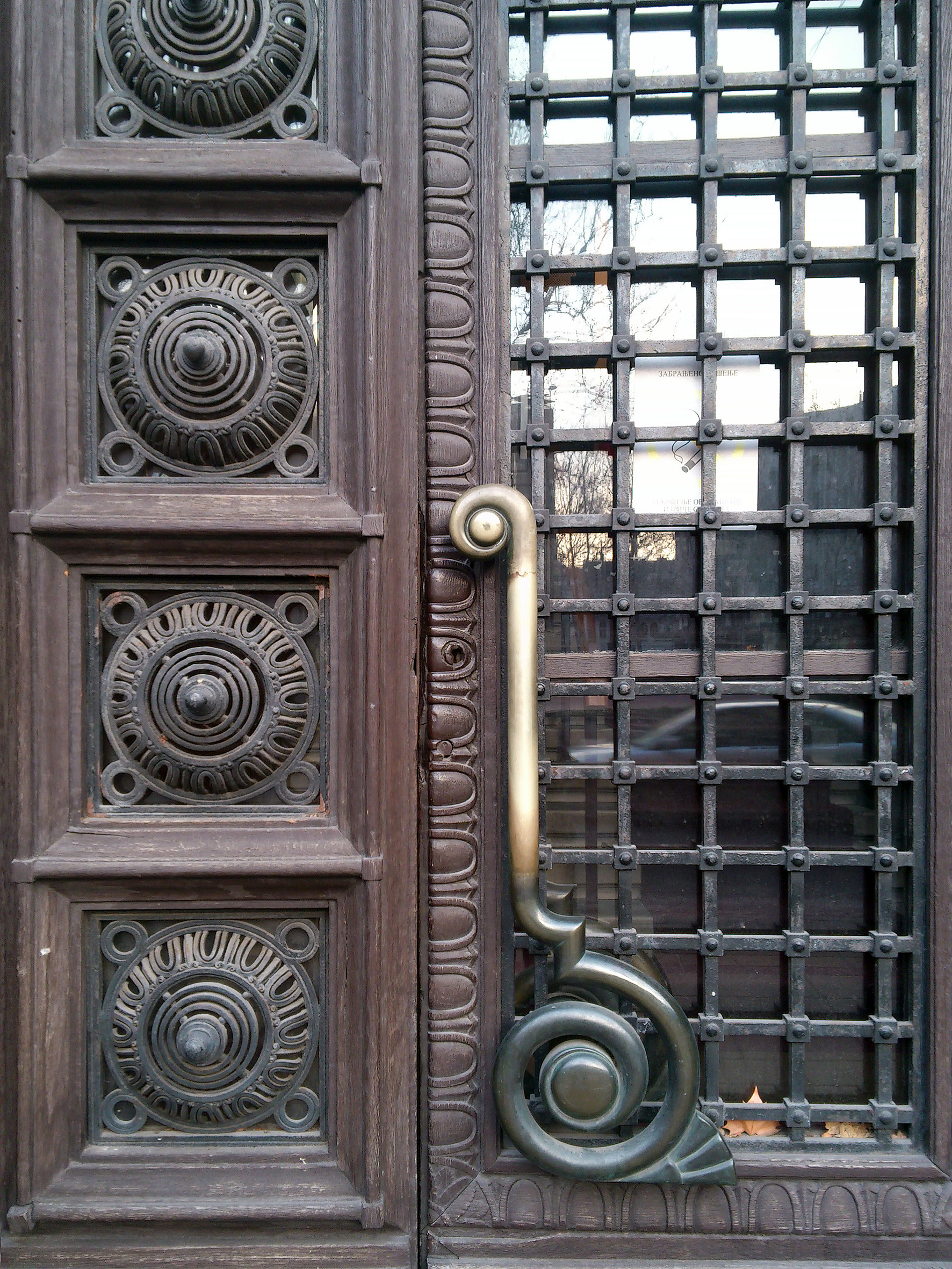
Agrarian Bank Building, detail
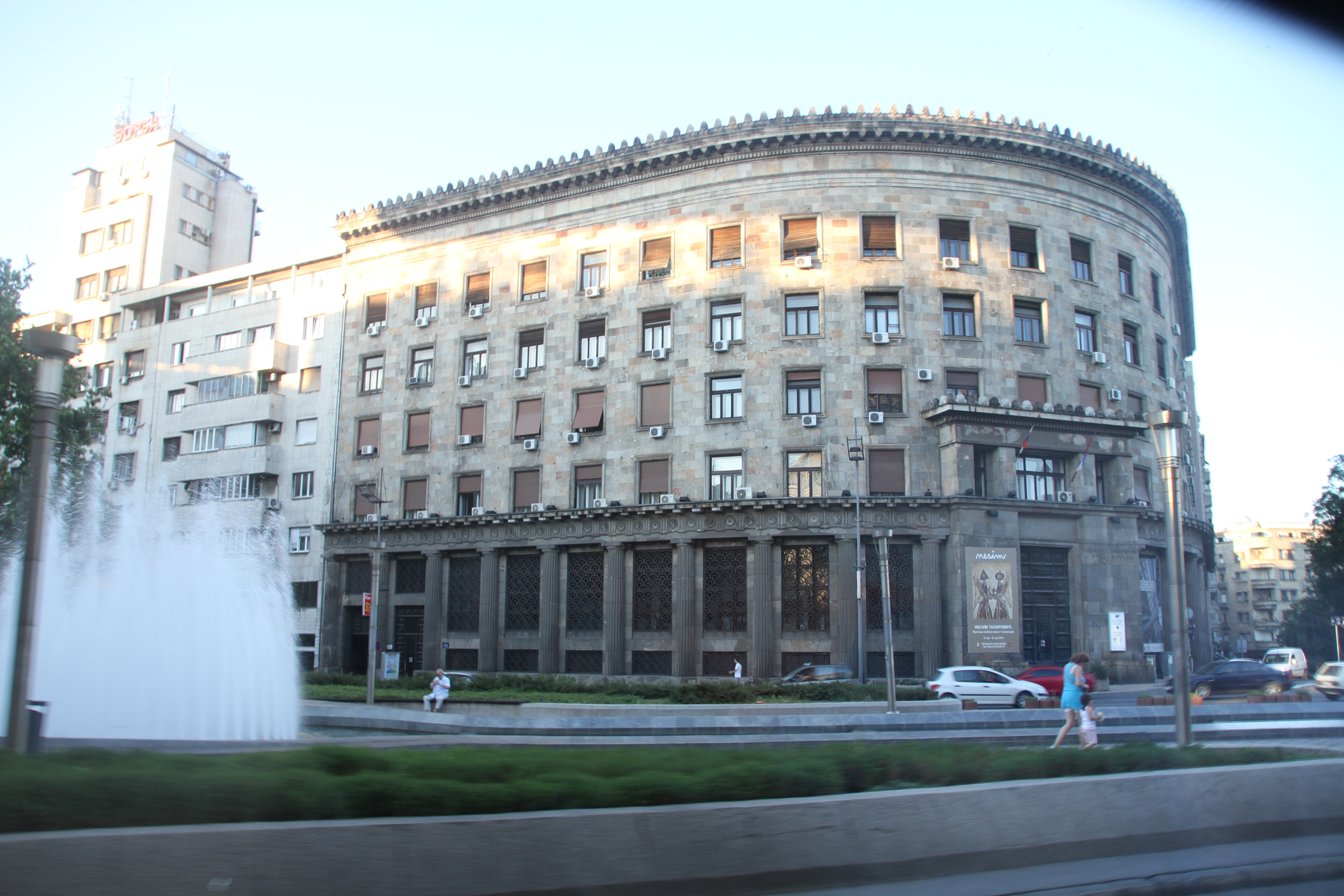
Agrarian Bank Building

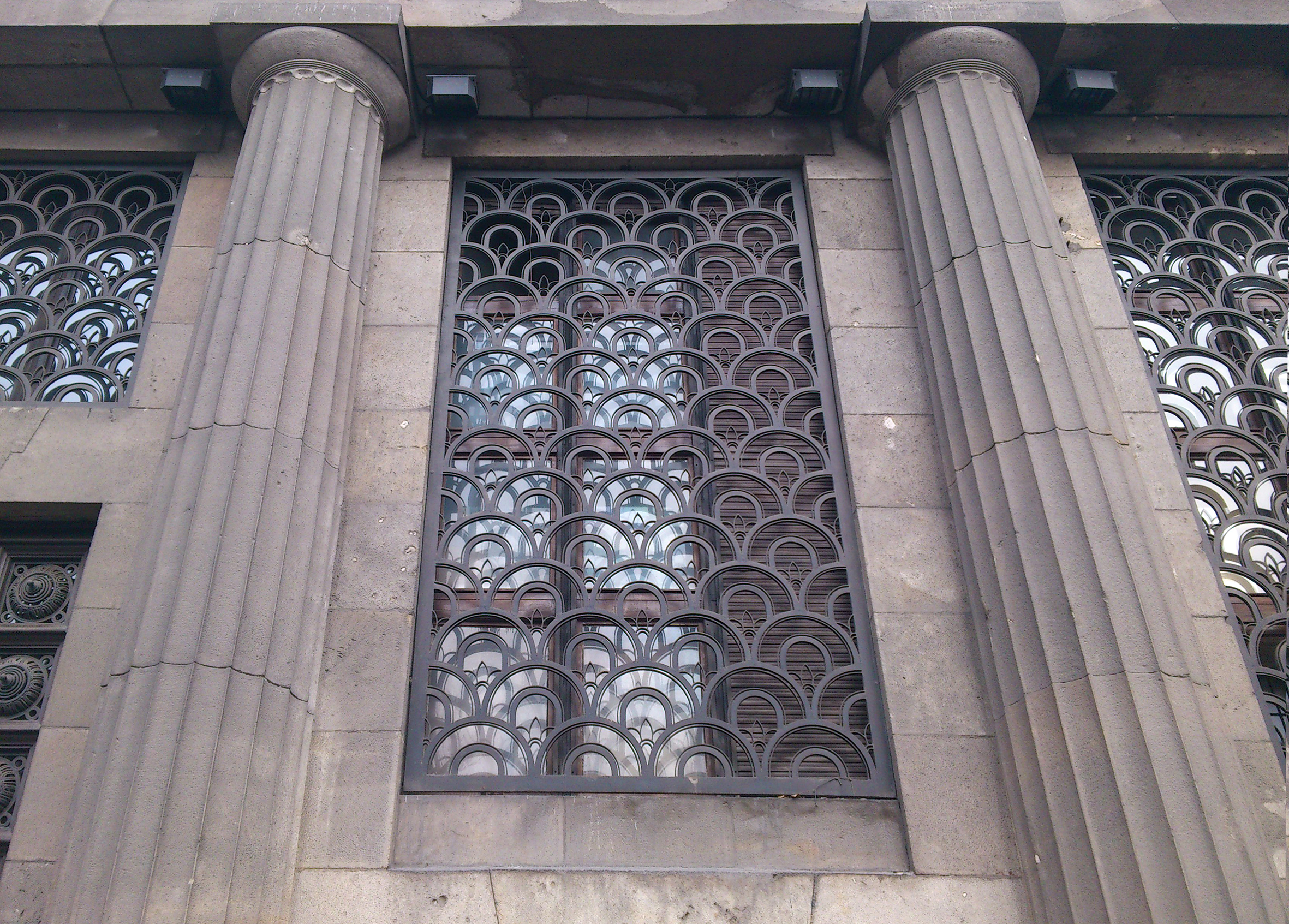
Agrarian Bank Building, detail

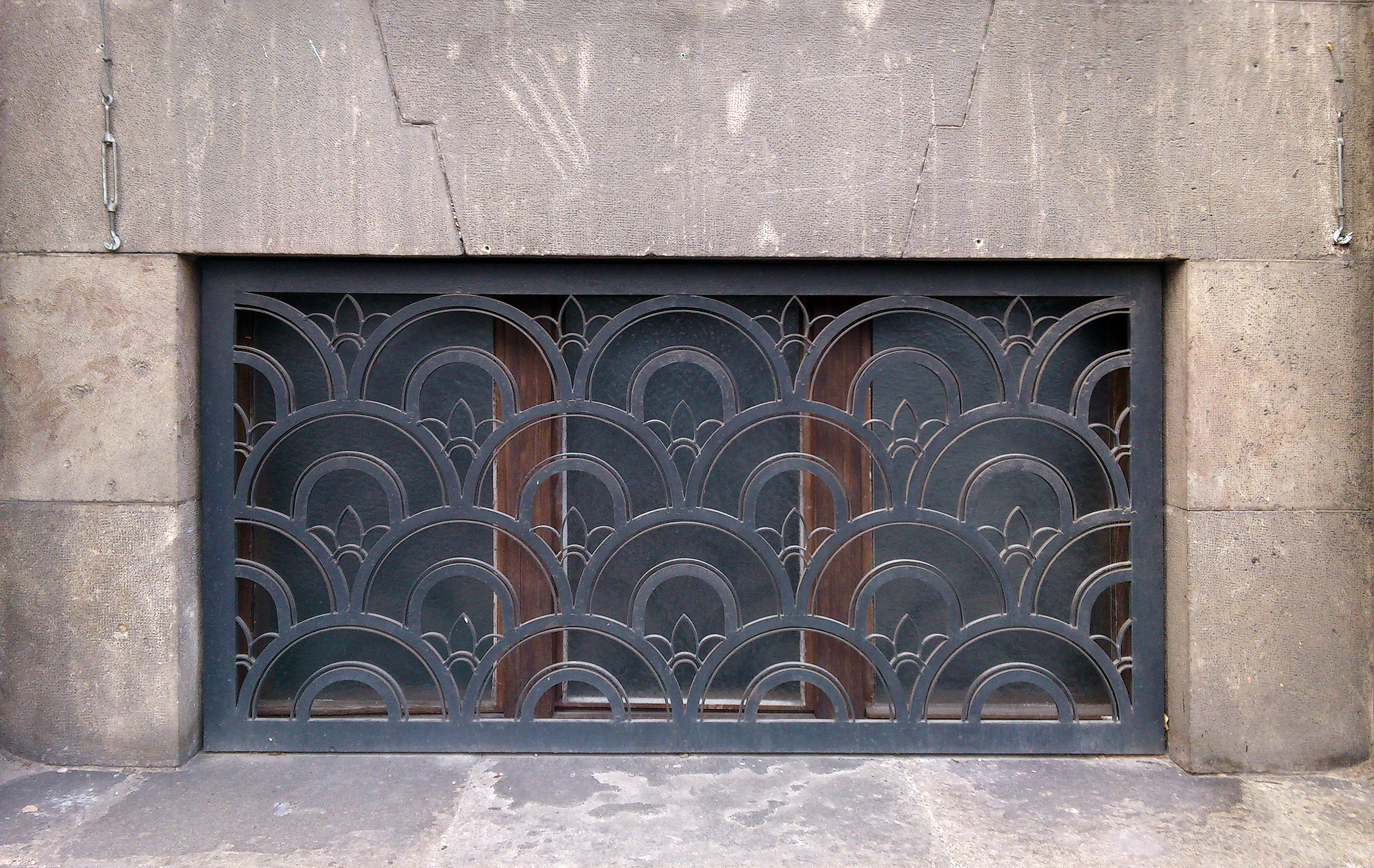
Agrarian Bank Building, detail
