= State Mortgage Bank of Yugoslavia =

Defunct state bank in Serbia and Yugoslavia

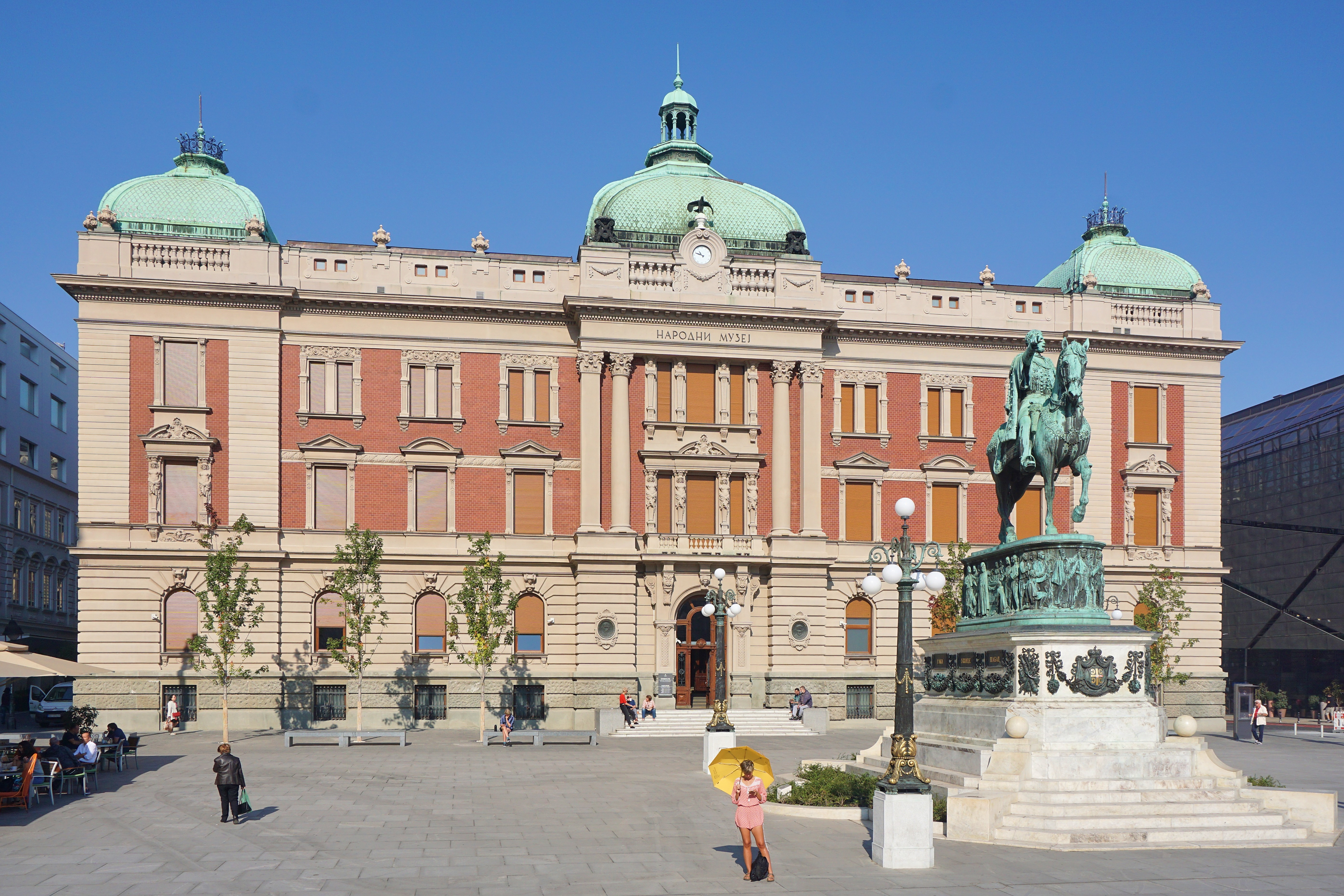
- Former head office building of the Uprava Fondova, then of the State Mortgage Bank in Belgrade (completed in 1903), from 1950 the National Museum
- Formerly: Uprava Fondova
- Company type: State owned company
- Industry: Financial services
- Founded: 1922; 104 years ago in Belgrade Serbia
- Founder: Finance minister Konstantin Cukić
- Defunct: 1946
- Fate: Merged
- Successor: State Investment Bank of Yugoslavia
- Headquarters: Belgrade, Yugoslavia
- Owner: Government of Yugoslavia

The State Mortgage Bank of Yugoslavia (Serbo-Croatian: Državna hipotekarna banka, DHB) was a major state-owned financial institution in the Kingdom of Yugoslavia during the interwar period.

It was established in 1922 to succeed an earlier institution of the Principality then Kingdom of Serbia, the Uprava Fondova (lit. 'Funds Administration') established in Belgrade in 1862. In 1946, the DHB was merged into the State Investment Bank of Yugoslavia.

== History ==
=== Uprava Fondova ===
Finance minister Konstantin Cukić created the Uprava Fondova as the first-ever Serbian credit institution by law signed by Prince Mihailo Obrenović on 16 August 1862, implementing a decision made in late 1858 by the Saint Andrew's Day Assembly. The new institution's first general manager was Milovan Spasić. Its intended purpose was to provide affordable credit to the Serbian peasantry and liberate them from the tutelage of merchant and other intermediaries. In practice, however, the bank's credit mostly went to a limited number of rural and urban landlords who in turn lent at higher interest to the peasants. On 8 July 1898, the Uprava Fondova was reorganized by law as an independent bank, albeit with a state guarantee on its obligations, and allowed to open branches which facilitated access to its credit by less well-to-do borrowers. By the early 20th century, a lot of its lending went to public entities; public bodies also provided the bulk of its liabilities in the form of deposits.

In the early 20th century, the Uprava Fondova expanded together with the Serbian economy and accessed funding from abroad, especially France. It played a pioneering role in creating the Serbian securities market, and participated in the financing of Serbian railroads, power utilities, and of the Serbian government including during the Balkan Wars. By early 1914, it had branches in Šabac, Smederevo, Požarevac, Zaječar, Niš, Kragujevac, Jagodina, Čačak, Užice, and Valjevo.

Like Serbia itself, the Uprava Fondova was severely disrupted during World War I. Following the Great Retreat of the Serbian government and its exile relocation in Corfu, it was re-established there as an auxiiliary of the state treasury in April 1916. Following the success of the Monastir offensive, it was restored as an independent institution. While it had no access to its occupied national turf, the bank was able to make payments such as pensions to refugees in Greece, and paid savings deposits on passbooks issued in Serbia before the withdrawal.

=== State Mortgage Bank (DHB) ===
following the establishment of the Kingdom of Serbs, Croats and Slovenes, new legislation in August 1922 established the State Mortgage Bank, technically registered under its French name Crédit foncier du Royame des Serbes, Croates et Slovenes. This name reflected the exceptionally close France–Yugoslavia relations in the immediate aftermath of World War I and referred to the well-established French Crédit Foncier, whose name had also been adopted by mortgage banks in French colonies: the Crédit foncier colonial (est. 1860) in the French West Indies, Crédit Foncier d'Algérie et de Tunisie (est. 1880) in French North Africa, Crédit Foncier d'Extrême-Orient (est. 1907) in Asia, as well as the Crédit foncier égyptien (est. 1880) in the Sultanate of Egypt.

The DHB had no equity capital but retained earnings that accumulated into a sizeable reserve. It took over the former activities of the Uprava Fondova as well as those of the Serbian Agricultural Bank in Skopje (Serbo-Croatian: Srpska zemljoradnička banka u Skoplju), the State Mortgage Bank of the Kingdom of Montenegro in Cetinje (Serbo-Croatian: Državna hipotekarna banka kraljevine Crne Gore na Cetinju), and the Land Registry of the Kingdom of Dalmatia in Zadar (Serbo-Croatian: Zemljištno vjeresijski zavod kraljevine Dalmacije u Zadru). It became a major player in the financing of construction and infrastructure in interwar Yugoslavia, and also was an active patron of the national arts scene.

From 1922 to 1932, the DHB was the largest bank, not only in Yugoslavia but in all of Southeastern Europe. After 1938, however, it largely stopped providing mortgage loans and focused instead on financing the government. By the end of 1940, it operated in 20 locations across the country in addition to the head office in Belgrade, and was still the leading credit institution in Yugoslavia.

Following the invasion of Yugoslavia in April 1941, the German occupation forces seized the bank's gold reserves and other assets. The bank resumed operations in Serbia in early 1942, mostly to finance the collaborationist government. Its operations in the rest of Yugoslavia were either liquidated or taken over by other institutions, such as a newly formed State Credit Institute in the Independent State of Croatia.

Following the liberation of the country by the Yugoslav Partisans, the bank was reorganized in October 1945 as a provider of long-term directed credit. In August 1946, it was merged into the State Investment Bank. In 1952, the State Investment Bank in turn was merged into the National Bank of Yugoslavia.

=== Legacy ===
The Yugoslav Investment Bank and its successor Investbanka both portrayed themselves as continuating entities of Uprava Fondova and DHB, despite their origin in a 1956 spinoff from the monobank National Bank of Yugoslavia.

The buildings erected by DHB for its branches during the interwar period were generally of high architectural quality and have often been repurposed for prestige use in the successor states of Yugoslavia.

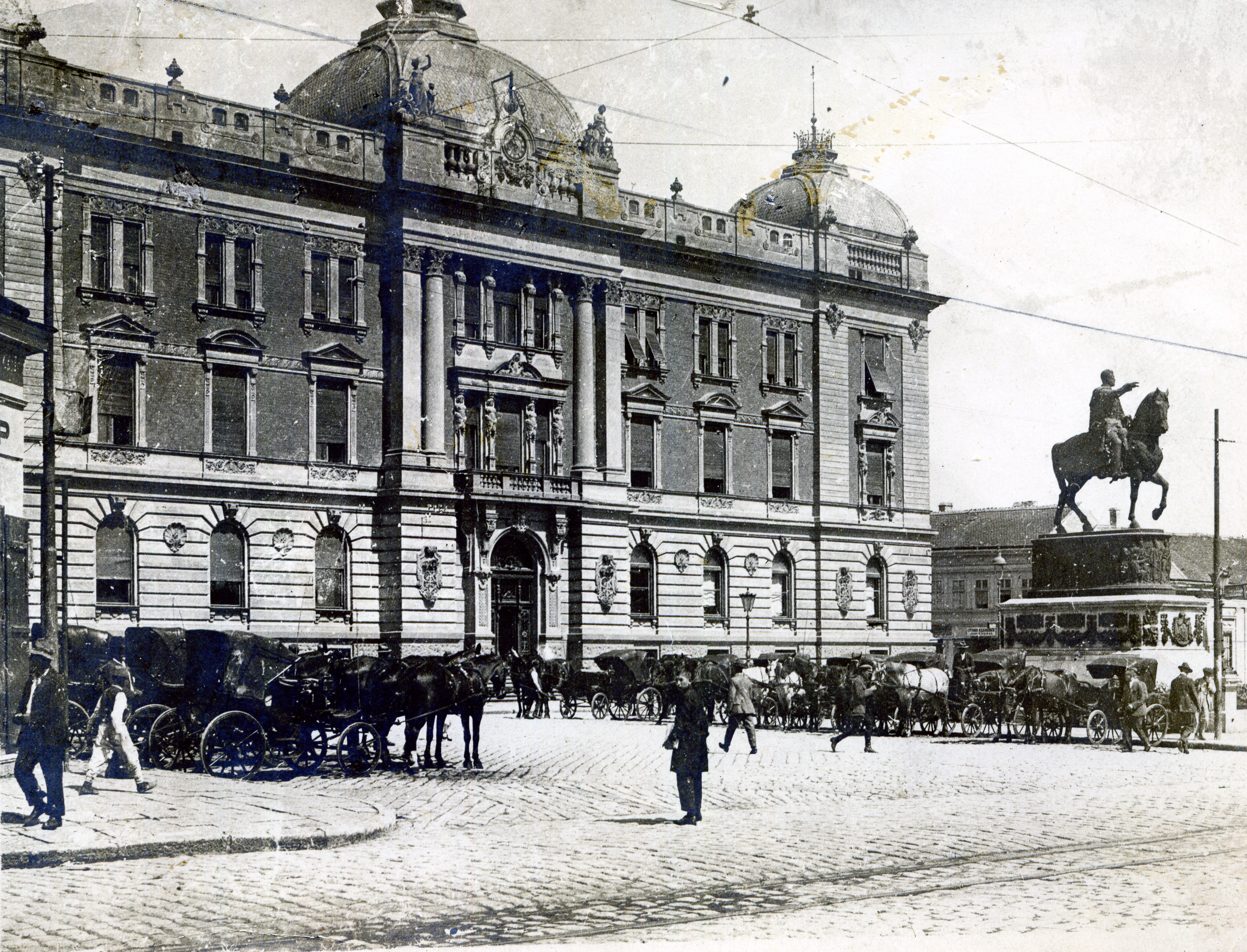
Belgrade head office building photographed in the early 20th century

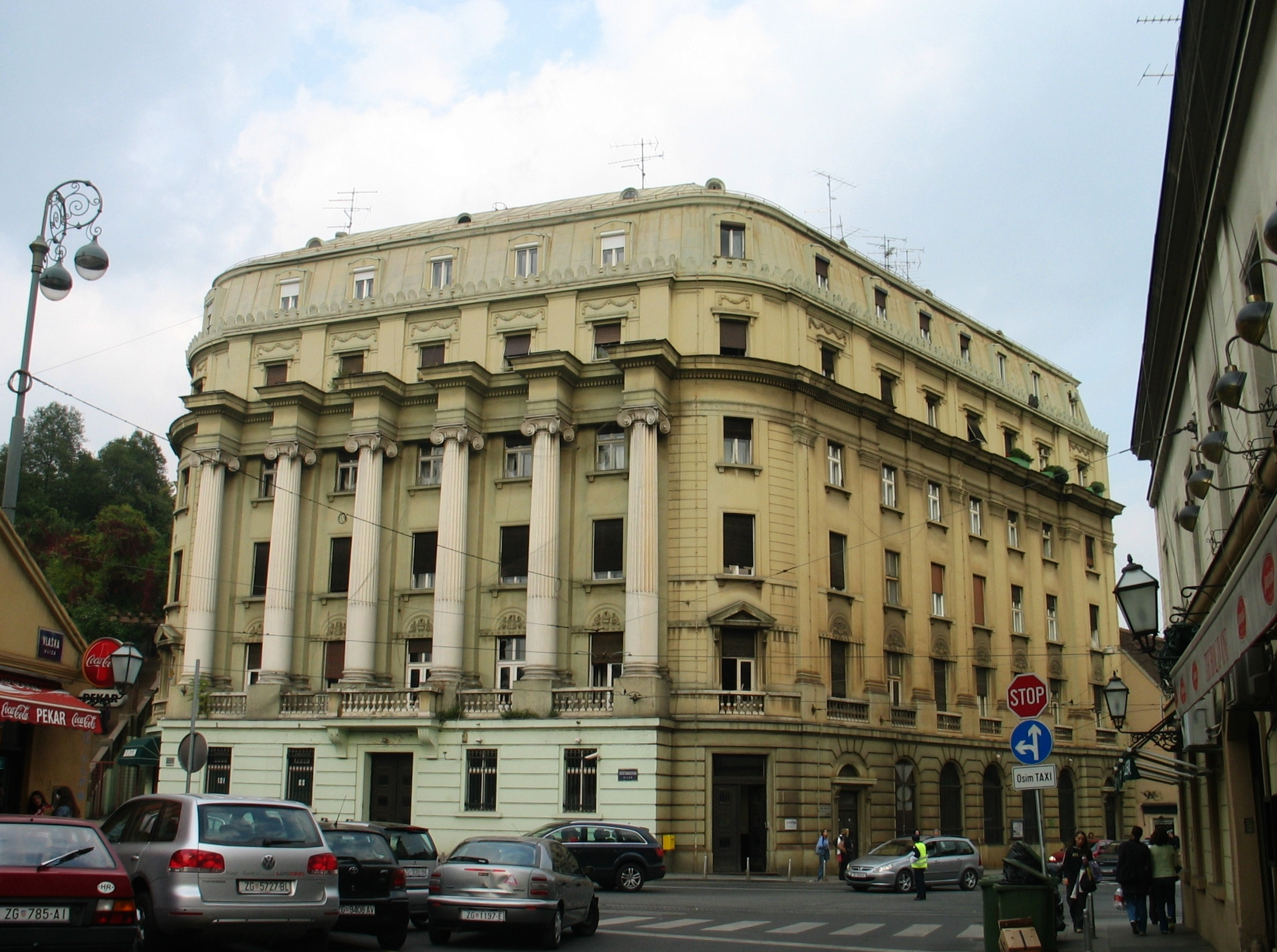
Branch building in Zagreb, the former seat of Slavenska Banka (completed 1923), acquired in 1928

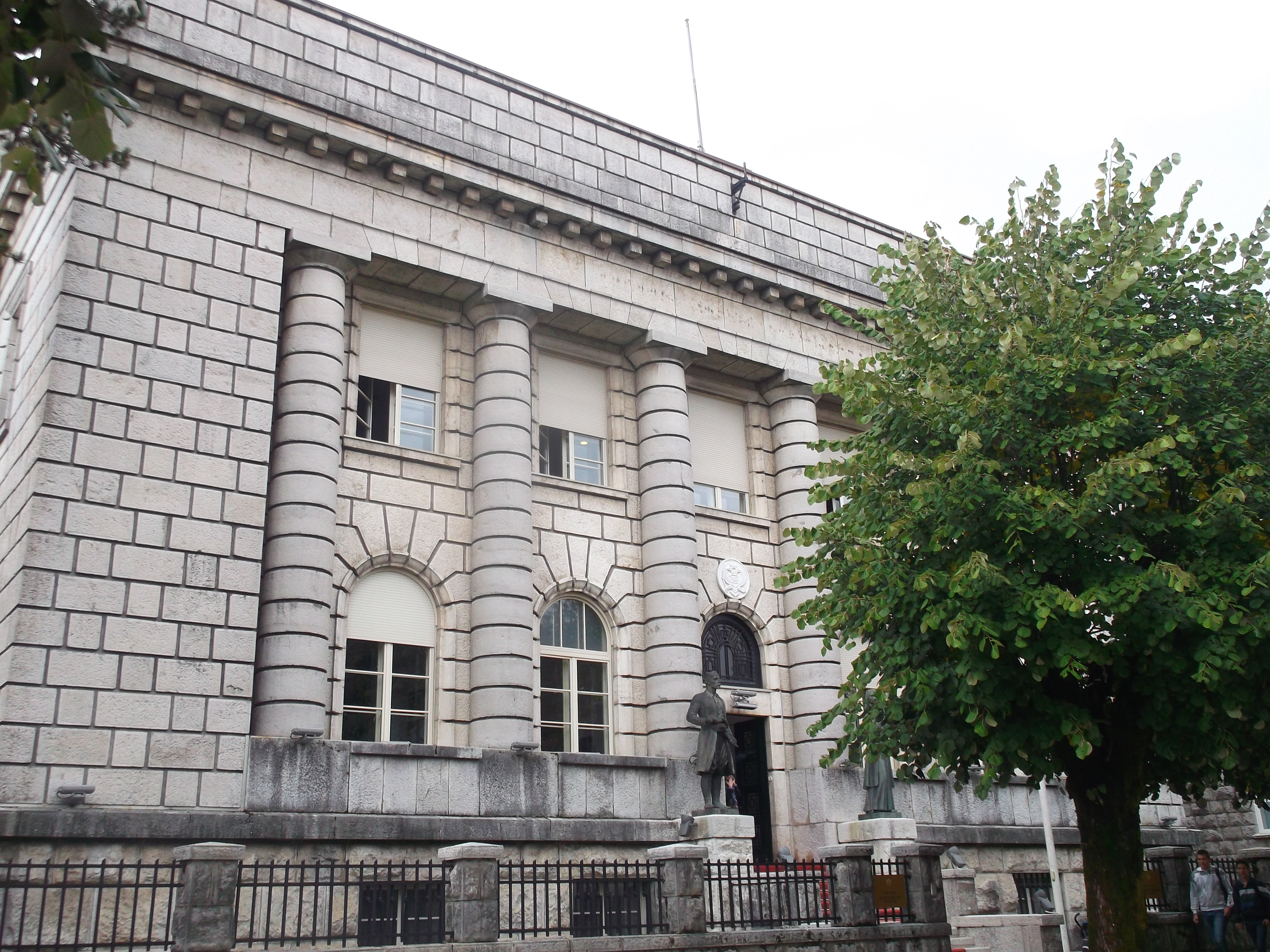
Branch building in Cetinje, later the Ministry of Culture of Montenegro

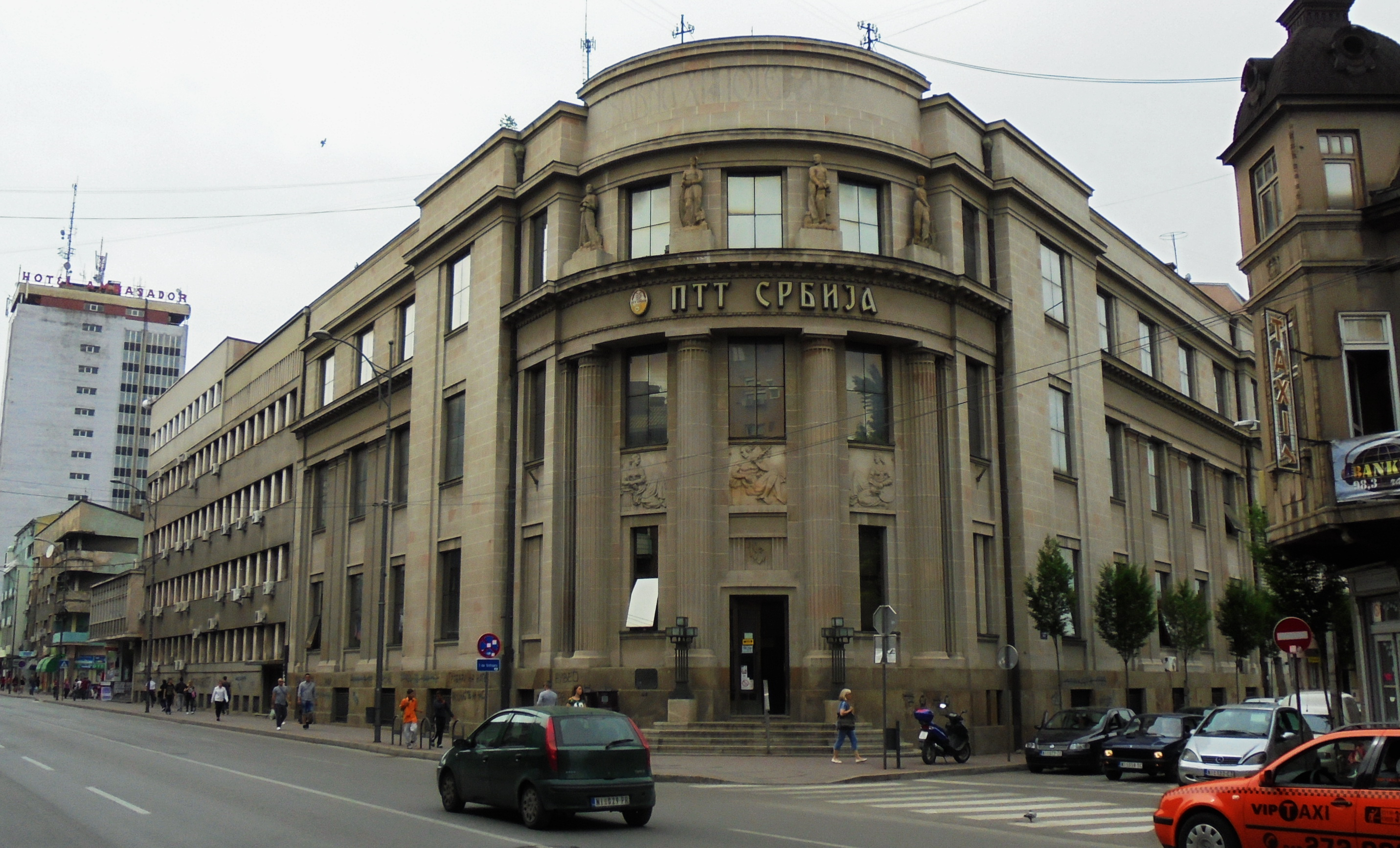
Branch building in Niš (completed 1931), later central post office of Pošta Srbije

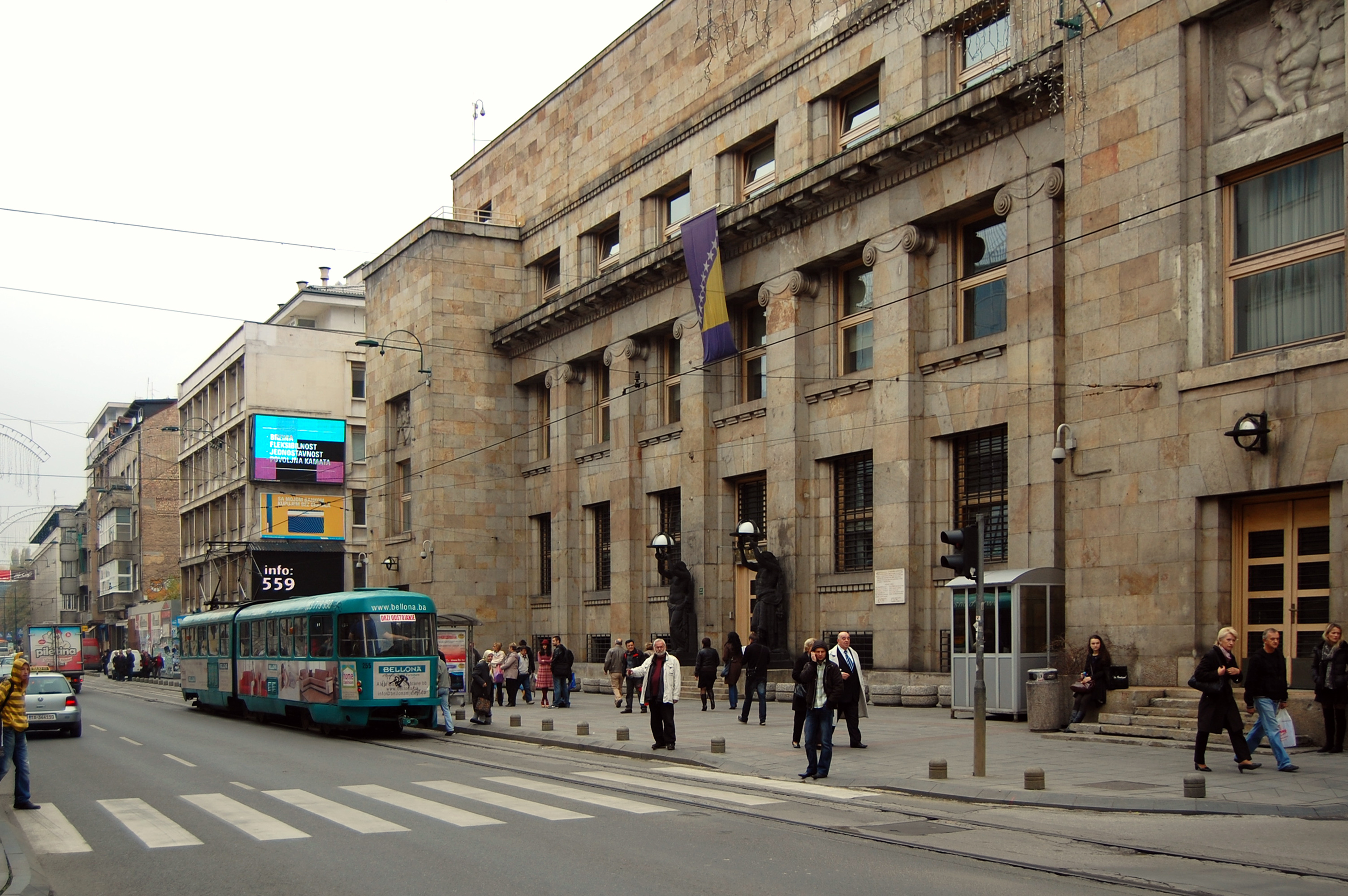
Branch building in Sarajevo (completed 1931), later Central Bank of Bosnia and Herzegovina

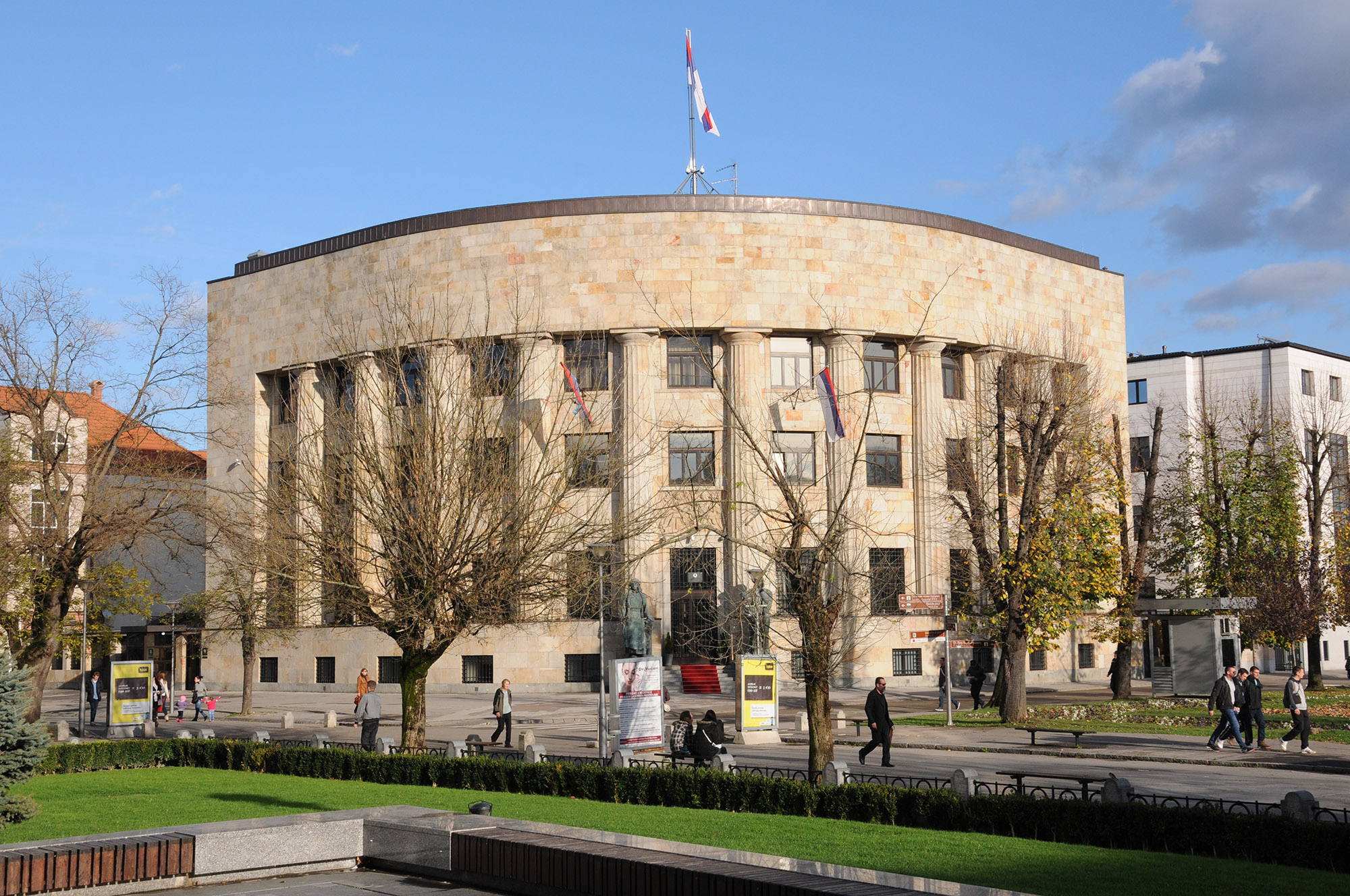
Branch building in Banja Luka (completed 1936), later Palace of the Republic

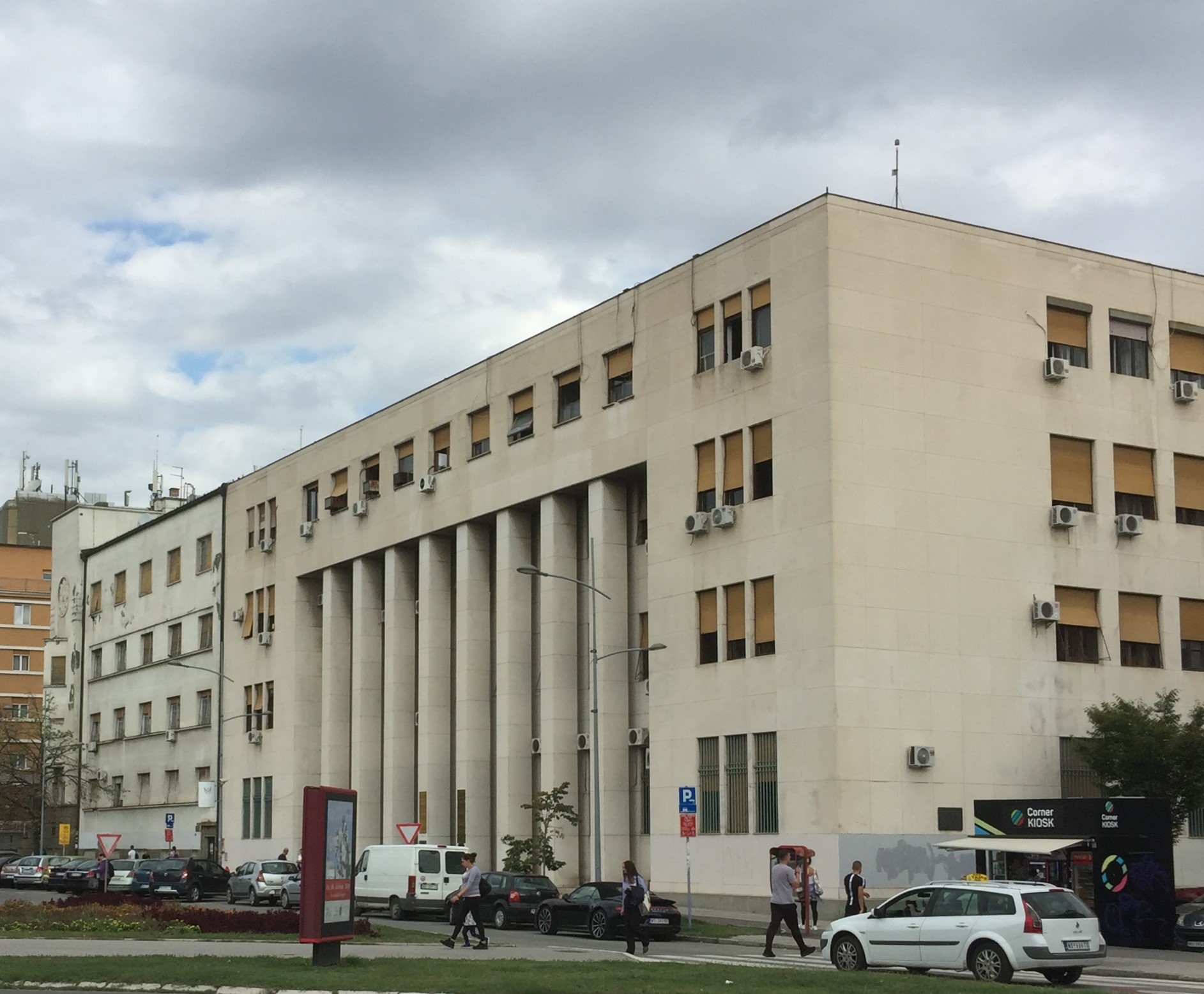
Branch building in Novi Sad, later office of the Tax Service

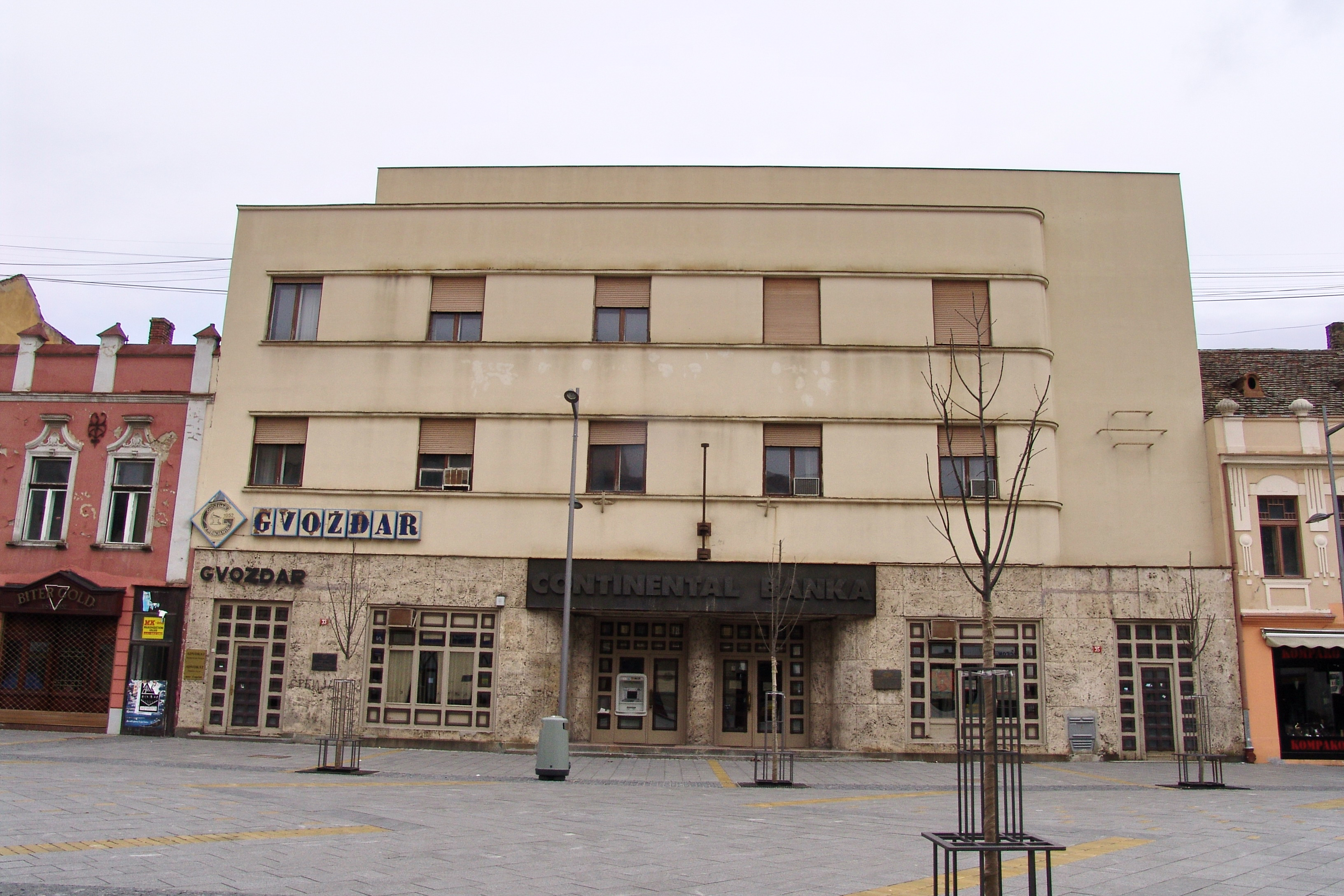
Branch building in Zrenjanin (completed 1937)

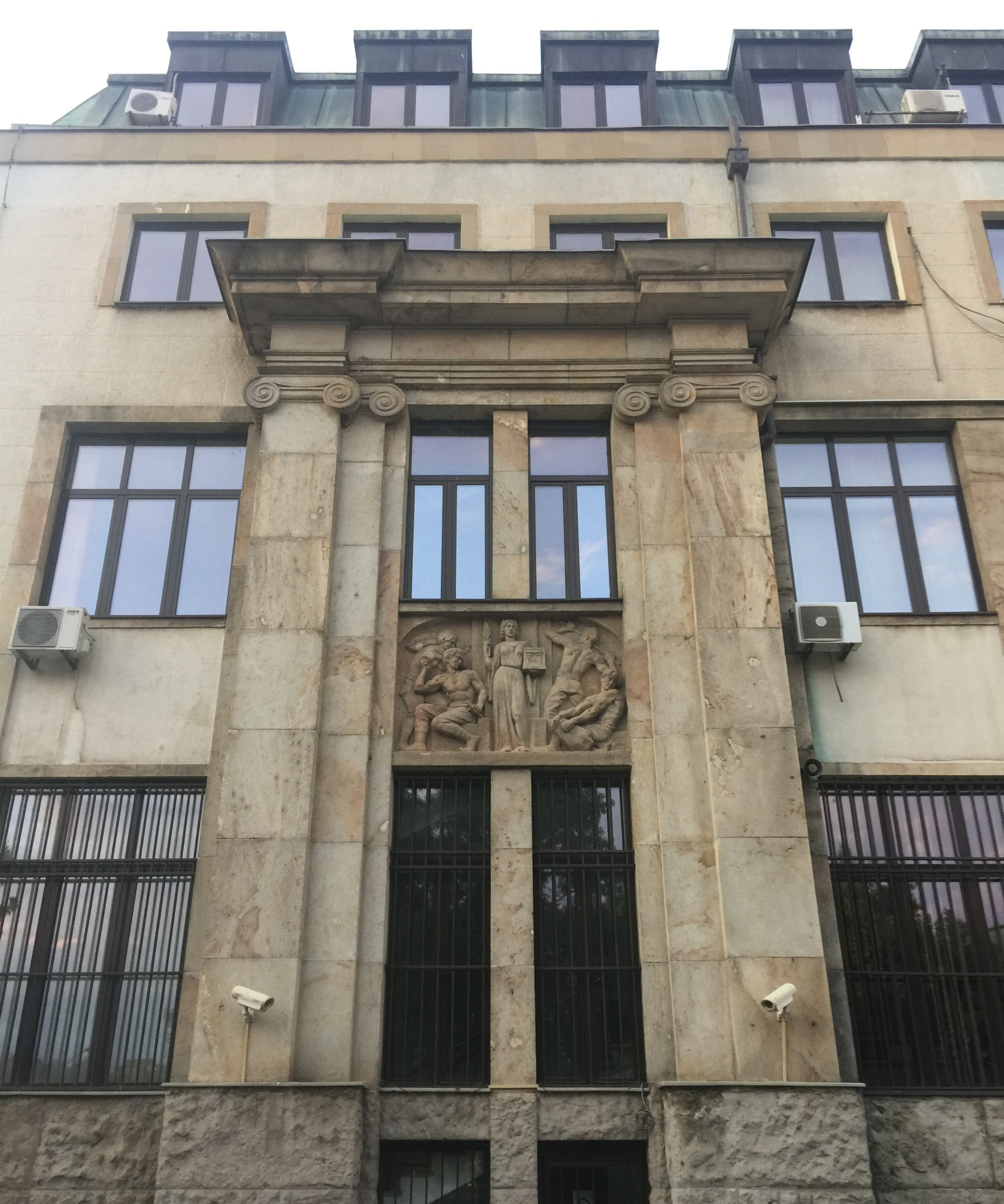
Branch building in Valjevo (completed 1939), later office of the Finance Ministry

== See also ==
- Landesbank für Bosnien und Herzegowina
- Banque Franco-Serbe
- List of banks in Yugoslavia
