= Splitska Banka =

Splitska banka d.d.
- Founded: 1965
- Headquarters: Split, Croatia
- Services: Commercial banking
- Net income: €4.49 mln (2013)
- Total assets: €3584.56 mln (2013)
- Total equity: €444.18 mln (2013)
- Owner: OTP Bank Hungary (OTP Group)
- Website: www.splitskabanka.hr

Splitska banka was a Croatian banking company based in Split, Croatia. It was one of the largest banks in Croatia. On 1 December 2018, it merged into OTP Bank Group.

== History ==
It was established in 1965 in Split, Croatia. In April 2000 it was privatized and bought by UniCredit. In 2002 Bank Austria Creditanstalt AG on base of purchase contracts of Splitska banka initiated the merger of its subsidiary in Croatia, HVB Croatia, focused on larger businesses and private clients and clients of Splitska banka, with emphasis on the "retail" business. The new bank became known as HVB Splitska banka.

On 20 April 2006 HVB Splitska banka was sold to the French group Société Générale, which prompted the bank to change its name to Société Générale - Splitska banka d.d.. On May 2, 2017, OTP banka Hrvatska acquired 100% ownership of Splitska banka.

== See also ==
- List of banks in Yugoslavia
- List of banks in Croatia
