= Single-tier banking system =

Financial framework in Communist economies

A single-tier banking system is a policy framework under which all credit institutions coexist without distinction about the quality of their liabilities, or in other words, there is no distinction between central bank money and broad money. This setting is generally associated with communist economic systems.

An extreme version of single-tier banking system is the monobank system (a term coined by economist George Garvy) in which a single institution centralizes all financial intermediation. The alternative to a single-tier system is a two-tier banking system, in which the central bank is singled out and entrusted with monetary policy, as is presently the case in nearly all of the world's jurisdictions. The move from single-tier to two-tier banking systems has been a key feature of post-communist transitions or, in the case of Yugoslavia, China, Vietnam and Laos, the transition towards market socialism .

References to tiering in the banking sector also exist in other contexts. For example, the Hong Kong Monetary Authority in the 1980s implemented what it calls a three-tier banking system (銀行三級發牌制度) which distinguishes between licensed banks, restricted license banks, and deposit-taking companies. In the European Union, policymakers have referred to the option of a "two tier banking system" in which different supervisory styles apply on account of different risk tolerance thresholds; such an option has been, however, rejected by the European Central Bank in the context of European banking supervision. This is a similar concept to what is generally called "tailoring" in the United States, which came under question following the 2023 United States banking crisis.

== Soviet Union ==
The Soviet Union was the first jurisdiction to implement a single-tier banking system, which took shape as part of the New Economic Policy in the early 1920s following the financial dislocation of the first few years following the Russian Revolution, during which all banks' assets were nationalized and liabilities canceled in late 1917 and banking was declared a state monopoly. From early 1920 to mid-1921, there were no banks at all in operation in Russia. Following the NEP, the Soviet system relied on several specialized financial institutions, which were reorganized in waves of reform following major leadership transitions in 1928-1932, 1955-1959, and 1987-1988:

- The State Bank of the USSR (Gosbank), est. October 1921 as State Bank of the Russian Soviet Federative Socialist Republic, with scope expanded to the whole Soviet Union in 1923;
- the State Labor Savings Banks System of the USSR (Gostrudsberkassy), a monopolistic retail financial institution;
- a succession of long-term promotional credit banks known initially as Prombank, then from 1959 as the Construction Bank of the USSR (Stroybank);
- a cooperative banking system established in 1922, that became increasingly centralized and was eventually abolished in 1956;
- the Foreign Trade Bank of the USSR (Vneshtorgbank), for foreign trade.

Under Perestroika, the Soviet Union initiated a transition towards a two-tiered system. On 1 January 1988, the Construction Bank of the USSR was reorganized into three entities and the Foreign Trade Bank and Savings Banks were rebranded, resulting in five specialized banks known as spetsbanki that coexisted with the Gosbank, without however changing the underlying mechanisms of the monobank system. Also in 1988, a number of new cooperative banks were licensed starting from August 1988, the first being Soyuz-Bank in Shymkent (now in Kazakhstan) followed by Patent Bank in Leningrad. In September 1988, Tartu Commercial Bank was licensed as the USSR's first commercial bank. A genuine two-tier system started emerging in a chaotic way in 1990-1991.

== Czechoslovakia ==
On 1 July 1950, the National Bank of Czechoslovakia was fully nationalized and renamed the State Bank of Czechoslovakia. Under communism, the role of the State Bank expanded to that of a commercial bank, central bank, and investment bank. The institution was a supervisory agent of the government, in charge of planning for the economic needs of the country. The State Bank granted credit to the individuals that needed capital to meet their business's economic expectations. It also acted as the supervisor of the other state-owned banks, including two savings bank and the Commercial Bank of Czechoslovakia which was in charge of foreign currency exchange. In 1958, the State Bank took control over all capital allocation.

== Hungary ==
Following the Communist takeover and formation of the Hungarian People's Republic in 1949, the former operations of all Hungarian banks were consolidated into a single-tier banking system with four main financial institutions, namely the Hungarian National Bank, the Hungarian National Savings Bank Company, the Hungarian Investment Bank (renamed the State Bank for Development in 1972 and liquidated in 1987), and the Hungarian Foreign Trade Bank. Under that system, the MNB had no independence from the Hungarian state and also engaged in commercial banking activities. A two-tier banking system that focused the MNB on a monetary policy role was eventually re-introduced on 1 January 1987. This made Hungary the first full Comecon member country to move away from the single-tier system.

== Yugoslavia ==
The era of the Socialist Federal Republic of Yugoslavia was marked by frequent financial sector reforms even as the entire sector was continuously state-owned. In 1945, the Communist authorities created six state regional banks in the newly established republics. On 12 October 1946, a government decree formally established the National Bank of the Federative People's Republic of Yugoslavia. Starting around that time, all existing banks were liquidated and their preserved operations taken over by the National Bank or by the State Investment Bank of Yugoslavia, which in turn was merged into the National Bank in 1952. From 1952 to 1955, Yugoslavia exhibited a pure monobank system in which the National Bank was the single financial intermediary for the entire country.

From 1955, the monobank framework was softened with the re-establishment of communal (local) banks and of specialized banks, charting a path back to a two-tier system. The latter included the Yugoslav Bank for Foreign Trade (1955, later known as Jugobanka), Yugoslav Investment Bank (1956, later known as Investbanka), and Yugoslav Agricultural Bank (1958), complemented in 1978 with the Yugoslav Bank for International Economic Cooperation. In 1961–1962, "regional banks" were established in each of the country's six Republics. More freedom to create investment banks and commercial banks was introduced in 1965, further eroding the overwhelming dominance of the National Bank. As a consequence, many new banks were formed in the 1960s and 1970s, including non-depository "internal banks" (financial arms of companies and other public bodies) and depository "basic banks". Among these, Beobanka and Beogradska Banka became the system's dominant banks together with Jugobanka and Investbanka, but all would have had to be liquidated in 2002 after they were found insolvent together with 80 percent of what then remained of the Yugoslav banking sector.

== See also ==
- Deutsche Notenbank in the GDR
- Liu Hongru
