= Société Générale Srbija =

Serbian banking and financial services company

- Type: Joint-stock company
- Industry: Finance and Insurance
- Predecessor: Société Générale Yugoslav Bank (1977–2007); Société Générale Srbija (2007–2019)
- Founded: 1991 (last form); 1977 (founded)
- Defunct: 30 April 2021
- Headquarters: Belgrade, Serbia
- Area served: Serbia
- Products: Commercial banking, Investment banking
- Revenue: ▼€110.72 million (2019)
- Net income: ▼€33.90 million (2019)
- Total assets: ▲€2.965 billion (2019)
- Total equity: ▲€432.83 million (2019)
- Owner: OTP Bank (100%)
- Number of employees: 1,405 (2019)

Société Générale Srbija was a commercial bank with headquarters in Belgrade, Serbia. It was taken over by OTP Bank in September 2019 and subsequently merged together with Vojvođanska Banka, a wholly owned subsidiary of OTP Bank, forming OTP Banka Srbija in May 2021.

== History ==
In 1977, Paris-based Société Générale established a representative office in Belgrade, SFR Yugoslavia. On 12 February 1991, Société Générale Yugoslav Bank was founded as the first bank with foreign capital to be established in former FR Yugoslavia. The bank was a joint venture between Société Générale (75%), and the now defunct Beogradska Banka (20%) and Banque Franco-Yougoslave (5%). At first, it was established as a unit of SG Corporate & Investment Banking, and provided services to corporate customers only.

In 2001, it became a full-service universal bank, providing services to both corporate clients and individuals. It was only in late 2007 that the bank changed name to Société Générale Srbija in order to reflect the name change of the country it operates in (FR Yugoslavia was renamed to Serbia and Montenegro in 2003, and Serbia became independent in 2006).

In 2014, Société Générale Srbija bought KBC banka's portfolio, while Telenor Serbia bought the KBC banka itself, creating Telenor banka. In December 2017, Société Générale Srbija took housing and cash loans to citizens, as well as credit card debt, from the Jubanka, which was bought by the Serbian AIK Banka in April 2017.

In September 2019, the Hungarian OTP Bank bought Société Générale Srbija after the agreement was made in December 2018, and the process of integration with Vojvođanska banka a.d. is planned to be finalized in 2021. On 25 September 2019, Société Générale Srbija a.d. changed its name into OTP banka Srbija a.d. with headquarters in Belgrade.

== Market and financial data ==
According to 2019 consolidated financial report submitted to Serbian Business Register Agency, the bank has 1,405 employees and it posted an annual profit of €33.90 million for the calendar year 2019.

== See also ==
- List of banks in Yugoslavia
- List of banks in Serbia
