= Veran Matić =

Serbian media manager (born 1962)

- Веран Матић
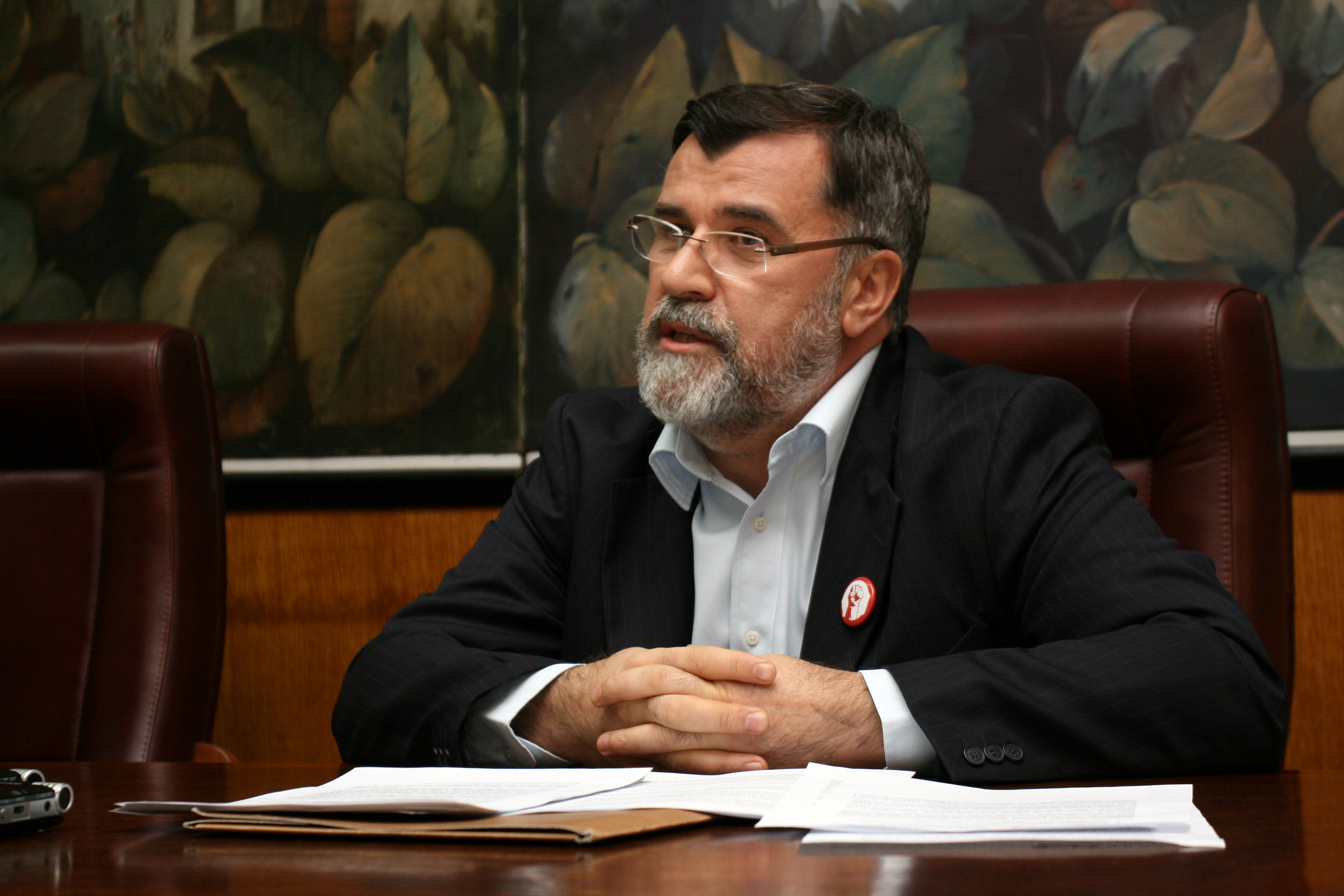
- Matić in 2011
- Born: 1962 (age 63–64); Šabac, PR Serbia, Yugoslavia
- Education: University of Belgrade
- Occupation: Media manager
- Organization: B92

Veran Matić (Serbian Cyrillic: Веран Матић; born May 19, 1962) is a Serbian media manager who was the CEO of RTV B92 from its establishment in 2004 in its current form until 2019.

He is also the chairman of the commission for investigating killings of journalists established in February 2013 on his initiative and supported by the Government of Serbia.

In 1993, he was awarded a CPJ International Press Freedom Award by the US-based Committee to Protect Journalists, and in 2000, the Austria-based International Press Institute named him one of its fifty World Press Freedom Heroes of the last fifty years.

== Career ==
Matić graduated from the University of Belgrade with a degree in world literature. He first became involved in independent youth media in 1984, and in May 1989, co-founded the independent radio station B92 with Sasa Mirkovic. The station broadcast a mix of music and current affairs coverage, particularly criticism of President Slobodan Milosevic. The Yugoslav government took various actions to hinder or ban the station from broadcasting, described by BBC News as "ranging from jamming, technical problems or the allocation of frequencies". In November 1996, B92 was briefly banned from broadcasting, but responded by making its audio available through the Internet.

Though an opponent of the Slobodan Milošević government, Matić also opposed the 1999 NATO bombing of Yugoslavia. In late March, he published a statement on B92's website titled "Bombing the Baby with the Bath Water", in which he stated that "NATO is fulfilling its own prophecy of doom: each missile that hits the ground exacerbates the humanitarian disaster that NATO is supposed to be preventing." The Milosevic government banned the station from broadcasting for a few hours later in the same week, stating that its transmission strength had exceeded the permitted level. Matić was taken in for questioning, while B92 staff were ordered not to use their phones or computers. B92 staff responded that "The real reason they had to shut us down is because we were informing people about what is going on", and the station continued to broadcast live via satellite and internet, defying written government orders.

On 2 April, station management was transferred to Milosevic's Socialist Party of Serbia by a Belgrade court. When B92 journalists refused to cooperate with the new management, they were fired. Matić began a new independent station under the name B2-92.

In March 2019, Matić resigned from the CEO position of RTV B92, a month after an ownership change of the company.

== Awards and recognition ==
Matić won the CPJ International Press Freedom Award of the New York-based Committee to Protect Journalists in 1993. Five years later, he was selected along with Senad Pećanin and Viktor Ivančić to receive the Olof Palme Prize on behalf of "Independent media in former Yugoslavia".

In 2000, the International Press Institute selected Matić as one of fifty World Press Freedom Heroes of the previous fifty years. The award citation praised him and the B92 staff for having been able to "provide an accurate, impartial view of the tragic events occurring in their region while standing up to constant pressure from the Serbian authorities". The French government awarded him its Legion of Honour in 2009, calling him a "humanist, an outstanding journalist and a fighter for the freedom of the press".

In 2011, readers of the Serbian magazine Hello named Matić the "most humane celebrity" of the year for his work with the B92 Fund. In the past year, the fund had supported several soup kitchens and advocated for incubators in Serbian hospitals, a campaign it called "Battle for the Babies".

In November 2012, Veran Matic won the Press Vitez Lifetime Achievement Award for his great contribution to the development of television and investigative reporting in Serbia.

In December 2012, the Serbian Association of Managers awarded Matić as best manager, in part for his involvement in the humanitarian project Battle for Babies. In the same month, Matić won the UEPS Dragan Sakan – New Idea award.

In February 2013, Veran Matic was awarded the Sretenje Medal of honor of the third class, one of the highest national recognitions, "for carrying out social humanitarian campaign 'Battle for the Babies' that contributed to the general welfare of the citizens of the Republic of Serbia".

In March 2015, Veran Matic was awarded with the VIRTUS Special Award for the exquisite contribution to the development of philanthropy in Serbia.

== Publishing activities ==
- Co-editor of the book with Dejan Ilić - Truths, Responsibilities, Reconciliations: The Example of Serbia (Dejan Ilic and Veran Matic, ed., Beograd: Samizdat B92, 2000)
- Veran Matic's articles have appeared in The New York Times, the New York Book Review, The Wall Street Journal, Index on Censorship, Frankfurter Allgemeine Zeitung, Le Monde, The Nation, and elsewhere.
- Co-author: Shaping the Network Society, edited by Douglas Schuler and Peter Day - chapter 8, Civil Networking in a Hostile Environment: Experiences in the Former Yugoslavia
- Author: KUNSTRADIO - Schaffung des lnformationsraums: "Commando Solo"
