= Dragan Sakan =

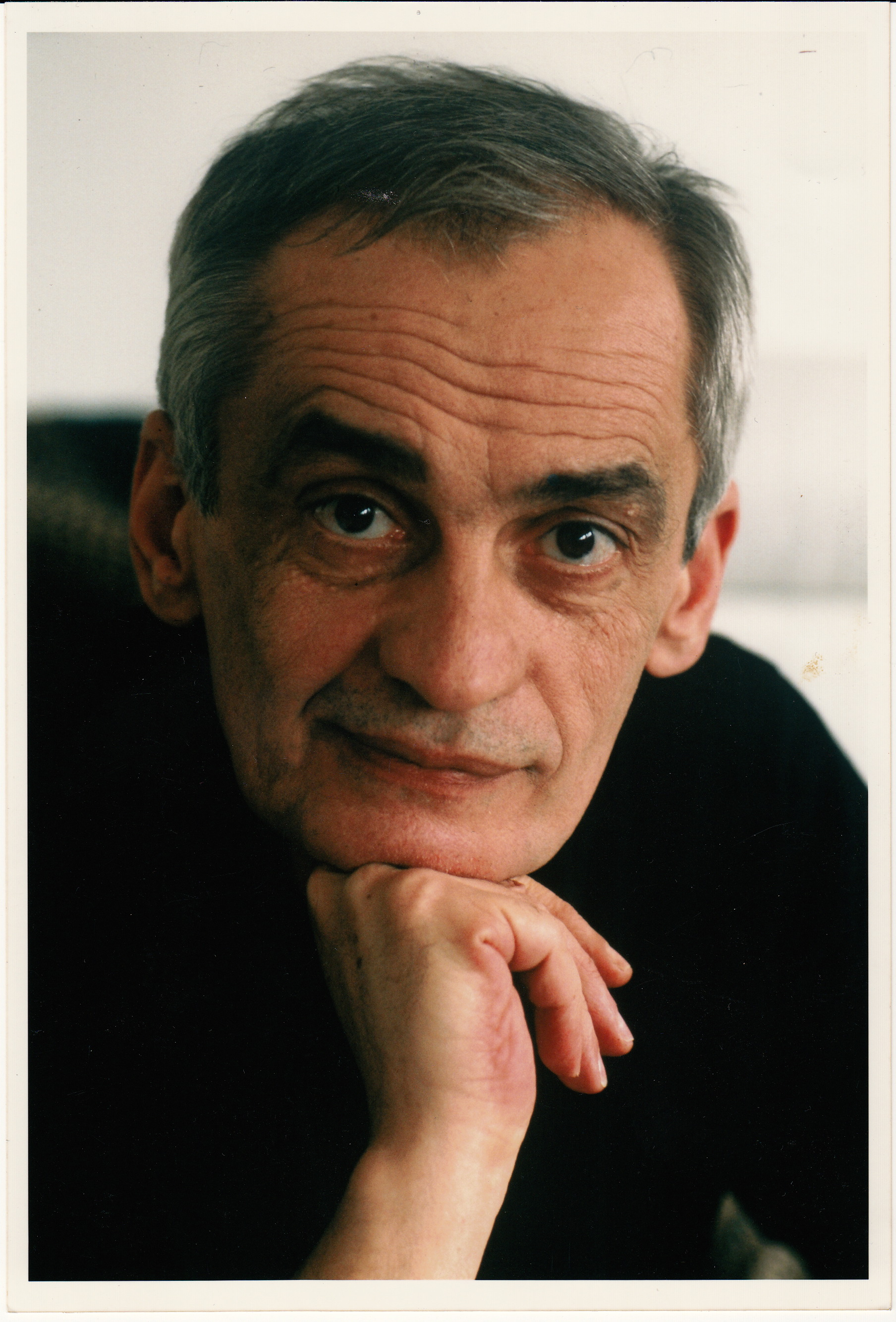
- Born: 19 July 1950
- Died: 3 October 2010 (aged 60)
- Occupations: Founder and creative director of the advertising agency New Moment

Dragan Sakan (19 July 1950 – 3 October 2010), was an advertising pioneer of Serbia and other countries in the region. The magazine Advertising Age, Washington described him as "almost a mythical figure... The man who transformed propaganda into advertising in the region".

He was a founder of the advertising agency New Moment New Ideas Company, one of the most awarded agencies in the Balkans, today led by his sons, Žarko Sakan and Lazar Sakan.

He introduced international standards in the field of advertising and design and was one of the first copywriters and creative directors in Eastern and Central Europe. Sakan was a president and a member of numerous advertising festival juries both in Europe and worldwide; a regular jury member of Cresta – IAA, New York Festivals, Epica Awards, and a member of The Advertising Club of New York.

He was a creator and a producer of many projects in various domains of human spirit expression – Council for New Thinking, BeogrAD festival, Art Director Club Serbia, New Moment magazine for art and advertising, New Moment Ideas Gallery, Ideas Campus (European School of Ideas, New Moment) and was also an honorary partner of Edward de Bono in the World Innovation Museum Project.

Several books talk about Dragan Sakan – Kako smo uspjeli: 13 legendi jugoslovenskog biznisa (How We Succeeded: 13 Legends of Yugoslav Business), Najsvetliji duhovi Srbije (The Brightest Spirits of Serbia), Kultni likovi Beograda (The Iconic Figures of Belgrade), Ko je ko u Srbiji (Who is Who in Serbia).

He is the author of three books – Pretty Woman (1996), New Communication (2005), New Idea Woman – My Profession is Dragan Sakan (2010).

== Biography ==
Dragan Sakan, a psychologist by vocation, entered the world of advertising in 1975, first as its ardent critic soon to become the first who affirmatively wrote about market and advertising. Instead of remaining a critic, he turned into an ad lover and from that moment on his life started to resemble an artistic commercial. He turned his dreams into slogans bringing them into reality just like he did in his advertisements.

At the time Dragan Sakan was a graduate at the Faculty of Philosophy, University of Belgrade, professor Ivan Štajnberger, PhD invited him to participate in the project of launching new ice-cream flavours of the multinational company Unilever in the Belgrade market (Unilever and Pekabeta formed Frikom company). This collaboration resulted in new catchy names of several ice-cream types – Hladiša (Coolio), Rumenko (Ruddy), Čoko Moko (Choco Moco), Cmok (Smack), Leni (Hazely), and several years later appeared Čašavko (Cupcase).

Owing to his participation in the project Pekabela in 1976 he was asked to take the place of a researcher in the newly established Marketing Agency, a department of the Institute for Scientific Research of the largest food production company PKB in ex-Yugoslavia.

Since at that time there were no consumer inquiry and survey sampling methods and techniques, Dragan was a pioneer in the field and the one who introduced and tested them setting the standards. He established the Name test, Product test, Experimental image research, Market segmentation strategy, Projective methods in motivational research, Campaign pre-testing techniques, Consumer and Public opinion surveys, etc. all of which were presented in numerous scientific works. In this way he implemented psychology in the field of marketing which influenced both professional public circles and clients.

Due to his personal and professional criteria in 1981 he resigned from his permanent job and founded an independent research team that carried out nearly all consumer inquiries and public opinion surveys that existed at the time.

Branislav Novčić, the director of the Agency for economic propaganda in the newspaper publisher Borba invited Dragan Sakan to establish an independent agency that would provide all-inclusive advertising services. In that way Dragan Sakan became a founder and a chief executive of the Marketing Centre at the agency Borba. There he encountered Mirjana Pejovic – The Aunt, who would become and remain his lifelong support.

At first his agency in Borba was operating as a "one-man band" concept – he was the only one who did the job of a researcher, planner, concept designer, creative team leader simultaneously handling all the clients. He invited respected directors, writers and various artists to join his team, among which were Goran Marković, Srđan Karanović, Boris Miljković, Dragoslav Andrić, Dušan Petričić, Nebojša Đukelić, Zoran Simjanović, Veljko Bikić, Bata Vranešević, etc. Some of his clients were: Beobanka, Wrangler, Jaka – kozmetika, 1984 Sarajevo Olympic Games, Simod, JIK banka, Komunist, etc.

Dragan Sakan carried out the campaigns in other media as well, not only those concerning newspaper publisher Borba. By the end of 1985 the agency won 15 awards at the festival in Portorož, surpassing the Studio Marketing Delo. On that occasion he was pronounced Creative Person of the Year, and the very next Propagandist of the Year.

Soon after Studio Marketing from Ljubljana invited him to take the position of a creative director and form his own team of creative people, professionals and associates based in Belgrade. The opening of the Studio Marketing Delo – Belgrade was accompanied by huge media attention.

The next year at the festival in Portorož he presented both his campaign for Beobanka, which he did for the agency Studio Marketing Delo from Ljubljana and the campaign for Ljubljanska Banka, a project of his agency Borba from Belgrade. Both campaigns, both agencies as well as both banks got the Golden Idea award.

He created the witty campaign "Citizens, I make a public appeal, I’ve got issues with my wife" for the tool manufacturer Unior Zreče. For this occasion he invited Radivoje Lola Đukić, a legendary Yugoslav satirist, who chose his favourite actors Đokica Milaković and Mija Aleksić for the campaign. That was the first time that actors took part in an advertising campaign.

Throughout the four years of its activities, Studio Marketing Delo – Belgrade brought about the revolution in the field of video ad making, winning remarkable local and international acknowledgements. During that period numerous famous projects were done: the posters for Youth Day, sales ads for Obuća Beograd, Žvazbuka (Gumphabet), Beobanka, BIP, Sintelon, as well as the ads for EI Niš (with the main slogan "Let the child be a Man") which won the Golden Rose award at the festival in Portorož in 1987. They also ran a significant number of social and charity work, such as event marketing for the tennis match between Boba Živojinović and Boris Becker, at which occasion all the proceeds went to children without parental care, the campaign "The actor and his fate", marketing promotion for the monastery Prohor Pčinjski, the campaigns for The October Salon, Petnica Science Center, RTV Studio B, Homer – the Association of the Blind, Cetinje Biennial, Babka Ethno Centre, BITEF, Anti AIDS Found, the theatre Atelje 212, etc.

Some of the last campaigns before the breaking of the war in Yugoslavia were those for Florami Mostar with the slogan "Make love, not war", and for Radenska for which the slogan was "Radenska connects us" as well as the campaign for the black candies Negro – "The devil is not as black as he is painted. He's even blacker.".

The very same year, Dragan Sakan, who was in public informally known as "the king of slogans" created the following slogans for the Association of Managers of Belgrade: "Companies die – life disappears" and "Thank you past, let’s move on!"

Some of his most prominent slogans are still remembered today: "Society requires fundamental changes" (Sintelon), "Val-val-valera ..." (Jaka, Radoviš), "Fragile and worthwhile" (Jaka, Radoviš), "The nature has been trapped, may the straw be apt" (PKB), "The Japanese, tiny and big" (Mazda), "I know of a sweeter side of the World, that’s the side of love" (Banini), "The mason of Belgrade" (Beobanka), "Tighten me gently" (Jaka, Radoviš), "It may look funny, but my back doesn't hurt any more" (Kosmodisk), "Equation with the knowns" (the theatre Atelje 212), "Let all your senses enjoy" (29. Novembar), "PEKABETA – a home budget Fayetta", "Good morning, neighbour" (PKB), "Stickman, Stickman – a wonder of the biscuit can" (Crnagoracoop), "I don’t want a pinky, give me Mr. Thinky" (Milan Blagojević, Smederevo).

At the beginning of the war in the region (1990) and the disintegration of the old Yugoslavia, Dragan Sakan was among the few who realized that the era of early capitalism was coming and that the old system was not going to survive. He therefore created a holding company with the agencies in Belgrade, Zagreb, Ljubljana, Skopje, Sarajevo, Sofia, Banja Luka and Tirana. He became a majority owner of the largest agency in Yugoslavia – S Team Bates Saatchi & Saatchi and a member of Saatchi & Saatchi European creative board. He was an ever-present member of the juries from all over the world in the field of advertising and design. His clients at that time were: P&G, Coca-Cola, Mazda, Floramy, Jugoplastika, Beo Zoo Vrt (Belgrade Zoo), Robne kuce Beograd, C market, Pekabeta, Naftna Industrija Srbije (Petroleum Industry of Serbia), British Airways, DHL, Gallina Blanca, Hewlett Packard, Hyundai, Interbrew, Johnson & Johnson, Kombinat Sport, Kosmodisk, Jazz Festival Skopje, Jutel, Kikindski mlin, Banini, Hiram Walker, the Ministry for Privatization of the Republic of Macedonia, etc.

At that time, he was also creating a large number of non-profit campaigns for the following institutions and organizations: The Red Cross of Serbia, Commissariat for Refugees, The International Red Cross, The Red Cross of Yugoslavia, The Ministry of Culture of the Republic of Serbia, The Ministry of Culture of the Republic of Macedonia, The Circle of Serbian Sisters, Little Montmartre, Belgrade Zoo, Tourist Organization of Portorož, Tourist Organization of Belgrade, Tourist Organization of Serbia, BITEF, Belef, Miroslav Gospel Project for the National Museum of Serbia, etc.

During the late 90s Dragan Sakan spent a lot of time in Piran, a Renaissance town in Slovenia, dreaming of civilization in which artists and creative people would be more important than politicians. Since 2000 The European School of Ideas – Ideas Campus began its educational program in Piran.

With the aim to finally turn his vision and dream into reality, he started his own agency in 2002 – New Moment New Ideas Company. Dragan Sakan also endeavoured to promote Serbian culture worldwide and to bring international creative minds to Belgrade.

The focus of his activities was positioning Serbia on the European and World stage, promotion of Serbian culture worldwide, introduction of local professional associations in global network and organization of festivals and events of international kind. All this led to the creation of Art Director Club Serbia (which became the member of the European network), BeogrAD Festival, Festival Piran Ideas, promotion of the National Museum of Serbia, creation of New Opinion Council, presenting of the Serbian architecture at the Venice Biennale, Marija Serifovic’s performance at Eurovision, itd. Today New Moment Gallery presents the works of Serbian artists at the European exhibitions while the New Moment Magazine hosts EPICA. Sakan brought to Belgrade such names as Edward de Bono, Jacques Seguela, Donald Gunn, Bob Garfield, Herman Vaske, Mirko Ilić while the edition of the New Moment Magazine "Balkan Baroque" was dedicated to Marina Abramović.

== Awards ==
He was pronounced Creative Person of the Year at JFTK (Yugoslav Festival of Commercial Communication) in Portorož (1985), Creative Director at the Agency Borba gaining the largest number of awards at JFTK in Portorož (1985), Propagandist of the Year at JFTK (1986). He was a creative director of the New Europe Agency of the Year in Portorož (1998). Sakan was pronounced the Ambassador of Serbian creativity in 2008. He was also granted by the Psychologists Association of Serbia getting the award "Ziza Vasic" for popularization of psychology (1986). He also received Lifetime Achievement Award by UEPS (Serbian Association of Commercial Communication) in Belgrade (2000) and Freedom Award assigned by International Peace Centre Sarajevo (2008).

Life and business philosophy of Dragan Sakan was based on the following principles: "Idea is the strongest currency", "Nothing is created unless it was dreamt first" and "One sees clearly only with the heart".

The last award won by New Moment New Ideas Company was Titanium Lion at the Cannes Lions Festival 2013.
