= Stopanska Banka =

Bank of North Macedonia

Stopanska banka
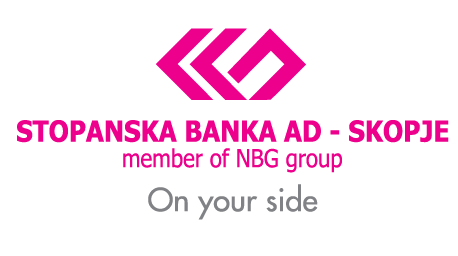
- Native name: Стопанска банка
- Type: Public limited company
- Traded as: MSE: STB
- Industry: Financial services
- Founded: 1944 in Skopje, Democratic Federal Yugoslavia
- Headquarters: Skopje, Republic of North Macedonia
- Area served: Republic of North Macedonia
- Key people: Diomidis Nikoletopoulos (CEO)
- Products: Commercial banking, Investment banking
- Net income: ▲MKD 2.24 billion (+16.8%) (2016)
- Owner: National Bank of Greece (94.60%); Other shareholders (5.40%)
- Website: www.stb.com.mk

Stopanska banka (Macedonian: Стопанска банка АД Скопје, lit. 'Economic Bank') is a bank founded in 1962 with headquarters in Skopje, Republic of North Macedonia, and claiming the legacy of an earlier institution that operated in 1944-1946. It is currently the largest bank in the Republic of North Macedonia by equity and branch network.

As of December 31, 2015, it operated a network of 64 branches.

== History ==
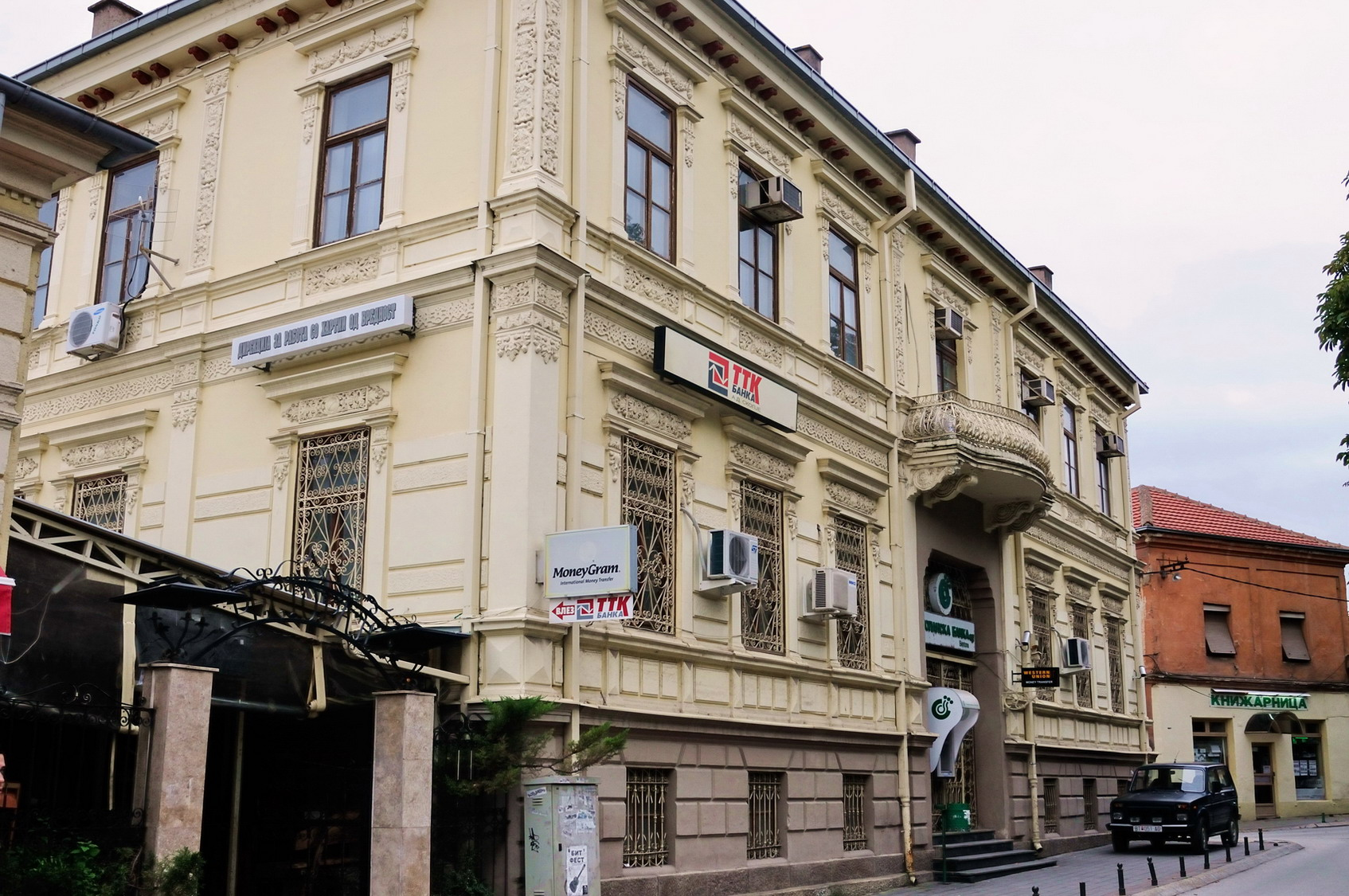
Stopanska Banka branch in Bitola, originally built for the Imperial Ottoman Bank

Stopanska Banka traces its origins to the establishment on 29 December 1944 of the Macedonian Economic Bank (Macedonian: Македонската стопанска банка) by decision of the Second Special Meeting of the Anti-fascist Assembly for the National Liberation of Macedonia. In 1946, however, that institution was merged into the National Bank of Yugoslavia, as were most Yugoslavian banks under the country's monobank system.

On 7 February 1962, the National Assembly of the People's Republic of Macedonia passed the Law on the Establishment of the Stopanska Banka in the People's Republic of Macedonia (Стопанска банка на НР Македонија), which in 1965 changed its name to Stopanska Banka Skopje. In 1971, Stopanska Banka absorbed two other banks, namely KIB Skopje and KIB Bitola. In 1977, 25 banks joined the network centered on Stopanska Banka as a so-called associated bank. Stopanska Banka subsequently was one of nine such associated banks which formed the backbone of the commercial banking sector in Yugoslavia, together with Beogradska Banka and Jugobanka in Belgrade, Vojvođanska Banka in Novi Sad, Kosovska Banka in Pristina, Ljubljanska Banka, United Bank of Croatia in Zagreb, Privredna Banka Sarajevo, and Investment Bank Titograd.

On 31 January 1990, the bank was transformed into a joint-stock company, under the name Stopanska Banka a.d. - Skopje. By then, it had 8 branches and 19 sub-branches. After the Republic of Macedonia gained its monetary independence, Stopanska Banka held a dominant position in the new country's banking system, with a share as much as 65 percent in the banking system's total assets. In 1994, the bank issued the first payment card in Macedonia.

Starting in 1995, Stopanska Banka underwent restructuring, including relief of some of its assets and liabilities, separation of five branches, and recapitalization by the Macedonian state. By 1999, the overall cost of banking sector restructuring, a large share of which directly related to Stopanska Banka, reached 45.8 percent of the country's GDP. That year, the Macedonian authorities initiated a process of privatization that resulted on 4 April 2000 in a block transaction on the Macedonian Stock Exchange, by which the National Bank of Greece (NBG), the International Finance Corporation (IFC) and the European Bank for Reconstruction and Development (EBRD) purchased 85% of the bank's equity. Later, these strategic investors further recapitalized Stopanska Banka and their combined stake grew to 91.8 percent. By end-2009, Stopanska Banka was among the three leading banks in the country, with the largest branch network (68 branches), total assets at 65.6 billion denars, and 1,106 employees.

In August 2010, NBG purchased the respective stakes of the IFC and EBRD and raised its ownership stake above 94 percent.

== See also ==
- Greek investments in North Macedonia
- List of banks in North Macedonia
- List of banks in Yugoslavia
