= Jugobanka =

Former bank in Belgrade

- Type: State-owned enterprise
- Industry: Financial services
- Founded: 1955
- Defunct: 2002
- Fate: Liquidated after the breakup of Yugoslavia
- Headquarters: Belgrade, Yugoslavia
- Area served: Yugoslavia
- Products: Banking services, loans

Jugobanka was a bank in Yugoslavia, based in Belgrade. Originally established in 1955 as the Yugoslav Bank for Foreign Trade (Serbo-Croatian: Jugoslovenska banka za spoljnu trgovinu), it adopted the name Jugobanka as part of comprehensive banking reform in 1970.

It became unviable following the breakup of Yugoslavia and was placed into liquidation in 2002, together with three other major Belgrade-based commercial banks.

== History ==
The Yugoslav Bank for Foreign Trade was established in 1955, originally funded from federal grants and credits and later from deposits and foreign borrowing.

By the 1980s, Jugobanka was one of nine so-called associated banks that formed the backbone of the commercial banking sector in Yugoslavia, together with Beogradska Banka in Belgrade, Vojvođanska Banka in Novi Sad, Kosovska Banka in Pristina, United Bank of Croatia in Zagreb, Ljubljanska Banka, Privredna Banka Sarajevo, Stopanska Banka in Skopje, and Investment Bank Titograd.

Jugobanka was placed into liquidation in 2002 together with its peers Beobanka, Beogradska Banka, and Investbanka, as public confidence in those banks had effectively evaporated. The liquidation proceedings were still ongoing by 2015.

== Head office ==
Jugobanka's head office, at Kralja Petra Street 19 in Belgrade, faced the National Bank Building across a prominent intersection. It was completed in 1960 on a design by architect Grigorije Samojlov. It later became a branch of NLB Komercijalna Banka.

In 2026, it was announced that it would be redeveloped as a hotel.

== See also ==
- Direktna Banka
- List of banks in Yugoslavia
