= Kosovska Banka =

Former bank in Pristina

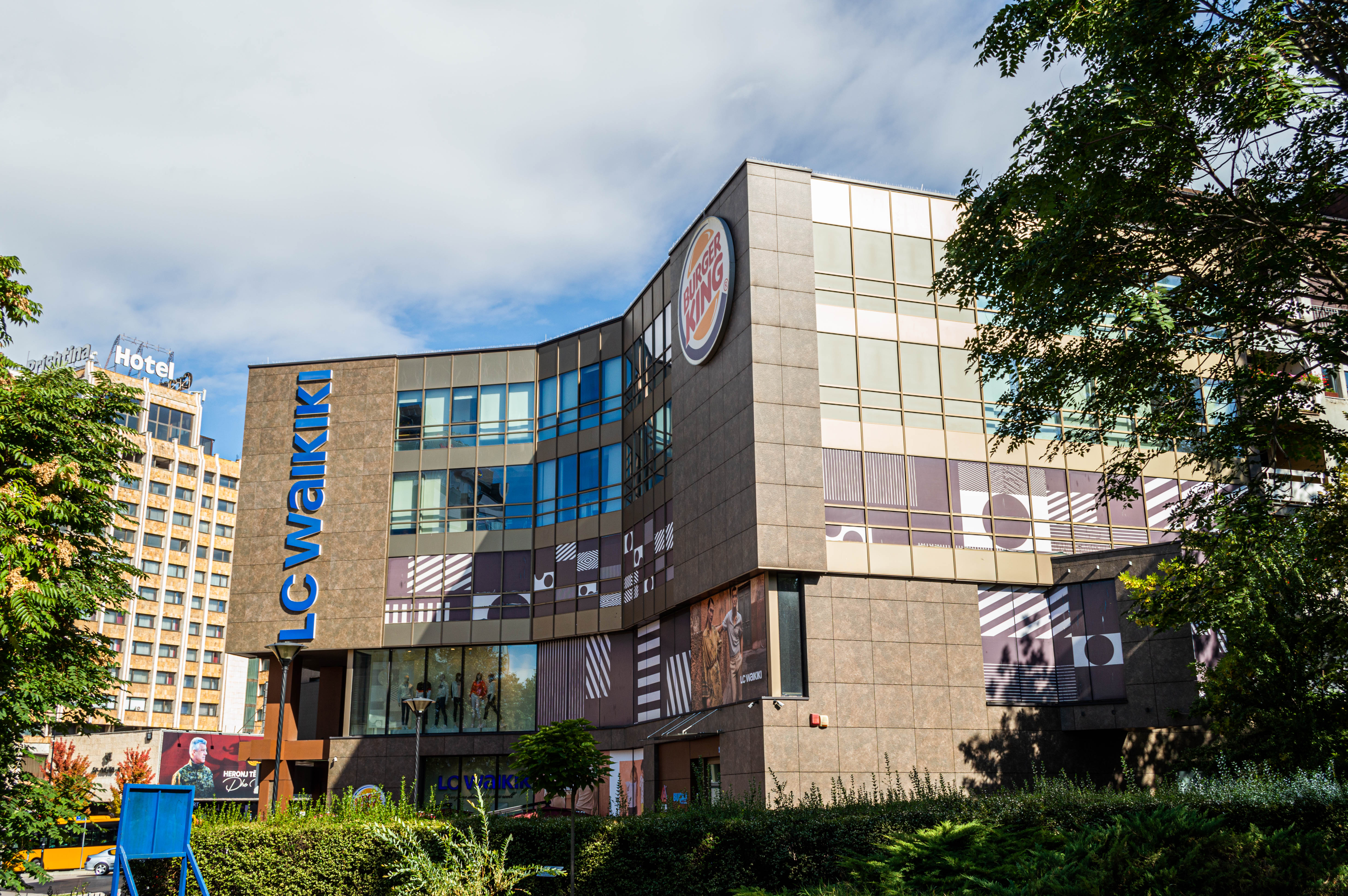
- Former Kosovska Banka building in Pristina, later redeveloped as a commercial center
- Trade name: BANKKOS
- Native name: Banka e Kosovës
- Type: Joint-stock company
- Industry: Financial services
- Founded: Late 1960s
- Defunct: 1999
- Fate: Bankrupt
- Headquarters: Pristina, Yugoslavia
- Area served: Yugoslavia
- Products: Banking services

Kosovska Banka (Albanian: Banka e Kosovës), branded as BANKKOS, was a bank established in Pristina, Yugoslavia, operating from the late 1960s to June 1999.

== History ==
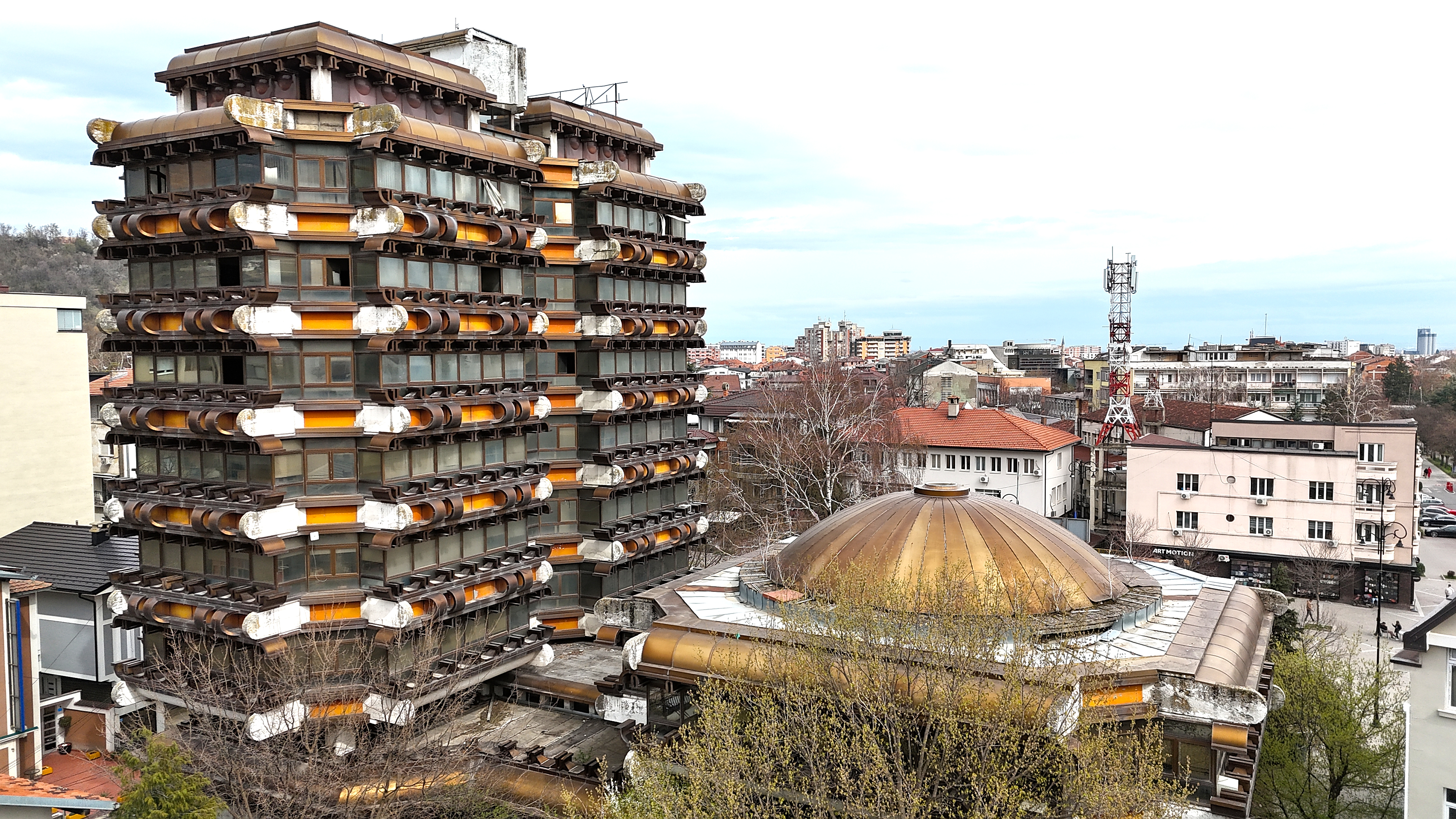
Former Kosovska Banka building in Peja, photographed in 2025

Kosovska Banka operated as both a commercial and investment bank, providing financial services to individuals, enterprises, and state institutions. It had branches in Ferizaj, Gjilan, Gjakova, Peja, Mitrovica, and Prizren. In the 1980s, it was one of nine associated banks that together formed the backbone of the commercial banking sector in Yugoslavia, together with Beogradska Banka and Jugobanka in Belgrade, Vojvođanska Banka in Novi Sad, United Bank of Croatia in Zagreb, Ljubljanska Banka, Privredna Banka Sarajevo, Stopanska Banka in Skopje, and Investment Bank Titograd.

Kosovska Banka filed for bankruptcy in 1989, with 731 million US dollars of debt. In the 1990s, it was blocked from international transactions under international sanctions against Serbia and Montenegro. The situation was aggravated when the bank terminated operations as the war broke out in 1999. In 2009, the Commercial Court in Belgrade approved the temporary relocation of the headquarters of Kosovska Banka from Pristina to Belgrade. The bankruptcy proceedings were still ongoing in 2023.

The bank's head office building in Pristina was at Marshal Tito Street 4, designed by architects Svetomir Popović and Shefqet Mullafazliu and completed in 1970. After the Kosovo War, the building was seized by UNMIK and the Kosovo authorities. It was renovated in 2011, including changes in the facade design.

== See also ==
- List of banks in Yugoslavia
