= OTP Bank (Serbia) =

Serbian subsidiary of OTP Bank Group

OTP banka
- Official logo
- Native name: ОТП банка Србија а.д. Нови Сад
- Romanized name: OTP banka Srbija a.d. Novi Sad
- Formerly: Vojvođanska banka (2019–2021); OTP banka Srbija (2007–2019)
- Type: Joint-stock company
- Industry: Finance and insurance
- Predecessor: Niška Banka; Zepter banka Kulska banka (until 2017)
- Founded: 30 April 2021; 5 years ago (current form); 10 April 1995; 31 years ago (founded)
- Headquarters: Novi Sad, Serbia
- Area served: Serbia
- Key people: Predrag Mihajlović (CEO)
- Products: Commercial banking, Investment banking
- Revenue: ▼€69.65 million (2020)
- Net income: ▼ (€10.40 million) (2020)
- Total assets: ▲€2.118 billion (2020)
- Total equity: ▼€263.79 million (2020)
- Owner: OTP Bank Group (100%)
- Number of employees: 1,880 (2020)
- Website: otpbanka.rs

OTP banka Srbija a.d. Novi Sad (Serbian: ОТП банка Србија а.д. Нови Сад, romanized: OTP banka Srbija a.d. Novi Sad) is a commercial bank in Serbia, a fully-owned subsidiary of OTP Bank Group.

== History ==
The OTP Group entered the Serbian banking market under the name "OTP banka Srbija" in 2007, being formed through the merger of three Serbian banks: Niška Banka, Zepter banka and Kulska banka.

In 2017, OTP Bank bought 100% of shares of Vojvođanska Banka from the National Bank of Greece, thus becoming the sixth-largest commercial bank in Serbia with market share of 6%.

In 2019, the process of merger of OTP banka Srbija and Vojvođanska Banka was finalized, and OTP Bank as majority owner decided to operate under name "Vojvođanska banka" on Serbian market. As of 2019, Vojvođanska banka is among the top ten largest banks in Serbia by asset size. With the fourth-largest network in Serbia, four regional business centers for small and medium-sized enterprises and with over a million clients, Vojvođanska banka covers the entire territory of the country.

In that same year, OTP Bank bought Société Générale Srbija and the process of merger finalized in 2021. That same year, OTP retired the Vojvođanska Banka brand altogether.

== Gallery ==
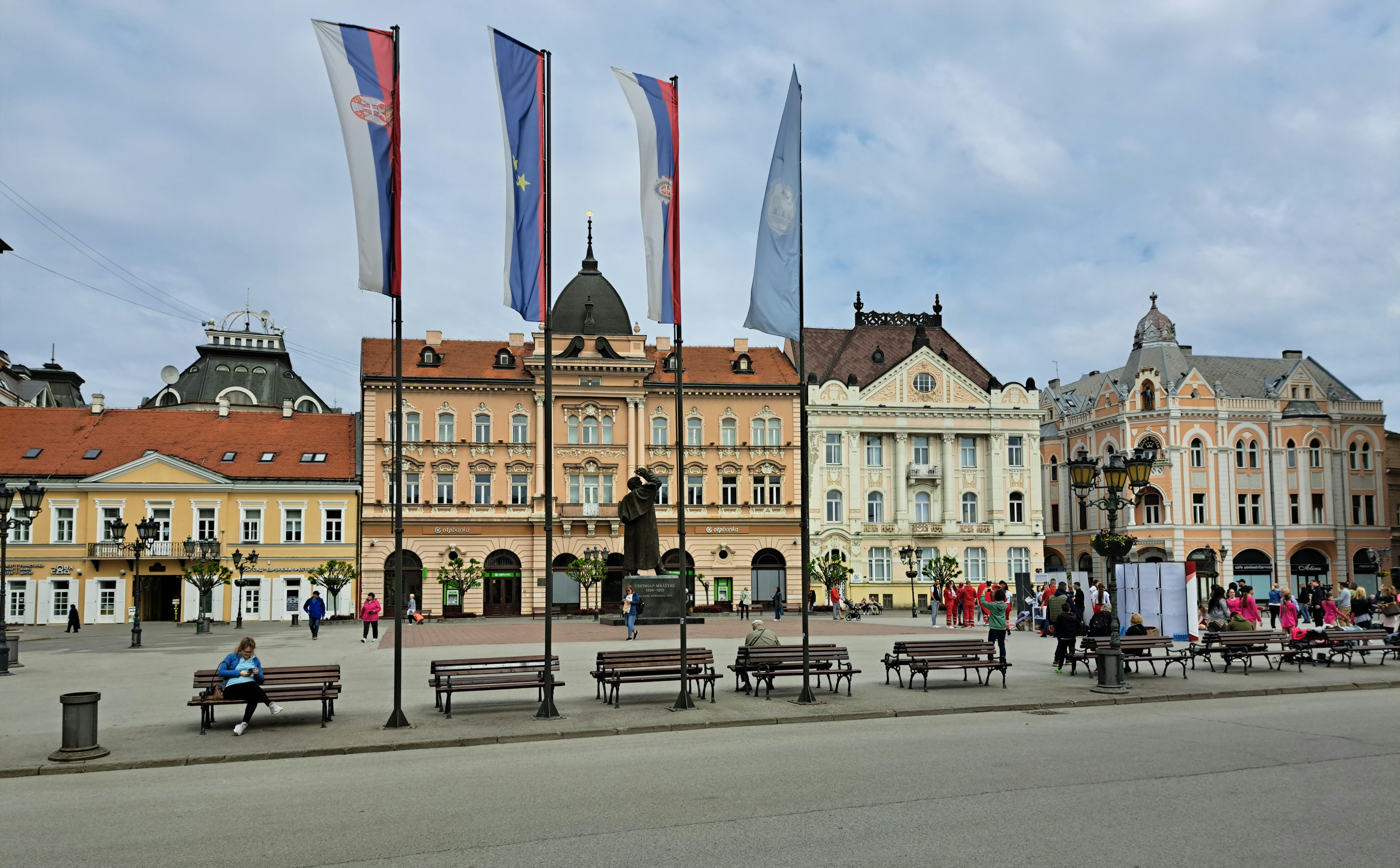
Branch in Novi Sad

Branch in Zrenjanin

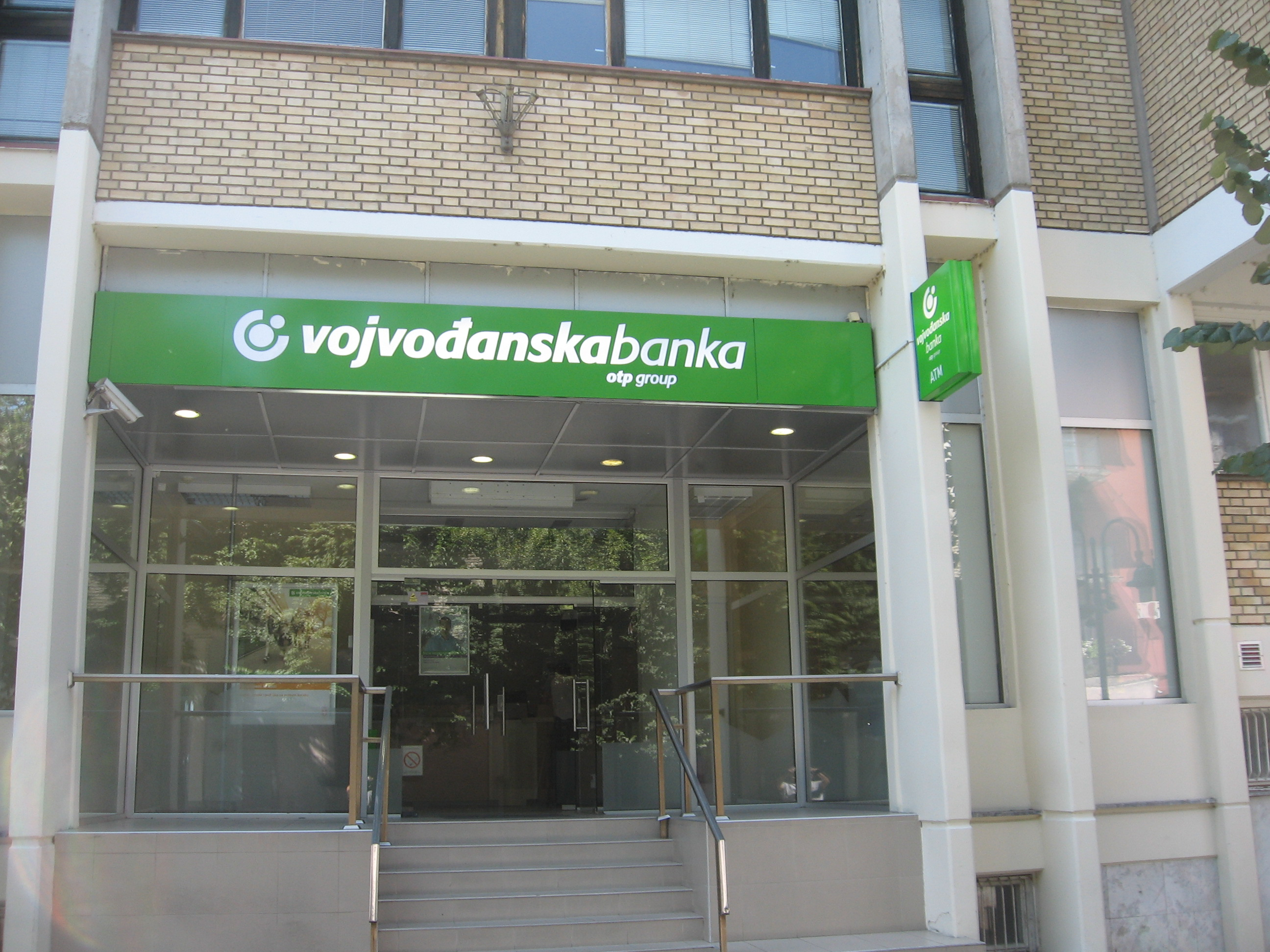
Branch in Apatin

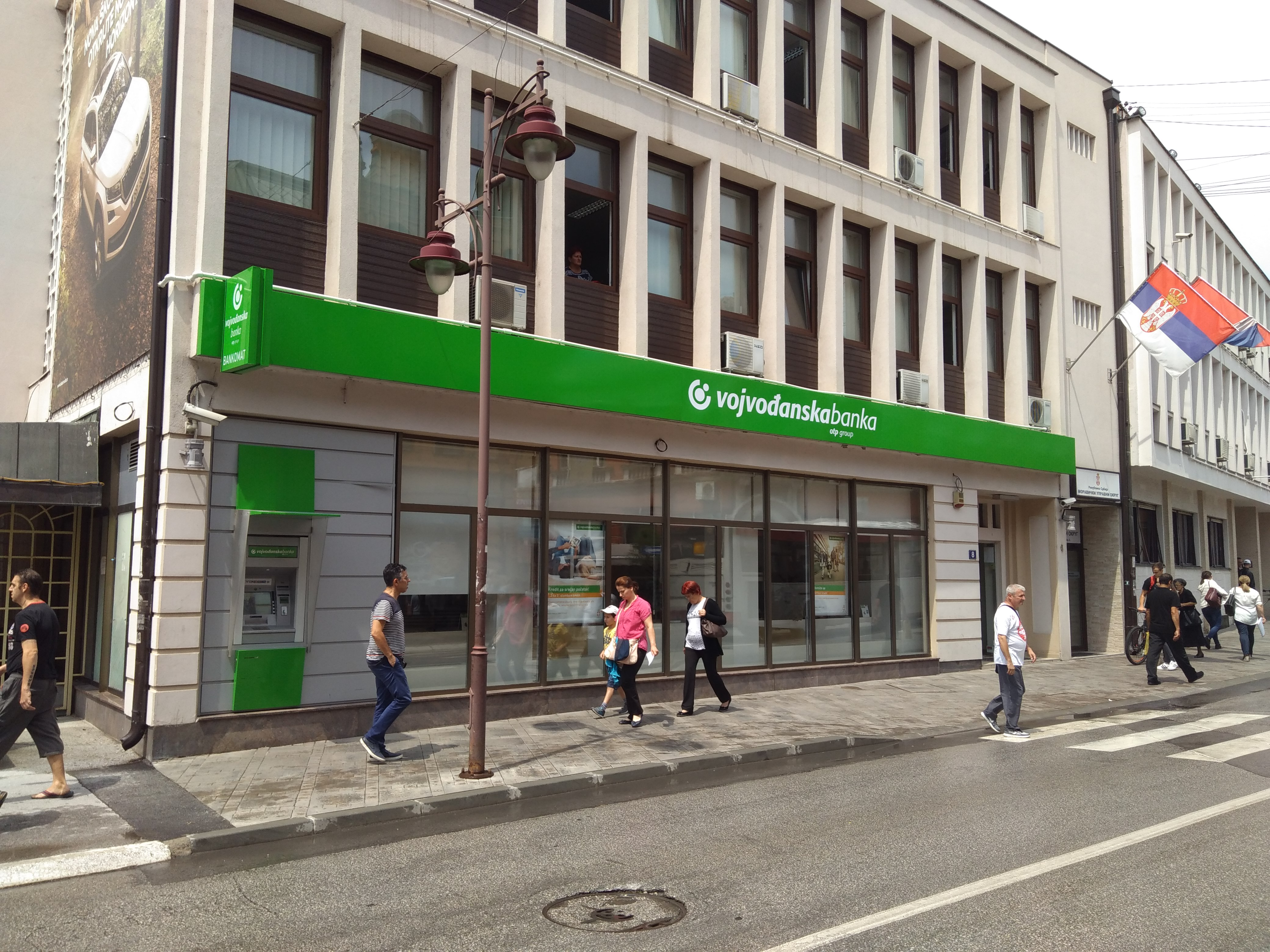
Branch in Čačak

== See also ==
- List of banks in Serbia
