= United Bank of Croatia =

Former bank in Zagreb

- Type: State-owned bank
- Industry: Financial services
- Founded: 1970s
- Defunct: 1990s
- Fate: Closed after Croatia became independent
- Headquarters: Zagreb, Yugoslavia
- Area served: Croatia
- Products: Banking services

The United Bank of Croatia (Serbo-Croatian: Udružena banka Hrvatske, UBH) was a bank in Yugoslavia, based in Zagreb. It was part of the Yugoslavia's banking sector until it closed around the 1990s when Croatia became an independent country.

== History ==
UBH was established in the early 1970s, then reorganized in mid-1983. It was one of nine associated banks that together formed the backbone of the commercial banking sector in Yugoslavia, together with Beogradska Banka and Jugobanka in Belgrade, Vojvođanska Banka in Novi Sad, Kosovska Banka in Pristina, Ljubljanska Banka, Privredna Banka Sarajevo, Stopanska Banka in Skopje, and Investment Bank Titograd.

By the mid-1980s, the UBH was a shareholder in the LHB International Handelsbank AG, in Frankfurt; the International Investment Corporation for Yugoslavia S.A., in Luxembourg; Anglo Yugoslav (LOT) Ltd, in London; Adria Bank AG, in Vienna; Banque Franco-Yougoslave, in Paris; and the Development Bank of Zambia, in Lusaka. In addition, the UBH had representative offices in London, Frankfurt and Zurich.

The UBH appears to have disappeared in the 1990s following the independence of Croatia.

== See also ==
- List of banks in Yugoslavia
