= Greek investments in North Macedonia =

North Macedonia generally has good business relations with Greece and enjoys substantial inward investment from Greece. However, the naming dispute had inhibited the establishment of full diplomatic relations so far but has not prevented both countries from engaging in military and security co-operation, cross-border investments, and cultural exchanges.

== Background ==
Since the end of the Greek embargo, which lasted between February 1994 and September 1995, Greece has become one of the most important business partners of North Macedonia. Greece is the fourth most important investor in the country (12.1% of total foreign direct investments), behind the Netherlands, Slovenia and Hungary.

The acquisitions of Stopanska Bank by the National Bank of Greece, the OKTA refinery by Hellenic Petroleum, and the mobile operator Cosmofon by the Greek Cosmote Group are some of the largest Greek business undertakings in North Macedonia so far.

According to an interview by then Finance Minister and later prime minister Nikola Gruevski, Greek investment took off after other Western investors were scared off by the 1999 Kosovo crisis:

In the 1999 Kosovo crisis, Western investors and trading partners escaped. Greek investors, who know this region better, came in and picked up enterprises at bargain basement prices. I hope investors from other countries learned the lesson. Since the current crisis started, we have sold our biggest bakery – Zhito Lux – and our biggest fairgrounds – Skopski Saem – to Greek and Slovenian investors. The new owners of North Macedonia's largest bank, Stopanska Banka, (National Bank of Greece) are planning to increase the capital.

By 1999 Greek exports to North Macedonia had reached an annual US$1.32 billion.

== 2006 Developments ==
The November 2006 European Commission report states that, "In December 2005 the two countries opened an Office for Consular, Economic and Trade Relations in Bitola and a Consulate in Thessaloniki respectively. Co-operation has developed in many areas, including transport, health, security, culture and customs. However, there has been no progress on the name issue which remains an open problem. Renewed efforts are needed, with a constructive approach, to find a negotiated and mutually acceptable solution on the name issue with Greece, under the auspices of the UN, within the framework of UN Security Council Resolutions (EEC) No 817/93 and (EEC) No 845/93, thereby contributing to regional co-operation and good neighbourly relations."

== 2007 developments ==
The total value of Greek investment in North Macedonia in the three years to 2007 declined. In the first half of 2007 it reached $6 million, less than the corresponding amounts in previous years. Greek investment had peaked in 2004 at over $30 million a year. . Nonetheless, according to newspaper Eleutheros Typos by the start of 2007 about US$263 million had been invested by Greeks. Of the 20 most sizeable investments in the country 17 are financed with Greek capital and over 20,000 (about 6% of the workforce) are employed in Greek-owned enterprises . At the time 28% of Greek investments were in banking, 25% in the energy sector, 17% in telecommunications, 15% in industry and 10% in food.

== 2025 developments ==
In November 2025, the first major Greek business mission to North Macedonia in six years was held in Skopje, signaling a renewed effort to deepen bilateral economic cooperation and expand Greek exports. The three‑day visit, from 5 to 7 November, was organized by Enterprise Greece together with the Hellenic Federation of Enterprises (SEV), the Athens Chamber of Commerce and Industry (ACCI) and the Greek Exporters Association (SEVE), in cooperation with the Greek Embassy in Skopje and the Economic Chamber of North Macedonia, with support from the Enterprise Europe Network.

The delegation comprised 22 Greek companies active in sectors including construction and building materials, food and beverages, agrotechnical and medical equipment, pharmaceuticals, logistics and services. During the mission, more than 150 targeted business‑to‑business meetings and networking sessions were held with local firms, aimed at identifying new partnerships and investment opportunities in the North Macedonian market.

As part of the visit, a Greece–North Macedonia Business Forum took place at the Economic Chamber of North Macedonia, with participation by senior representatives of the chamber, the Greek Embassy and Greek business associations. Greek and North Macedonian officials underlined that Greek products already have a strong presence in North Macedonia and highlighted the potential for further growth in trade and investment, especially given the geographical proximity and the complementarity of the two economies.

== Active Greek companies ==
- Alpha Bank Skopje - subsidiary of the Greek bank Alpha Bank
- OKTA oil refinery - part of Hellenic Petroleum
- Stopanska Banka - National Bank of Greece holds a majority stake of the company
- Delta S.A. Dairy company
- Titan Cement - Cement producing company from Athens
- KAPNIKI MICHAILIDIS S.A - Tobacco industry
- Veropoulos
