= Investment Bank Titograd =

Former bank in Montenegro

- Native name: Investiciona banka Titograd
- Type: State-owned bank
- Industry: Financial services
- Predecessor: National Bank of Yugoslavia
- Founded: 1962
- Defunct: 2003
- Fate: Acquired
- Successor: NLB Banka Podgorica
- Headquarters: Podgorica (Originally Titograd), Montenegro
- Area served: Montenegro
- Products: Banking services, loans

Investment Bank Titograd (Serbo-Croatian: Investiciona banka Titograd, IBT) was a bank in Titograd, now Podgorica, Montenegro.

Originally established in 1962 as Commercial Bank of Montenegro (Privredna banka Crne Gore) and renamed as IBT in 1966, it was the most significant bank in the Socialist Republic of Montenegro in later-era Yugoslavia. It was rebranded in 1990 as Montenegrobanka Titograd, then in 1992 as Montenegrobanka Podgorica following the capital city's renaming.

NLB Group eventually purchased Montenegrobanka in 2003.

== History ==
The Commercial Bank of Montenegro was established in 1962 by spinoff from the National Bank of Yugoslavia, then renamed as IBT in 1966. It was reorganized in 1970, and again on 16 January 1978 as a so-called associated bank. As such, it became one of nine associated banks that henceforth formed the backbone of Yugoslavia's banking sector, together with Beogradska Banka and Jugobanka in Belgrade, Vojvođanska Banka in Novi Sad, Kosovska Banka in Pristina, United Bank of Croatia in Zagreb, Ljubljanska Banka, Privredna Banka Sarajevo, and Stopanska Banka Skopje. It opened a branch in New York in early 1981.

IBT's successor Montenegrobanka was still the country's leading bank by the early 2000s. In 2001, the Montenegrin authorities initiated its reorganization, followed by a privatization process in 2002-2003. NLB won the privatization process in June 2003, thus becoming the largest bank in Montenegro, with an ownership stake of 91.5 percent. The bank was subsequently rebranded as MNB Crnogorska Banka, then NLB Banka Podgorica.

== See also ==
- Prva Banka Crne Gore
- List of banks in Montenegro
- List of banks in Yugoslavia
