= Ljubljanska banka =

Former bank in Yugoslavia

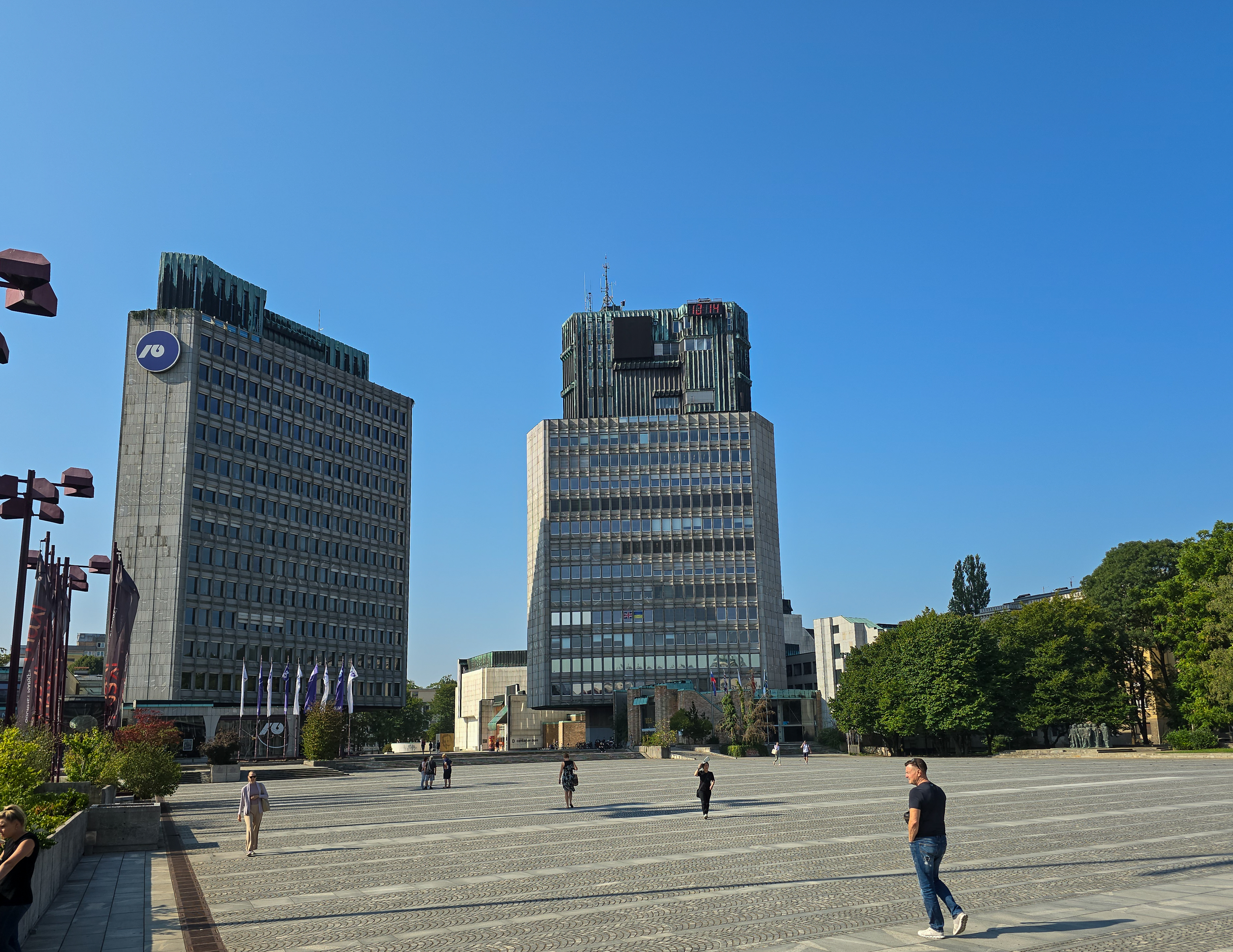
Ljubljanska Banka tower (left) on Republic Square, Ljubljana

Ljubljanska Banka (lit. 'Bank of Ljubljana') was a bank in Yugoslavia, named after and based in Ljubljana and founded in 1955. In the aftermath of the independence of Slovenia in 1991, it encountered financial distress. It was liquidated in 1994 and its operations were reorganized within a new entity, Nova Ljubljanska banka.

== Overview ==
Ljubljanska Banka was founded in 1955, as Yugoslavia evolved from its strict monobank system of the early 1950s. It opened an office in Zagreb in 1969, and also established affiliates in Sarajevo and Skopje. In the 1980s, it was one of nine so-called associated banks that formed the backbone of the commercial banking sector in Yugoslavia, together with Beogradska Banka and Jugobanka in Belgrade, Vojvođanska Banka in Novi Sad, Kosovska Banka in Pristina, United Bank of Croatia in Zagreb, Privredna Banka Sarajevo, Stopanska Banka in Skopje, and Investment Bank Titograd.

In late 1989, the Ljubljanska Banka group underwent legal restructuring. On 19 December 1989, the group's parent entity was re-registered as a joint stock company, with effect on 1 January 1990. On 29 December 1989, the Zagreb affiliate was re-registered as a branch of the Ljubljana-based group, with effect on 1 January 1990.

The group's situation evolved with the breakup of Yugoslavia in 1991. Shortly after its declaration of independence on 25 June 1991, the government of Slovenia nationalised Ljubljanska Banka and subsequently restructured it. In 1994, most of the bank’s assets and a part of its liabilities were transferred to Nova Ljubljanska Banka (NLB), a new legal entity. The old Ljubljanska Banka remained as a bad bank, initially administered by the Bank Rehabilitation Agency of Slovenia (Slovene: Agencija za sanacijo bank) and later by the Succession Fund (Sklad za nasledstvo), another Slovenian Government agency.

As part of the restructuring, some regional operations within Slovenia were also separated from NLB. This led to the establishment of Gorenjska Banka, headquartered in Kranj, as a separate financial institution in 1996.

== Croatian–Slovenian dispute ==
Ljubljana Banka's liquidation caused significant damage to Croatia–Slovenia relations. The 1994 restructuring left many of the bank's former clients without compensation; the Slovenian ones filed lawsuits that were ended by 1998, but around 130,000 savers in Croatia and 165,000 in Bosnia and Herzegovina remained.

In 2003 The Parliamentary Assembly of the Council of Europe (PACE) was asked to express an opinion on "The repayment of the deposits of foreign exchange made in the offices of the Ljubljanska Banka not on the territory of Slovenia, 1977-1991". This led to a report by the Legal Committee of the PACE (doc. PA number 10135, 14 April 2004), which was accepted by the PACE after a debate in June 2004. The rapporteur, professor E.C.M.Jurgens (Neth., Soc.)member of the Legal Committee, mentions that the non-repayment of the foreign exchange deposits has caused severe hardship to many ordinary savers. However, the complicated consequences of state succession — after the dissolution of the former Socialist Federal Republic of Yugoslavia — as to the responsibility of the successor states, together with the unclear relation of regional offices of the LB in other former republics of the federation vis a vis the head office of the LB, made it difficult for the PACE to take sides on the legal issues involved.

The European Court of Human Rights decided on individual applications in 2008 (Kovačić and others v. Slovenia) and 2014 (Ališić and others v. Bosnia and Herzegovina, Croatia, Serbia, Slovenia and the former Yugoslav Republic of Macedonia) and will have to decide an interstate case Slovenia v. Croatia

== Head office building ==
Ljubljanska Banka moved in the early 1970s into a new high-rise building (also known as TR2), originally designed in 1960 by Edvard Ravnikar as part of his master plan for Revolution Square (later Republic Square) in Ljubljana. The same building has been used as head office by NLB after the 1994 restructuring.

== See also ==
- National Bank of Yugoslavia
- List of banks in Yugoslavia
- List of banks in Slovenia
