= Vojvođanska banka =

Defunct Serbian banking and financial services company

- Native name: Војвођанска банка
- Type: Joint-stock company
- Industry: Banking
- Founded: 30 May 1995
- Defunct: 6 May 2021
- Successor: OTP Banka Srbija
- Headquarters: Novi Sad, Serbia
- Area served: Serbia
- Products: Commercial banking, Investment banking
- Owner: OTP Bank (100%)

Vojvođanska banka was a bank based in Novi Sad, Serbia, first established under that name in 1973. It was a universal bank, with functions of commercial and investment banking. It was acquired by National Bank of Greece, then by OTP Bank in 2017. In 2021 it was rebranded as OTP Banka Srbija.

== Background ==
The first predecessor entity of Vojvodjanska Banka was founded in 1868 in Sombor as a credit cooperative. In 1962, together with other operations, it was reorganized as Privredna Banka, which soon absorbed Komercijalna banka in Senta, Komercijalna banka in Bačka Topola, Sremska banka in Sremska Mitrovica, Kreditna banka in Kula, and Banatska banka in Zrenjanin.

== Yugoslav era ==
In 1973, Privredna Banka was rebranded as Vojvođanska Banka, by then the largest banking institution in the province of Vojvodina and one of the largest in the country. It had 16 branches. By the end of the 1970s, it had opened three independent representative offices in New York City, London and Frankfurt, complemented with joint representative offices in Beijing, Moscow, and Tehran. By then, it was one of nine so-called associated banks that formed the backbone of the commercial banking sector in Yugoslavia, together with Beogradska Banka and Jugobanka in Belgrade, Kosovska Banka in Pristina, United Bank of Croatia in Zagreb, Ljubljanska Banka, Privredna Banka Sarajevo, Stopanska Banka in Skopje, and Investment Bank Titograd.

In the 1980s, Vojvođanska Banka became a member of the Yugoslav Banking Consortium for the realization of the first loan granted by the International Finance Corporation for the development of small companies; it realized 70% of total foreign exchange operations of the Vojvodina economy. In 1989, Vojvođanska Banka split up into 9 equal successors, namely head office and 8 branches.

== Post-Yugoslav era ==
During the 1990s, Vojvođanska Banka started to open more branches in Central Serbia, Banja Luka (in Republika Srpska) and Podgorica (Montenegro). The branch office in Banja Luka then became a separate affiliated entity, VB Banja Luka, with the major equity share in private ownership.

On 30 May 1995, Vojvođanska Banka became a joint-stock company and correspondingly registered within the Serbian Agency for Business Registers. The government of Serbia owned a majority of shares.

In September 2006, the National Bank of Greece (NBG) bought 99.44% of Vojvođanska Banka's capital for 385 million euros. In Serbia's retail banking market, it ranked first in Serbian Dinars savings, third in foreign currency savings and first according to the number of issued VISA cards (over 430,000 cards). By then, it had a total of 104 branches in 80 cities across Serbia.

In December 2017, OTP Banka Srbija bought 100% of shares of Vojvođanska Banka from the NBG Group. In May 2019, the process of integration of OTP Banka Srbija and Vojvođanska Banka was finalized, by then operating under the single brand Vojvođanska Banka in the Serbian market. In May 2021, the Vojvođanska Banka brand was phased out and the company became OTP Banka Srbija.

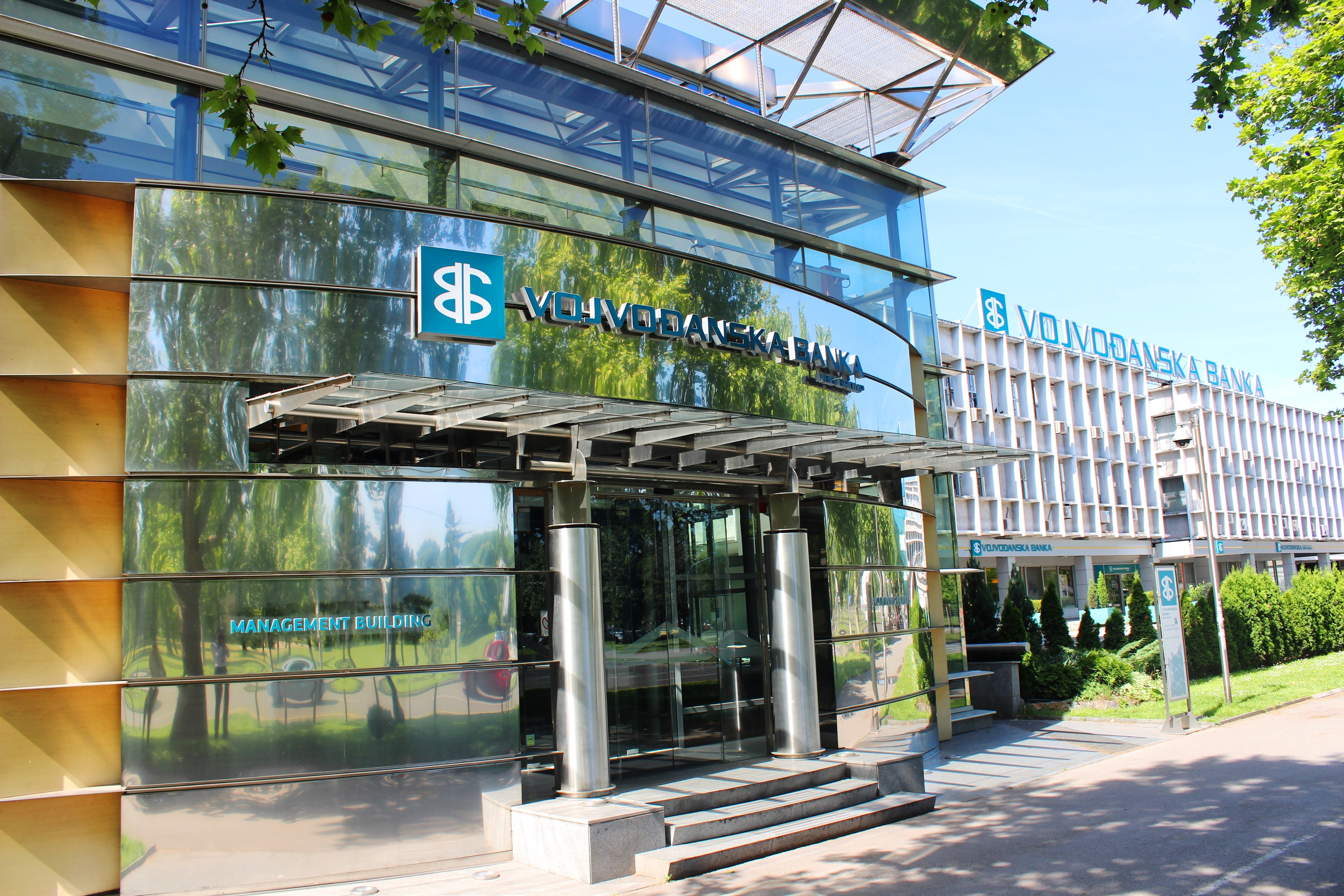
Corporate building in New Belgrade

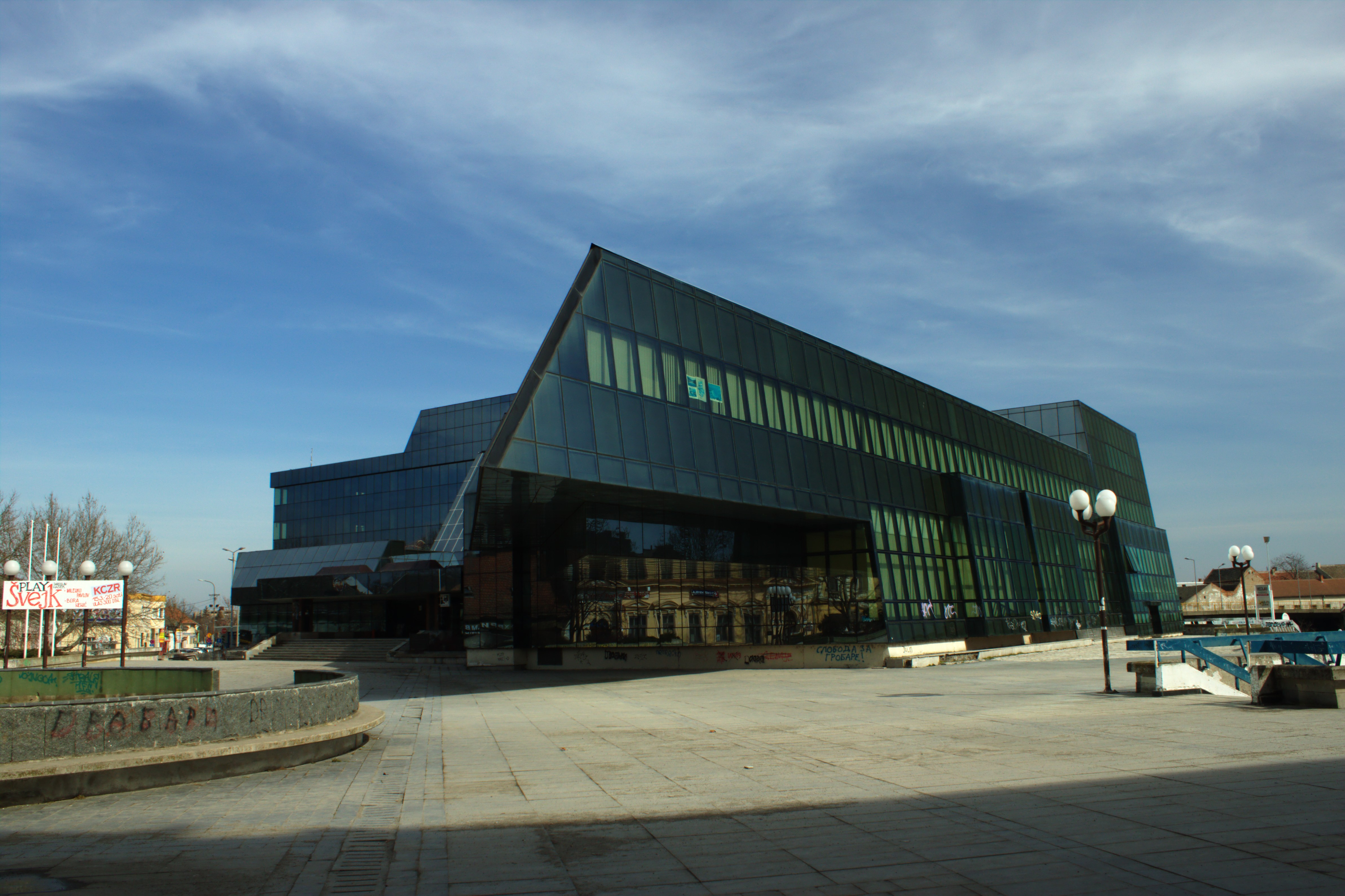
Branch in Zrenjanin

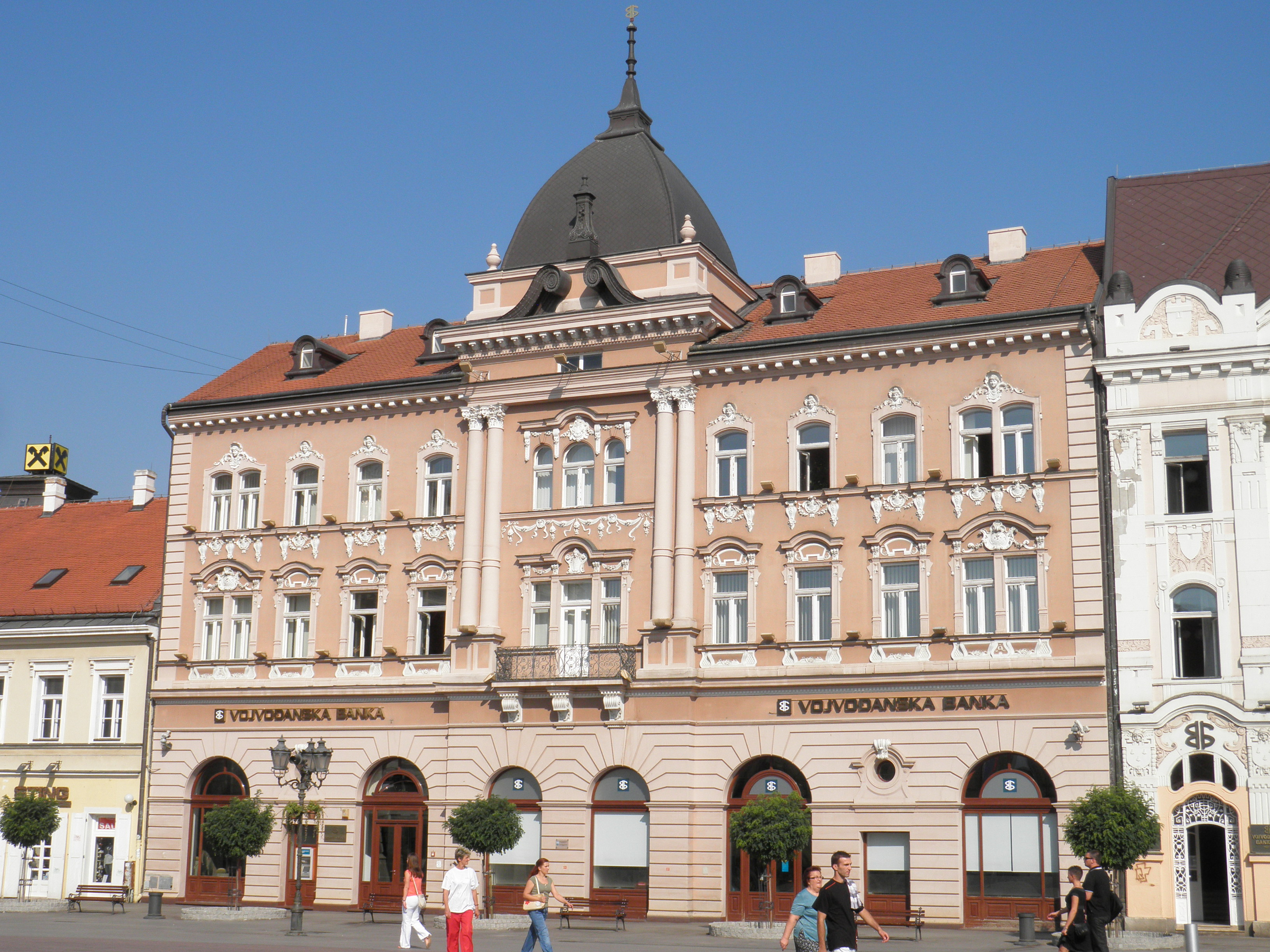
Branch in Novi Sad

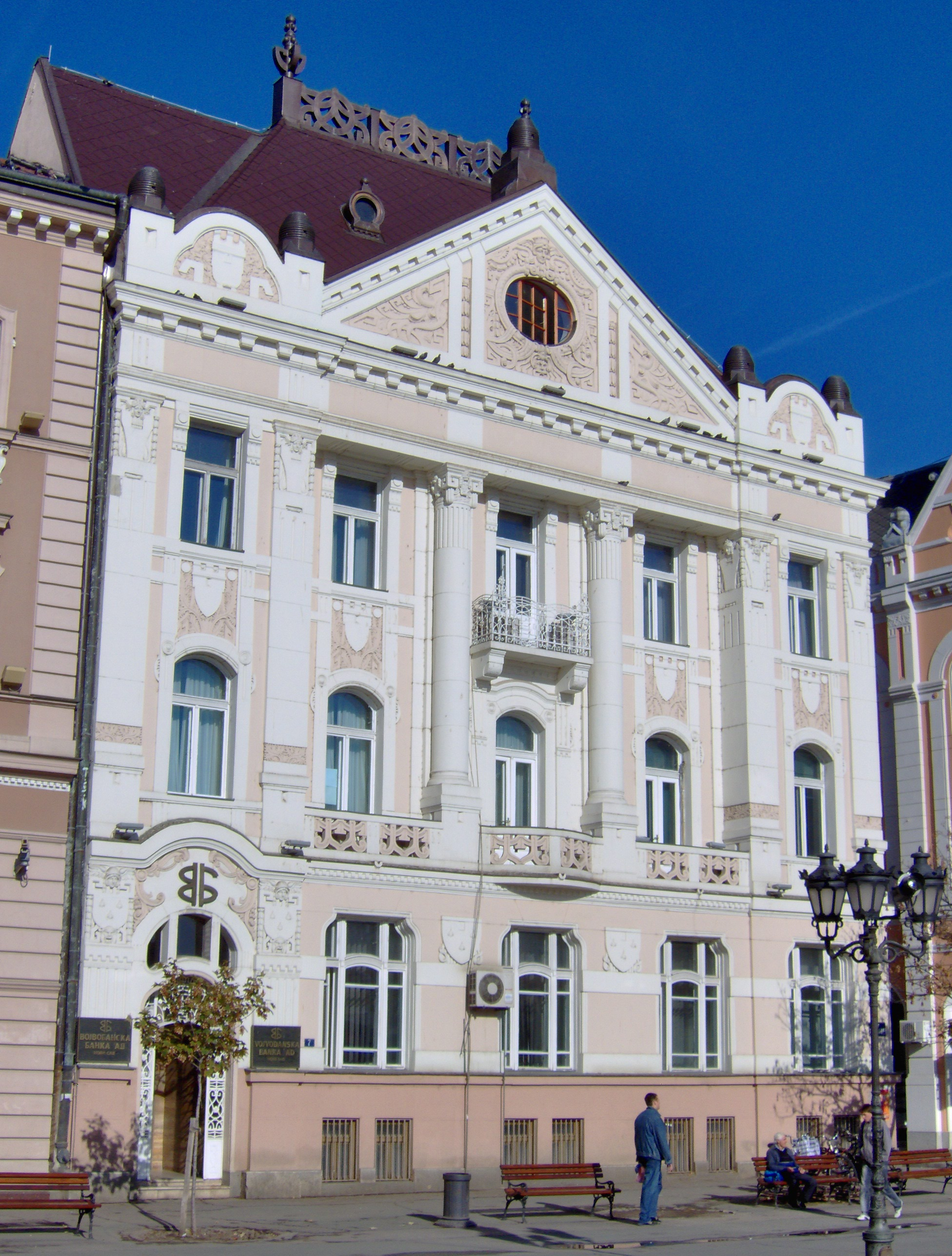
Branch in Novi Sad

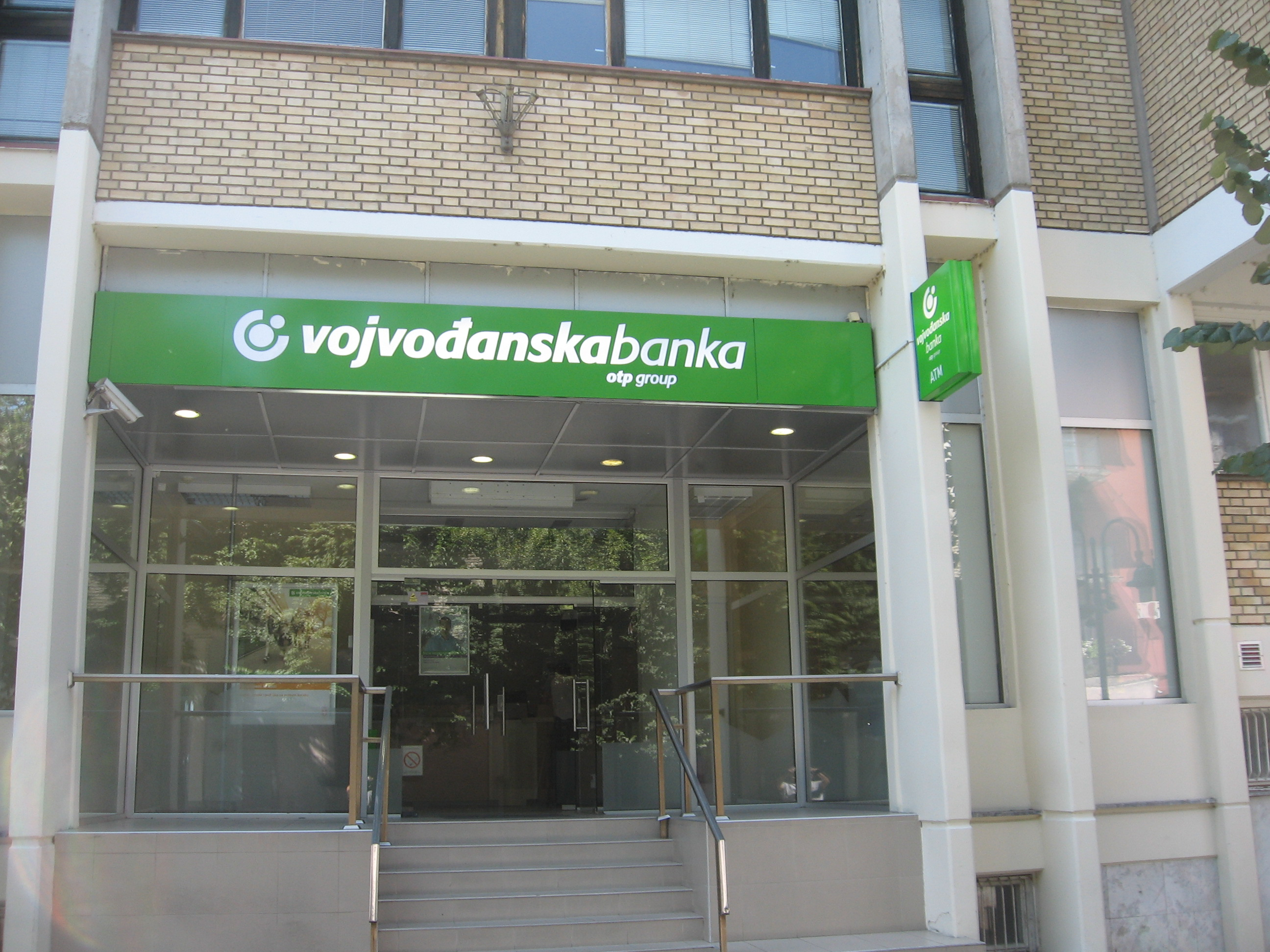
Branch in Apatin

== Branding ==
The first logo of Vojvođanska banka was designed in 1957. It contained the two upper-case Latin letters V and B like the geometric shape, where the letter V was shaped as parallelogram and the letter B was shaped as two halves of circle. This logo of the Bank was in use until 1973. From 1973, the Vojvođanska banka logo contained the two lower-case Latin letters v and b, where the letter v was smaller than the letter b and the first letter was placed above the second letter. This logo of the Bank was in use until 1992, when it was replaced logo similar to the American dollar sign which contains the two upper-case Cyrillic letters В and Б, where the letter В is reversed and touches the letter Б.

== See also ==
- List of banks in Yugoslavia
- List of banks in Serbia
