= Beogradska Banka =

Former bank in Belgrade

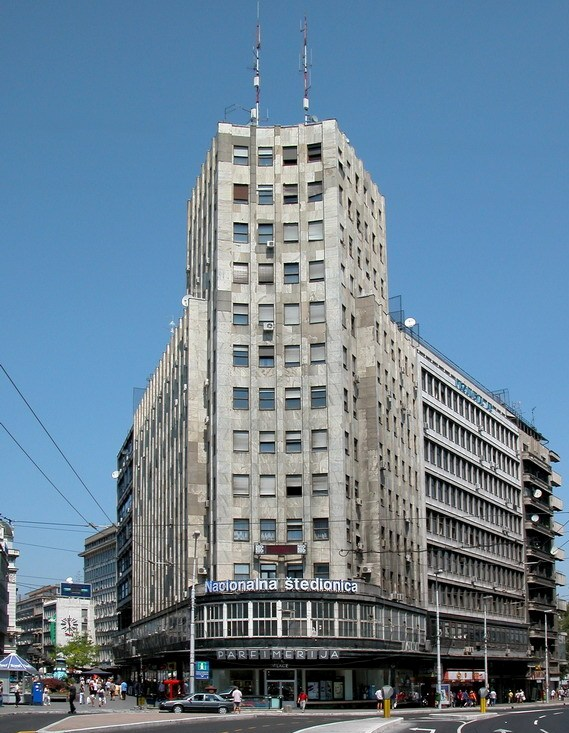
Palace Albanija on Terazije in Belgrade, former head office of Beogradska Banka

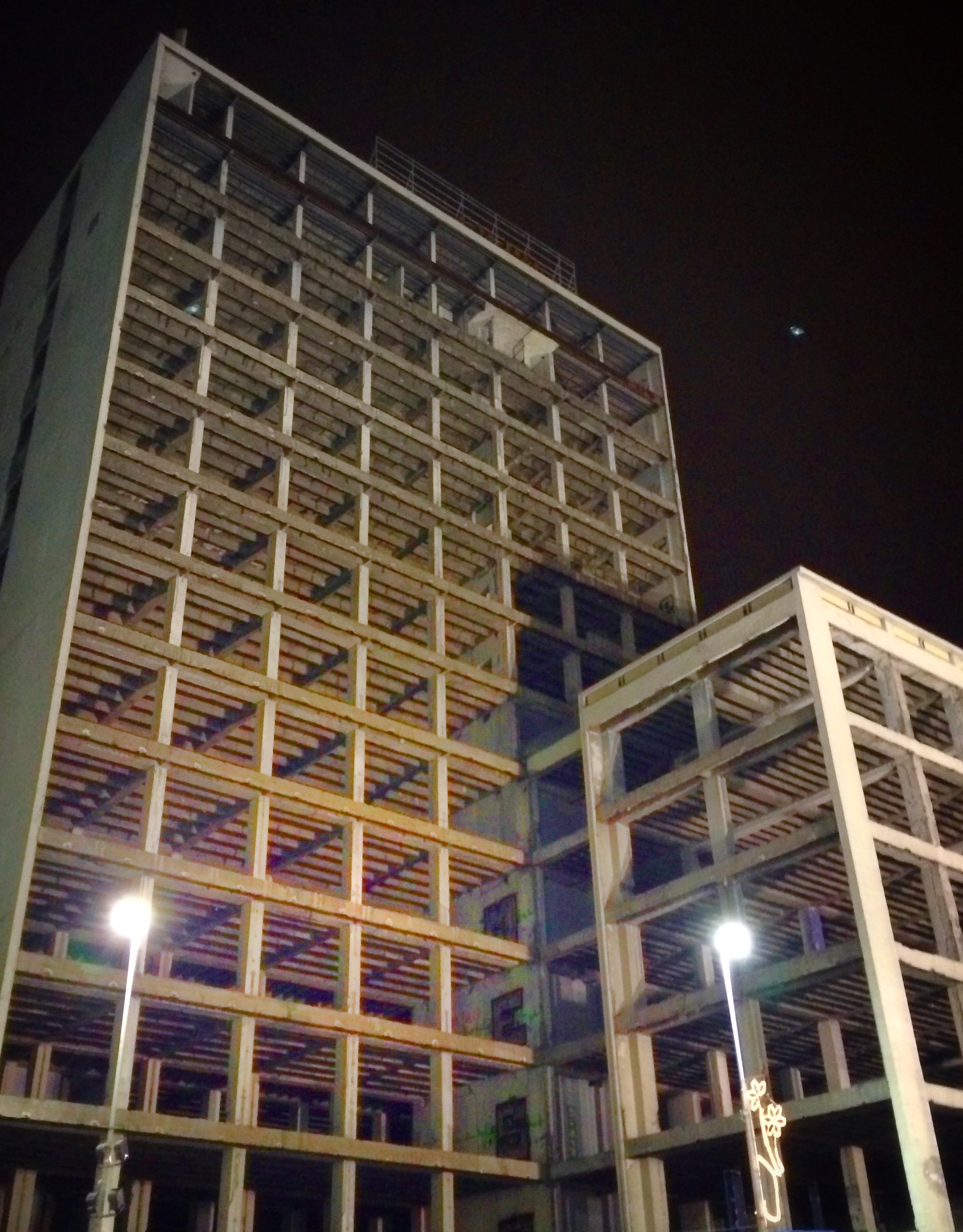
Former Beobanka building in Belgrade, abandoned after the bank's demise in 2002 and photographed in 2014

Beogradska Banka (Serbo-Croatian: Београдска Банка, lit. 'Bank of Belgrade') was a bank in Yugoslavia, based in Belgrade. It was established in 1971 by merger of two pre-existing credit institutions, the Belgrade United Bank (Serbo-Croatian: Beogradska udružena banka) and Economic Bank in Belgrade (Privredna banka u Beogradu).

A restructuring in 1978 led the bank to rename itself as United Belgrade Bank (Udružena beogradska banka, UBB), while also using the brand Beobanka. In later years, two differentially branded entities, Beobanka and Beogradska Banka, were developed in parallel and partly autonomously from each other. They both became unviable following the breakup of Yugoslavia and were placed into liquidation in 2002, together with two other major Belgrade-based commercial banks.

== History ==
The Belgrade United Bank was established in 1965. It merged with the Economic Bank in Belgrade, with effect on 1 January 1971, with the merged entity being named Beogradska banka. The bank opened branches in Vienna, Düsseldorf, Hannover, Stuttgart, Munich, Frankfurt, and East Berlin.

In 1978, Beogradska Banka was restructured together with Yugoslav Investment Bank (YIB). A successor entity for both, branded Investbanka, was established on 1 January 1978, affiliated with a new so-called associated bank branded UBB. UBB was one of nine associated banks that together formed the backbone of the commercial banking sector in Yugoslavia, together with Jugobanka in Belgrade, Vojvođanska Banka in Novi Sad, Kosovska Banka in Pristina, United Bank of Croatia in Zagreb, Ljubljanska Banka, Privredna Banka Sarajevo, Stopanska Banka in Skopje, and Investment Bank Titograd. Slobodan Milošević was the president of UBB from 1978 to 1983, giving him the opportunity to travel internationally.

In the 1990s, Beobanka and Beogradska Banka became separate brands, while the respective entities as well as UBB remained linked together, for example for the purposes of international sanctions against Serbia and Montenegro, for the evasion of which Beogradska Banka became a vehicle as it managed Beobanka's offshore operations. Several senior executives and staff, including Beogradska Banka's managing director Zoran Marković, were designated by the EU as supporters of the Milošević regime.

By 1998, Beobanka and Beogradska Banka were operating autonomously from each other; Beobanka had around 120 retail branches in Serbia and Montenegro, whereas Beogradska Banka was focused on wholesale and international activities in Belgrade. In 2001, Beobanka was described as an offshoot of Beogradska Banka.

Both Beobanka and Beogradska Banka were placed into liquidation in 2002, together with Investbanka and Jugobanka, as public confidence in those banks had effectively evaporated. The liquidation proceedings were still ongoing by 2015.

== Branding and marketing ==
In the 1990s, Beobanka and Beogradska Banka adopted different but related logos.

From 1994 to 1998, Beobanka was the main sponsor of the Red Star Belgrade football club. It also sponsored a basketball club, KK Beobanka (later KK Vojvodina Srbijagas), between 1995 and 2000.

== Buildings ==
Beogradska Banka had its head office in the Palace Albanija, an iconic interwar building on Terazije in downtown Belgrade.

In the 1990s Beobanka located its head office into a building on the Zeleni Venac thoroughfare of Belgrade, originally erected in 1960 for Energoprojekt. In 2007 the building was stripped of its external cladding, and became an iconic ruin. Its renovation as a business center was announced in 2023.

== See also ==
- List of banks in Yugoslavia
