= List of tallest buildings in Croatia =

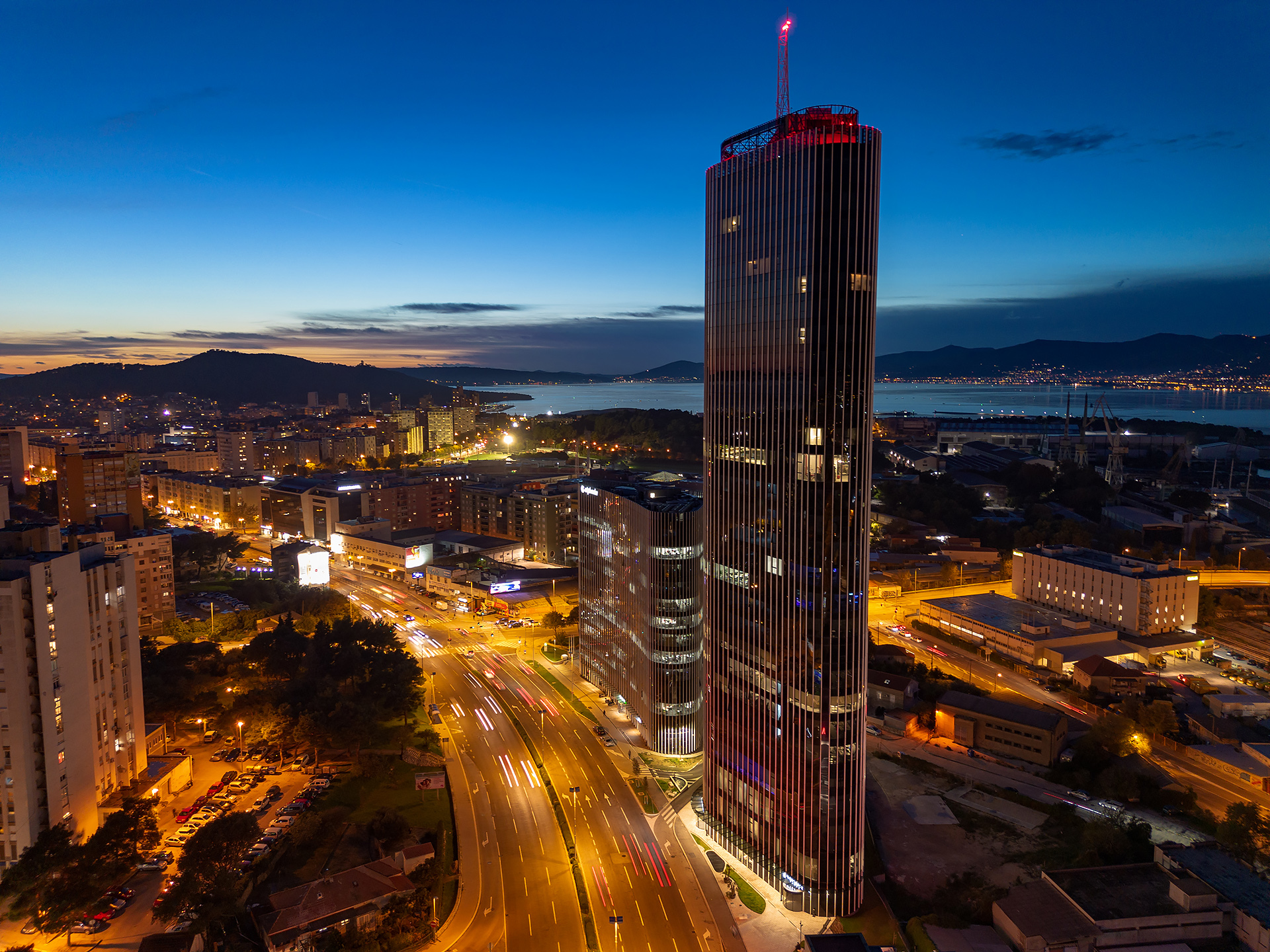
The current tallest building in Croatia is Dalmatia Tower in Split

This list of tallest buildings in Croatia ranks buildings in Croatia by official height.

The tallest structure in Croatia is the 340-metre (1,120 ft) chimney of the Plomin Power Station in Plomin, Istria. The tallest Croatian skyscraper is Dalmatia Tower in Split. It is 135-metre (443 ft) tall and it was completed in 2022. The first skyscraper was the Loewy Building built in 1933, by Croatian architect Slavko Löwy. It has 9 floors and it is 35-metre (115 ft) tall, it was built in Zagreb. One of the most popular skyscrapers in Zagreb is Neboder - Ilica 1, it was renovated in 2006 but originally was completed in 1958.

== Tallest buildings ==
The following ranks existing 50 buildings over 50 metres (160 ft) in Croatia by height.

Was the tallest skyscraper in Croatia upon completion
Religious buildings

Rank	Name	Location	Height meters / feet	Floors	Year	Notes	Image
N/A	Zagreb TV Tower	Sljeme, Medvednica	169 (554)	N/A	1973	TV Tower and tallest structure in Croatia. Currently works as TV Tower station and observation deck. Located on the peak of Medvednica mountain above Zagreb	
1	Dalmatia Tower	Split	135 (443)	27	2023	Tallest skyscraper in Split and Croatia with AC Hotel by Marriott on top of the building	
2	Zagreb Cathedral	Zagreb	108.5 (356)	/	1902	Roman Catholic Cathedral, once the tallest building in Croatia, held that record for 122 years. Currently the tallest religious building in Croatia.	
3	Strojarska Business Center	Zagreb	96.15 (315.5)	25	2015	Second tallest skyscraper in Croatia, and tallest skyscraper in Zagreb	
4	Eurotower	Zagreb	96 (315)	26	2006	Headquarters of the Zagreb Stock Exchange and third tallest skyscraper in Croatia.	
5	23A and 23B Franjo Čardek Street	Rijeka	96 (315)	30	1975	Pair of residential buildings, tallest in Rijeka and tallest residential buildings in Croatia.	
6	Zagrepčanka	Zagreb	95 (312)	27	1976	Office building, third tallest skyscraper in Zagreb.	
7	Osijek Co-cathedral	Osijek	94 (308)	/	1898	Roman Catholic co-cathedral	
8	Cibona Tower	Zagreb	92 (302)	22	1987	Nicknamed "Mirko's cigar", its a home of KK Cibona basketball team.	
9	Đakovo Cathedral	Đakovo	84 (276)	/	1882	Roman Catholic cathedral	
10	Sky Office Tower	Zagreb	81 (266)	22	2012	Office building	
11	Rastočine 3, 4, 5, 6 and 7	Rijeka	80 (260)	25	1973	Set of four residential buildings	
12	Zagrebtower	Zagreb	79 (259)	22	2006	Office building	
13	Karamanova 4	Split	78 (256)	21		Second tallest building in Split	
14	Zonar Hotel Zagreb	Zagreb	75 (246)	20	1968	Former Four Points by Sheraton hotel which later turned into Panorama Hotel and then Zonar Hotel Zagreb	
15	Prisavlje 6-12	Zagreb	73.1 (240)	25	1974	Residential building	
16	Trešnjevačka ljepotica	Zagreb	73 (240)	24	1969	Residential building	
17	Braće Domany 2-8	Zagreb	73 (240)	23	1975	Residential building	
18	Richter's Skyscrapers	Zagreb	70 (230)	22	1968	Colloquially called Rakete ("The Rockets") due to their shape.	
19	HOTO Tower	Zagreb	67.5 (221)	16	2004	Also known as T-Com Tower.	
20	The Westin Zagreb	Zagreb	65 (213)	17	1970	Former Intercontinental Hotel which later turned into The Westin Zagreb	
21	Eurodom Osijek	Osijek	65 (213)	14	2015	Office and shopping building	
22	Neboder - Ilica 1	Zagreb	64 (210)	18	1958	Office building and Observation Deck	
23	Green Gold Building	Zagreb	63.5 (208)	17	2011	DoubleTree by Hilton hotel Zagreb and headquarters of Croatian Football Federation	
24	Tower Centar Rijeka	Rijeka	63 (207)	17	2007	Office building	
25	Hotel Osijek	Osijek	62.5 (205)	16	1977	High-rise building, later turned into Hotel Osijek	
26	Church of St. Euphemia	Rovinj	62 (203)	/	1677	Roman Catholic church	
27	Mamutica	Zagreb	60 (200)	19	1974	Tallest and biggest residential building in Zagreb and one of biggest in Europe. It has 19 floors, 1169 apartments and 5000 people live in it.	
28	Četverolist	Osijek	60 (200)	18	1973	Tallest residential building in Osijek	
29	HRT Building	Zagreb	60 (200)	6	1975	Croatian Radiotelevision headquarters building	
30	Chromos Tower	Zagreb	58.5 (192)	15	1989	Office building	
31	Cathedral of Saint Domnius	Split	57 (187)	/	13th century	Roman Catholic cathedral	
32	Cathedral of Saint Anastasia	Zadar	56 (184)	/	1894	Roman Catholic cathedral	
33	West Gate Tower A	Split	55 (180)	12	2016	Office building	
34	Almeria Business Centre	Zagreb	55 (180)	15	2008	Business Centre	
35	Super Andrija	Zagreb	53 (174)	14	1973	Residential building in Zagreb suburb Siget	
36	Fiumme Skyscraper	Rijeka	53 (174)	12	1942	Residential building, first skyscraper in Fiumme-then part of Kingdom of Italy	
37	Crveni neboder ("Red skyscraper")	Osijek	52.7 (173)	14	1968	Residential building	
38	Papagajke	Zagreb	51 (167)	14	1970s	Residential buildings	
39	Ibler Building	Zagreb	51 (167)	9	1958	Residential building	
40	Avenue Mall Building	Zagreb	51 (167)	9	2005	Office & Shopping Mall in Novi Zagreb	
41	Zadarska Street Building	Zagreb	51 (167)	11		Office building	
42	Zagreb Mosque	Zagreb	51 (167)	/	1987	Biggest mosque in Croatia	
43	Vukovar water tower	Vukovar	50.33 (165.1)	/		Former water tower, heavily damaged during Battle of Vukovar in 1991, and stands as a symbol of Vukovar and Croatian war of Independence	
44	Industrogradnja	Zagreb	50 (160)	15		Headquarters for Ministry of Croatian Veterans	
45	FER Building	Zagreb	50 (160)	13	1956	Faculty of Electrical engineering building	
46	Euroherc Building	Zagreb	50 (160)	12	2006	Office building	
47	Eurotower II	Zagreb	50 (160)	12	2008	Residential & Office building, smaller building opposite Eurotower	
48	Kockica	Zagreb	50 (160)	10	1968	Designed by Ivan Vitić, currently being used as headquarters for Ministry of Maritime Affairs, Transport and Infrastructure	

== Former tallest ==
This list contains tallest buildings in Croatia which were once the tallest but were demolished or destroyed.

Former rank	Name	Location	Height meters / feet	Floors	Year built	Year demolished	Notes	Image
20	Vjesnik	Trnje, Zagreb	67 (220)	16	1972	2026	Following a fire that occurred in November 2025, the building was deemed beyond repair and was demolished in June 2026.	

== Prospective ==
This list contains tallest buildings in Croatia which are under construction or approved.

=== Approved ===
Name	Location	Height meters / feet	Floors above ground	Notes
Jarun Panorama	Zagreb	150	37	Approved in 2019
Poslovni Centar Savica	Zagreb	137	37	Approved in 2014

== Timeline of tallest buildings in Zagreb ==
This lists buildings that once held the title of tallest building in Zagreb.

Name	District	Height meters / feet	Floors	Year	Notes	Image
Loewy Building	Lower Town	34.95 (114.7)	9	1934	First skyscraper built in Zagreb by Slavko Löwy	
Ibler Building	Lower Town	51 (167)	14	1958	Residential building, first building built in Zagreb over 10 floors. Built by Drago Ibler	
Neboder - Ilica 1	Ban Jelačić Square	64 (210)	18	1958	First business building/skyscraper in Zagreb and Croatia	
Richter's Skyscrapers	Vrbik, Trnje	70 (230)	22	1968	Tallest residential building at the time in Zagreb. Shape resembles "rockets", therefore the name.	
Zonar Hotel Zagreb	Ciglenica, Trešnjevka	75 (246)	20	1968	First super-tall hotel in Croatia opened as “Omladinski hotel Sport”, later becoming Four Points by Sheraton, later Panorama Hotel and now Zonar Hotel Zagreb.	
Zagrepčanka	Vrbik, Trnje	95 (312)	27	1976	Business tower, first skyscraper over 90 m in Croatia, inspired by Dreischeibenhaus building in Düsseldorf. Tallest skyscraper in Zagreb and Croatia until 2006.	
Euro Tower I	Vrbik, Trnje	96 (315)	26	2006	Headquarters of the Zagreb Stock Exchange was tallest skyscraper in Zagreb and Croatia until 2015.	
Strojarska Business Center	Kanal, Trnje	96.15 (315.5)	25	2015	Commercial and residential building, tallest skyscraper in Croatia until Dalmatia Tower surpassed it in 2023. Currently the tallest skyscraper in Zagreb.	

== See also ==
- List of tallest buildings in Europe
- List of tallest buildings in the European Union
