= Dalmatia Tower =

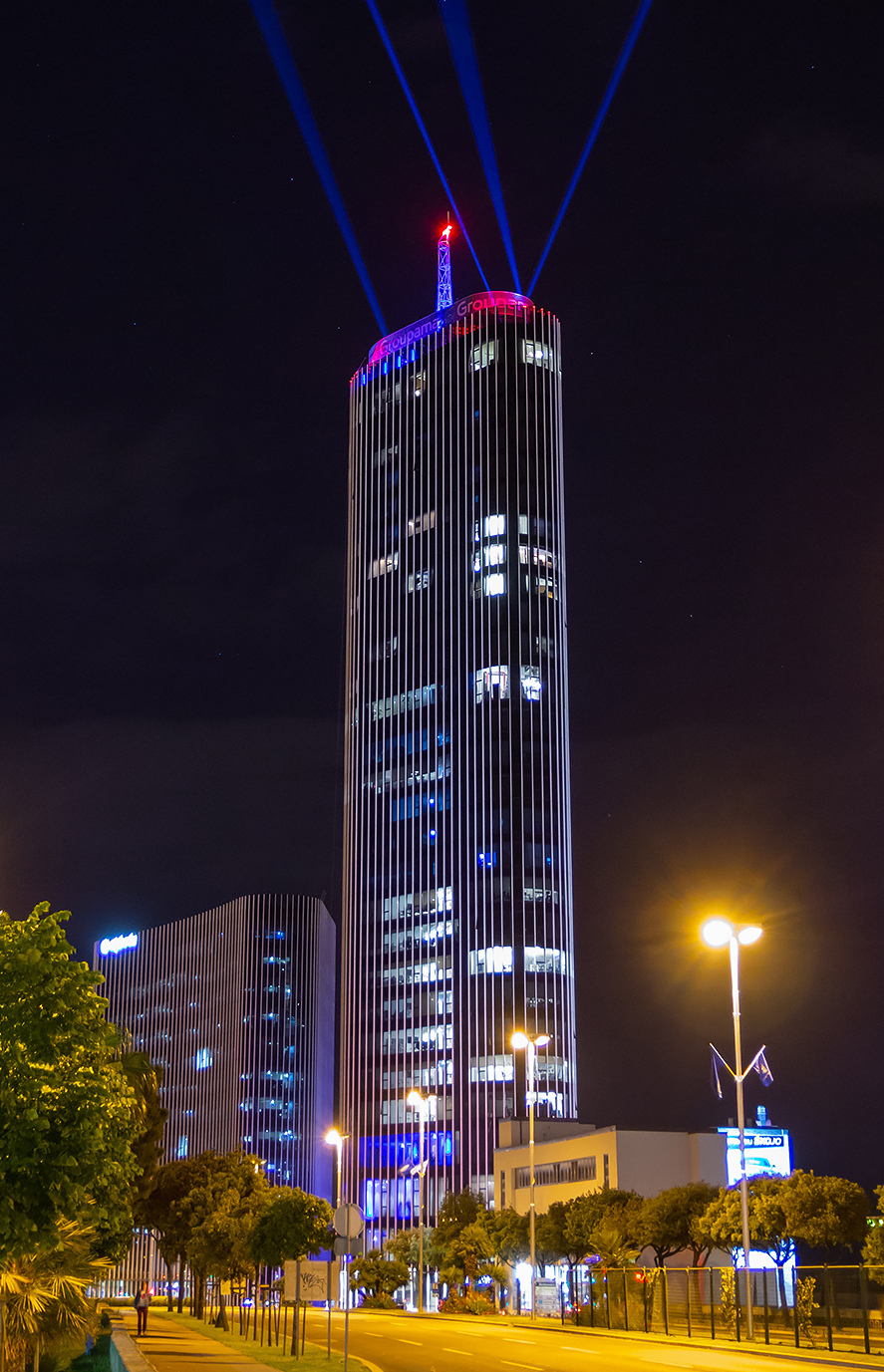
- Dalmatia Tower completed in 2023.
- Interactive map of the Dalmatia Tower area

Record height
- Tallest in Croatia since 2023^{[I]}
- Preceded by: Strojarska Business Center

General information
- Status: Completed
- Type: Mixed-use: office, hotel
- Architectural style: Neo-futurism
- Location: Split, Croatia
- Coordinates: 43°31′13″N 16°27′04″E
- Construction started: 2015
- Completed: 2023
- Cost: €80 million

Height
- Antenna spire: 135 m (443 ft)
- Roof: 112 m (367 ft)

Technical details
- Floor count: 27
- Lifts/elevators: 8

Design and construction
- Architect: Otto Barić
- Developer: Westgate Group
- Main contractor: Tehnika d.d.

Website
- slobodnadalmacija.hr/premium-2020/projekt-westgate-dalmatia-tower-za-marriott-hotel-spreman-1065197

Dalmatia Tower (Croatian: Toranj Dalmacija) is a high-rise office building and a hotel in Split, Dalmatia, Croatia. It is located on the intersection of the Domovinskog rata Street and the Dubrovačka Street and it is the tallest building in Croatia, with the height of 135 m with antenna.

Designed as a mixed-use skyscraper, Dalmatia Tower houses a AC Hotel, operating under the Marriott Hotels and managed by Westgate Hospitality Management company. The business section of the tower is home to leading international and domestic companies, such as Ericsson and OTP Bank.

== Site and develop ==
Dalmatia Tower is situated on Kopilica district of Split, on the intersection of Domovinskog rata Street and the Dubrovačka Street. The tower was developed following an architectural competition in which the winning proposal was selected by an independent jury appointed by the Split Society of Architects. The project proposed two high-rise buildings on a single development site and was planned for construction in two phases.

The site is located between Domovinskog rata Street and Komulovića put. An elevation difference of approximately five metres between the two streets influenced the building's layout, allowing one side of the structure to be accessed at ground level while the opposite side corresponds to a basement level. This arrangement enabled the construction of an additional underground storey within the planning conditions applicable to the site.

The development consists of two towers sharing a common underground structure with five basement levels. The first phase included a 13-storey office building, occupied by OTP Bank Croatia. The second phase comprises a mixed-use high-rise containing the AC Hotels by Marriott Split, office space, conference facilities, restaurants and other commercial uses.

== History ==
=== Construction ===
Construction of the complex began in 2017 and was completed in 2023, with the buildings opening the following year. The development was designed by Croatian architect Otto Barić.

The building is a part of the Westgate Towers complex, which includes two skyscrapers. First one to be built was a 12-story, 55 meters tall, Westgate Tower A, housing the headquarters of Splitska Banka, which started construction in mid 2015 and opened in late 2016.

Second tower was initially called Westgate Tower B, and its initial floor count was 17 with a height of 75 meters. Construction started in late 2016, however, upon reaching the 17th floor the work was halted for six months until the developer acquired the new building permit allowing the erection of additional 10 floors, now totaling 27. The work on the tower resumed in mid 2018. Construction was completed in 2023.

=== Planning and height ===
The original design proposed a 17-storey mixed-use tower. During the design process the project was revised to utilise the maximum development capacity permitted by the Split General Urban Plan (GUP). The revised scheme increased the highest occupied floor to 99.5 metres. Mechanical floors and lift overruns extend the architectural height to approximately 120 metres. The tower contains 27 above-ground storeys. An antenna installed above the roof raises the maximum structural height to approximately 135 metres.

The project underwent several amendments to the building permit during its development. A revised permit reflecting the increased height became legally effective in 2016. A subsequent amendment approved the enclosure surrounding the rooftop mechanical equipment. Following technical inspection and administrative review, the project received an occupancy permit. The structural system was designed by structural engineer Tomislav Vuletić. The building uses a reinforced concrete structural frame, which is the predominant structural system for high-rise construction in Croatia.

=== Façade ===
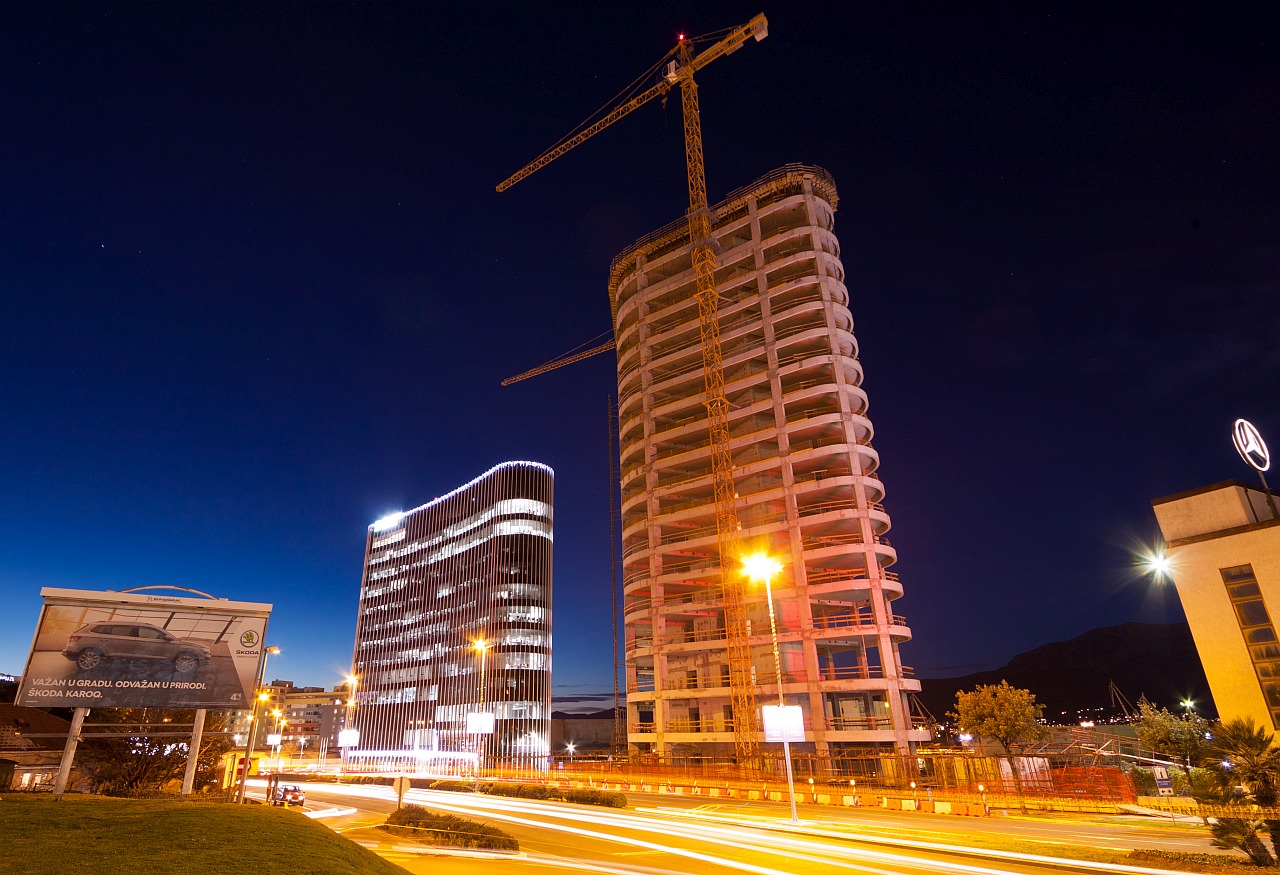
Dalmatia tower during construction, December 2017

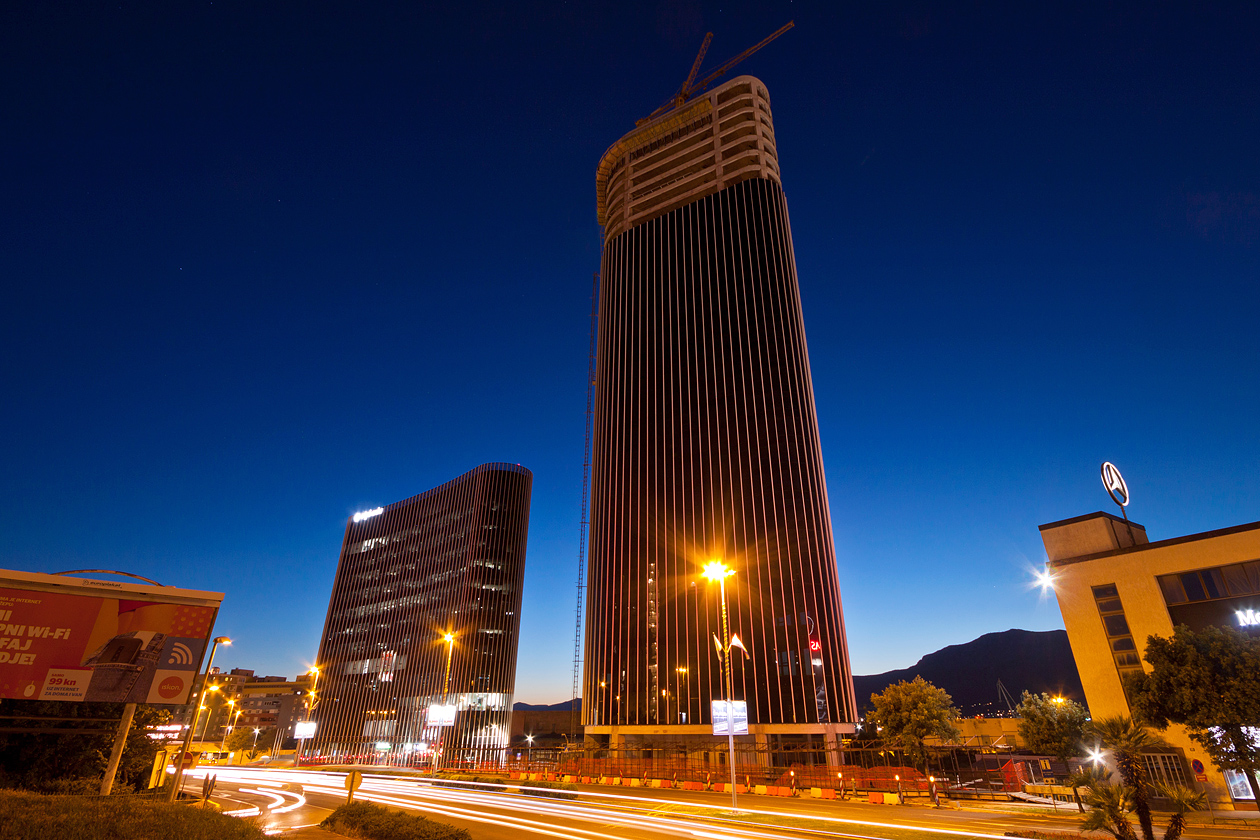
Dalmatia Tower, June 2020

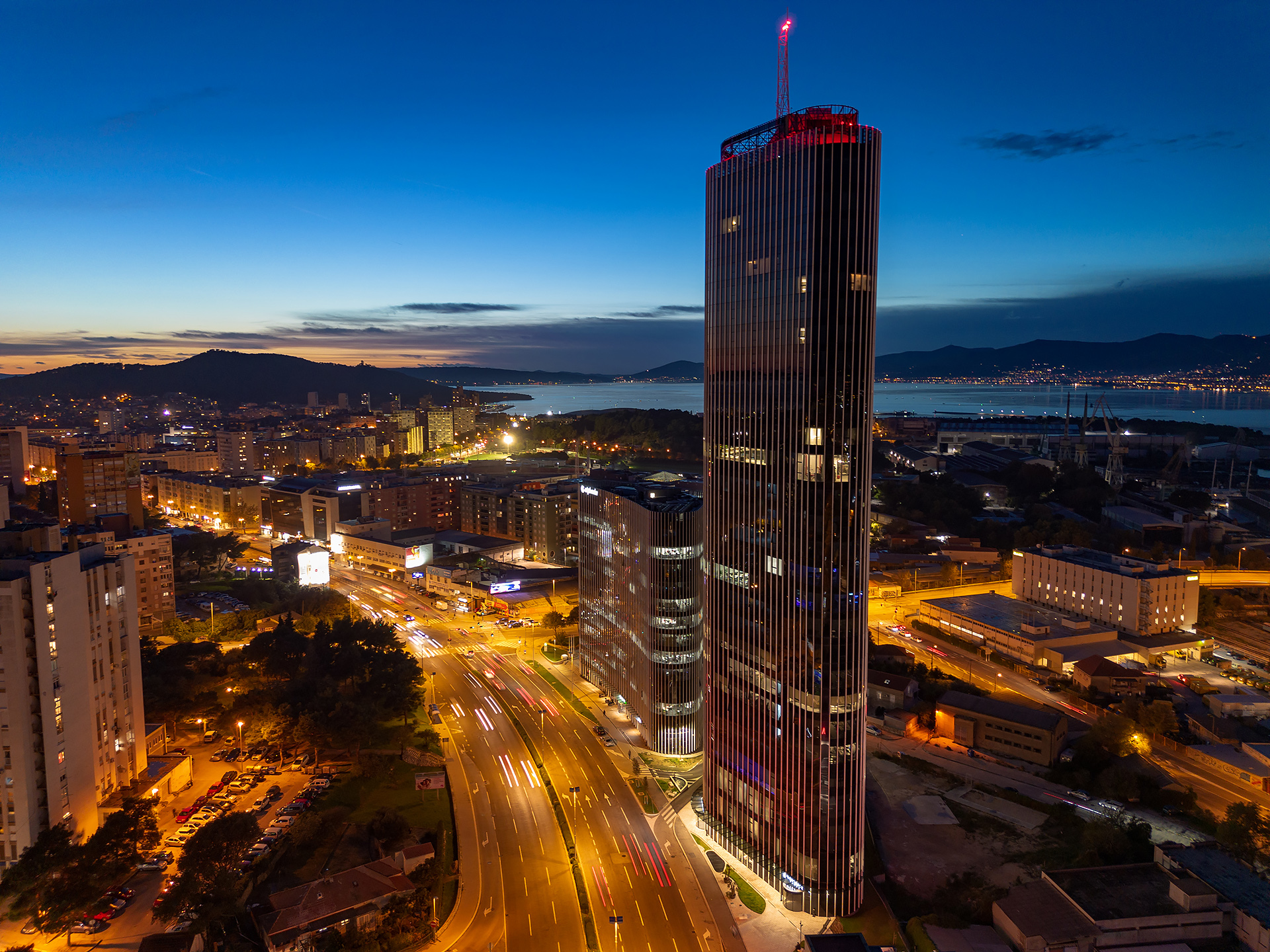
Dalmatia Tower upon completion, 2024

The façade consists of high-performance glazed curtain wall panels designed to meet thermal performance and solar control requirements. The glazing provides ultraviolet protection while maintaining transparency from the interior. The architectural design is characterised by a simple monolithic form and a glazed curtain wall façade with vertically emphasised proportions. The building's appearance is defined by its uninterrupted vertical composition and restrained architectural detailing.

The external appearance is defined by continuous vertical glazing elements arranged in a narrow striped ("pinstripe") pattern, emphasising the building's vertical proportions. Earlier design studies considered a white façade before the darker glazed solution was adopted.

=== Construction ===
Construction of the façade was carried out simultaneously with the erection of the reinforced concrete structure. Façade installation began after the structure had reached approximately the fifteenth floor, allowing interior fit-out works to commence before completion of the structural frame.

The reinforced concrete frame was constructed in alternating sections to optimise the use of formwork. Construction of each structural floor required approximately twenty days.

=== Interior ===
The lower tower houses the headquarters of OTP Bank Croatia, while the taller tower contains the AC Hotel by Marriott Split, the first Marriott-branded hotel in Croatia. The hotel occupies 15 floors and includes 210 guest rooms and four suites, together with conference facilities with a total capacity of approximately 300 people, a spa and wellness centre with an indoor swimming pool and fitness centre, an à la carte restaurant, a bar and a lounge.

The hotel interior was designed in accordance with the operational standards of AC Hotel by Marriott. The interior design was prepared by Atellior Studio for Architecture and Interior Design.

The project architect participated in the design of the principal entrance spaces, the selection of materials for the hotel and office lobbies, and the landscape design surrounding the building.

== Technical information ==
Dalmatia Tower is ranked 1st by height in Croatia, surpassing Strojarska Business Center in Zagreb. It is 112 meters (367 feet) tall, and has 27 floors. There is a 22-meter-tall (72 ft) antenna on the roof, which increases the height of the tower to 135 meters (443 feet). There are five underground levels, used for parking spaces.

The building is served by eight elevators. Four elevators serve floors 3 to 15 where the office space is located and the remaining four elevators serve floors 1, 2 and 16 to 27, which is occupied by AC Hotels by Marriott hotel, with the restaurant occupying the first floor, the congress centre occupying the second floor, spa, pool and fitness occupying the 16th floor and the rest being used by the hotel rooms.

In late 2017 Westgate project received an International Property Award for the best office high-rise in Europe.

== Gallery ==
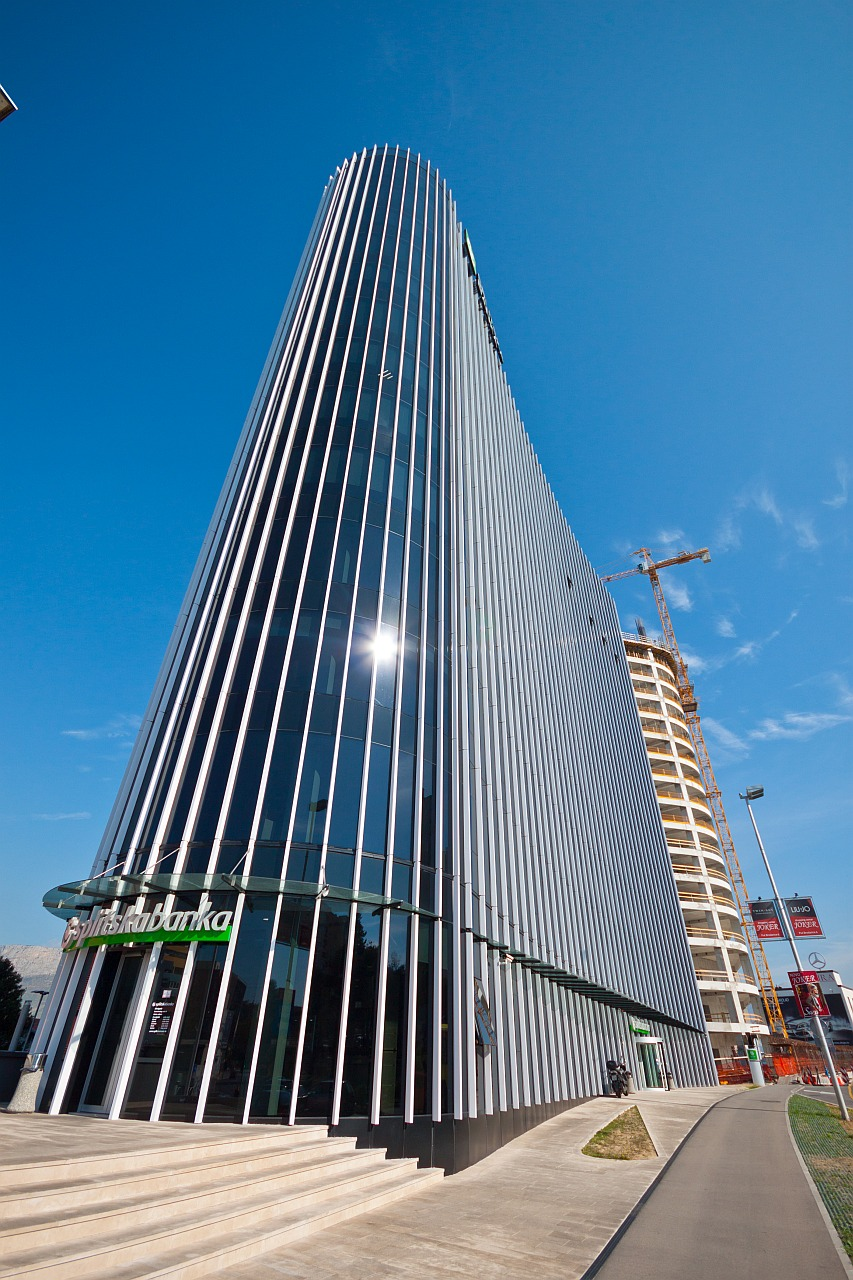
Westgate Tower A during the day

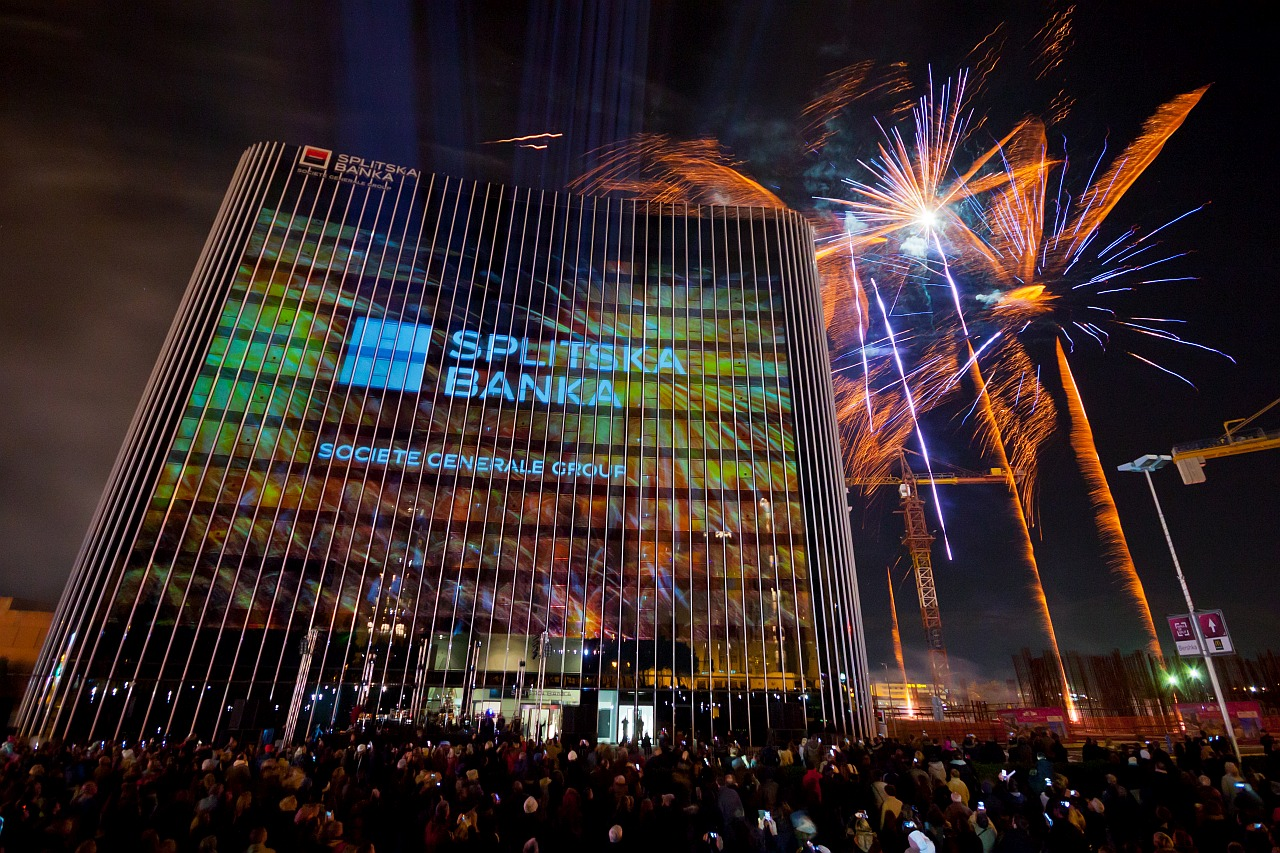
Westgate Tower A grand opening

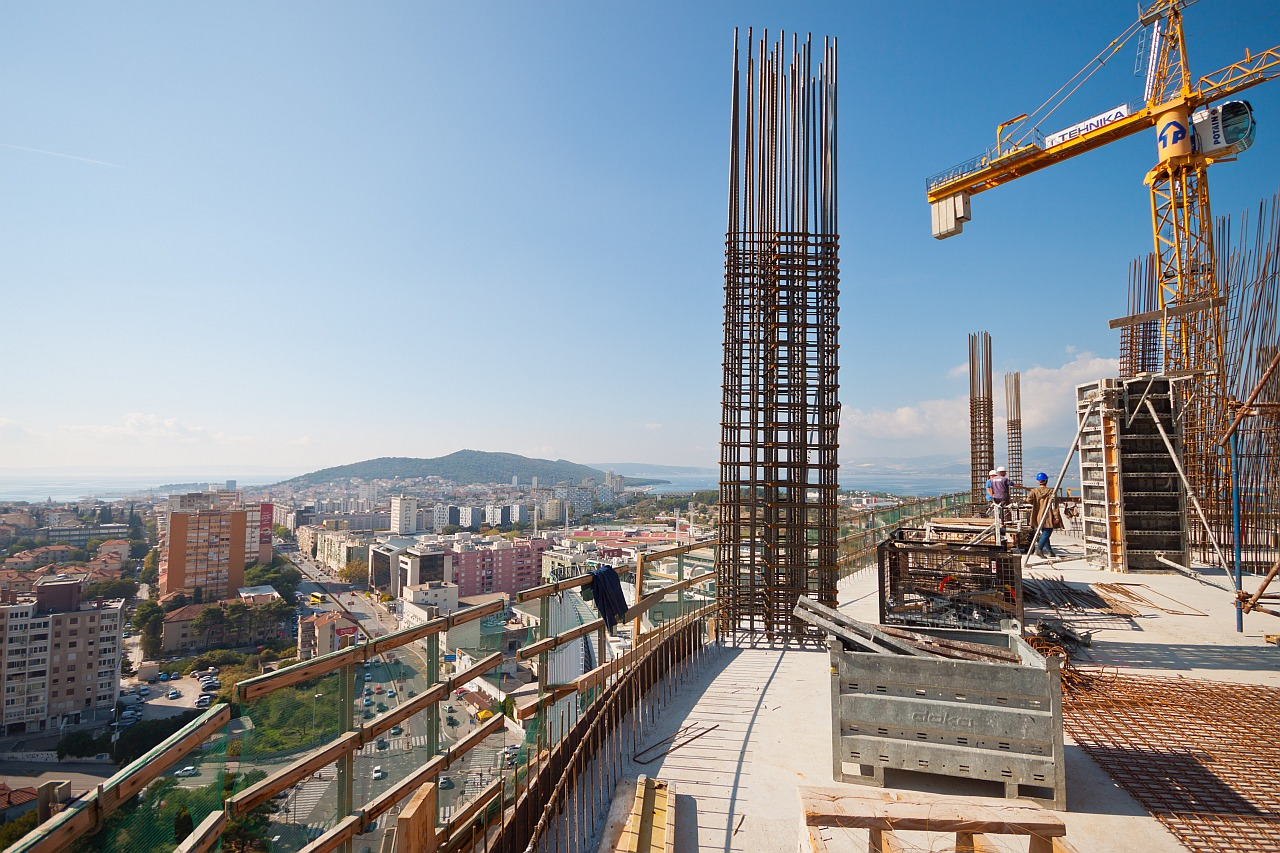
Westgate Tower B (Dalmatia Tower) under construction, view from the 16th floor

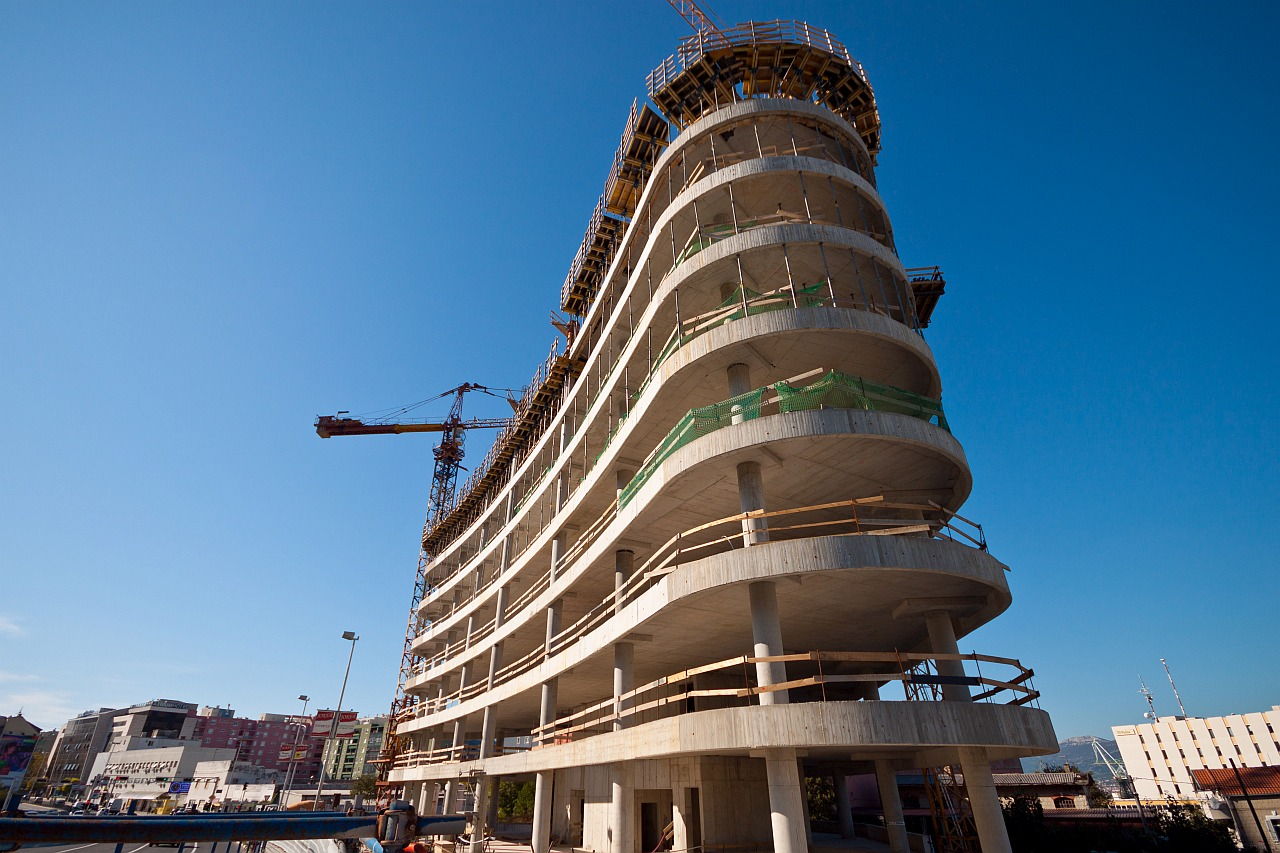
Westgate Tower A under construction

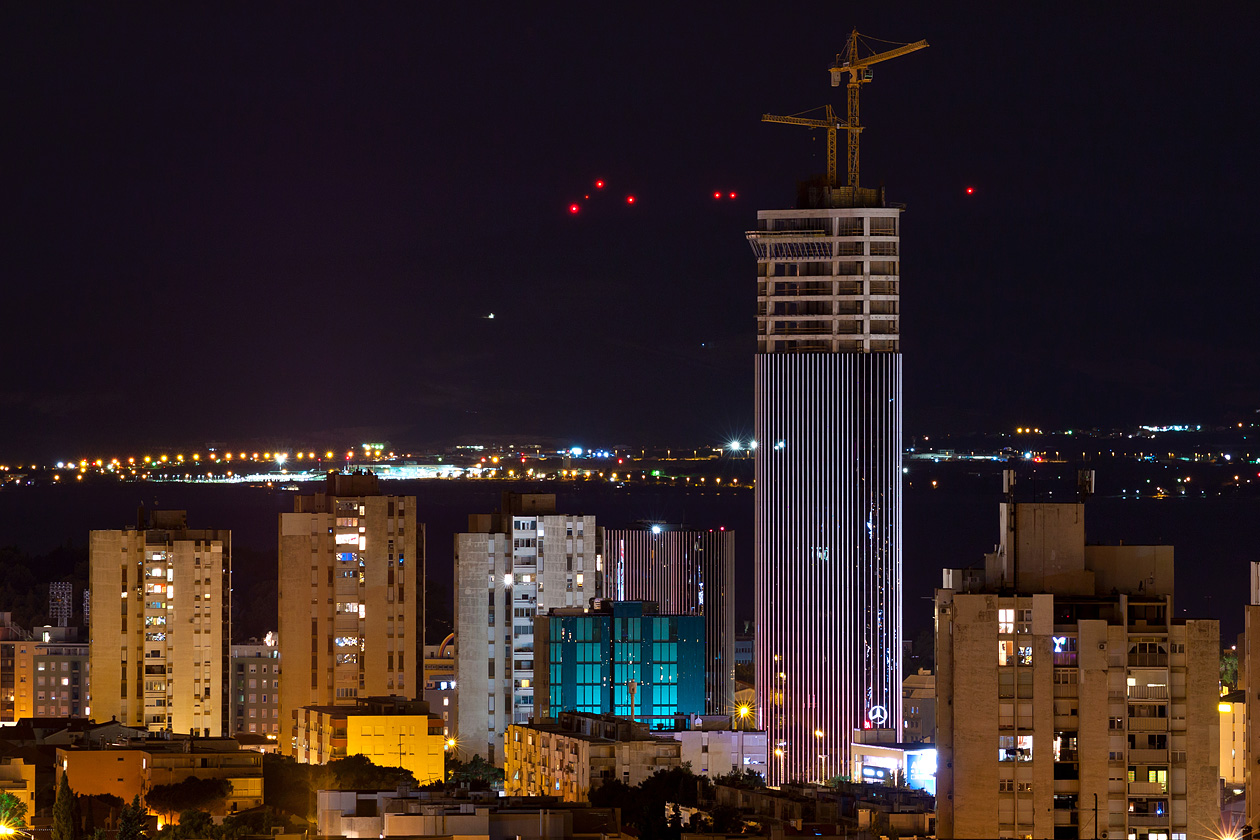
Westgate Tower B (Dalmatia Tower) with the last floor being finished

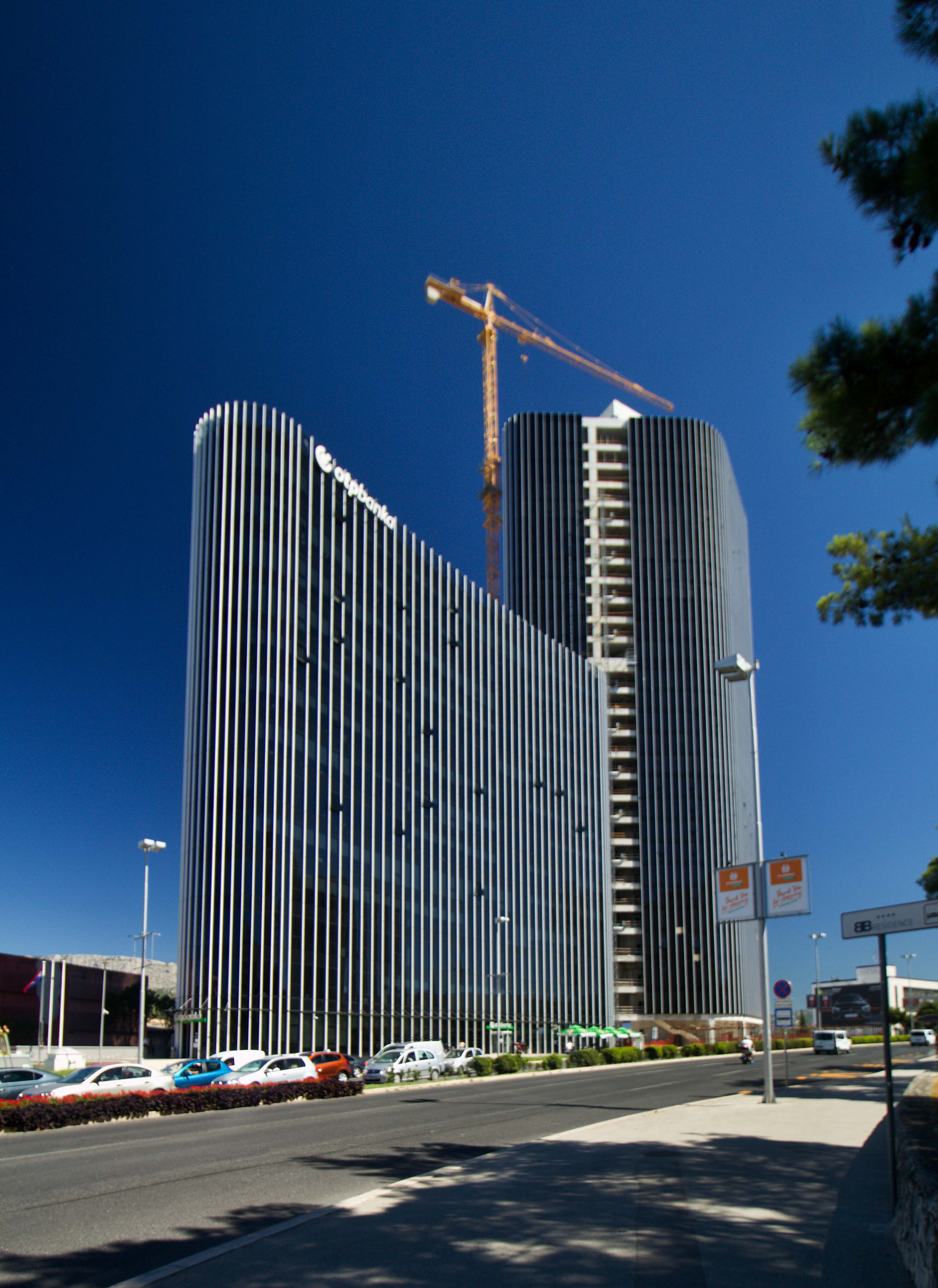
Towers under construction in 2020

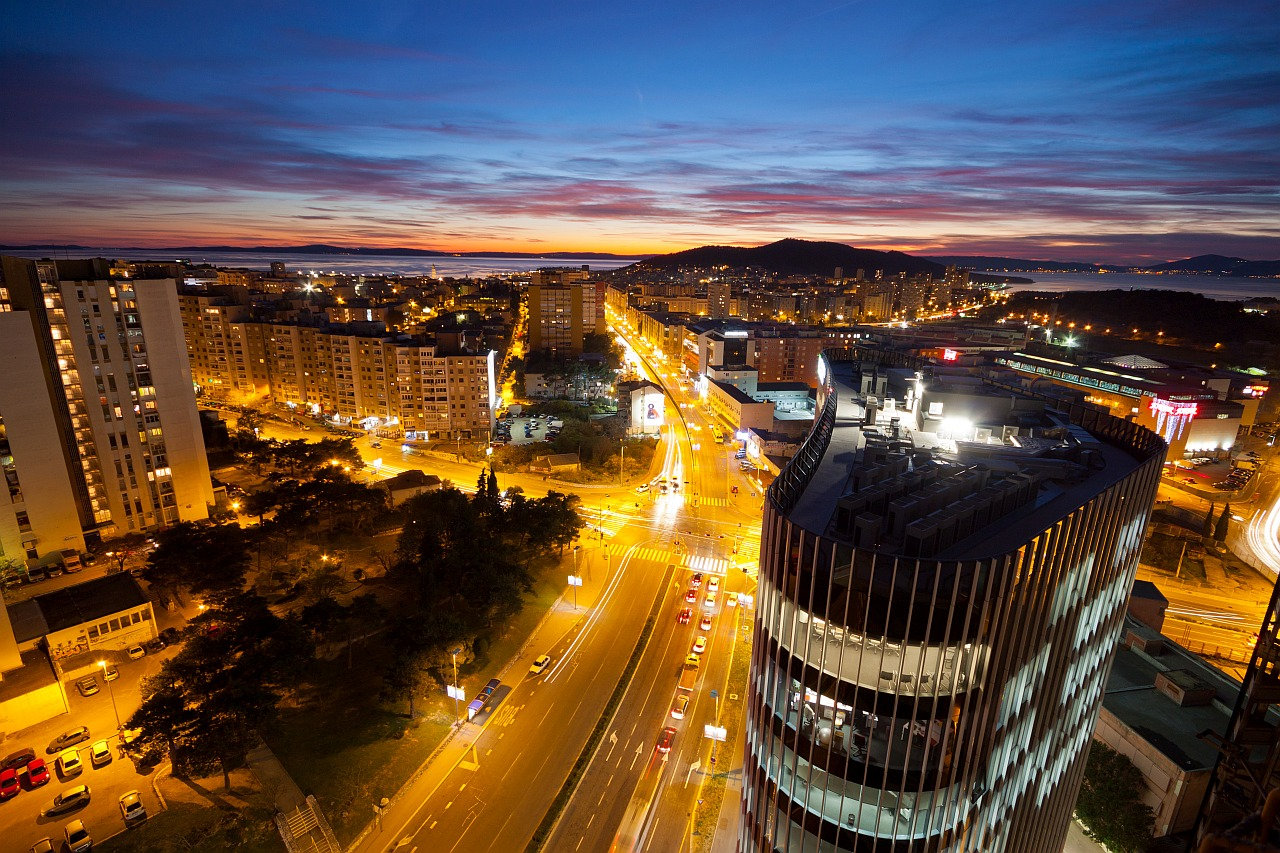
Westgate Tower B (Dalmatia Tower) night view from the 17th floor

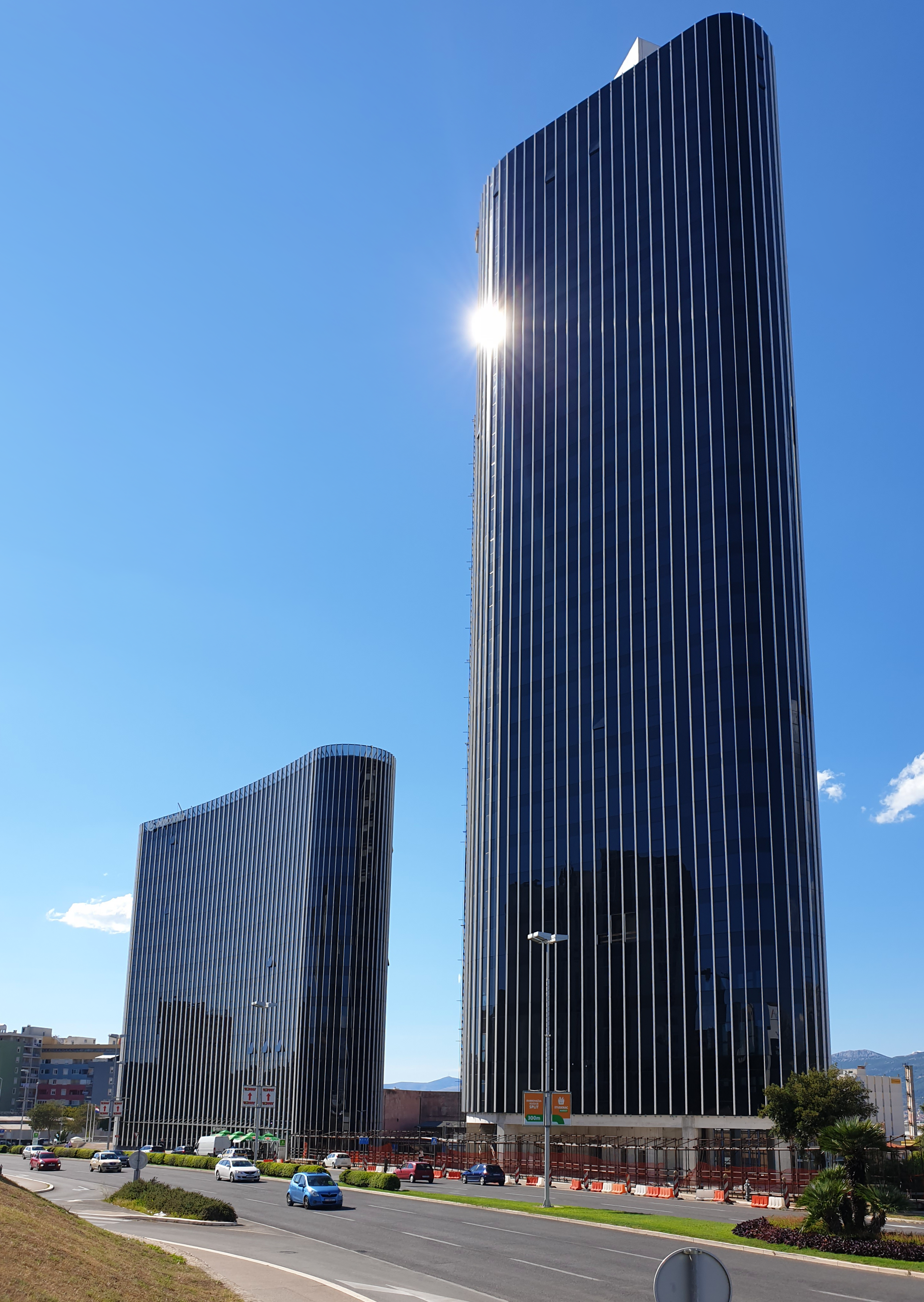
The Tower in 2020

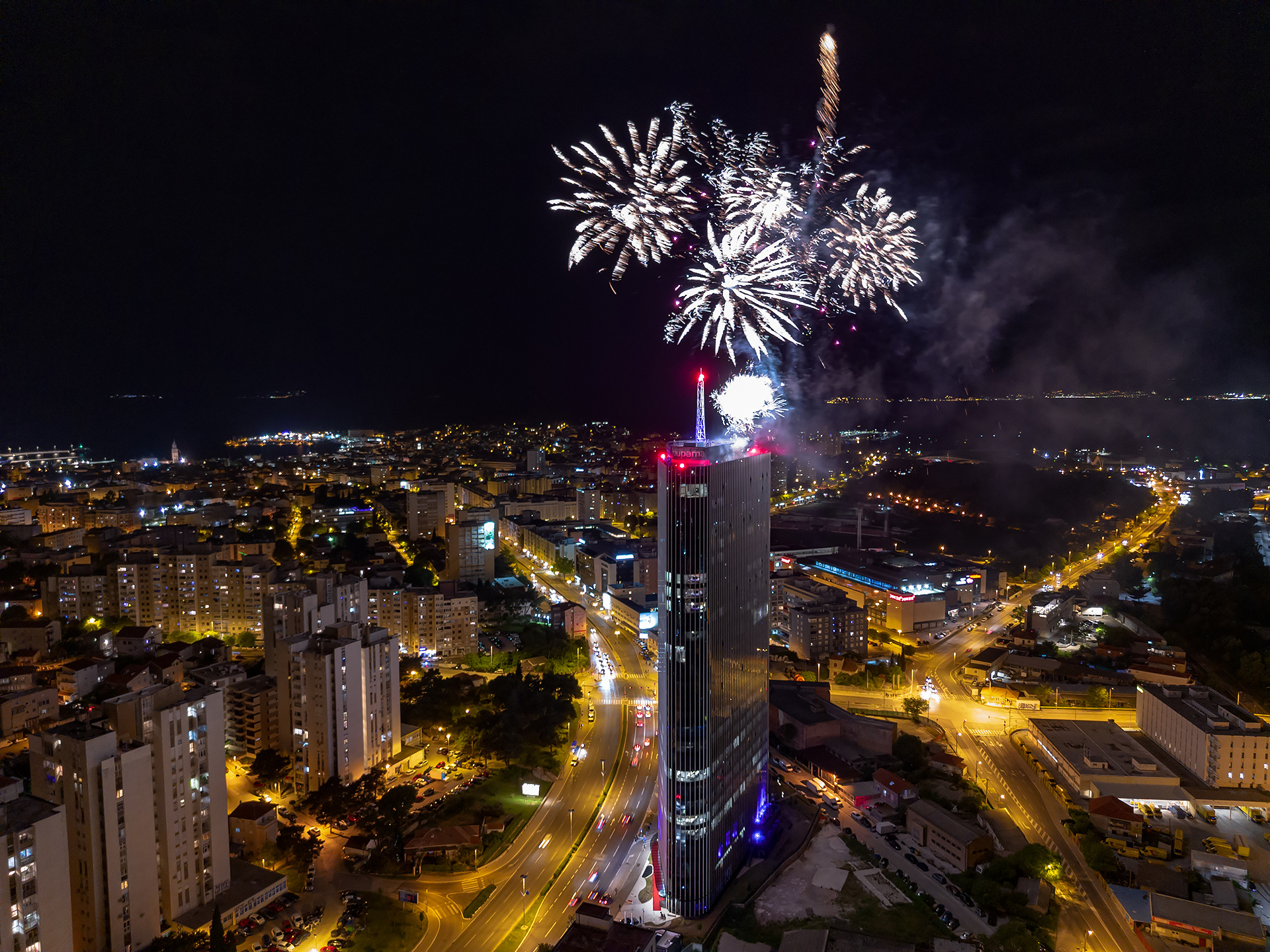
Westgate Tower B opening fireworks, 2024

== See also ==
- List of tallest buildings in Croatia
