= Zagrebtower =

Office tower in Zagreb, Croatia

Zagreb Tower
- Zagrebtower
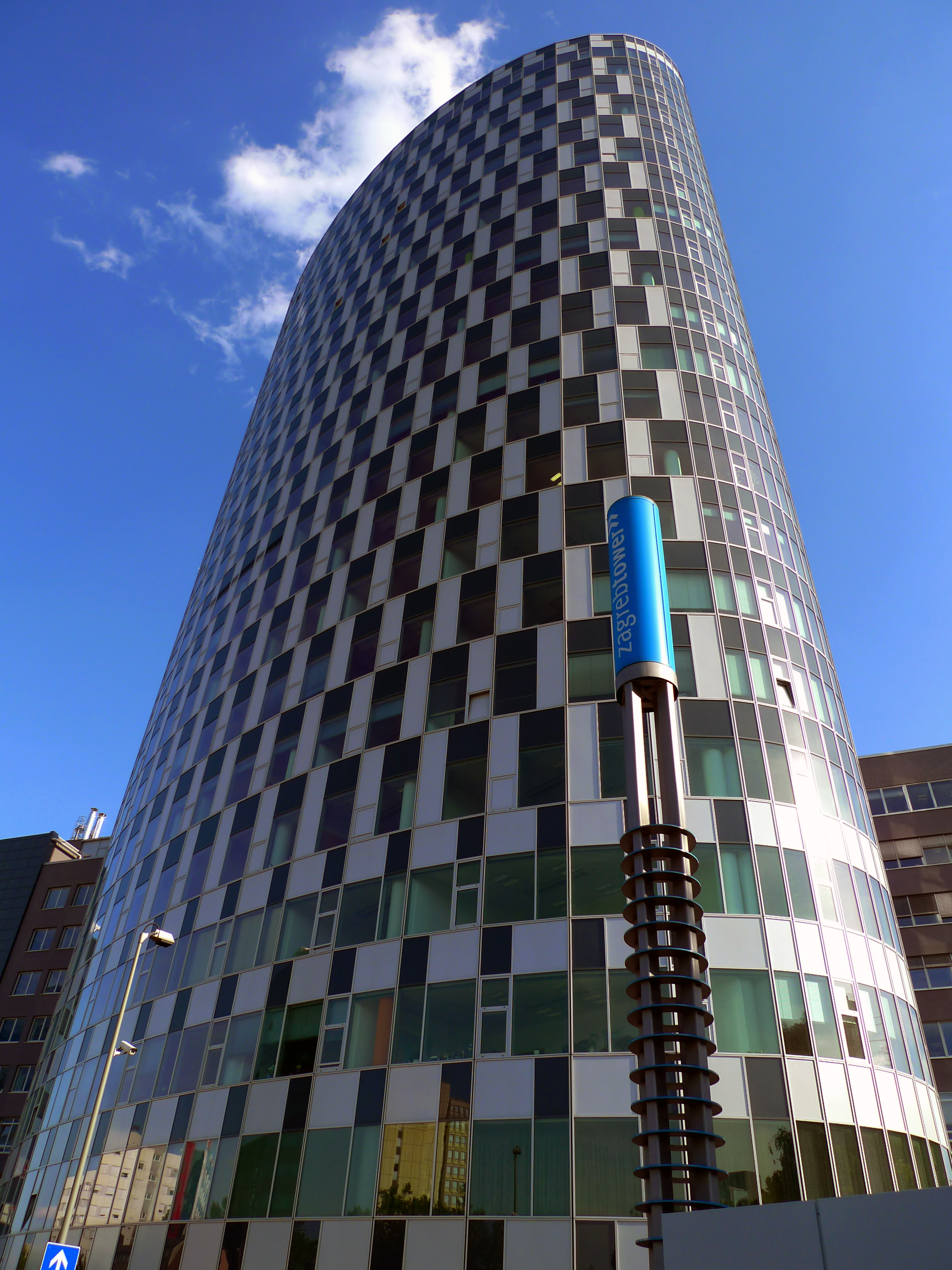
- Zagreb Tower in Zagreb
- Interactive map of the Zagreb Tower area

General information
- Status: Completed
- Type: Office
- Architectural style: Modern
- Location: Radnička cesta 80, Zagreb, Croatia
- Construction started: 2004
- Completed: 2006
- Opened: 2006

Height
- Height: 79 m (259 ft)

Technical details
- Floor count: 22
- Floor area: 26,000 m²

Design and construction
- Architect: Sadar + Vuga
- Developer: TriGranit
- Main contractor: Tehnika d.d.

Other information
- Parking: 350

Zagrebtower is a building in Zagreb, Croatia, located in the neighborhood of Sigečica, on the Radnička Road. It was completed in late 2006.

It is an elliptical, 22-story, 79-meter (259 ft) office tower with adjacent 8-story office building which includes an underground parking garage. The complex includes a total of 26,000 m^{2} (280,000 sq ft) of office space.

== See also ==
- List of tallest buildings in Croatia

== Sources ==
- Nadilo, Branko (2006). "Zagrebtower na uglu Radničke ceste i Ulice grada Vukovara u Zagrebu" (PDF). Građevinar (in Croatian). 58 (3).
