= Osijek Co-cathedral =

- Church of St Peter and St Paul
- Konkatedrala sv. Petra i sv. Pavla
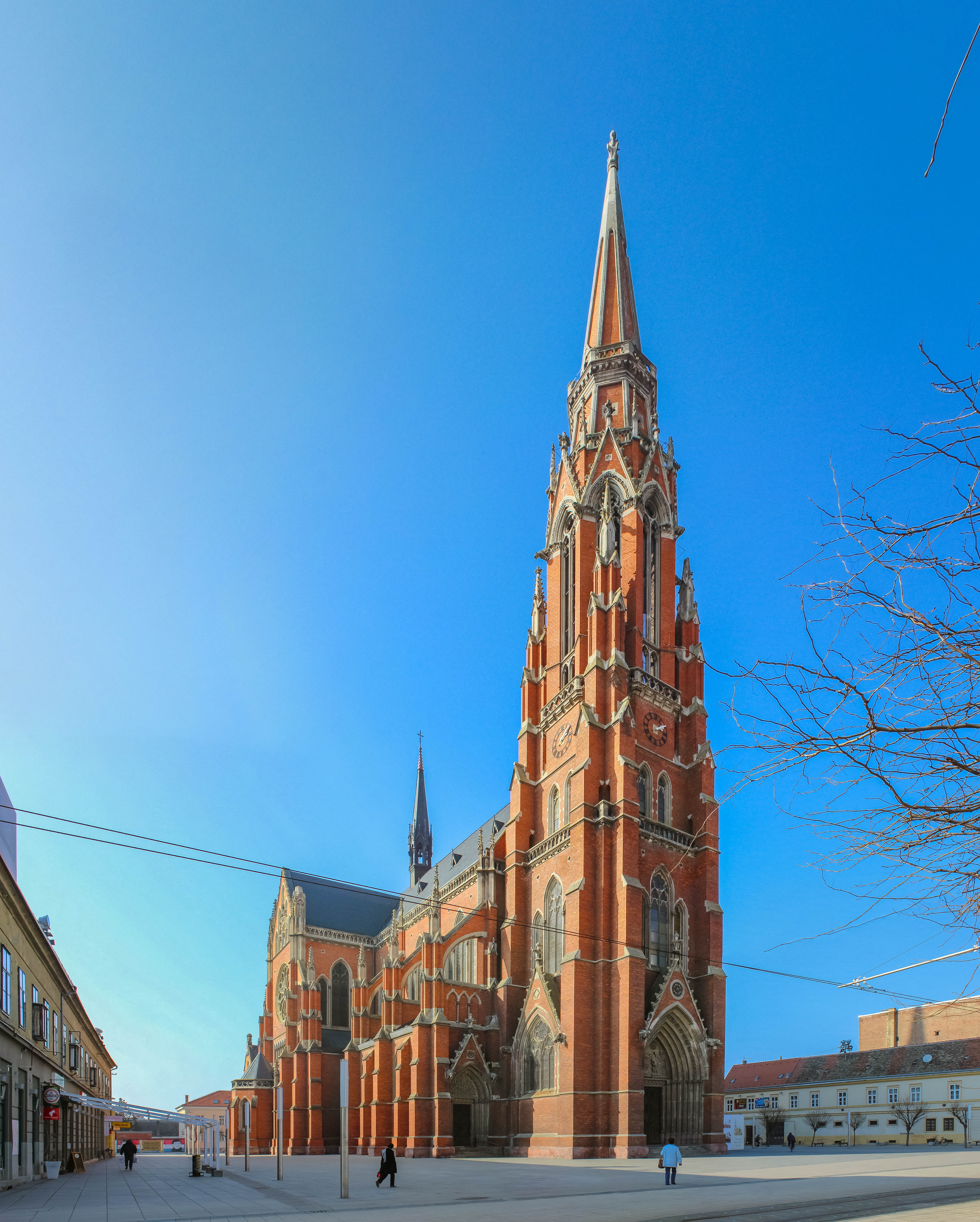
- Facade of the cathedral
- Osijek Co-cathedral
- 45°33′38″N 18°40′34″E
- Location: Osijek
- Country: Croatia
- Denomination: Roman Catholic
- Website: www.svpetaripavao.hr

Architecture
- Architect: Franz Langenberg
- Style: Neo-Gothic
- Completed: 1898

Specifications
- Capacity: 3,000
- Materials: brick and stone

The Church of St Peter and St Paul (Croatian: Crkva svetog Petra i Pavla), commonly referred to as the Osijek Co-cathedral (Croatian: Osječka konkatedrala), is a neo-Gothic co-cathedral of the Roman Catholic Archdiocese of Đakovo-Osijek, located in Osijek, Croatia. The multi-tiered 94-metre spire is one of the city's landmarks. The church was built in 1898 on the initiative of the Bishop of Đakovo Josip Juraj Strossmayer.

The church is entered via two small doors to the side of the main portal, overlooked by a trio of gargoyles. The interior is a treasure trove of neo-Gothic ornamentation, with a succession of pinnacled altars overlooked by exuberant stained glass windows. The interior was finished off in 1938–1942 when leading Croatian painter Mirko Rački covered the walls and ceilings with brightly coloured frescoes illustrating famous episodes from the Old and New Testaments.

== History ==
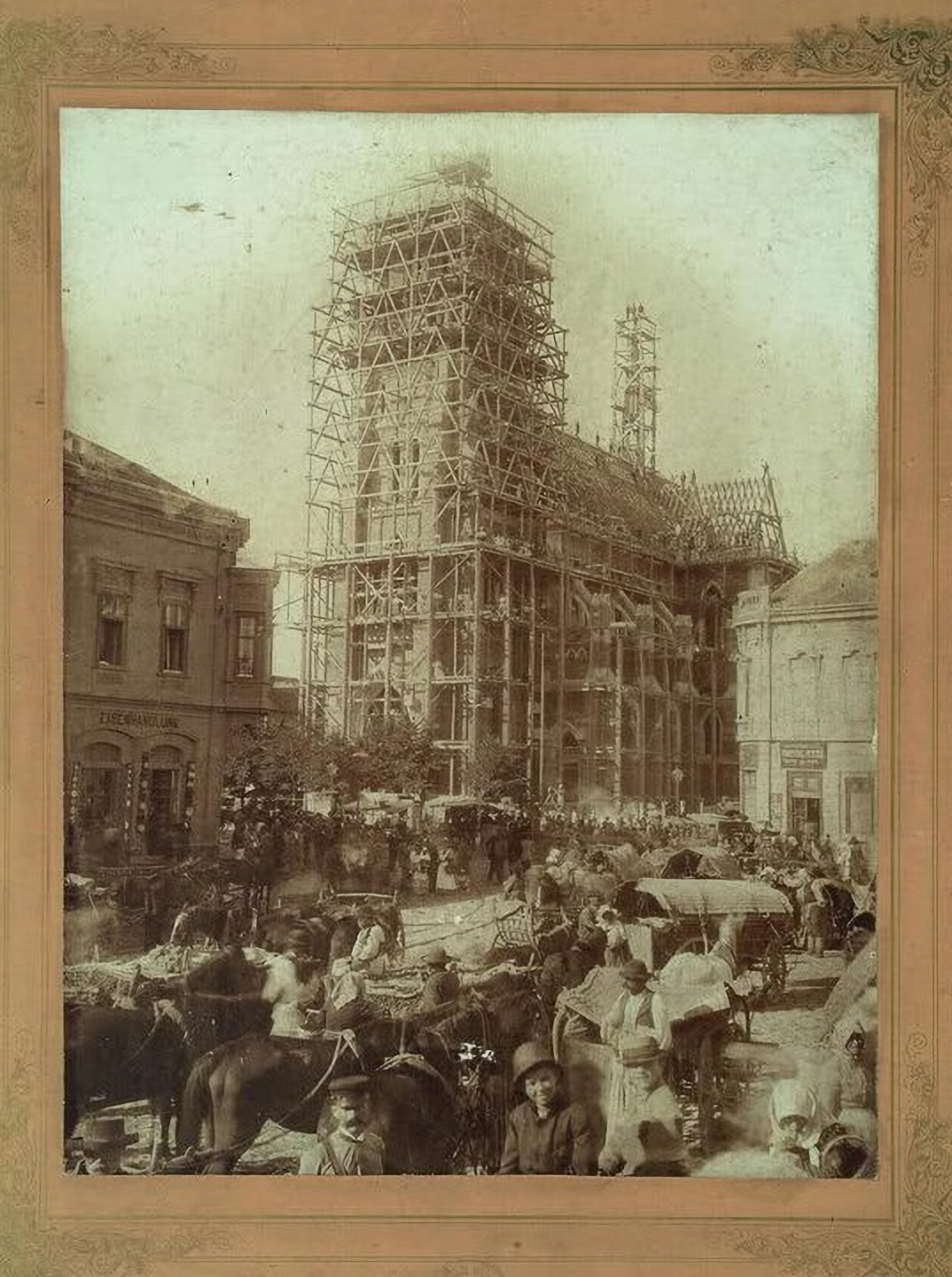
Cathedral during construction, 1898

The Co-Cathedral of St. Peter and St. Paul serves as the secondary cathedral of the Archdiocese of Đakovo-Osijek and stands as one of the most prominent and recognisable landmarks of the city of Osijek. Built in the Neo-Gothic style at the end of the 19th century, it represents a major architectural and religious monument of eastern Croatia.

The construction of the Osijek Co-Cathedral was initiated by Bishop Josip Juraj Strossmayer, a native of Osijek and then head of the Diocese of Đakovo and Srijem. In 1866, Strossmayer first proposed the idea of building a new parish church for the Upper Town (Gornji grad). At that time, the existing parish church, built in 1732, had become too small and architecturally modest in comparison with the growing and modernising city. The parish’s patron, the City of Osijek, formally determined the means of financing the new church in 1870, but progress remained slow until the appointment of a new parish priest, Josip Horvat, who accelerated the process.

An architectural competition was announced in 1892, and the winning design was submitted by the German architect Franz Langenberg. The old church was demolished in 1894, and construction of the new, grand Neo-Gothic church began. The building features a 94-metre-high bell tower and a three-aisled basilican plan, covering a total floor area of 1,062 square metres. The exterior was completed in 1898, after which interior decoration continued. The church was consecrated on 20 May 1900 by Bishop Strossmayer himself.

The interior was finally completed between 1938 and 1942, when the leading Croatian painter Mirko Rački adorned the walls and ceilings with vivid frescoes depicting key episodes from the Old and New Testaments. The church’s interior is a true treasury of Neo-Gothic ornamentation, featuring a series of elaborately designed altars and stained-glass windows with biblical scenes.

With the height of 94 m, the Osijek Co-Cathedral is the second largest church in Croatia, following Zagreb. Its construction required approximately three and a half million red bricks, and its tower houses four bells weighing 2,665 kg, 1,552 kg, 740 kg, and 331 kg respectively.

During the Croatian War of Independence in 1991, the co-cathedral sustained over 100 direct hits from projectiles. Despite the damage, liturgical services continued throughout the war. Since then, the church has been undergoing continuous restoration, both internally and externally.

Until 18 June 2008, the church functioned solely as the Parish church of Sts. Peter and Paul. With the establishment of the Archdiocese and Metropolitan See of Đakovo-Osijek, it was elevated to the rank of Co-cathedral, becoming the secondary episcopal seat of the Archbishop of Đakovo-Osijek. This designation officially recognised both the city of Osijek and its most prominent church as integral parts of the archdiocesan structure alongside the historic see in Đakovo.

Today, the Co-Cathedral of Sts. Peter and Paul is an indispensable landmark of Osijek and a central destination for pilgrims, scholars, and tourists, forming an essential part of the religious, cultural, and historical heritage of eastern Croatia.

== Gallery ==
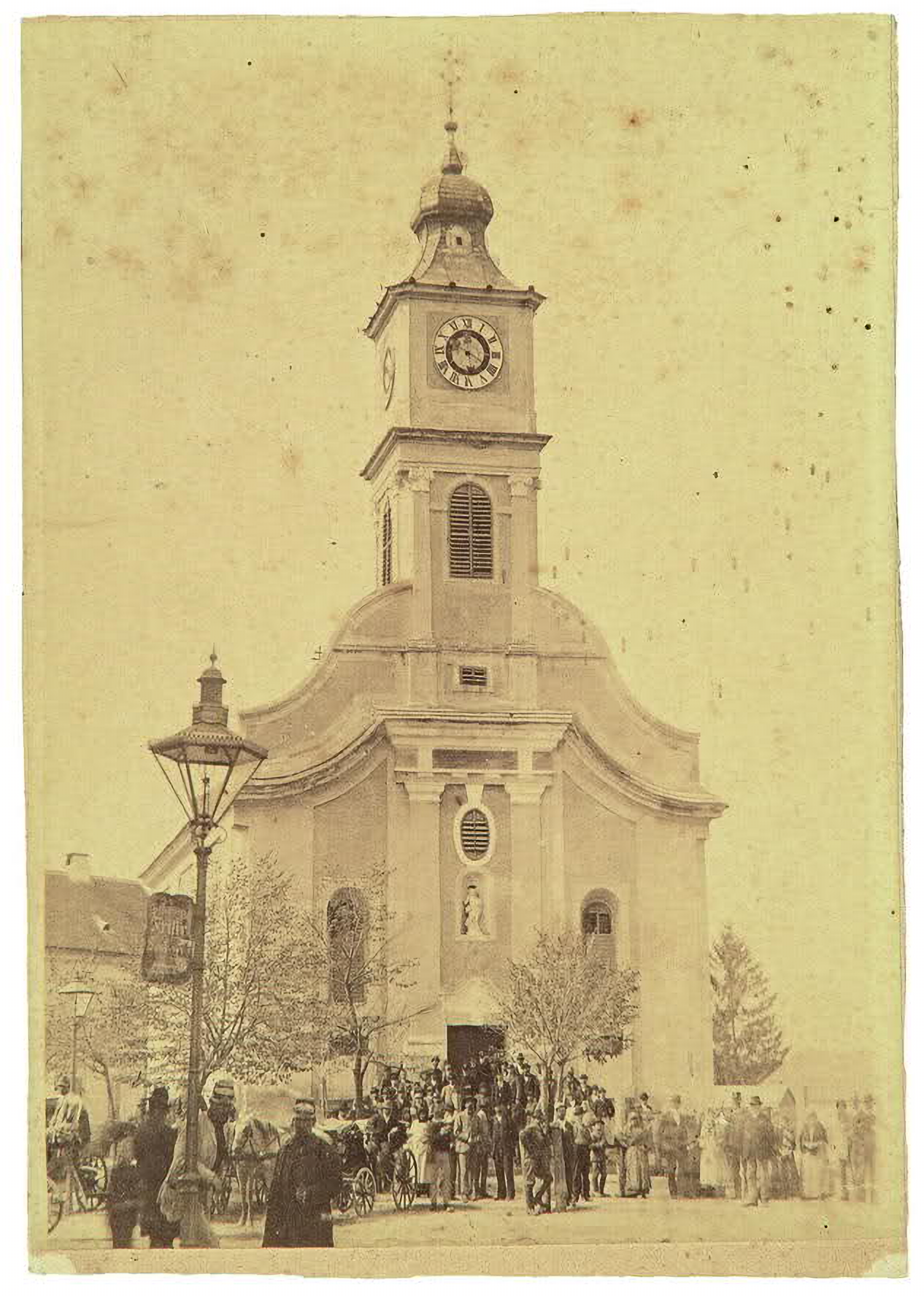
Older baroque church that was demolished in order to construct new neo-gothic co-cathedral

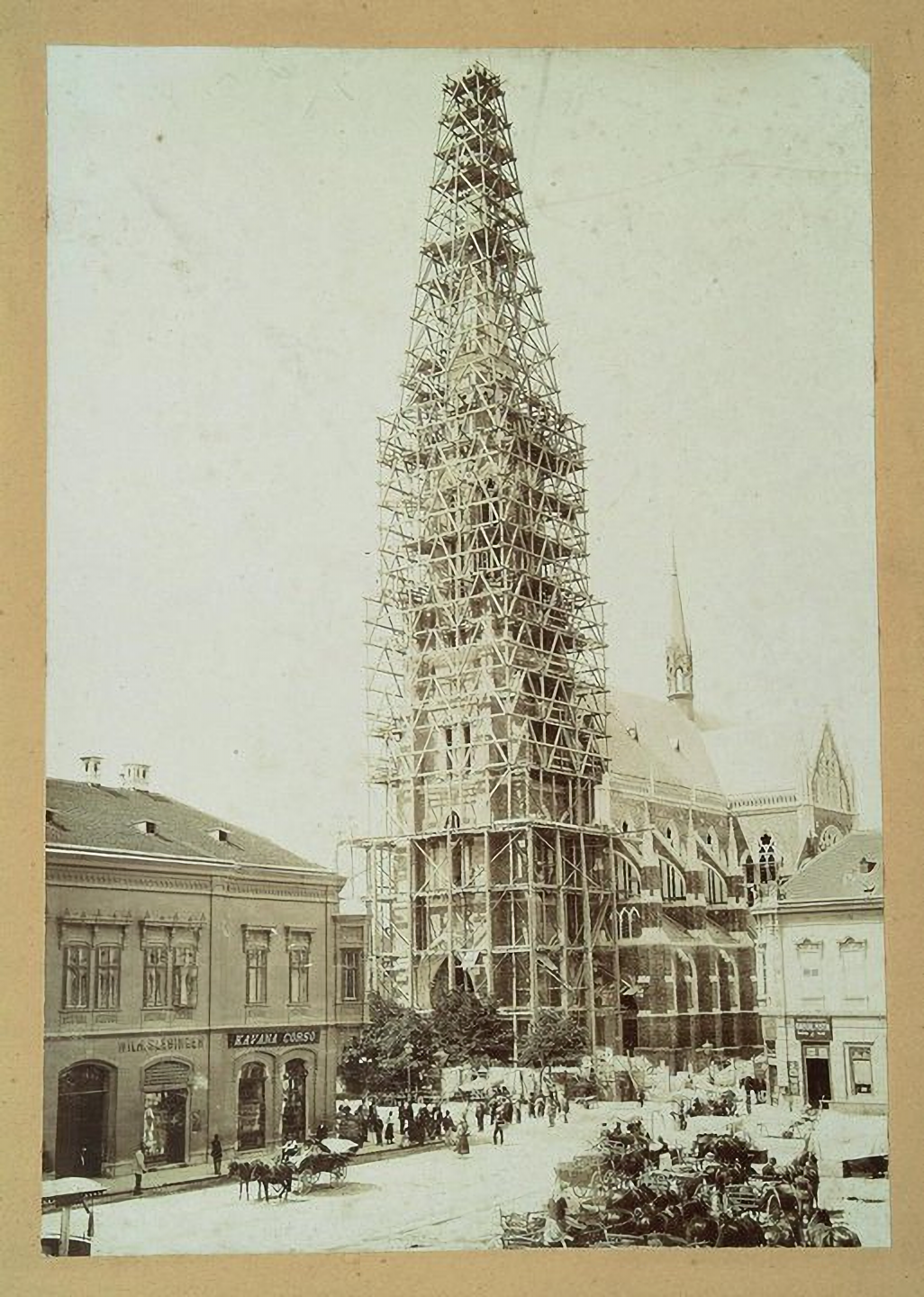
Construction of the co-cathedral in 1898

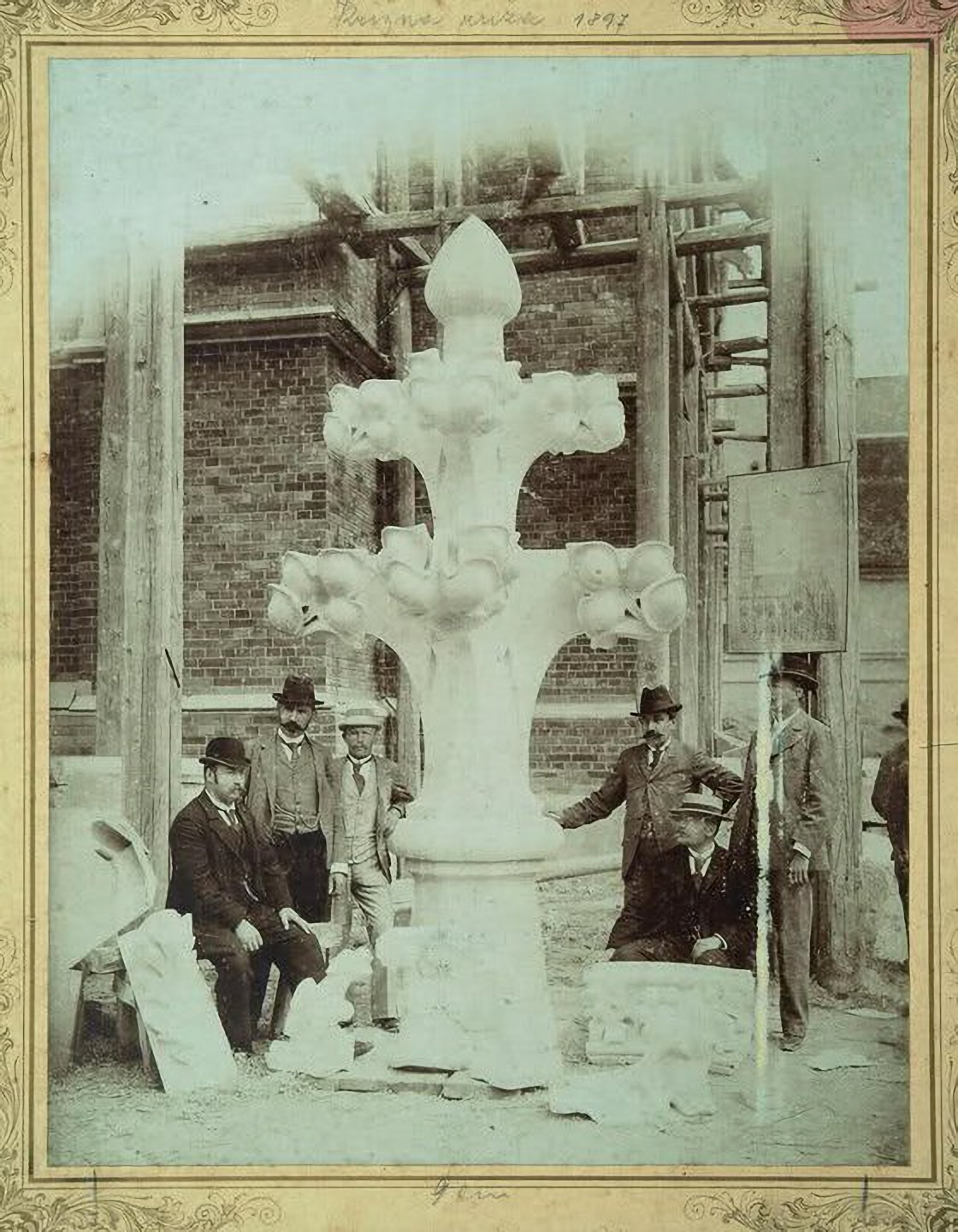
The top of the co-cathedral before mounting

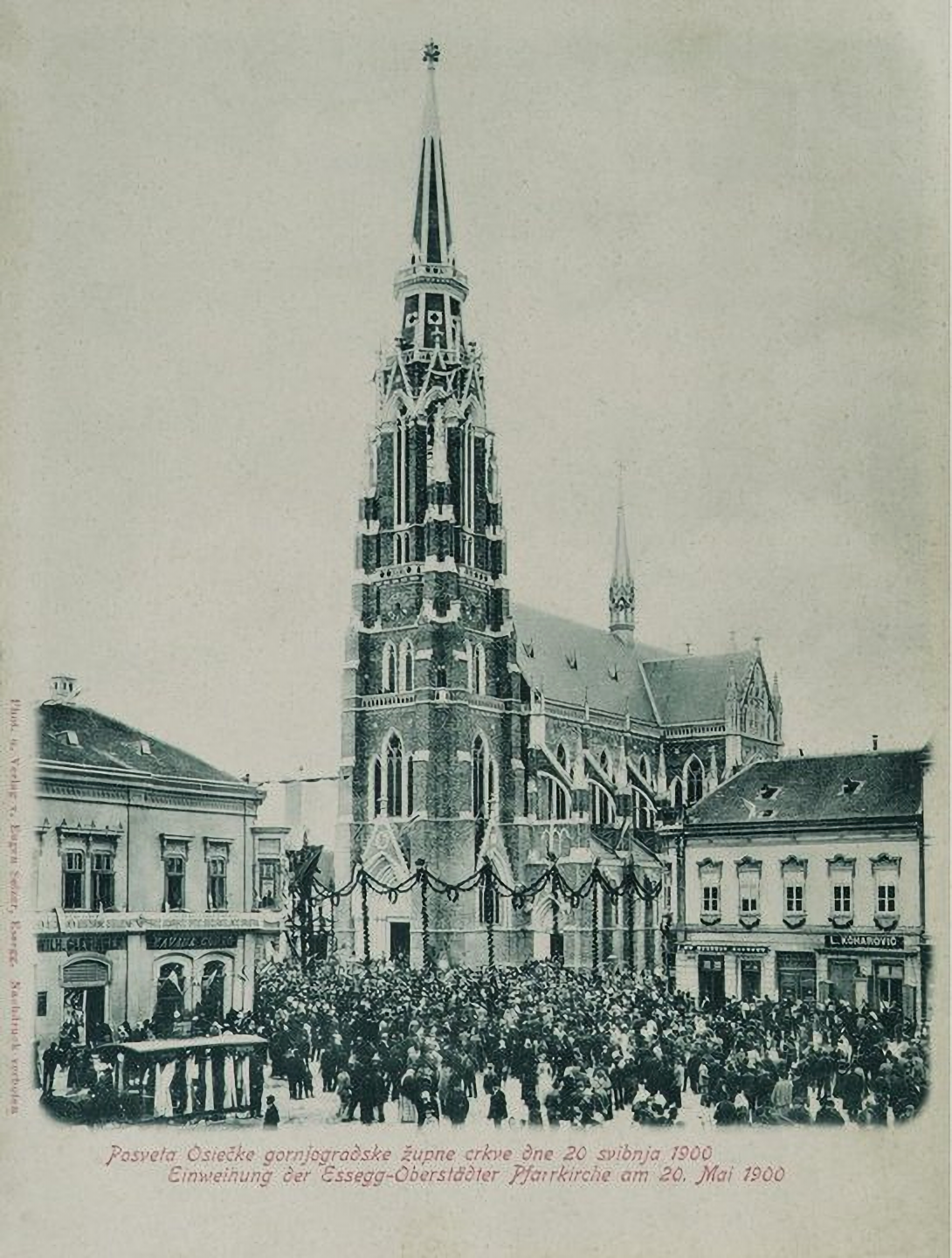
Consecration of the co-cathedral on May 20, 1900

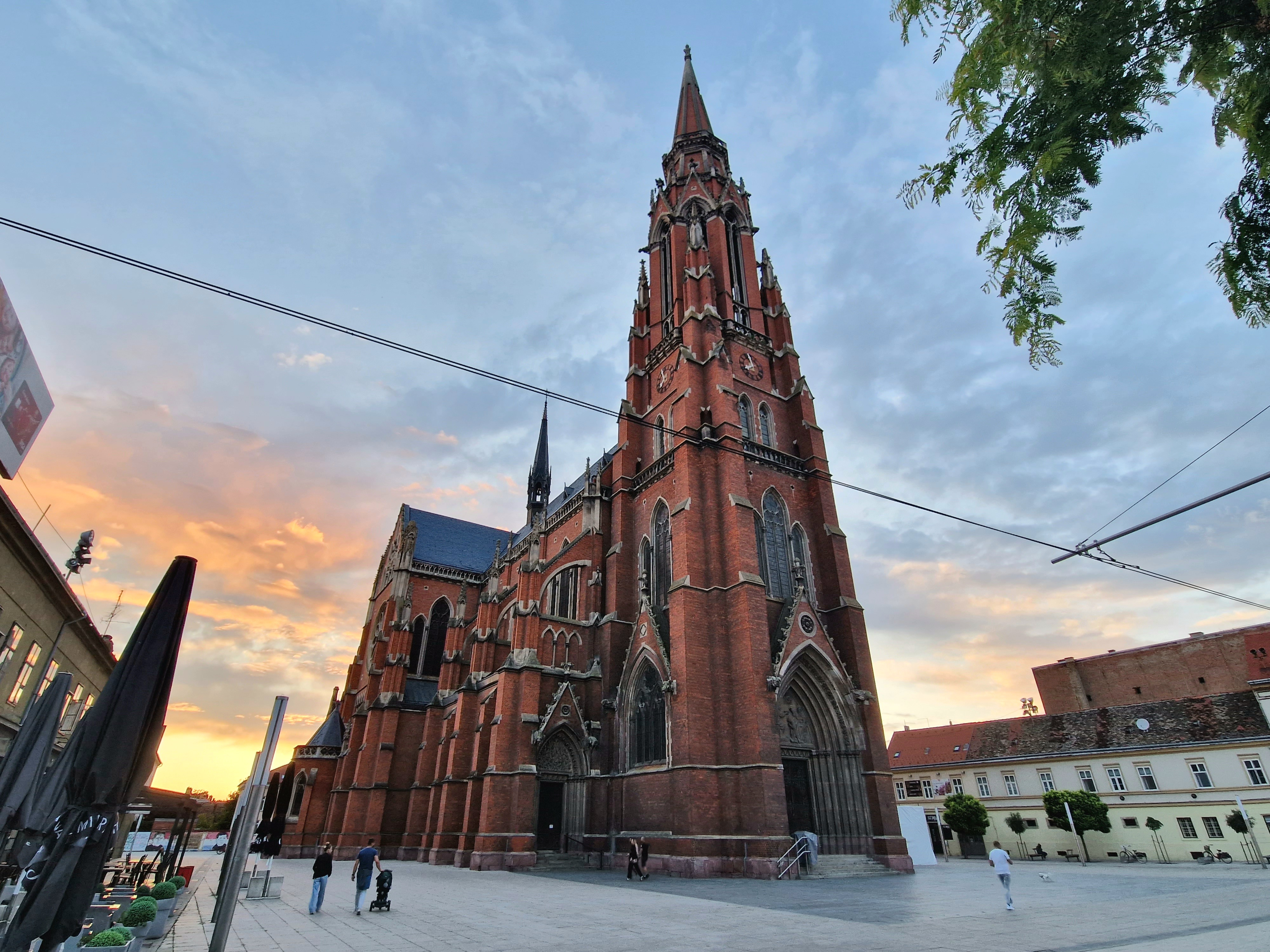
Co-cathedral today

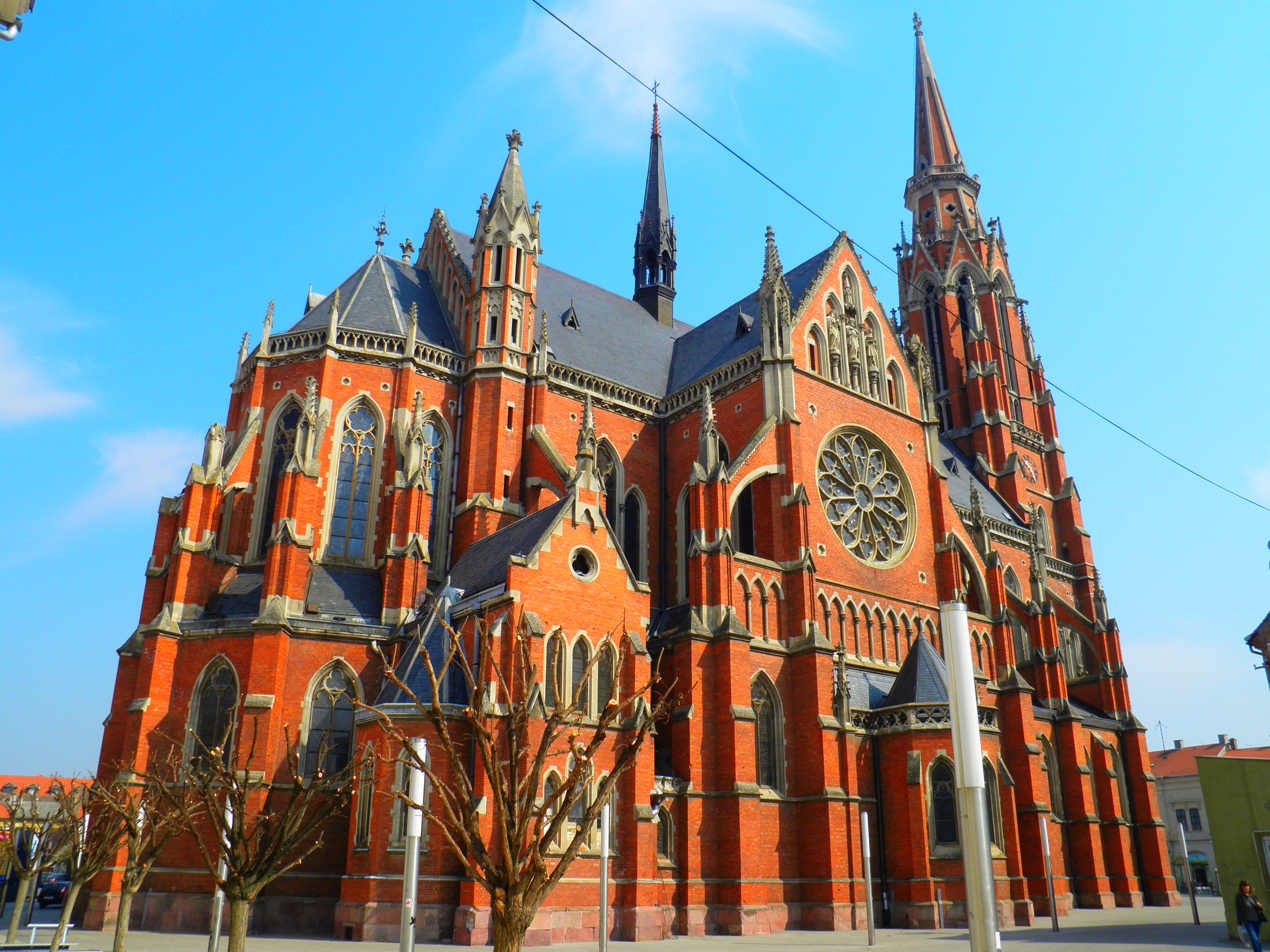
Side view

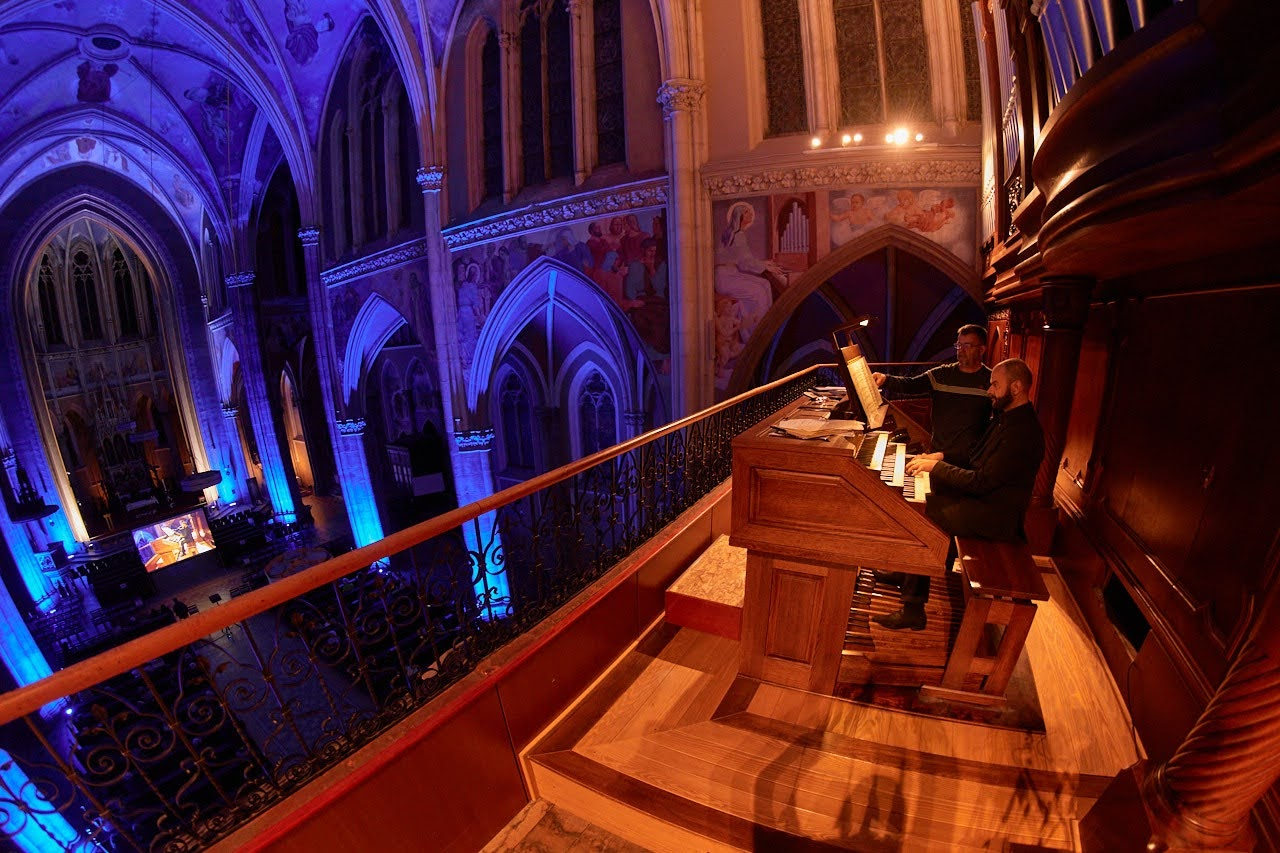
Easter concert on the cathedral organ, 2023

== See also ==
- List of tallest structures built before the 20th century
- List of tallest buildings in Croatia
