= Strojarska Business Center =

Center in Zagreb, Croatia

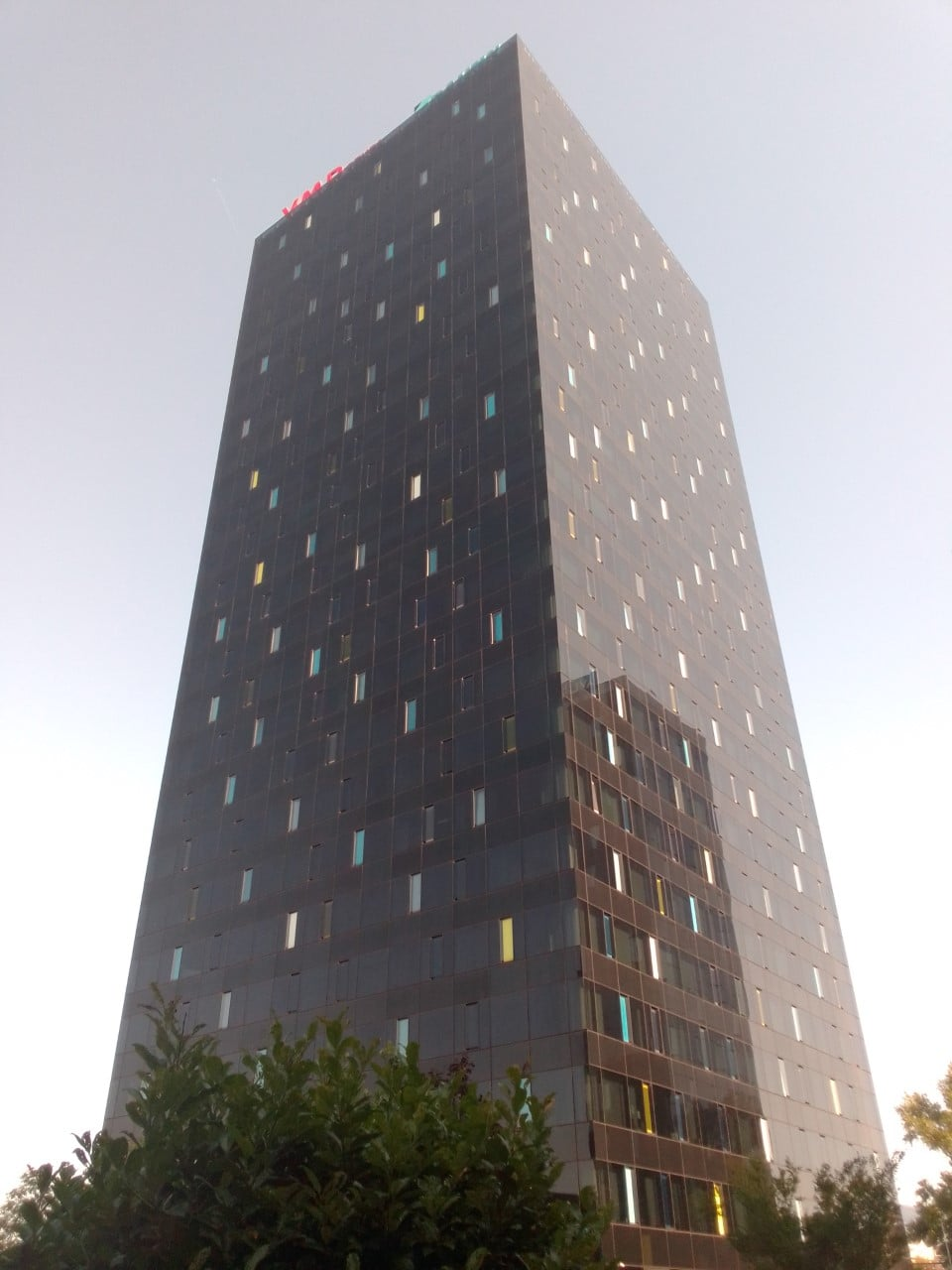
- Skyscraper in 2020
- Interactive map of the Strojarska Business Center area

Record height
- Tallest in Croatia from 2015 to 2023^{[I]}
- Preceded by: Eurotower
- Surpassed by: Dalmatia Tower

General information
- Status: Completed
- Type: Mixed-use
- Architectural style: Modern
- Location: Kruge, Trnje, Zagreb, Croatia
- Construction started: 2015
- Completed: 2015
- Opening: 2015
- Owner: VMD

Height
- Architectural: 96 m (315 ft)
- Tip: 96 m (315 ft)
- Roof: 96 m (315 ft)
- Top floor: 96 m (315 ft) (Level 25)

Technical details
- Floor count: 25 above ground 1 under ground

Design and construction
- Main contractor: VMD

Other information
- Parking: 635

Strojarska Business Center is a commercial and residential center in Zagreb, Croatia. The center has 6 buildings, two of which are residential buildings. There are two skyscrapers in the center. The main building, Building B, which has 25 floors and is 96 meters tall is the tallest building in Zagreb and second tallest in Croatia, after Dalmatia Tower in Split. The complex is called the VMD area.

All buildings have been completed. Skyscraper of 25 floors occupied by the end of 2014, while other buildings inhabited earlier.

Business center Strojarska has garages on 4 underground levels for 850 cars. The project is worth about 750 million. On the part of the land between the building and the bus station will be regulated by a public park and playground.

The building is current headquarters for Oracle, Hrvatska Poštanska Banka, Toshiba, Schuco, Unilever, Microblink and many more.

== Gallery ==
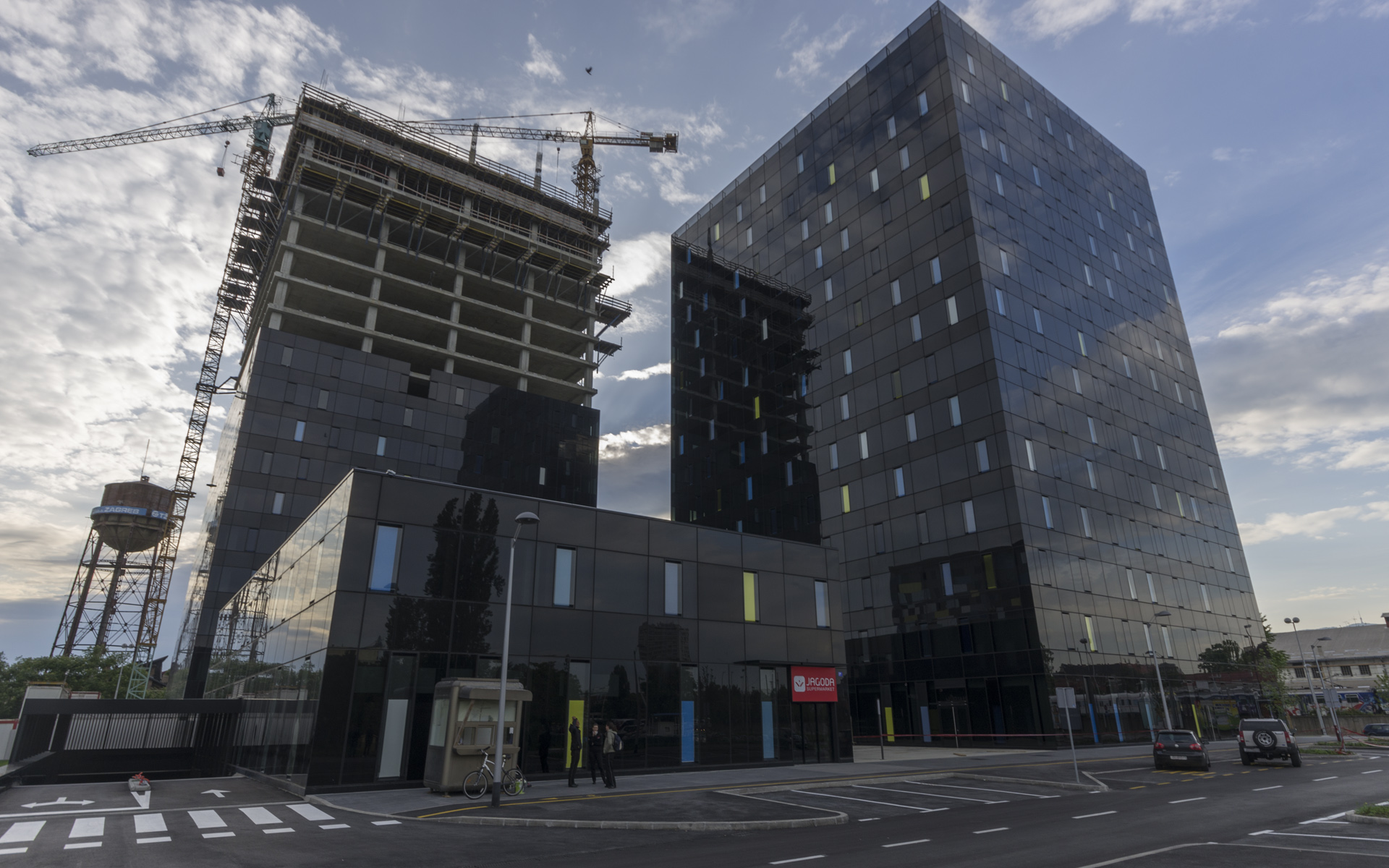
Skyscraper under construction in 2014.

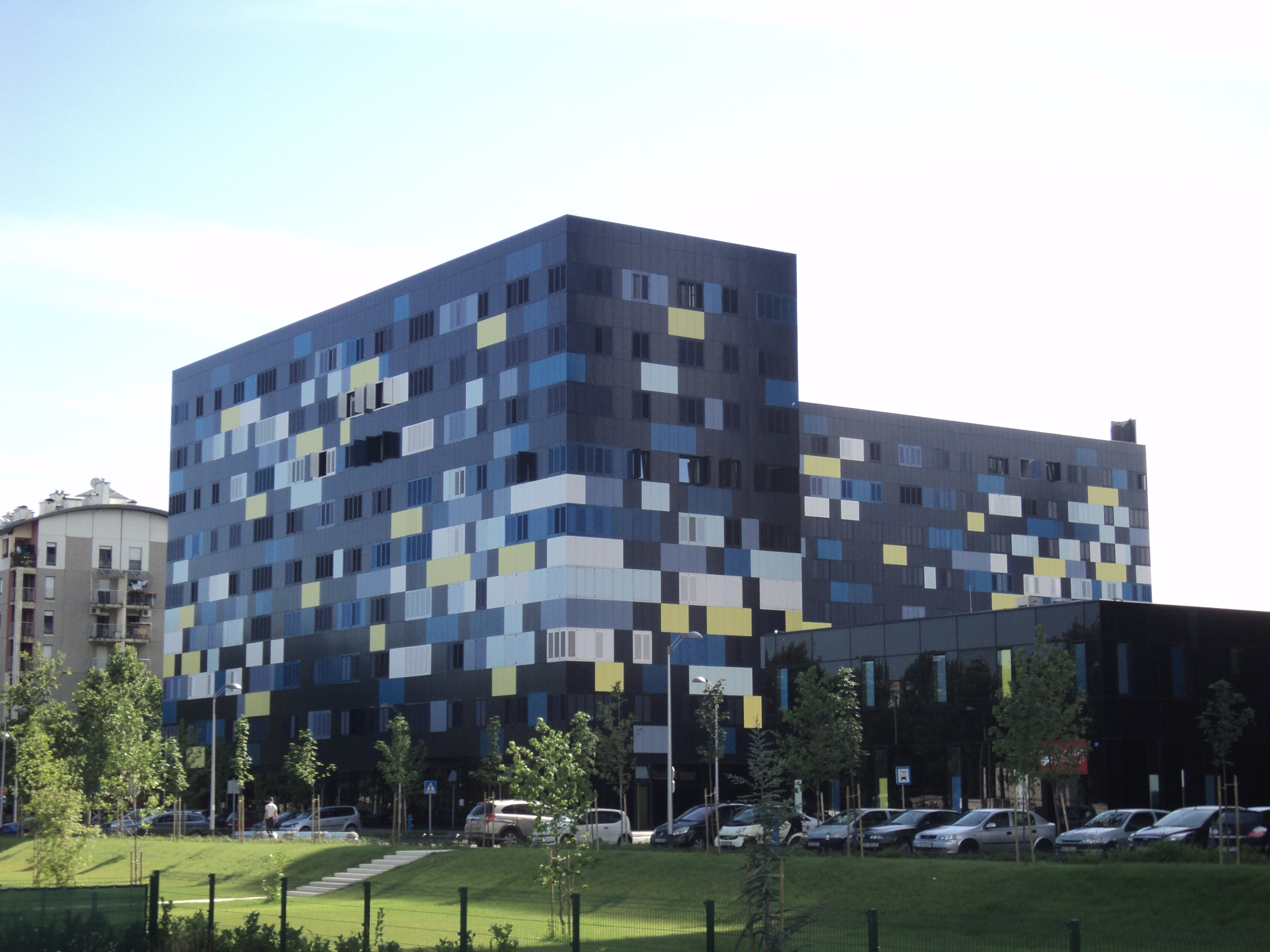
View of a residential building in the Business Centre Strojarska.

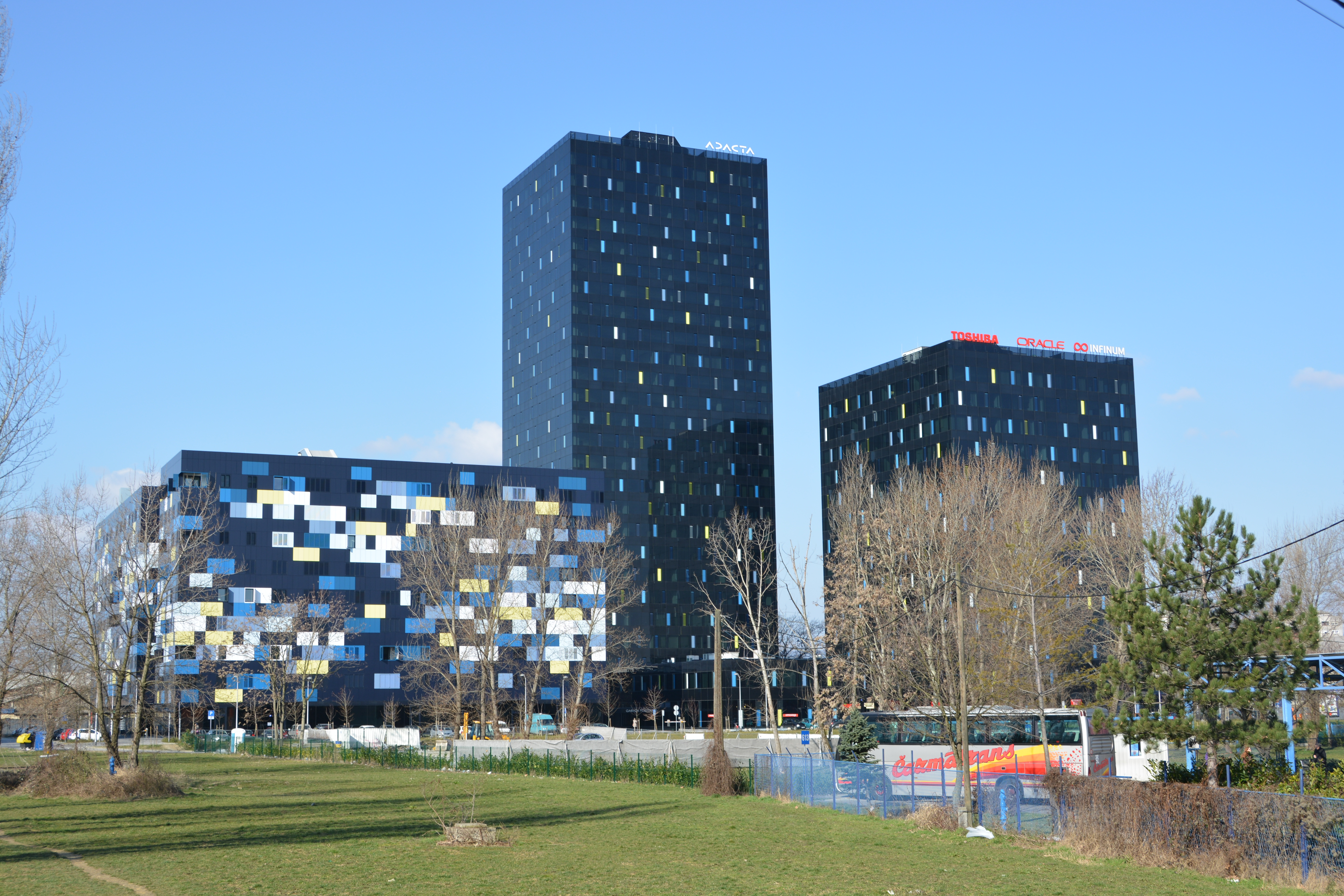
Finished complex, 2015
