= Vrbik =

Neighbourhood of Zagreb, Croatia

Coordinates: 45°47′50″N 15°58′10″E

- Areas of local councils of Cvjetnica and Vrbik (green) and Miramare (purple) on an interactive map of Zagreb

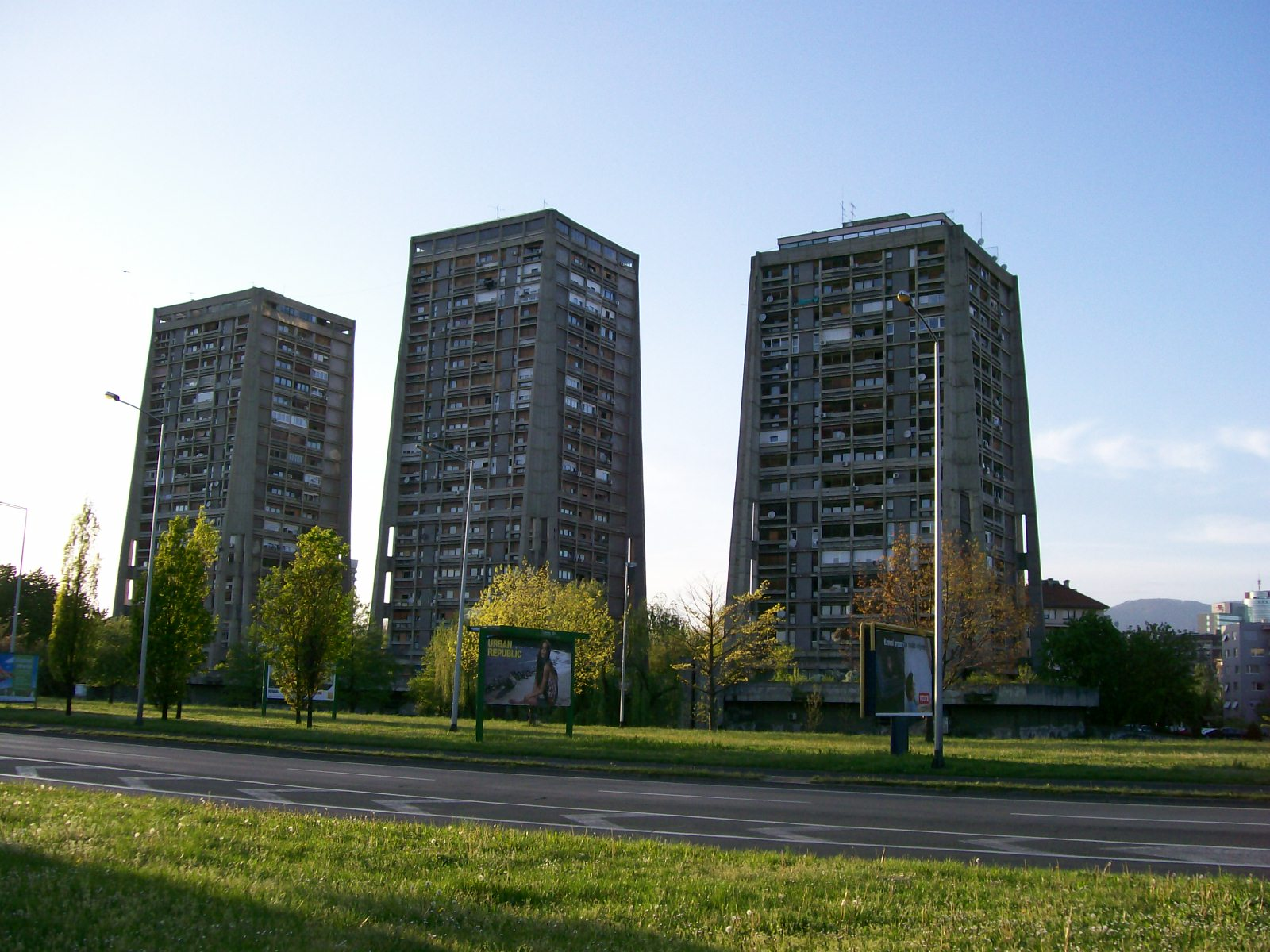
Richter's Skyscrapers are a set of three high-rise buildings located at Zeleni trg, in the southwest of the block.

Vrbik is a neighbourhood in the southwest of Zagreb, Croatia, within the Trnje district. The area is administered by the local city councils of Vrbik, with a population of 3,075, and Cvjetnica, with a population of 1,933 (census 2021).

The Vrbik and Cvjetnica councils in the west and the Miramare council in the east form a single large block between major city roads, but the former two are largely residential, while the latter has a large concentration of public institutions instead. The intermediate area of the so-called university alley (Croatian: sveučilišna aleja) is generally perceived as part of Vrbik, while the less developed residential areas of Miramare are distinct and have a much lower population density. The southernmost part of the block maintains an old street grid, but in Vrbik it's overbuilt, while in Miramare it's underbuilt. The population of Miramare was 1,175 in 2021.
