= 1 Ilica Street =

- Neboder u Ilici
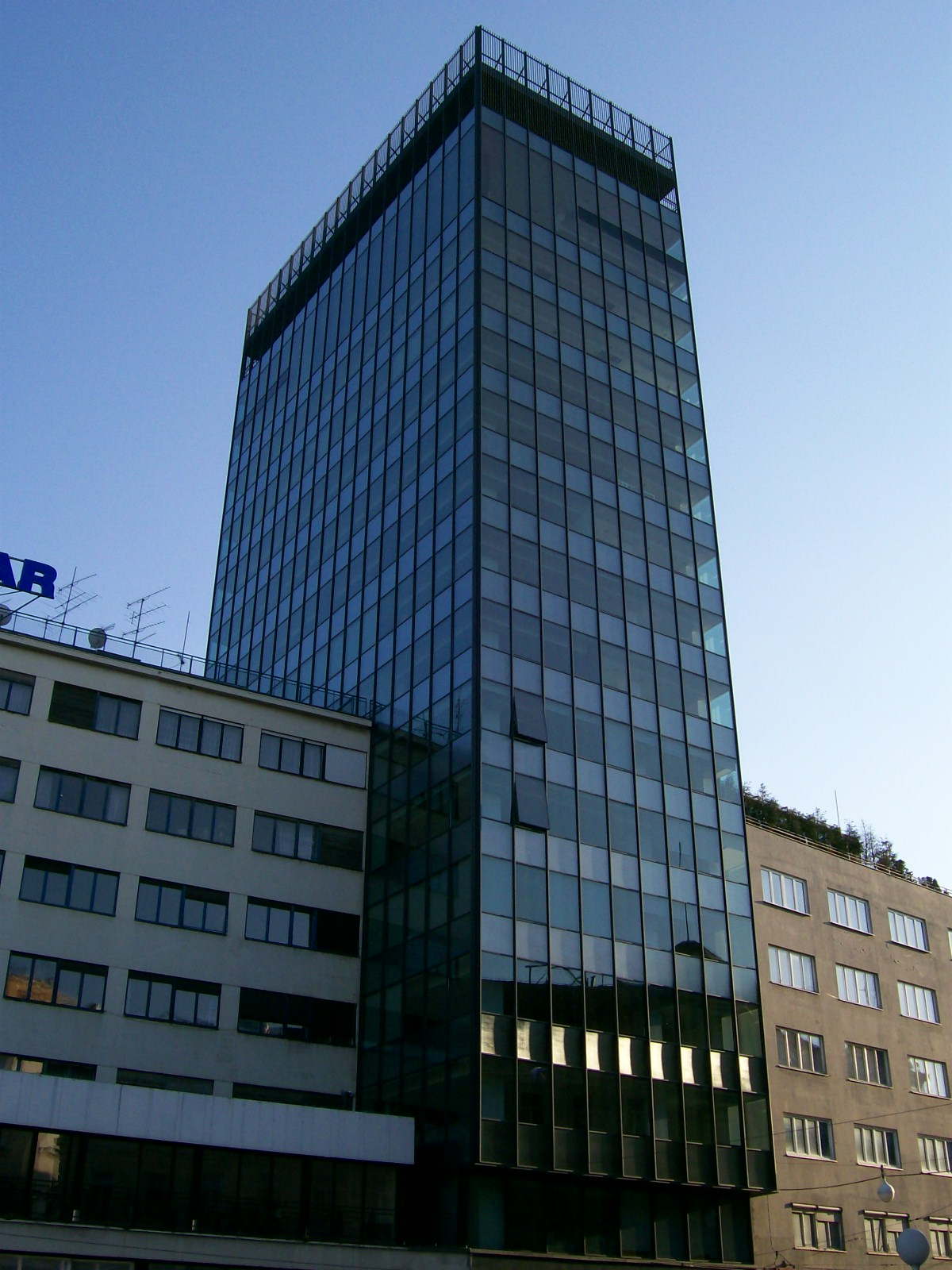

General information
- Status: Completed
- Type: Office building
- Architectural style: International
- Location: 1 Ilica Street, Zagreb, Croatia
- Coordinates: 45°48′46″N 15°58′34″E
- Construction started: 1957
- Completed: 1958
- Opening: 22 August 1959
- Renovated: 2006
- Owner: Frankopan Nekretnine

Height
- Roof: 70 m (230 ft)

Technical details
- Floor count: 16
- Floor area: 5,600 m^{2} (60,000 sq ft)

Design and construction
- Architects: Slobodan Jovičić; Josip Hitil; Ivo Žuljević

1 Ilica Street (Croatian: Neboder u Ilici, Ilički neboder, meaning "Skyscraper in Ilica") is a building located in Ilica Street overlooking Ban Jelačić Square in the Lower Town area of Zagreb, Croatia. In Croatian, the building is colloquially known under the generic title Neboder (lit. "Skyscraper") as it was the first business skyscraper in the country.

== History ==
The building, designed by the trio of Slobodan Jovičić, Josip Hitil and Ivo Žuljević, was built between 1957 and 1958 and was officially inaugurated on 22 August 1959, when Većeslav Holjevac was mayor of Zagreb. It was the second tallest building in Yugoslavia at the time of its completion, and it was the first building in the country which featured an aluminium façade (aluminium sheets for the building were manufactured at the Utva aircraft factory in Pančevo). Other notable high-rises built earlier in Zagreb include the nine-story modernist Löwy Building built in 1933 and the so-called Wooden Skyscraper designed by Drago Ibler - but since they were both residential buildings which resembled skyscrapers in design but not in function or size, the sixteen-story 1 Ilica Street is regarded as the first "bona fide skyscraper" built in Zagreb and Yugoslavia.

The principal investors were Končar and Ferimport, two large state-owned companies. The building later housed Ferimport offices, but it also featured an observation deck and a restaurant on its top floor (later converted into a short-lived disco club in the early 1990s) and a small shopping arcade which was built around the base of the building, connecting Ilica, Gajeva, Bogovićeva and Petrićeva streets. The observation deck was open to the public for decades, but it was fenced by security railings in 1967 after a man committed suicide by jumping off it and landing on a woman passing by, who was also killed.

On 28 November 1970, the day before former Yugoslav Republic Day, Julienne Bušić used the observation deck to throw leaflets advocating Croatian independence, for which she was arrested, sentenced to one month in prison, deported, and banned from entering the country for three years.

Ferimport later experienced a dramatic downturn in the 1990s after it was privatized in the years following Croatia's independence and the fall of communism, and the building visibly deteriorated in this period.

In 2001, three years after Ferimport had entered administration, it was sold for €6 million to Peter Doimi de Frankopan, a British real estate investor who claimed lineage to the House of Frankopan, a Croatian aristocratic family thought to be extinct in the 17th century. Frankopan had plans for a large scale reconstruction of the building, but the initial concept (which entailed a complete redesign of the façade and the addition of panoramic elevators, spiral staircases and a few extra floors), was rejected by the city's institute for the protection of cultural heritage. The project was then delayed for four years until a revised renovation plan was finally approved by city authorities in December 2005.

Following the approval, renovation was finally launched in 2006 and was finished in early 2008. The project was designed by the Aukett Fitzroy Robinson interior design practice in collaboration with the Zagreb-based architecture studio Proarh, and the actual work was done by the Strabag construction company. The most significant change in the exterior was the replacement of the originally clear windows with dark gray glass. The building currently has 5,600 m^{2} of office space, and the observation deck on the top floor was closed to the public in 2007. It was reopened in 2013 as "Zagreb Eye".
