= AC Hotels =

European-based hotel chain

AC Hotels by Marriott
- Type: Subsidiary
- Industry: Hospitality
- Founded: 1997
- Founder: Antonio Catalán
- Headquarters: Bethesda, Maryland
- Number of locations: 188 (September, 2020)
- Area served: Worldwide
- Parent: Marriott International
- Website: ac-hotels.marriott.com

AC Hotels by Marriott, formerly named AC Hoteles C. A., is a midscale hotel chain owned by Marriott International serving business and leisure travelers. As of June 30, 2020, it had 170 hotels with 25,811 rooms in addition to 135 hotels with 23,172 rooms in the pipeline.

== History ==
In 1997, Antonio Catalán founded AC Hoteles C. A. after selling his 35% share in NH Hotel Group.

In 2005, business austerity measures resulted in conference cancellations and widespread bans on business trips for several years. The downturn forced AC to team with a major Spanish rival in 2009 in a management deal that cut costs at both chains. The chain rebranded after a needed, but undisclosed, investment by Marriott. A new joint company assumed the management, but property ownerships remained with existing parties.

Since June 8, 2011, AC Hotels by Marriott has operated as a subsidiary of Marriott International, and is now based at Marriott's headquarters in Bethesda, Maryland. Catalán remained as AC Hotels' president.

== Locations ==
As of 2024, AC Hotels by Marriott maintains properties in Australia, Austria, Brazil, Canada, Chile, China, Croatia, Denmark, Dominican Republic, France, Germany, Italy, Malaysia, Malta, Peru, Portugal, Latvia, Poland, Slovakia, Spain, Turkey, Jamaica, the United Kingdom, and the United States.and Morocco

== Accommodations ==
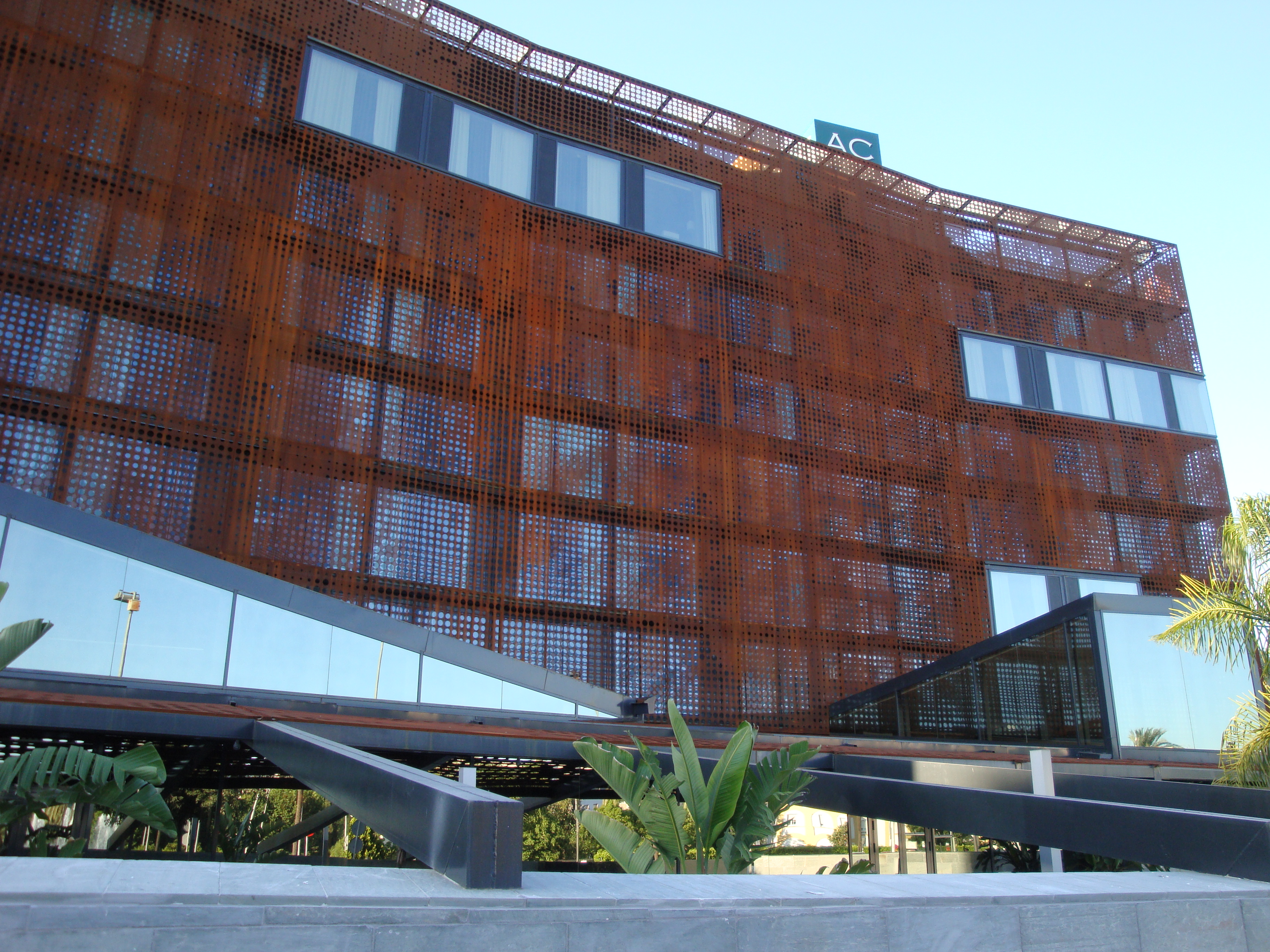
AC Hotel by Marriott in Córdoba

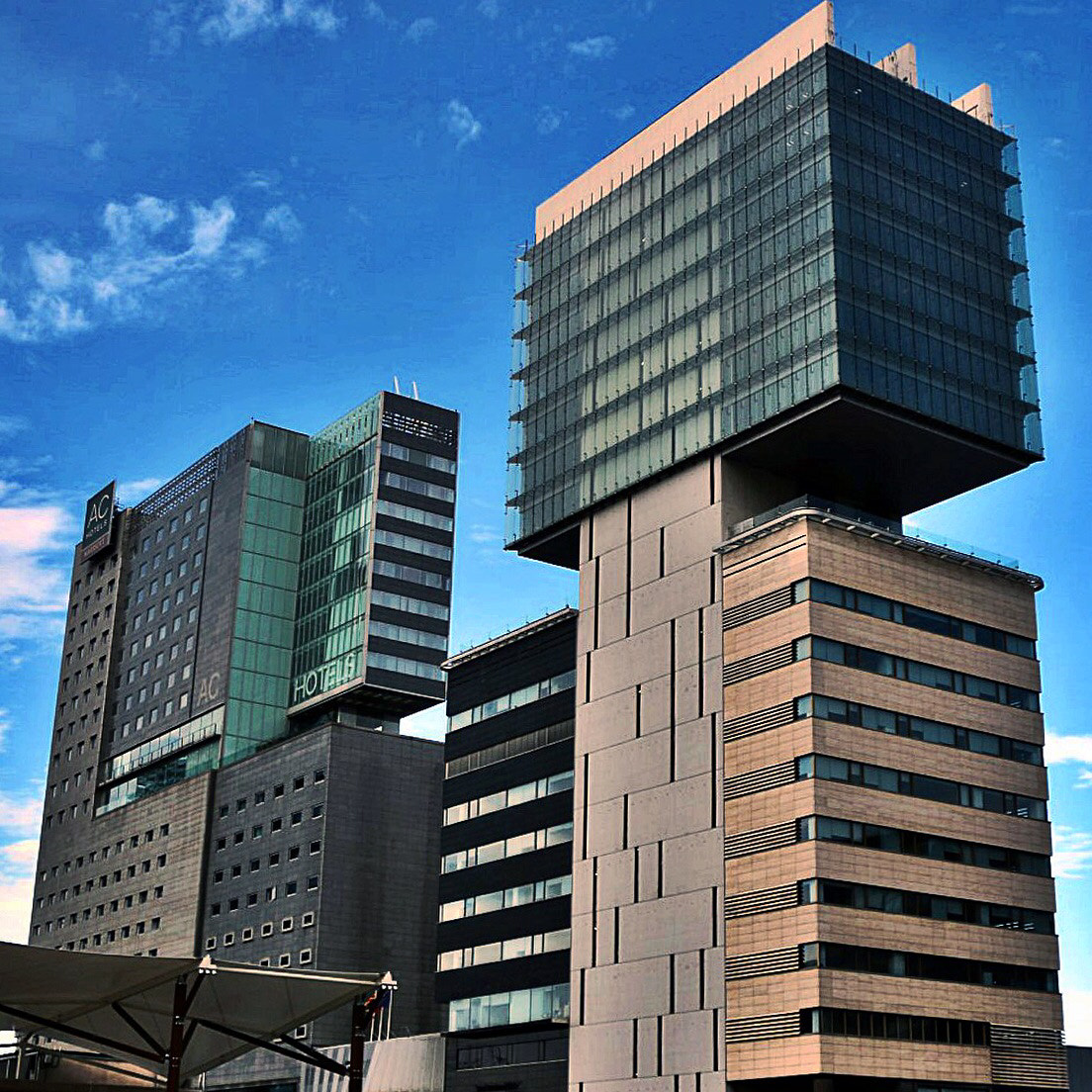
AC Hotel by Marriott in Barcelona

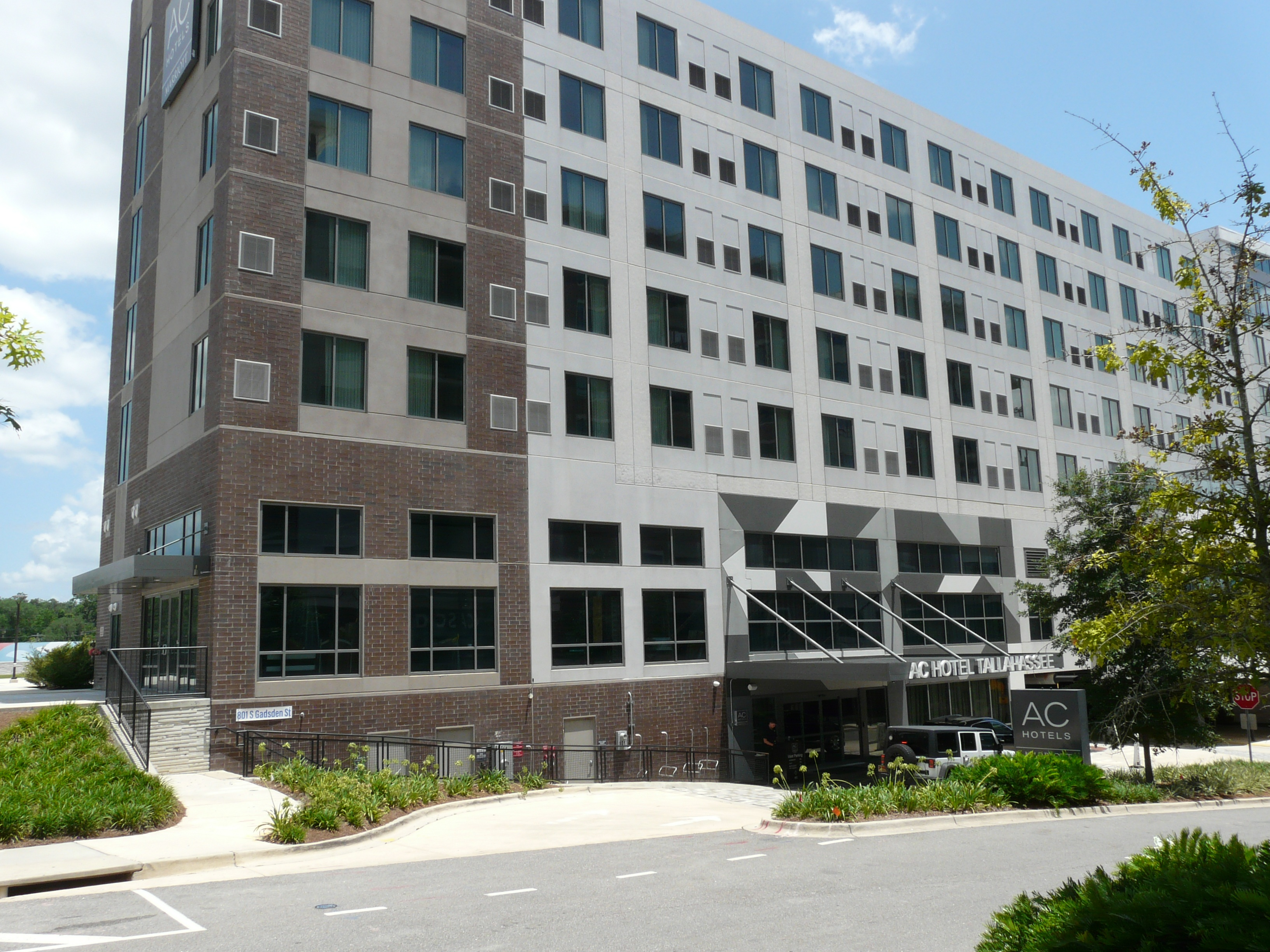
AC Hotel by Marriott in Tallahassee, Florida

=== Historical ===
		US	Non-US	Total
2011	Properties		80	80
2011	Rooms		8,371	8,371
2012	Properties		79	79
2012	Rooms		8,736	8,736
2013	Properties		75	75
2013	Rooms		8,491	8,491
2014	Properties	1	76	77
2014	Rooms	220	9,311	9,531

=== From 2015 ===
		North America	Europe	Middle E. & Africa	Asia & Pacific	Caribbean Latin Am.	Total
2015	Properties	5	78				83
2015	Rooms	911	9,551				10,462
2016	Properties	11	80			4	95
2016	Rooms	1,913	9,879			966	12,758
2017	Properties	31	82			10	123
2017	Rooms	5,288	10,035			1,917	17,240
2018	Properties	49	85	1		10	145
2018	Rooms	8,447	10,589	188		1,553	20,777
2019	Properties	63	83	1		12	159
2019	Rooms	10,720	10,631	188		1,922	23,461
2020	Properties	73	84	1	4	14	176
2020	Rooms	12,337	10,854	188	1,296	2,254	26,929
2021	Properties	95	87	2	4	15	203
2021	Rooms	15,692	11,508	286	1,296	2,383	31,165
2022	Properties	107	89	2	7	17	222
2022	Rooms	17,766	11,959	286	1,910	2,696	34,617
2023	Properties	117	92	2	7	18	236
2023	Rooms	19,386	12,529	286	1,910	2,867	36,978
