= Eurotower (Zagreb) =

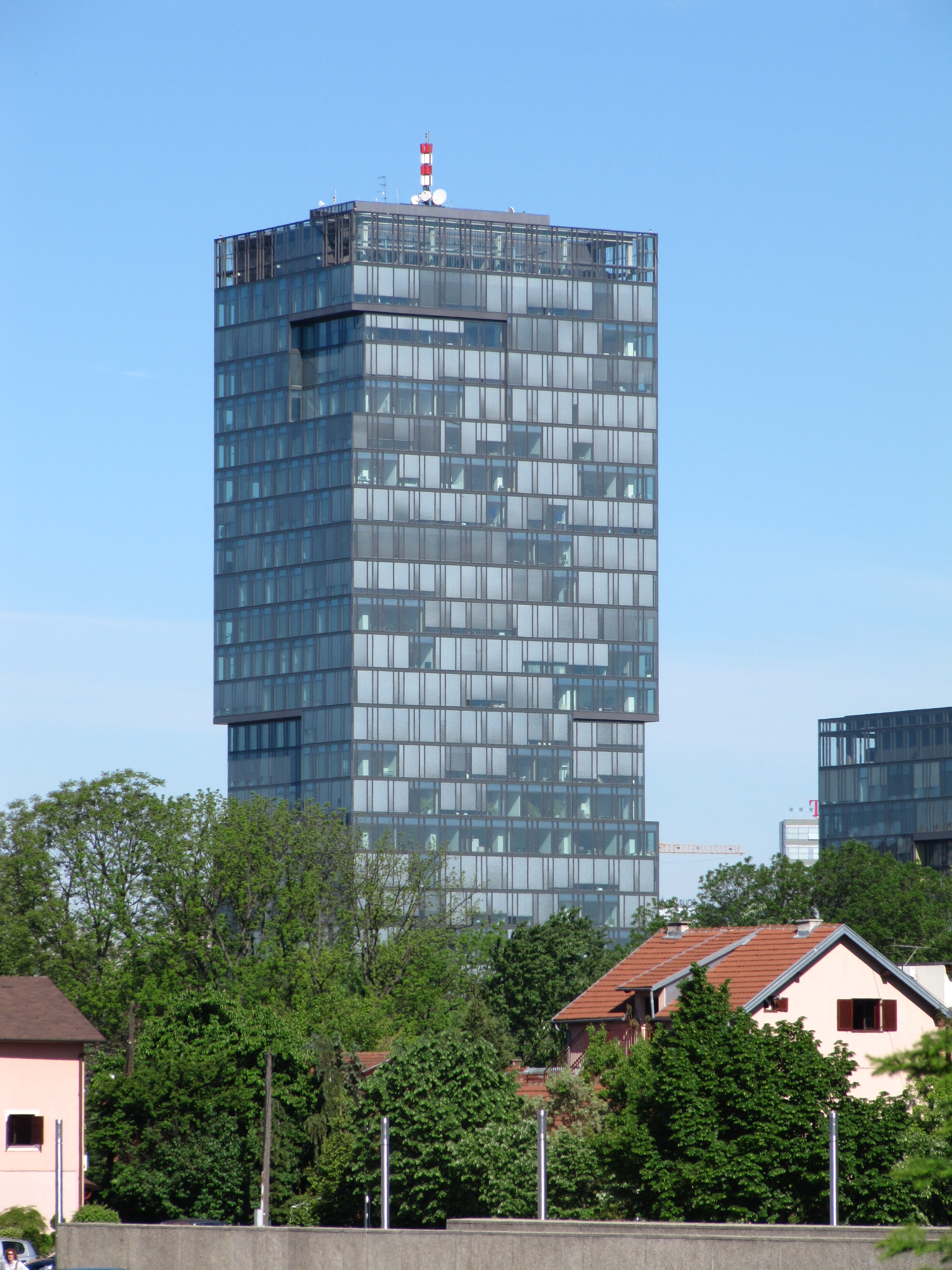
- View from National and University Library
- Interactive map of the Eurotower area

Record height
- Tallest in Croatia from 2006 to 2015^{[I]}
- Preceded by: Zagrepčanka
- Surpassed by: Strojarska Business Center

General information
- Status: Completed
- Type: Office tower
- Architectural style: Neomodern
- Location: Zagreb, Croatia
- Coordinates: 45°47′56″N 15°58′10″E
- Construction started: 2004
- Completed: 2006

Height
- Height: 96 m (315 ft)

Dimensions
- Diameter: 36 m x 27.6 m

Technical details
- Floor area: 18.920 m^{2}

Design and construction
- Architect: Marijan Hržić
- Architecture firm: Hidrocommerce
- Developer: Josip Kordić
- Main contractor: Porr - Hrvatska
- Awards and prizes: Business building of the year (2006)

Other information
- Parking: 374
- Public transit access: ZET - 3, 5, 13, 33

Eurotower is a high-rise building in Zagreb, Croatia, located in Trnje at the intersection of the Vukovarska and Lučićeva streets, in the southwest corner. It was built in 2006 and with its height of 96 m, it was the tallest building in Croatia until Strojarska Business Center was built in 2015. This office tower has 26 levels and it is 96 m (315 ft) tall. The Embassy of the Republic of Lithuania to the Republic of Croatia, Montenegro, the Republic of Kosovo, and the Republic of North Macedonia is located in the building.

Eurotower is currently best known as the headquarters of the Zagreb Stock Exchange and KPMG in Croatia. The architect is Marijan Hržić, who is also the designer of the Cibona Tower in Zagreb.

== History ==
The site was designated for the construction of the skyscraper in 2002, and building works commenced in the summer of 2004. The first window was installed in May 2005. The structure reached its highest occupied floor by the end of August 2005 and attained its full architectural height of 96 m by the end of September of the same year. The skyscraper was completed in 2006, when it received the "Commercial Building of the Year" award for Southeast Europe. The project was developed by Josip Kordić, director of Hidrocommerce. Porr – Croatia served as the main construction contractor, while Hidrocommerce was responsible for the primary structural works.

The top floor is only partially enclosed by a glass façade; most of the level features ribs of glass surfaces that reflect sunlight at specific angles. Under certain lighting conditions, different sections or sides of the skyscraper reflect light differently, causing the tower to appear two-toned in overcast weather or pearlescent in sunny conditions.

The business complex is situated in a strategically located location, equally accessible from the city center and from all major urban traffic arteries. All destinations within the central city area can be reached in a very short time by private vehicle or public transportation (Zagreb tram). Within this urban zone are numerous municipal and state institutions, including the Vatroslav Lisinski Concert Hall, the City Administration, several university faculties (including Faculty of Electrical Engineering and Computing, University of Zagreb), and numerous ministries of the Government of the Republic of Croatia, as well as major business and financial centers such as FINA and the headquarters of Zagrebačka banka, Erste Bank, Raiffeisen Bank, BKS Bank, and Hypo Alpe Adria Bank, as well as current tenants; Zagreb Stock Exchange, Al Jazeera Balkans, Huawei, Trikoder and many more.

== Views of Eurotower ==
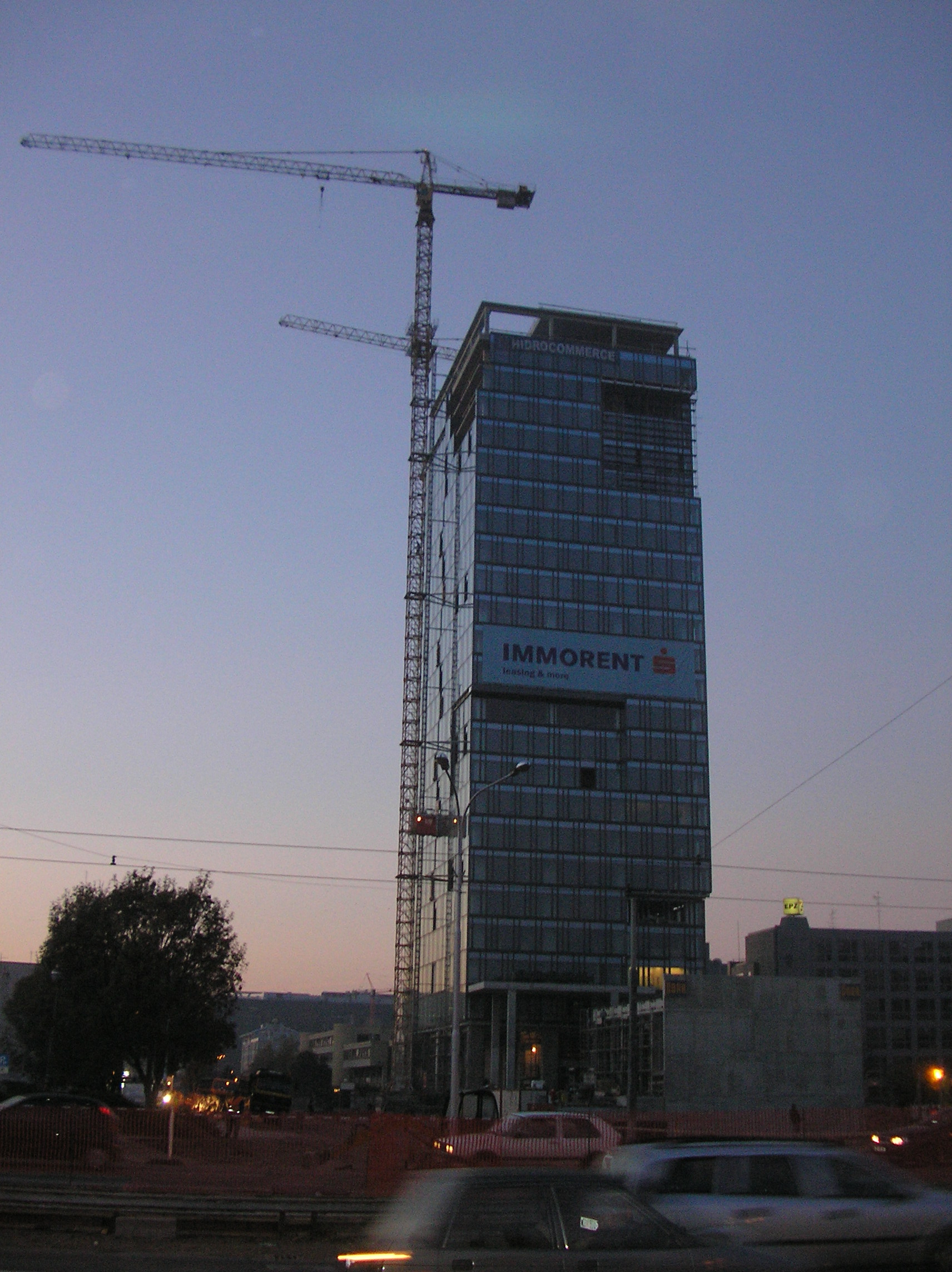
Construction of the tower, 2005

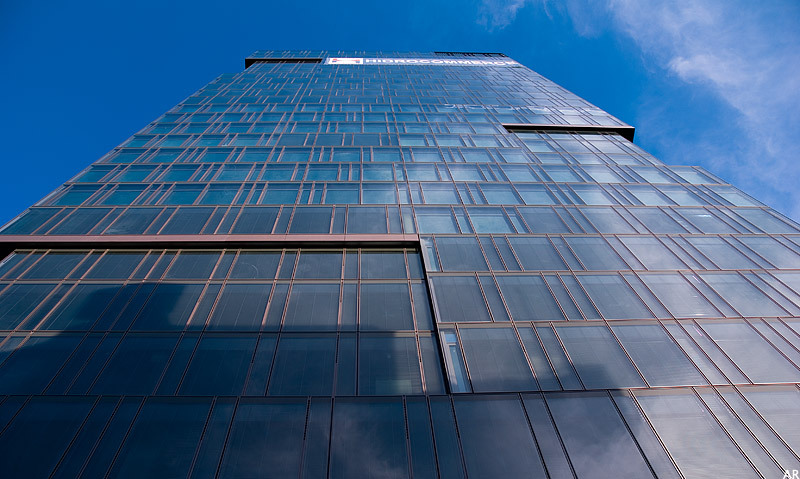
Eurotower facade

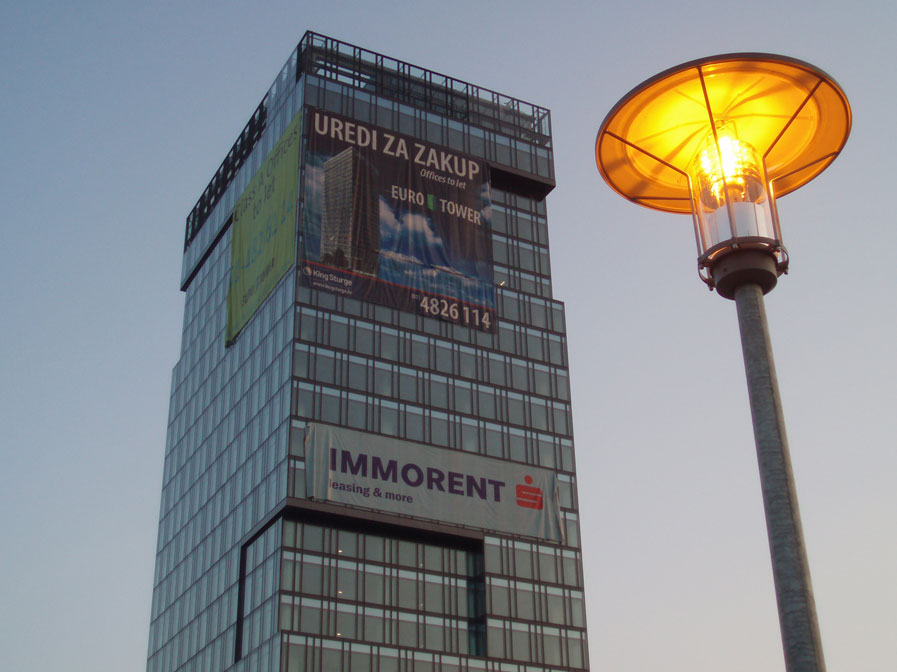
Eurotower top

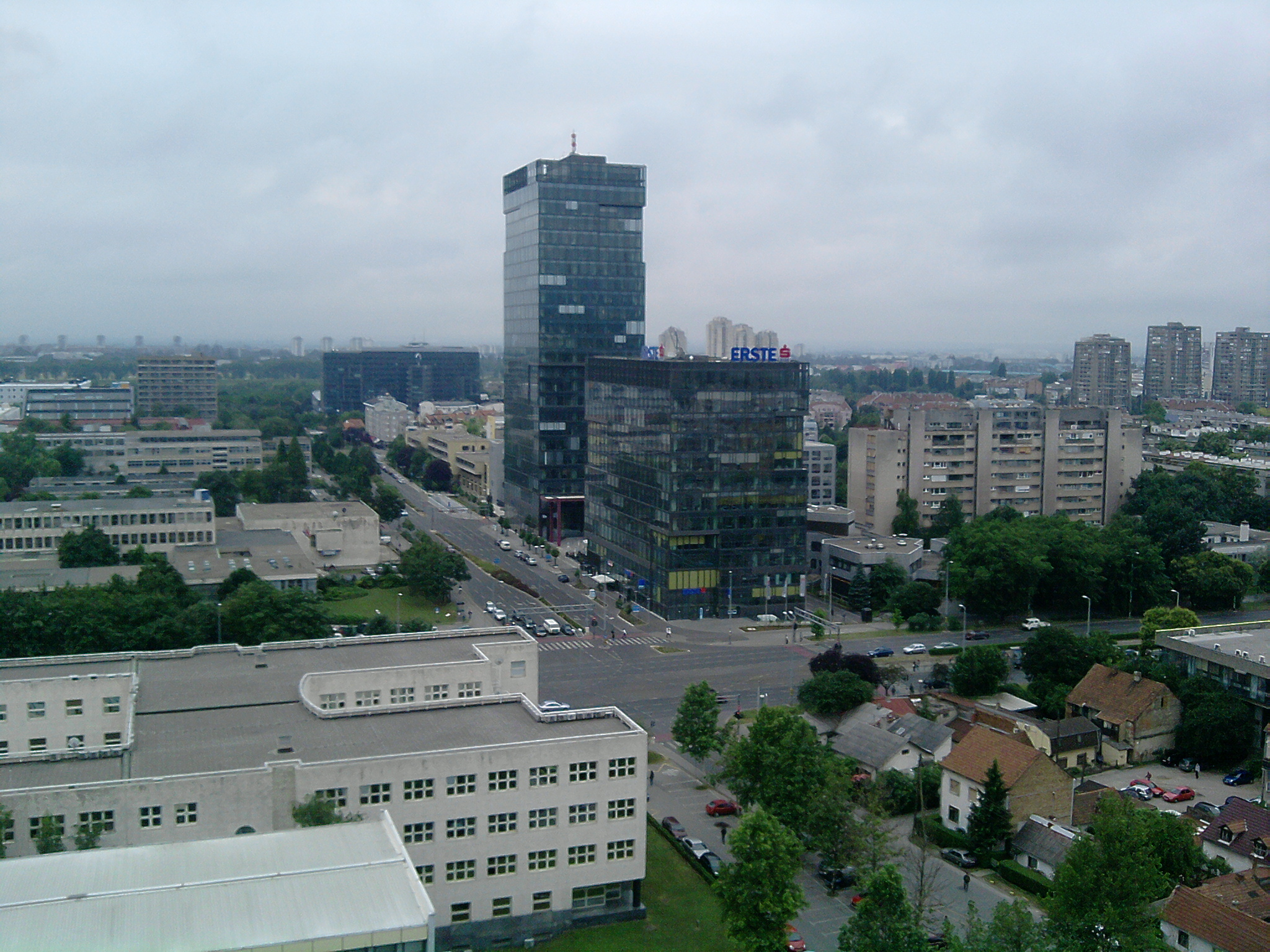
Intersection of Street of Vukovar city and Street of Ivana Lučića with Eurotower in the background

== See also ==
- List of tallest buildings in Croatia
