= Hoto =

Hoto may refer to:

- Head of the Ohio, a rowing race in Pittsburgh, Pennsylvania
- Hōtō, a noodle soup and regional dish originating from Yamanashi, Japan
- Hōtō (pagoda), a form of Japanese pagoda
- HOTO Tower, a business building in Zagreb, Croatia
- Cocoa Hoto, the main character of the manga series Is the Order a Rabbit?
