= Zagrepčanka =

Office building in Zagreb, Croatia

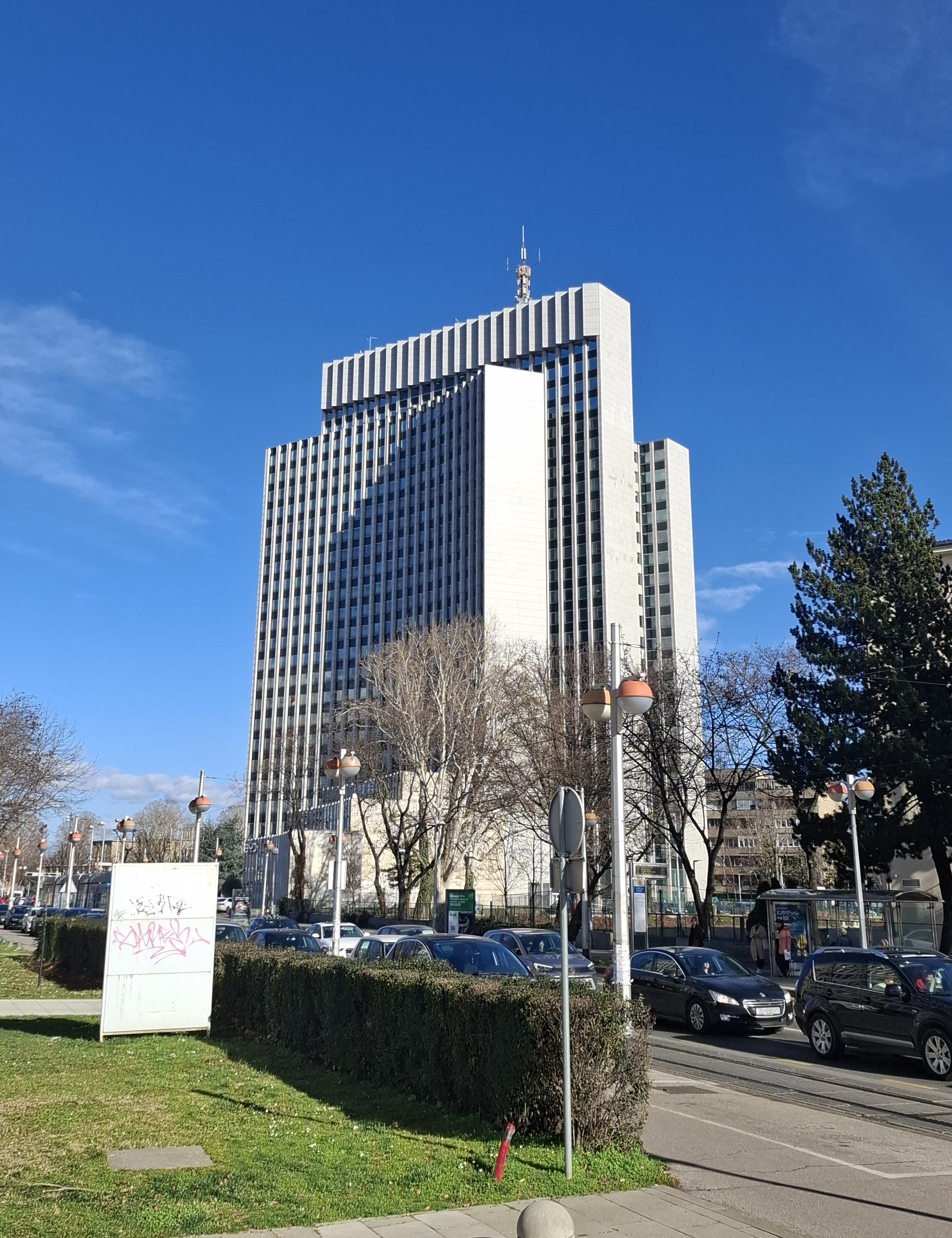
- Zagrepčanka, 2025
- Interactive map of the Zagrepčanka area

Record height
- Tallest in Croatia from 1976 to 2006^{[I]}
- Preceded by: Eurotower

General information
- Status: Completed
- Type: Office space
- Architectural style: Modernism
- Location: Zagreb, Croatia
- Coordinates: 45°47′54″N 15°57′44″E
- Construction started: 1971
- Completed: 1976
- Opening: 23 December 1976

Height
- Antenna spire: 110 m (361 ft)
- Roof: 94.6 m (310 ft)

Technical details
- Floor count: 27

Design and construction
- Architects: Slavko Jelinek, Berislav Vinković

Zagrepčanka is a high-rise office building located in Zagreb, Croatia. The address is Savska 41, on the Savska Road and Vukovar Avenue intersection.

== Technical information ==
Zagrepčanka is ranked 4th by height (1st when you include the antenna) in Croatia. It is 94.6 meters (310 feet) tall, and it has 27 levels. There is a radio mast on the roof, which increases the height of the tower to 109 meters (363 feet). There are two underground levels, used for parking spaces. It's served by six elevators. The building is a part of the complex, which includes a lowrise 3 level business objects, an art installation, and a fountain.

The tower has three parts. The center part has 26 floors, the west wing has 21 floor, and the east wing has 19 floors. The facade is derived in white marble, and a reflective green glass. There are 23 three-apses protrusions, which run from the 25th to 26th floor. The center wing has 24 support beams, and the side wings have 23 beams. The side wings are hyperbolically curved over the vertical axis.

== History ==
The tower was built in 1976 by architects Slavko Jelinek and Berislav Vinković, who drew their inspiration from the Thyssen-Haus building in Düsseldorf.

Less than ten years after the completion, heavy marble tiles started to fall off from the facade. This was largely due to the low weather resistance of Carrara marble that had been used for the construction. The problem was most pronounced in the southern, Sun-exposed face. Because of the danger, the employees had to enter the tower through an improvised tunnel, made out of the wooden planks and steel bars. By 2014, the eastern and the western face of the building have been repaired by replacing 5000 square meters of tiles.

Zagrepčanka was surpassed in (structural) height by the Eurotower (97.8 m) in 2006. But it still holds the No.1 place in the real height (109 m), and it has the Croatia's highest office.

Zagrepčanka 512, an annual foot race up the staircase, has been held since 2012.

== See also ==
- List of tallest buildings in Croatia

== Views of Zagrepčanka ==
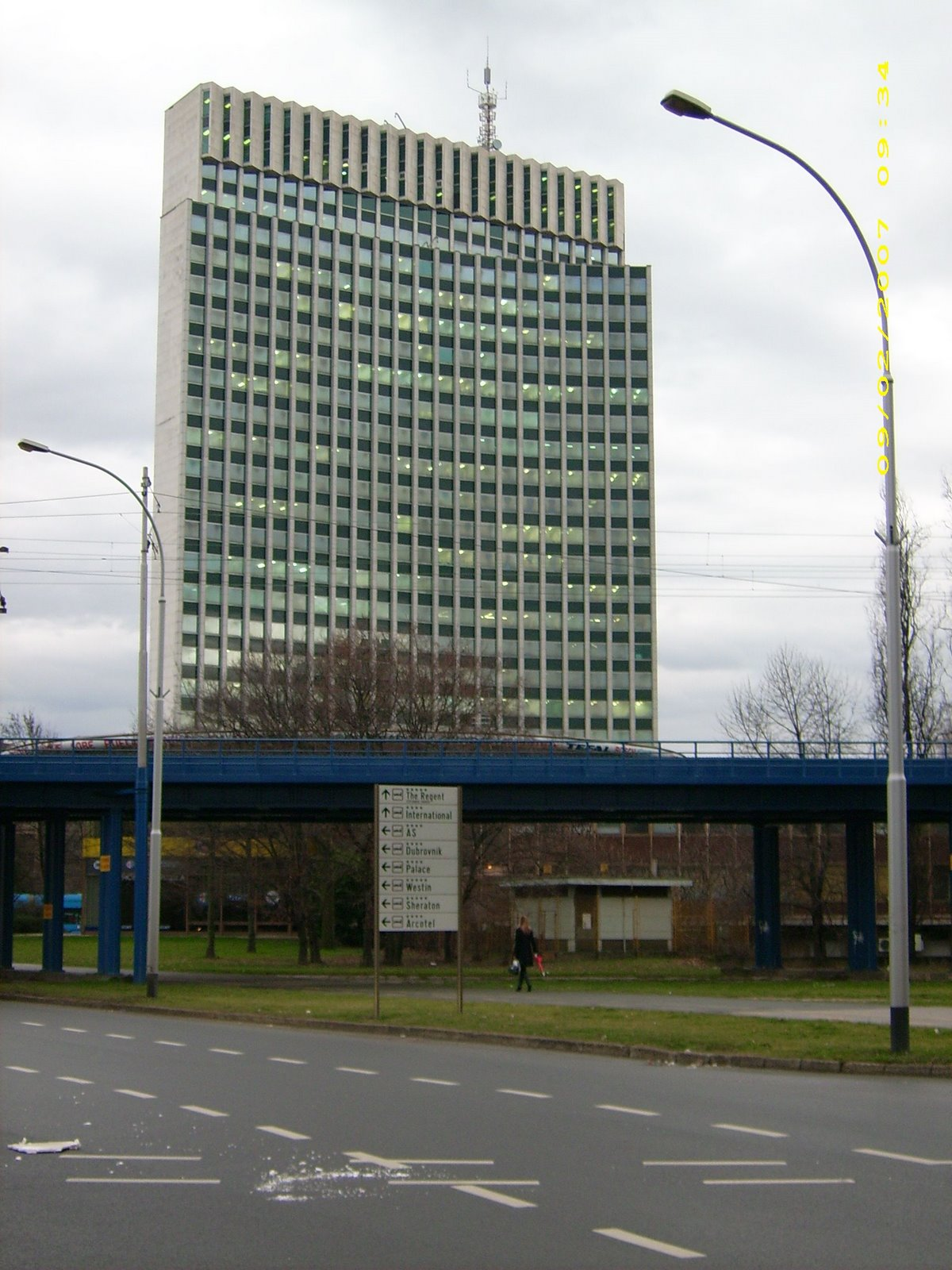
View from the west looking over railroad

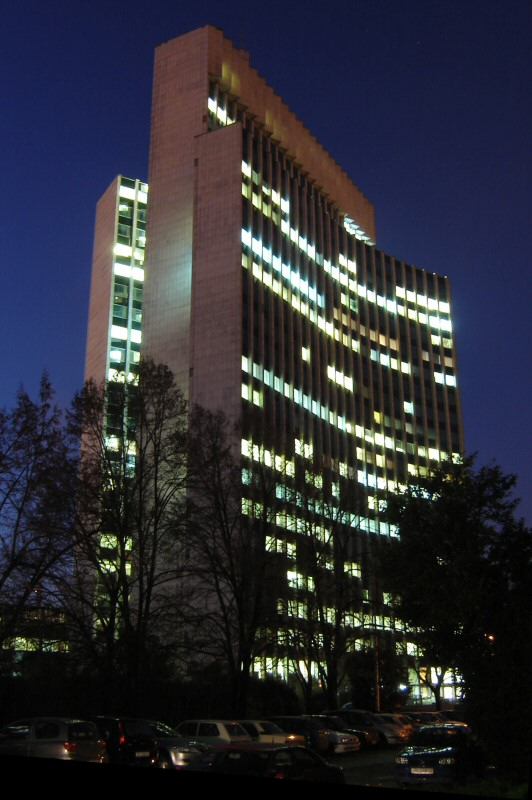
Zagrepčanka tower at night

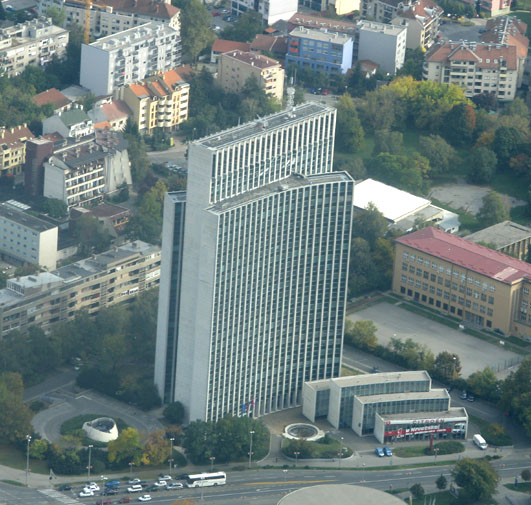
Aerial view

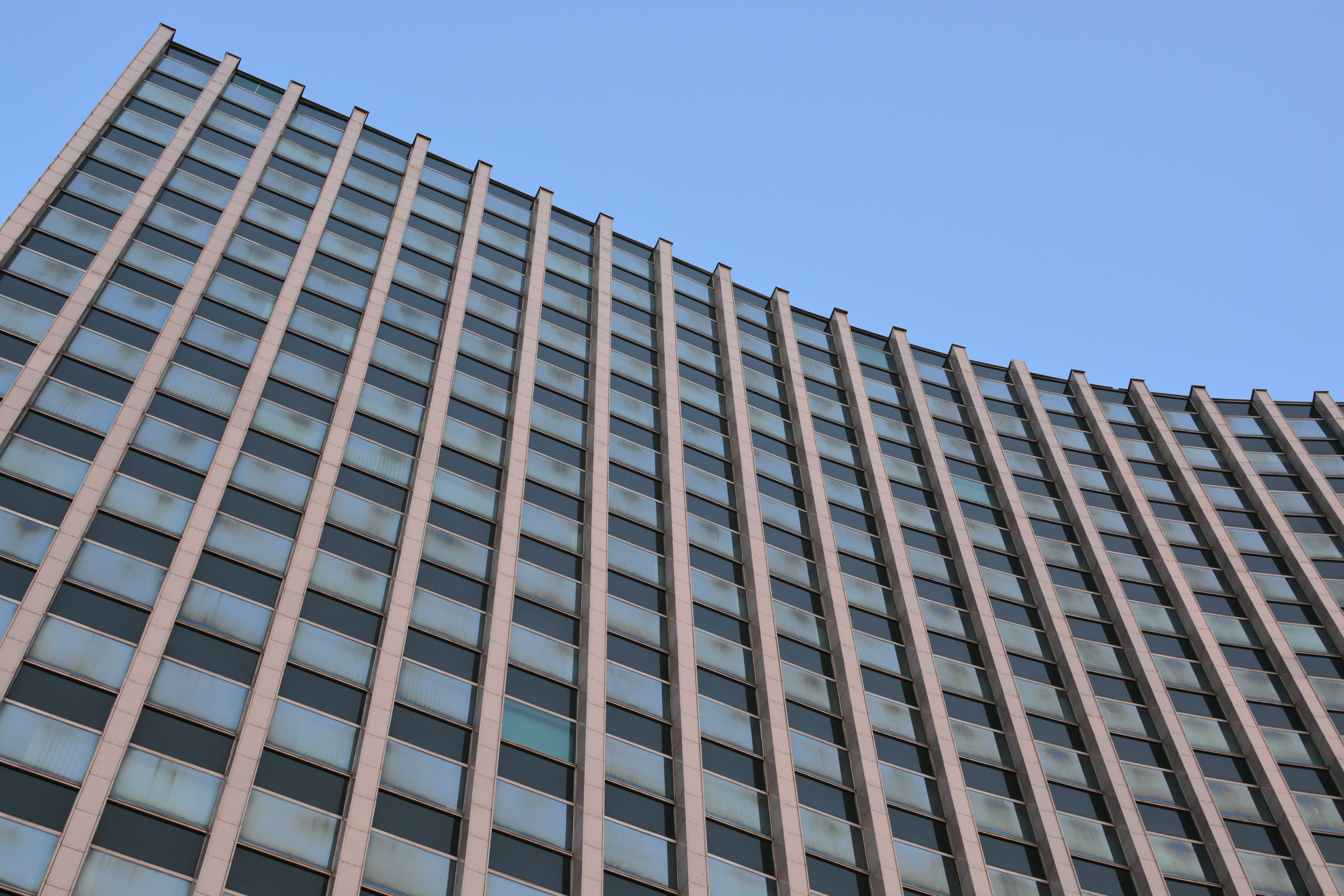
Facade window details

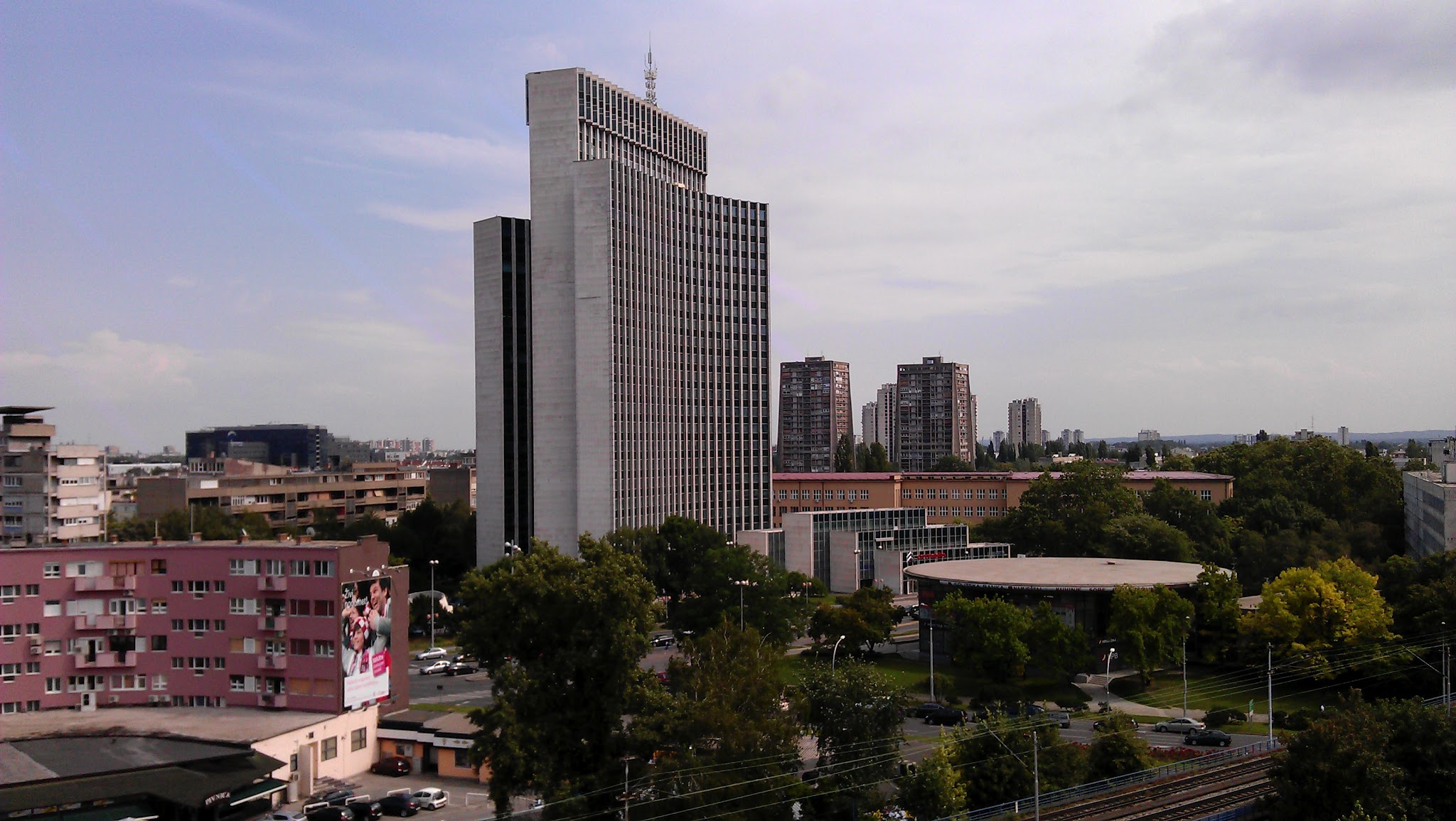
Panorama

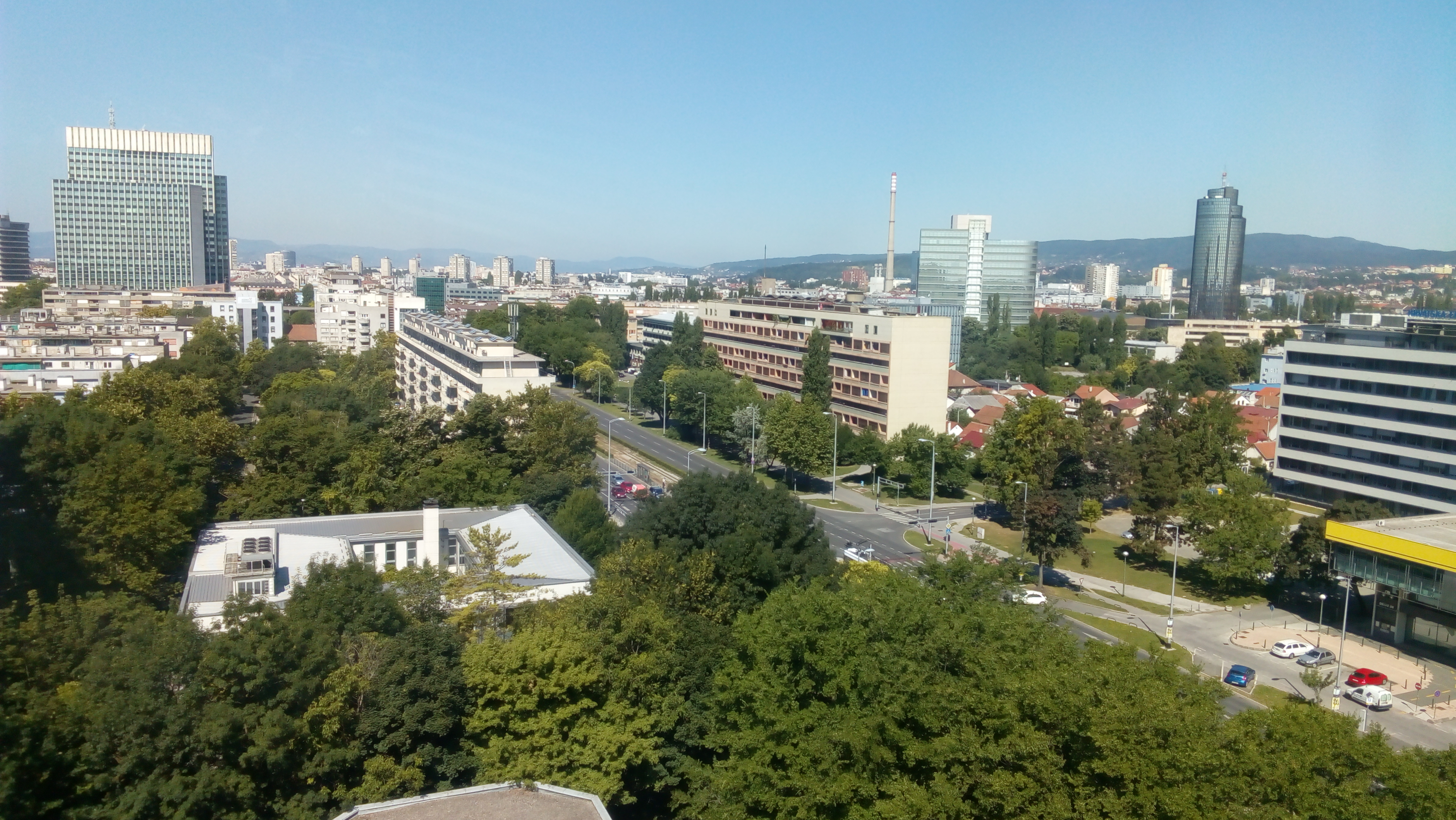
Zagrepčanka together with HOTO Tower and Cibona Tower
