= HOTO Tower =

Business building in Zagreb, Croatia

Coordinates: 45°48′07″N 15°57′50″E

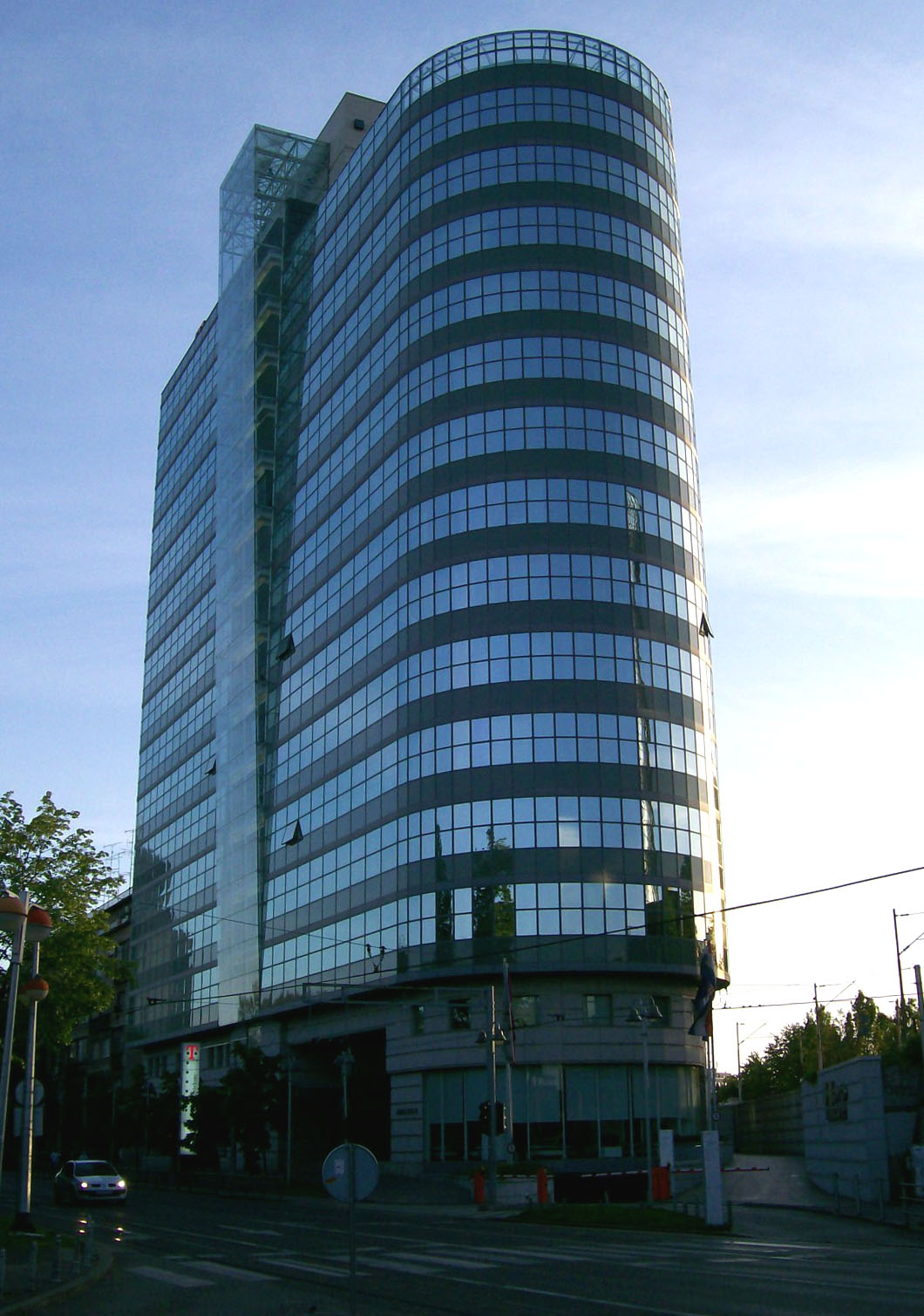
- The HOTO Tower

General information
- Status: Completed
- Type: Skyscraper
- Location: West of Savska Street, between the Cibona and Zagrepčanka
- Country: Croatia
- Completed: 2004

Design and construction
- Architect(s): Marijan Turklin

HOTO Business Tower is a modern business building in Zagreb, Croatia. It was built in 2004 as the first skyscraper after the Croatian War of Independence. It is located to the west of the Savska street, between the Cibona Tower and Zagrepčanka. It is about 64.5 m high and has 17 floors above ground and four levels underground. With a NLA of approximately 15.400 m^{2}, and 250 parking lots in the underground garage, it is one of the biggest business towers in Zagreb.

The tower was housing the offices of T-Hrvatski Telekom, the Croatian branch of T-com, for about 10 years. The building was acquired by the SIGNA Property Funds in 2007. Today it is the modern office building, available for lease of modern and representative A - class office spaces in the near proximity to the very center of Zagreb.

== See also ==
- List of tallest buildings in Croatia
