= Cibona Tower =

High-rise building in Zagreb, Croatia

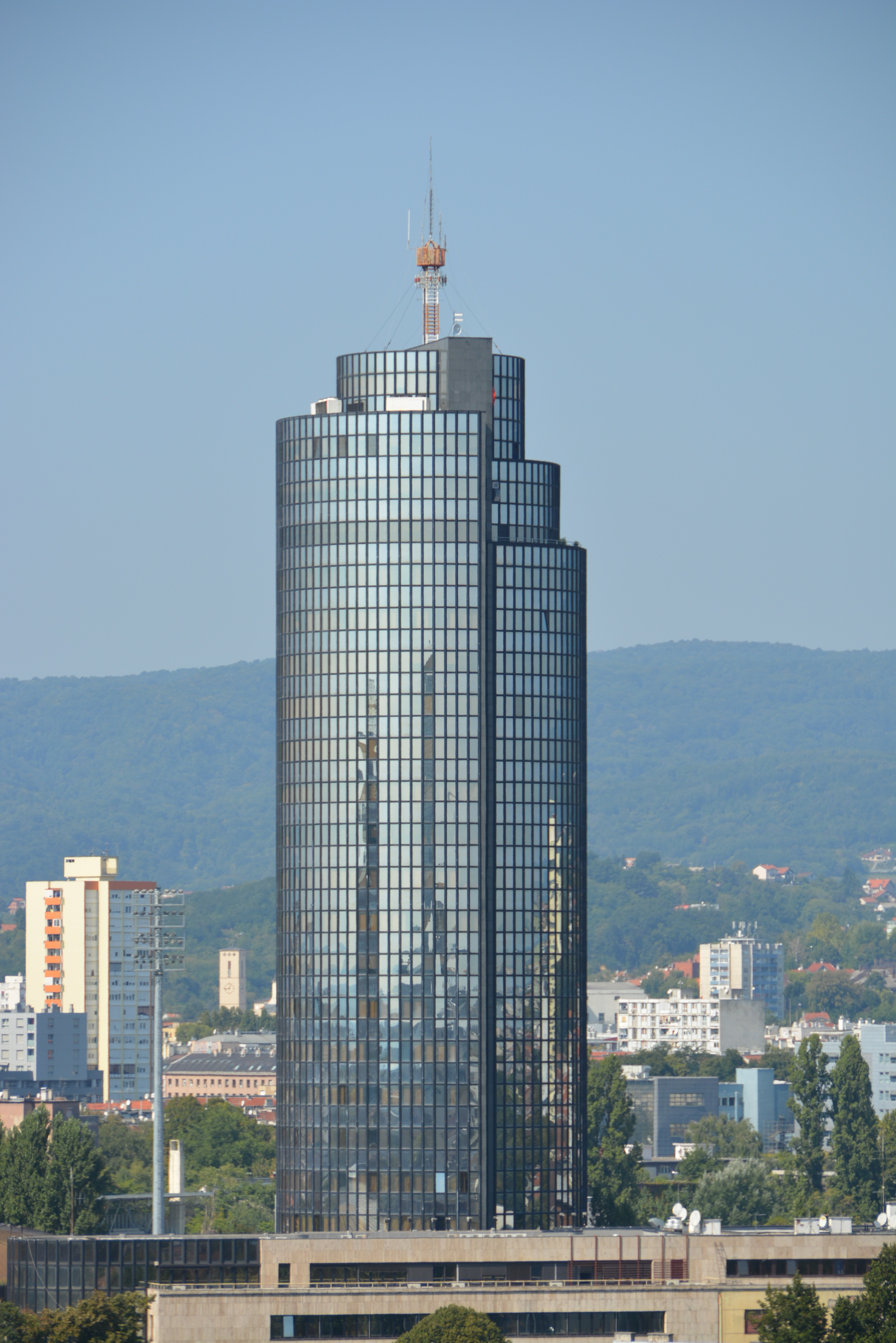
- Cibona Tower

General information
- Status: Completed
- Type: Office building
- Location: Zagreb, Croatia
- Coordinates: 45°48′11″N 15°57′50″E
- Construction started: 1986
- Opening: 1987
- Renovated: 2023 – 2025

Height
- Antenna spire: 105 m (344 ft)
- Roof: 92 m (302 ft)

Technical details
- Floor count: 25

Design and construction
- Architect: Marijan Hržić
- Developer: Ivan Piteša
- Structural engineer: Borislav Šerbetić
- Main contractor: GRO Vladimir Gortan

The Cibona Tower is a high-rise building located in the center of Zagreb, Croatia, on Dražen Petrović Square 3, near the Savska and Kranjčevićeva street intersection. It was built in 1987. With the hight of 92 meters (105 with antenna), Cibona makes one of the tallest buildings in Zagreb and Croatia.

== Technical information ==
It is 92 m (302 ft) tall, and it has 25 levels above ground. There is a radio mast on the roof, which increases the height of the tower to 105 m (344 ft). As of 2024, Cibona Tower is ranked 6th by height in Croatia.

The tower is a part of the complex that comprises lower business objects, a 5,400-seat basketball hall, and an art installation.

The skyscraper is a cylinder, 25 m (82 ft) in diameter, which reduces its diameter in four stages, and ends up with a radio mast. The facade is derived in dark steel, totally reflective glass, and black granite. The windows are not fixed. The first stage ends up on the 21st floor, second on the 23rd floor, third on the 24th floor, and the fourth on the 25th floor. The rim of the tower is held by the 26 reinforced concrete pylons, which make it resistant to a 7° Richter scale earthquake, and the impact of a smaller airplane.

== History ==
The tower was built in 1987 because of the Universiade that was held in Zagreb that year. The architect responsible for its design is Marijan Hržić.

The last known occupant of the tower was Agrokor, the biggest food company in Central and Eastern Europe.

As of 2018, the media reported that the tower and its surroundings were in a state of disrepair.

Cibona Tower was bought by the company Agram in 2022. Since 2023 the business tower is being renovated. The renovation works are estimated to be worth around €10 million and to be completed in 2025.

== Views of Cibona Tower ==
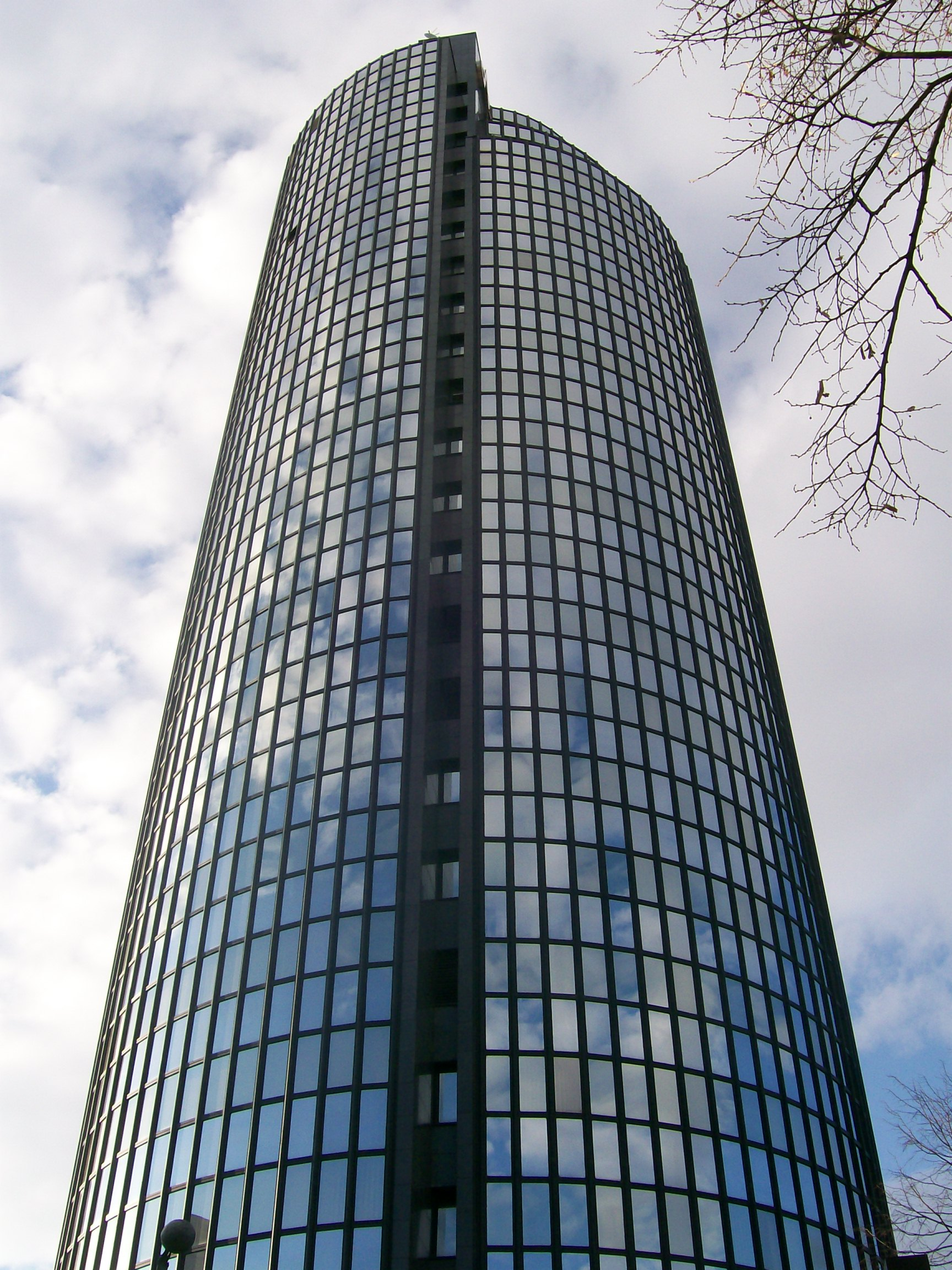
Cibona Tower from ground up

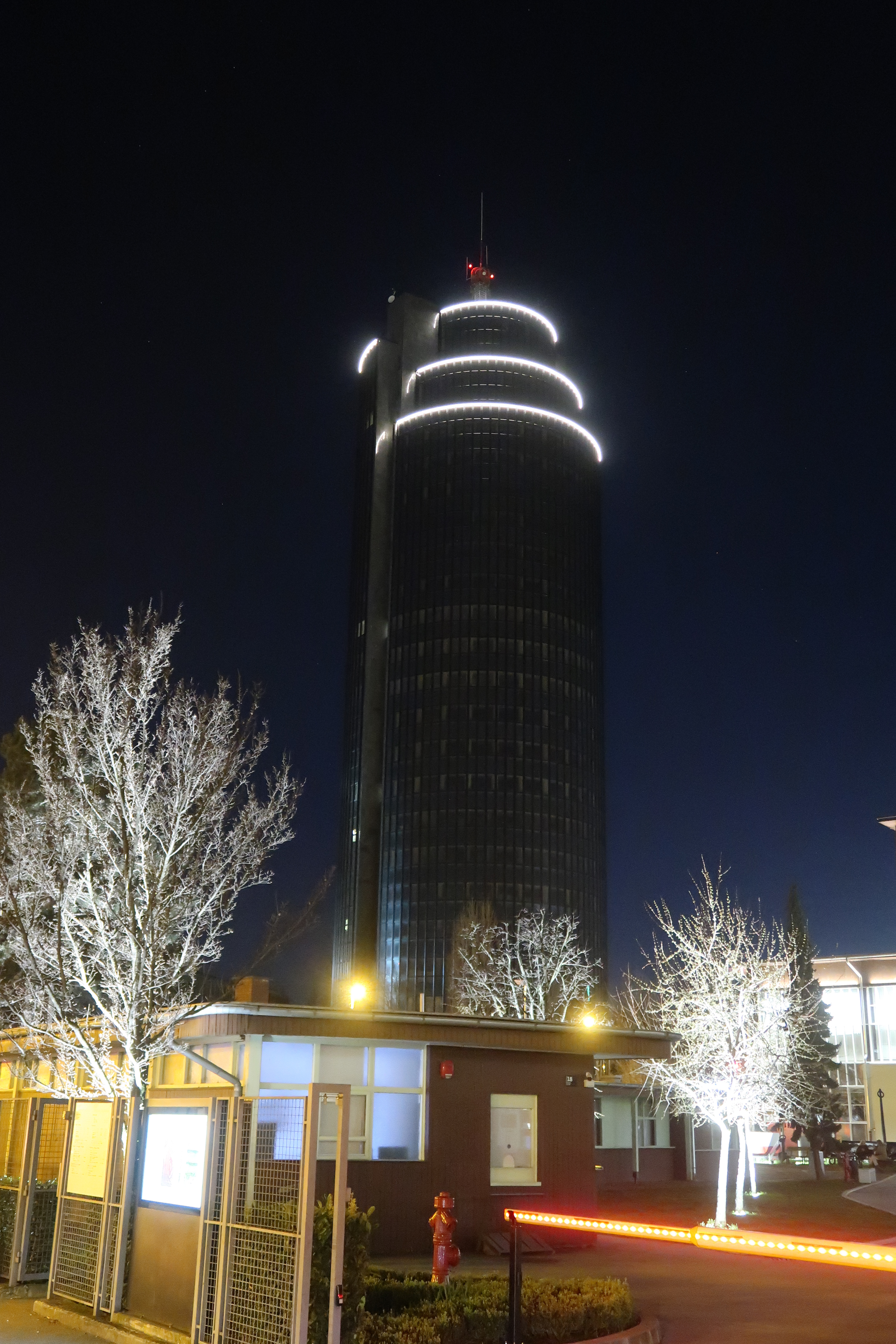
Cibona Tower in 2025 at night

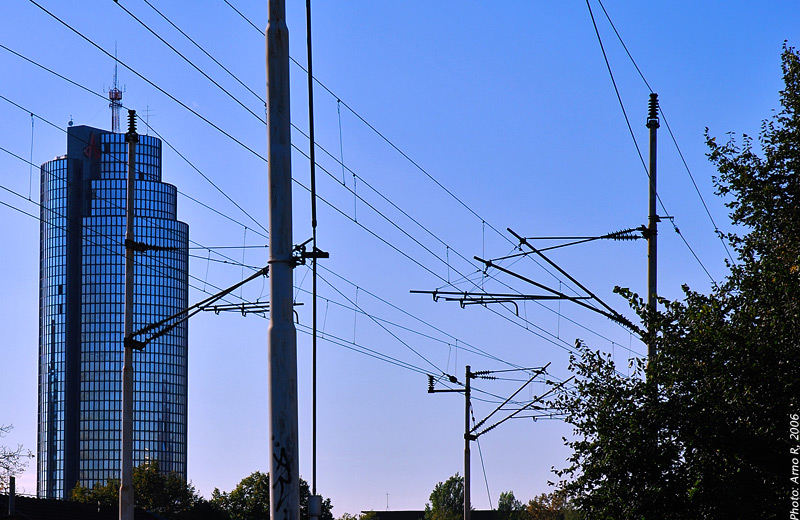
Cibona Tower from distance

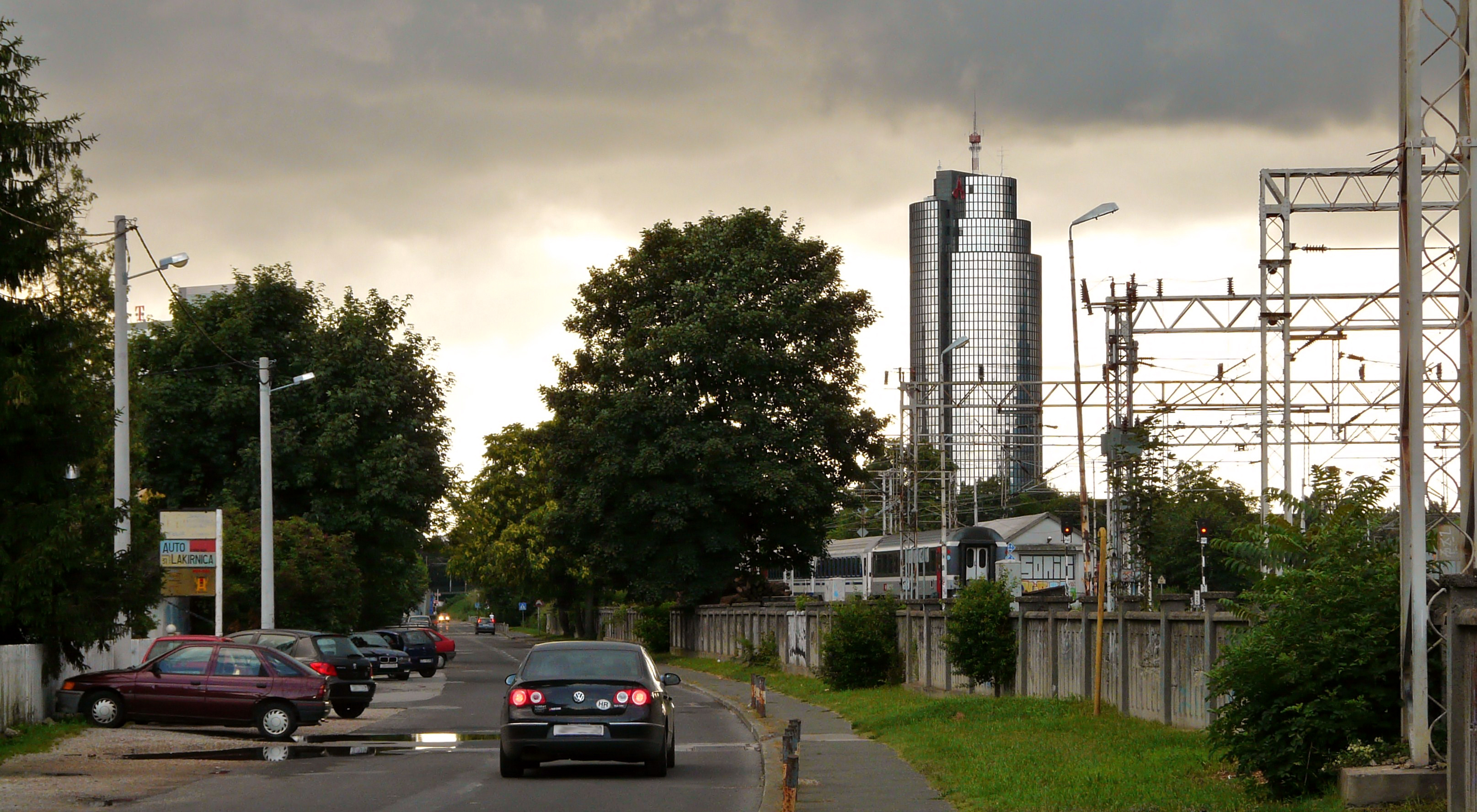
Cibona from the distance

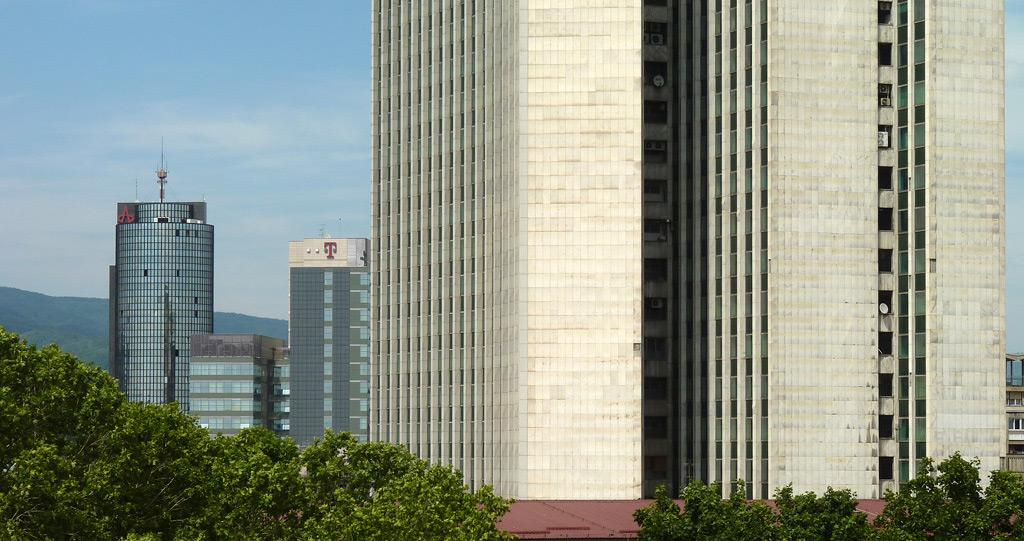
Cibona (left), HOTO Tower (middle) and Zagrepčanka right

== See also ==
- List of tallest buildings in Croatia
