= Ante Vukasović =

Croatian pedagogue (1929 - 2021)

Ante Vukasović (January 9, 1929, Osijek – January 26, 2021, Zagreb) was a Croatian pedagogue, comeniologist, university professor and scientific advisor.

== Biography ==
Born in 1929 in Osijek, Vukasović earned his pedagogy degrees at the University of Zagreb's Faculty of Philosophy. Subsequently, he worked as an elementary school teacher in Šestanovac and later as a high school teacher in Osijek.

In Zagreb, he taught as a university professor at the Department of Pedagogy of the Faculty of Philosophy of the University of Zagreb in the period from 1960 to 1993. Since 1979, he has been a scientific advisor at the same institution. He also held leadership roles such as Head of the Department and Institute of Pedagogy, as well as Director of the Center for Pedagogical Education and Research.

Vukasović actively contributed to social life as a member of the Croatian Academy of Sciences and Arts and the Croatian Pedagogical-Literary Choir. His remarkable contributions were recognized with various awards, including the AVNOJ Award, the "Vladimir Bakarić" Award, the "Franjo Rački" and the "Ivan Filipović" Award.

Vukasović's influential research, translated into multiple languages, focused on various pedagogical themes, including the theory and practice of education, moral education, intellectual development, the family's role in upbringing, the history of pedagogy, and comeniology. In addition to teaching, he also held positions of leadership. He served as the director of the Pedagogical Center in Osijek, and after relocating to Zagreb in 1960, he was the director of the University Center for Pedagogical Training and Research until he became a regular university professor and scientific advisor. Following that, he directed the UNFPA international scientific research project.

== Selected publications ==
- Utjecaj suvremene tehnike na koncepciju općeg obrazovanja, Zagreb, 1967.
- Vplyv sučasnej techniky na koncepciu všeobecneho vzdelania, Bratislava, 1968. (in Slovak)
- Vychovno-vzdelavaci system v SFRJ, Poprad, 1968. (in Slovak)
- Opće obrazovanje i reforma školskog sistema, Zagreb, 1968.
- Radni i tehnički odgoj, Zagreb, 1972.
- Edukata e punës dhe e teknikës në shkollat e arsimit të përgjithshëm, Prishtinë, 1972. (in Albanian)
- Intelektualni odgoj, Zagreb, 1976,
- Ndikimi i teknikës bashkëkohore në koncepcionin e arsimit të përgjithshëm, Prishtinë, 1977 (in Albanian)
- Fenomen odgoja, Zagreb, 1979,
- Odgoj za humane odnose i odgovorno roditeljstvo, 1984,
- Pedagogija, Zagreb, 1990,
- Etika, moral, osobnost, Zagreb, 1993,
- Obitelj – vrelo i nositeljica života, 1994,
- Jan Amos Komensky i Hrvati, 2007
