= Osijek =

- City
- Grad Osijek; City of Osijek
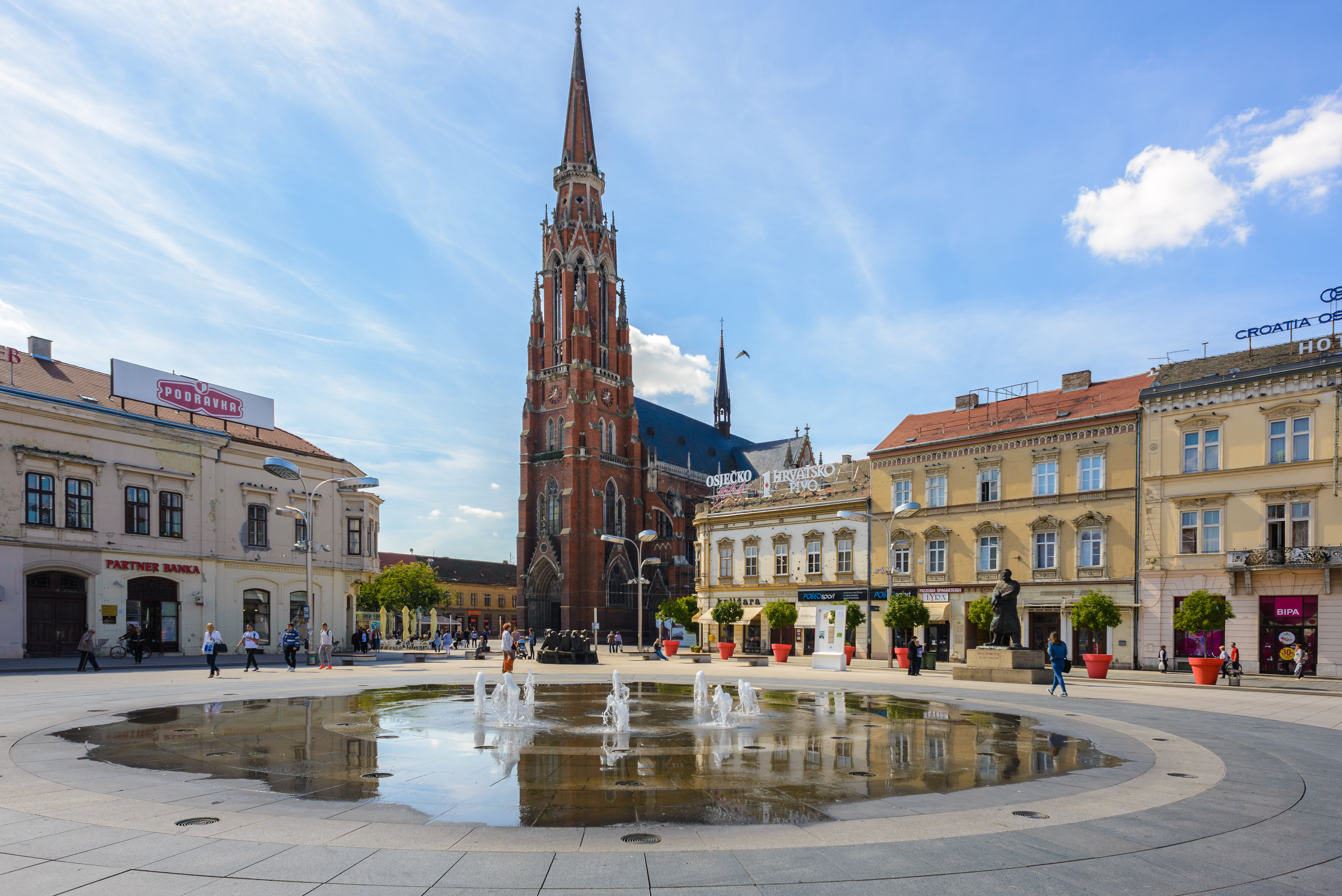
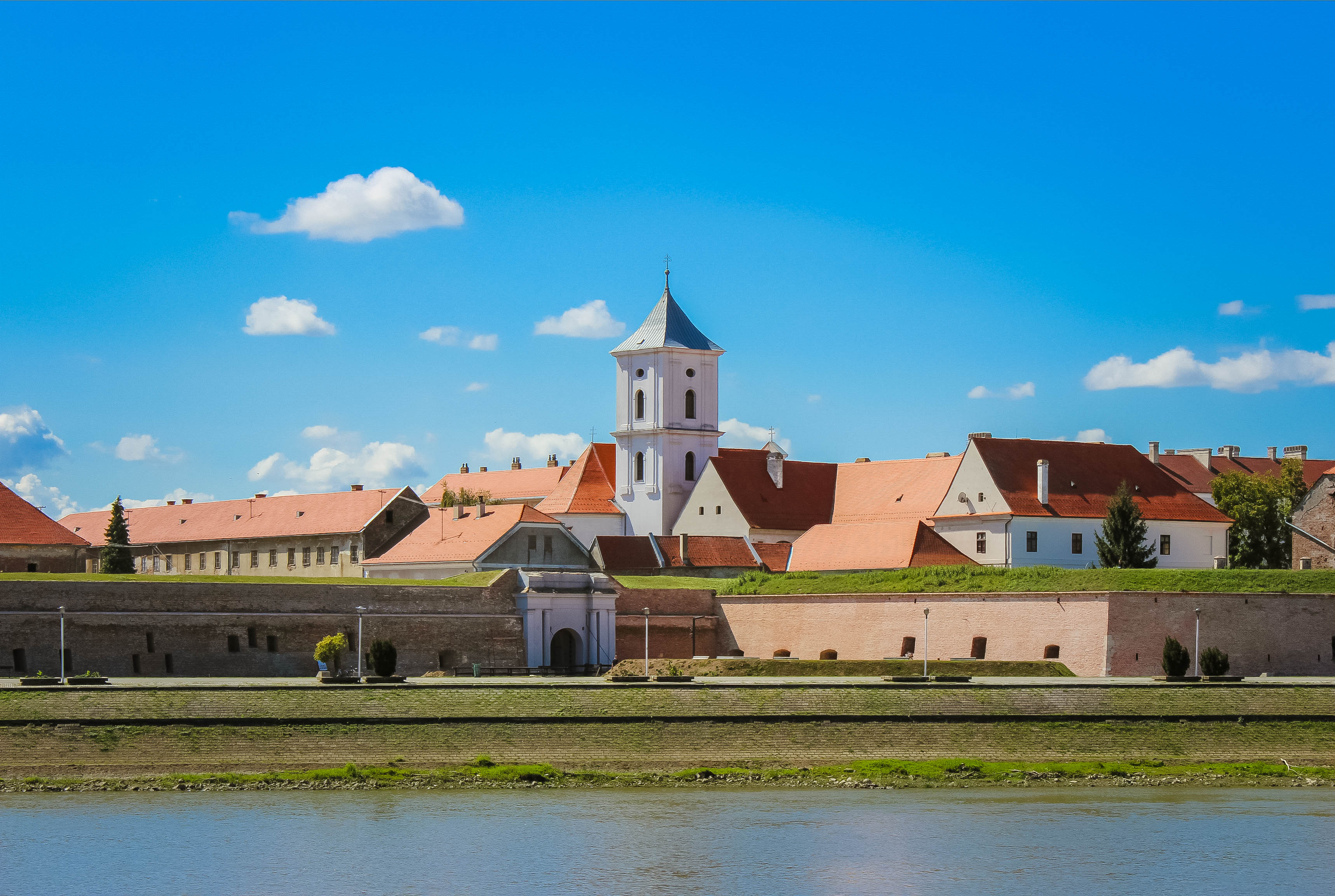
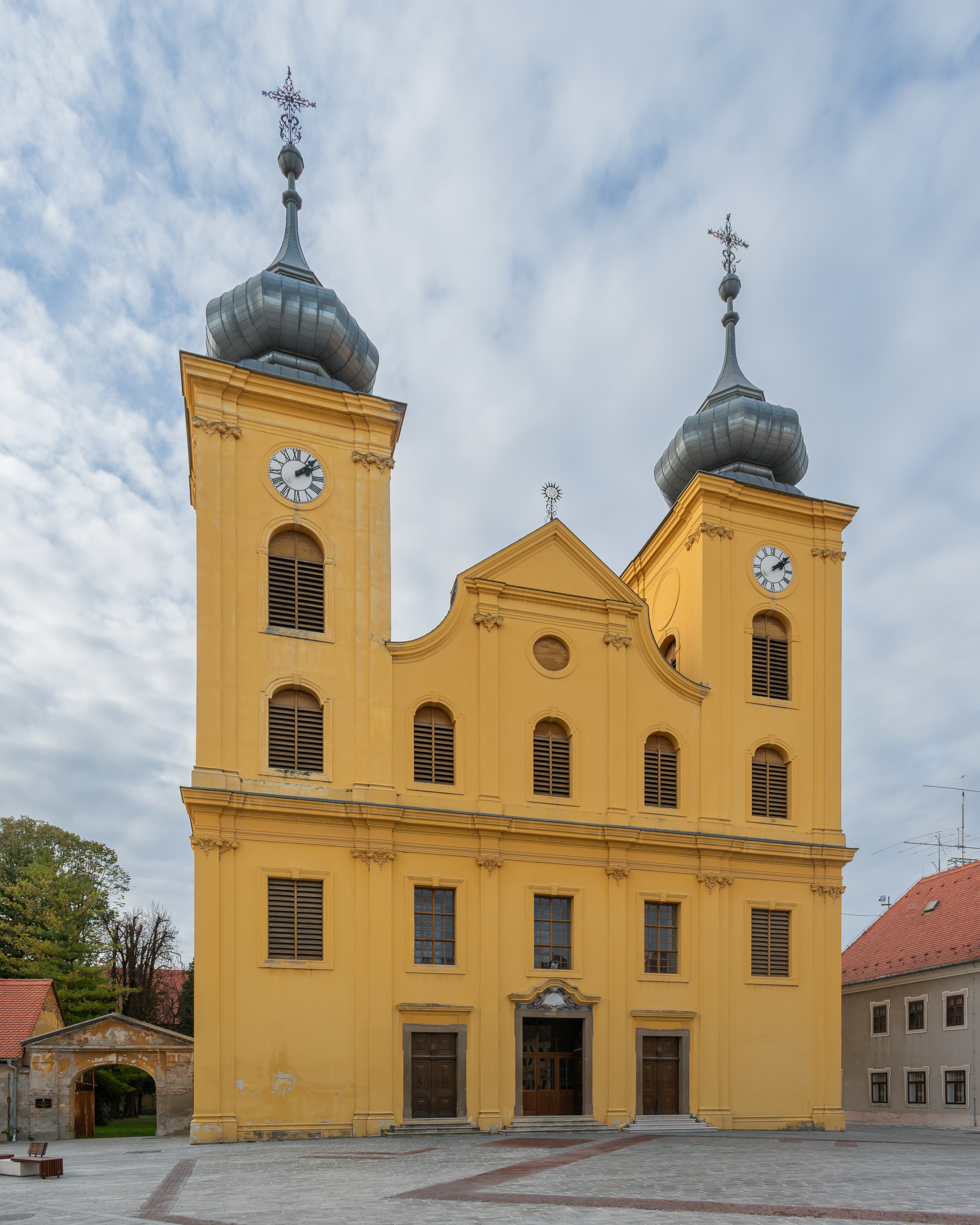
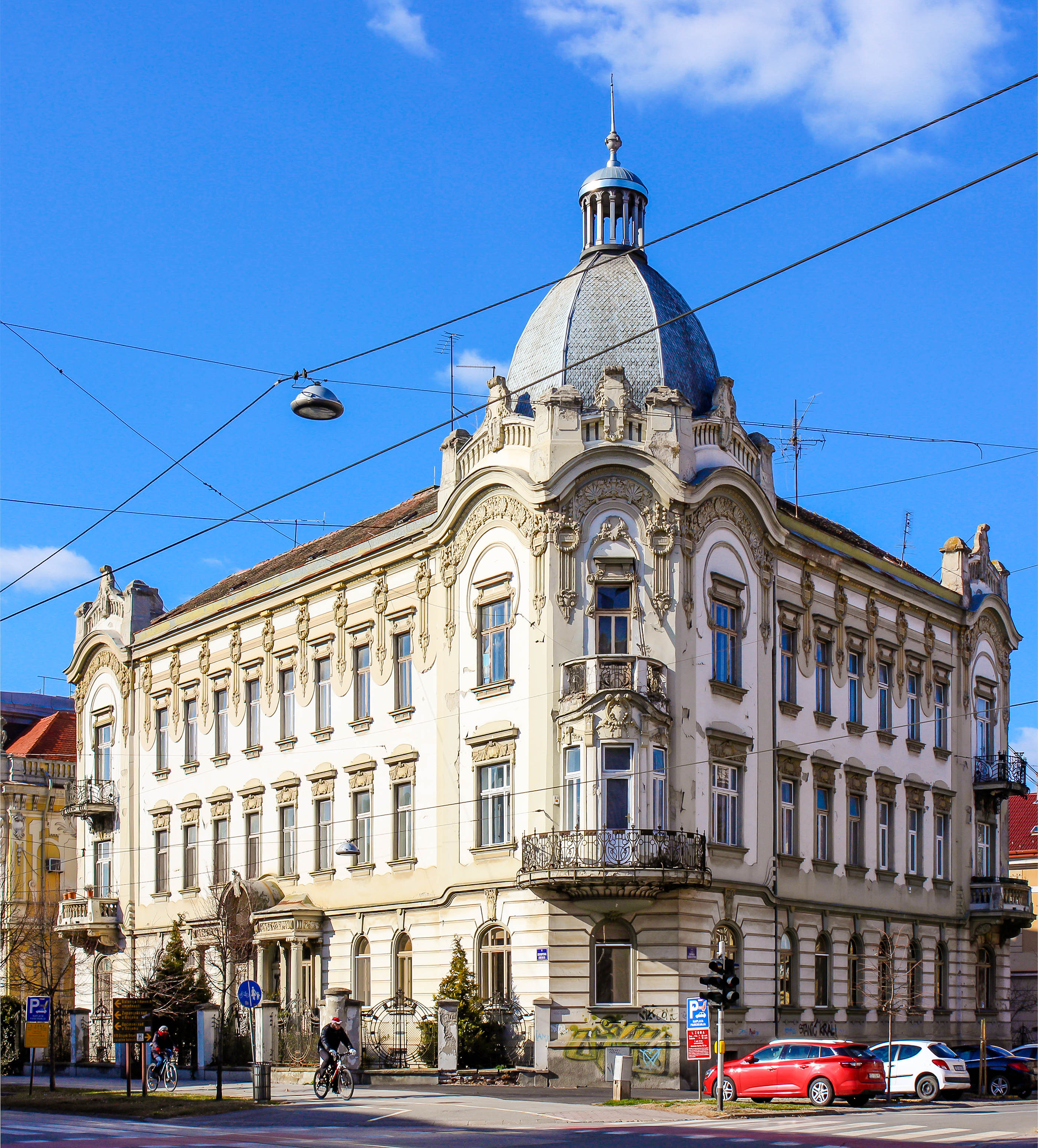
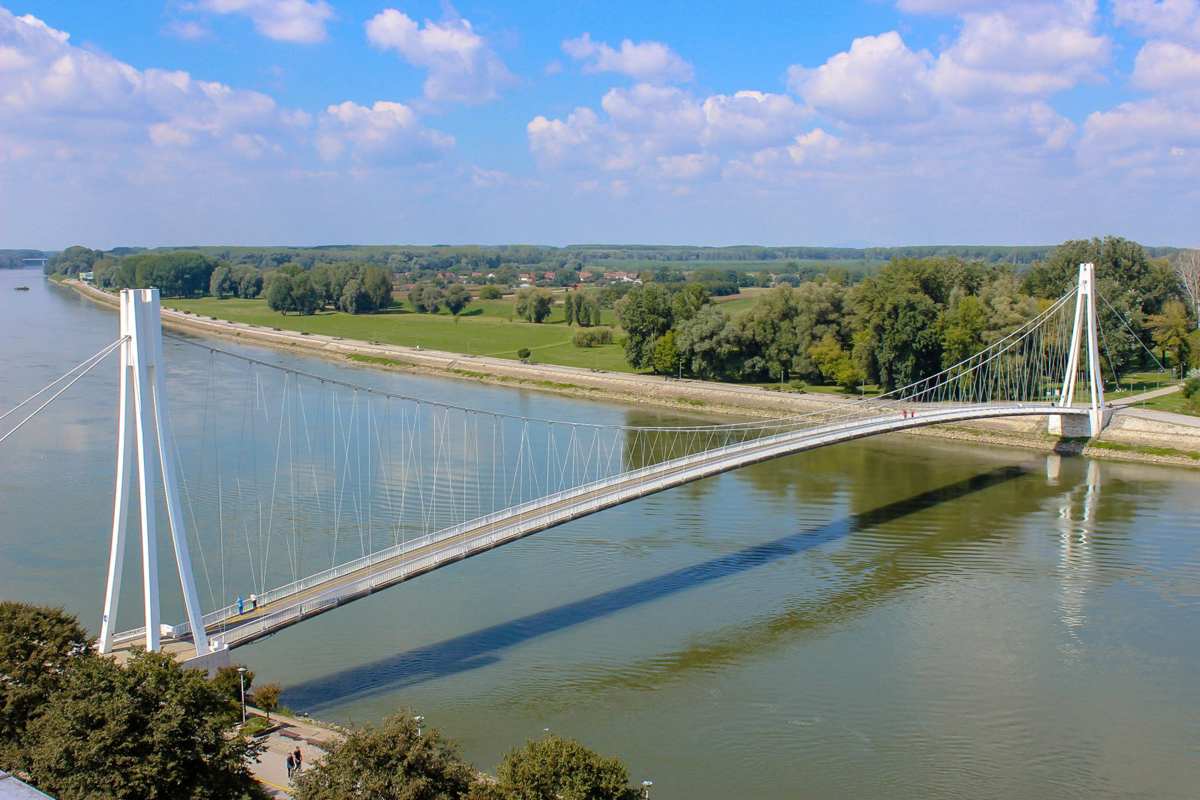
- Ante Starčević Square with Osijek Co-cathedral Tvrđa The City Guard Saint Michael Church European Avenue Statue of the Holy Trinity Palace of Slavonian General Command Pedestrian bridge

- Flag Coat of arms
- Nicknames: Grad na Dravi (City on Drava), Nepokoreni grad (Unconquered City)
- Interactive map of Osijek
- Location of Osijek in Croatia
- Coordinates: 45°33′20″N 18°41′40″E
- Country: Croatia
- Region: Slavonia (Podunavlje)
- County: Osijek-Baranja County

Government
  - Mayor: Ivan Radić (HDZ)
  - City Council: 31 members: • HDZ, NL Ante Đapića, ANU (14); • DP, Most (6); • SDP (6); • Možemo! (2); • Snaga SiB (2); • HNS, HSS, NS-R (1)
  - Electoral district: IV

Area
  - City: 174.9 km^{2} (67.5 sq mi)
  - Urban: 59.1 km^{2} (22.8 sq mi)
- Elevation: 94 m (308 ft)

Population (2021)
  - City: 96,313
  - Density: 550.7/km^{2} (1,426/sq mi)
  - Urban: 75,535
  - Urban density: 1,280/km^{2} (3,310/sq mi)
- Time zone: UTC+1 (CET)
  - Summer (DST): UTC+2 (CEST)
- Postal code: 31000
- Area code: 31
- Vehicle registration: OS
- Climate: Cfb
- Website: osijek.hr

Osijek (Croatian pronunciation: [ôsijeːk]) is the largest city and the economic and cultural hub of the eastern Croatian region of Slavonia, as well as the administrative seat of Osijek-Baranja County. It is the fourth-largest city in Croatia, with a population of 96,313 recorded in the 2021 census. The city is situated on the southern bank of the Drava River, 25 km (16 mi) upstream from its confluence with the Danube, at an elevation of 94 m (308 ft). Osijek is located 16 km (10 mi) west of the Croatia–Serbia border.

The history of Osijek extends back to Roman antiquity, when the settlement of Mursa developed in the area, which became an important Roman military and urban centre in the province of Pannonia. The medieval town developed around the same general area and is first recorded under the name Osijek in 1196. During the Middle Ages it became a market and trading settlement connecting the Pannonian with the Balkans. Suleiman Bridge was built in 1566, which was used in Ottoman–Habsburg wars. In 1685, Habsburg-Croatian forces launched a successful campaign toward Osijek, defeating an Ottoman army. The medieval settlement was located approximately where the present-day Tvrđa stands. In 1786, Tvrđa, Gornji Grad and Donji Grad were united into one city, and in 1809 Osijek became a Free Royal City. Between 1922 and 1929, it was the centre of Osijek Oblast, an administrative division of the Kingdom of Serbs, Croats and Slovenes.

During the Croatian War of Independence in the 1990s, Osijek was heavily attacked by the Yugoslav People's Army and Serbian forces. The Battle of Osijek and the surrounding fighting lasted mainly from 1991 to 1992, causing civilian casualties and significant damage to the city, which was later reconstructed and restored. Today, it is one of the main cultural, economic and educational centres of Slavonia, with its historic architecture reflecting Roman, Ottoman, Habsburg and modern Croatian history. Some of the cities landmarks include St. Peter and Paul Co-cathedral, Ante Starčević Square, Church of Saint Michael, Pedestrian bridge, The City Guard, County Palace, Pejačević Castle, Palace of Slavonian General Command, Osijek Archaeological Museum and City and University Library.

== Name ==
Osijek's name originates from its location on elevated ground, which afforded protection from floods in the surrounding swamp areas. It derives from the Croatian word oseka, meaning "ebb tide." Due to its history under the Habsburg monarchy and Ottoman Empire, as well as its diverse ethnic minorities, the city is known by various names in other languages: Eszék in Hungarian, Esseg in German, Ösek in Turkish, and Mursa in Latin. The English name for the city is Osijek.

== History ==
=== Origins ===
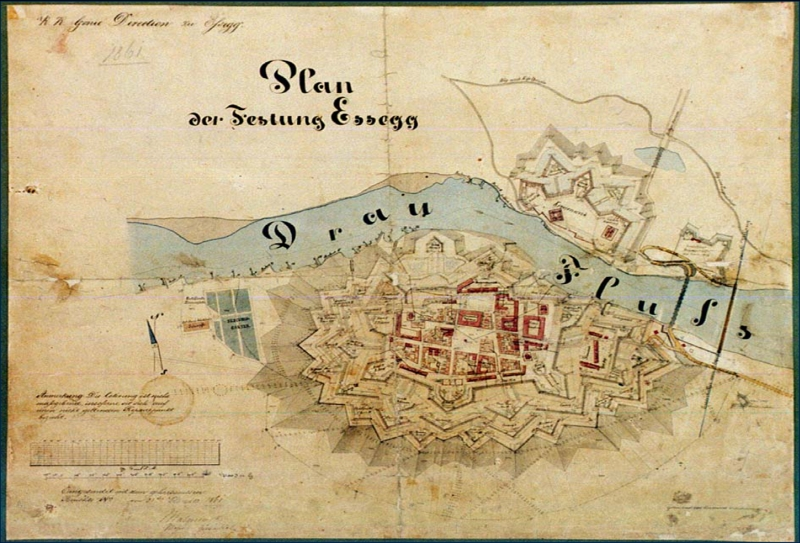
Plan of Tvrđa in Osijek 1861

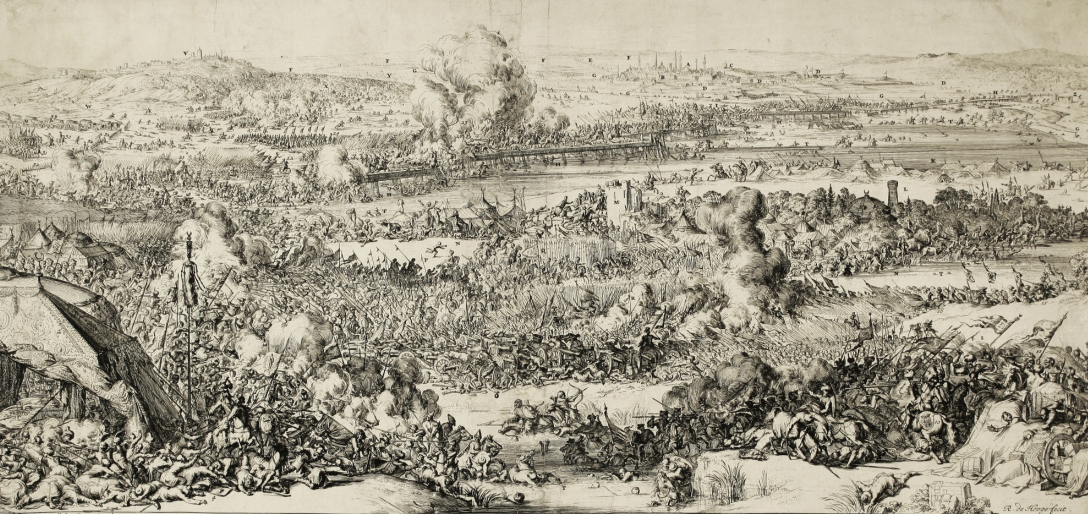
Battle of Osijek, fought on 11 August 1685 between the Imperial Habsburg army, commanded by James, 2nd Count Leslie, and the Turks, resulting in an Habsburg victory

The Retreat near Osijek, 1687 refers to a strategic maneuver by the Habsburg imperial army during the Great Turkish War (1683–1699), which directly preceded the famous Second Battle of Mohács (also known as the Battle of Mount Harsány).

Human habitation in the Osijek area dates to the Neolithic period. The first known inhabitants were the Illyrian tribe of the Andizetes. During the second half of the 4th century BC, the settlement was attacked and subsequently captured by the Celtic Scordisci, who established a permanent presence there.

Following the Roman conquest of Pannonia, the settlement—then known as Mursa—was garrisoned by the Roman Seventh Legion. The legion administered the area from a military castrum and built a bridge across the Drava River. Historical evidence suggests that Emperor Hadrian founded this settlement as a new foundation. He later elevated Mursa to a colony with special privileges in 133 AD. The subsequent history of Mursa was marked by turbulence, as several decisive battles were fought in its vicinity. These conflicts had profound consequences for the colony and the wider region, which was already strained due to the westward migration of various tribes—including the Alemanni, Gepids, Goths, Marcomanni, and Vandals—who were displaced by the invading Huns. After the collapse of the Western Roman Empire and the Avar Khaganate's destruction of local tribes in the 6th century, the region was repopulated by Slavic tribes during their mass migrating to Southeastern Europe in the Early Middle Ages, between the 6th and 7th centuries.

The earliest recorded mention of Osijek dates to 1196. From 1353 to 1472, the town was a feudal possession of the Kórógyi family. Following the death of the last Kórógyi, King Matthias Corvinus transferred authority over Osijek to the Rozgonyi family. The city was subsequently sacked and nearly destroyed by an invading Ottoman army on 8 August 1526, just prior to the Battle of Mohács. A permanent Turkish garrison was established in 1529, after which the Ottoman rebuilt the city in an oriental style; it appears in the Ottoman census of 1579. In 1566, Suleiman the Magnificent commissioned an 8-kilometre-long, wooden pontoon bridge at Osijek, a structure renowned in its time as one of the wonders of the world. Under Ottoman administration, Osijek was part of the Sanjak of Pojega within the Budin Eyalet and grew into a significant commercial centre for East-West trade.

Osijek was captured by Habsburg forces on 29 September 1687, following the Second Battle of Mohács; this ended over 150 years of Ottoman rule over the city.

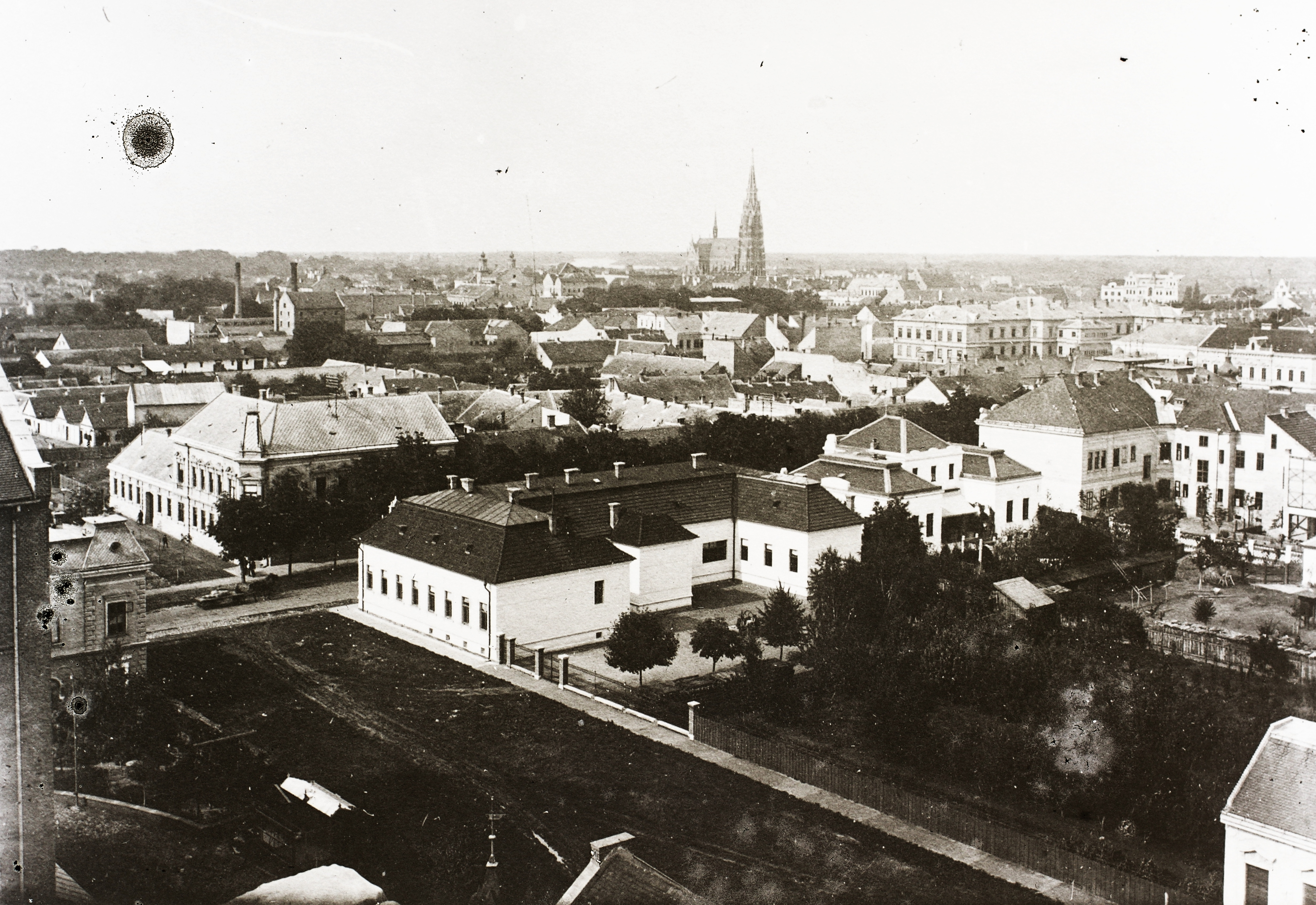
Osijek in 1904

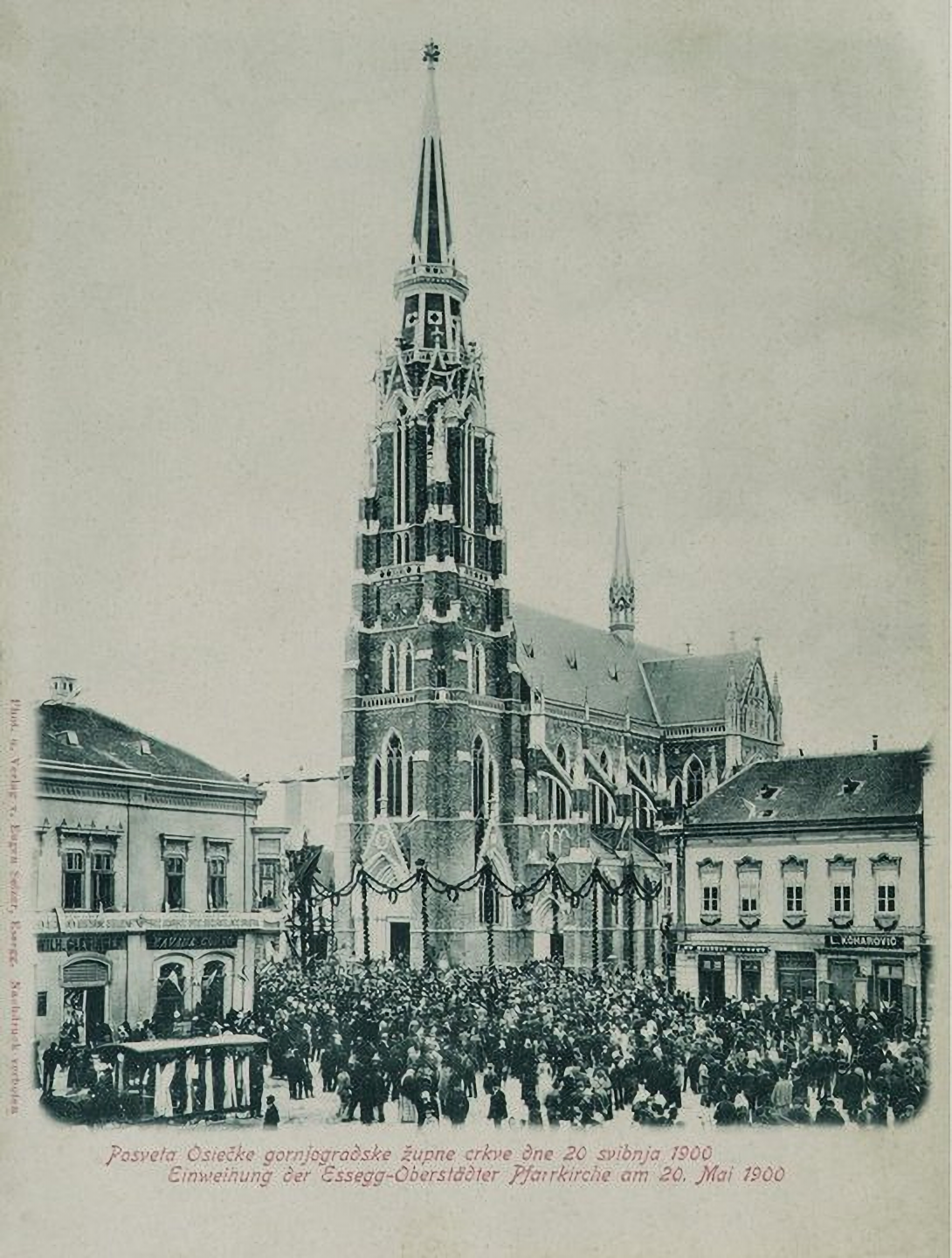
Osijek Co-cathedral from the 19th century. Pictured: dedication of the co-cathedral in Osijek

=== Habsburg Empire ===
Following its integration into the Habsburg Empire, Osijek underwent significant reconstruction. Between 1712 and 1715, Austrian authorities built a new fortress, known as Tvrđa, in the town's center. Designed by Austrian architect Maximilian Gosseau de Henef, it was completed with outer walls and all five of its planned bastions. The central Holy Trinity Square is framed by the Military Command building to the north, the Main Guard building to the west, and the Magistrate building (now the Museum of Slavonia) to the east. At its center, a monument to the plague was erected in 1729 by the widow of General Maximilian Petras.

The Gornji Grad (Upper Town) was established in 1692, followed shortly by the Donji Grad (Lower Town) in 1698. These districts were primarily settled by inhabitants from the swampy Baranja region. Tvrđa, Gornji Grad, and Donji Grad operated as separate municipalities until 1786, when they were unified into a single administrative entity. In the late 18th century, Osijek superseded Virovitica as the seat of Virovitica County. During this period, the Habsburg Empire encouraged the migration and settlement of German immigrants into the town and surrounding region, which led to the development of a distinctive local German dialect known as Essekerisch.

In 1809, Osijek was granted the title of a Free Royal City, and during the early 19th century, it was the largest city in Croatia. The city developed along the lines of other central European cities, with cultural, architectural, and socio-economic influences filtering down from Vienna and Buda. At the beginning of the Hungarian Revolution of 1848, the town was initially held by Hungarian forces but was captured by the Austrians under General Baron Trebersberg on 4 February 1849.

In the late 19th and early 20th centuries, Osijek was the seat of the Virovitica County of the autonomous territory of the Kingdom of Croatia-Slavonia in Austria-Hungary.

During the 19th century, cultural life in Osijek flourished around its theatres, museums, collections, and printing houses, notably those run by the Franciscans. The first museum, the Museum of Slavonia, was founded in 1877 through private donations. A prosperous economy and expanding trade relations fostered a vibrant society, characterized by religious festivals, public fairs, entertainment, and sporting events. This period of growth also saw significant urban expansion with the construction of the Novi Grad (New Town) district and the development of the Retfala area to the west.

=== Twentieth century ===
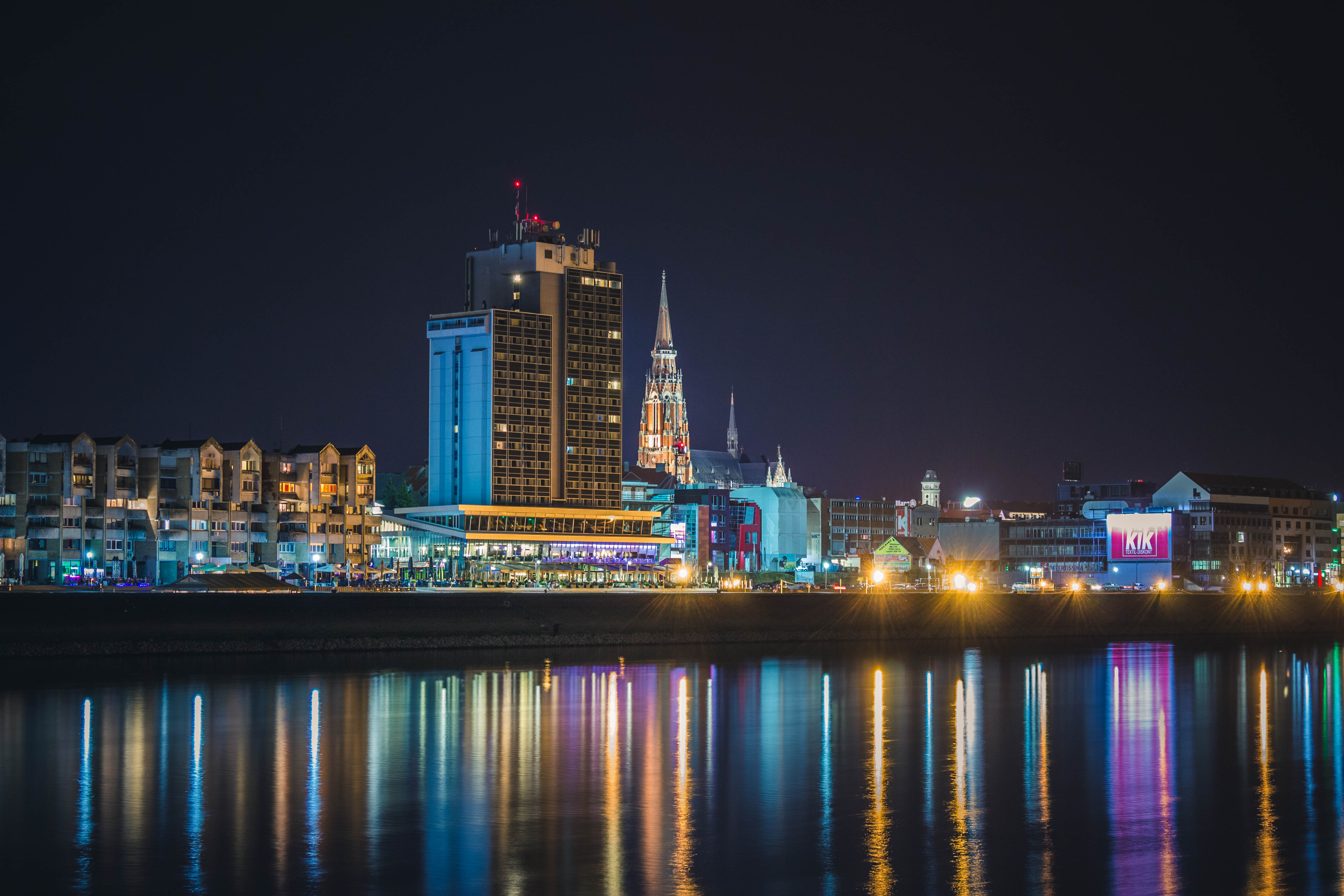
Osijek promenade at night

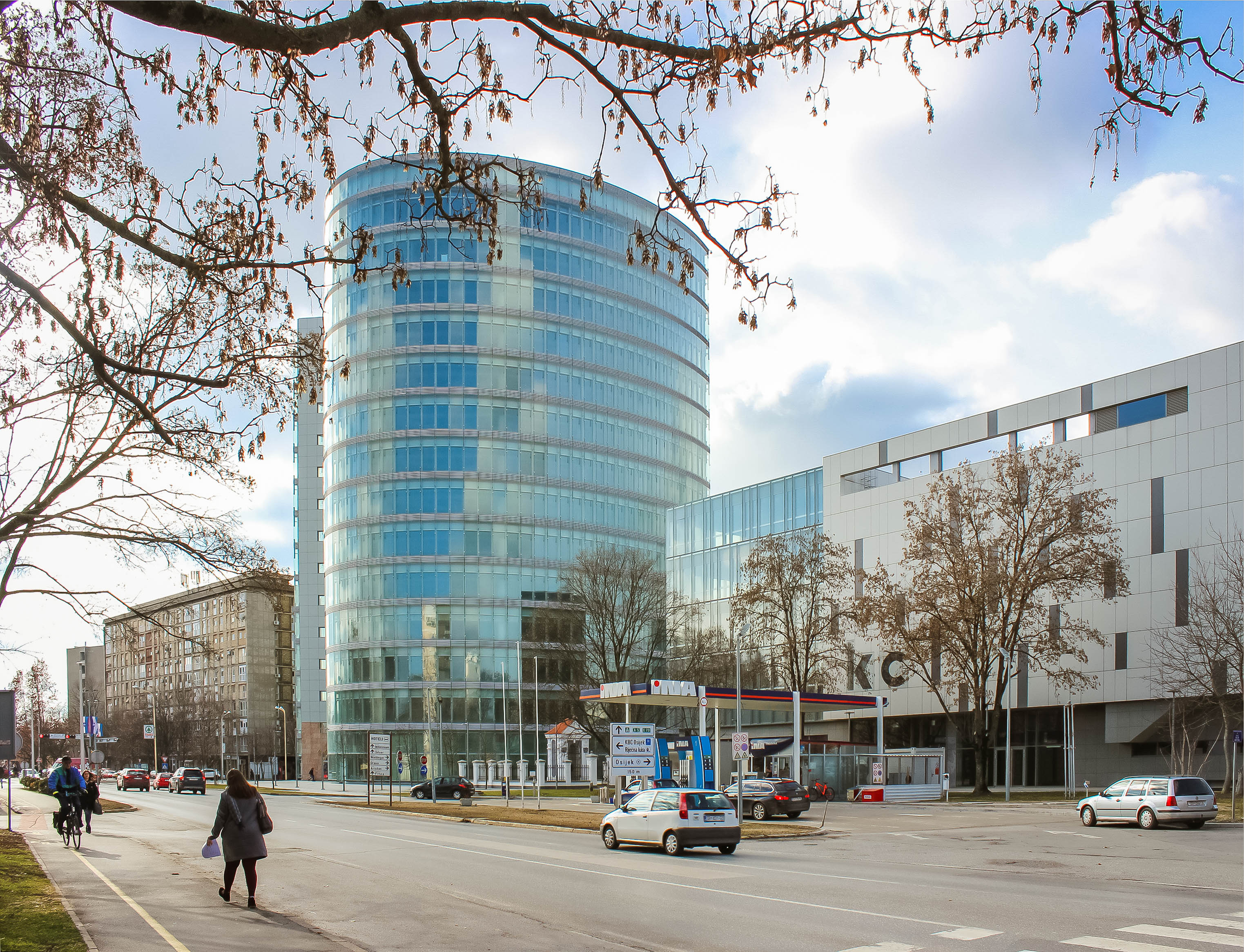
Eurodom business complex

The city expanded in the 20th century with the development of new residential districts, including Sjenjak, Vijenac, Ivana Meštrovića, Novi Grad, and Jug II. Osijek's riverside setting and its cultural and historical heritage, most notably the Baroque citadel of Tvrđa—one of the most distinctive architectural complexes in the region—have been significant factors in the growth of its tourism sector. Separately, during World War II, the Osijek oil refinery was a target for Allied bombing raids as part of the broader Oil Campaign.

In the aftermath of the war, the local German-speaking population was expelled. The daily newspaper Glas Slavonije was relocated to Osijek, where it has been published ever since. The post-war period saw the establishment of several key institutions: the city's historical archive was founded in 1947, followed by the city library (GISKO) in 1949. This cultural expansion continued with the opening of a children's theatre and an art gallery. For public safety, the volunteer fire department DVD "Hrvatska Elektroprivreda" was founded in 1950, operating separately from the DVD "Vodovod", which had been established in 1947. Continuing the tradition of promoting national heritage, especially in music and the arts, the tamburitza band "Pajo Kolarić" was founded on 21 March 1954.

Osijek's modern infrastructure began to develop significantly in the late 1950s and 1960s. In 1958, it was connected to Zagreb and Belgrade by a modern paved road, and a new bridge over the Drava River was constructed to the north in 1962. This period also saw the foundation of higher education in the city. The first faculty was the Faculty of Economy (established in 1959 as a study centre of the University of Zagreb), which was immediately followed by schools that would become the Faculty of Agriculture and the Faculty of Philosophy. The founding of the Faculty of Law in 1975 marked a key milestone, as it became a charter member of the newly established University of Osijek.

Concurrently, Osijek solidified its role as a regional centre for food and agriculture, exemplified by the establishment of a major agricultural collective in 1962. Further enhancing city life, a new pedestrian suspension bridge was built over the Drava River in the 1980s.

==== Croatian War of Independence ====
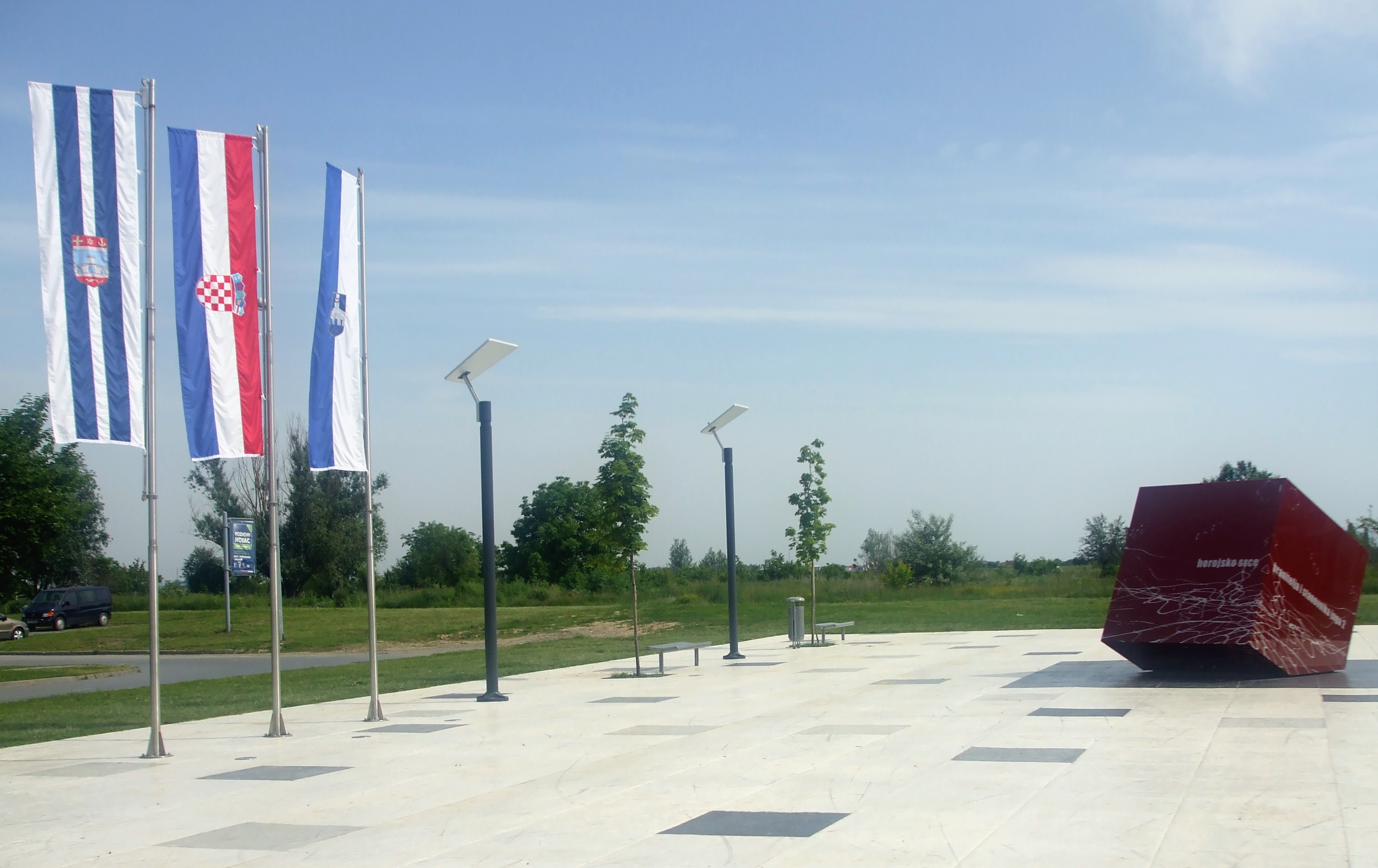
War of Independence memorial

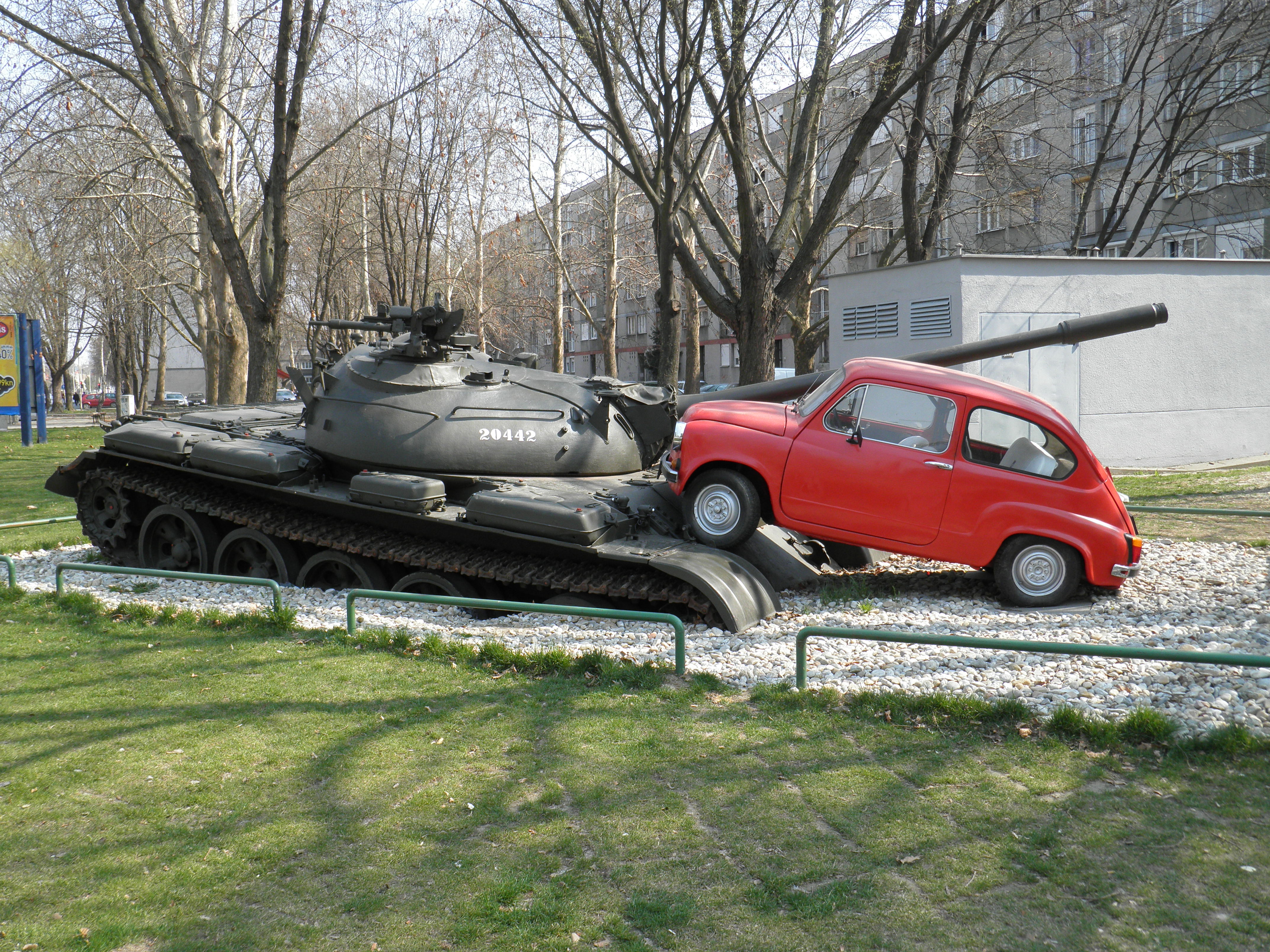
Red Fićo installation

During the Croatian War of Independence (1991–1995), Osijek sustained extensive damage from prolonged shelling by the Yugoslav People's Army (JNA) and Serbian paramilitary units, notably the Serb Volunteer Guard under Željko Ražnatović. The city centre, including the Co-cathedral of St. Peter and St. Paul, and outlying areas were heavily damaged. From August 1991 to June 1992 alone, approximately 800 people were killed by the shelling. Overall, the war claimed the lives of 1,724 residents of Osijek, including 1,327 soldiers and 397 civilians. Separately, several Croatian officials, including General Branimir Glavaš, were subsequently convicted of war crimes against Serb civilians in the city.

== Climate ==
Osijek has an oceanic climate (Köppen climate classification Cfb).

Since records began in 1981, the highest temperature recorded at the airport, at an elevation of 88 metres (289 ft), was 40.6 °C (105.1 °F), on 24 July 2007. The coldest temperature was −26.2 °C (−15.2 °F), on 9 February 2012. The highest temperature recorded in Osijek itself, where records began in 1899, was 40.3 °C (104.5 °F), on both 1 July 1950 and 24 August 2012. The coldest temperature was −27.1 °C (−16.8 °F), on 31 January 1987. From 1981 to 1991, the lowest temperature at the RC Čepin station was −27.4 °C (−17.3 °F), on 31 January 1987. Since records began in 2011, the coldest temperature at the Tvrđavica station was −25.6 °C (−14.1 °F), on 9 February 2012.

Climate data for Osijek (1971–2000, extremes 1899–2014)
Month	Jan	Feb	Mar	Apr	May	Jun	Jul	Aug	Sep	Oct	Nov	Dec	Year
Record high °C (°F)	19.0 (66.2)	23.0 (73.4)	26.9 (80.4)	30.9 (87.6)	36.0 (96.8)	39.6 (103.3)	40.3 (104.5)	40.3 (104.5)	37.1 (98.8)	30.5 (86.9)	25.8 (78.4)	21.3 (70.3)	40.3 (104.5)
Mean daily maximum °C (°F)	3.3 (37.9)	6.5 (43.7)	12.3 (54.1)	17.2 (63.0)	22.6 (72.7)	25.6 (78.1)	27.6 (81.7)	27.5 (81.5)	23.4 (74.1)	17.4 (63.3)	9.4 (48.9)	4.7 (40.5)	16.5 (61.7)
Daily mean °C (°F)	−0.2 (31.6)	1.8 (35.2)	6.4 (43.5)	11.2 (52.2)	16.7 (62.1)	19.7 (67.5)	21.3 (70.3)	20.8 (69.4)	16.5 (61.7)	11.0 (51.8)	5.1 (41.2)	1.2 (34.2)	11.0 (51.8)
Mean daily minimum °C (°F)	−3.3 (26.1)	−2.1 (28.2)	1.3 (34.3)	5.5 (41.9)	10.5 (50.9)	13.6 (56.5)	14.8 (58.6)	14.5 (58.1)	10.8 (51.4)	6.1 (43.0)	1.6 (34.9)	−1.7 (28.9)	6.0 (42.8)
Record low °C (°F)	−27.1 (−16.8)	−26.4 (−15.5)	−21 (−6)	−6.8 (19.8)	−3 (27)	1.0 (33.8)	4.7 (40.5)	5.1 (41.2)	−1.2 (29.8)	−8.6 (16.5)	−15.7 (3.7)	−23.2 (−9.8)	−27.1 (−16.8)
Average precipitation mm (inches)	41.4 (1.63)	35.1 (1.38)	40.5 (1.59)	51.0 (2.01)	59.2 (2.33)	82.0 (3.23)	65.4 (2.57)	61.9 (2.44)	51.0 (2.01)	56.6 (2.23)	61.7 (2.43)	49.1 (1.93)	654.9 (25.78)
Average precipitation days (≥ 0.1 mm)	11.3	10.6	11.2	13.0	13.3	13.4	10.6	9.9	9.4	10.5	11.7	12.3	137.2
Average snowy days (≥ 1.0 cm)	10.3	7.8	2.1	0.0	0.0	0.0	0.0	0.0	0.0	0.0	2.2	6.5	28.9
Average relative humidity (%)	87.5	81.9	74.1	71.3	70.1	70.9	69.6	71.8	76.2	79.2	86.1	88.5	77.3
Mean monthly sunshine hours	58.9	96.1	145.7	171.0	217.0	231.0	260.4	251.1	189.0	142.6	69.0	55.8	1,887.6
Percentage possible sunshine	20	34	42	45	52	55	60	61	53	44	25	21	45
Source: Croatian Meteorological and Hydrological Service

== Population ==
Historical population of Osijek
Year	Pop.	±%
1880	25,260	—
1890	27,801	+10.1%
1900	33,407	+20.2%
1910	40,106	+20.1%
1921	42,930	+7.0%
1931	51,871	+20.8%
1948	58,046	+11.9%
1953	66,073	+13.8%
1961	84,652	+28.1%
1971	109,189	+29.0%
1981	123,944	+13.5%
1991	129,792	+4.7%
2001	114,616	−11.7%
2011	108,048	−5.7%
2021	96,848	−10.4%
Source: Naselja i stanovništvo Republike Hrvatske 1857–2001, DZS, Zagreb, 2005

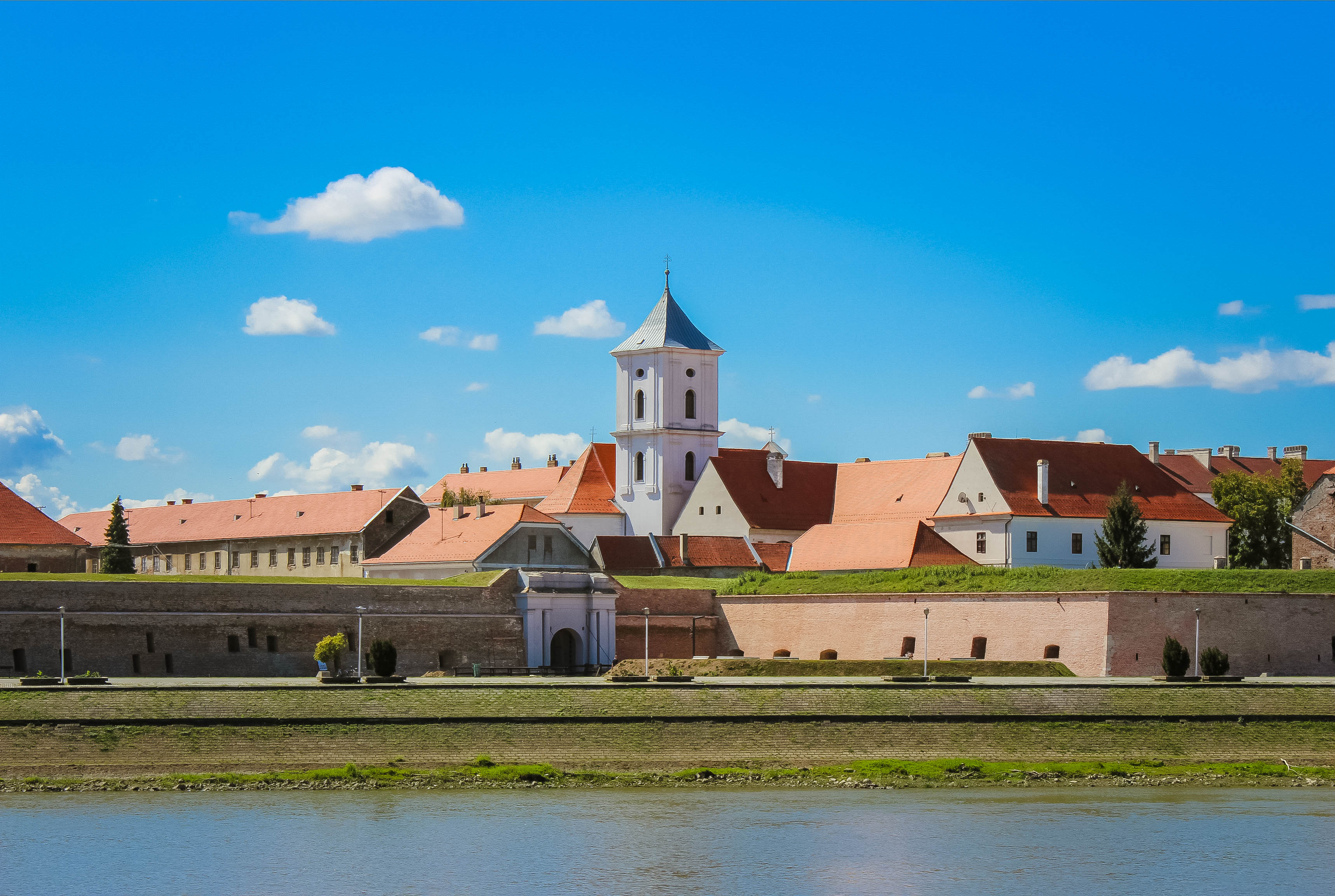
Osijek Old Town, Tvrđa

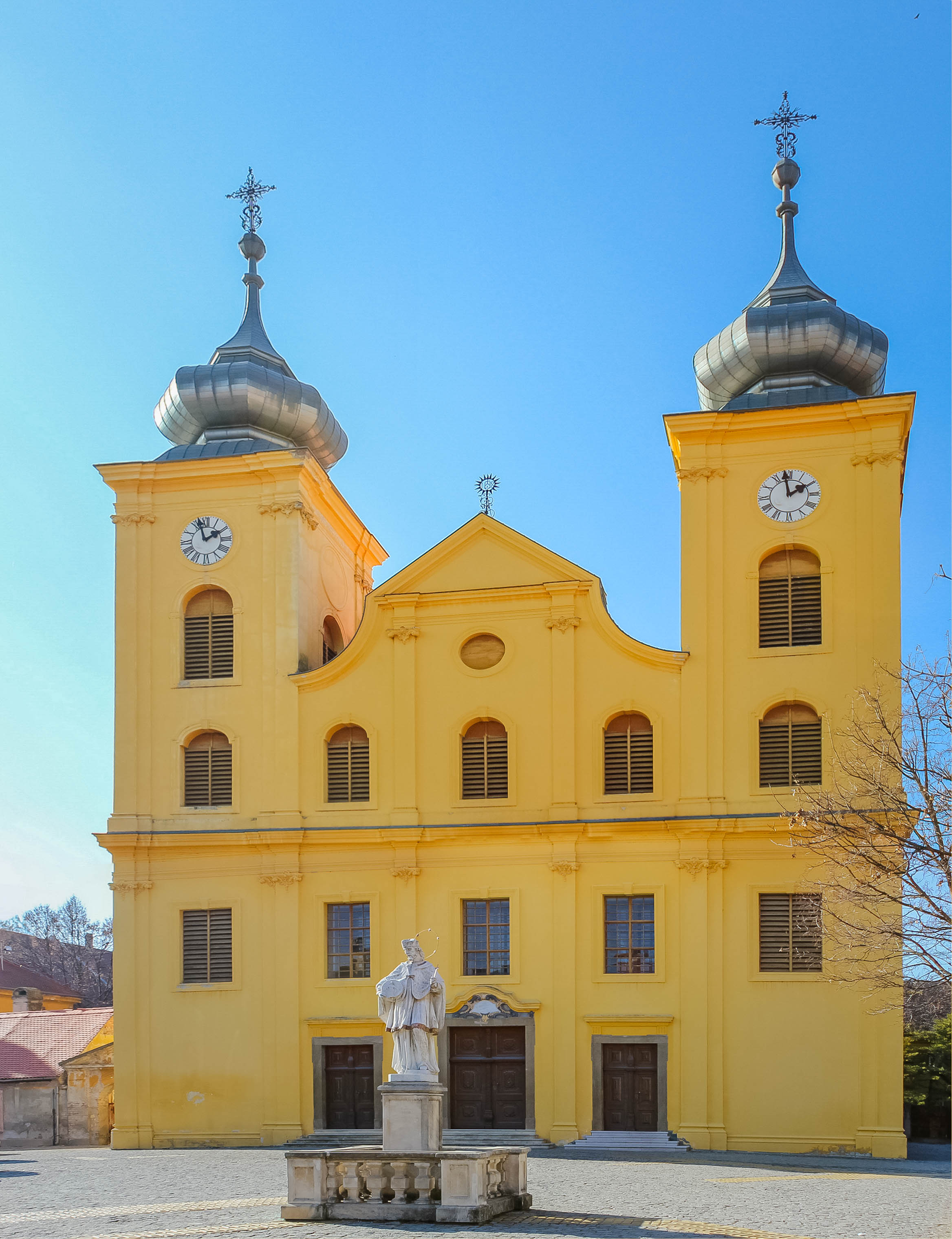
Church of Saint Michael

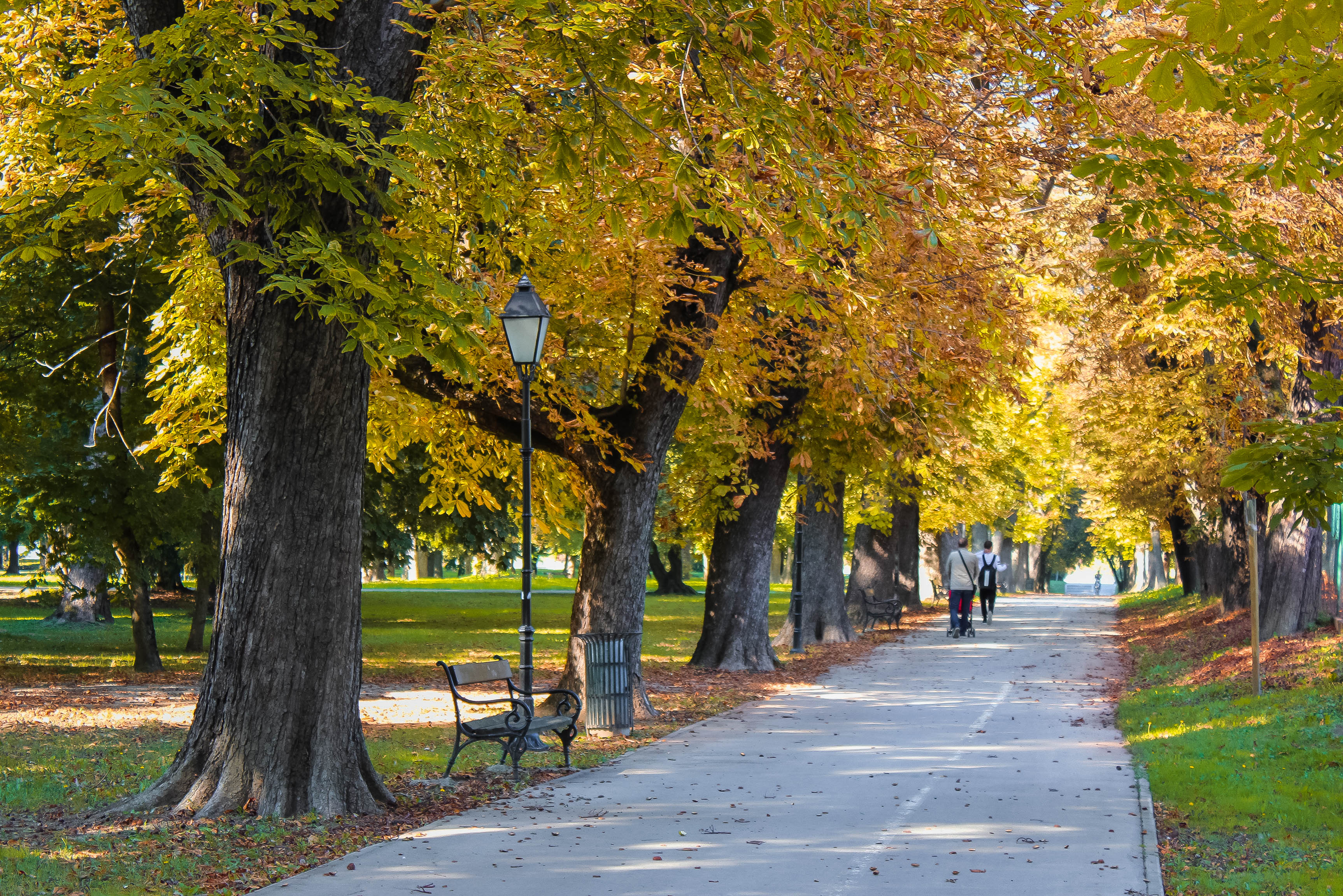
King Tomislav Park, Osijek is considered the greenest city in Croatia due to its numerous parks, green spaces, and strong focus on environmental initiatives

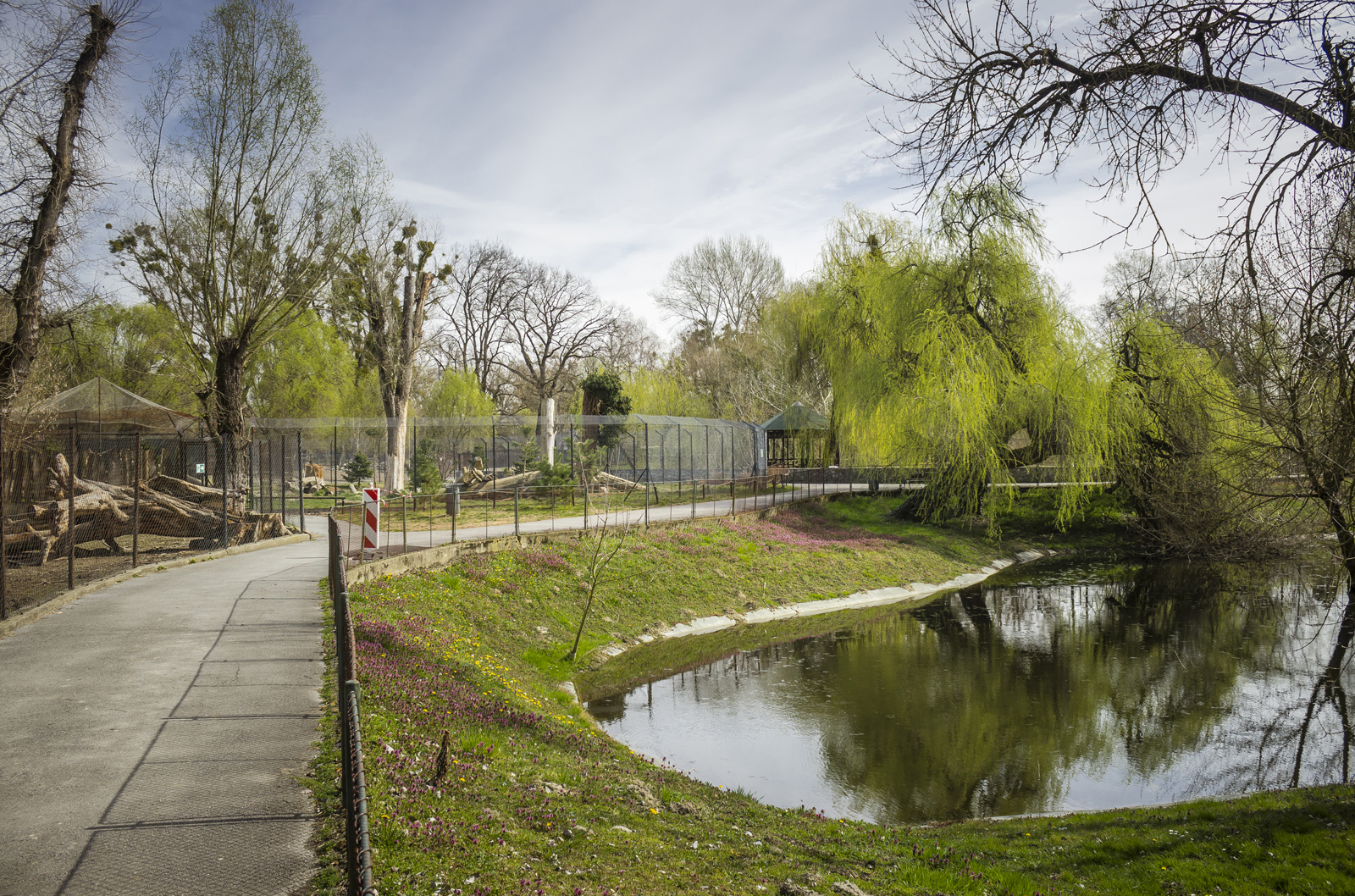
Osijek Zoo and Aquarium, the biggest Zoo in Croatia

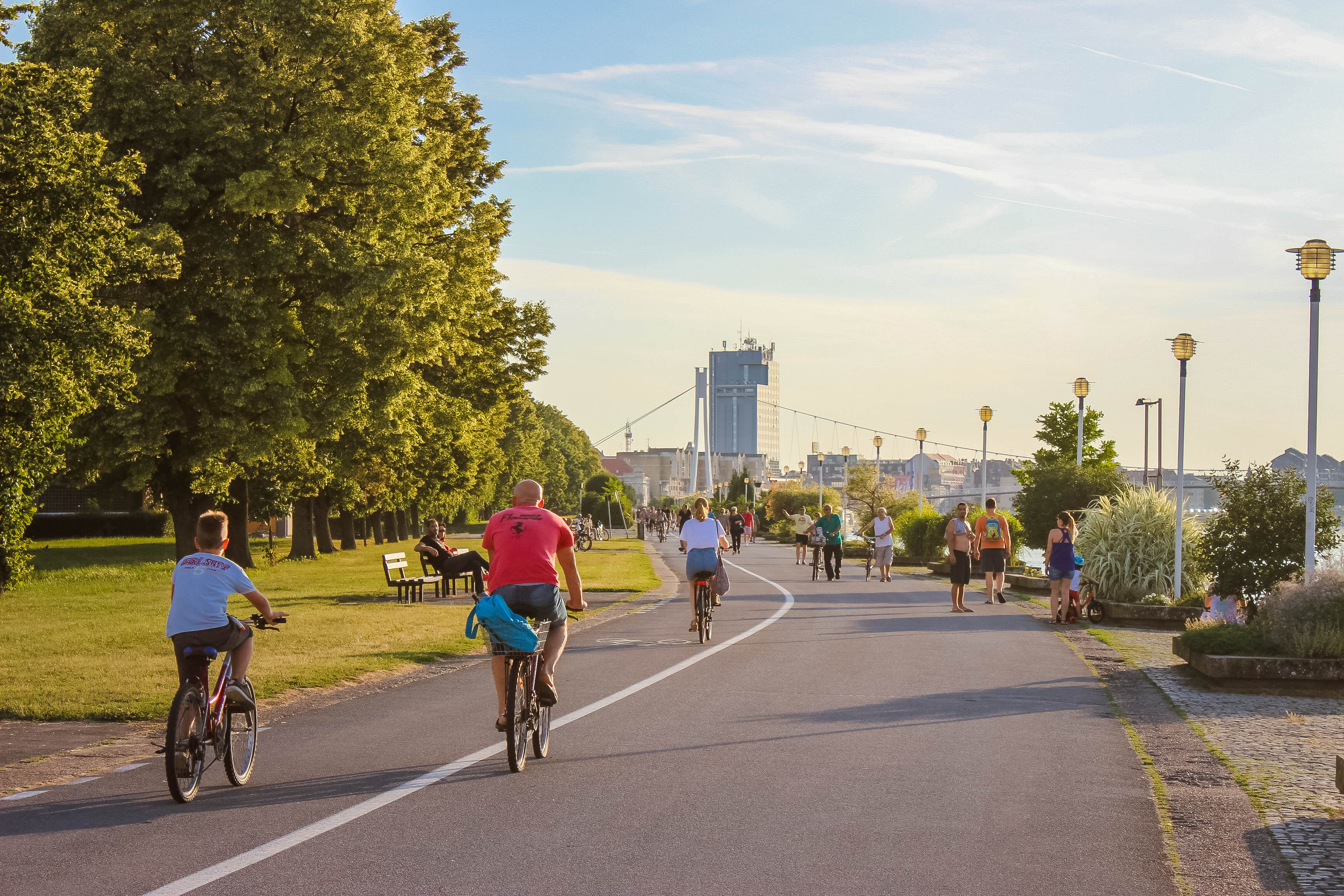
Osijek promenade

According to the 1910 census, the city of Osijek had 31,388 inhabitants. The official Austrian census lists 12,625 as Croats, 11,269 as Germans or Danube Swabians, 3,729 as Hungarians, 2,889 as Serbs, and 876 others. When categorised by religion, there were 24,976 Roman Catholics, 2,943 Orthodox Christians, 2,340 Jews, 594 Reformed (Calvinists), 385 Evangelicals, 122 Greek Catholics, and 28 others. After World War II, a significant part of the Danube Swabian population was forcibly expelled by the Yugoslav communist authorities as a form of revenge for their presumed participation in the German occupation of Yugoslavia. Their property was first confiscated, then nationalized, and, afterwards, redistributed to World War II victims.

According to the 1981 census, the total population of the city had reached 104,775, including 63,373 (60.48%) Croats, 13,716 (13.09%) Serbs, and 1,521 (1.45%) Hungarians.

Prior to the Croatian War of Independence, the 1991 census recorded a total population of 165,253, composed of 110,934 (67.1%) Croats, 33,146 (20.0%) Serbs, 3,156 (1.9%) Hungarians, 276 (0.16%) Germans, and 17,741 (10.7%) people categorized as Yugoslavs or "others."

According to the census of 2001, the total population of Osijek dropped to 114,616. Croats made up the majority of Osijek's citizens, comprising 86.58% of the city's population. Other ethnicities include 8,767 (7.65%) Serbs, 1,154 (1.01%) Hungarians, 480 (0.42%) Albanians, 211 (0.18%) Bosniaks, 175 (0.15%) Montenegrins, 178 (0.16%) ethnic Macedonians, 124 (0.11%) Romani, and others, including 24 Jews.

Osijek's population in 2001 included 96,600 (84.28%) Roman Catholics, 78 (0.07%) Eastern-rite Catholics, 8,619 (7.52%) Orthodox Christians, and 966 (0.84%) Muslims and others.

In the census of 2011, the following settlements were recorded:

- Brijest, population 1,187
- Briješće, population 1,318
- Josipovac, population 4,101
- Klisa, population 324
- Nemetin, population 139
- Osijek, population 84,104
- Podravlje, population 357
- Sarvaš, population 1,884
- Tenja, population 7,376
- Tvrđavica, population 578
- Višnjevac, population 6,680
City of Osijek: Population trends 1857–2021
v

population	20858	24863	25260	27801	33407	40106	42930	51871	58063	66073	84652	109189	123944	129792	114616	108048	96313
	1857	1869	1880	1890	1900	1910	1921	1931	1948	1953	1961	1971	1981	1991	2001	2011	2021

Sources: Croatian Bureau of Statistics publications

The city's population is divided into the following units of local administration:

- Local board (mjesni odbor):
  - Josipovac
  - Višnjevac
  - Cvjetno
  - Brijest
  - Osijek lijeva obala
  - Tenja
  - Klisa
  - Sarvaš
- City neighbourhood (gradska četvrt):
  - Retfala
  - Gornji grad
  - Industrijska četvrt
  - Tvrđa
  - Novi grad
  - Jug II
  - Donji grad

== Institutions and industries ==
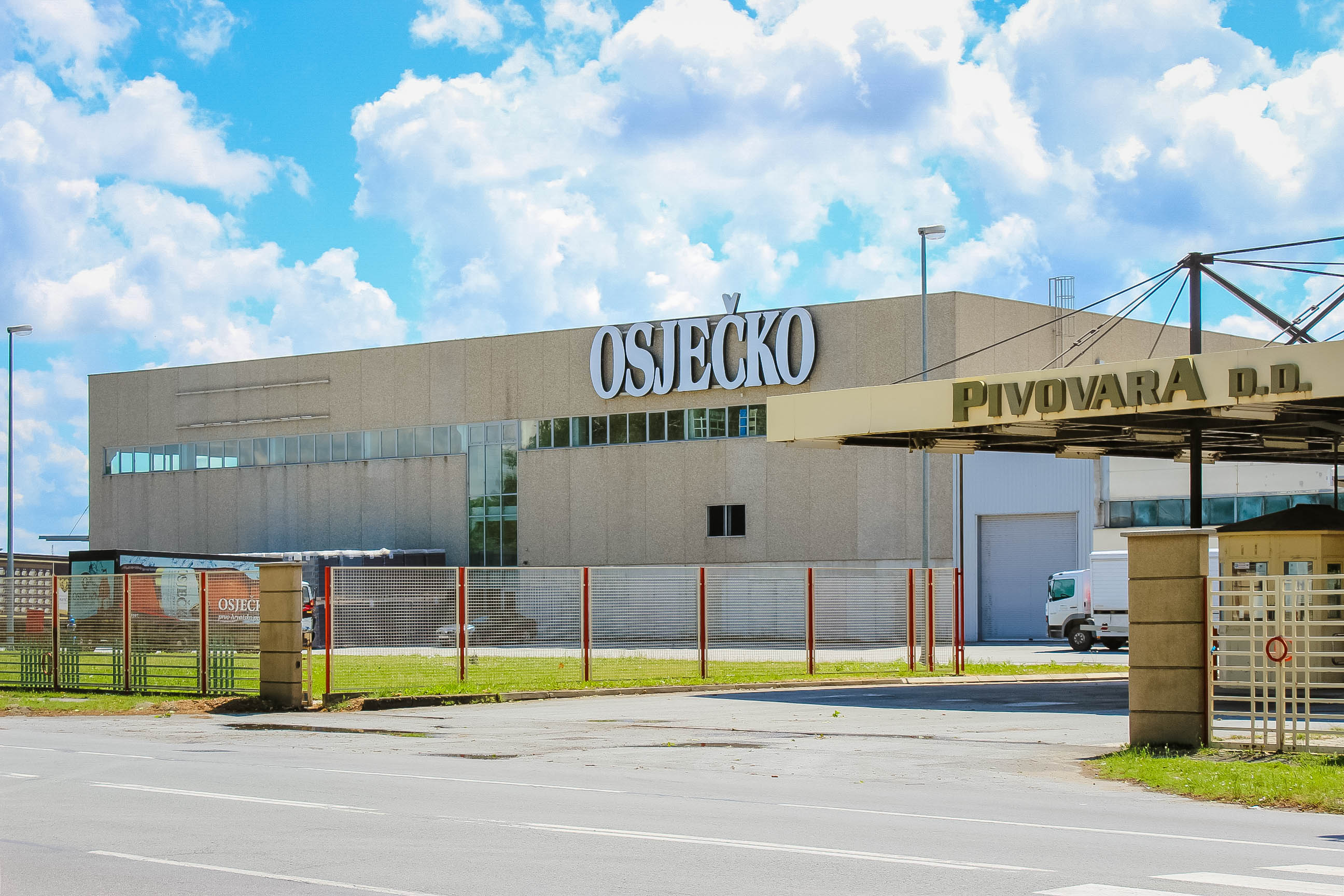
Osječko beer factory

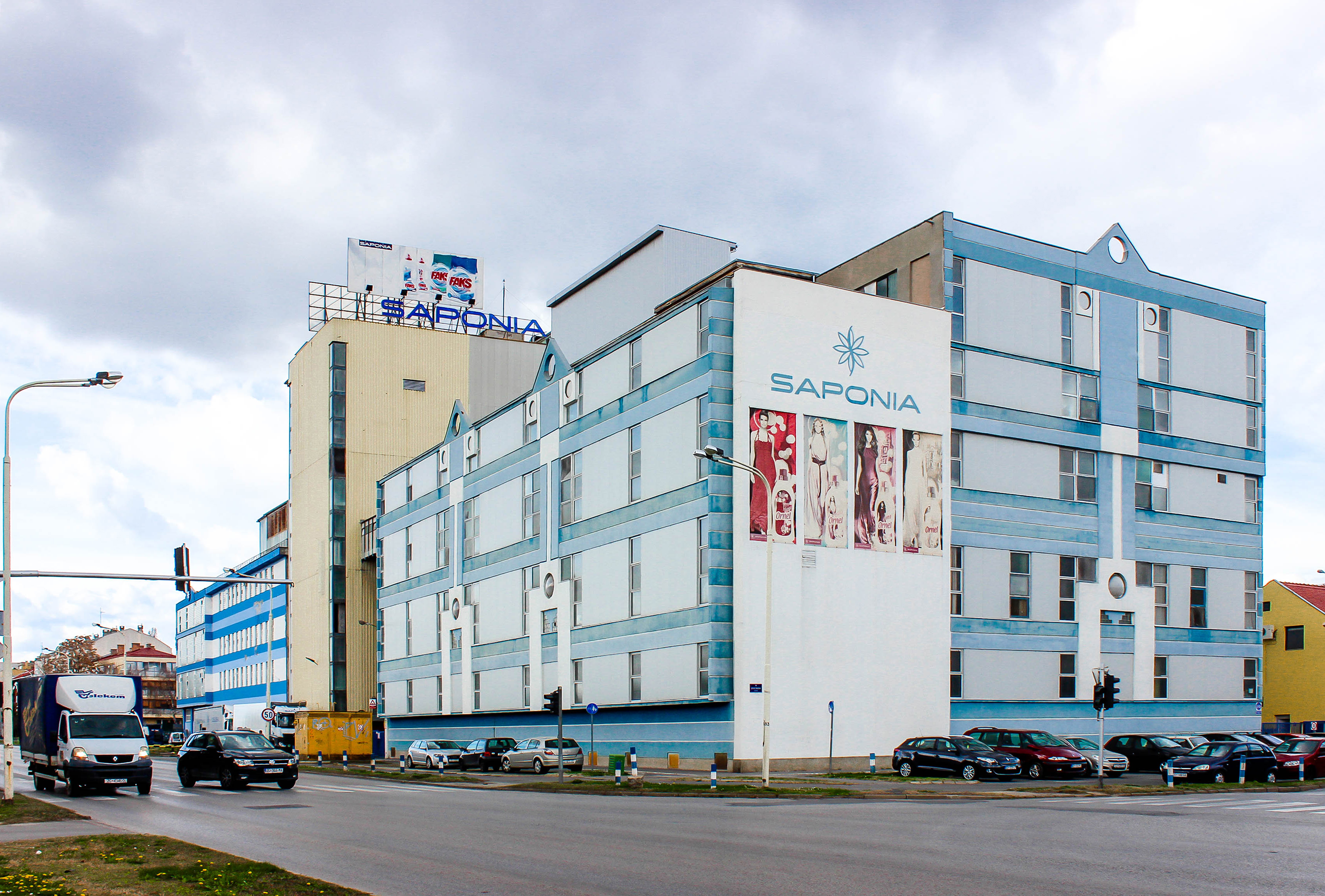
Saponia chemical industry is the largest factory in the Osijek area.

Osijek serves as a major centre for institutions and industries. It hosts the Josip Juraj Strossmayer University of Osijek (established in 1975), the Croatian National Theatre, the Museum of Slavonia (founded in 1877), and a printing house operating since 1735. The city's educational and scientific infrastructure includes several gymnasiums, the oldest of which dates to 1729, a 19th-century drawing school, and a zoological garden. Furthermore, Osijek houses institutes focused on agricultural development, including a centre for livestock breeding and an institute for sugar beet research.

The Saponia chemical factory is the largest industrial plant in the Osijek area and a major regional producer of detergents, soaps, and cosmetics. It serves as the city's primary exporter. Other significant industries include the regional Pivovara Osijek brewery, known for producing the first beer in Croatia, a sugar processing plant, and the Kandit candy factory. The Niveta brush factory, originally founded as "Siva" in 1922, also continues to operate in the city.

The Osijek area was formerly more industrialized, supporting the manufacture of a wide variety of goods. One of the earliest such enterprises was the Drava match factory, established in 1856, which is now defunct.

Other significant industries included the manufacture of synthetic materials, agricultural machinery, metal furniture, textiles, footwear, silk, and wood and timber products, in addition to metal processing and printing. However, the 1990s saw most of these sectors experience a severe decline, with many enterprises closing completely. Despite this industrial transition, Osijek continues to serve as the central hub for an important agricultural region.

== Politics ==
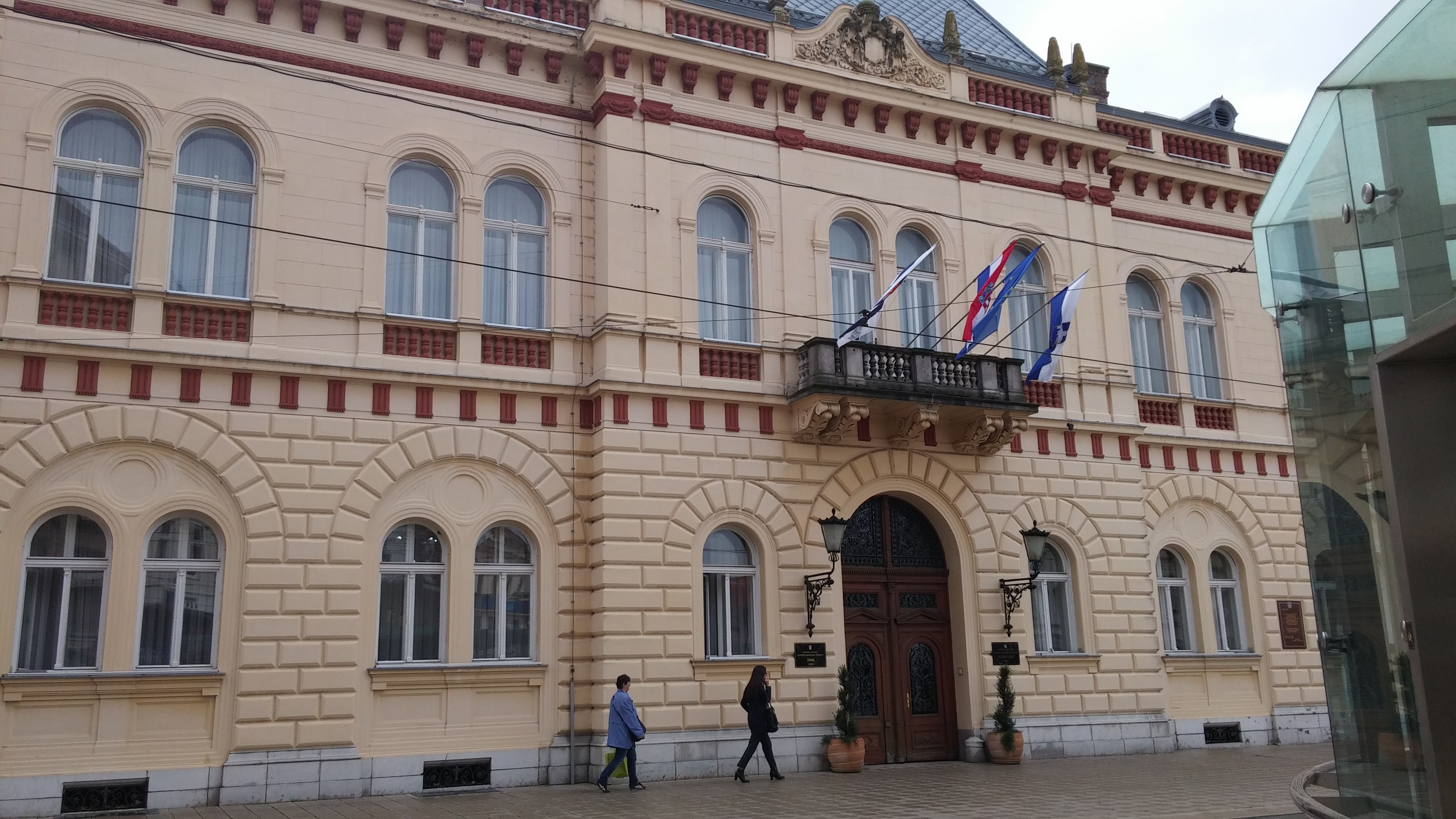
Normann Palace, today seat of the government of the Osijek-Baranja County

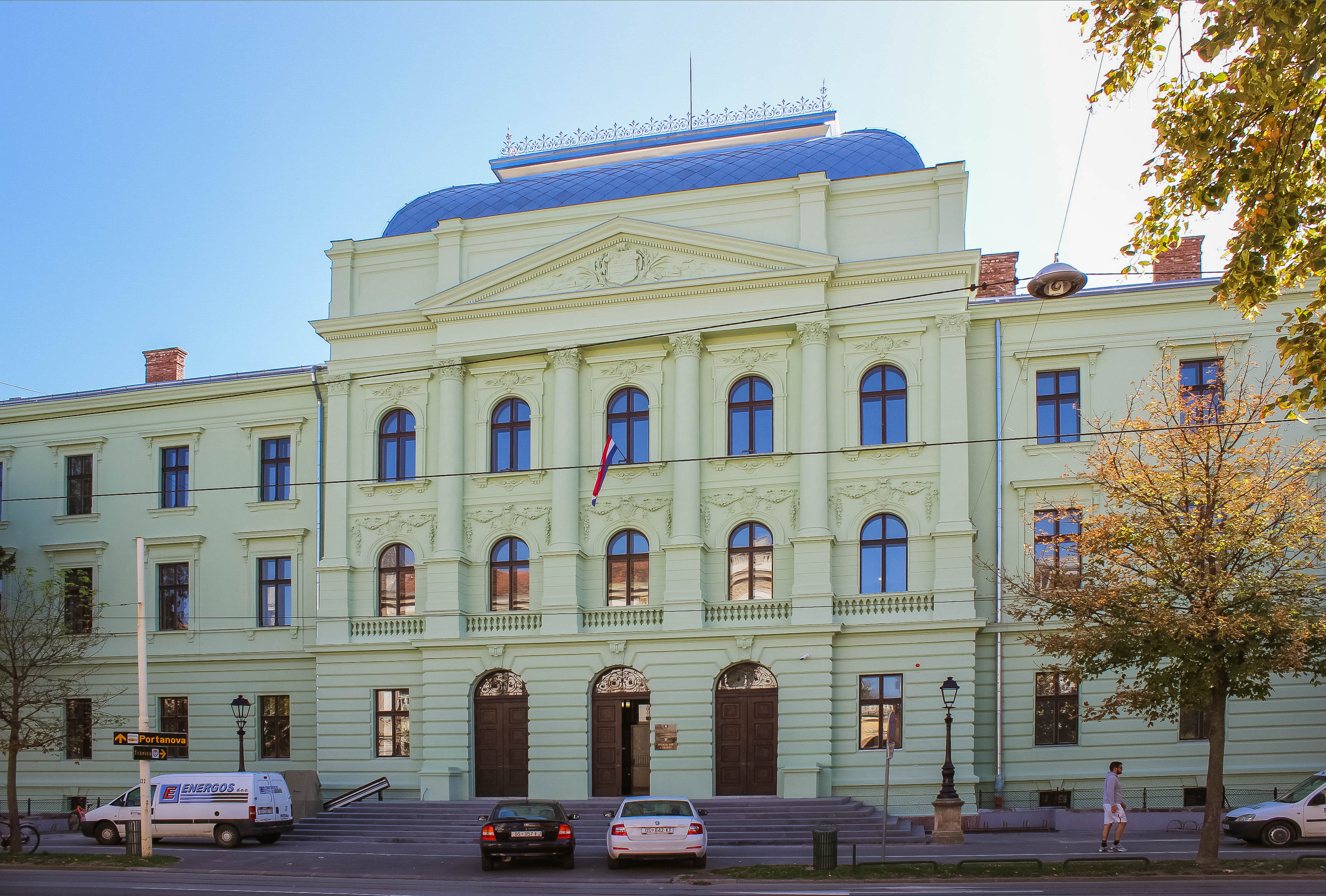
Osijek Municipal and County Court

In the November 2007 elections, no party held a majority, which is customary for Croatia, as local elections have proportional representation. However, the three mathematically possible coalitions faced political issues that made coalition-building difficult. The November elections were early elections caused by the breakdown of the coalition of the two main parties, the Croatian Party of Rights (HSP) and the Croatian Democratic Assembly of Slavonia and Baranja (HDSSB). The cause of the breakdown was disagreement over the building of a new sports stadium.

At the elections held on 25 November 2007, the HSP and the HDSSB gained seven seats each, the Social Democratic Party (SDP) six seats, the Croatian Democratic Union (HDZ) four, and the Croatian People's Party – Liberal Democrats (HNS) one.

A possible coalition between HDSSB and SDP provoked criticism of the Social Democrats for lack of principle, including from Damir Kajin, who called it a "sellotape coalition," alluding to the charges of war crimes that the HDSSB leader Branimir Glavaš is facing. After the parties failed to agree on a coalition, the Croatian government called new elections for the city. These elections took place on 9 March 2008 and gave the HSP nine councilors, the HDSSB six, HDZ five, SDP three and a coalition of HNS and two smaller parties two. Anto Đapić has expressed his hope for a coalition with the HDZ.

=== Minority councils ===
Directly elected minority councils and representatives are tasked with consulting tasks for the local or regional authorities in which they are advocating for minority rights and interests, integration into public life and participation in the management of local affairs. At the 2023 Croatian national minorities councils and representatives elections Albanians, Hungarians, Germans, Slovaks and Serbs of Croatia each fulfilled legal requirements to elect 15 members minority councils for the City of Osijek while Bosniaks, Macedonians, Montenegrins of Croatia elected individual representatives.

== Society and culture ==
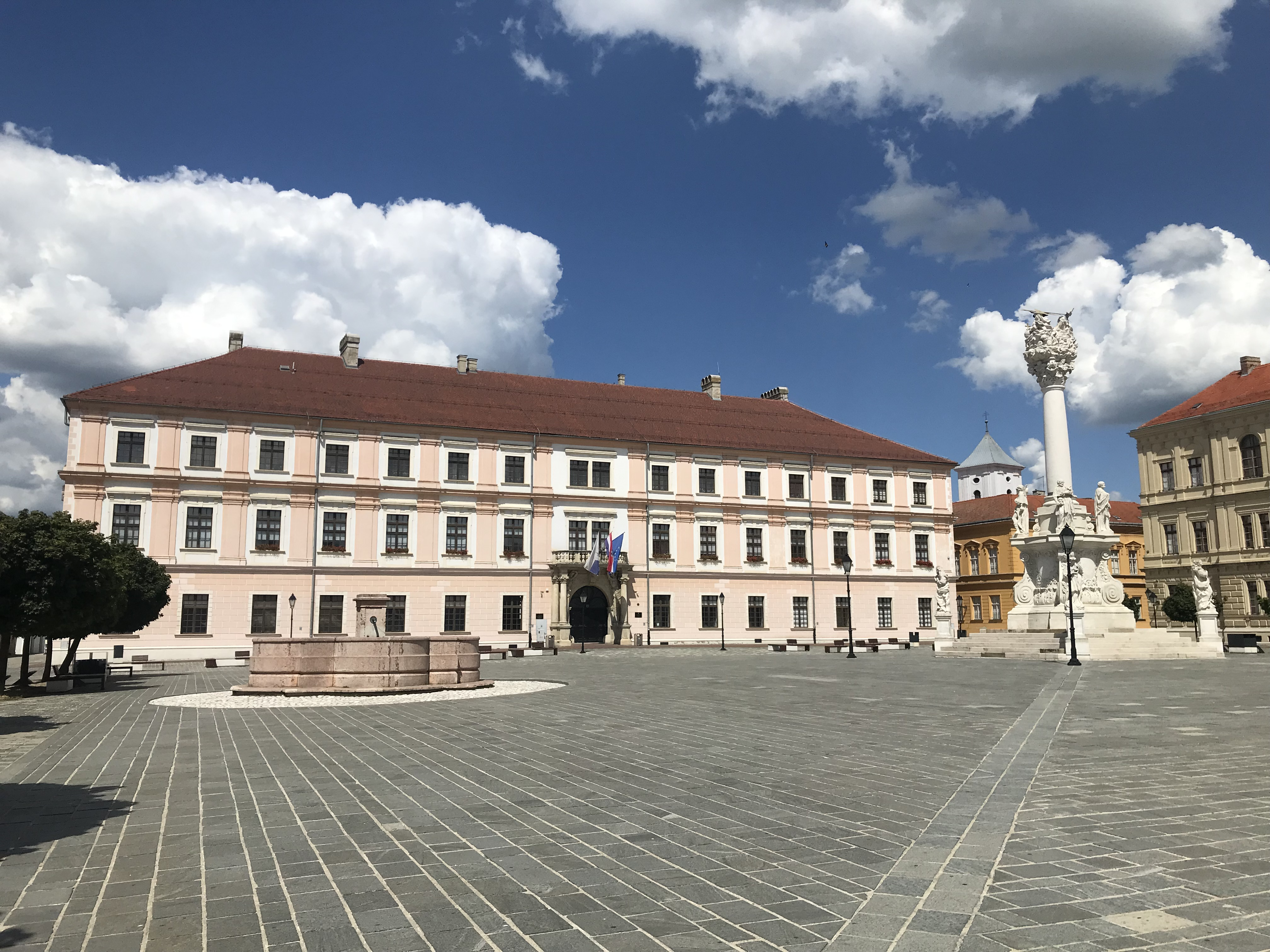
Palace of Slavonian General Command

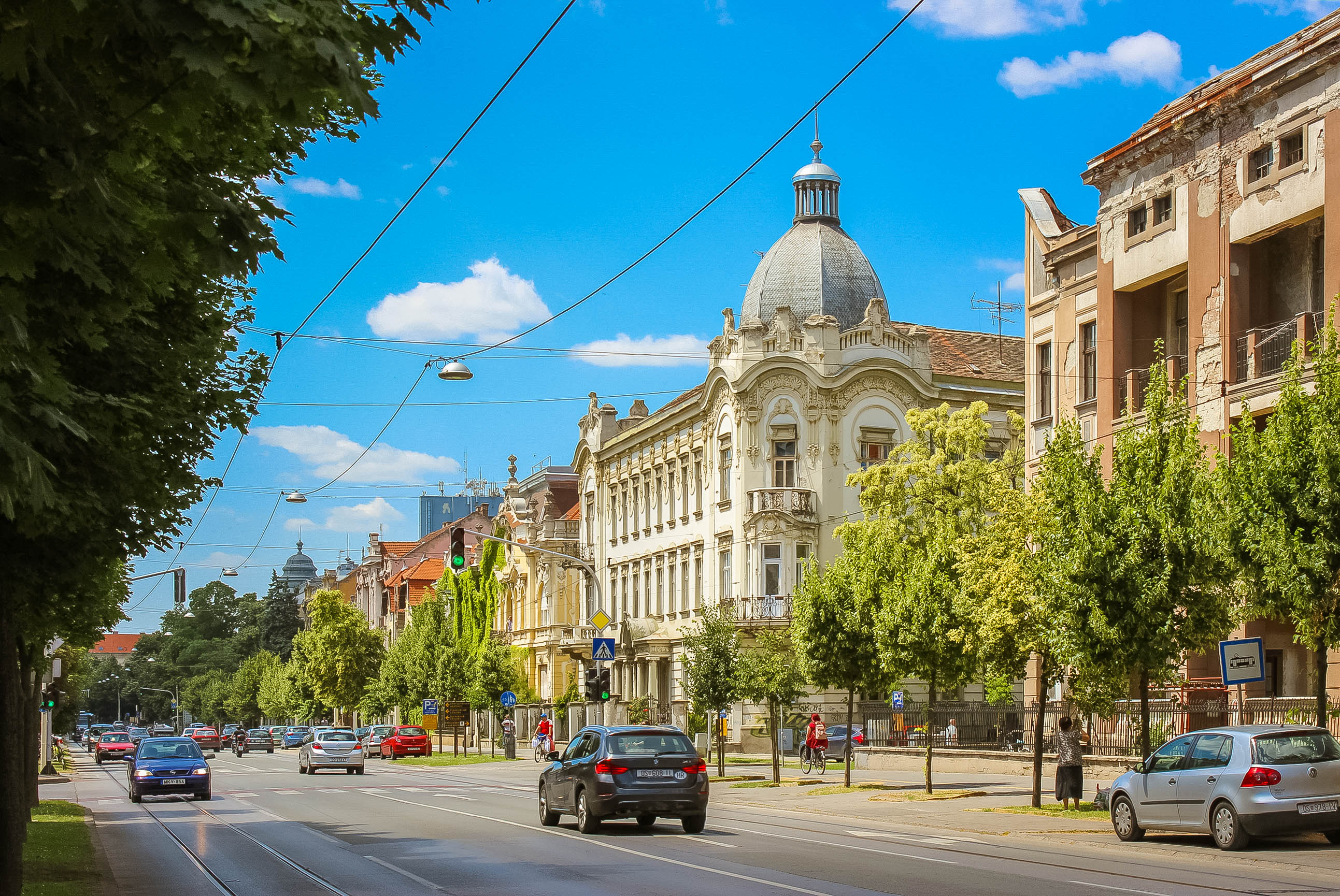
European Avenue.

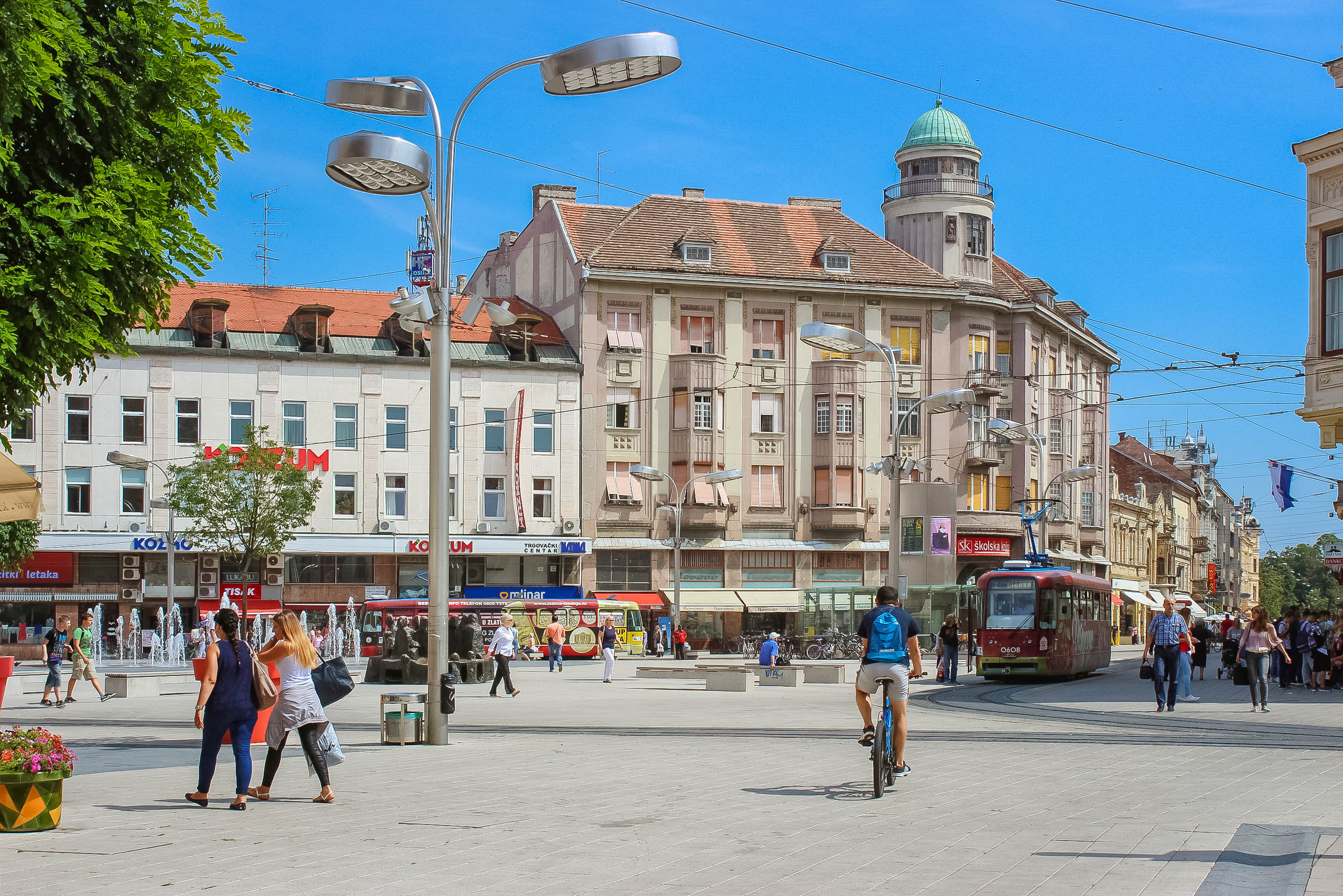
Ante Starčević Square, Osijek's main city square

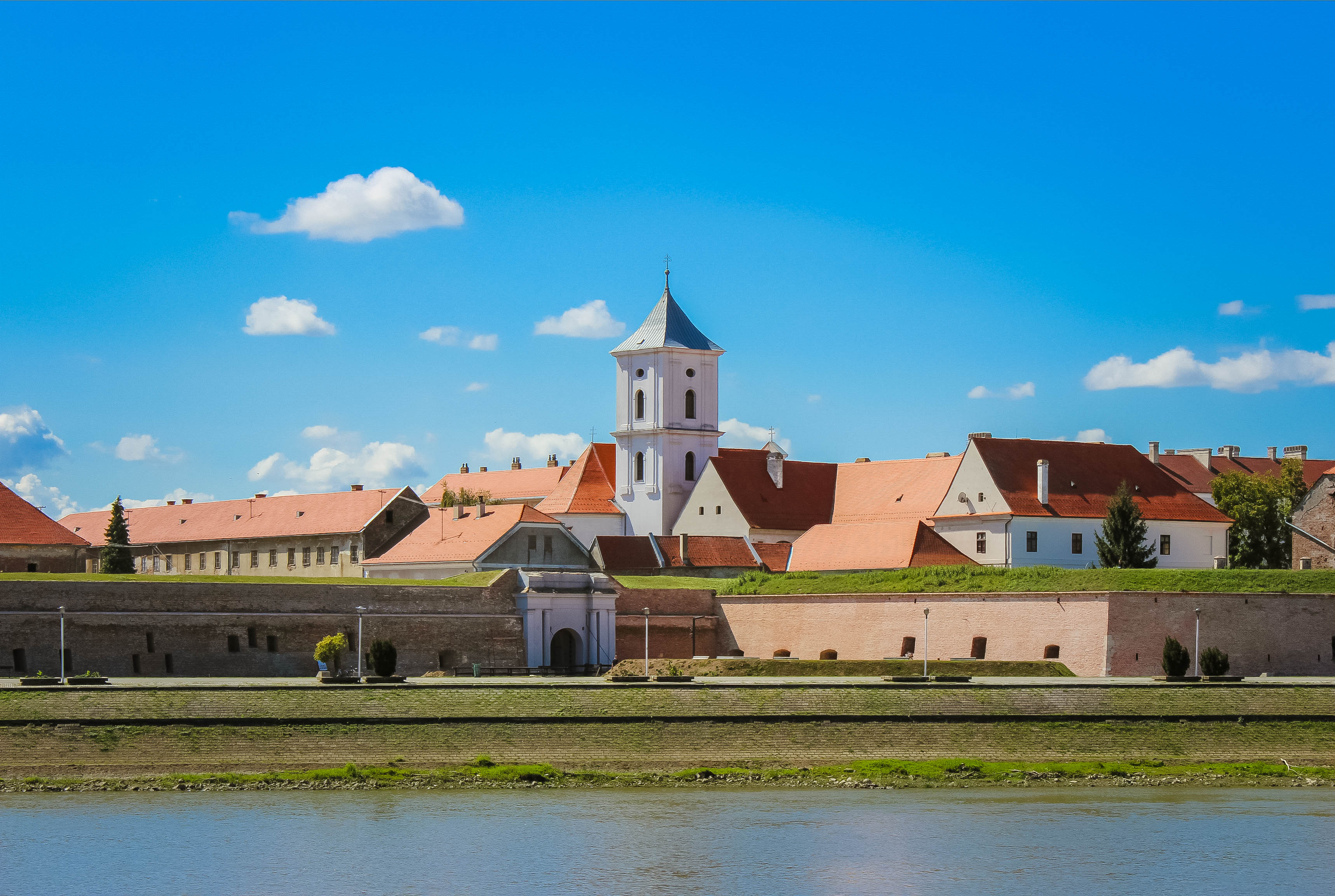
Tvrđa

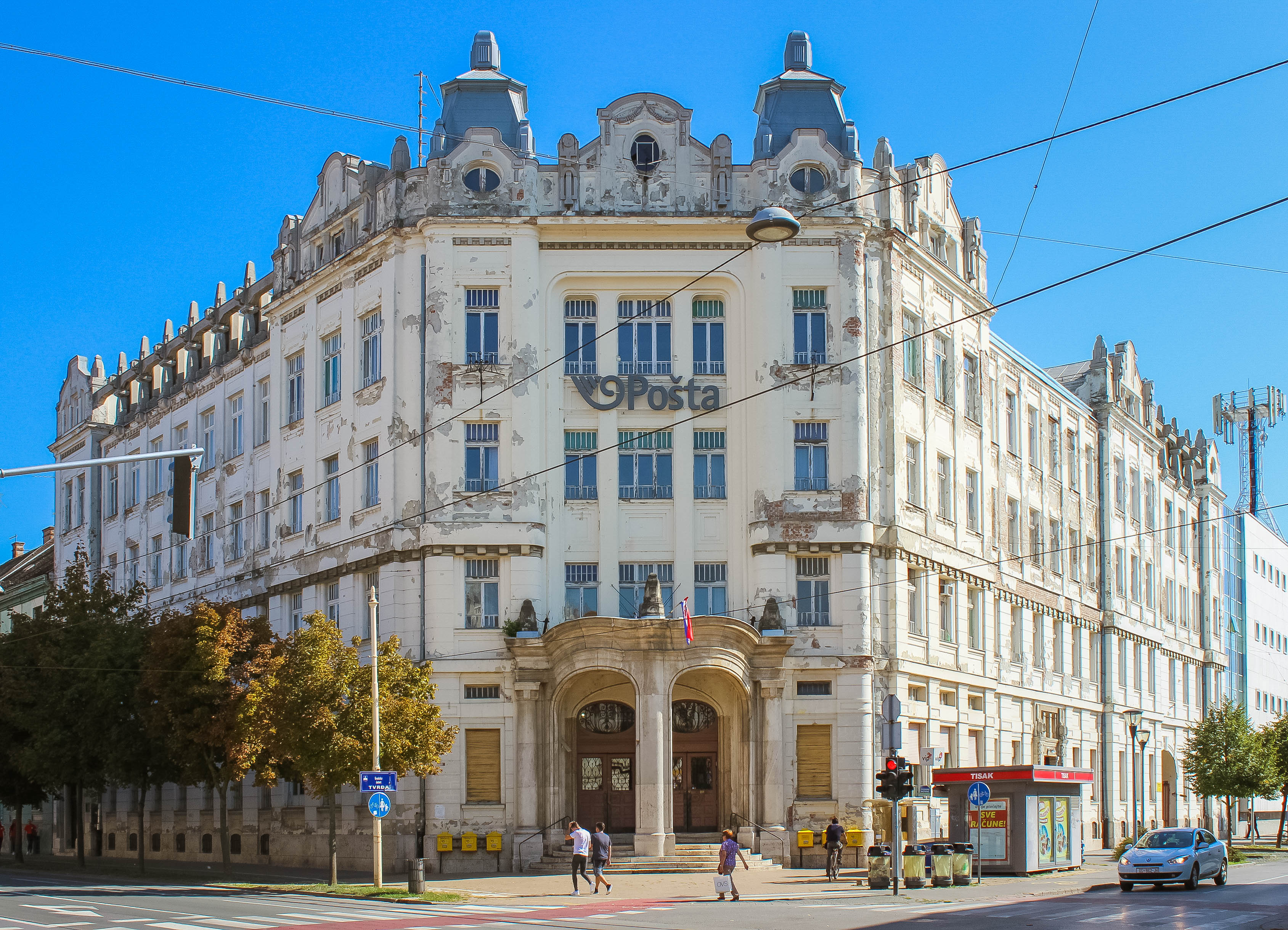
Osijek Main Post Office Building

=== Cultural events ===
Numerous cultural events take place in Osijek throughout the year. The long-running International Festival of Tambura Music (Međunarodni festival umjetničke tamburaške glazbe) is held annually in late spring and draws tambura ensembles from across Croatia and the region.

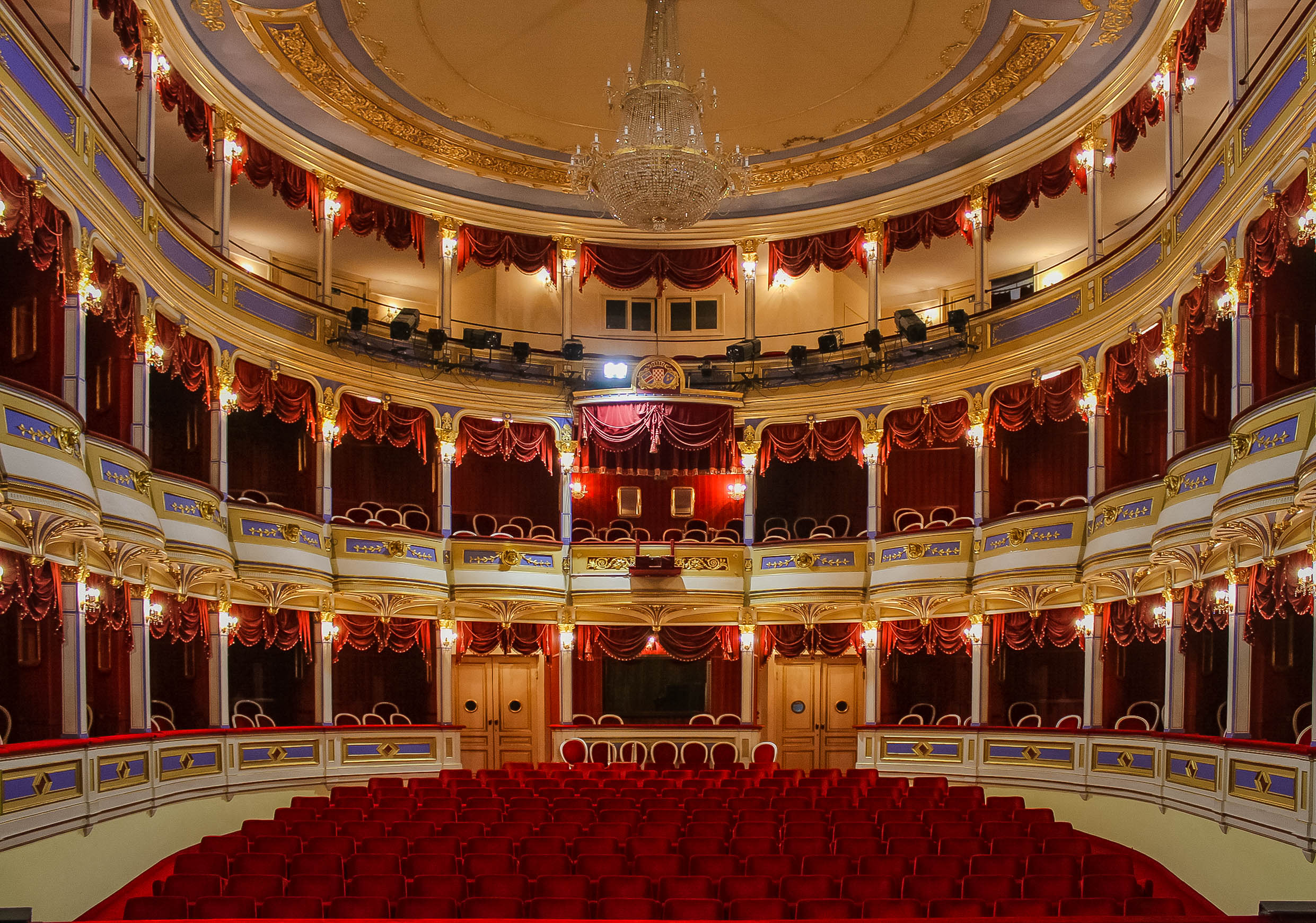
Croatian National Theatre, Osijek, interior.

During the summer months, the city hosts "Osijek Summer Nights" (Osječke ljetne večeri), a series of open-air cultural and entertainment events held on streets and promenades from June to August. The Day of the City of Osijek (Dan grada Osijeka), celebrated on 2 December, is marked by cultural and artistic programmes and public events.

The surrounding area, particularly the Kopački Rit nature park in Baranja, provides opportunities for guided boat tours, angling, and regulated hunting in designated zones, making it a popular destination for nature tourism and recreational fishing.

=== Cuisine ===
The richness of local game and agricultural production has contributed to Osijek's reputation as a centre of Croatian gastronomy. Local dishes include traditional Slavonian-style specialities such as kulen (paprika-flavoured sausage), various other sausages, ham, bacon, and dairy products. Other notable dishes are boiled dumplings, venison, čobanac (a spicy stew), and fish dishes such as fiš paprikaš (a paprika-based fish stew). The city's two locally brewed beer brands are Osječko and Esseker.

=== Sport and recreation ===
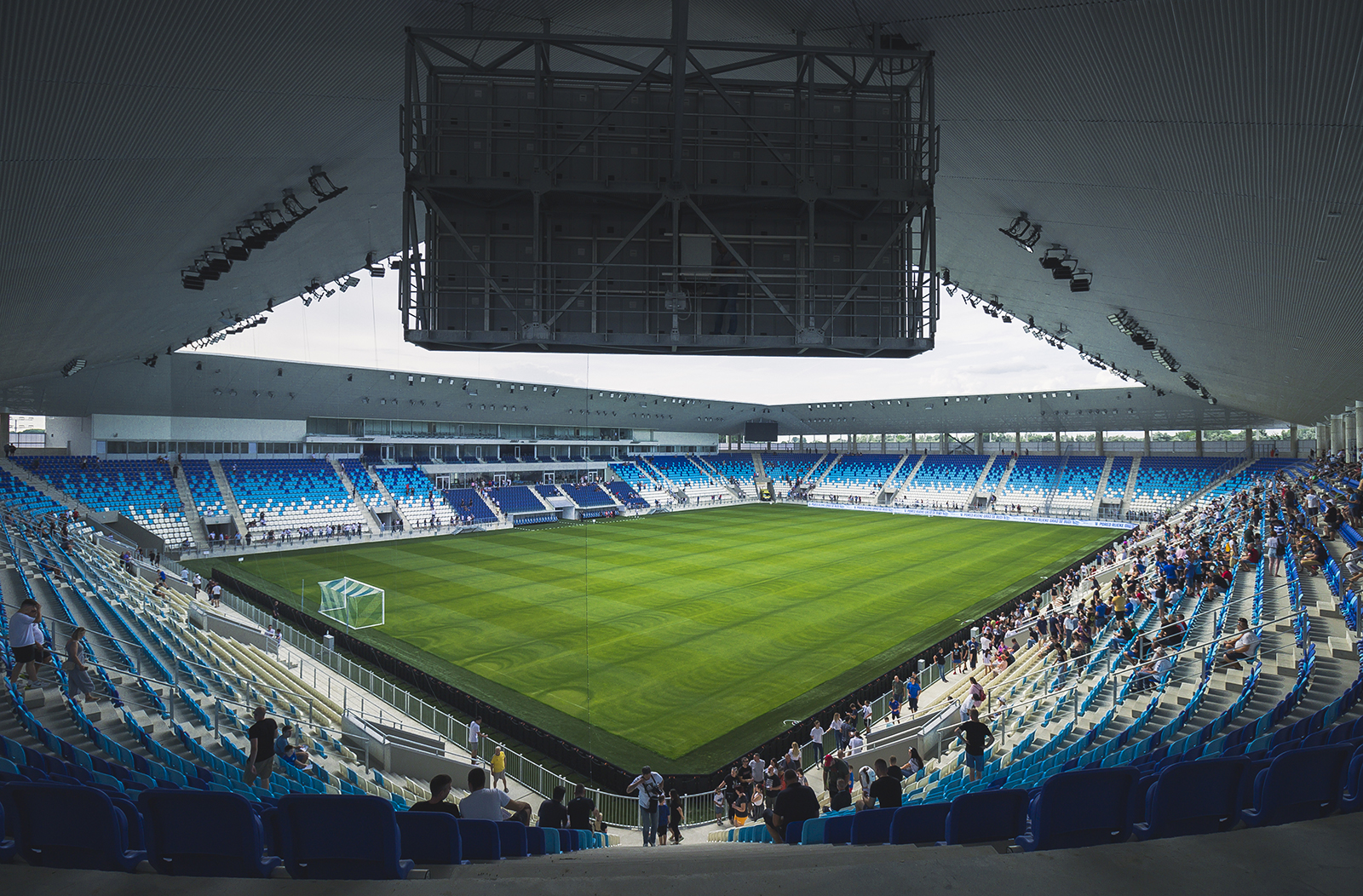
Opus Arena

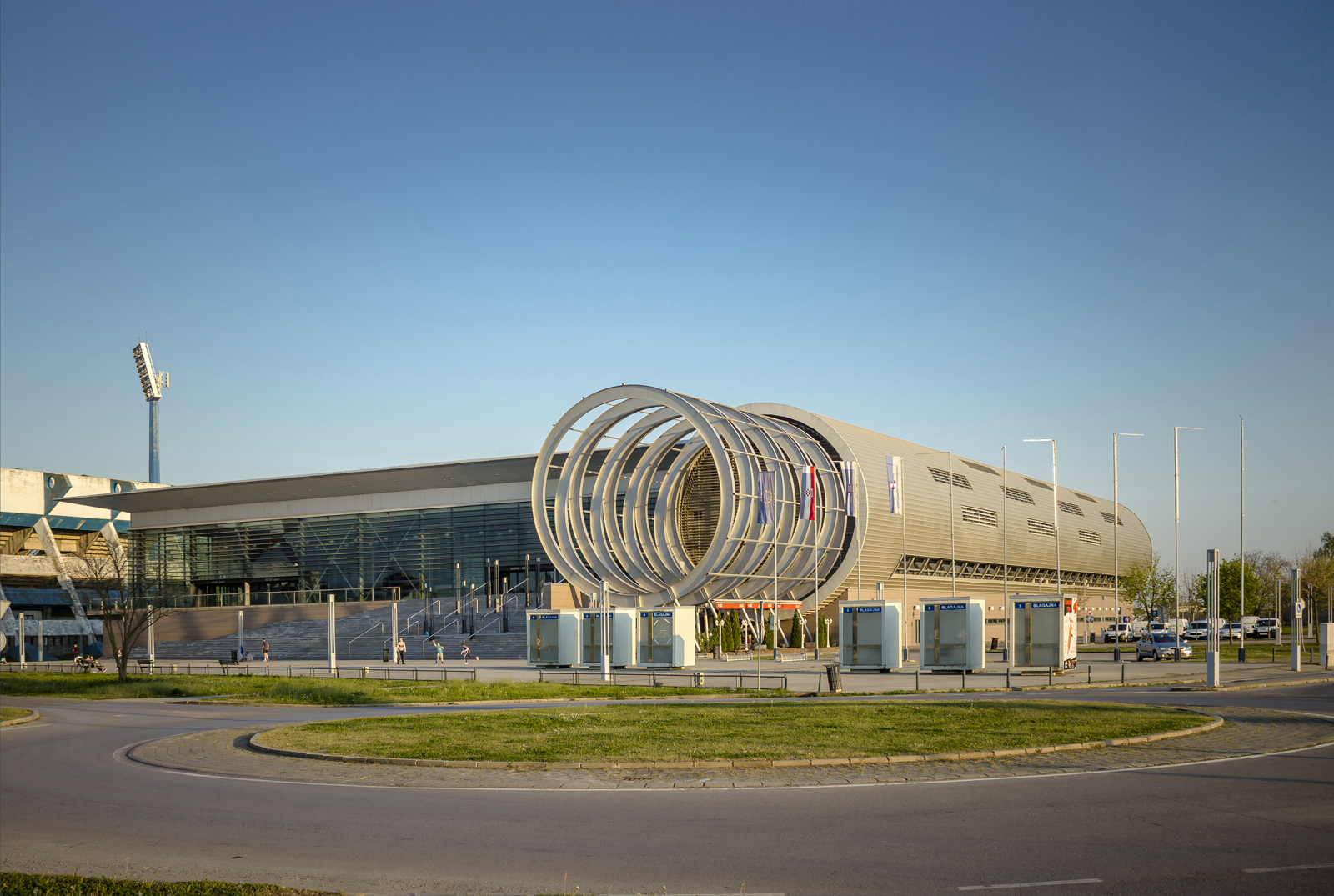
Gradski vrt Hall

The Gradski vrt sports complex features the Gradski vrt Hall (Dvorana Gradski vrt), a multi-purpose arena built for the 2009 World Men's Handball Championship which has since hosted major events like the 2017 Davis Cup tie between Croatia and Spain. The city annually hosts the Pannonian Challenge, an internationally recognized extreme sports festival for skateboarding, BMX, and inline skating. The new Opus Arena, the home stadium of NK Osijek with a capacity of 13,005, was officially opened on 22 July 2023.

The Copacabana recreational and sports centre, opened in 1980 on the left bank of the Drava River, provides facilities for various water sports during the summer months, including outdoor swimming pools and a sandy beach. The city maintains numerous outdoor playgrounds and courts for football, handball, basketball, and tennis. NK Osijek is the city's primary football club, competing in the First League. The team's organized supporters are known as the Kohorta Osijek. Before the Second World War, the city's most successful club was Slavija Osijek, which was dissolved in 1941.

A motorcycle speedway stadium was formerly located in the City Garden (Gradski vrt) area, on its north side. The Gradski stadion opened in October 1953 and closed in September 1987. During its operation, it hosted a qualifying round of the Speedway World Championship in 1955, 1979, and 1982, as well as a round of the 1977 Speedway World Cup.

The Dvorana Gradski vrt, a multi-purpose sports hall, was constructed as a venue for the 2009 World Men's Handball Championship. It later hosted the 2017 Davis Cup World Group match between Croatia and Spain. Additionally, Osijek is the home of the annual Pannonian Challenge, an extreme sports festival that features competitions in skateboarding, inline skating, freestyle BMX, and MTB dirt racing.

The new Opus Arena stadium, with a capacity of 13,005 spectators, was opened on 22 July 2023 with the official match of the first round of the Croatian First League between the NK Osijek and NK Slaven Belupo.

=== Tourism, sights and attractions ===
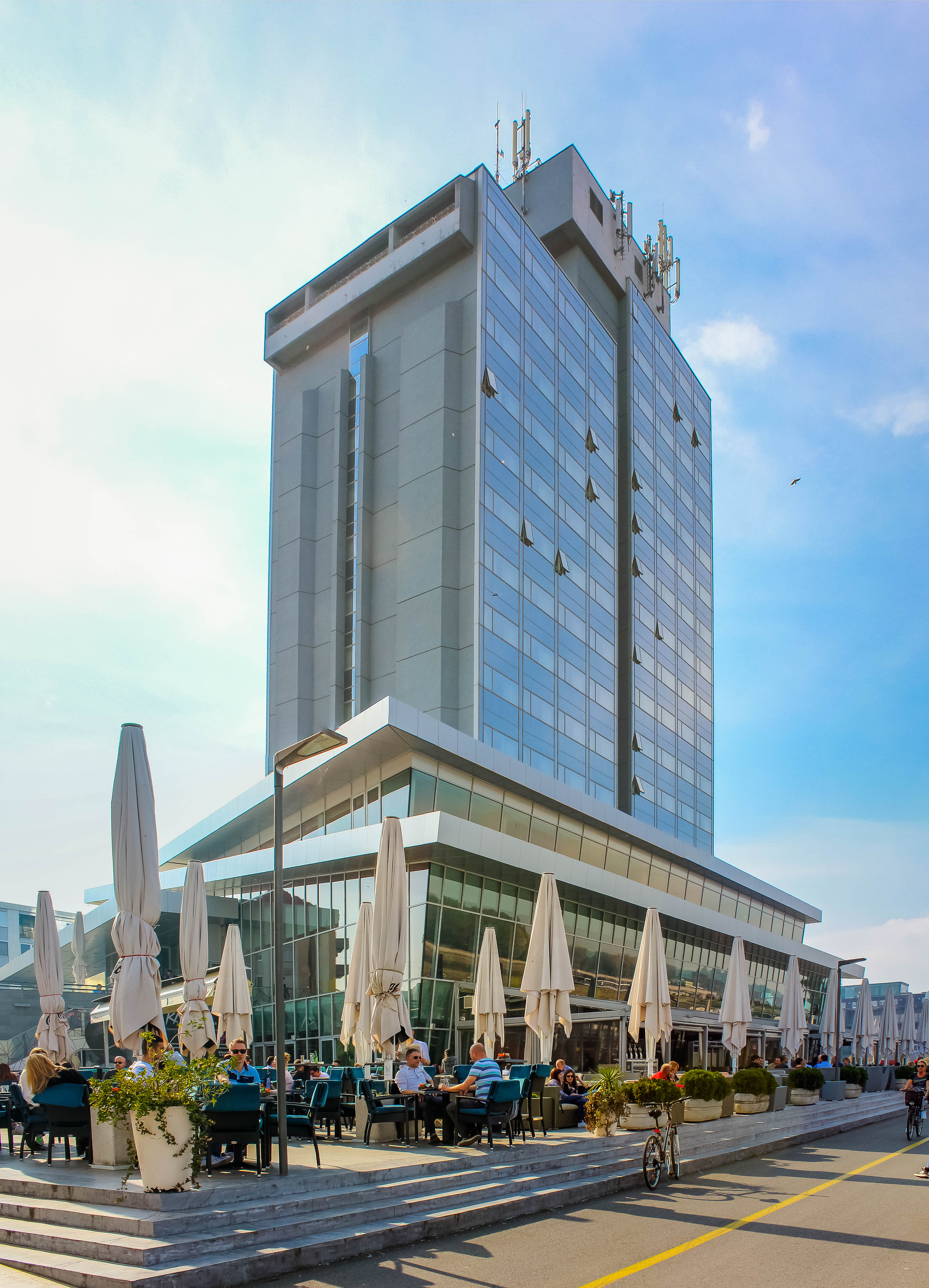
Hotel Osijek

Osijek remains a popular domestic tourist destination, known for its Baroque architecture, expansive open spaces, and diverse recreational offerings. Key attractions include the main Ante Starčević Square, the 18th-century Baroque citadel of Tvrđa, the scenic promenade along the Drava River (promenada), and the pedestrian suspension bridge connecting the city to Baranja.

The Municipal Park of King Petar Krešimir IV and Tomislav Park, both established in the early 20th century, are protected as national cultural landmarks. The city contains one of Croatia's few zoological gardens, located along the Drava river. A notable monument in the city honors Croatian political figure Ante Starčević.

The Co-cathedral of St. Peter and Paul in Osijek is a Neo-Gothic structure designed by German architect Franz Langenberg, with contributions from Richard Jordan. Its tower, rising to 90 meters, is the second-highest church tower in Croatia. Although its size and prominence often lead to it being called a cathedral, it served as a parish church until its elevation to a co-cathedral in 2008. The interior contains approximately 40 stained-glass windows, with the main altar and sculptures crafted by Eduard Hauser. The building sustained significant damage during the Croatian War of Independence in the 1990s, resulting in the loss of some original features.

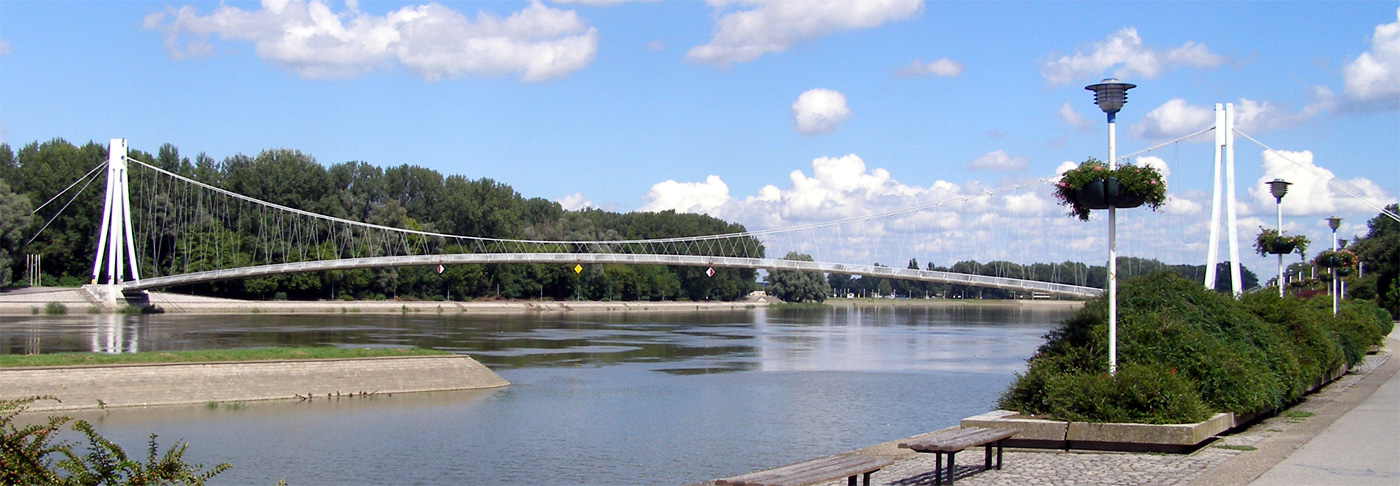
A panoramic view of the pedestrian bridge over the Drava.

=== Festivals and Events ===
Osijek has become home to several large festivals and events, including Urban Fest Osijek, an annual music festival, and Pannonian Challenge, an annual extreme sports festival.

== Transport ==
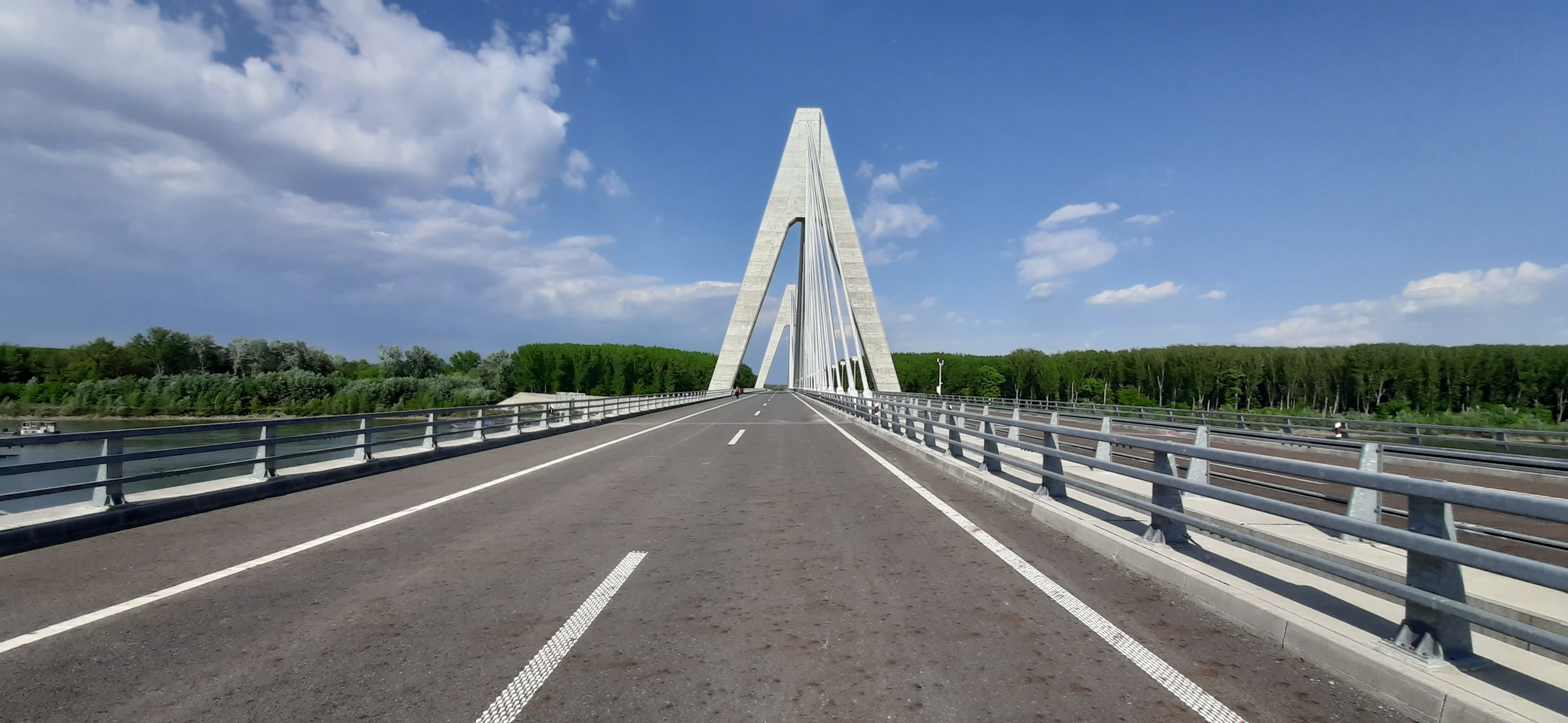
Osijek cable-stayed Drava Highway Bridge, the longest bridge in Croatia. (81 metres longer than the Pelješac bridge)

Transport links to and from Osijek include major railway and highway junctions, a river port, and Osijek Airport. International flights from the airport to Cologne/Bonn Airport in Germany commenced in March 2008. A four-lane highway, part of the Pan-European Corridor Vc, linking Osijek to the rest of the Croatian modern highway network, was completed and opened in April 2009. From Osijek, it is possible to take the train or bus to numerous destinations including, Zagreb, Rijeka, Požega, Virovitica, Našice, Slavonski Brod, Erdut, Vrpolje, Dalj, and Đakovo.

A small tram network runs through the city, which has been in continuous operation since 1884, and is the only tram network still in operation in Croatia outside of Zagreb. The network is currently being completely overhauled and more than doubled in length, and the city's old trams have been thoroughly modernized.

== Notable people ==
Notable people who were born or have lived in Osijek include:

- Matija Petar Katančić, an 18th-century Croatian writer, professor of archaeology, translator of the Bible into Croatian, and author of the first paper on archaeology in Croatia.
- Josip Juraj Strossmayer, a Croatian Maecenas bishop.
- Franjo Šeper, Archbishop of Zagreb from 1960 to 1968, and Prefect of the Congregation for the Doctrine of the Faith from 1968 to 1981.
- Francis, Duke of Teck, a German prince
- Oscar Nemon, sculptor
- Adolf Waldinger, painter
- Bela Čikoš Sesija, painter
- Franjo Kuhač, musicologist
- Franjo Krežma, violinist
- Heda Piliš, composer
- Miroslav Škoro, singer and former politician
- Branko Mihaljević, singer
- Krunoslav Slabinac, singer
- Ferdo Šišić, historian
- Snježana Kordić, linguist
- Drago Hedl, investigative journalist and writer
- Vladimir Herzog, TV journalist
- Branko Lustig, Hollywood producer, Academy Award winner for Schindler's List and Gladiator, directed by Steven Spielberg and Ridley Scott, respectively.
- Davor Šuker, footballer
- Franjo Glaser footballer
- Borna Barišić, footballer
- Jasna Šekarić, sport shooter
- Jelena Dokić, tennis player
- Donna Vekić, tennis player
- Lavoslav (Leopold) Ružička, winner of a 1939 Nobel Prize in Chemistry
- Vladimir Prelog, winner of a 1975 Nobel Prize in Chemistry
- Andrija Mohorovičić, meteorologist and seismologist
- Milutin Milanković, mathematician and climatologist
- Mijo Kišoatić, famous Croatian mineralogist and petrologist, first doctor of science (Ph.D.) in the field of natural sciences at the University of Zagreb.
- Ante Vukasović, Pedagogue and university professor
- Mia Dimšić, singer

== Acknowledgements ==
=== Honorary citizens ===
- 1994: Siegbert Frank, Ćiril Kos, Vladimir Prelog
- 1995: Hans Dietrich Genscher, Bernard M. Luketich
- 1996: Geza Jeszenszky, Alois Mock
- 2001: Julije Knifer
- 2004: Branko Lustig
- 2008: Davor Šuker
- 2012: Ante Gotovina, Mladen Markač
- 2013: Jacques Paul Klein, Ive Mažuran
- 2016: Vladimir Šeks
- 2020: Lőrinc Mészáros

== International relations ==
=== Twin towns – sister cities ===
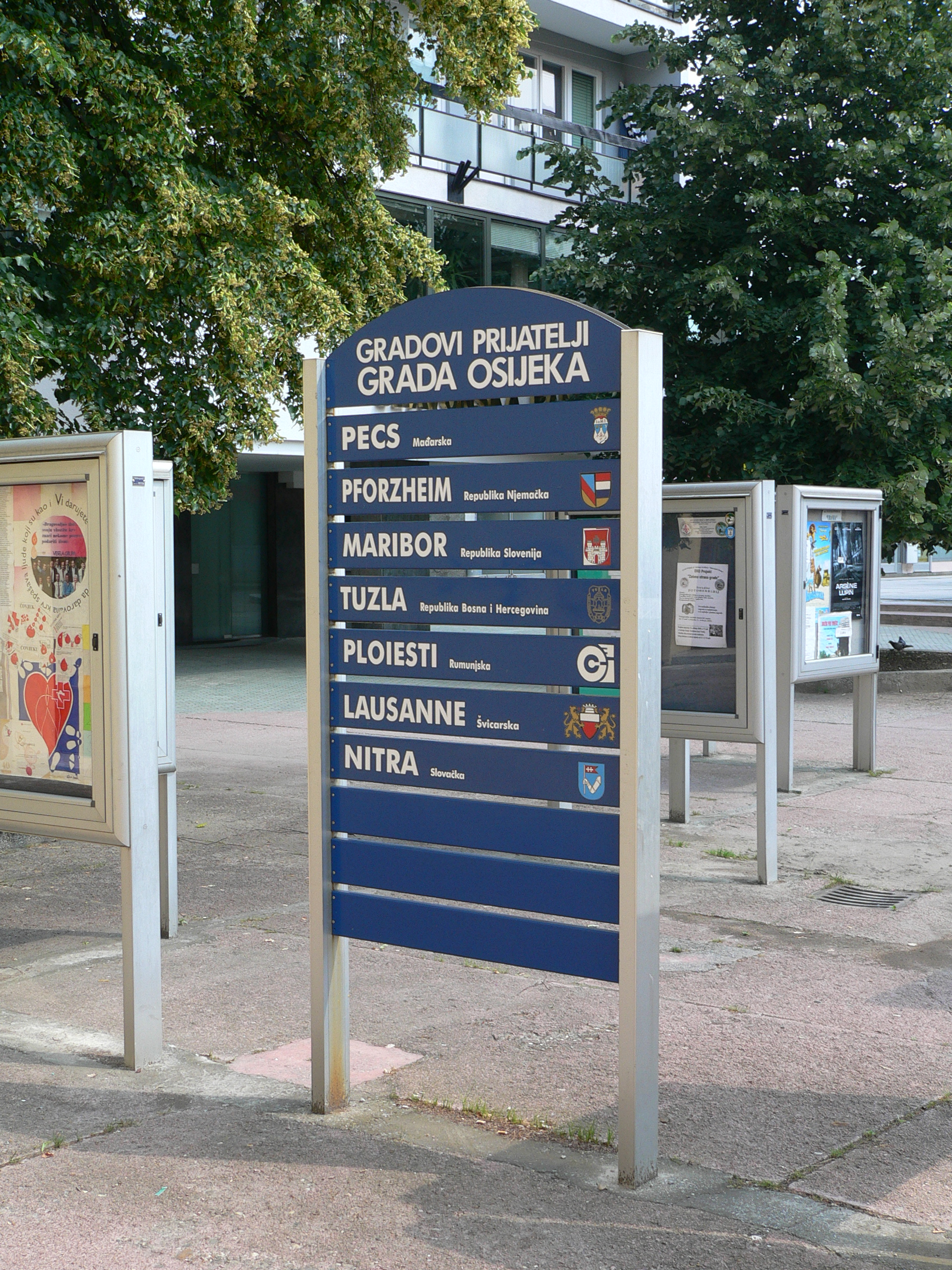
Twin towns sign

Osijek is twinned with:

Budapest XIII, Hungary (2001); Canada Bay, Australia (2018); Elbasan, Albania (2015); Huanggang, China (2017); Lausanne, Switzerland (1997); Maribor, Slovenia (1995); Mostar, Bosnia and Herzegovina (2022)	Nitra, Slovakia (1997); Pécs, Hungary (1972); Pforzheim, Germany (1994); Ploiești, Romania (1996); Prizren, Kosovo (2010); Subotica, Serbia (2004); Tuzla, Bosnia and Herzegovina (1996); Vicenza, Italy (2014); Afyonkarahisar, Turkey (2025)

== Demographics ==
=== Ethnic composition (2021) ===
Ethnic group	Population	Percentage
Croats	88,391	91.77%
Serbs	4,188	4.35%
Hungarians (Mađari)	759	0.79%
Albanians	353	0.37%
Germans (Nijemci)	221	0.23%
Slovaks	207	0.21%
Macedonians	139	0.14%
Slovenes	69	0.07%
Roma	77	0.08%
Poles (Poljaci)	12	0.01%
Romanians	16	0.02%
Austrians	16	0.02%
Russians	9	0.01%
Other	1,863	1.93%
Total (Grad Osijek)	96,313	100.00%

=== Partner cities ===
- Novi Sad, Serbia (2002)
