= Brijest =

- Village (Selo)
- Location within Osijek-Baranja County Location within Croatia
- Coordinates: 45°31′14″N 18°40′29″E
- Country: Croatia
- County: Osijek-Baranja
- City: Osijek

Area
  - Total: 1.0 km^{2} (0.39 sq mi)
- Elevation: 89 m (292 ft)

Population (2021)
  - Total: 1,005
  - Density: 1,000/km^{2} (2,600/sq mi)
- Time zone: UTC+1 (CET)
  - Summer (DST): UTC+2 (CEST)
- Postal code: 31000 Osijek
- Area code: 031
- Vehicle registration: OS

Brijest is a village in Osijek-Baranja County, Croatia. It is part of the City of Osijek.
