= Gornji Grad, Osijek =

City district in Osijek, Croatia

Coordinates: 45.561°N 18.670°E

Gornji Grad
- City district of Osijek
- Gradska četvrt Gornji grad Gornji Grad City District
- Interactive map of Gornji Grad
- Country: Croatia
- City: Osijek
- Formation: 1732
- Unification with Donji grad and Tvrđa: 2 December 1786

Government
  - President of Council: Rudika Gmajnić (HDSSB)

Population (2001)
  - Total: 16,520

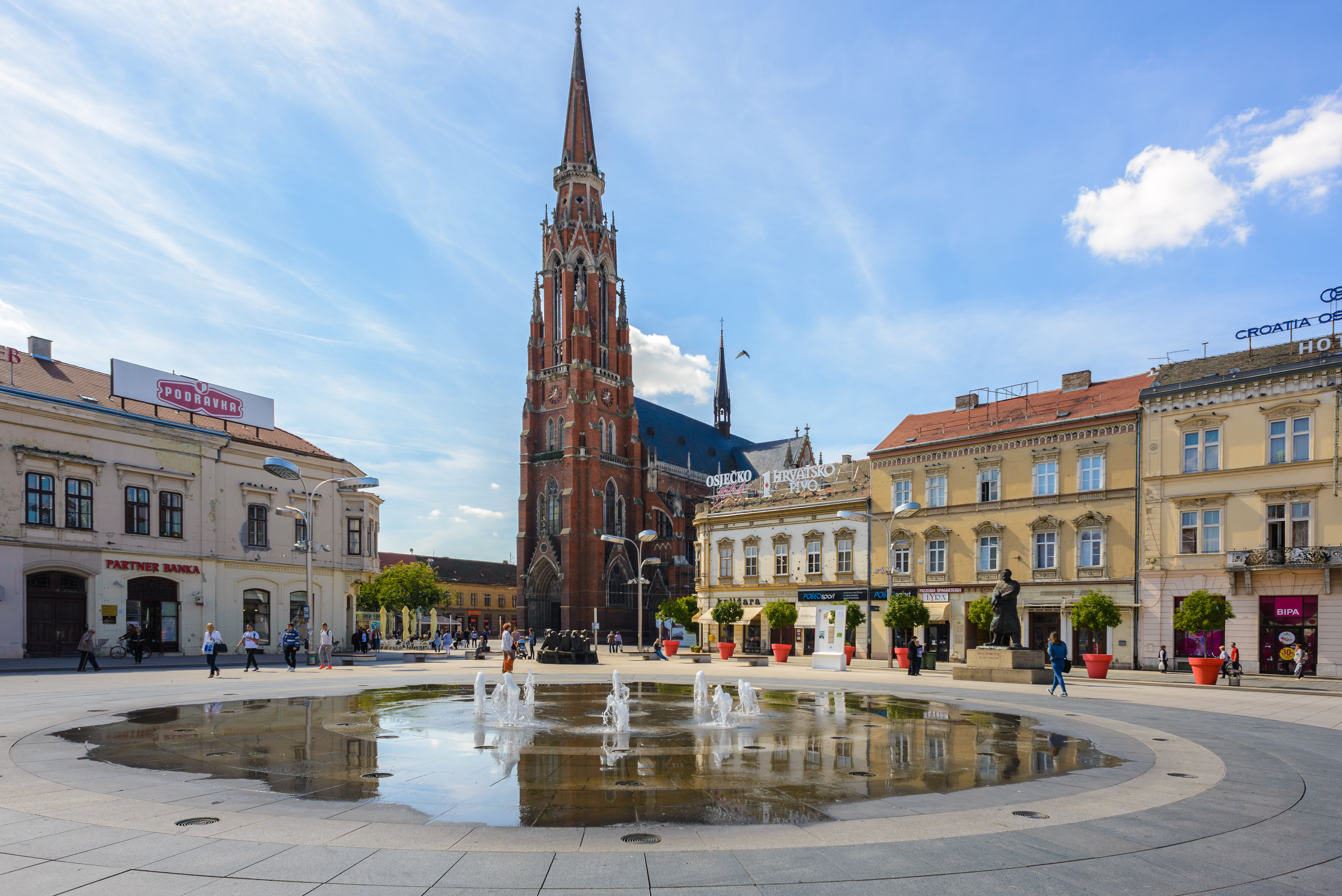

Gornji Grad ("Upper Town") is a city district in the center of Osijek, Croatia. It has 16,520 inhabitants distributed in 6,210 households. It is the biggest and the most important district of Osijek. The most famous attractions of Osijek are located in Gornji Grad, such as Co-cathedral, Ante Starčević Square, Croatian National Theatre, County palace and Pedestrian bridge.

Day of the city district is on 29 June, on feast of Saint Peter and Paul.

== History ==
Gornji Grad has been built urbanistic systematic and properly.

In 1732 it was built church of Saint Peter and Paul, on whose place will be later erected today co-cathedral.

Some streets, such as European Avenue, Županijska, Jägerova, Sunčana, Zrinjevac, Kačićeva, Radićeva, Kapucinska, Neumannova, Stepinčeva and Reisnerova Street have been built between 1866 and 1910.

From 1894 to 1898 the new, bigger church of Saint Peter and Paul was built, which is today Osijek co-cathedral and one of the most notable symbols of Osijek.
