= University of Osijek =

Public university in Osijek, Croatia

Josip Juraj Strossmayer University of Osijek
- Sveučilište Josipa Jurja Strossmayera u Osijeku
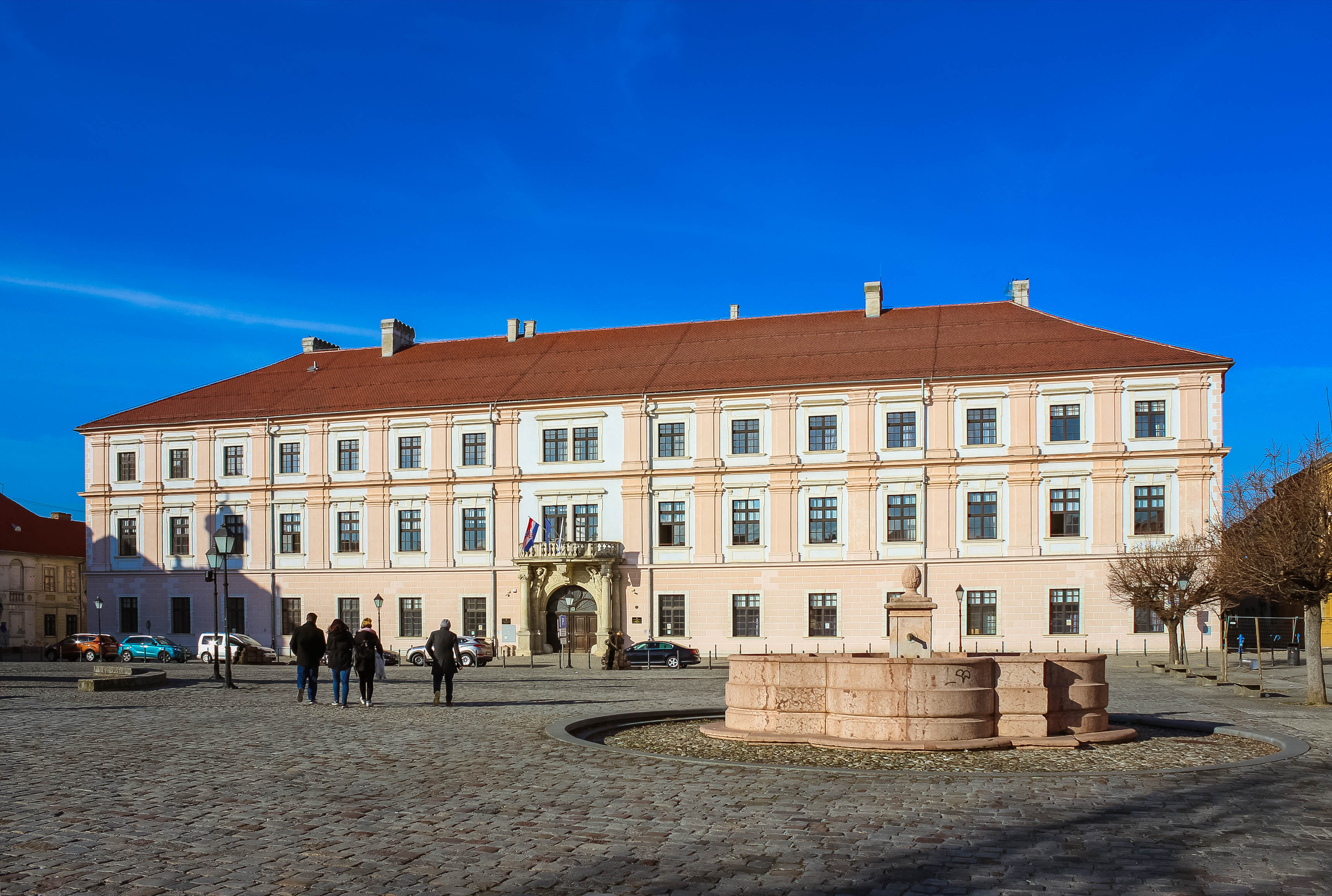
- Palace of Slavonian General Command
- Other names: UNIOS
- Former names: University of Osijek (1975–1990)
- Type: Public
- Established: 1975 (modern day university) 1707 Franciscans Philosophy School; 1806 Lyceum episcopale, which turned into a gymnasium in 1850 and the High Theological College in 1931; 1893 Royal Male Teachers School which became Academy of Pedagogy in 1961 1967 Department of the Zagreb Technical College
- Founders: Socialist Republic of Croatia
- Parent institution: University of Zagreb
- Affiliations: European University Association
- Rector: Vlado Guberac
- Academic staff: c. 1,100 (2015)
- Students: c. 15,000 (2018)
- Location: Trg Svetog Trojstva 3, 31 000 Osijek, Osijek-Baranja County, Croatia; 45°33′40″N 18°41′46″E
- Campus: Urban
- Language: Degree programs in Croatian and Hungarian, particular courses in other languages.
- Accreditation: Croatian Agency for Science and Higher Education
Colors
Blue and white
- Website: www.unios.hr

University rankings

Regional – Overall
- QS Emerging Europe and Central Asia: 231-240 (2022)

The Josip Juraj Strossmayer University of Osijek (Croatian: Sveučilište Josipa Jurja Strossmayera u Osijeku, Latin: Universitas studiorum Mursensis), commonly known as the University of Osijek (UNIOS), is a public university based in Osijek, Croatia. Established in 1975, it is the flagship institution of higher education in Slavonia, and one of the largest and oldest universities in Croatia.

The University of Osijek is organized into 11 faculties, an academy and a number of other organizational units. In 1990 it took the name of progressive Roman Catholic bishop Josip Juraj Strossmayer who was born in the city in 1815. Alongside nationally dominant University of Zagreb, the University of Osijek belongs to the mid-range public institutions established before the independence of Croatia together with the University of Rijeka and the University of Split.

The university was established in 1970s, when several faculties were grouped under one university. In the years preceding the establishment of the university Croatia witnessed the establishment of new universities in Split and Rijeka. 1970s was a decade of exponential rise in number of higher education institutions in the rest of former Yugoslavia as well when universities in Maribor, Mostar, Banja Luka, Podgorica, Bitola, Kragujevac and Tuzla all opening their doors.

The University of Osijek is a member of the European University Association. The University of Slavonski Brod, second public university in Slavonia, developed from local organisational units of the University of Osijek located in Slavonski Brod.

== History ==
=== Early history ===
The history of higher education in this area began in 1707, when the first institution of higher education was founded in Osijek. It was the Higher Theological School, which was opened in the 1707/1708 academic year as Studium Philosophicum Essekini, and included a three-year course of studies in philosophy.

The significance of the first colleges in Osijek lies in its huge contribution to Croatian language and literature, the spreading of liberal-arts education, and the study of languages and classical literature.

=== Development of higher education in the city ===
The recent history of higher education in the area began in 1959 when the Zagreb Faculty of Economics, in collaboration with the University of Zagreb, founded the centre for part-time studies in Osijek as a branch of the Zagreb Faculty of Economics.

=== Founding of the University ===
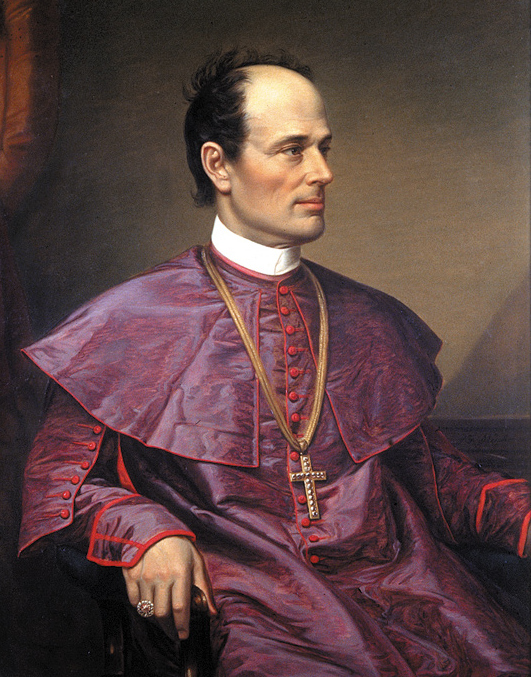
In 1990 university was renamed after Josip Juraj Strossmayer.

The initiative for the founding of the University of Osijek dates back to 1975. On 26 March 1975, the Croatian Parliament (Sabor) passed the Decision granting consent for the establishing of the University of Osijek. Two months later, on 31 May 1975, the Agreement concerning the founding of the University of Osijek was signed by the Faculty of Economics, the Faculty of Agriculture and Food Processing, the Institute of Agriculture, the Zagreb School of Engineering and Naval Architecture for Engineering Studies in Slavonski Brod, the Teacher Training College in Osijek, the Zagreb Music Academy for the Music Department in Osijek, the City Library and the Historical Archives in Osijek.

In the following years, the university developed with founding of various faculties: in 1975 the Faculty of Law, in 1976 the Faculty of Food Technology, in 1977 the Faculty of Education, in 1979 the School of Engineering in Slavonski Brod and Medical Studies in Osijek, which developed into the Faculty of Medicine in 1998, in 1982 the Faculty of Civil Engineering, in 1990 the Electrical Engineering Studies developed into the Faculty of Electrical Engineering, and in the same year, the Senate of the university passed the decision to include the name of Josip Juraj Strossmayer in the name of the university.

== Organization ==
Twelve faculties, Academy of Arts, the Departments of Mathematics, Biology, Chemistry and Physics offer courses of studies in natural sciences, technical sciences, biomedicine and medicine, biotechnical sciences, social sciences and the humanities.

There are three more affiliated institutions of the University of Osijek that contribute to and support higher education: the City and University Library in Osijek, the Student Centre in Osijek and the Student Centre in Slavonski Brod. In the years ahead, the main activity of the Josip Juraj Strossmayer University Administration will be to ensure the regular functioning of the university, including teaching and publishing, research and cooperation between universities in the country and abroad, and the reconstruction and development of the university.

The long-term plans and programs envisage the development of university facilities at three main locations in the city of Osijek: Tvrđa, "Drava" and "Gaj" barracks.

- Faculty of Economics, University of Osijek
- Faculty of Law, University of Osijek
- Faculty of Agriculture, University of Osijek
- Faculty of Food Technology, University of Osijek
- Faculty of Civil Engineering, University of Osijek
- Faculty of Electrical Engineering, University of Osijek
- Faculty of Mechanical Engineering - Slavonski Brod
- Faculty of Philosophy
- University of Osijek Faculty of Teacher Education
- Faculty of Medicine, University of Osijek
- Faculty of Dental medicine and health
- Catholic Faculty of Theology - Đakovo
- Academy of Arts and Culture in Osijek
- Faculty of Applied Mathematics and Informatics
- Department of Biology
- Department of Physics
- Department of Chemistry
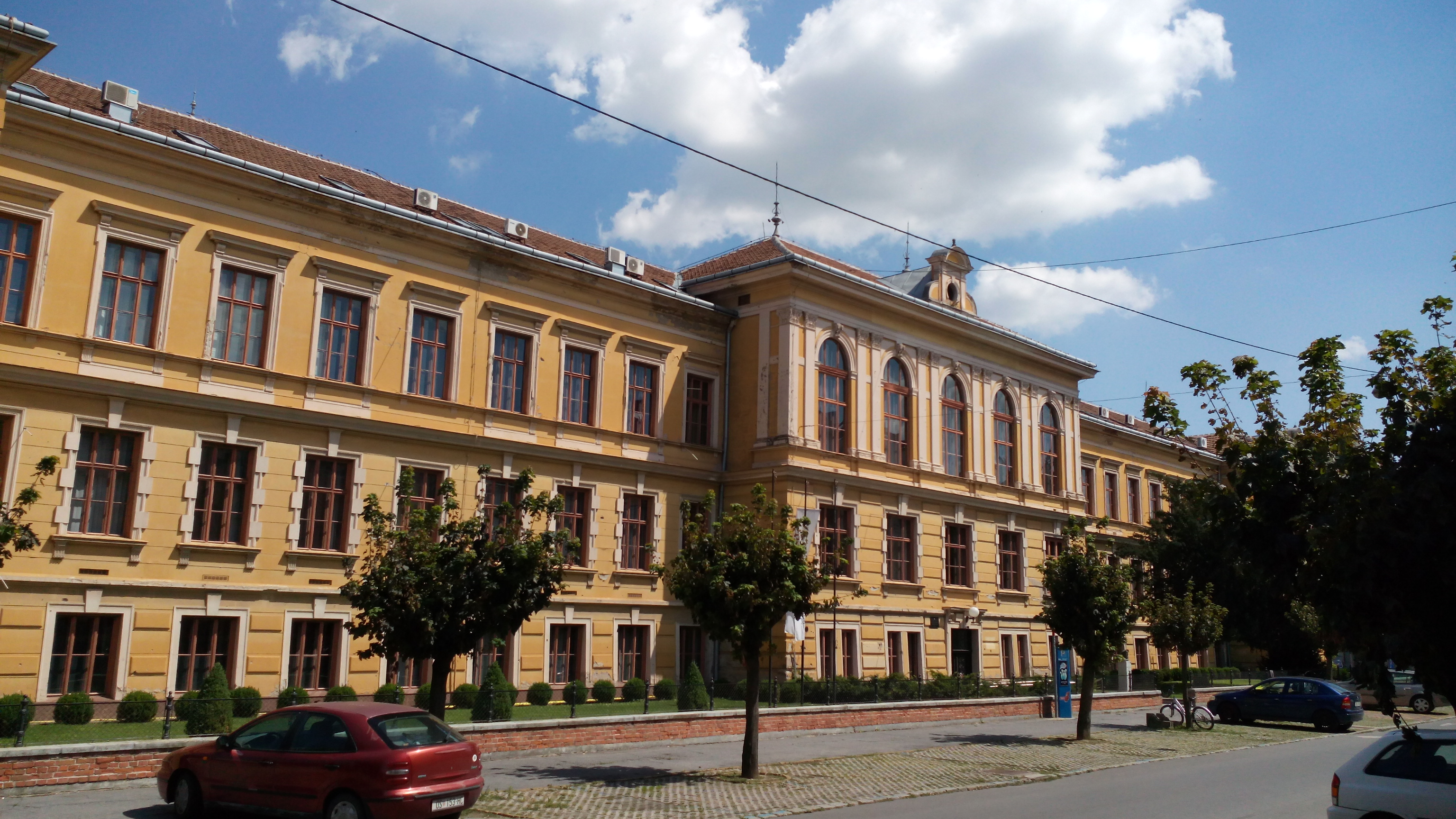
Faculty of Philosophy

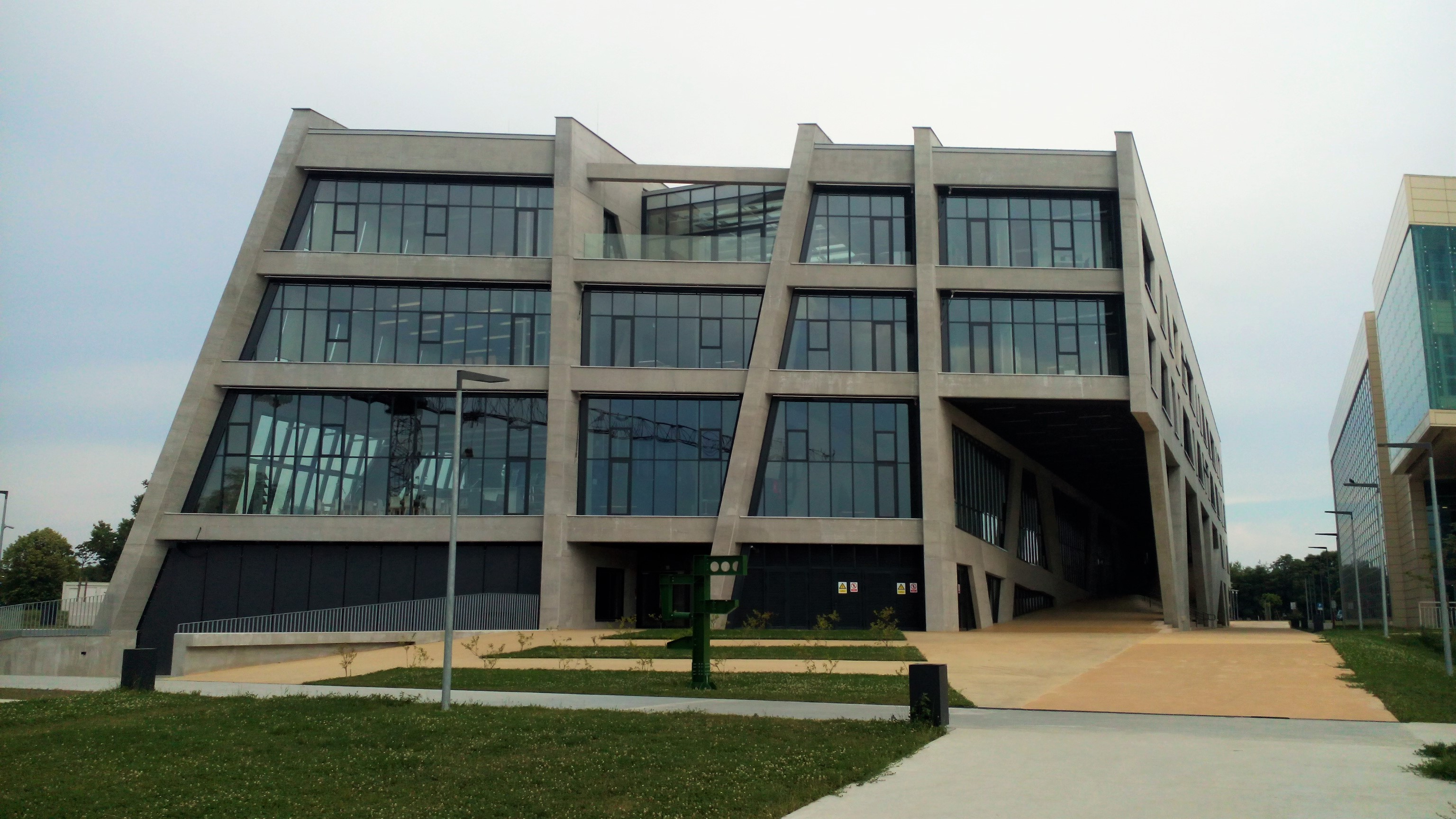
Faculty of Civil Engineering

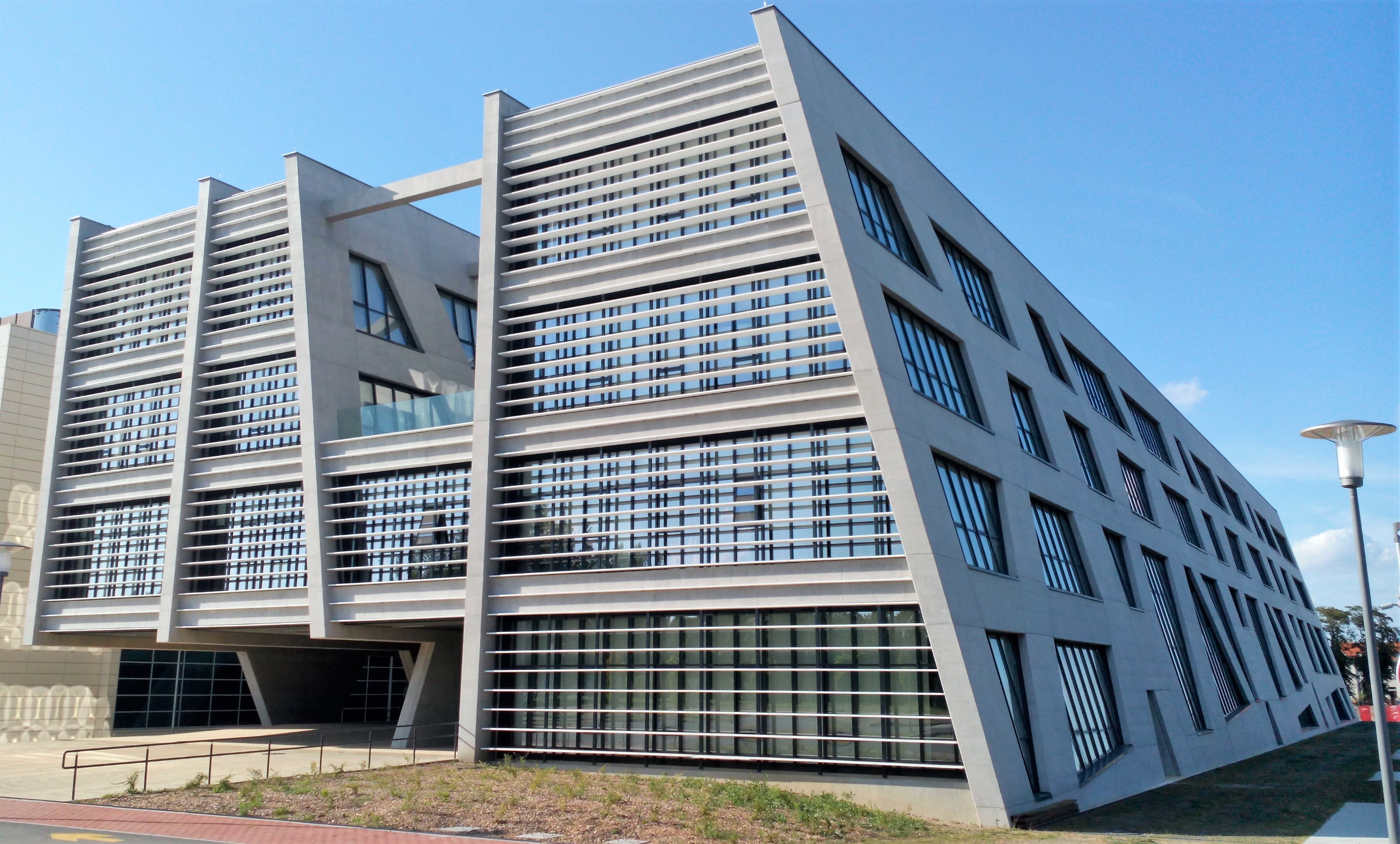
Faculty of Civil Engineering

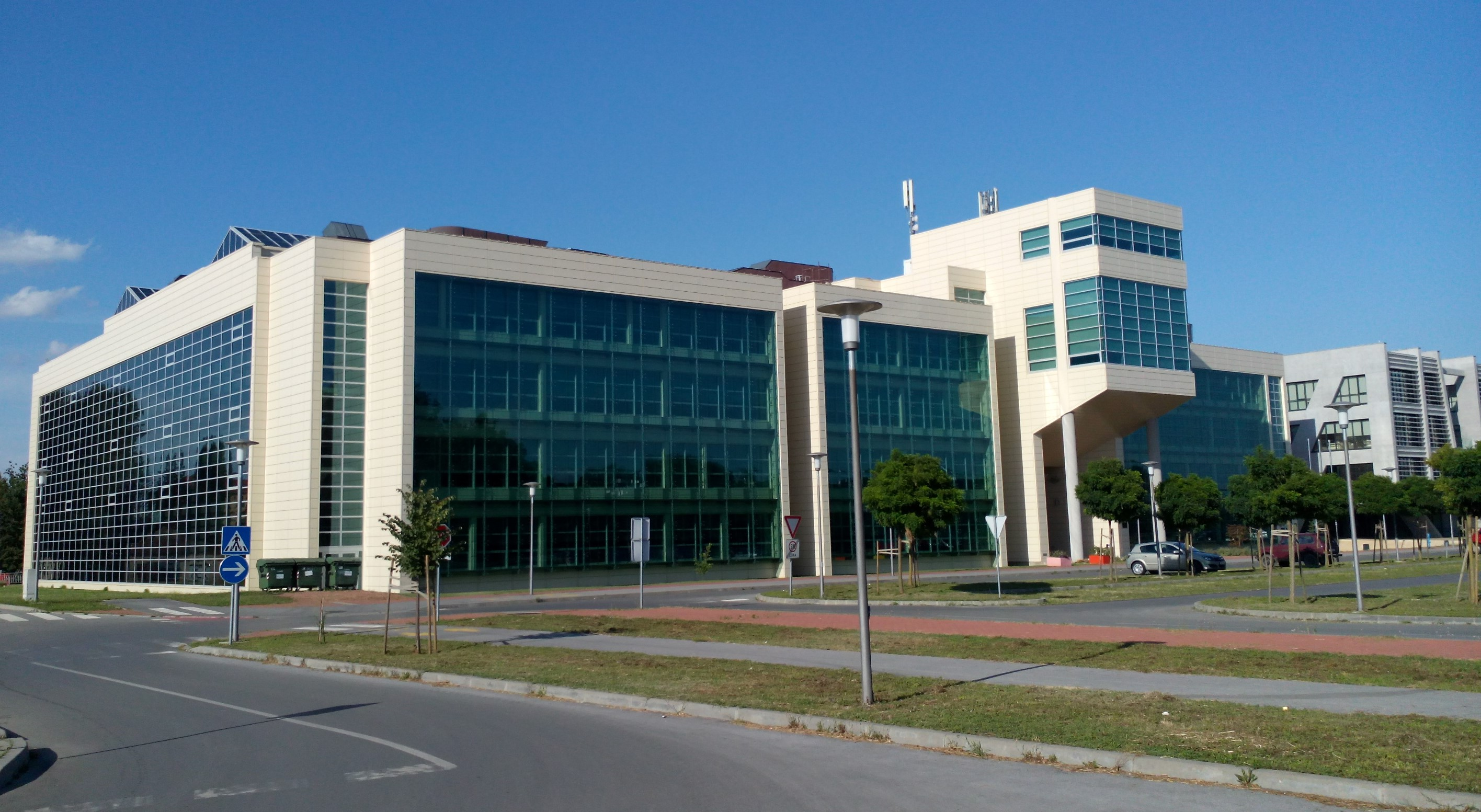
Faculty of Agriculture

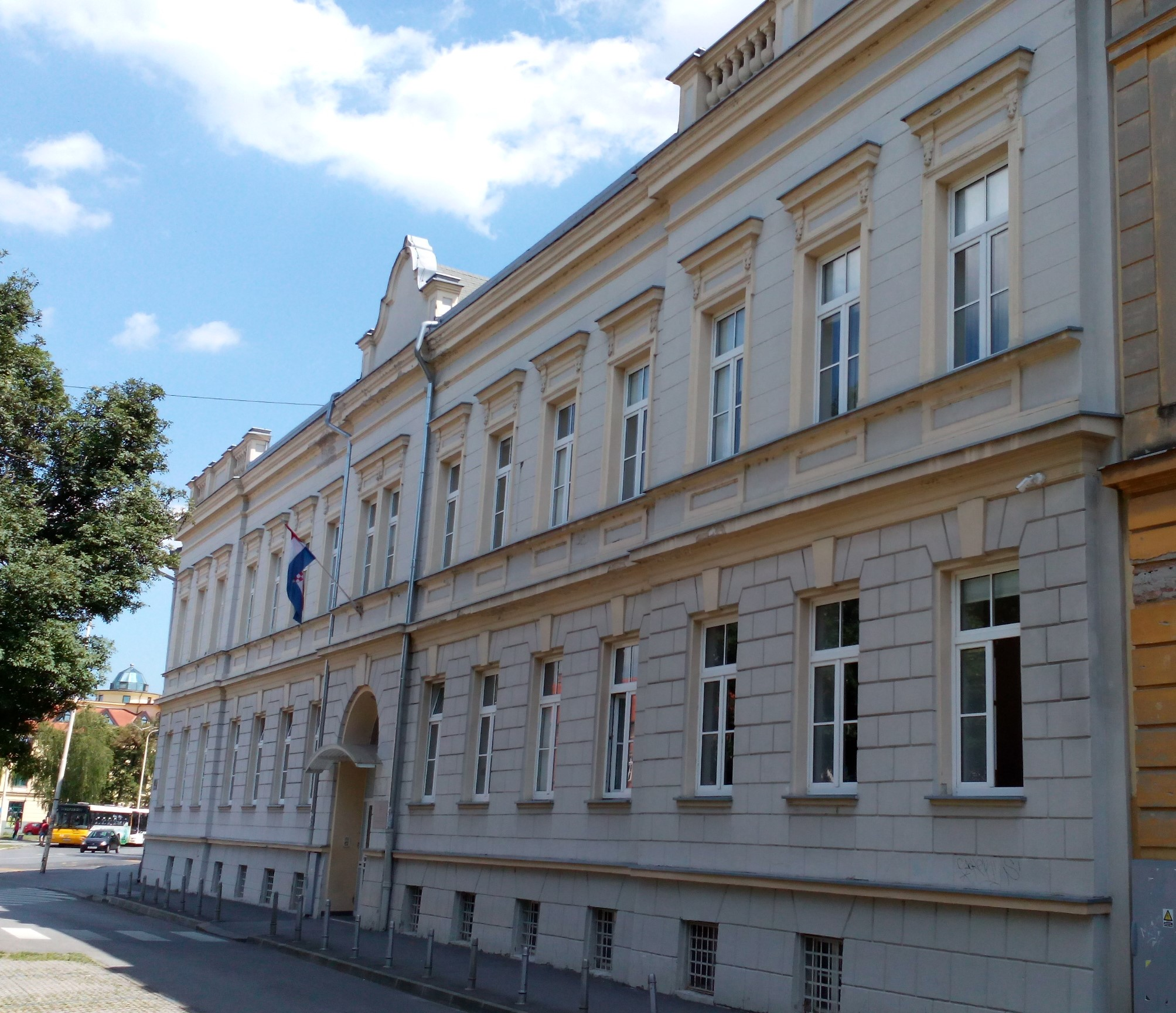
Faculty of Economics

== Rankings ==
The QS World University Rankings placed the University of Osijek in the 201-250 range in the Emerging Europe and Central Asia in 2019. In 2018 Webometrics Ranking of World Universities ranked it as the Croatia's fourth best university among the 49 ranked institutions of tertiary education from the country.

== See also ==
- City and University Library in Osijek
- List of universities and colleges in Croatia
- Education in Croatia
- Museum of Slavonia
- Archaeological Museum Osijek
- Croatian National Theatre in Osijek
- I Gymnasium Osijek
- II Gymnasium Osijek
- III Gymnasium Osijek
- Jesuit Classical Gymnasium in Osijek
- Polytechnic Lavoslav Ružička Vukovar
