= Votive statue of the Holy Trinity =

Statue in Osijek, Croatia

Coordinates: 45°33′38″N 18°41′45″E

- Zavjetni kip Presvetog Trojstva
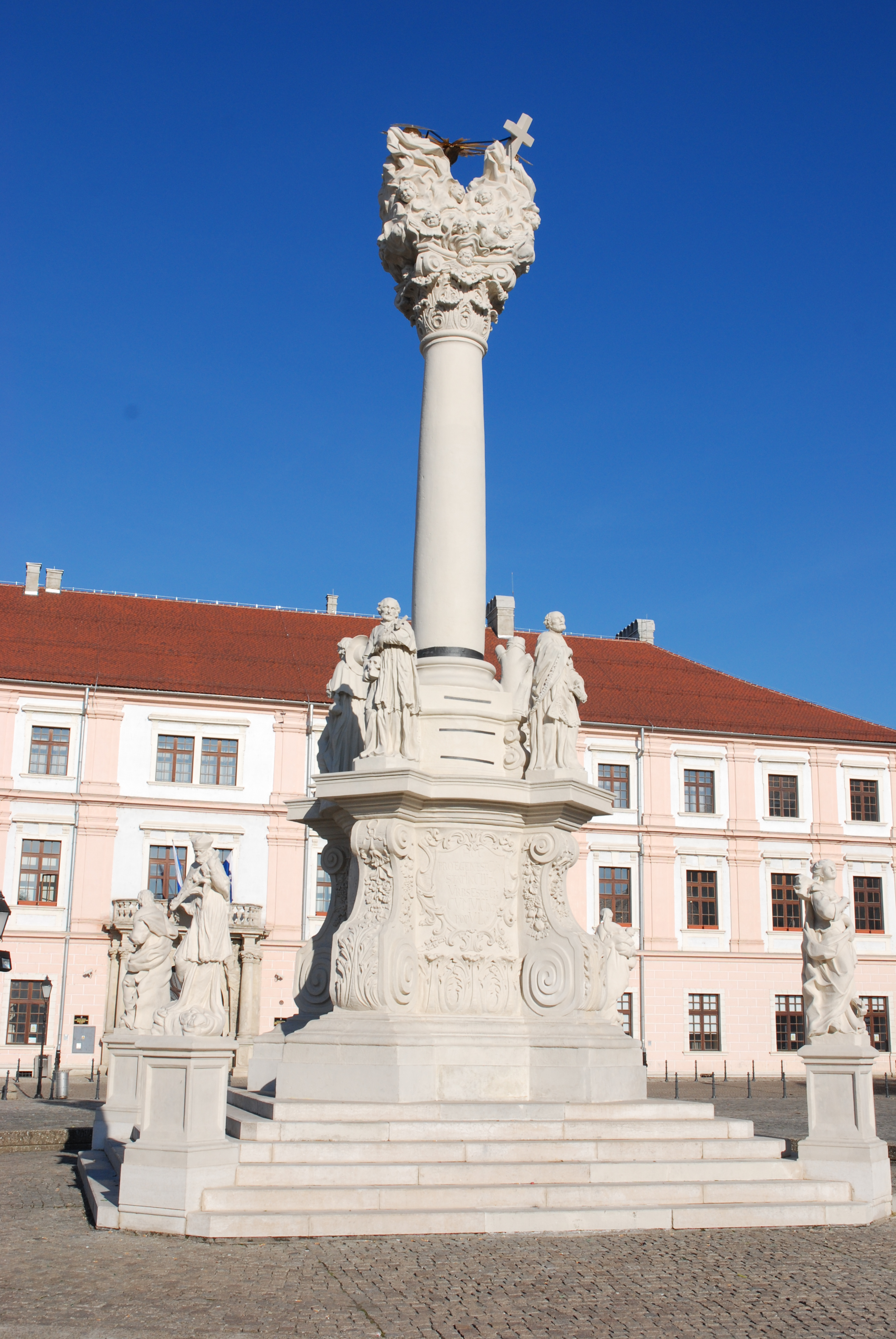
- Interactive map of the Votive statue of the Holy Trinity area
- Alternative names: Kužni pil

General information
- Architectural style: Baroque
- Location: Tvrđa, Osijek, Croatia
- Construction started: 1729
- Completed: 1730; 296 years ago
- Renovated: 1784, 1829, 1867, 2011

Design and construction
- Architect: Joseph Gerupp (probably)

Votive statue of the Holy Trinity (Croatian: Zavjetni kip Presvetog Trojstva) is a stone statue representing the Holy Trinity in Osijek, Croatia. It is located in Tvrđa, on Holy Trinity Square.

== History ==
The statue was built between 1729 and 1730 in memory of a vow against plague, which was common in the 18th century in Slavonia. The making of the statue was funded by baroness Marija Ana Petraš, who was the widow of the hussar general, vice marshal Maksimilijan Petraš.

The statue was built in the baroque style. The architect was, probably, Joseph Gerupp from Maribor.

== Description ==
The statue consists of a high pedestal with gigantic volutes, bearing five statues of saints invoked as defenders against plague: Saint Sebastian, Saint Roch, Saint Charles Borromeo, Saint Francis Xavier and Saint Rosalia. On the pedestal rises a tall pillar bearing a sculptural group of the Holy Trinity, which shows the figures of God the Father, Christ and the Holy Spirit (the latter represented as a dove).

There was a renovation in 1784 that added an external footer, on which are situated smaller statues of Saint Joseph, Holy Mary, Saint Catherine and Saint John of Nepomuk.

There are five Latin inscriptions carved on the statue, which contain chronograms. They mention the years of the building and renovation of the statue: 1729, 1730, 1829 and 1867.
