= Tvrđa =

Old town of Osijek, Croatia

- Osijek, Croatia
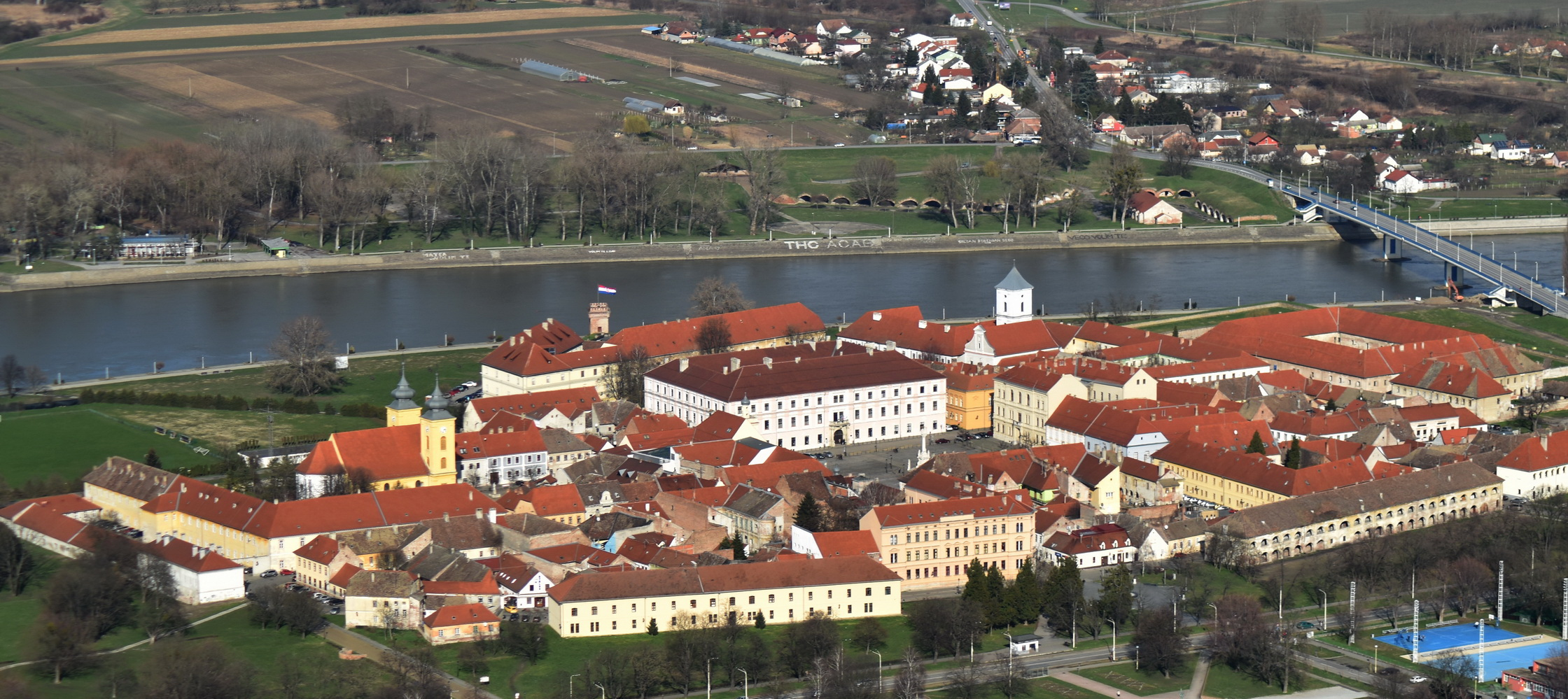
- Aerial view of the old town Tvrđa

Site information
- Type: Star fort
- Controlled by: List of rulers: from its foundation to 1526 Kingdom of Hungary; 1691–1744 Kingdom of Croatia within Habsburg monarchy; 1744–1804 Kingdom of Slavonia within Habsburg monarchy; 1804–1867 Kingdom of Slavonia within Austrian Empire; 1867–1918 Kingdom of Croatia-Slavonia within Austria-Hungary

Location
- Location within Croatia
- Coordinates: 45.561073°N 18.696093°E

Site history
- Built: 1693–1735
- Built by: Habsburg monarchy Architects involved: 1691 Mathias von Kaiserfeld; 1712 Maximilian Gosseau de Henef
- Materials: Limestone, brick

Tvrđa (Citadel) is the old town of the city of Osijek in Croatia. It is the best-preserved and largest ensemble of Baroque buildings in Croatia and consists of a Habsburg star fort built on the right bank of the River Drava. Tvrđa has been described by the World Monuments Fund as "a unique example of an eighteenth-century baroque military, administrative, and commercial urban center".

The star fort was constructed in the immediate vicinity of medieval Osijek after the defeat of the Ottoman forces in 1687, due to Osijek's strategic importance. Constructed starting in 1712 to plans by Mathias von Kaiserfeld and then Maximilian Gosseau de Henef, all five planned bastions and two gates were complete by 1715. By 1735, the inner town was finished and three northern bastions had been added. When complete, it was the largest and most advanced Habsburg fortress on the border with the Ottoman Empire, consisting of eight bastions and featuring armories, depots, a garrison headquarters, military court, construction office, a garrison physician, guardhouse, officers' apartments, a military hospital and seven barracks. The completed fort was entirely surrounded with walls and palisades and had four main gates at each side (north, south, east, west). Tvrđa had street lights by 1717 and was the site of the first public water supply in Croatia, opened in 1751.

Tvrđa's military importance decreased after the Berlin Congress of 1878, with the increasing stability of the surrounding region. Most of the fort walls and fortifications were destroyed in the 1920s due to the obstacle they presented to the development of Osijek. While the fortifications have largely been removed, the fort's interior core remains intact and is now home to churches, museums, schools and other public buildings, as well as numerous bars and restaurants. Of the fortification system, only the northern side of the walls now remain intact, as well as parts of the first and eighth bastions along with the northern gate known as the 'water gate' ('vodena vrata'). Tvrđa sustained significant damage during the Croatian War of Independence during the 1990s and was featured on the 1996 World Monuments Watch List of Most Endangered Sites. It now features on Croatia's 'tentative list' for consideration as a nominee for a World Heritage Site.

== History ==
=== Medieval and Ottoman eras ===
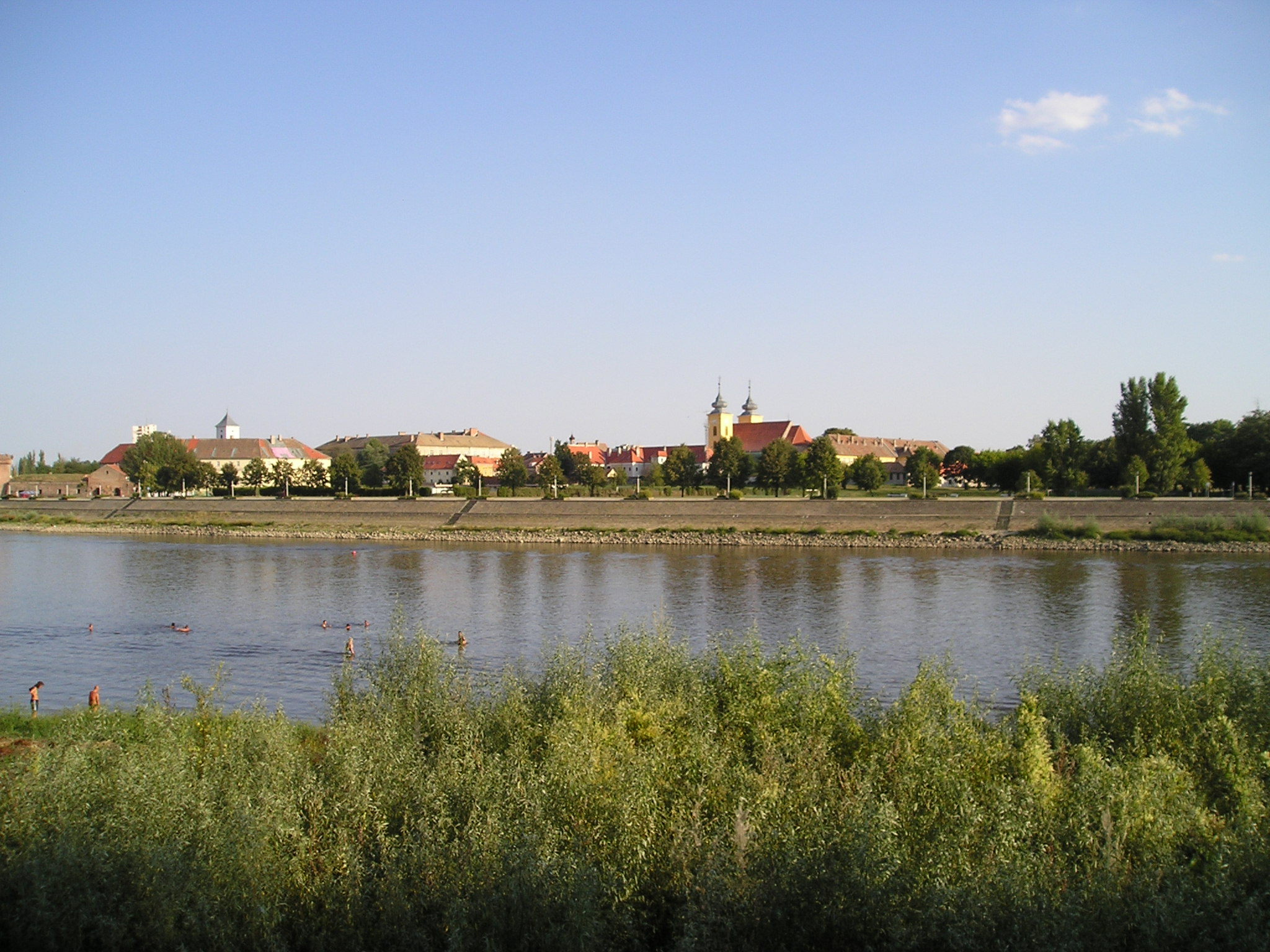
Tvrđa viewed from across the River Drava (possible location of the former Suleiman Bridge).

The new name of Osijek first appeared in 1196. The center of medieval Osijek was on the banks of the River Drava where Tvrđa now stands. The town was a trade and port settlement from the early 12th century due to its position on the way from Pécs and Buda southwards. The site was home to the Romanesque church of the Holy Trinity. Between 1526 and 1687 Osijek was ruled by the Ottomans, who did not change the layout of the settlement in any substantial way but introduced Islamic places of worship, giving the area an Oriental appearance. Traces of medieval and Ottoman towns remain to this day, including a remnant of the old Ottoman fortress wall, known today as the "Turkish Wall" (Turski zid) or "Filibey's Fort" (Filibejeva utvrda), lying next to the Tvrđa access road.

During the Ottoman period, Osijek was internationally known because of the Suleiman Bridge. The construction of the bridge was begun by İbrahim Pasha on 16 August 1526 following the orders of Suleiman the Magnificent. The bridge, which connected Osijek and Darda, took the form of a wooden road on piers and was approximately 7 kilometres (4.3 mi) long and 6 metres (20 ft) wide. Seen as a great threat to Christian Europe the bridge was attacked several times, being destroyed in 1664, when it was set on fire on the orders of Hungarian feudal lord Nicholas VII of Zrin (Croatian: Nikola VII. Zrinski, Hungarian: VII. Zrínyi Miklós). The bridge was rebuilt during the rule of Suleiman II. Finally, it was burned down by the Habsburg armies in 1686.

=== Design and construction ===
==== First layout in late 17th century ====
Development of the military settlement at Tvrđa started in 1687 when the Habsburg armies drove the Ottomans out of the city during the Great Turkish War. The chief commander of the Imperial army, Louis William, Margrave of Baden-Baden, saw Osijek as a location of exceptional strategic importance in the war against the Ottomans. He urged the repair of the city walls, and proposed construction of a new fort according to Vauban's principles of military engineering.

The town magistrate was established in 1690, while the plans for the new fort were still being drawn up, and one of its documents from August of the same year described the condition of the settlement as "ruinous". Two months later, on 29 October, the Ottoman army suddenly attacked. The attack was repulsed only thanks to a well-organised defense, and the Turks withdrew on 6 November, after a brief siege. The event was a clear lesson that the construction of the fort must not be delayed any further. The first phase of Tvrđa's conversion into a Baroque fortress was based on the plan devised by the engineer Mathias von Kaiserfeld from 1691.

==== Second layout in 18th century ====
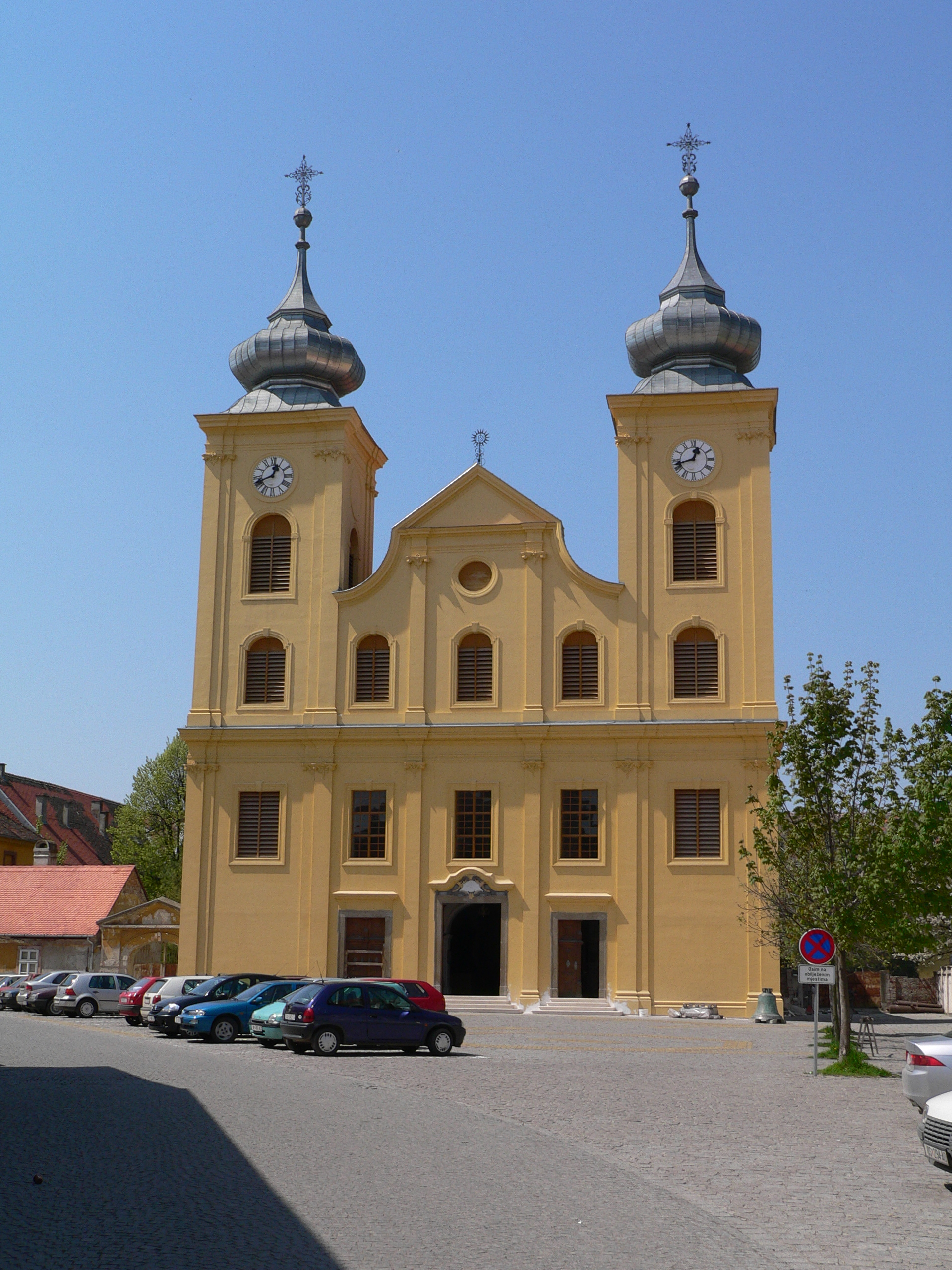
This single-nave St. Michael's Church with two towers (1725–1748) was built by the Jesuits on the foundations of the Kasim-pasha's Mosque.

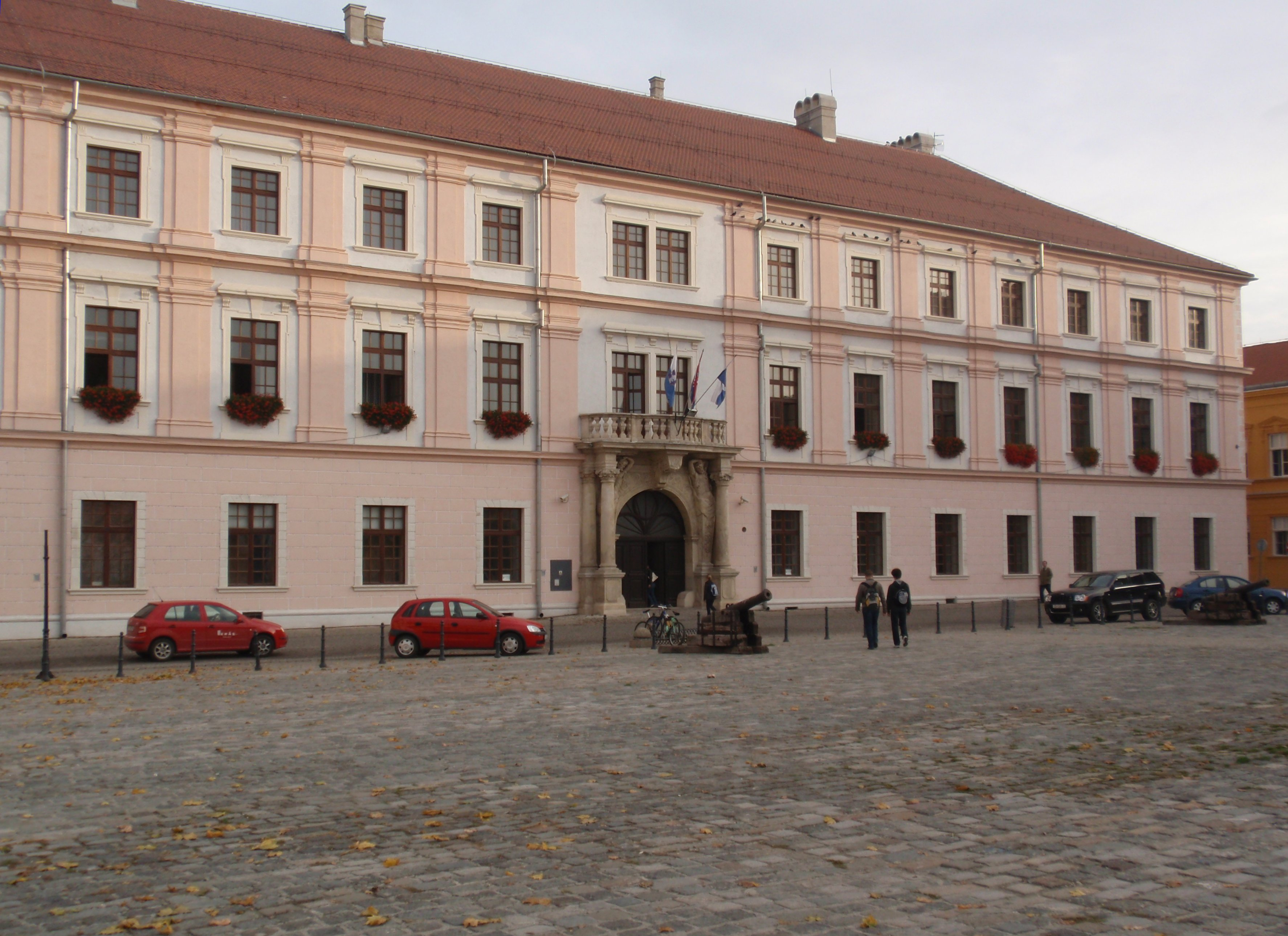
Former General Command is featured on 200 kuna banknote

The original plan for Tvrđa was drafted because of the need to reinforce the town walls, but did not include provisions to redesign the interior and envisaged largely uncontrolled development. New plans for a fort on the right bank of the River Drava were drawn up by Maximilian Gosseau de Henef. Gosseau took over planning of the fort when construction was already under way. Starting in August 1712, Austrian engineers, supervised by the fort's commander, General Johann Stephan von Beckers, built barracks, staff headquarters, churches and monasteries, surrounded by system of moats, bastions and gun positions, respecting Gosseau's design. The design followed the model of lowland Dutch military fortifications of the period.

By 1715, all five planned bastions and two gates were complete. An additional, western, gate leading to the Upper Town was added in 1716. The construction of the outwork on the opposite bank of the River Drava, designed to offer protection from the north and to serve as a bridgehead, was completed by 1721. The final, fourth gate, leading to the Lower Town, was not added until 1783. Construction of the inner town was completed by 1733, and in 1735 three additional northern bastions were completed, along with a post office, the fort's construction office and a hospital. The completed fort had "eight bastions, two armories, two major depots, garrison headquarters, military court, construction office, garrison physician, guardhouse, officer apartments, military hospital and seven barracks". Based on the 'ring model', the fortifications took up an area of 80 hectares (200 acres), making Tvrđa the largest fortress on the border with the Ottoman Empire.

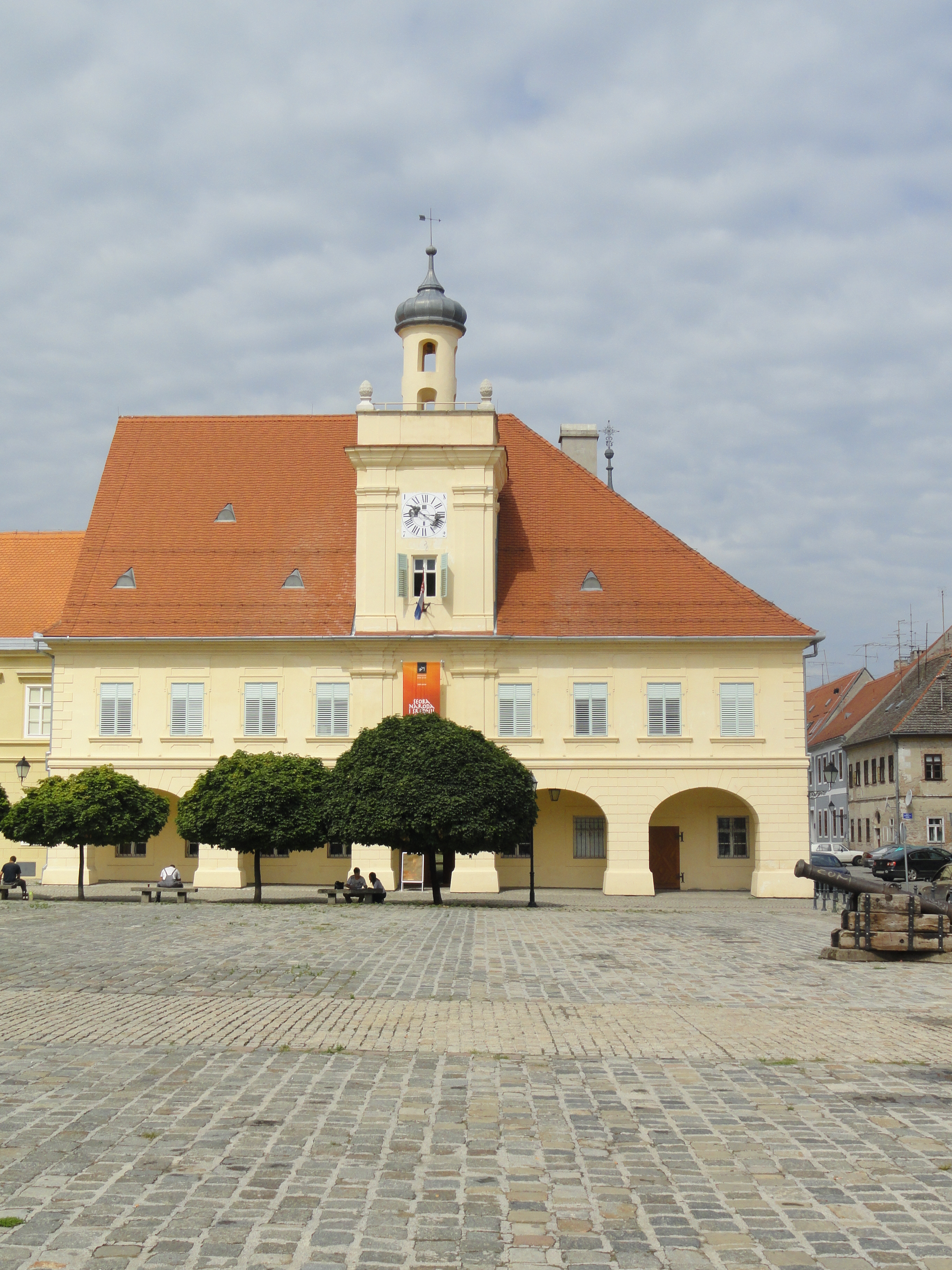
Former City Guard (Croatian: Glavna straža, German: Hauptwache), built in 1729, now hosts the Archaeological Museum.

Gosseau's plan left space for churches to be built where mosques had once stood. Initially, converted mosques were used as churches, but Franciscans started to build a Baroque church in 1709 and it was consecrated in 1732. A Franciscan monastery was built between 1699 and 1705, with a new wing being added between 1731 and 1733, which subsequently became a new monastery in 1761. In 1725, the Jesuits commenced construction of the parish church of St. Michael (Croatian: Sveti Mihovil), following the construction of their own monastery. This church was in use after 1734, despite being incomplete. A Holy Trinity column was erected in the fort's main square in 1730 as a plague monument featuring volutes with pedestals on which four protectors against the plague are placed. Four additional pedestals were added to the monument in 1784, each featuring a statue of a saint. Tvrđa had street lighting as early as 1717. The first system to supply public water in Croatia was opened in Tvrđa in 1751.

In the mid-18th century there were reportedly more than 35 inns in Tvrđa, estimated to an account for one in three of the fort's buildings. Crown prince Joseph stayed in one of the inns when visiting Osijek. In 1786, as Joseph II, he decreed the merger of the Upper Town, Lower Town and Tvrđa into one single town council.

=== 19th and 20th century ===
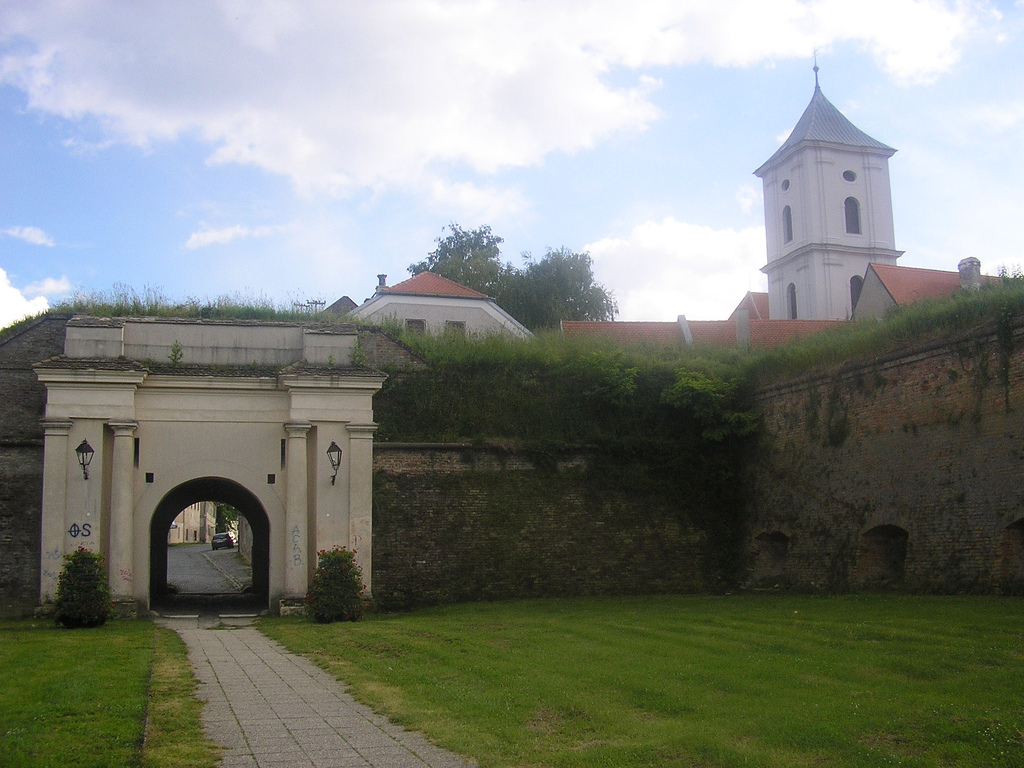
The 'water gate' (Croatian: Vodena vrata) is the only surviving gate out of four that were originally built.

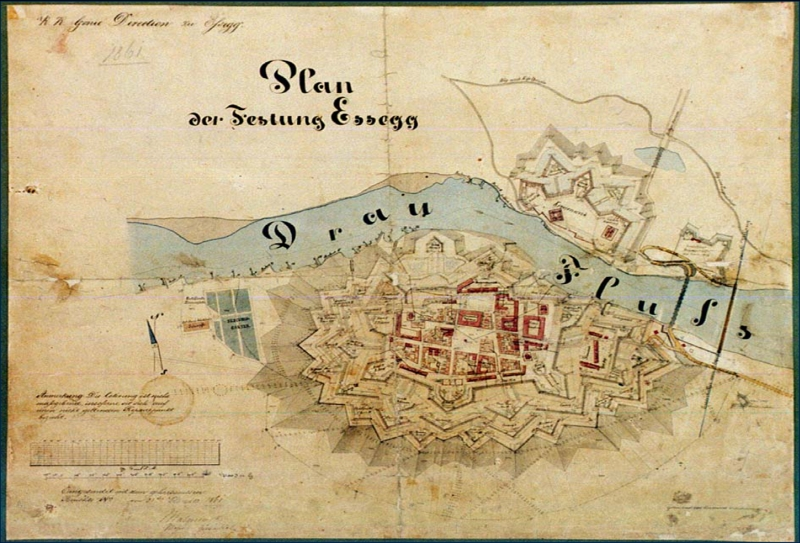
Plan of Tvrđa (German: Festung Essegg) from 1861

As early as the second half of the 18th century there was little or no new constructions taking place in Tvrđa, and even maintenance of the fort became a burden. In 1809 Osijek was granted free royal town status. Osijek's council was accommodated in a building at the south-eastern corner of Tvrđa's main square.

Tvrđa's military importance decreased after the Berlin Congress of 1878 as a result of increasing political and military stability in the region. Two north-western bastions were demolished in the 1870s, making way for Ambrose's Park (Croatian: Ambrozijev perivoj). Construction of the Royal Grammar School started in 1881, and the Royal General Secondary School was completed in 1890. Episcopal seminary was also built in the south-western corner of the main square in 1898. These were the only buildings erected within Tvrđa walls in the last three decades of the 19th century.

As Osijek grew as a city, the fort's presence hindered the potential for urban development. The demolition of most of the fort walls happened between 1923 and 1926, with the construction of an electric tramway. The last gunpowder magazine, located behind the church of St. Michael, was demolished in 1958. While most of the fortifications have been demolished (only the first and eighth bastions and the northern wall with its so-called 'water gate' were kept), the center of Tvrđa remains intact. The Yugoslav People's Army maintained a garrison and a military hospital in Tvrđa, but in the 1980s these buildings were gradually being abandoned, and adapted into ateliers for local painters and sculptors.

From February to June 1986, the fortress town was used as a filming location for the epic American miniseries War and Remembrance. It played the role of the almost identical town of Theresienstadt in Czechoslovakia, which had been converted to a concentration camp known as the "Paradise Ghetto", to which prominent Jews were sent by the Nazis. Stars Jane Seymour, John Gielgud and Robert Stephens filmed throughout the town.

The fort sustained considerable damage during the Croatian War of Independence, which lasted from 1991 until 1995. The war brought structural damage from collapsing roofs, walls and floors. These damages threaten plaster, sculpture and murals that lack proper protection and are subject to continuing decay.

== Present day ==
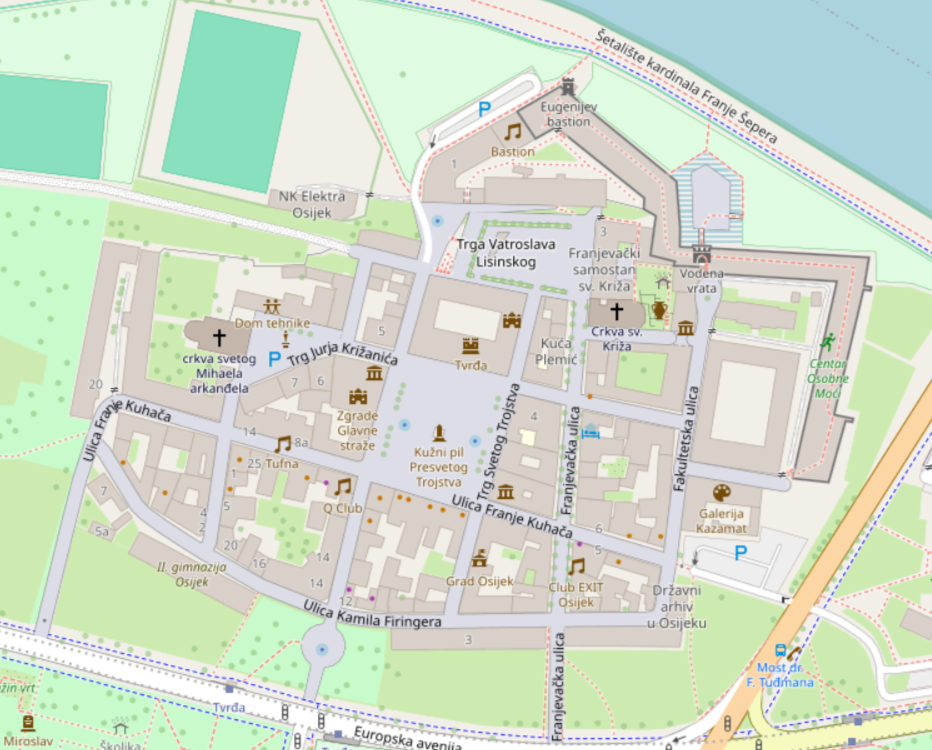
Map of present-day Tvrđa

After the fortress's military importance decreased at the end of the 19th century, Tvrđa became a center of administrative, educational, cultural, and scholarly life in Osijek and the entire region. The first school in Osijek was organized at Tvrđa; the first scholarly curriculum was introduced in 1707, to be later expanded and renewed, and the first printing press started working in 1735. The significance of educational institutions of Tvrđa are best underlined by the fact that Croatian Nobel Prize laureates, Lavoslav Ružička and Vladimir Prelog, along with Serbian scientist Milutin Milanković (Milankovitch cycles), were all alumni (graduates) of the Tvrđa schools. The Faculty of Agriculture of the Josip Juraj Strossmayer University of Osijek has occupied the former general headquarters since 1995 after its previous site was destroyed in the Croatian War of Independence. The Faculty of Food Technology has been relocated to a building that served as the first military hospital in Osijek, from the mid-17th century until the beginning of the 1990s. Other present-day educational institutions in Tvrđa include the II and the III Gymnasium, Franjo Kuhač Music School (former Roman Catholic Seminary), Jesuit Classical Gymnasium (former logistics barracks built in the mid-18th century), and the Secondary School of Economics (former grammar school for girls).

According to the 2001 census, within the Tvrđa city district, which consist of old town Trvđa and its surroundings, there are 10,277 inhabitants living in 3,310 households. The fort interior is now a centre of Osijek's nightlife. There are numerous bars and restaurants in Tvrđa. The fort hosts the Museum of Slavonia, the largest general-type museum in Croatia, located in Tvrđa since 1946. The former town museum and archives building today houses the State Directorate for Monument Protection, a department of the Croatian Ministry of Culture. The patron saint of the Tvrđa is Saint Michael, and his feast day of September 29 is celebrated as the day of the Tvrđa city district.

== Heritage status ==
"I have seen many European towns, but have never found an identical development whereby an existing urban nucleus was turned into a fortification, or a similar town-planning solution".

— Ive Mažuran, an expert on Tvrđa

The World Monuments Fund has described Tvrđa as "a unique example of an eighteenth-century baroque military, administrative, and commercial urban center". Tvrđa is on Croatia's 'Tentative List' for consideration as nominee for the World Heritage Site. During the 1991–95 conflict in Croatia, 90 per cent of the buildings in Tvrđa were damaged to some extent and the fort was featured on the 1996 World Monuments Watch List of Most Endangered Sites. It has not appeared on the list, published every two years, since.

The building of the general headquarters, dating from 1726, and the ground plan of the fortress were depicted on the reverse of the Croatian 200 kuna banknote, issued in 1993 and 2002.

The Agency for Restoration of Osijek Tvrđa (Croatian: Agencija za obnovu osječke Tvrđe) was established in 1999. Its stated goals are protection, restoration and revitalization of Tvrđa. The restoration process aims to preserve architectural, historical and aesthetic qualities of Tvrđa in full accordance with the restoration principles set by the International Council on Monuments and Sites, while maintaining its multifunctional character. International cooperation is also envisioned, in particular with the Council of Europe. The Agency is jointly funded by the Government of Croatia, Osijek-Baranja County and the City of Osijek.
