= I Gymnasium =

I Gymnasium may refer to:

- I Gymnasium Zagreb, a high school in Croatia
- I Gymnasium Osijek, a high school in Croatia
- First Gymnasium, Sarajevo, a high school in Bosnia
