= Jesuit Classical Gymnasium in Osijek =

Jesuit Classical Gymnasium
- Croatian: Isusovačka klasična gimnazija s pravom javnosti

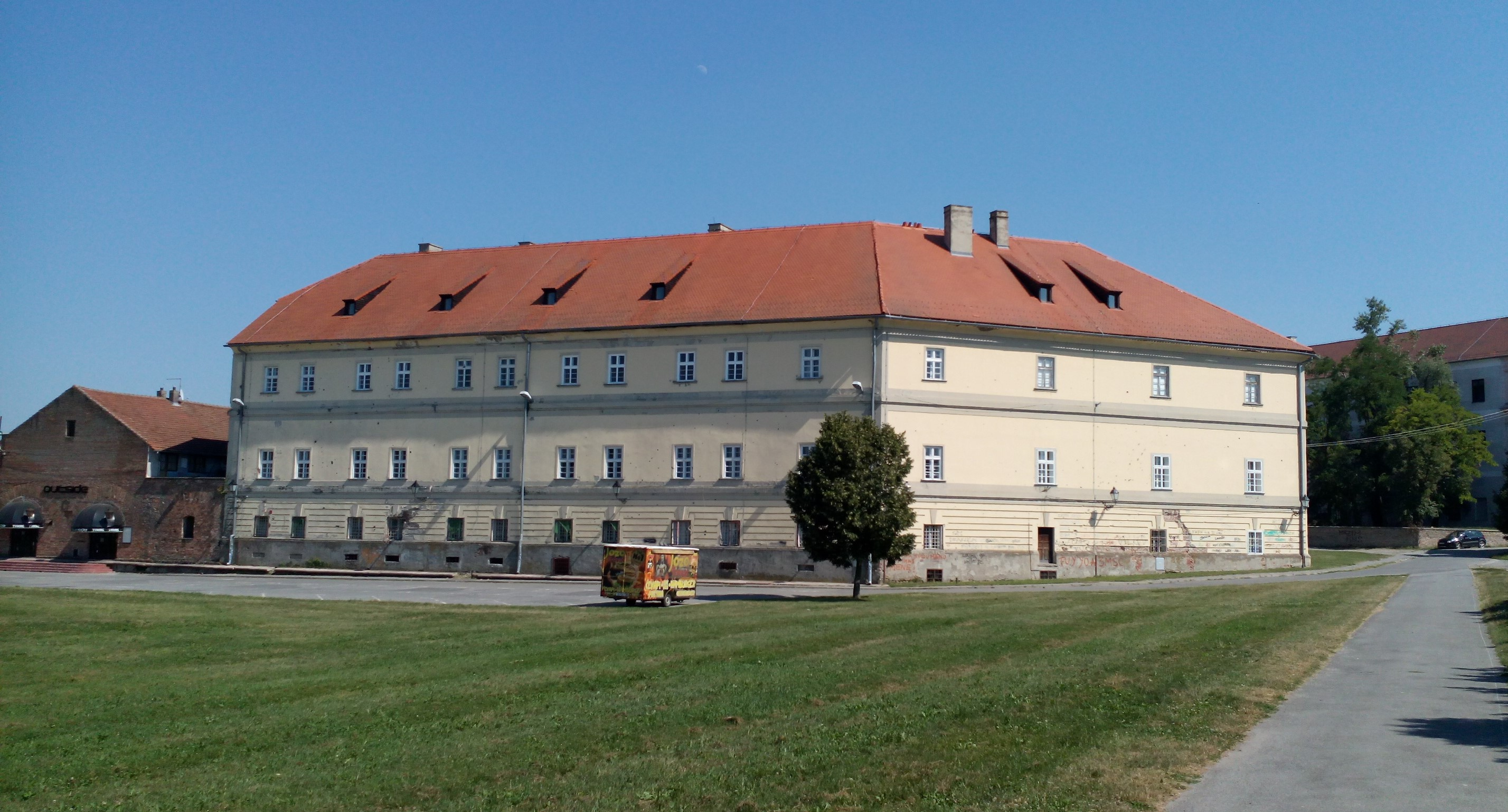
- Jesuit Classical Gymnasium, viewed from the Promenade at Vatroslav Lisinski Square

Location
- Trg Vatroslava Lisinskog 1 Osijek, 31000; Croatia
- Coordinates: 45°33′43″N 18°41′45″E

Information
- Type: Private gymnasium
- Motto: Latin: Semper Magis; Croatian: Uvijek više; (Always more)
- Religious affiliation: Catholicism
- Denomination: Jesuit
- Established: 10 February 1998; 28 years ago
- Founder: Society of Jesus
- Educational authority: Croatian Ministry of Science, Education, and Sports
- Director: Fr. Sebastian Šujević, SJ
- Headmaster: Ivica Musa
- Grades: 9-12
- Language: Croatian
- Newspaper: Semper Magis
- Website: www.ikg.hr

Jesuit Classical Gymnasium with right of public (Croatian: Isusovačka klasična gimnazija s pravom javnosti, IKG) is a private Catholic gymnasium secondary school, located in Tvrđa, the historic core of Osijek, Croatia. The school was founded in 1998 by the Croatian Province of the Society of Jesus.

== History ==
The school was established by Croatian Jesuits on 10 February 1998. On 25 June 1998 the school received permission from the Croatian Ministry of Science, Education, and Sports to open as a classical, 4-year gymnasium. The first school year was 1998/99, with 23 students enrolled. In the next two years there were two classes, as provided for in the school enrollment plan with the approval of the Ministry. Teaching took place in several locations like the Jesuit residence in Osijek and in a space at Gymnasium II. In 2000 the school moved into the new building.

IKG is implementing the Ministry's program for a classical, four-year gymnasium . This includes learning the Latin and Greek language and culture throughout the four years and studying the ancient literature.

The Jesuit ideal is reflected in the school motto: Semper magis (hr. Always More ). The school aims to develop broadminded "men and women for others" who are also firm in their faith and respectful of people with other beliefs, open to dialogue.

== Building ==
The gymnasium building dates back to 1720. In January 2000 the City of Osijek ceded it to the school. Annexes were added and the first two floors saw renovations. In 2005 the school received a building permit to use the attic and to construct an elevator.

== Headmasters ==
Ordinal	Officeholder	Term start	Term end	Time in office	Notes
1	Pero Mijić - Barišić	February 1998	September 1998	7 months	
2	Petar Galauner	1998	2001	2–3 years	
3	Mirko Nikolić	2001	2002	0–1 years	
4	Ivan Matić	2002	2010	7–8 years	
5	Ivica Musa	2010	incumbent	15–16 years	

== See also ==
- Catholic Church in Croatia
- Education in Croatia
- List of Jesuit schools
