= Maximilian Gosseau de Henef =

Austrian architect

Maximilian Gosseau de Henef (also spelled Coseaux and de Heneff) was an Austrian architect of Alsatian descent.

He designed Star fort Tvrđa in Osijek (German: Esseg), in today's Croatia. Gosseau took over planning of the fort when construction was already underway. Gosseau had to tackle quite a few problems. He owed his renown to their solution, which distinguished the Tvrđa as a specific ensemble from other fortifications of the time.

Gosseau de Henef died in 1741 and was buried in a village Nuštar in eastern Croatia, where he owned lands since 1717.
