= County Palace, Osijek =

Public administration building

County Palace
- Županijska palača
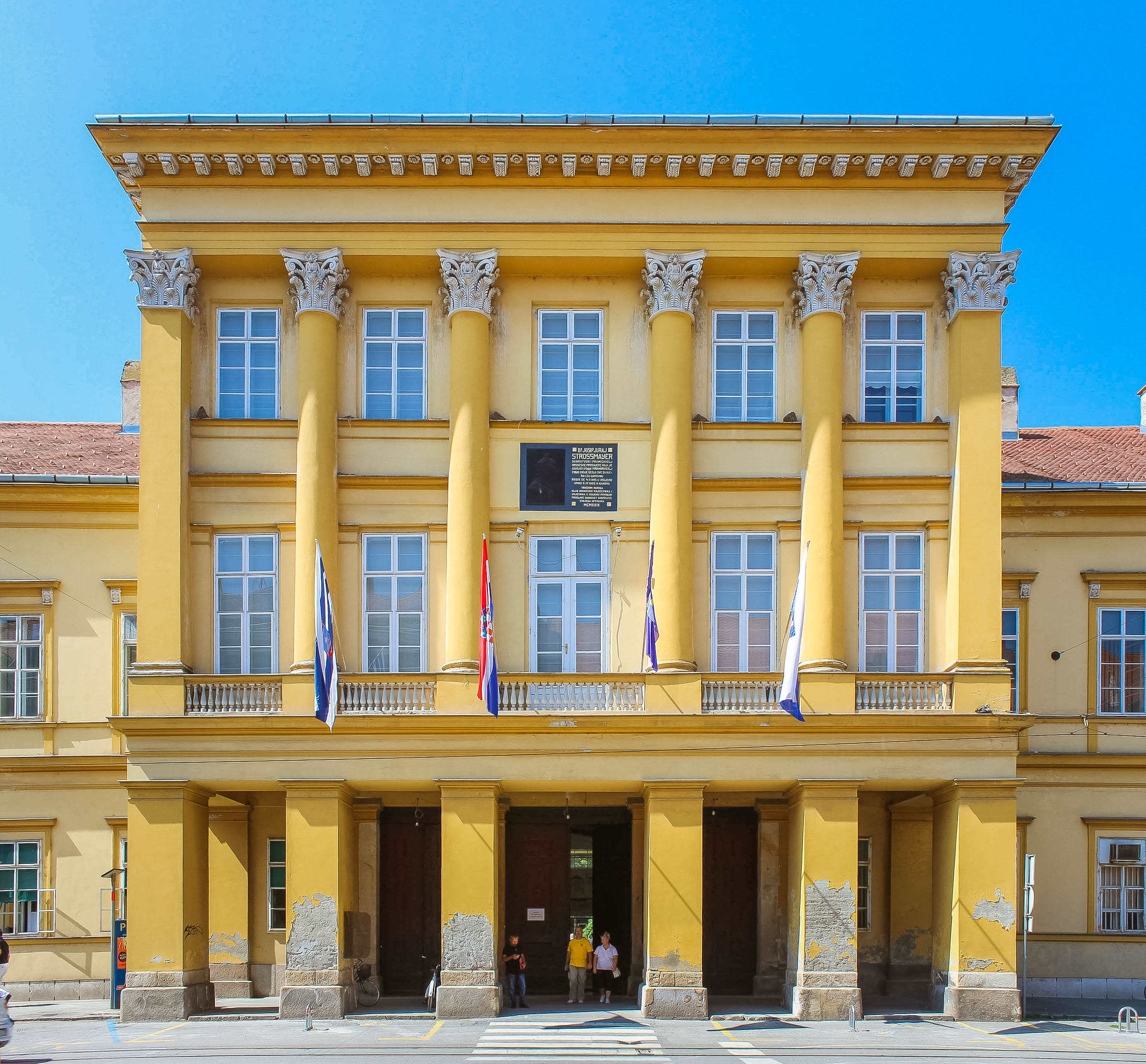
- Interactive map of the County Palace area
- Alternative names: Virovitica County Palace

General information
- Location: Gornji Grad, Osijek, Croatia, 4 Županijska Street
- Coordinates: 45°33′35″N 18°40′34″E
- Current tenants: Office of Public Administration in Osijek-Baranja County
- Construction started: 1840
- Completed: 1846
- Opened: 1846

Design and construction
- Architect: Nikola Hild

The County Palace (Croatian: Županijska palača) is a building in Osijek, Croatia. It currently houses the Office of Public Administration of the Osijek-Baranja County. The building was built as the Virovitica County Palace (Croatian: Palača Virovitičke županije, Hungarian: Verőce vármegyei palota) originally built to host the institutions of the Virovitica County. The palace is considered to be one of the most monumental Croatian public architecture buildings of the first half of the 19th century.

== History ==
The palace was built as the seat of the Virovitica County, which had relocated its administrative centre from Virovitica to Osijek in 1755. Before the building of the palace, county offices were scattered across the city in inadequate spaces. The building was constructed between 1834 and 1846. The cornerstone was laid in 1842, and construction completed in 1846. In the first half of the 19th century, the architectural landscape of the Kingdom of Slavonia was shaped in large part by Hungarian influence.

Initially, a plan by the French architect Charles de Moreau was considered but rejected due to cost and size. A new plan was commissioned from the Pest-based architect József (Nikola) Hild, which was accepted later in 1837.

On 31 January 1861, as Bishop of Bosnia (Đakovo) and Syrmia Josip Juraj Strossmayer traveled from Đakovo to Osijek for the inaugural session of the Virovitica County assembly after his appointment as the Grand Prefect of Virovitica County, crowds from all social classes gathered in front of the Virovitica County Palace to greet him.

== See also ==
- Palace of Slavonian General Command
- Palace of Syrmia County
- Pejačević Castle in Virovitica
