= Virovitica County =

Historic county of the Kingdom of Croatia-Slavonia

Virovitica County Virovitička županija (Croatian) Verőce vármegye (Hungarian)
- County of the Kingdom of Slavonia, Kingdom of Croatia-Slavonia and the Kingdom of Serbs, Croats and Slovenes
- 12th–16th century 1718–1920/1922
- Coat of arms

- Location of the County (red) within the Kingdom of Croatia-Slavonia (white)
- Capital: Osijek
- Area
  - Coordinates: 45°33′N 18°41′E
  - 1910: 4,867 km^{2} (1,879 sq mi)
- Population
  - 1910: 272,430
- History
  - Established: 12th century
  - Treaty of Trianon: 4 June 1920
  - Abolished de jure: 1922
| Succeeded by |
| Osijek Oblast |
- Today part of: Croatia

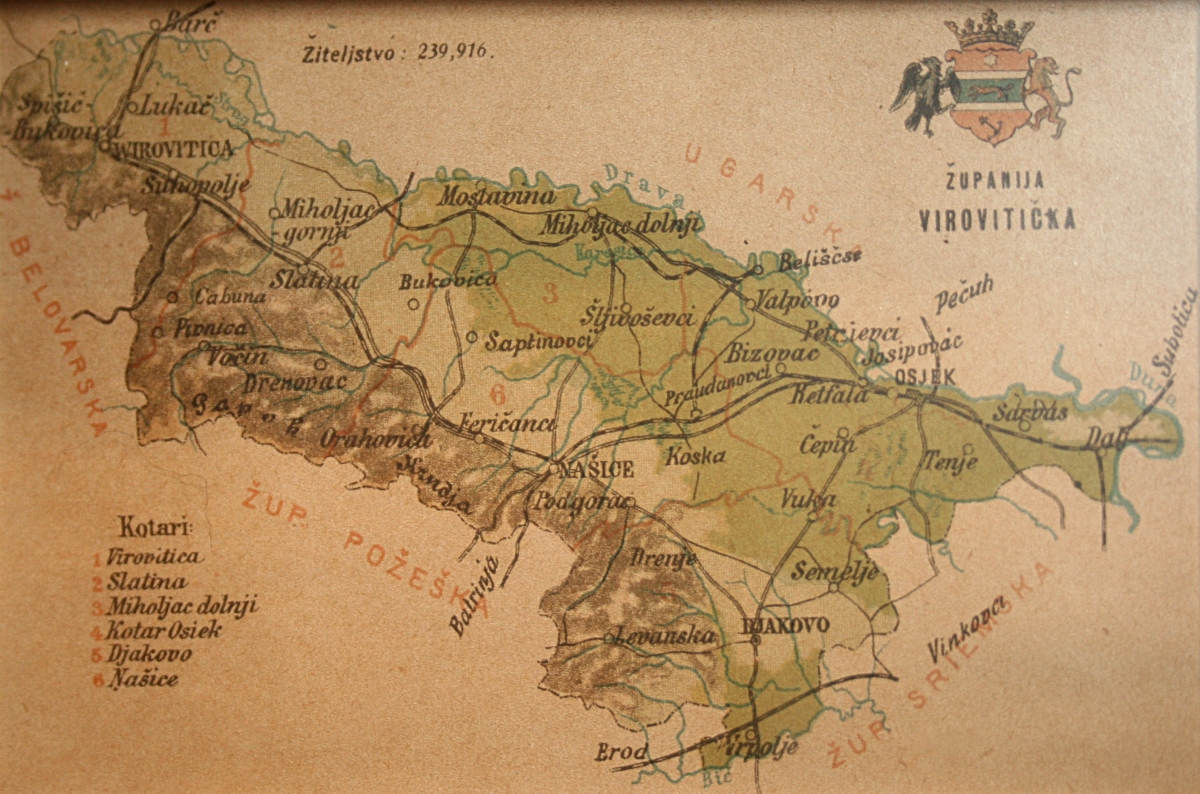
Old map of Virovitica County

Virovitica County (Croatian: Virovitička županija; Hungarian: Verőce vármegye) was an administrative subdivision (županija) of the Medieval Kingdom of Croatia, the Kingdom of Slavonia and the Kingdom of Croatia-Slavonia. Slavonia was an autonomous kingdom within both Croatia and Hungary, themselves within the Habsburg Monarchy/Austrian Empire; Croatia-Slavonia, its successor, was an autonomous kingdom within the Lands of the Crown of Saint Stephen (Transleithania), the Hungarian part of Austria-Hungary. Its territory is now in eastern Croatia. The name of the county comes from the town of Virovitica (Hungarian: Verőce). The capital of the county moved from Virovitica to Osijek (Croatian; Hungarian: Eszék) in the late 18th century.

== Geography ==
Virovitica County shared borders with the Hungarian counties of Somogy, Baranya, Bács-Bodrog, and the Croatian-Slavonian counties of Srijem, Požega and Bjelovar-Križevci. The county stretched along the right (southern) bank of the river Drava, down to its confluence with the river Danube. Its area was 4,867 km^{2} (1,879 sq mi) circa 1910.

== History ==
The territory of Virovitica County was part of the Kingdom of Croatia when it entered into a personal union with the Kingdom of Hungary in 1102, and with it became part of the Habsburg monarchy in 1526. It was conquered by the Ottoman Empire between 1541 and 1552. Ottoman rule in it lasted until 1687. The County was re-established as a county of the Kingdom of Slavonia in 1718, after it was retaken from Ottoman rule.

In 1854, as part of Bach's reforms, it was renamed Osijek County (Comitat Essek) and its territory changed: its western areas around Voćin, Slatina and Virovitica passed to Požega County and it absorbed the western parts of the former County of Syrmia around Vukovar. (The eastern part of Syrmia now belonged to the Voivodeship of Serbia and Banat of Temeschwar.) These changes were reversed in 1860.

In 1868 it became part of Croatia-Slavonia.

In 1920, by the Treaty of Trianon the county became part of the newly formed Kingdom of Serbs, Croats and Slovenes (later renamed to Yugoslavia). It was formally abolished in 1922 when the Vidovdan Constitution came into effect. The county's former territory has been part of Croatia since it became independent from Yugoslavia in 1991.

== Demographics ==
In 1900, the county had a population of 243,101 people and was composed of the following linguistic communities:

Total:

- Croatian: 114,018 (46.9%)
- German: 43,577 (17.9%)
- Serbian: 41,998 (17.3%)
- Hungarian: 33,298 (13.7%)
- Slovak: 4,278 (1.8%)
- Ruthenian: 94 (0.0%)
- Romanian: 21 (0.0%)
- Other or unknown: 5,817 (2.4%)

According to the census of 1900, the county was composed of the following religious communities:

Total:

- Roman Catholic: 188,139 (77.4%)
- Serbian Orthodox: 42,381 (17.4%)
- Jewish: 5,044 (2.1%)
- Calvinist: 4,396 (1.8%)
- Lutheran: 2,330 (1.0%)
- Greek Catholic: 116 (0.0%)
- Unitarian: 8 (0.0%)
- Other or unknown: 147 (0.0%)

In 1910, the county had a population of 272,430 people and was composed of the following linguistic communities:

Total:

- Croatian: 137,394 (50.4%)
- German: 40,766 (15.0%)
- Serbian: 46,658 (17.1%)
- Hungarian: 37,656 (13.8%)
- Slovak: 3,691 (1.4%)
- Ruthenian: 439 (0.2%)
- Romanian: 64 (0.0%)
- Other or unknown: 5,762 (2.1%)

According to the census of 1910, the county was composed of the following religious communities:

Total:

- Roman Catholic: 211,206 (77.5%)
- Serbian Orthodox: 47,994 (17.6%)
- Jewish: 5,199 (2.0%)
- Calvinist: 5,112 (1.9%)
- Lutheran: 2,176 (0.8%)
- Greek Catholic: 677 (0.2%)
- Unitarian: 1 (0.0%)
- Other or unknown: 65 (0.0%)

== Subdivisions ==
From 1854, under the name Osijek county, it was divided into the following districts (Bezirke):

1. Essek (Osijek; environs)
2. Valpo
3. Miholjac dolnji
4. Našice
5. Djakovar
6. Vukovar

The city of Osijek (German: Essek) was directly subordinate to the county (i.e. separate from the Essek district). The administrative structure was reverted in 1860.

In the early 20th century, the subdivisions of Verőce county were:

Districts
| District | Capital |
|---|---|
| Donji Miholjac | Donji Miholjac |
| Đakovo | Đakovo |
| Osijek | Osijek |
| Našice | Našice |
| Slatina | Slatina |
| Virovitica | Virovitica |
Urban counties
Osijek

== See also ==
- Osijek-Baranja County of Croatia
- County Palace, Osijek

== Literature ==
- Taube, Friedrich Wilhelm von (1777). Historische und geographische Beschreibung des Königreiches Slavonien und des Herzogthumes Syrmien. Vol. 1. Leipzig.
- Taube, Friedrich Wilhelm von (1777). Historische und geographische Beschreibung des Königreiches Slavonien und des Herzogthumes Syrmien. Vol. 2. Leipzig.
- Taube, Friedrich Wilhelm von (1778). Historische und geographische Beschreibung des Königreiches Slavonien und des Herzogthumes Syrmien. Vol. 3. Leipzig.
