= Palace of Slavonian General Command =

Baroque building in Osijek, Croatia

- Palača Slavonske Generalkomande
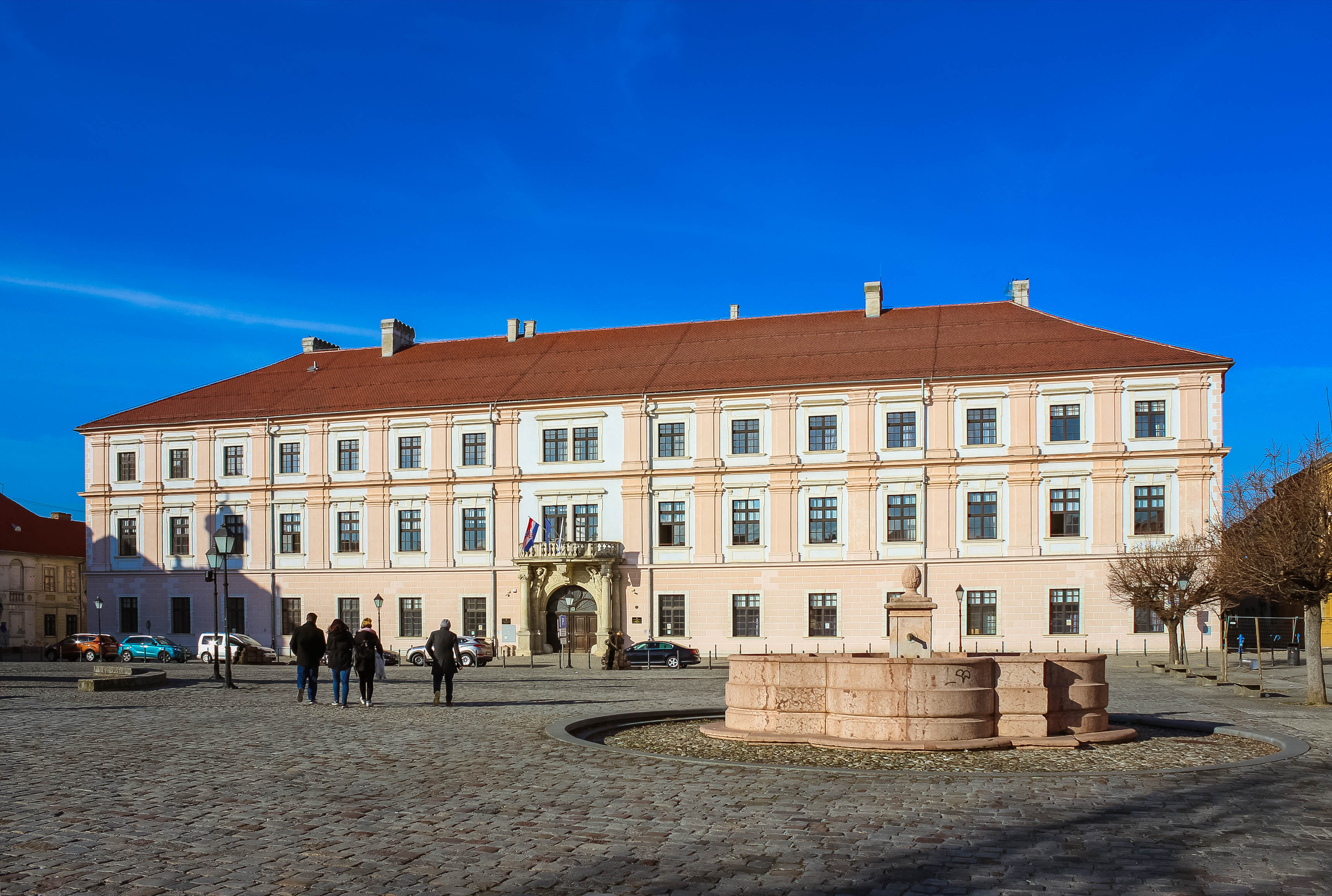
- Interactive map of the Palace of Slavonian General Command area
- Alternative names: Generalkomanda

General information
- Architectural style: Baroque
- Location: Osijek, Croatia, Trg Svetog Trojstva 3
- Coordinates: 45°33′39″N 18°41′46″E
- Current tenants: University of Osijek
- Construction started: 1724
- Completed: 1726
- Opened: 1726; 300 years ago

Technical details
- Floor count: 2

Palace of Slavonian General Command (Croatian: Palača Slavonske Generalkomande) is a building of former Generalship (Generalate) for the Slavonian Military Frontier located in Osijek. Today it is the seat of University of Osijek Rectorate.

It is located on the northern side of the Holy Trinity square in Tvrđa. It is one of the symbols of Osijek and Croatia and it was featured on the reverse of 200 Croatian kuna banknote.

== History ==
It was designed by currently unknown architect and built between 1724 and 1726. The second floor was upgraded in 1765. The architectural style of the building is a synthesis of a Renaissance and Baroque style.

The building stands out with its monumental Renaissance facade and a typical Baroque main entrance in the middle. The entrance has twin pillars on each side and is decorated with Atlantid columns which are supporting the 1st floor balcony. On the inside of the main entrance nexus, it is divided by columns in three parts. Two great main stairways lead to the first floor of the building. Originally the building had arcades facing the inner courtyard but they were later walled up. The General Command building is considered one of the most significant and important examples of Baroque architecture in Croatia.

It was built on the orders of Prince Eugene of Savoy as Military Headquarters. From 1736 to 1786 it was the seat of the General Command. From 1736 to 1745 it was also the seat of the Kingdom of Slavonia administration.

== See also ==
- County Palace, Osijek
