= Suleiman Bridge =

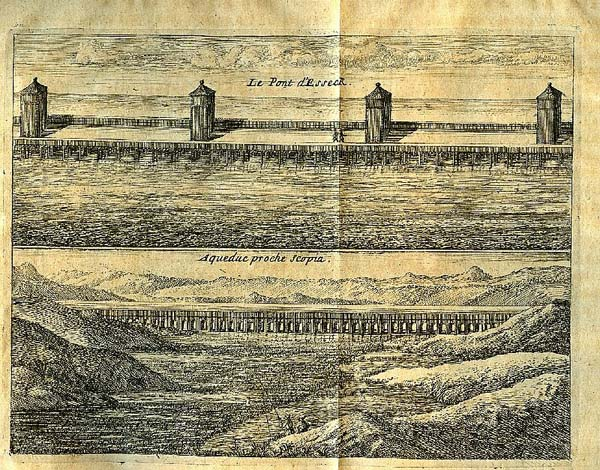
- A 1674 view of the Suleiman Bridge by Edward Brown
- Coordinates: 45°33′48″N 18°41′34″E

Characteristics
- Total length: 7 kilometres (4.3 mi)
- Width: 6 metres (20 ft)

History
- Designer: Mimar Sinan

Location
- Interactive map of Suleiman Bridge

The Suleiman Bridge (Croatian: Sulejmanov most) was a bridge in Osijek, over the Drava River in Slavonia, eastern Croatia. The bridge had an important role during the Ottoman–Habsburg wars, until it was finally burnt down in 1686.

== Construction ==
The traffic and strategic importance of Osijek was sustained during the Ottoman period, but Osijek was then internationally known because of the Suleiman the Magnificent Bridge.

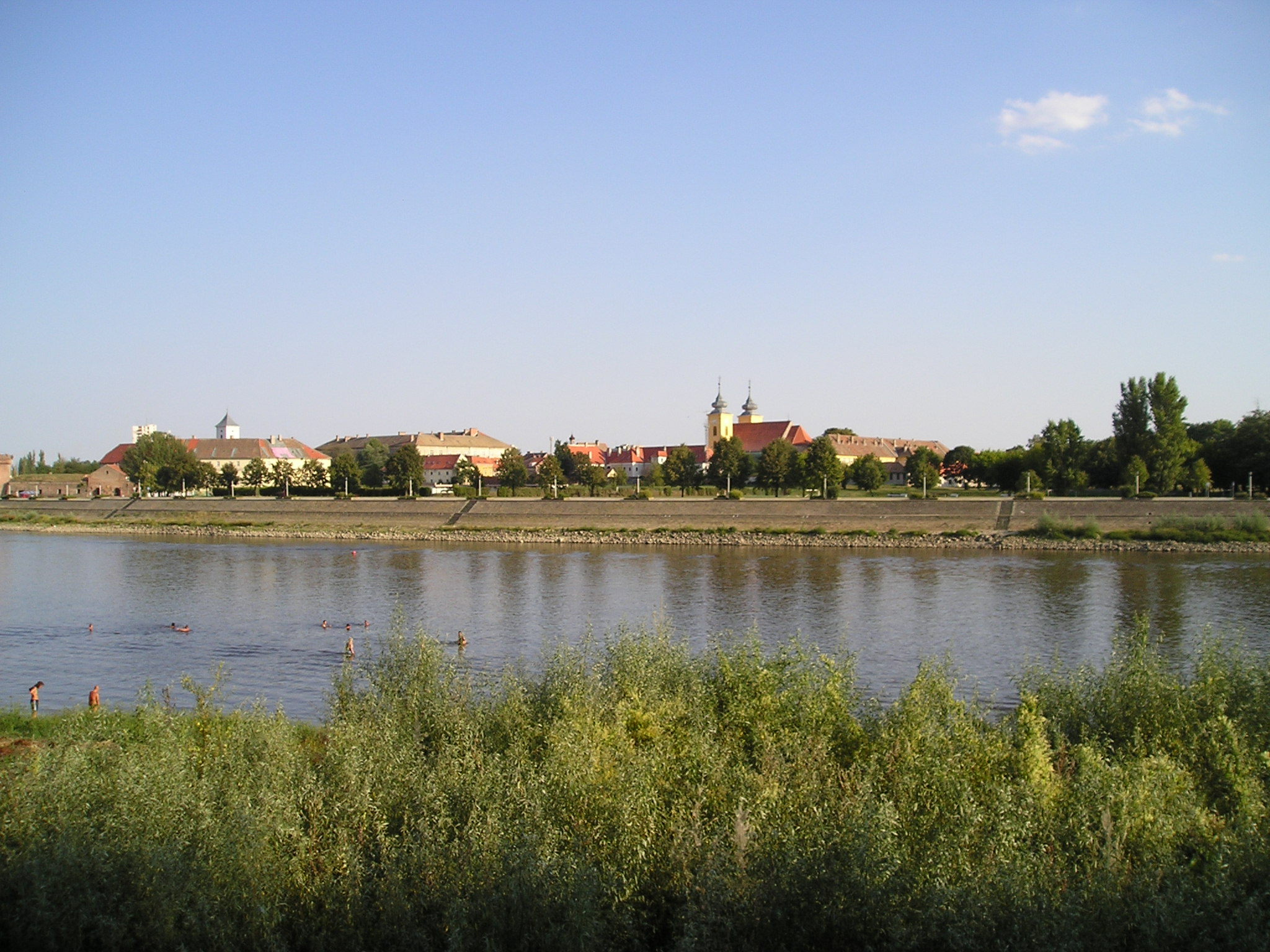
Tvrđa viewed from across the River Drava (possible location of the former Suleiman Bridge).

The construction of the bridge which connected Osijek and Darda, began by Pargalı Ibrahim Pasha on August 16, 1526 following the orders of Suleiman the Magnificent. The bridge was designed by Mimar Sinan, a military engineer who later became the sultan's chief architect. It took the form of a wooden road on piers and was approximately 7 kilometres (4.3 mi) long and 6 metres (20 ft) wide.

== Usage ==
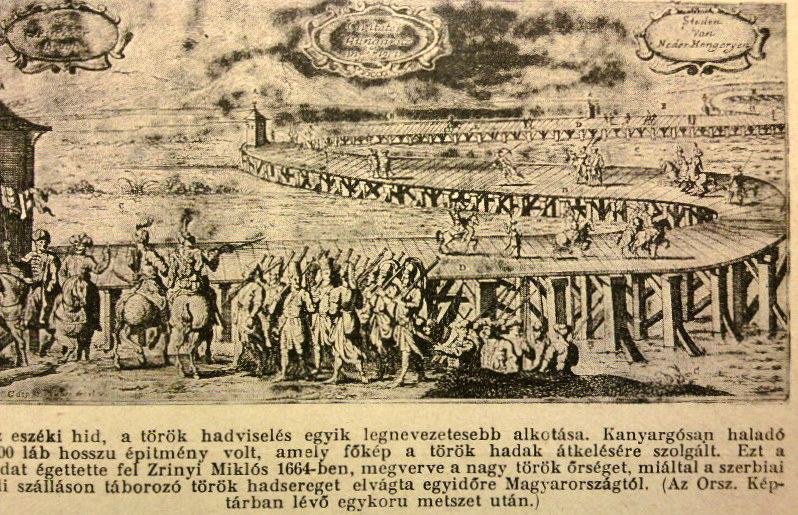
A fanciful view of the bridge from the Hungarian publication Tolna World History

The bridge had an important role during the Ottoman–Habsburg wars. After Suleiman crossed the river Drava at Osijek during his fifth imperial campaign in 1532, instead of taking the usual route for Vienna, he turned westwards into Ferdinand's held Hungarian territory.

The bridge was rebuilt during the rule of Suleiman II.

== Destruction ==
Seen as a great threat to Christian Europe, the bridge was attacked several times, being destroyed in 1664, when it was set on fire on the orders of the Croatian feudal lord Nicholas VII of Zrin (Croatian: Nikola VII. Zrinski, Hungarian: VII. Zrínyi Miklós). After being rebuilt, the bridge was finally burnt down by the Austrian army in 1686.

== See also ==
- Islam in Croatia
- Ottoman Hungary
- Gunja Mosque
- Ottoman Monuments of Ilok
