= Church of Saint Michael, Osijek =

Parish Church of Saint Michael
- Župna crkva svetog Mihaela
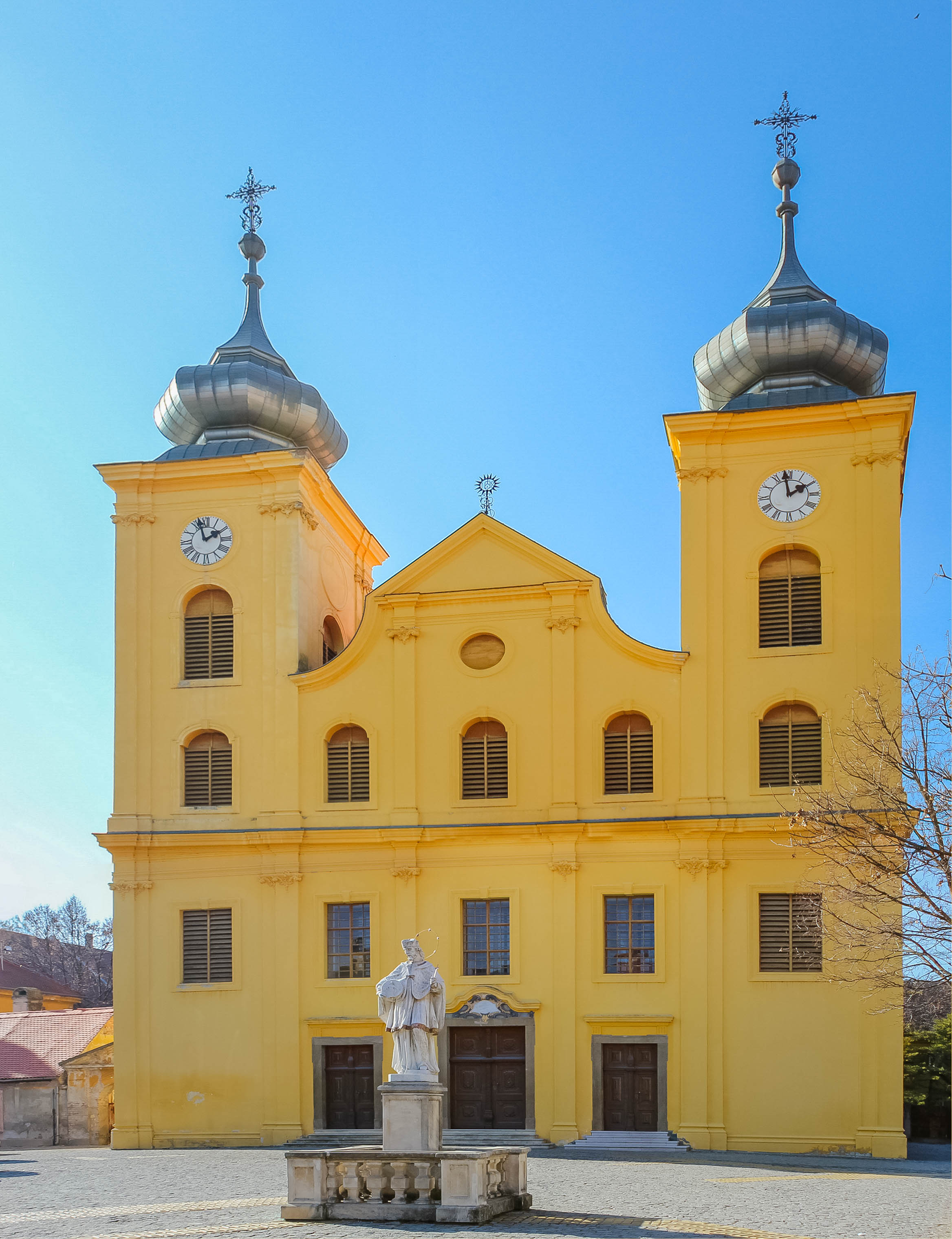
- Parish Church of Saint Michael
- 45°33′39″N 18°41′39″E
- Location: Osijek
- Country: Croatia
- Denomination: Roman Catholic

History
- Status: Parish church
- Dedication: Saint Michael
- Dedicated: 1750

Architecture
- Functional status: Active
- Style: Baroque
- Groundbreaking: 31 July 1725; 300 years ago
- Completed: 1768; 258 years ago

Specifications
- Length: 45 m (148 ft)
- Width: 25 m (82 ft)

Administration
- Metropolis: Metropolis of Đakovo-Osijek
- Archdiocese: Archdiocese of Đakovo-Osijek
- Deanery: Osijek Eastern Deanery
- Parish: Parish of Saint Michael - Osijek 2

The Church of Saint Michael (Croatian: Crkva svetog Mihaela) is a Roman Catholic church in Osijek, Croatia. It is located in Tvrđa.

== History ==
Jesuits laid the foundation stone on 31 July 1725 on the foundation of Kasimpaša mosque, which was built during Ottoman period in Osijek.

In 1734 the first Mass was held in the unfinished church. In 1750 the church was dedicated to Saint Michael. It was finished in 1768.

In 1991, during the Croatian War of Independence the church was damaged, but in 1999 it was renovated.

== Altars ==
Church have 7 altars, which were added over time:

- Altar of Saint Michael (main altar)
- Altar of Saint John Nepomuk (from 1764)
- Altar of Saint Otilia (from 1768)
- Altar of Blessed Virgin Mary (also called White altar)
- Altar of Holy Cross (also called Black altar)
- Altar of Blessed Mary Assistant
- Altar of Saint Teresa of Ávila
