= University of Slavonski Brod =

Educational institution in Croatia

- Sveučilište u Slavonskom Brodu
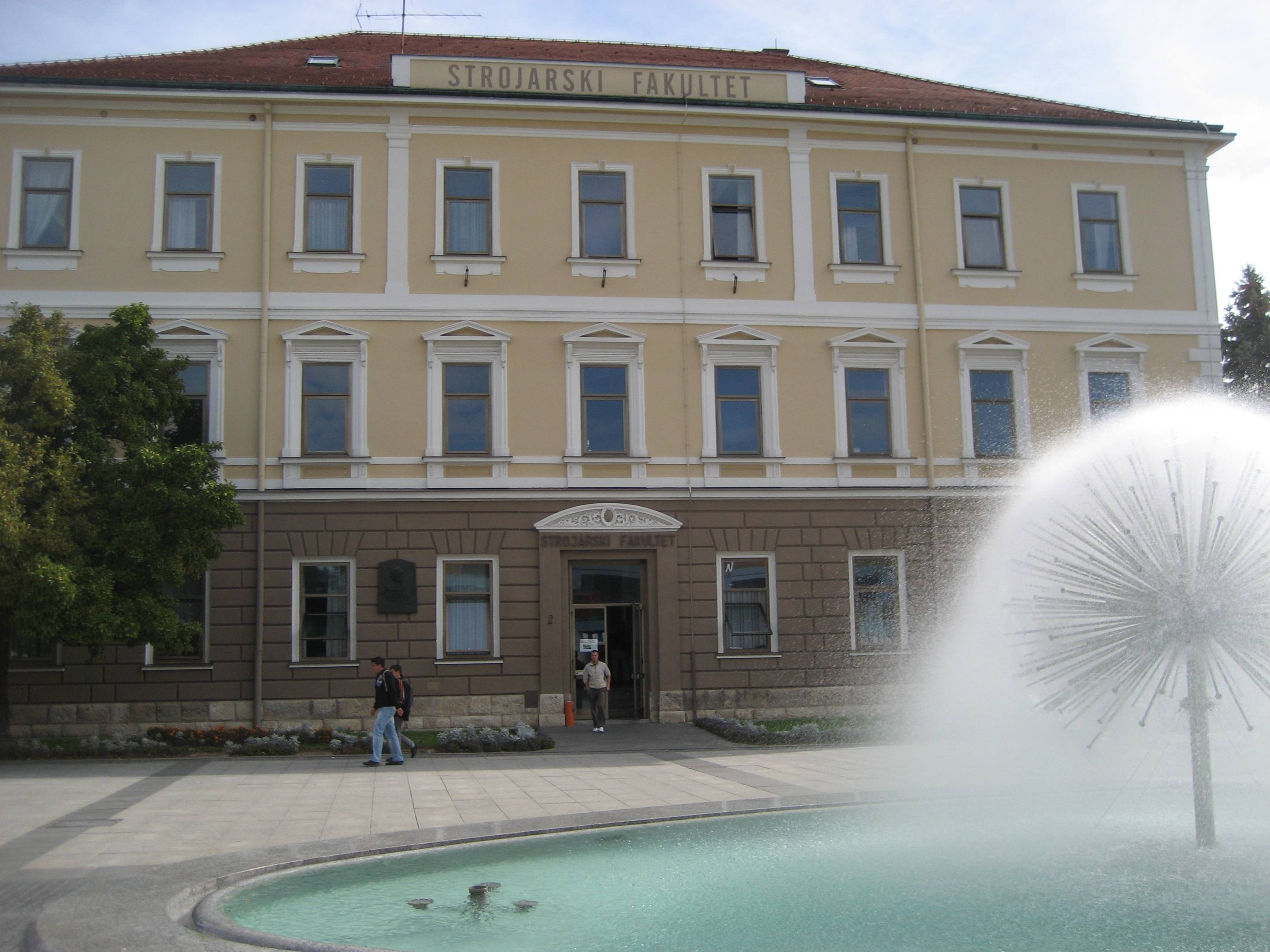
- Latin: Universitas Studiorum Marsoniensis
- Type: public university
- Established: 2020; 6 years ago
- Parent institution: University of Osijek
- Students: 2261
- Location: Slavonski Brod, Brod-Posavina, Croatia
Colors
Blue and gold
- Website: www.unisb.hr

The University of Slavonski Brod (Croatian: Sveučilište u Slavonskom Brodu, Latin: Universitas Studiorum Marsoniensis) is a public university in Slavonski Brod in Croatia. It is the ninth and the youngest Croatian university as well as the second university in Slavonia after the University of Osijek. Teaching at the university was initiated in 2020–2021 academic year.

== Establishment and subsequent events ==
Efforts to establish the university in Slavonski Brod were faced with initial challenges and opposition. Once the law on the establishment of the new institution was introduced in 2015 University of Osijek applied to the Constitutional Court of Croatia claiming that Croatian authorities violated the principle of academic freedom by the decision to extricate it's faculties in Slavonski Brod which together with local polytechnic constituted the basis for the new university. On 30 January 2018 the court decided not to take up the case in which it underlined that it is clearly up to the University of Osijek to freely decide to change or not to change the legal status of its faculties in Slavonski Brod. The Ministry stated that they do not question the right of the University of Osijek and that the new university in Slavonia Brod will gain legal personality only when and if University of Osijek decide to change the status of the faculties in question.

In 2022, the newly established university entered into a legal disagreement with the city of Slavonski Brod over the usage of buildings in the city ownership.

In 2024, the rector of the University Ivan Samardžić became embroiled in a scandal after allegedly pressuring a student witness to change their statement in favor of his son, who was injured in a fight. The student's father perceived this as a threat and filed a criminal complaint, with a recording of the conversation submitted to the police.
