= Pedestrian bridge (Osijek) =

Bridge over the Drava River in Osijek, Croatia

Pedestrian bridge Pješački most
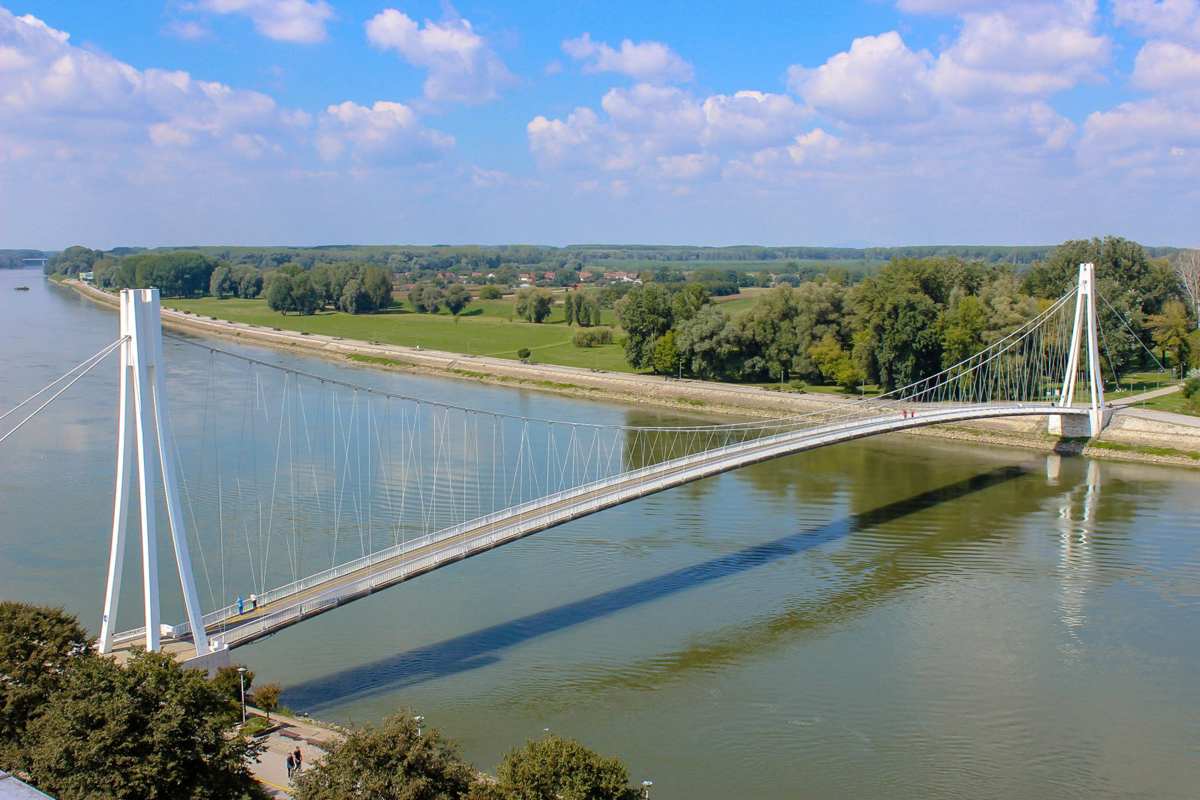
- Bridge from Promenada
- Coordinates: 45°33′49″N 18°41′7.5″E
- Crosses: Drava River
- Locale: Osijek, Croatia
- Followed by: Franjo Tuđman Bridge

Characteristics
- Total length: 210 m (689 ft)
- Height: 35 m (115 ft)

History
- Inaugurated: 1981; 45 years ago

Statistics
- Toll: no

Location
- Interactive map of Pedestrian bridge

The pedestrian bridge (Croatian: Pješački most) in Osijek, Croatia spans the Drava River. It is one of the most notable symbols of Osijek.

== History ==
The bridge was opened in 1981. It was designed by Mostgradnja, a Belgrade-based company.

From 1981 to 1991, the bridge was named "Youth Bridge" (Croatian: Most mladosti). In 1991, the bridge was renamed to current name. It was damaged in the Croatian War of Independence, during the Battle of Osijek, and underwent repair in 1993. In 2007, the bridge was completely renovated.

== Sources ==
- "Pješački most dobit će novi asfalt, boju i rasvjetu". osijek031.com (in Croatian). 10 January 2007.
