= Museum of Slavonia =

Museum in Osijek, Croatia

Coordinates: 45°33′36.5″N 18°41′48″E

- Muzej Slavonije

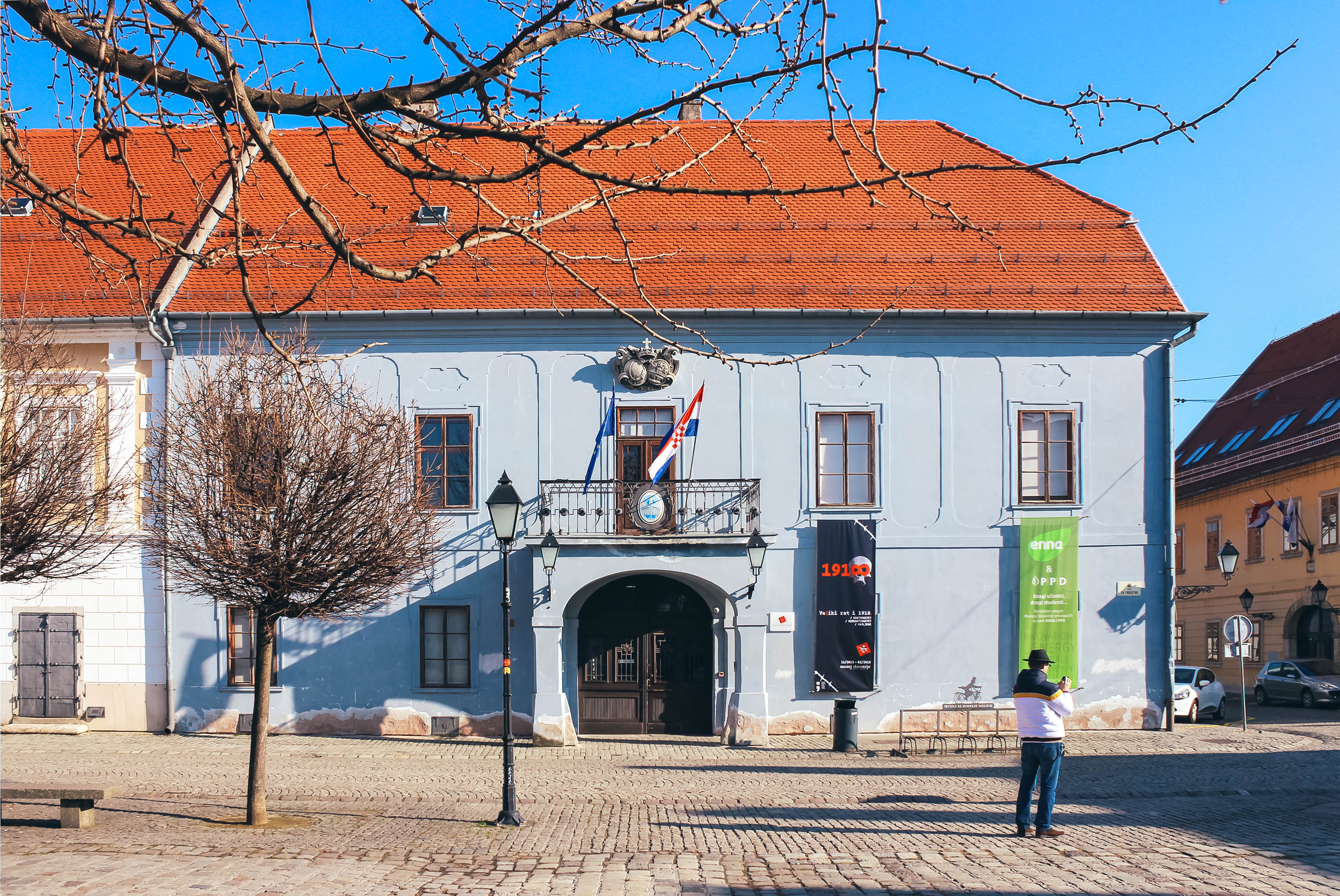
- Main building in Tvrđa
- Established: 1877; 149 years ago
- Location: Osijek, Croatia
- Visitors: 28,001 (2017)
- Director: Grgur Marko Ivanković
- Website: mso.hr

Museum of Slavonia (Croatian: Muzej Slavonije) is the largest general-type museum in Croatia. It is located in the Tvrđa district of Osijek.

== History ==
The Museum of Slavonia was established in 1877 in Osijek. Since 1946, it is located in the City Magistrate building, which was constructed in 1702, in a Baroque style for the purposes of the Vienna Chamber, town government and police. Today, among the museums numerous collections, spanning various fields, including natural history, archaeology, numismatics, history, arts and crafts, ethnography, and technical sciences, the most prized are the Roman Mursa and numismatic collections. The museum holds a total of 300,000 items, which are split between 116 collections. The Museum's library contains more than 70,000 books, the largest museum library in Croatia. The museum briefly merged with the Archaeological Museum between 2012 and 2017, before the institution again became a separate entity. The museum does not host a permanent exhibition, but hosts a number of temporary exhibitions, across 6 locations across the city.

The museum has won a number of awards, including the Pavao Ritter Vitezović Award for advancing museum activities in 1987.

The museum participates in initiatives such as European Museum Night and International Museum Day.

== See also ==
- List of museums in Croatia
