= I Gymnasium Osijek =

Public high school in Osijek, Croatia

- I. gimnazija Osijek
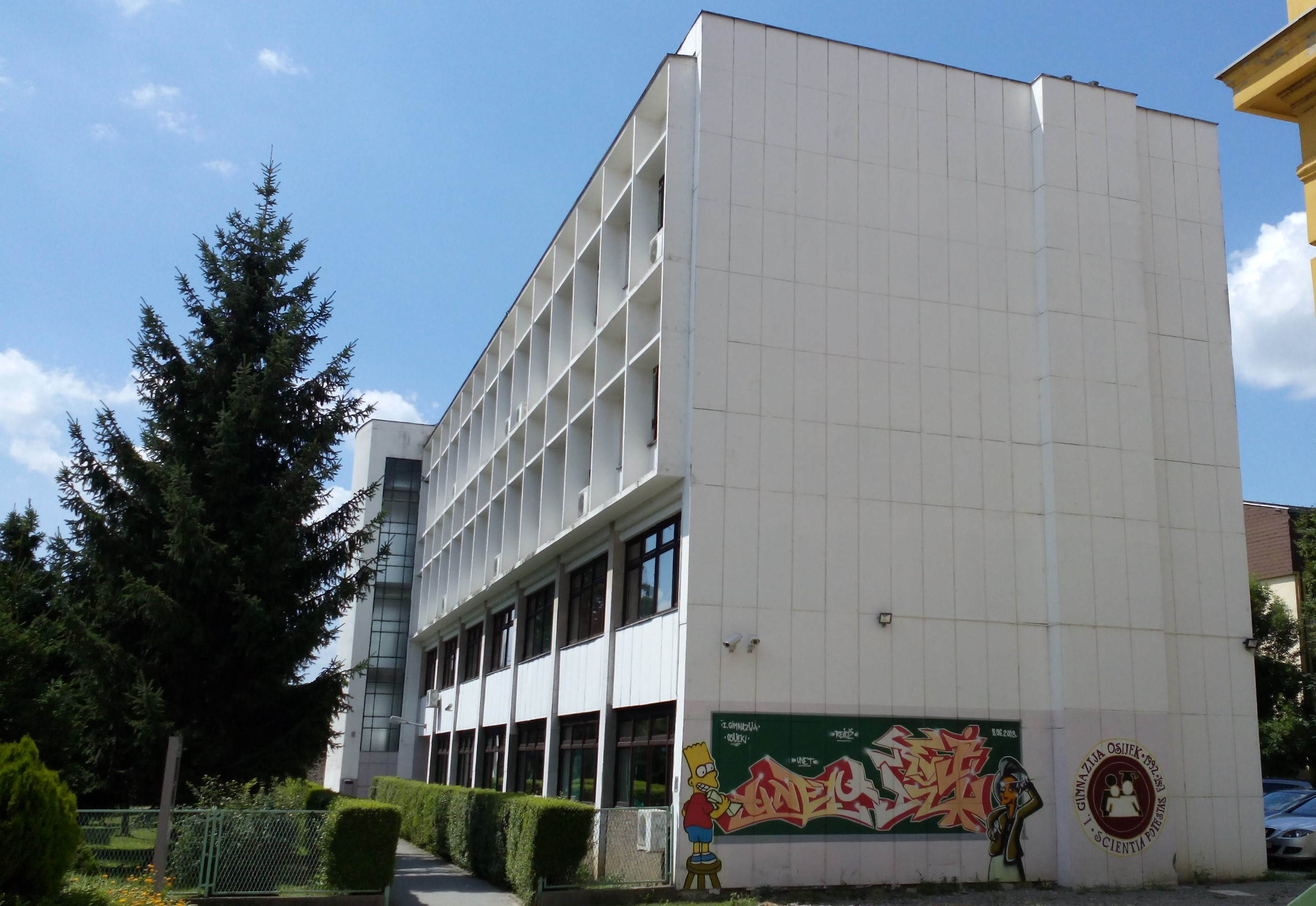

Location
- Županijska 4; 31000 Osijek; Croatia
- Coordinates: 45°33′33.4″N 18°40′31.1″E

Information
- School type: Public
- Established: 1 September 1992; 33 years ago
- Headmaster: Dražen Đapić
- Language: Croatian
- Classrooms: 11
- Website: www.gimnazija-prva-os.skole.hr

I Gymnasium Osijek (Croatian: I. gimnazija Osijek) is a high school in Osijek, Croatia.

== History ==
The school was established on 1 September 1992, when Assembly of Osijek Municipality reorganized Center for vocational education "Ribar Brothers" (Croatian: Centar za usmjereno obrazovanje "Braća Ribar").

From school year of 1991-92 till 1999-00 in school was realized part of program of general gymnasium for students of Franjo Kuhač Music School.

== Alumni ==
After the school year 2023/24, 114 graduates of this gymnasium enrolled at an institution of higher learning in Croatia, or 91.94% of students who took up the nationwide Matura exams. The most common destinations for these students were the University of Osijek faculties of economics, civil engineering and architecture, humanities and social sciences, law, and electrical engineering, computing and IT.
