= Ante Starčević Square =

City square in Osijek, Croatia

Coordinates: 45°33′41″N 18°40′37″E

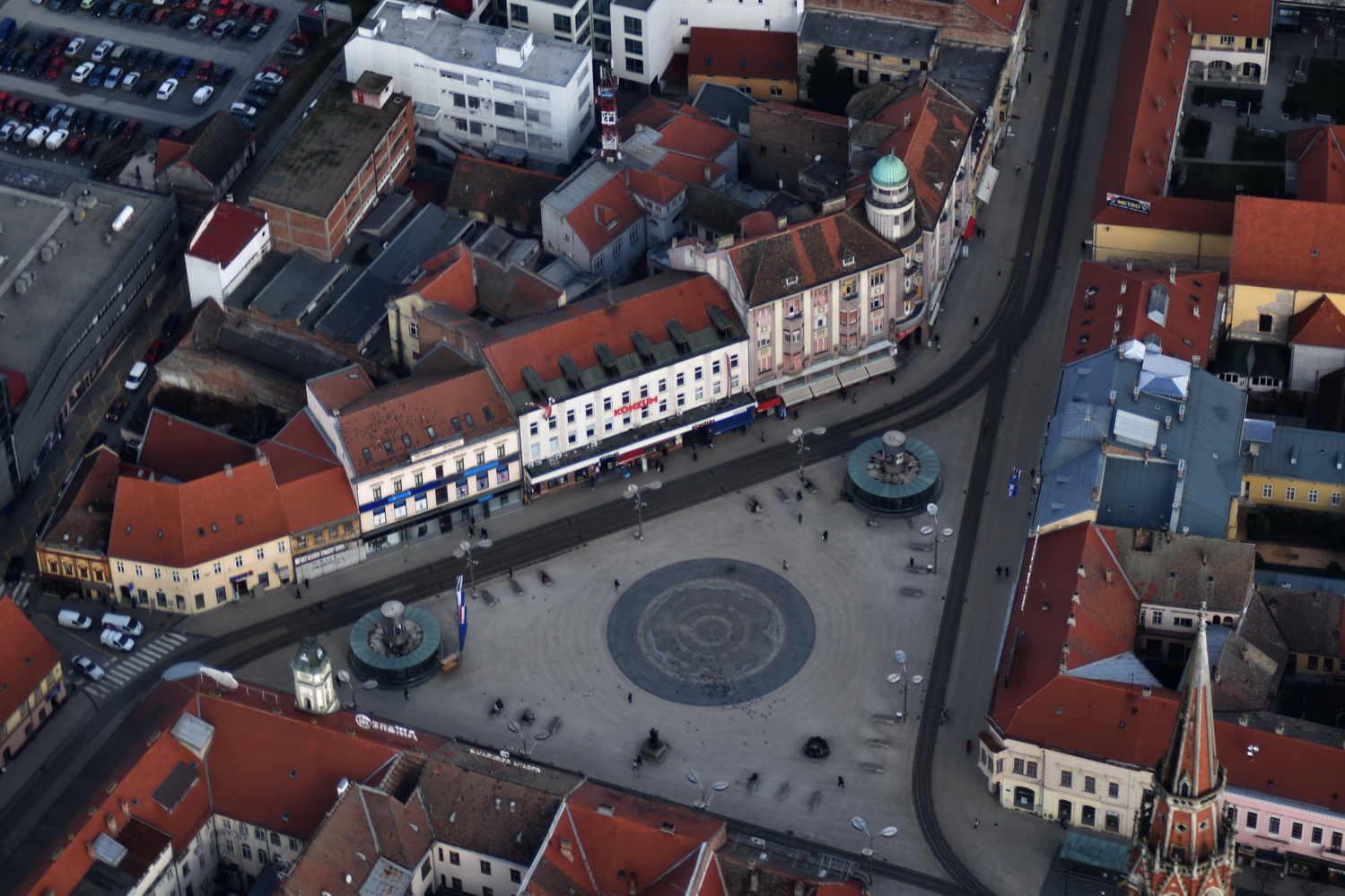
Aerial view of the Square

Ante Starčević Square (Croatian: Trg Ante Starčevića) is the central square of the city of Osijek, Croatia, named for the Croatian writer and politician Ante Starčević. It is colloquially referred to as Trg ("the square"). It has the shape of an isosceles right triangle.

It is located in the center of Osijek on the intersection of Josip Juraj Strossmayer Street from the west, the small street Ribarska from the north, Kapucinska Street from the east and Županijska Street from the south.

Notable buildings on the square include the Normann Palace (the seat of government of Osijek-Baranja County), and the Hotel Central.
