= III Gymnasium Osijek =

Public high school in Osijek, Croatia

- III. gimnazija Osijek
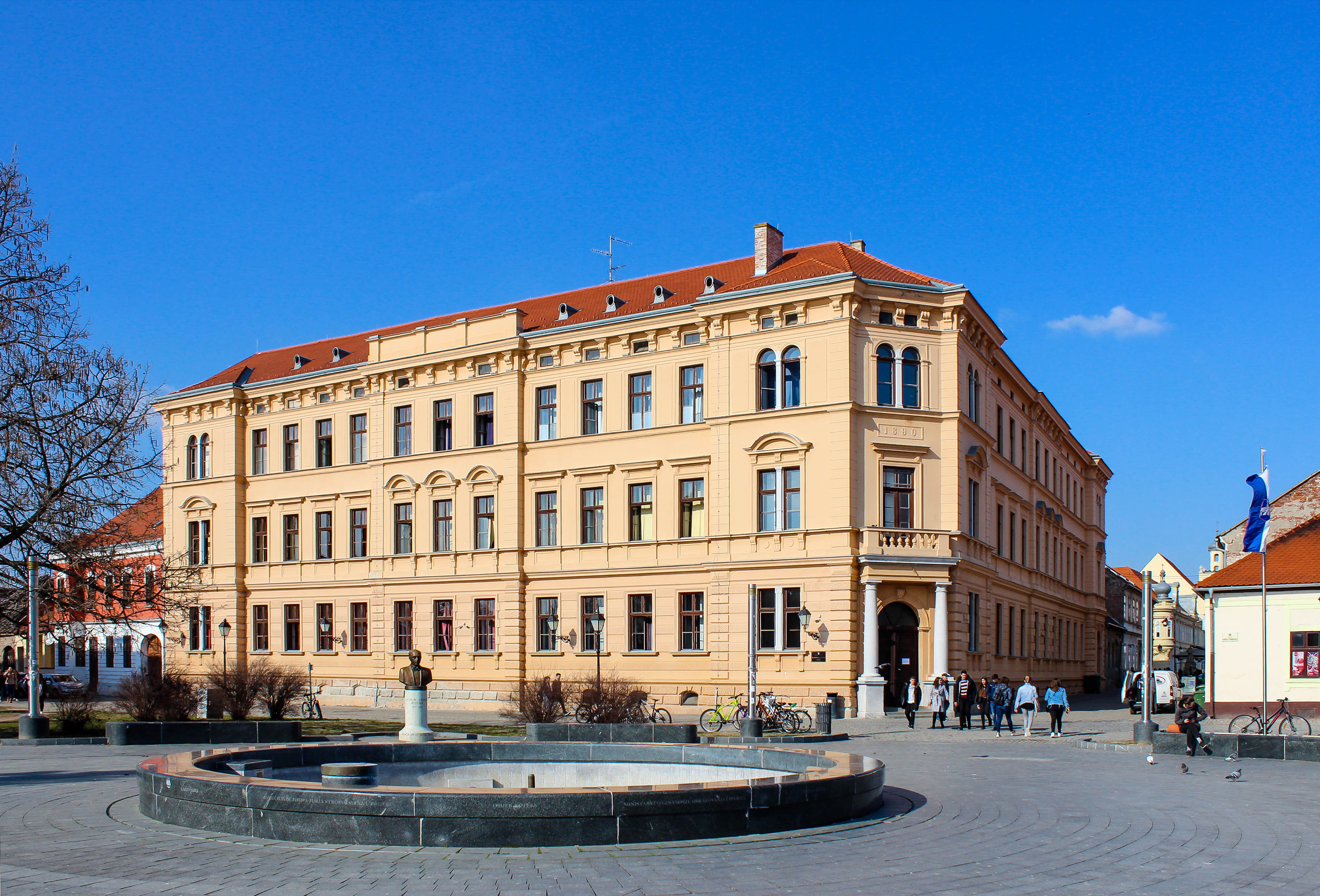
- III Gymnasium Osijek front entrance

Location
- Kamila Firingera 14; 31000 Osijek; Croatia
- Coordinates: 45°33′34.4″N 18°41′41.1″E

Information
- School type: Public
- Opened: 1870
- Headmaster: Dražen Jakopović
- Language: Croatian
- Website: www.gimnazija-treca-os.skole.hr

III Gymnasium Osijek (Croatian: III. gimnazija Osijek) is a high school in Osijek, Croatia.

While historical Jesuit schools were first started in the city in 1729, the school traces its roots to the Real Gymnasium (a Realgymnasium under Austrian administration) that was created between 1870 and 1890, and later morphed into different schools until the present day Third Gymnasium.

After the school year 2023/24, 130 graduates of this gymnasium enrolled at an institution of higher learning in Croatia, or 96.85% of students who took up the nationwide Matura exams. The most common destinations for these students were the University of Osijek faculties of medicine, electrical engineering, computing and IT, applied mathematics and informatics, as well as the University of Rijeka faculty of medicine and the University of Zagreb faculty of electrical engineering and computing.
