= II Gymnasium Osijek =

Public high school in Osijek, Croatia

Second Gymnasium Osijek II. gimnazija Osijek
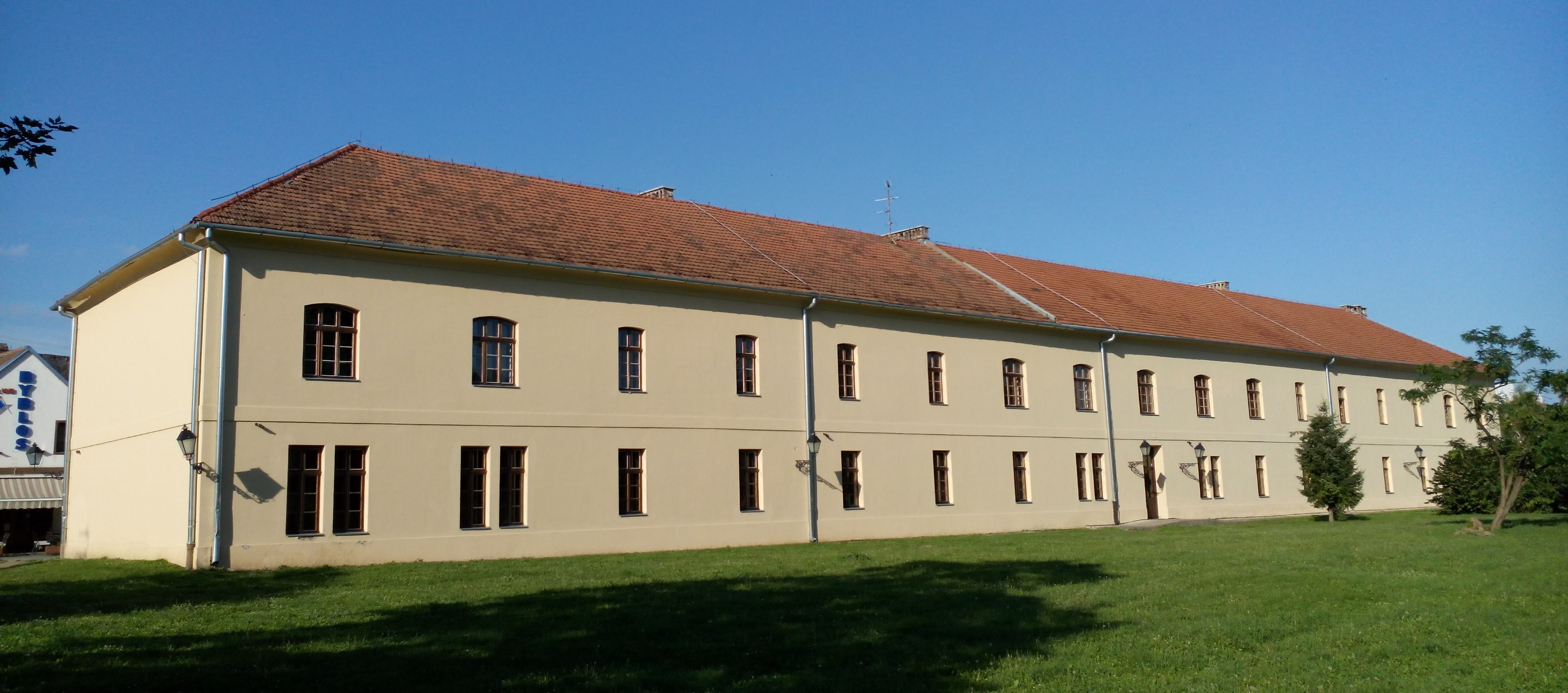

Address
- Ulica Kamila Firingera 5 HR-31000 Osijek; Croatia
- Coordinates: 45.55965°N 18.69354°E

Information
- Former names: Provisional Girls Lyceum/Girls Real Gymnasium (1917–20); Royal Girls Real Gymnasium and Senior Girls Lyceum (1920–23); Royal Girls Real Gymnasium (1923–25); State Girls Real Gymnasium (1925–45); Second Gymnasium (girls) (1945–55); Second Gymnasium (1955–57); Sara Bertić Gymnasium (1957–77); Ribar Brothers Center for Directed Education (1977–92)
- School type: Public, Gymnasium
- Established: 1917; 108 years ago
- Director: Vladimir Minarik
- Secondary years taught: 9–12
- Capacity: 520
  - Grade 9: 130 (2020–21)
- Language: Croatian
- Website: Official website (in Croatian)
- Last updated: December 4, 2021

Second Gymnasium Osijek (Croatian: II. gimnazija Osijek) is a high school in Osijek, Croatia.

After the school year 2023/24, 123 graduates of this gymnasium enrolled at an institution of higher learning in Croatia, or 96.85% of students who took up the nationwide Matura exams. The most common destinations for these students were the University of Osijek faculties of humanities and social sciences, education sciences, economics, academy of arts, and electrical engineering, computing and IT.
