= List of museums in Croatia =

Museums in Croatia

Croatia is home to a rich and diverse museum scene, with over 200 institutions scattered across the country, showcasing its history, culture, and art. In 2018, Croatia saw record visits to the museums across country, with over 5,4 million visitors. The oldest museum, the Archaeological Museum in Split, dates back to 1820, while the capital, Zagreb, has the highest number of museums (54), offering everything from contemporary art to historical exhibitions. Cities followed with museum numbers are, Split (18), Dubrovnik (16), Rijeka (5) and Osijek (4).

== Zagreb ==
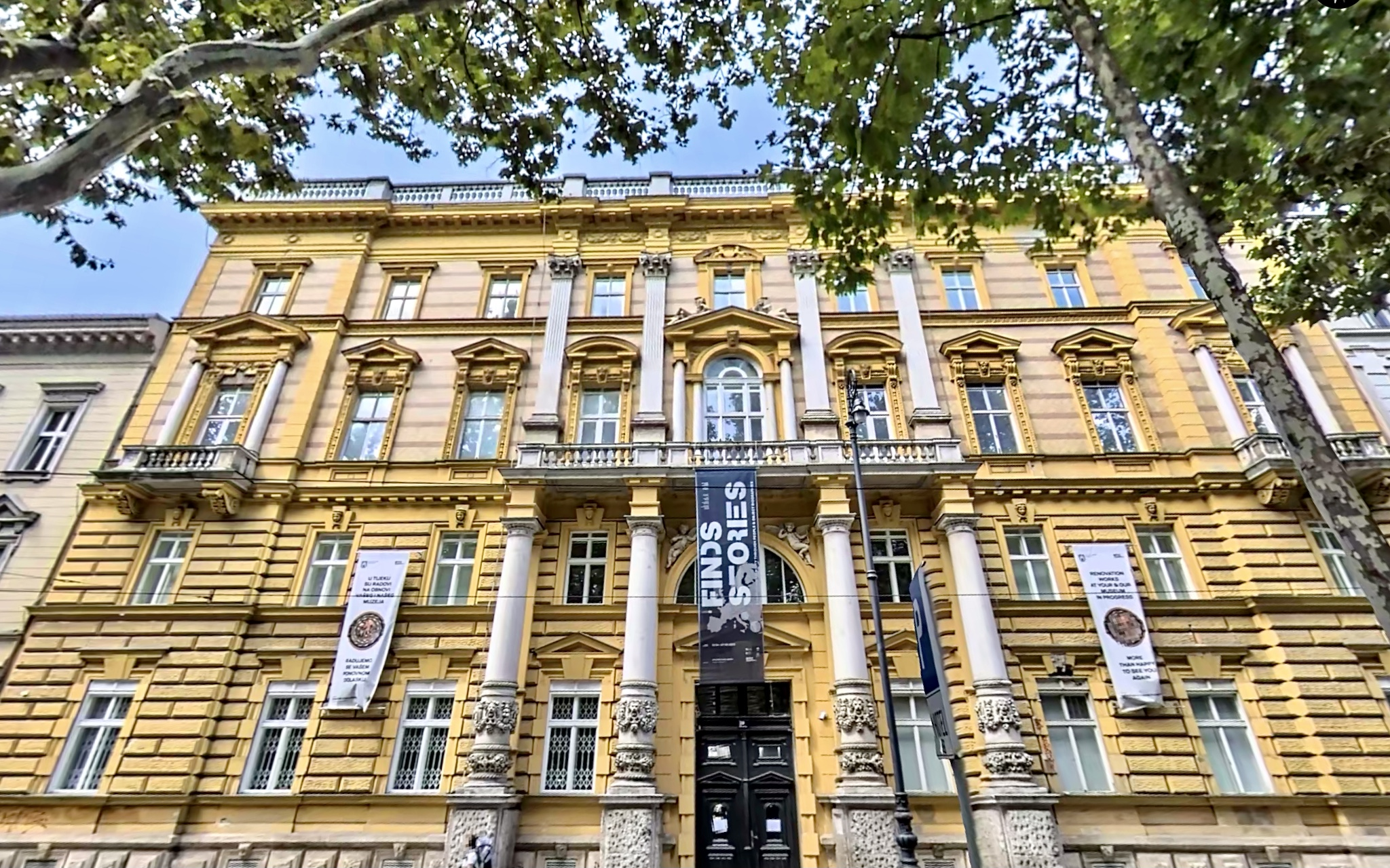
Archaeological Museum

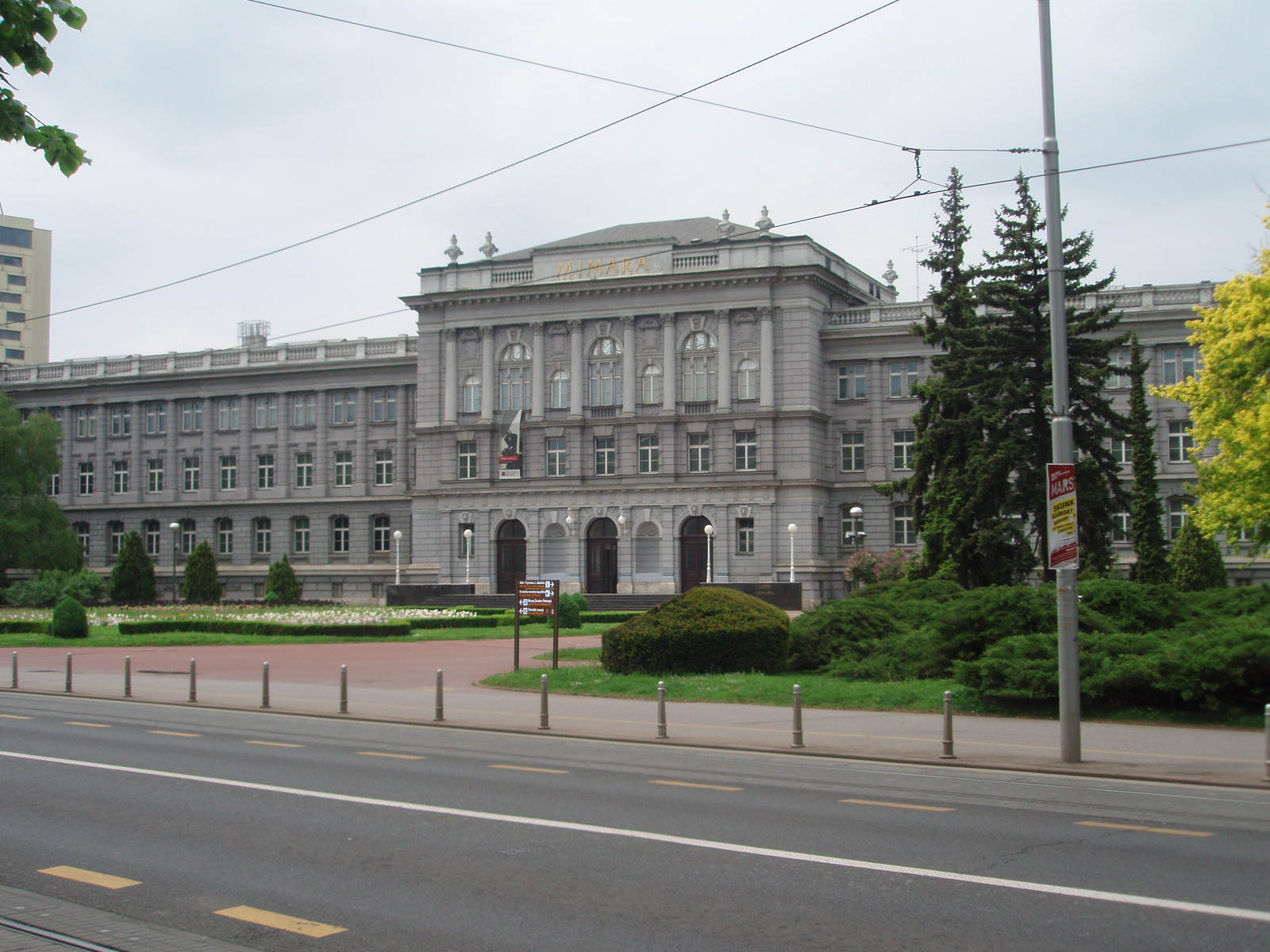
Mimara Museum

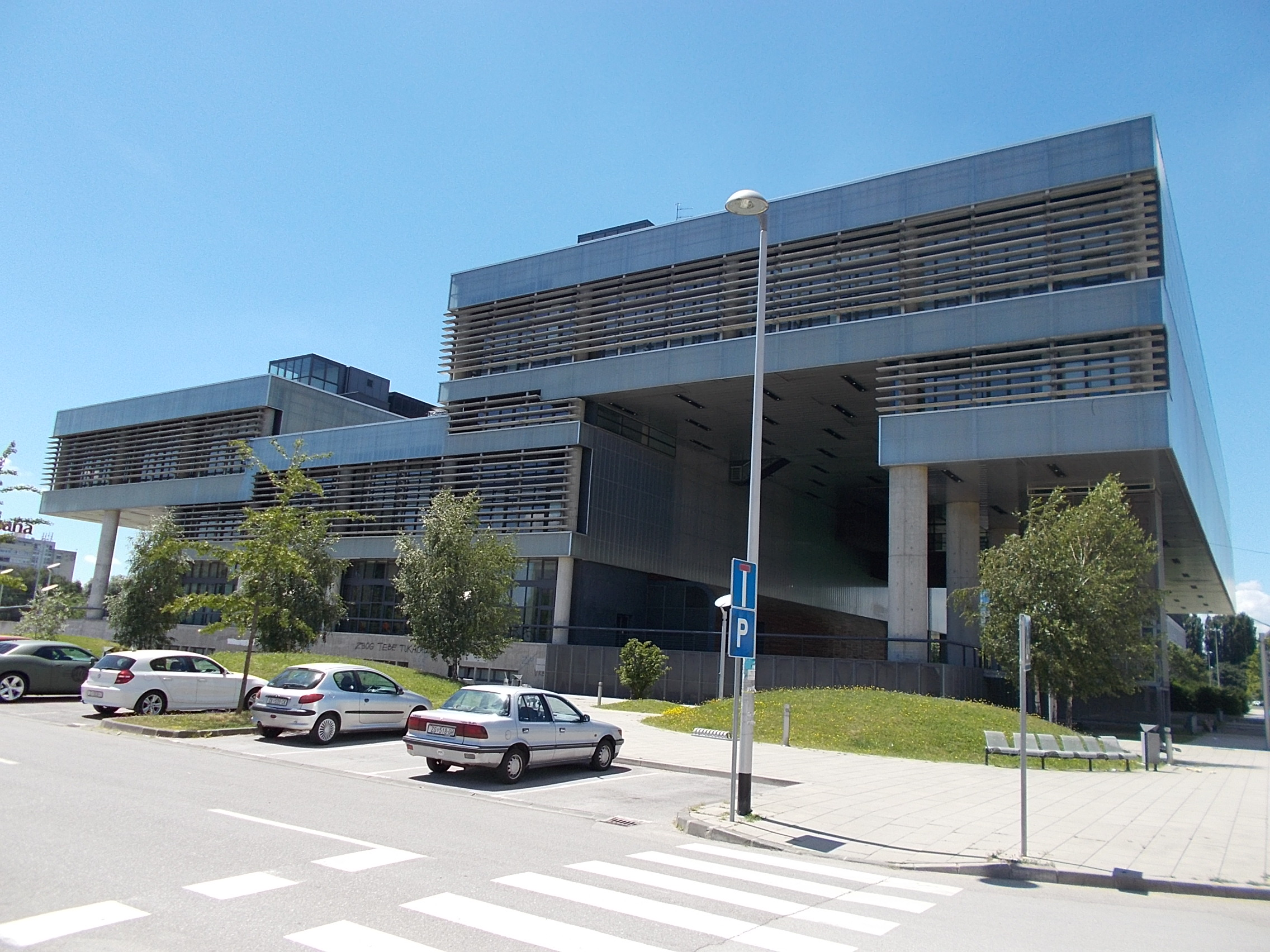
Museum of Contemporary Art

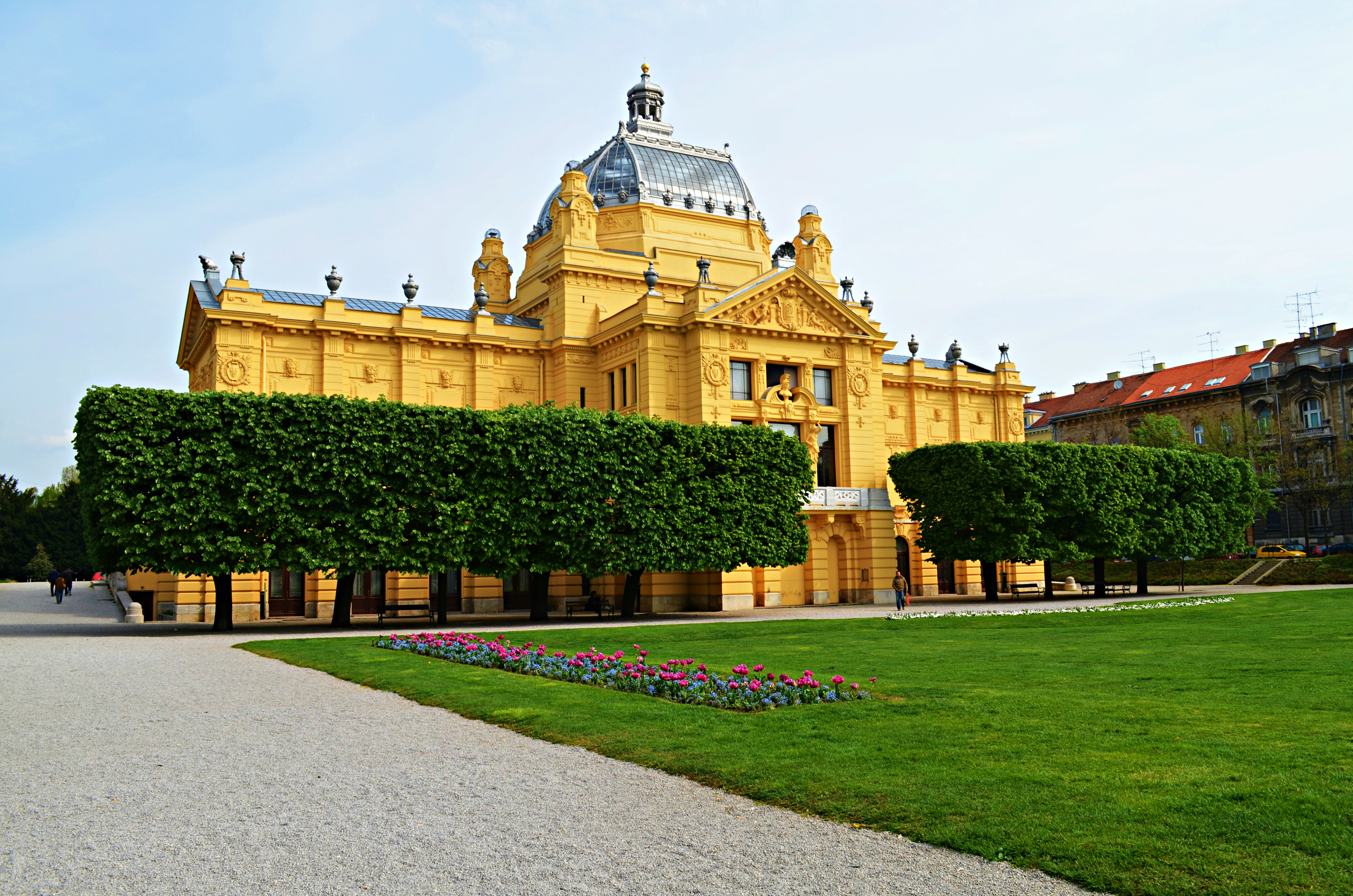
Art Pavillion

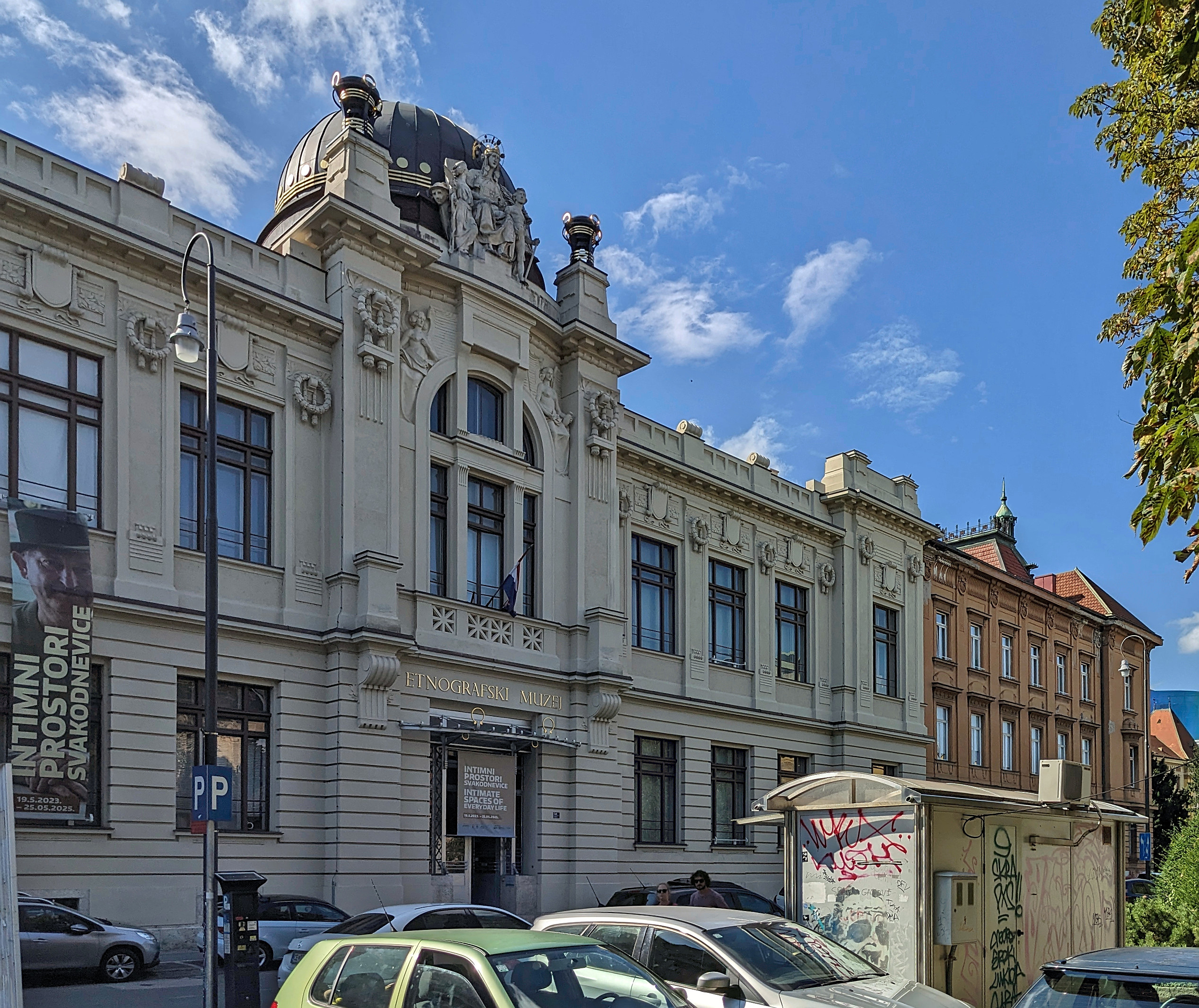
Ethnographic Museum, Zagreb

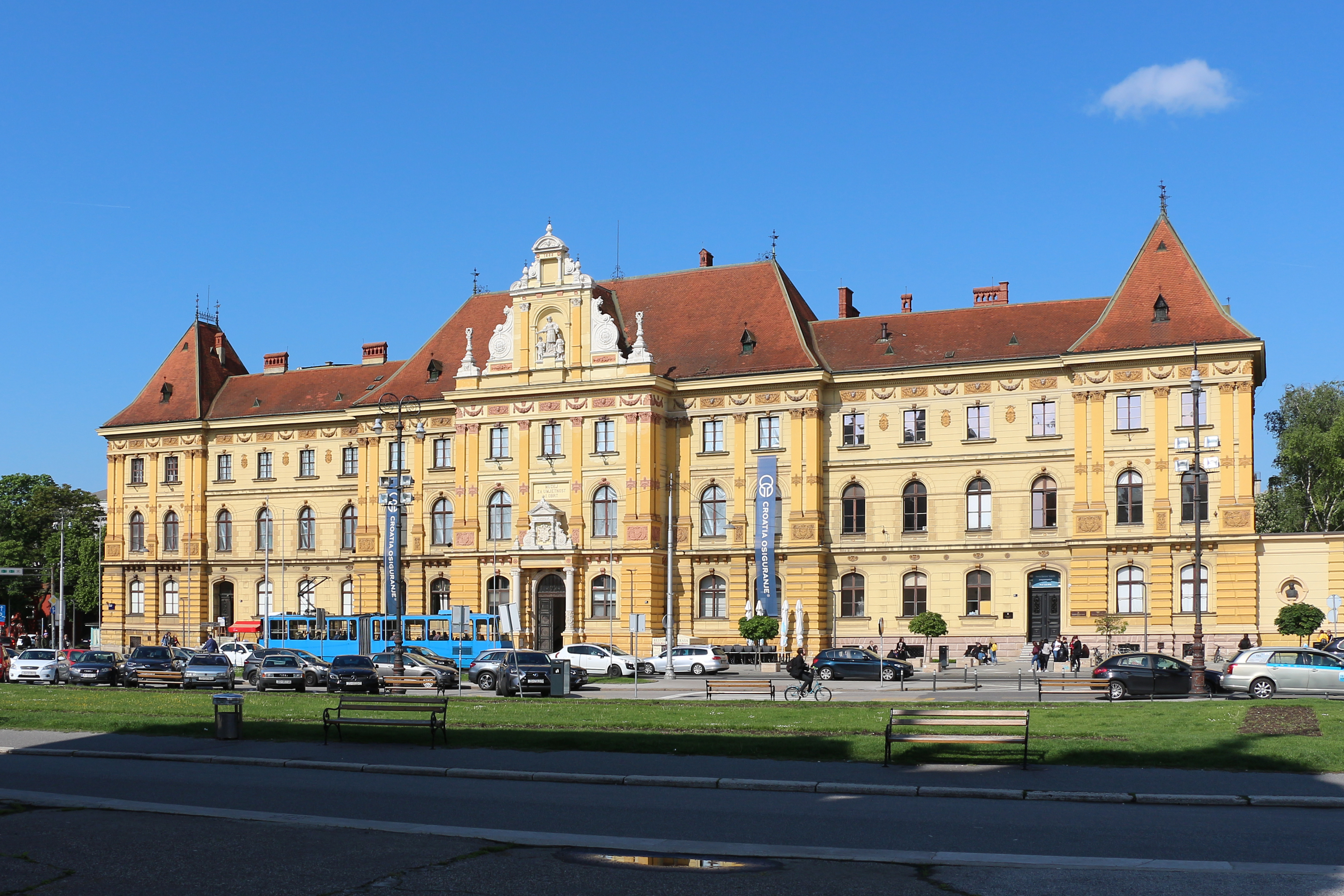
Arts and Crafts Museum

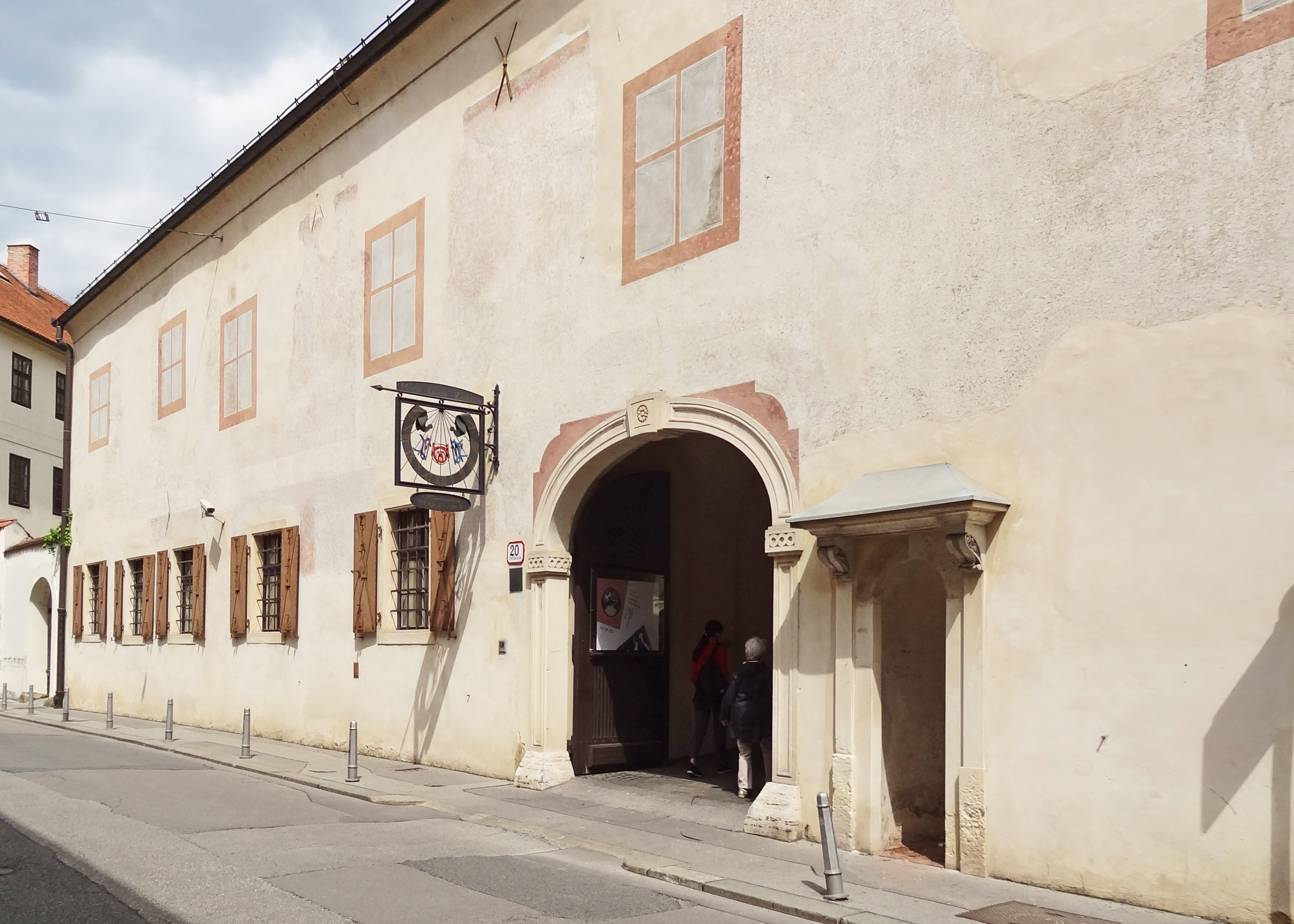
Zagreb City Museum

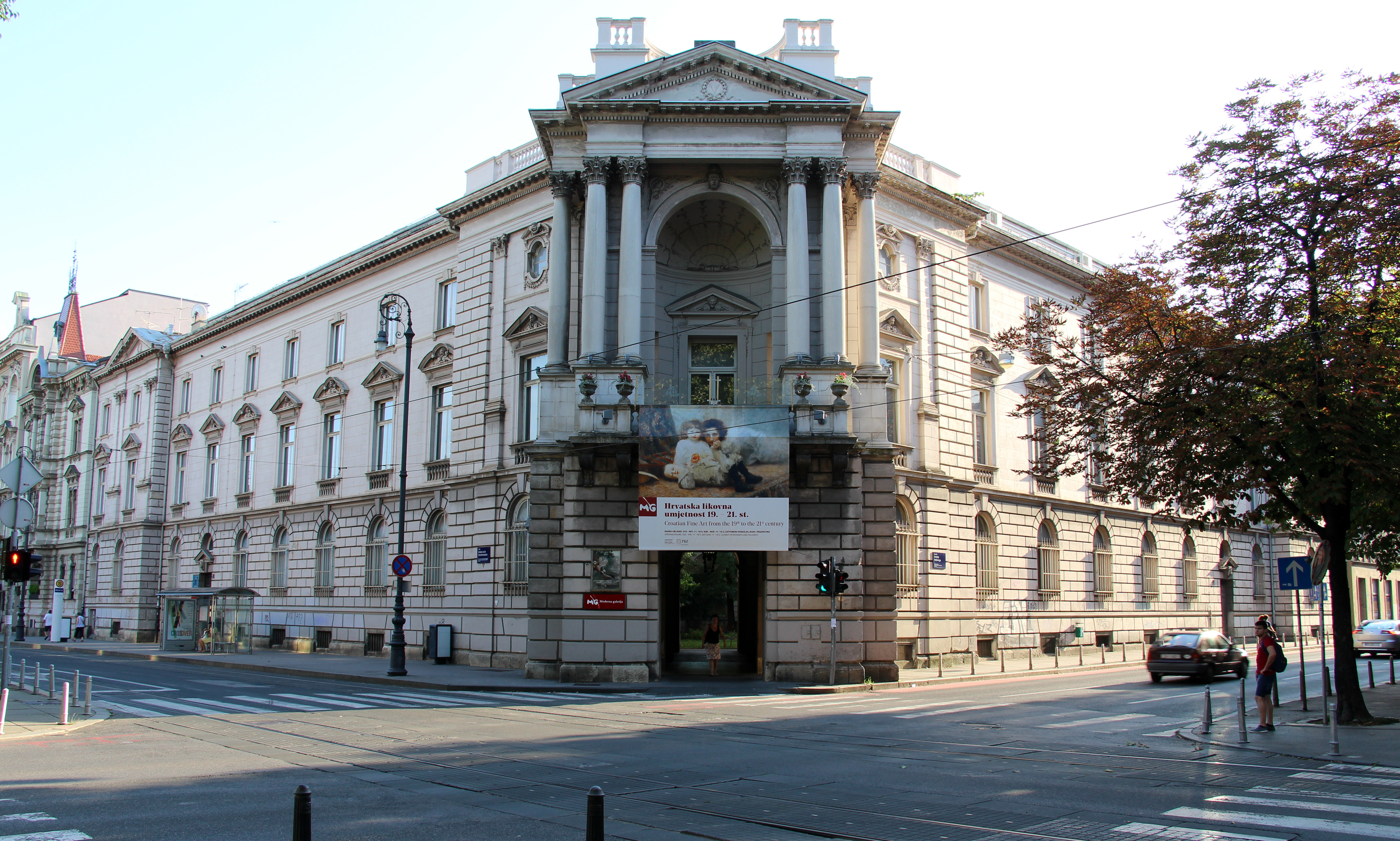
Modern Gallery

Museums in Zagreb:

- Archaeological Museum
- Antimuseum Bus
- Croatian History Museum
- Croatian Hunting Museum
- Croatian Museum of Telecommunications and Post
- Croatian Natural History Museum
- Croatian Railway Museum
- Croatian State Archives
- Cannabis Museum
- Chocolate Museum
- Cortugli Business Museum
- Cravaticum Museum
- Hrvatski muzej arhitekture HAZU
- Hrvatski školski muzej
- Hrvatski športski muzej
- Ethnographic Museum
- Ferdinand Budicki Automobile Museum
- History of video games Museum
- Hangover Museum
- HaHaHouse Museum
- Židovski muzej u Zagrebu
- Memorial Centre of Bombing of Zagreb 1991/1995
- Muzejski dokumentacijski centar
- Moneterra - Museum of Money currency
- Museum of Arts and Crafts
- Museum of blessed Aloysius Stepinac
- Museum of Broken Relationships
- Museum of Contemporary Art
- Museum of Forgotten Stories
- Museum of Franjo Schneider
- Museum of Illusions
- Košarkaški centar Dražen Petrović
- Museum of Unfinished Art
- Museum of New Wave
- Museum of Prigorje
- Museum of Selfies and Memories
- Museum of Serbian Orthodox Church
- Museum of Trešnjevka neighbourhood
- Mushroom Museum
- Nikola Tesla Technical Museum
- Muzej policije
- Sacral Museum
- Tiflološki muzej
- Travel Museum
- Muzej putovanja u Zagrebu
- Zagreb City Museum
- Zagreb 80s Museum

Art galleries in Zagreb:

- Art Pavilion
- HAZU Glyptotheque
- Institute for Contemporary Art
- Klovićevi dvori
- Lauba
- Meštrović Atelier
- Meštrović Pavilion
- Galerija Miroslav Kraljević
- Mimara Museum
- Modern Gallery
- Strossmayer Gallery of Old Masters

== Split ==
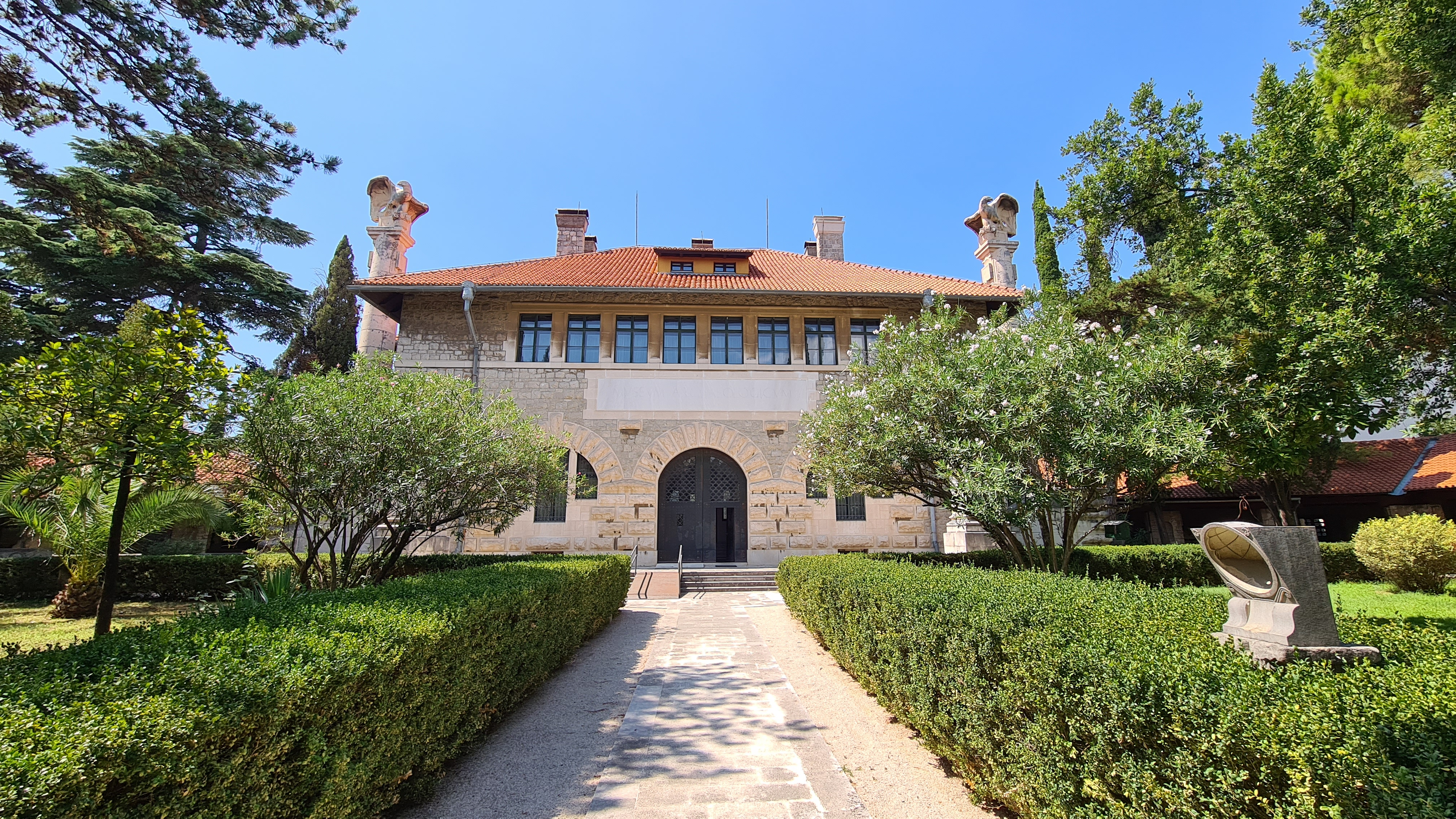
Archaeological Museum

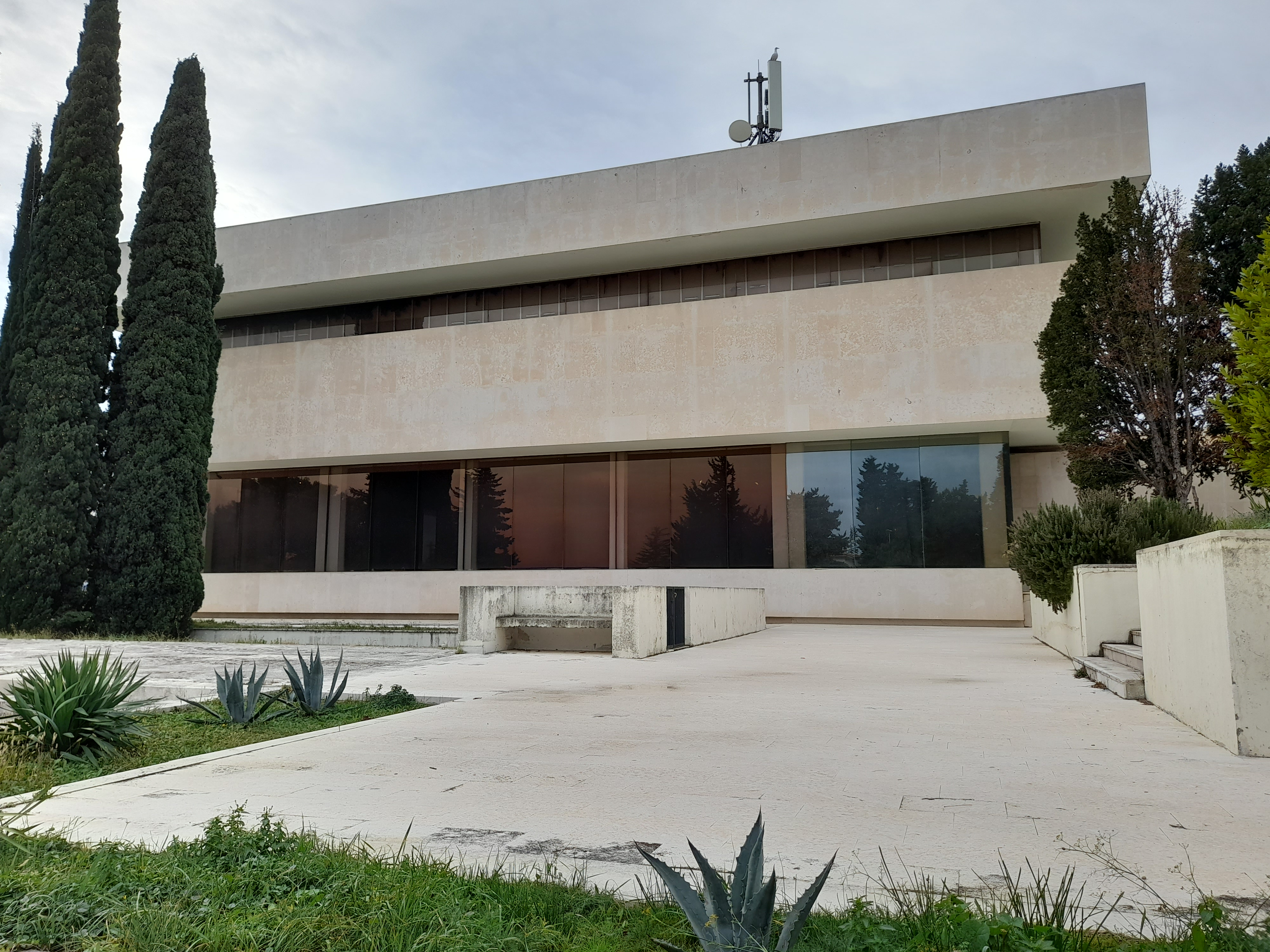
Museum of Croatian Archaeological Monuments

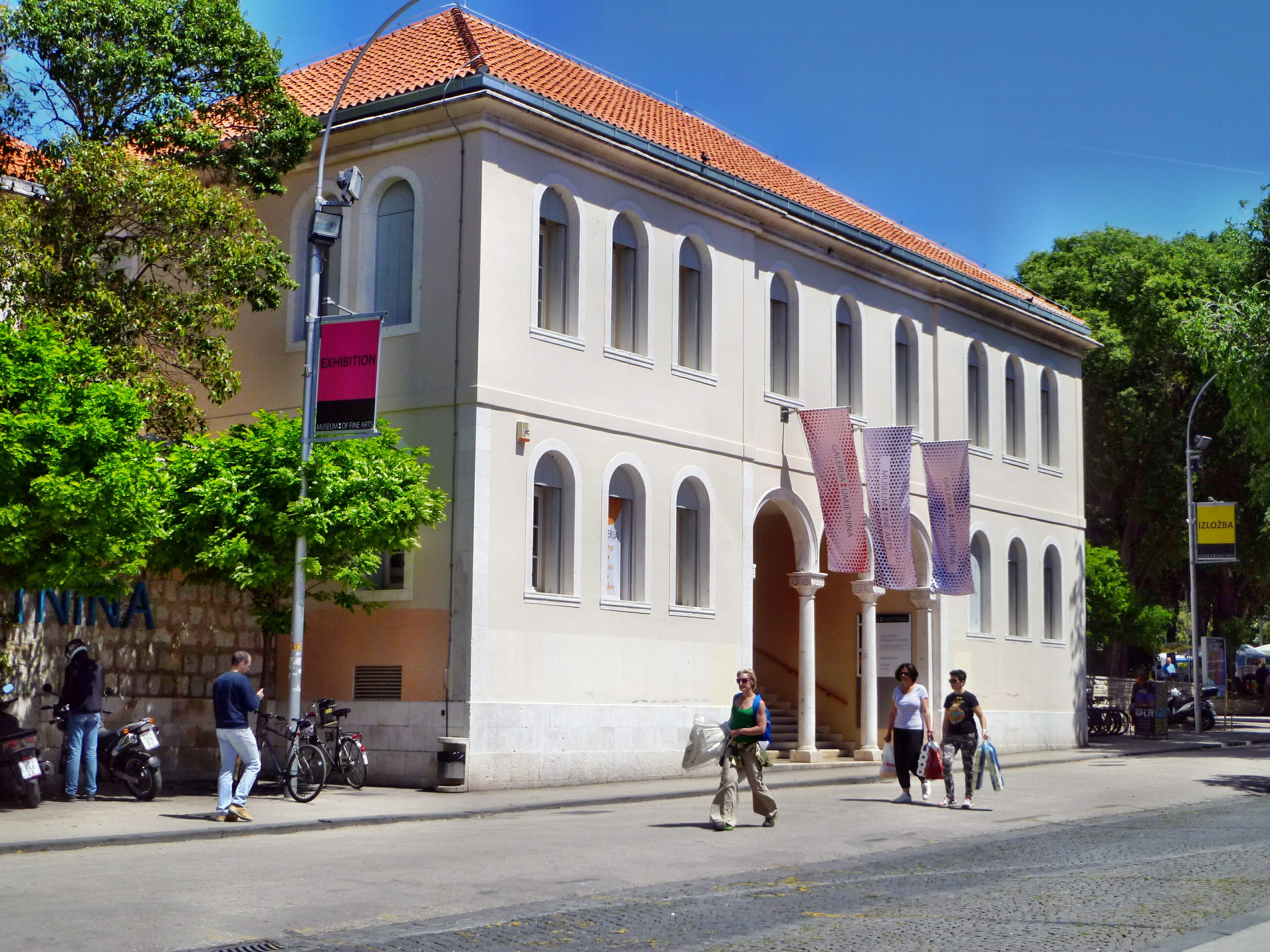
Gallery of Fine Arts

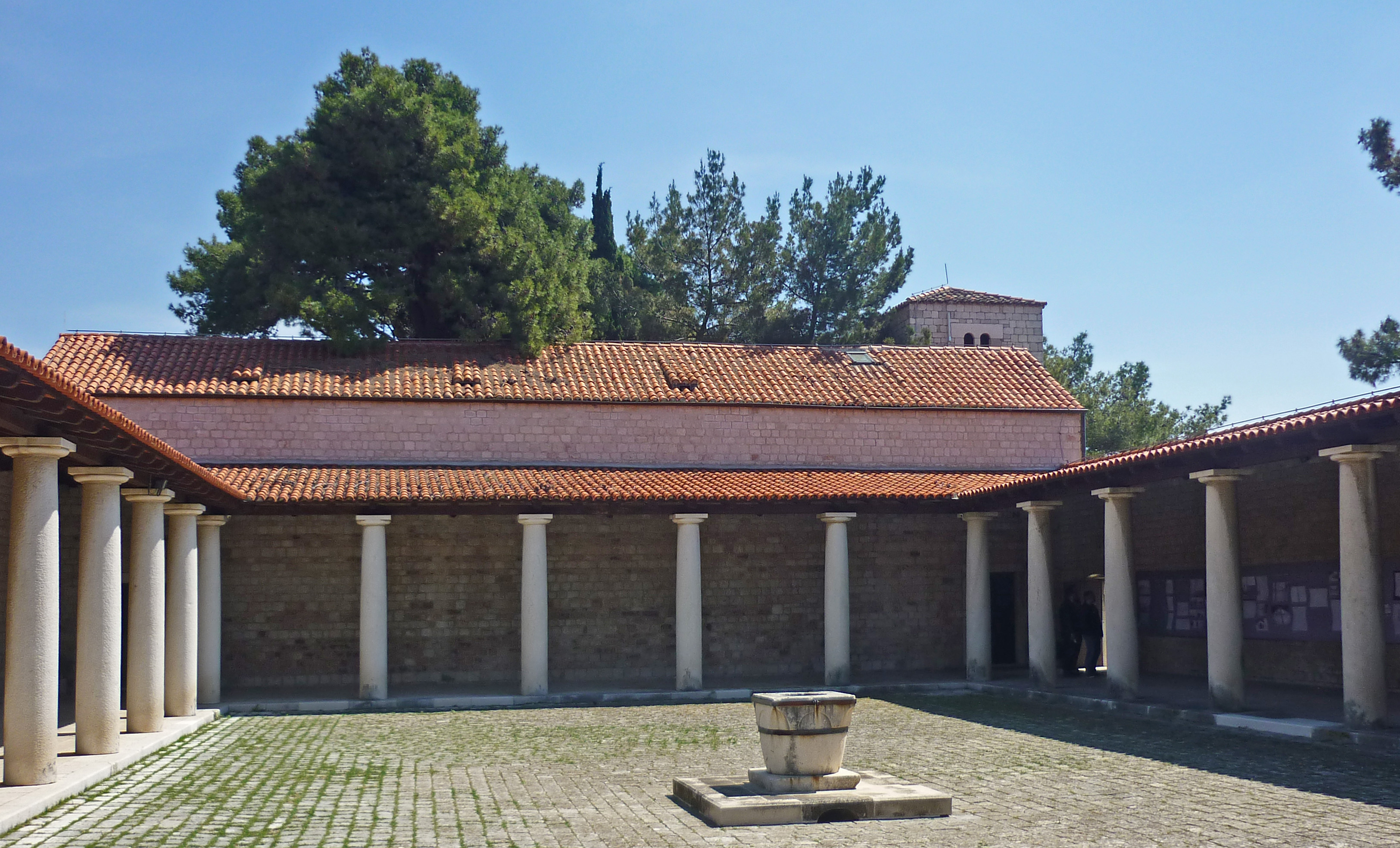
Ivan Meštrović Gallery

List of Museums and Galleries in Split:

- Archaeological Museum
- Archaeological collection of ancient Salona
- Croatian Maritime Museum
- Etnografski muzej Split
- Diocletian's Palace
- Etnographic Museum
- Froggyland
- Gallery of Fine Arts
- Gallery of Croatian sacred art Laudato
- Gallery of Vinko Draganja, of the Dominican monastery in Split
- Game of Thrones Museum
- Homeland War Museum
- Ivan Meštrović Gallery
- Museum of Illusions
- Museum in the church of St. Francis
- Museum of Sacred Art
- Museum of Croatian Archaeological Monuments
- Selfie Experience Split
- Salon Galić
- Split Hall of Fame
- Muzej grada Splita
- Split Science Museum and Zoo
- Treasury of Split Cathedral
- The Archbishop's Seminary
- The Franciscan Monastery of Saint Anthony

== Dubrovnik ==
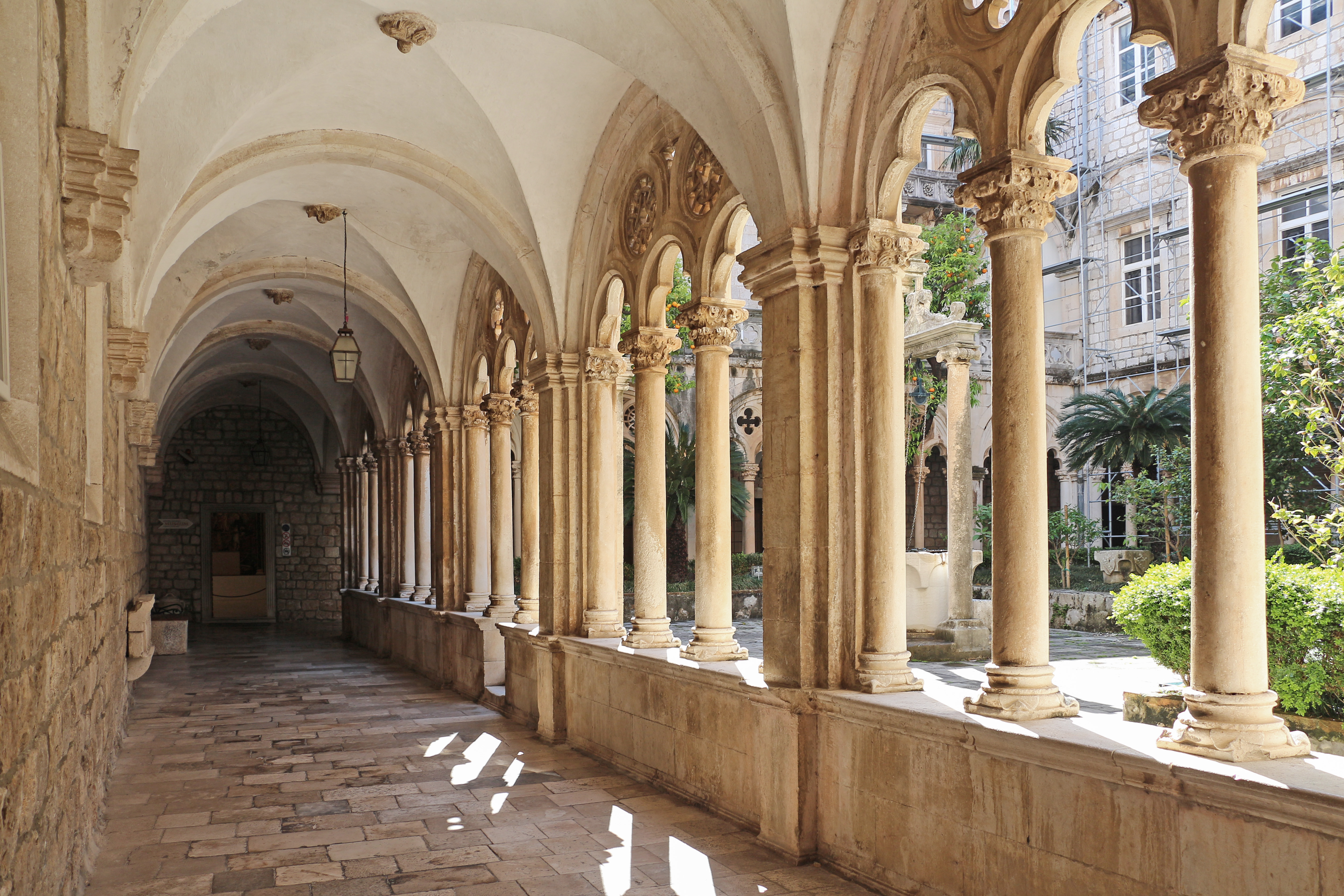
Franciscan monastery museum

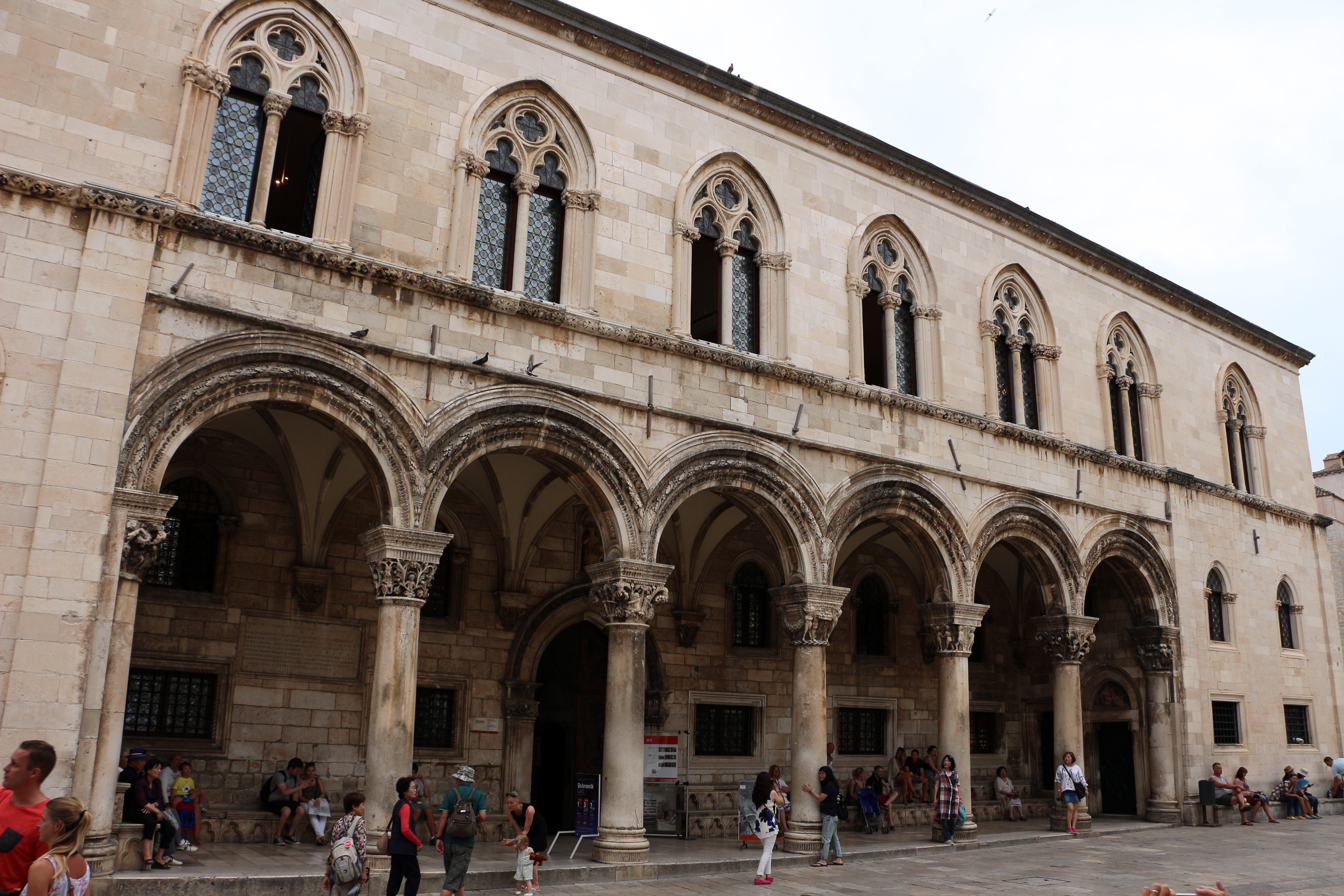
Rector's Palace

List of Museums and Galleries in Dubrovnik:

- Arheološki muzej
- Akvarij i Institut za more i priobalje
- Kulturno-povijesni muzej
- Muzej Dominikanskog samostana
- Franciscan monastery museum
- Etnografski muzej
- Muzej Domovinskog rata
- Dom Marina Držića
- Pomorski muzej
- Muzej crvene povijesti
- Muzej suvremene povijesti
- Rector's Palace
- Memorijalna kuća Ronalda Browna
- Synagogue Museum
- Muzej samostana Sigurata
- Treasury of Dubrovnik Cathedral

== Rijeka ==
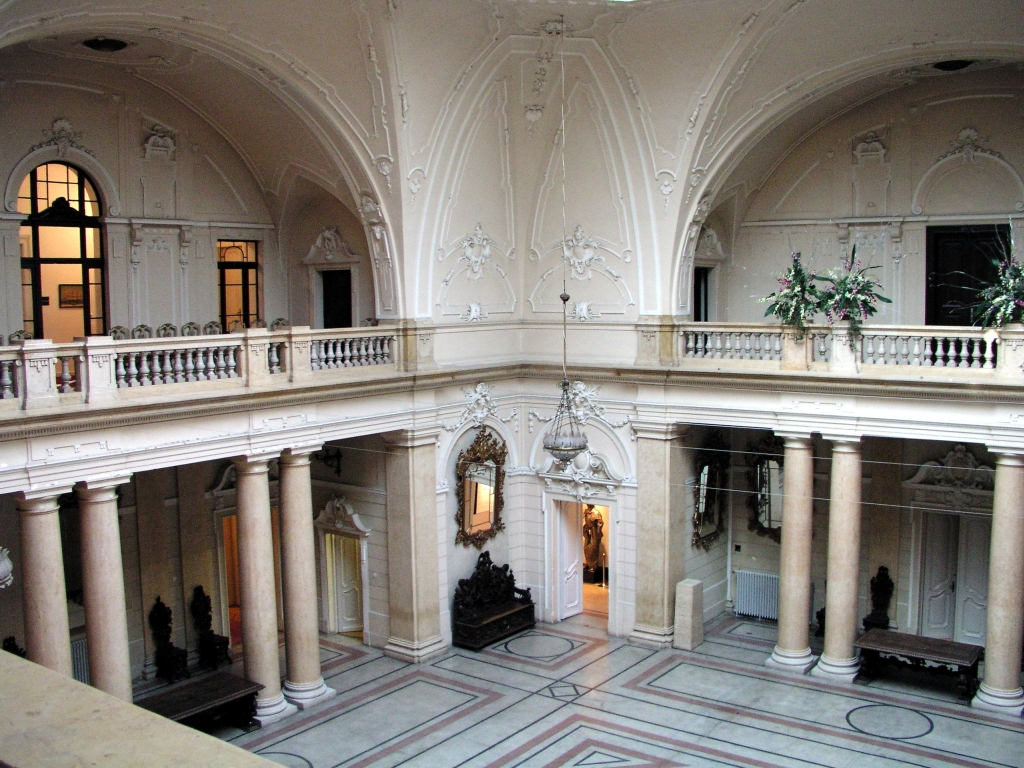
Maritime and History Museum of the Croatian Littoral

List of Museum and Galleries in Rijeka:

- Muzej grada Rijeke
- Muzej moderne i suvremene umjetnosti
- Pomorski i povijesni muzej Hrvatskog primorja
- Prirodoslovni muzej Rijeka
- PEEK&POKE

== Osijek ==
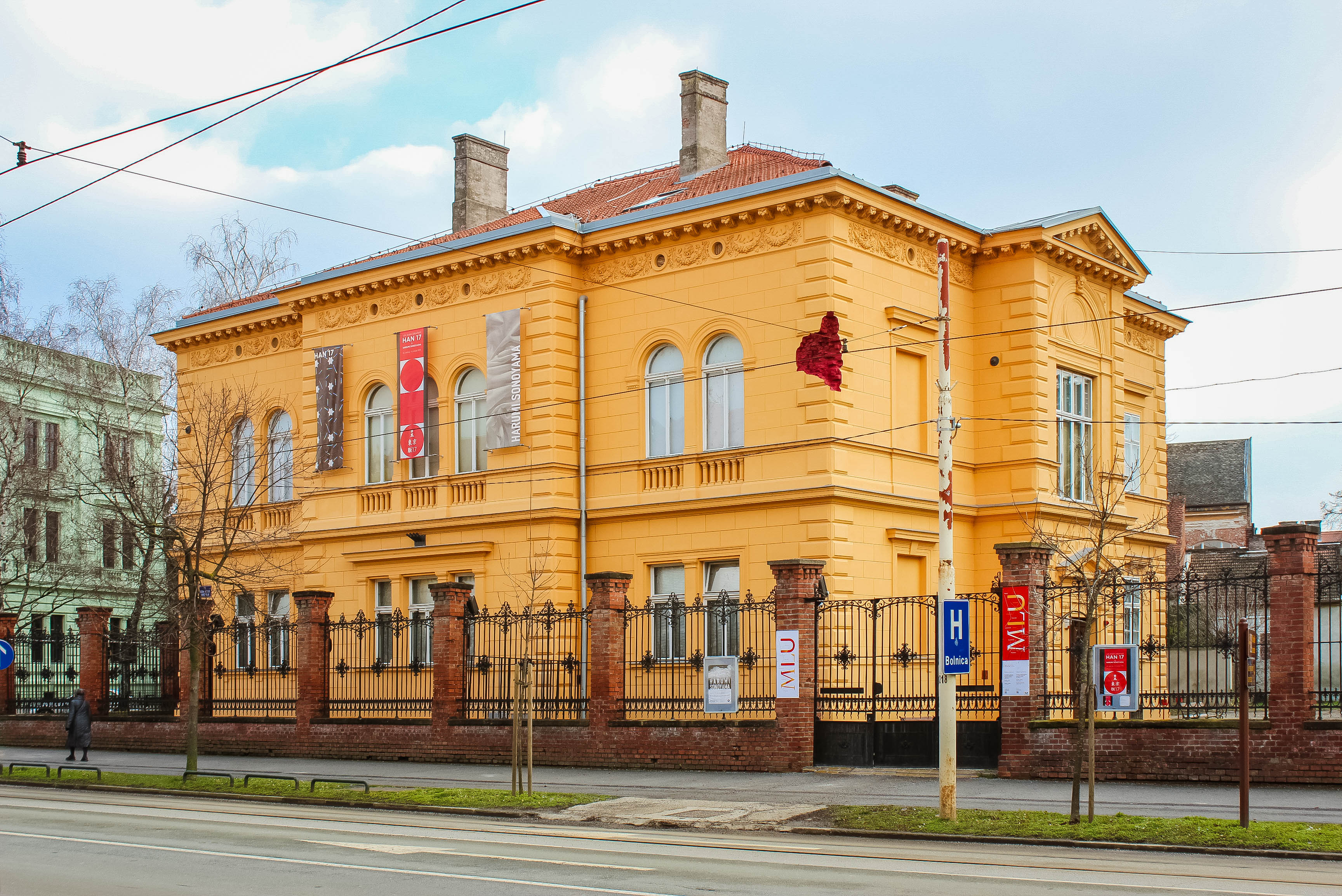
Gallery of Fine Arts

List of Museums and Galleries in Osijek:

- Archaeological Museum
- Gallery of Fine Arts
- Gallery Waldinger
- Museum of Slavonia

== Others ==
List of Museums and Galleries in Croatia, listed under counties

=== Bjelovar-Bilogora County ===
- Galerija "Barutana 1991.", Bjelovar
- Gradski muzej Bjelovar, Bjelovar
- Čazma City Museum, Čazma
- Daruvar City Museum, Daruvar

=== Brod-Posavina County ===
- Gallery Slavonski Brod, Slavonski Brod
- Muzej Brodskog Posavlja, Slavonski Brod
- Muzej tambure, Slavonski Brod
- City Museum Nova Gradiška, Nova Gradiška

=== Dubrovnik-Neretva County ===
- Arheološki muzej Narona, Vid

=== Istria County ===
- Arheološki muzej Istre, Pula, Pula
- Povijesni i pomorski muzej Istre, Pula
- City Gallery Pula, Pula
- Pazin Castle, Pazin
- Pazin City Museum, Pazin
- Ethnographical Museum of Istria, Pazin
- Umag City Museum, Umag
- Muzej Lapidarium, Novigrad

=== Karlovac County ===
- Ozalj Castle, Ozalj
- Karlovac City Museum, Karlovac

=== Krapina-Zagorje County ===
- Krapina Neanderthal Museum, Krapina
- Krapina City Gallery, Krapina
- Oršić Castle in Gornja Stubica, Gornja Stubica
- Veliki Tabor Castle, Desinić
- Galerija izvorne umjetnosti, Zlatar
- Muzej Staro selo Kumrovec, Kumrovec

=== Koprivnica-Križevci County ===
- Muzej prehrane "Podravka", Koprivnica

=== Lika-Senj County ===
- Nehaj Fortress, Senj
- Nikola Tesla Memorial Center, Smiljan
- Muzej Like Gospić, Gospić

=== Međimurje County ===
- Međimurje County Museum, Čakovec Castle

=== Osijek-Baranja County ===
- Cultural and Scientific Center "Milutin Milanković", Dalj
- Valpoovo City Museum, Valpovo

=== Požega-Slavonia County ===
- Gradski muzej Požega, Požega
- Pakrac City Museum, Pakrac

=== Primorje-Gorski Kotar County ===
- Cres Museum, Cres
- City Museum Bakar, Bakar
- Lošinjski muzej, Mali Lošinj
- Muzej grada Crikvenice, Crikvenica
- National Museum, Novi Vinodolski

=== Šibenik-Knin County ===
- Muzej grada Šibenika, Šibenik
- Museum of Saint Barbara, Šibenik
- Drniš City Museum, Drniš
- Knin City Museum, Knin

=== Sisak-Moslavina County ===
- Sisak Fortress, Sisak
- Sisak City Museum, Sisak
- Galerija Krsto Hegedušić, Petrinja
- Muzej Moslavine, Kutina

=== Split-Dalmatia County ===
- Museum of the Cetinska Krajina Region, Sinj
- Museum of the Sinjska alka, Sinj
- Bishop Museum, Hvar
- Galerija umjetnina "Branislav Dešković", Bol
- Muzej grada Kaštela, Kaštela
- Antun Gojak Gallery, Makarska
- Malacology Museum, Makarska
- Korčula City Museum, Korčula
- Omiš City Museum, Omiš
- Trogir City Museum, Trogir
- Trilj City Museum, Trilj

=== Varaždin County ===
- Trakošćan Castle, Bednja
- Varaždin Castle, Varaždin
- Gradski muzej Varaždin, Varaždin

=== Virovitica-Podravina County ===
- Pejačević Castle in Virovitica - Virovitica City Museum, Virovitica
- Orahovica City Museum, Orahovica

=== Vukovar-Srijem County ===
- Eltz Manor - Vukovar City Museum, Vukovar
- Vučedol Culture Museum, Vukovar
- City Museum of Vinkovci, Vinkovci
- Bošnjaci Forestry Museum, Bošnjaci

=== Zadar County ===
- Arheološki muzej Zadar, Zadar
- Museum of Antic glass, Zadar
- Narodni muzej Zadar, Zadar

=== Zagreb County ===
- Marton Museum, Samobor
- Samovar City Museum, Samobor
- Jastrebarsko City Museum, Jastrebarsko
- Sveti Ivan Zelina Museum, Sveti Ivan Zelina
- Muzej Turopolja, Velika Gorica

== Defunct ==
- Museum of Serbs of Croatia (1946–1963, became part of Croatian History Museum)

== List of most-visited museums in Croatia ==
This is a list of the most-visited museums in Croatia in 2024 by annual attendance statistics.

Name	Visitors in 2024	City	County
Arheološki muzej Istre	641,452	Pula	Istria County
Dubrovnik Museums	517,338	Dubrovnik	Dubrovnik-Neretva
Nikola Tesla Technical Museum	377,132	Zagreb	Zagreb
Muzej grada Splita	288,060	Split	Split-Dalmatia
Povijesni i pomorski muzej Istre	193,291	Pula	Istria County
Klovićevi Dvori Gallery	139,815	Zagreb	Zagreb
Muzej Domovinskog rata	134,398	Dubrovnik	Dubrovnik-Neretva
Zagreb City Museum	111,847	Zagreb	Zagreb

== See also ==
- List of museums
- Tourism in Croatia
