= HZM =

HZM may refer to:

- Masayuki Hiizumi, Japanese musician
- Herzogtum (abbreviated Hzm.), the German equivalent of a duchy
- Helmholtz Zentrum München, German research centre
- Hong Kong–Zhuhai–Macau Bridge (or HZM Bridge)
- Croatian Railway Museum (Hrvatski željeznički muzej)
