= Froggyland =

Taxidermy collection and museum in Split, Croatia

- Location: Split, Croatia
- Coordinates: 43°30′36.3″N 16°26′16.9″E
- Type: Taxidermy collection
- Owner: Ivan Medvešek
- Website: froggyland.net

Froggyland is a taxidermy collection and museum located in Split, Croatia. The museum is known for its display of 21 dioramas containing 507 different taxidermy frogs posed to appear as if they are participating in human activities.

== History ==
Ferenc Mere was a taxidermist during the 19th and 20th centuries; he was born in 1878 to Hungarian parents and grew up near a pond of frogs. Inspired by the popularity of taxidermy during the 19th century, From 1910 to 1920, Mere spent his time catching, killing, and stuffing Rana escuelenta, a species of frog commonly known as the "edible frog". Mere then arranged the frogs into various scenes depicting human activities, including playing poker, attending school, and performing in a circus. Although Mere initially collected over 1000 of these frogs, only 507 survive.

In 1970, after being discovered in an attic in Serbia, the Froggyland exhibits were bought by the parents of the current owner; they moved the frogs to Split, Croatia, to start the museum. It was eventually passed down to their son, Ivan Medvešek, who owns the museum as of 2021. However, in the same year, he announced plans to sell Froggyland to investors in the United States, citing revenue losses sustained during the COVID-19 pandemic as the reason for the transaction.

The museum has also attracted controversy for Mere's use of stuffed frogs in the exhibits, which critics believe to be animal cruelty.

== Maintenance ==
Every five years, the frogs in the museum are kept preserved with injections of formaldehyde and ammonia; they are also repainted with a layer of varnish.

== See also ==
- List of museums in Croatia
- Walter Potter — British taxidermist whose collection consisted of 79 frogs
