= Ferdinand Budicki Automobile Museum =

Museum in Zagreb, Croatia

Coordinates: 45°52′19″N 15°49′32″E

Ferdinand Budicki Automobile Museum (Croatian: Muzej automobila "Ferdinand Budicki") is an automobile museum in Zagreb, Croatia, the first one in the country. It is located on Zaprešićka 2, Jablanovec as a part of the Westgate shopping center. It was opened on 3 July 2013 (12 years ago), and features more than 100 antique and classic cars, motorcycles and bicycles, as well as several thousand photos from family albums of first Croatian drivers.

The museum was founded by car enthusiast Valentino Valjak, and named after Ferdinand Budicki, owner of the first car to drive through Zagreb streets, in April 1901. Among the museum's exhibits are a 1916 truck from Prague, the oldest in Croatia, an expensive Jaguar E-Type, a 1922 Ford Model T, a rare 1967 Rolls-Royce Silver Shadow worth more than €100,000, a Citroën 2CV, known locally as "spaček" and a Zastava 750 ("fićo"), as well as a blue ZET tram. It also showcases the history of automobilism in Croatia through photographs and several hours of documentary film.

The museum took part in the 2015 Museum Night, bringing in 14,500 visitors. On 17 April 2015, it started to organise a weekly car exhibition on Britain Square in the city centre. Its first non-permanent exhibition lasted from September 1 to November 1 and featured six Citroën 2CV cars in honour of the 65th anniversary of 2CV.

== Opening hours ==
The museum entrance fee is 30 kuna (around €4) for adults and 20 kuna (around €2.60) for children, as it is privately funded. It is open seven days a week.

== Change of location ==
In 2018, the museum moved from the former Pluto factory in Zavrtnica neighborhood to Westgate Shopping City, a large shopping mall north-west of Zagreb in Zaprešić.

It closed its doors on the original site in 2018 due to a lack of public funding and disagreements between mayor Milan Bandić and manager Valentino Valjak.

== See also ==
- List of museums in Croatia
