= Ferdinand Budicki =

Automobile pioneer from Zagreb, Croatia

Ferdinand Budicki II
- Budicki, c. 1940
- Born: 11 April 1871; Zagreb, Kingdom of Croatia-Slavonia
- Died: 25 June 1951 (aged 80); Zagreb, Yugoslavia
- Known for: Pioneering motorsports in Croatia

Ferdinand Budicki II (/bʊdˈɪtskiː/; 11 April 1871 – 25 June 1951) was a Croatian pioneer of car, bicycle and airplane culture. A resident of Zagreb, Croatia, Budicki was reportedly the first to drive a car in his home city, and the first to open a car dealership and repair shop in Croatia. In April 1901, he drove from Vienna, Austria to Zagreb in an 1899 Opel, stirring up a commotion, as people and horses that drove carriages at the time were not used to motor vehicles, even though the car's top speed was, according to Budicki, a mere 30 km/h (19 mph).

== Early life ==
Ferdinand Budicki was born on 11 April 1871 in Zagreb to Marija (née Panian) and Ferdinand Budicki (Sr.). His parents were renowned craftspeople.

Having completed two grades of Realschule, Budicki first trained for a locksmith, then studied mechanics abroad. He assembled his own bicycle while living in Vienna. He subsequently used it in 1897 to travel throughout Europe and northern Africa, reportedly traversing 17,323 kilometres (10,764 mi).

== Family ==
He married twice, first to Josephine Axmann (1877–1965) of Vienna, with whom he had five children. They divorced in 1912. In his later years he remarried, to his former maid Pepica Bocivaušek, who cared little for his sporting legacy.

Their eldest daughter Greta lived with her mother in Vienna and married Harald Svenfelt, a cavalry officer in the Swedish army and co-owner of the Cloetta Ljungsbro chocolate factory. Their children include dressage athlete Ulla Håkansson.

Their surviving son, Dr. Viktor Budicki (1905–1944) was a bacteriologist, trained in the US and served in the military in 1927 in Varaždin. In WWII, he was interned in the Stara Gradiška concentration camp by the Ustaše, accused of hiding foreign citizens. He died in a 1944 camp typhoid epidemic, and was honourably buried in a marked grave for his medical service to camp detainees and Ustaše alike. He operated a children's hospital in the camp, and disinfected the camp's wells with the help of Julij Hrženjak. His Austrian-American wife, Margaret Juers Budicki, settled in Eugene, Oregon and worked as a field counselor for the Lane County Juvenile Department, where she authored poetry in a book titled "Splinters" and contributed articles to the feminist magazine The Women's Press.

Their youngest daughter Jelena studied teaching and English at Newbold College, then worked as the Adventist Church secretary and treasurer for the Sava Conference until 1930. She married Pastor Fred Edwards, an English missionary to Ghana and teacher at the Adventist school in Agona, Ashanti. Their three children are dentist and missionary to the Caribbean Thomas Siegfried Ferdinand Edwards (1931–2013), youth pastor and author Ronald Valerius Edwards (1932–2022) and Margaret Anthony.

Ferdinand speculated in family letters that the "unique" surname Budicki is a corruption of the Polish "Budiczky".

== Career ==
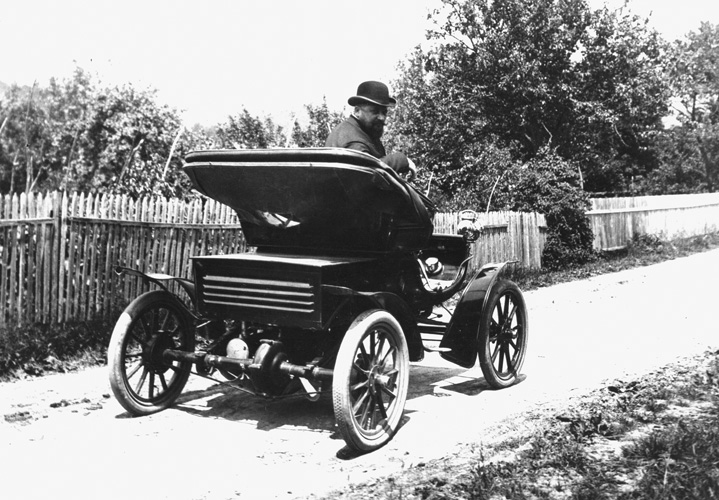
Ferdinand Budicki, automobile pioneer, seated in his car, ca. 1920s? (Photo courtesy of Croatian Technical Encyclopedia)

In 1901, Budicki purchased a used car from Opel & Beyschlag in Vienna for 4,000 Austro-Hungarian crowns. The car had single-cylinder 3.5 horsepower (2.6 kW) motor and could reach a speed of 20 km/h (12 mph). Its fuel consumption was 10 L/100 km (28 mpg_{‑imp}; 24 mpg_{‑US}). Budicki was taught how to drive by Otto Beyschlag and received extra training in the form of observing an electric tram driver at work. He subsequently drove the car from Vienna to Zagreb. The following year, he travelled the same route on a Laurin & Klement motorcycle. This took him 13 hours and 45 minutes; his progress was reported live at Zagreb's Ban Jelačić Square.

Whether he was the first car driver in Zagreb is disputed, as an Obzor article states that Count Marko Bombelles from Varaždin drove to Zagreb in a Benz & Cie. car on 17 August 1899.

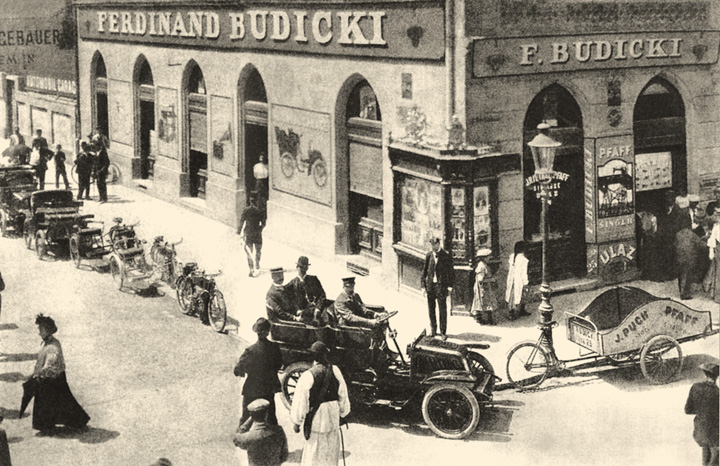
F. Budicki's car, two-wheeler and sewing machine shop at 2 Gundulićeva Street, Zagreb, 1910. (Photo courtesy of Croatian Technical Encyclopedia)

On 28 August 1901, Budicki received his driving licence in Vienna. In 1904, he started giving driving lessons. In 1910 Zagreb started to issue its own driving licences. Budicki's license was not recognised, so he took a driving examination on 27 July 1910 and received the licence with serial number 1. However, as none of the examination committee members knew how to drive, Budicki had to teach them before the examination. He subsequently opened Zagreb's first driving school. Budicki was also the first to receive a traffic ticket for speeding on 6 June 1901 in Mavrova Street (today Masaryk Street). In 1905 he flew a hot air balloon from Zagreb to nearby Gornja Stubica and Mraclin, taking the first aerial photos of Zagreb, while the next year he completed a successful flight from Zagreb to the Adriatic island of Krk.

Budicki entered the business of new vehicles by opening a bicycle and sewing machine shop called K touristu ("At the Tourist's") at 24 Mavrova Street in 1899. In the early 1900s, the shop began selling cars and motorcycles as well. On 1 June 1906, Budicki founded the first Croatian Automobile Society, which opened with 14 members. From 1910 to 1928 he was the general distributor for Ford in the Kingdom of Croatia-Slavonia. In 1929, he started a taxicab company and a bus line from Zagreb to Sv. Ivan Zelina. Later that year he had to exit the automobile business due to the stock market crash of 1929, retaining only a car repair shop.

== Death ==
Budicki died in Zagreb on 25 June 1951 at the age of 80. He was buried in Mirogoj Cemetery, Zagreb, but his remains were transferred to the 12th Mirogoj Cemetery ossuary due to lack of upkeep. He was born a Roman Catholic and became a Seventh-Day Adventist in his later years.

== Legacy ==
On 4 July 2013, the Ferdinand Budicki Automobile Museum was opened in Zagreb, honouring Budicki's pioneering legacy in its name. In 2018 the museum moved to Westgate Shopping City, Zaprešić, due to a lack of public funding and disagreements between mayor Milan Bandić and manager Valentino Valjak. The Varaždin City Museum hosts Budicki's cycling medals.

Interview by author Valentino Valjak

"Later on, I didn't realise till quite recently that he [Ferdinand Budicki] was an engineer. That's interesting, something that has to be very precise, and that's the kind of man I believe he was. I met him once - it was the first time we could visit Zagreb after the war - that was, I think, 1947, I'd be about 14 then..."

— Pr. Ronald V. Edwards, Documentary film BEŠTE LJUDI - IDE AUTO (2019)

Valjak has written extensively about Budicki in his book BEŠTE LJUDI - IDE AUTO (Povijest automobilizma u Hrvatskoj 1898. -1945.) [RUN PEOPLE - A CAR IS COMING (A history of motoring in Croatia 1898-1945). A documentary film by the same name has also been produced in Croatian, with an English interview of grandson Ronald V. Edwards.

In Zagreb, there is a Ferdinand Budicki Street in the neighbourhood of Staglišće.

Budicki is also remembered as the founder of Zagreb Fair and Croatian Sports Alliance.

His descendants live in the United Kingdom, United States, Sweden, Croatia, and Spain.
