= Nikola Tesla Memorial Center =

- Memorijalni centar Nikola Tesla
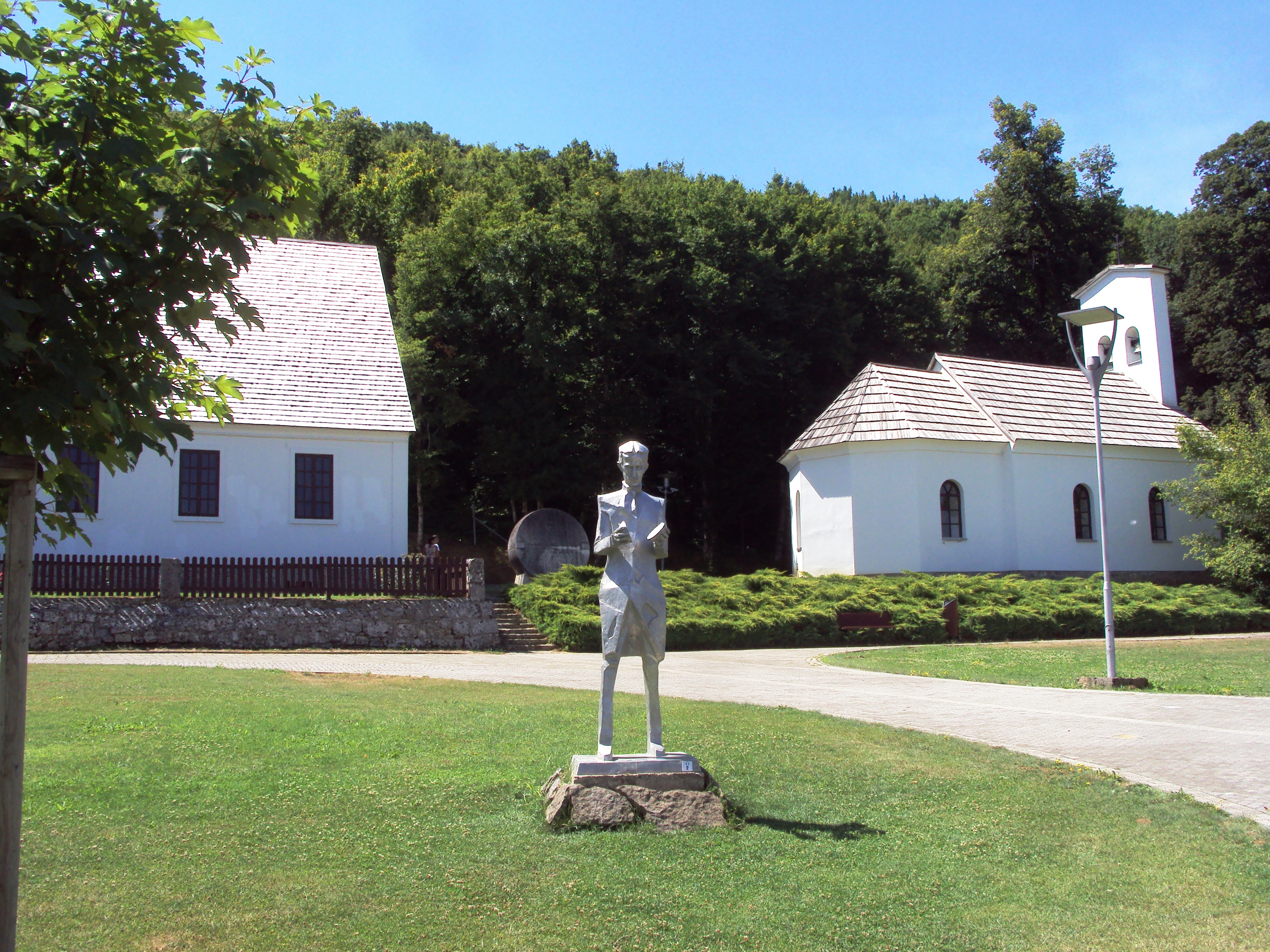
- Statue of Tesla at the site; a reconstruction of his birthplace home is to the left.

- The location of the Memorial Center within Croatia
- Established: 2006; 20 years ago
- Location: Smiljan, Croatia
- Coordinates: 44°33′34.06″N 15°18′31.21″E
- Type: Biographical and technology museum
- Visitors: 49,553 (2017)
- Director: Vacant (acting director)
- Curator: Ana-Marija Šolaja
- Website: mcnikolatesla.hr/en/

The Nikola Tesla Memorial Center (Croatian: Memorijalni centar Nikola Tesla) is a cultural-historical site and museum located in Smiljan, Croatia, located at the birthplace of Nikola Tesla, one of the world's foremost engineers and inventors. It is dedicated to Tesla, who was born in 1856 in his Serb parents house in Smiljan, then part of the Kingdom of Croatia within the Austrian Empire. The young engineer later left his homeland to work in America. The Lika Museum in nearby Gospić administers the site.

== History ==
The Memorial Center was opened to the public on the 150th anniversary of Tesla's birthday, 10 July 2006, by the President of the Republic of Croatia. The original memorial site was first established as a museum in 1956, but it was damaged during the Croatian War of Independence when a projectile fell on the commercial building next to Nikola Tesla's house. The fire was eventually put out by the Croatian Army who deposited furniture and other objects it saved in the Museum of Lika. The Croatian authorities restored the complex and reopened it in a 2006 ceremony, with the highest dignitaries of Croatia and Serbia attending. After the war it was renovated, improved, equipped and opened as Memorial Center in 2006.

== Architecture and exhibits ==
On its surface area of 1.37 square kilometres, the memorial complex contains various components: museum in the birth house of Nikola Tesla (where the details of his life are shown in a permanent exhibition of artifacts, documents, photographs and audiovisual material), the Serbian Orthodox Church of St. Peter and Paul, an old agricultural building, village cemetery, Tesla's testing station, stone monuments, benches and river banks designed by architect Zdenko Kolacio, metal statue of Nikola Tesla made by sculptor Mile Blažević, open-air auditorium, prototypes of some Tesla's inventions (induction motor, Tesla's turbine, rotating magnetic field, Tesla coil), multimedia center etc.

Various scientific and educational activities or presentations are occasionally organized in the Memorial Center. Over the past years the number of visitors coming to the site has been steadily growing. 41,000 tourists from many countries from all over the world visited the center in 2016. In 2018 this number increased to over 44,000 people.

== See also ==
- List of museums in Croatia

== Gallery ==
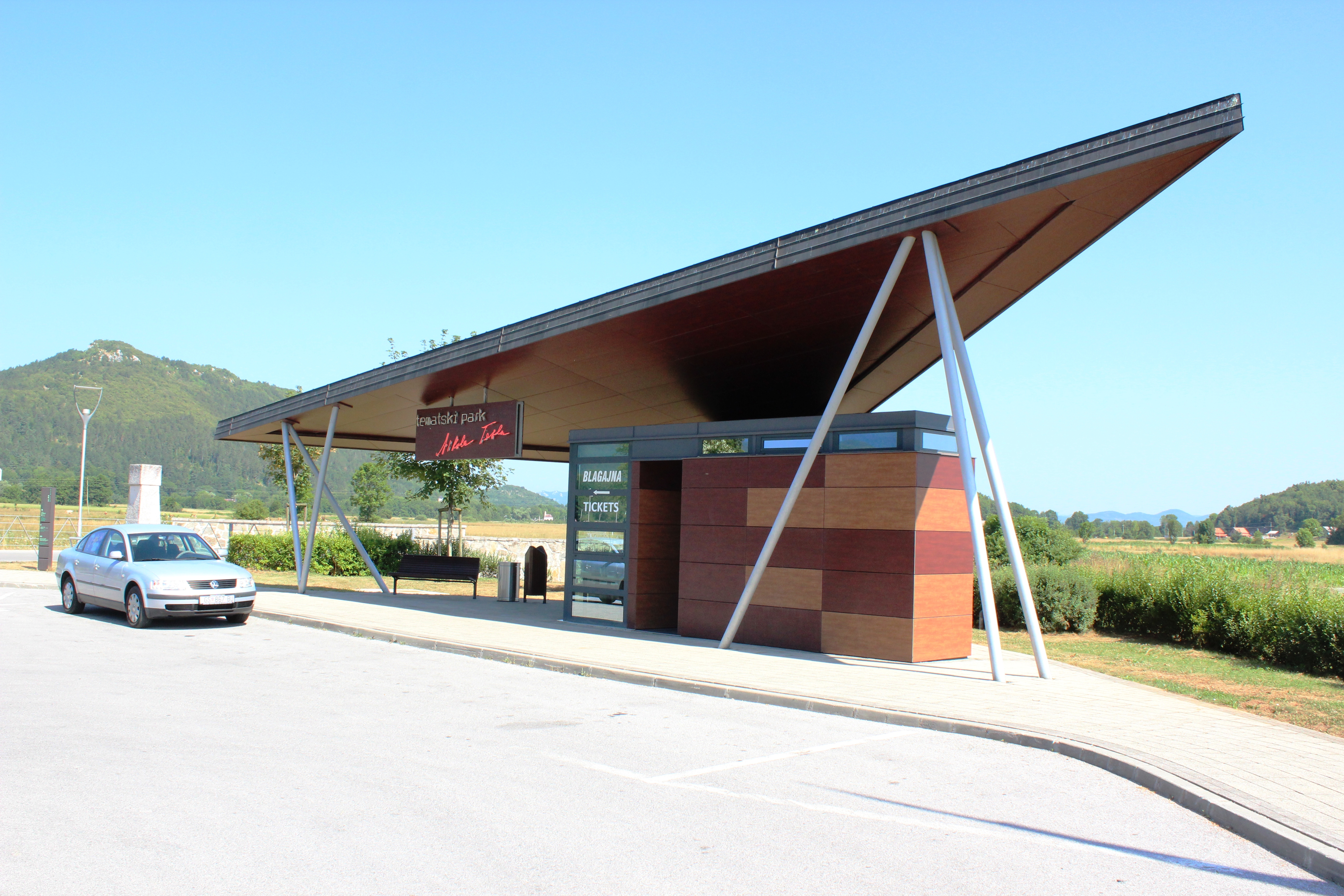
Memorial Center reception building

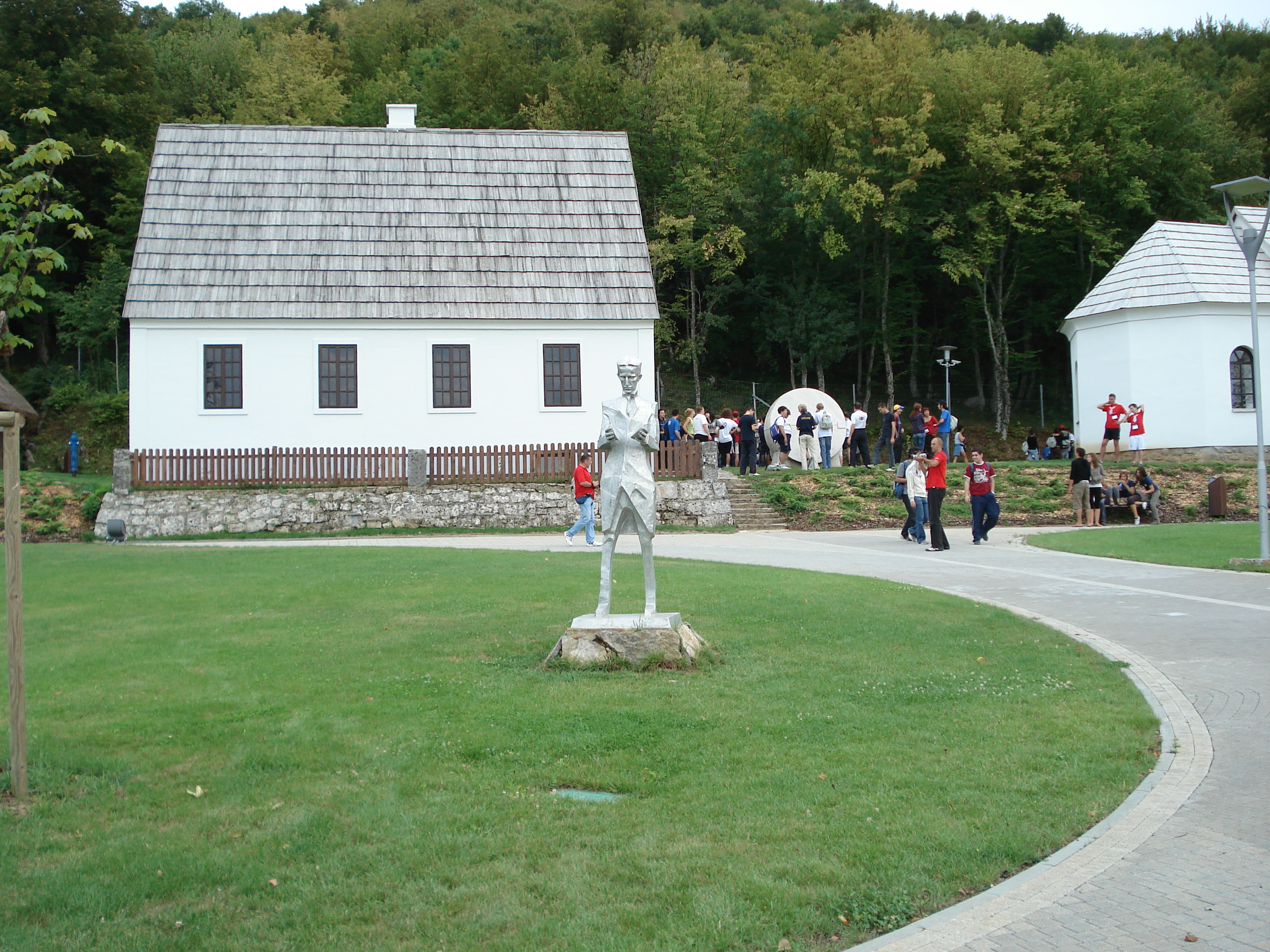
Tourists visiting Memorial Center

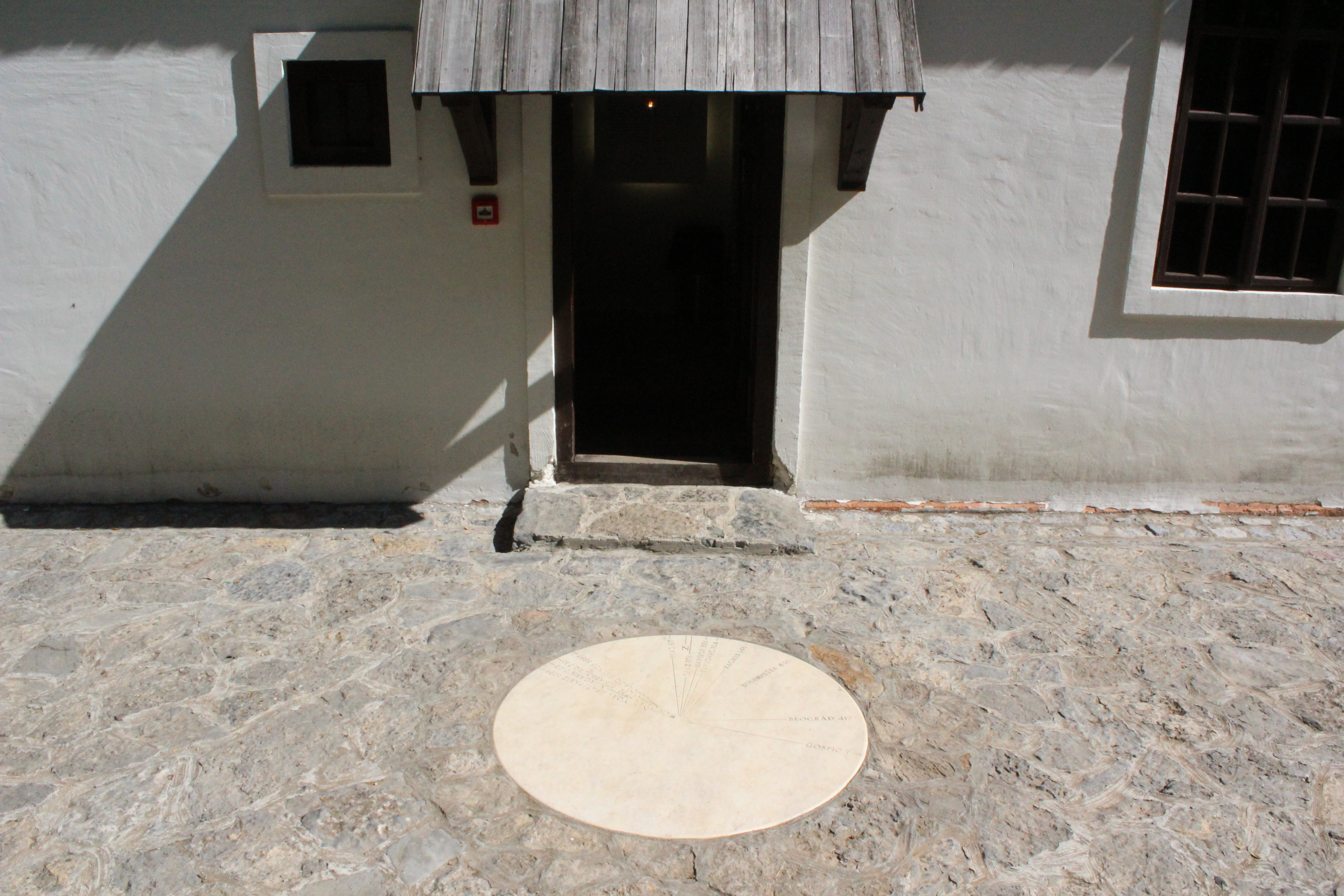
Tesla's birth house entrance

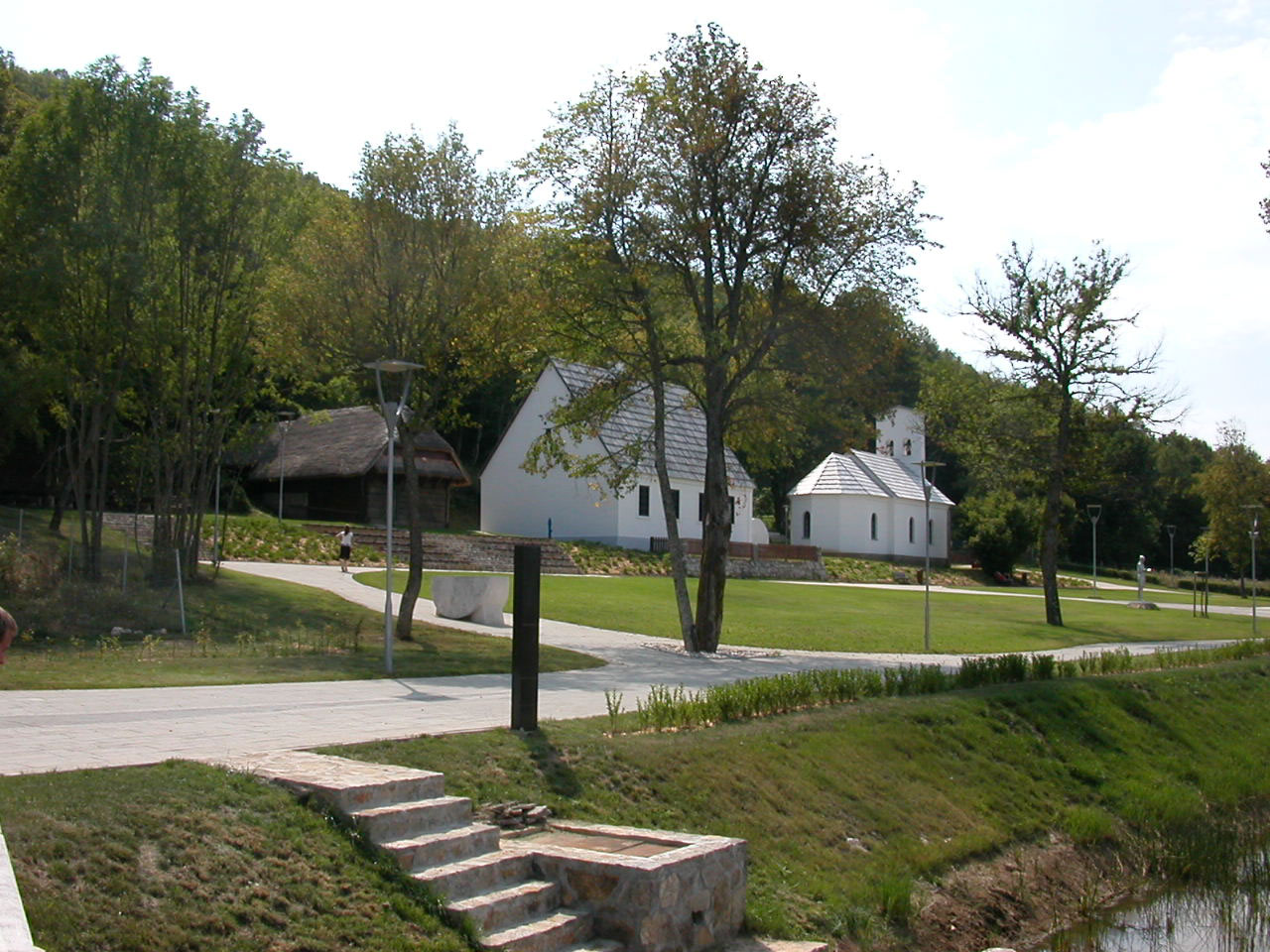
Buildings and surrounding area

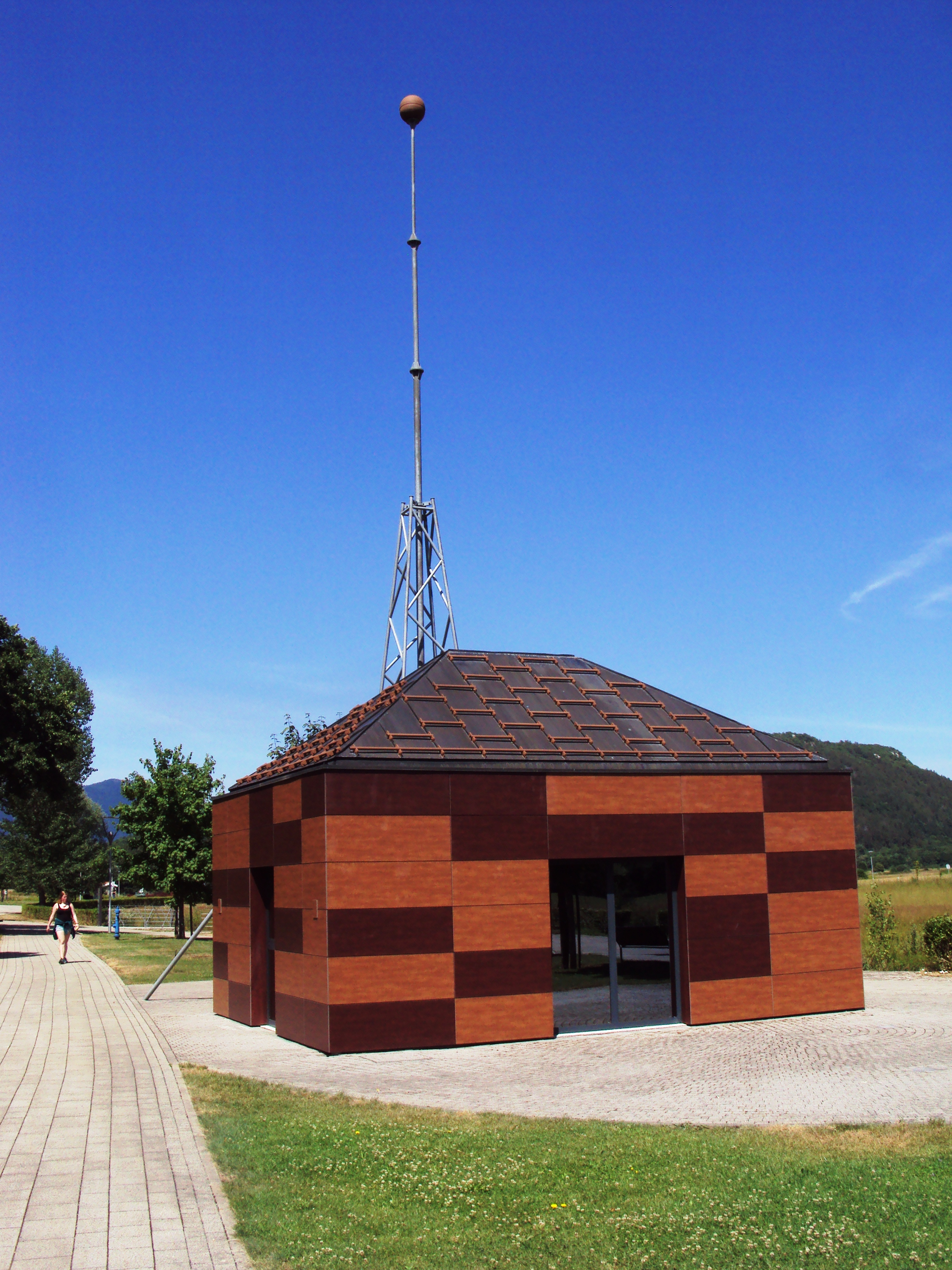
Tesla's experimental station

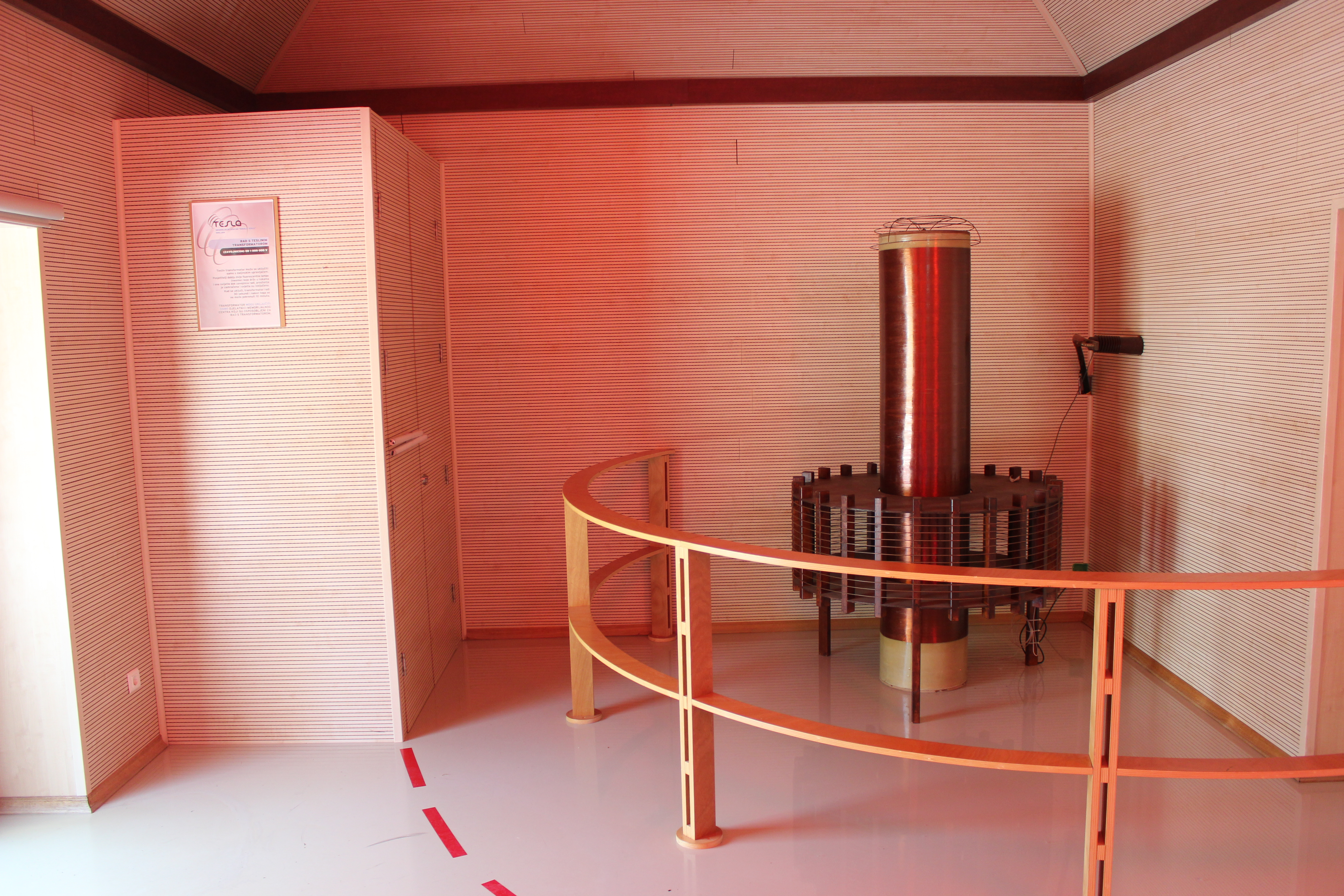
Tesla coil

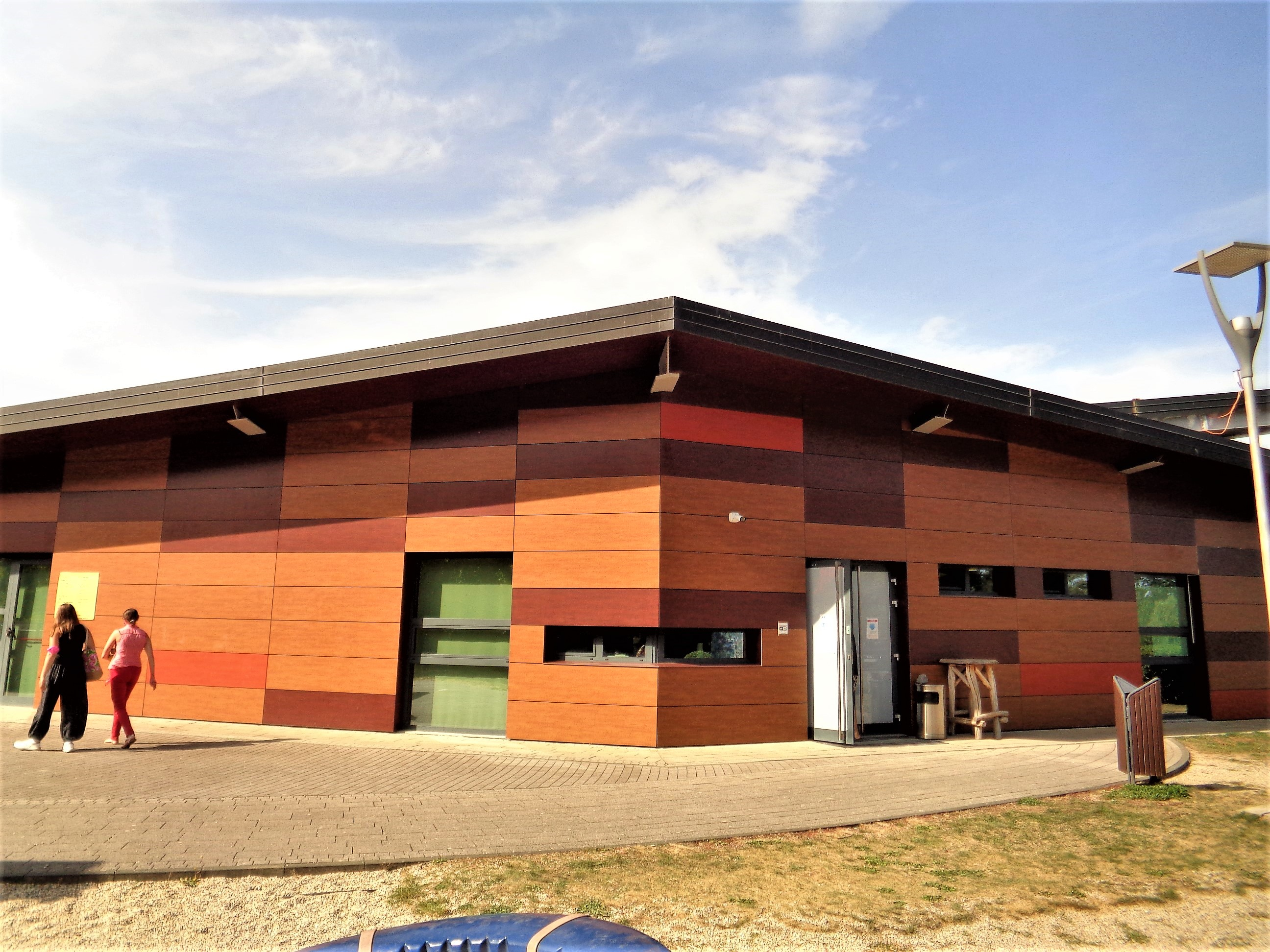
Multimedia center

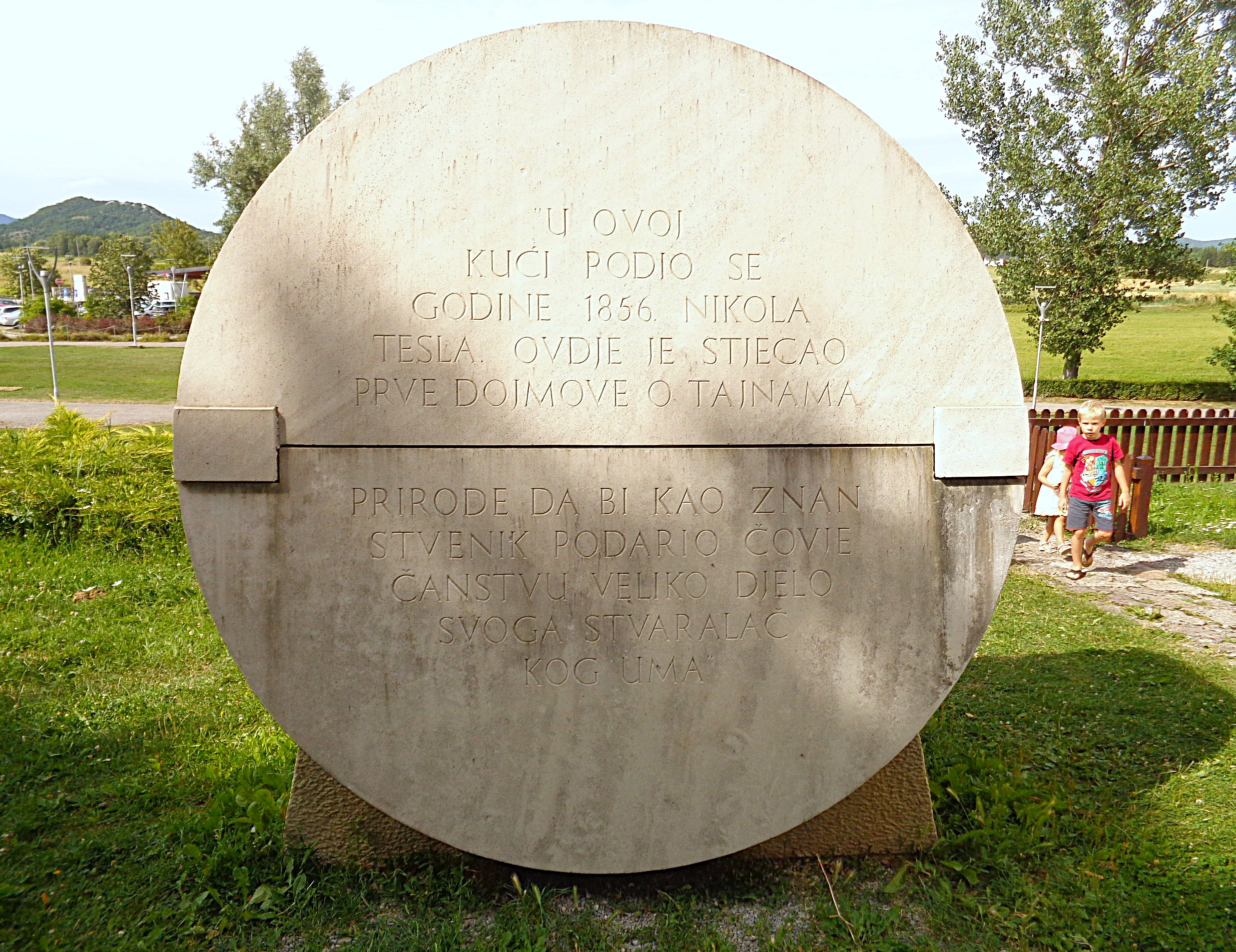
Round information stone block at Tesla's house

== See also ==
- List of museums in Croatia
- Tesla Science Center at Wardenclyffe
- Nikola Tesla Museum, Belgrade, Serbia
- List of science museums
