= Osijek Archaeological Museum =

- Arheološki muzej Osijek
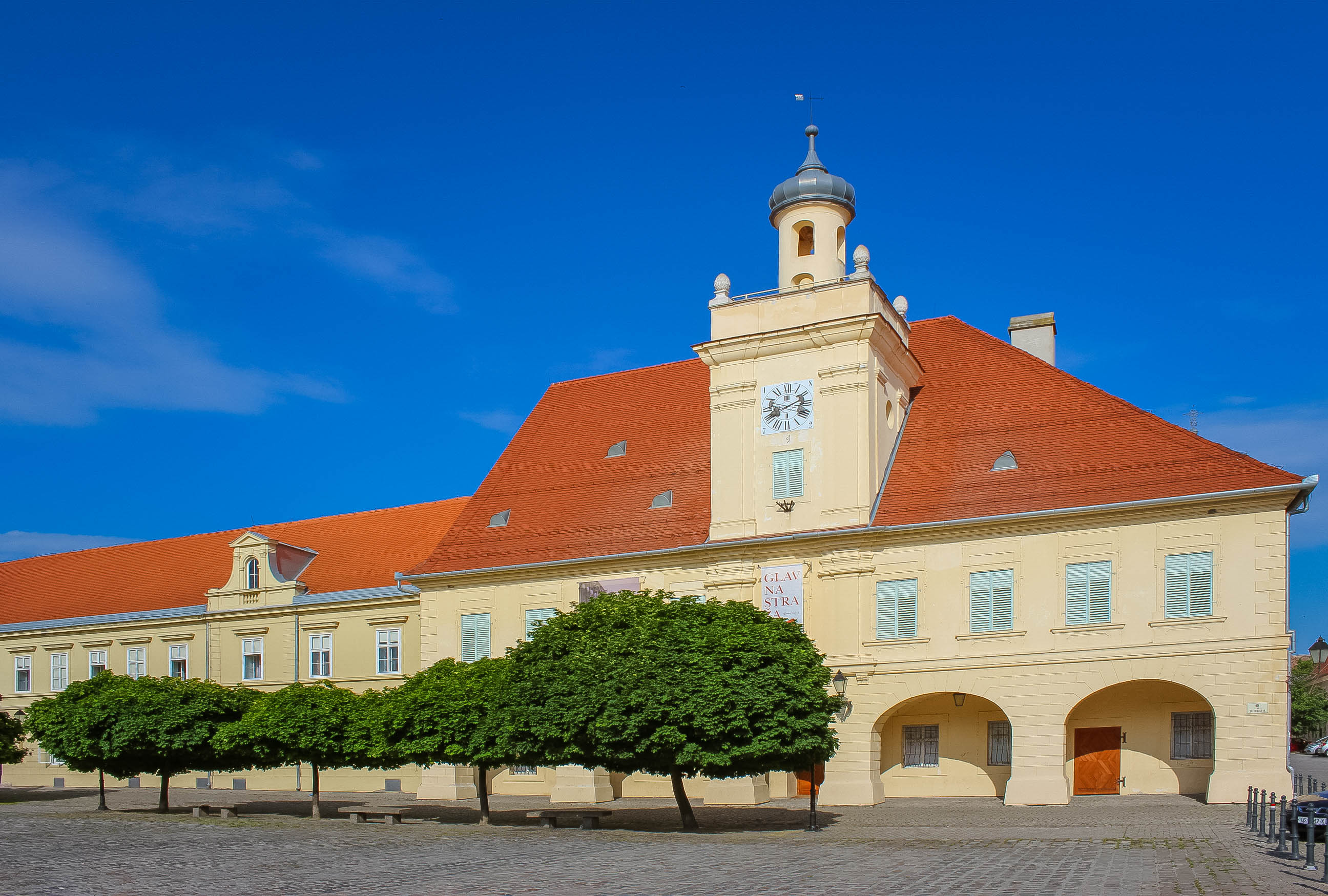
- Established: 28 April 2005 (21 years ago)
- Location: Osijek, Croatia
- Coordinates: 45°33′39″N 18°41′43″E
- Type: Archaeological museum
- Director: Zvonko Bojčić
- Curators: Domagoj Dujmić (for prehistory); Tomislav Hršak (for prehistory); Igor Vukmanić (for antiquity)
- Website: amo.hr

Osijek Archaeological Museum (Croatian: Arheološki muzej Osijek) is an archaeological museum in Osijek, Croatia. It is located in Tvrđa.

It consists of two buildings: The City Guard and Brožan House.

The museum was established on 28 April 2005 by a decision of the Government of the Republic of Croatia.

It was opened on 16 November 2007, in a ceremony attended by Božo Biškupić, the Minister of Culture.

== See also ==
- List of museums in Croatia
