= Bošnjaci Forestry Museum =

Forestry museum in Bošnjaci, Croatia

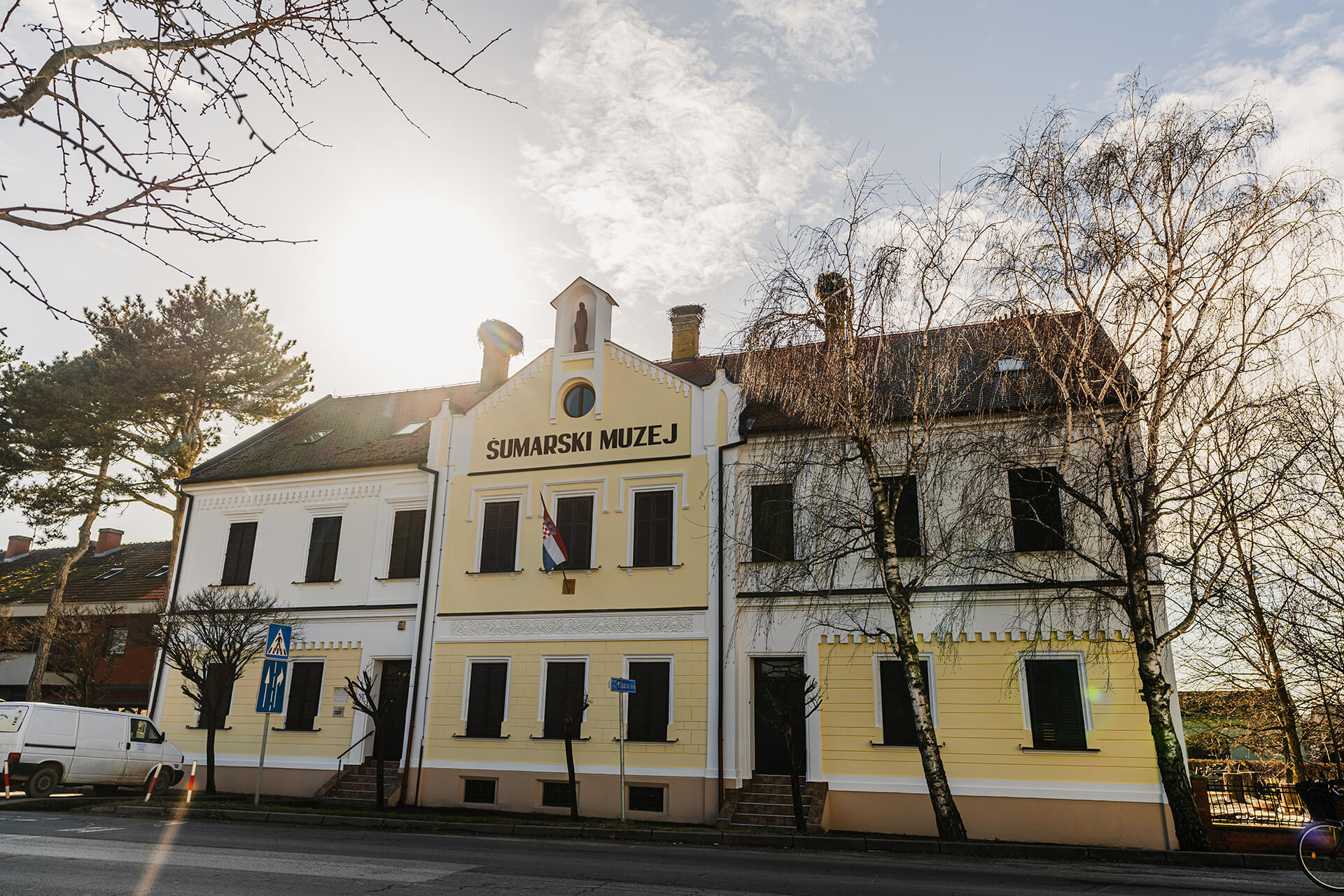
- Location: Bošnjaci, Croatia
- Coordinates: 45.04953°N 18.75611°E

The Bošnjaci Forestry Museum (Croatian: Šumarski muzej Bošnjaci) is a regional natural history museum in the village of Bošnjaci in eastern Croatia. It shows the history of forestry in eastern Slavonia, mainly in the oak forests of the Spačva basin, and belongs to the state forestry company Hrvatske šume.

== History ==
The idea of a forestry museum for the Spačva forest area came from the Society of Forest Engineers and Technicians of the Hrast forestry company in Vinkovci in the 1970s. Work started in 1988, when the former village school, built in 1869, was given to the project. Renovation stopped during the Croatian War of Independence and resumed in 2005. The museum opened in 2007.

== Collection ==
The exhibition covers 500 square metres (5,400 sq ft) and has more than 700 objects. Its sections cover tools for tending forests, felling trees and making timber products, log hauling, forest protection, a dendrology collection, mapping, timber marks, hunting and wildlife, and an ethnographic corner. There is also a picture gallery and a park with outdoor exhibits. Most objects were donated by people from Bošnjaci and other villages near the Spačva basin, the Vinkovci town museum and the forestry offices of the Vinkovci forest administration.

It is one of two forestry museums in Croatia. The other is in Krasno.
