= The City Guard in Osijek =

Historical building in Osijek, Croatia

The City Guard
- Zgrada Glavne straže
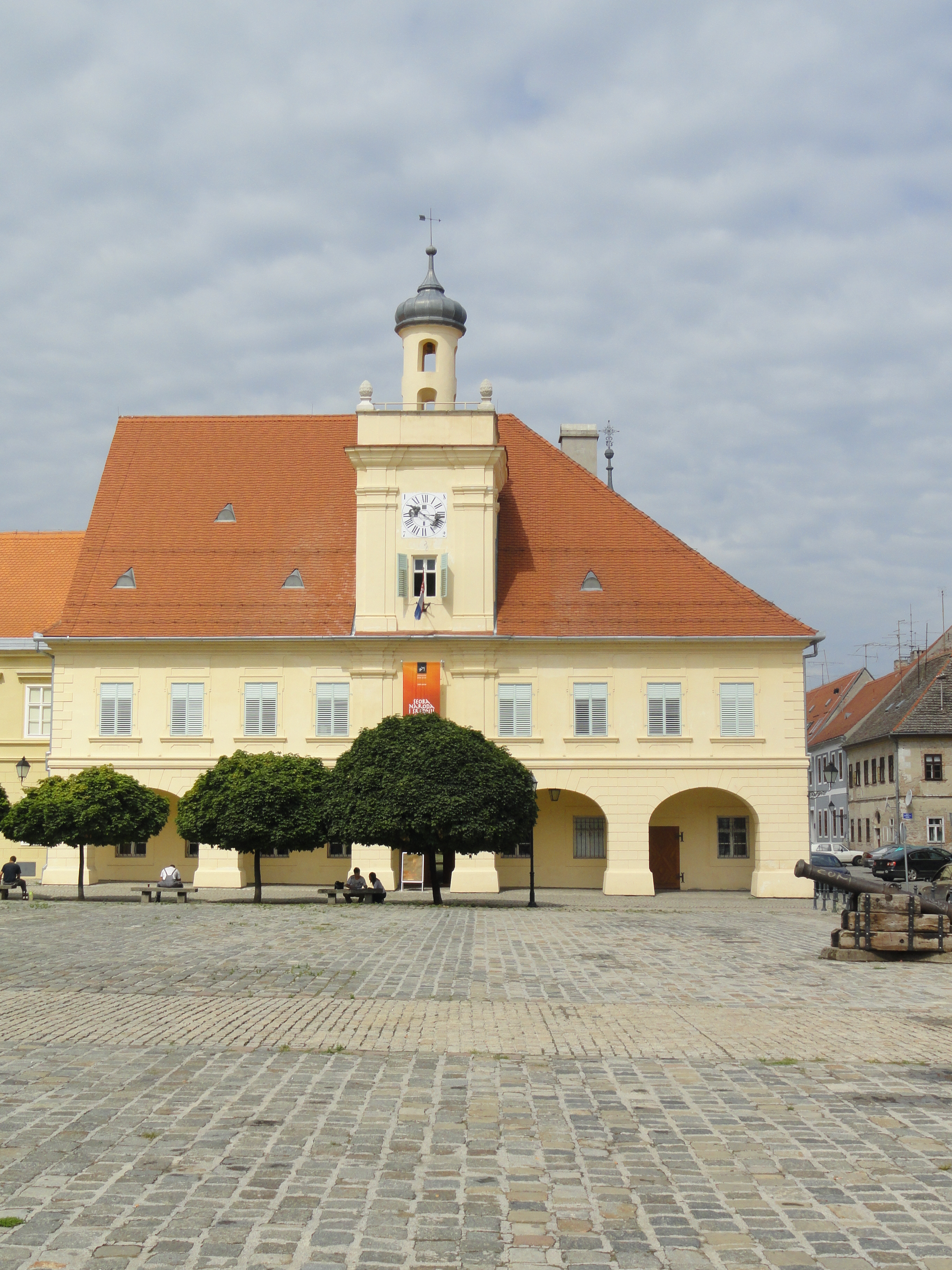
- Interactive map of the The City Guard area
- Alternative names: Glavna straža

General information
- Architectural style: Baroque
- Location: Osijek, Croatia, Trg Svetog Trojstva 2
- Coordinates: 45°33′39″N 18°41′43″E
- Current tenants: Archaeological Museum Osijek
- Construction started: 1728
- Completed: 1729
- Opened: 1729; 297 years ago

Technical details
- Floor count: 2

The City Guard (Croatian: Zgrada Glavne straže) is the name of the building which formerly housed the city guard of Osijek, Croatia. It is located in Tvrđa.

Today, the building houses the Archaeological Museum Osijek, a local museum focusing on the history of the city.

== History ==
The structure was built from 1728 to 1729. It was recently renovated in 2006.

== Description ==
The building has 2 floors. Located on Holy Trinity Square, the facade of the City Guard building features a prominent arcade . The building also includes a bell tower with an attached terrace, from the top of which the entirety of Tvrđa is visible.

The building was renovated in 2006; during the renovation a steel-glass structure was also added, as designed by Branko Silađin.
