= Croatian Maritime Museum =

Coordinates: 43°30′31″N 16°26′50″E

- Hrvatski pomorski muzej
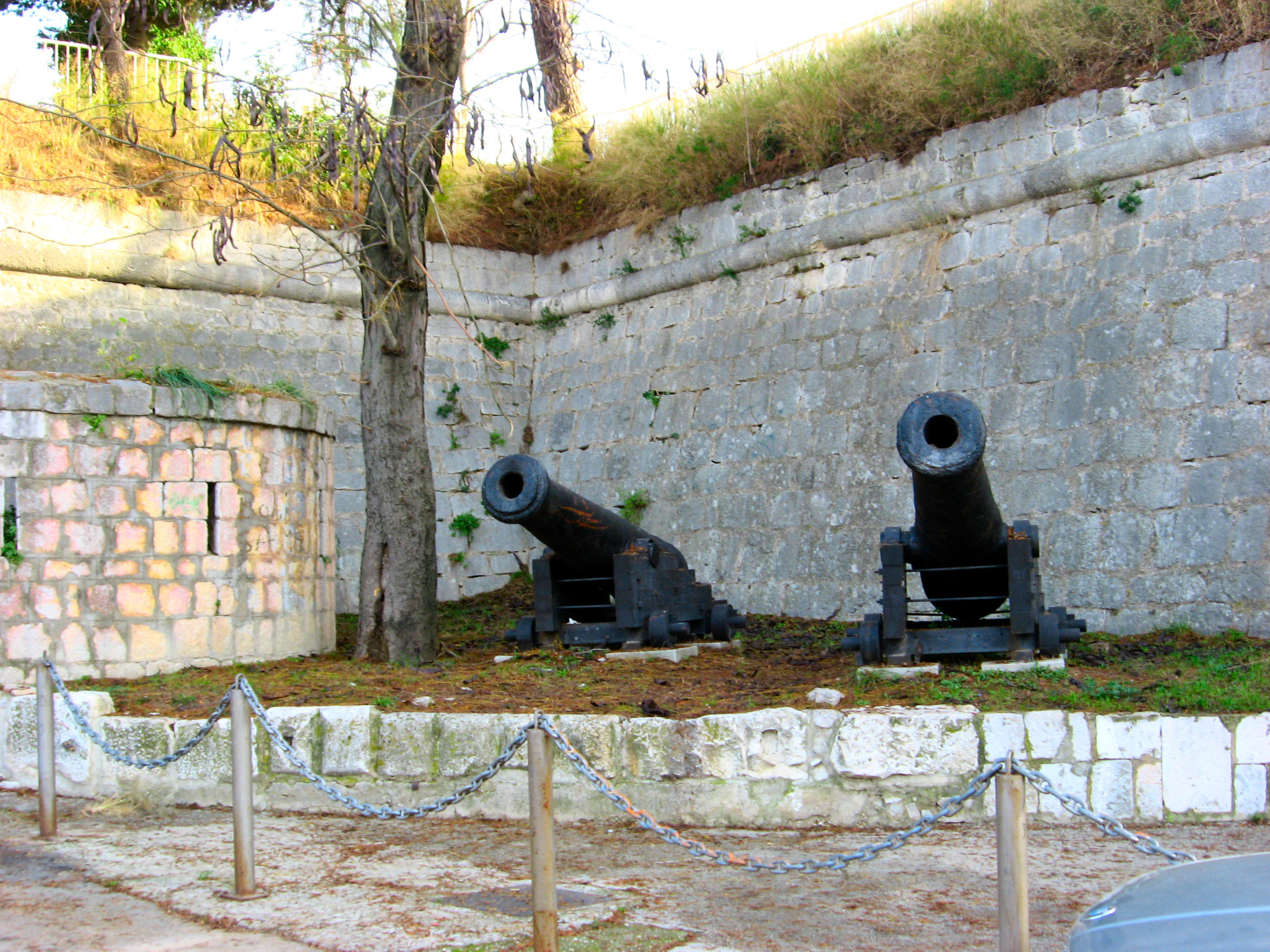
- Cannons near the entrance to the museum grounds
- Established: 1997
- Location: Gripe Fortress, Split, Croatia
- Type: Maritime museum
- Visitors: 8,585 (2017)
- Founder: City of Split
- Website: hpms.hr

The Croatian Maritime Museum (Croatian: Hrvatski pomorski muzej) is a maritime museum in Split, Croatia. The museum is located in a 19th-century building, itself built within the 17th-century Gripe Fortress. The museum was established in 1997 as a successor to the 1925 Maritime Museum, the Military-Maritime Museum established by the Yugoslav Navy in 1960 while also inheriting the collection of the Maritime Museum of the Yugoslav Academy of Sciences and Arts which existed between 1956 and 1985.

== See also ==
- List of museums in Croatia
