= Croatian Railway Museum =

Museum in Zagreb, Croatia

Coordinates: 45°48′04″N 15°59′03″E

- Hrvatski željeznički muzej
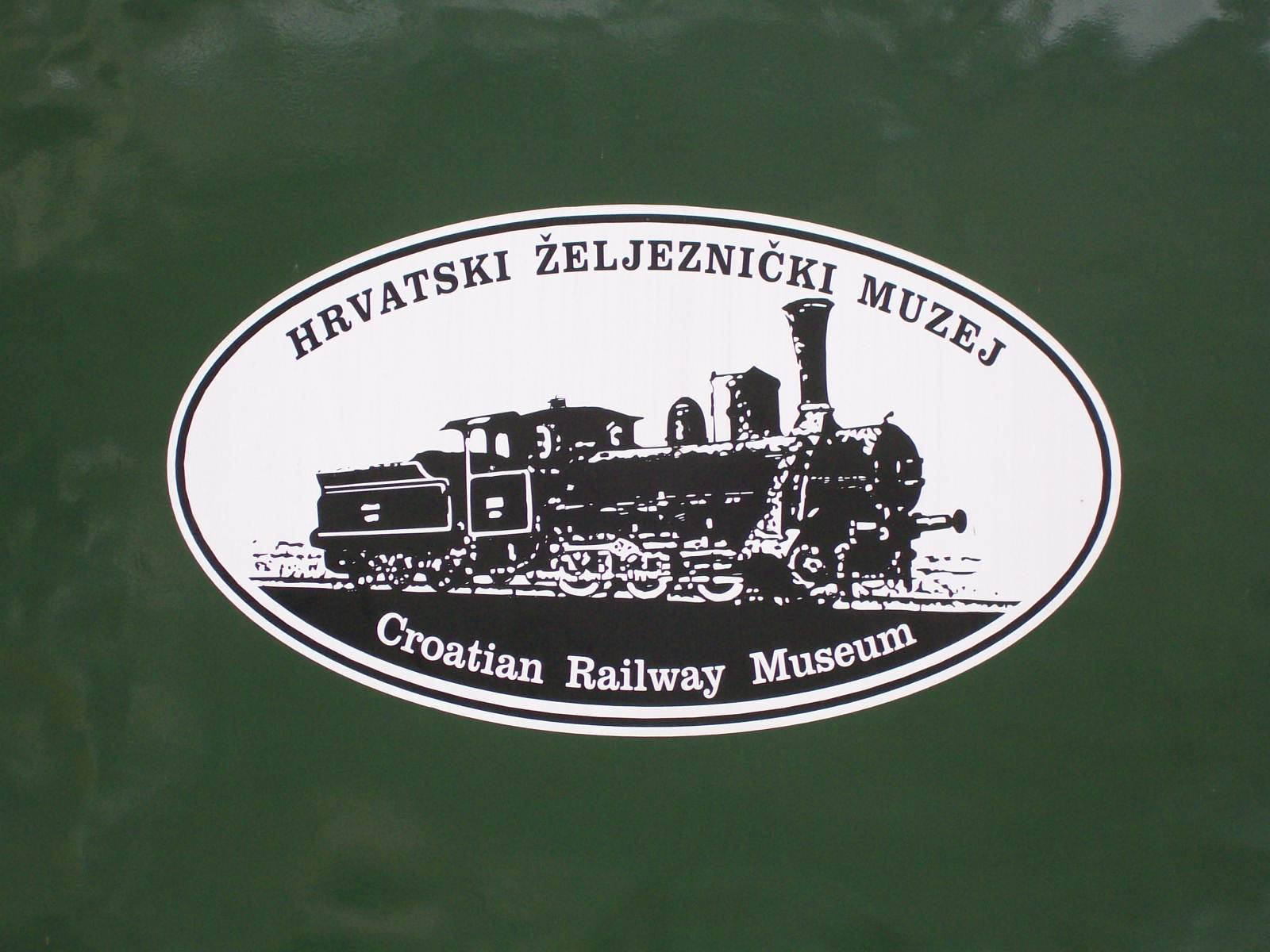

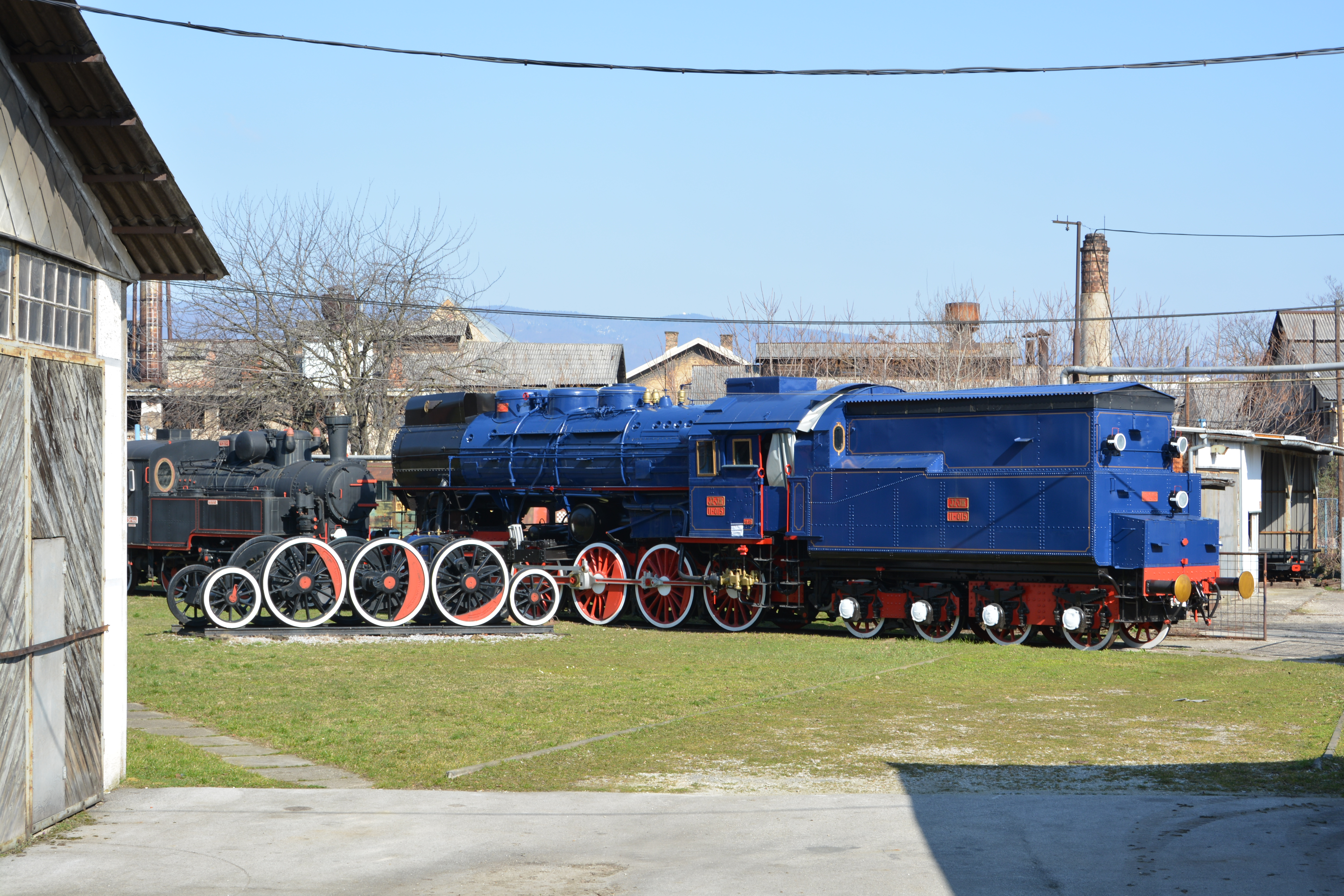
- Established: 19 March 1991; 35 years ago
- Location: Zagreb, Croatia
- Visitors: 6,052 (2017)
- Director: Tamara Štefanac
- Website: muzej.hzinfra.hr

Croatian Railway Museum (Croatian: Hrvatski željeznički muzej) is a specialized technical museum in Croatian capital Zagreb, located on the premises of Zagreb Glavni kolodvor, the main railway station of Zagreb.

== History ==
Efforts to establish a railway museum in Zagreb go back to 1966, when Zagreb railway administration decided to establish the Railway Department within the Zagreb Technical Museum, but due to limited space and lack of staff, it could not be carried out.

The museum was established on 19 March 1991 by the Croatian Railways as the Railway Museum of Croatia (Croatian: Željeznički muzej Hrvatske). It was renamed to the current name by a decision of Croatian Railways on 20 May 2001.

== See also ==
- List of museums in Croatia
