= Bošnjaci =

- Municipality
- Municipality of Bošnjaci; Općina Bošnjaci
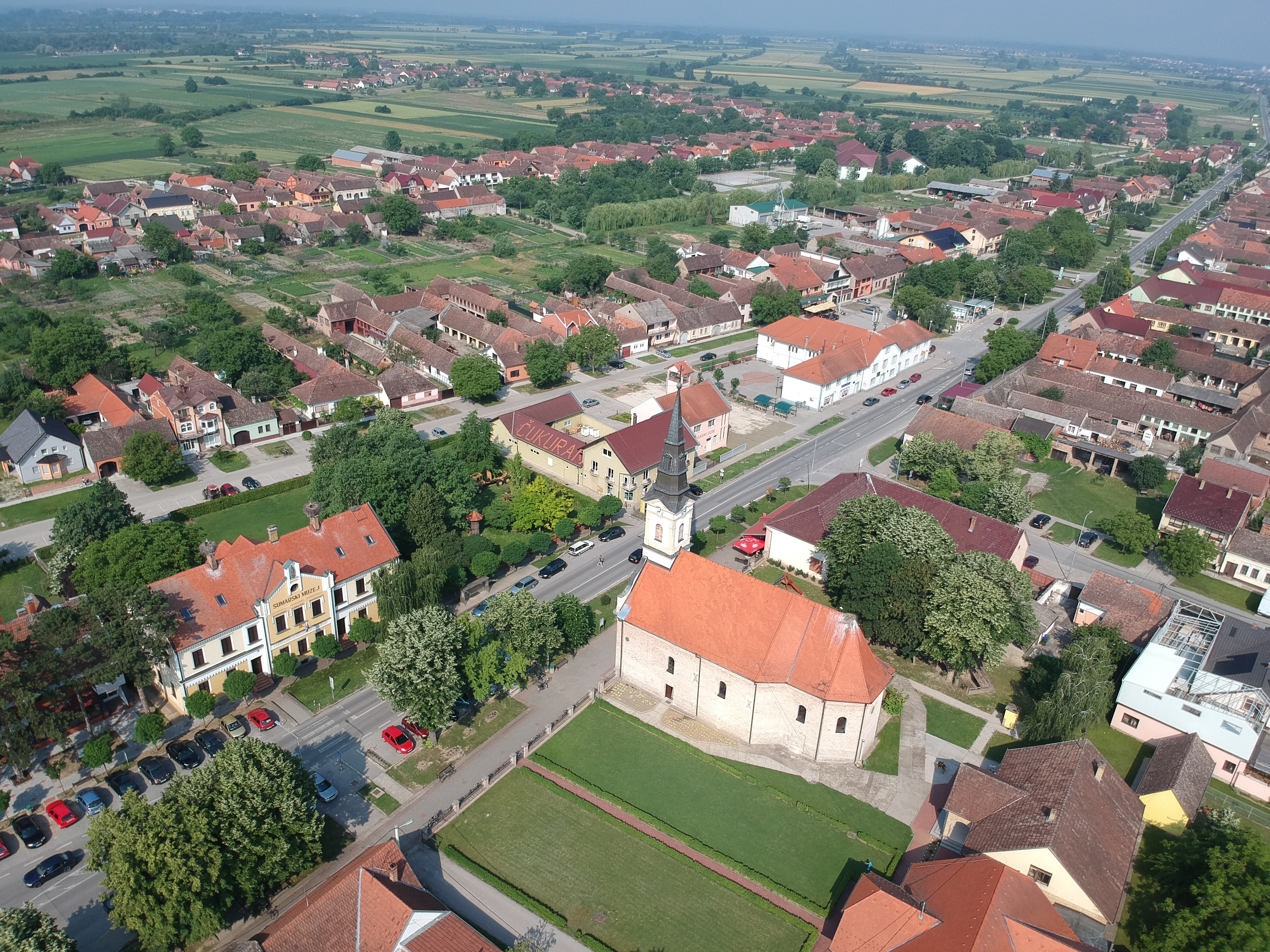

- Flag Coat of arms

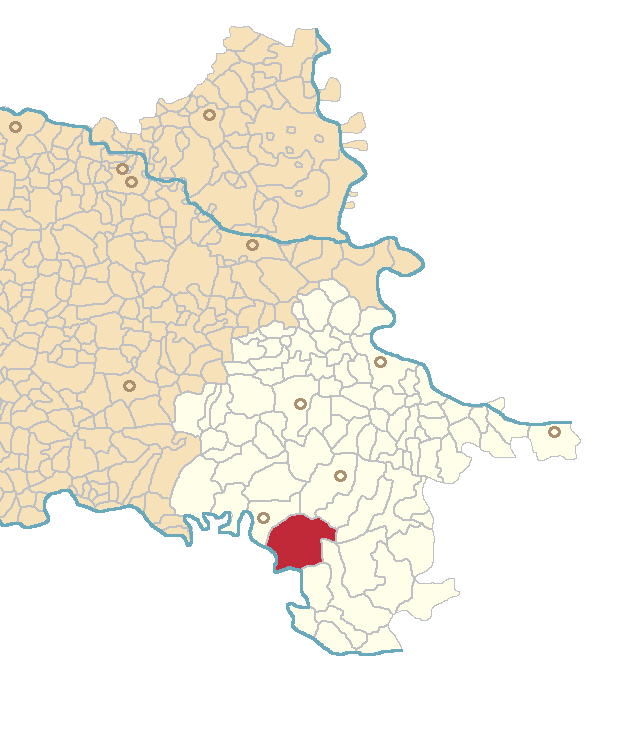
- Location of Bošnjaci in Croatia

- Location within Vukovar-Syrmia County Location within Croatia Location within Europe
- Coordinates: 45°03′N 18°46′E
- Country: Croatia
- County: Vukovar-Syrmia County

Government
  - Municipal mayor: Andrija Juzbašić (HSS)

Area
  - Municipality: 95.0 km^{2} (36.7 sq mi)
  - Urban: 95.0 km^{2} (36.7 sq mi)

Population (2021)
  - Municipality: 2,868
  - Density: 30.2/km^{2} (78.2/sq mi)
  - Urban: 2,868
  - Urban density: 30.2/km^{2} (78.2/sq mi)
- Time zone: UTC+1 (CET)
  - Summer (DST): UTC+2 (CEST)
- Postal code: 32275 Bošnjaci
- Area code: 32
- Website: www.bosnjaci.hr

Bošnjaci (Hungarian: Bosnyáki) is a village and municipality in Vukovar-Syrmia County in eastern Croatia. The 2011 census listed a total of 3,855 inhabitants, 98.8% of whom identified themselves as Croats.

== See also ==
- Spačva basin
