= Talisman =

Protective object

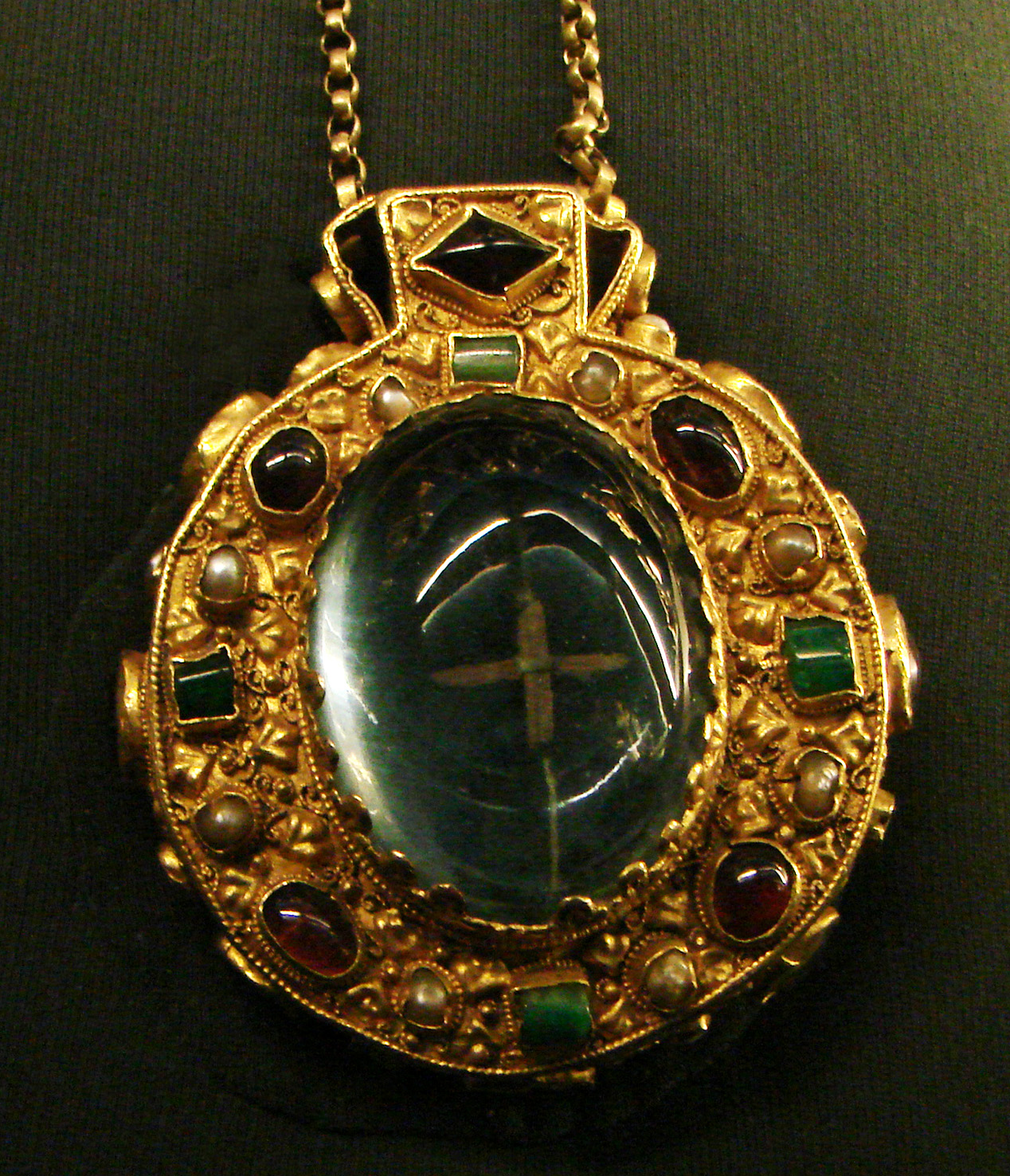
The Talisman of Charlemagne, also a reliquary, said to have been found on his body when his tomb was opened

Colonia Aurelia Cibalae 3rd century ring with an evil eye talisman. City Museum of Vinkovci, Croatia

A talisman is any object ascribed with religious or magical powers intended to protect, heal, or harm individuals for whom they are made. Talismans are often portable objects carried on someone in a variety of ways, but can also be installed permanently in architecture. Talismans are closely linked with amulets, fulfilling many of the same roles, but a key difference is in their functions. An amulet protects a person or possession against evil forces while a talisman provides good fortune.

Talismans have been used in many civilizations throughout history, with connections to astrological, scientific, and religious practices; but the theory around preparation and use has changed in some cultures with more recent, new age, talismanic theory. Talismans are used for a wide array of functions, such as: the personal protection of the wearer, loved ones or belongings, aiding in fertility, and helping crop production.

== Etymology ==
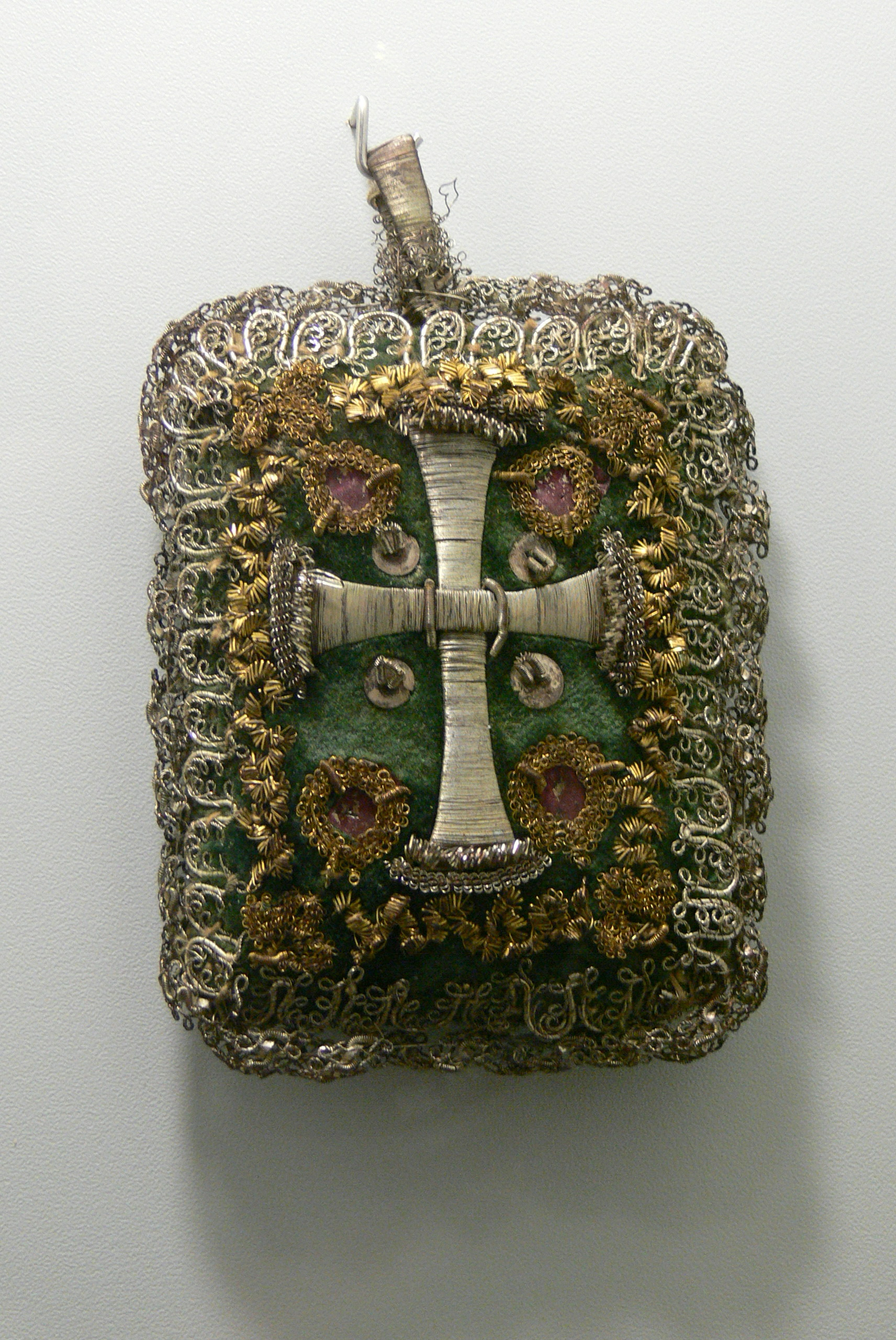
Christian talisman (Breverl), 18th century

The word talisman comes from French talisman, via Arabic ṭilasm (طِلَسْم, plural طلاسم ṭalāsim), which comes from the Ancient Greek telesma (τέλεσμα), meaning 'completion, religious rite, payment', ultimately from the verb teleō (τελέω), 'I complete, perform a rite'.

== Preparation of talismans ==
=== New Age ===
According to New Age talismanic practices, features with magical associations—such as colors, scents, symbology, and patterns, figures—can be integrated into the creation of a talisman in addition to the chosen planetary or elemental symbolism. However, these must be used in harmony with the elemental or planetary force chosen so as to amplify the intended power of the talisman. It is also possible to add a personal touch to the talisman by incorporating a verse, inscription, or pattern that is of particular meaning to the maker. These inscriptions can be sigils (magical emblems), bible verses, or sonnets, but they too must be in harmony with the talisman's original purpose.

=== Islam ===
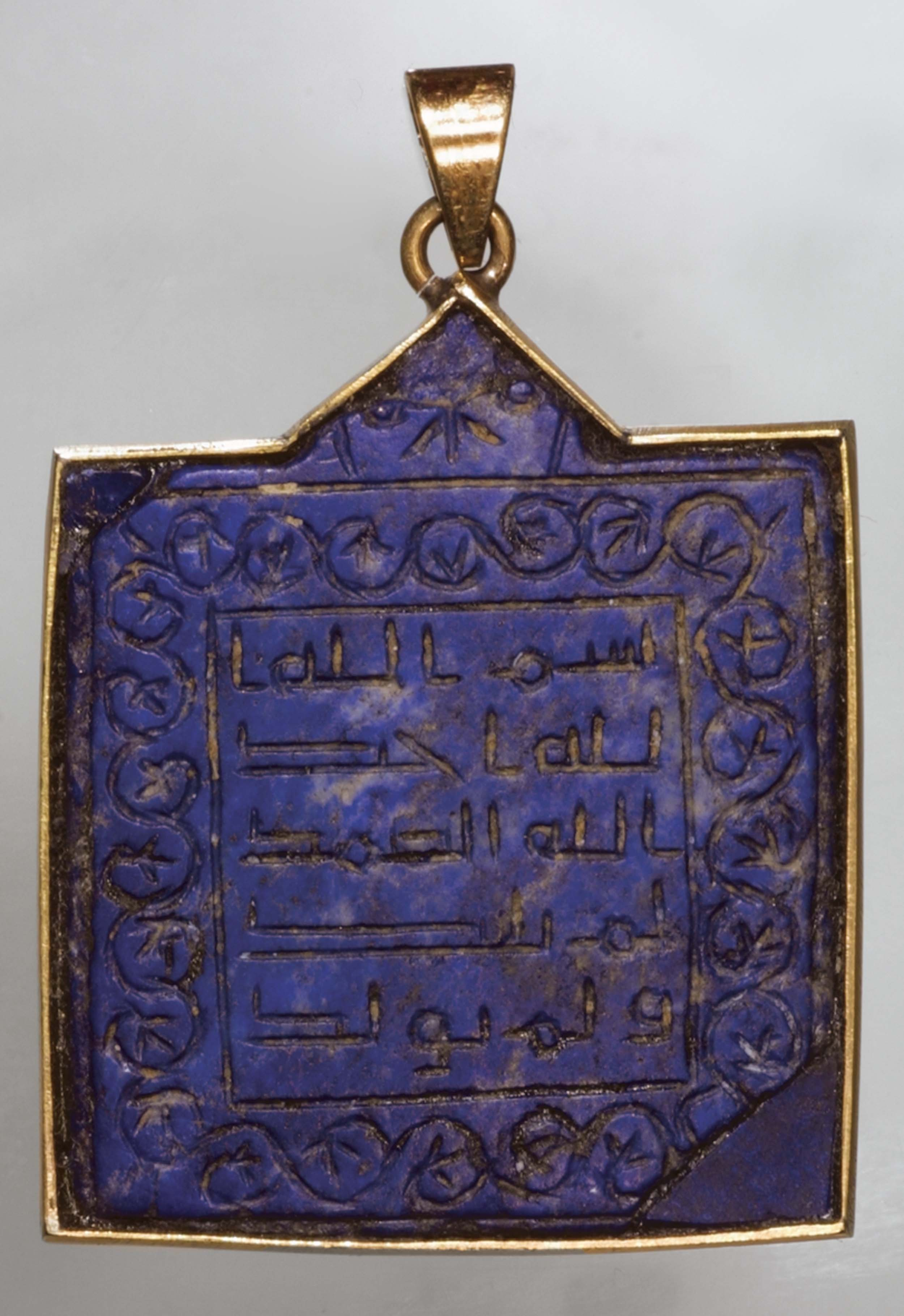
Islamic talisman engraved with a quote from the Quran, 7th or 8th century AD

Use of verses of the Qur'an in slips of parchment rolled inside talismanic objects has been common throughout the Muslim world, despite magic being discouraged by the religion.

The 10th century Abbasid mathematician, Thabit ibn Qurra, was considered to be an expert on talismans. In one of his texts on talismans, he wrote, 'The noblest part of astronomy is the science of talismans.' According to the 12th century translator John of Seville and Limia's version of ibn Qurra's Arabic text, De imaginibus, he saw talismans and astronomy to be more crucial for gaining wisdom than the studies of geometry and philosophy. In Adelard of Bath's translation of the same text, it is stressed that extensive knowledge of both astronomy and astrology is needed for creating a talisman. This information is necessary because talismans should be made at the moment of an auspicious celestial event. One's birth horoscope could also be a factor in the efficacy of talismans. The maker cannot have any distractions or doubts, otherwise their talisman will be powerless.

Adelard's translation specifies that to make a talisman which could earn love from a king, family member, or peer, one should use lead, iron, bronze, gold, or silver. To make a harmful talisman for creating conflicts between others, receiving money, defending or destroying a place, or winning a legal battle, one should use pitch and tar, bitumen, and aloes. An example of how to make a love talisman according to Ibn Qurra's book is as follows: Firstly, one must make sure it is the correct astrological time to perform this ritual because it is the eleventh place, or house, that is connected to friendship. Next, one must make a talisman of a man's figure during the specific astrological time, and with specific intention, and it must be engraved with the other person's name. Thirdly, one must make a second talisman, and it should be engraved with the name of the receiver of this love. After this, both the names and cognomina of each person should be engraved on both talismans. They must be positioned so that the names on each talisman touches the heart of the other talisman. Next in the process is to take a piece of unused parchment or cloth that has been purified with musk, ambergris, and camphor, and draw the 'rings' of the lords of the ascendant and eleventh place. The talismans must be purified with saffron, aloe-wood, and frankincense, and then folded in the previously prepared cloth or parchment. This purification process should be repeated for three consecutive nights. During this process, a specific prayer related to the maker's intention must be recited, and the individual must be bathed and have clean clothes.

== Uses of talismans ==
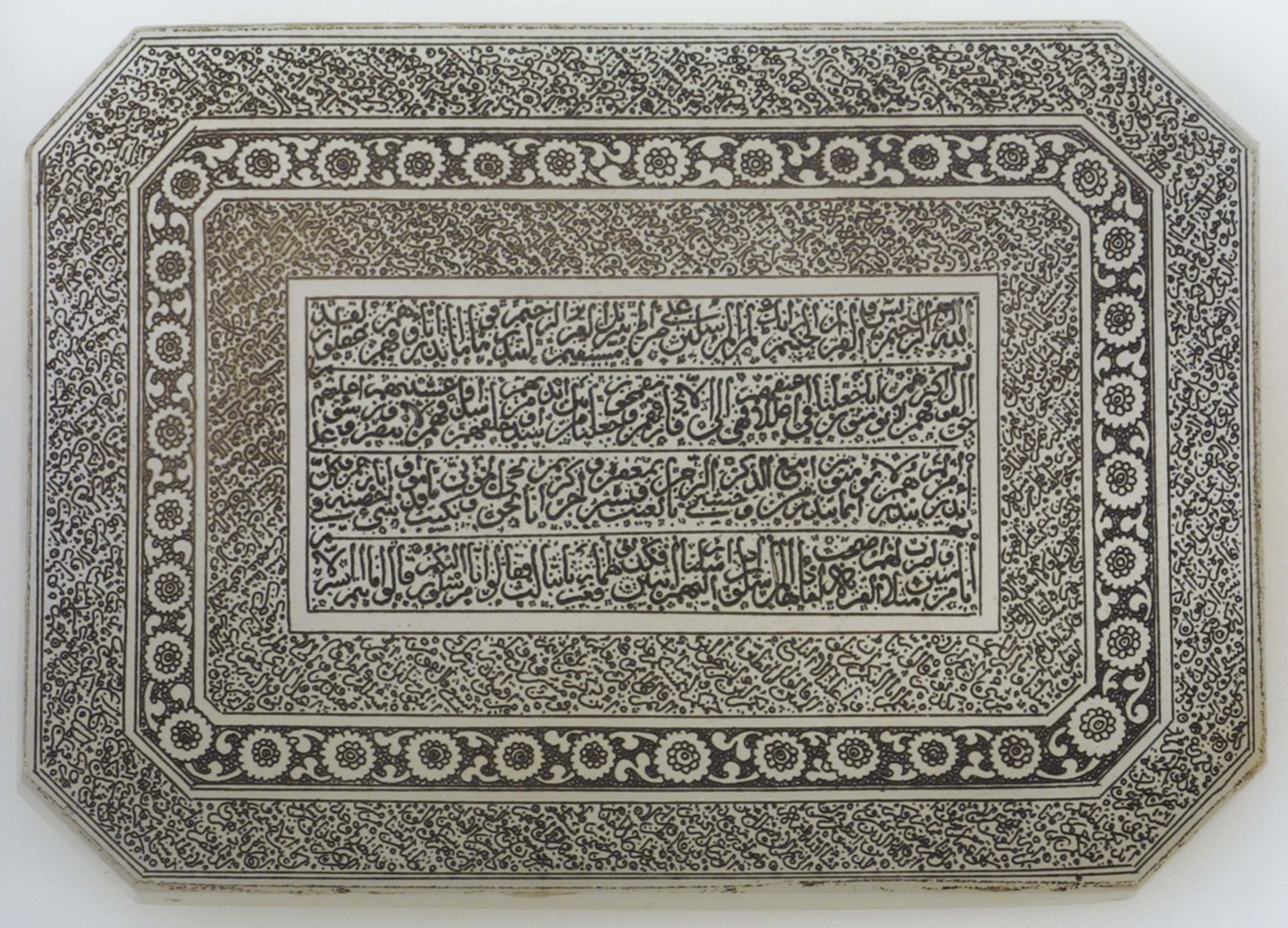
Polygonal talisman inscribed with micro-calligraphy, 17th century India

=== Islam ===
In the Islamic world, talismans were regularly employed for personal, social, political, and ideological reasons at both popular and elite levels. They function as a conduit for divine protection, which can involve both the attraction of positive energies to the wearer and the deflection of disease, danger and the evil eye. They may also be referred to as a hafiz, (protector) as well as a himala (pendant) often affixed to or suspended from the body, for example as a necklace, ring, talismanic shirt, or a small object within a portable pouch.

=== European medieval medicine ===
Lea Olsan writes of the use of amulets and talismans as prescribed by medical practitioners in the medieval period. She notes that the use of such charms and prayers was "rarely a treatment of choice" because such treatments could not be properly justified in the realm of Galen's medical teachings. Their use, however, was typically considered acceptable; references to amulets were common in medieval medical literature.

For example, one well-known medieval physician, Gilbertus, writes of the necessity of using a talisman to ensure conception of a child. He describes the process of producing this kind of talisman as "...writing words, some uninterruptible, some biblical, on a parchment to be hung around the neck of the man or woman during intercourse."

=== Islamic talismanic bowls ===
In medieval Islamic and broader Near Eastern traditions, sihr was understood in some contexts as a supernatural force associated with healing practices using charms and spells. Many bowls were inscribed with Quranic verses alongside text explaining what this bowl should be used to cure (i.e. colic, childbirth, a nosebleed etc.) as well as instructions of how to use it. The bronzed engraved "Magic Bowl" from Syria c. 1200 is an example of a dish used to ease childbirth as well as ease the sting of a scorpion and bite of a mad dog, according to the inscriptions on the inside of the bowl. Inscribed on this bowl are also suggestions that the person inflicted with the disease or bite, does not need to be the one to consume the liquid from the bowl. It could be taken by somebody around or associated to the inflicted person, but it does not mention how the magic is transferred to the person in need of help. This specific bowl was also used for barakah when the bowl was filled with water and sat overnight to absorb healing powers.

=== Pseudo-Aristotelian Hermetica ===
The Pseudo-Aristotelian Hermetica, a series of closely related Arabic texts attributed to Hermes Trismegistus and perhaps dating to the ninth century CE, explores the concept of ruhaniyyat, i.e., angels from the spiritual realm in the natural world, and how an individual can gain access to those forces. Text between Alexander the Great and Aristotle explores a variety of instructions of how to harness these spiritual forces through talismans, concoctions, amulets, and more that are each used for a designated purpose. Some instructions include placing a carved stone on top of a ring that is then placed on a dead black ram when Mars is in a specific degree of Scorpio and the moon is in Cancer. The dates of these texts are unknown; however, they were the basis of many mystical practices in the Islamic medieval world. The Pseudo-Aristotelian text Sirr al-Asrar offers more instructions, specifically with the "kings' talisman" which keeps harm away. It states that when there are certain astrological marks, a ruby red stone should be carved on a Thursday with a man with wings and a crown riding a lion with a flag, while six other hairless men bow under his hands. This should then be burned in an extensive ritual; afterwards, a ruhaniyyat will visit the practitioner in their dreams stating that the ritual was successful, and from there, the practitioner will repel snakes and scorpions.

== Examples ==
=== Zulfiqar ===
Zulfiqar, the magical sword of Ali, was frequently depicted on Ottoman flags, especially as used by the Janissary cavalry, in the 16th and 17th centuries.

This version of the complete prayer of Zulfiqar is also frequently invoked in talismans of the Qizilbash warriors:

شاه مردان، شیر یزدان، قدرت خدا، لا فتى إلا علي، لا سيف إلا ذو الفقار،	''Shah-e-Mardan, Sher-e-Yazdan, Qudrat-e-Khuda, Lafata illa Ali; La Saifa illa Zulfiqar.''	"Leader of men-at-arms, The lion of Yazdan (a name of God in Persian language ), Might by the most high (God), There is no man like Ali; No sword like Zulfiqar.

A record of Live like Ali, die like Hussein as part of a longer talismanic inscription was published by Tewfik Canaan in The Decipherment of Persian and sometimes Arabic Talismans (1938).

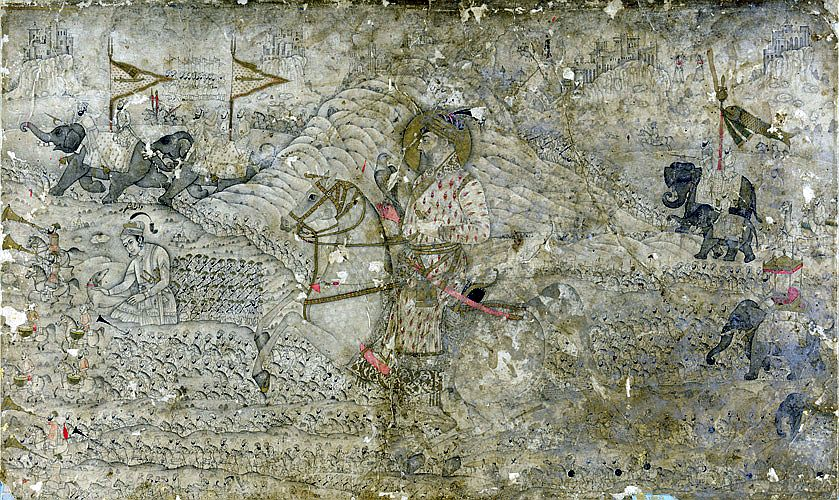
The Mughal Emperor Shah Jahan leading the Mughal Army. In the upper left, war elephants bear emblems of the legendary Zulfiqar.

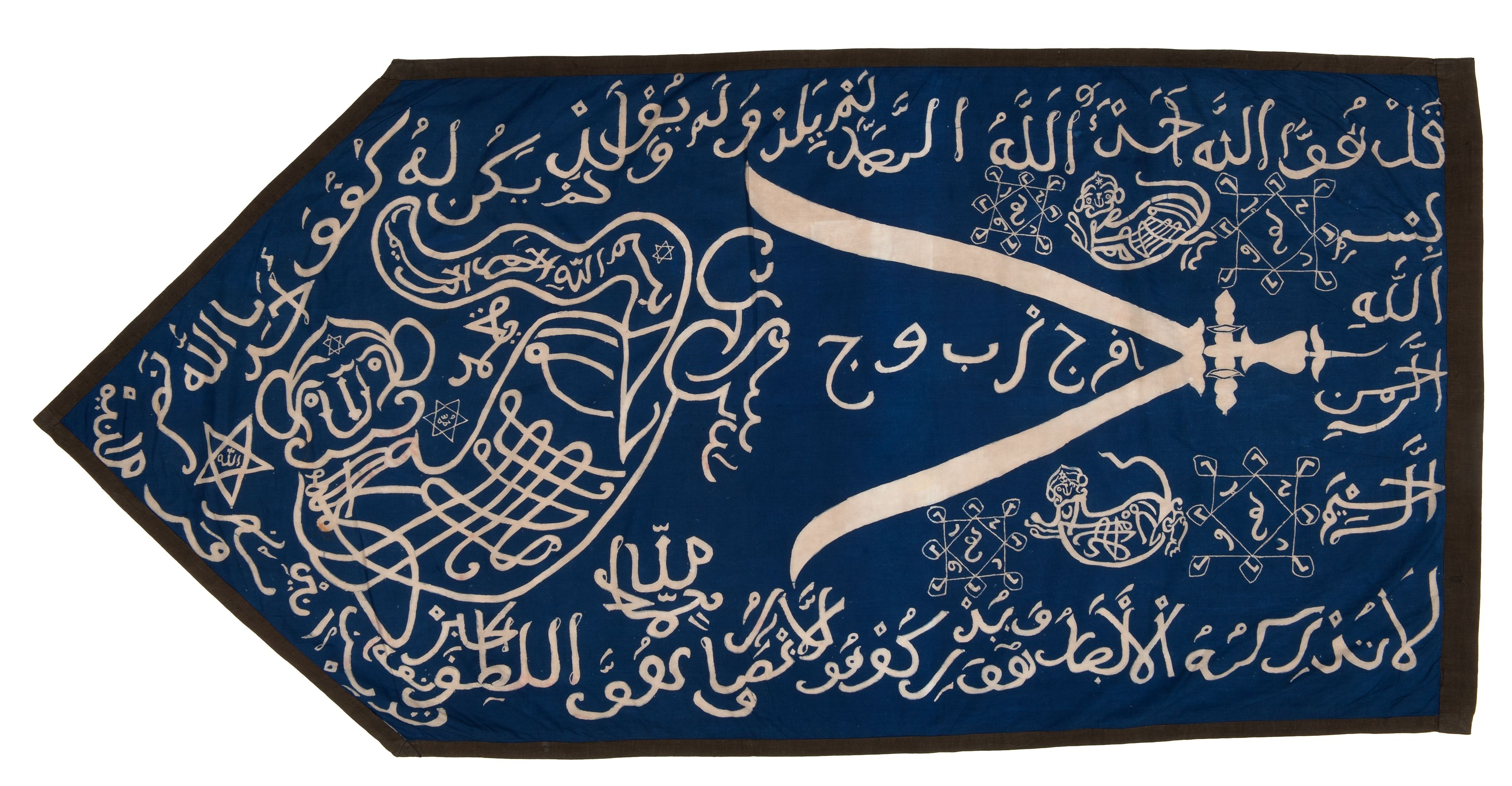
A flag from Cirebon with the Zulfiqar and Ali represented as a lion (dated to the late 18th or the 19th century).

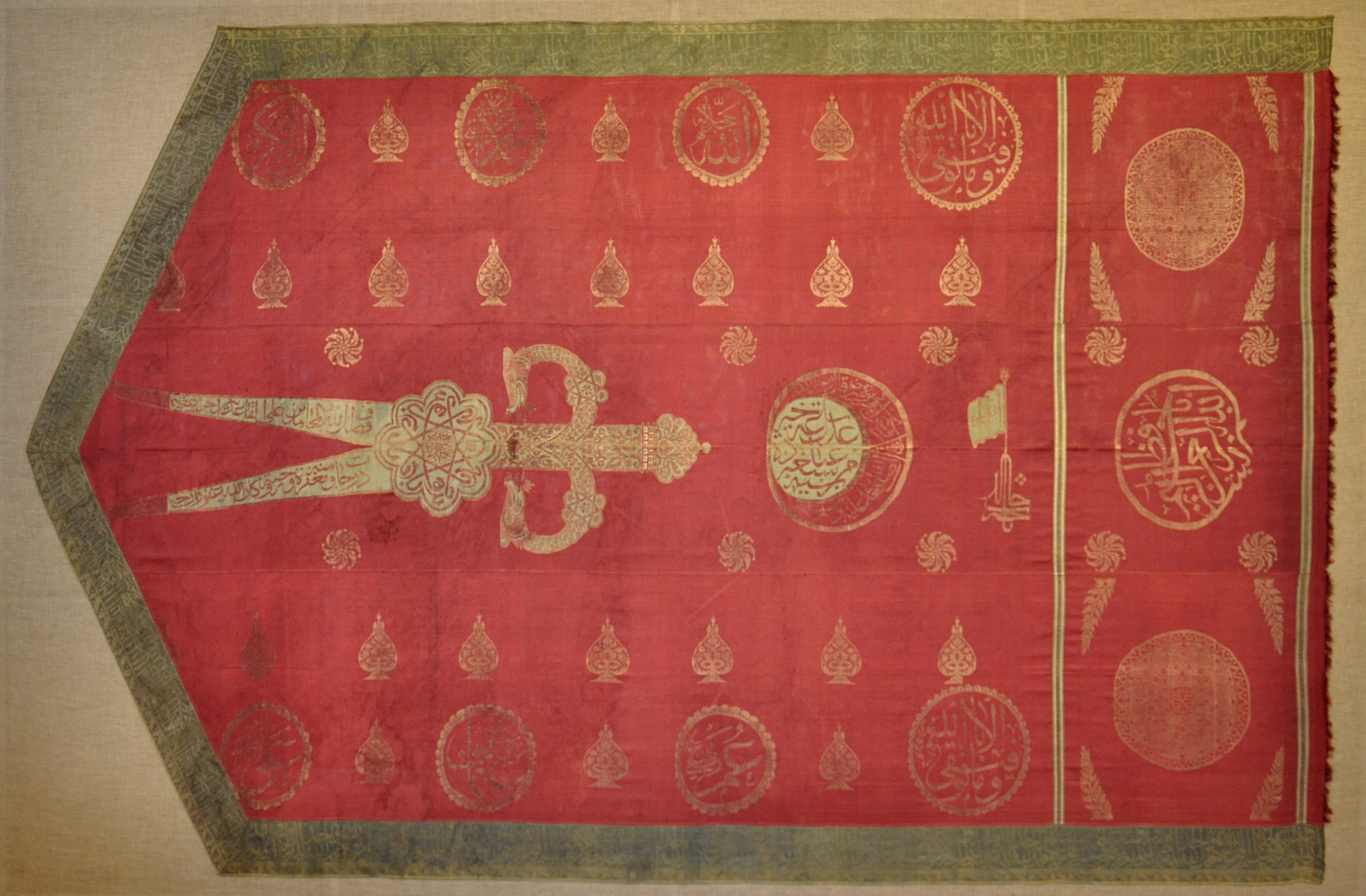
An early 19th century flag of Ottoman Zulfiqar.

=== Seal of Solomon ===
Seal of Solomon

The Seal of Solomon, also known as the interlaced triangle, is another ancient talisman and amulet that has been commonly used in several religions. Reputed to be the emblem by which King Solomon ruled the Genii, it could not have originated with him. Its use has been traced in different cultures long before the Jewish Dispensation. As a talisman it was believed to be all-powerful, the ideal symbol of the absolute, and was worn for protection against all fatalities, threats, and trouble, and to protect its wearer from all evil. In its constitution, the triangle with its apex upwards represents good, and with the inverted triangle, evil.

The triangle with its apex up was typical of the Trinity, figures that occur in several religions. In India, China and Japan, its three angles represent Brahma, Vishnu, and Shiva, who are considered in Hindu doctrine as the Creator, Preserver, and the Destroyer respectively. In ancient Egypt, it represented the deities Osiris, Isis and Horus. In Christianity, it represented the Holy Trinity. As a whole it stands for the elements of fire and spirit, composed of the three virtues (love, truth, and wisdom). The triangle with its apex downward symbolized the element of water, and typified the material world, or the three enemies of the soul: the world, the flesh, and the Devil, and the cardinal sins, envy, hatred and malice. Therefore, the two triangles interlaced represent the victory of spirit over matter. The early cultures that contributed to Western civilization believed that the Seal of Solomon was an all-powerful talisman and amulet, especially when used with either a Cross of Tau, the Hebrew Yodh, or the Egyptian Crux Ansata in the center.

=== Talismanic shirts ===
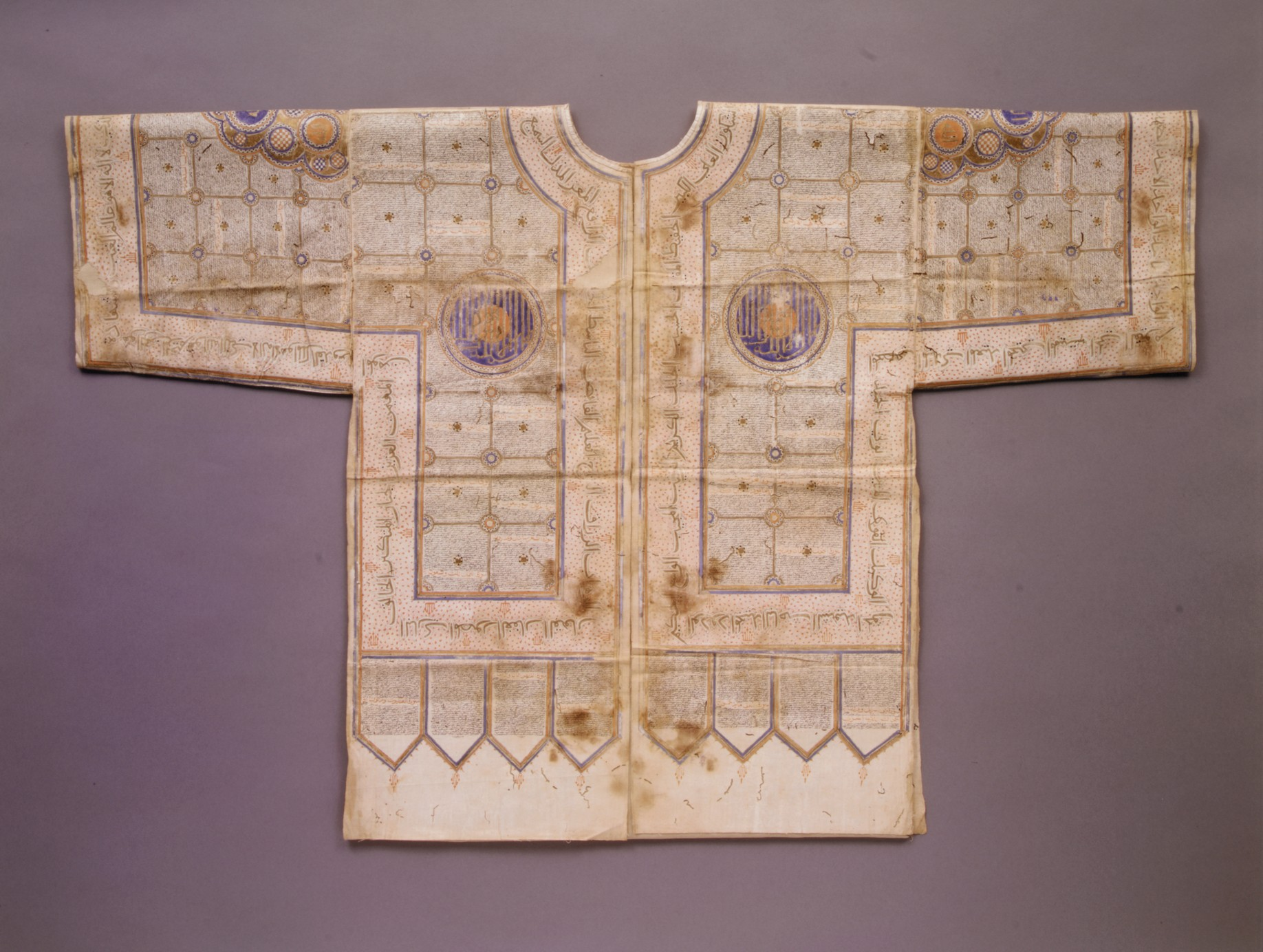
Talismanic shirt, 15th–early 16th century Northern India

Talismanic shirts are found throughout the Islamic world. The earliest surviving examples date from the 15th century, but the tradition is thought to pre-date that. The shirts may be inscribed with verses from Quran or names of Allah and of prophets. They may also carry images of holy sites or astrological symbols. The inscribed names are believed to offer protection and guidance to the carrier. Talismanic shirts were worn to protect against many evils; many were made to be worn under armour as an additional form of protection.

=== Swastika ===
The swastika, one of the oldest and most widespread talismans known, can be traced to the Stone Age, and has been found incised on stone implements of this era. It can be found in all parts of the Old and New Worlds, and on the most prehistoric ruins and remnants. In spite of the assertion by some writers that it was used by the Egyptians, there is little evidence to suggest they used it and it has not been found among their remains.

Both forms, with arms turned to the left and to the right, seem equally common. On the stone walls of the Buddhist caves of India, which feature many of the symbols, arms are often turned both ways in the same inscription.

=== Talismans in architecture ===
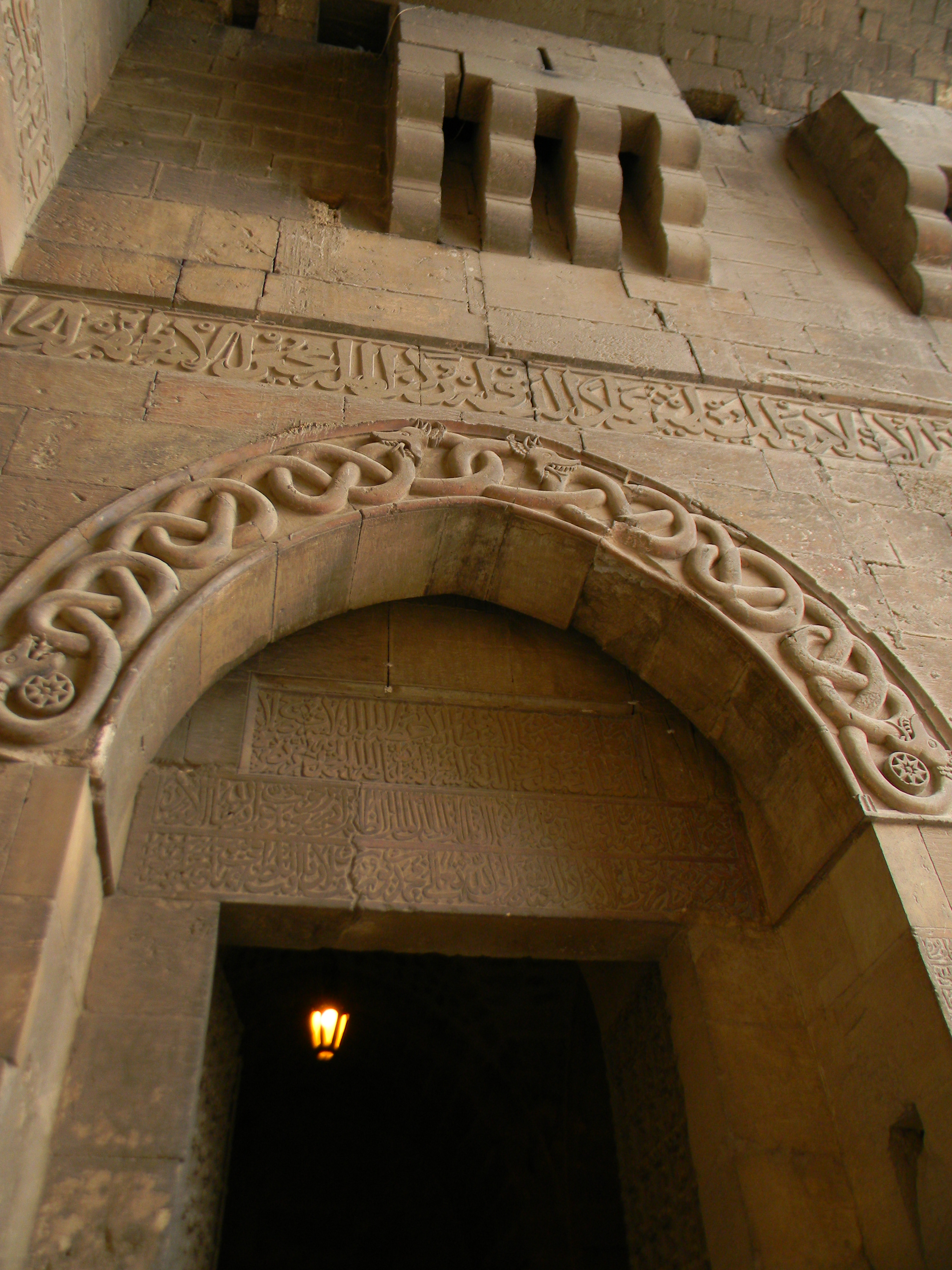
The Serpent's Gate

==== Uraniborg ====
The Renaissance scientific building Uraniborg has been interpreted as an astrological talisman to support the work and health of scholars working inside it, designed using Marsilio Ficino's theorized mechanism for astrological influence. Length ratios that the designer, the astrologer and alchemist Tycho Brahe, worked into the building and its gardens match those that Heinrich Cornelius Agrippa associated with Jupiter and the sun. This choice would have counteracted the believed tendency of scholars to be phlegmatic, melancholy and overly influenced by the planet Saturn.

==== The Serpent's Gate in the Citadel of Aleppo ====
The Serpent's Gate is a gate in the Aleppo Citadel that contains a talismanic relief depicting two serpents. The serpents are biting their own bodies and encircling stars. The serpents are believed to have protective powers against the enemies of the citadel.

==== Bab Al-Talsim ====
Bab al-Talsim, or the Talisman Gate, was a gate in Baghdad known for its talismanic inscriptions. The gate depicts two knotted serpents who are being held by a seated figure who is believed to be the Caliph. Just like the Serpent's Gate, the serpents are supposed to give protection against their enemies.

== See also ==
- Apotropaic magic – protective magic
- Charmstone
- Cross necklace
- Fulu
- Hamsa
- Holy water
- List of lucky symbols
- Mascot
- Rune
- Saining
- Skandola
