= Emerik Pavić =

Croatian writer and translator

Mirko Pavić and also Emericus Pavić (5 January 1716 – 15 April 1780) was a Croatian writer and translator from Hungary. He was a theological and philosophical writer, the author of the first work on aesthetics among Croats in Hungary, a Latinist, a translator, a historian, and in literature, he tried his hand at poetry and religious literature.

== Biography ==
Emerik (Mirko) Pavić was born in the northern Hungarian Danube region, in Buda (Croatian: Budim), in 1716, to a Bunjevac family. At the age of 18, he joined the Franciscan Order in the Franciscan Province of Bosnia in Srebrenica. He studied philosophy at the university in Buda, and theology in Buda and Osijek. He later taught the same subjects. He taught at the colleges in Baja and at the Studium Generale in Buda, where he was the most important person of the newly founded (1757) Franciscan Province of St. Ivan Kapistran and the monastery guardian in Buda. He later served as Secretary of the Province, and Visitator General in Bulgaria.

He is considered part of the Buda circle of Croatian Franciscan writers, together with Marijan Jaić, Mihovil Radnić, Matija Petar Katančić, Grgur Ćevapović, Grgur Peštalić, Lovro Bračuljević, Stjepan Vilov and others (many of whom were Bunjevci), who greatly contributed to the development of both Croatian and Serbian culture in Hungary in the 18th and early 19th century. Of all of them, it seemed that Stjepan Vilov influenced Pavić the most.

He belonged to the "Franciscan school" of late Jansenism and Renewed Catholicism, as well as a Franciscan from the same province, Ivan Velikanović

In the period from 1746 to 1780, he edited calendars, simple works which during the 18th and in the first half of the 19th century, which served to create a Serbo-Croatian readership, to develop reading habits among the socially and educationally lower classes, for whom they were the only book in the house and the only literary reading. Although it was believed that no copy of these Buda calendars had been preserved, the author Milovan Tatarin in his work A Forgotten Slavonian Calendar from the 18th Century sought to prove that the two calendars from 1766 and 1769 ostensibly were Pavić's work.

It is important for the history of both Serbian and Croatian education that he prepared a Serbo-Croatian primer, for Serbo-Croatian lexicography that he prepared a Serbo-Croatian dictionary, and for Serbian and Croatian pedagogy, it is important that he prepared a pedagogical manual.

In 1764, he published a textbook in the Štokavian dialect of the Croatian language

He is the author of the first manual of biblical history in the Serbo-Croatian language, The Mirror of the Foundations of the Source and Catholic Law from 1759, which he translated from German, and commissioned by the Roman Catholic Bishop of Pécs Đuro Klima. In 1778 he published the writings of the Reverend Father Goffine ... edited literature.

He is known as a person who promoted and sang the praises of the work of Andrija Kačić Miošić.

The Institute for the Culture of Vojvodina's Croats named his literary award, the Emerik Pavić Award, in his honor.

Serbian author Milorad Pavić traces his roots to Emerik Pavić of Budim.

== Sources ==
- Naco Zelić: Written Croatian word in Bačka today, Klasje nasih ravnih, no. 1-2 / 2003, p. 77.
- ZKVH Establishment of the award for the best book of the year "Emerik Pavić"
- Bosna Srebrena Higher education institutions in Buda
- Croatica Kht. Dinko Šokčević: History of Croats in Hungary
- Scrinia Slavonica, no. 1/2005. Franjo Emanuel Hoško: Croatian church historiography on the so-called late Jansenism in the ideological system of Josephinism
- Croatian plus Milovan Tatarin: The role of folk calendars in creating a Croatian readership
- Hrv. scientific bibliography Tatarin, Milovan: A Forgotten Slavonian Calendar from the 18th Century, Proceedings of the 33rd Day of the Hvar Theater: Silenced, Forbidden, Challenging in Croatian Literature and Theater, 2007
- Glas Koncila Ivan Dugandžić: Croatian Translations of the Bible
- Theological Review, no. 1-2 / 1985. Franjo Emanuel Hoško: The first manual of biblical history in the Croatian language translated by Emerik Pavić
