= Juraj Habdelić =

- Born: 17 April 1609; Staro Čiče, Habsburg monarchy
- Died: 27 November 1678 (aged 65); Zagreb, Kingdom of Croatia, Habsburg monarchy
- Occupations: writer, priest and linguist
- Notable work: Zrcalo marijansko Pervi oca naseg Adama greh

Juraj Habdelić (17 April or 27 November 1609 – 27 November 1678) was a Croatian lexicographer, writer and Jesuit priest.

== Biography ==
Born in Staro Čiče, his parents were Boldižar Habdelić and Margarita Kraljić. He went to gymnasium in Zagreb, studied philosophy in Graz and theology in Trnava. He worked as a teacher in Rijeka, Varaždin and Zagreb where he became the rector of Jesuit Collegium and manager of Seminary. During his rectorship, the gymnasium was attended by Pavao Ritter Vitezović who will, in his own way, continue the Habdelić's linguistic work, but on different foundations than those taught by the Jesuit gymnasium.

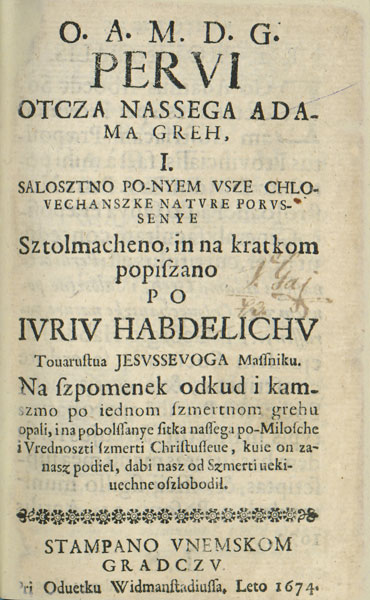
Cover of Habdelić's 1674 book Pervi otca našega Adama greh

Although Habdelić's prose does not really fit the modern definition of literature, his work is nevertheless powerful and fresh, especially in richness of the language he uses. His are the works of moral-didactic issues, the first of which was Zrcalo Marijansko (Mirror of Saint Mary) published in Graz in 1662.

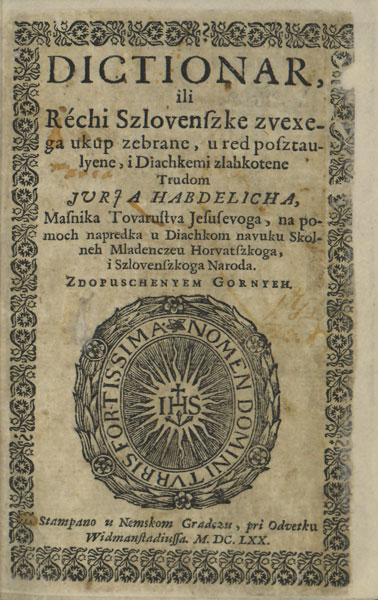
Dictionar, first edition from 1670

Christian morals is the main theme of Habdelić's literary work, but because a man is prone in violating these strict Christian norms and easily gives himself to sin, this is Habdelić's main literary preoccupation. His book intended for public uses, Prvi otca našeg Adama greh (First sin of our father Adam), published by Sacred Congregation for the Propagation of the Faith, had 1200 pages, and is a picture of man's fall and his tendency to sin. What is especially important is the ability of Habdelić to analyze through that main theme all parts of society: nobles, citizens, peasants, and he doesn't spare the clergy either.

Writing about the actual events in Croatia at that time (Zrinski-Frankopan conspiracy or Croatian and Slovenian peasant revolt led by Matija Gubec) he reveals himself as an upholder of the existing order. He considers the peasant rebellion as "volatility of the common people" and their tendency to chaotic behaviour, and the conspiracy as "arrogance of grand nobility".

Habdelić wrote in Kajkavian dialect and showed himself as an expert in the speech of commoners. At the same time he was opponent of common, profane things in which he also included folk songs, instructing his readers to discard "shameful, ungodly and impure songs".

With his work Dictionar ili reči slovenske (Dictionary or Slavic words) from 1670, he takes prominent, although layman, place in history of Croatian literature and linguistics. Namely, being without any special linguistic knowledge and writing for school papers he wrote Croatian-Latin dictionary. His total work is a mirror of Christian devotion with numerous examples from Jesuit and other religious literature but also a panoramic picture of Croatia in his time.

He died in Zagreb.
