= Croatian State Archives =

National archives of Croatia

Croatian State Archives Hrvatski državni arhiv (Croatian)
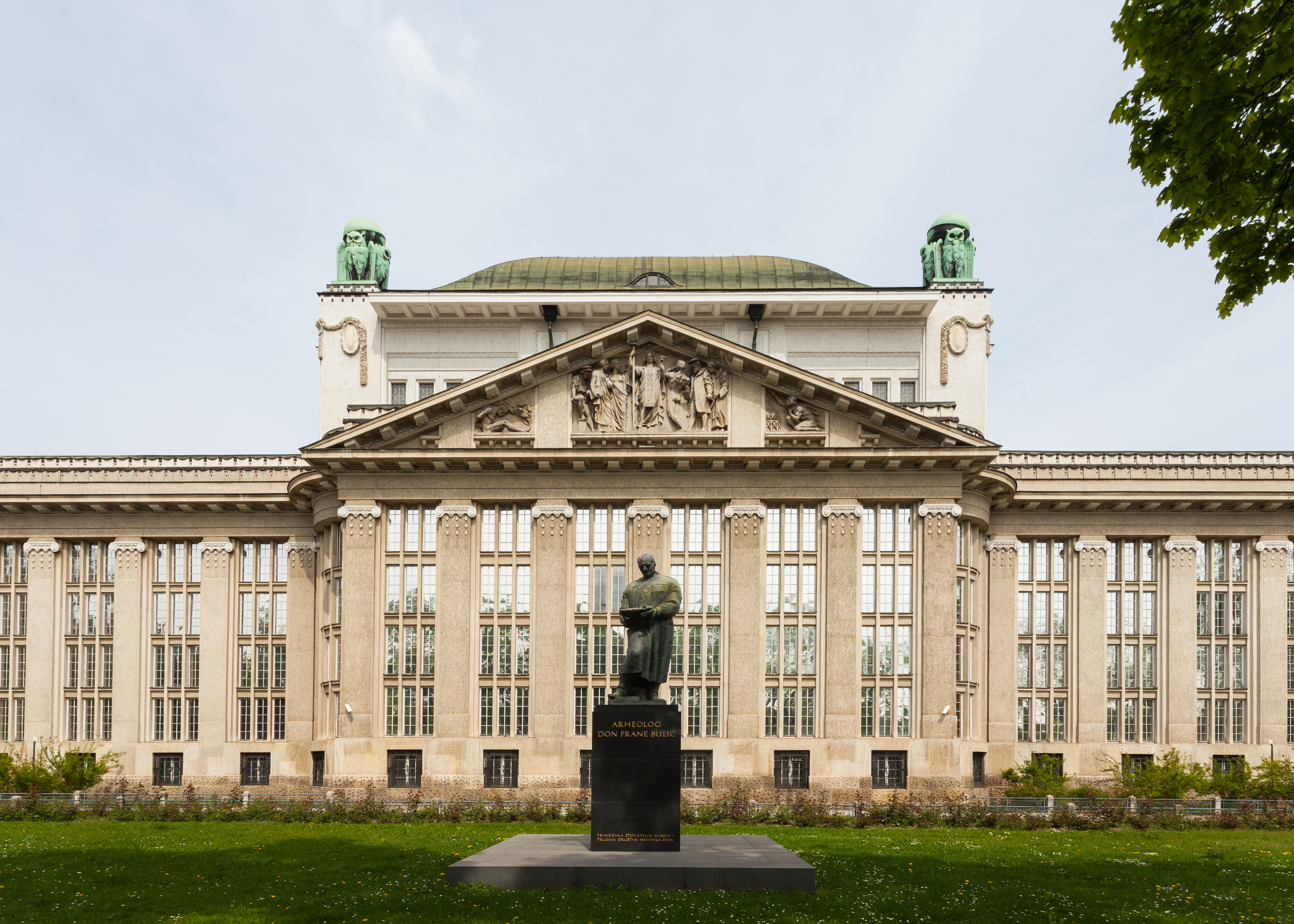
- Exterior view of the State Archives building
- Interactive map of Croatian State Archives; Hrvatski državni arhiv (Croatian)
- 45.8061°N 15.9702°E
- Location: Marulićev trg 21, 10000 Zagreb, Zagreb, Croatia
- Website: Official website

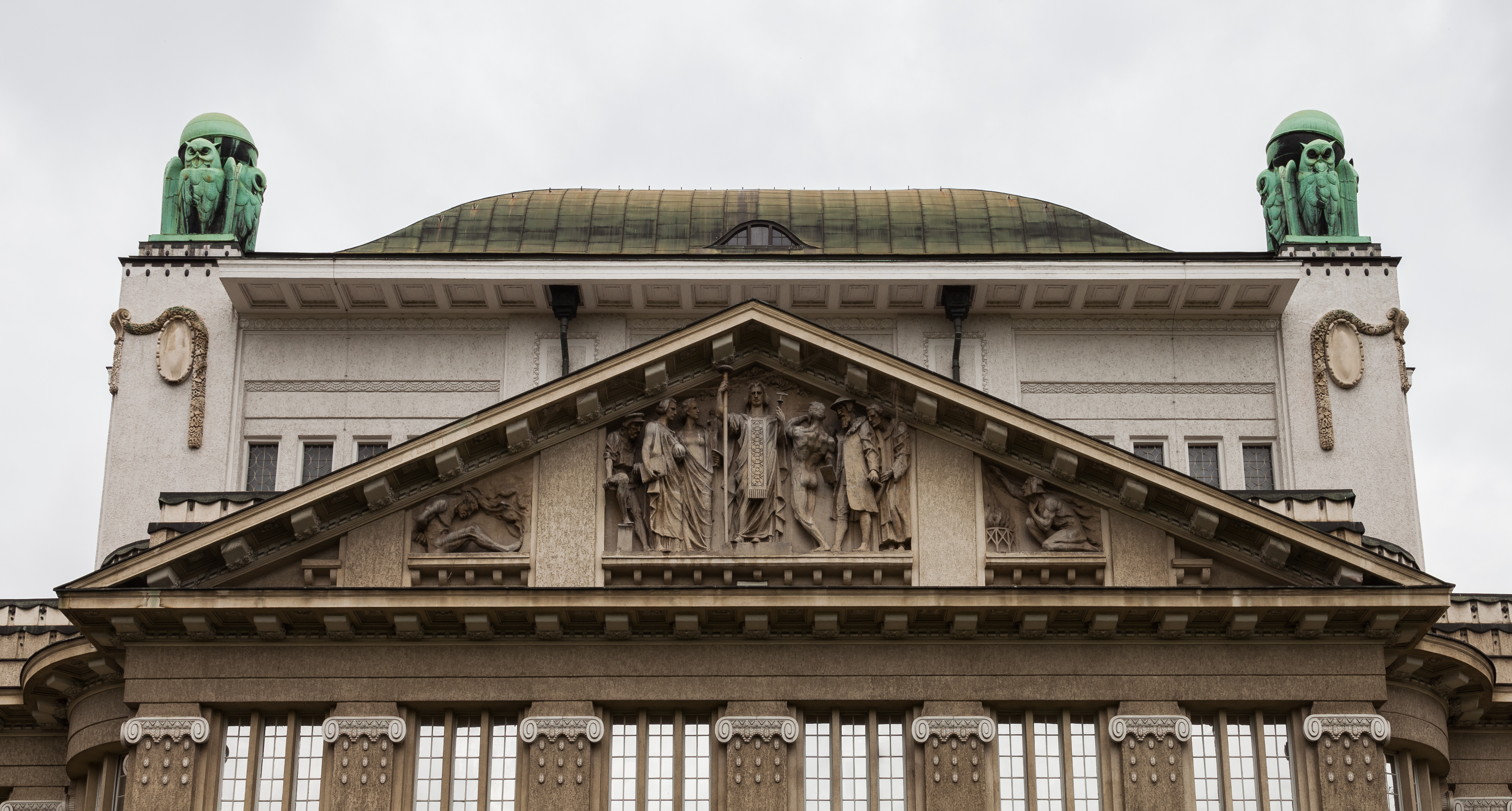
Detail of the pediment of the Croatian State Archives building.

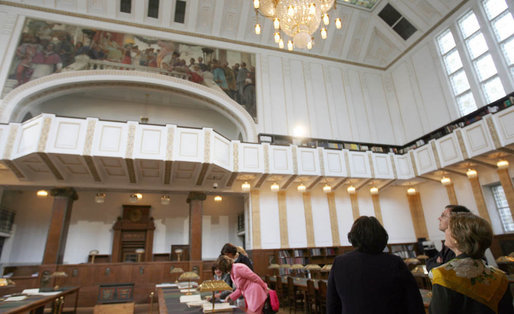
Mrs. Laura Bush views a large wall mural on April 5, 2008, during her tour at the Croatian State Archives.

The Croatian State Archives (Croatian: Hrvatski državni arhiv) are the national archives of Croatia located in its capital, Zagreb. The history of the state archives can be traced back to the 17th century. There are also regional state archives located in Bjelovar, Dubrovnik, Gospić, Karlovac, Osijek, Pazin, Rijeka, Sisak, Slavonski Brod, Split, Varaždin, Vukovar and Zadar.

The archives have more than 29,000 records, with the oldest ones being from the years 999-1089. They store records that were made due to the activities of governmental central bodies, cultural, educational, military, and health institutions, administration of justice, and Croatian immigrants, as well as records that were made by distinguished families and individuals.

== History ==
The Croatian State Archives trace their origin to a 1643 decision of the Croatian Sabor in which the Kingdom's treasurer (blagajnik) Ivan Zakmardi is instructed to create an inventory of all the laws, charters and other documents. This was followed by the commission to construct a special chest at the Kingdom's expense which would house the most important documents in the aforementioned inventory. They were formally established in 1870 as part of the government of the Kingdom of Croatia-Slavonia, a constituent kingdom of Austria-Hungary, and became Croatia's main state archives after 1945.

The special chest of documents created by the Croatian Parliament's 1643 decision was originally placed in the Zagreb Kaptol, and moved in 1764 to the Assembly hall of the National House.

== See also ==
- National Library of Croatia
- List of archives in Croatia
- List of national archives
- Croatian Film Archive
