= City Museum of Vinkovci =

- Gradski muzej Vinkovci
- City Museum of Vinkovci Logo
- Established: 1946; 80 years ago
- Location: Trg bana Josipa Šokčevića 16, Vinkovci, Croatia
- Coordinates: 45°17′17″N 18°48′13.5″E
- Type: History museum
- Collection size: 27,000 inventoried objects
- Founder: Ministry of Education of the People’s Republic of Croatia via Decision 77286-V3-1946
- Director: Hrvoje Vulić
- Owner: City of Vinkovci
- Website: muzejvk.hr

The City Museum of Vinkovci (Croatian: Gradski muzej Vinkovci), founded in 1946, is a municipal institution dedicated to the research, preservation, and presentation of historical objects and artifacts related to the history of Vinkovci and its surrounding region. The museum is located in the city centre, in the late 18th-century Palace of the General Command building, overlooking the Ban Josip Šokčević Square.

Alongside Vinkovci, the museum's work and collection covers areas of neighbouring municipalities of Nuštar, Jarmina, Markušica, Tordinci, Ivankovo, Vođinci, Stari Mikanovci, Andrijaševci, Privlaka, Otok, Nijemci, Tovarnik and Stari Jankovci.

== Building ==
Since 1950 City Museum of Vinkovci is located inside the Palace of the General Command of the 7th Brod Regiment of the Slavonian Military Frontier. The building, constructed in 1775, is itself a protected cultural property listed in the Register of Cultural Goods of the Republic of Croatia (Z-1172), having been entered on 28 November 1972. Located at the central Ban Josip Šokčević Square, the structure occupies a prominent corner position facing the main road. It was originally built as an administrative building in the style of Military Frontier Baroque architecture.

The building is a single-storey rectangular brick structure with a high hipped roof. The main façade includes an arcaded portico, and the windows are rectangular with semi-circular upper sections and simple plaster frames. The façade is further articulated with shallow pilaster strips, while a cornice separates the upper level.

In addition to the main building, the museum operates across several other facilities in the city centre, including exhibition, storage, and administrative spaces, as well as the Slavko Kopač Gallery of Fine Arts located in Duga Street.

== History ==
=== Before 1946 ===
The Vinkovci area has a rich archaeological and historical heritage with continuous human settlement from the Neolithic period through classical antiquity, the Middle Ages, the Ottoman period, and into the modern and contemporary era. This long continuity, combined with the city’s historical role as an important centre for military deployment within the Slavonian Military Frontier, contributed to a local tradition of amateur artifact collecting, which in some cases contributed to damage to archaeological sites.

From the 1920s onwards, Matija Klajn, a hospital employee from Vinkovci, played a particularly significant role as an amateur archaeologist. He systematically collected archaeological and historical objects across the region between the Bosut and Danube rivers, often conducting fieldwork in villages and marshland areas. Klajn later became associated with the museum and one of its directors, where he contributed to the organization, cataloguing, and preservation of its early collections. He advocated for the retention of locally discovered artifacts within Vinkovci and opposed their transfer to larger institutions.

In addition to private collectors from Vinkovci and elsewhere, a significant collection was assembled at the Matija Antun Reljković Gymnasium. Among local collectors, Mato Medojević was also particularly notable, having gathered a collection of 1,639 artifacts. In 1942, during World War II in Yugoslavia and the existence of the Independent State of Croatia, his collection was purchased for 150,000 kuna by an authorized municipal representative, a sum that was largely symbolic at the time.

The collection suffered significant damage and mismanagement during the war. The city of Vinkovci was liberated on 13 April 1945 by Yugoslav Partisans units. Medojević's collection was afterwards recovered and reorganized by Marko Samarđija, director of gymnasium, who preserved it at the school.

=== 1946-1991 ===
City authorities adopted a formal decision to establish the museum on 2 November 1946 and to grant the preserved collection to the new public institution. This decision was confirmed by the Ministry of Education of the People’s Republic of Croatia on 7 November 1946, and Marko Samarđija was appointed the first director. Mira Benaković, a museum curator, was appointed director on 16 November 1947. The first permanent exhibition was opened at the old building of Vjeresijska Bank in 1948.

In 1950, the museum was relocated from the gymnasium to the part of the Palace of the General Command. Following substantial adaptation, the first permanent exhibition was opened in 1952 under the title “Man the Hunter and Fisherman”, presenting material from prehistory to 1945. Croatian archaeologist Ivana Iskra-Janošić was named main museum curator in 1968 and in 1970 she became director, a position she will keep until 1991 and the beginning of the Croatian War of Independence. Slavko Kopač Gallery of Fine Arts was established in 1966 in the building across the street from the main museum building. In 1976 museum was awarded the City of Vinkovci Award With a Silver Plaque by the Municipal Assembly of Vinkovci on the occasion of the 13 April Liberation Day celebrations.

In 1981 the museum was given the whole building of the Palace of the General Command. That same year, the ethnographic section in the village of Slakovci was opened. In 1983, a separate permanent exhibition dedicated to the World War II period was opened on the ground floor of the building. By 1986, when the institution was temporarily closed, it had recorded a total of 418,171 visitors since its establishment. The permanent exhibitions were closed in 1986 due to structural damage to the building, and partial renovation was completed in 1990.

=== Since 1991 ===
Due to the escalation of the Croatian War of Independence in 1991 in the region, most of the City Museum of Vinkovci’s collection was relocated to a safer location and stored at the City Museum of Varaždin between 1991 and 1997, until the end of the United Nations Transitional Administration for Eastern Slavonia, Baranja and Western Sirmium mission in eastern Croatia. According to museum documentation, the evacuation included the most valuable parts of the archaeological, ethnological, historical, and numismatic collections, as well as parts of the documentation and library holdings. Some materials were also stored temporarily at additional locations in Vinkovci. The museum building sustained damage during the war, including damage to the roof structure, façade, and window openings as a result of shelling.

In 2011, the City Museum of Vinkovci signed a cooperation agreement with the Sombor City Museum, providing for the exchange of experts, exhibitions, publications, and joint projects. On 4 December 2023 Ministry of Culture and Media awarded 678,044.66 € from the Next Generation EU for the energy renovation of the Gallery of Slavko Kopač building which operates as a part of the museum.

== Collection ==
The museum is organized into four collections: the archaeological collection, the natural history collection, the historical collection, and the ethnographic collection. Before Croatian War of Independence there was also special collection dedicated to World War II National Liberation Struggle in the region. Alongside these, part of the museum are two conservation workshops and library.

=== Archaeological Collection ===
Archaeological material was a central motivator for the establishment of the public local museum in Vinkovci. The archaeological collection comprises material ranging from the Paleolithic period to the 14th century, including palaeontological and osteological finds, prehistoric artefacts, material from the Roman period, the Migration Period, and the Middle Ages. It also includes a numismatic collection containing Roman and Ottoman coins. From the 1970s onwards, objects were increasingly acquired through systematic archaeological excavations. Since Vinkovci has been designated a protected archaeological site since 1972, most construction activities in the area have been preceded by archaeological investigations, which have significantly contributed to the growth of the collection.

=== Natural History Collection ===
The Natural History Collection began to take shape following the museum’s relocation to its current building between 1950 and 1952. Its establishment was supported by local forestry institutions. The initial holdings included wooden objects found in the entrance area of the building, as well as palaeontological specimens recovered from clay deposits at the Dilj brick factory.

Additional material was acquired through donations from hunters and nature enthusiasts. Early displays also featured issues of forestry journals, particularly those containing works by Josip Kozarac. Among the more notable items were a herbarium of Slavonian plant specimens and a collection of deer antlers. The Forestry Museum in Belgrade contributed a valuable collection of historical photographs of Slavonian oak forests.

=== Historical Collection ===
The Historical Collection includes a wide range of material related to the social, economic, and cultural history of Vinkovci and its surroundings. Notable items include historical maps of the city, examples of measuring systems, tools associated with various crafts, a gymnasium bell, a printing press, drawings of Military Frontier uniforms, and a variety of guild and trade documents.

The museum also assembled a substantial body of archival material. Until 1983, it advocated for the retention of locally relevant documentation in Vinkovci rather than its transfer to State Archives in Osijek. This contributed to the establishment of a branch archival collection in the city, which assumed custody of a significant portion of the museum’s documentation. These holdings later formed an important part of the archival collections of the State Archives in Vukovar still predominantly kept in Vinkovci.

=== Ethnographic Collection ===
The ethnographic collection began to develop more systematically in the 1970s with the employment of professionally trained ethnologists. Among the early staff were Nada Pisac (1970), Ljiljana Šarlah (1971–1972), and Branka Šprem Lovrić (1976–1978), who together worked at the museum for a relatively short period but contributed to the initial formation of the collection. A more sustained ethnographic work began with the arrival of ethnologist Ljubica Gligorević in 1979 who remained at the museum on a permanent basis.

In 1981, a local ethnographic unit was established in the village of Slakovci on the initiative of a local teacher, Mate Ivančić. The collection there was formed largely through contributions from local residents. In October 1996, the museum participated in a joint field survey with the State Directorate for the Protection of Cultural and Natural Heritage, documenting the condition of traditional cultural monuments in the villages of Lipovac, Apševci, and Podgrađe, then under the administration of the UNTAES over the Eastern Slavonia, Baranja and Western Syrmia.

=== World War II National Liberation Struggle Collection (1983-1991) ===
Many local museums in the former Socialist Federal Republic of Yugoslavia maintained dedicated collections focused on the history of the World War II resistance movement. In Vinkovci, a separate section devoted to this theme was established in 1983, while prior to that it had been covered within the Historical Collection. Following partial renovation of the building in 1990 and the subsequent evacuation of the museum’s holdings in 1991, the institution reopened only in 1997, at which point the separate National Liberation Struggle collection was no longer maintained.

== Directors ==
- Marko Samarđija (1946–1947)
- Mira Benaković (1947–1950)
- Matija Klajn (1950–1962)
- Slavko Puškar (1962–1968)
- Dionizije Švagelj (1968–1970)
- Ivana Iskra Janošić (1970–1991)
- Stjepan Jozić (1991–2011)
- Danijel Petković (2011–2019)
- Hrvoje Vulić (since 2019)

== See also ==
- Museum of Slavonia
- Vinkovci Treasure
