= List of archives in Croatia =

This is list of archives in Croatia.

== Archives in Croatia ==
- Croatian State Archives
- State Archives in Bjelovar
- State Archives in Dubrovnik
- State Archives in Gospić
- State Archives in Karlovac
- State Archives in Međimurje
- State Archives in Osijek
- State Archives in Pazin
- State Archives in Rijeka
- State Archives in Sisak
- State Archives in Slavonski Brod
- State Archives in Split
- State Archives in Šibenik
- State Archives in Varaždin
- State Archives in Virovitica
- State Archives in Vukovar
- State Archives in Zadar
- State Archives in Zagreb
- Croatian Memorial-Documentation Center of the Homeland War
- Archive of Serbs in Croatia
- Archive of the Croatian Academy of Sciences and Arts
- Croatian Film Archive
- Audiovisual Archive of Croatian Radiotelevision

=== Religious communities ===
- Archdiocesan Archive of Rijeka
- Archive of the Evangelical Church in Zagreb
- Archiepiscopal Archive in Split
- Archdiocesan Archive in Zadar
- Archiepiscopal Archive in Zagreb
- Diocesan Archive of Dubrovnik
- Diocesan Archive of Križevci
- Diocesan Archive of Krk
- Diocesan Archive of Poreč
- Diocesan Archive of Hvar
- Diocesan Archive of Šibenik
- Diocesan Archive of Đakovo
- Museum and Archive of the Metropolitanate of Zagreb and Ljubljana

== See also ==
- List of archives
- Libraries in Croatia
- List of museums in Croatia
- Culture of Croatia
