= Sponza Palace =

16th-century palace in Dubrovnik, Croatia

Coordinates: 42.6411°N 18.1106°E

- Palača Sponza
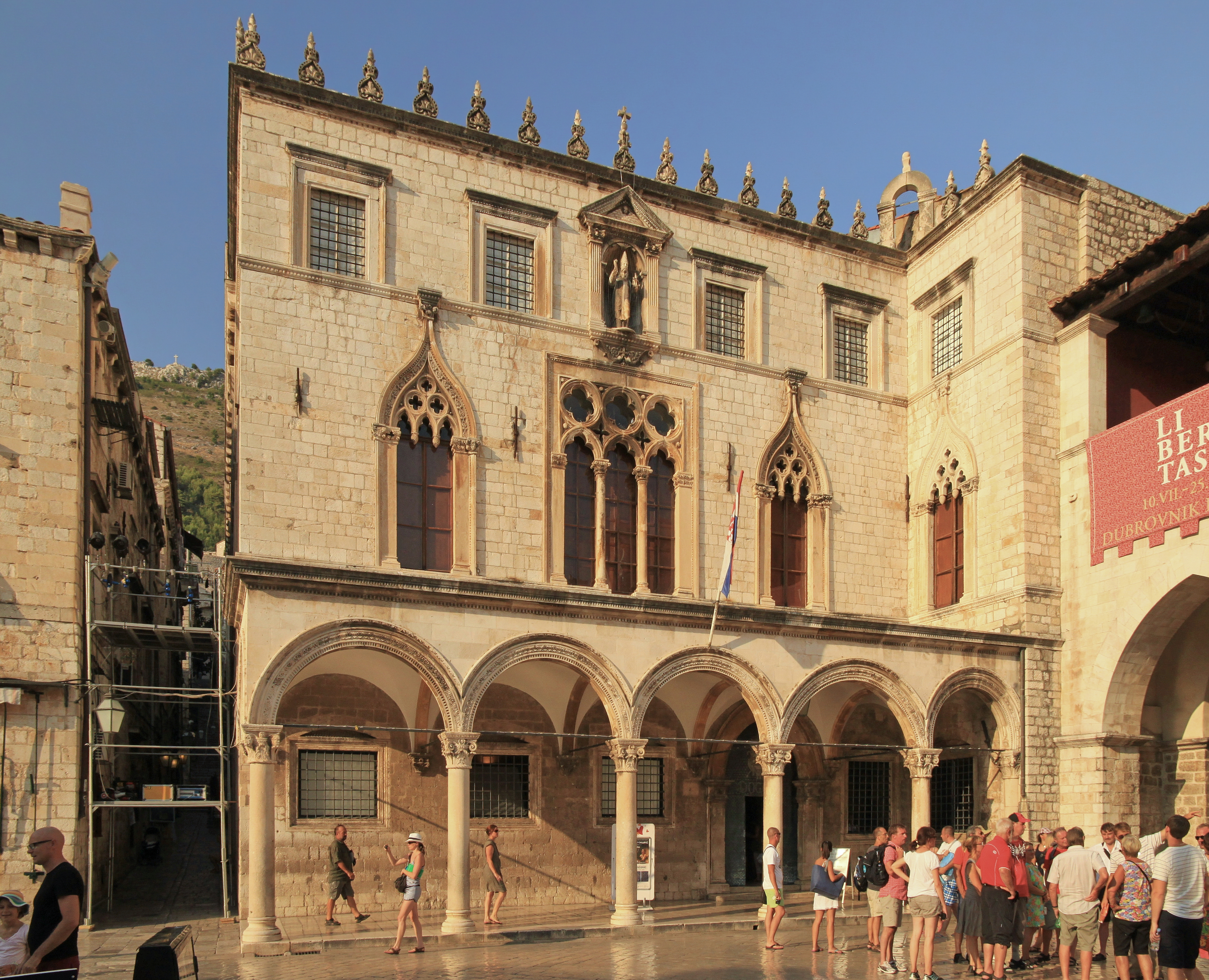
- Sponza Palace in Dubrovnik
- Interactive map of the Sponza Palace area
- Former names: Divona

General information
- Architectural style: Gothic and Renaissance
- Location: Dubrovnik, Croatia
- Current tenants: State Archives in Dubrovnik
- Construction started: 1516
- Completed: 1522; 504 years ago
- Owner: City of Dubrovnik

Design and construction
- Architect: Paskoje Miličević Mihov

The Sponza Palace (Croatian: Palača Sponza; Italian: Palazzo Sponza), also called Divona (from dogana, customs), is a 16th-century palace in Dubrovnik, Croatia. Its name is derived from the Latin word "spongia", the spot where rainwater was collected.

The rectangular building with an inner courtyard was built in a mixed Gothic and Renaissance style between 1516 and 1522 by Paskoje Miličević Mihov. The loggia and sculptures were crafted by the brothers Andrijić and other stonecutters.

The palace has served a variety of public functions, including as a customs office and bonded warehouse, mint, armoury, treasury, bank and school. It became the cultural center of the Republic of Ragusa with the establishment of the Academia dei Concordi, a literary academy, in the 16th century. It survived the 1667 earthquake without damage. The palace's atrium served as a trading center and business meetingplace. A Latin inscription on an arch testifies to this public function:

Fallere nostra vetant et falli pondera. Meque pondero cum merces ponderat ipse deus.
"Our weights do not permit cheating. When I measure goods, God measures with me."

The palace is now home to the Dubrovnik State Archive, which holds documents dating back to the 12th century, the earliest from 1022. These files, including more than 7000 volumes of manuscripts and about 100,000 individual manuscripts, were previously kept in the Rector's palace.

The Luža square in front of the palace is used for the opening ceremony of the Dubrovnik Summer Festival. Sponza Palace itself is also used as a performance venue.

The palace's atrium is the basis of the "Sponza Atrium" 3D computer graphics model, created for a rendering contest and now a widely used reference model for global illumination rendering.

== Gallery ==
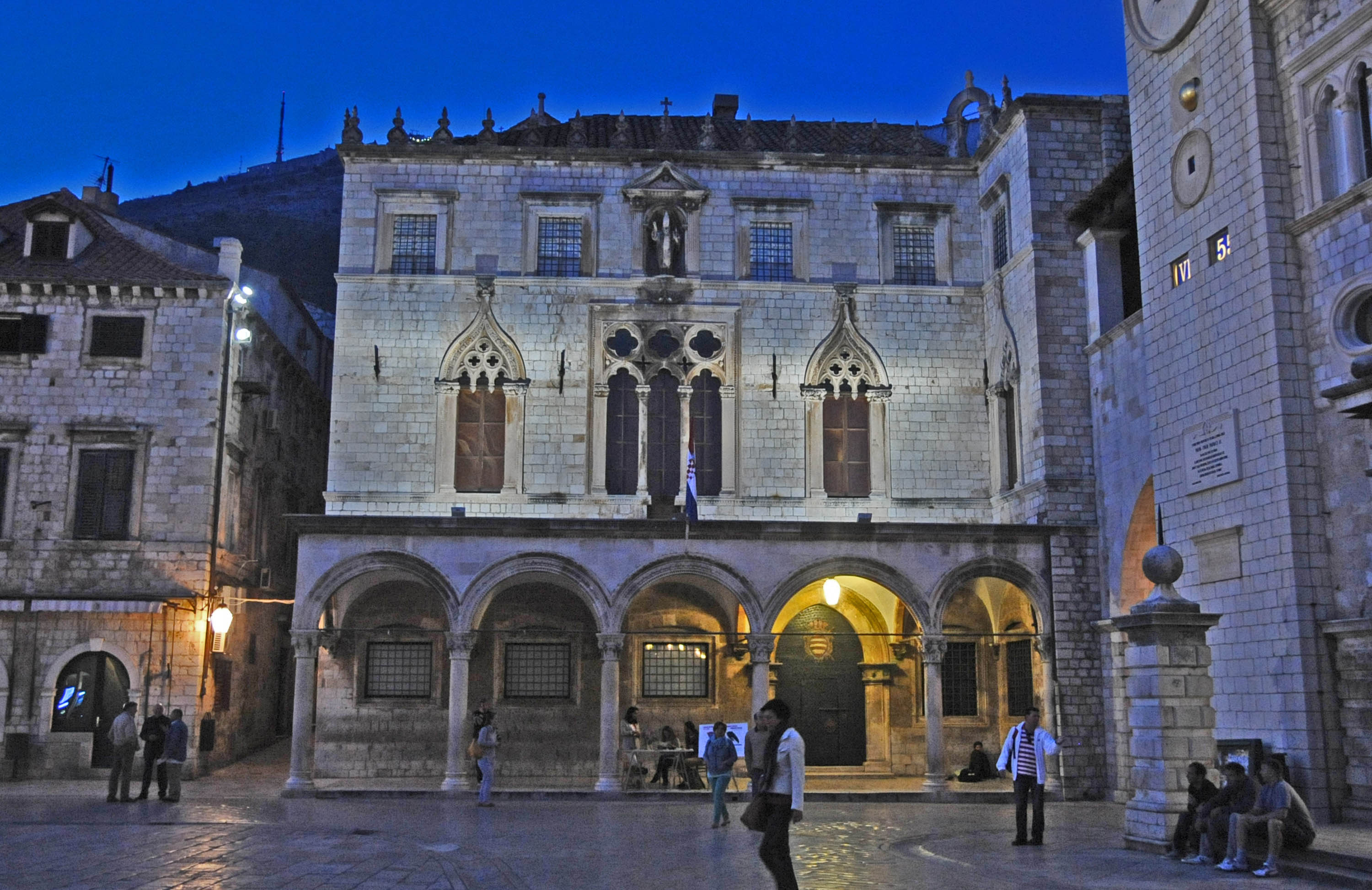
Palace at dusk

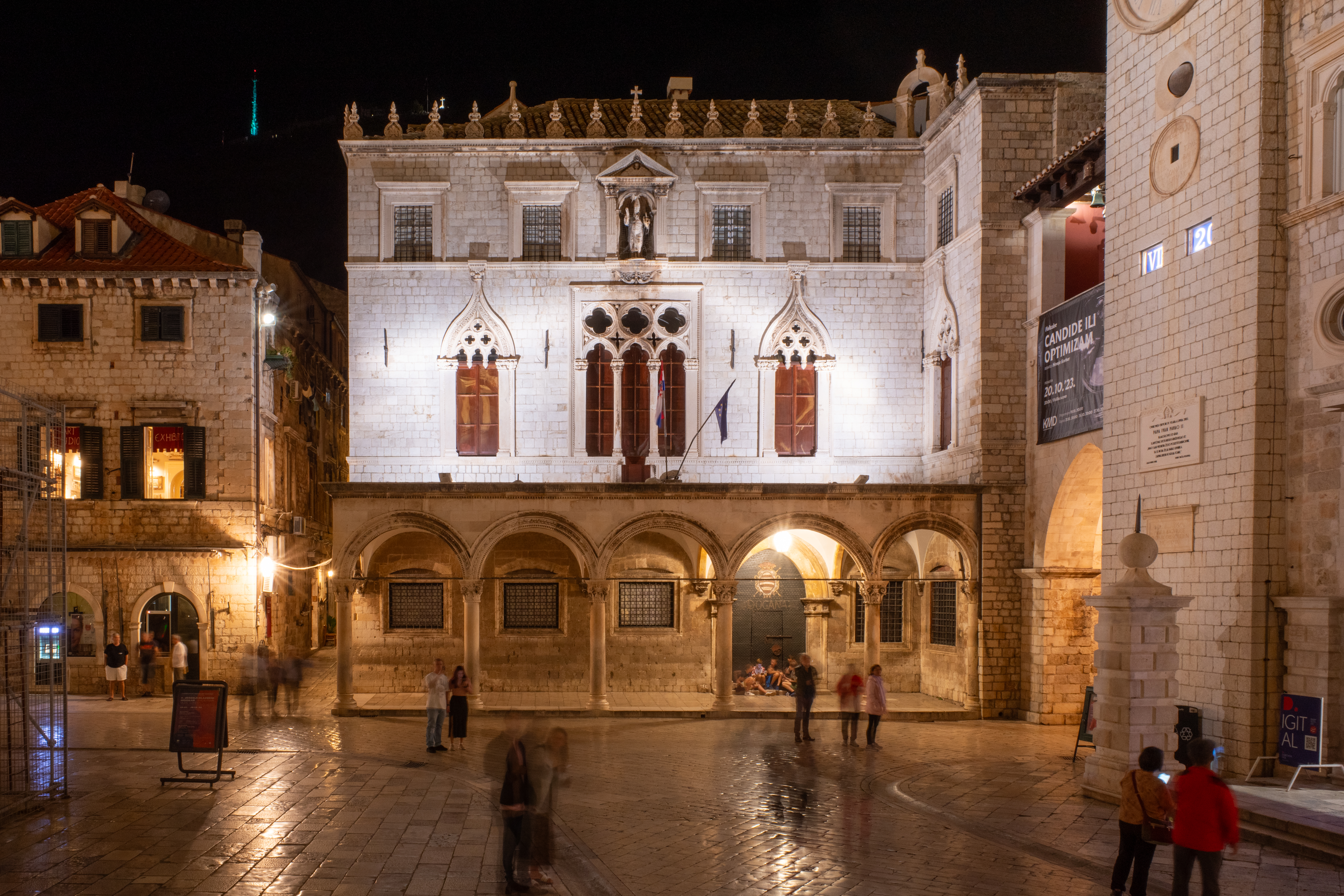
Sponza Palace at night

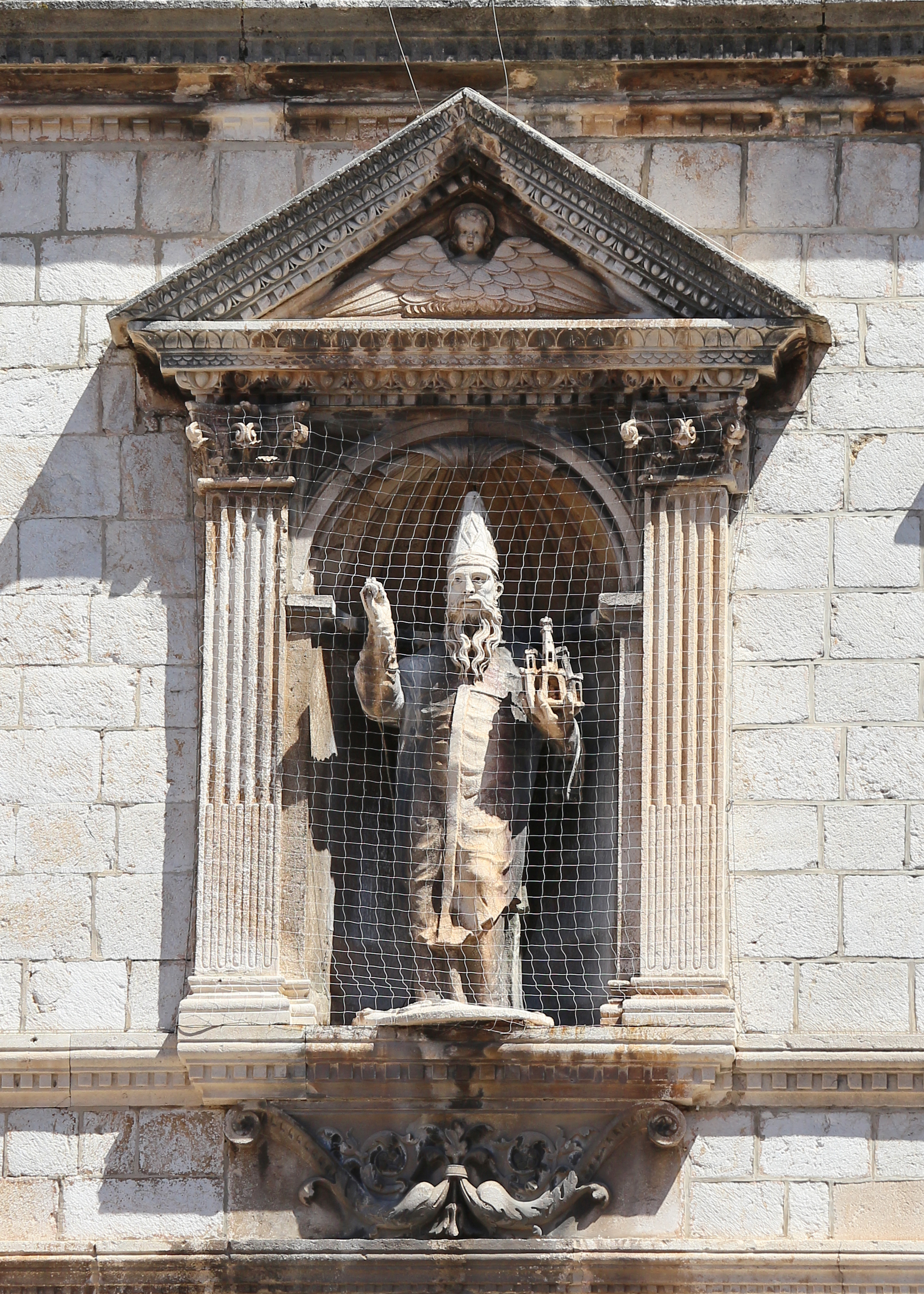
Statue of St. Blaise on facade

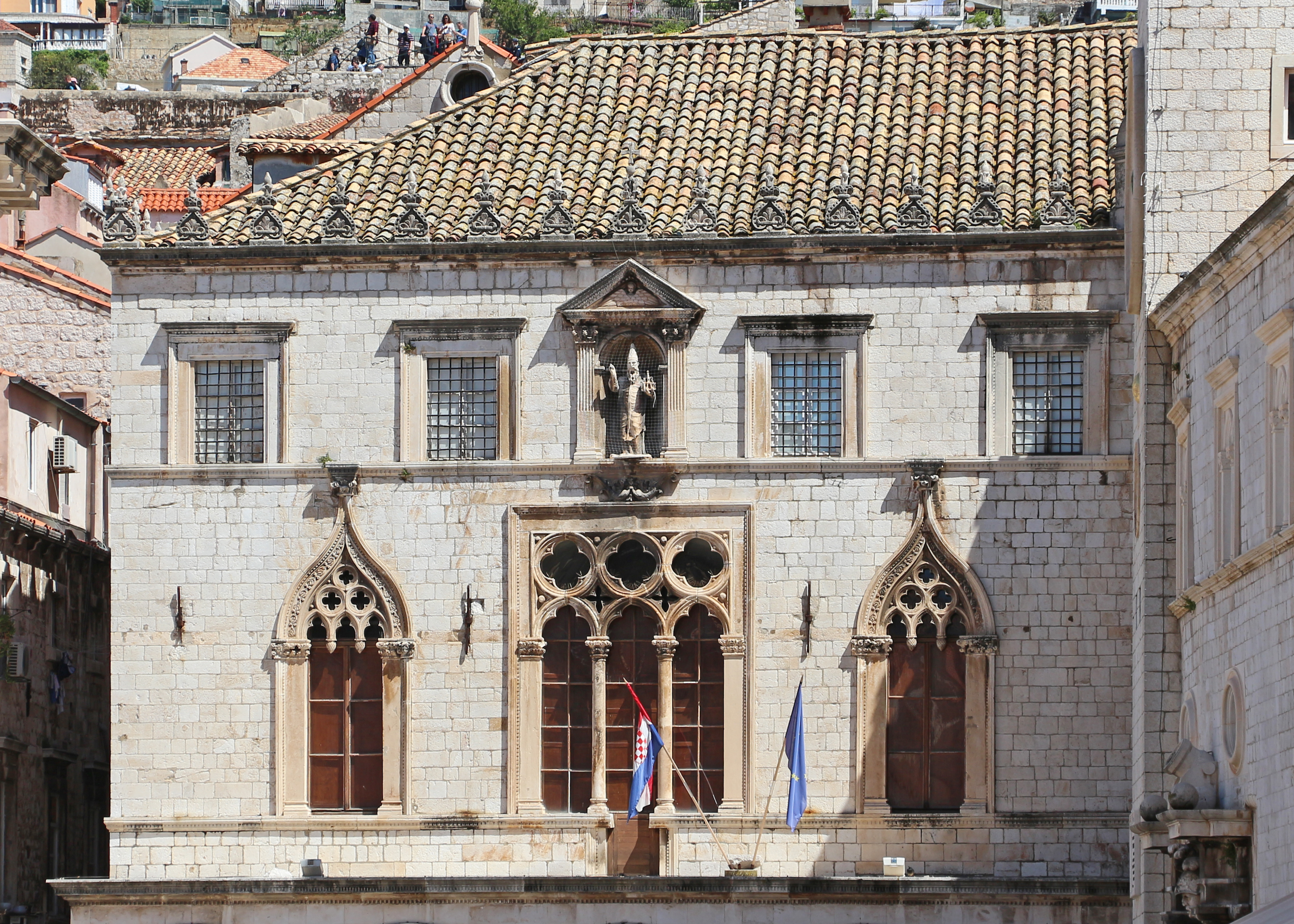
Facade details

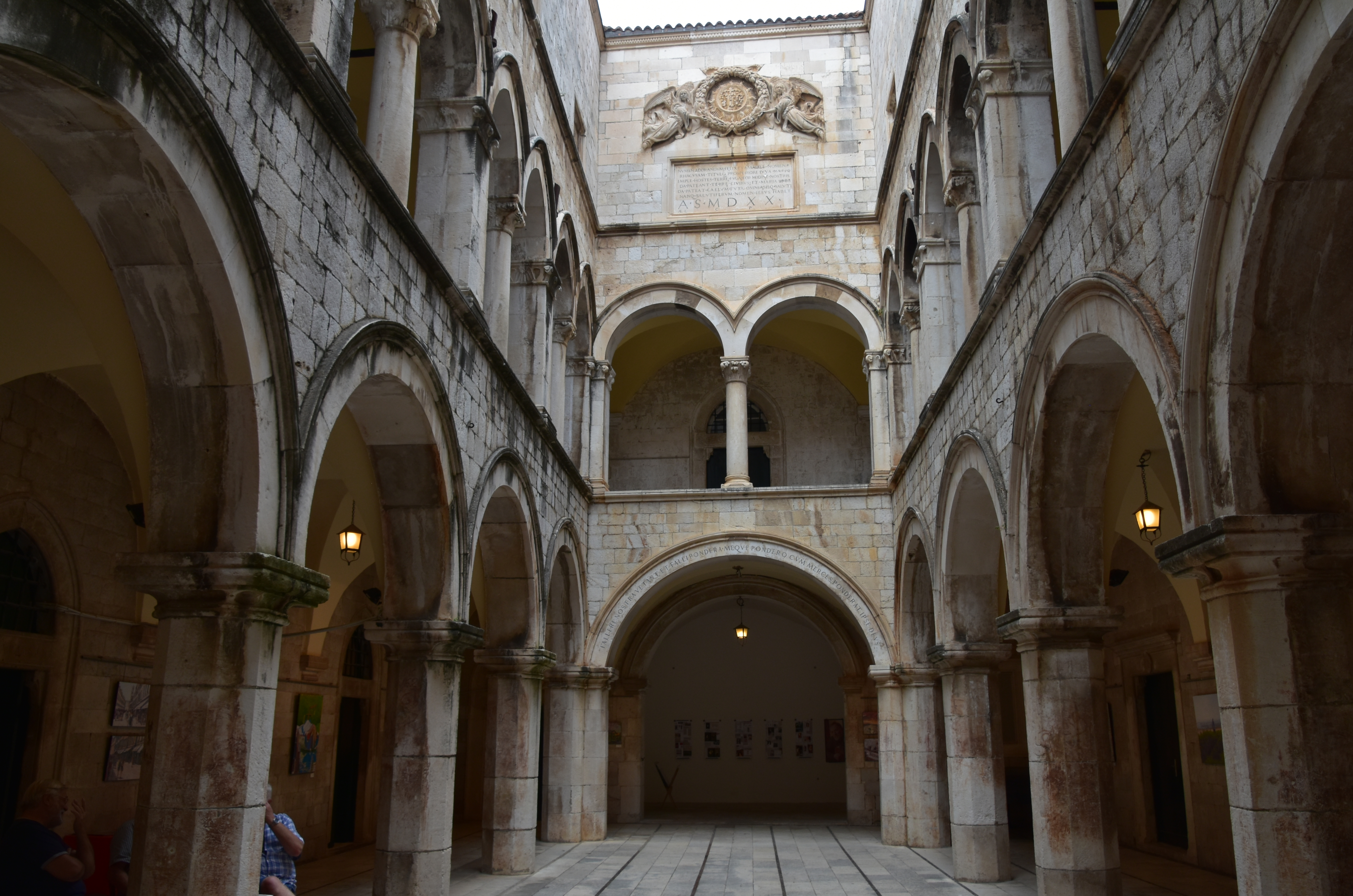
Atrium
