= Dubrovnik Archive =

State Archive of Dubrovnik, Croatia

Coordinates: 42.6412°N 18.1107°E

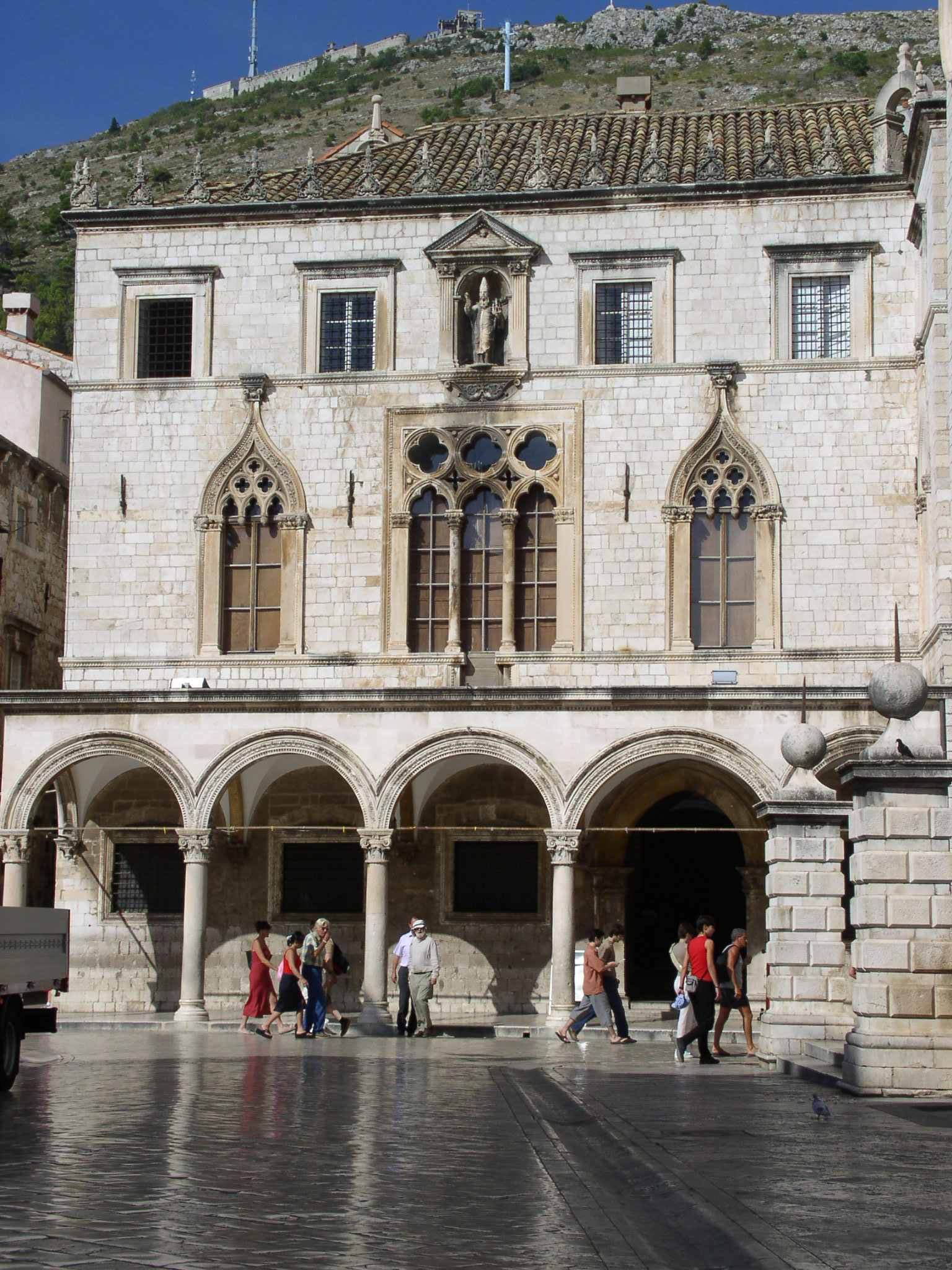
Sponza Palace, where the archives are located

Dubrovnik Archive or State Archive in Dubrovnik or Dubrovnik State Archive (Croatian: Dubrovački arhiv, Državni arhiv u Dubrovniku) is the national archive in Dubrovnik, Croatia. Today archive is located in the Sponza palace, and holds materials created by the civil service in the Republic of Ragusa, i.e. notary and secretarial services from the 13th century, and after the fall of the Republic in 1808 documents created by the offices and institutions in the city of Dubrovnik during the French, Habsburg, Yugoslav and Croatian reign.

The archive is important because the Republic of Ragusa had trade and political ties with all of the countries on the Mediterranean Sea and the interior of the southeastern part of the European continent; moreover, the documents and written records from that period represent very valuable historical material for the study of Croatian and Ragusan history, as well as the history of neighboring countries.

== History ==
Dubrovnik archive was created as a result of notary and secretarial services in the 13th century, with archived materials located in various locales, such as the offices of the civil services, magistrates and the offices outside the city walls. Since the mid-fifteenth century materials were stored in the ornate cabinets in Rector's Palace, which still serve the same purpose. Another part of the archived materials consisted of the most important privileges and contracts concluded between the Republic and the neighboring rulers, religious dignitaries and cities with which Dubrovnik held political and trade relations, and was stored in the treasury of the Cathedral of St. Mary. In addition to these two archive locations, the Republic of Ragusa had a few more, but they have all been destroyed, such as the archive in the Archbishop's Palace which was destroyed during a fire in 1667.

The bulk of the archived documents result from the operation of the offices of the city government, whose organization was completed during the 15th century. The existing state archives eventually formed into a separate institution, by various executive decisions of the highest bodies of the Republic of Ragusa. The term archive was first attested in 1599, and by 1760 archived documents from all locations was assembled in the Rector's Palace. Attestation of the term state archivist (publico archivista) dates since 1783. At that year the structure of the archive was recorded as divided into 14 series (861 volumes), while the unbound documents were arranged in 10 tables, by their initial letters from A through K. During the nineteenth and the twentieth century most of the archived material was taken away. In 1920 the Archive began operating as an independent institution, and in 1952 it relocated to the Sponza palace, where it is located to this day. During the Homeland War the archive building was heavily damaged in two attacks in 1991.

== Archive today ==
Today's collection comprises 300 thematic units (fondovi) and collections, with more than 2.7 million pages of written documents, deeds and contracts. The oldest documents are the Bull of Pope Benedict VIII from 1022, and documents on founding the Benedictine Monastery on the island of Lokrum in 1023 – both however preserved in much later copies. Major thematic units are those dating from the era of the Republic and French administration. The archive also contains records of offices and institutions who operated during the nineteenth and twentieth century within the city and its administrative area. In addition, the archive contains books from Dubrovnik and the island of Korčula up until 1860, the Collection of geographical maps as well as private family archives. Today, the Archive stores material from the Dubrovnik-Neretva County, functioning as an external archive service.

== See also ==
- List of archives in Croatia
- Ottoman archives
- Ottoman archive fund in Sarajevo
- State Archives of Venice
- Croatian State Archives
