= Classical Gymnasium in Zagreb =

- Klasična gimnazija u Zagrebu
- Gymnasium Classicum Zagrabiense
- Classical Gymnasium in Zagreb

Location
- 4a Križanićeva Street; Zagreb; Croatia
- 45.808534°N 15.988084°E

Information
- Type: Public
- Motto: Patria, Humanitas, Officium, Fides
- Established: 1607; 419 years ago
- Headmaster: Zdravka Martinić-Jerčić, prof.
- Secondary years taught: 9–12
- Age range: Aged 15 to 19
- Enrollment: Around 500
  - Grade 9: 156 (2024–25)
- Language: Croatian
- Song: Gaudeamus
- Nickname: "Klasična"
- Website: www.gimnazija-klasicna-zg.skole.hr

The Classical Gymnasium (Croatian: Klasična gimnazija) is a gymnasium high school (similar to a grammar school in England and Wales) situated in Zagreb, Croatia. Originally founded by the Society of Jesus in 1607, it now operates in the Križanićeva gymnasium complex in Donji grad.

== History ==
=== Formation ===
It was founded in 1607 by the Jesuits, who had recently settled in the Kingdom of Croatia (Habsburg) and Slavonia within the Habsburg monarchy. The gymnasium began operation on the initiative of the Zagreb City Council, with the approval of the Croatian Parliament (Sabor) and strong support of Ban of Croatia Ivan Drašković. Jesuit Ivan Žanić became its first rector, with 260 students enrolling in its first year. The gymnasium official opened on June 3, 1607, in a ceremony attended by Bishop of Zagreb Šimun Bratulić, ban Ivan Drašković and others. On the day of the opening ceremony, a Latin Language drama "Actio comica" was staged, in which the young actors celebrated the beauties of their homeland, with the tradition being kep continuously to this day. It operated on the basis of the Jesuit programme "Ratio atque institutio studiorum societatis Jesu".

The philosophy department was established in 1662, and opened on 3 November. The department was given university privileges by Emperor Leopold in Ebersdorf on 23 October 1669, which saw the founding of the University of Zagreb.

=== World War II ===
In August 1942, the Zagreb police of the Croatian fascist, ultranationalist Ustaše regime arrested 1,200 Jews and held them in the Classical Gymnasium which was them empty because of Summer holidays. Some of the Jews tried to commit suicide in the school. The Ustaše later took them to the Main Zagreb Railway Station, from where they were shipped to the Auschwitz concentration camp

=== Croatian War of Independence ===
The school's back yard was hit by an Orkan rocket on 2 May 1995 during the rocket attack on Zagreb in the Croatian War of Independence. The attack was noted in the trial judgement in the Martic case at the ICTY. The attack occurred during class-time which prevented many casualties which would have occurred had it been break-time, during which students roam the back yard on warm May days. The damage was soon repaired.

== Programme ==
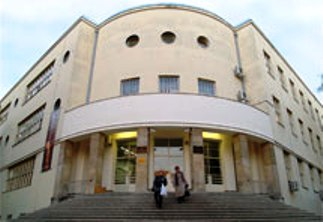
The school

The program, lasting four years, is based on combining classical education, with emphasis on humanities (namely languages including Latin and Ancient Greek, philosophy, literature, history, fine arts, music and theatre), with sciences and extracurricular activities.

Pupils study five languages: Latin, Ancient Greek, Croatian, English and one additional foreign language. They also study Croatian and World Literature, Mathematics, Physics, Chemistry, Biology, Geography, IT, History, Fine Arts, Music, Philosophy, Logic, Politics and Economy, Sociology, Psychology and attend exercise classes. Most of these subjects are taught for 4 years. Pupils are free to choose additional subjects on top of the compulsory ones, such as Religious studies, Ethics, and additional foreign languages.

The school has additional classes on alternate Saturdays. Pupils take on extra-curricular activities including ancient drama, choir singing, pottery, educational travel, and public speaking. The school's drama group stage one classic ancient play each year which usually premières in a Zagreb theatre.

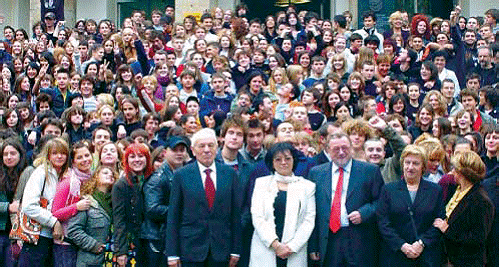
Anniversary opening celebration

Although originally following a Christian educational model, today's school is a completely secular institution comparable to English grammar schools. During the communist Yugoslav regime, in 1977 the name "gymnasium" was banned and the school became the Educational Language Center, but it preserved its spirit and the classical programme (including tuition of Latin and Ancient Greek languages).

=== 400th anniversary ===
During the 2006/2007 school year, the school celebrated its 400th anniversary with educational, historical, and entertaining festivities which include symposia and speeches, charity rock concerts, three Greek plays and open days.

== Alumni ==
After the school year 2023/24, 130 graduates of this gymnasium enrolled at an institution of higher learning in Croatia, or 92.86% of students who took up the nationwide Matura exams. The most common destinations for these students were the University of Zagreb faculties of economics, humanities and social sciences, law, political sciences, and mechanical engineering and naval architecture.

== Notable students ==
=== 17th century ===
- Fran Krsto Frankopan
- Juraj Habdelić
- Pavao Ritter Vitezović
- Ivan III Drašković
- Petar Petretić
- Ivan Zakmardi

=== 18th century ===
- Ivan Franjo Čikulin
- Baltazar Adam Krčelić
- Mihalj Šilobod Bolšić
- Tituš Brezovački

=== 19th century ===
- Dimitrija Demeter
- August Šenoa
- Janko Drašković
- Ante Starčević
- Vatroslav Jagić
- Vatroslav Lisinski
- Ivo Vojnović
- Mileva Marić

=== 20th century ===
- Stjepan Radić
- Miroslav Krleža
- Antun Gustav Matoš
- Josip Stadler

== Notable professors ==
- Juraj Habdelić
- Maksimilijan Vrhovac
- Matija Petar Katančić
- Milan Ogrizović

== Sources ==
- Povijest (in Croatian)
