= Ivan Franjo Čikulin =

Croatian nobleman and poet

Ivan Franjo Čikulin (3 June 1681 – 17 June 1746) was a Croatian nobleman and poet writing both in Latin and Croatian.

== Biography ==
He was born on 3 June 1681 in Oroslavje as the son of baron Stjepan Čikulin. He was schooled in Zagreb, Trnava and Graz, where he received his doctorate in philosophy. He subsequently went to Bologna to study law. In 1706 he was awarded the title of count by the emperor Joseph I.

In 1706 he was sent to act as a diplomat to the court in Vienna, subsequently becoming the captain of Tounje and working his way up to the position of the royal chaplain and advisor. In 1726, he was among the first members of the newly established Tabula Banalis in Zagreb. He served as captain of Kostajnica between 1730 and 1738. Čikulin also participated in the War of Succession in Saxony. He died in Konjščina on 17 June 1746.

== Literary career ==
During his studies in Zagreb, he was active as a poet, and also practiced drawing and copper engraving. A Zagreb canon, Grgur Paravigić (who was his prefect during Ivans' studies at the Classical Gymnasium) called him a great poet and humanist in 1706, having many of his work printed. His only surviving work, a collection of Latin poems Ideae magnanimitatis Illyricae et Pannonicae was published by the notable Pavao Ritter Vitezović, who also had his own verses printed at the beginning of the book as a dedication to Čikulin. His opus includes 24 historical works, 2 lamentations and 4 poetical dedications in which he lauded the heroics of Croatian and Hungarian individuals who fought against the Ottomans, namely Tamás Erdődy, Petar Zrinski, Miles anonymus Croata and others. In doing so, he used various historiographical works by Juraj Ratkaj, Miklós Istvánffy. Vitezovićs' thematic and conceptual influence is visible in these verses, and can be observed in other works by Čikulin, such as the Kajkavian song about the deaths of Christian warriors under Bihać in 1697, likewise printed in 1703 by Vitezović.

== Works ==
- Žalost i javkanje turskih, a radost i veselje keršćanskih duš, koje se leto 1697. na Ivanje pod Bihaćem s teli razlučiše (Zagreb, 1703)
- Pictures of bravery of Illyria and Panonia (Ideae magnanimitatis Illyricae et Pannonicae, Zagreb, 1705)
- Chosen heroes of Savian Panonia (Delecti Pannoniae Saviae Heroes, Bon, 1723.)
