= Ivan Zakmardi =

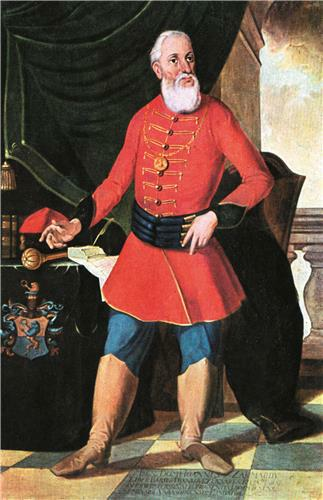
Ivan Zakmardi

Ivan Zakmardi (c. 1600 – 20 April 1667) was a Croatian humanist, lawyer and poet, who served as the prothonotary of the Habsburg Kingdom of Croatia-Slavonia in 1644, and was the representative of both the King and Ban of Croatia in legal matters. He is notable for setting the foundations for the Croatian State Archives in 1643.

== Biography ==
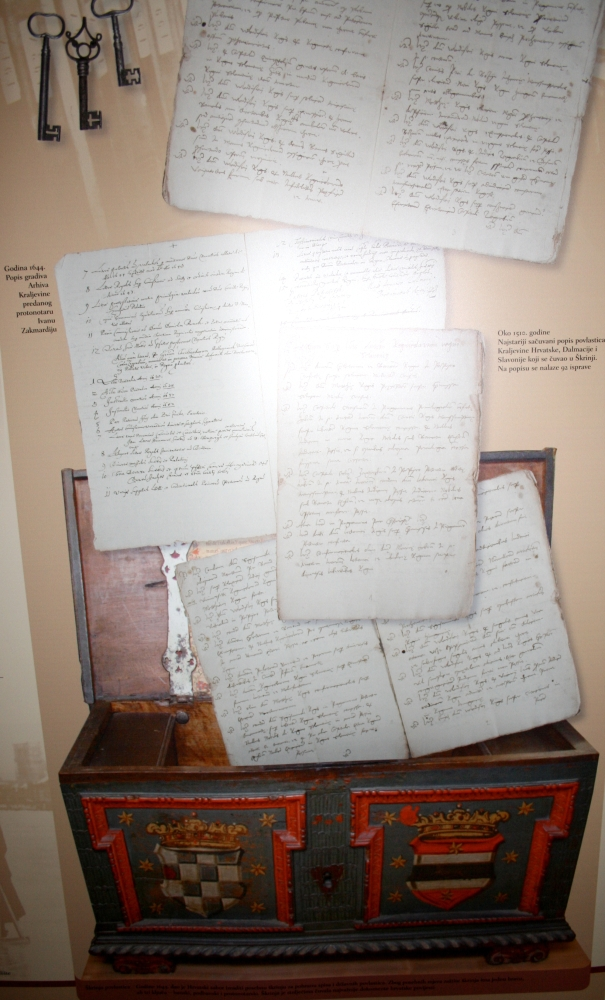
Chest of Privilege, made on the orders of Zakmandi

He studied at the Jesuit Gymnasium in Zagreb, which was followed by studying philosophy in Olomouc, Bohemia. After returning to Croatia, he became a lawyer representing the Bishopric of Zagreb, and worked as a public servant in various roles, such as judge in Križevci County, notary of Varaždin County, county notary of the Kingdom, chief treasurer and taxer of the Kingdom. He brought the Paulines to Križevci, who established a monastery, and secondary and primary schools. In 1641, the Croatian Sabor chose him as a member of a commission for making an inventory of and analyzing all the privileges of Croatia. He collected all the charters, laws and privileges and gave them to the Kaptol for safe keeping in the so-called "chest of privileges" (Cista privilegiorum Regni). In 1644, the same body chose him as the protonotary of the Croatian Kingdom. From 1662 until his death, he served as the vice-count (podžupan) of Varaždin County. He was a well known benefactor, who frequently endowed poor students, and left a considerable sum to the Jesuit and Pauline collegiums in Varaždin, Lepoglava and Križevci. In the wars against the Ottomans, he helped supplying food and arms to the local soldiers. He died in Banská Bystrica, in today's Slovakia, and was buried in the Zagreb Cathedral.

== Works ==
His surviving works are all written in Latin.

- Apologia comitis Nicolai Erdődy (Apologia of count Nicholas Erdődy)
- Illa ego Sclavonia, ac iam dicta Croatia tellus (I am that Slavonia, and the aforementioned Croatian land), a poem
