= State Archives in Slavonski Brod =

- Državni arhiv u Slavonskom Brodu (Croatian)
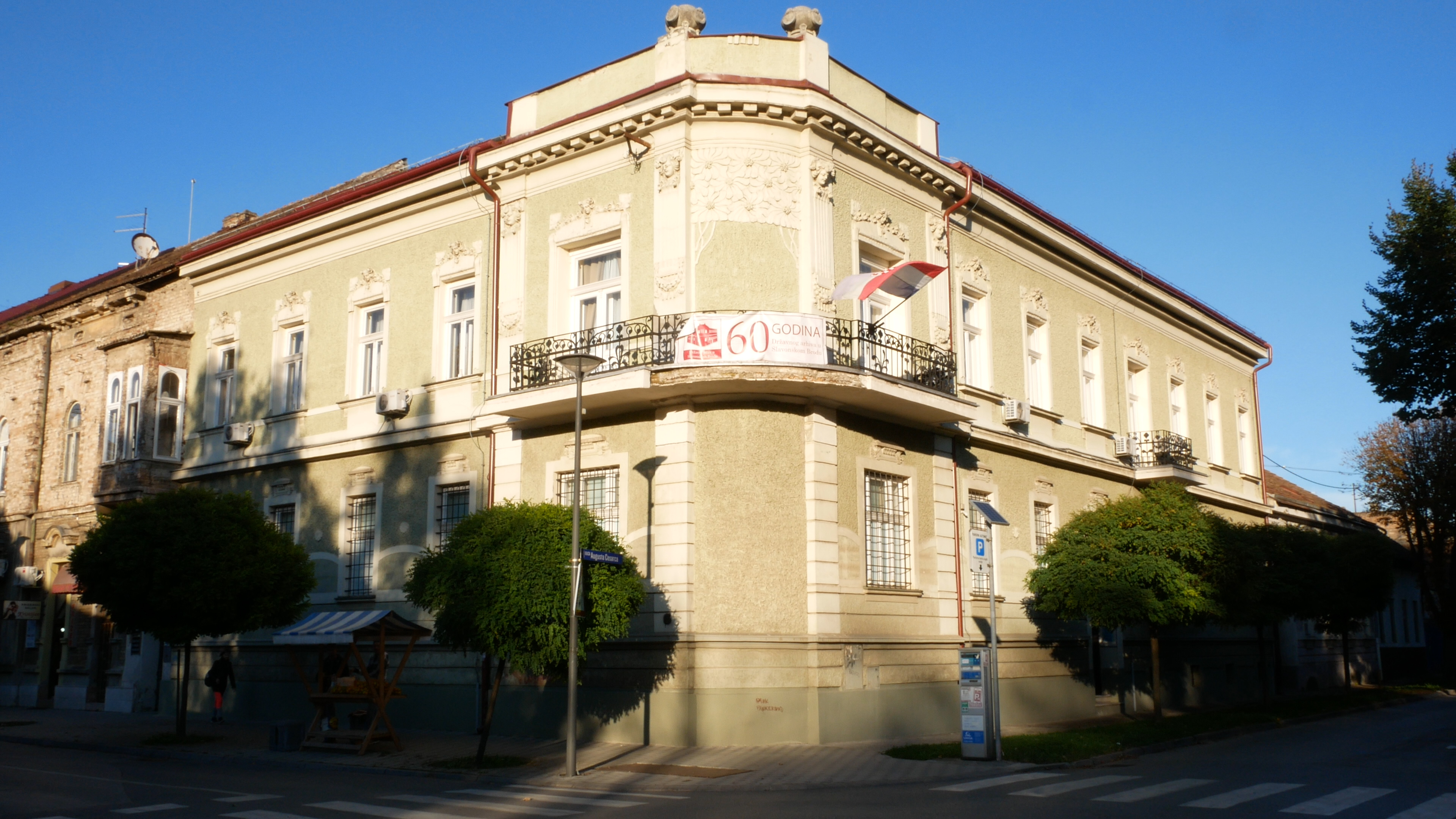
- Archive's headquarters in Slavonski Brod

Agency overview
- Formed: 1959; 67 years ago
- Jurisdiction: Government of Croatia
- Headquarters: A.Cesarca 1, 35 000 Slavonski Brod, Croatia
- Parent agency: Croatian State Archives
- Website: Official website

Map
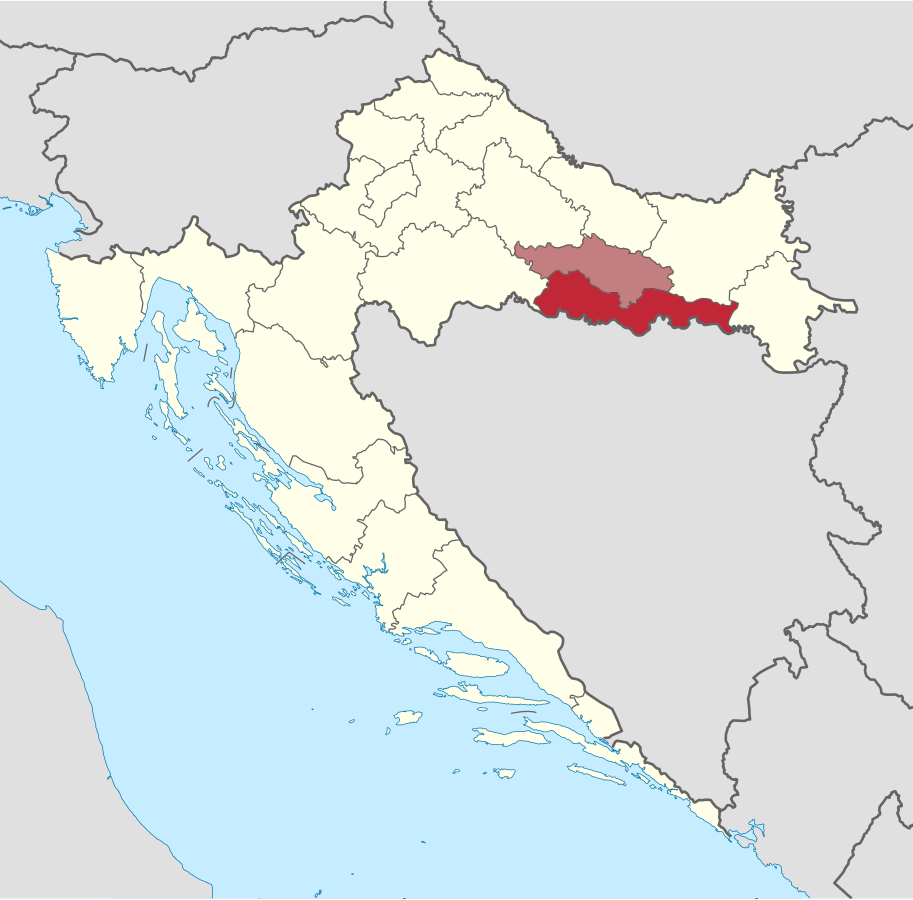
- Area of Brod-Posavina County and Požega-Slavonia County served by the archive shown on the map of Croatia

The State Archives in Slavonski Brod (Croatian: Državni arhiv u Slavonskom Brodu) is the primary public institution responsible for preservation of archival materials in the Brod-Posavina County and Požega-Slavonia County located in Slavonski Brod in eastern Croatia.

== History ==
Due to the accumulation of documents at the city museum and the need for systematic collection and proper storage, an initiative to establish an archive in Slavonski Brod was launched in 1957. This was part of a broader plan to create a new network of archives in the People's Republic of Croatia. The Croatian Archival Council supported the initiative, leading to the establishment of the Historical Archive of Slavonski Brod on March 16, 1959, by the decision of the People's Committee of the Slavonski Brod district. After the independence of Croatia, the Ministry of Culture took over the role of founder of the archives on May 27, 1994. Following directives from the Ministry of Culture on January 21, 1993, the archive was renamed from the Historijski arhiv u Slavonskom Brodu to the Povijesni Arhiv u Slavonskom Brodu. The term "Historijski" was replaced with "Povijesni," both of which translate to "historical" in English. While "Povijesni" is derived from exclusively Croatian lexicons, "Historijski" is a shared version throughout Serbo-Croatian language area. This change signified a broader trend of shift towards emphasizing national linguistic identity at the time. The archive was renamed once again in 1997 to its current name. In 2024 the archive organized a ceremony to mark 65 years of its work.

== See also ==
- List of archives in Croatia
