= Paskoje Miličević Mihov =

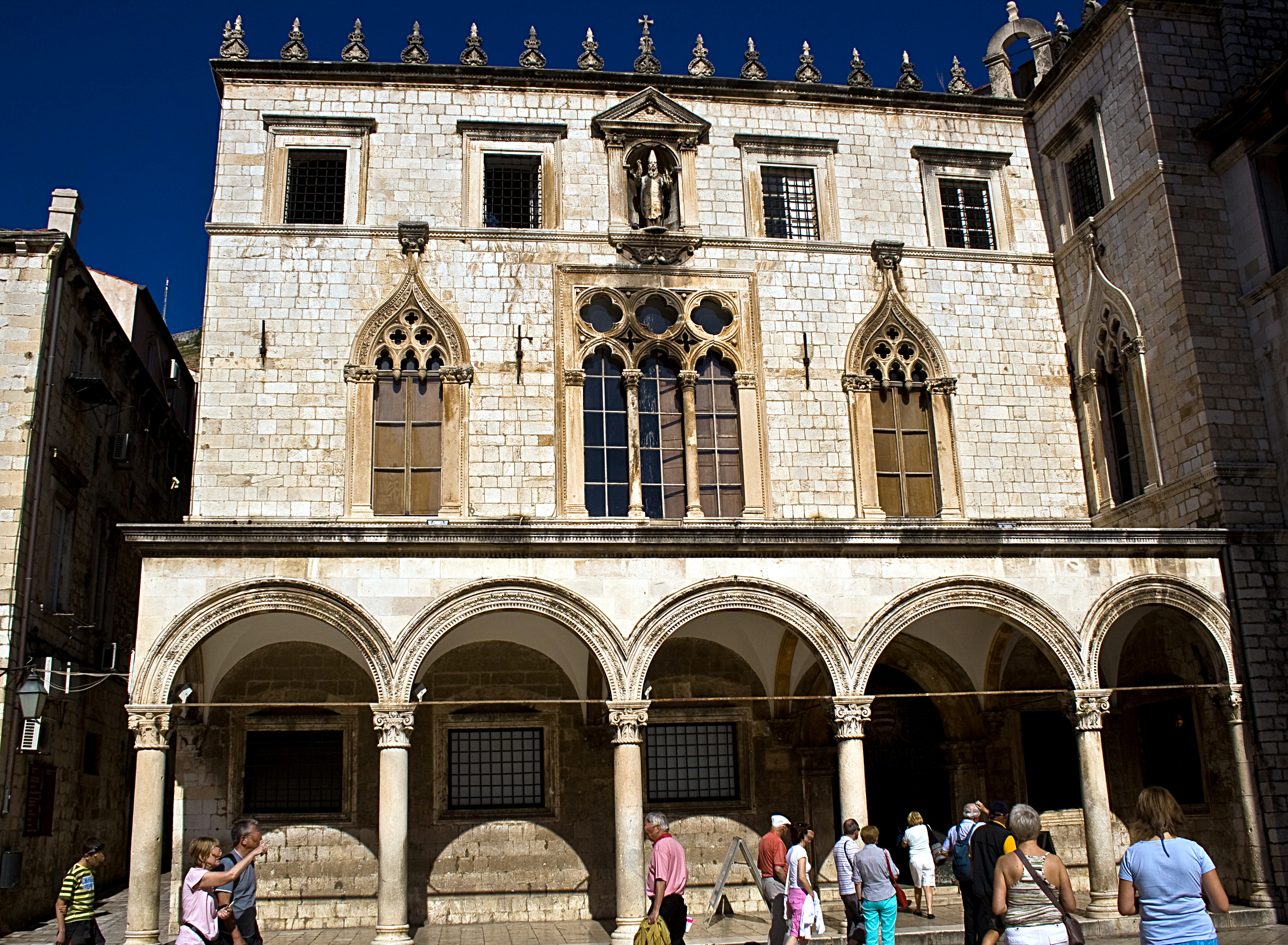
The Sponza Palace in Dubrovnik, the work of Paskoje Miličević

Paskoje Miličević Mihov (around 1440 – 1516) was a Ragusan (Republic of Ragusa) local builder. With the Andrijić brothers, he was active in drawing plans for the urban development of the Republic of Ragusa (today Dubrovnik) in the midst of the turbulent 15th- and 16th-century. While Michelozzo and Juraj Dalmatinac worked on the fortifications of the Walls of Dubrovnik and Walls of Ston and sea walls in the Dubrovnik harbours, Miličević was designing plans for the Dubrovnik Dominican Monastery and a mint in Dubrovnik.

At the Gate of Pile in Dubrovnik, on the western side of the land walls, there is a stone bridge between two Gothic arches, which were designed by the architect Paskoje Miličević in 1471. He also designed the two bridges to the Revelin Fortress in the 15th century, which explains the similarities between the bridges.

== See also ==
- List of Croatian architects
- Walls of Dubrovnik
