= State Archives in Vukovar =

- Državni arhiv u Vukovaru (Croatian)

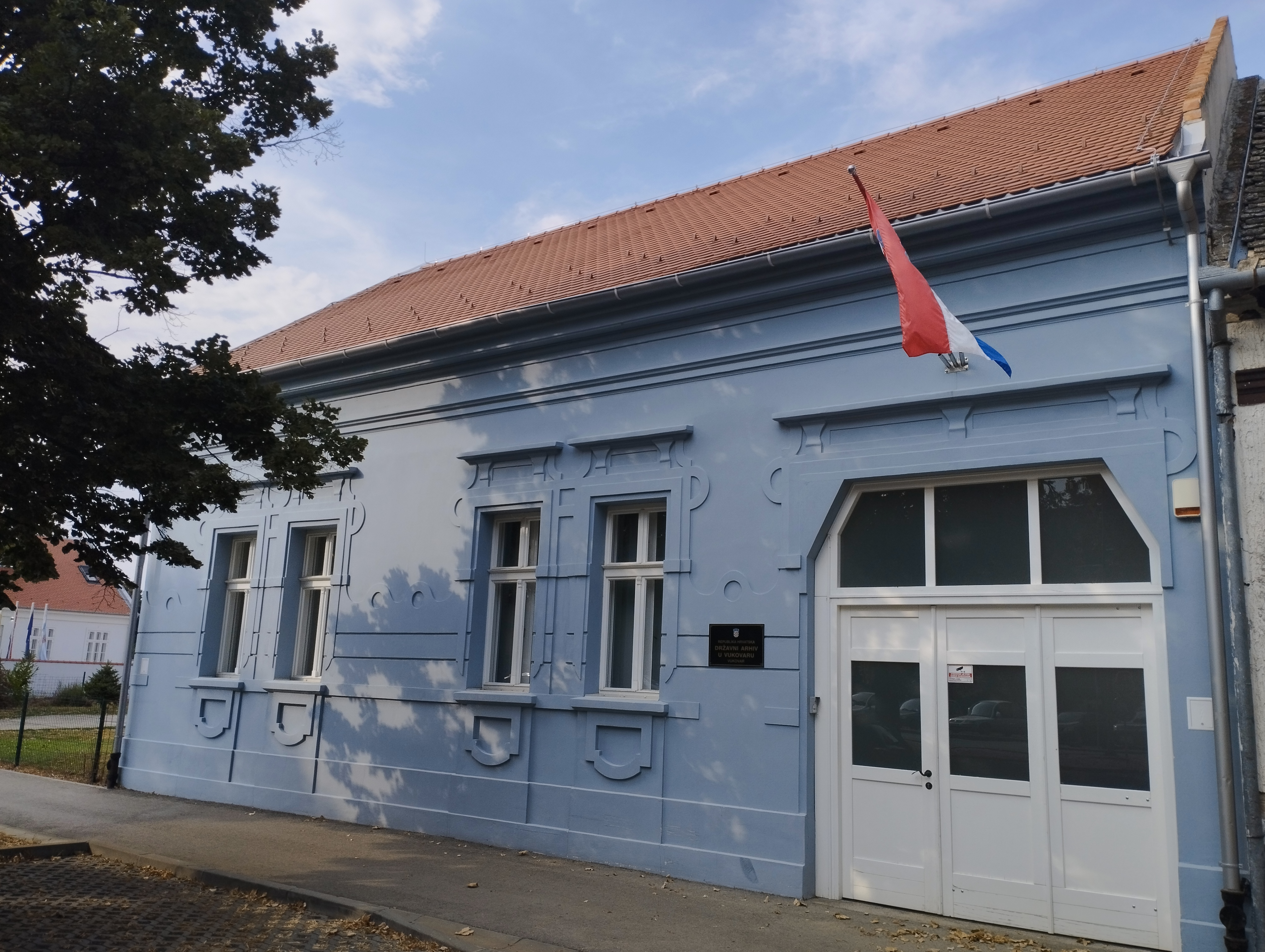
- Main administrative building in Vukovar

Agency overview
- Formed: 2007; 19 years ago
- Jurisdiction: Government of Croatia
- Headquarters: Županijska 66, 32 000 Vukovar, Croatia; 45°21′32″N 18°59′39″E
- Parent agency: Croatian State Archives
- Website: Official website

Map
- Area of Vukovar-Srijem County served by the archive shown on the map of Croatia

The State Archives in Vukovar (Croatian: Državni arhiv u Vukovaru, Serbian Cyrillic: Државни архив у Вуковару) is the primary public institution responsible for preservation of archival materials in the Vukovar-Srijem County located in Vukovar in eastern Croatia. The State Archives houses approximately 243 collections, totaling over 1,500 linear meters of archival material.

== History ==
The archive was established by the decision of the Government of Croatia in 2007 and it started its operations in 2008. The archive is organizationally divided between two locations, with formal seat and administration in Vukovar and archival materials with experts in Vinkovci. With Vinkovci being the largest and centrally located urban settlement in the county many other public institutions in the area are divided between the two cities. Prior to the opening of the archive the whole region was served by the State Archives in Osijek.

== See also ==
- List of archives in Croatia
- Historical Archive of Srem (in Vojvodina section of Syrmia)
