= Staro Čiče =

- Village
- Location within Croatia
- Coordinates: 45°41′35″N 16°7′5″E
- Country: Croatia
- Region: Central Croatia
- County: Zagreb County
- Municipality: Velika Gorica

Area
  - Total: 3.4 km^{2} (1.3 sq mi)

Population (2021)
  - Total: 720
  - Density: 210/km^{2} (550/sq mi)
- Time zone: UTC+1 (CET)
  - Summer (DST): UTC+2 (CEST)

Staro Čiče is a village in Croatia.
