= Matija Petar Katančić =

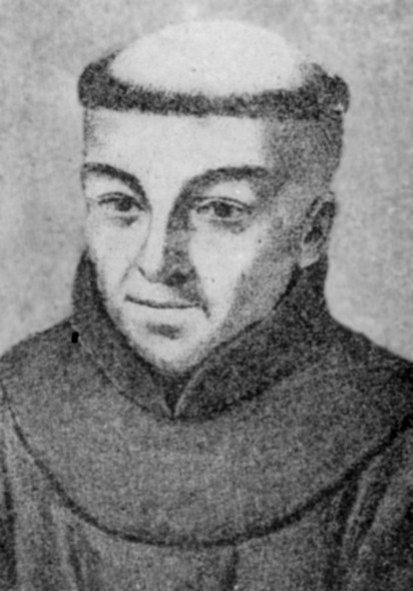
- Born: 12 August 1750; Valpovo, Kingdom of Croatia-Slavonia, Habsburg Monarchy
- Died: 26 May 1825 (aged 74); Buda, Kingdom of Hungary, Austrian Empire
- Occupations: Poet, scholar, archaeologist
- Writing career
- Notable works: Fructus auctumnales; De poesi illyrica
- Movements: Classicism, Enlightenment

Matija Petar Katančić (Latin: Mathias Petrus Katancsich; 1750–1825) was a Croatian writer and scholar. His fields include poetry, literary theory, philology, lexicography, aesthetics, archaeology, and numismatics. He is considered the father of Croatian archaeology in modern Croatia.

== Biography ==
Matija Petar Katančić was born on 12 August 1750 in Valpovo. As a bootmaker's son, he received his initial education in his native town, to continue his further education in Pecs, Buda, Baja and Szegedin. He had begun his noviciate in Vienna and entered the Franciscan order, taking the name Petar. He completed his theological studies in Osijek, and his philosophical studies, aesthetics and poetics, in Budim.

He worked for 10 years as a professor in Osijek, and when the Germanization wave strongly hit the Osijek grammar school (in 1788), he left for Zagreb where he became a professor at the Classical Gymnasium (1788–95) and also started keeping company with the Bishop of Zagreb, Maksimilijan Vrhovac. During this time, he published a number of philological works on Croats but also published his collection of poetry in Latin and Croatian titled Fructus auctumnales (1791), which also contains a polemic in prosody titled Brevis in prosodiam Illyricae linguae animadversio.

He was later elected professor of archaeology and numismatics in Budim (1795), but on account of bad health he had to stop teaching in 1800, in order to dedicate himself to science and also to the translation of the Bible into Croatian. In 1817 he wrote the "Booklet on Illyrian poetry" - De poesi Illyrica libellus, in which he tried to justify and explain his poetic starting position. He also published a number of very important books from the area of ancient archaeology in Panonia (Slavonia).

His work that is of utmost importance for the Croatian literature and culture is his translation of the complete Bible in six big volumes, the Old and the New Testament, published after his death, in Budim in 1831. He is also the author of two unfinished dictionaries, the huge semantic-etymological law dictionary, and the Latin-Croatian Etymologicon illyricum. Though some of his huge opus remained unfinished and incomplete, Katančić's conception of the indigenousness of Croats (Illyrians) and his texts written in the fully formed Štokavian-ikavian dialect of Croatian made a strong impact on the Croatian national revival.

He died in Buda, Kingdom of Hungary on May 26, 1825.

== Published works ==
=== Scientific works ===
- In veterem Croatorum patriam indagatio philologica (Philological research into the ancient homeland of the Croats), 1790, Zagreb
- Specimen philologiae et geographiae Pannoniorum (Specimen of the philology and geography of the Pannonians), 1795, Zagreb
- Elementa numismaticae (Basics of numismatics), 1799, Buda

=== Poetry ===
- Poskočnica Pana i Talije na Crnom brdu, 1788 (lost)
- Fructus auctumnales (Autumn fruits), 1791, Zagreb (poems in Latin and Croatian)
- De poesi illyrica libellus ad leges aestheticae exactus (A small book on Illyrian poetry, drawn up according to the laws of aesthetics), 1817, Buda
