= State Archives in Osijek =

Public institution in Osijek, Croatia

- Državni arhiv u Osijeku (Croatian)

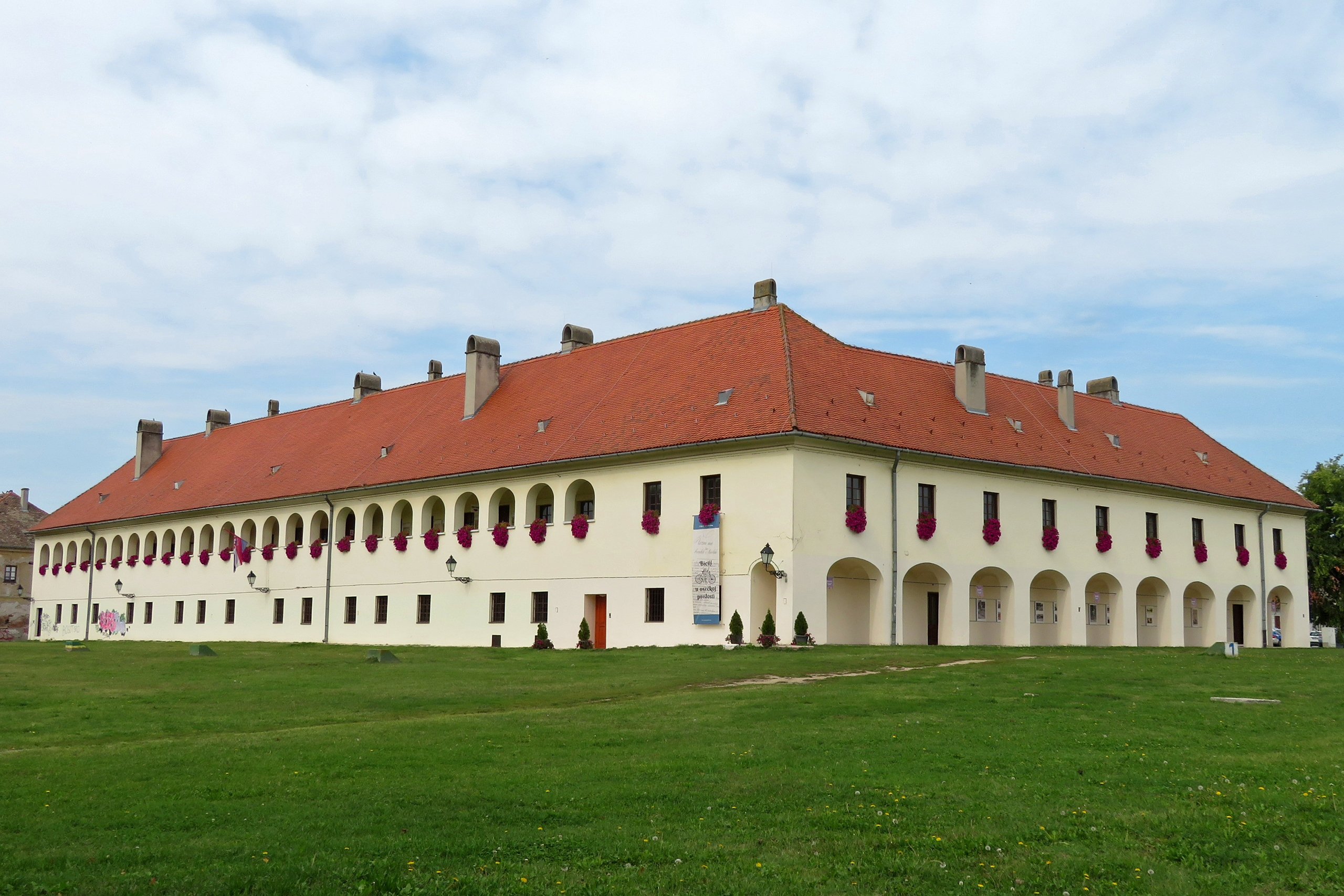
- Building in Tvrđa housing the archive

Agency overview
- Formed: 1947; 79 years ago
- Jurisdiction: Government of Croatia
- Headquarters: Kamila Firingera 1, 31 000 Osijek, Croatia; 45.5594°N 18.6978°E
- Parent agency: Croatian State Archives
- Website: Official website

Map
- Area of Osijek-Baranja County served by the archive shown on the map of Croatia

The State Archives in Osijek (Croatian: Državni arhiv u Osijeku) is the primary public institution responsible for preservation of archival materials in the Osijek-Baranja County located in Osijek in eastern Croatia. The State Archives in Osijek houses approximately 1,500 collections and archives, totaling over 8,000 linear meters of material and more than 50,000 photographs.

== History ==
The archive was established after the end of World War II in Yugoslavia in 1947 by the decision of People's Republic of Croatia authorities. In December of 1991, during the Croatian War of Independence, the archive together with other institutions in Croatia was in danger of devastation motivating calls from international scholars for protection.

== See also ==
- List of archives in Croatia
