= Croatian Film Archive =

National film archive of Croatia

The Croatian Film Archive (Croatian: Hrvatska kinoteka) is the national film archive of Croatia. It is a member of the International Federation of Film Archives and of ACE, the Association of European Film Archives and Cinematheques. The archive was founded in 1979.

== See also ==
- List of film archives
- Cinema of Croatia
