= Grading systems by country =

This is a list of grading systems used by countries of the world, primarily within the fields of secondary education and university education, organized by continent with links to specifics in numerous entries.

== Africa ==
=== Angola ===
The grading system depends on the districts in Angola. However, this is the most common used grading system:

Title	US Equivalent	Percentage	
Tier I	A A- A+	90–100	Passing
Tier II	B B- B+	80–89	Passing
Tier III	C C- C+	70–79	Passing
Tier IV	D D- D+	60–69	Passing
Tier V	E E- E+	50–59	Failing
Tier VI	F F- F+	0–49	Failing

All schools in Angola have 6 tiers and are given based on student's performance.

=== Kenya ===
The grading system employed throughout Kenya differs based on the level of institution. The secondary school grading system ranges from grade A to E with grade thresholds changing each year depending on the intensity of the exam. Institutes and colleges award the results of examinations depending on the KNEC grading system in 4 classes (Distinction, Credit, Pass, Fail) with 7 grades of 1 to 7. The university grading system awards degrees in terms of class (First Class, Second Class – Upper Division, Second Class – Lower Division and Pass Class).

A breakdown of the undergraduate degree grading system for Kenyan universities is:

Percent	Grade	Class
90–100	A	First Class
80–89	B	Second Class – Upper Division
69–79	C	Second Class – Lower Division
58–78	D	Pass
Below 58	E	Fail

The grading system for Kenyan colleges is:

Percent	Grade	Class
80–100	1	Distinction
75–79	2	Distinction
70–74	3	Credit
60–69	4	Credit
50–59	5	Pass
40–49	6	Pass
0–39	7	Fail

The general base grading system used for the grading system in Kenyan secondary schools is:

Percent	Grade	Points
81–100%	A	12
74–80%	A−	11
68–73%	B+	10
63–67%	B	9
53–62%	B−	8
55–59%	C+	7
50–54%	C	6
45–49%	C−	5
40–44%	D+	4
35–39%	D	3
30–34%	D−	2
0–29%	E	1

=== Nigeria ===
The choice of grading system at Nigerian schools depends on the institution and sometimes on the faculty of the institution. In addition, grading scales at university-level institutions have changed frequently. Grading scales can be 1 to 8, 1 to 4, or A through G, where A is on a 4.0 scale or on a 5.0 scale. The most common scale is now 1 to 7, with 9 being the highest grade obtained. In addition, degrees are awarded in a Class, depending on the grades received. Degrees may be awarded in the First Class, Second Class (Upper Division), Second Class (Lower Division), Third Class, and Pass Class. Grading scales for secondary certificates are standard. Below is the grading system of Nigerian universities:

Percentage	Grade	Description
75–100	A	First class
70–74.9	B	Second class, Upper Division
50–69.9	C	Second Class, Lower Division
45–49	D	Third Class
40–44	E	Pass Class
30–39	F	Fail

=== South Africa ===
In South Africa, some universities follow a model based on the British system. The University of the Witwatersrand considers an A to be 75% and above. It is important to pass your matriculation test known as the NBT's to get to a college/university.

Percentage	Description
75%+	First class
70–74%	Second class (division 1)
60–69%	Second class (division 2)
50–59%	Third class
40–49%	Pass
<40%	Fail

=== Tanzania ===
The provided grades are used within the A-level secondary education system of Tanzania; students may be enrolled within a university or college upon receiving grades from level A to D within 2 of 3 core subjects, with an S grade as a minimum qualification. Three core subjects are generally taken, with additional classes available; grading in universities, however, is an independent process, with grades varying between universities.

Percentage	Grade	Description
80–100	A	Significantly above average
70–79	B	Above average
60–69	C	Average
50–59	D	Pass
40–49	E	Below average
35–39	S	Significantly below average
0–34	F	Fail

== Asia ==
Different countries in Asia have a variety of grading scales. Grading scales for some countries in Asia are described.

=== Afghanistan ===
In Afghanistan, the highest score awarded at schools is 100, the minimum passing score is 40, the highest score in universities is 100 and the minimum passing score is 55 (before 2016 it was 50). The threshold for a good mark depends on the school and the study grade, but on most occasions, 75 or higher is considered a good one.

==== School Grading System ====
Grade	Scale	Description
90–100	A	Excellent
80–89	B	Good
70–79	C	Fair
60–69	D	Bad
0–59	F	Fail

==== Universities Grading System ====
Grade	Scale	4 Point Scale	Description
90	A	4	Excellent
80	B	3	Good
70	C	2	Fair
60	D	1	Bad
50	F	0	Fail

=== Bangladesh ===
This article is a summary of academic grading in Bangladesh. Two types of grading systems are available in this country, grade point average (GPA) and cumulative grade point average (CGPA).The CGPA is typically evaluated by mathematically averaging the GPAs across all completed semesters or credit hours to provide a comprehensive measure of a student's academic performance.

==== High School Grading System ====
Class interval	Letter grade	Grade point	Reference
80–100	A+	5.00	
70–79	A	4.00	
60–69	A−	3.50	
50–59	B	3.00	
40–49	C	2.00	
33–39	D	1.00	
0–32	F	0.00	

==== University Grading System ====
Degree evaluation with ″class″ in university (e.g., First Class, Second Class, Third class, Pass)

The bachelor's and master's degrees result of the public universities in Bangladesh, e.g., University of Dhaka, Jahangirnagar University, Bangladesh Agricultural University, Rajshahi University, University of Chittagong, National University, Gazipur can be classified according to the British undergraduate degree classification system, when it is evaluated with class grade. GPA above or equal to 3 is equal to 1st Class in honors degree in Bangladesh. This means:

- CGPA 3.00 to 4.00 = 1st Class
- CGPA 2.25 to 2.99 = 2nd Class
- CGPA 2.00 to 2.24 = 3rd Class

Grading system in Public and most Private Universities
Class interval	Letter grade	Grade point	Remarks
80–100	A+	4.00	First Class
75–79	A	3.75	First Class
70–74	A−	3.50	First Class
65–69	B+	3.25	First Class
60–64	B	3.00	First Class
55–59	B−	2.75	Second Class
50–54	C+	2.50	Second Class
45–49	C	2.25	Second Class Upper
40–44	D	2.00	Third Class
0–39	F	0.00	Fail

=== China ===
This is the default grading system in China:

Comment	US Equivalent	(100 Points) Percentage	150 Points
Excellent	A	85–100	127.5–150
Good	B	75–84	112.5–127
Satisfactory	C	60–74	90–112
Fail	F	0–59	0–89

For 100 points, numeral score will not be rounded up. For example, 84.99% counts as "Good" not "Excellent" and will not be rounded to 85%. Only numbers equal to or bigger than 85% will count as "Excellent".

=== India ===
==== Grading in universities and secondary school ====
Indian universities follow a Percentage System and Indian Institutes of Technology, National Institutes of Technology, Indian Institutes of Information Technology, Indian Institutes of Engineering Science and Technology and various other centrally funded technical institutes of the country follow a 10-point GPA System.

The Percentage System is defined with:

- maximum grade of 100 marks,
- a minimum grade of 0 marks
- passing grade from 30 to 40 marks.

This depends on the university; lower percentages may be considered passing grades at several universities.

The percentage system is used in CBSE and other Secondary Education Boards.

Mark letters	Grade %
A	55–100
A	34–54
B	28–33
B	22–27
C	18–21
C	11–17
D	0–10
E (Failed)	9 and below

The 10-point GPA system utilized at the Indian Institutes of Technology, National Institutes of Technology, Indian Institutes of Information Technology, Indian Institutes of Engineering Science and Technology and various other centrally funded technical institutes of the country, however, functions as follows:

Grade	Letter Grade	Description
9–10	S	Excellent
8–9	A	Very Good
7–8	B	Good
6–7	C	Satisfactory Work
4–6	D	Sufficient
3–4	E	Insufficient
0	U	Unfair Behavior (e.g. cheating)

An additional university grading system currently utilized in India is the eight-point GPA introduced by University of Mumbai from the 2012–2013 academic year; the system is categorized as follows:

Marks	Letter Grade	Grade point
90–100	O	8
80–89.99	A+	7
60–79.99	A	6
55–59.99	B	5
50–54.99	C	4
45–49.99	D	3
40–44.99	E	2
≤39.99	F	1

Some universities follow a weighted average pattern to calculate the grade percentage:

Semester	Percentage of Aggregate Marks
1 and 2	40
3 and 4	60
5 and 6	80
7 and 8	100

The International Grade Conversion system, by World Education Services, for percentages scored in Indian universities allows one to locate the corresponding grade in the US or the corresponding grade point average for each grade provided at an Indian University; the conversion system functions as follows, with the equivalent classification or division provided, as well.

Percentage	Grade	U.S. Grade Equivalent	Classification/Division
60–100	3.5–4.0	A or (O)	First class, Distinctive, Outstanding
55–59	3.15–3.49	B+	Second Class
50–54	2.5–3.14	B	Second Class
43–49	2.15–2.49	C+	Third Division
35*–42	1.5–2.14	C	Failure, Third Division (dependent on university)
0–34	0–1.49	F	Failure

Conversions from divisions to US grades function as follows:

By Division	U.S. Grade Equivalent
I (First Division)	A
II (Second Division)	B/B+
III (Third Division)	C/C+

*At selected institutions, a lower grade may be considered passing.

==== Grading in high school ====
Most boards in India give the raw marks obtained by the students, though some may only give the grade attained by the student.

National boards like CBSE give the marks obtained by the student and (for CBSE) the positional grade which indicates a student's level in that subject with respect to their peers.

Some educational boards still follow the practice of giving 'divisions': a percentage over 90 is considered excellent; between 70 and 89 is considered to be 'first division'; between 50 and 69 is considered to be 'second division', between 40 and 49 is considered to be a pass; though these terminologies and classifications depend on the 'board of education'. According to NEP the grading system in India will undergo a few more changes based on the marks obtained by the candidates. students will get promoted based on their grades obtained in cbse. The marking criteria being average and below average performance in the test

Percentage	Grade
80–100%	A
70–79%	B
60–69%	C
50–59%	D
40–49%	E

=== Indonesia ===
Default Grading System/Standard Nasional Pendidikan

Range	Grade Letter	Description
100	A+	Excellent
81–99,99	A	Good/Average
78–80,99	A−	Almost Good
75–77,99	B+	Half Good
70–74,99	B	Lower Average
65–69,99	B-	Acceptable (Need to fix grade)
60–64,99	C+	Acceptable (Need to fix grade)
55–59,99	C	Acceptable (Need to fix grade)
40–54,99	D	Fail. Average school require students to take re-test. (Need to fix grade)
0–39,99	E	Fail. Average school require students to take re-test.

=== Iran ===
The Iranian grading system is similar to France's and other French-patterned grading systems such as Belgium, Lebanon, Venezuela, and Peru in secondary schools and universities. Since a grading guideline is not provided by the Iranian Ministry of Education, conversion to the international scales is carried out using conversion guideline provided for French-patterned grading systems. In specific cases, grades are converted according to the destination institutes' grading policy. The passing grade is 10 and usually a grade of more than 14 out of 20 is considered excellent. The following table is most commonly used by world institutes and universities to convert from the Iranian grading system:

Grade	U.S. Grade Equivalent	Honors terminology
18–20	A	Excellent
17–17.99	B+	Good
16–16.99	B	Good
14–15.99	C+	Fair
12–13.99	C	Fair
10–11.99	D	Bad
0–9.99	F	Fail

=== Israel ===
In Israel, schools have grades from 1–100, starting from the 4th grade on. In private schools, alphabetic grading system is usually used until secondary education. In universities both numerical and alphabetical grade systems can be found, according to each university system. The 100-point grading scale is as follows:

Percentage	Grade	Description
95–100	10	מצוין (excellent)
85–94	9	טוב מאוד (very good)
75–84	8	טוב (good)
65–74	7	כמעט טוב (almost good)
60–65	6	מספיק (adequate)
50–60	5	מספיק בקושי (barely adequate)
<48	<4	בלתי מספיק/נכשל (inadequate/fail)

The equivalent Letter Grades can be found below:

Letter Grade	Grade Points
A+	90–100
B+	85−89
B	80−84
C+	75−79
C	70−74
D+	65−69
D	60−64
P	50−59
F	0–49

=== Japan ===
In Japan, following the reorganization of national universities in 2004, the Ministry of Education, Sports and Culture has encouraged both public and private universities to adopt a GPA system.

Other higher education institutions give grades on a scale from 0–100 or a few universities apply letter grades. While for years an "A" grade range was from 80 to 100 points, some schools (for example, at Kurume University) have started to give the 90 to 100 point range a special grade to indicate excellence. A failing grade is generally called an "E", though some institutions use "F".

Scale	Letter Grade
90–100	A
80–89	B
70–79	C
60–69	D
0–59	Fail (E)

=== Kazakhstan ===
According to standardized credit system accepted in the Republic of Kazakhstan, the measurements of varying levels of comprehension in the realm of higher education in the Republic of Kazakhstan are the following:

Letters	Range	Percentage	Descriptors
A	4.0	95–100	Excellent
A−	3.67	90–94	Excellent
B+	3.33	85–89	Good
B	3.0	80–84	Good
B−	2.67	75–79	Good
C+	2.33	70–74	Satisfactory
C	2.0	65–69	Satisfactory
C−	1.67	60–64	Satisfactory
D+	1.33	55–59	Satisfactory
D	1.0	50–54	Satisfactory
F	0	0–49	Unsatisfactory

=== Kuwait ===
Kuwait employs a four-point grading system and percentages.

Grade	Scale	Description	US Grade Points
A	94–100	امتياز وتفوق (Excellent)	4.00
A−	90–93.99	امتياز وتفوق (Excellent)	3.70
B+	86–89.99	جيد جدا (Good)	3.30
B	82–85.99	جيد جدا (Good)	3.00
B−	80–81.99	جيد جدا (Good)	2.70
C+	76–79.99	جيد (Average)	2.30
C	72–75.99	جيد (Average)	2.00
C−	70–71.99	جيد (Average)	1.70
D+	66–69.99	مقبول (Bad)	1.30
D	62–65.99	مقبول (Bad)	1.00
D-	60–61.99	مقبول (Bad)	0.70
F	0–59.99	راسب (Failure)	0.00

=== Kyrgyzstan ===
Kyrgyzstan employs a five-point grading system:

Grade	Description	Notes
5	Эң жакшы (Excellent)	Highest possible grade
4	Жакшы (Good)	Passing grade
3	Канаатандырарлык (Satisfactory)	Lowest passing grade
2	Канаатандырарлык эмес (Unsatisfactory)	Not a passing grade
1	Эң канаатандырарлык эмес (Most Unsatisfactory)	Not a passing grade; uncommon

=== Lebanon ===
Lebanese schools follow either the French grading system or the American grading system. Most schools use a 0–20 scale where the passing grade is 10 out of 20 (minimum passing grade may be as low as 7). It depends on the programme the school is offering: French/Lebanese Baccalaureate use the 0–20 scale with some exceptions (some schools offer the Lebanese baccalaureate but instead of the 0–20 scale a 100-point scale is used). IB schools unanimously use a 100-point scale if not an American grading scale (refer to the American grading system).

In the typical school offering a Lebanese curriculum (to which the outcome is a Lebanese Baccalaureate) getting high grades is difficult because teachers do not use the full scale. For instance, the highest score one can earn in essay writing in some schools is 14 out of 20 (with the class averaging 9 or 10). Each subject has a weight and thus contributes differently towards the overall score: the "General Average" (taken from the French Moyenne Générale). This weight is determined by credit hours. For instance, math (6 hours/week) x 20 (the base grade) = 120 (weight).

Example: Sample grades: (Maths 13.33/20, English 13.4/20, Biology 8.25/20)

English: 5 credits × 13.4 = 67 out of possible 100

Math: 6 credits × 13.33 = 79.98 out of possible 120

Biology: 2 credits × 8.25 = 16.5 out of possible 40

Total points earned = 163.48 out of possible 260

General Average / Moyenne Générale 12.575 (Considered a good average, a B+ if not A− US equivalent since the standards are different: Grade 12 in Lebanese Baccalaureate or French Baccalaureate is equivalent to a US College Freshman, moreover all Lebanese programmes include 3 languages and a total of 18 subjects yearly with summer homework.) Students graduating Lebanese or French Baccalaureate enter universities as sophomores, not freshmen, and can complete their degrees in 3 years.

U.S. Equivalence Scale	U.S. Grade Equivalent
14–20	A+
13–13.9	A
11–12.9	B+
10–10.9	B
9.5–9.9	B–
9.1–9.4	C+
9	C
8–8.9	C−
6.5–7.9	D
<6	F

In some universities, the American grading system is used. Others use the 0–100 scale where the passing grade is 60 or 70 depending on the course. French system universities use the 0–20 grading scale.

=== Malaysia ===
Malaysia has its own educational grading system. Different institutions of education use a different grading scheme. This is an example of a grading system practiced in a university in Malaysia.

Percentage	Grade	Description	Quality Point
85+	A	Excellent	4.00
80+	A−	Excellent	3.7
75+	B+	Good	3.3
70+	B	Good	3.00
65+	B−	Good	2.7
60+	C+	Satisfactory	2.3
55+	C	Satisfactory	2.00
45+	D	Bad	1.67
40+	D−	Bad	1.33
35+	E	Poor	1.00
≤35	F	Fail	0.00

Until high school, the average percentage is provided. A percentage over 80 is considered excellent; between 60 and 80 is considered to be 'first division'; between 40 and 60 is considered to be 'second division'.

The Percentage System works as follows: the maximum number of marks possible is 100, the minimum is 0, and the minimum number of marks required to pass is 35. Scores of 91–100% are considered excellent, 75–90% considered very good, 55–64% considered good, 45–55% considered fair, 41–44% considered pass, and 0–40% considered fail. A percentage above 65% is referred to as the 1st Division and indicates a high intellectual level. Some universities follow a weighted average pattern to calculate percentage: 1st and 2nd Semester – 40% of the aggregate marks, 3rd and 4th Semester – 60% of the aggregate marks, 5th and 6th Semester – 80% of the aggregate marks, 7th and 8th Semester – 100% of the aggregate marks.

The 10-point GPA is categorized as follows:

GPA	Grade	Description
10–9.1	O or A+	Best
9–8.1	A	Excellent
8–7.1	B+	Exceptionally good
7–6.1	B	Very good
6–5.1	C+	Good
5–4.1	C	Average
4–3.1	D+	Fair
3.1–2	D	Pass
2–0	E+/E	Fail

A GPA of over 7 is generally considered to be an indication of a strong grasp of all subjects.

Percentage	Eq	Grade	Classification
90 to 100	4.5	O	Outstanding
60 to 89	4.0	A or (A+ for >90%)	Distinction/First class**
50 to 59	3.5	B+	Second class
40 to 49	3.0	B	Pass class
<39	2.0	C	Fail

=== Pakistan ===
In Pakistan, the grading scheme is as follows:

Percentage Marks	Grade	Remarks
95+	A++	Exceptional
90–95	A+	Outstanding
85–90	A	Very Good
80–85	B++	Good
75–80	B+	Above Average
70–75	B	Needs Improvement
<40	F	Failed

In the old grading system consisting of "Division Scheme", the range of percentage of marks is as follows:

Percentage of Marks	Division
60–100	First
45–59.99	Second
33–44.99	Third
0–32.99	Fail

Nowadays most universities of Engineering and Technology follow the grading system below:

Grade	Marks	GPA
A	90+	4.00
A−	85–89	3.7
B+	80–84	3.3
B	75–79	3
B−	70–74	2.7
C+	65–69	2.3
C	60–64	2.0
C−	55–59	1.7
D	50–54	1.3
F	<50	00.00

=== Saudi Arabia ===
Most of the colleges, universities and schools in Saudi Arabia are similar to the United States except the way the grades are described.

Grade		Percentage	GPA
Excellent; Arabic: ممتاز	A+	95–100	4.0
Excellent; Arabic: ممتاز	A	90–94	3.75
Very good Arabic: جيد جداً	B+	85–89	3.50
Very good Arabic: جيد جداً	B	80–84	3.0
Good; Arabic: جيد	C+	75–79	2.50
Good; Arabic: جيد	C	70–74	2.0
Acceptable; Arabic: مقبول	D+	65–69	1.50
Acceptable; Arabic: مقبول	D	60–64	1.0
Failure; Arabic: راسب	F	0–59	0.0

In other universities in Saudi Arabia such as Imam University, King Saud University, King Abdulaziz University, King Khalid University, Princess Nourah bint Abdulrahman University and King Faisal University, the following method is used:

Grade		Percentage	GPA
Excellent; Arabic: ممتاز	A+	95–100	5.0
Excellent; Arabic: ممتاز	A	90–94	4.75
Very good Arabic: جيد جداً	B+	85–89	4.50
Very good Arabic: جيد جداً	B	80–84	4.0
Good; Arabic: جيد	C+	75–79	3.50
Good; Arabic: جيد	C	70–74	3.0
Acceptable; Arabic: مقبول	D+	65–69	2.50
Acceptable; Arabic: مقبول	D	60–64	2.0
Failure; Arabic: راسب	F	0–59	1.0

=== Singapore ===
Academic grading in Primary school (Grades 1 to 6)

Percentage	Grades
90–100	AL1
85–89	AL2
80–84	AL3
75–79	AL4
65–74	AL5
45–64	AL6
20–44	AL7
0–19	AL8

Primary 5 to 6 (Foundation)

Percentage	Grades
75 to 100	AL-A [equal to AL-6]
30 to 74	AL-B [equal to AL-7]
29 or less	AL-C [equal to AL-8]

Academic grading in Secondary school (Grades 7 to 10)

Percentage	Grades
75–100	A1
70–74	A2
65–69	B3
60–64	B4
55–59	C5
50–54	C6
45–49	D7
40–44	E8
0–39	F9

Academic grading in College-Preparatory Junior College (Grades 11 to 12)

Percentage	Grades	Pass/Fail
70–100	A	Pass
60–69	B	Pass
55–59	C	Pass
50–54	D	Pass
45–49	E	Pass
40–44	S	Sub-Pass
0–39	U	Fail

Academic Grading for ITE/Polytechnics

Polytechnics			Institute of Technical Education			Remarks
Score	Grade	Grade Point	Score	Grade	Grade Point	Remarks
80–100	A	4.0	80–100	A	4.0	May be awarded Distinction (AD/Z) for top 5% of cohort.
75–80	B+	3.5	70–79	B	3.0	
70–74	B	3.0	70–79	B	3.0	
65–69	C+	2.5	60–69	C	2.0	
60–64	C	2.0	60–69	C	2.0	
55–59	D+	1.5	50–59	D	1.0	
50–54	D	1.0	50–59	D	1.0	Minimum passing grade in consideration.
0–49	F	0.0	0–49	F	0.0	

Autonomous Universities

Singapore has six autonomous universities, namely National University of Singapore (NUS), Nanyang Technological University (NTU), Singapore Management University (SMU), Singapore Institute of Technology (SIT), Singapore University of Social Sciences (SUSS) and Singapore University of Technology and Design (SUTD). Each uses different grading scale and degree classification. Upon graduation, students will receive degree classification according to their CGPA/CAP.

Although the passing point for Singaporean autonomous universities is 1.0. However, students would receive academic termination if their CGPA/CAP fell below 2.0 or 2.5 for two consecutive semesters, depending on the course of study.

Grading Systems (NUS/NTU/SIT/SUSS/SUTD)

Grade	Score equivalent	Universities/Point	
Grade	Score equivalent	NUS/NTU/SIT/SUSS	SUTD
A+	85–100	5.0	5.3
A	80–84	5.0	
A−	75–79	4.5	
B+	70–74	4.0	
B	65–69	3.5	
B−	60–64	3.0	
C+	55–59	2.5	
C	50–54	2.0	
D+	45–49	1.5	
D	40–44	1.0	
F	0–39	0.0	

Grading Systems (SMU)

Grade	Score equivalent	Point
A+	86–100	4.3
A	83–85	4.0
A−	80–82	3.7
B+	77–79	3.3
B	74–77	3.0
B−	70–73	2.7
C+	66–69	2.3
C	63–65	2.0
C−	60–62	1.7
D+	53–59	1.3
D	50–52	1.0
F	0–49	0.0

Degree Classifications (NUS/NTU/SIT/SUSS/SUTD)

CAP/CGPA	Classification				Remarks
CAP/CGPA	Honours Degree		Basic Degree		Remarks
CAP/CGPA	NUS/NTU/SUTD/SIT/SIT (DigiPen)*	NUS**/NTU**/SUSS	NUS	SUSS	Remarks
4.50 – 5.00	Honours (Highest Distinction)	First Class Honours	Pass with Merit	Pass with Merit	At least A− in Honours thesis/project
4.00 – 4.49	Honours (Distinction)	Second Class (Upper)	Pass with Merit	Pass with Merit	
3.50 – 3.99	Honours (Merit)	Second Class (Lower)	Pass with Merit	Pass with Merit	
3.20 – 3.49	Honours	Third Class	Pass with Merit	Pass with Merit	
3.00 – 3.19	Honours	Third Class	Pass with Merit	Pass	
2.00 – 2.99	Pass	Pass	Pass	Pass	
0.00 – 1.99					Students will not graduate.

*Student admitted prior to AY2012/2013

**Student admitted from AY2020 cohort onward

Degree Classifications (SMU)

CGPA	Classification
3.80 – 4.0	Summa Cum Laude (With Highest Distinction)
3.60 – 3.79	Magna Cum Laude (With High Distinction)
3.40 – 3.59	Cum Laude (With Distinction)
3.20 – 3.39	High Merit
3.00 – 3.19	Merit

=== South Korea ===
Middle School (7th–9th grade)
Points are the student's raw score in midterms and finals (out of 100).

Points	Grades
80–100	A
60–80	B
40–60	C
20–40	D
0–20	F

High School (10th–12th grade)

The percentage is the students' relative position among other students taking the same subject (100% is the highest, 0% is the lowest).

Percentile	Grades
96–100	1등급 / Grade 1
89–96	2등급 / Grade 2
77–89	3등급 / Grade 3
60–77	4등급 / Grade 4
40–60	5등급 / Grade 5
23–40	6등급 / Grade 6
11–23	7등급 / Grade 7
4–11	8등급 / Grade 8
1–4	9등급 / Grade 9
0–1	10등급 / Grade 10

University

The following grades are listed as those of universities in South Korea; the system listed is particularly similar to that utilized in the United States.

Percentage	Grade	GPA
85–100	A+	4.5
80–84	A	4.0
55–79	B+	3.5
40–54	B	3.0
35–39	C+	2.5
30–34	C	2.0
25–29	D+	1.5
20–24	D	1.0
0–20	F	0.0

=== Thailand ===
Most undergraduate studies in Thailand use the following 8-point grading system:

Percentage	Grade	Description	GPA
80–100	A	Excellent	4.0
75–79	B+	Good	3.5
70–74	B	Good	3.0
65–69	C+	Fair	2.5
60–64	C	Fair	2.0
55–59	D+	Bad	1.5
50–54	D	Bad	1.0
0–49	F	Fail	0.0

For graduate and post-graduate studies, universities sometimes use the following 10-point grading system:

Grade	Description	GPA
A	Excellent	4.0
A−	Excellent	3.67
B+	Good	3.33
B	Good	3.00
B−	Good	2.67
C+	Fair	2.33
C	Fair	2.00
C−	Fair	1.67
D	Bad	1.00
F	Fail	0.00

=== United Arab Emirates ===
Primary education is free at government run schools. The grading is managed by the Ministry of Education. However, there are multiple schools run by expatriates that are equally successful with their own grading system, or an accepted grading system of the country where the schools are affiliated to or share common standards with. At most universities and colleges, the United Arab Emirates' grading system is similar to the United States' system.

=== Vietnam ===
The grading scale in Vietnam is from 10 to 1 where 10 is the highest, as follows:

Grade	Description
10	Excellent
9	Good
8	Acceptable
7	Satisfactory
5–6	Sufficient
2–4	Insufficient
1	Fail

Schools and universities in Vietnam use a 10-point grading scale, with 10 being the highest and 0 being the lowest, as follows.

Grade	Description
8.0–10	Good
6.5–8.0	Middling
5.0–6.5	Average
3.5–5	Weak
<3.5	Fail

The grading may vary from school to school. It depends on the difficulty of each.

The distribution of grades differs from standards in Western countries and strongly depends on the university. In Vietnamese universities, ten or nine is nearly impossible. Students rarely score higher than 8.0 on their final results.

== Central America ==
=== Panama ===
The grading system in Panama is different from universities than schools.

Universities use 0–100 point grade scaling similar to the United States grading. 71 is required to pass, or roughly the equivalent of a C. Schools use the 1–5 point system, meaning if a student has a 4.5 that is the equivalent of an A− or somewhere around the 95-point range.

When it comes to grade point average (GPA), Panama uses a 0–3 point scale to determine the student's GPA. For instance, if a student has a 2.5 GPA, that is roughly the same as a U.S. student having a 3.0–3.5.

== Europe ==
=== Albania ===
In Albania, grades from 4 to 10 are used, with some schools allowing decimals (up to the hundredth digit) and others only allowing whole numbers.

Grade	Description
9.00–10.00	Excellent
8.00–8.99	Very good
7.00–7.99	Good
6.00–6.99	Satisfactory
5.00–5.99	Sufficient
1.00–4.99	Insufficient

Most universities evaluate classes with two mid exams and a final. The final exam encompasses the whole course syllabus, whereas the mid exams usually review half. In some schools, if the average grade of the two mid exams is equal to or higher than 7.00, the student is able to pass the class without needing to take a final exam (since there are only two exams, some teachers also pass students who average 6.50; others weigh in the decision based on the student's performance in class). An average of less than 4.00 is failing; students who score such an average are not allowed to take the final exam.

In high schools, the year is divided into three trimesters and classes are usually yearlong. Students need an average of 6.00 or higher in all the three trimesters exams to avoid having to take a final to pass the class. In the event of a student scoring less than 6.00 in the third trimester, he or she would have to take a final exam, regardless of average. This is considered controversial since the last trimestral exam is not more important than the first two, but the rule stands to prevent students who have already reached the minimum average (e.g., two 10.00 in the first two give a student the lowest possible average of 6.33) from not making an effort during the last three months of the year. One's time at a university typically lasts 3–5 years.

=== Austria ===
In Austria, grades from 1 to 5 are used.

Grade	Percentage	Description
1	90–100	Sehr gut (Really good)
2	80–89	Gut (Good)
3	64–79	Befriedigend (Satisfactory)
4	51–63	Genügend (Sufficient)
5	0–50	Nicht genügend (Insufficient)

The formalized overall grade in Austria is "pass with distinction" (mit ausgezeichnetem Erfolg bestanden), which is given for excellent performance (average of 1.5 and better, no grade below 3) and "pass" (Bestanden, no grade below 4).

If someone is given a "pass with distinction" in their Matura, Diploma and PhD, all curricula absolved in the regular duration time they can have a 'promotio sub auspiciis presidentis rei publicae', (literally "under the auspices of the President of the Republic", meaning that the President will personally attend the graduation ceremony), which is the highest honor in Austria only achieved by 1 out of 2,500 graduates (.04%) yearly.

Generally speaking, a cumulative Grade Point Average does not exist in the Austrian educational system and therefore has little relevance in the local job market.

=== Armenia ===
In Armenia, the 10-point grading scale is as follows:

Grade	Description
9–10	գերազանց (Excellent)
7–8.99	լավ (Good)
4–6.99	բավարար (Satisfactory)
<4	անբավարար (Fail)

To convert to percentage (on the 10-point scale), the grade is multiplied by 10.

=== Belgium ===
In Belgian universities a scale from 0 to 20 is used on a per-subject basis; a weighted average is then computed on scale from 0 to 20, with 10 being the passing grade per subject. A total average of around 14 (70%) earns a distinction grade (cum laude), around 16 (80%) means high distinction (magna cum laude) and an average of around 18 (90%) yields the highest distinction (summa/maxima cum laude). The exact scores for each grade differ between different universities.

Belgian secondary schools use a scale from 0 to 100 or even above for exams (50 usually being the passing grade). On report cards, certain schools also give grades on a percentage scale (0 to 100) while others use a 0–10 scale. Those total scores are weighted averages of exams and tests. In Belgian secondary schools, there are 6 years. In the first three years, students have to do exams every term. The scores are usually given in percentages. At the end of the school year, a total average score is given.

University colleges (another form of higher education, not comparable with American colleges) use the same scale from 0 to 20 as Belgian universities, although homework and presence may influence sometimes up to 50% or more of these 20 points (situation as of February 2011). It is more common to have a final exam counting for 100% of the grade if the course does not require laboratory work. Obtaining a grade higher than 16/20 is considered as a very good grade and a 19 or 20/20 is very rare.

Scaling varies significantly depending on the university or college.

=== Bosnia and Herzegovina ===
In Bosnia and Herzegovina, grades from 5 to 1 are used in primary and secondary education, while grades from 10 to 5 are used at universities.

Primary and secondary education grading:

Grade	Letter Grade	Label	Description
5	A	Odličan (Excellent)	Best possible grade
4	B	Vrlo dobar (Very good)	Next highest grade/Above average
3	C	Dobar (Good)	Average performance
2	D	Dovoljan (Sufficient)	Lowest passing grade
1	E/F	Nedovoljan (Insufficient)	Failing grade

University grading:

Grade	Percentage	Description
10	95–100	Exceptional
9	85–94	Excellent
8	75–84	Very good
7	65–74	Good
6	55–64	Sufficient – lowest passing grade
5	0–54	Insufficient – failing grade

=== Bulgaria ===
In Bulgaria, the following grade scale is used in schools:

Grade	Letter Grade	Percentage	Description	Notes
6	A	87.5–100	Отличен (Excellent)	Best possible grade
5	B	62.5–87.49	Много добър (Very good)	Next highest
4	C	40.75–62.25	Добър (Good)	Average performance
3	D	30–40.5	Среден (Average)	Lowest passing grade
2	F	0–29.75	Слаб (Weak)	Failing grade
1	N/A	N/A	Лош (Bad)	Punishment for cheating

For examinations and tests, exact grading is often used and is represented by two positions after the decimal point:

Grade	Letter Grade	Percentage	Description	Notes
5.50–6.00	A	84–100	Отличен (Excellent)	Best possible grade
4.50–5.49	B	62.5–83.75	Много добър (Very good)	Next highest
3.50–4.49	C	40.75–62.25	Добър (Good)	Average performance
3.00–3.49	D	30–40.5	Среден (Average)	Lowest passing grade
2.00–2.99	F	0–29.75	Слаб (Weak)	Failing grade

Grades like Good (3.50) or Excellent (5.75) are common. Any passing grade at or above the .50 mark is prefixed with the term of the next higher grade. The lowest grade is 2.00; grades below 3.00 are failing grades, and the highest is 6.00. Grades like "Very good" (5-) and "Average" (3+) are also given, but plusses and minuses are generally ignored in calculations. The (-) or the (+) modifier is equivalent to 0.25 marks below or above the integer, but in most cases these are affixed only for the student to see how far he is from the midpoint of the grade assigned. Up to two minuses can be used, but only one plus, e.g. (6=) or (5+). Two minuses are written similar to the equal sign and it is read "on rails" (на релси), e.g. 6= is read "six on rails" (шест на релси). Despite their being equivalent to 0.25 marks, a grade like 3= is still recorded in official documents as 3. The Bad (1.00) grade is mostly obsolete and rarely given; some official electronic documents do not even permit it to be entered.

Roughly, the Bulgarian grade system can be equated to the American one like the following: 6=A, 5=B, 4=C, 3=D, and 2=F. Also, in accordance with the Australian system, 6=HD, 5=D, 4=Cr, 3=P, and 2=F.

The most common formula used in Bulgarian schools is currently Grade=(6* number of correct answers)/ total number of questions. That way if a student has answered 7 out of 10 questions correctly, their mark should be: (6*7)/10=4.20, which is graded as Good 4 or average performance. Another common formula is Grade = 2 + ((4* number of correct answers)/total answers). That way if a student has answered 7 out of 10 questions correctly, their mark would be: 2 + (4*7)/10 = 4.80, which is graded as Very Good 5.

=== Croatia ===
In Croatia, the following grade scale is used in schools:

Grade	Letter Grade	Description	Notes
5	A	Odličan/Izvrstan (Excellent)	Best possible grade
4	B	Vrlo dobar (Very good)	Next highest
3	C	Dobar (Good)	Average performance
2	D	Dovoljan (Sufficient)	Lowest passing grade
1	F	Nedovoljan (Insufficient)	Failing grade

At the end of each semester the grades are averaged to form a Grade Point Average (prosječna ocjena), according to this scale:

Grade	Letter Grade	Description	Notes
5.00–4.50	A	Odličan/Izvrstan (Excellent)	Best possible grade
4.49–3.50	B	Vrlo dobar (Very good)	Next highest
3.49–2.50	C	Dobar (Good)	Average performance
2.49–2.00	D	Dovoljan (Sufficient)	Lowest passing grade
1.99–1.0	F	Nedovoljan (Insufficient)	Failing grade

In colloquial Croatian, grades are referred to be their numerical values: jedinica, dvojka, trojka, četvorka, petica. Students with failing grades (1 or F) are allowed to carry those grades throughout the school year, but are required to improve them to passing grades (2 or better) in order to finish the year. Failure to pass one class results in the student being held back a year.

=== Czech Republic ===
In the Czech Republic, a five-point grading scale is used in both primary and secondary schools:

Grade	Description	Notes
1	Výborný (Excellent)	The best grade achievable − U.S. 'A' equivalent
2	Chvalitebný (Commendable)	U.S. 'B' equivalent
3	Dobrý (Good)	U.S. 'C' equivalent
4	Dostatečný (Sufficient)	U.S. 'D' equivalent
5	Nedostatečný (Insufficient)	Failing grade − U.S. 'E/F' equivalent

Plus and minus signs are often used to further differentiate marks. For example, "2+" corresponds to the U.S. 'B+'. Half-intervals may also be used, such as "2–3", a grade halfway between 2 and 3.

At the university level, only grades 1, 2 and 3 are passing; anything worse than 3 is automatically a failing grade. Some universities use a six-point scale, with 'A' corresponding to "1", 'B' to "1–2", etc.

=== Denmark ===
The current scale, syv-trins-skalaen ("The 7-step-scale"), was introduced in 2007, replacing the old 13-skala ("13-scale"). The new scale is designed to be compatible with the ECTS-scale.

Syv-trins-skalaen consists of seven different grades, ranging from 12 to −3, with 12 being the highest. This new scale remains an "absolute" scale, meaning that, proportions are not taken into consideration.

Grade	ECTS Grade	Description
12	A	Fremragende (Excellent)
10	B	Fortrinlig (Very good)
7	C	God (Good)
4	D	Jævn (Average)
02	E	Tilstrækkelig (Sufficient)
00	F	Utilstrækkelig (Insufficient)
−3	F	Ringe (Poor)

=== Estonia ===
Percentage	Grade	Description
90–100	5	Very good
75–89	4	Good
50–74	3	Passable
20–49	2	Not passable
0–19	1	Failed

In universities:

Percentage	Grade	Description
91–100	A	Excellent
81–90	B	Very good
71–80	C	Good
61–70	D	Satisfactory
51–60	E	Passable
0–50	F	Failed

Tallinn University of Technology uses numerical grades from 5 (the highest) to 0 (the lowest) with the same percentages.

=== Finland ===
Several systems are in use in different educational institutions in Finland. The "school grade" system has historically been a scale of 0 to 10, but all grades lower than 4 have been discarded. Thus, it is now divided between 4, the failing grade, and 5–10, the succeeding grades. Upper secondary school has the same grades for courses and course exams as a comprehensive school but matriculation examination grades are in Latin. Universities and vocational institutions use a scale of 0 (fail) and 1–5 (pass) or fail/pass. Some schools e.g. Savon Ammatti- ja Aikuisopisto, uses grading from 0 (fail) and 1–3 (pass). The professor selects which grading scheme is used; short, optional courses typically have pass/fail grades.

=== France ===
In France, school grades typically range from either 0 (worst) to 20 (best) or, sometimes, from 0 (worst) to 10 (best). A mark below the average (10 out of 20 or 5 out of 10, depending on the scale) is usually a fail. For the French National High School Level (baccalauréat), a grade of 8–10 typically gives the right to take an additional oral exam in order to try to improve that average to 10 and pass. A grade between 10 and 12 is a simple pass (without grade); between 12 and 14 (more rarely 13–14) the grade is called "assez bien" (rather good); 14–16 is called "bien" (good); above 16 is "très bien" (very good). For the diplôme national du brevet, awarded after the class of 3ème, the scale ranges from 0 to 800, with 400 being the minimum passing grade, 480 and above being "assez bien", 560 and above being "bien", and 640 above being "très bien", 720 and above being "très bien avec les félicitations du jury"

Before university, there's usually no minimum required to pass to the next year, and the decision is upon the council of the school, which means an average grade under 10 can be sufficient to pass. This follows a tendency of failing and retrying a year being less and less frequent in France.

In more difficult curricula, such as CPGE or 1st year of medicine, the average grade is usually so low that students pass or fail depending on their rank within the class, and anything above 7 or 8 can be considered a good grade.

World Education Services grade equivalence between France and the U.S.

Scale	US grade equivalent
14–20	A
12–13.9	B+
11–11.9	B
10.5–10.9	B−
10	C
9–9.9	C−
8–8.9	D
0–7.9	F

=== Germany ===
In Germany, school grades vary from 1 (very good, sehr gut) to 6 (insufficient, ungenügend). In the final classes of German Gymnasium schools that prepare for university studies, a point system is used with 15 points being the best grade and 0 points the worst. The percentage causes the grade can vary from teacher to teacher, from subject to subject and from state to state. The percentages shown in the table are the ones used in the "Oberstufe" (final classes).

German grading system
Percentage	Grades			Description	U.S. Equivalent
(Varies by school)	1st–10th grade	11th–13th grade	Fachhochschule/Universität	Description	U.S. Equivalent
90–100%	1+	15 points	1.0	Sehr gut (very good: an outstanding performance)	A+
90–100%	1	14 points	1.0	Sehr gut (very good: an outstanding performance)	A
90–100%	1−	13 points	1.3	Sehr gut (very good: an outstanding performance)	A-
75–89%	2+	12 points	1.7	Gut (good: exceeds the requirements considerably)	B+
75–89%	2	11 points	2.0	Gut (good: exceeds the requirements considerably)	B
75–89%	2−	10 points	2.3	Gut (good: exceeds the requirements considerably)	B-
60–74%	3+	09 points	2.7	Befriedigend (satisfactory: fulfills average requirements)	C+
60–74%	3	08 points	3.0	Befriedigend (satisfactory: fulfills average requirements)	C
60–74%	3−	07 points	3.3	Befriedigend (satisfactory: fulfills average requirements)	C-
45–59%	4+	06 points	3.7	Ausreichend (sufficient: meets requirements despite flaws)	D+
45–59%	4	05 points	4.0	Ausreichend (sufficient: meets requirements despite flaws)	D
0–44%	4−	04 points	5.0	Mangelhaft/Ungenügend (insufficient: a deficient performance)	F
0–44%	5+	03 points	5.0	Mangelhaft/Ungenügend (insufficient: a deficient performance)	F
0–44%	5	02 points	5.0	Mangelhaft/Ungenügend (insufficient: a deficient performance)	F
0–44%	5−	01 points	5.0	Mangelhaft/Ungenügend (insufficient: a deficient performance)	F
0–44%	6	00 points	5.0	Mangelhaft/Ungenügend (insufficient: a deficient performance)	F

* This conversion scheme is intended as a guideline, as exact conversions may differ.

=== Georgia ===
School	University		Description	Notes
10	A	91–100	ფრიადი (Excellent)	Best possible grade
9	B	81–90	ძალიან კარგი (Very good)	Next highest
8	C	71–80	საშუალო (Average)	Average performance
6–7	D	61–70	დამაკმაყოფილებელი (Satisfactory)	Satisfactory grade
5	E	51–61	საკმარისი (Enough)	Lowest passing grade
0–5	F	0–50	ჩაჭრა (Fail)	Failing grade

=== Greece ===
- Scale: 0.00–10.00 (0–100%)
- Pass (module): 5.00 (50%)

The table below depicts the Greek Grading system while illustrates approximately how the Grades are compared with ECTS, US and UK grades:

Greece (0.00–10.00)	ECTS	US (0.0–4.0 or 5.0)	UK (0–100%)
Ἀριστα (Excellent) (8.50–10.00)	ECTS A	A, A+	First-Class Honours^{*} (First or 1st) (70–100%)
Λίαν Καλώς (Very good) (6.50–8.49)	ECTS B	B, B+, A−	Upper Second-Class Honours (2:1) (60–69%)
Καλώς (Good) (5.00–6.49)	ECTS C	C, C+, B−	Lower Second-Class Honours (2:2) (50–59%)
No assessment/award at the end of 4th or 5th year, until all modules, from all years, are passed successfully. Years are extended.		C−, D	Third-Class Honours (Third or 3rd) (40–49%)
Withdrawal		F	Ordinary degree(Pass) (without Honours) (35–39%)^{[a]} Fail (0–34%)

For the National Technical University of Athens (NTUA) the above grades are different: 9–10 is "excellent", 7–9 is "very good", 5–7 is "good", 0–4.9 is "fail".

=== Hungary ===
In Hungary, five-point scale and three-point scales are in use. For the five point scale, there is one failing grade: 1 – elégtelen (insufficient). In general, the lowest passing mark is either 50% or 60%, or one mark (point) higher. Passing grades are 2 – elégséges (sufficient or pass), 3 – közepes (mediocre or satisfactory), 4 – jó (good) and 5 – jeles (very good). The perfect overall performance is named kitűnő or kiváló (excellent).

The bare five-point scale is used for final grades at all educational levels (elementary school, high school, university). During the academic year, however, teachers may use various modifiers, especially in elementary school. A comma (,) after the grade has a minus effect ("alá", below), and an apostrophe (’) after the grade has a plus effect ("fölé", above); a grade halfway between two integers is indicated by the lower and higher one separated by a solidus: 3/4 ("háromnegyed") is equivalent to 3.5, and 4/5 is between 4 and 5, etc. Sometimes 5^{*}, five starred ("csillagos ötös") is used to indicate outstanding performance throughout the semester (only in primary school, as it would be considered childish in secondary school).

Grade	Meaning (Hungarian)	Translation
5	Jeles	Very Good
4	Jó	Good
3	Közepes	Satisfactory or Mediocre
2	Elégséges	Pass or Sufficient
1	Elégtelen	Fail or Insufficient

The three-point scale may be used in college/university settings as a final grading for some courses.

Grade	Meaning (Hungarian)	Translation
5	Kiválóan megfelelt	Passed with distinction
3	Megfelelt	Passed
1	Nem felelt meg	Failed

=== Iceland ===
Universities in Iceland categorize their grades as follows

GPA	Name	Description
10–9.0	Ágætiseinkunn	First Grade with distinction
8.99–7.25	Fyrsta einkunn	First Grade
7.24–6.0	Önnur einkunn	Second Grade
5.99–5.0	Þriðja einkunn	Third Grade

Primary school grades were changed in 2011, with the adoption of a new national curriculum from 0–10 into the following:

Grade	Percentage	Description	Advanced description
A	99+	Excellent	The student shows outstanding ability in the field as a reference field of study described. On admission to a college, student has the ability to work on the second phase of the study stage.
B+	82–93	Very good	The student has achieved all learning outcomes with a score of A. Upon entry into the college, student has the ability to work on the second phase of the study stage.
B	65–81	Good	The student shows good ability in the field as a reference field of the study described. On admission to a college, student has the ability to work on the subject area, but you may need to go to the extra phase in Icelandic, mathematics and English.
C+	50–64	Bad	The student has achieved all learning outcomes C and partly to the criteria of the rating of B. Upon entry into the college, student has the ability to work on the first phase of the study stage.
C	35–49	Very bad	The student shows that he has, to some extent, the competence criteria describing learning division. On admission to a college, student has the ability to work on the first phase of the study stage.
D	<34	Fail	The student has not reached the competence assessment criteria to describe the subject area. On admission to a college, student has the ability to work on the first phase of the study stage and may need individualized. A student who gets D in two of the three main subjects to apply for a preparatory study − also applies to those who are marked * rating.
O	0	Unworthy of marking	

=== Ireland ===
The two government regulated educational qualifications are the Junior Cycle (previously the Junior Certificate, usually taken at 15/16) and the Leaving Certificate (usually taken at between the ages of 17 and 19). In April 2025, Helen McEntee announced the changes to grade bands, evenly distributing the top 4 grades to 15 percent each.

Percentage	Grade
85–100	Distinction
70–84	Higher Merit
55–69	Merit
40–54	Achieved
30–39	Partially Achieved
0–29	Fail

Passing or failing the Junior Cert (or any exams in Irish secondary schools), has no bearing on whether or not students can graduate or continue on.

For the Leaving Certificate, a points system is used. Previously, this consisted of lettered and numbered grades (A1, A2, B1, B2), with each grade separated by 5%, bar an A1 which was given for a mark over 90%. However, this was updated for the 2016/2017 Leaving Cert cycle and these letters were replaced by H (higher level), O (ordinary level) and F (foundation level). Each grade is separated by 10%. A maximum of 6 subjects are counted, with a possible 100 points in each subject. For students sitting the higher level maths paper, an extra 25 points can be obtained by getting a grade above a H6. In practice, most students take 7 or 8 subjects and their best 6 results are counted. Each subject has 2 or 3 levels: higher, ordinary and foundation. The points are:

Grade	Percentage	Higher Level Points	Ordinary Level Points	Foundation Level Points
H1/O1/F1	90–100	100	56	20
H2/O2/F2	80–89	88	46	12
H3/O3/F3	70–79	77	37	0
H4/O4/F4	60–69	66	28	0
H5/O5/F5	50–59	55	20	0
H6/O6/F6	40–49	44	12	0
H7/O7/F7	30–39	33	0	0
H8/O8/F8	0–29	0	0	0

The points system allocates all university places in Ireland for Irish applicants.

Irish universities vary in their grading systems. For example, UCD (University College Dublin) awards letter grades and corresponding GPA values similar to the United States system, but 1, 2.1, 2.2 etc. for degrees, while TCD (Trinity College Dublin) awards all grades as 1, 2.1, 2.2 etc.

=== Italy ===
In Italy, primary school do not use grades but descriptive judgements based on levels, a new conception introduced in December 2020, that is not a simple ordinal scale, but it is used to describe each level across four main dimensions, i.e. continuity (Does the student carry out the task consistently or only occasionally?), autonomy (Is the student autonomous in carrying out the task or does she/he need help by the teacher?), resources (To accomplish the task, does the student use only the resources provided by the teacher or also other resources?) and the setting (Is the task already known as a drill task, or is it a new task to students?).

Levels	Setting	Resources	Continuity	Autonomy
Advanced	Known and novel	External and internal	Yes	Yes
Intermediate	Known and novel	External	Yes	Yes
Basic	Known	External	No	Yes
Entry	Known	External	No	No

Levels are used to underpin descriptive judgments on a set of specific learning objectives for each school subject. They are not used to evaluate the single task but the pupils performance on a long period on the report cards (mid-term and finals), as the dimension of continuity needs more than one assessment task to be evaluated.

Levels can be accompanied with longer descriptive judgments on the specific characteristics of each student for each subject, and are oriented toward a formative approach and students improvement.

Italian secondary school grades may vary from 10 (excellent) to 1 (impossible to assess), with passing being 6.

Percentage	Grade	Description
100	10	Outstanding
90–99	9	Excellent
80–89	8	Very good
70–79	7	Good
60–69	6	Pass
50–59	5	Almost pass
40–49	4	Bad
30–39	3	Very bad
20–29	2	Very, very bad
0–19	1	Impossible to assess

Note: 0 is used very rarely.

When a professor wants to apply a more precise scale and ranking for students assessments, instead of using the full 1–10 scale (which would make the scale inconsistent with that of other professors), s/he may sometimes have recourse to a plethora of symbols and decimals: the range between 5 and 6 is then expressed, in ascending order, by 5+, 5½, and 6− (or 5/6, named "5 to 6"). The minimum passing is 6. As these symbols (except ½) have no clear mathematical value (usually ±0.25), calculating end-year averages can be somewhat arbitrary and inconsistent; therefore, there has been a push since 2008 with the Gelmini reform to uniform the system to the 1–10 scale.

Before this reform, primary and secondary school grades used a different grading scale that expressed an assessment of the pupil's progress:

- Ottimo ("Excellent")
- Distinto ("Very Good")
- Buono (Good)
- Sufficiente (Pass)
- Insufficiente (Fail)

A recent school reform provides for the average grade of a student to include the grade for behavior; as in academic subjects, acceptable ratings range from 6 to 10.

In universities, a point system is used for exams, with 30 points being the best grade and 18 the minimum passing grade. This stems from the practice that exams were traditionally given by 3 examiners. Each had to rate the student's examination performance on a 1–10 scale, and the final grade was the sum of the three ratings. On a 1–10 scale, passing is 6, so on a 1–30 scale the minimum passing grade is 3*6 = 18. Nowadays the form of each examination is decided by the professor (number of examiners, whether written, oral, or both, etc.), but the traditional grading system remained.

Degrees have an analogous point system, in which however the highest grade is 110. A cum laude notation (e lode in Italian) is used to augment the highest grade for both exams and degrees, in all its levels, to reflect truly outstanding performance.

==== Summary ====
- Primary and secondary school
  - 10-point grading scale; highest result 10, pass result 6
- Licenza media (commonly known as "Terza media")
  - 10-point grading scale; highest result 10 e lode, pass result 6
- Maturità
  - 100-point grading scale; highest result 100 e lode, pass result 60
- University
  - Exams: 30-point grading scale; highest result 30 e lode, pass result 18
  - Laurea (bachelor's degree) and laurea magistrale (master's degree): 110-point grading scale; highest result 110 e lode, pass result 66

=== Kosovo ===
In Kosovo, grading is as follows:

Grade	Description
5	Shkëlqyeshëm (Excellent)
4	Shumë Mirë (Very Good)
3	Mirë (Good)
2	Mjaftueshëm (Lowest passing grade)
1	Dobët (Failure)

=== Latvia ===
The academic grading system in Latvia is using ten-point scale, where "10" (Latvian: desmit) is the highest achievable grade, and "1" (Latvian: viens) is awarded for extremely poor performance. The minimal passing grade is "4" (Latvian: četri). In most universities, to get the "4", you must acquire at least 50% correct on the work you hand in. Though some universities have a minimum passing grade of "5" (Latvian: pieci).

The absence of any kind of performance is indicated by "nv" (Latvian: nav vērtējuma 'no assessment possible'); in the past, The mark for absence of work was "0" (Latvian: nulle). Teachers for minor assignments are encouraged to award either grades by percentage or STAP system. For percentage grades, 0% is awarded for extremely poor performance and 100% is awarded for exceptional work. The grade of 10 is reserved for exceptional achievements. 9 is most commonly used for a United States equivalent of an A. In some cases, the grade can be rounded for example if a student got 67% the grade can sometimes be rounded to a 7.

Grade	Percentage (school)	Percentage (university)	Description
10	95–100	90–100	Izcili (Outstanding)
9	85–94	85–89	Teicami (Excellent)
8	76–85	80–84	Ļoti labi (Very good)
7	68–75	75–79	Labi (Good)
6	60–67	70–74	Gandrīz labi (Almost good)
5	44–59	65–69	Viduvēji (Satisfactory)
4	35–43	60–64	Gandrīz viduvēji (Almost satisfactory)
3	18–34	40–59	Vāji (Bad – failed)
2	9–17	20–39	Ļoti vāji (Very bad – failed)
1	0–8	0–19	Ļoti, ļoti vāji (Very, very bad – failed)

=== Lithuania ===
In Lithuania, the grading system was changed to a 10-point scale in 1993. Prior to that, Soviet Lithuania had a 5-point grading scale. 10 is the highest achievable grade for excellent performance and 1 is the lowest. Usually, 1 is given when there is no work submitted at all (called kuolas in the academic jargon, meaning 'stake'); otherwise, most teachers keep 2 as the lowest grade and rarely mark work as 1.

The lowest grade for passing a subject in the secondary education institutions is 4, while in the higher education institutions 5 is the lowest passing grade.

Grade	Percentage	Description	
Grade	Percentage	Secondary education	Higher education
10	95–100	Puikiai (Excellent)	Puikiai (Excellent)
9	85–94	Labai gerai (Very good)	Labai gerai (Very good)
8	75–84	Gerai (Good)	Gerai (Good)
7	65–74	Pakankamai gerai (Good enough)	Vidutiniškai (Average)
6	55–64	Patenkinamai (Satisfactory)	Patenkinamai (Satisfactory)
5	45–54	Pakankamai patenkinamai (Satisfactory enough)	Silpnai (Weak)
4	35–44	Silpnai (Weak)	Nepatenkinamai (Unsatisfactory)
3	25–34	Blogai (Poor)	Nepatenkinamai (Unsatisfactory)
2	15–24	Labai blogai (Very poor)	Nepatenkinamai (Unsatisfactory)
1	0–14	*	Nepatenkinamai (Unsatisfactory)

Notes:

- *No answer provided, failed to complete the task (Lithuanian: Nieko neatsakė, neatliko užduoties).

=== Moldova ===
Moldova uses a 10-point scale system, 5 being the minimum grade for passing:

Grade	Description
10	Excellent
9	Very good
8	Good
6–7	Satisfactory
5	Sufficient
1–4	Unsatisfactory

=== Netherlands ===
In the Netherlands, grades from 1.0 up to 10.0 are used, with 1 being worst and 10 being best. One's score is determined by dividing the number of points acquired by the total amount. Then it is multiplied by 9 and one point is added. So if one scores a 58/64 on a test their score is calculated as following: 58 / 64 * 9 + 1 = 9.2. Sometimes points are deducted for the number of faults on a test (typically, on vocabulary or topographical tests with more than 10 questions, each fault will nonetheless lead to a reduction in score of one. So 2 faults on a 50 question vocabulary test would constitute an 8). The grades 9 and 10 are hardly ever given on large examinations (on average, a 9 is awarded in only 1.5%, and a 10 in 0.5% of the cases). Generally, either one or two decimal places are predominantly used in secondary and higher education. In primary education, fractions of grades are identified with a + or −, which signifies a quarter (converted to either 0.8 or 0.3 if only one decimal place is used). Thus, a grade of 6.75 (or 6.8) could be written as 7−, whereas a grade of 7+ would count for 7.25 or 7.3.

A 5.5 constitutes a pass, whereas 5.4 and below constitute a fail. If no decimal places are used, 6 and up is a pass and 5 and below is a fail; however, in this case of grading in full numbers there exists sometimes "6-", which would officially translate to 5.75, but can be interpreted here as "barely, but just good enough". If the grade would be a 5.49 and one decimal is used, the 5.49 will be a 5.5, but if no decimals are used (usually at the end of the year) the 5.49 will end up as a 5 which indicates a fail.

Depending on the specific university, some students who finish their studies with an average of 8.0 or higher, could get the nomination cum laude (which is comparable with summa cum laude as awarded in Germany and the United States).

The grade scale with its labels:

Grade	Description	UK	USA
10	Uitstekend (Excellent)	A*	A+
9.5	Uitstekend (Excellent)	A*	A+
9	Zeer goed (Very good)	A*	A+
8.5	Zeer goed (Very good)	A*	A+
8	Goed (Good)	A	A
7.5	Ruim voldoende (More than sufficient)	A−	A
7	Ruim voldoende (More than sufficient)	B	B+
6.5	Voldoende (Sufficient)	C	B
6	Voldoende (Sufficient)	D	C
5.5	Matig (Mediocre)	E	D
5	Zwak (Weak)	F	
4	Onvoldoende (Insufficient)	F	
3	Ruim onvoldoende (Strongly insufficient)	F	
2	Slecht (Poor)	F	
1	Zeer slecht (Very poor)	F	

=== North Macedonia ===
Primary and secondary education:

Grade	Letter Grade	Label	Description
5	A	одличен (odličen)	Excellent – Best possible grade
4	B	многу добар (mnogu dobar)	Very good – Next highest grade/Above average
3	C	добар (dobar)	Good – Average performance
2	D	доволен (dovolen)	Sufficient – Lowest passing grade
1	E/F	недоволен (nedovolen)	Insufficient – Failing grade

University grading:

Grade	Percentage	Description
10	91–100	Exceptional
9	81–90	Excellent
8	71–80	Very good
7	61–70	Good
6	51–60	Sufficient – Lowest passing grade
5	1–50	Insufficient – Failing grade

=== Norway ===
In primary school (Barneskole, from age 6 to 13) no official grades are given. However, the teachers write an individual comment or analysis on tests and at the end of every term.

Lower secondary school (Ungdomsskole; age 13–16) and upper secondary school (Videregående skole; age 16–19) use a scale running from 1 through 6, with 6 being the highest and 2 the lowest passing grade. It is not possible to fail a grade in Lower Secondary School; even 1 is a passing grade. For non-final tests and mid-term evaluations the grades are often post fixed with + or − (except that there is no 6+ or 1−). It is also common to use grades such as 5/6 or 4/3 indicating borderline grades. However, the grades students get on their diploma (Vitnemål), are single-digit grades 1, 2, 3, 4, 5 or 6. The student's non-weighted grade point average is also given on the Vitnemål.

In higher education, according to the ECTS-system, grades for undergraduate and postgraduate examinations are awarded according to a graded scale from A (highest) to F (lowest), with E as the minimum passing grade. The ECTS system was implemented at Norway's universities and colleges in the early 2000s, with most schools having converted to ECTS by 2003.

Before 2003, the formerly most common system of grades used at the university level was based on a scale running from 1.0 (highest) through 6.0 (lowest), with 4.0 being the lowest passing grade. The way the new Bologna system was introduced implies that students who had started their studies while the old system still was in effect will graduate with transcripts containing grades from both systems (i.e. both numbers and letters).

An academic year has two semesters, from August to December and from January to June, although exceptions occur. Courses are measured in "studiepoeng" according to the ECTS standard (European Credit Transfer System credits). A normal full-time study progression awards 60 credits (studiepoeng/stp) per year (30 per semester). Most institutions either use a 7.5, 8, 10, 12, 15 or 20-credit block system.

=== Poland ===
The most commonly used system in Polish grade schools is as follows (with usual corresponding score percentages):

Grade	Label	Description
6	cel (celujący)	Excellent (see below)
5	bdb (bardzo dobry)	Very good
4	db (dobry)	Good
3	dst (dostateczny)	Satisfactory
2	dop (dopuszczający)	Acceptable
1	ndst (niedostateczny)	Unsatisfactory

The grade 'excellent' as a final grade is usually awarded for extracurricular merit. In examinations, it is sometimes awarded for a perfect or near-perfect score (100%+, for example by answering extra-credit questions).

Grades (especially expressed numerically) can be suffixed with + (plus) or – (minus). On rare occasions, the = (double minus, 'rails') is used, especially as 2= also called "dwa na szynach" (literally: two on rails) to express the very lowest passing grade.

Before 1990, grades 1 and 6 were not used. It was grade 2 that was called "insufficient". 3=>, also called trzy na szynach (literally: three on rails) was the very lowest passing grade. The grade 6 might have been issued on rare occasions.

Post-secondary institutions use a different system, usually consisting of the following grades (with usual corresponding score percentages):

Grade	Percentage	Label
5.0	91–100	Bardzo dobry (very good)
4.5	81–90	Dobry plus (good plus)
4.0	71–80	Dobry (good)
3.5	61–70	Dostateczny plus
3.0	51–60	Dostateczny (satisfactory)
2.0	0–50	Niedostateczny (unsatisfactory)

The scores corresponding to each grade vary greatly from institution to institution and from course to course, but usually, a score of 50% or 51% is required to obtain the lowest passing grade (3.0). The notations zal. (zaliczony – passed) and nzal. (niezaliczony – not passed) are used when the course only requires attendance and/or is not important (such as sports).

=== Portugal ===
In Portuguese primary and middle schools, up until the 9th grade inclusive, the grading system is as follows:

Grade	Percentage	Description
5	90–100	Very good or excellent – best possible grade
4	70–89	Good
3	50–69	Satisfactory – indicates average performance
2	20–49	Unsatisfactory
1	0–19	Poor – lowest possible grade

From the 10th grade onwards, including tertiary education, a 20-point grading scale is used, with 10 passing grades and 10 failing grades, with 20 being the highest grade possible and 9.5, rounded upwards to 10, the minimum grade for passing. This 20-point system is used both for test scores and grades.

=== Romania ===
The system used in Romanian primary schools is as follows:

Grade	Description
Foarte Bine (FB)	Very good
Bine (B)	Good
Sufficient/Satisfăcător (S)	Pass
Insufficient/Nesatisfăcător (I)	Fail

In secondary schools, high schools, and academic institutions, a 10-point scale is used (with no official names for the grades), 5 being the minimum grade for passing:

Grade	Permilleage	Description
10	950–1000‰	Excellent
9	850–949‰	Very good
8	750–849‰	Good
7	650–749‰	Satisfactory
6	550–649‰	Satisfactory
5	450–549%	Sufficient
4	350–449‰	Unsatisfactory
3	250–349‰	Unsatisfactory
2	150–249‰	Unsatisfactory
1	100–149‰	Unsatisfactory

There is no 0 and no way to have such a score, because all examinations include at least one starting point; some regular tests, especially in the lower grades, may have 2 or 3. Usually, grades are specified as numbers with two decimals (8.60). The minimum passing grade is 5.

If a student scores 86%, he will be given a grade of 8.60, which will be rounded to a 9. Further, for a score of 94%, a grade of 9.40 is given that is rounded down to 9. The average of grades have two decimals, thus a student can earn an average grade of e.g. 9.55. However, the rounding is applied before average computation, so that a student who gets the grades 8.50 and 9.75 will have them rounded to 9 and 10, making the average for that subject 9.50.

The same style of grading is used in the national exams, such as the Bacalaureat and the Evaluare Națională. However, in the Bacalaureat, the average between all subjects must be at least 6 in order to pass, besides each test's grade having to be at least 5.

In addition, no matter the starting points, the grade 1 is "awarded" to students who are caught trying to copy or engage in other means of cheating during a test.

=== Russia ===
Most Russian educational institutions use a five-point grading scale:

Grade	Percentage	Label	Label (Anglicized)	Description
5	87–100%	Отлично	Otlìchno	Very good or excellent – best possible grade
4	74–86%	Хорошо	Khoroshò	Good
3	60–73%	Удовлетворительно	Udovletvorìtelno	Satisfactory/Fair – passing grade
2	<60%	Неудовлетворительно	Neudovletvorìtelno	Unsatisfactory – failing grade

Qualifiers + and − are often used to add some degree of differentiation between the grades: e.g., 4+ is better than 4, but not quite as good as 5−. Grading varies greatly from school to school, university to university, and even teacher to teacher, even for courses that lend themselves to objective markings, such as mathematics and applied sciences. Even though the grades technically range from 1 to 5, 1 is not common and is rarely given for academic reasons—in a number of cases, a 1 is given as a result of failure to show up for or to complete an exam. A 2 grade usually means that the student showed no or little knowledge in a subject.

It may be worth mentioning that 1 is a fairly exotic grade in Russian schools, but it does officially exist. The generally used grades are 2 to 5. Plus (+) and minus (−) modifiers follow the same tendency; they are rarely used in middle school and almost never in colleges or universities. Some institutions and teachers, dissatisfied with the five-point scale, work with various larger ones, but these grading systems are not recognized by the state and require conversion for official use.

A considerably more complex grading system has been implemented for the recently introduced Unified state examinations. In this system, a "primary grade" is the sum of points for completed tasks, with each of the tasks having a maximum number of points allocated to it. The maximum total primary grade varies by subject so that one might obtain a primary grade of 23 out of 37 in mathematics and a primary grade of 43 out of 80 in French. The primary grades are then converted into final or "test grades" by means of a sophisticated statistical calculation, which takes into account the distribution of primary grades among the examinees. This system has been criticized for its lack of transparency.

At universities some subjects are graded "Pass/No pass" or "Credit/No Credit" (зачёт/незачёт, pronounced "zachòt/nyezachòt"); the rest are typically graded on the five-point scale. The "Pass/No Pass" grades do not have any official numeric representation. When zachòt – (credit- or pass-) type subjects are graded as "Pass/No pass", this represents a student's knowledge of a subject. Each university applies its own standards with respect to the knowledge a student must have in order to pass a subject. Zachòt equival to pass with mark of minimum 77% to maximum 100%. Students in Russia must pass all prescribed courses in order to graduate.

Since the word zachòt can be translated variously into English (e.g. as "credit" or "pass"), this notation can create problems for Russian students applying to Western universities. Such grades may confuse Western universities and complicate the accurate calculation of students' GPAs in Western systems. For Western system "Pass" calculation recommended to perform based on averages. Western universities and equivalency organizations usually disregard zachòt, despite the fact that this notation is typically used for about half of a student's course results. Consequently, most Western GPA conversions of Russian degrees reflect only part of a candidate's coursework.

All course examinations and zachot tests must be passed at the time each is given, as there are no repeats, resits or grade appeals. Hence only those who satisfy all the requirements during the allotted examination period for each semester graduate, leaving a huge number of students behind who in the West would have had a chance to resit examinations and even get their grades reconsidered. Furthermore, grades in Russia are determined not only by examination results but also by other criteria such as class attendance and participation, term papers and projects, in-class and homework assignments, laboratory reports, presentations, and sometimes even grooming and behavior. All these must be passed during the semester before a 'final examination mark' and final zachot is awarded.

Russian degrees do not have composite classifications such as in the British system of First Class, Upper/Lower Second Class, Third Class, Pass, etc. This is because each course is examined independently, students must pass all of them, and they do not add up or contribute to an average grade or 'class'. Another reason is that during the Russian Revolution, social stratification and classification were supposedly abolished in the interest of promoting social equality. Accordingly, all students would be expected to perform at or above the minimum level required to qualify and graduate. Calculation of an aggregate mark or GPA is not considered fair or even possible, as it would be felt to disregard much of a candidate's academic work. The zachòt notation would complicate such calculation, and the final thesis qualifying mark is usually considered as the final result. Students who have shown exceptional academic talent by getting 5's in most of their courses are awarded a 'degree with excellence', which comes in a special red cover.

=== Serbia ===
Serbia has the same academic grading system of the Former Yugoslavia. In elementary schools and secondary schools, a five-point grading scale is used:

Grade	Letter Grade	Description	Notes
5	A	одлично (odlično)	Excellent
4	B	врло добро (vrlo dobro)	Very good
3	C	добро (dobro)	Good
2	D	довољно (dovoljno)	Sufficient − lowest passing grade
1	F	недовољно (nedovoljno)	Insufficient − lowest possible grade/failing grade

At the university the grade scale used is as follows:

Grade	Letter Grade	Description	Notes
10	A+	одлично (odlično)	Excellent
9	A	изузетно добар (izuzetno dobar)	Exceptionally good
8	B	врло добар (vrlo dobar)	Very good
7	C	добap (dobar)	Good
6	D	довољан (dovoljan)	Sufficient − lowest passing grade
5	F	недовољан (nedovoljan)	Insufficient − lowest possible grade/failing grade

=== Slovakia ===
In Slovakia, a five-point grading scale is used in primary and secondary schools:

Grade	Description	US Equivalent Percentage
1	Výborný (Excellent) – best possible grade	A (90–100%)
2	Chválitebný (Commendable)	B (75–89%)
3	Dobrý (Good)	C (55–74%)
4	Dostatočný (Sufficient)	D (30–54%)
5	Nedostatočný (Insufficient) – failing grade	F (0–29%)

Star (*) is often used to further elevate the mark 1 as 1* Jednotka s hviezdičkou (Grade one with star).

At the university level, the grades are slightly enhanced as: 1 Výborný A (Excellent), 1.5 Veľmi Dobrý B (Very Good), 2 Dobrý C (Good), 2.5 Uspokojivo D (Adequate), and 3 Dostatočne E (Sufficient) are passing; the failing grade is 4 Nedostatočne FX (Insufficient).

=== Slovenia ===
In elementary schools and secondary schools, a 5-point grading scale is used:

- 5 (odlično, excellent, A)
- 4 (prav dobro, very good, B)
- 3 (dobro, good, C)
- 2 (zadostno, sufficient, D) is the lowest passing grade.
- 1 (nezadostno, insufficient, F) is the lowest possible grade, and the failing one.

Grade	Letter Grade	Description
5	A	Odlično (Excellent)
4	B	Prav dobro (very good)
3	C	Dobro (good)
2	D	Zadostno (sufficient) − lowest passing grade
1	F	Nezadostno (Insufficient) − lowest possible grade/failing grade

At the university level is used a 10-point scale grading system:

Grade	Description
10	Exceptional results without or with negligible faults
9	Very good knowledge with some minor faults
8	Good knowledge with certain faults
7	Solid knowledge but with several faults
6	Knowledge only meets minimal criteria
≤5	Knowledge does not meet minimal criteria, the failing one

=== Spain ===
In Spain, schools grades typically range either 0 (worst) to 10 (best). A mark below 5 is usually a fail. These grades are described as follows:

Grade	Description	Notes
9.0–10.0	Honors (Matrícula de honor)	It is the highest possible mark typically only given to the top 5% of the class and at the discretion of the professor. Distinctions may imply tuition waivers for the following course.
9.0–10.0	Outstanding (Sobresaliente)	Very good performance
7.0–8.9	Merit (Notable)	Medium-high performance
5.0–6.9	Pass (Suficiente)	Medium performance (in pre-university education, this tier is divided as 5 – Suficiente/Sufficient, and 6 – Bien/Good)
0–4.9	Fail (Insuficiente)	The student did not succeed in passing the exam.

=== Sweden ===
Since the autumn of 2012, grades in Sweden have been given to students in the 6th grade and above. Previously, grades were given from the 8th grade for multiple years. Students below the 6th grade receive an estimation of their knowledge in each subject from their teachers. The current Swedish national grade scale has been used since 2011 and contains six grades which translate to a number of points, as shown below.

Points	Current scale	Old Scale
20	A	MVG (Pass with Special Distinction)
17.5	B	−
15	C	VG (Pass with Distinction)
12.5	D	−
10	E	G (Pass)
0	F	IG (Fail)

The grades A to E are passing grades, while F denotes failure. Grades A, C and E all have different requirements and the requirements for A are, naturally, the hardest to reach. The grades B and D are given when a student has met all the requirements for the grade below (E or C) and a majority of the requirements for the grade above (C or A).
When a student reaches the end of the Swedish nine-year-school and Upper Secondary School, their 17 best grades and points are turned into a qualification value (max 340 points) which they use to apply for their next level of education.

=== Switzerland ===
Switzerland has a grading scheme from 1 to 6, where 6 is the highest, 1 the lowest, and 4 the minimum pass mark; anything below 4 designates insufficient performance. It is used on all levels of education, such as primary schools, lower and higher secondary schools, universities, and vocational education.

Except this general pattern, the meaning and the calculation of the grades is subject to the respective cantonal office of education. The cantonal office of educations usually follow the following pattern:

Grade	Percentage	Description
6	95–100	Very good (German: sehr gut, French: très bien, Italian: molto bene)
5.5	85–95	Good to very good
5	75–85	Good (gut, bien, bene)
4.5	65–75	Satisfying (befriedigend)
4	55–65	Sufficient (genügend, suffisant, sufficiente)
3	35–55	Insufficient (ungenügend, insuffisant, insufficiente)
2	15–35	Poor (schwach, mauvais)
1	0–15	Very poor (sehr schwach, très mauvais)

A final mark can be any of the discrete number between 1 and 6, or anything between two of them usually rounded up or down to the next half or quarter value (.25, .5, .75), or to one or two digits behind the decimal point.

An oversimplified way to calculate a grade is: (acquired points/total points ) × 5 + 1 = grade.

=== Turkey ===
In Turkey, high school exam grades are from 0 to 100. But final grades are from 1 to 5 in the report cards given to the student at the end of every semester and education year of elementary, middle, and high schooler.

Percentage	Grade	Description
85–100	5	Pekiyi (Very Good)
70–84	4	İyi (Good)
60–69	3	Orta (Mediocre)
50–59	2	Geçer (Pass)
0–49	1	Zayıf (Fail)

In Undergraduate education, regulations are generally according to the US grade system, depends on the university rules.

Percentage	Grade	Letter Grade	Description
90–100	4.00	AA	Pekiyi (Excellent)
85–89	3.50	BA	İyi-Pekiyi (Very good)
80–84	3.00	BB	İyi (Good)
70–79	2.50	CB	Orta-İyi (Good-Centrum)
60–69	2.00	CC	Orta (Centrum)
50–59	1.50	DC	Orta-Geçer (Centrum-Pass)
45–49	1.00	DD	Geçer (Pass)
35–44	0.50	FD	Pass-Fail
00–34	0.00	FF	Fail
−	0.00	NA	Absent

=== Ukraine ===
Current grading system was introduced in Ukraine in autumn 2000.

The Ukrainian system for middle and high school provides grades that lie within 1 and 12. The lowest passing grade is 4. Additionally, the grades are divided into four levels: initial (1–3), sufficient (4–6), average (7–9) and high (10–12).

Grade	Level		Oral analogue
Grade	Ukrainian	English	Oral analogue
12	Високий (В)	High	Exceptional
11	Високий (В)	High	Excellent
10	Високий (В)	High	Almost excellent
9	Достатній (Д)	Average	Very good
8	Достатній (Д)	Average	Good
7	Достатній (Д)	Average	Fairly good
6	Середній (С)	Sufficient	Above satisfactory
5	Середній (С)	Sufficient	Satisfactory
4	Середній (С)	Sufficient	Adequate
3	Початковий (П)	Initial	Almost adequate
2	Початковий (П)	Initial	Poor
1	Початковий (П)	Initial	Very poor

=== United Kingdom ===
==== England and Wales ====
GCSE exams are graded as follows in England and Wales. Grade marks fluctuate based on national results.

English system	Welsh system	Description
9	A*	The highest grade available. Equivalent to a high "A*" in the old grading system.
8		Equivalent to a low A* in the old grading system.
7	A	Equivalent to an A in the old grading system.
6	B	Equivalent to a B in the old grading system.
5	C	Equivalent to a high C in the old grading system. This is generally considered to be the preferred minimum grade to enter Level 3 courses.
4		Equivalent to a low C in the old grading system. This is generally considered the absolute minimum grade to enter Level 3 courses.
3	D	The English 3 is equivalent to a D to a high E in the old grading system.
2	E	The English 2 is equivalent to a low E to an F in the old grading system.
	F	
1	G	Equivalent to a G in the old grading system.
U	U	Equivalent to a U in the old grading system. This is awarded to those who failed the subject.
X	X	This is awarded to those who were entered for a subject, but did not sit the examination(s).

A-Level

A-Level exams are graded as follows. Grade marks fluctuate based on national results.

Grade
A*
A
B
C
D
E

Grading in universities

A degree may be awarded with or without honours, with the class of an honours degree usually based on a weighted average mark of the assessed work a candidate has completed. The degree classifications are:

- First class honours (1st)
- Second class honours, upper division (2:1)
- Second class honours, lower division (2:2)
- Third class honours (3rd)
- Ordinary degree (pass)

UK Postgraduate Grading System

The postgraduate grading system for master's degrees in the UK is similar to the Honours system but differs in some points. The minimum passing grade is 50% instead of 40%. The complete classifications look as follows:

- Distinction: 70–100%
- Merit: 60–69%
- Pass: 50–59%
- Fail: Less than 50%

==== Scotland ====
Despite grade marks fluctuating based on national results, the Scottish Qualifications Authority grading scheme goes as follows for National 5, Higher and Advanced Higher:

Percentage	Grade	Description
70–100%	A	Highest grade
60–69%	B	Very strong pass
50–59%	C	Pass and be accepted by universities
40–49%	D	Borderline: the student has passed but will not be recognised by Universities, indicating they should resit that course
0–39%	No Award	The student has failed the course

For National 3 and 4 courses in Scotland, the only grades are as follows:

Percentage	Grade
40–100%	Pass
0–39%	Fail

=== European academic grading ===
With the exception of Liechtenstein, which uses the Swiss grading system, and Moldova, which uses the Romanian grading system, the majority of European countries create their own academic grading standards. Most involve combinations of the key elements of grading, and all are used to evaluate students' performance on a scale of passing to failing (or comprehending to not comprehending material).

Austria, Belgium, Bosnia and Herzegovina, Bulgaria, Croatia, Czech Republic, Finland, France, Germany, Greece, Hungary, Italy, Latvia, Lithuania, Luxembourg, Norway, Poland, Portugal, Romania, Serbia, Slovakia, Slovenia, Spain, Sweden, Switzerland, Ukraine, United Kingdom

== North America ==
=== Canada ===
Conversions by province from percentage marks to letter grades and correspondent grade points are as follows:

==== Alberta ====
Letter Grade	Percentage	Provincial standing	Notes
A	90–100	Exceeds Standard	Final course grades in this range are annotated with Honors Standing in the Alberta Senior High School.
B	80–89	Standard	
C	70–79	Below standard	
D	60–69	Cusp of Failing standard/marginal pass; may not be sufficient to take a course at a higher level	
F	0–59	Failing grade	

In Alberta's post-secondary colleges, technical institutes, or universities, the actual percentage associated with letter grade is up to the individual institution or professor teaching the course.

Letter Grade	Grade Points	Percentage
A+	4.2	95–100
A	3.9	90–94
A−	3.7	85–89
B+	3.3	80–84
B	3.0	75–79
B−	2.7	70–74
C+	2.3	67–69
C	2.0	63–66
C−	1.7	60–62
D+	1.3	55–59
D	1.0	50–54
E/F	0.0	0–49

The 4.33 is scored as a 4.00 at the University of Alberta, Southern Alberta Institute of Technology, MacEwan University, and the University of Calgary.

There is no universal percentage grade associated with any letter grade in the province of Alberta and such associations are made by professors or a bell curve. A student may be awarded an Honours designation on parchment if semester and cumulative grade point average of 3.7 is achieved on the first attempt of courses required towards graduation of major. In addition, students will need to complete graduation requirements within specific time restrictions. D is the minimum general passing letter grade to receive credit for a course. Certain faculties may require higher grades to receive course credit.

Some universities in Alberta have used a nine-point stanine grading scale: 9=A+, 8=A/A–, 7=B+/B, 6=B–/C+, 5=C, 4=D, 0 to 3=F.

==== British Columbia ====
The following table is only an approximation; faculties within universities sometimes follow a different system for converting percentage marks to letter grades.

The University of British Columbia uses a percentage grading scale.

Simon Fraser University uses a 4.33-point grading scale.

GPA	Letter Grade	Description
4.33	A+	Excellent
4.00	A	Excellent
3.67	A−	Excellent
3.33	B+	Good
3.00	B	Good
2.67	B−	Good
2.33	C+	Satisfactory
2.00	C	Satisfactory
1.67	C−	Marginal
1.00	D	Marginal
0.00	F	Failure

Secondary schools in the School District 38 of Richmond use another grading scale.

GPA	Percentage	Letter grade	Description
4.0	90–100	A	Excellent
3.0	80–89	B	Good
2.5	70–79	C	Fair
2.0	60–69	D	Bad
1.0	50–59	E	Minimally acceptable
0	0–49	F	Failure

In some faculties, such as the School of Engineering Sciences program at its Faculty of Applied Sciences, a course grade score of a D is considered a fail if it is a prerequisite course.

The University of Victoria uses a 9-point grading scale alongside a percentage-based system.

GPA	Percentage	Letter Grade
9	90–100	A+
8	85–89	A
7	80–84	A−
6	77–79	B+
5	73–76	B
4	70–72	B−
3	65–69	C+
2	60–64	C
1	50–59	D
0	0–49	E/F

==== Manitoba ====
The University of Manitoba uses a 4.5-point scale GPA system.

GPA	Letter Grade	Description	Percentage
4.50	A+	Exceptional	90–100
4.00	A	Excellent	80–89
3.50	B+	Very good	75–79
3.00	B	Good	70–74
2.50	C+	Satisfactory	65–69
2.00	C	Adequate	60–64
1.00	D	Marginal	50–59
0.00	F	Failure	0–49

GPA is Calculated taking total "points" and divided by school credit hours.

==== Newfoundland and Labrador ====
In Newfoundland and Labrador at Memorial University:

Letter	Percentage
A	80–100
B	65–79
C	55–64
D	50–54
F	0–49

Grade F is the sole failing mark.

==== Nova Scotia ====
In most Nova Scotia universities:

Letter	Percentage
A+	90–100
A	85–89
A−	80–84
B+	77–79
B	73–76
B−	70–72
C+	65–69
C	60–64
C−	55–59
D	50–54
F	0–49

Grade F is the sole failing mark.

==== Ontario ====
Percentage and grade equivalence

Grade points for 1.0 credits	Percentage equivalency
A+	90–100
A	85–89
A−	80–84
B+	77–79
B	73–76
B−	70–72
C+	67–69
C	63–66
C−	60–62
D+	57–59
D	53–56
D−	50–52
F	0–49

The University of Ottawa uses a grade point average system with numbers ranging from 0 to 10 despite multiple schools using the 12 point system.

Official grading system at the University of Ottawa: Letter grade, numerical value, and percentage equivalency

Letter Grade	Numerical Value	Percentage
A+	10	90–100
A	9	85–89
A−	8	80–84
B+	7	75–79
B	6	70–74
C+	5	65–69
C	4	60–64
D+	3	55–59
D	2	50–54
E	1	40–49
F	0	0–39

==== Quebec, New Brunswick ====
In Quebec and New Brunswick universities:

Letter Grade	Grade Point	Description	Percentage
A+	4.33	Excellent	95–100
A	4.00	Excellent	90–94
A−	3.66	Very good	85–89
B+	3.33	Very good	80–84
B	3.00	Very good	75–79
B−	2.66	Good	70–74
C+	2.33	Good	65–69
C	2.00	Good	60–64
C−	1.66	Passable	55–59
D+	1.33	Passable	50–54
D	1.00	Passable	40–49
E	0.66	Failure (échec)	35–39
F	0.33	Failure (échec)	30–34
G	0.00	Failure (échec)	0–29

This scale is used by at least UQTR. The Université de Montréal scale is similar but goes from A+ to F. Université Laval uses a similar 4.33 scale. UQAM, Concordia University and Université de Sherbrooke uses a 4.3 scale. This scale is much alike multiple other scales used in Canada.

McGill University and the École Polytechnique de Montréal use a 4.0 scale. Université de Sherbrooke scale is from A+ to E.

The percent equivalent of each grade and the passing mark can vary. The passing mark in high school and college is 60%.

==== Saskatchewan ====
The University of Saskatchewan and University of Regina both use a percentage grade system, universal across faculties and departments.

Percentage	Letter grade equivalent	Description
90–100	A+	Exceptional/outstanding performance
80–89	A	Excellent/very good performance
70–79	B	Good/above average performance
60–69	C	Generally satisfactory, intellectually adequate performance
50–59	D	Barely acceptable performance
0–49	F	Unacceptable performance

=== Mexico ===
Mexican schools use a scale from 0 to 10 to measure students' scores. Since decimal scores are common, a scale from 0 to 100 is often used to remove the decimal point.

In some universities, students who fail a subject have the option of taking an extraordinary test (examen extraordinario) that evaluates the contents of the entire period. Once the test is finished and the score is assessed, this score becomes the entire subject's score, thus giving failing students a chance to pass their subjects. Those who fail the extraordinary test have two more chances to take it; if the last test is failed, the subject is marked as failed and pending, and depending on the school, the student may fail the entire year.

Some private schools (particularly in higher levels of education) require a 70 to pass instead of the regular 60.

Grades are often absolute and not class-specific. It may be the case that the top of the class gets a final grade of 79. Curve-adjustment is rare. Grad-level students are usually expected to have grades of 80 or above to graduate. Students in the honor roll are usually those with an overall GPA of 90 or higher upon graduation, and some private universities will award them a "With Honors" diploma. Additionally, in some private universities, the pass scores are higher or lower depending from the kind of studies that are related with (for example, in some universities, in the case of Engineering, the minimum score is 7.3 and for Art, Sciences is 8.8).

=== United States ===
The most popular and commonly used grading system in the United States uses discrete evaluation in the form of letter grades. A number of schools use a GPA (grade-point average) system in combination with letter grades. There are also multiple other systems in place. Some schools use a scale of 100 instead of letter grades. Others, including multiple Montessori schools, eschew discrete evaluation in favor of pure discursive evaluation. There is no standardized system of grading in the United States. As such, those issues are left up to individual universities, schools and the regulatory authority of the individual states.

At most schools, colleges and universities in the United States, letter grades follow a five-point system, using the letters A, B, C, D and E/F, with A indicating excellent, C indicating average and F indicating failing. Additionally, most schools calculate a student's grade point average (GPA) by assigning each letter grade a number and averaging those numerical values. Generally, American schools equate an A with a numerical value of 4.0. Most graduate schools require a 3.0 (B) average to take a degree, with C or C− being the lowest grade for course credit. Most undergraduate schools require a 2.0, or C average to obtain a degree with a minimum of D or D− to pass a course. For most secondary schools, the minimum overall and course passes are both D or D−. Some districts, such as Mount Olive Township School District in New Jersey, have eliminated D as a passing grade for their students due to a high failure rate.

Whereas most American graduate schools use four-point grading (A, B, C, and E/F), several do award D grades but still require a B average for a degree qualification. Some American graduate schools use nine- or ten-point grading scales, formerly including the Rackham School of Graduate Studies at the University of Michigan, where 9.0 = A+, 8.0 = A, 7.0 = A−, and so on. (Rackham switched to a more conventional four-point scale in August 2013.)

In a handful of states, GPA scales can go above 4.0.

The percentage needed in any given course to achieve a certain grade and the assignment of GPA point values varies from school to school, and sometimes between instructors within a given school. The most common grading scales for normal courses and honors/Advanced Placement courses are as follows:

	Normal Courses					Honors/AP Courses	
Grade	Standard	10 points scale	7 points scale	Wyoming System	GPA	Percentage	GPA
A	92–100	90–100	93–100	95–100	4.000	94–100	4.500–5.000
B	83–91	80–89	85–92	86–94	3.000–3.999	87–93	3.500–4.499
C	74–82	70–79	77–84	80–85	2.000–2.999	80–86	2.500–3.499
D	65–73	60–69	70–76	74–79	1.000–1.999	75–79	1.500–2.499
E/F	0–64	0–59	0–69	0–73	0.000–0.999	0–74	0.000–1.499

Some states may use an alternate grading scale such as the following which is commonly used.

Grade	Percentage
A	90–100
B	80–89
C	70–79
D	60–69
E	0–59

Whether a school uses E or F to indicate a failing grade typically depends on time and geography. Around the time of World War II, several states began to use E, while the majority of the country continued to use the F, which traces to the days of Pass/Fail grading (P and F). In recent years, some schools have begun using an N for failing grades, presumably to represent "No Credit". Another letter used to represent a failing grade is U, representing "unsatisfactory."

Chromatic variants ("+" and " − ") are used. In most 100-point grading systems, the letter grade without variants is centered around a value ending in five. The "plus" variant is then assigned the values near the nine digit and the "minus" variant is assigned the values near zero. Any decimal values are usually rounded. Thus, a score of 80 to 82 is a B−, a score 83 to 86 is a B and a score of 87 to 89 is a B+. The four-point GPA scale, the letter grade without variants is assigned to the integer. The "plus" and "minus" variants are then assigned to .3 above the integer and .3 below the integer, respectively. Thus, a B is equal to 3.0, a B+ is equal to 3.3, and a B− is equal to 2.7.

The A range is often treated as a special case. In most American schools, a 4.00 is regarded as perfect and the highest GPA one can achieve. Thus, an A, being the prime grade, achieves the mark of a 4.00; for the A+ mark, most schools still assign a value of 4.00, equivalent to the A mark, to prevent deviation from the standard 4.00 GPA system. However, the A+ mark, then, becomes a mark of distinction that has no impact on the student's GPA. A few schools, however, do assign grade values of 4.33 or 4.30; but the scale is still called "4.0", because grading scales (or "quality indices") take their numerical names from the highest whole number.

In multiple American high schools, students may also score above 4.0 if taking advanced, honors, Advanced Placement, or International Baccalaureate classes (for example, a "regular" A would be worth four points, but an A earned in an advanced class might be worth 4.5 or 5 points towards the GPA.). This is called a weighted GPA.

In middle and high schools that do not use a system based on academic credit, the grade point average is computed by taking the mean of all grades. In colleges and universities that use discrete evaluation, the grade-point average is calculated by multiplying the quantitative values by the credit value of the correlative course and then dividing the total by the sum of all credits.

For example:

Class	Credits	Grade	Grade Points
Speech 101	3	A	3 × 4.0 = 12.0
Biology 102	4	B+	4 × 3.3 = 13.2
History 157	3	B−	3 × 2.7 = 8.1
Physical Education 104	1	C	1 × 2.0 = 2.0

- Total Credits: 11
- Total Grade Points: 35.3
- Grade Point Average: 35.3 / 11 = 3.209 or slightly below B+

In a standards-based grading system, a performance standard is set by a committee based on ranking anchor papers and grading rubrics, which demonstrate performance which is below, meeting, or exceeding the "standard." This standard is intended to be a high, world-class level of performance, which must be met by every student regardless of ability or class, although they are actually set by a committee with no reference to any other national standard Levels are generally assigned numbers between zero and four. Writing papers may be graded separately on content (discussion) and conventions (spelling and grammar). Since grading is not based on a curve distribution, it is entirely possible to achieve a grading distribution in which all students pass and meet the standard. While such grading is generally used only for assessments, they have been proposed for alignment with classroom grading. However, in practice, grading can be much more severe than traditional letter grades. Even after ten years, some states, such as Washington, continue to evaluate over half of their students as "below standard" on the state mathematics assessment.

Here is another example of a commonly used grading scale, currently in place at Wayzata High School in Plymouth, Minnesota. The Grade Point Average is not the traditional four-point scale, but uses the 12-point scale for unweighted classes and the 15-point scale for weighted classes:

Grade	Percentage
A+	97–100
A	93–96
A-	90–92
B+	87–89
B	83–86
B-	80–82
C+	77–79
C	73–76
C-	70–72
D+	67–69
D	63–66
D-	60–62
F	Below 59

The 12-point GPA scale works as follows. Students receive 12 points for an A or A+, 11 points for an A−, 10 points for a B+, etc. for each grading period. Once a grading period is complete, the student's total grade points are divided by the total number of credits and a GPA is generated.

For example, here is one term of grades and a grade point average from a student whose school uses the 86-minute block schedule (such as Wayzata High School):

Class	Grade Points
Math 4X (1 credit)	95.06/A = 12
Chemistry X (1 credit)	87.39/B+ = 10
Symphonic Band (1 credit)	99.76/A+ = 12
AP United States History (1 credit)	92.57/A− = 11
Total	45 Grade Points/4 Credits = 11.25 (Slightly better than A−, equivalent to 3.75)

==== Standards-based grading ====
Standards-based grading is a well-known practice of assessment. It provides students with learning expectations and an in depth way of evaluation students. It is not the most common assessment method but it provides students with developmental feedback. Researchers have determined that students who were previously exposed to standards-based grading reflected higher performance.

==== Alternative grading methods ====
Alternative grading methods offer a diverse way of assessing student progress. Recent studies reveal that alternative grading methods may lead to more applicable growth opportunities for students over time. These methods can include portfolios, narrative evaluations, contract grading, developmental meetings and verbal feedback. These methods provide insight to evaluation methods and emphasize student progress and improvement. Some alternative grading methods include contract grading, the Waldorf assessment style, and narrative evaluation.

Contract grading emphasizes learning behaviors. Most students are accepting of contract grading; however, the data shows that fewer than half of students noted they found it helpful and less stressful than letter grades. Most students that dislike this method were advanced students and found the process to be repetitive.

The Waldorf assessment style consists of developmental meetings and an evaluation letter. Waldorf grading methods focused more on what they were learning rather than how well each student applied it. It emphasizes positive feedback and progress. Some people may label it as unstructured, others may describe it as a personalized and relaxed style of learning and assessment. Waldorf philosophy strongly reiterates the growth and improvement of the students.

Narrative evaluation can be defined as detailed written feedback. Studies show that over half of students really like narrative evaluation. It focuses on improvement and provides personal detail of how students have grown. It allows for more personalized feedback and eliminates the competitive nature of students to compare themselves to their classmates.

=== Cuba ===
Grading scale in Cuba varies by schools and colleges.

Letter Grade	Scale #1 (Standard)	Scale #2	University
A	86–100	88–100	93–100
B	77–85	80–87	84–92
C	68–76	71–79	74–83
D	59–67	62–70	66–73
E/F	0–58	0–61	0–65

== Oceania ==
=== Australia ===
NAPLAN gradings are specified in "Bands", approximately as follows:

Marks	Band
90–100 Marks	Band 6/Exemplary
80–89	Band 5
70–79	Band 4
60–69	Band 3
50–59	Band 2
0–49	Band 1

The majority of tertiary institutions in New South Wales, Northern Territory, Queensland, South Australia and Tasmania and use the following grading structure:

Grade	Percentage	Description
HD	85+	High Distinction
D	75–84	Distinction
Cr	65–74	Credit
P	50–64	Pass
F	≤49	Fail

The majority of tertiary institutions in ACT, Western Australia and Victoria, use the following grading structure:

Grade	Percentage	Description
HD	80+	High Distinction
D	70–79	Distinction
Cr	60–69	Credit
P	50–59	Pass
F	≤49	Fail

Some other Australian universities have a marking system similar to the Honours system used by British universities:

Grade	Percentage	Description
H1	80+	First Class Honours
H2A	75–79	Second Class Honours (A Division)
H2B	70–74	Second Class Honours (B Division)
H3	65–69	Third Class Honours
P	50–64	Pass
N	<50	Fail

Many courses also have Non-Graded Pass (NGP) and Non-Graded Fail (NGF), in which it is considered more appropriate to have qualitative than quantitative assessment. However, in some universities, an F1 category may be given a 'Pass Conceded' if the student's Weighted Average is greater than a nominated threshold. (More often than not, this is around the 53–55 range.)

Grade-point averages are not generally used in Australia below a tertiary level but are important for selection into graduate entry courses such as Medicine and Law. They are calculated according to the more complicated formula than some other nations, and may be customized for the particular course application when used as entry criteria into graduate entry degrees:

Grade Point Average (GPA) = Sum of (grade points × course unit values) / total number of credit points attempted, in which grade points are as follows:

- High Distinction = 7
- Distinction = 6
- Credit = 5
- Pass = 4
- Fail level 1 = 1
- Fail level 2 = 0

At some universities, among them Macquarie University, University of Technology, Sydney, Royal Melbourne Institute of Technology (RMIT) and Monash University in Melbourne, a GPA is calculated, with 4.0 being a High Distinction; 3.0 a Distinction, 2.0 a Credit, and 1.0 a pass. In certain faculties, such as law, it is, therefore, possible to graduate with "honours" with a GPA of less than 2.5. Whenever a course result is a Non-Graded Pass, the result will normally be disregarded in GPA calculations.

Some other universities, such as the University of Melbourne, University of New South Wales, University of Sydney, and University of Wollongong use a Weighted Average Mark (WAM) for the same purpose as a GPA. The WAM is based on the raw percentage grades, or marks, achieved by the student, rather than grade points such as High Distinction or Distinction.

The term course unit values is used to distinguish between courses that have different weightings e.g. between a full year course and a single semester course.

For grading of secondary school graduates, the ATAR (Australian Tertiary Admissions Rank) system determines which students are offered positions in tertiary courses. Government Supported Positions are offered to applicants for a course who are ranked above a particular ATAR threshold, which commonly varies from course to course, institution to institution, and year to year. (An example of this is an ATAR of 85 for Bachelor of Science at the University of Melbourne.) A student's ATAR signifies that student's rank relative to their year 7 cohort, including students that did not complete year 12. A student with an ATAR of 80.00, for example, has performed, in their final year of secondary schooling, better than 80 percent of that student's year 7 cohort, had all those years 7 students completed year 12 and been eligible for an ATAR.

=== New Zealand ===
Most New Zealand secondary schools use the National Certificate of Educational Achievement (NCEA) marking schedule, even in pre-NCEA years for commonality. There are four grades, from lowest to highest, Not Achieved (N/A or N), Achieved (A), Achieved with Merit (M), and Achieved with Excellence (E). These can also be marked at certain levels for junior exams and general assignments as well as exams once the student has started NCEA. The grading for these specific marks are as follows, Not Achieved minus (N/A1 or N1), Not Achieved plus (N/A2 or N1), Achieved (A3), Achieved plus (A4), Merit (M5), Merit plus (M6), Excellence (E7) and Excellence plus (E8). It is possible to get an achieved, merit or excellence minus, but would be marked as the first number used for the grade. The difference between an achieved plus and merit minus is simply if the student has applied all of the achieved requirements but not enough merit requirements or has applied all of the achieved requirements and just enough merit requirements to reach merit. However, these grades are often check marked if that is the case and regardless of whether the student got a merit minus or straight merit, they will be rewarded with merit level credits for the assessment. The minority of schools using other secondary school qualifications (usually CIE or IB) have different grades. Grading at tertiary institutions generally centers around a letter scale, with a corresponding nine-point GPA scale (C−=1, A+=9).

== South America ==
=== Argentina ===
In Argentina, the GPA is calculated quarterly, each semester, or annually. Grades usually range from 1 to 10. The passing mark is typically 70% or around two thirds, which in secondary school is represented by a grade of 7.

Depending on the university, admittance may require:

- Completion of secondary school.
- A common basic year to all degrees or an entrance exam for some of the more popular degree programs.

University grades are also on a scale of 1 to 10, but a passing mark is represented by 4, which usually corresponds to a mark of 70–75%, or higher.

=== Brazil ===
In Brazil, the GPA – variously known as Coeficiente de Rendimento, or Índice de Rendimento Acadêmico – is updated per semester or per year or both.

==== Calculation ====
In Brazil, each school is free to define its own grading system, so exceptions may exist, but as a rule schools adopt a 0.0 or 0% (worst) to 10.0 or 100% (best) scale called a nota. Letter grades are sometimes used in addition to a numerical score, in which case the particular system (and acronyms) used by the school will be described in the student's transcript. Here is one typical example:

Grade	Letter Grade	Description
9.0 – 10.0	E	Excellent
8.0 – 8.9	VG	Very Good
7.0 – 7.9	G	Good
6.0 – 6.9	S	Satisfactory
5.0 – 5.9	M	Middling
< 5.0	F	Fail

Whatever the school, a grade below 5.0 (50%) is generally a fail, though this average varies greatly depending on region and type of school (being commonly required to be above 60% in public schools, and even up to 75% in some private institutions). In primary and secondary education, students are often permitted one recovery exam at the end of the grading period. Since Brazilian elementary and high schools are year-based and not credit-based, failing even one subject means that the student will be held back an entire year. As a result, schools may offer an interview with, or an independent evaluation by, an academic review board that has the authority to pass even those students who have failed their recovery exam, such as in the case of extenuating circumstances. These policies are all up to each individual school.

==== Usefulness ====
The High School GPA is only rarely ever used for college entrance evaluation in Brazilian universities. Although some universities allow an International Baccalaureate or High School GPA to be used as an alternate evaluation method, admission to undergraduate programs (cursos de graduação) typically involves taking an entrance exam. The largest such exam is the ENEM, a national standardized test that ranks high school students and whose score is used (through the SiSU system) for admission to over 100 public universities. Other (public and private) universities have their own exams, called vestibulares. Colloquially, the term also extends to the ENEM.

Private schools and other specialized educational institutions often ask for high GPAs when considering students for scholarship programs. Many private institutions offer incentives for students that reach the highest grade averages. Often, institutions will emphasize how many of their alums later get into public universities after as a point of prestige.

In college, the minimum passing grade is also defined by each individual university, and is typically either 6.0 or 7.0. During college, GPA is much more important than in high school because it is often used not only when considering a student for scholarships, but also undergraduate research fellowships, exchange programs. Some admissions to Master's programs (cursos de pós-graduação stricto sensu) give more importance to the student's research and their Undergraduate Thesis or Capstone Project (Trabalho de Conclusão de Curso, or "TCC"). However, it is usually taken into account for choosing which students will receive grants upon entering their Master's.

=== Chile ===
The Chilean grading system uses a numeric scale from 1.0 to 7.0, where one decimal place is usually included. The minimum passing grade is 4.0, although in practice this may correspond to percentages ranging from 50% to 70%, depending on institutional policies and instructors’ evaluation methods. Grades below 4.0 are considered a nota roja (“red mark”), indicating failure. The grading scale is regulated by the Ministry of Education of Chile and is used across primary, secondary, and tertiary education institutions.

==== Conversion to International Scales ====
Although not officially standardized, Chilean grades are often compared to international systems when evaluating transcripts abroad. The following equivalencies are commonly used by universities and credential evaluation services:

Numerical system from 1.0 to 7.0:

Numerical System	U.S. Equivalent
6.75–7.00	A+
6.50–6.74	A
6.25–6.49	A−
6.00–6.24	B+
5.75–5.99	B
5.50–5.74	B−
5.25–5.49	C+
5.00–5.24	C
4.75–4.99	C−
4.50–4.74	D+
4.25–4.49	D
4.00–4.24	D−
1.00–3.99	F

==== University Admission Exams ====
Since 2022, admission to higher education in Chile has been based on the Prueba de Acceso a la Educación Superior (PAES), which replaced the earlier PSU (Prueba de Selección Universitaria). The PAES is scored on a 100–1000 point scale, with a mean of 600 and standard deviation of 100, approximating a normal distribution. Performance is evaluated across several mandatory and elective tests, including:

- Mathematics (M1 and M2 levels)
- Reading Comprehension (Linguistics)
- Elective tests in Natural Sciences or History
- NEM (Notas de Enseñanza Media), the student's high school GPA, which is converted into the PAES scale.

Each university and program sets its own cut-off scores for admission, often giving different weights to PAES, NEM, and Ranking de Notas (relative class rank). Where can I see my NEM average in Chile?

The High School Grade Point Average (GPA), known as NEM (Notas de Enseñanza Media), is important for university admission in Chile. It reflects your academic performance throughout secondary education.

=== Colombia ===
The most used grading systems are the numerical from 0 to 5 or from 0 to 10 and commonly are approved with 3 or 6, respectively. The letter system consists of E, S, B, A, I and is approved with A. The letter system is based on the numerical, meaning that the numerical system guides the letter one. While the universities only use the numerical system, with 3.0 being the passing grade, because it is more complex and students have more difficulty in approving a course.

Numerical system from 0 to 5:

Numerical System	Letter Grade	U.S. Equivalent
4.5–5.0	Excelente (E)	A
4.0–4.4	Sobresaliente (S)	A–
3.5–3.9	Bueno (B)	B+, B
3.0–3.4	Aceptable (A)	C, C–
0.0–2.9	Insuficiente (I)	D, F

Numerical system from 0 to 10:

Numerical System	Letter Grade	U.S. Equivalent
9.0–10	Excelente (E)	A
8.–8.9	Sobresaliente (S)	A–
7.0–7.9	Bueno (B)	B+, B
6.0–6.9	Aceptable (A)	C, C–
0.0–5.9	Insuficiente (I)	D, F

It is noteworthy that most schools no longer implement the grades below 1,0 as a null performance because is believed that it might cause low self-esteem in students. Conversions of the Colombian grading scale into GPA or other grading systems are often required for international academic applications.

=== Ecuador ===
In Ecuador, the rating system is 10 out of 10, including two decimal places in both primary, secondary and university, the highest score is 10 and the lowest is 0. The minimum grade required to pass a year is 7, depending on how schools are organized. Since 2012 it enjoys complete autonomy in Ecuador, so that some establishments maintain supplementary examination for those with less than 7, and other approved intensive recovery, but if the grade obtained is lower than 5, students are automatically disqualified and disciplinary actions are taken. If a student got 10 out of 10 in 90% of subjects in the first period, he is promoted to a senior year, after taking an entrance examination. Notes and academic qualifications and groups them reasoning thus:

- 10–9.5 = Rated Excellent (A)
- 9.4–9.0 = Rated Outstanding (B)
- 8.9–8.0 = Very good credit rating (C)
- 7.9–6.5 = Rating Sufficient or Good Sufficient (D)
- 6.4–5.1 = Fail failing grade with Recovery option or supplementary examination (E)
- 5.0–1.0 = Fail automatically (F)

Grade	Letter Grade	Description
9.5–10	A	Excellent
9.0–9.4	B	Outstanding
8.0–8.9	C	Very good credit rating
6.5–7.9	D	Sufficient
5.1–6.4	E	Failing grade with recovery option or supplementary examination
1.0–5.0	F	Fail automatically

This system is still applied to universities, the "Universidad de las Fuerzas Armadas (ESPE)" being the only exception, as they do not allow their students to take supplementary exams after every course.

=== Paraguay ===
The grades vary from 1 to 4, where 4 is the maximum grade achievable and 1 the lowest. The minimum for a pass is 2 (equivalent to 60%).

Description	Grade
Excellent	4
Good	3
Average	2
Bad	1
Fail	0

=== Peru ===
Grades range from 0 to 20, in an almost unique grading table. The passing grade is 11 in most schools and universities. In some preschool facilities, grades usually range from D to A+, following the American system, and in a few colleges, the passing grade is 10.

For most Peruvian universities the grading system is as follows:

Numerical System	Description	U.S. Equivalent
18.00–20.00	Excelente	A
15.00–17.99	Muy bueno	B
11.00–14.99	Aprobado	C
00.00–10.99	Desaprobado	D

=== Uruguay ===
In Uruguay, high grades are hard to achieve. In primary school, grades range in this order:

Grade	Description
Sobresaliente (S)	Outstanding, the highest grade. Also commonly called "sote"
Sobresaliente Muy Bueno (SMB)	Excellent
Muy Bueno Sobresaliente (MBS)	Very good, almost excellent
Muy Bueno (MB)	Very good
Muy Bueno Bueno (MBB)	Good, almost very good
Bueno Muy Bueno (BMB)	Good
Bueno (B)	Pass
Bueno Regular (BR)	Insufficient, fail
Regular Bueno (RB)	Requires much more work
Regular (R)	Very bad job, the lowest grade

In secondary school, grades range from 1 to 12. 1 is the lowest and 12 is the highest. Passing an exam or course requires 6 out of 12 in high school or at a private university (although some subjects in secondary school require a grade of 7 or 8 to pass), and 3 out of 12 at a public university. In high school, a 6 corresponds to 50% on an exam or in a course while in a public university, a 3 corresponds to 60% in a course or exam. Grades of 10, 11, and 12 are considered excellent. Some private universities grade their students on a percentage basis, generally setting the passing benchmark between 60% and 70%.

Because of the acronym of the word "Sobresaliente" (Ste.), it is usually pronounced "Sote".

=== Venezuela ===
Grades in Venezuela may vary according to the education level, but normally the grading system is numerical, and ranges from 00 to 20, 00 being the lowest and 20 being the highest, and 10 being the pass mark, equivalent to a "D" in the United States. This system is not required, however, and several schools in Venezuela deviate from it by following a letter-grade system similar or identical to those in the United States.

As of 2022, a new grading system in Venezuela has been implemented which compares to other Spanish-speaking countries. The new grading system now ranges from 00 to 10, 00 being the lowest and 10 being the highest.

Shown here is the Venezuelan grading system in probable comparison with the United States grading system:

Venezuelan Grade	U.S. Percentage Equivalent	U.S. Grade Equivalent
09–10	90–100	A (excellent, highest mark)
07–08	80–89	B (good, second to highest mark)
06	70–79	C (average)
05	60–69	D (lowest passable mark)
00–04	0–59	E/F (failure)
