= Academic grading in Tunisia =

The Tunisian grading system is mostly an over 20 point grading scale: it is used in secondary schools and universities, similar to the french grading system. For primary schools, a new system has been introduced, based on a letter-grade scale; the old system uses a 10-point grading scale for the first term and a 20-point scale for the second and third terms.

Currently, most Tunisian universities use a traditional 20-point grading scale, but after the introduction of the new National Higher Education Reform, a new grading scale, similar to that of the ECTS grading scale, is becoming more and more common.

Most of the time, the formal grades used in Tunisia are not considered in graduate programs acceptance. A grade of 12 (which is actually a passable grade in Tunisia but equivalent to 60% in the US where it is considered a below average) is generally a good starting grade to apply for graduate studies and financial aids or scholarships. This is due to a severe testing and evaluation system employed in most Tunisian universities. Generally, at the national level, a grade of 12 or above is considered a good grade. This is why some European universities use a different admission requirement for Tunisian students. Tunisia's neighboring countries, Algeria & Morocco, have a very similar grading system.

Grading is Tunisia is done on a scale of 0-20 to convert it to letter or % grades refer to the table below :

Scale	Grade Description	US Grade	Notes
18.00 - 20.00	Très Bien (Very Good)	A+	Rarely awarded
16.00- 17.99	Very Good - Highest Honors (Très Bien)	A	
14.00- 15.99	Good - High Honors (Bien)	A-	
12.00 - 13.99	Assez Bien (Good Enough)	B	
10.00 - 11.99	Satisfactory (Passable)	C	
9.00- 9.99		D	Conceded pass if semester/yearly average of grades remains above 10*
0-9.00	Fail (Ajourné)	F	

*: Note that this is university/ school specific, not every institute allow this and some allow it with some changes (9.50-10 for example)
