= B- =

B- may refer to:

- B-, a blood type
- B- (grade), an academic grade
