= Academic grading in Mexico =

Academic grading in Mexico employs a decimal system, from 0 to 10, to measure the students' scores. The grades are:

- 10: Excellent (excelente)
- 9: Very Good (muy bien)
- 8: Good (bien)
- 7: Average (regular)
- 6: Sufficient (suficiente)
- 0–5.9: Insufficient/Failed (deficiente/reprobado)

Since decimal fractions are common, a scale from 0 to 100 is often used to remove the decimal point. Then, 100 becomes the highest score, and 60 the minimum passing score. Depending on the school, the official certificate may use the range 0–100, or these may be converted back to the range 0–10, allowing for some rounding and truncation.

Although the grades 0–59 are normally given in class or tests, they are not reported as such in certificates. When failed subjects are reported in written, they normally have a score of NA or N/A, standing for No Acreditada (Not Accredited) or No Aprobada (Not Approved).

Major works, such as a written thesis or doctoral dissertation, may not have a grade, but appear in certificates simply as AC, standing for Acreditada (Accredited).

Occasionally, institutions, specially private schools, may use their own grading system, but there must exist conversion rules to convert those grades to their equivalent in the decimal system.

== General education ==
Given that the scale of grading ranges from 0 to 100, it is common that the grade indicates the percentage of correct answers in a given exam.

Grades are most often absolute and not class-specific. Thus, it may be that the top student of the class gets a low grade of 70, while the passing threshold is still 60. That is, curve-adjustment of scores is rare.

Students in honor roll are usually those with an overall grade point average of 90 (very good) or more upon graduation. In that case, depending on the school or university, the student may be awarded a "With Honors" diploma.

== Higher education ==
Higher-level educational institutions, such as degree-awarding universities, require a minimum score of 70 (average) to pass a subject, instead of the regular 60.

In many universities, such as federal institutes of technology, an overall grade point average of 90 (very good) or better entitles the student to graduate with honors, other requirements such as a final work or thesis being waived, and automatically awards him or her the professional license (cédula profesional).

=== Postgraduate education ===
Students holding a Bachelor's degree require at least an overall grade point average of 80 (good) to be allowed to enrol for a master's or a doctoral degree.

At this level, the minimum passing grade is still 70, but students are required to obtain a minimum grade of 80 to be awarded their postgraduate degree. Also, a score of 80 may be required to maintain other benefits such as a federal scholarship.

== Equivalence with other grading systems ==
Compared to the US and Canada, Mexico uses a grading system that can be converted into the US's letter grade equivalency. For example, a Mexican numeral grade of 90 can be equivalent to the US's letter grade of an A. An 80 can be converted to a B, and so on. The following chart shows the following GPA range and their equivalencies.

Mexican system	US system	GPA scale
9.0–10.0	A	3.5 – 4.0
8.0–8.9	B	3.0 – 3.49
6.0–7.9	C, D	2.0 – 2.99
0–5.9	E, F	Below 2.0

For example, "a straight-A student" may be translated as un estudiante de puro 10, or "a straight-10 student".

Other grading systems, such as those used in European countries, or the United States GPA values 0.0–4.0, are less common, but can be converted.
