= Academic grading in Romania =

In Romanian primary schools, a 4-point grading scale is used:

- Foarte Bine (FB, very good)
- Bine (B, good)
- Suficient/Satisfăcător (S, pass)
- Insuficient/Nesatisfăcător (I, fail)

In secondary schools, high schools, and universities, a 10-point scale is used, 5 being the minimum grade for passing.

Grade	Description		Equivalents
Grade	Description		ECTS
10	excellent	high level of command of all aspects – no or only a few minor weaknesses	A
9	very good	high level of command of most aspects – only minor weaknesses	A−
8	good	major level of command – small weaknesses	B
7	satisfactory	fair level of command – some weaknesses	C
6	satisfactory	fair level of command – significant weaknesses	C
5	sufficient	the minimum requirements for acceptance	E
4	insufficient	almost sufficient, not acceptable	Fx
3	poor performance	rudimentary knowledge of the subject	F
2	very poor performance	no knowledge of the subject	F
1	academic dishonesty	awarded for academic dishonesty (cheating) and given as a starting point	F

Specifications such as + and −, half grades, and grades like 6/7 are sometimes used. Note that the grades used in primary school are derived from this scale, with Insufficient meaning "4 or less", and the other grades standing for 5-6, 7-8 and 9-10 respectively. A 10 is not an uncommon grade, especially in low-interest subjects. A 9 is usually considered an excellent grade. The average grade ranges between 7 and 8. A very poor performance is usually awarded a 3 or 4, while a 1 is often reserved for cases of academic dishonesty or some other unacceptable behavior. Grades with 2 decimal digits can also be awarded, e.g. 7.38 means "'very' satisfactory", although in the register (catalog, where grades are written) the grade will be rounded. Grades with 2 decimal digits can also be awarded in certificates of final examinations in secondary schools, but in that case, they are not rounded.

The same system (10-point scale) is used in Moldova, Finland and Vietnam, including in primary school. However, in Finland all grades lower than 4 have been consolidated into a grade of 4.
