= Academic grading in Luxembourg =

In Luxembourg, a grade system from 01 to 60 is used in secondary schools. A grade of at least 30 is required to pass. An insufficient mark (01-29) is called a Datz in Luxembourgish. The grades are distributed in the following way:

Grade Number	Description
50-60	Very Good
40-49	Good
30-39	Satisfactory/Sufficient
20-29	Insufficient
10-19	Poor
01-09	Very Poor

But in the secondary schools who are technique otherwise called général is much more different. It introduces intermediate grades (26-29, 36-39 and 46-49 ) whether the teachers will decide if the student will pass to the level is the next one or the past one. Unlike the normal grading system (shown above), the grading system of the secondary school général has 5 so-called levels. The notes are :

Grade Number	Description
50-60	Excellent
46-49	Excellent or strong
40-45	Strong
39-36	Strong or sufficient
30-35	Satisfactory/Sufficient
29-26	Sufficient or insufficient
20-25	Insufficient
01-19	Very insufficient

Grading at the University of Luxembourg instead operates with a French-style 20-point scale, with a minimum score of 10/20 required to pass.
