= Academic grading in Slovenia =

Academic Grading System in Slovenia

Slovenia inherited the academic grading system of the Socialist Federal Republic of Yugoslavia. A five-point grading scale is used in primary and secondary schools:

- 5: excellent (odlično, best possible grade; usually 90%+)
- 4: very good (prav dobro, usually 80%+)
- 3: good (dobro, usually 65%+)
- 2: sufficient (zadostno, lowest passing grade; usually 50%+)
- 1: insufficient (nezadostno, lowest possible grade; failing)

Many teachers use minus and plus symbols as grade modifiers. For example, "−5" denotes a grade slightly lower than "excellent", while "+4" denotes a grade slightly higher than "very good". Half-grades such as "4/5" are also used. However, these modifiers are unofficial and do not appear in final grade reports.

In universities, a six-level grading scale is used:

- 10 – excellent (best possible grade)
- 9 – very good
- 8 – very good
- 7 – good
- 6 – sufficient (lowest passing grade)
- 5 or less (failing grades)
