= Academic grading in Vietnam =

The Vietnamese grading system is an academic grading system utilized in Vietnam. It is based on a 0 to 10-point scale, similar to the US 1.0-4.0 scale. Typically when an American educational institution requests a grade-point average (GPA) calculated on the 4 point scale, the student will be expected to do a direct mathematical conversion, so 10 becomes 4.0, 7.5 becomes 3.0, etc.

The practice of most Vietnamese colleges is not to provide official transcripts to other universities on behalf of their students. Students can request a signed and stamped original transcript from their school, and then have copies certified with a red stamp at a government office. Translation services are also available at such offices.

== Grade conversion table ==
Source: EducationUSA Vietnam, U.S. Embassy in Hanoi.

Vietnam's Grading System	Equivalents		Vietnamese Description	English Description	% of students receiving this score
9-10	A+	4.0	Xuất sắc	Outstanding	Less than 5% of students
8-9	A	3.5	Giỏi	Excellent / Very Good	5-10%
7	B+	3.0	Khá	Good	About 20-25%
6-7	B	2.5	Trung Bình	Average	About 40-50%
5-6	C	2.0	Yếu	Marginal	About 5-10%
<5	D/F	=<1.0	Kém/Không đạt/Trượt	Fail	For fail courses

In practice, most U.S. universities used a standardized acceptance of A, B, C, D's only. Thus any A+, B+, C+ will be down-convert to A, B, C respectively.

Standardized Table to Convert University GPAs

Vietnam's Grading System	Equivalents		Vietnamese Description	English Description
8.0-10.0	A	4.0	Giỏi	Excellent / Outstanding
6.5-7.9	B	3.0	Khá	Good
5.0-6.4	C	2.0	Trung Bình	Average
3.5-4.9	D	1.0	Yếu	Marginal
<3.5	F	0.0	Kém/Trượt	Fail

== Credit hours ==
Some universities in Vietnam employ a system of standardized credit hours, which can translate directly over to the U.S. system. Some instead simply note class hours of 15, 30, 45, 60... etc., in an arrangement which needs to be converted into credit hours by dividing class hours by 15. Thus a 15-hour class is equivalent to 1 credit hours, a 45-hour class is equivalent to 3 credit hours.

== Method of calculating GPAs ==
Most universities convert GPAs class by class. Each class is evaluated for credit hour equivalency. Each class grade point is evaluated according to the native Vietnamese system, converted to A, B, C, D, F, and the individual class grade is translated to the 4.0 system. Then, one must multiply each class grade point by the number of credit hours for the respective class. Finally, the points are totalled up, and divided by the total number credit hours, to arrive at the final GPA.

The original article can be found at the U.S. Embassy's Education USA office located at: 1st Floor, Rose Garden Tower, 170 Ngoc Khanh St., Hanoi, Vietnam.

https://common.usembassy.gov/wp-content/uploads/sites/124/2023/01/grading-in-vietnam-.pdf

== High school credit system ==
High schools seem to use a slightly modified GPA system, with higher criteria to receive the equivalent grading letter scale. High school classes are standardized in most Vietnamese public schools, with the respective classes and Grade Point tables listed below.

Vietnamese Standardized High School Classes
Vietnamese names	English names
Toán	Mathematics
Vật lí	Physics
Hóa học	Chemistry
Sinh học	Biology
Tin học	Informatics
Ngữ văn	Literature
Lịch sử	History
Địa lí	Geography
Ngoại ngữ (Tiếng Anh,...)	Foreign language (English,...)
Âm nhạc	Music
Mỹ Thuật	Art
Công nghệ	Technology
Giáo dục Quốc phòng-An ninh	National Defense and Security Training
Giáo dục thể chất (Thể dục)	Physical Education / Gymnastics
Giáo dục Kinh Tế và Pháp Luật	Economics and Laws Education
Giáo dục Địa Phương	Local Studies
Hoạt Động Trải Nghiệm và Hướng Nghiệp	Life Skills and Vocational Guidance
Điểm trung bình các môn học (ĐTBCM)	Total Average Marks/ GPA
