= Academic grading in Ukraine =

The current system of academic grading in Ukraine is in use since 2000.

The Ukrainian system for middle and high school provides grades that lie within 1 and 12. The lowest passing grade is 4. Additionally, the grades are divided into four levels: initial (1–3), sufficient (4–6), average (7–9) and high (10–12).

12 being an equivalent of exceptional, is always given only for significant achievements or exceptionally creative work, hence 11 is the grade that would be called the highest grade in many other countries, i.e. "A" in the United States, while 12 would be "A+".

Grade	Level		Oral analogue
Grade	Ukrainian	English	Oral analogue
12	Високий (В)	High	Exceptional
11	Високий (В)	High	Excellent
10	Високий (В)	High	Almost excellent
9	Середній (С)	Average	Very good
8	Середній (С)	Average	Good
7	Середній (С)	Average	Fairly good
6	Достатній (Д)	Sufficient	Above satisfactory
5	Достатній (Д)	Sufficient	Satisfactory
4	Достатній (Д)	Sufficient	Adequate
3	Початковий (П)	Initial	Almost adequate
2	Початковий (П)	Initial	Poor
1	Початковий (П)	Initial	Very poor
