= Academic grading in Portugal =

In Portuguese middle-schools, a five-point grading scale is used, where:

- 5 (very good or excellent) is the best possible grade (90-100%),
- 4 (good) (70-89%),
- 3 (satisfactory) indicates "average" performance (50-69%),
- 2 (unsatisfactory) (20-49%),
- 1 (poor) is the lowest possible grade (0-19%).

In high-schools and universities, a 20-point grading scale is used. When it is the case of the final grade of an academic degree, each grade is assigned a qualitative mark by degree (depending on the university, the students have at most a final grade of 16 or 17, being almost impossible for students to have a final score between 18 and 20):

Grade	Qualification
20 ⋮ 17.5	Excellent
17.4 ⋮ 15.5	Very good
15.4 ⋮ 13.5	Good
13.4 ⋮ 9.5	Sufficient
9.4 ⋮ 3.5	Weak
3.4 ⋮ 0	Poor
