= Academic grading in Finland =

This is an article on the grading that is used in Finland. Several systems are in use in different educational institutions in Finland.

== Comprehensive school ==
The "school grade" system has, historically, been a scale of 0 to 10, but all grades lower than 4 have been consolidated into a grade of 4. Thus, it is now divided between a failing grade (4), and 5–10, the passing grades. This is similar to the Romanian grading scale.

- 10 – Excellent, represents about the top 5%
- 9 – Very good
- 8 – Good
- 7 – Satisfactory (average)
- 6 – Fair
- 5 – Passable
- 4 – Failure

In individual exams, but not in the final grades, it is also possible to divide this scale further with '½', which represents a half grade, and '+' and '–', which represent quarter-grades. For example, the order is "9 < 9+ < 9½ < 10– < 10". The grade '10+' can also be awarded for a perfect performance with extra effort by the student, though it is not an official grade.

== Upper secondary schools ==
Upper secondary schools use the same grades for courses and course exams as comprehensive schools do, but the matriculation examination grades are in Latin. The grading system uses bell curve grading.

Matriculation examination grades
Grade	Abbr.	Points	English explanation	Literal translation	Percentage of participants
laudatur	L	7	outstanding	lauded (praised)	Top 5%
eximia cum laude approbatur	E	6	excellent	approved with exceptional praise	15%
magna cum laude approbatur	M	5	very good	approved with great praise	20%
cum laude approbatur	C	4	good	approved with praise	24%
lubenter approbatur	B	3	satisfactory	gladly approved	20%
approbatur	A	2	pass	approved	11%
improbatur	I	0	fail/unsatisfactory	not approved	bottom 5%

The magna cum laude approbatur grade was introduced in 1970 and eximia cum laude approbatur in 1996. Laudatur grades achieved before 1996 are now counted as eximia cum laude approbaturs.

== Higher education ==
Universities typically use grading scale from 0 to 5:

Finnish grade	English explanation	US equivalent	German equivalent	Dutch Equivalent	Greek Equivalent
5	excellent	A	1.0	8.5-10	10
4	very good	B+	1.7	8-8.5	9
3	good	B−	2.3	7-8	8
2	satisfactory	C−	3.0	6-7	7
1	pass	D	3.7	5.5-6	6
0	fail / insufficient	F	5.0	fail / insufficient	< 5

As a rule of thumb, passing an examination requires obtaining 50% of the maximum points in the examination. There is almost no grade inflation in Finland and students' grade averages of over 4.0 are rare. In fact, it is not uncommon for an examination to be failed—or passed with grade 1—by most students.

Before Autumn 2005, grades from 0–3 were in use (0 = failed, 3 = very good/excellent) and can be seen in older certificates. Some courses have also been graded on a conditional system of either pass or fail.

Master's theses are typically graded with either the above scale, or by the Latin system used in high school matriculation exams, see above. In the grading of Master Theses, there is also non sine laude (N) between lubenter (B) and cum laude (C). In the 19th century, grade admittitur "admitted" was used as the lowest passing grade, below approbatur. Contrary to the upper secondary school however, the grade laudatur is typically used very rarely (significantly less than 5% of theses). Indeed, laudatur is often reserved for exceptional students and it is typically awarded for a thesis only once in 5 to 10 years. In practice, eximia is often considered as the best grade available and it best corresponds to a grade of 5 in the 0–5 scale. Some universities (e.g. University of Turku or University of Helsinki) have switched to grading Master's Theses using the 1–5 grading scale (see below).

Doctoral theses are usually evaluated by pass or fail, although some universities use the Latin system, or the scale from 0 to 5. Some universities award a grade of "pass with distinction" (kiittäen hyväksytty) for the top 10–15% of theses awarded.
