= Indian Institutes of Engineering Science and Technology =

Proposed group of academic institutions

Indian Institutes of Engineering Science and Technology (abbreviated as IIEST) was a planned group of academic institutions in India for research and education in engineering, originally proposed by the Government of India in 2007 to meet the increasing demand for technological and scientific workforce in the industrial and service sectors of India as well as the growing need for qualified personnel in research and development.

== Conversion of BE College to IIEST ==
The first institute to be upgraded to IIEST was Bengal Engineering and Science University, Shibpur (BESU), which was a university under the Government of West Bengal prior to the upgrade process. It took some years for the Government of India to finally decide to go ahead with the process recommended by the Anandakrishnan Committee for upgrading the selected group of state universities to the nation level under the IIEST banner. It was thus in October 2010, that the Union Cabinet of Ministers of the Government of India formally approved the process of conversion of Bengal Engineering and Science University, Shibpur to Indian Institute of Engineering Science and Technology, Shibpur, by suitably amending the National Institutes of Technology and Science Education and Research Act, 2007. Accordingly, the amendment bill was tabled in the lower house (Lok Sabha) of the Parliament of India in March 2013 and subsequently passed by it in December 2013. Following this, the bill was also passed in the upper house (Rajya Sabha) in February 2014. The bill received the presidential assent by President of India Pranab Mukherjee on 4 March 2014, thereby legalizing the upgrade process. —In exercise of the powers conferred by sub-section (2) of Section 1 of the NITSER(Amendment) Act, 2014, the Central Government appointed the 4th day of March, 2014 (i.e. date of receiving assent of the President) as the date on which the provisions of the said Act shall come into force. That is BESU has become the first IIEST of the country with effect from 4 March 2014. The conversion process of BESU to IIEST shall be mentored by IIT Kanpur.

IIEST was inaugurated by President of India, Pranab Mukherjee on 24 August 2014.
