= Academic grading in the Czech Republic =

This article introduces the academic grading systems in the Czech Republic.

== Primary and secondary ==
In the Czech Republic, primary and secondary schools use a 5-point grade system, with 1 as the best and 5 as the worst. They correspond to the following ratings: 1 = výborně (excellent), 2 = chvalitebně (commendable), 3 = dobře (good), 4 = dostatečně (sufficient), and 5 = nedostatečně (insufficient). Only whole numbers appear on report cards, but tests or oral exams are often marked with additional distinctive signs: 3+ is slightly better than 3, 2− is slightly lower than 2, 1-2 or 1/2 means halfway between 1 and 2, and 1* means exceptionally excellent.

Private high schools or Gymnasiums may use different academic grading. A 10-point grading scale consisting of 1 (A), 2 (A−), 3 (B+) ... 10 (D) has been used in some private schools in the Czech Republic.

== Tertiary ==
Most universities use a 4-point grade system, in which 1 is the highest and 4 indicates failing. They might also use the textual form of the grades in addition to the numerical form: 1 = výborně (excellent), 2 = velmi dobře (very good), 3 = dobře (good), 4 = neprospěl (fail). In recent years, many universities adopted ECTS system, with the grades A to F. It maps to the previous classification in the following way:

ECTS classification	Czech classification	Orientation percentage
A	1	90 - 100
B	1.5	80 - 89
C	2	70 - 79
D	2.5	60 - 69
E	3	50 - 59
F	4	0 - 49

Some Czech universities, such as University of Economics, Prague, map points acquired throughout the course (out of 100 acquirable) using a different ratio:

Textual classification	Numeric classification	Points acquired
excellent	1	90 - 100
very good	2	75 - 89
good	3	60 - 74
(see below)	4	50 - 59
fail	5	0 - 49

4+, or 50 - 59 points, may enable the students retake an exam to try to get above the 60 points cutoff. If the student fails to do so, it gets changed to 4 (fail) automatically at the end of the semester. First day of the next semester the grades from each subject (where points were inserted into the system) also get converted to the ECTS scale for international use like this:

ECTS classification	Portion of students
A	q10 - top 10% successful students
B	q35 - next 25% successful students
C	q65 - next 30% successful students
D	q90 - next 25% successful students
E	q100 - last 10% successful students
F	students graded 5 (fail)
