= Academic grading in Hungary =

In Hungary, a 5-point grade system is used in primary, secondary and higher education, which categorically evaluates the academic performance, behaviour and diligence of the student. The categories may be signaled via number or name. A singular grade is called osztályzat or érdemjegy (meaning: "merit mark"), or colloquially jegy (meaning: "mark").

The grading is regulated by Act CXC. of 2011 on National Public Education. According to regulation, the performance is assessed and evaluated by the teacher, behaviour and diligence is evaluated by the homeroom teacher or form teacher, the midterm and final grades are calculated from the grades throughout the year, and the grades must not be used as disciplinary tools.

== Primary and secondary education ==
In the first year of primary school, only text based evaluation is given, not grades. After the first year, midterm and final grades are given, calculated from the grades throughout the year.

There are only whole numbers in report cards, but for grading exams, there are also fractions (such as 3/4, which is between 3 and 4). Some teachers use lines above (rarely) or under (more commonly) the numbers to draw a clearer distinction: e.g., 4- is worse than a 4 but better than a 3, a 3' (3-plus), or a 3/4 (3 < 3' < 3/4 < 4, < 4); sometimes they even use multiple lines.

For unusually good performance, the grade 5* can be awarded, but is less frequently used in secondary schools. 1 is the only failing grade. When grading a student's behaviour/conduct or diligence/effort, only the grades 2-5 are used.

Academic grading in primary and secondary education in Hungary
Grade	Academic performance	Behaviour/Conduct	Diligence/Effort
5	jeles, Excellent	példás, Exemplary	példás, Exemplary
4	jó, Good	jó, Good	jó, Good
3	közepes, Satisfactory	változó, Variable	változó, Variable
2	elégséges, Sufficient	rossz, Bad	hanyag, Negligent
1	elégtelen, Insufficient	–	–

== Higher education ==
In higher education, college and university, the behaviour and diligence are not graded, only academic performance. The basis of grading can be various assignments throughout the year, progress tests or midterm tests (zárthelyi dolgozat, ZH; meaning: "closed venue test", as they are usually written in person), and exams taking place at the end of the semester.

Academic grading in higher education in Hungary
Grade	Academic performance	Score in percentage
5	jeles, Excellent	90%-100%
4	jó, Good	80%-89%
3	közepes, Satisfactory	70%-79%
2	elégséges, Sufficient	60%-69%
1	elégtelen, Insufficient	59% or below
