= Academic grading in Switzerland =

In Switzerland, the 6-point grading scale is usually applied, where 1 represents the lowest possible grade, and 6 represents the highest possible grade.

- 6 (Excellent; best possible grade; exceptional performance, 94% US system)
- 5.5 (Very good, 90% US system)
- 5 (Good, 86% US system)
- 4.5 (Satisfactory, 82% US system)
- 4 (Sufficient, 78% US system)
- 3.5 (Insufficient,74% US system)
- 3 (Poor, 70% US system)
- 2.5 and under (Very poor, 66% US system)

Grade averages between 5.5 and 6 are very hard to get (US Grade A/UK First Class/France 16.0/German 1.5 equivalent). An average of 6 is nearly impossible.

== Exams ==
Quarter steps are usually used in exams to indicate grades between integer grades: e.g., 5.25. Sometimes, finer grained systems are used with steps of one-tenth. This is often the case in exams in which the grade is a linear function of the number of achieved points: Grade = (achieved points)/(max points) × 5 + 1.

== Certificates ==
Certificate grades are either rounded to integers or half-integers. After having rounded the individual grades, a weighted mean is used to calculate the overall result. The weight of a grade is normally proportional to the number of hours the according subject was taught per week. To pass a year, this overall result needs to be sufficient. Sometimes further conditions need to be fulfilled, such as a maximum allowed number of grades below four. At university level, classes can often be repeated individually in case of an insufficient grade, so not the whole year or semester needs to be repeated.

In a typical exam, the average result will be somewhat above 4 with a variance between 0.5 and 1. This of course varies depending on the kind of exam, the tested class, the school level, the region, the teacher and other factors.

== Cantonal differences ==
Since education is in the responsibility of the cantons (except for the federal universities), grading notations may differ depending on the region. In some regions, + and − are used to indicate marks below or above an integer. Sometimes the − is used to indicate a better grade if it stands after the grade and a lower grade if it stands before the grade (in which case − is a symbol for "bis", e.g. 'to', rather than 'minus'), for example −5 (4.75) is lower than 5 which is lower than 5− (5.25) in that system. In some regions, decimal grades are used: 5.5, 4.5, etc.

== Universities ==
At university level, in some cases, Latin expressions are used. The Latin grades for a passed final exam in law at the University of Zurich, for example, are "summa cum laude" (excellent), "magna cum laude" (very good), "cum laude" (good) and "rite" (sufficient).
