= Diplôme national du brevet =

French diploma at the end of ninth grade

The Diplôme national du brevet is a diploma given to French pupils at the end of 3^{e} (year 10 / ninth grade). It is sometime called brevet des collèges (in French, "collège" means junior high school). This diploma is awarded to students who are or were within French cultural influence, including France itself, Morocco, Tunisia, Lebanon, Syria and Algeria, the first two having been French protectorates, while the middle two were under French Mandate for a period after World War I and Algeria was a French territory from 1830 until its independence in 1962. Pupils outside of France who study in French schools belonging to the Agency for French Teaching Abroad network also sit this exam.

== Requirements ==
To be awarded a diploma, pupils must attain an annual average of 10 out of 20. This average is calculated from regular continuous assessments in class during the year of 3^{e}, which make up 40% of the average, and the final examinations usually held in June which make up 60% of the average. This has been put in place since the 2026 Session.

Previously, students must have acquired the seven key competencies of the "Common Core of Knowledge and Skills" and scored a minimum of 400 points (out of 800). These points were awarded via tests in each subject except in history-geography-civics (continuous assessment: contrôle continu) and in a final exam at the end of 3^{e}.

Also starting from 2008, pupils must acquire the A2 level of the Common European Framework of Reference for Languages in a foreign language (English, German, Spanish, Italian...). In other countries, primarily the UK, United States, Canada, and several ex-Yugoslav and Asian countries, the equivalent period covered by the diploma is middle school.

== Continuous assessment ==
Over the course of the ninth grade, at the end of each unit of a course, all pupils take a test graded out of twenty points. At the end of each trimester the average mark from each subject is calculated as well as a general average (the average of all the subjects' averages).

Up until 2007, the averages from the two school years (six trimesters) from the start of the quatrième (eighth grade) to the end of the ninth grade were counted towards the final result. From 2007 onwards, only the marks from the ninth grade are used. A pupil may know they have a good enough average to pass the Brevet before sitting for the exams. However, students may not skip the exams as that would mean automatic disqualification.

== Final exam ==
At the end of the ninth grade, four tests are taken, such that each will have a score of:
French Literature and Language: 100
History - Geography and Moral and Civic Education : 50
Mathematics: 100
Physics - Chemistry, Life and Earth Sciences and Technology (any 2 of the 3): 50

And as of 2011, an oral exam in cultural history, since replaced by the presentation of a school or work experience is mandatory for all students in the ninth grade. It is taken before the three other tests. It consists of writing an essay (around 2000 words) about any art form and analyzing 6 to 8 paintings, then presenting them to two teachers for 10–15 minutes then answering questions that they ask. This also has a score out of 100.

== Calculation ==
The results are calculated using a weighted total. The subjects of the final exams are weighted as follows:

- French: 2
- Mathematics: 2
- History, Geography and Civics: 2
- Physics, Chemistry and Biology: 2

The subjects studied in the ninth grade are given a total weighting of 9 to 11, depending on the série taken. In order to pass the Brevet, the pupil must score on average the equivalent of 10 out of 20. A higher score may result in the award of a "mention":

- 18-20: Mention très bien avec félicitations du jury (with highest honors and congratulations from the jury) (Starting on the session of 2025)
- 16–17.9: Mention très bien: TB (with highest honors)
- 14–15.9: bien: B (high honors)
- 12–13.9: assez bien: AB (honors)
