= Academic grading in France =

Academic grading in France is structured and rigorous, with a focus on assessment through written exams and a set of standardized scales for measuring student achievement.

Since 1890, the French baccalauréat exam, required to receive a high school diploma, has traditionally scored students on a scale (Barème) of 0–20, as do most secondary school and university classes. Although the traditional scale stops at 20/20, French baccalauréat results can be higher than 20/20 due to supplementary "options". French universities traditionally grade in a stricter way than secondary schools, which means that students are unlikely to receive marks as high as they did in secondary school. Famously, in Preparatory Class for 'Grandes Écoles' (CPGE), an optional 2-4 year preparation for the most elite universities in France, students are graded so harshly that class ranking, rather than individual grades, usually reflects an individual's performance, especially when comparing the grades to secondary or university grades. Often, an average grade of 7–8 in Preparatory Class for 'Grandes Écoles' (CPGE) can be considered as a satisfactory grade if the best grade in the class is only a 12.

On the diplôme national du brevet, awarded for passing the 10th year exam (9th grade), and also on University of Paris, Sorbonne transcripts, scores above 12 on the scale of 20 confer the following mentions (honors):

- 16–20: Mention très bien: TB
- 14–15.9: Tres bien: B
- 12–13.9: Assez bien: AB

== Other scales in French schools ==
In recent years, the French government began to explore possible conversion of the 0–20 grading scale to 0–4 or 0–5. Since 2008, the College Gabriel-Séailles, a middle school in southern France, has abolished grading altogether.

Primary schools generally use a 10-point grading scale or a letter grade.

The European Credit Transfer and Accumulation System (ECTS) scale is gaining popularity in the post-secondary education system, since it is the standard for comparing study performance throughout the European Union. The GPA grading scale is becoming more and more common as well since it eases the comparison with American students.

Some Grandes écoles use "exotic" systems, such as Ecole Centrale de Lille, which uses a three-letter scale system:

- A: Excellent (acquis)
- S: Satisfactory (satisfaisant)
- I: Fail (insuffisant)

== History ==
In 12th Century Europe, students were evaluated by oral disputation in Latin. In the 14th century, some written examinations occurred, but were rare. By the 16th century the Catholic Church was struggling against the Protestant Reformation, and trying to advance Catholic scholarship as a defense of doctrine, to which end The Society of Jesus was created, and with it Jesuit Colleges. One of which, the Collegio Romano, published the Ratio Studiorum in 1599, a book of rules for Jesuit education in which official procedures for examinations, competitions, and homework were outlined along with a method for ranking and classifying students. During the Ancien Régime in France (15th–18th Centuries), oral examination was still the most common method of evaluating students. In 1558, a school in Portugal was the first European school to distribute prizes to the best students, and by the end of the century other schools were following suit. By the end of the 18th century, schools in France were beginning to publish bulletins with student evaluations and class rankings and the Jesuite College at Caen would develop a numerical 4 point ranking ("4 niveaux: 1 = bien; 2 = assez bien; 3 = médiocre; 0 = mal"). Even in the early years of the Baccalauréat (created in 1808), the oral evaluation committee members expressed their appraisal of candidates with colored balls (Red for "favorable", white for "abstention", black for "unfavorable"). In the Second French Empire, the representation of colored balls was converted into a numerical system of 0–5, and then in 1890 the numerical system of 0-20 was created along with the modern French baccalauréat, which comprises several stages of written examinations
In the student rebellions of, 1968, the bulletin of January 6, 1969 recommended a change from the 0-20 grading scale to a qualitative evaluation such as "very satisfactory", "unsatisfactory", etc., Or adopting a more general (A, B, C, D, E) letter system, or a simplified numerical system (1,2,3,4,5). Before the change could be fully implemented, the recommendation was reversed in a bulletin on July 9, 1971, which recommended the continuation of the 0-20 system.

== Comparison with American grades ==
There is no exact formula for converting scores between the French 0–20 scale and American grades, and there are several reasons why the systems are not entirely commensurate. For instance, some American institutions use rank based grading and grading curves, that is, shifting the grades of a class so that the highest scores align with the highest grades on the grading scale and the lowest scores align with the lowest grades on the scale or aligning the median achieved score within the class to a fixed point on the grading scale. Likewise some American institutions use weighted grades, wherein grades for advanced classes are augmented in the official transcripts to compensate for the difficulty of the classes. French schools use neither, the result being that in a university, a 20 is almost never awarded. Grades over 14 are extremely rare, and scores over 12 indicate that the student is in the top 10–20% of the class. About half of all French Law School students at Paris Sorbonne I maintain an average of 10–12, while the median grade at Cornell Law School is 3.35 (B+), at Duke University School of Law is 3.30 (B+), at UC Davis School of Law is 3.25–3.35 (B/B+), and at Columbia Law School the median GPA is estimated at 3.4 (B+).

Even though no exact conversion exists between the two systems, there are several scales that approximate a conversion and many American universities require that grades from foreign institutions, such as grades in the French 20 point scale, be converted into the American system on applications. While other sources suggest that students should not make their own calculations directly for the application.

Table of various conversion scales for university level classes:

| French Grade | World Education Services Scale | CampusFrance Scale | University of Minnesota Scale | l’École Nationale Supérieure de Géologie Scale |
|---|---|---|---|---|
| 18–20 | A | A+ | A | 4 (A+/A) |
| 17–17.9 | A | A+ | A | 4 (A+/A) |
| 16–16.9 | A | A+ (A >2024) | A | 3.7 (A−) |
| 15–15.9 | A | A | A | 3.7 (A−) |
| 14–14.9 | A | A (B >2024) | A− | 3.5 (B+) |
| 13–13.9 | B+ | B | B+ | 3.2 (B) |
| 12–12.9 | B+ | B | B+ | 3.0 (B) |
| 11–11.9 | B | C | B | 2.7 (B−) |
| 10.5–10.9 | B− | C | B− | 2.7 (B−) |
| 10.1–10.4 | C+ | C | B− | 2.7 (B−) |
| 10 | C | C | B− | 2.7 (B−) |
| 9–9.9 | C− | D | C+ | 2.5 (C+) |
| 8–8.9 | D | D | C | 2.5 (C+) |
| 7–7.9 | F | F | C− | 2.2 (C) |
| 6–6.9 | F | F | D+ | 2.2 (C) |
| 5–5.9 | F | F | D | 2.2 (C) |
| 4–4.9 | F | F | F | 2.2 (C) |
| 1–3.9 | F | F | F | 2.0 (C) |
| 0–0.9 | F | F | F | 2.0 (C) |

Table of various conversion scales for secondary school classes:

| French Grade | Lycée Rochambeau Scale | Lycée Rochambeau Scale | French Consulate (Miami) Scale | Fulbright Scale | Lycée Rochambeau Scale | Lycée Rochambeau Scale | French Consulate (Miami) Scale | Fulbright Scale |
|---|---|---|---|---|---|---|---|---|
| | Grades 11–13; Honors Classes | Grades 11–13; Non-Honors Classes | Grades 10–12 | Grades 10–12 | Grades 9–10; Honors Classes | Grades 9–10; Non-Honors Classes | Grades 6–9 | Grades 6–9 |
| 17–20 | A+ | A+ | A+ | A+ | A+ | A+ | A+ | A+ |
| 16–16.9 | A+ | A+ | A+ | A+ | A+ | A+ | A | A+ |
| 15.5–15.9 | A+ | A+ | A+ | A+ | A+ | A | A | A |
| 15–15.4 | A+ | A+ | A | A+ | A+ | A | A | A |
| 14–14.9 | A+ | A | A | A | A | A− | A− | A– |
| 13.5–13.9 | A | A− | A | A− | A− | B+ | B+ | B+ |
| 13–13.4 | A | A− | A− | A− | A− | B+ | B+ | B+ |
| 12–12.9 | A− | B+ | A− | B+ | B+ | B | B | B |
| 11–11.9 | B+ | B | B+ | B | B | B− | B− | B– |
| 10.5–10.9 | B | B− | B | B− | B− | C+ | B− | C+ |
| 10–10.4 | B | B− | B | B− | B− | C+ | C+ | C+ |
| 9.5–9.9 | B− | C+ | B− | C+ | C+ | C | C+ | C |
| 9–9.4 | B− | C+ | B− | C+ | C+ | C | C | C |
| 8.5–8.9 | C+ | C | C+ | C | C | C− | C | C– |
| 8–8.4 | C+ | C | C | C | C | C− | C− | C– |
| 7.5–7.9 | C | C− | C | C− | C− | D+ | C− | D+ |
| 7–7.4 | C | C− | C− | C− | C− | D+ | D+ | D+ |
| 6.5–6.9 | C− | D+ | D+ | D+ | D+ | D | D | D |
| 6–6.4 | C− | D+ | D | D+ | D+ | D | D− | D |
| 5.5–5.9 | D+ | D | D− | D | D | D− | F | D– |
| 5–5.4 | D+ | D | F | D | D | D− | F | D– |
| 4–4.9 | D | D− | F | D− | D− | F | F | F |
| 0–3.9 | D− | F | F | F | F | F | F | F |

== The UK Honours degree system compared to grades in France ==
King's College London gives equivalencies between French and British grades for postgraduate admission, as does the University of St Andrews for its study-abroad programme. Equivalencies for the purposes of initial teacher training have also been derived by the UK NARIC for 1st, 2:1 and 2:2 degrees.

| British class | French grade range | | |
| British class | King's College London | St Andrews | UK NARIC |
|---|---|---|---|
| First | 14+ (Très bien; Bien) | 15–20 (Très bien; upper Bien) | 16+ (Très bien) |
| Upper Second | 12–13.99 (Assez bien) | 12–14.99 (lower Bien; Assez bien) | 13+ (Bien; upper Assez bien) |
| Lower Second | 11–11.99 (upper Passable) | 10–11.99 (Passable) | 12+ (lower Assez bien) |
| Third | – | 7–9.99 (Echec/ajourné) | – |
| Pass | – | 6–6.99 (Echec/ajourné) | – |

== Honors terminology compared to American and Latin Honors ==
French diplomas grant "Mentions" similar to American "Honors" or "Latin Honors" titles

| French "Mention" | Latin Honor | American Honor |
|---|---|---|
| "Mention Très Bien (avec ou sans félicitations du jury)" | "summa cum laude" | "Highest Honors" |
| "Mention Bien" | "magna cum laude" | "High Honors" |
| "Mention Assez Bien" | "cum laude" | "With Honors" |
