= List of high schools in Croatia =

This is the list of schools which provide secondary education in Croatia.

== List of schools by county ==
=== Zagreb County ===
- Air Force Technical School Rudolf Perešin, Velika Gorica
- Art School Franjo Lučić, Velika Gorica
- Economic School Velika Gorica, Velika Gorica
- Economic, Trade and Catering School Andrije Hebranga, Samobor
- Gymnasium "Antun Gustav Matoš" Samobor, Samobor
- Gymnasium Velika Gorica, Velika Gorica
- High School Ban Josip Jelačić, Zaprešić
- High School Dragutin Stražimir, Sveti Ivan Zelina
- High School Vrbovec, Vrbovec
- Music School "Ferdo Livadić", Samobor
- Secondary School Dugo Selo, Dugo Selo
- Secondary School "Ivan Švear" Ivanić Grad, Ivanić Grad
- Secondary School Jastrebarsko, Jastrebarsko
- Vocational School Samobor, Samobor
- Vocation School Velika Gorica, Velika Gorica

=== Krapina-Zagorje County ===
- Gymnasium Antun Gustav Matoš Zabok, Zabok
- High School Bedekovčina, Bedekovčina
- High School Konjščina, Konjščina
- High School Krapina, Krapina
- High School Pregrada, Pregrada
- High School Zabok, Zabok
- High School Zlatar, Zlatar
- Music School Pregrada, Pregrada
- School of Arts, Design, Graphic and Apparel Zabok, Zabok

=== Varaždin County ===
- Agricultural and Veterinary School "Arboretum Opeka", Vinica
- Architectural, Natural Science and Mining school, Varaždin
- Economy School, Varaždin
- Electromechanical-Engineering School, Varaždin
- I. Gymnasium Varaždin, Varaždin
- First Private Gymnasium, Varaždin
- High School Ivanec, Ivanec
- High School Maruševec, Maruševec
- Private high school with public rights, Varaždin
- Private Varaždin Gymnasium Žiger, Varaždin
- II. Gymnasium Varaždin, Varaždin
- Mechanical engineering and transport school, Varaždin
- Medical School, Varaždin
- Music School in Varaždin, Varaždin
- Vocational School, Varaždin

=== Sisak-Moslavina County ===
- Economic School Sisak, Sisak
- Gymnasium Sisak, Sisak
- High School Glina, Glina
- High School Ivan Trnski, Hrvatska Kostajnica
- High School Novska, Novska
- High School Petrinja, Petrinja
- High School Tin Ujević Kutina, Kutina
- High School Topusko, Topusko
- High School Viktorovac, Sisak
- Industrial Trades School Sisak, Sisak
- Music School Fran Lhotka, Sisak
- Music School Novska, Novska
- Technical School Kutina, Kutina
- Technical School Sisak, Sisak
- Vocation School Sisak, Sisak

=== Koprivnica-Križevci County ===
- Gymnasium "Fran Galović" Koprivnica

=== Bjelovar-Bilogora County ===
- Economic and Office technical School Bjelovar, Bjelovar
- Economic and Tourism School Daruvar, Daruvar
- Gymnasium Bjelovar, Bjelovar
- Gymnasium Daruvar, Daruvar
- Music School "Bruno Bjelinski" Daruvar, Daruvar
- Music School "Vatroslav Lisinski" Bjelovar, Bjelovar
- Commercial and Trade School Bjelovar, Bjelovar
- Medical School Bjelovar, Bjelovar
- Craft School Bjelovar, Bjelovar
- High School "August Šenoa", Garešnica
- High School "Bartol Kašić", Grubišno Polje
- High School Čazma, Čazma
- Technical School Bjelovar, Bjelovar
- Technical School Daruvar, Daruvar
- Tourism, Catering and Food Sciences School Bjelovar, Bjelovar

=== Lika-Senj County ===
- High School Pavao Ritter Vitezović, Senj

=== Virovitica-Podravina County ===
- High School of Engineering
- Vocational School
- Catholic Classic Gymnasium, Virovitica
- Gymnasium Petar Preradović, Virovitica

=== Brod-Posavina County ===
- Economic and Office technical School, Slavonski Brod
- Electromechanical and Economic School, Nova Gradiška
- Gymnasium Matija Mesić, Slavonski Brod
- Gymnasium Nova Gradiška, Nova Gradiška
- Music School Slavonski Brod, Slavonski Brod
- Industrial and Craft School, Nova Gradiška
- Industrial and Craft School, Slavonski Brod
- Craft and Technical School, Slavonski Brod
- Medical High School, Slavonski Brod
- High school "Matija Antun Reljković", Slavonski Brod
- Technical School, Slavonski Brod
- Classical Gymnasium "fra Marijan Lanosović", Slavonski Brod

=== Osijek-Baranja County ===
- I Gymnasium Osijek
- II Gymnasium Osijek
- III Gymnasium Osijek
- Dalj High School
- Jesuit Classical Gymnasium in Osijek

=== Šibenik-Knin County ===
- Economic School Šibenik, Šibenik
- Gymnasium "Antun Vrančić", Šibenik
- Music School "Ivan Lukačić", Šibenik
- Industrial and Craft School Šibenik, Šibenik
- Medical School, Šibenik
- Technical and transport School Šibenik, Šibenik
- High School "Ivan Meštrović" Drniš, Drniš
- High School "Lovre Monti", Knin
- Vocational High School "King Zvonimir", Knin
- Vocational High School Šibenik, Šibenik
- Technical School, Šibenik
- Tourism and Catering School Šibenik, Šibenik

=== Vukovar-Syrmia County ===
- Agricultural Forestry School Vinkovci, Vinkovci
- Economic and Trade School Domac Ivan Vinkovci, Vinkovci
- Vinkovci Gymnasium, Vinkovci
- Vukovar Gymnasium, Vukovar
- Županja Gymnasium, Županja
- Health and Veterinary school Dr. Andrija Štampar Vinkovci, Vinkovci
- High School Ilok, Ilok
- School of Economics Vukovar, Vukovar
- School of Music Joseph Runjanin Vinkovci, Vinkovci
- Technical School of Nikola Tesla Vukovar, Vukovar
- Technical school Ruder Boskovic Vinkovci, Vinkovci
- Technical School Županja, Županja
- Vocational School Vinkovci, Vinkovci
- Vocational School Vukovar, Vukovar
- Wood-Technical Technical School Vinkovci, Vinkovci

=== Split-Dalmatia County ===
- Srednja strukovna škola Blaž Jurjev Trogiranin Trogir
- Srednja škola Ivana Lucića Trogir

=== Dubrovnik-Neretva County ===
- Biskupijska klasična gimznazija Ruđer Bošković - Dubrovnik
- Dubrovačka privatna gimnazija - Dubrovnik
- Ekonomska i trgovačka škola Dubrovnik- Dubrovnik
- Medicinska škola - Dubrovnik
- Obrtnička škola - Dubrovnik
- Gimnazija Metković - Metković
- Srednja škola Metković - Metković
- Srednja poljoprivredna i tehnička škola - Opuzen
- Srednja škola Blato - Korčula
- Srednja škola fra Andrije Kačića Miošića - Ploče
- Turistička i ugostiteljska škola - Dubrovnik
- Srednja škola Petra Šegedina - Korčula
- Srednjaškola - Vela Luka
- Umjetnička škola Luke Sorkočevića - Dubrovnik

=== Međimurje County ===
- Economy school Čakovec, Čakovec
- Gymnasium of Josip Slavenski Čakovec, Čakovec
- Economic and trading school Čakovec, Čakovec
- Construction school Čakovec, Čakovec
- High school Prelog, Prelog
- Technical school Čakovec, Čakovec
- High school Čakovec, Čakovec

== See also ==
- Education in Croatia
- List of institutions of higher education in Croatia
- List of schools in Croatia
