= Zdravko Marić =

Croatian economist and politician

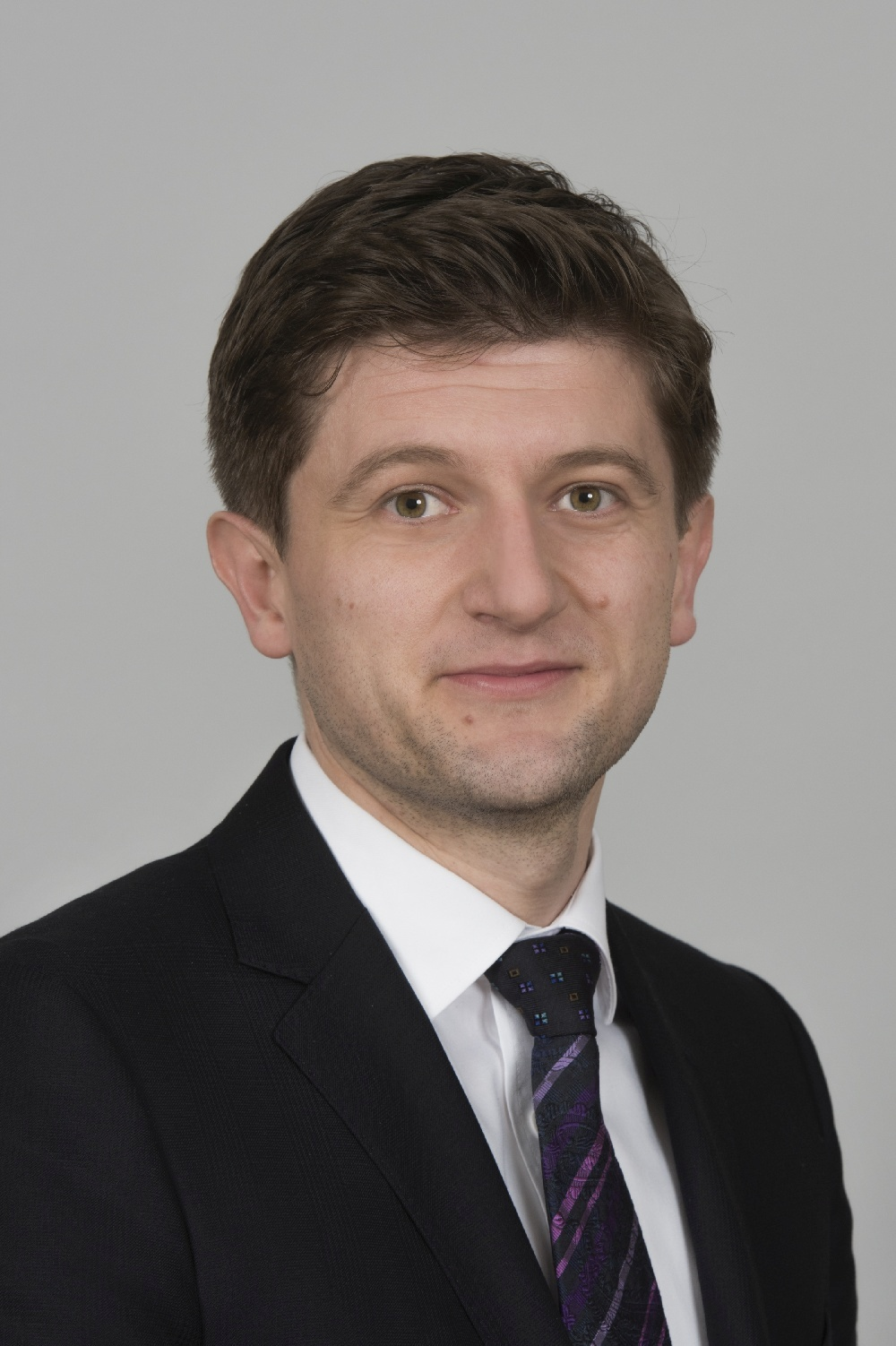
- Official portrait, 2016

Deputy Prime Minister of Croatia
- In office 19 July 2019 – 15 July 2022
- Prime Minister: Andrej Plenković
- Preceded by: Tomislav Tolušić
- Succeeded by: Oleg Butković

Minister of Finance
- In office 22 January 2016 – 15 July 2022
- Prime Minister: Tihomir Orešković; Andrej Plenković
- Preceded by: Boris Lalovac
- Succeeded by: Marko Primorac

Personal details
- Born: 3 February 1977 (age 49) Slavonski Brod, SR Croatia, SFR Yugoslavia
- Party: Independent
- Spouse: Nataša Marić
- Children: 2
- Education: University of Zagreb; Harvard Kennedy School

Zdravko Marić (Croatian pronunciation: [zdrǎːʋko mǎːrit͜ɕ]; born 3 February 1977) is a Croatian economist and politician who served as the Minister of Finance from 2016 and a Deputy Prime Minister from 2019, until his resignation from both positions in 2022. He was the first non-partisan holder of the office in Croatia's post-independent history.

He assumed the position of finance minister in the cabinet of Tihomir Orešković, and continued to hold the position in the first and the second cabinet of Andrej Plenković.

== Early life and education ==
Zdravko Marić was born on 3 February 1977 in Slavonski Brod. After finishing elementary and high school in his hometown, he enrolled in Zagreb Faculty of Economics and Business from which he graduated finances in 2000. He obtained his master's degree in operational research in 2004 with thesis Analysis of Capital Flows in Transition Countries Through the Impact on Investment. In 2007, Marić attended the executive education program in Management at Young Global Leaders School of Klaus Schwab at the Harvard University. Marić earned his Ph.D. in 2008 from the Zagreb Faculty of Economics and Business with thesis The Impact of Foreign Direct Investments on the Productivity of Croatian Companies.

== Career ==
Zdravko Marić gained his first working experience as an assistant at the Zagreb Institute of Economics where he worked from 2001 to 2006 on a number of scientific and commercial projects. During this period, he also worked as occasional lecturer at the Zagreb School of Economics and Management and the International Graduate Business School Zagreb. In 2006, he became Assistant for Macroeconomic Analysis and Planning to finance minister Ivan Šuker (HDZ). His main responsibility was to bring macroeconomic forecasting and work on the state budget, as well as direct cooperation with the European Commission in the field of economic dialogue. In 2008, Marić was promoted to the position of state secretary which gave him additional responsibilities, including the overall state budget, the financial system and cooperation with international financial institutions (IMF, WB, IADB, EBRD, EIB, CEB). In addition, he became the leader of the working group for the Croatian negotiation process with the European Union for Chapter 33: Budget and Financial Regulations. After HDZ lost 2011 parliamentary election, Slavko Linić from the SDP was appointed finance minister, and although he offered Marić the opportunity to stay on as state secretary, Marić refused and got a job in the largest Croatian retail joint-stock company Agrokor where he worked as Executive Director for Strategy and Capital. His responsibilities were international finances, relations with investors and mergers and acquisitions. When HDZ managed to form coalition Government with Bridge of Independent Lists (MOST) after the 2015 parliamentary election, Marić was appointed Minister of Finance instead of Ivan Šuker whose appointment was opposed by MOST, although MOST initially opposed Marić's appointment as well. According to a poll conducted in April 2016 by IPSOS Puls for Nova TV, Marić was considered the second most popular member of the Government after Prime Minister Tihomir Orešković.

On 10 June 2016 in light of the government crisis caused by a call for a motion of no confidence against First Deputy Prime Minister Tomislav Karamarko due to his conflict of interest in an affair involving his wife Ana Šarić and Josip Petrović, special adviser and lobbyist of the MOL Group, a Hungarian oil corporation that gained control of Croatia's national oil company INA through a corruption scandal, and the ensuing calls for Prime Minister Orešković to resign, HDZ planned to nominate Marić as their candidate for Prime Minister to replace Orešković. However, since it was clear that Marić would not get the support of a majority of MPs, the idea was abandoned, which led to the dissolution of the Croatian Parliament and new elections.

Following the 2016 extraordinary parliamentary election and the creation of Andrea Plenkovič' cabinet, Marić continued to serve as Minister of Finance. On 20 April 2017, 46 MPs from the SDP, HNS, HSS, HSU, ŽZ and SNAGA backed by the 15 MPs from MOST, submitted a proposal for a motion of no confidence against Marić after the Committee on Conflict of Interest concluded that Marić, who served as an Executive Director for Strategy and Capital in Agrokor prior to taking office as a minister, participated in the Government session held on 10 April 2017 where the Government was deciding on the proposal for appointing the extraordinary manager in the Agrokor by which Marić violated provisions of the Law on Prevention of Conflicts of Interest which stipulates that a state official has to exempt himself from all proceedings which could directly or indirectly affect a company in which he worked prior to taking office. In addition, MPs stated that Marić, at a time when Agrokor's financial statements were tampered with, had the task of presenting those statements to third parties and their active usage in order to secure Agrokor's stable financing, as well as that Marić, upon taking office as finance minister, postponed regulations that might reveal the existence of a crisis in Agrokor. (Note: Note:In January 2017, Moody's lowered Agrokor's rating from B2 to B3 and in the same time increased the possibility of companies' bankruptcy, and later lowered Agrokor's rating four more times by June. Agrokor's bonds started losing value. In February 2017, Moody's reduced the prospects for Agrokor's rating from stable to negative. In April 2017, the government passed an emergency law, nicknamed Lex Agrokor, that allowed the state to appoint an executive with a special crisis management team to steer a restructuring of companies in financial troubles with more than 5,000 employees. On 7 April, Agrokor's management filed a request for the activation of Lex Agrokor after which the Government appointed Ivica Ramljak as Agrokor's extraordinary manager. He started negotiating with banks and suppliers in order to rescue the company from bankruptcy. On 9 October, Ramljak announced a consolidated report which reduced Agrokor's value for 21 billion HRK, revealing that he filed a criminal charges against Todorić and his associates for tempering companies' financial statements. Afterwards, USKOK launched a criminal prosecution against 13 members of the governing and supervisory boards Agrokor's including the owner Ivica Todorić himself.) On 4 May 2017, the Parliament voted against him failed in a tie vote, so Marić remained in office. Following the vote, Speaker Božo Petrov stated that the vote showed that the HDZ no longer had a majority in the parliament and that the only right thing to do would be to call new election. However, Petrov resigned his position citing "moral obligation", MOST left the Government and moved to the opposition, and HNS started supporting the government.

== Other activities ==
- European Bank for Reconstruction and Development (EBRD), Ex-Officio Member of the Board of Governors (2019–2022)
- European Investment Bank (EIB), Ex-Officio Member of the Board of Governors (2019–2022)
- Inter-American Investment Corporation (IIC), Ex-Officio Member of the Board of Governors (2019–2022)
- Multilateral Investment Guarantee Agency (MIGA), World Bank Group, Ex-Officio Member of the Board of Governors (2019–2022)
- World Bank, Ex-Officio Member of the Board of Governors (2019–2022)

== Personal life ==
Marić is married and has two children. He speaks Croatian, English, and Italian fluently.

== Notes ==
Political offices
Preceded by Boris Lalovac	Minister of Finance; 2016–present	Incumbent
