= Boris Lalovac =

Croatian politician and economist

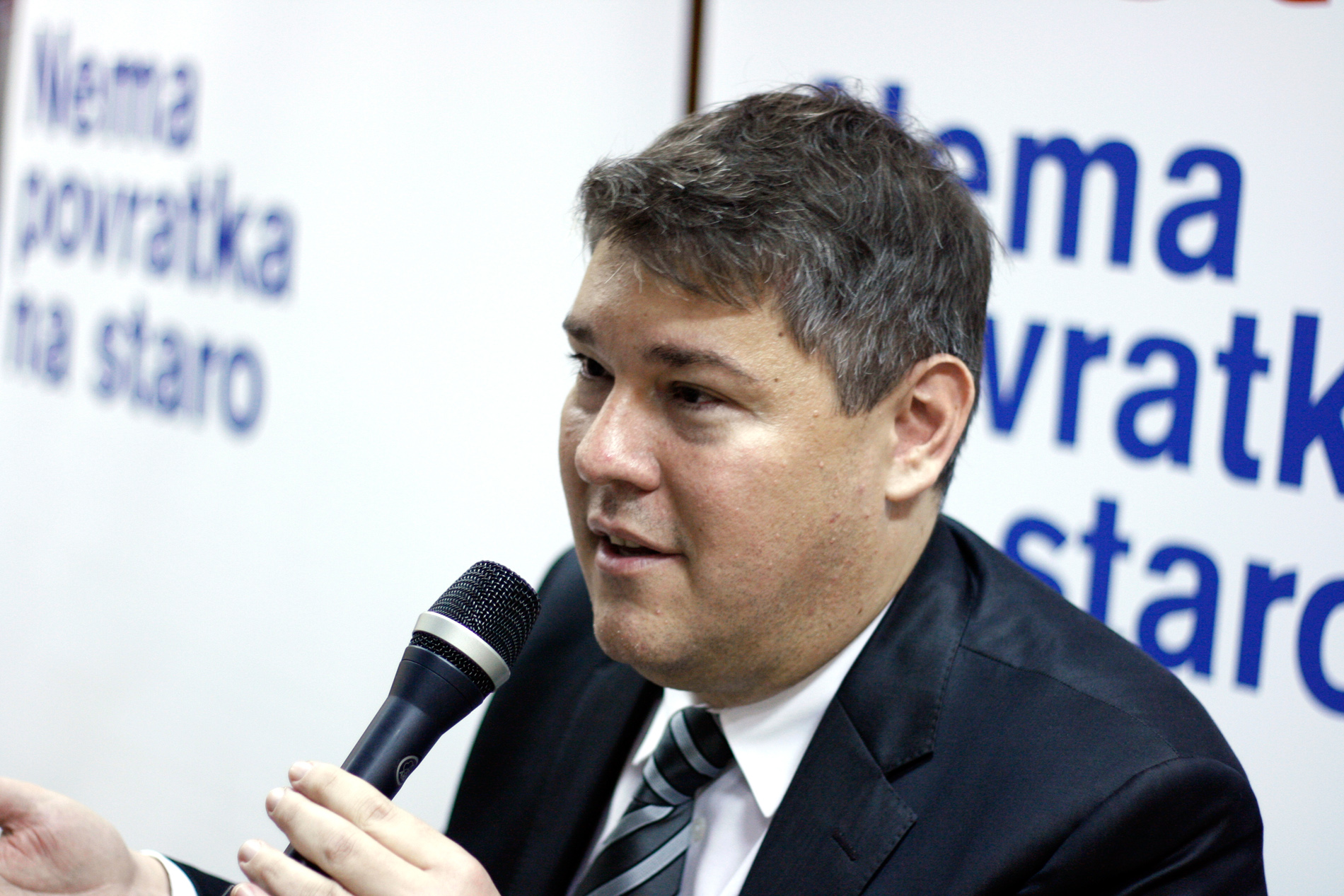

Minister of Finance
- In office 14 May 2014 – 22 January 2016
- Prime Minister: Zoran Milanović
- Preceded by: Slavko Linić
- Succeeded by: Zdravko Marić

Personal details
- Born: 16 November 1976 (age 49) Split, SR Croatia, SFR Yugoslavia (modern Croatia)
- Party: Social Democratic Party
- Spouse: Tončika Anastasia Lalovac
- Education: University of Dubrovnik; University of Zagreb

Boris Lalovac (born 16 November 1976) is a Croatian economist and politician who served as the 10th Minister of Finance in the center-left Cabinet of Zoran Milanović from 14 May 2014 until 22 January 2016. Lalovac is a member of the Social Democratic Party of Croatia and serves as one of four party vice-presidents since December 2016. He has been elected to the Croatian Parliament in 2015 and 2016 parliamentary elections, both times representing the 10th electoral district.

== Early life and education ==
Boris Lalovac was born on 16 November 1976 in Split to professor Obrad and homemaker Jasminka Lalovac. His father is active in local politics having served as SDP's municipal councilor in Gradac and member of the SDP's Split County Organization. After finishing elementary and high school in his hometown, Lalovac enrolled at the Faculty of Tourism and Foreign Trade of the University of Dubrovnik from which he graduated in year 2000. He gained his masters's degree at the Zagreb Faculty of Economics and Business in year 2006. From 2005 until 2006, he attended seminar "Basics of Credit Analysis" and in 2007 seminar "Finance, controlling, accounting, management", both organised by the Austrian Raiffeisen Bankengruppe.

== Career ==
After graduation, Lalovac first worked as finance associate at a joint-stock company Auto-Hrvatska in Zagreb. In 2002, he got employed as assistant lecturer on the payments course at the Split Faculty of Economics and Business. He worked on that position until 2007. From 2003 until 2004, Lalovac worked as deputy head of controlling at a limited liability company Karbon-Nova in Zaprešić. Between 2005 and 2011, he worked at the Raiffeisen Leasing as manager of Accounting, Finance and Reporting department. In 2008, Lalovac got employed as teacher at the Professional Business School of Higher Education LIBERTAS, and in 2010 at the College of Finance and law Effectus teaching courses "Analysis of the financial statements", the "Financial Control and Audit" and "Controlling". He still holds both positions. In 2012, he was named deputy minister of finance in the center-left Cabinet of Zoran Milanović, and in 2014 Minister of Finance succeeding Slavko Linić. Afterwards, he was elected to the Croatian Parliament in 2015 and 2016 parliamentary elections, representing the 10th electoral district.

== Personal life ==
Boris Lalovac is married to Tončika Anastasia Lalovac who is a Croatian Canadian, and a member of the conservative Croatian Democratic Union party. In January 2017, she accused him of verbal and physical harassment, after which he temporarily withdrew from public life. In April 2017, State's Attorney Office rejected all criminal charges filed against him as unfounded. He returned to politics.
