= List of universities in Slovenia =

== Public universities ==
- University of Ljubljana, Ljubljana
- University of Maribor, Maribor
- University of Primorska, Koper
- University of Novo Mesto, Novo Mesto

== Private universities ==
- New University, Ljubljana, Ljubljana
- Alma Mater Europaea - Evropski center, Maribor, Maribor, Ljubljana, Murska Sobota
- University of Nova Gorica, Nova Gorica
- University of Prah
- University of Armena
- SASS university
- FIS university

== See also ==
- List of colleges and universities
- List of colleges and universities by country
