= Education in Croatia =

Ministry of Science and Education
- Minister of Science and Education: Radovan Fuchs

National education budget (1999)
- Budget: HRK 13.091 billion

General details
- Primary languages: Croatian
- System type: National

Literacy
- Total: 99.7%
- Male: 99.9%
- Female: 99.5%

Education in Croatia is a right defended by Article 66 of the constitution which states that everyone is entitled to free compulsory education under equal conditions and in accordance with their aptitudes. Education is mandatory for children aged 6 to 14.

The educational system in Croatia begins with preschools-kindergartens. Children start their compulsory eight year long primary education from the age of 6 or 7. After finishing elementary school, students can continue their education, based on grades in elementary school, in four year non-compulsory secondary schools that are divided by the curriculum into gymnasia, vocational (technical, industrial, trade) and art (music, dance, art) schools. Since 2016, enrollment in higher educational institutions is determined by a student's scores on the Matura high-school exit exam. Institutions of higher education offer both university and professional studies. Higher education institutions are divided into polytechnics, colleges, faculties and academies of art. Since 2010, all study programs are aligned with the requirements of the Bologna Process. Five-year university programs enable students to work in science, education, business, the public sector, etc., and can be at undergraduate (BA), graduate (MA) or postgraduate (PhD) level. Professional studies last two to three years, and are offered at polytechnics and colleges. Upon completion, graduates get the title of professional bachelor (bacc).

Public primary and secondary schools, as well as institutions of higher education, are tuition-free. Students only pay for textbooks, basic equipment, cafeteria food, student dorms and other necessities, although the state also gives thousands of scholarships each year. In addition, the state pays health insurance for students. There are very few private schools in the country.

Education in Croatia has a long history, with the first university being University of Zadar, founded in 1396. The largest and oldest continuously operating Croatian university is University of Zagreb, founded in 1669. Today, there are 940 primary and 370 secondary schools, as well as 90 public and 32 private higher education institutions in Croatia.

== Educational system ==
Primary and secondary education is essentially free because it is mostly sponsored by the Ministry of Education of the government of Croatia. Higher education is also mostly free because the government funds all public universities and allows them to set quotas for free enrollment, based on students' prior results (usually high school grades and their scores on a set of exams at enrollment).

However, due to the low wages that teachers are paid, there are shortages of teachers throughout Croatia. This shortage of teachers has become an ongoing problem due to the number of educational programs in Croatia.

Population aged 15 and over by educational attainment
Year	Elementary education or less	Secondary education	Higher education
1961	85.6%	12.6%	1.8%
1971	75.9%	20.5%	3.6%
1981	65.1%	28.5%	6.4%
1991	54.0%	36.5%	9.5%
2001	40.6%	47.4%	12.0%
2011	30.8%	52.6%	16.4%
2021	20.4%	55.5%	24.1%

Criticism has been leveled at the students' participation rate in the classroom and their implementation of policies. According to Joseph Lowther, the Croatian “shares of education expenditure are 4% of the GDP which is well under the European average”.

Croatia signed the Bologna declaration at the Prague meeting of ministers in charge of lower education in 2009, thereby promising to adjust its system of higher education to the so-called Bologna process by 2010. The first students enrolled under the new setup in the academic year 2005/2006.

In 2005, the Croatian Government decided to start a redesign of the programme of primary and secondary education under the title Hrvatski nacionalni obrazovni standard (Croatian national educational standard). In the school year 2005/2006, a new system was tested in 5% of the primary schools.

Croatia had begun work on digitalizing its schools through a countrywide digitalization effort managed by CARNET, the Croatian National Research and Education Network. In a pilot initiative, 920 instructors and over 6 000 pupils from 151 schools received computers, tablets, and presentation equipment, as well as improved connection and teacher training. When the COVID-19 pandemic struck, those schools were ready to begin offering online programs within two days.

More than 1300 primary, secondary, and art schools in Croatia are expected to be entirely digitalized by the end of 2023. About 20 000 teachers and other educational personnel is expected to be trained. The goal is to give IT equipment to all Croatian schools, but also to educate instructors and generate digital instructional material, boosting the digital maturity level of Croatian schools.

=== Early childhood education ===
The early childhood development education is organized in kindergartens, which are not compulsory. There are three stages of early childhood education:

- from when the child is 6 months old to when they're one
- from the ages of one to three
- from the age of three until the child starts attending primary school

Even though these three stages are not compulsory, every child must attend kindergarten for a year prior to primary school.

There are over 450 kindergartens in the country; most of them are state-run, although there are also private ones. There are many kindergartens integrated with primary schools.

=== Primary education ===
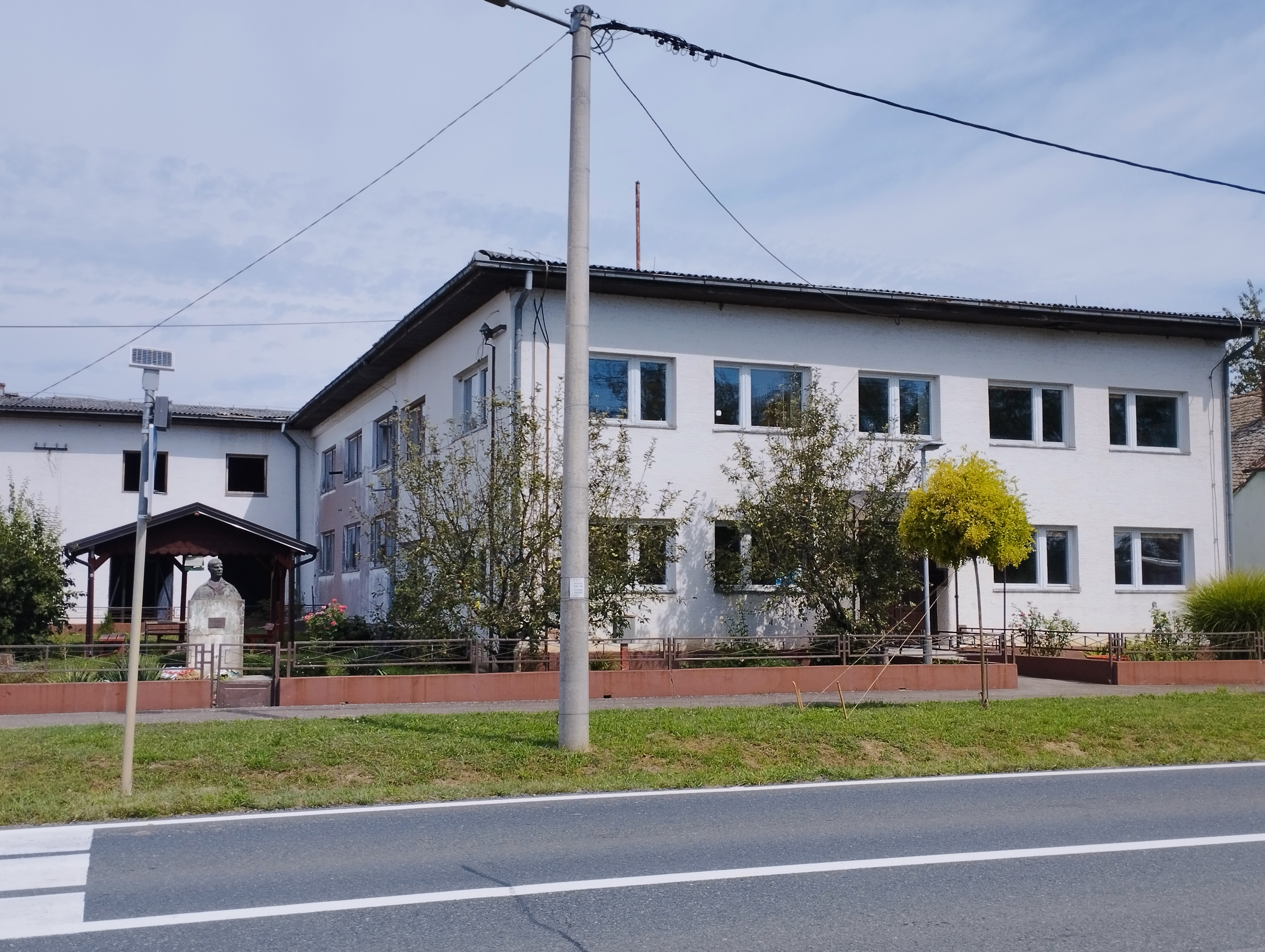
Local School Banovci, a part of Ilača-Banovci elementary school

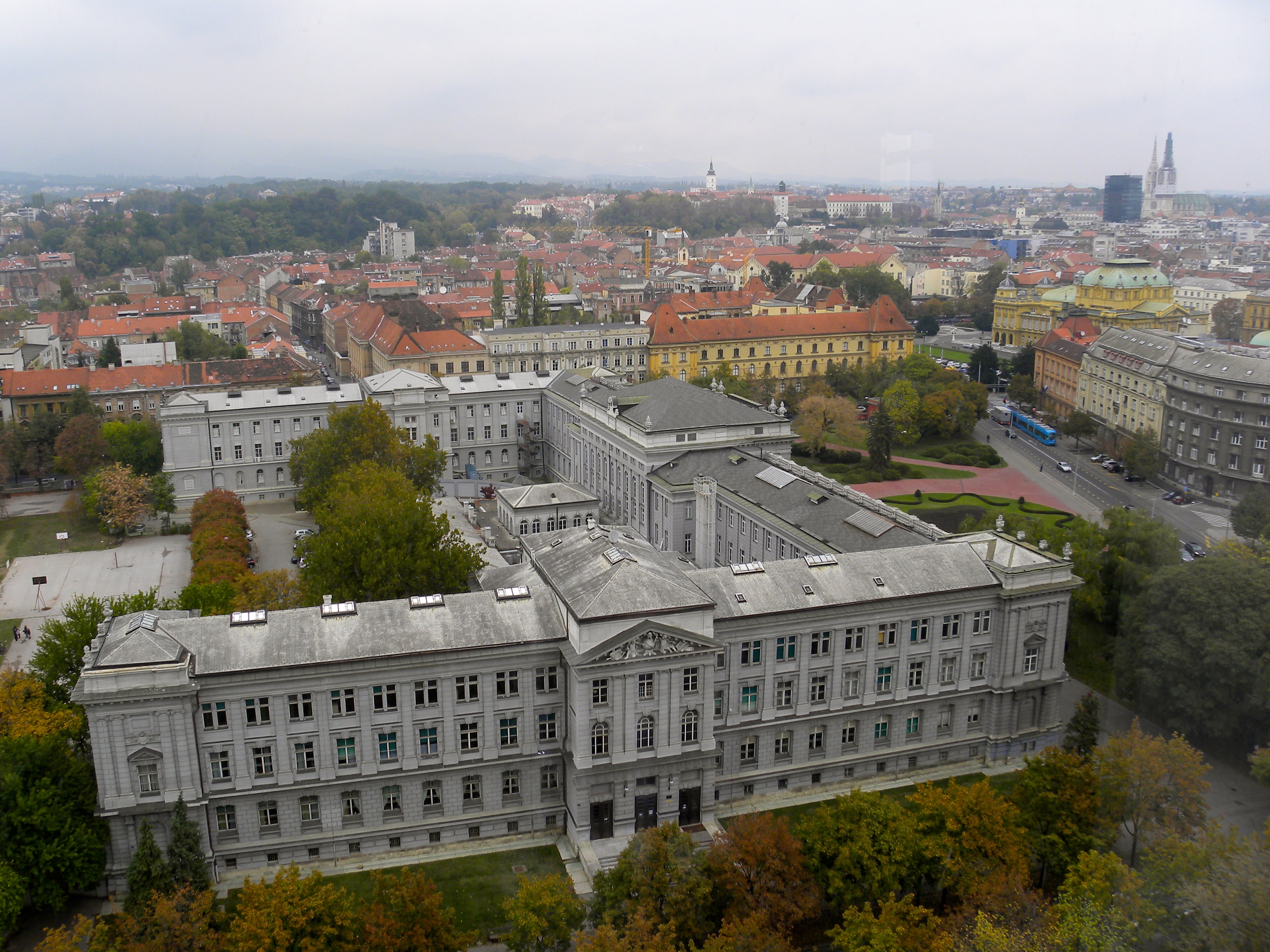
Elementary school of Izidor Kršnjavi, Mimara Museum palace, Zagreb

Croatian elementary (grade school) education lasts eight years, and is mandatory. Children begin school at the age of 6 or 7.

The students are divided into classes, and these classes are named X. a, X. b, X. c, etc., with X being the grade school year, for example 2. b, 3. d, etc., depending on the number of same-age students in a specific school.

Grade school education is split into two stages:

- grades 1 through 4, taught by one teacher per school year, who teaches every subject (except for foreign languages and religion) such as Croatian language, mathematics, culture of visual arts (likovna kultura), nature and society (priroda i društvo), physical education, culture of music, and at least one foreign language (often English, usually in the 1st grade and compulsory from the 4th grade). Religious education is an elective subject, and students can choose among Catholic, Orthodox and Islamic religious classes. The students stay in one classroom for the first 4 years.
- grades 5 through 8, where different teachers teach different subjects, with further subjects such as history, geography, biology, chemistry, physics, vocational education, informatics and, in addition to English, often a second language (usually German, French or Italian). The students no longer stay in the same classroom, but rather move around the school to get to their various classrooms.

Ever since primary school became mandatory during the Yugoslavian era, the literacy rate in Croatia is at a substantial level of 98.1%. The majority of children manage to complete grade school.

The majority of schools offer either English, German or Italian language classes as early as 1st grade. They then offer a second language class, starting from the 4th grade. The most popular foreign languages are English, German and Italian, followed by Spanish, French and Russian.

People who have completed only primary education are classified as "unqualified workers" (Croatian: nekvalificirani radnik or NKV) by the employment bureaus. 2.8% of Croatians never went to primary school, 15.7% never completed it and 21.7% have completed only primary education. 47% of Croatians have completed secondary education and 7.9% have a university degree.

There are currently 940 primary schools in Croatia. Public primary schools are under the jurisdiction of local governments, the cities and municipalities.

=== Secondary education ===
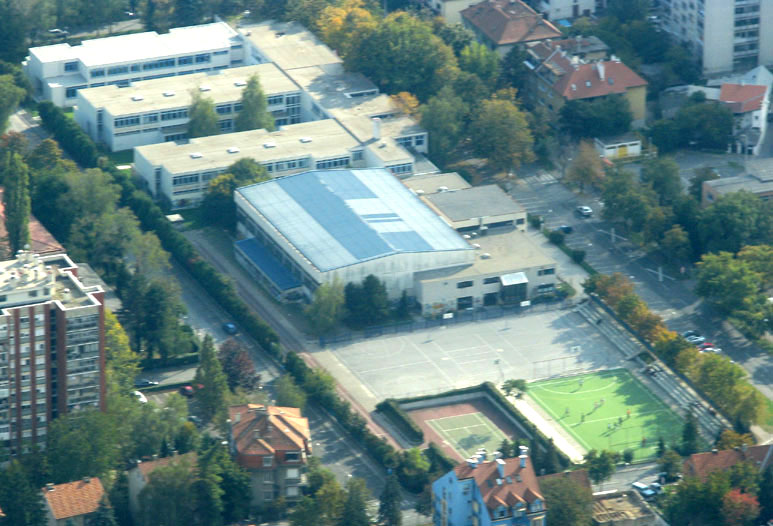
XV Gymnasium

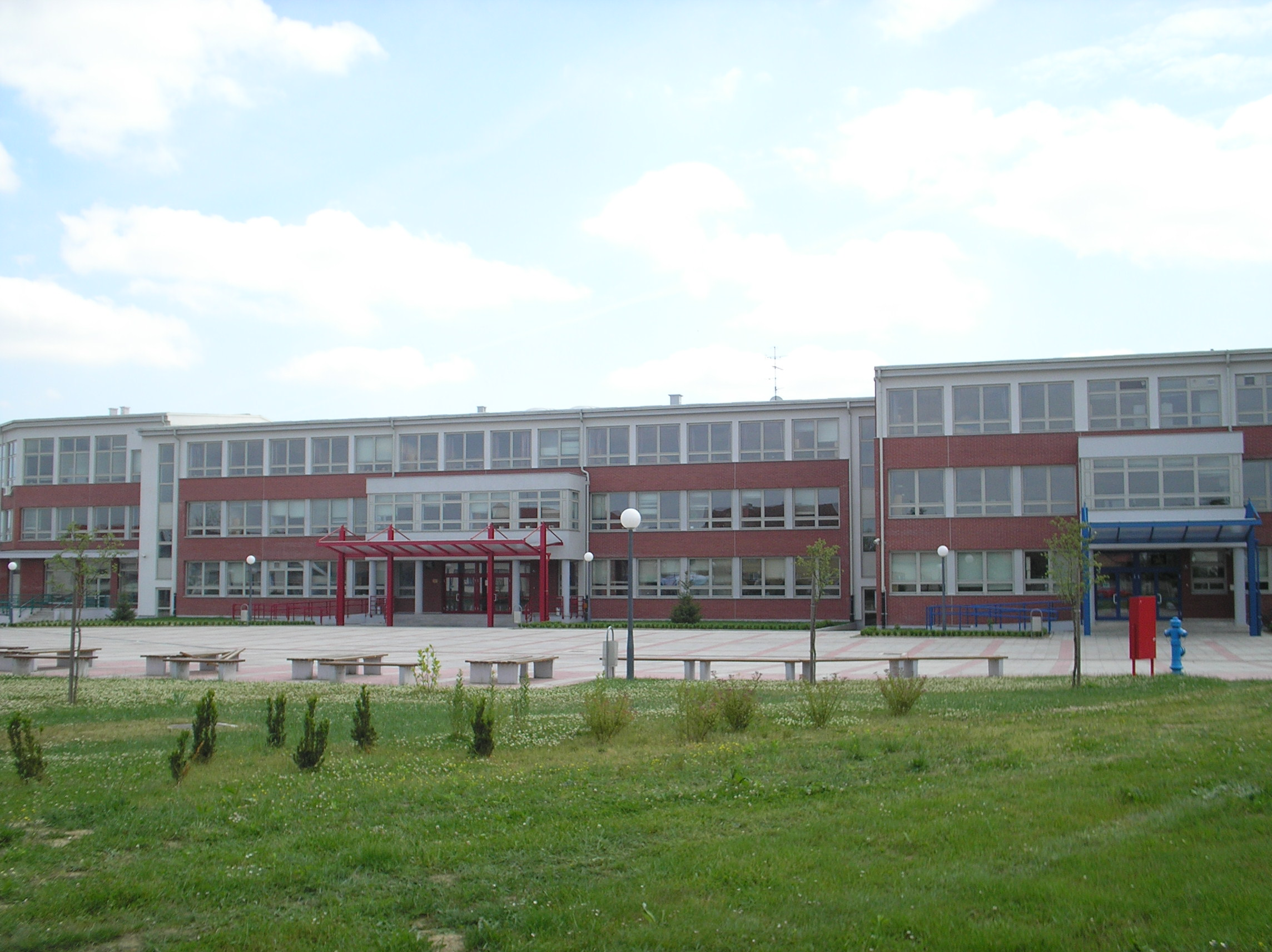
Secondary school center in Bjelovar

Secondary education is currently optional, although most political parties advocate the stance that it should become compulsory.

Secondary schools in Croatia are divided into:

- gymnasia with four available educational tracks; prirodoslovno-matematička gimnazija (specializing in math, informatics and science), jezična gimnazija (a focus on foreign languages and with less science), klasična gimnazija (a curriculum centered around classics, namely Latin and Ancient Greek) and opća gimnazija (a general education which is not as specific). As a general education school, gymnasia are a transition to professional training in colleges, universities, and faculties, i.e. it does not qualify students for a particular profession, but mainly focuses on further education. The subjects taught include: Croatian, mathematics, English, second foreign language (of choice), third foreign language (an option in foreign-language-centric schools only), Latin, art history, musical arts, history, geography, biology, chemistry, physics, sociology, psychology, information technology, politics and economics, philosophy, logics, physical education, and an elective (students may choose either religious studies or ethics as the elective). Education in gymnasia lasts for four years. It is harder to get into gymnasia than vocational or art schools and are generally harder to complete.
- vocational schools that teach students a certain craft, such as cooking or carpentry, and last three, four, or five years, depending on the chosen vocation. Economics and engineering schools fall under this category as well, and they last for four years. Medical high school is the only one that lasts for five years since the 2010/2011 school year.
- art schools that focus on visual arts, music, and similar. They last four years.

Secondary schools supply students with primary subjects needed for the necessary work environment in Croatia. People who complete secondary school are classified as medium expertise (srednja stručna sprema or SSS).

Graduates of vocational schools lasting for 4 years are allowed to sit for the national graduation exam (državna matura) and attend university. Graduates of vocational schools lasting 3 years can attend technical vocational higher education institutions, however both groups of students are also eligible to work after completing secondary school just like art school graduates, while gymnasium graduates must go to university.

The process of getting into a high school in Croatia is rather difficult. A student chooses 5 schools which they wish to attend (students that are interested in vocational schools may choose two programs within a school) and then list them by priority. A point system determines whether a student may enroll. The maximum number of points while signing up is 80; these points are gathered from primary school grades (from 5th to 8th grade) and other extra criteria, such as additional points for high placements in different subject knowledge competitions. Schools usually have quotas determining the number of students which can enroll in a particular school year.

There are currently around 90 gymnasia and 300 vocational schools in Croatia. Public secondary schools are under the jurisdiction of regional governments (counties).

=== Higher education ===
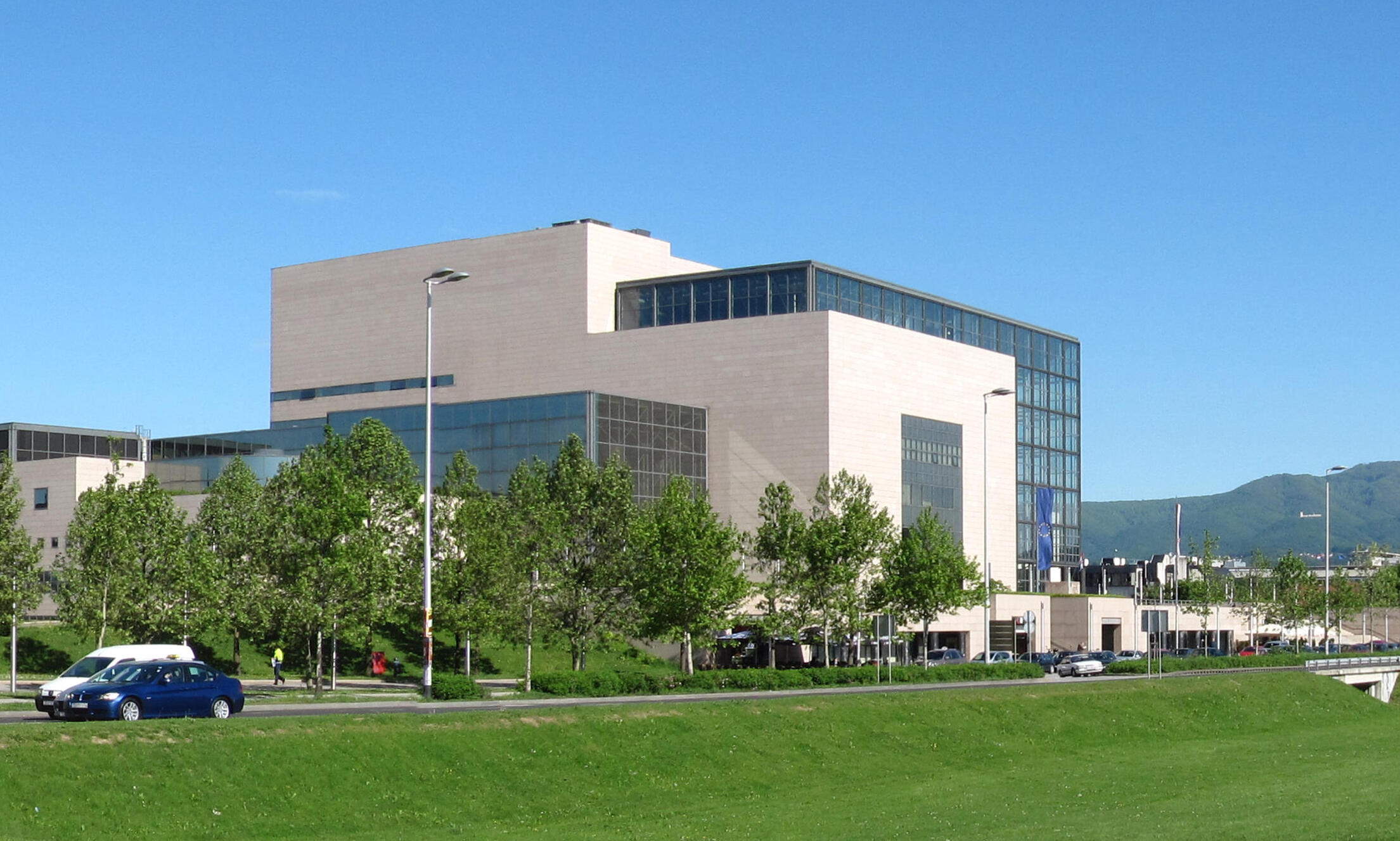
National and University Library in Zagreb

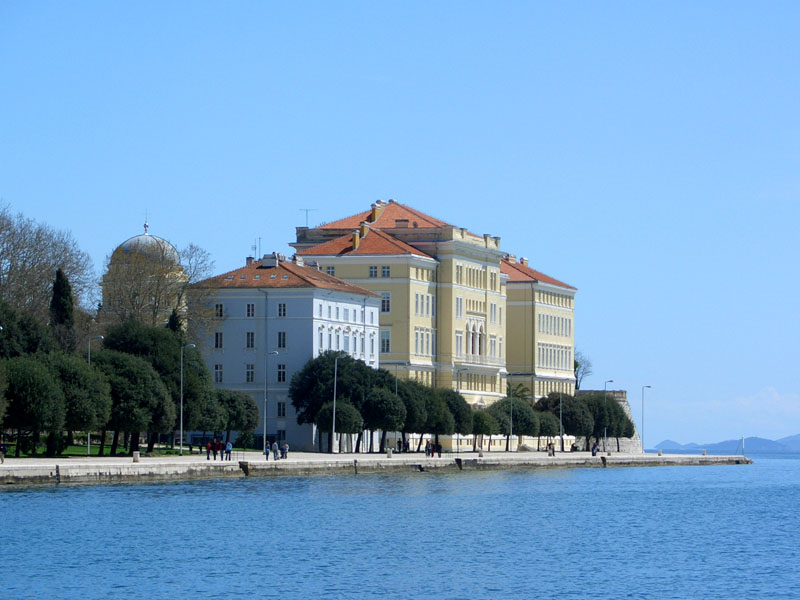
University of Zadar, 1396

Students may enroll into two basic kinds of higher education:

- polytechnic schools (veleučilište), higher-level education
- universities (sveučilište), highest level education

The distinction between the programs taught at universities and polytechnics used to be the length of studies and the final classification of the students. However, this line is being blurred by the implementation of the Bologna process. Previously, the veleučilište approximately matched the German concept of Fachhochschule.

People who previously completed a veleučilište were classified as having higher expertise (viša stručna sprema or VŠS). People who previously completed a sveučilište were classified as having high expertise (visoka stručna sprema or VSS). It was also possible to enroll in post-graduate studies and earn the distinctions of magistar and doktor znanosti (PhD). The 2003 changes to higher education legislation, which introduced the Bologna process in Croatia, abolished the terms "higher" and "high" expertise.

Since the Bologna process, the levels of expertise are:

- Bachelor of Science and Bachelor of Arts (prvostupnik)
- Master of Science and Master of Arts (magistar)
- Master of Education (magistar edukacije)
- Doctor of Science and Doctor of Arts (doktor)

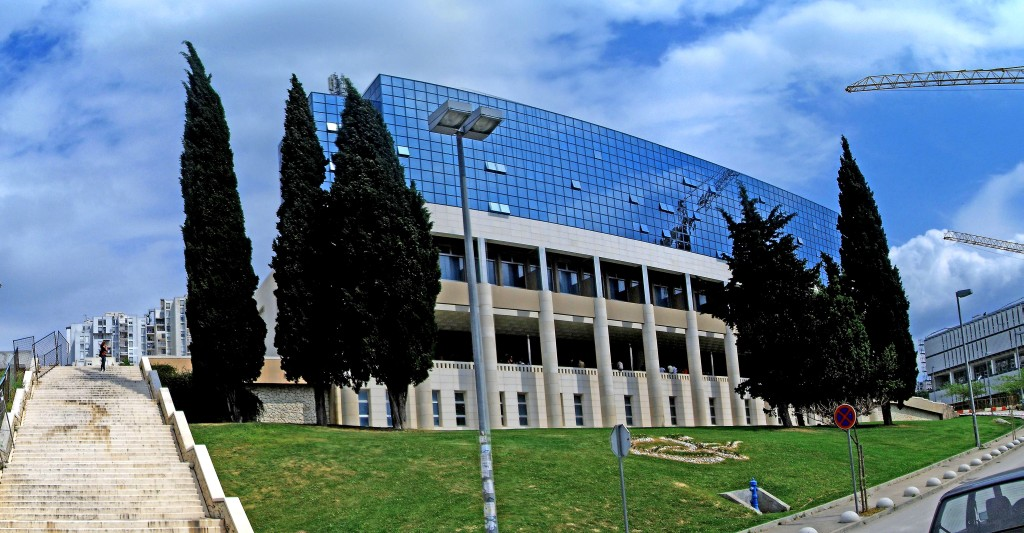
Faculty of Economics, University of Split

All larger universities in Croatia are composed of independent faculties (fakultet, meaning college or department). Each independent college or department maintains its own administration, professional staff (also known as a "faculty") and campus. The colleges focus on specific areas of learning: natural sciences, philosophy, law, engineering, economy, architecture, medicine, and so on. Although a university's colleges or departments are usually located in the same city as the administration of the university, some are located in different cities, such as Zagreb's University's Faculty of Metallurgy located in the city of Sisak. The universities of Dubrovnik, North (Koprivnica, Varaždin), Pula, Slavonski Brod and Zadar do not have independent colleges.

The description of the Croatian higher education system as of July 2008 is available from the official Croatian Guidelines for the Publication of Diploma Supplement, which was published by the Ministry of Science, Education and Sports of the Republic of Croatia in July 2008. Although the document itself is in Croatian, the English description of the higher education system is available from page 25.

Croatia had a significant negative tertiary education attainment gender gap of -22.3 pp in 2024.

=== Minority schools ===
A special law on minority education exists. Education of the representatives of national minorities is carried out in 24 elementary schools, where the program is conducted in the language and writing of a relevant national minority, while 61 elementary schools have classes with such program. There are six models of minority education.

=== Homeschooling and alternative schools ===
Home education was legal in Croatia in 1874 when Croatian law stated that parents had a duty to educate their children either at home or by sending them to school. The child had to pass an exam in a public school at the end of every school year.

The primary education in Croatia is compulsory from the age of six to fifteen and spans eight grades.

In September 2010 a religious organisation, Hrvatska kršćanska koalicija submitted a proposal to change the law so home education would become legal in Croatia. The civil organisation Obrazovanje na drugi način joined in and is now working on its own proposal.

The proposed model is based on Slovenian and Montenegrin model of home education. The child is required to enroll into a local school (public or private) and pass annual exam in certain subjects (mother language and math only in lower grades; with addition of foreign language in middle grades and more subjects in higher grades). If the child does not pass all the exams in two attempts, they are ordered to continue the education with regular school attendance. Every year the parents have to notify the school by the end of May that they will be educating their child at home.

Like in the case of Slovenia and Montenegro, the proposed model does not impose any limitation on who can home educate. The parents educating their children at home are not eligible to receive any kind of state help. The schools are free to choose whether they will allow special arrangements with children educated at home (flexi-schooling, the use of school resources, participation in field trips and other school activities, etc.). The Ministry of Education and schools are not required to provide any form of help to parents of children educated at home (teacher guides, worksheets, consultation, etc.).

The proposed model was chosen as it requires minimal change to the existing law and would be possible to implement within the current educational framework. The Croatian Constitution, in the Article 63 paragraph 1, states that parents have a duty to school their children. Similarly, in the Article 65 paragraph 1, it states that primary schooling is compulsory and free.

As of July 2011 there are three alternative primary schools in Croatia – one Montessori and two Steiner Waldorf schools. Alternative schools in Croatia are required to follow national curriculum (Article 26 paragraph 1, Article 30).

== Other educational institutions ==
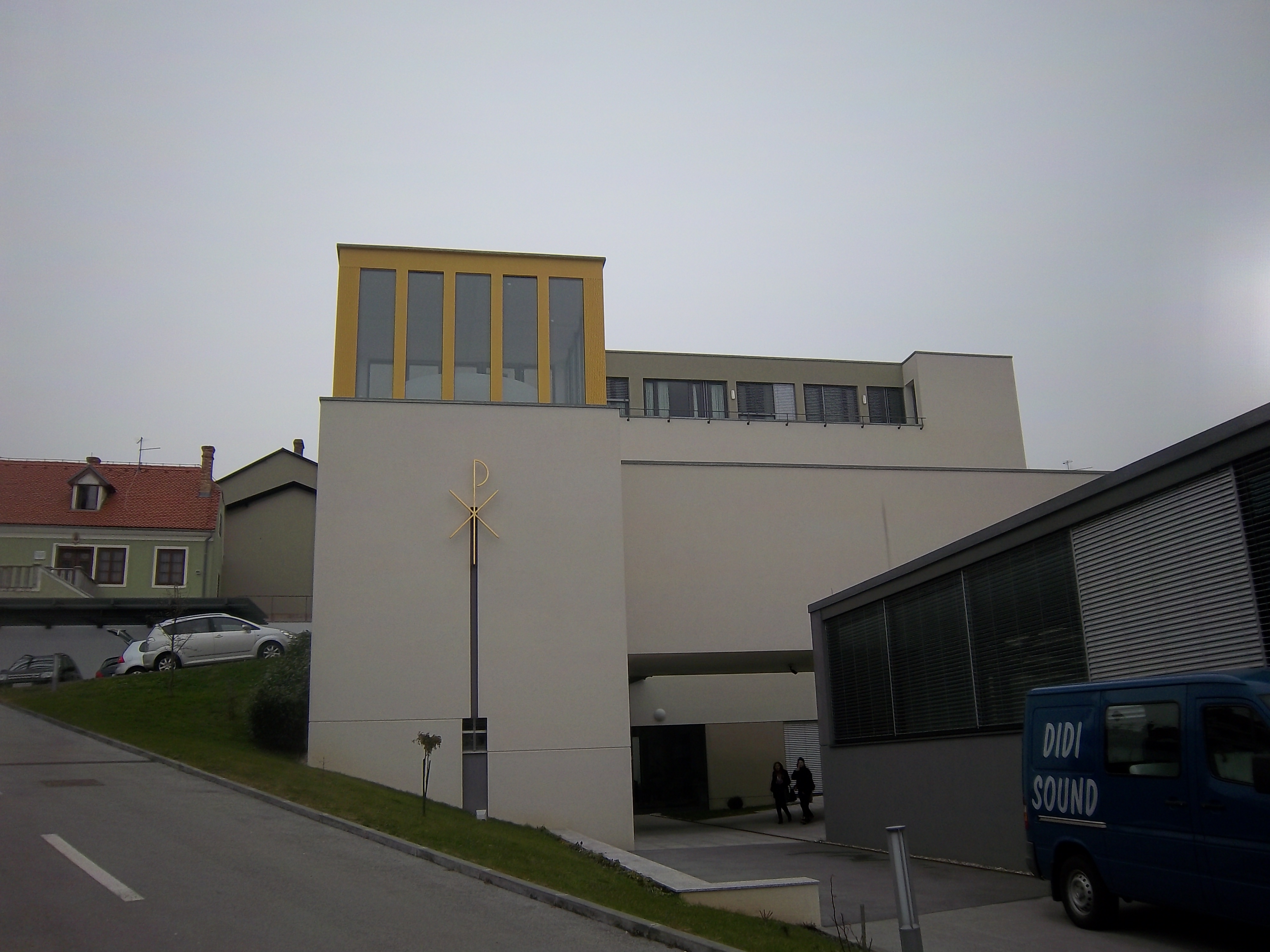
Serbian Orthodox Secondary School "Kantakuzina Katarina Branković"

Public music schools exist for the primary and secondary level in addition to public special education classes or schools. Students who attend music schools are still obliged to follow the regular program in their primary and secondary schools. The classes are usually held in the opposite shift of their regular school hours.

There are over thirty scientific institutes, including the Energy Institute "Hrvoje Požar" in Zagreb, the Civil Engineering Institute of Croatia, the Cultural and Scientific Center "Milutin Milanković", and the Institute "Ruđer Bošković" in Zagreb which is the largest in the country.

The Croatian Academy of Sciences and Arts in Zagreb is a learned society promoting language, culture, and science from its first conception in 1866. (The juxtaposition of the words typically seen in English as "Arts and Sciences" is deliberate.)

== See also ==
- List of high schools in Croatia
- List of institutions of higher education in Croatia
- List of schools in Croatia
- List of universities and colleges in Croatia
- Academic grading in Croatia
