= Croatian Customs Administration =

Croatian administrative organization

- Carinska uprava

Agency overview
- Formed: 8 October 1991; 34 years ago
- Type: Revenue service
- Headquarters: Alexandera von Humboldta 4, Zagreb, Croatia
- Employees: 2586 (2022)
- Annual budget: €105.822,174 million (2023)
- Agency executive: Mario Demirović, Director General of the Customs Administration
- Parent agency: Ministry of Finance
- Website: carina.gov.hr

The Croatian Customs Administration (Croatian: Carinska uprava) is the national administrative organization within the Ministry of Finance of the Republic of Croatia whose basic task is the application of customs, excise, tax and other regulations.

It organizes and supervises the work of the customs service, monitors and processes data on export, import and transit passage; monitors the collection of the State Budget revenues on the basis of customs duties, excise duties, special taxes and other levies; prevents and detects misdemeanours in the field of customs duties, excise duties and special taxes and conducts administrative and misdemeanour procedure due to violation of regulations; approves and carries out customs-approved treatment or use of goods.

== Organization ==
The Croatian Customs Administration consists of the Central Office, headquartered in the capital city of Zagreb and four regional customs offices, headquartered in Zagreb, as well as the next three largest cities in Croatia: Split, Osijek and Rijeka. In 2022, the Croatian Customs Administration had a workforce of 2586 employees. 760 of these (29,4%) had postgraduate education, 467 (18%) had undergraduate education and 1359 (52,6%) had four-year secondary education. Women made up 1100 (42,5%) of the workforce, while 1486 (57,5%) of the workforce was male.

=== Structure ===
- Director General of the Customs Administration
  - Director General's Office
  - Deputy Director General
    - Assistants to the Director General
      - Customs System Sector
      - Excises and Special Taxes Sector
      - Oversight Sector
      - Mobile Units Sector
      - Financial Sector
      - Sector for Human Resources, Legal Matters, European and International Cooperation
        - Heads of the Regional Offices

== History ==
The Croatian Customs Administration was officially established on 8 October 1991, with the proclamation of the Customs Law in the 53rd edition of the Narodne novine, which defined its jurisdiction, competence, customs tariff and organization. Border crossings were opened with Slovenia and Bosnia and Herzegovina between 1991 and 1992 on those parts of Croatian territory that weren't affected by the Croatian War of Independence.

In accordance with the United Nations Security Council Resolution no. 743, proclaimed on 8 May 1992, UNPROFOR was given the task of supervising the Croatian border and ensuring the permanent presence of police and customs officers, as well as the presence of state inspectors when deemed necessary. In order to prevent insurgents in the Republic of Serbian Krajina from receiving logistical support, which would continue to Serbo-Croatian conflict, the Security Council further proclaimed Resolution no. 796 on 7 August 1992. This resolution enlarged UNPROFOR's mandate and strength and established their permanent presence on all Croatian border crossings. As the war between Croatia and Yugoslavia continued, UNSC proclaimed Resolution no. 820 on 17 April 1993 which put an embargo on import, export and transit of goods from and into the United Nations Protected Areas on the territory of Croatia and Bosnia and Herzegovina. Additionally, customs officers from the United States, the European Union, Switzerland and Turkey were deployed to Croatian border crossing as well.

On 18 January 1995, the mini-Contact Group proposed the Z-4 Plan as a basis for negotiations to end the Croatian War of Independence, which would have put all customs related authority on the territory of the Republic of Serbian Krajina in the hands of the Croatian Customs Administration. As the plan was rejected on three separate occasions and as the occupied territory was liberated following Operation Storm, the Croatian Customs Administration was officially given the task of establishing customs oversight on 23 September 1995. The Knin Customs Office was established on the same day.

On 30 November 1996, the Croatian Customs Director General Josip Knezić and UNTAES representative Jacques Klein signed a memorandum which established The Transitional Customs and Immigration Service on the territory of the still occupied Eastern Slavonia, Baranja and Western Sirmium. Alastair Livingston was elected the director of the Transitional Customs Service, with Zdravko Milić and Mirko Jagetić serving as his deputies. The TCIS was integrated into the Croatian Customs Directorate on 14 July 1997, which gave the organization customs oversight within the entirety of the internationally recognized Croatian borders.

Croatia applied for European Union membership in 2003 and soon thereafter began preparations to implement all EU law in order to be approved by the European Commission, the European Council and the European Parliament, which would allow the country to eventually sign the 2011 Treaty of Accession. Part of this process was implementing European Customs law, which was wholly under the jurisdiction of the European Union, as per the Treaty of Lisbon. Croatia proclaimed the Statute for the implementation of Customs law on 25 September 2003. It was eventually replaced by the Regulation (EU) No 952/2013 Of The European Parliament And Of The Council, proclaimed on 9 October 2013. Since 1 July 2013, when Croatia officially joined the European Union, customs law has been in the exclusive competence of the European Commission.

== Legal framework ==
Customs officers gain their powers primarily from the Zakon o carinskoj službi (The Customs Service Law), although customs officers apply a number of other national and European laws as well. The Customs Service Law allows customs officers to:

- review and verify the authenticity and veracity of relevant documents
- perform identity checks and verify the identity of persons
- check and verify the status and properties of customs and excise goods
- issue warnings and orders
- temporarily restrict freedom of movement
- search, examine and inspect persons and goods
- track, inspect, stop and search means of transport
- enter, inspect and search business premises and facilities
- temporarily seize goods and documents
- use of force
