= Zrinski College of Economics, Entrepreneurship and Management =

Coordinates: 45.8011°N 15.9443°E

Nikola Šubić Zrinski College of Economics, Entrepreneurship and Management
- Visoka škola za ekonomiju, poduzetništvo i upravljanje „Nikola Šubić Zrinski“
- Former names: Zrinski College of Economics, Entrepreneurship and Management (at the time of accreditation)
- Type: private school
- Active: 2008–2019
- Accreditation: Ministry of Science, Education and Sport
- Dean: Ivica Katavić
- Location: Selska cesta 119, Zagreb, 10110, Croatia
- Website: Zrinski Group Website

The Nikola Šubić Zrinski College of Economics, Entrepreneurship and Management (Croatian: Visoka škola za ekonomiju, poduzetništvo i upravljanje „Nikola Šubić Zrinski“) was an accredited private higher education institution (business school) in Zagreb, Croatia that existed between 2008 and 2019. The college was a part of a group of private educational institutions which includes Katarina Zrinski School of Economics and Petar Zrinski Open University.

The college was the first higher education institution in Croatia that was permitted to conduct all its study programs via the online distance learning system. In 2019 the college was merged with the European Business School Zagreb once the Zrinski group acquired the school.

== History ==
The College was established in 2008 with the opening event taking place at the Croatian Chamber of Economy in Zagreb being attended by then Deputy Prime Minister of Croatia Jadranka Kosor. The institution was named after Zrinski family, a Croatian-Hungarian noble family.

In 2016 the college established formal cooperation with the town of Nova Gradiška. In 2017 the college signed an agreement with the Public Adult Education Center Umag and opened an regional office in Split. In 2019 the college was merged with the European Business School Zagreb once the Zrinski group acquired the school.

== See also ==
- List of universities and colleges in Croatia
- List of high schools in Zagreb
