= Lavoslav Ružička Polytechnic Vukovar =

Coordinates: 45°21′30″N 18°59′41″E

College of Applied Sciences "Lavoslav Ružička" in Vukovar
- Veleučilište "Lavoslav Ružička" u Vukovaru
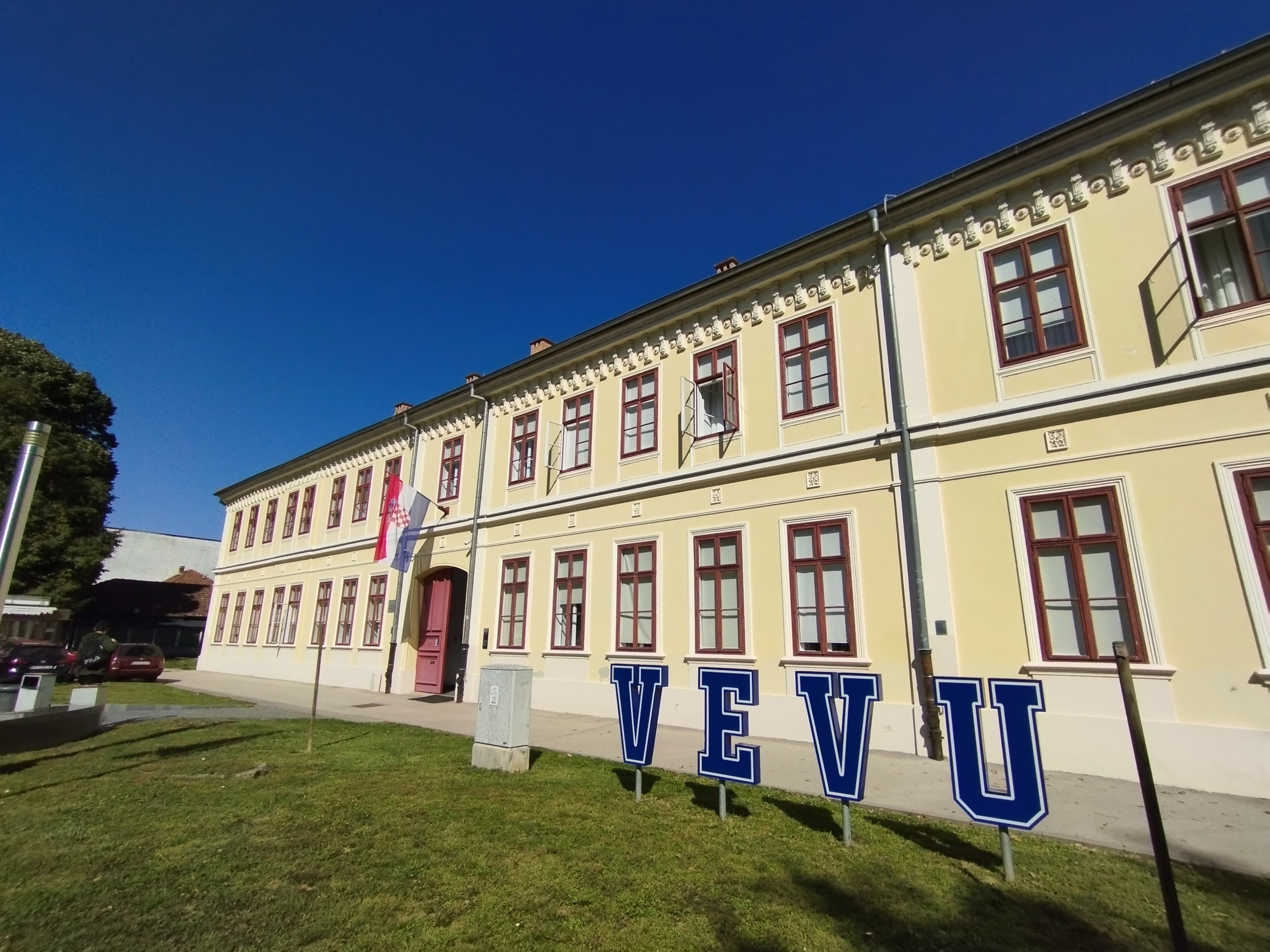
- Type: Public
- Established: 2005
- President
- Dean: Željko Sudarić
- Undergraduates: 600+
- Postgraduates: Preventive Physiotherapy Students
- Location: Vukovar, Croatia
- Campus: Suburban
- Nickname: VEVU
- Website: www.vevu.hr

College of Applied Sciences "Lavoslav Ružička" in Vukovar (Croatian: Veleučilište "Lavoslav Ružička" u Vukovaru) is an education institution situated in Vukovar, Croatia. College of Applied Sciences "Lavoslav Ružička" in Vukovar carries the educational programs of Trade Study, Administrative Studies and Physiotherapy Study.

== Name ==
The institution is named after Leopold Ružička a Croatian-Swiss scientist born in Vukovar and joint winner of the 1939 Nobel Prize in Chemistry who worked most of his life in Switzerland. The institution used croatized version of scientist's name leading to translation of Leopold into Lavoslav.

== History ==
The Decision on the Establishment of the Lavoslav Ružička Polytechnic in Vukovar was published in Narodne novine, the official gazette of the Republic of Croatia, on 27 August 2005. Polytechnic was open in the same year with 196 students in the first generation. The polytechnic was formally opened on 27 September 2007 by the Prime Minister of Croatia Ivo Sanader. The event was attended by Deputy Prime Minister of Croatia Jadranka Kosor, Minister of Science, Education and Sports Dragan Primorac and the town representative. Minister of Science, Education and Sports, provided 620,000 Croatian kuna for reconstruction of the Jirkovsky Palace which serves as the polytechnic's headquarters.

== Organization ==
As of 2020 Polytechnic offers four different study programs all of which in full-time capacity:

- Physiotherapy (Undergraduate Professional Study: 180 ECTS credits)
- Trade Studies (Undergraduate Professional Study: 180 ECTS credits)
- Administrative Law Studies (Undergraduate Professional Study: 180 ECTS credits)
- Preventive Physiotherapy (Specialist Graduate Professional Study120 ECTS credits)

== International cooperation ==
College of Applied Sciences “Lavoslav Ružička” in Vukovar have an Erasmus+ physical therapy student exchange program with the Lithuanian University of Health Sciences from Kaunas. Other institutions with established Erasmus+ student exchange agreements are University of Pécs, Alma Mater Europaea – Evropski center, Maribor, European Faculty of Law Maribor, Transilvania University of Brasov, Graduate School of Government in European Studies in Kranj, College of Rehabilitation in Warsaw, Tampere University of Applied Sciences, Ecole d'Assas, Haute Ecole d’Assas in Belgium, Acıbadem University, University of Novo Mesto, Powislanski College in Kwidzyn, Kristīgās vadības koledža, University of Dunaújváros, Tomori Pal College, Plovdiv Medical University, International Balkan University, University Business Academy in Novi Sad and the Modern Business School in Belgrade.

== See also ==
- List of institutions of higher education in Croatia
- University of Osijek
