= Marko Primorac =

Croatian politician (born 1984)

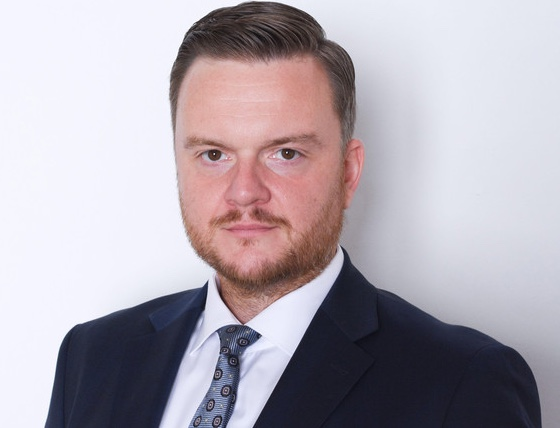
- Official portrait, 2022

Vice-President of the European Investment Bank
- Incumbent
- Assumed office 18 March 2026
- President: Nadia Calviño
- Preceded by: Teresa Czerwińska

Deputy Prime Minister of Croatia
- In office 17 May 2024 – 29 January 2026
- Prime Minister: Andrej Plenković
- Preceded by: Position established
- Succeeded by: Tomislav Ćorić

Minister of Finance
- In office 15 July 2022 – 29 January 2026
- Prime Minister: Andrej Plenković
- Preceded by: Zdravko Marić
- Succeeded by: Tomislav Ćorić

Personal details
- Born: 25 October 1984 (age 41) Zagreb, SR Croatia, SFR Yugoslavia (modern Croatia)
- Party: Independent
- Other political affiliations: Croatian Democratic Union (affiliated)

Marko Primorac (born 25 October 1984) is a Croatian economist and politician served as minister of finance from 2022 to 2026 and as a deputy prime minister from 2024 to 2026. He previously worked as an associate professor at the Faculty of Economics and Business of the University of Zagreb and was a consultant for the World Bank. From 2018 to 2020, he served as economic advisor to Kolinda Grabar-Kitarović.

In July 2022, the Croatian Democratic Union nominated him as a candidate for Minister of Finance following the resignation of Zdravko Marić. That same month, he took over the position and joined Andrej Plenković's government. He retained this role in the government established in May 2024, where he also became the deputy prime minister.
