= College of AGORA =

Croatian private higher education institution

College of market communications Agora – College of AGORA from Zagreb is an accredited private institution of higher education. Since December 2003, when it was founded, or more precisely from the academic year 2004 / 2005, College of market communications Agora from Zagreb implements undergraduate professional study programmes of market communication management and market communication design and a graduate professional study programme of creative market communication management.

== See also ==
- List of institutions of higher education in Croatia
