= List of universities and colleges in Croatia =

This is a list of universities and colleges in Croatia.

== Public institutions ==
=== Universities ===
- Dr. Franjo Tuđman University of Defence and Security
- University of Dubrovnik
- University North
- University of Osijek
- University of Pula
- University of Rijeka
- University of Slavonski Brod
- University of Split
- University of Zadar
- University of Zagreb

=== Colleges ===
- College of Agriculture in Križevci
- College of Computer Science Management in Virovitica
- Police College (Croatia)

=== Polytechnics ===
- Polytechnic of Šibenik
- Međimurje Polytechnic in Čakovec
- Polytechnic in Karlovac
- Polytechnic in Požega
- Polytechnic in Rijeka
- Polytechnic in Varaždin
- "Lavoslav Ružička" Polytechnic in Vukovar
- Polytechnic "Marko Marulić" in Knin
- Polytechnic "Nikola Tesla" in Gospić
- Zagreb University of Applied Sciences
- Polytechnic School for Social Sciences at Zagreb
- Professional Health School of Higher Education in Zagreb

== Private institutions ==
=== Universities ===
- Catholic University of Croatia
- Libertas University
- VERN' University
- Algebra University College

=== Colleges ===
- RIT Croatia
- Business College for Management in Tourism and Hospitality
- Business College "Minerva"
- Business School PAR
- Business College with Public Rights, Višnjan
- Business School "Zagreb"
- College for Inspection and Human Resource Management in Maritime Sciences
- College for Safety at Workplace
- College of AGORA
- College of Applied Computing
- College of Information Technology Zagreb
- College of International Relations and Diplomacy
- College of Management and Design "Aspira"
- Effectus - College for Finances and Law
- International Graduate Business School Zagreb
- Kairos College for Public Relations and Media Studies
- Professional Business School of Higher Education LIBERTAS
- Professional School of Higher Education for Business Administration Studies
- Professional School of Higher Education for Technology in Pula
- RRiF College of Financial Management
- Technical College in Bjelovar
- TV Academy - College of Multimedia and Communication in Split
- Zagreb College of Journalism
- Zagreb Polytechnic College
- Zagreb School of Economics and Management

=== Polytechnics ===
- Polytechnic "Baltazar Adam Krčelić", Zaprešić
- Polytechnic "Hrvatsko zagorje" Krapina
- Polytechnic Velika Gorica

== Former institutions ==
- Zrinski College of Economics, Entrepreneurship and Management (2008-2019, merged with the European Business School Zagreb)

== See also ==
- Education in Croatia
- List of schools in Croatia
