= List of schools in Croatia =

School education in Croatia is mainly provided by the Ministry of Education of the Croatian Government. The Constitution of Croatia section 65 defines primary and secondary education as mandatory and free.

- List of high schools in Croatia
  - List of high schools in Zagreb

== See also ==
- Education in Croatia
- List of institutions of higher education in Croatia
