= Slavko Linić =

Croatian politician and economist

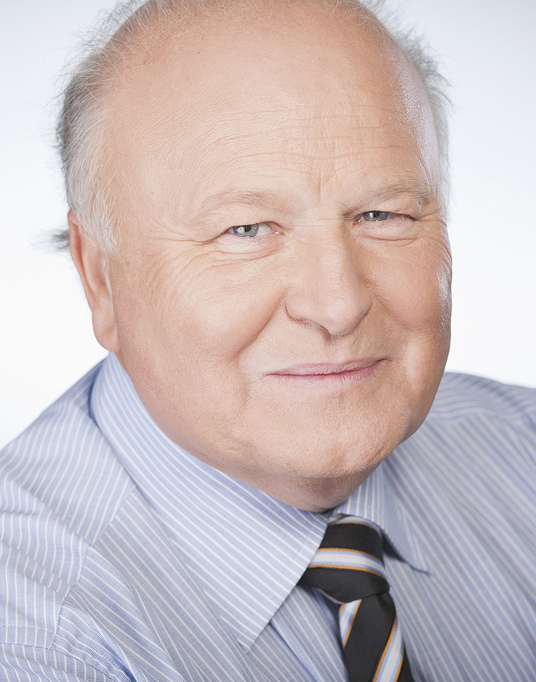

Minister of Finance
- In office 23 December 2011 – 6 May 2014
- Prime Minister: Zoran Milanović
- Preceded by: Martina Dalić
- Succeeded by: Boris Lalovac

Deputy Prime Minister of Croatia
- In office 27 January 2000 – 23 December 2003
- Prime Minister: Ivica Račan
- Preceded by: Ivica Kostović
- Succeeded by: Jadranka Kosor; Andrija Hebrang

Mayor of Rijeka
- In office 19 April 1993 – 2 March 2000
- Preceded by: Željko Lužavec
- Succeeded by: Vojko Obersnel

Personal details
- Born: 19 September 1949 (age 77) Grobnik, PR Croatia, FPR Yugoslavia
- Party: Social Democratic Party (until 2014)
- Other political affiliations: Successful Croatia (from 2015)
- Education: University of Rijeka

Slavko Linić (born 19 September 1949) is a Croatian politician and economist. He is a graduate of the Faculty of Economics on the University of Rijeka. From 1990 to 2000, he was the Mayor of Rijeka. From 2000 to 2003, he served as deputy prime minister under Ivica Račan. Between December 2011 and May 2014, he was the Minister of Finance in the government of Zoran Milanović.
