= Vukovar Gymnasium =

Coordinates: 45°20′46″N 19°00′30″E

Vukovar Gymnasium Gimnazija Vukovar Гимназија Вуковар

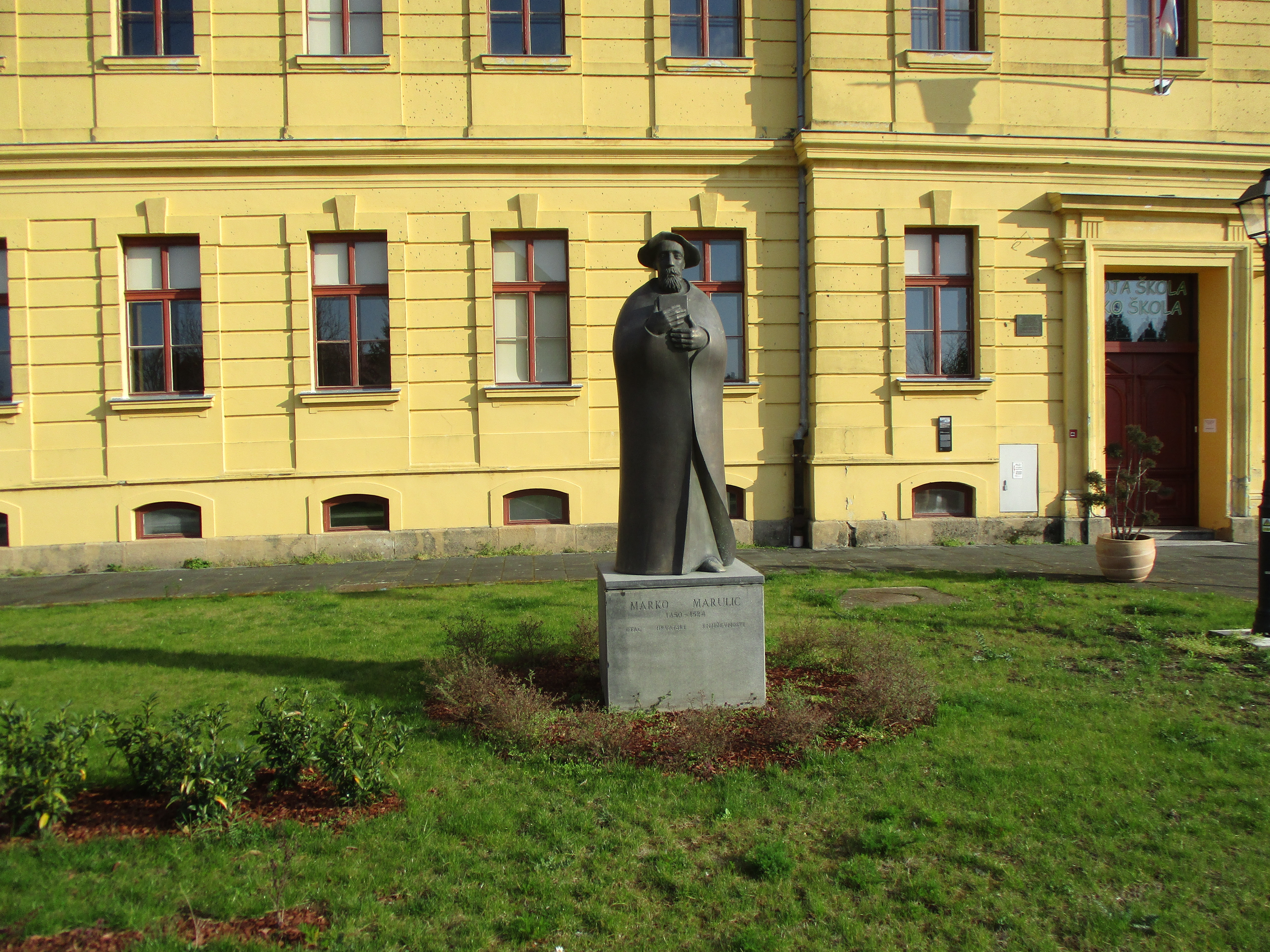
- Šamac 2; 32000 Vukovar; Vukovar; Croatia

Information
- Type: Public
- Established: 1891
- Enrolment: 384 (2014-2015 school year)
- Language: Croatian and Serbian
- Campus: Urban
- Website: gimnazija-vukovar.skole.hr

Vukovar Gymnasium (Serbo-Croatian: Gimnazija Vukovar/Гимназија Вуковар) is a secondary school (gymnasium) in Vukovar in eastern Croatia. Vukovar Gymnasium curriculum is divided into three specializations with the first one being general social science, the second one science and the third one languages. Classes are held separately in Croatian and Serbian language, both of which are standardized varieties of Serbo-Croatian. In the school year 2007/2008, 384 students were enrolled. Of these, there were 248 female and 136 male students.

== History ==
The gymnasium was opened in 1891 at the Kod zvijezde facility. 44 male pupils enrolled at that time, and the first principal of the new school was Joseph Vitanović. In 1894 school moved to specifically constructed premises for it which costed 35,500 Forints at that time. In 1895, female pupils were enrolled for the first time, and partial state funding began, culminating in full state funding in 1912, when the school was attended by 240 pupils.

=== Separate Croatian and Serbian classes controversy ===
Since the completion of the United Nations Transitional Administration for Eastern Slavonia, Baranja and Western Sirmium mandate, students studying in Croatian or in Serbian are taught in separate classrooms in separate groups. Some (notably, but not exclusively, right wing and nationalist Croat groups) have seen that practice as the implementation of segregation policies in education. This claim was strongly challenged by minority representatives themselves who underline that parents in Vukovar are free to choose in which language group to enroll their children. They insist that therefore one cannot talk about segregation from the point of view of international law as defined in the Convention against Discrimination in Education. They point to the Article 2, paragraph B, explicitly stating that minority groups are entitled to conduct specific forms of education which shall not be perceived as segregation.

== Alumni ==
After the school year 2023/24, 59 graduates of this gymnasium enrolled at an institution of higher learning in Croatia, or 81.94% of students who took up the nationwide Matura exams. The most common destinations for these students were the University of Osijek faculties of medicine, law, electrical engineering, computing and IT, humanities and social sciences, as well as the Lavoslav Ružička Polytechnic Vukovar.
