= Professional Business School of Higher Education LIBERTAS =

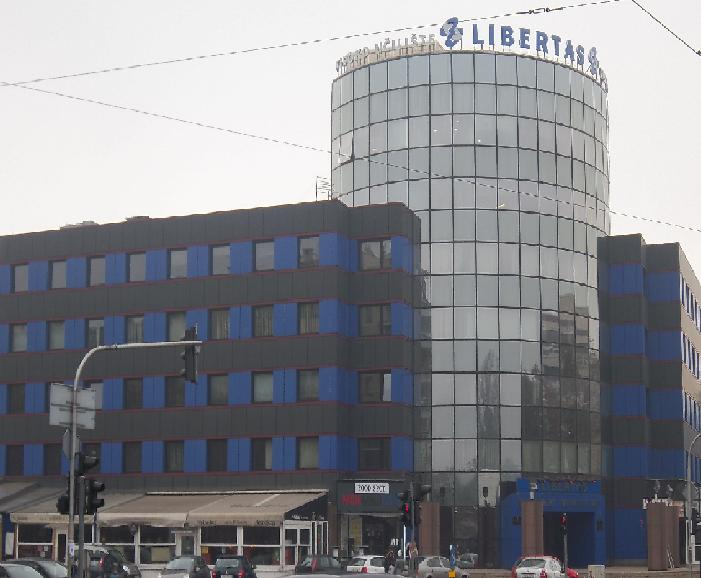
- Type: Private
- Established: 2004
- Students: 3000
- Location: Zagreb, Croatia
- Campus: Urban

Libertas Business College was founded in 2004 with the aim of educating and preparing students for the challenging environment of the global economy. The educational programme, currently attended 600 students, is designed in accordance with the Bologna Declaration.

== See also ==
- List of universities and colleges in Croatia
