= Srednja škola Petrinja =

Location
- 3 Ivana Gundulića; Petrinja; Croatia

Information
- Funding type: Public high school
- Founded: 1860
- Grades: 1-4: Gymnasium
- Newspaper: Kvaka
- Website: http://www.ss-petrinja.skole.hr/

Srednja škola Petrinja is a public high school in the town of Petrinja, in Sisak-Moslavina County, Croatia.

The Neo-Renaissance school building, built in 1871, was severely damaged in the 2020 Petrinja earthquake.
