= University of Rijeka =

Public university in Rijeka, Croatia

- Sveučilište u Rijeci
- Latin: Universitas studiorum Fluminensis
- Type: Public
- Established: 1973
- Rector: Snježana Prijić-Samaržija
- Students: 17,443 (2018)
- Location: Rijeka, Croatia; 45°19′40″N 14°26′27″E
- Website: www.uniri.hr

University rankings

Regional – Overall
- QS Emerging Europe and Central Asia: 108 (2022)

The University of Rijeka (Croatian: Sveučilište u Rijeci) is a public university located in the city of Rijeka, Croatia, with faculties in cities throughout the regions of Primorje, Istria and Lika.

The University of Rijeka is composed of eleven faculties, one art academy, two departments, university libraries, and the Student Centre Rijeka (SCRI).

== History ==
While the modern university was founded on May 17, 1973, the first school of higher education had been established in 1627 by the Jesuits, and enjoyed equal status with the academies in the largest cities of the Austrian Empire. The Faculty of Philosophy, established in 1726, operated for two years. The Theological Faculty was founded in 1728. From 1773 to 1780, Rijeka was the seat of the Royal Academy. The modern day university was established during 1970's, a decade of exponential rise in number of higher education institutions in the former Yugoslavia when, alongside Rijeka, universities in Osijek, Kragujevac, Split, Mostar, Podgorica, Bitola, Maribor, Banja Luka and Tuzla all opened their doors.

The departments of biotechnology, informatics, mathematics and physics were founded in 2008. In 2022, the Department of Mathematics and the Department of Informatics became faculties in their own right.

In the early afternoon of 18 April 2009, a fire broke out at the construction site of the new building of the Faculty of Engineering in Trsat, the site of former barracks. The fire engulfed three floors, and was most likely started by a welding spark. The Rijeka fire department responded and was quickly joined by first responders from Opatija. All construction workers were successfully evacuated and no injuries were reported. Construction at the site had begun in 2005 and ended costing over 300 million euros.

== Administration ==
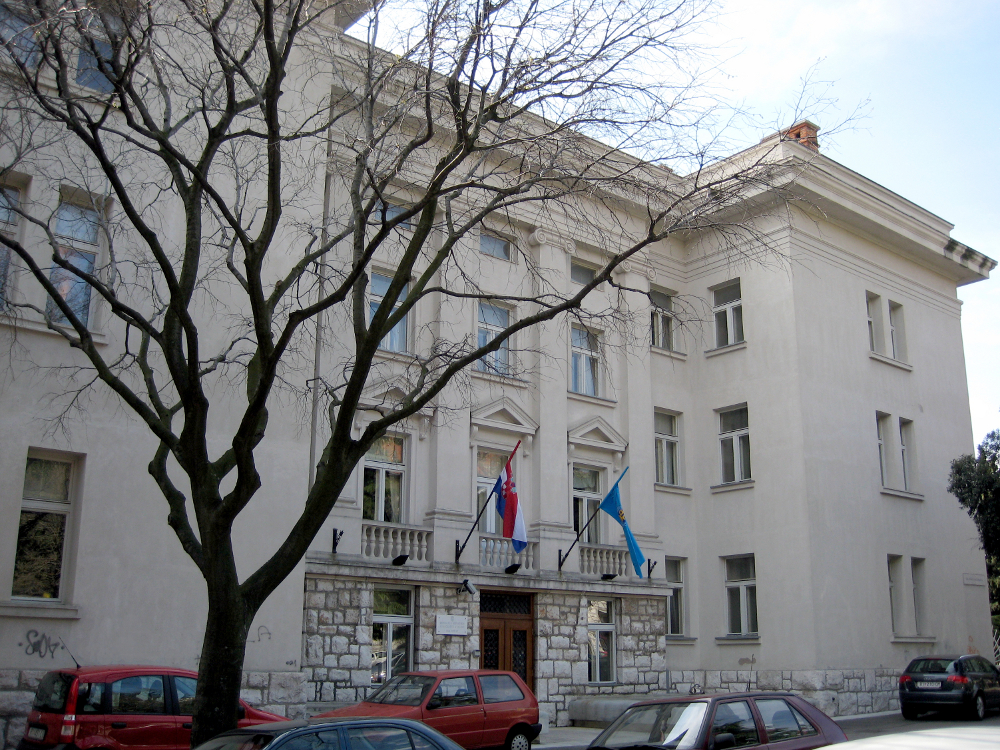
Rectorate

The eleven faculties, one academy and two departments include:

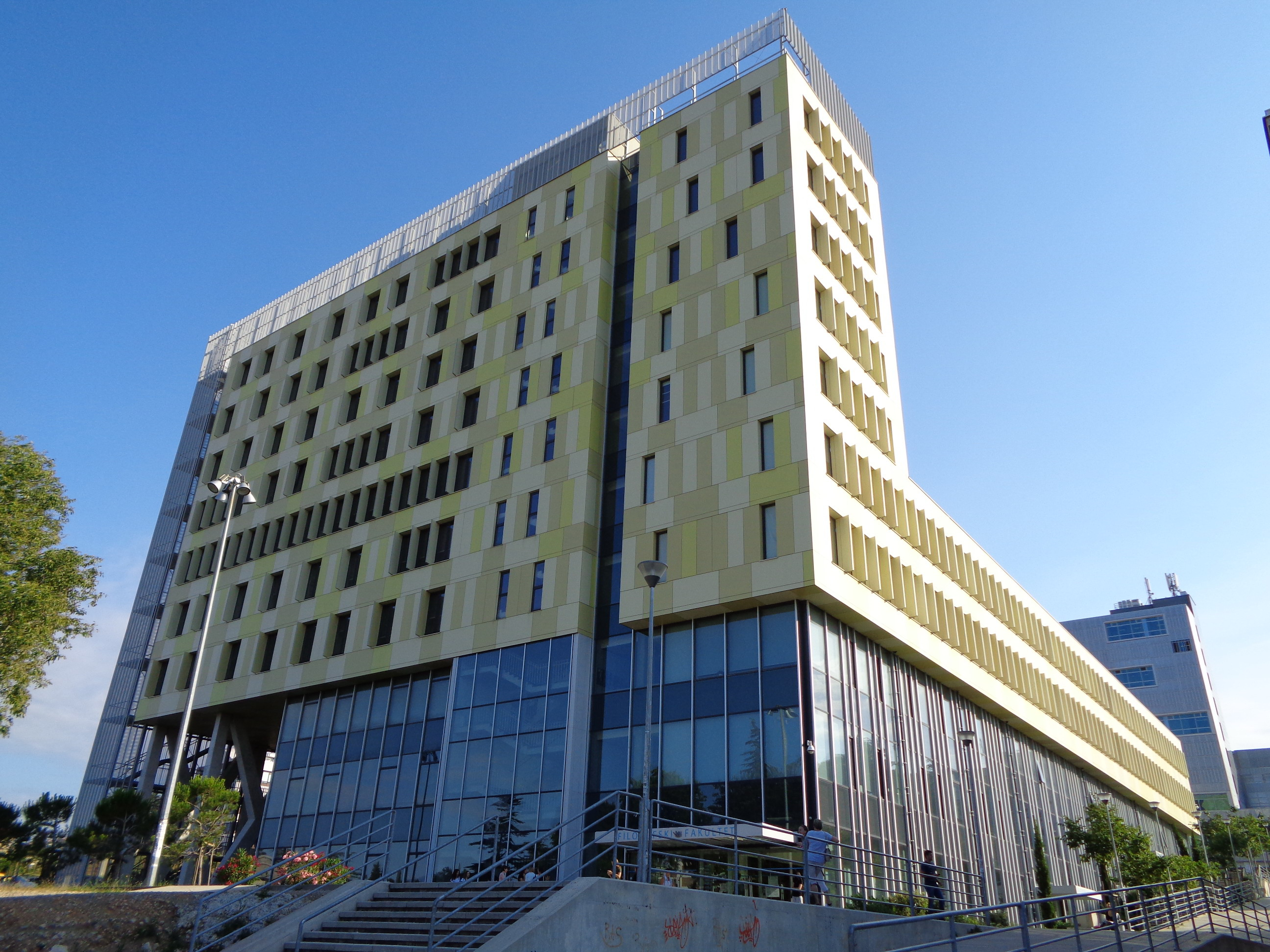
Faculty of Philosophy building

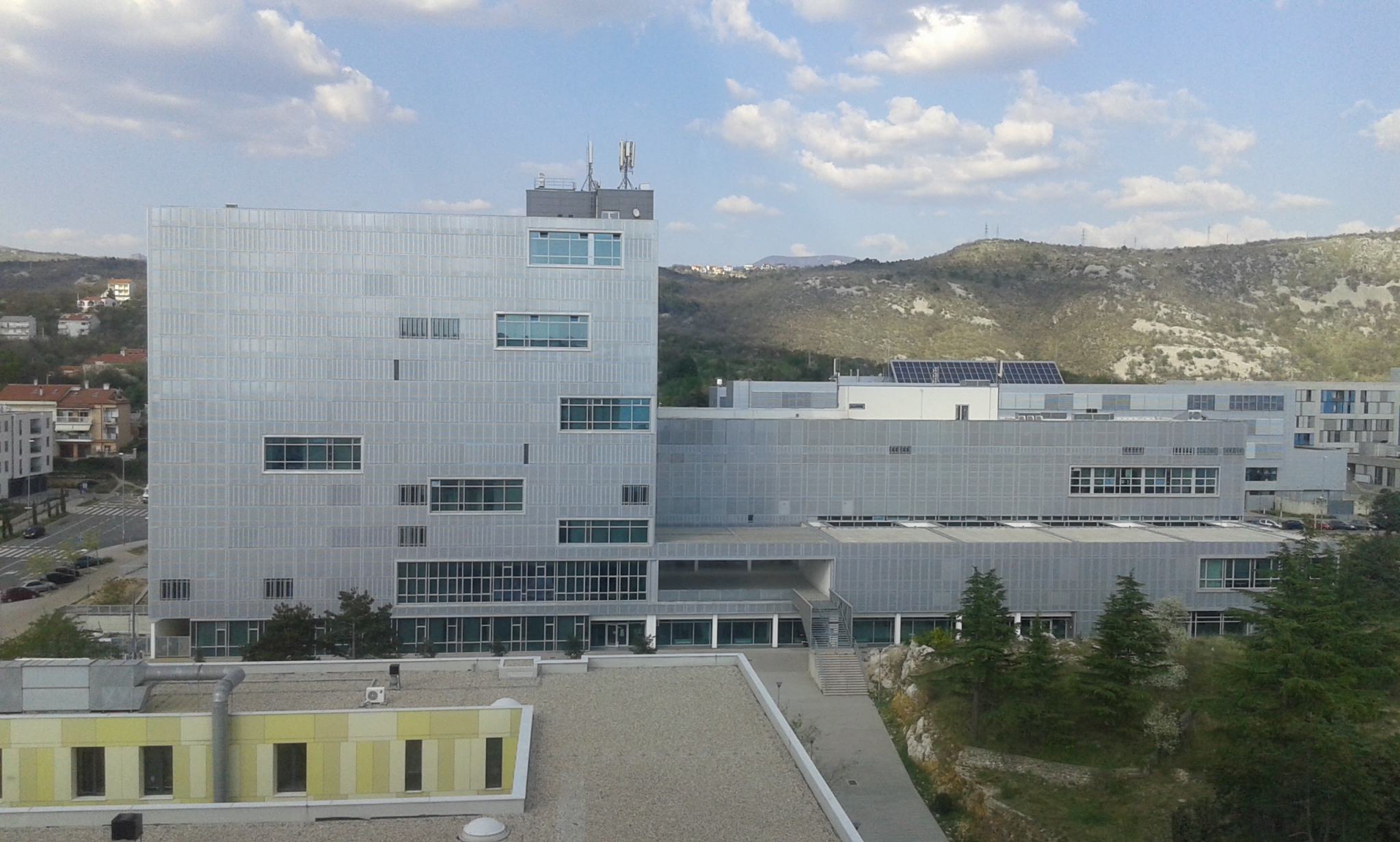
Building of Department for Mathematics, Informatics and Physics

=== Faculties and academies ===
- Academy of Applied Arts
- Faculty of Civil Engineering
- Faculty of Economics
- Faculty of Engineering
- Faculty of Humanities and Social Sciences (Faculty of Philosophy)

- Department of Philosophy

- Faculty of Law
- Faculty of Maritime Studies
- Faculty of Medicine
- Faculty of Teacher Education
- Faculty of Tourism and Hospitality Management (based in Opatija)

==== Faculty of Informatics ====
Since the implementation of the Bologna process in the academic year 2005/06, the Faculty of Informatics offers two undergraduate programmes (three years):

- Informatics
- Informatics in combination with another subject offered at Faculty of Arts and Sciences

Students finish with the title Bachelor of Science in Informatics. Both programmes introduce the foundations of programming, algorithms, data structures, digital electronics, computer architecture, computer networks, operating systems, databases, information systems, formal languages and automata theory, software engineering, logic programming, web engineering, multimedia and information theory.

After receiving the B.Sc. degree, the student can apply for the Master's degree in four programmes (two years):

- Information and communication systems,
- Business informatics,
- Informatics education,
- Informatics education in combination with another subject education offered at Faculty of Arts and Sciences

which ends with the title Master of Science (M.Sc.) in Informatics or Master of Education (M.Ed.) in Informatics.

In 2012, University of Rijeka Department of Informatics became Nvidia CUDA Teaching Center.

==== Faculty of Mathematics ====
Since the implementation of the Bologna process in the academic year 2005/06, the Faculty of Mathematics offers an undergraduate program (three years) in Mathematics, which finishes with the title Bachelor of Science in Mathematics. Courses include standard topics in mathematical analysis, linear algebra, numerical mathematics, combinatorics graph theory, affine spaces and particularly Euclidean spaces, metric spaces, topology, set theory, geometry, number theory, mathematical logic, probability and statistics, mathematical modelling, programming, algorithms, information systems and computer architecture.

After receiving the B.Sc. degree, the student can apply for the Master's degree in two programmes (two years):

- Mathematics education,
- Mathematics and Informatics education, together with Department of Informatics.

In 2010, the Department of Mathematics organized a conference on Information Security and Related Combinatorics under the NATO Science for Peace and Security programme.

=== Departments ===
On April 1, 2008, University of Rijeka decided to make the Faculty of Arts and Sciences, departments of Informatics, Mathematics and Physics into independent departments.

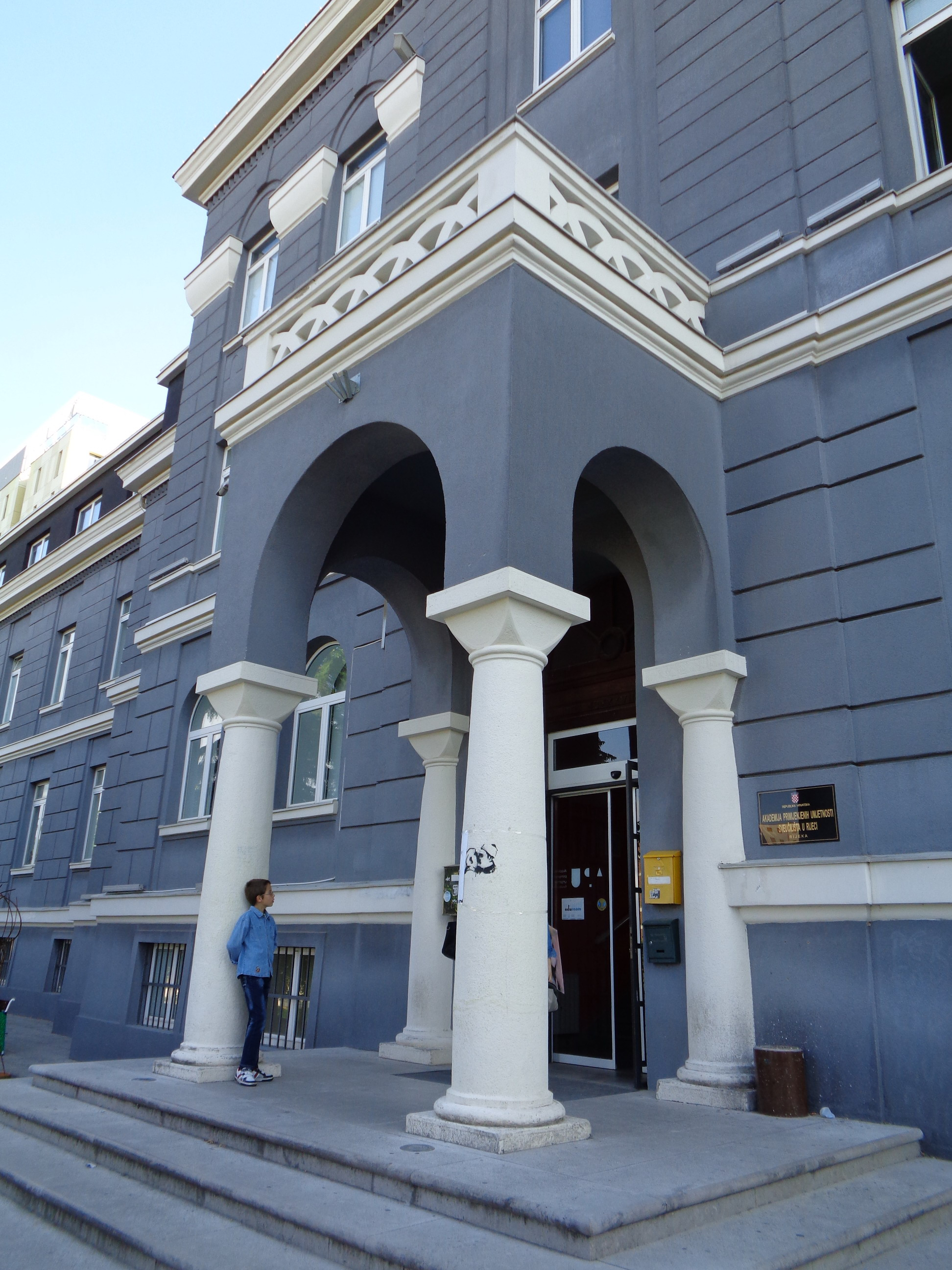
Entrance of the Academy of Applied Arts

- Department of Biotechnology
- Department of Physics

==== Department of Biotechnology ====
The Department of Biotechnology was founded in 2008 and currently has over 60 members of staff. It is located in the Departments building of the university campus at Trsat. The department offers one undergraduate degree program "Biotechnology and Drug Research", 3 masters programs "Drug Research and Development", "Biotechnology in Medicine" and "Medical Chemistry", 1 masters program in English "Biotechnology for the life sciences" and one doctoral program "Medical Chemistry". Further information can be found on their website.

=== Centers ===
==== Center for Iconographic Studies ====
The Center for Iconographic Studies (CIS) is a research center in the Faculty of Humanities and Social Sciences. CIS was founded with the idea of promoting iconography and iconology, as academic disciplines, and to establish a platform for academics from different disciplines to research the interpretation of visual arts. The Center organizes the annual conference of iconographic studies, as well as lectures, workshops and symposia, international networking and research projects, and it is involved in doctoral programs. CIS also publishes IKON - the journal of the iconographic studies.

The Department of Art History at the University of Rijeka in collaboration with the Department of Theology at the University of Zagreb organized the first conference of iconographic studies in 2007, and thus conceived the idea of establishing the center that is intended to become the platform for academics from different disciplines in researching the interpretation of visual arts. In 2008 the proceedings of the 2007 conference were published, and both conference and the journal continue to be organized annually. In 2011 CIS organized Art History Day in Rijeka, which has become an annual event for the region, especially oriented towards students and younger people. PURITEKA, an e-journal for students' articles has also been published. Since 2010, CIS has been a partner to a European project in culture: "Francia media – Cradles of European Culture".

The Center for Advanced Studies of Southeastern Europe (CAS – SEE) "is an organizational unit of the University of Rijeka specialized in the social sciences and humanities. Designed as a regional hub for high-level academic research, the Center aims to stimulate public discourses on topics with high societal relevance for the region and Europe. The vision of the Center is to promote freedom of research and to ensure the necessary prerequisites for innovative, intellectual and scientific development. The Center strives to strengthen the transnational and regional scientific cooperation on a range of socially pressing issues with relevance for the Humanistic and Social Sciences."

=== Rectors ===
Heads of the university hold the title of Rector (Rektor) and are currently elected to four-year terms. There have been 16 rectors (14 men and 2 women) since the university's establishment in 1973.

- 1973–1976 - Zorislav Sapunar
- 1976–1978 - Zoran Kompanjet
- 1978–1980 - Josip Deželjin
- 1980–1984 - Slobodan Marin
- 1984–1986 - Predrag Stanković
- 1986–1989 - Mirko Krpan
- 1989–1991 - Petar Šarčević
- 1991–1993 - Elso Kuljanić
- 1993–1998 - Katica Ivanišević
- 1998–1999 - Danilo Pavešić
- 1999–2000 - Josip Brnić
- 2000–2009 - Daniel Rukavina
- 2009–2017 - Pero Lučin
- 2017–2025 - Snježana Prijić-Samaržija
- 2025–2026 - Davor Vašiček
- 2026–present - Goran Hauser

Source: List of rectors at the University of Rijeka website.

== Student projects ==
Students at University of Rijeka work on various fields, and majority of projects are founded by Student council of Uniri.

Biggest examples are Onetius, Student Day Festival, Riteh Racing Team, NeuRi and Debate League of Rijeka.

== International rankings ==
University rankings

Global – Overall
- QS World: 801-1000 (2021)

The university not ranked by QS, ranking 1066 by USN, and 1329 by CWUR. It is not listed for THE.

== See also ==
- List of institutions of higher education in Croatia
