= International Graduate Business School Zagreb =

Coordinates: 45°48′54″N 16°00′43″E

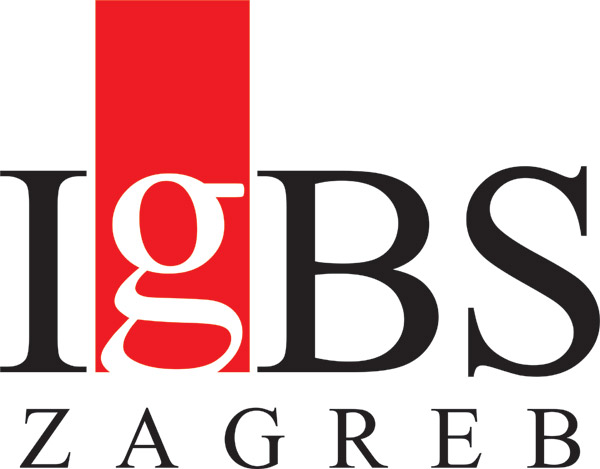
- Type: Private business school
- Affiliations: The Institute of Economics, Zagreb
- Dean: Dr. Zlatan Fröhlich
- Location: Zagreb, Croatia
- Website: IgBS Zagreb

International Graduate Business School (IGBS) Zagreb is designed to meet the need for management education in Croatia and the region. IGBS Zagreb offers dual MBA/M.Sc degree in partnership with Kelley School of Business, Indiana University.

A Croatian public research center in economics, The Institute of Economics, Zagreb, founded IGBS Zagreb as a private business school in 2003 with the support of a grant from the U.S. Department of State.

== Academics ==
=== Dual degree M.B.A. /M.Sc. in Strategic Management ===
IGBS Zagreb conducts Dual Degrees, MBA/M.Sc. Program in Strategic Management in Croatia in partnership with Kelley School of Business, Indiana University. Kelley School of Business faculty teach most of the courses, joined by research faculty from The Institute of Economics, Zagreb. Graduates receive a Bologna - compliant degree from IGBS Zagreb, in addition to an M.Sc. degree in Strategic Management from Kelley School of Business.

=== Kelley Direct M.Sc. in Global Supply Chain Management ===
IGBS Zagreb graduates can obtain further specialization through an online M.Sc. Programs at Kelley School of Business (Kelley Direct programs). Tracks available are Global Supply Chain or Finance. Graduates receive an M.Sc. degree in Finance or Global Supply Chain from Kelley School of Business.

== Notable alumni ==
- Sandro Baričević, Business Communications Director Europe, The Coca-Cola Company
- Luka Mađerić, Head of Human Rights Office, Government of the Republic of Croatia
- Tomislav Krmpotić, Second Vice-President, American Chamber of Commerce in Croatia
- Ninoslav Kikaš, Head of Finance, Esplanade Zagreb Luxury Hotel Esplanade Zagreb Hotel
- Janko Štefanek, Executive Director of Financial Services, Genera Inc., for the development and production of pharmaceuticals
- Igor Čupić, member of the Board, Armex gradnja d.o.o., Zagreb-based construction & real estate firm
- Marija Vojnović, director of Euroconsilium d.o.o., Zagreb-based EU funds consultancy

== See also ==
- List of institutions of higher education in Croatia
