= Županja Gymnasium =

Coordinates: 45°04′20″N 18°41′31″E

- Županja; Croatia

Information
- Type: Public
- Established: 1954
- Principal: Ivica Živković
- Enrolment: 480
- Language: Croatian
- Campus: Urban
- Website: gimnazija-zupanja.skole.hr

Županja Gymnasium (Croatian: Gimnazija Županja) is a secondary school (gymnasium) situated in Županja, Croatia. The school was established by the authorities of the Socialist Republic of Croatia in 1954. Gymnasium Županja carries the educational programs of general secondary school, science, and language direction. Classes are taught in Croatian.

== Overview ==
The school is an important educational institution for the town of Županja, neighboring or nearby municipalities of Štitar, Bošnjaci, Gradište, Babina Greda and the Cvelferija region. In 2020 the school received 40,000 Croatian kuna from the Marin Čilić Fund for the equipment for the chemistry lab.

The School cooperate with the local social security office, local voluntary centre in Županja and with the B.a.B.e. organization from Zagreb in organization of cultural activities and holiday gifts for youth with fewer opportunities.

== Success ==
After the school year 2023/24, 59 graduates of this gymnasium enrolled at an institution of higher learning in Croatia, or 93.65% of students who took up the nationwide Matura exams. The most common destinations for these students were the University of Osijek faculties of economics, electrical engineering, computing and IT, humanities and social sciences, law, and civil engineering and architecture.
