= Ministry of Finance (Croatia) =

Ministry of the Croatian government

Ministry of Finance Ministarstvo financija

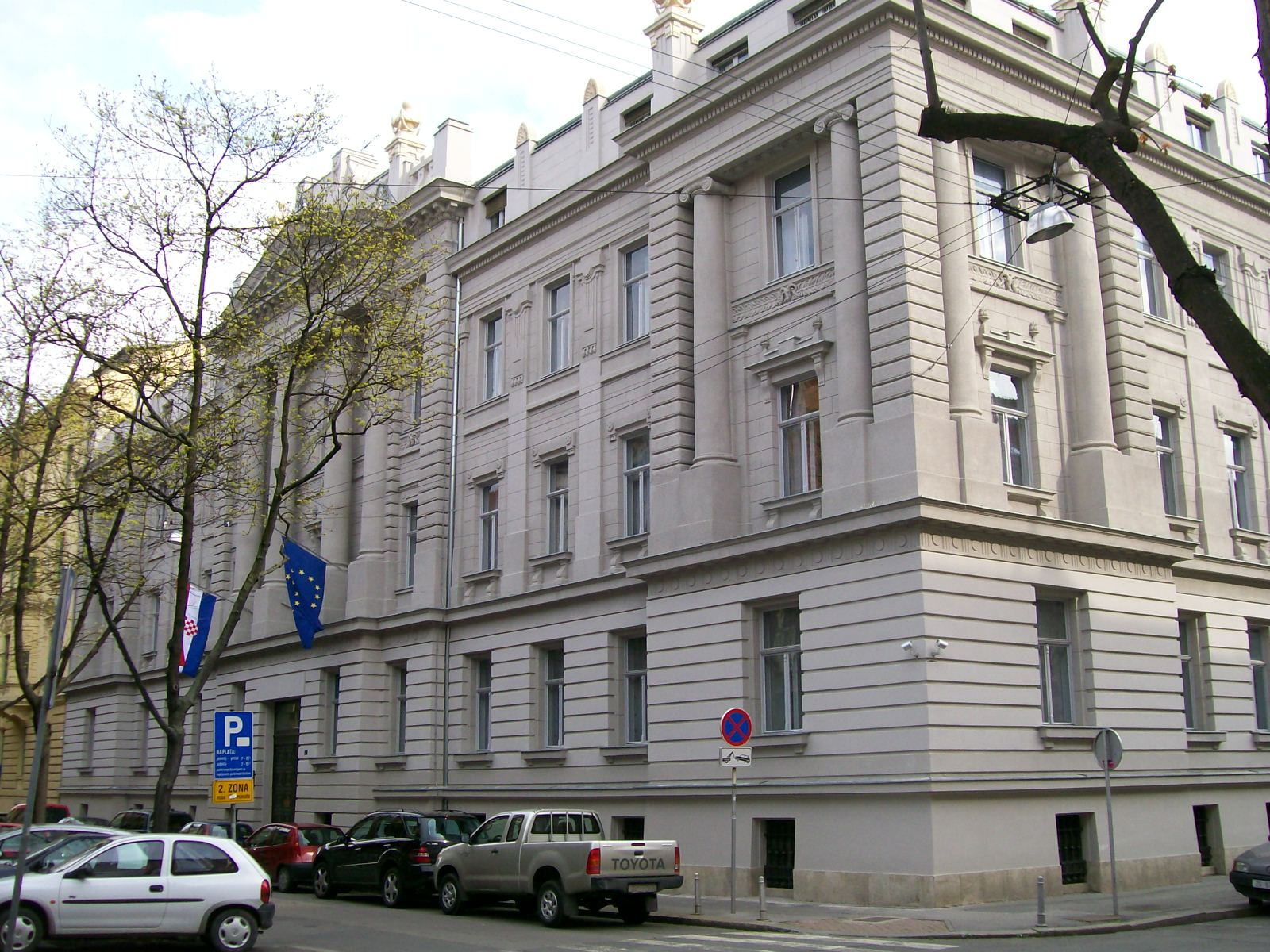
- Headquarters of the Ministry of Finance

Ministry overview
- Formed: 31 May 1990; 36 years ago
- Type: Ministry in the Government of Croatia
- Jurisdiction: Croatia
- Headquarters: Katančićeva 5, Zagreb, Croatia
- Employees: 8976 (2025)
- Budget: €2.27 billion (2025 budget)
- Website: mfin.gov.hr

Minister
- Currently: Tomislav Ćorić since 29 January 2026

The Ministry of Finance of the Republic of Croatia (Croatian: Ministarstvo financija) is the ministry in the Government of Croatia which is in charge of state finances and the budget.

== List of ministers ==
Minister	Party	Term start	Term end	Days in office
Marijan Hanžeković	HDZ	25 July 1990	17 July 1991	357
Jozo Martinović	Ind.	31 July 1991	12 August 1992	378
Zoran Jašić	HDZ	12 August 1992	7 July 1994	694
Božo Prka	HDZ	7 July 1994	11 September 1997	1,162
Borislav Škegro	HDZ	11 September 1997	27 January 2000	868
Mato Crkvenac	SDP	27 January 2000	23 December 2003	1,426
Ivan Šuker	HDZ	23 December 2003	28 December 2010	2,562
Martina Dalić	HDZ	29 December 2010	23 December 2011	359
Slavko Linić	SDP	23 December 2011	6 May 2014	865
Boris Lalovac	SDP	14 May 2014	22 January 2016	618
Zdravko Marić	Ind.	22 January 2016	5 July 2022	2,356
Marko Primorac	Ind.	15 July 2022	29 January 2026	1,294
Tomislav Ćorić	HDZ	29 January 2026	Incumbent	187

== Organization ==
The Ministry has a total of 8976 staff (as of 2025), and it is split into 3 administrations:

- Ministry of Finance proper
- Tax Administration
- Customs Administration

Ministry of Finance proper
Department	Croatian language	Staff
Cabinet of the Minister	Kabinet Ministra	14
General Secretariat	Glavno tajništvo	132
Institute for Macroeconomic Analysis and Planning	Zavod za makroekonomske analize i planiranje	43
Directorate for European Union and International Financial Relations	Uprava za Europsku Uniju i međunarodne financijske odnose	84
Directorate for the Economy and Financial System	Uprava za gospodarstvo i financijski sustav	64
Directorate for State-Owned Enterprises, Concessions and State Aid	Uprava za trgovačka društva u državnom vlasništvu, koncesije i državne potpore	82
Directorate for State Treasury Processes Related to the Preparation of the State Budget and Support to the Financing System of Local and Regional Self-Government Units	Uprava za procese državne riznice koji se odnose na pripremu državnog proračuna te podršku sustavu financiranja jedinica lokalne i područne (regionalne) samouprave	69
Directorate for State Treasury processes related to the execution and single account of the budget	Uprava za procese državne riznice koji se odnose na izvršavanje i jedinstveni račun proračuna	78
Directorate for State Treasury Processes Related to State Accounting and the Information System	Uprava za procese državne riznice koji se odnose na državno računovodstvo i informacijski sustav	88
Public Debt Management Directorate	Uprava za upravljanje javnim dugom	68
Directorate for Financial Management, Internal Audit and Supervision	Uprava za financijsko upravljanje, unutarnju reviziju i nadzor	101
Independent Sector for Appellate Administrative Procedure	Samostalni Sektor za drugostupanjski upravni postupak	49
Independent Sector for Audit Supervision	Samostalni Sektor za nadzor revizije	26
Financial Inspectorate	Financijski inspektorat	68
Office for the Prevention of Money Laundering	Ured za sprječavanje pranja novca	53
Total		1021

Tax Administration
Department	Croatian language	Staff
Central Office	Središnji ured	459
Zagreb Regional Office	Područni ured Zagreb	938
Office for Large Taxpayers	Ured za velike porezne obveznike	110
Osijek Regional Office	Područni ured Osijek	199
Pazin Regional Office	Područni ured Pazin	292
Rijeka Regional Office	Područni ured Rijeka	312
Split Regional Office	Područni ured Split	419
Zadar Regional Office	Područni ured Zadar	166
Zagreb County Regional Office	Područni ured Zagrebačka županija	243
Bjelovar Regional Office	Područni ured Bjelovar	87
Čakovec Regional Office	Područni ured Čakovec	91
Dubrovnik Regional Office	Područni ured Dubrovnik	133
Karlovac Regional Office	Područni ured Karlovac	85
Koprivnica Regional Office	Područni ured Koprivnica	91
Krapina Regional Office	Područni ured Krapina	88
Sisak Regional Office	Područni ured Sisak	101
Slavonski Brod Regional Office	Područni ured Slavonski Brod	85
Šibenik Regional Office	Područni ured Šibenik	109
Varaždin Regional Office	Područni ured Varaždin	123
Vukovar Regional Office	Područni ured Vukovar	109
Gospić Regional Office	Područni ured Gospić	47
Požega Regional Office	Područni ured Požega	48
Virovitica Regional Office	Područni ured Virovitica	64
Total		4399

Customs Administration
Department	Croatian language	Staff
Director's Office	Ured ravnatelja	8
Customs System Sector	Sektor za carinski sustav	120
Excise and Special Taxes Sector	Sektor za trošarine i posebne poreze	44
Supervision Sector	Sektor za nadzor	27
Sector for intelligence, analytics and risk management	Sektor za obavještajne poslove, analitiku i upravljanje rizicima	54
Mobile Unit Sector	Sektor za mobilne jedinice	320
Finance Sector	Sektor za financije	55
Sector for Human Resources Management, Training and Legal Affairs	Sektor za upravljanje ljudskim potencijalima, izobrazbu i pravne poslove	47
Sector for European Affairs, International Cooperation and European Union Projects	Sektor za europske poslove, međunarodnu suradnju i projekte Europske Unije	17
Information System	Sektor za informacijski sustav	84
Sector for Internal Audit, Supervision and Control	Sektor za unutarnju reviziju, nadzor i kontrolu	44
Sector for Strategic Planning and Public Relations	Sektor za strateško planiranje i odnose s javnošću	13
Zagreb Regional Customs Office	Područni carinski ured Zagreb	752
Rijeka Regional Customs Office	Područni carinski ured Rijeka	409
Osijek Regional Customs Office	Područni carinski ured Osijek	789
Split Regional Customs Office	Područni carinski ured Split	773
Total		3556

== Officials ==
Currently serving officials at the Ministry:

=== Minister ===
- Tomislav Ćorić, Deputy Prime Minister of the Republic of Croatia and Minister of Finance

=== State Secretaries ===
- Stipe Župan
- Tereza Rogić Lugarić
- Matej Bule

=== Directors of departments ===
- Leon Žulj, Director of the Directorate for State-Owned Enterprises, Concessions and State Aid (Ravnatelj Uprave za trgovačka društva u državnom vlasništvu, koncesije i državne potpore)
- Hrvoje Radovanić, authorized to perform the duties of the Director of the Public Debt Management Directorate (ovlašten za obavljanje poslova ravnatelja Uprave za upravljanje javnim dugom)
- Ana Zorić, authorized to perform the duties of the Director of the Directorate for the Economy and Financial System (ovlaštena za obavljanje poslova ravnatelja Uprave za gospodarstvo i financijski sustav)
- Hana Zoričić, authorized to perform the duties of the Director of the Directorate for State Treasury Processes Related to the Preparation of the State Budget and Support to the Financing System of Local and Regional Self-Government Units (ovlaštena za obavljanje poslova ravnatelja Uprave za procese Državne riznice koji se odnose na pripremu državnog proračuna te podršku sustavu financiranja jedinica lokalne i područne (regionalne) samouprave)
- Danka Mihaljević, authorized for the processes of the State Treasury related to the execution and single account of the budget (ovlaštena za procese Državne riznice koji se odnose na izvršavanje i jedinstveni račun proračuna)
- Ivana Radeljak Novaković, authorized to perform the duties of Director of the Institute for Macroeconomic Analysis and Planning (ovlaštena za obavljanje poslova ravnateljice Zavoda za makroekonomske analize i planiranje)
- Doria Petričević Štefanac, authorized to perform the duties of Director of the Directorate for European Union and International Financial Relations (ovlaštena za obavljanje poslova ravnatelja Uprave za Europsku uniju i međunarodne financijske odnose)
- Željko Sarić, authorized to perform the duties of chief financial inspector (ovlašten za obavljanje poslova glavnog financijskog inspektora)
