= Academic grading in Croatia =

Academic grading in Croatia is regulated by the Ministry of Science, Education and Sports.

== Grading scale (numerical and descriptive) ==
In Croatia the following official grade scale applies to elementary school, high school and university students:

1 (0–49%)	Insufficient (nedovoljan)
2 (50–59%)	Sufficient (dovoljan)
3 (60–74%)	Good (dobar)
4 (75–89%)	Very good (vrlo dobar)
5 (90–100%)	Excellent (odličan in schools, izvrstan at universities)

The grade 1 (nedovoljan) is a failing grade, while grades 2 through 5 are passing grades.

Many teachers use minus and plus symbols as grade modifiers. For example, "−5" denotes a grade slightly lower than "excellent", while "+4" denotes a grade slightly higher than "very good". Half-grades such as "4/5" are also used. These modifiers are unofficial and do not appear in final grade reports.

== Conduct grading ==
Conduct (vladanje) is graded on a 3-point descriptive scale:

- Poor (loše)
- Good (dobro)
- Exemplary (uzorno)

In practice, most students receive "exemplary" conduct grades. Conduct grade does not count towards the grade point average.

== Grade point average ==
Grade point average (GPA) is calculated as the arithmetic mean of all numerical grades:

- 1.00–1.99 Insufficient
- 2.00–2.49 Sufficient
- 2.50–3.49 Good
- 3.50–4.49 Very good
- 4.50–5.00 Excellent

== Grade inflation ==
A significant grade inflation has been observed in primary education and, to a lesser degree, in secondary education. In the 2008/09 school year, almost 168,000 out of 365,000 elementary school students were graded "excellent" by their grade point average. Parent pressure on teachers has been identified as a major cause. In the school year 2023/2024, 46% of elementary school students passed with a GPA in the range of "excellent". Although the country has seen a drop in students passing with a GPA of 5.0, the steady increase of high-grade students has put pressure on more prestigious highschools (especially in the capital of Zagreb) to further restrict enrollment by introducing preliminary exams.

A national exam was introduced in 2022 for all students to take in year 8, throughout March. These exams were then expanded to include year 4 students in 2024. Although national exams have been viewed as a solution to grade inflation, the exams do not impact grade averages or highschool enrollment as of 2024, which they have been criticised for by teachers.

== Sources ==
- Pravilnik o načinu praćenja i ocjenjivanja učenika u osnovnoj i srednjoj školi (in Croatian)
- Zakon o odgoju i obrazovanju u osnovnoj i srednjoj školi (in Croatian)
- Različiti sustavi ocjenjivanja i usporedne ljestvice (in Croatian)
- Neopravdan sat »ruši« uzorno vladanje (in Croatian)
- Inflacija petica: U osnovnim školama odlikaša je više od 50 posto (in Croatian)
- Inflacija petica: više od 80 posto đaka je odlično (in Croatian)
- Umjesto talenata, odlikaši bez znanja pune gimnazije (in Croatian)
