= Business School PAR =

Business school PAR
- Visoka poslovna škola PAR
- Type: Private Business School
- Established: 2007
- Dean: PhD Gordana Nikolić
- Students: Up to 90 per annum
- Location: Rijeka, Croatia
- Website: www.par.hr/en

Business School PAR is a business school in Primorje-Gorski Kotar County, Rijeka, Croatia. They offer a Bachelor of Arts degree in Business Management.

== History ==
Business Academy Rijeka (Poslovna Akademija Rijeka - P.A.R. ltd) was founded in 2007. It had been offering a Business management programme for three generations of students. PAR was legally constituted as a private body of law until its business expanded, so an institution for higher education was formed.

== Professional sportmen/women students ==
The Sports Academy pilot project started in 2008. Several Croatian athletes have been enrolled as PAR students, including Ana Jelušić (skiing), Matea Ferk (skiing), Ivan Mance (football), Sandro Sukno (waterpolo), Luka Marić (football), Ivana Kalebić (volleyball), Ivan Krapić (waterpolo), Ronald Rodić (basketball), Luka Tandara (handball) Timna Tičić (tennis), Natko Rački (football manager), among others.

== Post-degree Competencies ==
Business Management consists of economic studies as well as logistics studies through mandatory modules. Students gain knowledge in mathematics, foreign languages, IT, etc. Beyond the theory, PAR students learn practical skills such as project management, methods of studying, people management, and English language.

== International cooperation ==
PAR has collaborated on different projects with universities in Serbia, Montenegro and Bosnia and Herzegovina. Business Academy Rijeka, in cooperation with Iacocca Institute on Lehigh University, hosted in March 2012 the International Leadership Conference (PILC) about female leadership. Soon after this event the Dean of the Business School PAR PhD Gordana Nikolić participated in the support program for women entrepreneurs of southwestern Europe which took place in May 2012 in Israel.

PAR continues to collaborate with Iacocca Institute by being recruitment center for West Balkan in international program for future leaders called Global Village.

PAR co-hosted The European SME Week about Lifelong Learning in the Development of Small and Medium Enterprises on September 27, 2012.

== Charity Event "Students for Students" ==
The Business School PAR organized a charity event on December 6, 2012 to collect money for the home improvement of orphaned youngsters. The Football club Rijeka, as well as Handball club Zamet offered their collaboration and donated undersigned items that were sold in the auction later the same evening. Croatian soap opera Lara's choice donated several pieces of clothing which were also sold in the auction. All money raised, as well as home improvement material was given to the Ivana Brlic Mazuranic orphanage. Charity event, supported by great athletes and sponsors, has continued on April 11, 2013 with repainting the inner walls of Ivana Brlic Mazuranic orphanage.
