= University of Novo Mesto =

Private university in Slovenia

- Univerza v Novem mestu
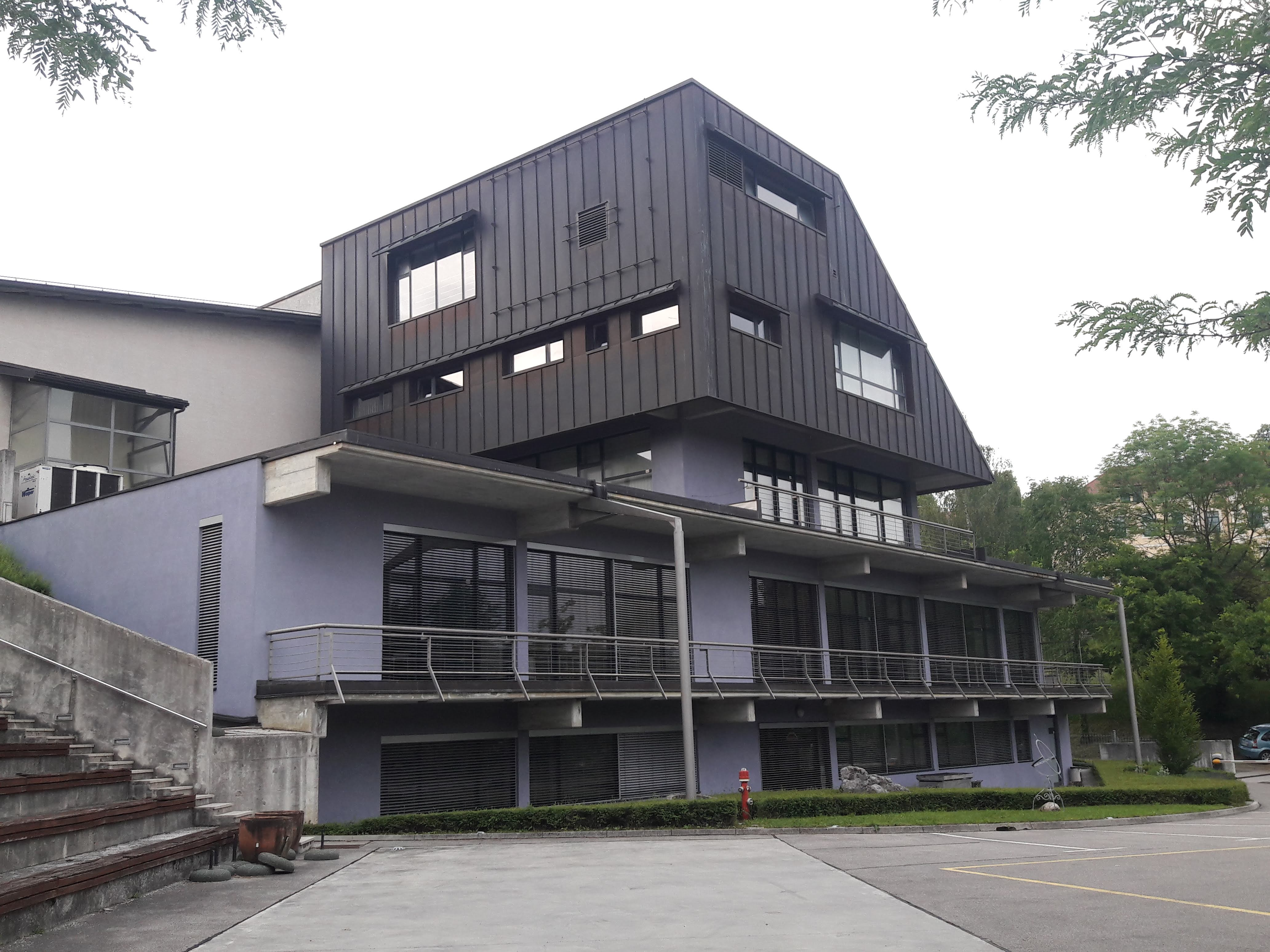
- Established: 2017; 8 years ago
- Rector: Marjan Blažič
- Students: 600
- Location: Novo Mesto, Slovenia; 45.804°N 15.163°E
- Website: https://uni-nm.si/en/

The University of Novo Mesto (UNM, Slovene: Univerza v Novem mestu) is a private university in Slovenia. It is located in the town of Novo Mesto.

== Organization ==
Faculties:

- Faculty of Economics and Informatics
- Faculty of Business and Management Sciences
- Faculty of Health Sciences
- Faculty of Mechanical Engineering
