= Vigilare =

Ultra-conservative advocacy group

- Founded: 2011 in Croatia
- Headquarters: Grahorova 4, Zagreb, Zagreb, Croatia
- Method: Internet activism, online petitions
- Website: vigilare.info//

Vigilare is a conservative Catholic Association in Croatia, founded in 2011, which mainly deals with family issues in its work.

== History ==
Vigilare started its activities as a virtual community and later they registered as an association in Croatia. Vigilare mostly deal with family issues.

The founder of the Vigilare association is Dr. sc. Vice John Batarello. Since 2008, he has led or participated in numerous public actions in Croatia, such as the actions "I was an embryo", "Kulfest", the arrival of Dr. Judith Reisman in Croatia, the state referendum on the family, etc.

Vigilare is a pro-life group.

During the mandate of Croatian Minister of Education Jovanovic, Vigilare campaigned against the introduction of health education in Croatian schools.

Glavasevic, a member of parliament in Croatia, stated at a press conference in 2021 that, according to a report by the European Parliamentary Forum for Sexual and Reproductive Rights, the Croatian associations ''U ime obitelji'', Vigilare and Ordo iuris received more than 707 million US dollars from private donors from several countries, including the US and Russia.

== Court proceedings ==
In 2013, Vigilare announced that due to the referendum on marriage and his public comments on YouTube, Don Damir Stojic, the student chaplain, had received death threats.

Dr. Batarelo, president of the Vigilara Association, announced the filing of criminal charges against the person who called for the murder of the student chaplain.

In 2019, Vigilare legally lost the case against the former president of the Republic of Croatia, Ivo Josipović, due to discrimination against members of the Catholic faith. Former Croatian President Josipović stated that Croatia is a secular state, not a Catholic Jamahirija.

In the verdict, the Supreme Court established that Josipović did not discriminate against members of the Catholic faith with the statement "Croatia is a secular state. It is not a Catholic Jamahiriya".

In 2020, Vigilare reacted to the decision of the Croatian Constitutional court which allowed same-sex couples to adopt children and declared such a decision illegal.

In 2023, the Zagreb County court ruled that Vigilare discriminated against and harassed LGBTIQ persons and their families through the initiation of the "Protect children from homo adoption" petition and publications on websites.

In 2022, the Supreme court ruled that the petition launched by the Vigilare association entitled: "Stop homo-propaganda on state television. Let's stop fake rainbows, protect children and families!" encouraged discrimination and harassment of LGBTIQ persons and their families.

== Public actions ==
In 2013, Vigilare called on the Minister of Education, Science and Sports Zeljko Jovanovic to resign due to irregularities in the decision to introduce the Health Education Curriculum in primary and secondary schools in Croatia without a public discussion.

In 2014, Vigilare called out the shoe store Shooster for offensive marketing and called for a boycott of their products.

In 2014, Vigilare launched a public campaign: ''Christmas without a discount'', with which they requested the removal of the English abbreviation of the word Christmas (Xmas) from the streets and squares in Croatia. Vigilare believes that using the English word 'Xmas' pushes religious symbols out of public space.

In 2015, Vigilare requested a public apology from Croatian Prime Minister Milanovic for misusing the term "Holy Trinity" in political speech.

In 2016, Vigilare called for the withdrawal of the advertisement called "Take it off" and demanded an apology from the Croatian Lottery to all women in Croatia for insulting and humiliating women.

The Court of Honor of the Croatian Association of Market Communication Societies, after considering the complaint of the Vigilare association, decided that it found nothing objectionable in the advertisement of the Croatian Lottery and that the recipients of the messages were not exposed to inappropriate content that 'discriminates' on the basis of gender.

In 2016, Vigilare organized the TradFest 2016 Festival of Traditions and Conservative Ideas in Zagreb, which was attended by American Cardinal Raymond Leo Burke, Dobrovic, Minister of Environmental protection and Energy, Stier, Minister of Foreign Affairs and other politicians and religious officials.

In 2017, representatives of the ProLife.hr initiative and the Vigilare association submitted 168,561 signatures to the petition for the legal protection of unborn life in the Croatian Parliament. The petition with citizens' signatures was received by Zeljko Reiner, Vice president of the Croatian Parliament.

In 2017, the Vigilare Association asked Croatian Prime Minister Plenkovic not to ratify the Istanbul Convention, due to the mention of gender identities in the document.

Vigilare submitted their "legal opinion" to the Ministry of Demography and Family.

In 2017, the Vigilare Association protested on its website due to the tasteless marketing campaign of the Croatian National Theater in Zagreb and disturbing billboards.

In 2017, Vigilare regretted the European Parliament's decision to invite EU members to ratify the Council of Europe Convention on preventing and combating violence against women and domestic violence. Vigilare called on the Croatian Government and Parliament not to ratify the convention.

In 2017, Vigilare requested a public apology from Ivo Josipović, the former president of Croatia, for the insult he caused to the citizens of Croatia by commenting that Croatia is a secular state, not a Catholic Jamahiriya.

In 2018, Vigilare sent an open letter to the Minister of Science and Education, Blazenka Divjak, asking for an answer to the question of whether she would allow the use of a picture book about same-sex families in Croatian kindergartens and schools.

In 2018, the Vigilare asked the Croatian Prime Minister Plenkovic to dismiss the Minister of Science and Education Blazenka Divjak, because she supported the entry of the picture book 'My Rainbow Family' into Croatian kindergartens and schools.

In 2018, Vigilare reacted on FB to the Zombie walk in Zagreb, when several hundred people, fans of horror films, walked around the city disguised as zombies. They said it was violence against children.

In 2019, Vigilare called the Administrative court's decision according to which same-sex couples can become foster parents a provocation. The Administrative Court annulled the decision of the Ministry of Demography that a homosexual couple cannot foster a child.

In 2019, Vigilare criticized the Lidl store in a public statement for selling inappropriate products to children.

In 2020, immediately after the attempted attack on the Croatian government building, Vigilare organized the first public gathering in front of the government building.

In 2021, Vigilare supported the initiative of the ''Hrvatski Suverenisti'' Croatian parliamentary party and their parliamentary representative Zekanovic to collect the signatures of the parliamentary representatives so that the proposal for the Law on the Protection of Life could be put on the agenda of the Parliament.

The Vigilare Association launched a petition in 2021 due to a possible decision by the Ministry of Family and Minister Aladrovic to allow same-sex couples to foster or adopt children. According to media reports, the Ministry appealed the administrative court's decision on the right of same-sex couples to foster or adopt children, but will respect the final court ruling.

In 2022, Vigilare called out Zagreb Mayor Tomislav Tomasevic and the city administration on Facebook for prohibiting them from placing flags around the city ahead of the March for Life, even though they had previously received permission from the city.
