= Dragan Primorac =

Croatian physician and geneticist

PhD Dragan Primorac
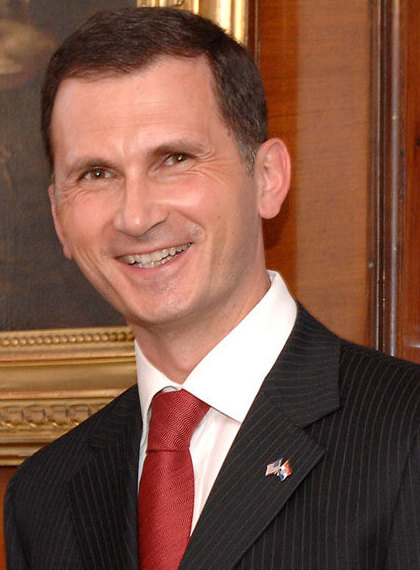

Minister of Science, Education and Sports
- In office 23 December 2003 – 2 January 2009
- Prime Minister: Ivo Sanader
- Preceded by: Vladimir Strugar (Minister of Education and Sports); Gvozden Flego (Minister of Science and Technology)
- Succeeded by: Radovan Fuchs

Personal details
- Born: 7 June 1965 (age 61) Banja Luka, SR Bosnia and Herzegovina, SFR Yugoslavia
- Party: Independent
- Other political affiliations: Croatian Democratic Union (2007–2009); League of Communists of Yugoslavia (1982–1990)
- Spouse: Jadranka Primorac

Dragan Primorac /ˈdrɑːɡən ˈpriːməˌræts/ (born June 7, 1965) is a Croatian politician, physician, geneticist, and forensic scientist. He served as Minister of Science, Education and Sports in the 9th and 10th government of Croatia under HDZ's Ivo Sanader, and was a presidential candidate in the 2009 and 2024 elections.

== Early life and career ==
Primorac was born in Banja Luka in SR Bosnia and Herzegovina of SFR Yugoslavia. His family is originally from the region between Ljubuški and Vrgorac. Soon they moved to Split, where Primorac spent his childhood, graduated from elementary and high school.

== Education ==
Primorac graduated from the University of Zagreb, Split Medical School, in 1991. The same year he emigrated to the United States where he worked several years as a postdoctoral fellow and later also as an instructor at the University of Connecticut Medical School. He defended his doctoral dissertation, entitled "Osteogenesis Imperfecta as a Result of Faulty Processing of Messenger RNA", in 1997 at the University of Zagreb, Medical School.

== Politics ==
Primorac became a politician as a member of the Croatian Government, serving as the Minister of Science, Education and Sports between 2003 and 2009. He completed his first term (2003–2007) without any party affiliation. According to the International Republican Institute survey of October 1, 2007, he was rated as the most successful minister in the Croatian Government with 31% approval rate.

Primorac was at first not a member of a political party, before he joined the Croatian Democratic Union (HDZ) in September 2007. At the Croatian parliamentary election, 2007, he ran as a candidate of HDZ in the 11th electoral unit (the so-called Croatian diaspora list), and their list won almost 82% of the votes. After elections he did not join the Parliament and was named a minister again in January 2008. Because of the proposed reduction of the budget for the Ministry of education, science and sports, and especially due to the canceling the project of free textbooks and free transport for pupils of primary and secondary schools in Croatia he announced his resignation. He resigned on July 7, 2009. Soon afterward he made an unprecedented move by giving up his seat in the Croatian parliament to the Party. The Party then gave the seat to Goran Marić, who replaced Primorac while he was minister. On November 9, 2009, Primorac formally announced his candidacy in the Croatian presidential election, 2009. He was subsequently summarily removed from HDZ membership. In the first round of the election he won 5.93% of the vote and did not qualify for the second round.

=== Ministerial career ===
Primorac entered the first government of Ivo Sanader in December 2003. Primorac's commitment to build a society based on knowledge and to acknowledge the key role of education and science has been reflected in a growing investment into the education and science system, with the budget increase between 2004 and 2009 totaling 56% (€600,000,000). At the same time an additional sum (approx. €600,000,000) has been approved and used for building university campuses in Croatia. Within the education and science system, over 9,900 new jobs have been created since 2004 in order to ensure optimum implementation of reforms. All together it represents the biggest investment in the education and science sector as well as the largest creation of jobs in this sector in the recent history of Croatia.

In 2005, the Ministry of Education under Primorac started a project called the Croatian national education standard for elementary schools ("H.N.O.S.") which was supposed to be applied in all schools in 2006, but was applied during 2007. He also completed one of the most important projects during his term: Implementation of two foreign languages in Croatian primary schools.

Primorac proposed the National Programme of Measures for the Implementation of Compulsory Secondary Education to Croatian Parliament, based on Article 80 Constitution of the Republic of Croatia. During its session on June 21, 2007, Parliament adopted the program as the optimal model to solve the problems of poor education structure of Croatian population, and the frequency of early school dropouts.

Within the National Programme of Measures for the Implementation of Compulsory Secondary Education, a series of incentives, such as free textbooks, free transport and housing in student dormitories have been offered to make secondary education accessible to everyone. In 2006, Minister Primorac introduced the concept of free textbooks and announced that all pupils of elementary schools and pupils of the first class of secondary schools will have their schoolbooks funded by the Government. On May 12, 2009, Primorac announced that the Ministry reached a deal with the publishers of schoolbooks in Croatia so that the Government would pay for the schoolbooks of all classes (including second, third and fourth grades of secondary schools), for the sum of 440 million kunas, the same prices as the year before.

During 2008 he introduced for the first time in Croatia, independent external evaluation of education "National exams", while in 2009, he launched the State Matura (national standard tests equal to S.A.T.) for all students who are planning to continue their education in Universities.

Under his leadership, the Ministry also applied the Bologna process in the academic year 2005/2006.

Within the area of a science project for the return of Croatian scientists from abroad was started and since 2004 over 120 scientists have returned to Croatia. The programme Unity through Knowledge yielded approximately 40 competitive research projects with returnee and Diaspora (Croatian professionals working abroad) participation.

On June 16, 2009, weekly magazine Nacional announced that "Primorac will soon become the first minister in the history of Croatia to resign at the peak of his political career". On July 1, 2009, he resigned together with Ivo Sanader, although the media had reported him planning to resign several weeks prior to the abrupt departure of Sanader. Primorac also gave back his Parliament seat to the party, and was replaced by Goran Marić. In the newly formed government of Jadranka Kosor, he was replaced by his former state-secretary Radovan Fuchs, who reversed Primorac's free schoolbook policy in his first week in office.

The award for numerous efforts made in the Croatian educational system is the survey by Newsweek that rated Croatia 22nd in education, ahead of 12 countries from the G20 group.

=== 2024–25 presidential election ===
Primorac was a candidate in the 2024–25 Croatian presidential election. Although he had been endorsed by his former party, the Croatian Democratic Union, he still officially ran as an independent. In his YouTube advertisement, Primorac stated that he was running on a platform of restoring civility and bringing back moderation to Croatian political discourse, and has indirectly attacked the current president, Zoran Milanović, on his lack of inhibition and political correctness.

In the first round of the election on 29 December, Primorac placed second with 19% of the vote, but was able to compete in a runoff scheduled in January 2025 after Zoran Milanović narrowly failed to win an outright majority. On 12 January 2025, Primorac lost the runoff to Milanović, getting approximately 25.31% of the votes, making Milanović the president once again.

== Career in science and education ==
Primorac serves as an adjunct professor at Eberly College of Science, The Pennsylvania State University, and Henry C. Lee College of Criminal Justice and Forensic Sciences, University of New Haven, and as a professor at School of Medicine, University of Split and School of Medicine, University of Osijek as well as at Department of Biotechnology, University of Rijeka, in Croatia. In 2016 he was appointed as a visiting professor at the College of Medicine and Forensics, Xi’an Jiaotong University, People’s Republic of China. Primorac is a fellow of the American Academy of Forensic Science, a member of the American Society of Human Genetics, Honorary member of International Crime Analysis Association and the Croatian Society for Osteogenesis Imperfecta.

Primorac was a long-time member of the Government Office for Detained and Missing Persons and served as a member of the Council for Technology at the previous Ministry of Science and Technology of the Republic of Croatia before 2003 when he became a government minister. For two years (2000–2002) he was the main coordinator of an international project supported by Promega, which brought together six European countries with the aim of applying and analyzing new DNA methods for the purpose of identification. Primorac is the founder of the American-European School for Clinical and Forensic Genetics which is being held bi-annually in Croatia and co-founder of the International Society of Applied Biological Sciences. Moreover, for the years 2003, 2005, 2011, 2013, 2015, 2017, 2019, 2022, 2024, the U.S. Mayo Clinic, is actively participating in the work of this Congress as a co-organizer (until now about 6500 scientists from nearly 78 countries have participated in the work of the Congress. Since 2007 ISABS (International Society of Applied Biological Sciences) become the organizer of the Congress, whose official journal is Croatian Medical Journal.

He authored close to 400 scientific papers and abstracts in clinical and molecular medicine, genetics, forensic science, population genetics, genetic legacy of Homo sapiens and education, science and technology policy. Currently he has a particular interest in metabolic bone and cartilage disorders, sports medicine as well as in personalized and regenerative medicine. He is the author of the original results on the genetic origins of the Europeans with a special focus on the South-Eastern European population. Several renowned media outlets, both electronic and print, have reported on the results of his research work, such as the New York Times, USA Today, Chicago Tribune, Hartford Courant, JAMA, Lancet, Science, NBC, Channel 8 (Connecticut TV Station), etc. Primorac worked at the Clinic for Pediatrics and served for several years (1996–2001) as the head of the Laboratory for Clinical and Forensic Genetics, both at Split Clinical Hospital. He was also director of the Polyclinic " Holy Spirit II " in Zagreb while currently, he is President of the Board of Trustees of the St. Catherine Hospital. During 1992/1993 Primorac and Simun Andelinovic founded the Laboratory for Clinical and Forensic Genetics at the Clinical Hospital in Split. That laboratory was the first in the region where identification of war victims discovered in mass graves by DNA technology took place. For their efforts, they won a joint Award of the City of Split in 1995.

In 2005. Primorac played a role in the founding process of the initially private Media university in Split, that subsequently relocated to the inland city of Koprivnica. Media university merged with the University of applied sciences in Varaždin, starting to form the only public university in the Central and Northern Croatia alongside the University of Zagreb. As of 2022, University North is known as the fifth largest university in Croatia with some 5500 students in two university centres, Koprivnica and Varaždin. In 2015. Primorac visited the newly formed University North, stating that the study conditions at the university are at the level of some of the best universities in the world.

Primorac received 21 domestic and international awards including Mary E. Cowan Outstanding Service Award awarded by the American Academy of Forensic Sciences, The Young Investigator Award of the American Society for Bone and Mineral Research, the Michael Geisman Fellowship Award of the Osteogenesis Imperfecta Foundation, the Life Time Achievement Award by the Henry C. Lee College of Criminal Justice and Forensic Sciences, The Award of the Italian Region Veneto for Special Achievements in Promoting Science in the EU, the University of New Haven’s International Award for Excellence, Presidential Award by the President of the International Association of Forensic Sciences for his contribution given to forensic sciences. In 2015 he was awarded The State Science Award (the most prestigious national recognition by the Parliament of the Republic of Croatia) for his outstanding contribution to a biomedical science and received "The Order of Croatian Star with the Effigy of Ruđer Bošković" decoration, from the President of the Republic of Croatia for his extraordinary achievements in science. In June 2018., the President of the Republic of Croatia awarded Primorac with the Order of Ante Starčević for his extraordinary achievements in the field of science, education, and politics, as well as for his contributions to the development of the Republic of Croatia.

== Sports ==
In 1987 he founded the Taekwondo club "Kocunar". In 2004, he was awarded the Silver Plaque of the European Olympic Committee for his contribution to the development of Sports. He is an inductee of the Taekwondo Hall of Fame, based in the United States.

Government offices
Preceded by Vladimir Strugar as Minister of Education and Sports	Minister of Science, Education and Sports; December 23, 2003 – July 6, 2009	Succeeded by Radovan Fuchs
Preceded by Gvozden Flego as Minister of Science and Technology	Minister of Science, Education and Sports; December 23, 2003 – July 6, 2009	Succeeded by Radovan Fuchs
