= Nedjeljko Perić =

Croatian engineering professor (born 1950)

- Born: May 14, 1950; Dubravica, Bosnia and Herzegovina
- Education: B.Sc., M.Sc., and Ph.D. degree
- Occupation: Engineering professor

Nedjeljko Perić (born May 14, 1950) is a Croatian engineering professor.

== Early life and education ==
Perić was born in Dubravica, Bosnia and Herzegovina. He graduated at the Faculty of Electrical Engineering in Zagreb in 1973, where he also received his PhD in 1989.

== Career ==
After graduation he worked at the Rade Končar Electrical Engineering Institute in Zagreb. From 1993 he worked at the Faculty of Electrical Engineering and Computing in Zagreb, where he is a tenured professor (since 1997), head of the Department of Control and Computer Engineering (1996–1998, and 2000–2004) and dean (since 2010). His work deals with the automation of plants and processes.

== Academy membership ==
Since 1998 he is a full member of the Croatian Academy of Engineering. In 2007 he was awarded the National Award for Science. He was a member (1995–2005) and the president (2000–2005) of the National Committee for Electrical Engineering and Computing, member of the Regional Council for Technical Sciences (1994–2000, 2005-), and member of the Science Council (1994–2000) at the Ministry of Science and Technology of the Republic of Croatia.
