= Danilo Blanuša =

Croatian Serb mathematician, physicist, and engineer (1903–1987)

Danilo Blanuša (7 December 1903 – 8 August 1987) was a Croatian mathematician, physicist, engineer and a professor at the University of Zagreb.

== Biography ==
Blanuša was born in Osijek, Austria-Hungary (today Croatia). He attended elementary school in Vienna and Steyr in Austria and gymnasium in Zagreb as well as at the Real Gymnasium Osijek. He studied engineering in both Zagreb and Vienna and also mathematics and physics. His career started in Zagreb, where he started to work and lecture. His student Mileva Prvanović completed her doctorate in 1955, the first in geometry in Serbia. Blanuša was the dean of the Faculty of Electrical Engineering, Zagreb in the 1957–58 school year. He received the Ruđer Bošković prize in 1960. He died in Zagreb.

== Mathematics ==
In mathematics, Blanuša became known for discovering the second and third known snarks in 1946 (the Petersen graph was the first), triggering a new area of graph theory. The study of snarks had its origin in the 1880 work of P. G. Tait, who at that time had proved that the four color theorem is equivalent to the statement that no snark is planar. Snarks were so named later by the American mathematician Martin Gardner in 1976, after the mysterious and elusive object of Lewis Carroll's poem The Hunting of the Snark.

Blanuša's most important works were related to isometric immersions of pseudo-Riemannian manifolds in differential geometry. In particular, in his most cited work he has exhibited an embedding of a hyperbolic (Lobachevsky) two-dimensional plane into 6-dimensional Euclidean space and another construction, for all natural numbers $n\geq 2$, of an $n$-dimensional hyperbolic space into $6n-5$-dimensional Euclidean space. In an earlier work he has exhibited embeddings of $n$-dimensional hyperbolic spaces into a separated (infinite-dimensional) Hilbert space. His other important works are in the theory of the special functions (Bessel functions) and in graph theory. Some of his results are included in the Japanese mathematical encyclopedia Sugaku jiten in Tokyo, published by Iwanami Shoten in 1962.

== Physics ==
His works were mostly related to the theory of relativity. He discovered a mistake in relations for absolute heat Q and temperature T in relativistic phenomenological thermodynamics, published by Max Planck in Annalen der Physik in 1908.

- Q0 and T0 are the corresponding classical values, and a=(1-v_{2}/c_{2})^{1/2}

                 in the relation     →   Q=Q0a, T=T0a 
                 really should be    →  Q=Q0/a, T=T0/a

This correction was published in Glasnik, the journal relating to mathematics, physics and astronomy in 1947 in the article "Sur les paradoxes de la notion d'énergie". It was rediscovered in 1960, and the correction is still wrongly attributed to H. Ott in the mainstream scientific literature.

== See also ==
- Blanuša snarks
