= Physics of Metals and Metallography =

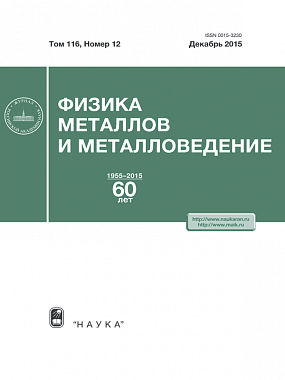
- Discipline: Solid-state physics
- Language: English, Russian
- Edited by: Vladimir V. Ustinov

Publication details
- Publisher: Maik Nauka/Interperiodica (Russia)
- Frequency: Monthly
- Impact factor: 1.319 (2021)

Standard abbreviations
- ISO 4: Phys. Met. Metallogr.

Indexing
- CODEN: PHMMA6
- ISSN: 0031-918X (print); 1555-6190 (web)
- LCCN: 58004924
- OCLC no.: 01645143

Links
- Springer homepage (2006-present); Pleiades homepage (1996-present)

The Physics of Metals and Metallography (Phys. Met. Metallogr.) [Russian: Физика металлов и металловедение (ФММ), or Fizika metallov i metallovedenie (Fiz. Met. Metalloved.)] is a peer-reviewed Russian scientific journal concerning metals and metal alloys. It was established in 1955 by the Academy of Sciences of the Soviet Union. English translations of recent volumes are available through Springer Science+Business Media. Starting in January 1992, the Russian Academy of Sciences and Pleiades Publishing, Inc. began a joint venture to create English translations of the journal articles.

Published in Russian by Nauka, it received a positive review as showing the contributions of Soviet research in metal science. The journal is associated with the Institute of Metal Physics, which is the base institution for the journal.
