= Mileva =

Mileva is a Serbo-Croatian given name and Bulgarian surname. Notable people with the name include:

== Given name ==
- Mileva Filipović (1938–2020), Montenegrin sociologist
- Mileva Marić (1875–1948), Serbian mathematician and first wife of Albert Einstein
- Mileva Prvanović (1929–2016), Serbian differential geometer
- Mileva Roller (1886–1949), Austrian painter in the Viennese Secession movement

== Surname ==
- Elisaveta Mileva (born 1934), Bulgarian gymnast
- Leda Mileva (1920–2013), Bulgarian writer, translator and diplomat
- Mina Mileva, Bulgarian director and animator
- Ralitsa Mileva, (born 1993), Bulgarian artistic gymnast
