= Vojislav Bego =

Croatian electrical engineer

Vojislav Bego (August 3, 1923 – May 29, 1999) was a Croatian electrical engineer.

He was born in Split. He graduated in 1946 at the Technical Faculty in Zagreb. Worked in the company Rade Končar (1946-1961), where he led the project for manufacturing high-voltage instrument transformers with open core. In 1958 he started teaching at the Faculty of Electrical Engineering, where he received his PhD in 1965, and professorship in 1968. In the period 1970-1972 he served as the faculty dean.

Bego published numerous papers on laboratory and test facilities used in the electrical engineering, high-voltage measurement equipment, instrument transformers, measurement procedures, theory of errors, and the voltage scale as a measuring instrument. Bego gained reputation based on his work achieved in the field of fundamental electrical measurements. The highlight of his success in this field is the creation of Voltage balance that led to the internationally accepted corrections of voltage unit. The authored textbook Mjerenja u elektrotehnici ("Measurements in electrical engineering"; 1968, 8 editions), Mjerni transformatori ("Instrument transformers"; 1977), Naponska vaga ("Voltage scale"; 1986). He was a full member of the Croatian Academy of Sciences and Arts since 1991, winner of the Nikola Tesla Award (1964) and the Croatian National Science Award (1997).

He died in Zagreb.
