= Slavko Krajcar =

Croatian electrical engineer

- Born: 14 January 1951
- Died: 18 June 2021
- Citizenship: Croatian
- Scientific career
- Fields: Electrical engineering, Energy, Power Systems
- Institutions: University of Zagreb

Slavko Krajcar (14 January 1951 - 18 June 2021) was a Croatian electrical engineer, former dean of Faculty of Electrical Engineering and Computing and member of Governance of the Croatian Academy of Engineering.

== Early life, education and career ==
He was born in Krajcar Breg, municipality Žminj, Croatia. He attended high school in Pula and went on to graduate from the Faculty of Electrical Engineering and became an electrical engineer in 1973. He received his PhD in 1988, and became full professor in 2002. He had been working on University of Zagreb, Faculty of Electrical Engineering and Computing, Department of Energy and Power Systems for his entire career, more than 46 years.

After serving as an assistant dean in the period 1991-1991 and as a vice dean between 1996.-98, he served, as well, as the dean of Faculty of Electrical Engineering and Computing in two terms, in the period 1998–2002, and as a head of the Department of energy and Power Systems from 2002 to 2006 year.

== Memberships ==
He was active member of many professional and other organisation, a full member and member of the management board of the Croatian Academy of Engineering, the president of the Croatian Lighting Society, active member of CIGRE, CIRED, IEEE, and others.

In addition to his profession, he was also very active in culture, for two terms he was the president of the society "Čakavian Parliament", and among other things, he published two collections of his poems.

Prof. Krajcar was one of the leading figures in making Croatian Energetic Strategy (which the Parliament accepted in 2010) and the Energetic Efficiency Strategy (2008), his expertise made a significant contribution to Croatian politics in the energy sector, and he was one of the pioneers of the energy transition in Croatia. He did not refuse invitations to many interviews, radio and TV shows and round tables.

== Awards ==
Slavko Krajcar received numerous prestigious awards and recognitions for his exceptional scientific work, including golden plaque "Josip Lončar" from the University of Zagreb's Faculty of Electrical Engineering and Computing for many years of dedicated teaching and research, special award for the reconstruction and development of the University Computing Center (SRCE), the HO CIRED award for great professional contribution to the development of electricity distribution (lifetime achievement award), the HRO CIGRE award for overall contribution to the power industry in the Republic of Croatia (lifetime achievement award) and also the ‘’Nikola Tesla’’ Croatian IEEE Section award for outstanding contribution to science, education and the profession in the field of electrical engineering and computing and significant achievements in electrical engineering and information technology.

He died in Fuškulin, Croatia at the age of 71.
