= Hrvoje Požar =

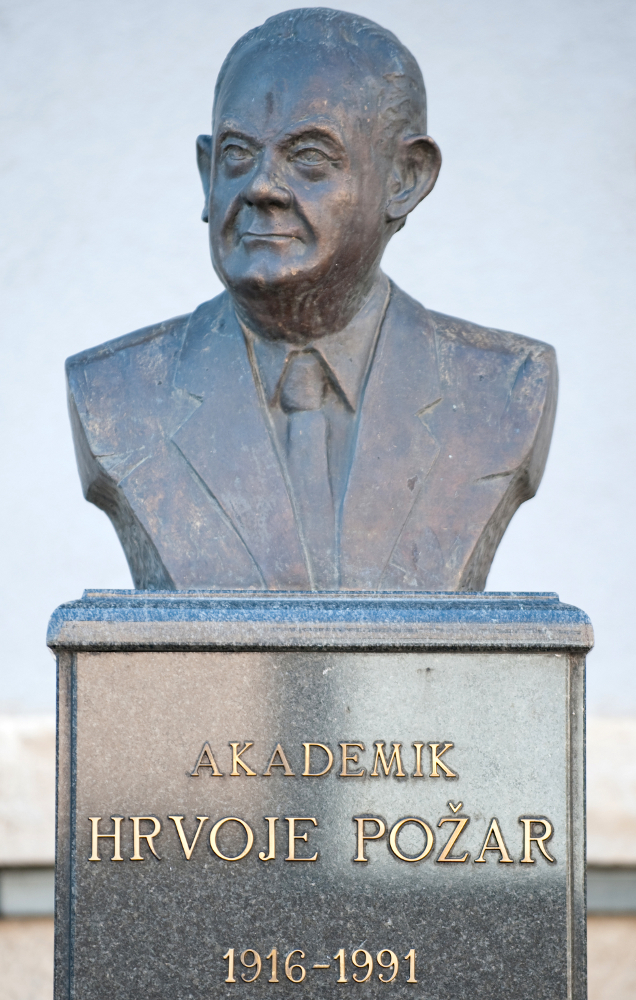
Hrvoje Pozar

Hrvoje Požar (5 July 1916 – 30 June 1991) was a Croatian engineer, member of the Croatian Academy of Sciences and Arts.

Požar was born in Knin, where he finished elementary school. He attended high school in Šibenik and went on to graduate from the Faculty of Electrical Engineering of the University of Zagreb and became an electrical engineer. After graduation, he worked on a variety of managerial positions in power.

In 1950, Požar began to teach part-time at the Technical Faculty of the University of Zagreb and in 1955 he gained his doctorate in technical sciences with his thesis on hydro power plants. In 1961 he became a full-time professor at the Faculty of Electrical Engineering of the University of Zagreb and an associate member of the then Croatian Academy of Sciences and Arts four years later. He served as a dean of the Faculty of Electrical Engineering of the University of Zagreb in two terms (1960-1962 and 1968-1970), and as a vice rector of the University of Zagreb from 1970 to 1972. In 1984 Požar was awarded with IEEE Centennial Medal. He was also editor in chief of the country's Technical Encyclopedias from 1976 to 1991. Until his death he performed the duty of the Secretary General of the Croatian Academy of Arts and Sciences.

Požar died in Zagreb at the age of 74. The Croatian Government has named its Energy Institute after him in his honor. The Croatian Energy Association also has an eponymous Foundation.
