= Pavo Barišić =

Croatian philosopher and politician (born 1959)

Minister of Science and Education
- In office 19 October 2016 – 9 June 2017
- President: Kolinda Grabar-Kitarović
- Prime Minister: Andrej Plenković
- Preceded by: Predrag Šustar
- Succeeded by: Blaženka Divjak

Personal details
- Born: 9 September 1959 (age 66) Gornja Dubica, PR Bosnia and Herzegovina, FPR Yugoslavia (modern Bosnia and Herzegovina)
- Party: Croatian Democratic Union
- Occupation: Philosophy of Law and Politics

Pavo Barišić (born 9 September 1959) is a Croatian philosopher and politician who served as Minister of Science and Education in the Cabinet of Andrej Plenković from 2016 until 2017. His scholarly work focuses on philosophy of law, political philosophy and democracy, history of philosophy, and bioethics. He is a member of Croatian Democratic Union.

From 2015 to 2025, Barišić served as Secretary General of the International Pan-European Union, and on 14 February 2025 he was elected its President. For thirteen years, from 2003 to 2016, he served as President of the Croatian Pan-European Union, a position he has held again since 2022.

Barišić is a full member of the European Academy of Science and Arts, headquartered in Salzburg, Austria. He is also a full member of the Academy of Sciences and Arts in Bosnia and Herzegovina (IANUBiH).

== Biography ==
Pavo Barišić graduated from the University of Zagreb, earning a degree from the Faculty of Law in 1982 and from the Faculty of Humanities and Social Sciences in 1983. He obtained a PhD from the University of Augsburg in 1989 with the dissertation Welt und Ethos: Hegels Stellung zum Untergang des Abendlandes [World and Ethos: Hegel’s Position on the Decline of the West].

Since 1986, he has been a research fellow at the Institute of Philosophy in Zagreb, where he served as Director from 1991 to 2001. He was a full professor at the University of Split, where he headed the Department of Philosophy from 2005 to 2013. From 2019, he has been a full professor at the University of Zagreb. He served as Dean of the Faculty of Croatian Studies from 2019 to 2021 and as Head of the Department of Philosophy and Cultural Studies from 2022 to 2024.

Barišić was editor-in-chief of the philosophical journals Filozofska istraživanja and Synthesis Philosophica. From 2007 to 2009, he served as President of the Croatian Philosophical Society.

From 2014 until 2016, he served as President of the Croatian Humboldt Club, and from 2021 to 2025 as its Vice President. In 2002–2003, he was a visiting professor at Kwansei Gakuin University in Nishinomiya, Japan, where, together with Hideki Mine and Masakatsu Fujita, he prepared a thematic journal issue on Philosophy in Japan.

In 2015, Barišić received the Award for Scientific Excellence from the Institute of Philosophy. In 2018, he received recognition from the Humboldt Foundation for research and international collaboration, as well as a Special Recognition from the Rector for his contribution to and promotion of the University of Split. In 2022, he received an award for scientific publications with high international visibility from the Faculty of Croatian Studies, University of Zagreb.

From 2004 to 2006 he served as Deputy Minister at the Ministry of Science, Education and Sports, where he was Head of the Operational Staff for Implementation of the Bologna Reform and the first President of the Steering Board of the Agency for Science and Higher Education.

On 19 October 2016, Barišić was appointed Minister of Science and Education in the Cabinet of Andrej Plenković. His mandate ended on 9 June 2017, following a reshuffle of the governing coalition, when responsibility for the Ministry of Science and Education was transferred to the Croatian People's Party. Under the coalition agreement, Barišić was offered the post of Minister of Labour and Pension System, which he declined. Two months later, when asked by journalists whether he regretted that Barišić was no longer a minister, Prime Minister Andrej Plenković stated that the decision had been Barišić’s own and that he had been offered a ministerial position: "He could have been a minister if he had wished. In the configuration of the new parliamentary majority, he had the opportunity to serve as a minister in the government. He declined, but he has my support. We remain in communication.“

== Philosophy ==
=== World and Ethos ===
The main topic of the book Welt und Ethos (1992) is Hegel's understanding of the twilight of Western spiritual development. The book analyses the transition from the culmination of absolute idealism to the nihilistic eclipse of European metaphysics. Its inquiry focuses on the concept of the world as human ethos – understood as one’s place of being, dwelling, home, oikoumene, or inhabited earth. In this context, the study elucidates Hegel's reinterpretation of the teleological order of events in world history.

The book concludes with Hegel’s well-known parable of the spirit as a seed, through which the ambiguous and dialectical nature of his philosophy becomes apparent: "He has shown that the Western spiritual life has reached its maturity. Thereafter, the ripened seed must fall, decay, and decline. Yet Hegel's position differs fundamentally from the nihilism that followed it; he does not consider only one aspect of the completion of spirit in the world. Development does not end in the mere ruin of thousands of years of spiritual labour. From the ripened fruit arises a new seed, a new principle, and a new life."

The philosopher Erwin Hufnagel observed that the study "presents all the essential components of Hegel's philosophy" and "takes into account the relevant secondary literature with rare systematic rigour and impressive powers of differentiation".

=== Ethical Ideal of Democracy ===
In a thematic issue on Democracy and Political Education, edited on the occasion of the 150th anniversary of John Dewey, Barišić identifies two key moral criteria "that point in a particular way to the superiority of the educational ideal within a democratic community over any other form of social integration. First, there is the degree of common interest realised within a society. Second, there is the principle of freedom to develop new common and individual interests in various forms of association."

The central question addressed is whether the ethical ideal of humanity can serve as a philosophical foundation for the evaluation and justification of democratic practices. The study argues that Dewey's emphasis on strengthening moral and participatory democratic ties within local communities explains why his model of democracy has found resonance within communitarian discourse. By stressing the substantive nexus between communication, community, and the common good, Dewey does not undermine liberal democracy; but rather enriches and strengthens it.

=== Deliberative Democracy ===
In his essay on Aristotle's thinking of the many and deliberation, Barišić argues against the elitist theories of democracy. He maintains that through the process of deliberation a group of individuals acquires a new quality; becoming a unity and a community. When citizens come together to deliberate and make collective decisions through thoughtful consideration, they attain a cognitive and moral level that surpasses that of a minority of experts or “honourable” individuals – the so-called elite – regardless of individual excellence.

Barišić elaborates five Aristotelian arguments in favour of democratic deliberation by the multitude: political, ethical, dianoetic, teleological, and collective responsibility. He concludes that Aristotle articulated foundational insights into deliberation and the advantages of the rule of the many that remain, in certain respects, valid today. Politics, therefore, is neither merely a procedural framework (as in Rawls) nor purely rational discourse (as in Habermas); rather, it is a matter of practical wisdom and judgment realised through deliberation by the many.

=== The Ideal of the Rule of the People ===
In The Ideal of the Rule of the People, Barišić re-examines key stages of the historical development of democracy. His reflections address the contemporary challenges confronting democratic governance across different regions of the world. Particular attention is devoted to global perspectives and to projections of both the opportunities and the risks that the democracy may face in the future.

He argues that the grand narrative of the rule of the people has not come to an end but continues in renewed forms. Democracy, he maintains, has not withered in ”post-democracy”. Despite observable deficiencies in political practice, the fundamental aims of freedom, equality, justice, human rights, and the common good continue to render democratic politics valuable and noble."

=== Cosmopolitan Democracy ===
The volume on Cosmopolitan Democracy, co-edited with Henning Ottmann, completes a trilogy on contemporary questions of the rule of the people. Barišić argues that, while cosmopolitan democracy represents a noble and compelling vision, it currently lacks feasible realisation within the constraints of contemporary realpolitik. At the same time, he points to the European Union as a historically unique political project and one of the most successful attempts to institutionalise human rights protection at the transnational level.

== Pan-European Views ==
As President of the International Pan-European Union, Barišić advocates freedom, peace, solidarity, and democracy as key priorities in addressing challenges to the international legal order, including power politics, territorial aggression, armed conflicts, trade and tariff disputes, and uncontrolled migration. Referring to the Pan-European motto in necessariis unitas, in dubiis libertas, in omnibus caritas, he emphasises the importance of solidarity within a democratically united Europe.

He stresses the protection of diversity of viewpoints and freedom of thought, particularly in controversial matters, and views tolerance as foundational to Europe’s high level of freedom of expression. Drawing on the thought of Richard Coudenhove-Kalergi, Barišić argues that the European Union emerged from a peace-oriented Pan-European philosophy and has developed into a significant global actor. He supports strengthening the EU’s common foreign and defence policies and highlights the importance of EU enlargement to south-eastern and eastern Europe.

== Publications ==
- Dijalektika običajnosti [The Dialectics of Social Morality]. Zagreb: Hrvatsko filozofsko društvo, 1988.
- Welt und Ethos: Hegels Stellung zum Untergang des Abendlandes [World and Ethos: Hegel's Position on the Decline of the West]. Würzburg: Königshausen & Neumann 1992.
- Filozofija prava Ante Starčevića [The Philosophy of Law of Ante Starčević]. Zagreb 1996.
- Metafizika ćudoređa [Metaphysics of Morals]. Immanuel Kant. Ed. Introduction. [Transl. by Dražen Karaman]. Zagreb: Matica Hrvatska 1999.
- Otvorena pitanja povijesti hrvatske filozofije [Open Issues of the History of the Croatian Philosophy]. Ed. Zagreb 2000.
- Demokracija i etika [Democracy and Ethics]. Ed. Zagreb 2005.
- Demokracija na prekretnici [Democracy at Crossroads]. Ed. Zagreb 2014.
- Deliberative Demokratie [Deliberative Democracy]. Ed. with Henning Ottmann. Baden-Baden: Nomos 2015.
- Ideal vladavine puka. Uvod u filozofiju demokracije [The Ideal of the Rule of the People. Introduction to the Philosophy of Democracy]. Zagreb/Split 2016.
- Demokratie und Öffentlichkeit [Democracy and the Public]. Ed. with Henning Ottmann. Baden-Baden: Nomos 2016.
- Kosmopolitische Demokratie [Cosmopolitan Democracy]. Ed. with Henning Ottmann. Baden-Baden: Nomos 2018.
- Ante Starčević: Ideali slobode i prava [Ante Starčević: Ideals of Freedom and Law]. Zagreb: Školska knjiga, 2022.
- Hrvatska paneuropska unija: Trideset i tri godine rada 1991. – 2024. [Croatian Pan-European Union: Thirty-Three Years of Activity, 1991-2024]. Edited with Mislav Ježić. Zagreb: Hrvatska paneuropska unija, 2024.
- Zlatko Posavac: Profesor estetike iz Kaptola (1931. – 2019.) [Zlatko Posavac: Professor of Aesthetics from Kaptol (1931-2019)]. Edited by Pavo Barišić. Zagreb: Naklada Slap, 2025.
