= Radovan Fuchs =

Croatian scientist and politician (born 1953)

PhD Radovan Fuchs
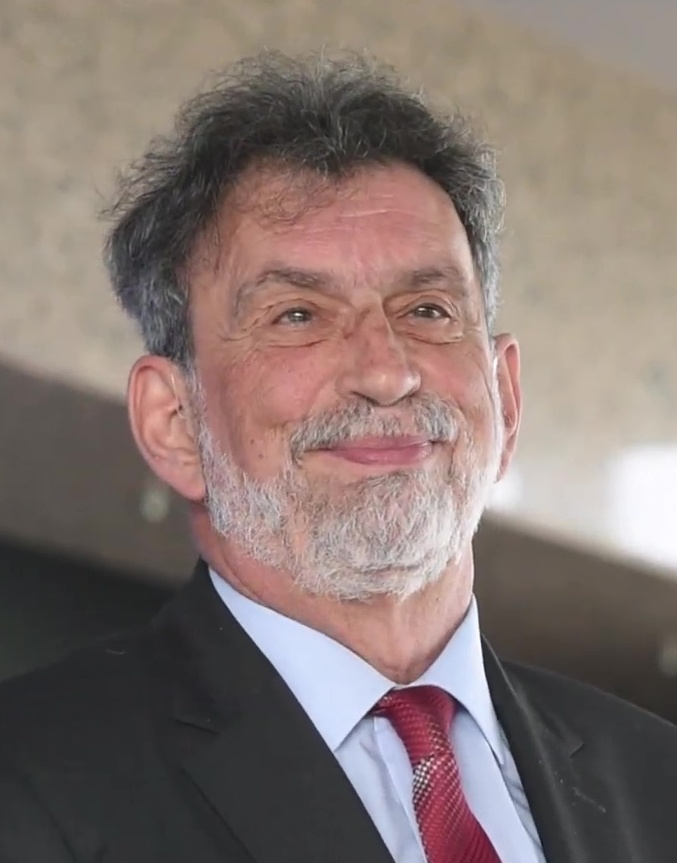
- Fuchs in 2022

Minister of Science, Education and Youth
- Incumbent
- Assumed office 23 July 2020
- Prime Minister: Andrej Plenković
- Preceded by: Blaženka Divjak

Minister of Science, Education and Sports
- In office 2 July 2009 – 23 December 2011
- Prime Minister: Jadranka Kosor
- Preceded by: Dragan Primorac
- Succeeded by: Željko Jovanović

Personal details
- Born: 5 September 1953 (age 73) Zagreb, PR Croatia, FPR Yugoslavia (modern Croatia)
- Party: Croatian Democratic Union
- Spouse: Maja Fuchs
- Children: 2
- Education: University of Zagreb; Uppsala University

Radovan Fuchs (born 5 September 1953) is a Croatian scientist and politician serving as Minister of Science and Education since 2020.

His paternal grandfather, Hinko, was a grain merchant who emigrated to Croatia from Germany, while his paternal grandmother, Eugenia, was from Hungary. The couple settled in the Croatian region of Slavonia. His maternal grandparents were from Vela Luka. Fuchs is of Croatian, Hungarian, and Jewish descent. His father converted to Catholicism, and Christmas and other Catholic holidays were always celebrated in the Fuchs household. He is a relative, on his father's side, of Croatian composer Vatroslav Lisinski. Fuchs graduated in 1979 from the Veterinary Faculty at the University of Zagreb. He received his master's degree in 1984 in the field of biomedicine. Fuchs obtained his PhD diploma in 1988 on the biomedical center at Uppsala University in Sweden. Dissertation which he defended was from the field of toxicology and pharmacology.
