= Vedran Mornar =

Croatian engineer and politician

Minister of Science, Education and Sports
- In office 18 June 2014 – 22 January 2016
- Prime Minister: Zoran Milanović
- Preceded by: Željko Jovanović
- Succeeded by: Predrag Šustar

Personal details
- Born: 29 May 1959 (age 67) Zagreb, PR Croatia, FPR Yugoslavia
- Party: Non-party
- Education: University of Zagreb (Faculty of Electrical Engineering and Computing)
- Occupation: Computers and information processing; Engineering management

Vedran Mornar (born 29 May 1959) is a Croatian engineer, university professor, former dean of the Faculty of Electrical Engineering and Computing and the full member of the Croatian Academy of Sciences and Arts. He formerly served as the Croatian Minister of Science, Education and Sports in the twelfth Government of the Republic of Croatia cabinet of Zoran Milanović from June 2014 to January 2016.

== Early life, education and career ==
Vedran Mornar was born in Zagreb in 1959, where he finished elementary and high school. In 1981, he graduated from the Faculty of Electrical Engineering, and gained his PhD in 1990. Since the beginning of 1982, he has been working at University of Zagreb, Faculty of Electrical Engineering and Computing, Department of Applied Computing. Since 2003 he is the full-time professor.

In the period from 2006 to 2010, he was the dean of the Faculty of Electrical Engineering and Computing. He was also vice dean for teaching and students between 2002 and 2006 and as a head of the Department of Applied Computing from 2018 to 2022 year. He was member of the Council of the Technical Area of the Senate of the University of Zagreb and the Rector's College in a wider composition, and a member of the Committee for Informatization of the University of Zagreb.

== Minister and memberships ==
Vedran Mornar was the Minister of Science, Education and Sports in the second part of twelfth Croatian Government, cabinet of Zoran Milanović from June 2014 to January 2016. During his mandate, he initiated a complete curricular reform that significantly contributed to the implementation of the largest project of informatization and digitalization of education in the Republic of Croatia called "e-Schools: Complete informatization of school business processes and teaching processes in order to create digitally mature schools for 21st century".

He became a member of the National Council for Higher Education in 2007 year and between 2009 and 2013, he was its president. He is the president of the Croatian Academy of Engineering in current mandate 2022-26. He is the president of Croatian Society for Information, Communication and Electronic Technology (MIPRO) He was the member of the Investment Committee of BICRO and Commission for the Implementation of the State Matura.

== Awards, projects and publishing ==
He received several awards, among them the Golden Plaque "Josip Lončar" for significant improvement of teaching and scientific research in the field of computing, and for particularly successful management of the Faculty during his dean's mandate when Faculty of Electrical Engineering and Computing was one of the first faculties in Croatia to introduce Bologna Process; then the Memorial of the Homeland War in Croatia; and the 'Fran Bošnjaković Award of the University of Zagreb, which is awarded for outstanding results in scientific, teaching and professional work and the promotion of the scientific discipline and profession.

He has conceived, designed and managed a number of important IT projects (eg the National Information System for applications to higher education institutions and applications and enrollments in secondary schools), and he also made a significant contribution to the introduction and implementation of the state matura.

Prof. Mornar published more than 30 scientific papers, and several books: "Programming", "Algorithms and data structures", "Operational research" and "Introduction to programming"
