= Predrag Šustar =

Croatian politician

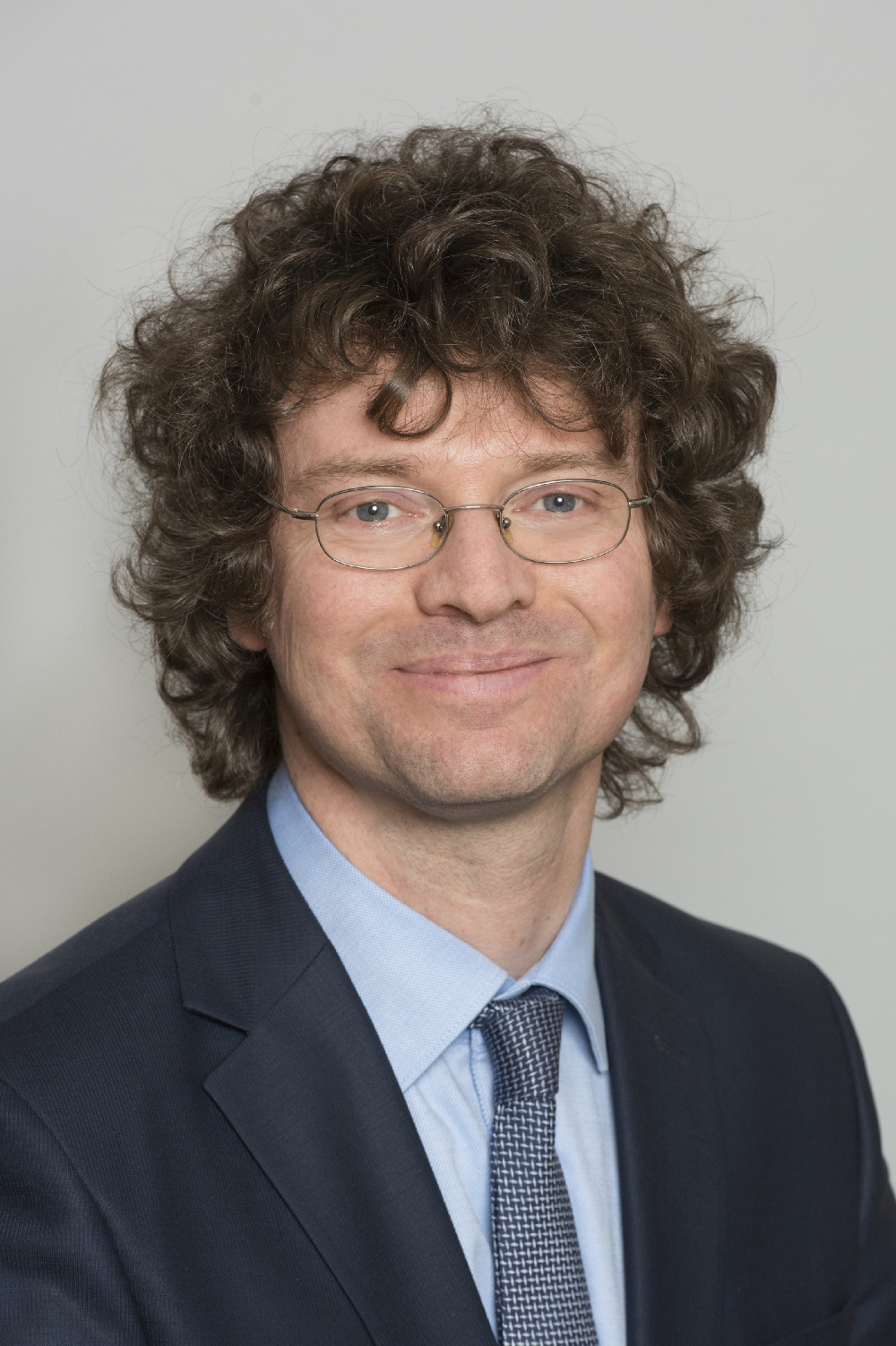

Minister of Science, Education and Sports
- In office 22 January 2016 – 19 October 2016
- President: Kolinda Grabar-Kitarović
- Prime Minister: Tihomir Orešković
- Preceded by: Vedran Mornar
- Succeeded by: Pavo Barišić

Personal details
- Born: 11 March 1970 (age 56) Rijeka, SFR Yugoslavia (now Croatia)
- Party: Croatian Labourists – Labour Party (prior to 2013); Croatian Democratic Union (2013-present)
- Spouse: Ira Rechner
- Children: Eva; Tara
- Education: University of Zagreb; University of Padua

Predrag Šustar (born 11 March 1970) is a Croatian philosophy professor and politician who served as Minister of Science, Education and Sports in the Cabinet of Tihomir Orešković from 22 January 2016 until 19 October 2016. He is member of the center-right Croatian Democratic Union.

== Early life and education ==
Predrag Šustar was born 11 March 1970 in Rijeka, where he finished elementary and high school. In 1989, he enrolled in the study of molecular biology at the Biology department of the Zagreb Faculty of Science from which he graduated in biological engineering on April 27, 1994. After graduation, Šustar enrolled in University of Pisa, but transferred in August 1995 to the Philosophy department of the University of Padua from which he graduated in philosophy on December 2, 1999. On January 14, 2000, he began his postgraduate studies on the same university. He gained his PhD on February 13, 2003.

== Career ==
From September 2 until December 15, 2001, Šustar was visiting scholar at the Columbia University. On December 15, 2003, he was elected to the academic title of docent from the history of philosophy and philosophy of science, and become employed at the Faculty of Humanities and Social Sciences of the University of Rijeka. From September 5 until June 4, 2007, he was Fulbright visiting scholar at the Columbia University, with his mentor for the project "Science and Human World View: Kant’s Teleology Account" being professor Philip Kitcher. From 2007 until 2009, Šustar served as Head of Department of Philosophy of the Rijeka Faculty of Humanities and Social Sciences, and from 2008 until 2010, Vice Dean for General Affairs of the same Faculty. On February 18, 2009, he was elected to the academic title of associate professor. From 2009 until 2015, he served two terms as Dean of the Rijeka Faculty of Humanities and Social Sciences. From March 1, 2015 until September 30, 2016, he worked as visiting professor in the doctoral programs of the Departments of Philosophy and Biology at the University of Padua.

== Politics ==
Šustar got enrolled in politics in 2013 when he ran as candidate for the mayor of Rijeka of the center-left Croatian Labourists – Labour Party. After he lost election to Vojko Obersnel, he left Labour Party and joined center-right Croatian Democratic Union. Šustar describes himself as "catholic, traditionalist, and demochristian".

== Views on evolution ==
In article "Science And Religion in the “Theory Of Natural Philosophy“ by Roger Joseph Boscovich", that Šustar wrote with his college Aleksandra Golubović and published in Rijeka theological journal in October 2012, he wrote: "It seems that so far the theory of evolution did not offer definitive solutions, which still leaves room for God as a designer. What, in other words, means that the option of God (as intelligent designer) remains open (ie, it is most likely)." He was publicly criticized by physicists Ivica Puljak (CERN) and Dejan Vinković.

== Curricular reform controversy ==
On May 25, 2016, head of the working group for the implementation of a comprehensive curricular reform, professor Boris Jokić and his team resigned citing political pressure from some members of the conservative Patriotic Coalition. Social Democratic Party of Croatia (SDP) called for Šustar's resignation. SDP member Sabina Glasovac, Vice-Chairwoman of the Committee on Education, Science and Culture of the Croatian Parliament, said that Šustar remained silent and that he was nothing more than a "formal minister" in an "incompetent government". This also triggered public outcry and launch of an online petition which was signed by more than 30,000 people in less than two days. Trade Union of Croatian Teachers, which represented 28.000 people, stated that they were "ready to organize a mass protest within three days if the government doesn't show a clear will to continue curricular reform." On May 27, 2016, minister Šustar held a press conference of which he stated that the reform would continue with or without Jokić and his team, while at the same time urging Jokić to consider the withdrawal of resignation. He also criticized the Working group for the delay of public debate because they failed to achieve the set goals within the due time. Šustar announced an independent international review of the reform at the end of the process of its creation and stated that he expected that the experimental phase of the reform would start as early as of 2017, or latest in 2018, as it was planned by the Working group. On May 31, 2016, President Kolinda Grabar-Kitarović issued an open letter in which she expressed her support to Boris Jokić urging him not to give up, and calling minister Šustar to allow the continuation of the preparation of curriculum reform and its implementation as soon as possible. Shortly afterward, Grabar-Kitarović held a meeting with minister Šustar and professor Jokić on which they all agreed that the reform should continue immediately. However, Jokić stated that he would not withdraw his resignation. President promised that she, as the guarantor of stability, was going to do anything to eliminate the political pressure on the reform process. On June 1, 2016, more than 40.000 people participated in the pro-reform "Croatia Can Do Better" protests that were held in Zagreb, Split, Križevci, Dubrovnik, Slavonski Brod, Osijek, Bjelovar, Rijeka, Virovitica, Poreč, Pula, Zadar, Korčula, Shanghai, Budapest, Berlin, Paris, London and New York City. At the end of the central protest held in Zagreb which was attended by more than 25,000 people, organizers read four requests to politicians: 1. Let experts and teachers continue their work independently, without pressure, political intervention and censorship; 2. Croatian Parliament has to express support to the reform, Boris Jokić and his team; 3. Croatian Parliament has to enact a resolution on education as a national strategic interest that would obligate all the future governments; 4. Croatian Government must provide money and autonomy to implement the reform, and protect it from sabotages or it has to resign.

== Memberships ==
Šustar is member of Croatian Philosophical Society, Croatian Society for Analytic Philosophy, International Society for the History of Philosophy of Science, Philosophy of Science Association, American Philosophical Association, International Society for the History, Philosophy, and Social Studies of Biology, and European Philosophy of Science Association.

== Personal life ==
He was married to architect Ira Rechner Šustar, with whom he has two daughters, Eva (b. March 29, 2001) and Tara (b. July 13, 2004).
