= Ministry of Science, Education and Youth (Croatia) =

Ministry of the Croatian government

Ministry of Science, Education and Youth Ministarstvo znanosti, obrazovanja i mladih
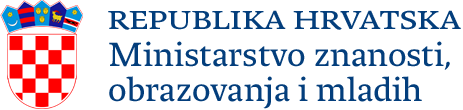

Ministry overview
- Formed: 31 May 1990; 36 years ago
- Type: Ministry in the Government of Croatia
- Jurisdiction: Croatia
- Headquarters: Donje Svetice 38, Zagreb, Croatia
- Employees: 418 (2025 estimate)
- Budget: €3.98 billion (2025 budget)
- Website: mzom.gov.hr

Minister
- Currently: Radovan Fuchs since 23 July 2020

The Ministry of Science, Education and Youth of the Republic of Croatia (Croatian: Ministarstvo znanosti, obrazovanja i mladih or MZOM) is the ministry in the Government of Croatia which is in charge of primary, secondary and tertiary education, research institutions, sports and youth.

== List of ministers ==
The ministry in its current form came into existence in 2003 in the Cabinet of Ivo Sanader I, resulting from the merger of the earlier Ministry of Science and Technology and the Ministry of Education and Sports. Both ministries had been originally formed in 1990, although they had changed forms and names several times during the 1990s. Below are lists of ministers of who headed both portfolios before the 2003 merger.

Ministers of Science (1990–2003)

From 1990 to 1992 the first three ministers held the title of Minister of Science, Technology and Informatics. In August 1992 the ministry was renamed Ministry of Science and Technology, which remained unchanged until 2003.

Minister	Party	Term start	Term end
Osman Muftić	Ind.	30 May 1990	31 July 1991
Ante Čović	Ind.	31 July 1991	15 April 1992
Jure Radić	HDZ	15 April 1992	12 August 1992
Ivo Sanader	HDZ	12 August 1992	7 January 1993
Branko Jeren	HDZ	23 February 1993	7 November 1995
Ivica Kostović	HDZ	7 November 1995	14 October 1998
Milena Žic-Fuchs	Ind. ^{[nb 1]}	22 February 1999	27 January 2000
Hrvoje Kraljević	HSLS	27 January 2000	30 July 2002
Gvozden Flego	SDP	30 July 2002	23 December 2003

Ministers of Education (1990–2003)

Between 1990 and 1993 the ministry was called Ministry of Education, Culture and Sports. In April 1993 it was renamed Ministry of Culture and Education. In October 1994 the ministry was split into the present-day Ministry of Culture and Ministry of Education and Sports (with Ljilja Vokić appointed as head of the latter). This form remained unchanged until 2003.

Minister	Party	Term start	Term end
Vlatko Pavletić	HDZ	30 May 1990	15 April 1992
Vesna Girardi-Jurkić	HDZ	15 April 1992	18 October 1994
Ljilja Vokić	HDZ	18 October 1994	4 March 1998
Božidar Pugelnik	HDZ	4 March 1998	5 October 1999
Nansi Ivanišević	HDZ	5 October 1999	27 January 2000
Vladimir Strugar	HSS	27 January 2000	23 December 2003

Ministers of Science, Education and Sports (2003–2016)

Minister	Party	Term start	Term end
Dragan Primorac	Ind. ^{[nb 2]}	23 December 2003	6 July 2009
Radovan Fuchs	HDZ	6 July 2009	23 December 2011
Željko Jovanović	SDP	23 December 2011	11 June 2014
Vedran Mornar	Ind. ^{[nb 3]}	11 June 2014	22 January 2016
Predrag Šustar	HDZ	22 January 2016	19 October 2016

Ministers of Science and Education (2016–2020)

Minister	Party	Term start	Term end
Pavo Barišić	HDZ	19 October 2016	9 June 2017
Blaženka Divjak	Ind.	9 June 2017	23 July 2020

Ministers of Science, Education and Youth (2020–present)

Minister	Party	Term start	Term end
Radovan Fuchs	HDZ	23 July 2020	Incumbent

=== Notes ===
nb 1. Milena Žic-Fuchs was appointed in 1999 as a non-party minister within the cabinet quota of HDZ.
nb 2. Dragan Primorac was originally appointed as a non-party minister in December 2003 in the HDZ-dominated Sanader cabinet. While in office he formally joined HDZ in September 2007. In July 2009 he resigned from his ministerial post to run in the December 2009 presidential election as an independent candidate. Because of his decision not to endorse HDZ's official party candidate Andrija Hebrang, his party membership was rescinded in November 2009.
nb 3. Vedran Mornar was appointed in 2014 as a non-party minister within the cabinet quota of SDP.
