= Nauka (publisher) =

Soviet and Russian academic publisher

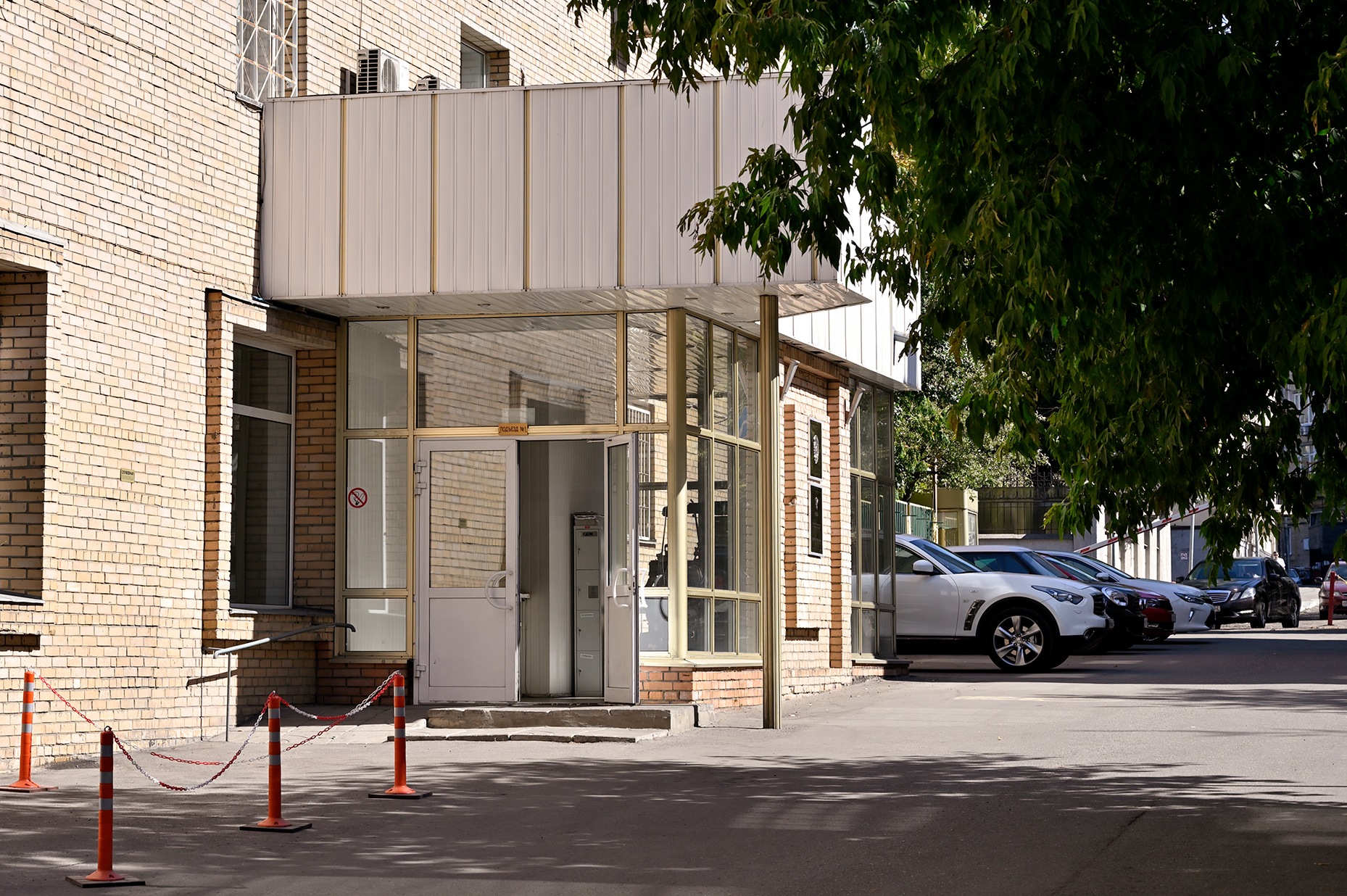
- Status: Active
- Founded: April 14, 1923; 103 years ago
- Founder: Alexander Fersman
- Country of origin: USSR → Russia
- Headquarters location: 6-1, Shubinsky lane, Moscow, 121099
- Distribution: Worldwide
- Key people: Nikolay Fedoseenkov (Acting Director); Тatyana Filippova (Chief Editor)
- Publication types: books, scientific journals
- Nonfiction topics: astronomy, biochemistry, biology, biophysics, chemistry, geological sciences, mathematics, physics
- Imprints: Nauka Publishers
- No. of employees: 970 (2017)
- Official website: www.naukapublishers.ru

Nauka (Russian: Наука, lit. 'Science') is a Russian publisher of academic books and journals. Established in the USSR in 1923, it was called the USSR Academy of Sciences Publishing House until 1963. Until 1934 the publisher was based in Leningrad, then moved to Moscow. Its logo depicts an open book with Sputnik 1 above it.

Nauka was the largest scientific publishing house in the USSR, as well as in the world at one time (in 1982). It was also notable for being the publisher of the USSR Academy of Sciences and its branches. In 1972 Nauka published 135 scientific journals, including 31 physical and mathematical, 24 chemical, 29 biological and five popular science journals: Priroda (Nature), Zemlya i Vselennaya (Earth and the Universe), Khimia i zhizn (Chemistry and Life), Kvant (Quantum), and Russkaya rech (Russian speech). The greater part of Nauka's production were monographs. It also published thematic collected works, reference books, textbooks and foreign literature in translation.

Structurally it was a complex of publishing institutions, printing and book selling companies. It had two departments (in Leningrad and Novosibirsk) with separate printing works, two main editorial offices (for physical and mathematical literature and oriental literature) and more than 50 thematic editorial offices. Nauka's main book selling company Akademkniga ("Academic Book" in English) had some 30 trading centers in all major cities of the country. The English distributor of the Nauka publications is MAIK Nauka/Interperiodica together with Pleiades Publishing and Springer Science+Business Media. Book series published by Nauka have included the Languages of Asia and Africa series.

== History ==
=== Background ===
The predecessor of the publishing house was the Printing House of the Academy of Sciences, where academic publications were printed from 1727. After 1917, it was called the Russian State Academic Printing House. The Publishing House of the Russian Academy of Sciences was founded in the USSR on April 14, 1923 and was initially based in Petrograd, the first director of the publishing house was academician Alexander Fersman, and the first publication released by the publishing house was the next volume of "Izvestiya of the Russian Academy of Sciences" published at the end of 1924. From August 1925, after the renaming of the Russian Academy of Sciences (1917—1925) to the Academy of Sciences of the USSR, the publishing house changed its name to the Publishing House of the Academy of Sciences of the USSR (ANI). The Charter of the AS USSR of 1927 determined that the director of the publishing house was elected from academicians by the General Assembly of the AS USSR. In 1930, the governing body of the publishing house became the specially created Editorial and Publishing Council (RISO) of the AS USSR, chaired by the permanent secretary of the AS USSR, this council was elected by the General Assembly of the AS USSR. In 1931, a distribution department was formed at the publishing house, which in 1938 was separated into an independent organization "Akademkniga", engaged in the distribution of literature published by the publishing house of the AS USSR. By the end of the 1980s, "Akademkniga" had branches in many large cities of the country, representing an all-Union network of bookstores distributing literature from the "Nauka" publishing house. In 1934, the publishing house moved to Moscow, and in Leningrad the Leningrad Branch of the Publishing House of the AS USSR was formed. During the years of the Great Patriotic War, the publishing house was evacuated to Kazan.

=== Nauka Publishing House ===
In 1963, the Publishing House of the Academy of Sciences of the USSR was renamed to the Nauka Publishing House, but in 1963—1964 some books continued to be published under the old name of the publishing house. By 1963, the number of books published per year by the publishing house exceeded 2000, and the total volume — 38000 print sheets. In 1964, part of the Publishing House of the AS USSR became Fizmatgiz (now Fizmatlit) and Publishing House of Eastern Literature, they became known as "main editorial offices" of the publishing house, respectively: Main Editorial Office of Physics and Mathematics Literature and Main Editorial Office of Eastern Literature. Another year later, the Siberian Branch of the Nauka Publishing House was created. With the commissioning in 1970 of a printing house in Novosibirsk, the Nauka Publishing House owned four printing houses: two — in Moscow, and one each — in Leningrad and Novosibirsk. In 1972, the publishing house published scientific journals of 135 titles, including 31 physics and mathematics, 24 chemical, 29 biological and 5 popular science journals (Priroda, Earth and Universe, Chemistry and Life, Kvant, Russian Speech). In 1977, 140 journals were published (1.2 issues per year). The publishing house also published the journals Doklady of the AS USSR and Vestnik of the AS USSR. In 1973, the Nauka Publishing House, and in 1978 — its Leningrad printing house, were awarded the Order of the Red Banner of Labour. In the early 1980s, the Main Editorial Office of Literature in Foreign Languages was created at the Nauka Publishing House, which, in particular, published another popular science journal of the Nauka Publishing House — "Science in the USSR", published in Russian, English, German and Spanish. In the system of the Goskomizdat of the USSR the Nauka Publishing House in the 1980s was part of three editorial offices: the main editorial office of socio-political literature, the main editorial office of scientific and technical literature and the main editorial office of fiction. In total, for all these editorial offices in 1970—1990, the book publishing performance indicators of the publishing house were as follows:

	1972	1977	1979	1980	1981	1985	1987	1988	1989	1990
Number of books and brochures, printed units	≈2000	1861	2175	2080	2162	2277	2130	2303	1894	1830
Circulation, million copies	—	≈19	24,3195	20,6268	23,2326	23,3587	22,8782	23,8335	20,610	18,8854
Print sheet-impressions, million	50,5	—	444,3088	349,512	403,267	407,4824	413,0656	413,8068	408,5399	347,1765

In 1992, the Ural Branch of the Nauka Publishing House appeared, based in Yekaterinburg. Soon the branches and editorial offices of the Nauka Publishing House became independent publishing houses included in the Nauka publishing complex, which also includes Akademkniga. Since 1996, the company has been called the State Unitary Enterprise Academic Scientific Publishing, Production-Printing and Book Distribution Center of the RAS "Nauka Publishing House". As of 2012, the center included four printing enterprises located in Makhachkala, Moscow, Novosibirsk and Saint Petersburg, and seven publishing houses. It published 155 journals, 70 percent of which were fully or partially translated into English. In 2019, it was on the verge of bankruptcy. On December 21, 2021, at a court hearing in the Arbitration Court of the City of Moscow, the Federal Tax Service of Russia and the Federal State Unitary Enterprise "Nauka Publishing House" reached a settlement agreement, which regulated the procedure and terms for fulfilling obligations on payments, which became the basis for terminating the bankruptcy case. Under the terms of the agreement, the publishing house must repay the entire amount of debt to the Federal Tax Service of Russia in the amount of 834.8 million rubles within 36 calendar months. By July 2023, a significant part of the debts had been repaid, in December the entire debt was paid. In 2024, "Nauka" became the sole supplier of the RAS for the publication of scientific journals and books and became the "largest publisher of Russian scientific periodicals".

== Criticism ==
In 2003, the chairman of the Commission for Combating Pseudoscience and Falsification of Scientific Research academician E. P. Kruglyakov in a report at a meeting of the Presidium of the RAS noted that in 1997, the "Nauka" publishing house published a monograph by G. I. Shipov "Theory of Physical Vacuum". The book was published on a paid basis. The reviewers of the monograph were doctors of physical and mathematical sciences A. A. Rukhadze and R. N. Kuzmin. Kruglyakov pointed out that science suffered significantly from the release of this book, and as a result "the book became a kind of banner for torsion scammers". In 2006, biologist A. V. Markov in his note on Radio Liberty called the information policy of the "Nauka" publishing house extremely shortsighted, since in most cases the publishing house prohibits posting the texts of published articles on the Internet on the pretext that this may reduce subscription profits. In 2008, in an interview with Radio Liberty, Markov claimed that the "Nauka" publishing house had practically monopolized the publication of almost all academic journals, with rare exceptions. In his opinion, formally the market for academic journals in Russia by that time was divided between the "Nauka" publishing house and MAIK "Nauka/Interperiodica", but in reality they acted as a united front, since de facto they were one company. He also stated about the dire situation of Russian scientific editing and ill-conceived pricing policy:

The entire policy of this publishing house seemed to be deliberately designed to maximally restrict the reader's access to the works of Russian scientists. This is a whole set of measures that was undertaken for this. These are monstrously high prices for the journals themselves, subscription prices, retail prices; in addition, very little money is allocated for scientific editing, for translating annotations.

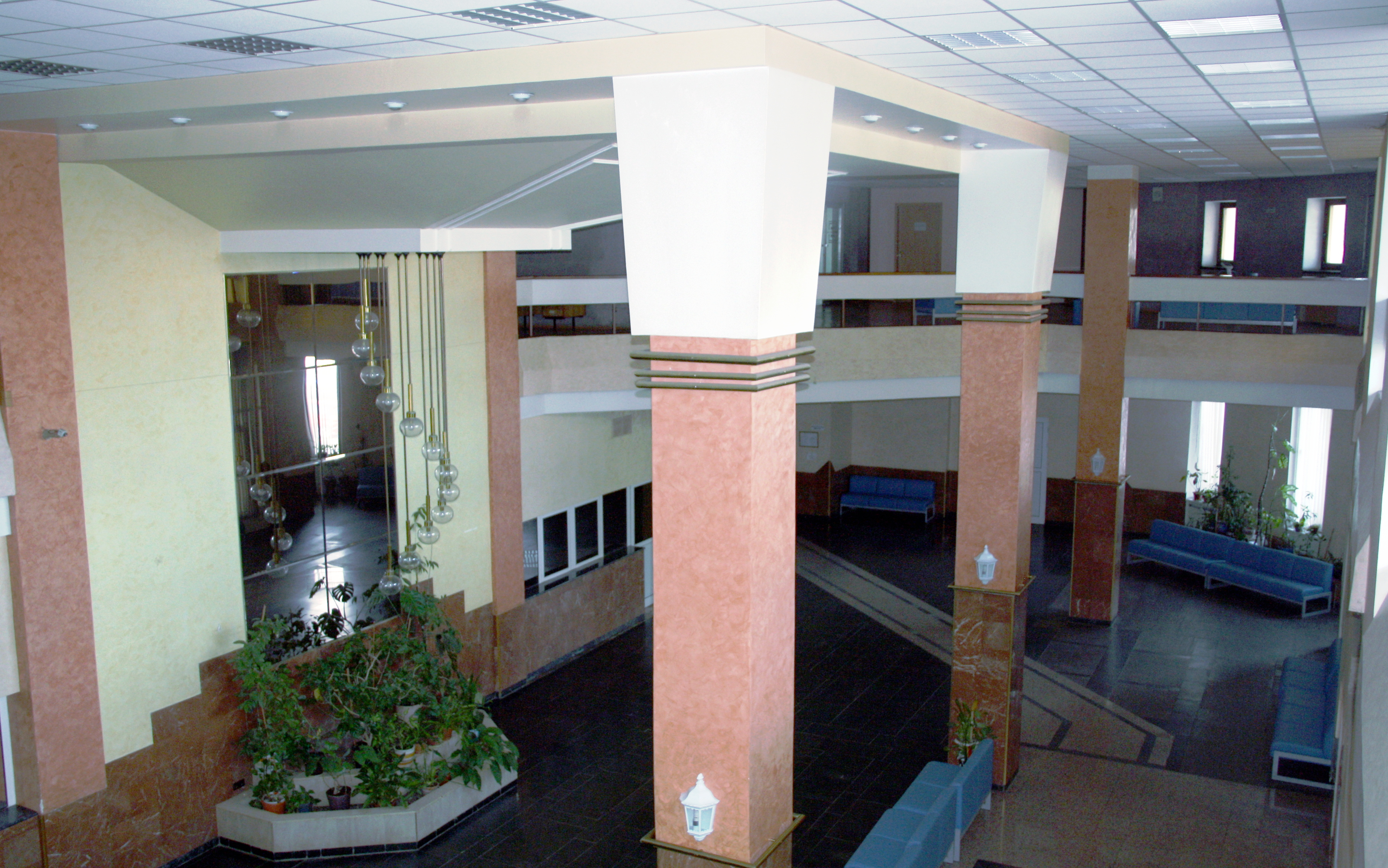
In the Nauka publishing house

In 2012, linguist, research fellow at the Institute of Linguistics of the RAS A. S. Kasyan, based on his experience of interacting with the publishing house, expressed the opinion that "Nauka" is the worst scientific publishing house among all existing scientific publishing houses at the moment. Kasyan notes the "extremely low" level of computer literacy of the publishing house's typesetters and a huge number of errors, some of which remain even after the second proofreading. Kasyan is greatly surprised that to convert text from Microsoft Word, which authors use, to some Macintosh editor, which are used in the publishing house, manual retyping of the text is usually applied. At the same time, such typing is "very poor quality", and the verification is nominal, so the authors themselves have to do the actual verification, Kasyan points out. Kasyan also believes that due to corruption schemes, Nauka has a "droit du seigneur", when the publishing house "takes a significant part of the manuscripts submitted by authors for funding to state funds (and, say, the aforementioned magazine Voprosy yazykoznaniya has been trying for many years to demand the right to prepare typesetting by the editorial staff, but the management of Nauka categorically refuses it)".

In 2013, head of the laboratory of the ICS RAS, professor of the Financial University under the Government of the Russian Federation R. M. Nizhegorodtsev, commenting on criticism of the "Lambert Academic Publishing" publishing house, noted that a number of well-known publishing houses, including the "Nauka" publishing house, also have commercial departments that publish books on order on a paid basis. Nizhegorodtsev points out that a significant number of books published by such commercial departments "do not meet obvious criteria for scientific research", while the books published by the "Nauka" publishing house lack information about the method of their financing. In Nizhegorodtsev's opinion, "scientific mediocrity and incompetence" cannot be stopped by refusing to recognize "Lambert" books as scientific publications, because a businessman or official with money can publish his book on order, including in the "Nauka" publishing house. At the same time, such a method of publication is inaccessible to graduates and graduate students who do not have significant funds. In 2018, Doctor of Physical and Mathematical Sciences, head of the department of the KIAM RAS M. M. Gorbunov-Posadov in the newspaper Troitsky Variant – Science" noted that the publishing house's website states that "the manuscript of the book is submitted to the „Nauka“ publishing house with the following documents: 1) two reviews...", expressed the opinion that thus "there is no question of independent peer review". At the same time, Gorbunov-Posadov, referring to the "Ethical Principles of Scientific Publications" posted there, finds it amusing that "the publishing house treats the peer review of journal articles quite responsibly", concluding that there are double standards, since "for an article, the authors themselves cannot select reviewers, but for a monograph – please". By 2023, the volume of criticism had decreased: the new leadership set itself the tasks of becoming a center for state support of scientific book publishing and developing Russian scientific periodicals, working more actively with authors.

== See also ==
- Fizmatlit
- Nauka academic journals

== Bibliography ==
- Kasyan, Aleksey Sergeevich (28 August 2012). «Nauka» na kone / "Science" on Horseback (in Russian). Troitsky Variant — Nauka.
- Komkov, Gennadiy Danilovich (1970). «Nauka» / "Science" (in Russian). Vol. 10. Bol'shaya Sovetskaya Entsiklopediya.
- Komkov, Gennadiy Danilovich (1972). Izdatel'stvu «Nauka» 50 let / Publisher "Science" 50 Years (in Russian). Moscow: Nauka. p. 44.
- Komkov, Gennadiy Danilovich; Fokin, S. Ya. (1979). Izdatel'skaya deyatel'nost' AN SSSR i nekotorye problemy yeyo sovershenstvovaniya / Publishing Activities of the USSR Academy of Sciences and Some Issues of Its Improvement (in Russian). Nauchno-tekhnicheskaya informatsiya. pp. 3–9.
- Chertova, G. I. (2013). Osipov, Yuriy Sergeevich; Kravets, Sergey Leonidovich (eds.). «Nauka» / "Science" (in Russian). Vol. 22: Nanonauka — Nikolay Kavasila. Moscow: Bol'shaya Rossiyskaya entsiklopediya. p. 144. ISBN 978-5-85270-358-3.
- Prokhorov, Aleksandr Mikhailovich, ed. (1981). «Nauka» / "Science" (in Russian). Moscow: Sovetskaya entsiklopediya. p. 876.
- Sikorsky, Nikolay Mikhailovich, ed. (1982). «Nauka» / "Science" (in Russian). Moscow: Sovetskaya entsiklopediya. p. 664.
