= Dubravica, Neum =

Dubravica
- Village
- Location within Bosnia and Herzegovina
- Coordinates: 42.9349748°N 17.7417222°E
- Country: Bosnia and Herzegovina
- Entity: Federation of Bosnia and Herzegovina
- Canton: Herzegovina-Neretva
- Municipality: Neum

Area
  - Total: 1.50 sq mi (3.88 km^{2})

Population (2013)
  - Total: 63
  - Density: 42/sq mi (16/km^{2})
- Time zone: UTC+1 (CET)
  - Summer (DST): UTC+2 (CEST)

Dubravica is a village in the municipality of Neum, Bosnia and Herzegovina.

== Demographics ==
According to the 2013 census, its population was 63, all Croats.
