= Mileva Prvanović =

Serbian mathematician

Mileva Prvanović (born July 16, 1929 - February 12, 2016) was a Serbian differential geometer. She was retired professor of mathematics at the University of Novi Sad and a member of the Serbian Academy of Sciences and Arts.

== Education and career ==
Prvanović was born in Knjaževac on July 16, 1929, the daughter of mathematics professor Stanko Prvanović (1904–1982). After studying at the University of Belgrade, she earned a doctorate in 1955 from the University of Zagreb under the supervision of Danilo Blanuša, with a dissertation concerning differential geometry. In doing so, she became the first student in Serbia to earn a doctorate in geometry.

While completing her doctorate, she worked as a teaching assistant at the Serbian Academy of Sciences. Then, she joined the mathematics department at Novi Sad as an assistant professor. She was promoted to docent in 1957, associate professor in 1962, and full professor in 1967. She retired in 1993. As well as her professorial duties, she also served as editor in chief of the journal Publications de l'Institut Mathématique of the Mathematical Institute of the Serbian Academy of Sciences and Arts.

She died on February 12, 2016 in Belgrade.

== Recognition ==
Prvanović was elected to the Serbian Academy of Sciences and Arts in 1981. A seminar in Vrnjačka Banja was held in 2014 in honor of her 85th birthday.
