= Almir Badnjević =

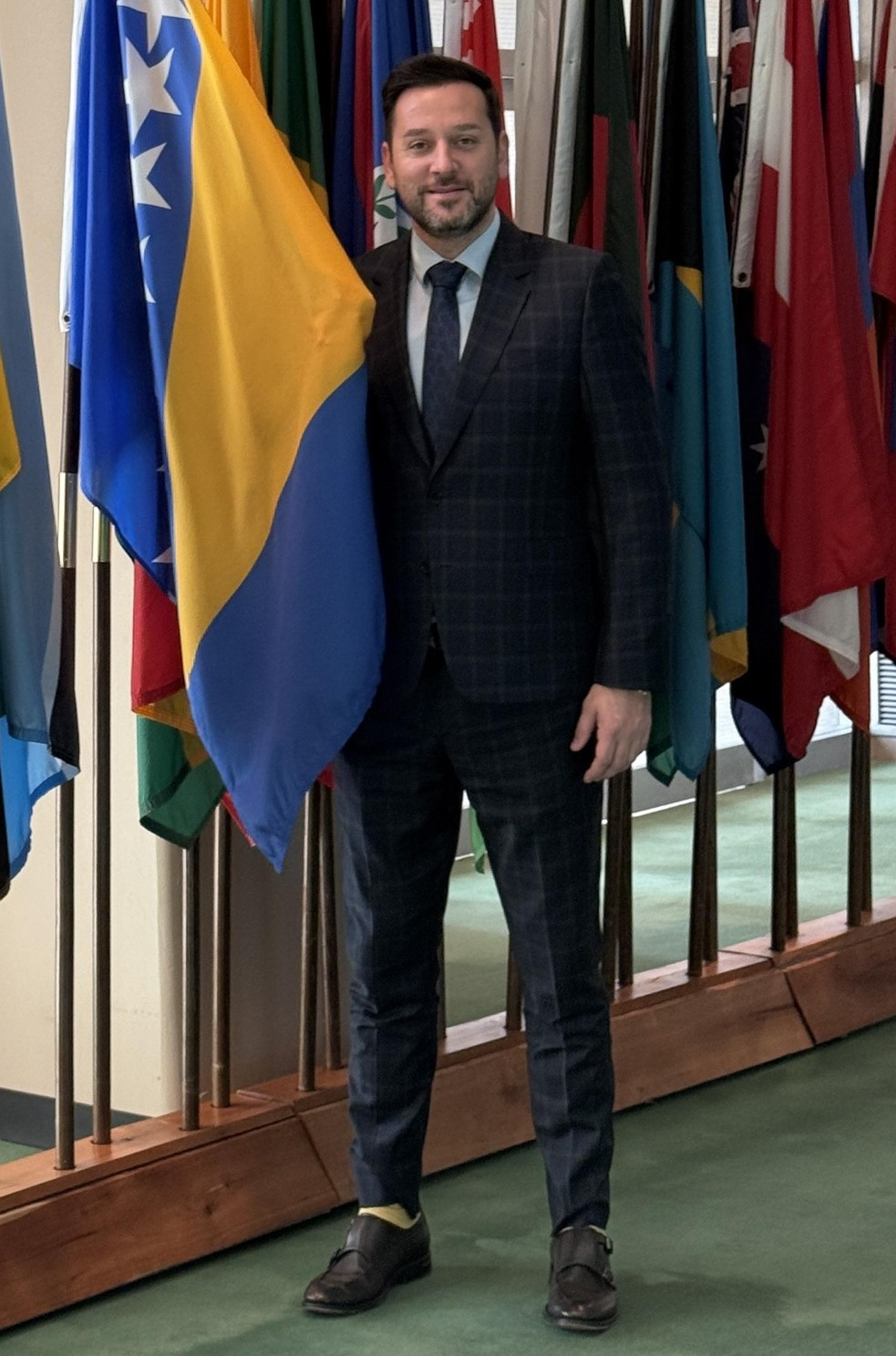
- Born: 1986 (age 39–40); Bosanska Krupa, Bosnia and Herzegovina
- Citizenship: Bosnian-Herzegovinian
- Education: University of Sarajevo; University of Zagreb
- Scientific career
- Fields: Biomedical engineering, medical devices, health informatics, artificial intelligence
- Workplaces: Agency for Identification Documents, Registers and Data Exchange of Bosnia and Herzegovina; International Burch University; University of Sarajevo; Verlab Institute

Almir Badnjević (born 1986 in Bosanska Krupa) is a Bosnian-Herzegovinian scientist, engineer, and university professor. Since 2023, he has served as the director of the Agency for Identification Documents, Registers and Data Exchange of Bosnia and Herzegovina (IDDEEA). He is the founder of the company and scientific research institute Verlab.

== Biography ==
He completed his undergraduate and master's studies at the Faculty of Electrical Engineering in Sarajevo, and earned his doctorate in 2015 from the Faculty of Electrical Engineering and Computing at the University of Zagreb.

In his academic career, he has worked at the International Burch University in Sarajevo, where he was involved in the development of bioengineering study programs, as well as at the University of Sarajevo.

== Career and Scientific Work ==
The primary focus of his scientific research and professional work encompasses the inspection and regulation of medical devices.

He is the founder and long-time director of Verlab, a scientific research institute specializing in biomedical engineering, medical devices, and artificial intelligence in Bosnia and Herzegovina.

He is a full member of the International Academy of Sciences and Arts in Bosnia and Herzegovina, and in 2021, he was elected as a full member of the European Academy of Sciences and Arts.

== Controversies ==
=== Conflict of Interest in Privredna Banka Sarajevo ===
In November 2026, the Banking Agency of the Federation of Bosnia and Herzegovina revoked the approval for Almir Badnjević's appointment as a member of the Supervisory Board of Privredna Banka Sarajevo (PBS). The Agency's decision established a violation of the conflict of interest prevention provisions defined by the FBiH Banking Law. According to the findings, Badnjević participated in the approval of financial arrangements within the bank that indirectly involved legal entities with which he had ownership ties, without prior notification to the competent bodies of the bank and recusal from the decision-making process.

=== Criminal Complaints at IDDEEA ===
During 2025, the media reported information regarding criminal complaints filed against Badnjević in connection with his work as the director of IDDEEA. The subject of the complaints related to hiring processes and employee attendance records within the Agency. Badnjević characterized these complaints as pressures aimed at discrediting the institution he leads.

=== "Respirators" Affair ===
The Verlab company, founded by Badnjević, was engaged for the technical verification of ACM812A Chinese ventilators imported into Bosnia and Herzegovina during the COVID-19 pandemic (a case known as the "Respirators" affair). Due to the laboratory's role in the verification process, Badnjević faced public criticism, including accusations from the then-Prime Minister of the Federation of BiH, Fadil Novalić. Badnjević rejected these allegations, pointing out that the inspected medical devices at that time did not meet the legal and technical requirements for use in intensive care units.
