= Blaženka Divjak =

Croatian mathematician and politician

PhD Blaženka Divjak
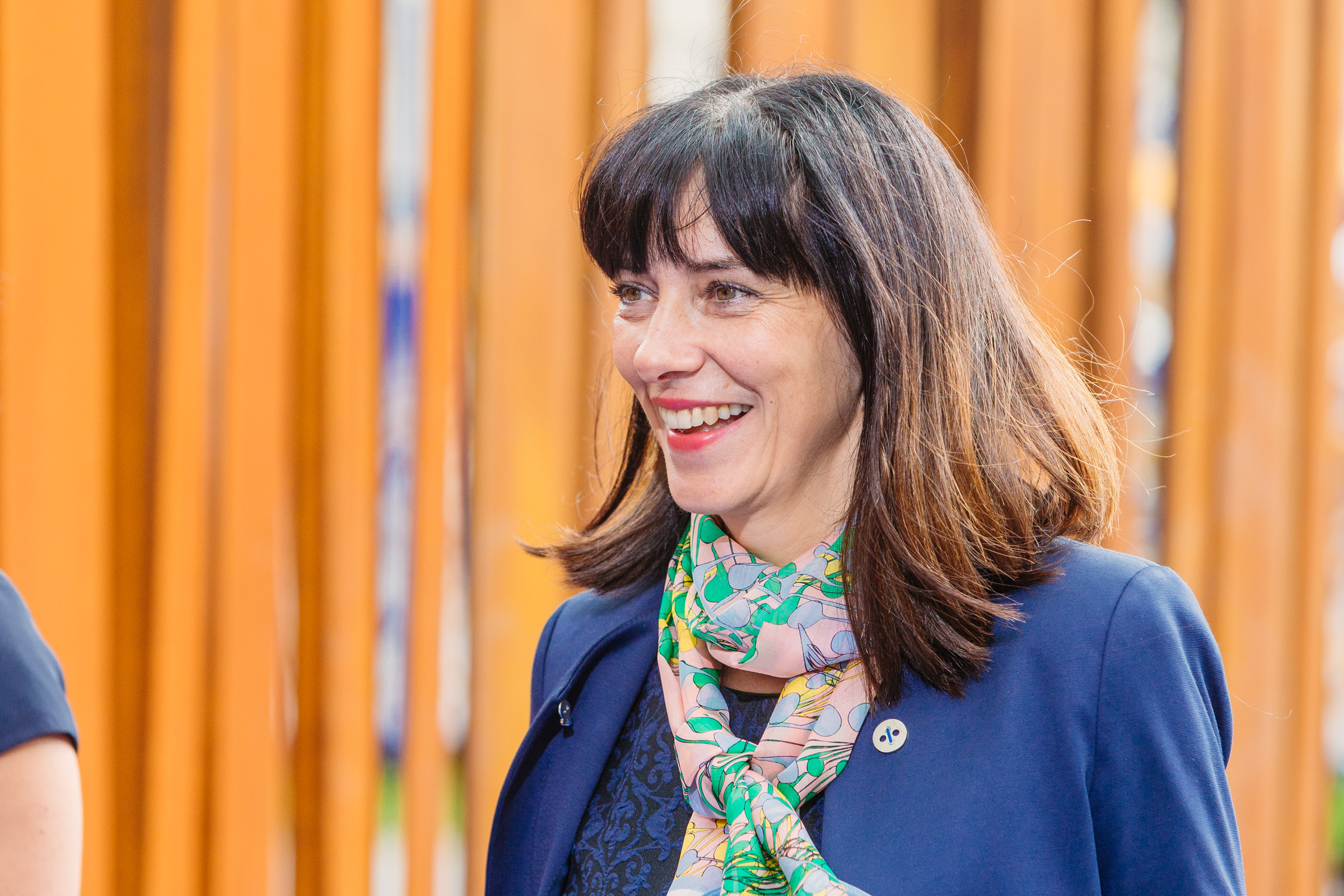
- Divjak in Estonia during the EU2017EE Estonian Presidency

Minister of Science and Education
- In office 9 June 2017 – 23 July 2020
- Prime Minister: Andrej Plenković
- Preceded by: Pavo Barišić
- Succeeded by: Radovan Fuchs

Personal details
- Born: 1 January 1967 (age 59) Varaždin, SR Croatia, SFR Yugoslavia (modern Croatia)
- Party: Independent
- Education: University of Zagreb, Faculty of Science
- Occupation: Mathematician; University professor

Blaženka Divjak (born 1 January 1967) is a Croatian scientist and university professor at the University of Zagreb, Faculty of Organization and Informatics in Varaždin. She served as Minister of Science and Education from 9 June 2017 until 23 July 2020.

== Political life ==
Blaženka Divjak has led curricular reform of general education, reform of vocational education and training, enhancement of relevance of higher education and excellence of research in recent years. She was chairing EU Council of ministers for education and Council of ministers for research and space during Croatian presidency (January – June 2020).

== Education ==
She holds a PhD in mathematics from the University of Zagreb, Faculty of Science and Mathematics. She served as Vice-Rector (academic official) for students and study programs at the University of Zagreb (2010–2014).

== Sources ==
1. "Tri godine promjena". Ministarstvo znanosti i obrazovanja.
