= University North =

Public university in Croatia

- Sveučilište Sjever
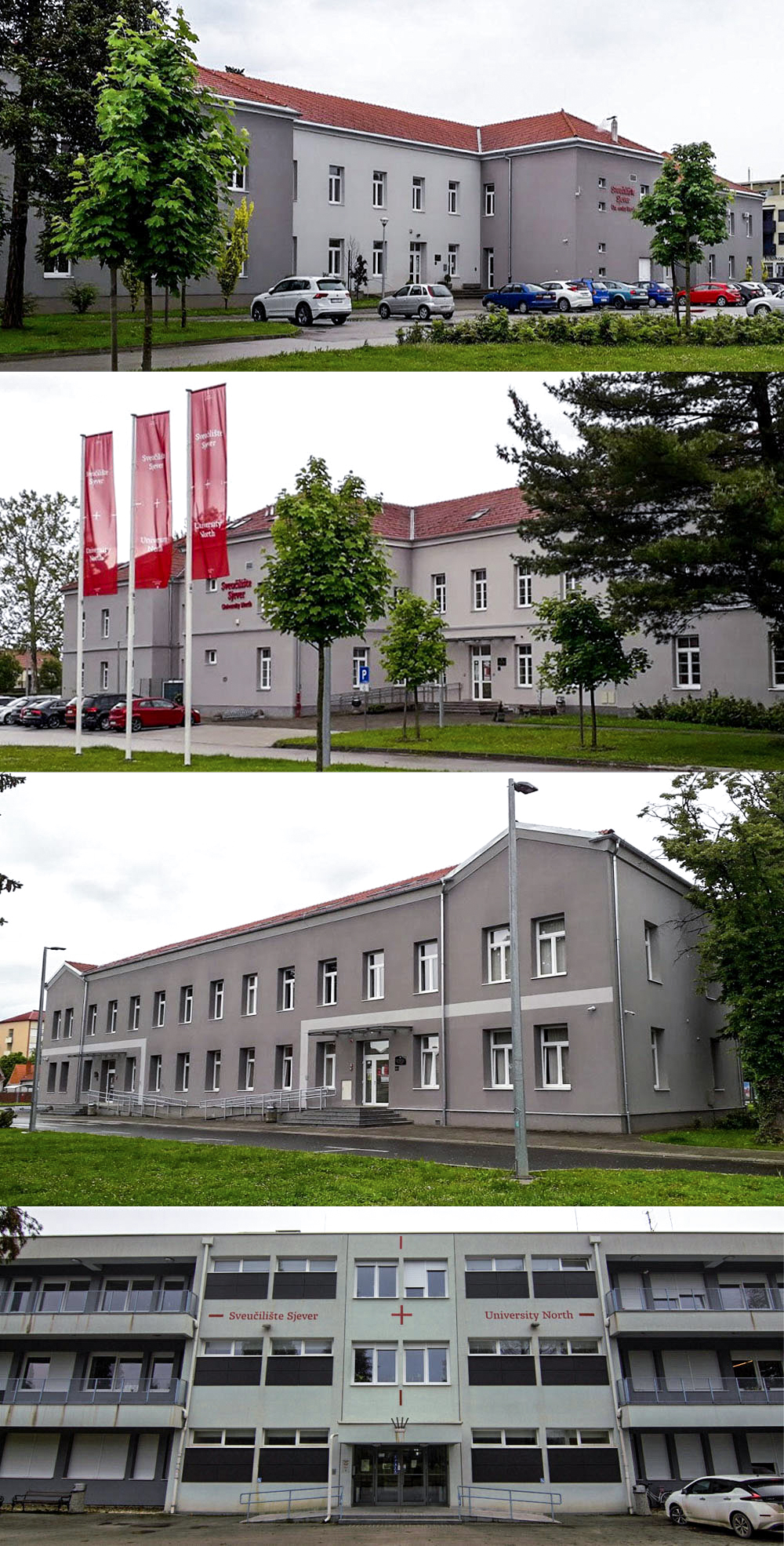
- Motto: Knowledge is in your hands.
- Type: Public
- Established: 2015; 11 years ago
- Affiliations: European University Association
- Endowment: 11.3 million €
- Rector: Marin Milković
- Academic staff: 179 (2021.)
- Students: 5200 (2021)
- Doctoral students: 122
- Location: Koprivnica and Varaždin, Croatia
- Colours
- Website: www.unin.hr

University rankings

Regional – Overall
- QS Emerging Europe and Central Asia: 401-450 (2022)
- QS Europe: 601+ (2025)

The University North (Croatian: Sveučilište Sjever) is a public university in Croatia that operates in two university centres, Koprivnica and Varaždin. It is the fifth largest university in Croatia based on the number of students and the only public university operating in Northern Croatia alongside the University of Zagreb. The university was founded in 2015 by merging the University of Applied Sciences in Varaždin and the Media University in Koprivnica, thus becoming the eighth Croatian public university.

== Departments ==
The university is organized in 20 departments.

=== University centre Koprivnica ===
- Department of Media and Communication
- Department of Environmental protection, recycling and packaging
- Department of Communication, Media and Journalism
- Department of Logistics and Sustainable Mobility
- Department of Business and Management
- Department of Food Technology
- Department of Art Studies
- Department of Computing and Informatics

=== University centre Varaždin ===
- Department of Economics
- Department of Electrical Engineering
- Department of Physiotherapy
- Department of Geodesy and Geomatics
- Department of Music and Media
- Department of Construction
- Department of Mechatronics
- Department of Multimedia
- Department of Public Communications
- Department of Nursing
- Department of Mechanical Engineering
- Department of Technical and Economic Logistics

== Gallery ==
University North
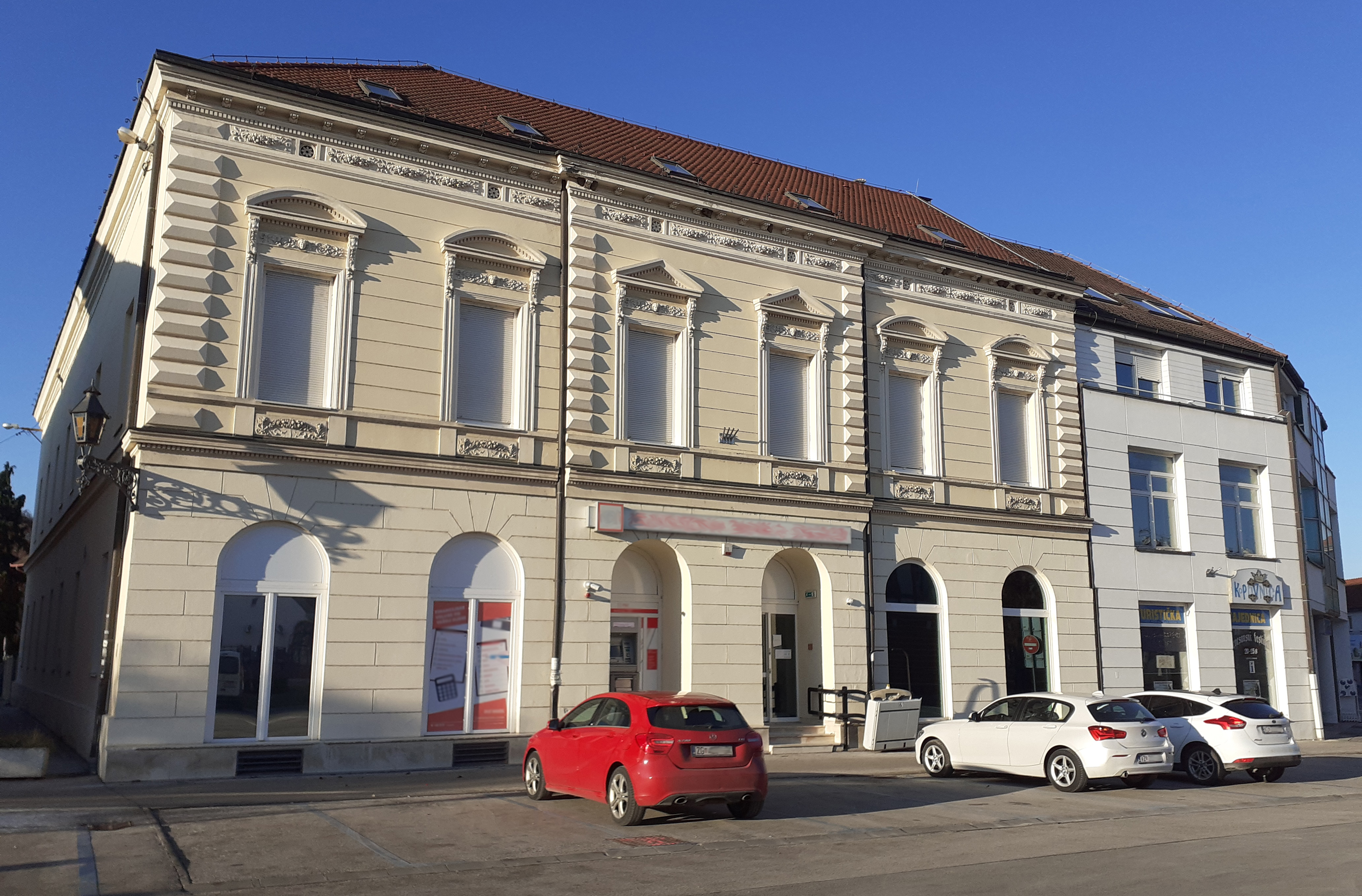
Former Media university building, now used by University North.

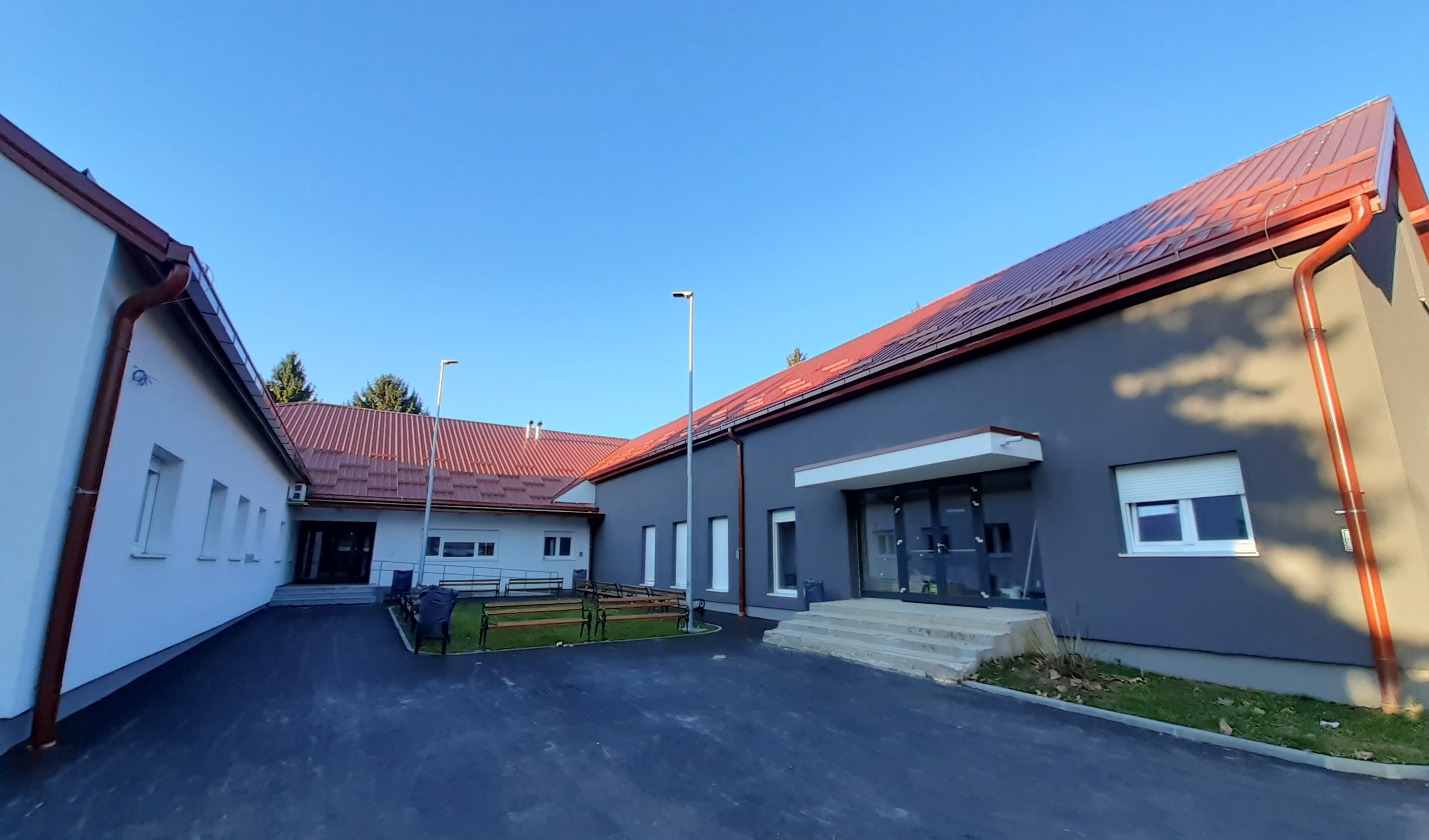
Nutritional sciences laboratory of the University North in Koprivnica.
