= Željko Jovanović (politician) =

Croatian politician

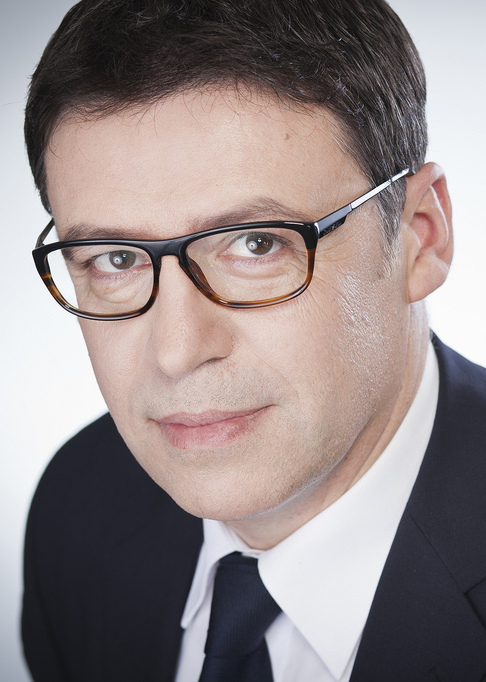

Minister of Science, Education and Sports
- In office 23 December 2011 – 11 June 2014
- Prime Minister: Zoran Milanović
- Succeeded by: Vedran Mornar
- Preceded by: Radovan Fuchs

Personal details
- Born: 26 November 1965 (age 60) Rijeka, SR Croatia, SFR Yugoslavia (modern Croatia)
- Party: Social Democratic Party
- Education: University of Rijeka

Željko Jovanović (born 26 November 1965) is a Croatian politician and physician who served as Minister of Science, Education and Sports from 2011 until 2014. He is a member of the center-left Social Democratic Party of Croatia.

== Early life ==
Jovanović, an ethnic Serb, was born on 26 November 1965 in Rijeka. He spent his early childhood in Grobnik, Podhum and Svilno with his parents Niko and Petra. He enrolled into elementary school after moving to Turnić. His brother Slobodan was born in this period. Jovanović's class was the only group in generation which studied Russian as the foreign language in the school. As a child, Jovanović was interested in sports and movies. He particularly liked Otpisani, Gustav and Bruce Lee. In 1978, he participated in "Šamac Sarajevo 78" youth work action.

== Education ==
Jovanović graduated medicine from the School of Medicine of the University of Rijeka, and gained master's degree's in the field of biomedical sciences (Rijeka School of Medicine, 1995) and in the field of marketing management (Rijeka Faculty of Economics, 2005). He also holds doctorate in internal medicine. During his studies Jovanović was involved in student politics and he was president of the Student Union at the School of Medicine, president of the Student Board of the University of Rijeka and the First Student Vice-Rector. He completed further professional development at the London Business School and INSEAD.

== Politics ==
Since 23 December 2011, Jovanović has held the post of Minister of Science, Education and Sports in the centre-left government of Zoran Milanović. He received his doctorate in biomedical science and his master's degree in economics at the University of Rijeka in 2005.

On 13 January 2012, Antun Vrdoljak threatened to sue if Jovanović did not apologize for accusing Vrdoljak, in his capacity as member of the International Olympic Committee, of "selling the candidacy of the City of Rijeka for hosting the Mediterranean games."

== Personal life ==
Jovanović was a member of the Croatian Army during the Croatian War of Independence. He is married and has one son.
