= Priroda (journal) =

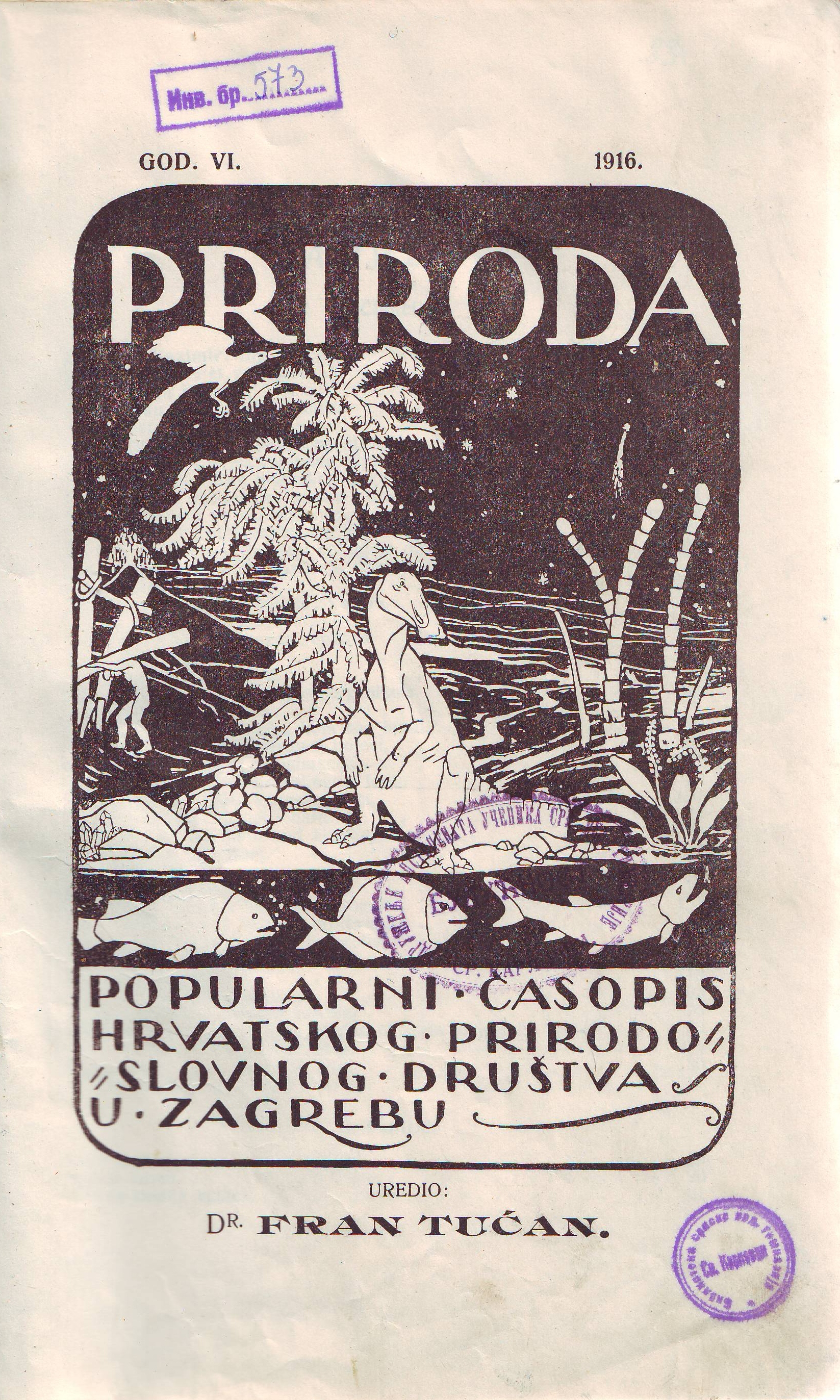
- Priroda cover
- Discipline: Natural sciences
- Language: Croatian
- Edited by: Dario Hrupec and Nenad Judaš

Publication details
- Former name: Glasnik
- History: 1911–present
- Publisher: Croatian Society of Natural Sciences (Croatia)
- Frequency: 10/year

Standard abbreviations
- ISO 4: Priroda

Indexing
- ISSN: 0351-0662

Links
- Journal homepage

Priroda (English: Nature) is a Croatian trade journal for popularization of science and among the oldest continuously publishing natural science journals in the world, since 1911. It is published ten times a year by Croatian Society of Natural Sciences in Croatian. The journal is considered as one of the oldest eco-awareness journals in the world.

The founding editor of the magazine was a prominent Croatian malacologist Spiridon Brusina, who was among the founders of the same Society that publishes the journal. Editors of Priroda included chemists Fran Bubanović, Franjo Krleža and Drago Grdenić, physicist Ivan Supek, biologists Fran Kušan and Nikola Ljubešić, mineralogist Fran Tućan, as well as many other eminent Croatian scientists and academics.
