= Erdut =

Erdut Ердут (Serbian)
- Municipality
- Municipality of Erdut; Općina Erdut; Општина Ердут
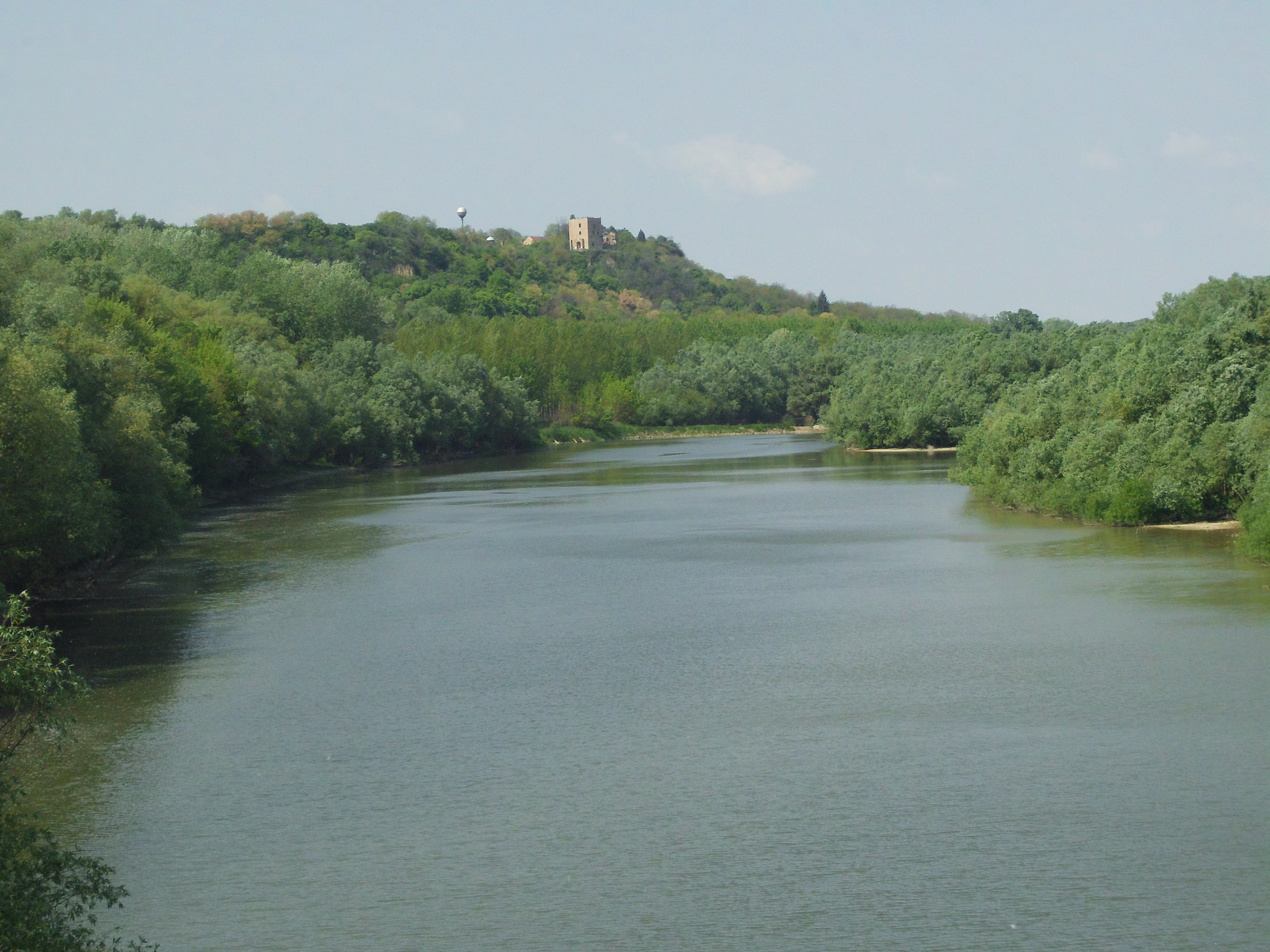
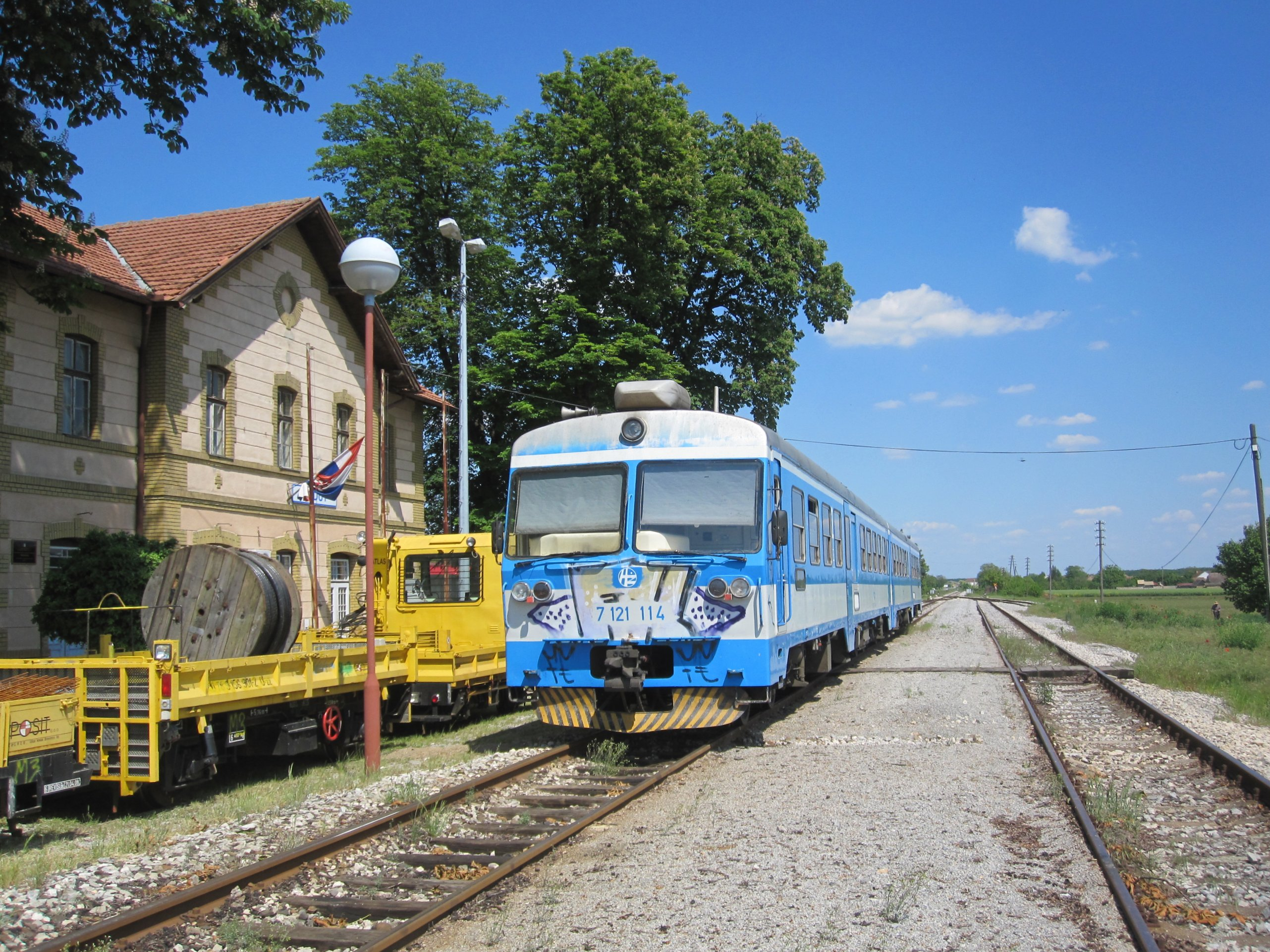
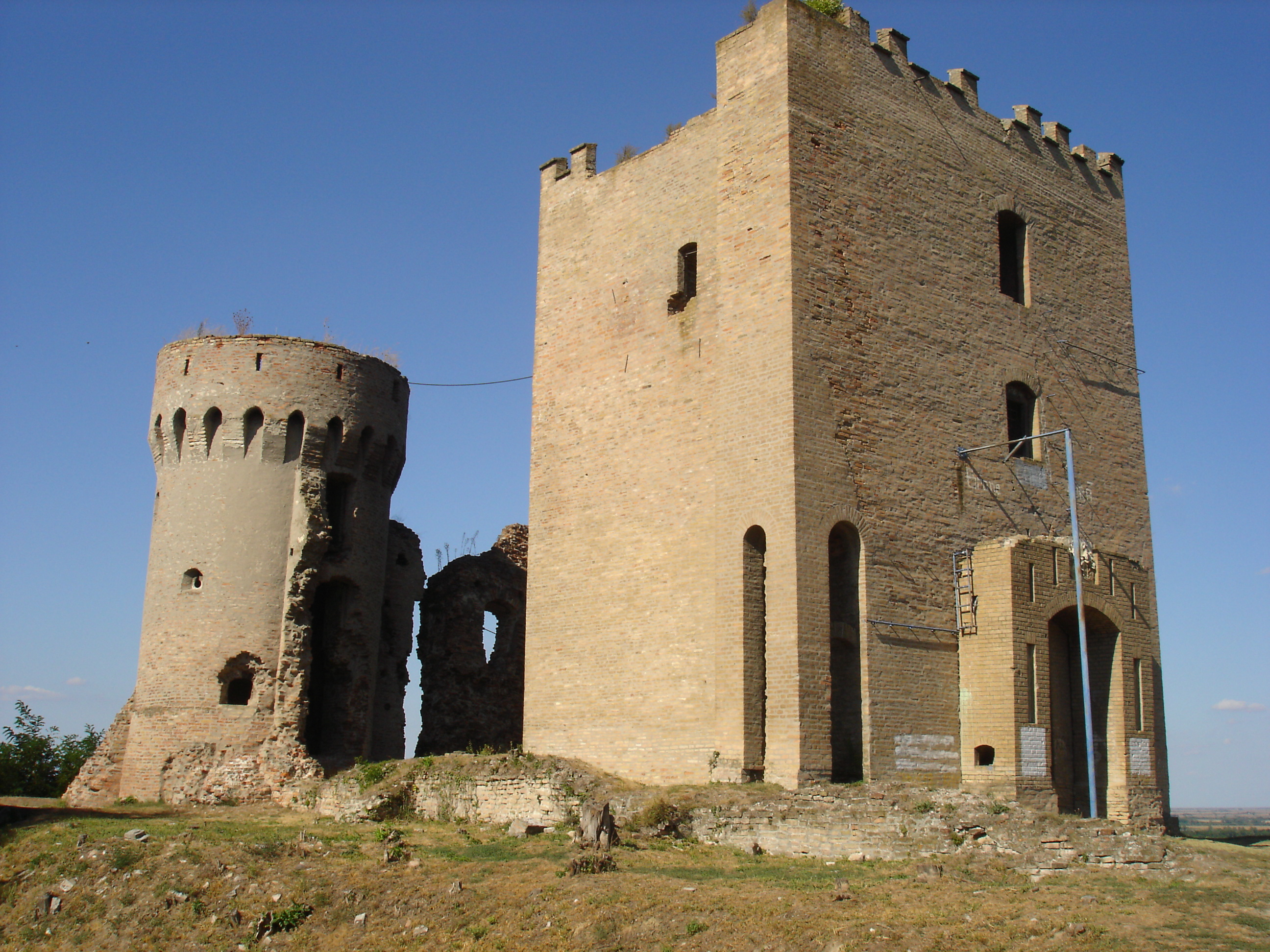
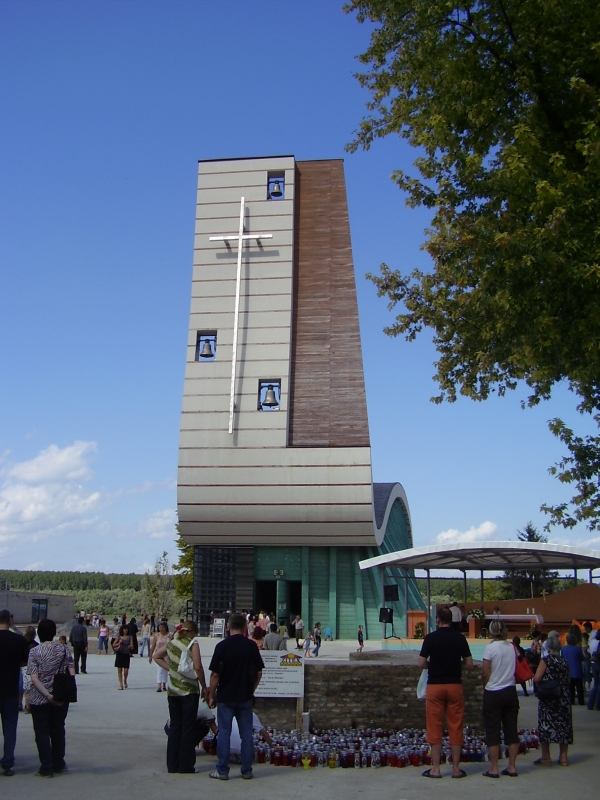
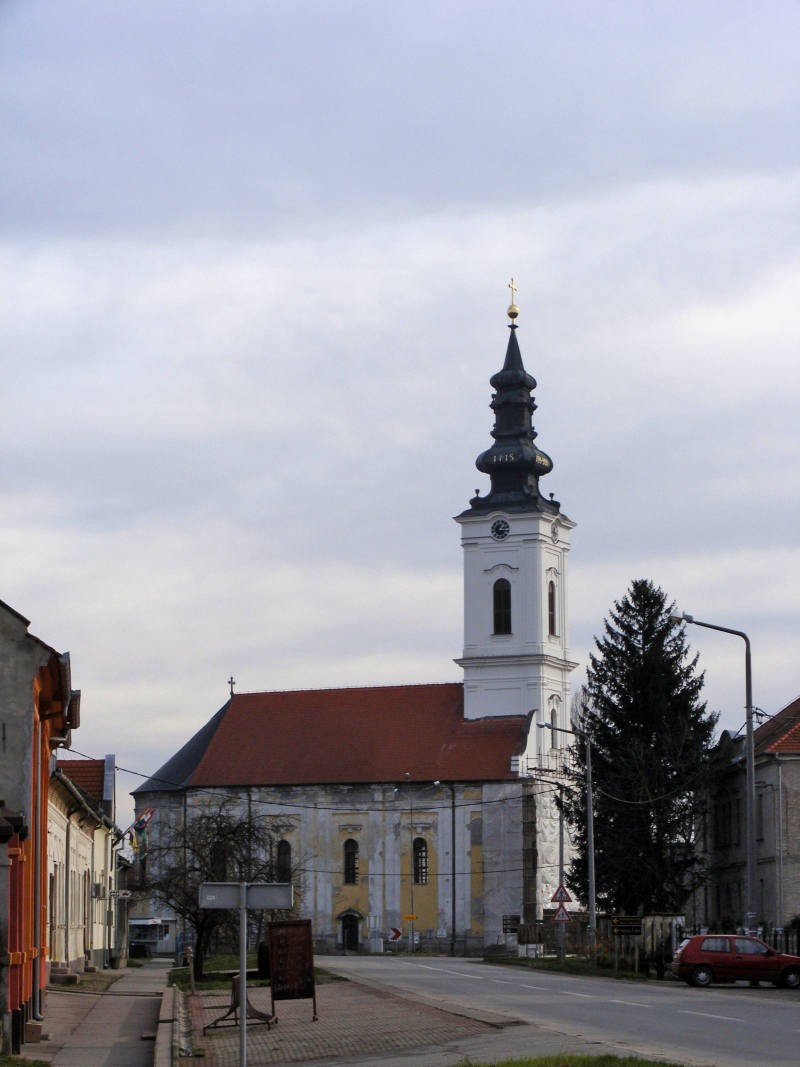
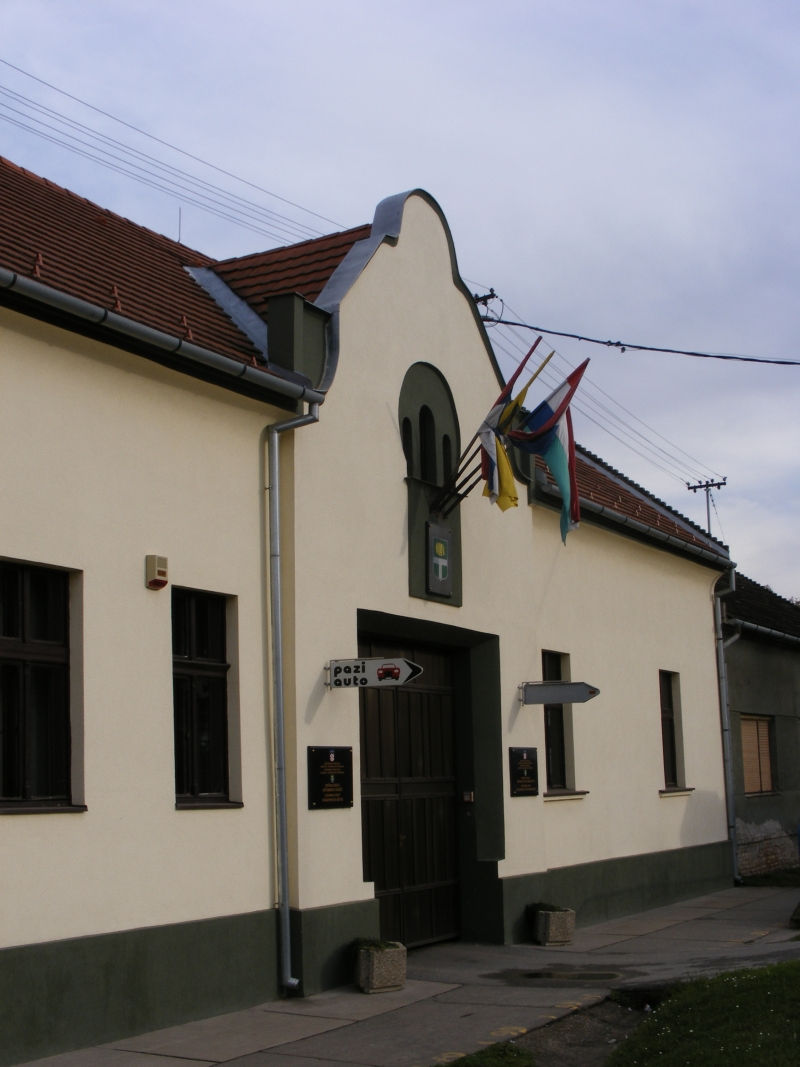
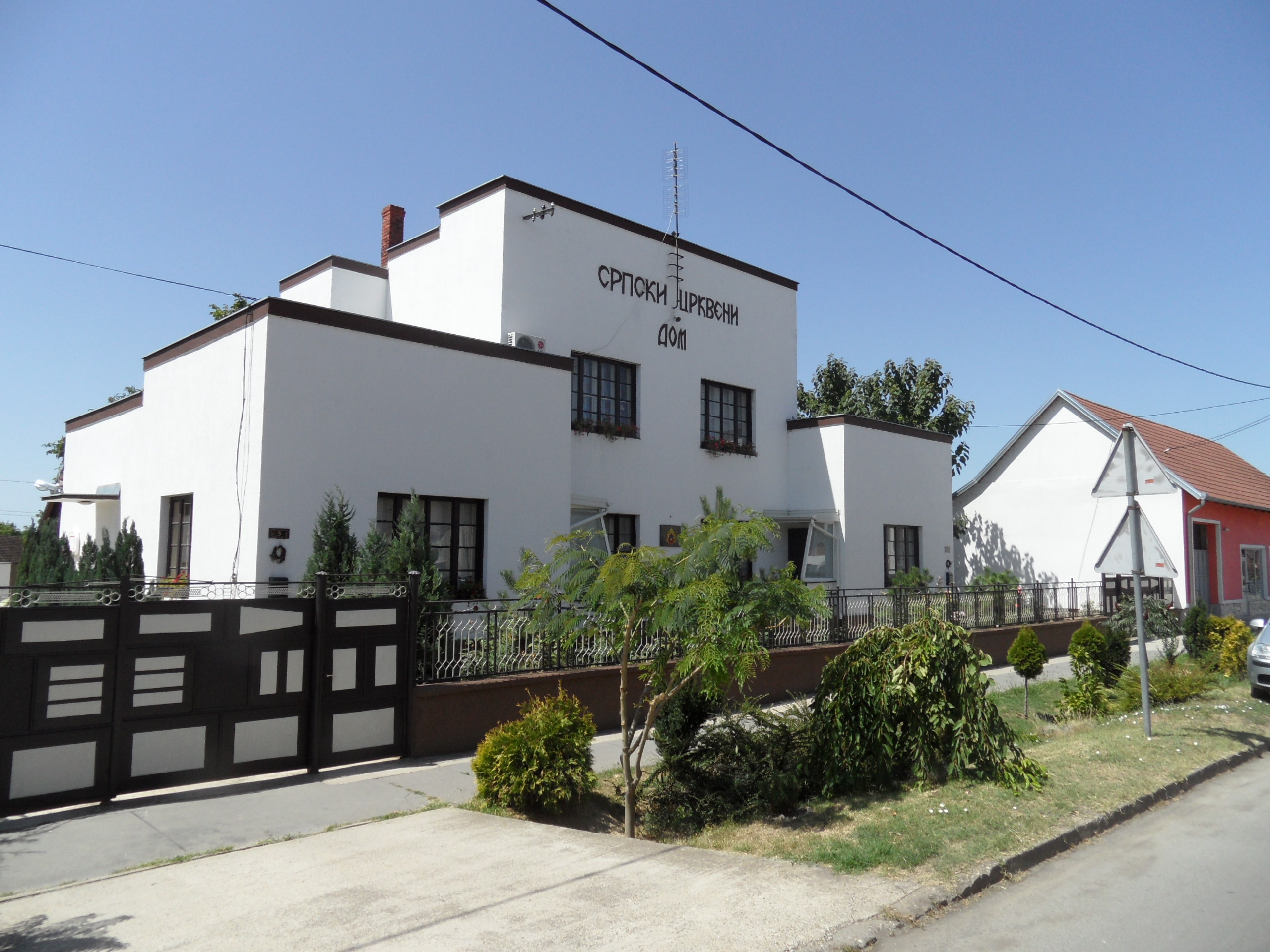
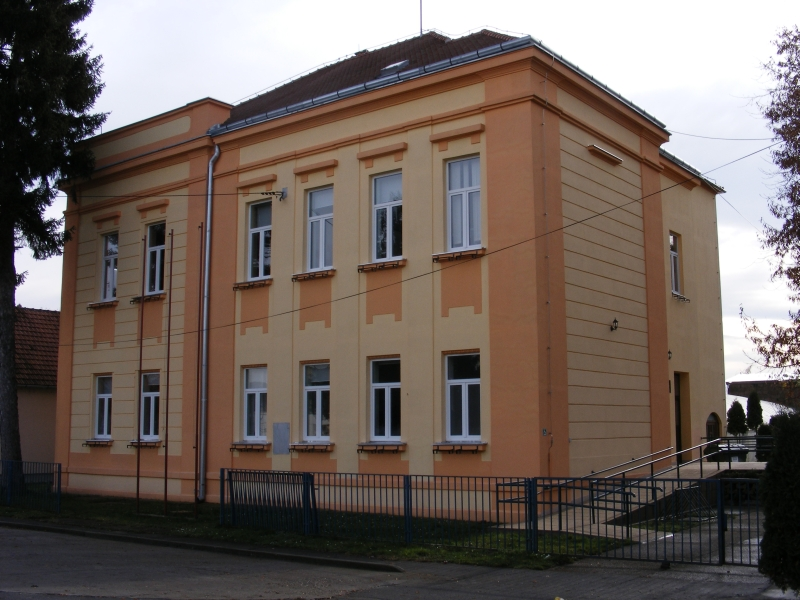
- Villages of the Erdut Municipality

- Flag Coat of arms

- Location of Erdut in Croatia Erdut (Croatia) Erdut (Europe)
- Coordinates: 45°32′N 19°04′E
- Country: Croatia
- Region: Slavonia (Podunavlje)
- County: Osijek-Baranja County
- Municipal seat Largest settlement: Erdut (nominal), Dalj (administrative) Dalj

Government
  - Municipal mayor: Jugoslav Vesić (SDSS)

Area
  - Municipality: 157.5 km^{2} (60.8 sq mi)
  - Urban: 30.5 km^{2} (11.8 sq mi)
- Elevation: 158 m (518 ft)

Population (2021)
  - Municipality: 5,436
  - Density: 34.51/km^{2} (89.39/sq mi)
  - Urban: 561
  - Urban density: 18.4/km^{2} (47.6/sq mi)
- Time zone: UTC+1 (CET)
  - Summer (DST): UTC+2 (CEST)
- Postal codes: 31204 Bijelo Brdo; 31205 Aljmaš; 31206 Erdut; 31226 Dalj
- Area code: 031
- Official languages: Croatian, Serbian
- Website: opcina-erdut.hr

Erdut ([ěrduːt]) is a village and a municipality in eastern Croatia some 37 km east of the major city of Osijek. Lying on the border with neighbouring Serbia, it was the site of the signing of the 1995 Erdut Agreement, which initiated the UNTAES transitional administration over the Eastern Slavonia, Baranja and Western Syrmia.

The village of Erdut is the third largest in the municipality, after Dalj and Bijelo Brdo. The municipality is part of the Osijek-Baranja County in eastern Slavonia. The municipal center is in the largest village of Dalj.

== Name and languages ==
The name Erdut comes from the local Hungarian name (Erdőd) meaning "forest road". In other languages, the village in German is known as Erdung and in Serbian as Ердут.

Due to the local minority population, the Erdut municipality prescribe the use of not only Croatian as the official language, but the Serbian language and Serbian Cyrillic alphabet as well. As of 2023, most of the legal requirements for the fulfillment of bilingual standards have been carried out. Cyrillic is used on official seals, buildings and street and traffic signs. Cyrillic is used on most but not all official documents. There public legal and administrative employees proficient in the script. Preserving traditional Serbian place names and assigning street names to Serbian historical figures is legally mandated and carried out.

== Geography ==
The municipality has a total area of 158 km^{2} (61 sq mi) and is the largest member municipality of Joint Council of Municipalities. The Drava (5.6 km) and Danube (34.825 km) rivers flow through the municipality. The territory of the municipality is completely flat very fertile black soil. The elevation of the village of Erdut is 158 m. It is located at the end of the D213 road near border crossing with Serbia. The railway station is located in Novi Erdut (New Erdut) hamlet, about 1 km south of the village, on the Vukovar-Erdut-Bogojevo (Serbia) railway.

== History ==
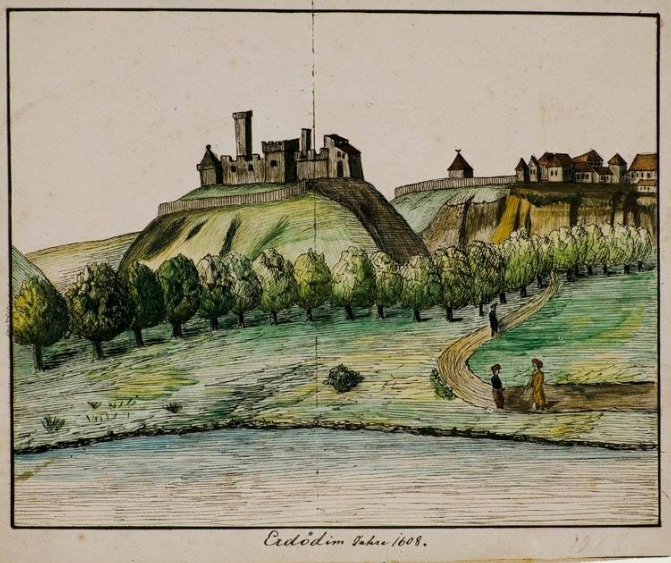
Erdut Castle in 1608.

The settlement was first mentioned in 1335 under the Hungarian name Erdöd and then as a city in 1472. It was successively ruled by Ottoman Empire, Austrian Empire, Austria-Hungary, Kingdom of Yugoslavia, Independent State of Croatia and Yugoslavia.

=== Croatian War of Independence ===
When Croatia declared independence from Yugoslavia in 1991, eastern Slavonia was soon overrun by the Yugoslav People's Army and Serb paramilitaries, led by the notorious warlord, Željko Ražnatović known by the name Arkan. The battle for Erdut quickly ended that summer as the entire Croatian population was expelled or killed along with other minorities including Czechs, Germans, Hungarians, Ruthenians and Ukrainians in an act of ethnic cleansing. Their homes were soon occupied by other Serbs. Many buildings and homes were destroyed, including the Roman Catholic Church.

Arkan soon set up a training camp for his Serb Volunteer Guard in Erdut, which became headquarters until the end of the war, when Croatian forces returned according to a peaceful Basic Agreement on the Region of Eastern Slavonia, Baranja and Western Sirmium.

==== Erdut Agreement ====
On November 12, 1995, officials signed what is commonly called the Erdut Agreement in which the part of eastern Slavonia still occupied by Serbs would be integrated back into Croatia, gradually allowing some of the exiled refugees to return to their homes. This agreement was the basis for the establishment of Joint Council of Municipalities. Erdut has been under Croatian control since 1998.

== Demographics ==
Historical population of Erdut municipality
Year	Pop.	±%
1880	9,421	—
1890	10,451	+10.9%
1900	10,904	+4.3%
1910	11,373	+4.3%
1921	10,543	−7.3%
1931	10,976	+4.1%
1948	10,177	−7.3%
1953	10,324	+1.4%
1961	11,440	+10.8%
1971	11,353	−0.8%
1981	11,035	−2.8%
1991	10,197	−7.6%
2001	8,417	−17.5%
2011	7,308	−13.2%
Source: Naselja i stanovništvo Republike Hrvatske 1857–2001, DZS, Zagreb, 2005

=== Population ===
According to the 2011 census, the municipality has a population is 7,308. The municipal population consists of Serbs (55,56%), Croats (37,96%) and Hungarians (5,06%).

There are 4 settlements in municipality:

Settlement	population
Aljmaš	610
Bijelo Brdo	1,976
Dalj	3,952
Erdut	818

=== Religion ===
Dalj is seat of the Eparchy of Osječko polje and Baranja of the Serbian Orthodox Church.

== Politics ==
=== Joint Council of Municipalities ===
The Municipality of Erdut is one of seven Serb majority member municipalities within the Joint Council of Municipalities, inter-municipal sui generis organization of ethnic Serb community in eastern Croatia established on the basis of Erdut Agreement. As Serb community constitute majority of the population of the municipality it is represented by 2 delegated Councillors at the Assembly of the Joint Council of Municipalities, double the number of Councilors to the number from Serb minority municipalities in Eastern Croatia.

=== Municipal government ===
The municipality assembly is composed of 13 representatives. As of 2021, the member parties are:

Party	Number of votes	Number of seats
Independent Democratic Serb Party	1.205	8
Croatian Democratic Union	698	4
Workers' Front	141	1

=== Minority councils ===
Directly elected minority councils and representatives are tasked with consulting the local or regional authorities, advocating for minority rights and interests, integration into public life and participation in the management of local affairs. At the 2023 Croatian national minorities councils and representatives elections Hungarians and Serbs of Croatia each fulfilled legal requirements to elect 10 members municipal minority councils of the Erdut Municipality.

== Economy ==
Erdut development index is between 50 and 76% of the Croatian average, and is underdeveloped municipality which is statistically classified as the First Category Area of Special State Concern by the Government of Croatia.

== Culture ==
=== Points of Interest ===
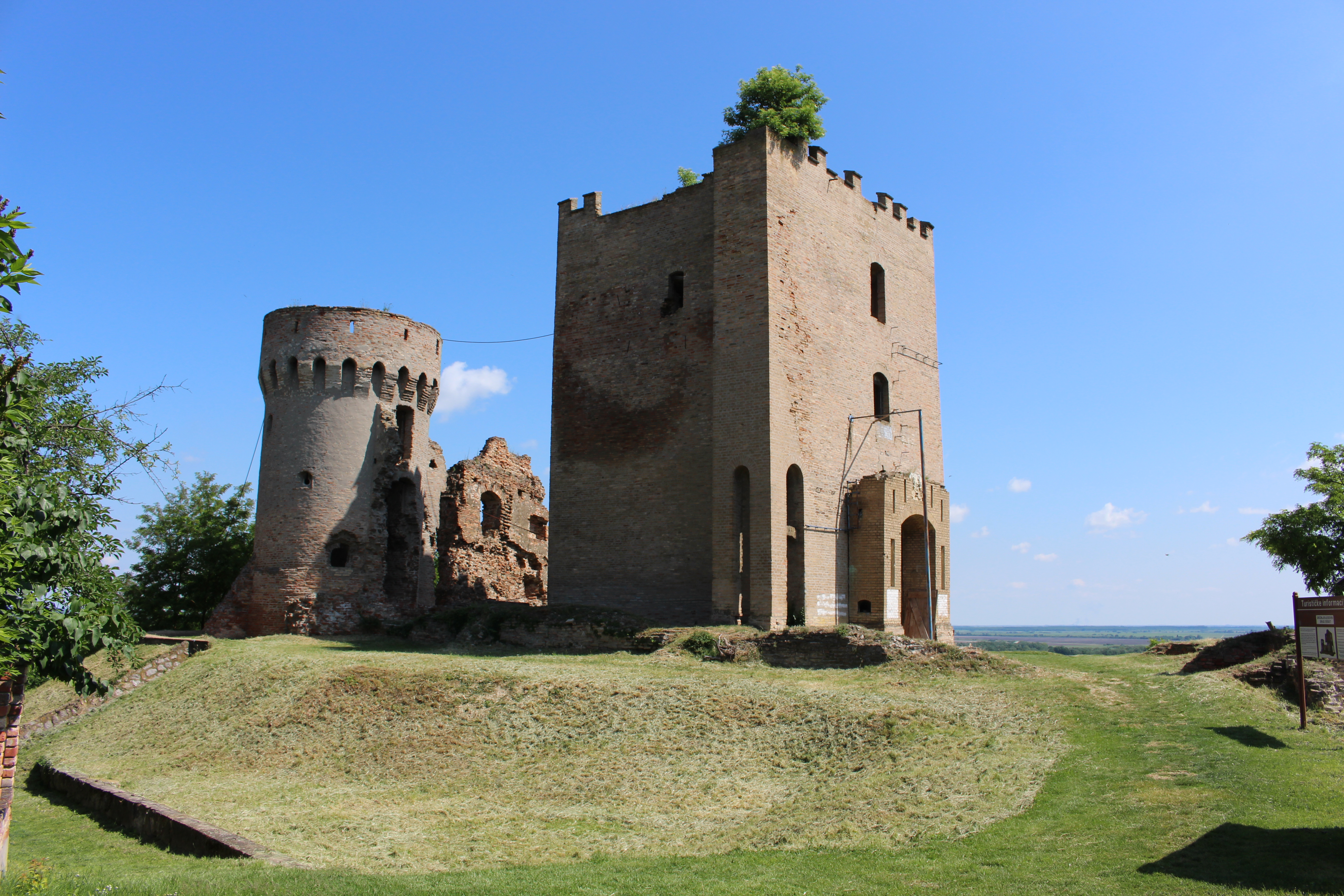
Erdut Castle

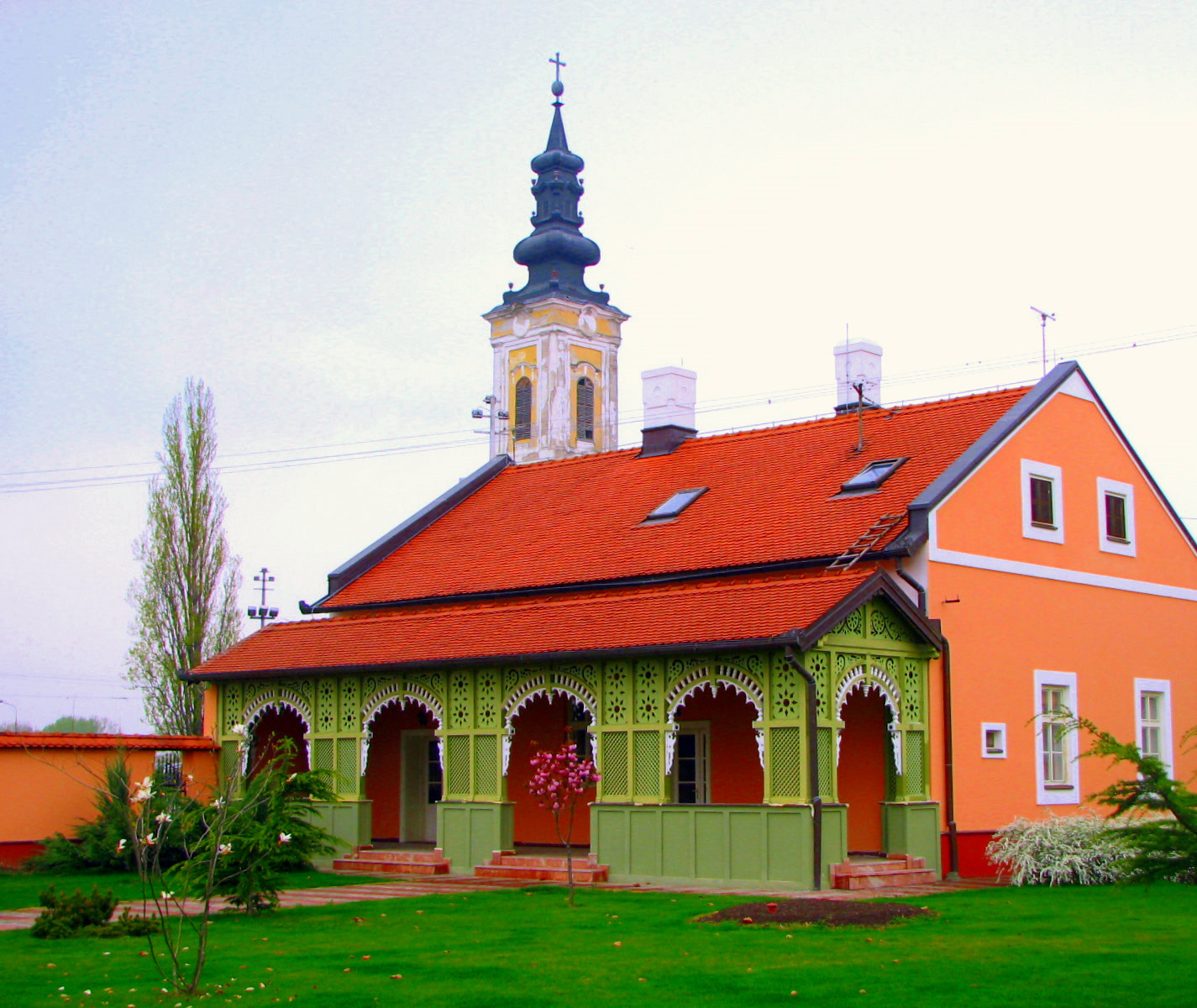
Serbian Orthodox Eparchy of Osječko polje and Baranja in Dalj

The municipality is home of Eparchy of Osječko polje and Baranja, and there is also Erdut Castle.

== Notable natives and residents ==
- Milutin Milanković, born in Dalj
- Anton Tittjung, World War II concentration camp guard, who was stripped of his U.S. citizenship for his wartime activities.

== See also ==
- Lordship of Erdut
- Erdut Agreement
- Osijek-Baranja County
- Slavonia
- Joint Council of Municipalities
- Cultural and Scientific Center "Milutin Milanković"
- High School Dalj
- List of Croatian municipalities with minority languages in official use

== Bibliography ==
- Poljak, Željko (February 1959). "Ostali krajevi Slavonije". Kazalo za "Hrvatski planinar" i "Naše planine" 1898—1958 (PDF). Naše planine. Vol. XI. p. 7. ISSN 0354-0650.
