= Dalj High School =

Coordinates: 45°29′24.5″N 18°59′25″E

- Srednja škola Dalj; Средња школа Даљ
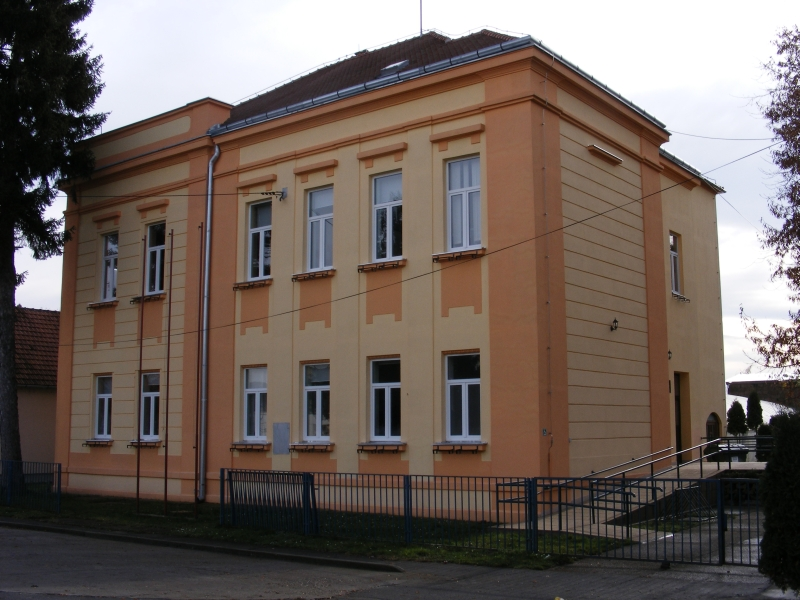
- Braće Radića Street 7 Dalj; Croatia

Information
- Type: Public
- Established: 1952
- Principal: Rajko Lukić
- Website: http://ss-dalj.skole.hr

Dalj High School (Croatian: Srednja škola Dalj, Serbian Cyrillic: Средња школа Даљ) is a public high school in Dalj, Croatia. The school offers the students the following educational programs: Economist, Commercial Officer (in Serbian), Agricultural Technician and Agricultural Technician General. In accordance with rights derived from Erdut Agreement Serbian minority in this school use right of education in minority language. For this reason, students can attend classes in Croatian or Serbian language and Serbian Cyrillic alphabet.

== Student cooperative ==
In the high school since the beginning of the nineties operates Student cooperative. On a voluntary basis students can participate in the work in orchard, greenhouse, wine cellar, hothouse, pond or apiary.

== See also ==
- Dalj
- Erdut Municipality
- Cultural and Scientific Center "Milutin Milanković"
- Education in Croatia
