= Dalj =

Dalj Даљ (Serbian)
- Village (Selo)
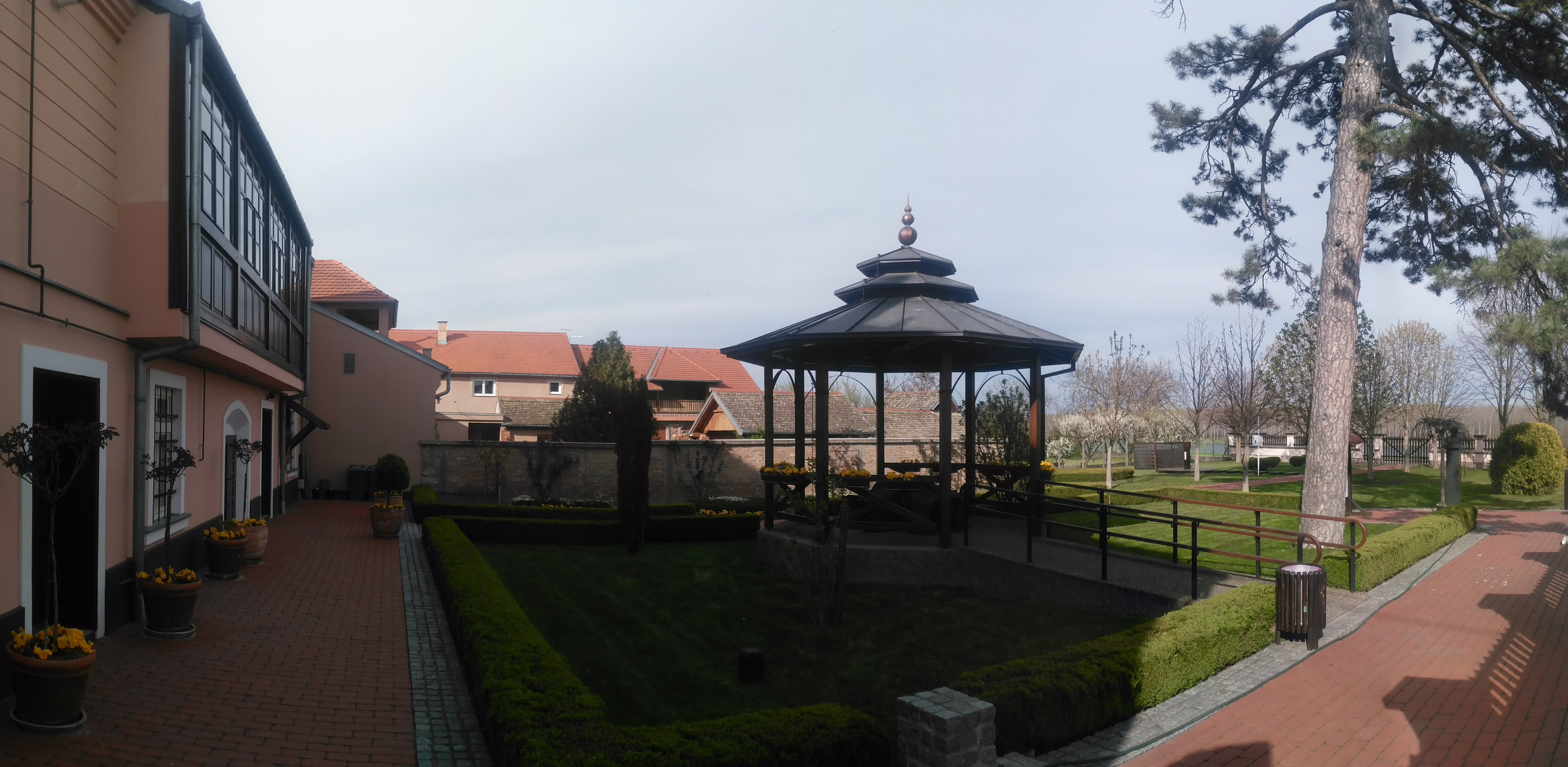
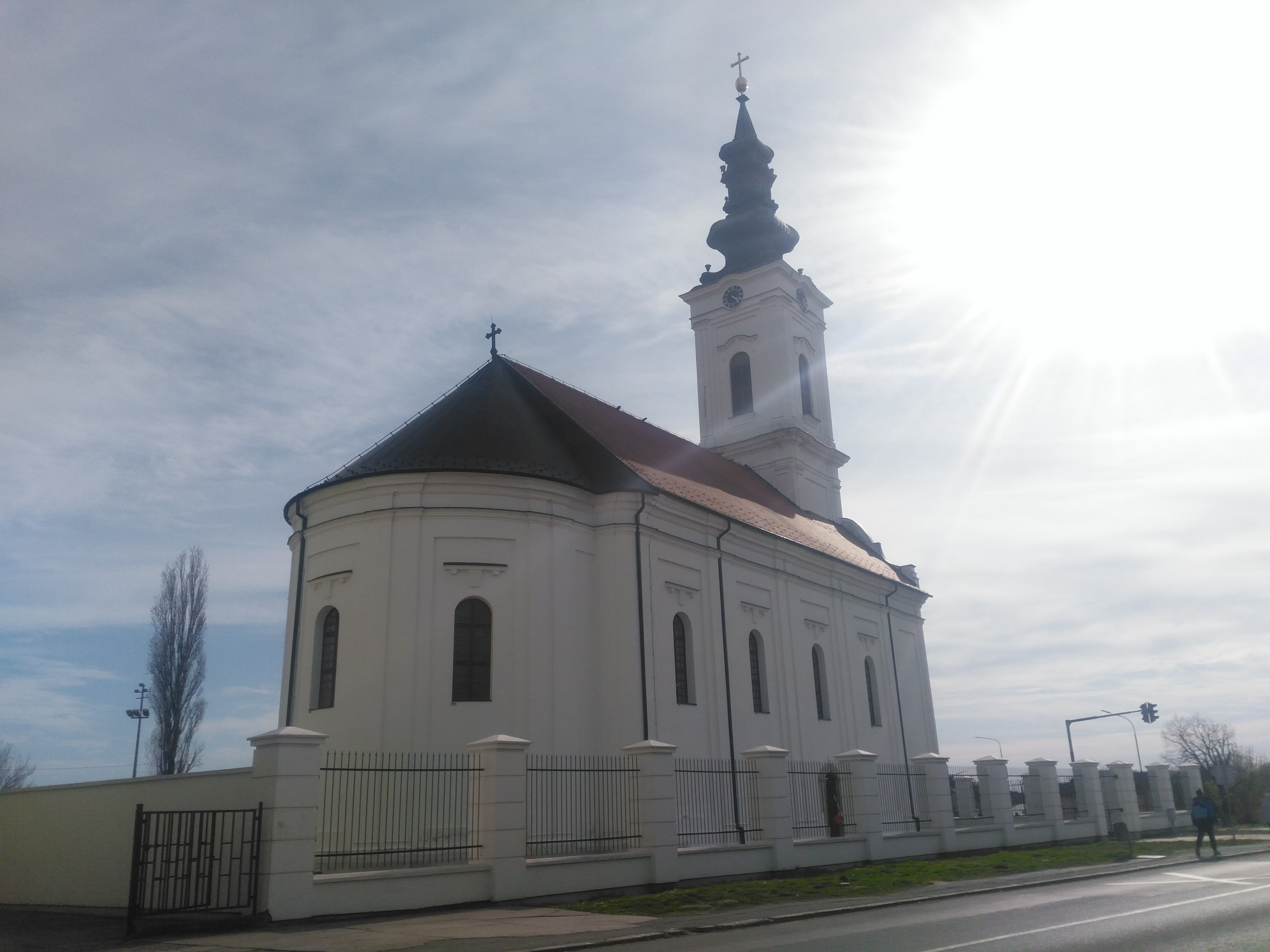
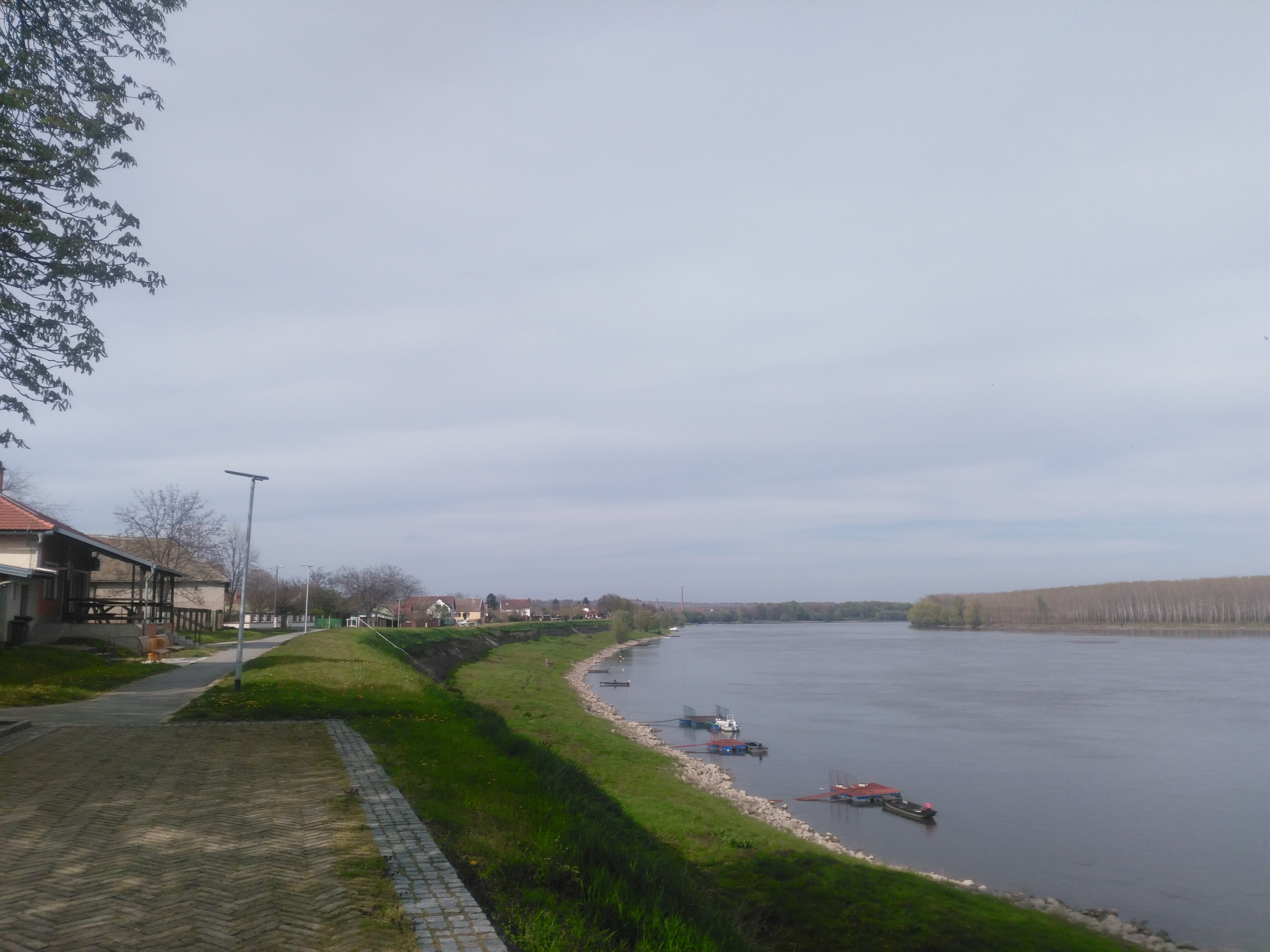
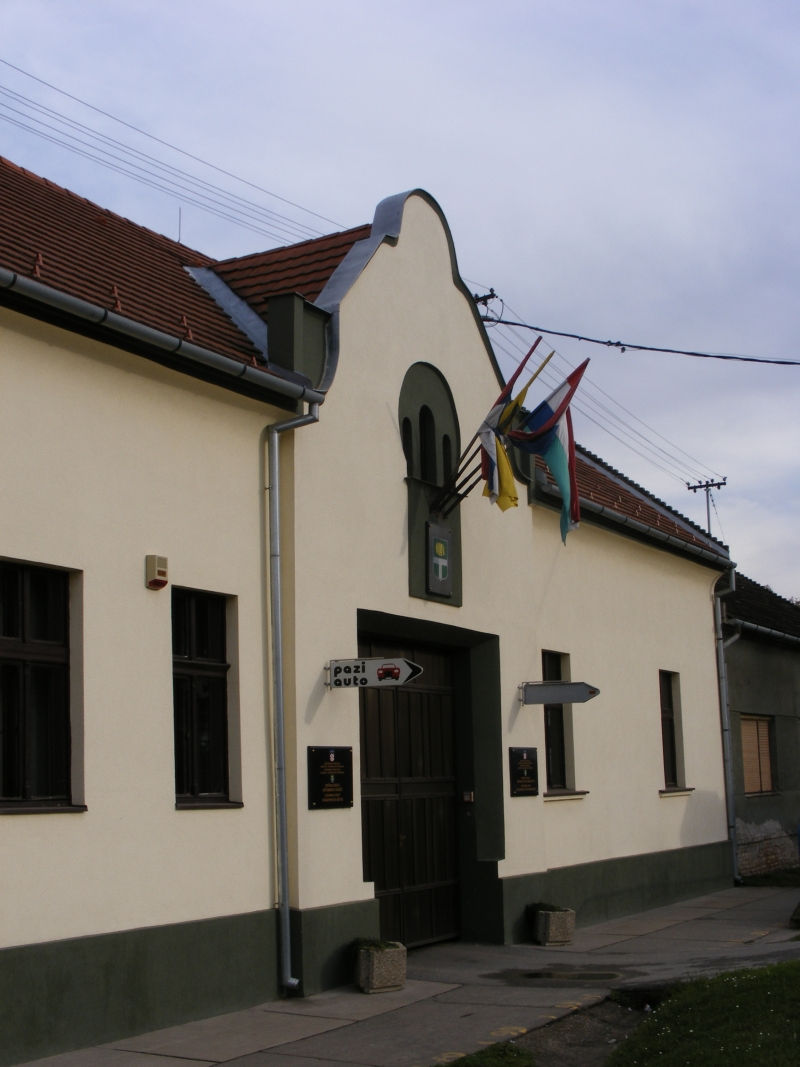
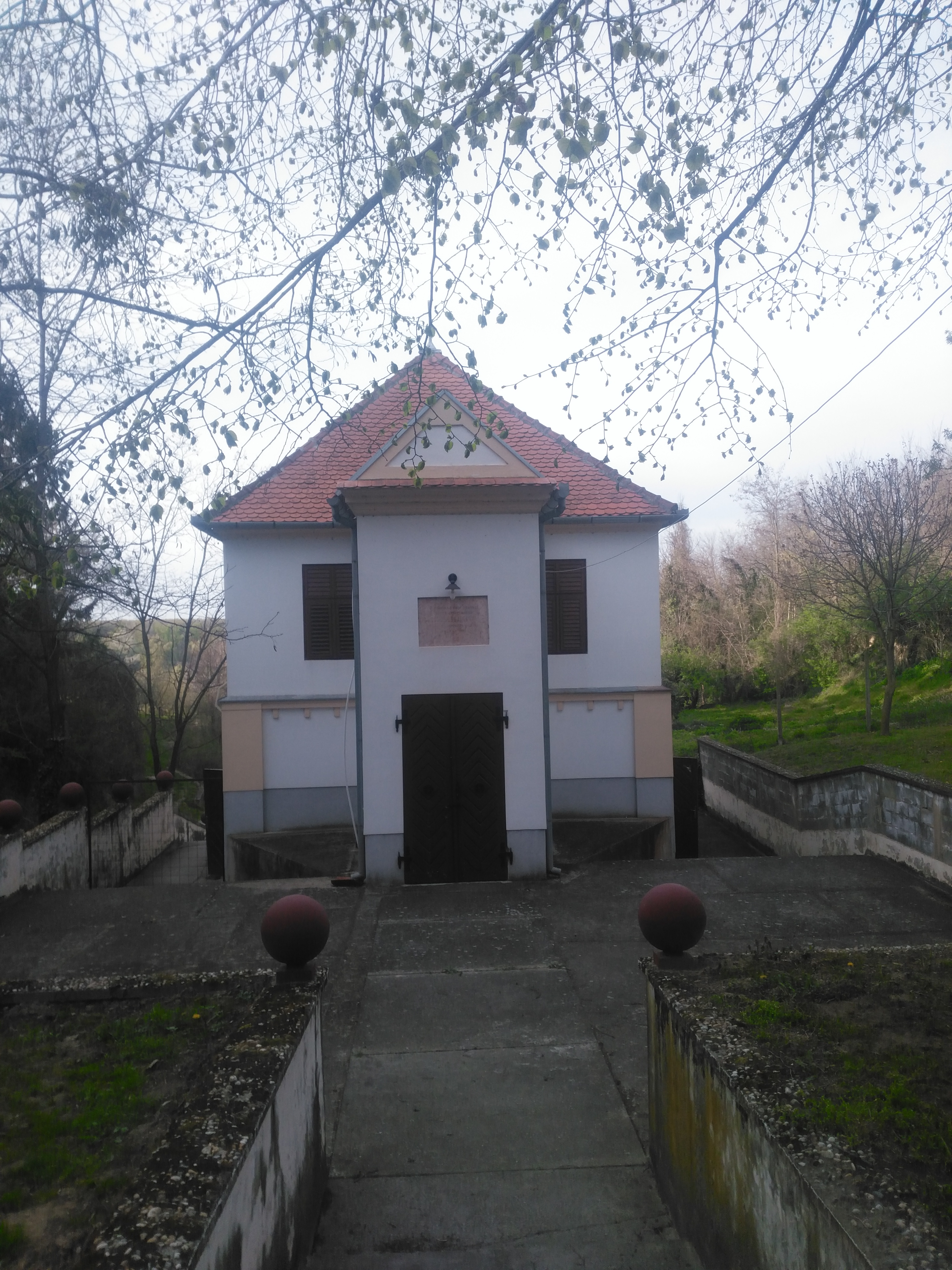
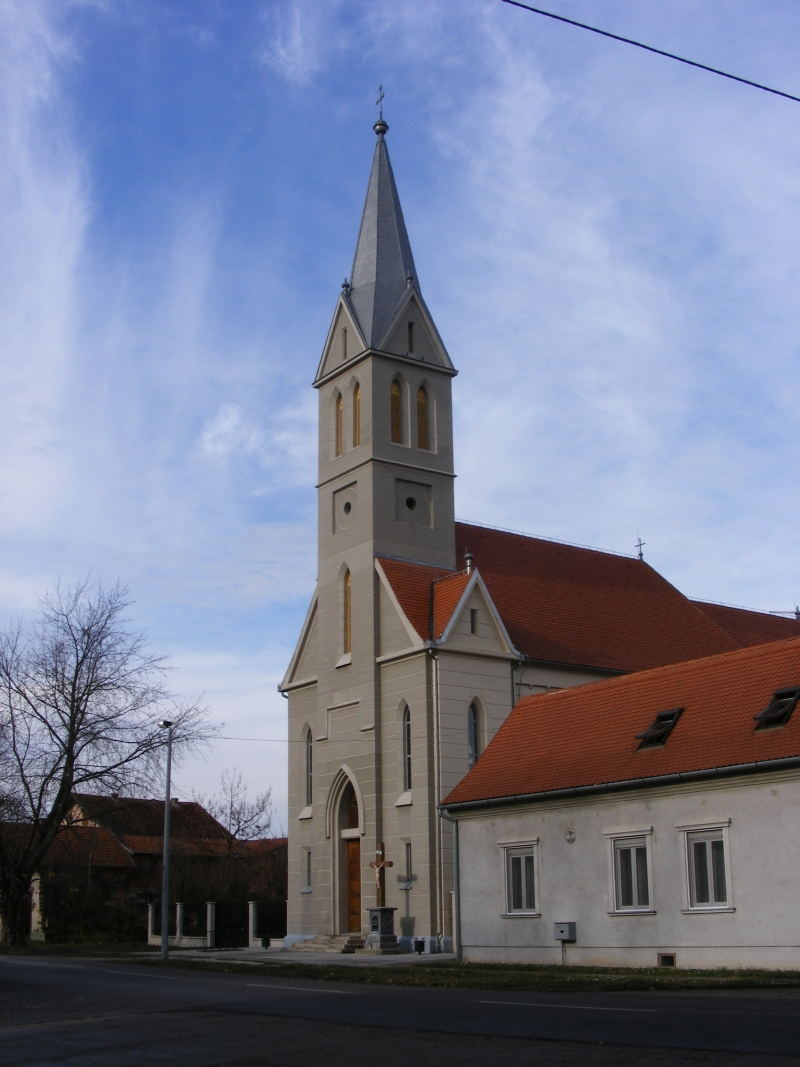
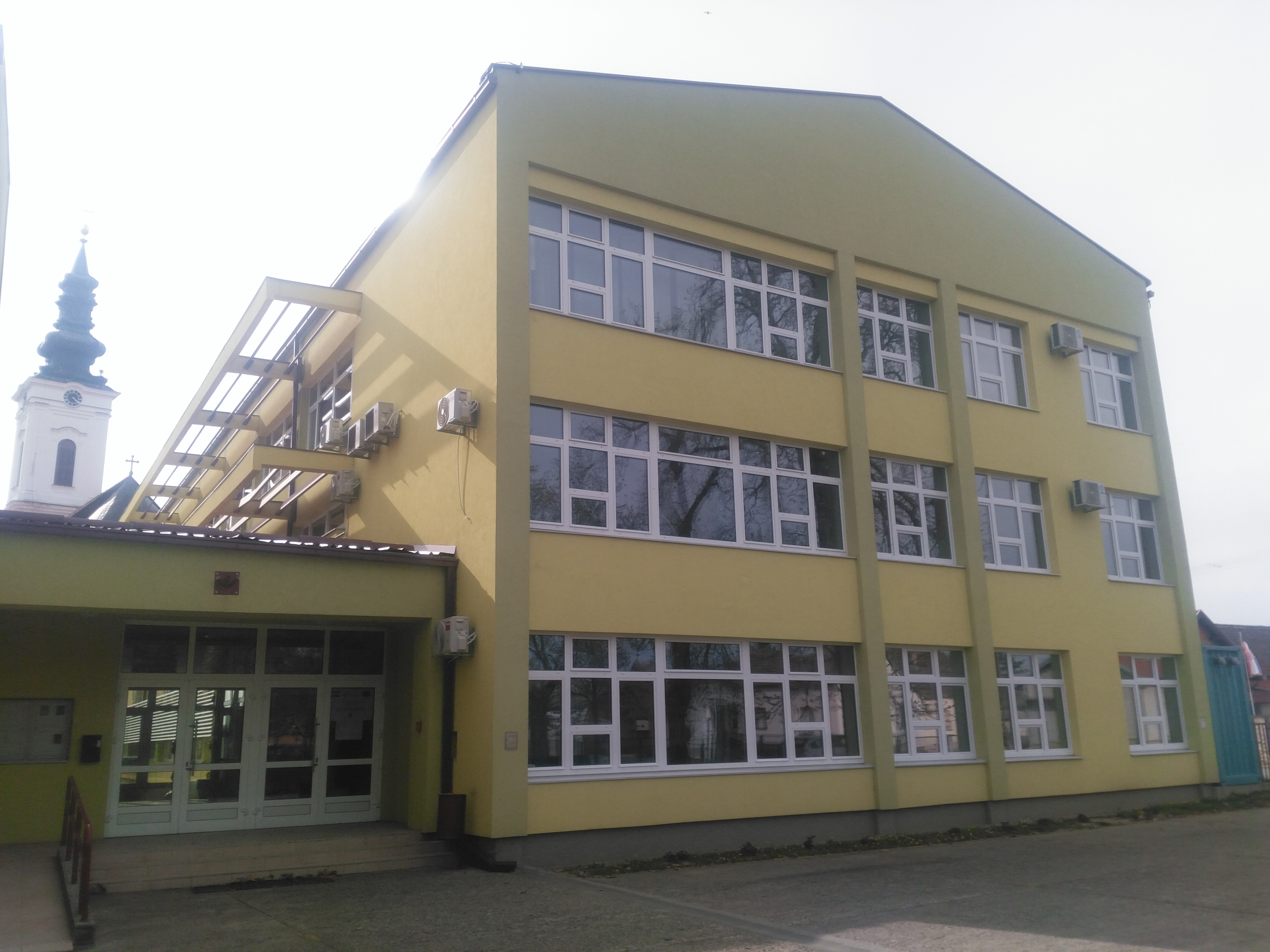
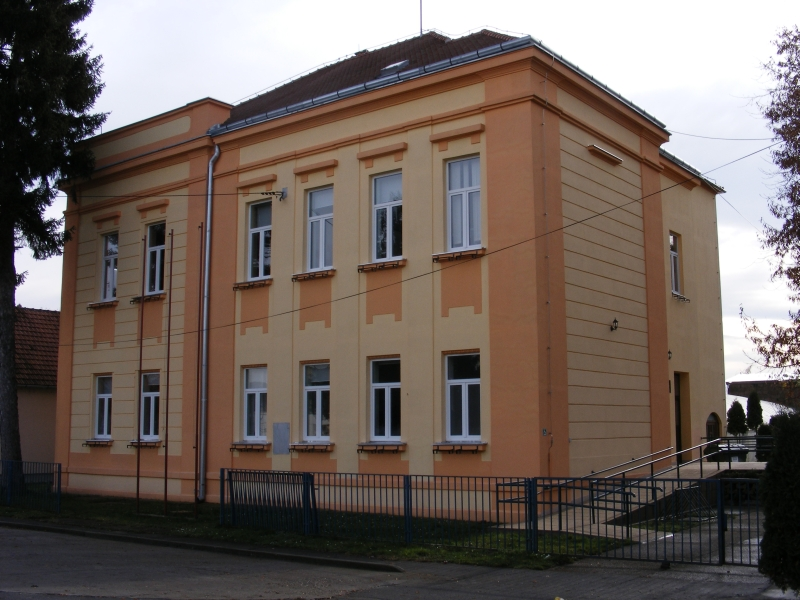
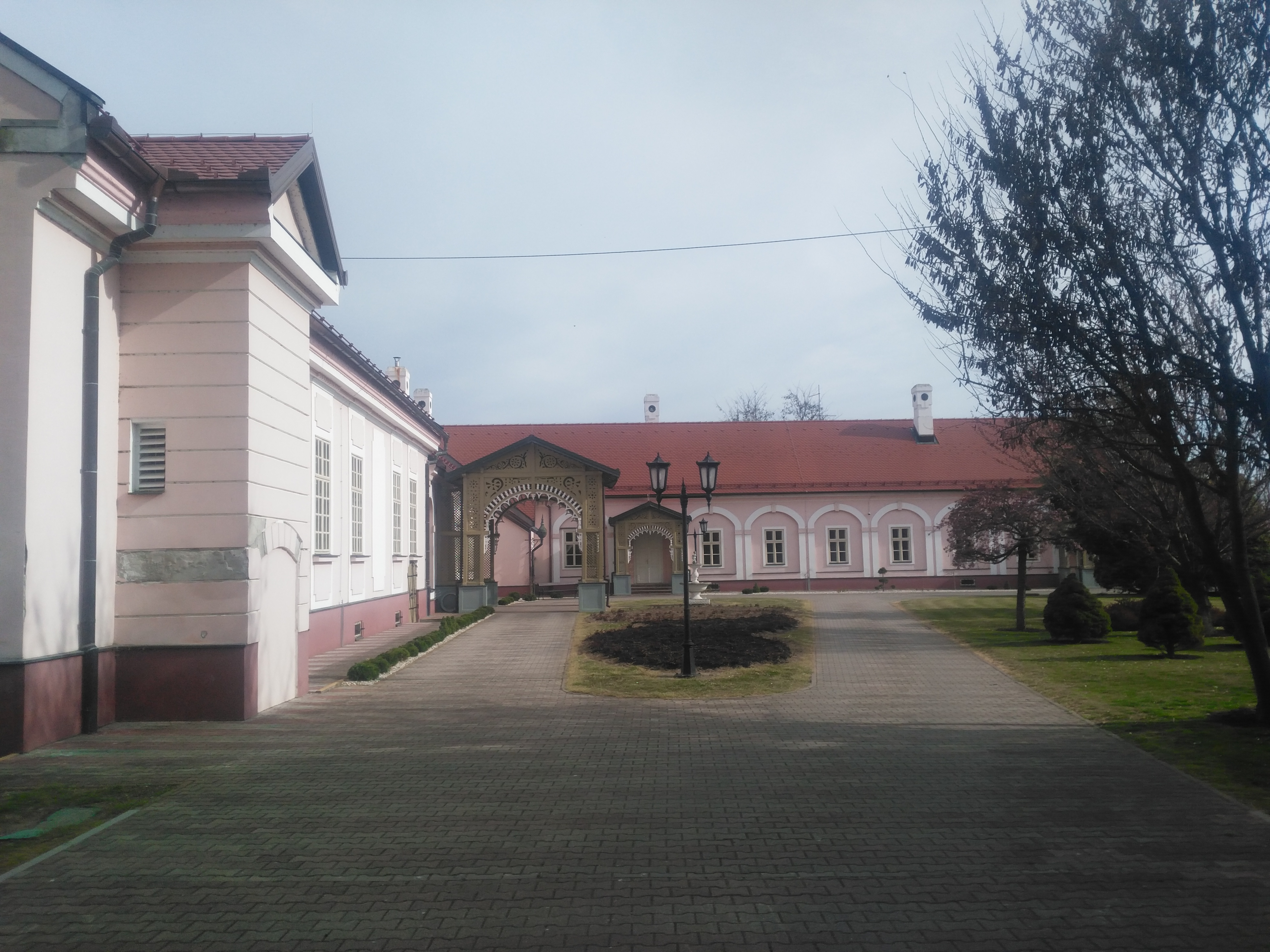
- Clockwise, from top: Cultural and Scientific Center "Milutin Milanković", Danube riverfront, Roman Catholic church, seat of the Eparchy of Osijek Plain and Baranya, Dalj High School, Dalj Elementary School, Municipal building, Saint Demetrius Cathedral, central image: Monastery of the Dormition of the Theotokos, Dalj Planina

- Location of Dalj in Osijek-Baranja County Dalj (Croatia) Dalj (Europe)
- Coordinates: 45°29′N 18°59′E
- Country: Croatia
- County: Osijek-Baranja
- Municipality: Erdut

Government
  - Body: Local Committee

Area
  - Total: 73.7 km^{2} (28.5 sq mi)

Population (2021)
  - Total: 2,877
  - Density: 39.0/km^{2} (101/sq mi)
- Demonym(s): Daljac (♂) Daljanka (♀) (per grammatical gender)
- Time zone: UTC+1 (CET)
  - Summer (DST): UTC+2 (CEST)
- Postal code: 31226
- Area code: +385 31
- Vehicle registration: OS
- Official languages: Croatian, Serbian

Dalj (Serbian Cyrillic: Даљ, Hungarian: Dálya, German: Dallia, Latin: Teutoburgium) is a village on the Danube in eastern Croatia, near the confluence of the Drava and Danube, on the border with Serbia. It is located on the D519 road, south of its intersection with the D213 road and the Vukovar–Erdut railway.

Administratively, it is a part of the municipality of Erdut, Osijek-Baranja County. Although the namesake of the municipality is the Erdut village, Dalj is the largest settlement of the municipality and its administrative, cultural and economic center.

== History ==
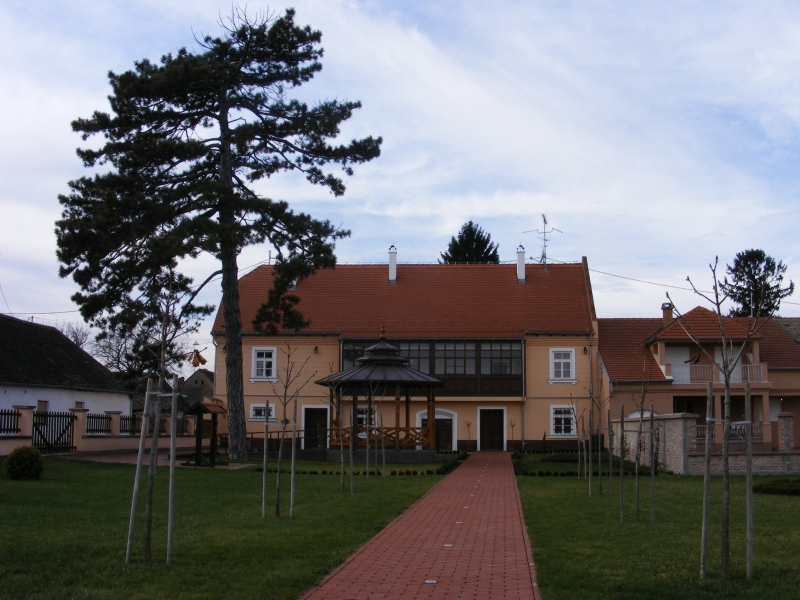
House in Dalj where Milutin Milanković was born

One Scordisci archaeological site in Dalj dating back to late La Tène culture was excavated in the 1970s and 1980s as a part of rescue excavations in eastern Croatia. The archaeological site was a part of the settlement network of Scordisci in the area of Vinkovci.

Following Ottoman retreat from the region the Lordship of Dalj was established, and the village became seat of its domains.

=== Croatian War of Independence ===
During the Croatian War of Independence, the village became the site of the Dalj massacre - killing of 39 prisoners of war in August 1991. The prisoners were Croatian policemen, Croatian National Guard troops and Civil defencemen and killed after the Yugoslav People's Army and Serbian paramilitaries captured Dalj on 1 August. Goran Hadžić, Croatian Serb political leader at the time, was charged with war crimes by the International Criminal Tribunal for the former Yugoslavia (ICTY) in relation to these atrocities.

The ICTY also charged Hadžić with illegal detention of hundreds of civilians in Dalj police station and a hangar near village's railway station. The detainees were beaten and otherwise physically abused. After Hadžić was diagnosed with a terminal illness, his trial was discontinued in 2015. He died in July 2016.

== Demographics ==
According to the 2011 census the Erdut municipality (part of which is Dalj) has a population of 7,308. The municipal population consists of Serbs (55.56%), Croats (37.96%) and Hungarians (5.06%).

== Education ==
=== Secondary ===
Dalj High School is public high school in Dalj. School offers students the following educational programs: Economist, Commercial Officer (in Serbian), Agricultural Technician and Agricultural Technician General.

== Notable natives and residents ==
- Dimitrije Isailović, professor and newspaper editor
- Jovan Isailović Jr., 19th century painter
- Milutin Milanković, Serbian scientist
- Vasilije Trbić, Serbian Chetnik commander
- Časlav Ocić, Serbian economist and academician
- Danica Tomić, the first woman pilot in Yugoslavia
- Alexander Cvijanović, Yugoslav-American architect

== See also ==
- Saint Demetrius Cathedral
- Cultural and Scientific Center "Milutin Milanković"
- Dalj High School
- Dalj massacre
