= Erdut Castle =

Medieval castle in Erdut, Croatia

- Erdutska kula (Croatian); Ердутска кула (Serbian)
- Near Erdut in Croatia
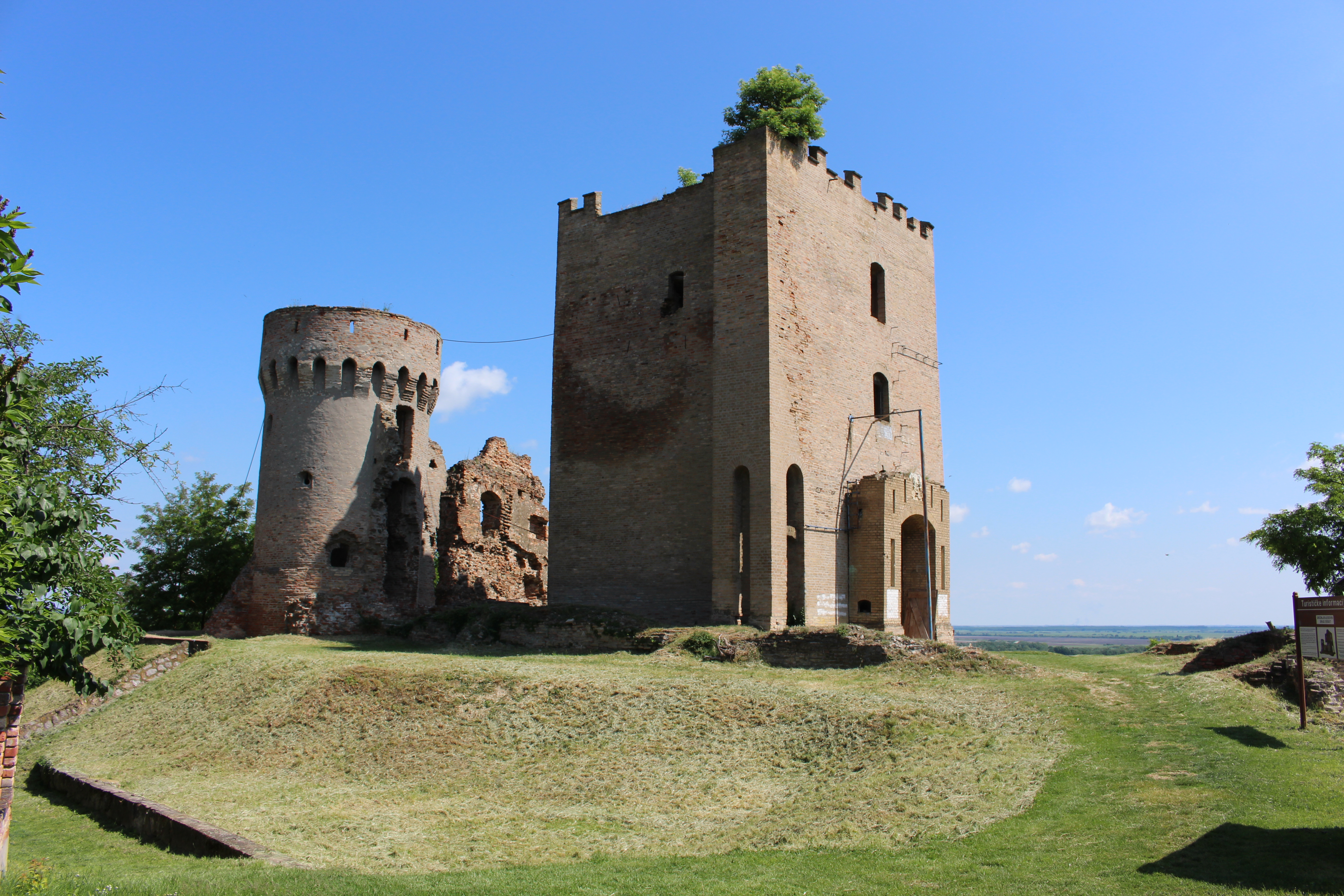
- Erdut Castle

Site information
- Type: fortified castle

Location
- Location within Croatia
- Coordinates: 45.526703°N 19.064180°E

Site history
- Built: XIV century

Garrison information
- Designations: protected material cultural heritage

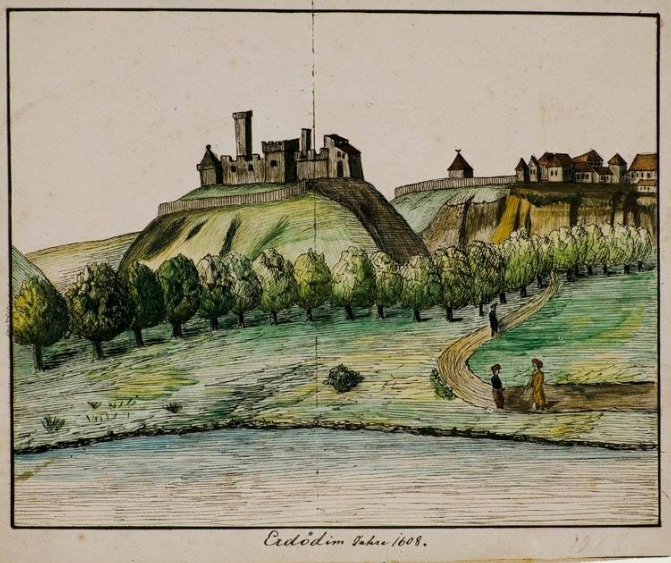
1608 Prendstteter's representation of the Castle.

Erdut Castle (Croatian: Erdutska kula, Serbian: Ердутска кула, Erdutska kula, Hungarian: Erdődi vár) is a castle in Erdut, Croatia.

The castle lies on a bluff 70 metres above the Danube. The surrounding area below the bluff is completely flat, which provided an excellent view of any marauding hordes invading from the east.

While the settlement of Erdut is dated to the 14th century, the castle is first mentioned in a 1499 document as a Bánffy family estate, built likely after the fall of Constantinople. The castle fell to the Ottoman Empire in the 16th century, and remained under their control until 1687.

The castle was damaged in July 1991, during the Croatian War of Independence, in an artillery attack launched by the Yugoslav People's Army (JNA). In the aftermath of the attack, Croatian authorities sent a list of Croatia's cultural monuments marked with the protective sign of the Hague Convention for the Protection of Cultural Property in the Event of Armed Conflict to the Yugoslav Defence Ministry and all JNA headquarters.

The 1.3 million kunas reconstruction of the site funded from the European Regional Development Fund was announced in late July 2022.
