= Aljmaš, Croatia =

Aljmaš
- Village (Selo)
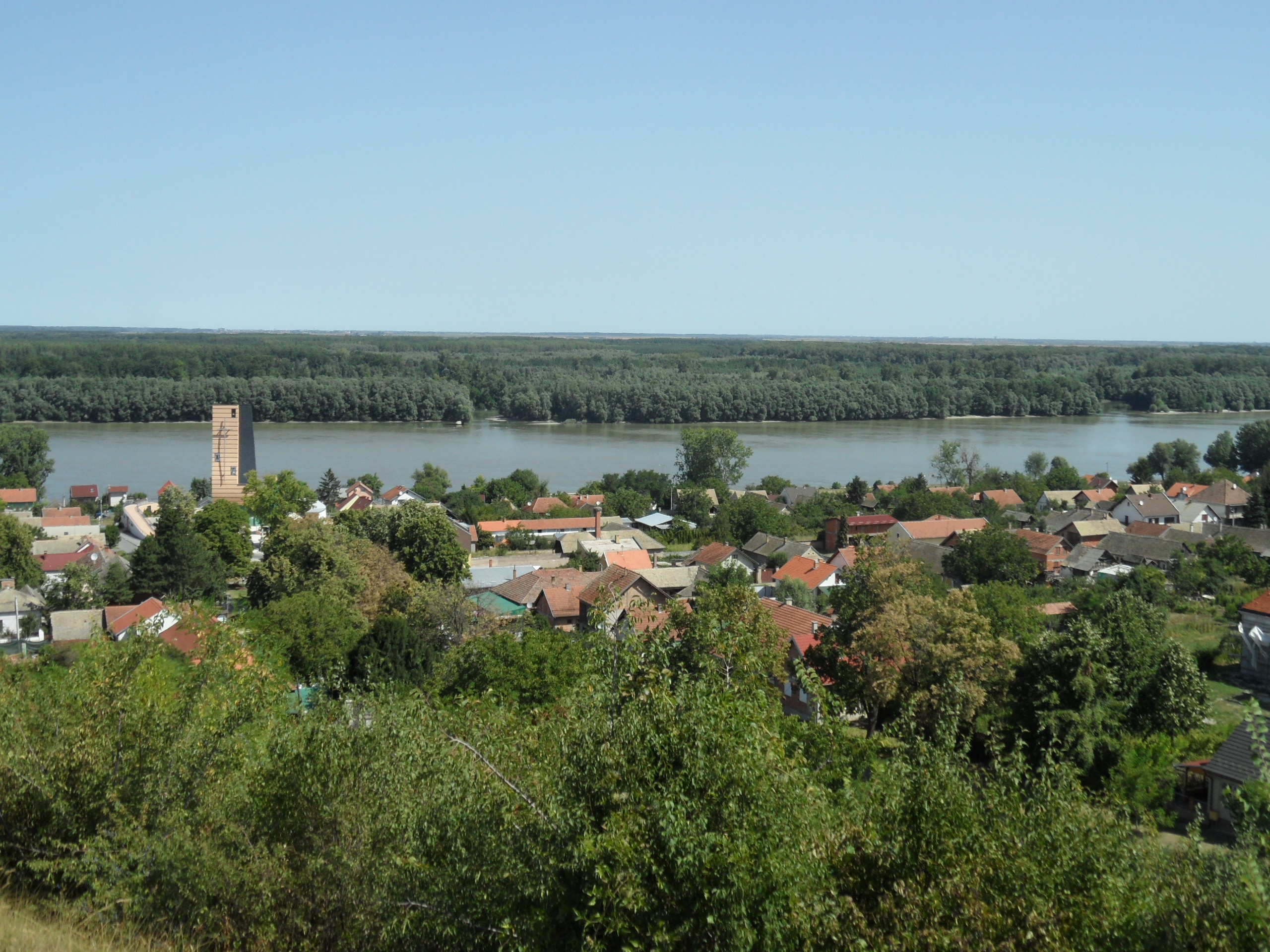

- Location within Osijek-Baranja County Location within Croatia Location within Europe
- Coordinates: 45.529458°N 18.949955°E
- Country: Croatia
- County: Osijek-Baranja
- Municipality: Erdut

Government
  - Body: Local Committee

Area
  - Total: 15.2 km^{2} (5.9 sq mi)

Population (2021)
  - Total: 481
  - Density: 31.6/km^{2} (82.0/sq mi)
- Demonym(s): Aljmašanin (♂) Aljmašanka (♀) (per grammatical gender)
- Time zone: UTC+1 (CET)
  - Summer (DST): UTC+2 (CEST)

Aljmaš (Hungarian: Almás, German: Apfeldorf) is a village in the Erdut municipality in eastern Croatia. Aljmaš lies on the right bank of the Danube.

== History ==
Aljmaš was reportedly the sight of a Marian apparition and since 1704, a significant number of believers and tourists make a pilgrimage here annually. A Catholic Church in the name of Our Lady of Laus and Our Lady of Consolation was constructed in 1864. During the Croatian War of Independence, the Roman Catholic church in Aljmaš was destroyed and rebuilt almost completely in 2006.

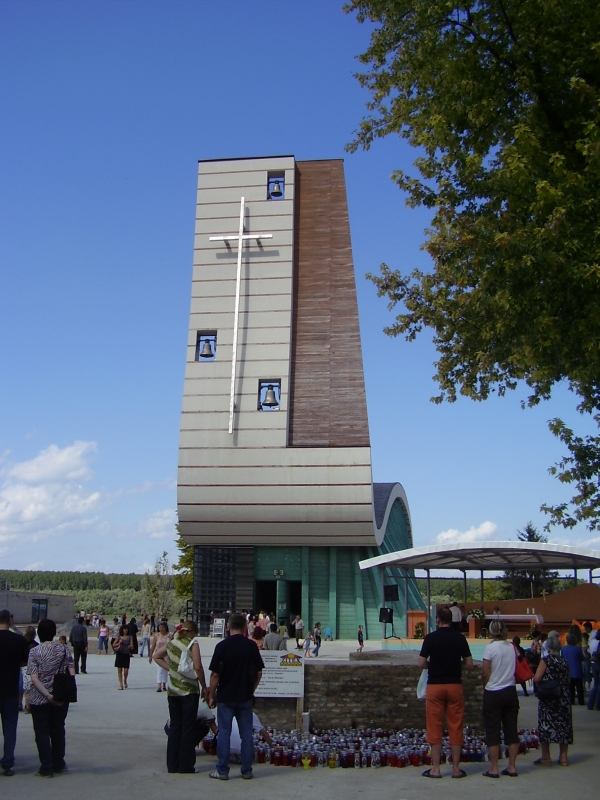
The rebuilt Marian church in Aljmaš has an unusual shape and facade.

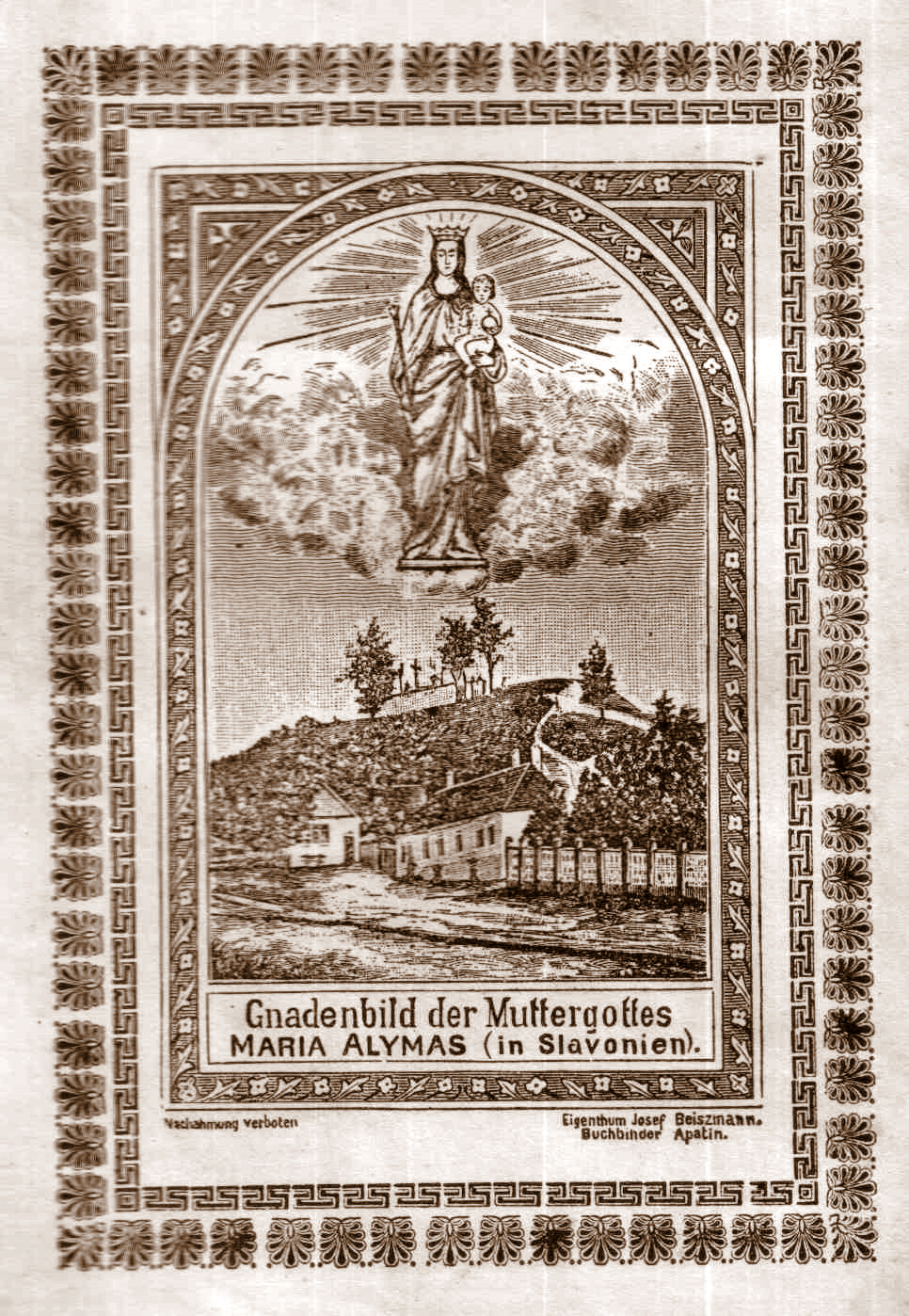
Old picture of the Aljmas Statue

== See also ==
- Erdut Municipality
