= Cultural and Scientific Center "Milutin Milanković" =

- Kulturni i znanstveni centar "Milutin Milanković (Croatian); Културни и научни центар "Милутин Миланковић" (Serbian)

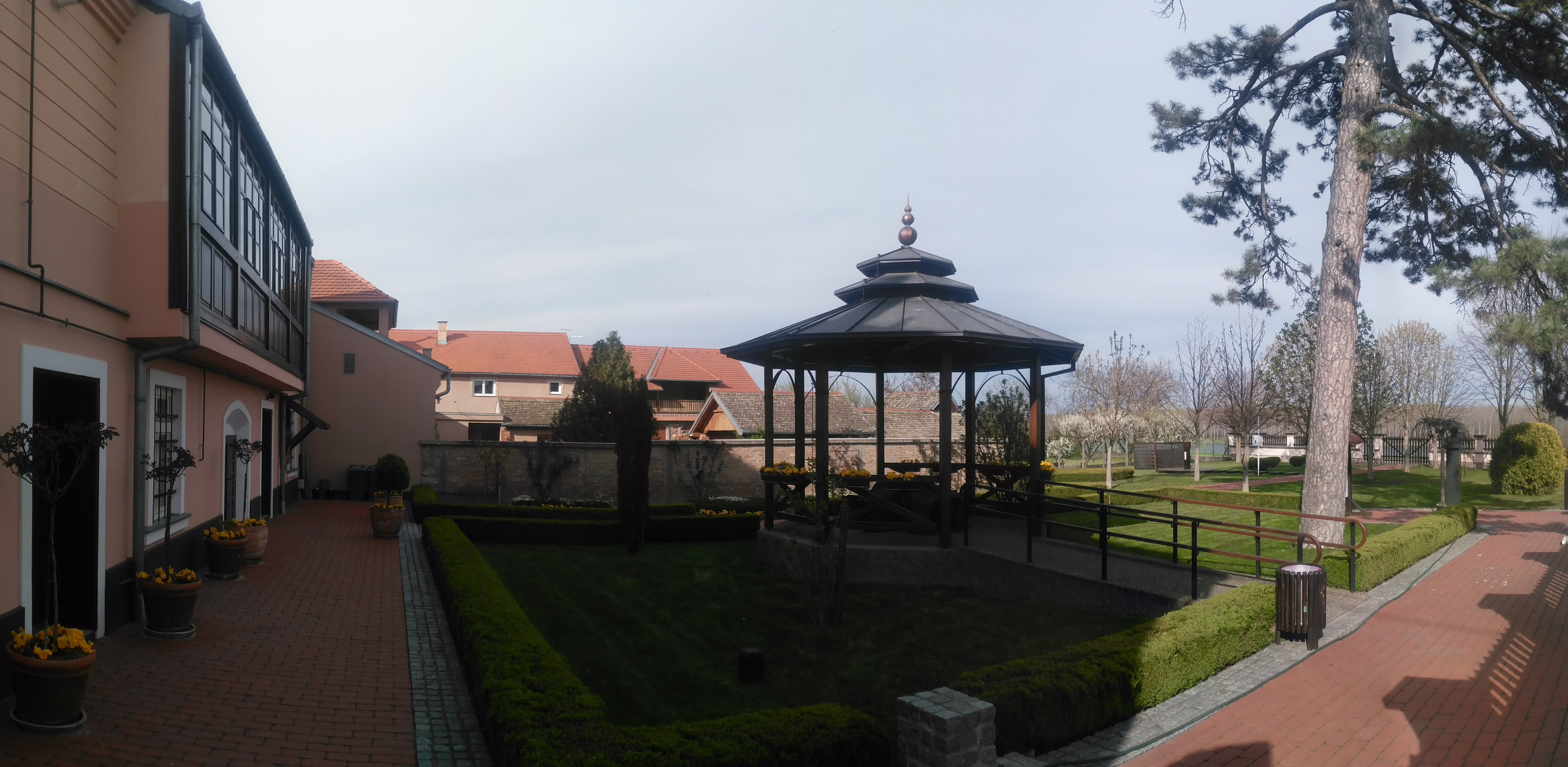
- Center's garden on the Danube riverfront
- Established: 2009
- Location: Dalj, Croatia
- Coordinates: 45.485719850655705°N 18.989359705761753°E
- Director: Đorđe Nešić
- Website: kzcmm.hr

The Cultural and Scientific Center "Milutin Milanković" (Croatian: Kulturni i znanstveni centar "Milutin Milanković", Serbian Cyrillic: Културни и научни центар "Милутин Миланковић") is a public cultural and educational institution in Dalj in eastern Croatia. The Center promotes the legacy of Milutin Milanković, Serbian mathematician, astronomer, climatologist, geophysicist, civil engineer and popularizer of science. It also organizes cultural events and exhibitions, issue publications, audiovisual and promotional materials, preserve traditional heritage, organize cultural and scientific meetings, promote sustainable development and popularize science. In 2012 the Center was visited by more than 5,000 visitors.

The Center is located in the birth house of Milutin Milanković. After the end of the Croatian War of Independence and the end of United Nations Transitional Administration for Eastern Slavonia, Baranja and Western Sirmium mission house remained in deteriorating conditions up until the 2006. At that time Municipality initiated establishment of the center which will serve as the meeting point for students coming from both banks of Danube River, both Croatia and Serbia.

== Building ==
Alongside Center's main building other venues are occasionally used to host a variety of events. The 131'st anniversary of Milutin Milanković's birth was marked in May 2010 with a series of activities. In 2011 the Center participated in the cross-border cooperation project "From people to people" with participants including the Municipality of Erdut, the City Library of Sombor, the Cultural Center "Laza Kostić" Sombor, and the Provincial Secretariat for International Cooperation of Vojvodina. Project was financed from the European Union funds.

According to Center's Statute, along with Croatian, Serbian language and Serbian cyrillic alphabet is used officially as well.

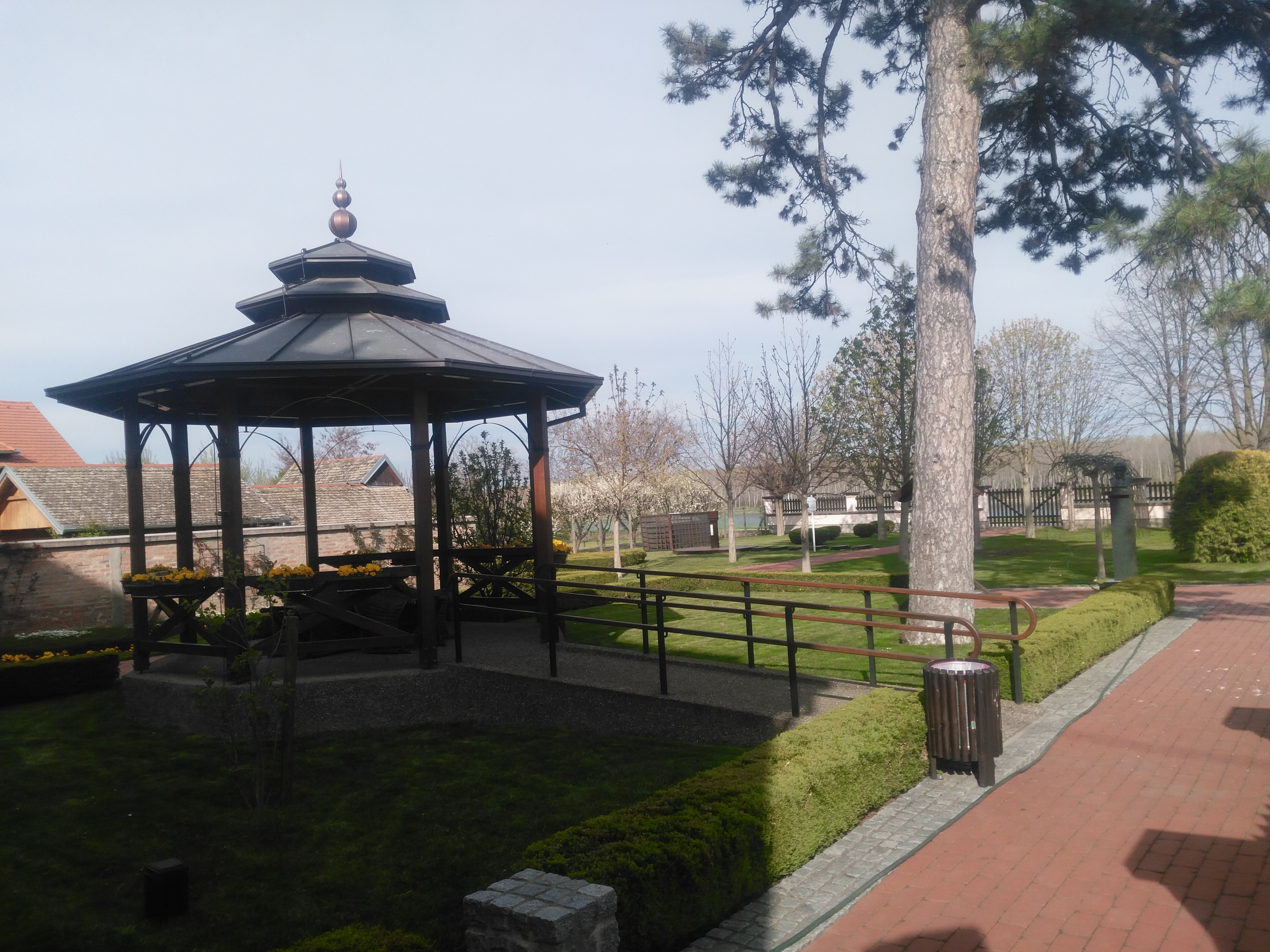

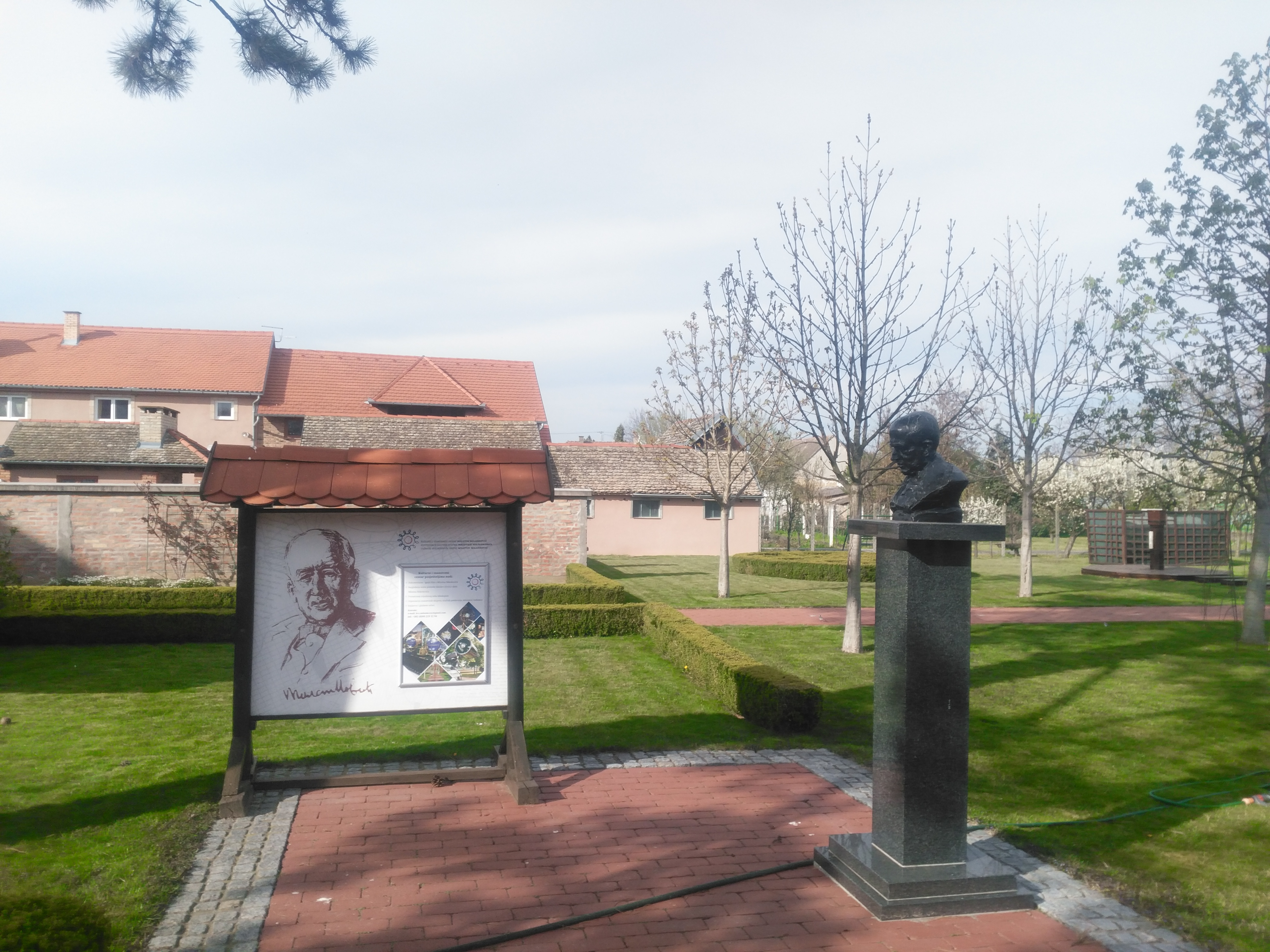

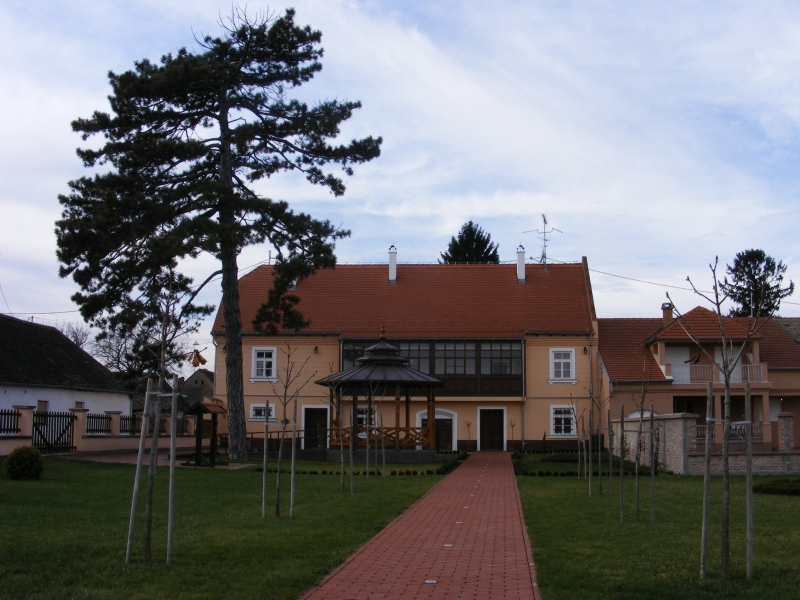

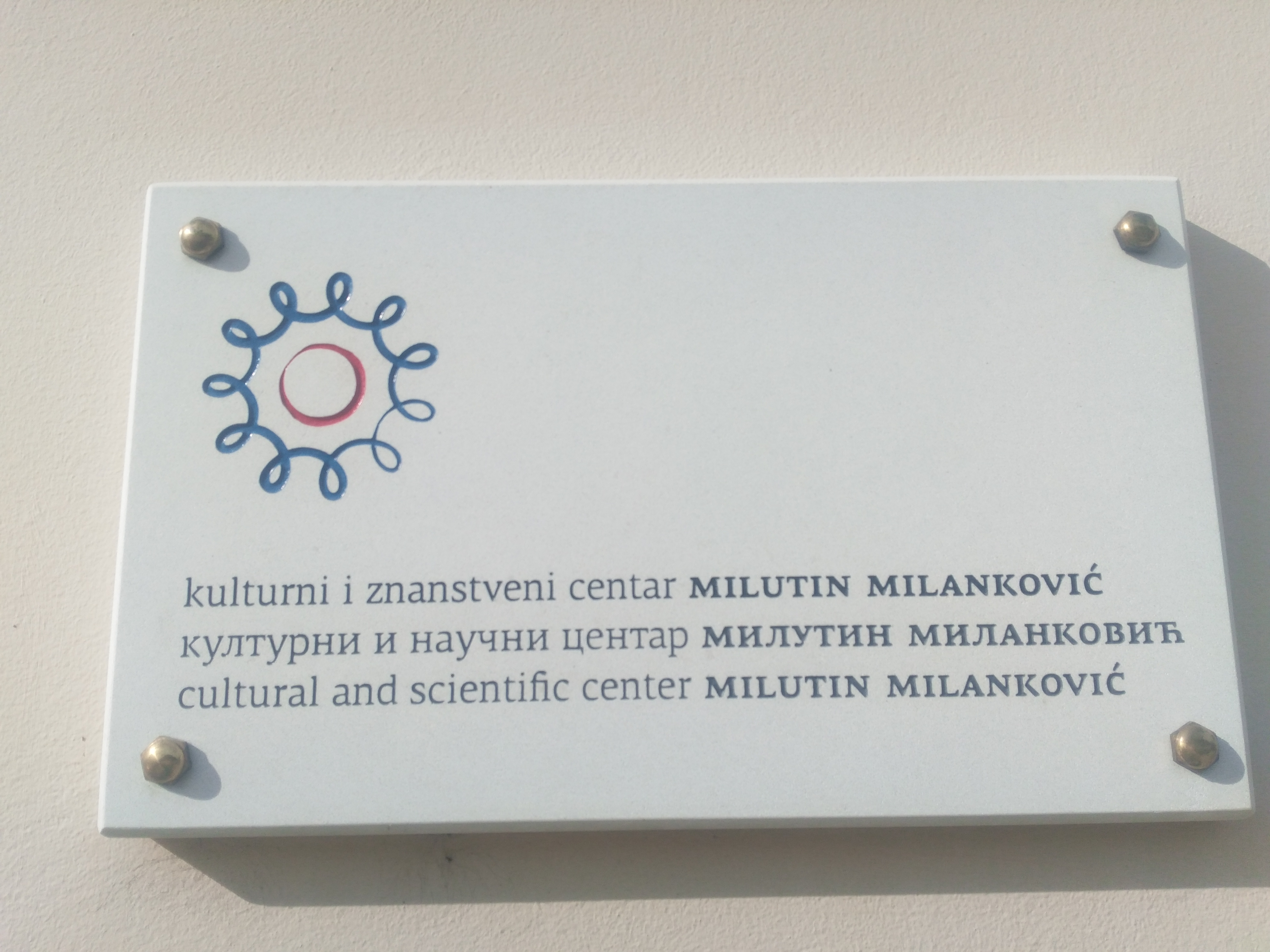

== See also ==
- Milutin Milanković
- Dalj High School
