= City and University Library in Osijek =

Library in Osijek, Croatia

City and University Library of Osijek
- Gradska i sveučilišna knjižnica Osijek

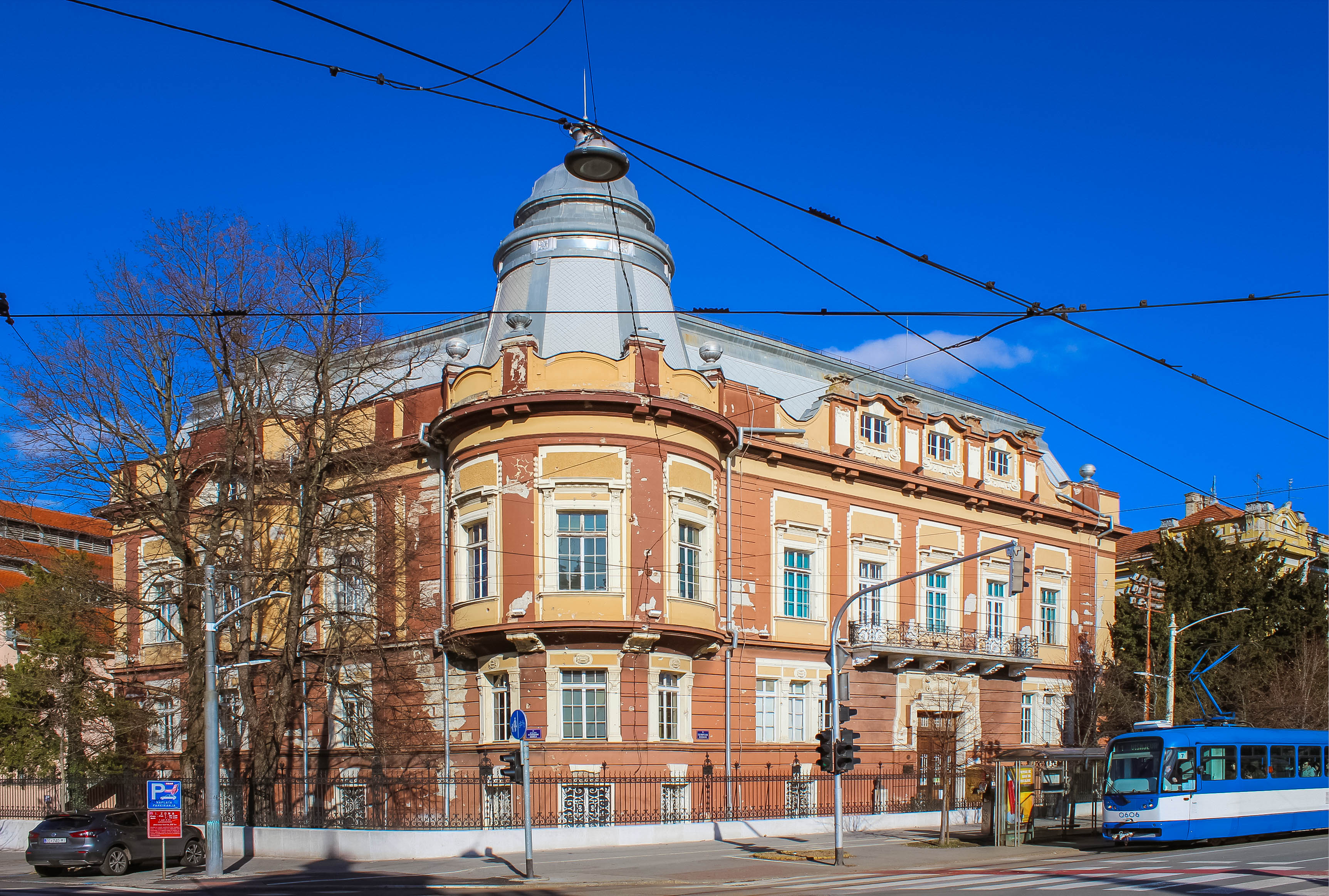
- The library is located in the Gillming-Hengl Building
- 45.561187°N 18.682809°E
- Location: Osijek, Croatia
- Type: City and university library
- Established: 8 February 1949; 77 years ago

Collection
- Legal deposit: Yes, since 1961

Other information
- Website: www.gskos.unios.hr

The City and University Library of Osijek (Croatian: Gradska i sveučilišna knjižnica Osijek) serves as the principal library of the city of Osijek, largest city and the economic and cultural centre of Slavonia. The institution is the central library of the University of Osijek as well. The library's collection contains over 422,790 volumes and circulates 325, 836 items per year, making it one of the biggest library in Slavonia and one of the bigger ones in Croatia. As a legal deposit library, the library is entitled to receive copies of all works published in Croatia. Library fulfils its depository function in coordination with the central depository National and University Library in Zagreb.

== History ==
Tradition of public and popular libraries and reading rooms in Osijek can be traced back to the mid-19th century. The modern day library was established after the end of World War II in Yugoslavia in 1949 by the City People's Committee of Osijek. The new library incorporated the Library of the City People's Committee of Upper Town (established in December 1947) and the Library of the City People's Committee of Lower Town (established in 1948).

In 1961, the library received the privilege of obtaining the legal deposit of published materials, following a decree from the Council for Culture and Science of the People's Republic of Croatia. This allowed the library to receive one copy of all printed or otherwise reproduced works distributed in Croatia. While the library was designated as a public national library rather than a scientific library, it became one of only two libraries in continental Croatia (alongside the National and University Library in Zagreb) to hold this status. Throughout the 1960s, the library modernized by adopting international standards in library operations, including the Universal Decimal Classification.

The name was changed to The City and University Library of Osijek in 1975 when the University of Osijek was established.

During the Croatian War of Independence in 1991, the City and University Library in Osijek was targeted by Yugoslav People's Army artillery, causing the significant damage to its central building. Most of the collection had been relocated to safety in time before the shelling took place. Although the city was under direct military danger the library continued to work under conditions akin to a state of war without suspending its services for a single day. In the same period, Croatian libraries, including Osijek's, were affected by large-scale removals of books that targeted works for anti-communist ideological reasons or because they were associated with the ethnic Serbs and the former Yugoslavia in which 13.8 percent of all library holdings in Croatia were removed or destroyed.

Starting in 1992, under the program of the Ministry of Culture of the Republic of Croatia, the library began systematically acquiring books for the needs of public libraries in the temporarily occupied areas of self-proclaimed SAO Eastern Slavonia, Baranja and Western Syrmia, specifically supporting the city libraries of Beli Manastir, Vukovar and Ilok. Following the signing of the Erdut Agreement and the completion of the peaceful reintegration of the region with the support of the UNTAES administration, all of this material was transferred to the ownership of the respective libraries.

== Organisational structure ==
=== Austrian Reading Room ===
The Austrian Reading Room (German: Österreichische Lesesaal) is a specialized branch of the City and University Library in Osijek, opened in 1995 in cooperation with the Austrian Ministry of Foreign Affairs. Collaboration between the City and University Library in Osijek and the Austrian Cultural Forum was initiated in 1988, coinciding with the earliest proposals for the establishment of the Austrian library in Osijek. By 1990, an agreement had been reached whereby the Croatian side undertook to secure the premises and equipment, while the Austrian side committed to supplying the library collection. The Austrian Reading Room serves students and faculty of German studies, pupils and teachers at primary and secondary schools, members of the Croatian-Austrian Society, and all users of the City and University Library Osijek interested in exploring the cultural and historical heritage of the Republic of Austria.

The Austrian Reading Room is the officially designated central library for Austrian national minority in Croatia and part of the international Österreich-Bibliotheken im Ausland network. Its purpose is to provide access to books and other information sources in German for members of the Austrians of Croatia and to support the preservation, promotion, and appreciation of their cultural and national heritage.

The holdings of the Austrian Reading Room encompass a broad spectrum of disciplines with a strong emphasis on the history of the Austria-Hungarian and the Republic of Austria. The collection is particularly rich in Austrian literature, including both canonical works by authors such as Ingeborg Bachmann, Thomas Bernhard, Peter Handke, Elfriede Jelinek, Rainer Maria Rilke and Arthur Schnitzler, as well as contemporary literature. The library offers significant resources on Austrian visual arts, architecture, and film, complemented by the collected works of prominent Austrian philosophers and key figures in psychology and psychoanalysis.

=== Local libraries in the City and University Library in Osijek network ===
The main branch of the library is located at European Avenue number 24. It operates four city branches local branch libraries in Donji Grad, Industrijska četvrt, Jug II and Retfala as well a bibliobus service with seven stops in Josipovac, Višnjevac, Tenja, Sarvaš and Klisa.

== See also ==
- National and University Library in Zagreb
