= Nikola Arsenović =

Tailor and ethnographer (1823–1887)

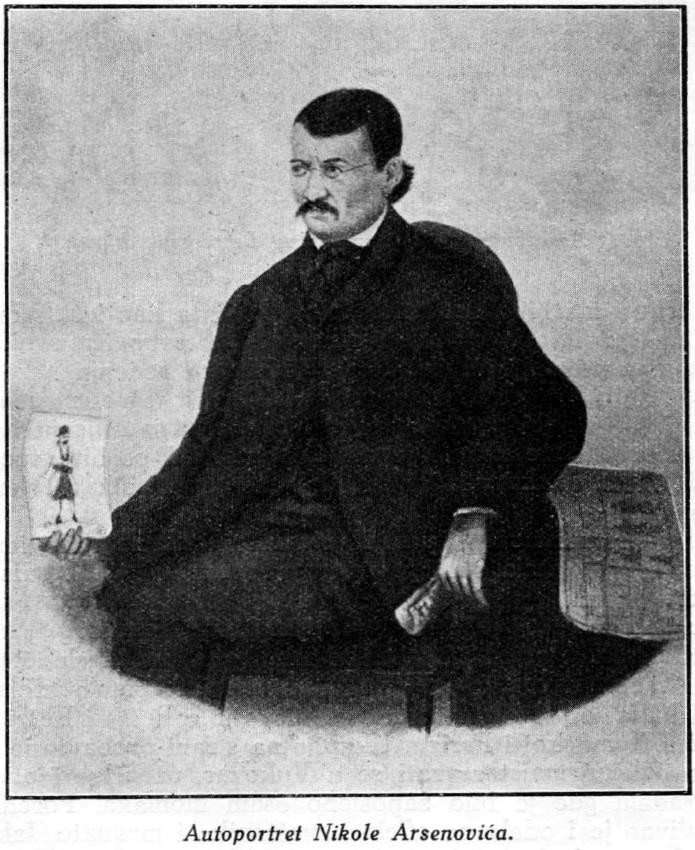
- Self-portrait
- Born: 1823; Retfala, Kingdom of Slavonia, Austrian Empire (now Croatia)
- Died: July 18, 1887 (aged 64–65); Belgrade, Kingdom of Serbia (now Serbia)
- Citizenship: Austrian, Serbian
- Occupations: tailor, illustrator
- Known for: Ethnography of Yugoslavia

Nikola Arsenović (Serbian Cyrillic: Никола Арсеновић, IPA: [nǐkola ǎrsɛːnɔʋit͡ɕ], 1823 – July 18, 1887) was an etnographer of folk costumes of Croatian Serb origin. A tailor by profession, he spent decades traveling and illustrating peasant clothing, creating the most notable 19th-century collection of national costumes from what would later become Yugoslavia. His collection is preserved in the Ethnographic Museum in Belgrade. Arsenović was also a pioneer of vocational education.

== Life ==
He was born in Retfala, near Osijek, in 1823, the area being part of the Kingdom of Slavonia of the Austrian Empire (now part of Croatia). He grew up in Srem.

He finished primary school in Osijek, and then decided to become a tailor. As a youngster, he travelled to Pest and Vienna, to perfect the craft, and also further to Paris and in Germany. He was away for 7 years, then returned, settling in Vukovar, where he married and opened a large tailor shop with eight workers. Apart from peasant clothing (or national costumes), he also tailored for military officers, clergy and citizens.

Arsenović decided to leave his family and his shop and start travelling in order to record the people's national costumes in the region. He ended up traveling for 20 years, through Slovenia, Istria, Croatia, Herzegovina, Montenegro and parts of Serbia, and recording the costumes and ornamentation in watercolor paintings and drawings, while supporting himself by painting, tailoring and sewing. His collection of works is considered the richest and most complete in the area for that time.

In 1868, he started offering his collection for review to various scientific and expert organizations, including the Geography Association in Vienna and the Royal Hungarian Craftsmen's Association in Pest in 1874.

In 1869, he appealed to both the Government of Austria-Hungary's Ministry of Trade of Industry and the Government of the Kingdom of Croatia-Slavonia with an idea to start an artistic vocational school for tailors, but was rejected. His are the first written proposals for a system of education for the tailoring profession that would include both a theoretical and a practical curriculum. His contributions to envisioning vocational education, while ignored at the time, rank him among the pioneers of vocational education in Croatia.

In 1869, the Novi Sad journal Zastave published a glowing review of Arsenović as a skilled artisan and a patriot, which was also reprinted in the Zagreb official gazette Narodne novine.

In 1875, he presented his work to artistic societies in Belgrade, and 1877 in Zagreb, where he received positive reviews from Franjo Rački and Isidor Kršnjavi. In 1879, the collection was bought by the Serbian Ministry of Education (under Stojan Bošković and Alimpije Vasiljević), but was also exhibited in Sarajevo in 1880.

His collection is preserved in the Ethnographic Museum in Belgrade.

He died in Belgrade, on July 18, 1887. He was a Yugoslavist, and called himself a Yugoslav.

== Work ==
- Nikola Arsenović (1930). Jugoslovenska narodna nošnja Југословенска народна ношња. Ethnographic Museum in Belgrade.

== Sources ==
- Gavrilović, Ljiljana (2004). Costumes from the Balkan Peninsula: the fine arts of Nikola Arsenović. Etnografski Institut SANU. ISBN 978-86-7587-030-2.
- Lukas, Mirko (2021). "Prilozi Nikole Arsenovića obrtničkom obrazovanju 19. stoljeća u Trojednoj kraljevini". Napredak: Journal of Interdisciplinary Research in Education (in Croatian). 162 (1–2). Hrvatski pedagoško-književni zbor. ISSN 1848-8641.
