= Retfala =

Coordinates: 45.563°N 18.647°E

- City district of Osijek
- Gradska četvrt Retfala; Retfala City District
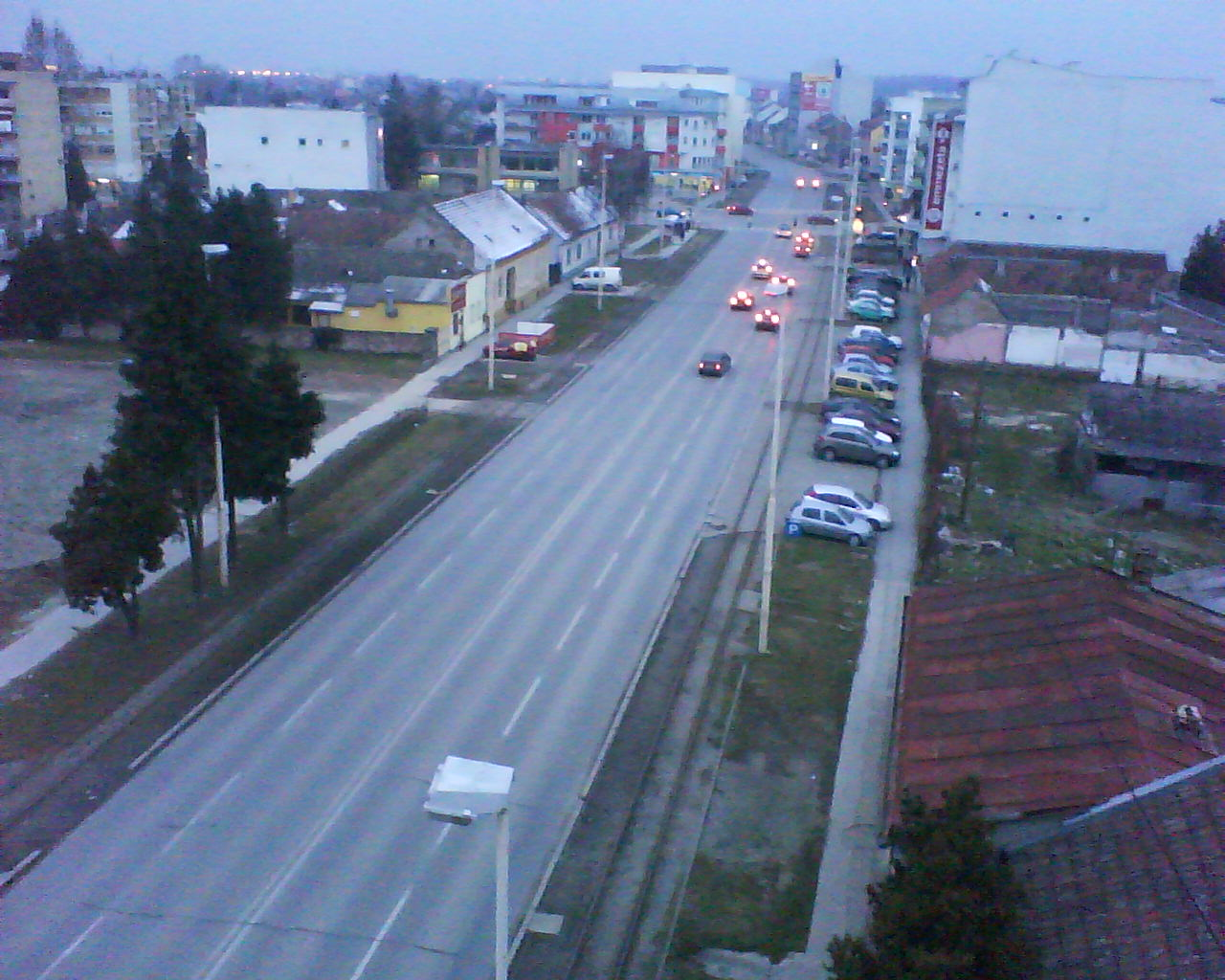
- Strossmayerova Street
- Interactive map of Retfala
- Country: Croatia
- City: Osijek
- First mention: End of 17th century
- City district: From 1947

Government
  - President of Council: Željko Lijić (HDZ)

Population (2001)
  - Total: 14,123
- Postal code: 31000 Osijek

Retfala (Hungarian: Rétfalu German: Deutsche Retfala/Rieddorf) is a city district in the western part of Osijek, Croatia. It has 14,123 inhabitants distributed in 5,200 households. It borders Gornji grad to the east, Tvrđavica to the northeast, Višnjevac to the west and Industrijska četvrt to the south.

Day of the city district is on 14 September, on Exaltation of the Holy Cross.

Its name in Hungarian and German literally means "village in meadow".

== History ==
Retfala is first mentioned in the end 17th century.

From 1750 it was estate of the family of Pejačević.

In the second half of the 18th century, Danube Swabians began to settle in Retfala.

From 19th century it was independent municipality. Colonist settlements of Adolfovac and Brešće were established on the territory of the municipality during the land reform in interwar Yugoslavia.

From 1947 it is a city district of the City of Osijek.

== Notable people ==
- Nikola Arsenović
