= Libraries in Croatia =

Libraries in Croatia, known in Croatian language as knjižnice and čitaonice ('reading rooms'), consist of a network of public libraries (narodne knjižnice) in cities, municipalities, schools and universities, as well as privately-owned libraries. National and University Library in Zagreb is the central Croatian library. Libraries have an important role in Croatian history and culture. Their work is coordinated by the Croatian Library Association (Hrvatsko knjižničarsko društvo).

== History ==
=== Up to 20th century ===
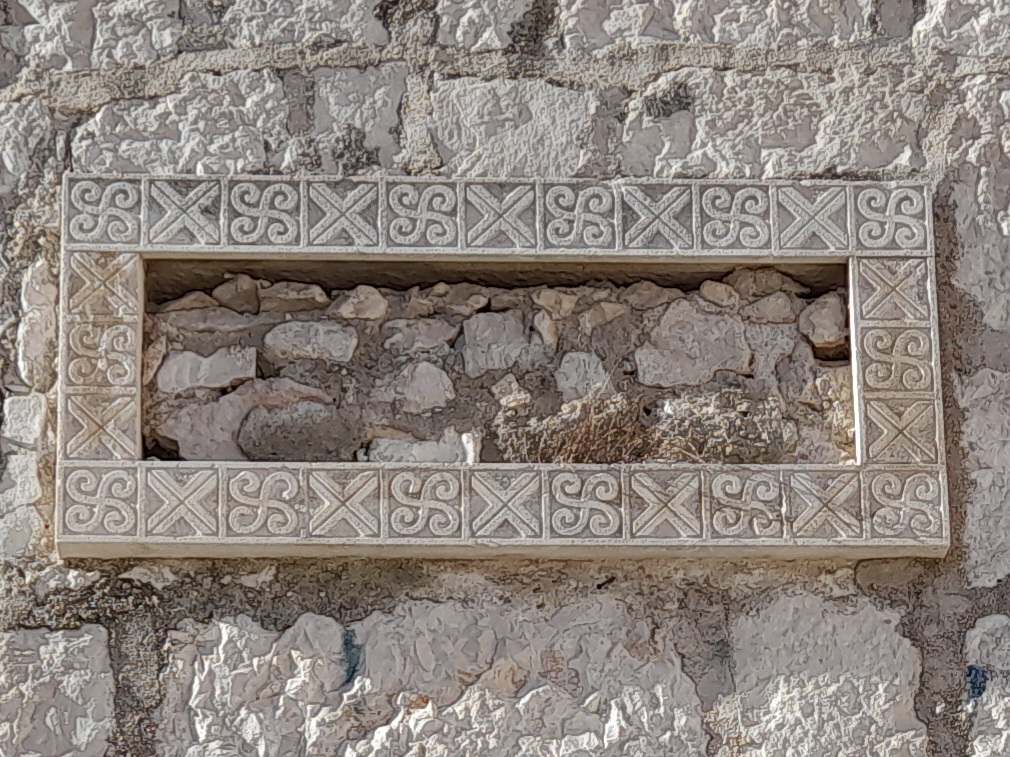
Historic Juraj Šižgorić City Library in Šibenik, 2014

Already in the Middle Ages, there were several libraries in Croatia. The oldest one was the library of the Cathedral of Saint Domnius in Split; the preserved manuscript of the Greek-Latin Evangelist of Split testifies to the existence of it (7th century). During the Renaissance and Baroque, some private libraries were established, for instance the library of Marko Marulić, a Renaissance humanist, or Bibliotheca Zriniana, the prominent book collection of Nikola VII Zrinski, Ban (Viceroy) of Croatia (1662).

Reading rooms (čitaonice), the precursor to public libraries, first appeared in Croatia in the late 1830s. Similar to other Western countries, reading rooms were places where men with common views could meet and discuss issues in solidarity. Driven by their opposition to Austro-Hungarian rule, libraries in Croatia were created with the intention of nurturing the "Croatian language and culture, as well as national awakening and identity." The founders stipulated that reading material must be written in Croatian. These rooms were often referred to as Illyrian reading rooms, named after the political and cultural Illyrian movement. The first Illyrian reading room opened in Varaždin in January 1838. Others soon opened, and by the end of the nineteenth century, more than 180 reading rooms were operating in Croatia.

Reading rooms started functioning as libraries rather than just a place to discuss political activities. Libraries that are publicly funded began to appear in Croatia during the 20th century. However, World War I slowed down the progress of libraries. The lack of progress can be attributed to Croatia joining the Kingdom of Yugoslavia, where individual and national rights were restricted. After WWII, Croatia became one of the six republics of the Socialist Federal Republic of Yugoslavia. Citing post war enthusiasm, author Dijana Sabolović-Krajina writes that libraries open in great numbers. The Librarianship Act of 1960 is passed. Librarianship and libraries in Croatia strengthen thanks to a "set legal and professional framework for all types of libraries."

During the Croatian War of Independence, many libraries experienced disruption to patron services due to the conflict. More than 200 libraries, as well as museums and archives sustained some sort of damage or were destroyed, including valuable and irreplaceable historical collections. Rebuilding libraries postwar became a “top priority at the close of the twentieth century.” Unlike other Eastern Bloc countries, Croatians could travel to the West (mostly for labour as gastarbeiters). As a result of this contact, Western libraries "influenced the character and progress of Croatian libraries and librarianship before and after the 1990s."

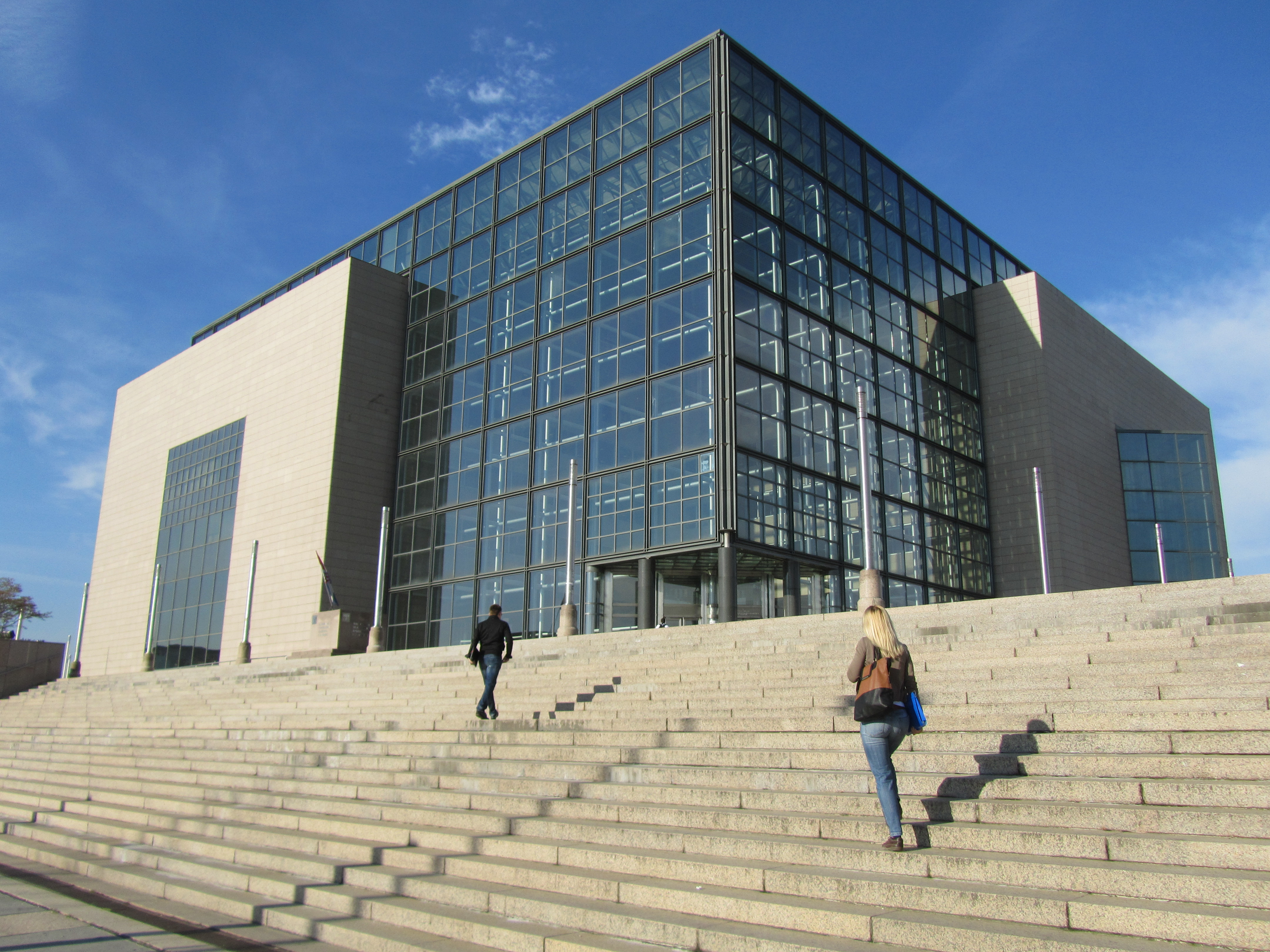
National and University Library in Zagreb, 2013

After the war ended and the country gained independence, Croatia transformed from a socialist republic to a political and economic democracy. In 1997, the government passed the Library Act, a law decrees that a public library should be established in communities with more than 5000 residents. However, not all communities are able to comply with this law due to limited finances or resources. It is estimated that there were a total of 1,731 as of 2010. This includes libraries that fall into public, national, university or higher education, church, general education, and special library categories. Academic, special, and research libraries are governed by the Ministry of Science, Education, and Sports, while the Ministry of Culture is responsible for public libraries. Both are governed by the Croatian Library Council.

=== 21st century ===
In 2016, Croatian public librarians collaborated with EIFL to help develop a vision on what libraries could do to improve the country. They arrived at four goals: provide advanced digital skills that help young people become employable in technical fields, help foster interest in creative industries, improve access to those living in rural areas, and promote social inclusion.

As with other libraries world-wide, the country's libraries closed or scaled back services during the COVID-19 pandemic. The Croatian Library Council urged libraries to work and, as far as possible, remain "accessible to users as important support to the community"

== List of libraries by type ==
See also: List of libraries in Croatia (in Croatian)

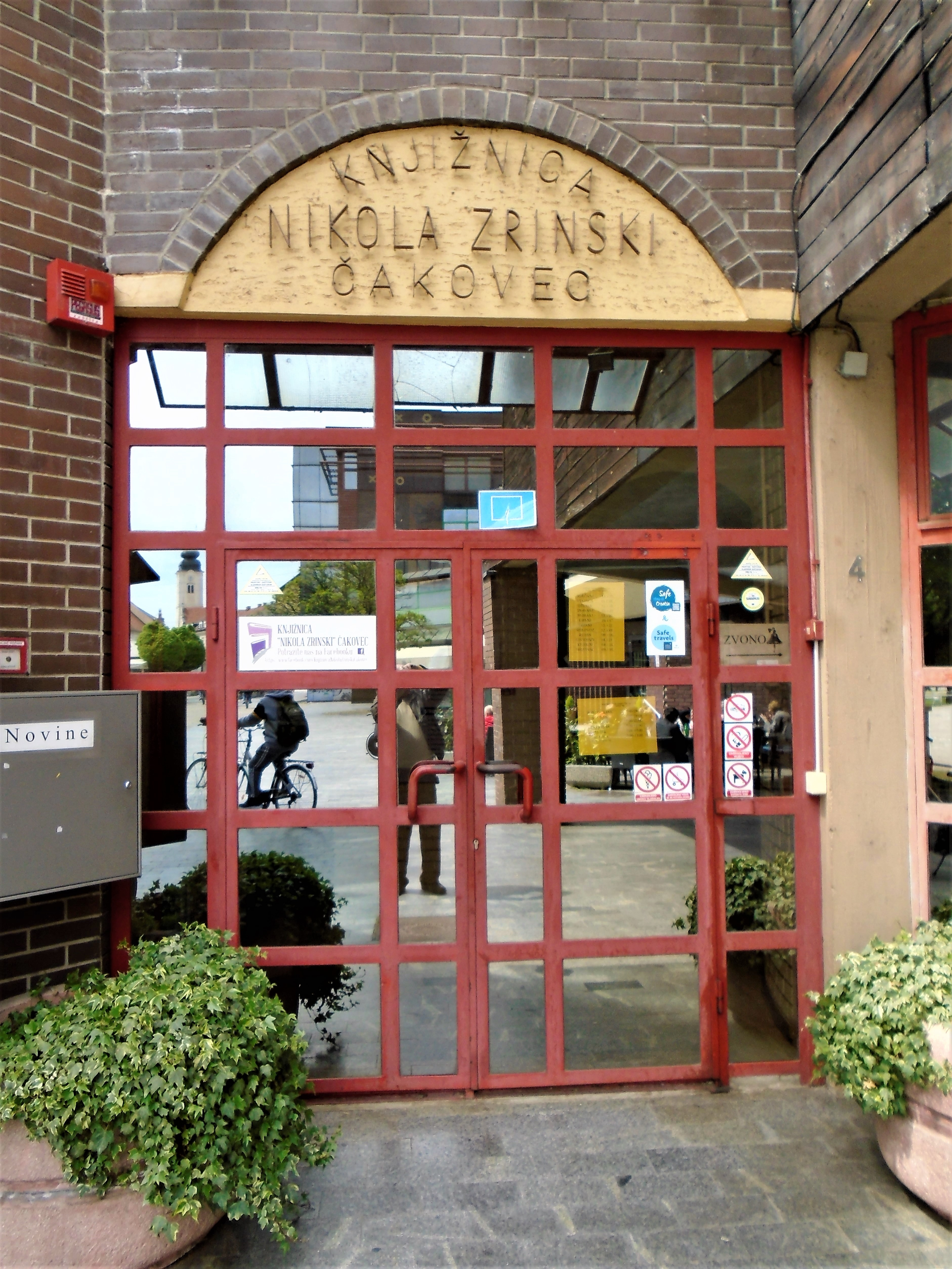
Nikola Zrinski Library in Čakovec, 2023

=== Public libraries ===
- August Cesarac Library, Zagreb, Šubićeva street
- Biograd City Library
- Croatian Library for the Blind
- Nikola Zrinski Library, Čakovec
- Hvar Public Library
- Ivan Goran Kovačić City Library
- Ivan Vidali Library, Korčula
- Juraj Šižgorić Šibenik City Library
- Fran Galović Koprivnica Public Library
- Krapina City Library
- Marko Marulić City Library, Split
- Matija Vlačić Ilirik Public Library
- Medveščak Library, Zagreb
- Orebić Library
- Petar Preradović Bjelovar National Library
- Poreč City Library
- Pula City Library
- Rijeka City Library
- Sloboština Library
- Town Library and Reading Room
- Trsat National Reading Room
- Villa Ružić
- Vinkovci City Library
- Vukovar City Library
- Zadar City Library
- Research Library of Zadar
- Zagreb City Libraries }

=== College and university libraries ===
- City and University Library in Osijek
- Library of Croatian Academy of Arts and Sciences
- Library of the Faculty of Humanities and Social Sciences
- National and University Library in Zagreb
- University Library Rijeka
- University of Split Library
- University of Zagreb, Faculty of Law Library

=== Other libraries ===
- Library of the Eparchy of Slavonia
- Research Library Dubrovnik (Croatian: Znanstvena knjižnica Dubrovnik)
- Central Library of Serbs of Croatia

== See also ==
- Access to public information in Croatia
- List of archives in Croatia
- Mass media in Croatia
