= Access to public information in Croatia =

Access to public information and freedom of information (FOI) refer to the right of access to information held by public bodies also known as "right to know". Access to public information is considered of fundamental importance for the effective functioning of democratic systems, as it enhances governments' and public officials' accountability, boosting people participation and allowing their informed participation into public life. The fundamental premise of the right of access to public information is that the information held by governmental institutions is in principle public and may be concealed only on the basis of legitimate reasons which should be detailed in the law.

In the course of EU accession negotiations Croatia harmonised its media legislation to European standards. This process touched also legislation on access to public information which has been amended to reflect European and international standards.

Croatia thus adopted its law on the Right of Access to Public Information in 2013, after a decade of advocacy, campaigns, and public discussions led by civil society organisations. However, despite the improvements of the legal framework regulating access to public information, problems remain in the implementation, especially for journalists willing to request and obtain information from the government.

== Legal framework ==
In Croatia, access to public information has become a constitutional right with the 2010 amendments of the Constitution. It is regulated by the Law on the Right to Access Information adopted by the Croatian Parliament in 2013. The Law also regulates the re-use of information held by public authorities. The Law complies with the Directive 2003/98/EC of the European Parliament and of the Council on the re-use of public sector information and with Regulation 1049/2001 of the European Parliament and of the Council of 30 May 2001 regarding public access to European Parliament, Council and Commission documents.

According to the Law, the right of access to information encompasses the right of the beneficiaries, i.e. any local or foreign natural person or legal entity, to seek and acquire information, as well as the obligation of public authorities to guarantee access to requested information, regardless of the request.

The Croatian law on Access to public information is in informed by four principles:

- the principle of publicity and free access, meaning that information are available to any national or foreign natural persons or legal entity as established by the Law;
- the principle of timeliness, entirety and accuracy of information, meaning that information disclosed under the Law must be timely provided, complete and accurate;
- the principle of equality, meaning that the right of access to information is granted to every beneficiary in an equal manner;
- the principle of disposal of information, meaning that beneficiaries that obtained the information in accordance with the Law, are entitled to disclose this information in public.

Public bodies are obliged to publish on the Internet the following relevant information: laws and other regulations in their field of activity, including draft proposals of laws; general acts and decisions affecting the interests of beneficiaries; annual plans, programmes, strategies and financial reports referring to the work of public authority bodies; information on budget, financing sources and subsidies; information on their internal organisation; notes and conclusions from official sessions; information on public procurement and tenders; information on the way of exercising rights of access to and re-use of information, including contact details of the Information Commissioner and the fee required to access and re-use of information.

For the purpose of ensuring the right of access to information, the Law establishes that public bodies are obliged to appoint an Information Commissioner, a special official in charge of resolving the issues emerging from the exercise of the right of access to information. Specifically, the Information Commissioner shall conduct the tasks connected to disclosure of public information in accordance with the Law, including providing the necessary assistance to applicants, improving the manner of processing, classification and safe-keeping of the information, and maintaining the Information Commissioner Register.

=== Restrictions to the right of access to information ===
Public authority bodies may restrict access to information if:

- the information has been classified, in accordance with the law regulating classified information;
- if the information represents a trade or professional secret;
- in the information is a tax-related secret;
- is the information is protected by the law regulating the protection of personal information;
- the information may seriously undermine an ongoing decision-making process;
- the information is restricted in accordance with international treaties.

Moreover, restrictions may be operated when there can be reasonable doubts that disclosing the requested information might prevent the efficiency, independence or impartiality of ongoing proceedings or the execution of court orders and sentence.

=== Proportionality Test and Public Interest Test ===
The public authority body in charge of acting upon the request of access to information is obliged to conduct the Proportionality Interest Test in order to reach the decision about disclosure. Proportionality Test and Public Interest Test refer to the assessment of proportionality between reasons for granting access to information and reasons for imposing restrictions and granting access to information only when the public interest prevails. If, on the basis of the Test, the public interest prevails over the damage caused to other protected interests, the information shall be disclosed.

=== Procedures ===
Public authorities are bound to grant access to information by timely publishing the information on their work in an accessible manner, i.e. on the webpage, or in the Official Gazette and the Central catalogue of officials documents of the Republic of Croatia, etc. Information can be provided directly, or in writing, or by giving insight into documents and making copies of the documents containing the requested information, or by delivering copies of the requested information.

Applicants can submit the request either orally or in written form. The submitter of the request is not obliged to mention any reason for requesting access to information.

Access to public information does not require paying any administrative and court fees. The beneficiaries might only be called to pay for the actual costs of providing the information requested.

Authorities are obliged to issue their decisions within 15 days from the day of submitting a request. This deadline can be prolonged by other 15 days in case of complex requests (e.g. when the information must be sought outside the offices of the public authority concerned, when a single request contains a request for different information, or when the situation requires to conduct the Proportionality Test and Public Interest Test, etc.)

If the public authority does not hold the information, it is obliged to transfer the request to the body that might have it and notify the submitter thereof.

=== Right to appeal ===
Against the Decision taken by the public authority, the applicant may file a Complaint to the Commissioner within 15 days since the Decision has been delivered.

No complaint may be filed against the decision issued by the Commission, but an administrative dispute may be initiated before the High Administrative Court of the Republic of Croatia.

=== Re-use of information ===
The Croatian law on access to public information regulates also the right to re-use information for commercial or non-commercial purposes.

== Access to public information in practice ==
The Croatian law on access to public information is quite advanced and in line with international standards and best practices. However, in the country a culture of secrecy persists. and the law, by itself, has not changed this and so far it has not raised the level of general transparency in Croatian society and institutions.

One of the main problem affecting the realization of the right of access to public information is the lack of adequate resources allocated to the office of the Commissioner. According to the 2015 Report on the implementation of the law presented to the Parliament, an increase in the resources for the functioning of the Commissioner’s Office if compared with previous years, they are still too limited to allow for the full application of the law. Over the course of 2015, the number of cases dealt with by the Commissioner’s Office has increased. However, the report showed that, due to a lack of staff and resources, not all the complaints received during 2015 have been solved by the Commissioner’s Office.

Another problem concerns the limited application of proactive disclosure, which - according to the Commissioner Anamarija Musa - together with re-use of information, a milestone of access to public information in the 21st century. Also, according to Commissioner Musa, the implementation of the law is particularly problematic at regional and local level and when it comes to requesting information to private entities providing a public service or to enterprises where the state holds the majority of capital shares. Moreover, Commissioner Musa deems particularly concerning the fact that access to public information requests are regularly ignored, so that the two thirds of the overall complaints received by the Commissioner are caused by this reason.

=== Imamo pravo znati (“We have right to know”) platform ===
In Croatia, the web platform imamopravoznati.org, developed using the Alavetely software, has been launched to facilitate citizens' exercise of the right of access to public information. It allows to submit requests for public information to Croatian public authorities, and track their answers. Historic requests, any correspondence between the applicant and public authorities, are archived and publicly online.

== See also ==
- Access to public information in Europe
- Freedom of information
- Freedom of information laws by country
- Libraries in Croatia
- Transparency of media ownership in Europe
- Media of Croatia
- Transparency of media ownership in Croatia
