= Ethnographic Museum, Belgrade =

Museum in Belgrade, Serbia

Ethnographic Museum
- Етнографски музеј
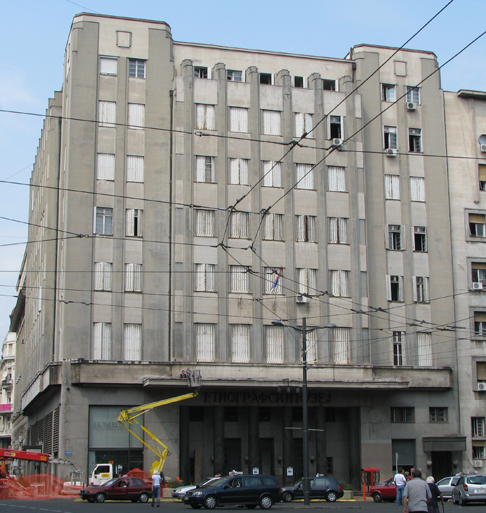
- View from outside
- Established: 1901; 125 years ago
- Location: Studentski trg 13, Belgrade, Serbia
- Coordinates: 44.8198°N 20.4563°E
- Type: Ethnographic Museum
- Director: Marko Krstić
- Website: www.etnografskimuzej.rs

The Ethnographic Museum (Serbian Cyrillic: Етнографски музеј) is a museum located in Belgrade, the capital of Serbia. It is one of the oldest museums in the Balkans. The Ethnographic Museum in Belgrade fulfills its mission together with the efforts of various stakeholders in the domain of presentation, revitalization and development of crafts in Serbia.

== History ==
The Ethnographic Museum in Belgrade was founded in 1901, when the Ethnographic Department was separated from the National Museum of Serbia. The inauguration of the first permanent exhibition of the museum was organized on 20 September 1904, during the centennial of the First Serbian Uprising. During the first years of its work, the activities of the Ethnographic Museum were focused on the purchase of museum items and the presentation of the Kingdom of Serbia abroad.

In World War I, a large number of museum items were destroyed, as well as the documentation and the library. The museum library was re-established in 1920. Today, its holdings contain about 60,000 publications: 33,000 books and about 27,000 journals dealing with ethnology, anthropology and related scholarly disciplines.

During World War II, museum objects were packed and removed from the building in which the museum was housed at that time. The Nazi occupiers looted the jewelry collection, the collection of metalwork, and other valuable items from the Ethnographic Museum in Belgrade.

After the war, the museum was moved into the building of the Belgrade Stock Exchange at No. 13 Studentski Trg (Square).

The museum collections currently contain about 200,000 items, 56,000 of which are ethnographic objects.

== Building of the Museum ==
After repeatedly changing location – from the home of Stevče Mihajlović which is located at the corner of Kneza Miloša and Birčaninova Street and the building at the corner of Njegoševa and Knjeginje Zorke Street (1938) to the adapted building of the guards of the court complex on Terazije (1945-1948) – the Museum in 1951 moved into the building on the corner of 13, Studentski trg and 2, Uzun Mirkova, which was built during 1933 and 1934, and it was designed by architect Aleksandar Đorđević. It was built for the needs of the former BSE, as a building for business and residential purposes. According to its architectural features, the building belongs to mature modernist concept, while the accented verticalism carries foreign, mostly German influences. Erected as a five-story building in a prominent position within the surroundings of the Academic park in the immediate vicinity of higher education buildings (building of Advanced School – today the Rectorate of the Belgrade University, building of the New University – today the Faculty of Philology), cultural institutions (building of Kolarac National University) and city administration buildings (the building of the Belgrade municipality – today the Yugoslav Cinematheque, city police) immediately after the construction, it was recognized as a piece of extraordinary value, and it is valorized today as an important part of the art deco architecture in Serbia. It had its original purpose of the stock market until the beginning of the Second World War and after the end of the war, one part of the building changed its purpose. At the beginning of the 1950s, a part of the basement, the ground floor, the mezzanine, the first and the second floor were ceded to the Ethnographic Museum. In the period from 1951 to 1954, renovation work of this part of the building was carried out for the purpose of placing museum collections and funds and organizing exhibition activities, and with the forthcoming adaptation conducted during 1983–1984, the building was tailored to the museum almost completely, on all five floors. Adaptations of the building are primarily related to customizing the interior to the new function, while the authenticity of its facade and monumental entrance area was preserved. As a work of urban-architectural, cultural and historical values within which there is a cultural institution which cherishes a rich ethnographic heritage, the Ethnographic Museum was established in 1984 as a cultural monument.

== The museum today ==
The Ethnographic Museum now contains eight permanent exhibitions and about 300 temporary ones. The permanent exhibition occupies three levels of the building. Today, the Ethnographic Museum houses a large number of ethnographic objects, distributed in private collections (furniture, jewelry, traditions, costumes, folk architecture, industry, animal husbandry, transport, cult objects, etc.), has one of the richest specialized libraries in the Balkans and publishes professional publications, has a great conservation service that handles virtually all types of materials, has a large exhibition space, organizes extensive ethnographic research and has a lot of will and knowledge to carry out an ethnological and anthropological study of the 19th century.

The Center for the Intangible Cultural Heritage of Serbia was inaugurated at the Ethnographic Museum in Belgrade in 2012. On 7 June 2013, in the Ethnographical Museum, a list of intangible cultural heritage of Serbia was presented, which consisted of 27 elements. In the next 10 years, as of June 2023, the list was expanded to include 57 elements.

== Gallery ==
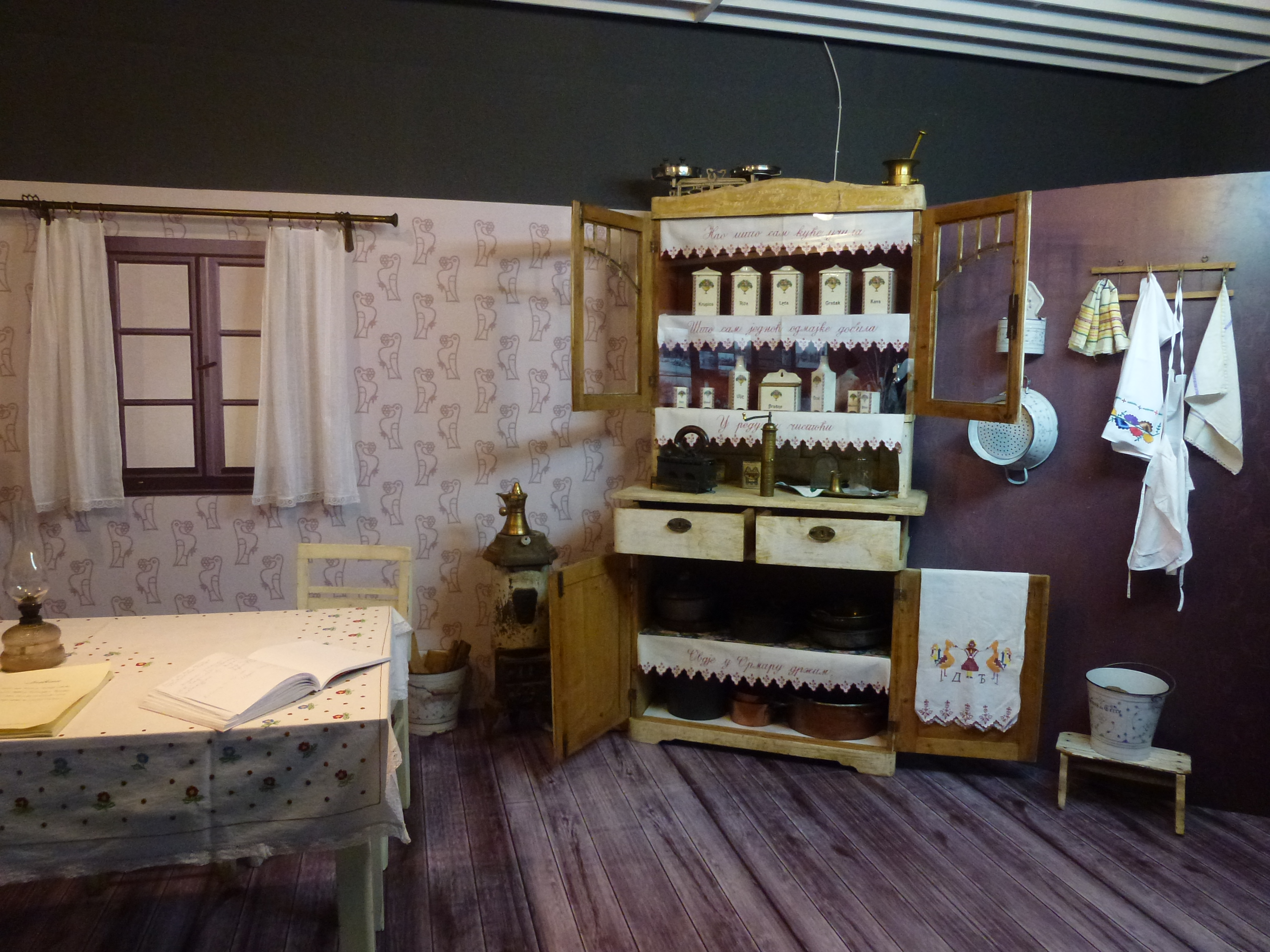

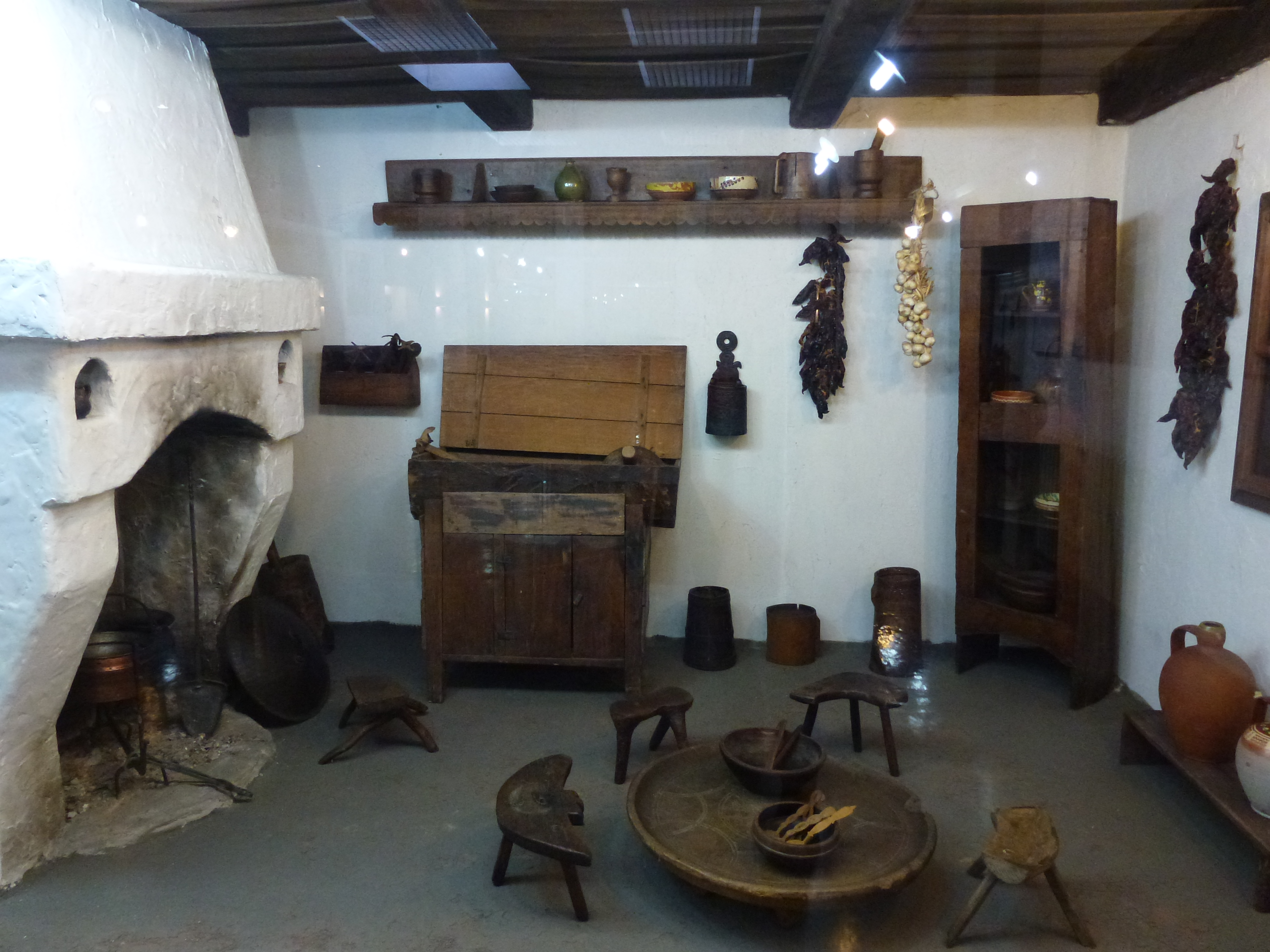

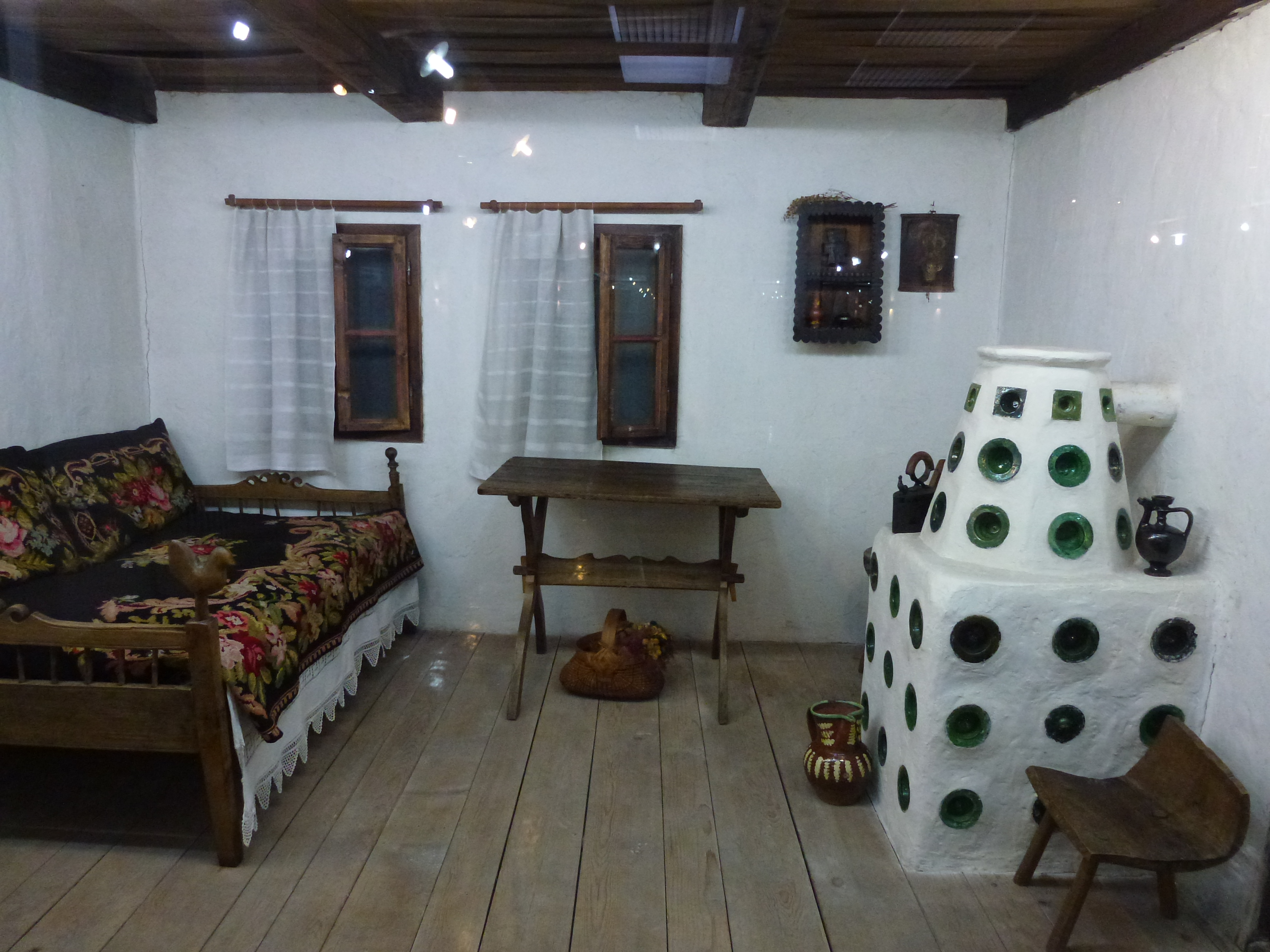

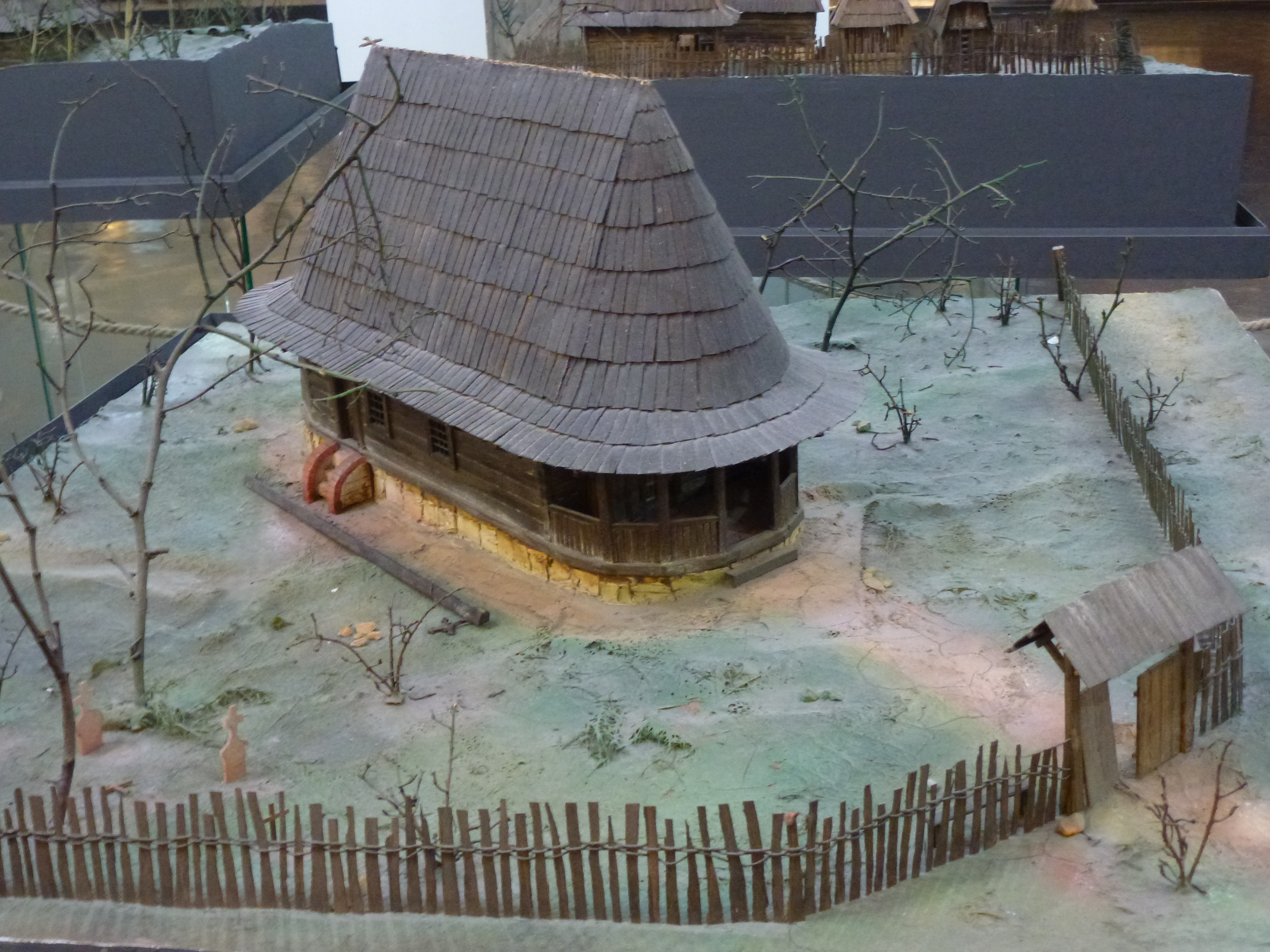

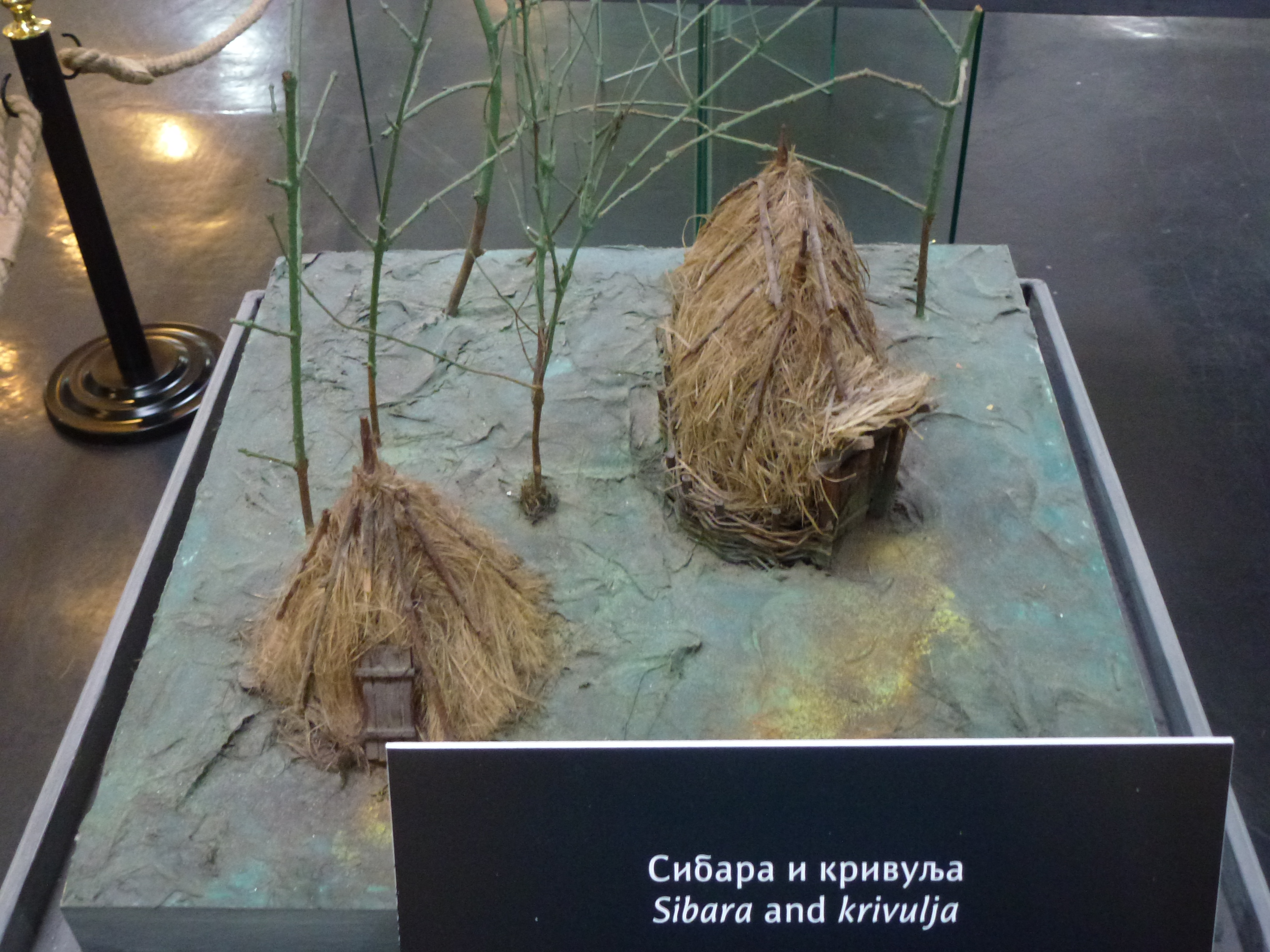

== See also ==
- List of museums in Serbia

== Sources ==
- 1. Jump up↑ Завод за заштиту споменика културе града Београда, досије споменика културе Етнографски музеј; З.М., „Етнографски музеј у Београду“, ГМГБ 1, 1954, 316–321.
- 2. Jump up↑ Завод за заштиту споменика културе града Београда, часопис Наслеђе, Милан Просен, Градитељски опус архитекте Александра Ђорђевића (1890-1952) http://beogradskonasledje.rs/wp-content/uploads/2012/09/7/9_milan_prosen.pdf accessed 30.01.2017.
- 3. Jump up↑ Belgrade City Institute for the Protection of Cultural Monuments /Ethnographic Museum
- 4. Jump up↑ http://beogradskonasledje.rs/kd/zavod/stari_grad/kapetan_misino_zdanje.html accessed 30.01.2017.
- 5. Jump up↑ http://beogradskonasledje.rs/kd/zavod/stari_grad/zgrada_kolarcevog_narodnog_univerziteta.html accessed 30.01.2017.
- 6. Jump up↑ http://beogradskonasledje.rs/kd/zavod/stari_grad/zgrada_beogradske_opstine.html accessed 30.01.2017.
- 7. Jump up↑ Милан Просен, Ар деко у Србији, рукопис докторске дисертације одбрањене на Одељењу за историју уметности Филозофског факултета Универзитета у Београду 2014. године, 335–336.
- 8. Jump up↑ Serbian intangible heritage includes... (B92, 7 June 2013)
