= Industrijska četvrt =

Coordinates: 45.550°N 18.683°E

- City district of Osijek
- Gradska četvrt Industrijska četvrt Industrijska Četvrt City District
- Interactive map of Industrijska četvrt
- Country: Croatia
- City: Osijek

Government
  - President of Council: Miroslav Juričić (HDZ)

Population (2001)
  - Total: 6,920

Industrijska četvrt is a city district of Osijek, Croatia. It has 6,920 inhabitants distributed in 2,000 households.

Day of the city district is on 1 May, on feast of Saint Joseph the Worker.

Its name in Croatian literally means "Industrial district".
