= Zagreb TV Tower =

OIV Tower Sljeme
- OIV toranj Sljeme
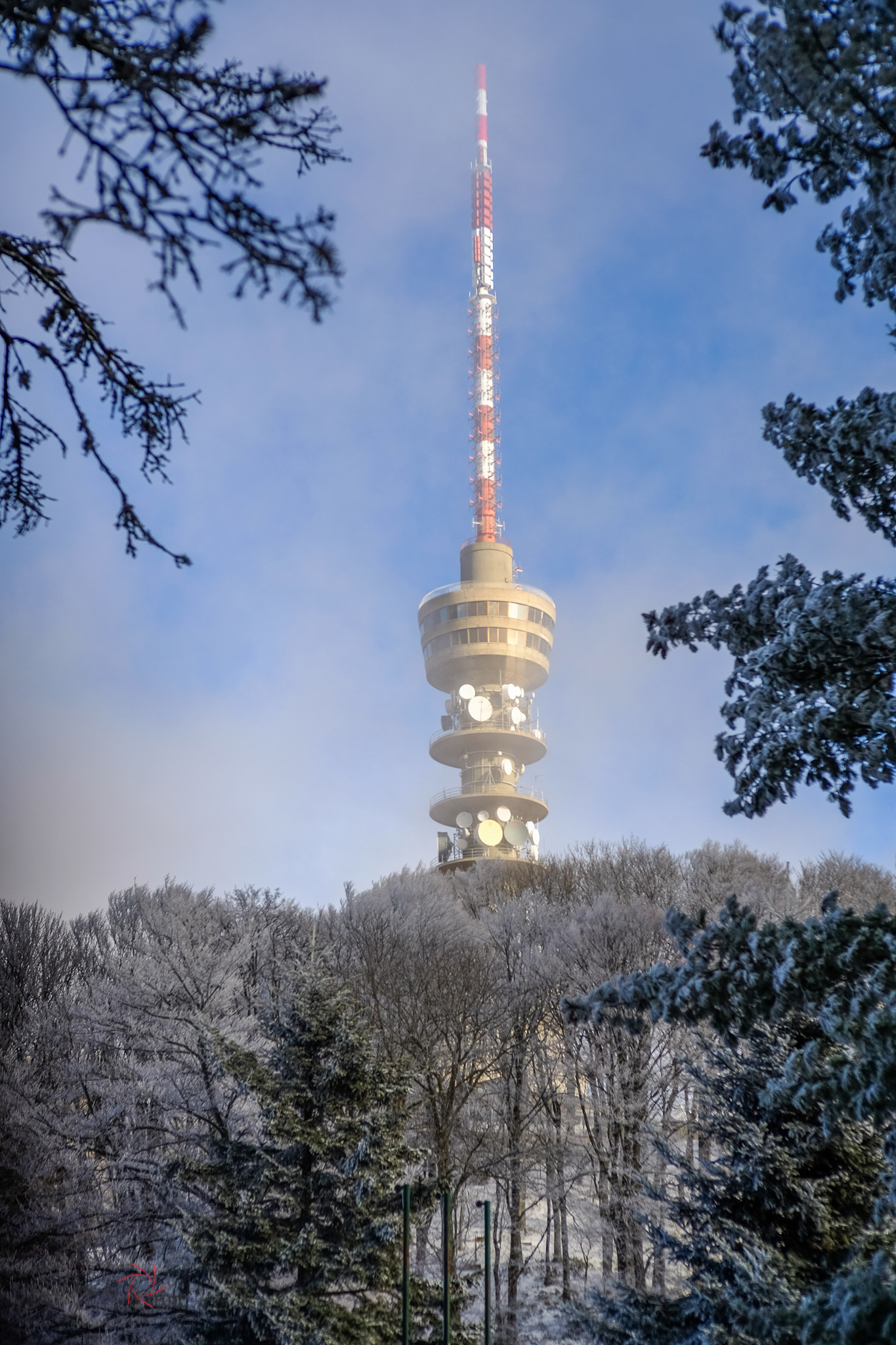
- Tower in 2017
- Interactive map of the OIV Tower Sljeme area

General information
- Type: Communications tower Observation tower
- Location: Sljeme summit, Medvednica, Croatia
- Coordinates: 45°53′58″N 15°56′53″E
- Completed: 1976
- Owner: Odašiljači i veze

Height
- Antenna spire: 169 meters (554 ft)
- Roof: 82 meters (269 ft)

Design and construction
- Structural engineer: Krešimir Šavor
- Main contractor: GP Tehnika; Mostogradnja

OIV Tower Sljeme is a 169-metre (563 ft) tall TV and radio tower built of reinforced concrete on the summit of the 1035 metre (3450 ft) tall peak Sljeme of the Medvednica mountain north of Zagreb, Croatia.

== History ==
First observation towers on Sljeme were built in 19th century. In 1869, the first wooden construction was built, which also served as a trigonometric point. In 1889, the same year Eifell Tower was built, a 12 meters tall iron observation tower was built on Sljeme. As radio technology progressed, the observation tower become increasingly used as a radio transmitter. In 1960 the first 82 meters tall iron tower was built on Sljeme, which was by 1965 open for visitors, while 12 meters tall tower from 1889 was relocated to Japetić, the highest peak of nearby Samoborsko Gorje. However, even this 82 meters tall tower was soon demolished in order to build the current modern tower.

Zagreb TV Tower was built in 1973. It is open to the public, with a cafe and observation deck at 82-metre (269 ft) level. The tower itself is 169 m tall.

On 4 October 1991, during the Croatian War of Independence, the tower was a target of a Yugoslav Air Force attack. The tower was bombed at 16:10 and as a consequence the entire fourth and fifth floors and a portion of the third floor sustained heavy damage, rendering the tower unusable. Two staff members present at the time of the attack were not hurt as they took shelter at the base of the tower. It took three months to repair the damage. During that time the television programme was broadcast via several low-power transmitters located within Zagreb itself and on top of the Medvednica Mountain. The alternate transmitters were already in position at the time because an attack against the tower was considered possible.

There are some speculations about the opening of the tower restaurant, as a part of the "Sljeme" project, which includes building of the new ski-tracks, and an extension of the cable car line.

== FM ==
Frequency (MHz)	Broadcaster	RDS PS	RDS PI	ERP (kW)	Antenna diagram round (ND) / pointed (D)	Polarization horizontal (H) / vertical (V)
88,1	Hrvatski radio - Radio Sljeme	HRT-SLJE	C31C	5	D (50°-90°); D (130°-140°); D (180°-200°); D (240°-250°); D (290°-310°)	H/V
89,7	Antena Zagreb	_ANTENA_	C30D	4,7		H/V
92,1	Hrvatski radio - 1. program	HRT-HR_1	C201	120	ND	H/V
98,5	Hrvatski radio - 2. program	HRT-HR_2	C202	120	ND	H/V
101,0	Radio 101	RADIO101	C30E	120	D (40°-330°)	H/V
103,5	Hrvatski katolički radio	_+_HKR_+	C204	120	ND	H/V

== DAB+ ==
Experimental test transmission until November 2018.

Channel	Frequency (MHz)	Multiplex	Programs	RDS PS	ERP (kW)	Radiation pattern non-directional/omnidirectinal (ND) directional (D)	Polarization horizontal (H) vertical (V)
9C	206,352	OIV Croatia DAB+	Otvoreni radio; Yammat FM; Laganini DAB+; Antena Zagreb; Domaći radio NG; Narodni radio; Radio Dalmacija; HRT HR1; HRT HR2; HRT HR3; Radio Trogir; Antena Zadar	Otvoreni; YammatFM; Laganini; Antena; Doma?iN; narodni; RadDalma; HR1; HR2; HR3; Trogir; AntenaZd	5	ND	H

DAB broadcast from this transmitter has been received several times in south-west Slovakia, 300 km away.

== Digital television (DVB-T2) ==
Channel	Frequency (MHz)	Multiplex	Programmes	ERP (kW)	Antenna diagram non-directional (ND) / directional (D)	Polarization horizontal (H) vertical (V)	Modulation	FEC	Guard interval	Bitrate (MBit/s)
25	506	MUX M1	HTV1 HD; HTV2 HD; RTL HD; NOVA TV HD; HRT3 HD; HRT4 HD; RTL 2 HD; Doma TV HD	100	D (100°-360°) (suppression 10°-90°/7 dB)	H	64-QAM (32K OFDM)	2/3	19/256	27,30
28	530	EVOtv	EVOtv info; EVOtv portal; Al Jazeera Balkans; CNN; National Geographic; NatGeo Wild; Viasat Explore; Viasat History; Epic Drama; Doku TV HD; Viasat Nature HD; HBO HD; HBO2 HD; HBO3 HD; Cinemax; Cinemax 2; Klasik TV; TV1000; AXN; Movie Generation; RTL Living; Kino TV; Cinestar TV; FOX; FOX Life; M1 FILM; M1 GOLD; Test	50	ND	H	256-QAM (32K OFDM)	2/3	19/256	36,52
40	626	MUX M2	Sportska televizija HD; RTL KOCKICA HD; CMC HD; JABUKA TV HD; MrezaZG HD; Z1 HD	100	D (100°-360°) (suppression 10°-90°/7 dB)	H	256-QAM (32K OFDM)	2/3	19/256	36,52
48	690	EVOtv	Da Vinci; Laudato TV; CineStar TV Premiere 1 HD; CineStar TV Premiere 2 HD; CineStar TV Action and Thriller; CineStar TV Fantasy; Fox Crime; Fox Movies; Toon kids; Baby TV; Boomerang; Cartoon Network; Nickelodeon; Nick Jr. Channel; Arenasport 1; Arenasport 2; Arenasport 3; Arenasport 4; Arenasport 5; Arenasport 6; HNTV; 24Kitchen; MTV; VH1; DM Sat; Jugoton; RTL Crime; RTL Adria; RTL Passion; Vivid	50	ND	H	256-QAM (32K OFDM)	2/3	19/256	36,52

== Gallery ==
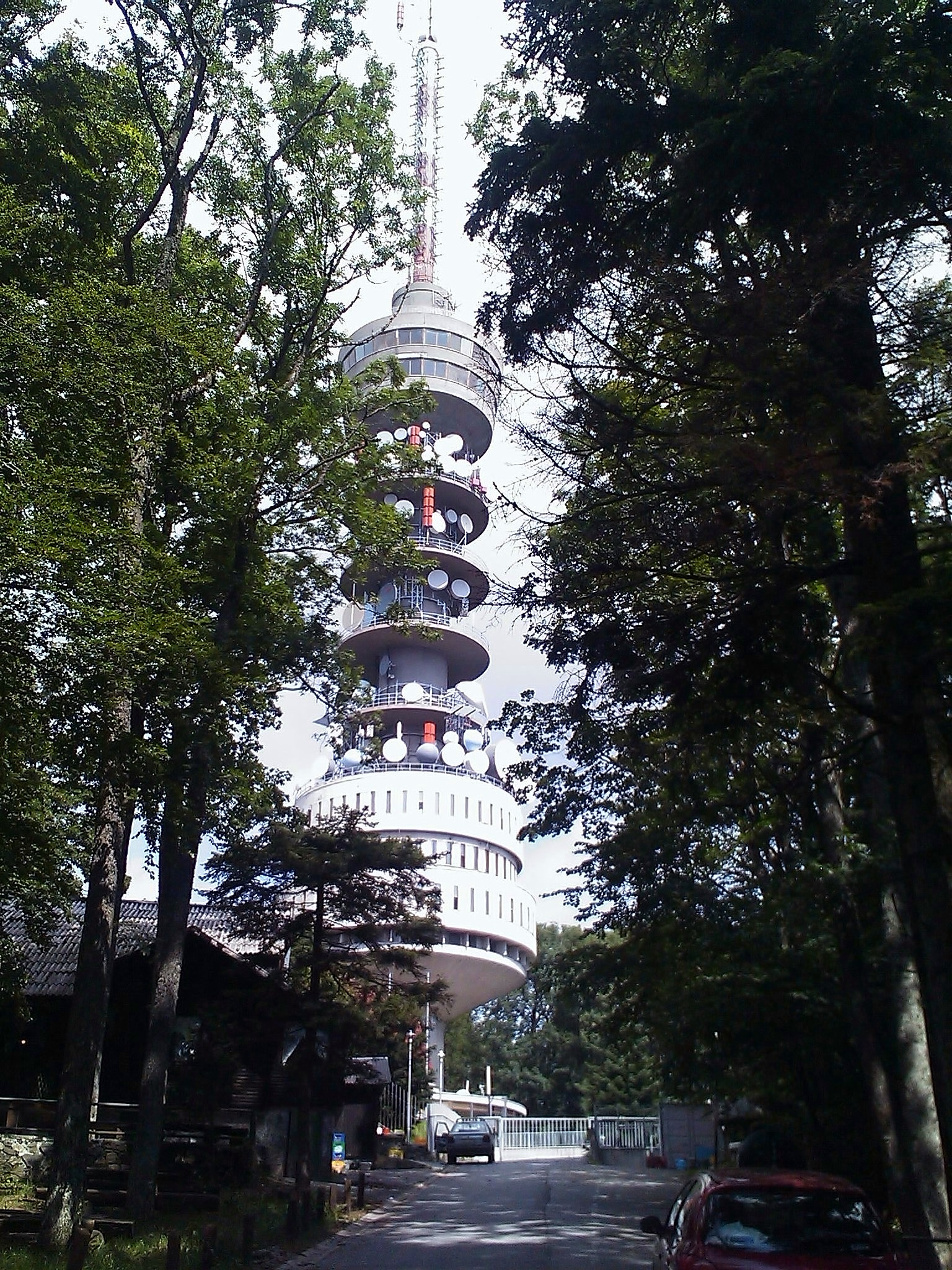
Tower in 2010

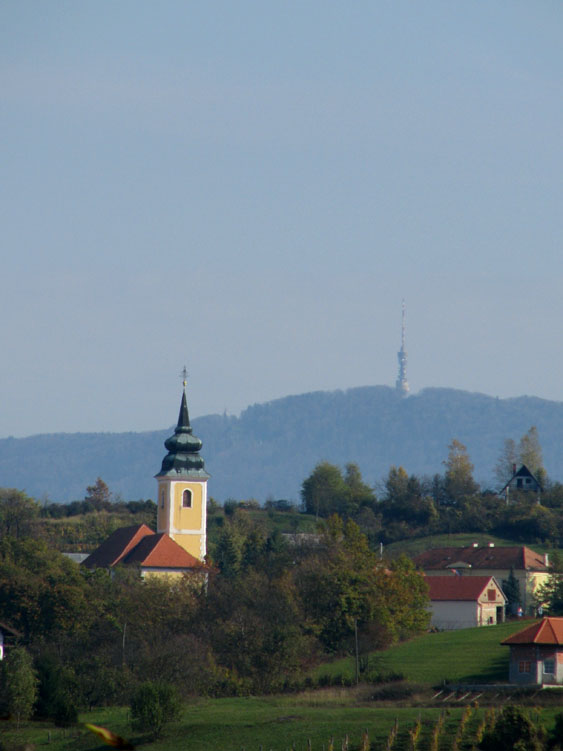
Tower seen from Marija Bistrica

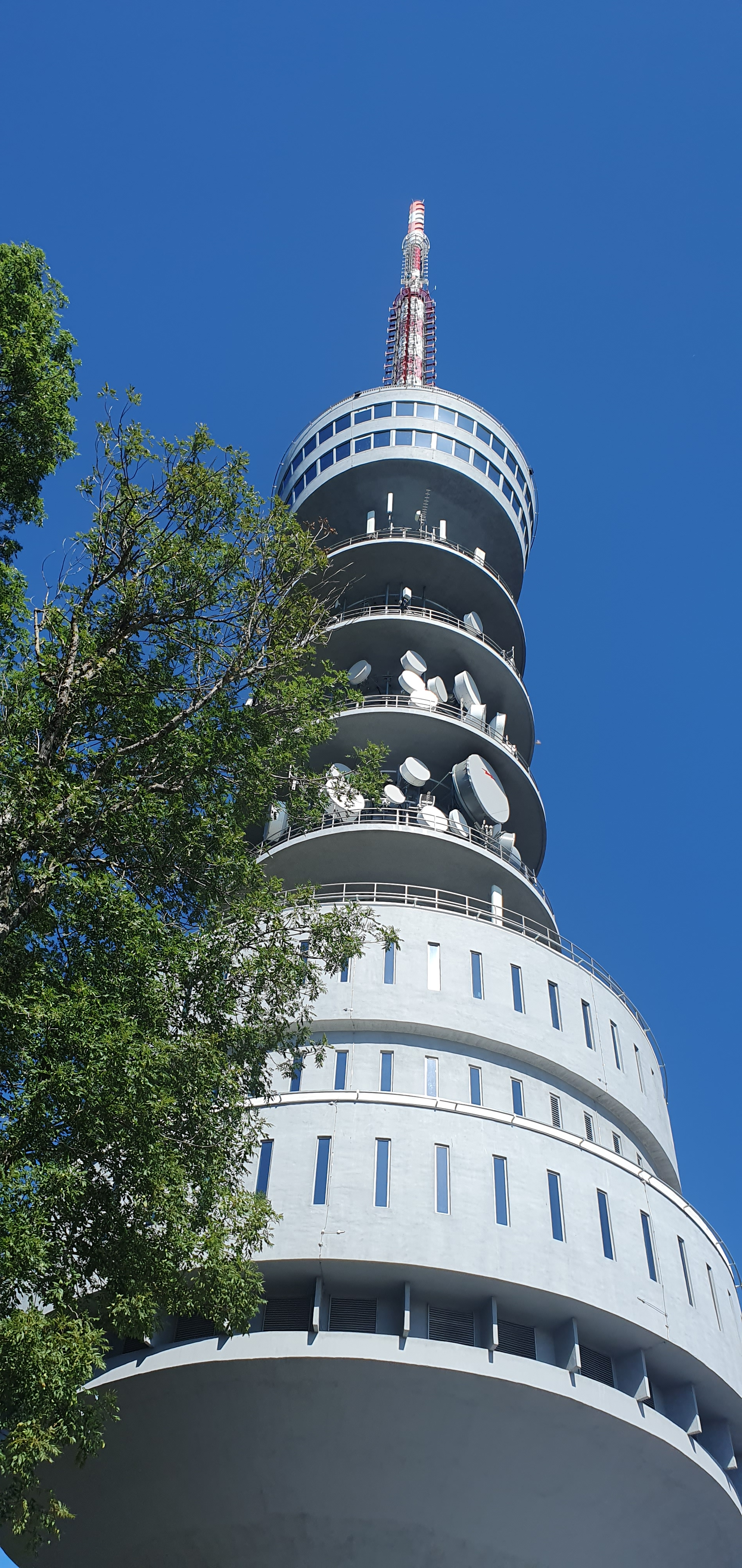
Tower in 2024

== See also ==
- List of tallest buildings in Croatia
- Medvednica
