= Slika Hrvatske =

- Country: Croatia
- Broadcast area: Croatia
- Network: Hrvatska radiotelevizija
- Headquarters: Zagreb

Programming
- Language: Croatian
- Picture format: 576i (16:9) (SDTV)

Ownership
- Owner: Croatian Government
- Sister channels: HRT 1; HRT 2; HRT 3; HRT 4

History
- Closed: 17 March 2016
- Former names: Radiotelevision Zagreb (RTZ), part of Yugoslav Radiotelevision (JRT) (1956-1990); Croatian Radiotelevision (HRT) (1990-present)

Links
- Website: hrt.hr

Slika Hrvatske (Picture Croatian) is a television show which aired on Croatian Radio Television, the national public broadcaster Croatian Republic to Croats Abroad.

== Topics ==
Emissions Figure Croatian gave the information about the Croatian history, culture and heritage as well as news and entertainment programs to interest Croats abroad.

In the last episode, the show is dealt with themes Health Education in Croatian school ma. Editor-in-Chief Dean Sosa abolished the show, sparking a controversy in the public because the head of Carolina Vidovic Kristo in the program read a letter from a viewer that the introduction of sex education in Croatian schools equated with sexual abuse of children and youth. Featured are clips from the movie The Kinsey Syndrome on Controversial sexologist Alfred Kinsey.

== Logo history ==
Years	Description
June 1990-January 1994	HTV with white font, and shadow
January 1994-March 1995	HRT with white font, and shadow.
March 1995-September 1998	Thick, main logo of HRT.
September 1998-14 May 2006	Stylized colour SAT in square.
15 May 2006 – present day	Present logo of HRT SAT, with a higher resolution version.
