= Kontraplan =

Kontraplan is a talk show broadcast live on Croatian Radiotelevision between 2005 and 2007. Its unique feature was that each guest was located in a separate studio set at a location which defined their background, such as their office or home. One guest as a rule shared the studio with the host to provide an objective, analytical role in the debate.

Kontraplan was a controversial TV show with no limits set to selecting participants or subjects: the guests invited to the show often confronted each other's views on any of the chosen segments of public life, sports, or current affairs, collectively contributing to a different take on a subject. The international embezzlement scandal involving allegations of money laundering through local branches of Hypo Alpe-Adria-Bank International bank was publicly talked about for the first time in Kontraplan.

== Production team ==
Author and host of the show was journalist and TV producer Dubravko Merlić, who later won the Rose d'Or award for The Pyramid series in 2007.

- Co-writer - Željko Matić
- Journalist - Ana Jergović
- Director - Danko Volarić

== Sources ==
- Hypo Alpe Adria-A Bank Scandal in Austria
- Transcript of conversation Ferdinand Jukić and Dubravko Merlić
- Austria's ORF bought report from show Counter Angle
- Die Zeit, Bankenskandal
