= HRT Plus =

Croatian satellite channel

- Country: Croatia
- Headquarters: Zagreb

Programming
- Picture format: 576i (4:3 SDTV)

Ownership
- Owner: Hrvatska radiotelevizija
- Sister channels: HRT 1 HRT 2 HRT 3 HRT 4

History
- Launched: 28 March 2004; 21 years ago
- Closed: 13 September 2012; 13 years ago (8 years, 169 days)

Links
- Website: www.hrt.hr

HRT Plus was a Croatian satellite channel owned by the public service broadcaster, HRT. The channel was available via Hot Bird, cable and Max TV, in Croatia and parts of Europe, America, and Australia.

== History ==
Before the launch of HRT Plus on 29 March 2004, HRT 3 provided sports programming since 7 November 1994 until 28 March 2004. The next day, HRT Plus was launched, with the HRT 3 frequency denationalized and transferred to RTL Croatia.

On 19 April 2004, HRT Plus started broadcasting. The channel broadcast for sixteen hours a day from 10am to 2am. In October 2005, plans to replace HRT Plus were outlined, initially by a dedicated HRT Sport channel in a three-to-six month period, before later replacing the plan with the return of HRT 3 in November 2005, with no tentative launch date and no changes to the programming.

== Programmes ==
HRT Plus usually aired a variety of HRT's archived programmes from the 1930s to 1990s and sometimes sports. HRT 3 relaunched on 15 September 2012, with HRT Plus closing two days earlier, forwarding its frequency.
