= HRT International =

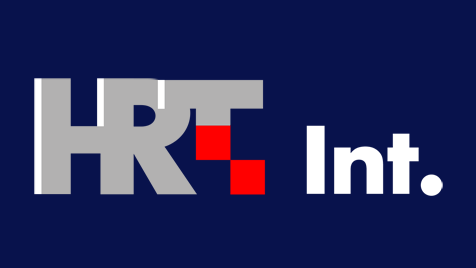
- Country: Croatia
- Broadcast area: International
- Network: Hrvatska Radiotelevizija
- Headquarters: Zagreb

Programming
- Language: Croatian
- Picture format: 1080p (HDTV)

Ownership
- Owner: Croatian Government
- Sister channels: HRT 1; HRT 2; HRT 3; HRT 4

History
- Launched: 1991; 35 years ago
- Former names: HRT Sat HRT 5

Links
- Website: hrt.hr

Availability

Terrestrial
- OiV: Eutelsat 16A

Streaming media
- HRTi: Watch live

HRT International (HRT Int.) is the international television service of Croatian Radiotelevision. The channel aims at the Croatian diaspora, especially in Europe, North America, South América, Australia and New Zealand.

== History ==
Broadcasts started in 1991 as HRT Sat, transitioning fully from analog to digital broadcasting in 1998. The channel was known as HRT - Satelitski program until the mid-2000s. A second international channel, Slika Hrvatske, existed until 2016, broadcasting eight hours a day to Europe, and then repeating the same programming block to North America and Oceania.

At the beginning of 2002, the channel was added to the digital FTA package of Hotbird 13E, up until then, it was available on Hotbird 5. From 1 February 2005, its signal to North America was made encrypted, as HRT joined the GlobeCast World TV platform.

=== HRT 5 ===
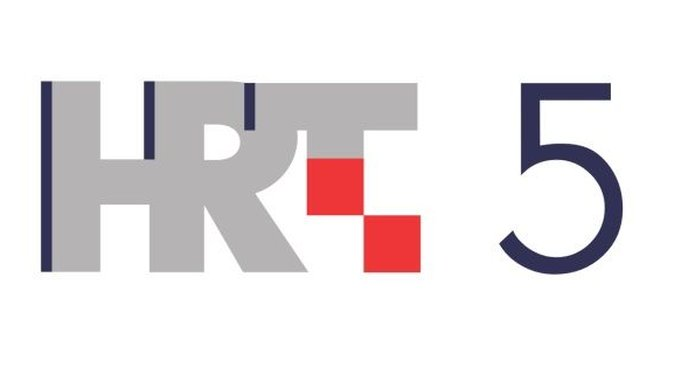
HRT 5 logo

In December 2017, HRT started testing a new version of its international channel, this time under the name HRT 5 (or HTV 5). The channel was created per a new agreement between Croatian Radiotelevision and the Government of Croatia in September. HRT was responsible for 70% of the productions seen on the new channel. Later that month, tests effectively began on Eutelsat 16B, airing color bars with the inscription "HR-HRTV ZGRB". On 28 December, the channel started testing on Hotbird 13C with actual programs.

The new version of the international channel started broadcasting on 1 January 2018. Original content at launch included news bulletins (in German, English and Spanish), programs about tourism and programs about specific Croatian diasporas, such as Croats living in Bosnia and Herzegovina. In April 2018, HRT 5 was made official on Hotbird thanks to a multi-year agreement with Eutelsat.

=== HRT International ===
On 1 January 2019, the channel adopted its current name (HRT International), without changing its content. On 12 January 2021, the channel started broadcasting in high definition. The SD signal for Europe was switched off on 1 April. Service on Hotbird 13C ended on 1 January 2023, moving entirely to Eutelsat 16A.
