= Mjenjačnica =

- The title card for the series
- Genre: Reality series; Documentary
- Created by: Robert Knjaz
- Country of origin: Croatia
- Original language: Croatian
- No. of seasons: 2
- No. of episodes: 28 (list of episodes)

Production
- Producer: Hrvoje Osvadić
- Running time: 45 minutes

Original release
- Network: RTL
- Release: 12 January 2005 – 30 May 2006

Related
- Koledžicom po svijetu; Knjazalište

Mjenjačnica ("The Exchange Office") is a Croatian documentary reality television series created and hosted by Robert Knjaz. The series documents prominent Croatian public figures as they exchange roles with the members of the working class.

Mjenjačnica debuted on RTL on 12 January 2005, and concluded with its second and final season on 30 May 2006. The series has later been re-run on RTL 2 and re-released on RTL's streaming service Voyo.

Following the conclusion of Mjenjačnica, Knjaz created Koledžicom po svijetu, a similar series where celebrities were taken to exotic destinations; it premiered on RTL in 2007. In 2023, Knjaz went on to create Knjazalište, another series similar to Mjenjačnica that ran on HRT 1.

== Format ==
The series features well-known figures from Croatian public life who, for one day, switch roles with individuals from working-class or rural backgrounds. The celebrities learn about the job and experience a different side of life, helping viewers with confronting their own prejudices about various professions.

== Episodes ==
Season	Episodes	Originally released	
Season	Episodes	First released	Last released
1	14	12 January 2005	13 April 2005
2	14	28 February 2006	30 May 2006

=== Season 1 (2005) ===
The series debuted on 12 January 2005 and was broadcast every Wednesday.

No. overall	No. in series	Title	Original release date
1	1	"Goran Ivanišević kao djelatnik čistoće"	12 January 2005
In the first episode, the Croatian professional tennis player Goran Ivanišević took on the role of a sanitation worker, working a day as a waste collector.
2	2	"Indira kao zidar"	19 January 2005
The singer Indira (Colonia) attempts plastering, tiling, and reinforcing under the guidance of Ivač, a skilled and experienced construction worker.
3	3	"Mamić kao baletan"	26 January 2005
Football administrator Zdravko Mamić spends a day working as a ballet dancer.
4	4	"Severina kao majka 17-ero djece"	2 February 2005
Pop singer Severina exchanges places with a mother of seventeen children.
5	5	"Vesna Škare-Ožbolt kao poljoprivrednik"	9 February 2005
The episode featured politician Vesna Škare-Ožbolt working as a farmer.
6	6	"Željko Pervan kao svećenik"	16 February 2005
7	7	"Mirko Cro Cop kao poštar"	23 February 2005
8	8	"Željko Kerum kao beskućnik"	2 March 2005
9	9	"Hladno pivo kao specijalci"	9 March 2005
10	10	"Edo Maajka kao slijepa osoba"	16 March 2005
11	11	"Nina Badrić"	23 March 2005
12	12	"Ćiro kao teta u vrtiću"	30 March 2005
13	13	"Milan Bandić kao metalac"	6 April 2005
Milan Bandić, the mayor of Zagreb, spent a day working as a steel mill worker.
14	14	"Davor Gobac kao umirovljenica"	13 April 2005

=== Season 2 (2006) ===
The second season premiered on 28 February 2006. The season aired every Tuesday.

No. overall	No. in series	Title	Original release date
15	1	"Prljavo kazalište kao vatrogasci"	28 February 2006
16	2	"Niko Kranjčar kao veterinar"	7 March 2006
17	3	"Zlatan Zuhrić Zuhra kao kaskader"	14 March 2006
18	4	"Željko Mavrović kao pjevačica"	21 March 2006
19	5	"Ivano Balić kao trener delfina"	28 March 2006
20	6	"Miroslav Škoro kao ribar"	4 April 2006
21	7	"Blanka Vlašić kao pastir"	11 April 2006
22	8	"Pisci kao GSS"	18 April 2006
The episode featured various writers working for GSS.
23	9	"Danijela Martinović kao ovisnik"	25 April 2006
Danijela Martinović lived as a former drug addict.
24	10	"Krunoslav Kićo Slabinac kao dimnjačar"	2 May 2006
25	11	"Anto Đapić kao organizator svatova"	9 May 2006
26	12	"Ljubo Ćesić Rojs kao Neven Ciganović"	16 May 2006
27	13	"Toni Cetinski kao kamenoklesar"	23 May 2006
28	14	"The Best Of"	30 May 2006
