= Vedrana Rudan =

Croatian journalist and novelist (1949–2026)

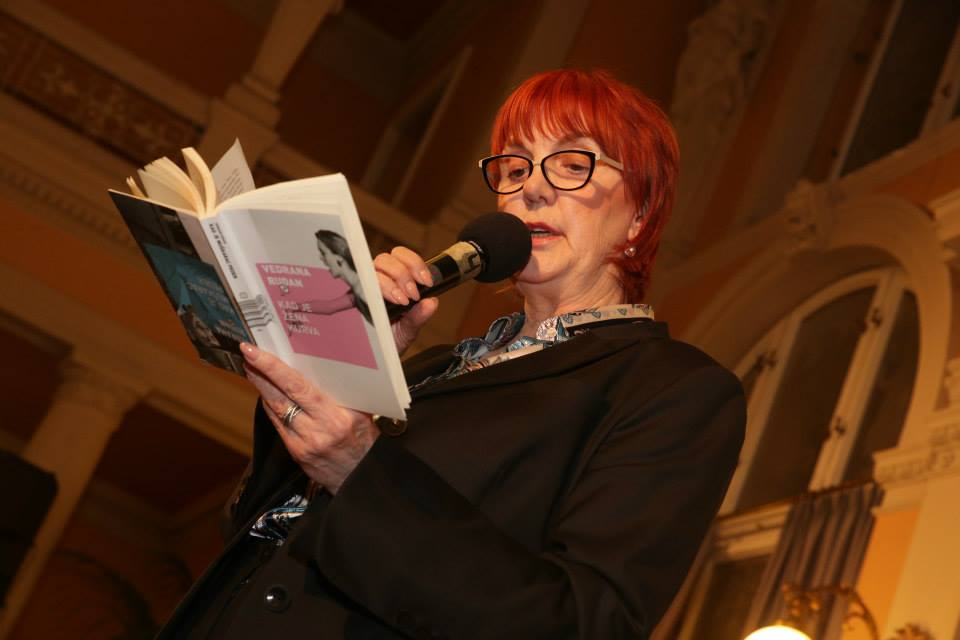
- Rudan in 2015
- Born: 29 October 1949; Opatija, PR Croatia, FPR Yugoslavia
- Died: 18 August 2026 (aged 76); Rijeka, Croatia
- Occupations: Journalist; novelist; social commentator
- Spouse: Ljubiša Drageljević
- Children: 2
- Writing career
- Years active: 2002–2026
- Website: rudan.info

Vedrana Rudan (29 October 1949 – 18 August 2026) was a Croatian journalist, novelist and social commentator. She authored seventeen books, including the novels Night (2002), Love at Last Sight (2003), and Mothers and Daughters (2010); her writing often provoked strong reactions from the public. As a social commentator, she was known for her direct and uncompromising style, which earned her mainstream popularity.

== Background ==
Vedrana Rudan was born in Opatija, Yugoslavia, in 1949 and raised in Mošćenička Draga. Through her father, a fisherman and a gardener, she had roots from Herzegovina. Through her mother, a kindergarten principal, she had roots from Lika. Her mother left her kindergarten job under pressure from her family, after which she suffered from depression and alcoholism, and was confined to a psychiatric hospital.

In 1973, she graduated from the University of Rijeka's Teacher Training College with a degree in Croatian and German languages. She worked as a teacher, tourist guide, a writer for several Croatian newspapers (Feral Tribune, Slobodna Dalmacija, Novi list, Jutarnji list), and as a journalist for the state radio.

In 1991, she was fired from her job at Radio Rijeka for her criticism of President Franjo Tuđman. After her husband was laid off from his job, they opened a real-estate agency. She wrote for Nacional, Croatia's biggest newspaper, until 2011.

From 2010 to 2015, she wrote about everyday themes on her very widely read blog called "How to Die Without Stress" ("Kako umrijeti bez stresa"). She stopped writing her blog on 21 August 2015 as "all that we write about is hatred. I do not know anymore where we are, whether we are in 2015, 1991 or 1941. There is still an active hunt on Serbs going on all wrapped up in a struggle for the right of the Croatian nation. Right for what? Hunger, misery, loans?" Her last post "I Give Up" ("Odustajem") was read around 50,000 times.

In 2017, she signed the Declaration on the Common Language of the Croats, Serbs, Bosniaks, and Montenegrins.

== Literary career ==
Having lost her journalism job, Rudan began writing fiction. Her first novel, Night (Croatian: Uho, grlo, nož), came out in 2002. A plotless monologue by an embittered and unhappily married woman, Tonka Babić, it was well-received for its feminist theme and strident, furious voice. Her second book, Love at Last Sight (Croatian: Ljubav na posljednji pogled; 2003), was a powerful plaint against marital abuse, written from her own experience of her first marriage. Rudan explained that she wrote it as a catharsis, and to encourage other women in the same position, but added that the trauma experienced by an abused woman could hardly be cured by one book.

By the time of her fourth book, Crnci u Firenci (2006), Rudan had established herself as a polemicist and controversial author. The alternating points of view of the narrators, all members of an extended Rijeka household, were a new development in the complexity of Rudan's work, and the linked monologues were compared to the film American Beauty. But while she was able to portray each of her narrators convincingly, there was little to distinguish between them.

Rudan's next book, Kad je žena kurva / kad je muškarac peder (2007), was a compilation of columns originally published in the weekly Nacional. In them, she continued to deal with issues such as violence against women, machismo, imposed patterns of behaviour in traditional society, political corruption, and poverty. In 2014, the book was adapted for the stage as Kurva, directed by Zijah Sokolović, which was lauded as a mix of shocking, happy, tragic, bizarre and realistic tones, and captured Rudan's distinctive voice.

In her 2010 book, Mothers and Daughters (Croatian: Dabogda te majka rodila), she turned her attention to the fraught relationship between mothers and daughters. Once again, this book was based on her own experience. She and her mother were not always as close as they might have been; she felt guilt and anguish when her mother died; and felt daily that her mother was still watching and judging her and finding her wanting.

== Controversies ==
Rudan was accused of antisemitism twice. In a column in Nacional, she complained that Croatian Jews condemn some right-wing nationalists as fascists while condoning others who have close ties with Israel. In 2009, Rudan made statements during International Holocaust Remembrance Day on Nova TV, comparing the situation in Gaza to the Holocaust. She was subsequently dismissed from further appearances in the network, for which she claimed the reason was that the owner of Nova TV, Ronald Lauder, belonged to the World Jewish Council.

In 2011, Rudan was laid off from Nacional for calling the Catholic Church "a criminal organisation".

== Personal life and death ==
Rudan was married to Ljubiša Drageljević, a lawyer, and lived in Rijeka. She had a son and a daughter from her first marriage. Rudan recounted the marital abuse from her first husband over fourteen years of marriage. She began her relationship with Drageljević while she was still married.

"I want to say that there are a great many people who love me, and that I love them. And that I am immortal. Let them understand my death as leaving for an area with no reception."

— Vedrana Rudan, Nedjeljom u 2, 2 March 2025, as her final message to the public

In May 2024, she stated she had been diagnosed with cholangiocarcinoma and that she was dying. In March 2025 on Nedjeljom u 2, she told Aleksandar Stanković that she had begun the process of assisted suicide in Switzerland, but had given up due to overcomplicated bureaucracy and physical weakness that prevented her from traveling there.

She underwent stereotactic body radiotherapy (SBRT) to ablate her liver metastases, followed by surgery and hyperbaric oxygen therapy (HBOT) to treat complications from the radiotherapy. On 18 August 2026, Rudan died from the disease at the age of 76. Her official Facebook profile announced her passing by posting the statement: "Vedrana left for an area with no reception."

Public figures who paid tribute to Rudan following her passing include Nina Badrić, Ana Bekuta, Ceca, Ivica Dačić, Srđan Dragojević, Miljenko Jergović, Dejan Jović, Anđelo Jurkas, Julijana Matanović, Nina Obuljen Koržinek, Katarina Peović, Ida Prester, Severina, Aleksandar Stanković and Aleksandar Vučić.

== Bibliography ==
List of books published by Vedrana Rudan
Title	Year	Genre	English edition	Notes
Uho, grlo, nož	2002	Novel	Night (2004)	
Ljubav na posljednji pogled	2003	Novel	Love at Last Sight (2017)	
Ja, nevjernica	2005	Collection of columns	—N/a	Contains columns originally published in Nacional and Feral Tribune.
Crnci u Firenci	2006	Novel	—N/a	
Kad je žena kurva / kad je muškarac peder	2007	Collection of columns	—N/a	Contains columns originally published in Nacional.
Strah od pletenja	2009	Collection of columns	—N/a	Contains material originally published in Feral Tribune and Nacional.
Dabogda te majka rodila	2010	Novel	Mothers and Daughters (2018)	
Kosturi okruga Madison	2012	Novel	—N/a	
U zemlji krvi i idiota	2013	Collection of columns and other texts	—N/a	Contains texts originally published in Nacional and on Rudan's blog.
Amaruši	2013	Novel	—N/a	Substantially revised and republished as Besplatna dostava in 2023.
Zašto psujem	2015	Collection of columns	—N/a	Contains texts originally published on Rudan's blog, selected by the editor Vladimir Arsenijević.
Muškarac u grlu	2016	Novel	—N/a	
Život bez krpelja	2018	Collection of columns	—N/a	Contains columns originally published on Rudan's blog.
Ples oko Sunca	2019	Autobiography	—N/a	
Puding od vanilije	2021	Collection of columns	—N/a	Contains columns originally published on Rudan's blog, selected by the editor Jasmina Radojičić.
Doživotna robija	2022	Novel	—N/a	
Umrijeti bez stresa	2024	Publicistic writing	—N/a	Contains texts originally published on Rudan's blog.
Kao da me ima	2026	Publicistic writing		
