= TV kalendar =

- Country of origin: Croatia
- Original language: Croatian

Production
- Production company: Croatian Radiotelevision

Original release
- Network: HRT 1
- Release: 1976 – present

TV kalendar (English: TV Calendar) is a daily historical documentary television series produced and broadcast by Croatian Radiotelevision (HRT) on HRT 1, its first channel. Running continuously since 1976 and spanning more than 13,850 episodes, it is one of the HRT's most enduring television programs.

== History ==
The programme was launched at the inspiration of Žarko Božić, former director of Television Zagreb. The first episode of was aired by the first channel of Radio Television Zagreb, then part of Yugoslav Radio Television, on January 3, 1976. The first collaborators of the show were Pavao Cindrić, a known historian from Zagreb, and Matko Peić, a versatile art expert. From 1976 to 1986 TV kalendar was jointly edited by Obrad Kosovac and Vladimir Fučijaš, leading a small team of collaborators. Fučijaš then became the sole editor until his retirement in 2001, when Kosovac returned to the editorial position. Kosovac retired at the end of 2010, and was succeeded by Vladimir Brnardić, a historian.

The programme often explored and discovered the events that failed, and first showed off many less known movie documents. In Sweden, the show's crew recorded the oldest Croatian flags from Thirty Years' War. They discovered the first Croatian pilots, Viktor Klobučar and Dragutin Novak, and found that the first speech in Croatian in the Parliament was held in 1809 and not in 1832, as has been said before. Even the famous Croatian singer Josip Kašman from 1895 could be heard, and the oldest preserved film recorded in Croatia at the end of the 19th century with the title Maneuver of the Austro-Hungarian Navy could be seen in the show. The show also reminded of the unusual encounter between the French Emperor Napoleon and Josip Jelačić, the future Croatian ban. Viewers help the editors of the show with historical research, so unknown events and human destinies, such as American heroes of Croatian origin Louis Cukela and Petar Herceg Tomić or forgotten artists Drage Hauptfeld and Mijo Čorak Slavenske have been revealed. The TV calendar was awarded in 1979 by the Golden Feather of the Society of Journalists of Croatia, also it received many compliments, like 10-minute giant or Favorite Professor of History. Especially emphasized is the richness of content and film material.

== Broadcast ==
TV kalendar used to be shown at 19:15 — just before the evening news — garnering high ratings, but has since been rescheduled to a less popular morning time slot. As of 2022, it is aired at 6:30 (HRT 1), repetitions are at 11:45 (HRT 1) and 16:00 (HRT 2).

Apart from airing on television, some contributions from the show can be seen on the show's Facebook page. The number of its users is constantly increasing. Currently, there are more than 10,000 active followers of the page, while the content of the site reaches almost 100,000 users.
