= Luda kuća (TV series) =

- Genre: Comedy
- Created by: Tanja Kirhmajer; Zinka Kiseljak
- Country of origin: Croatia
- Original language: Croatian
- No. of seasons: 5
- No. of episodes: 173 (list of episodes)

Original release
- Network: HRT 1
- Release: 28 September 2005 – 26 June 2010

Luda kuća ("Crazy House") is a Croatian comedy television series created by Tanja Kirhmajer and Zinka Kiseljak. The series ran from 28 September 2005 to 26 June 2010 on HRT.

== Cast ==
- Ljubo Zečević as Miljenko Majer
- Jelena Miholjević as Matilda Majer
- Nada Gačešić-Livaković as Božena Mužić Voloder
- Branko Meničanin as Velibor "Laci" Lacko
- Goran Grgić as Zdenko Voloder
- Ljubomir Kapor as Đuro Pletikosa
- Marinko Prga as Slavko Bedeković
- Ivan Glowatzky as Filip Majer
- Matija Prskalo as Lidija Devčić
- Vera Zima as Brankica Bedeković

== Series overview ==
Season	Episodes	Originally released	
Season	Episodes	First released	Last released
1	35	28 September 2005	24 May 2006
2	32	9 October 2006	14 May 2007
3	34	10 October 2007	28 May 2008
4	38	8 October 2008	1 July 2009
5	34	4 November 2009	26 June 2010
