= Ogresta =

Ogresta is a surname. Notable people with the surname include:

- Željka Ogresta (born 1963), Croatian journalist and television presenter
- Zrinko Ogresta (born 1958), Croatian screenwriter and film director
