= List of Luda kuća episodes =

Episodes of Croatian comedy television series

Luda kuća is a Croatian comedy television series that ran on HRT. The series comprised 173 episodes over five seasons. It was broadcast from 28 September 2005 to 26 June 2010.

== Series overview ==
Season	Episodes	Originally released	
Season	Episodes	First released	Last released
1	35	28 September 2005	24 May 2006
2	32	9 October 2006	14 May 2007
3	34	10 October 2007	28 May 2008
4	38	8 October 2008	1 July 2009
5	34	4 November 2009	26 June 2010

=== Season 1 (2005–06) ===
No. overall	No. in season	Title	Original release date
1	1	"1. epizoda"	28 September 2005
2	2	"2. epizoda"	5 October 2005
3	3	"Daj dim..."	12 October 2005
4	4	"Hrkanje"	19 October 2005
5	5	"Stare ljubavi"	26 October 2005
6	6	"6. epizoda"	2 November 2005
7	7	"Ljubavi i ostale bolesti"	9 November 2005
8	8	"Džoker zovi"	16 November 2005
9	9	"9. epizoda"	23 November 2005
10	10	"Moja mama najbolje kuha"	30 November 2005
11	11	"Tako se tuče, taj se voli"	7 December 2005
12	12	"Vodene kozice"	14 December 2005
13	13	"13. epizoda"	21 December 2005
14	14	"Ovce"	28 December 2005
15	15	"Gutljaj zadovoljstva"	4 January 2006
16	16	"Vjetar i voda"	11 January 2006
17	17	"Lassie se vraca kući"	18 January 2006
18	18	"Prosidba"	25 January 2006
19	19	"19. epizoda"	1 February 2006
20	20	"Podstanar"	8 February 2006
21	21	"Vrtni patuljak"	15 February 2006
22	22	"Poskok"	22 February 2006
23	23	"Majmun-točka-com"	1 March 2006
24	24	"Lektira ili majmunska posla"	8 March 2006
25	25	"Stihove napisala..."	15 March 2006
26	26	"Znanje je moć"	22 March 2006
27	27	"Maturalac"	29 March 2006
28	28	"Grunt"	5 April 2006
29	29	"Fakultet"	12 April 2006
30	30	"Rođendan"	19 April 2006
31	31	"Mi se znamo?"	26 April 2006
32	32	"Peglanje"	3 May 2006
33	33	"Kuhanje"	10 May 2006
34	34	"Zaručnici"	17 May 2006
35	35	"U dobru i u zlu..."	24 May 2006

=== Season 2 (2006–07) ===
No. overall	No. in season	Title	Original release date
36	1	"Na tvojoj ruci prsten"	9 October 2006
37	2	"Trener"	16 October 2006
38	3	"Zimnica"	23 October 2006
39	4	"Rusija"	30 October 2006
40	5	"Siva ekonomija"	6 November 2006
41	6	"Usvojenje"	13 November 2006
42	7	"Antikvarijat"	20 November 2006
43	8	"Otkaz"	27 November 2006
44	9	"Mramor, kamen i željezo"	4 December 2006
45	10	"Kolinje"	11 December 2006
46	11	"Skidajte se do kraja"	18 December 2006
47	12	"Mišolovka"	25 December 2006
48	13	"Sretna nova!"	1 January 2007
49	14	"Starački dom"	8 January 2007
50	15	"Golf"	15 January 2007
51	16	"Brak ili mrak"	22 January 2007
52	17	"Svjedoci"	29 January 2007
53	18	"Pokvareni telefon"	5 February 2007
54	19	"Jarmila"	12 February 2007
55	20	"Maskenbal"	19 February 2007
56	21	"Ukazanje"	26 February 2007
57	22	"Povišica"	5 March 2007
58	23	"Artisti i modeli"	12 March 2007
59	24	"Hipnoza"	19 March 2007
60	25	"Amerika"	26 March 2007
61	26	"Soba s pogledom"	2 April 2007
62	27	"Povrat duga"	9 April 2007
63	28	"Maslina je neobrana"	16 April 2007
64	29	"Muke po gruntovnici"	23 April 2007
65	30	"Treće poluvrijeme"	30 April 2007
66	31	"Za sreću je potreban san"	7 May 2007
67	32	"Epilog"	14 May 2007

=== Season 3 (2007–08) ===
No. overall	No. in season	Title	Original release date
68	1	"Kora od banane"	10 October 2007
69	2	"Karmine"	17 October 2007
70	3	"Usamljena srca"	24 October 2007
71	4	"Vatrogasci"	31 October 2007
72	5	"Prokletstvo Majerovih"	7 November 2007
73	6	"Donator"	14 November 2007
74	7	"Neke važne stvari"	21 November 2007
75	8	"Detektivi"	28 November 2007
76	9	"Kuk"	5 December 2007
77	10	"Kako mama kaže"	12 December 2007
78	11	"Život piše romane"	19 December 2007
79	12	"Plesna škola"	26 December 2007
80	13	"Plus minus"	2 January 2008
81	14	"Mutna sjećanja"	9 January 2008
82	15	"Dobri umiru prvi"	16 January 2008
83	16	"Hallo, pizza"	23 January 2008
84	17	"Bejbisiterica"	30 January 2008
85	18	"Kratki spoj"	6 February 2008
86	19	"Na rubu zakona"	13 February 2008
87	20	"Black Jack"	20 February 2008
88	21	"Zamjena"	27 February 2008
89	22	"Mandule"	5 March 2008
90	23	"Nemoralna ponuda"	12 March 2008
91	24	"Skrivena kamera"	19 March 2008
92	25	"Krokodil Zdenko"	26 March 2008
93	26	"Infarkt"	2 April 2008
94	27	"Mrena"	9 April 2008
95	28	"Žena na službenom putu"	16 April 2008
96	29	"Slučaj Drago"	23 April 2008
97	30	"Gustav"	30 April 2008
98	31	"Strah od letenja"	7 May 2008
99	32	"Vrtić za pse"	14 May 2008
100	33	"Mravi"	21 May 2008
101	34	"Novi susjed"	28 May 2008

=== Season 4 (2008–09) ===
No. overall	No. in season	Title	Original release date
102	1	"Stepenice za raj"	8 October 2008
103	2	"Norveška ekspres"	15 October 2008
104	3	"Radio Parangal"	22 October 2008
105	4	"Spasimo šišmiše"	29 October 2008
106	5	"Vikend za dvoje"	5 November 2008
107	6	"Ostavljeni očevi"	12 November 2008
108	7	"Crvenkapica, sedam vukova i jedan lovac"	19 November 2008
109	8	"Treća sreća"	26 November 2008
110	9	"Oko sokolovo"	3 December 2008
111	10	"Izbor desetljeća"	10 December 2008
112	11	"Baby alarm"	17 December 2008
113	12	"Božićna viroza"	24 December 2008
114	13	"Nevolje s bakom"	7 January 2009
115	14	"Čovječe, ne ljuti se"	14 January 2009
116	15	"Đurin rođendan"	21 January 2009
117	16	"Puževi"	28 January 2009
118	17	"Što muskarci vole?š"	4 February 2009
119	18	"Novi izazovi"	11 February 2009
120	19	"Nevolje s Hansom"	18 February 2009
121	20	"Ping-pong"	25 February 2009
122	21	"Diplomac"	4 March 2009
123	22	"Memoari"	11 March 2009
124	23	"Neki to vole hladno"	18 March 2009
125	24	"Jabuka znanja"	25 March 2009
126	25	"Sutra je novi dan"	1 April 2009
127	26	"Matica i trutovi"	8 April 2009
128	27	"Uši i ostale domaće životinje"	15 April 2009
129	28	"Ugrožena vrsta"	22 April 2009
130	29	"Gaće za sto eura"	29 April 2009
131	30	"Gospon grof"	6 May 2009
132	31	"Sedam i pol tjedana"	13 May 2009
133	32	"Prsten"	20 May 2009
134	33	"Kazn from Amerika"	27 May 2009
135	34	"Čistoća je pola zdravlja"	3 June 2009
136	35	"Devetorica hrabrih"	10 June 2009
137	36	"Voda"	17 June 2009
138	37	"Pasji život"	24 June 2009
139	38	"Preživljavanje"	1 July 2009

=== Season 5 (2009–10) ===
No. overall	No. in season	Title	Original release date
140	1	"Sretna umirovljenica"	4 November 2009
141	2	"Ženska ruka"	11 November 2009
142	3	"Prosidbe"	25 November 2009
143	4	"Poljubac Žene kameleonke"	2 December 2009
144	5	"Osveta ostavljene kćeri"	9 December 2009
145	6	"Sprave i ostala pomagala"	16 December 2009
146	7	"Padobranci"	23 December 2009
147	8	"Uspavanka za Boženu M."	30 December 2009
148	9	"Sprechen sie Deutsch?"	6 January 2010
149	10	"Tablete"	9 January 2010
150	11	"Silom veterinar"	16 January 2010
151	12	"Švedski poučak"	23 January 2010
152	13	"Moj muž je vampir"	30 January 2010
153	14	"Služba spašavanja"	6 February 2010
154	15	"Tajna Lenjinove biste"	13 February 2010
155	16	"Kolut natrag"	20 February 2010
156	17	"Duh u boci"	27 February 2010
157	18	"Dizalo iz pakla"	6 March 2010
158	19	"Bonkasi"	13 March 2010
159	20	"Glasnogovornici"	20 March 2010
160	21	"Trinaesto prase"	27 March 2010
161	22	"Slučajni paparazzo"	3 April 2010
162	23	"Pošiljka iz Bombaja"	10 April 2010
163	24	"Šaptač glistama"	17 April 2010
164	25	"Silom dadilja"	24 April 2010
165	26	"Frape od jagoda"	1 May 2010
166	27	"Nije u novcima sve"	8 May 2010
167	28	"Noćni portir"	15 May 2010
168	29	"Dva pisma"	22 May 2010
169	30	"Samo večeras u vašem gradu"	29 May 2010
170	31	"Nevolje s kompom"	5 June 2010
171	32	"Pet minuta slave"	12 June 2010
172	33	"Najvažniji dan u životu Filipa Majera"	19 June 2010
173	34	"Sve se plaća"	26 June 2010
