= Dubravko Merlić =

Croatian journalist, television producer and author

CEO Dubravko Merlić
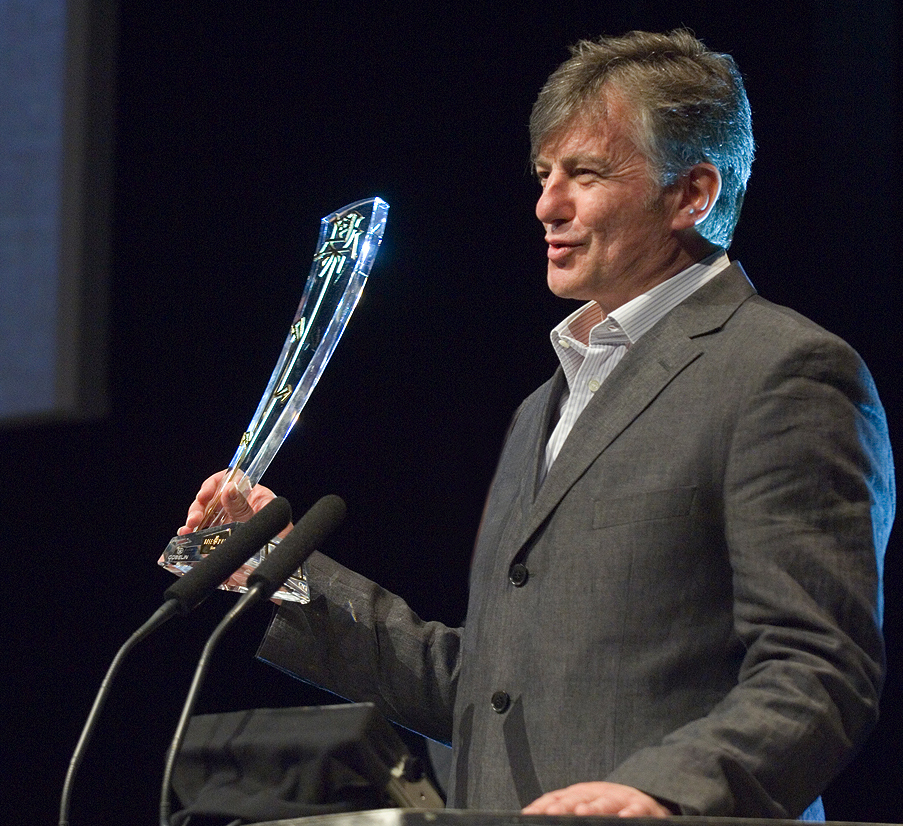
- Merlić winning Rose d'Or in 2007
- Born: 28 April 1960 (age 65); Zagreb, PR Croatia, Yugoslavia
- Education: Faculty of Humanities and Social Sciences
- Alma mater: University of Zagreb
- Occupations: Journalist; producer; author
- Years active: 1987–present
- Television: Croatian Radiotelevision; Nova TV
- Spouse: Željka Ogresta
- Children: 3
- Awards: Rose d'Or for The Pyramid

Dubravko Merlić (born 28 April 1960) is a Croatian journalist, television producer and author, known for his work as an actor, editor and anchor on the Croatian Radiotelevision and Nova TV. He is a winner of the 2007 Rose d'Or award for The Pyramid, a competitive talk show created by Castor Multimedia, a TV production company of which Merlić is currently the CEO.

== Biography ==
=== Early life ===
Born in Zagreb, Merlić graduated from the Zagreb Faculty of Philosophy in 1983, with a degree in literature, and taught Croatian language and literature in an elementary school in his hometown from 1984 to 1986. In 1987 he started his journalistic career with Radio Sljeme.

=== Television career ===
In 1990, Merlić left radio and moved to the Croatian Radiotelevision (HRT), then Televizija Zagreb. Between 1990 and 1991, he was an editor and anchor of HRT2 news.

From 1992 to 1996, Merlić was the editor and anchor of Slikom na sliku, an evening current events show that earned him the 1995 Journalist of the Year award from the Croatian Journalists' Association. Its concept was to show news segments from other television stations from the region, which generated high ratings, but proved politically controversial during the wartime. Slikom na sliku was under constant political pressure until its cancellation in 1996, which was, according to Merlić, initiated by the Office of the President of Croatia, Franjo Tuđman. After the cancellation, Merlić spent nearly two years without any assignments, while being still employed by the Croatian Radiotelevision.

From 2000 to 2001, he also worked as the chief editor of the news and current events programming at the HRT. In 2003, he founded the independent production company Castor Multimedia, whose main aim is the creation of original multimedia content, with special emphasis on the development of TV formats.

His show The Pyramid was recognized with the Rose d'Or award for the best show in 2007. The talk show, which presenter was his wife Željka Ogresta, was broadcast in 8 countries.

In 2009, Merlić, alongside singer Nina Badrić and actor Enis Bešlagić became a judge of the Supertalent, which is the Croatian version of the licensed show Got Talent.

Merlić worked as a member of a launching team of the regional cable 24 hours news channel N1 (CNN's SE Regional Partner) where he also performed as a News Director for N1 Croatia. He was responsible for the entire operation of this regional channel in Croatia (team of over 60 members) and for the coordination of the N1 Croatia with other two N1 channels in Bosnia and Herzegovina and Serbia. Beside that he also worked as the anchor and the editor of the talk show Pressing.

=== Personal life ===
Merlić is married to Croatian journalist and television presenter, Željka Ogresta, with whom he has three children: Maja, Marta and Matej.

== Bibliography ==
- Slikom na sliku (1995)
