= OIV =

OIV may refer to:

- Office International de la Vigne et du Vin or International Organisation of Vine and Wine
- OiV or Odašiljači i veze, a Croatian telecommunications operator
- Organismo Italiano di Valutazione or Italian Business Valuation Society

== See also ==
- S-OIV or Swine influenza
