= Sretni gradovi =

- Genre: Travel documentary
- Created by: Martina Validžić
- Directed by: Dubravko Prugovečki
- Country of origin: Croatia
- Original language: Croatian
- No. of seasons: 2
- No. of episodes: 12 (+1 special)

Production
- Producers: Sanja Knez; Ana-Marija Validžić
- Running time: 50–54 minutes

Original release
- Network: HRT 1
- Release: 4 October 2023 – 17 December 2024

Sretni gradovi (English: Happy Cities) is a Croatian travel documentary television series. In each episode, creator and host of the series, Martina Validžić, explores the culture of a selected city. The series airs on HRT 1.

The first season, which explores various European cities, premiered on 4 October and concluded on 8 November 2023. A Christmas special focusing on Rovaniemi followed on 25 December. The second season, focusing on American cities, premiered on 12 November 2024.

== Series overview ==
Season	Episodes	Originally released	
Season	Episodes	First released	Last released
1	6	4 October 2023	8 November 2023
1	Special	25 December 2023	
2	6	12 November 2024	17 December 2024

=== Season 1 (2023) ===
The first season was announced on 12 September 2023. It spawned six episodes, which were broadcast Tuesdays at 20:15 on HRT 1. The season focused on various European cities.

No. overall	No. in season	Title	Original release date
1	1	"Kopenhagen"	4 October 2023
2	2	"Reykjavík"	11 October 2023
3	3	"Lisabon"	18 October 2023
4	4	"Ljubljana"	25 October 2023
5	5	"Beč"	1 November 2023
6	6	"Rim"	8 November 2023
Special
–	–	"Rovaniemi"	25 December 2023

=== Season 2 (2024) ===
HRT announced the second season on 6 September 2024. The season explores various American cities.

No. overall	No. in season	Title	Original release date
7	1	"New York"	12 November 2024
8	2	"Nashville"	19 November 2024
9	3	"Miami"	26 November 2024
10	4	"San Francisco"	3 December 2024
11	5	"Anchorage"	10 December 2024
12	6	"Las Vegas"	17 December 2024

== Reception ==
Following its first season, Sretni gradovi won the Zlatni studio (English: Golden studio) award for the best television series.
