= Nedjeljom u dva =

- Also known as: Sunday at Two
- Genre: Talk show
- Presented by: Aleksandar Stanković
- Country of origin: Croatia

Production
- Production company: Croatian Radiotelevision

Original release
- Network: HRT 1
- Release: 8 October 2000 – present

Nedjeljom u dva (English: Sunday at Two) is a Croatian television talk show aired every Sunday afternoon at 14:00 CET on HRT 1 and hosted by Aleksandar Stanković.

The hour-long show usually features a single guest related to an important political, cultural or economic event that came to light recently. Each show usually starts with a brief segment introducing the person featured in the show, before turning into an almost hour-long interview between Stanković and his guest.

A number of prominent Croatian and international politicians, artists, musicians, scientists and athletes have appeared on the show, some to much ensuing media coverage and controversy after the fact.

== History ==
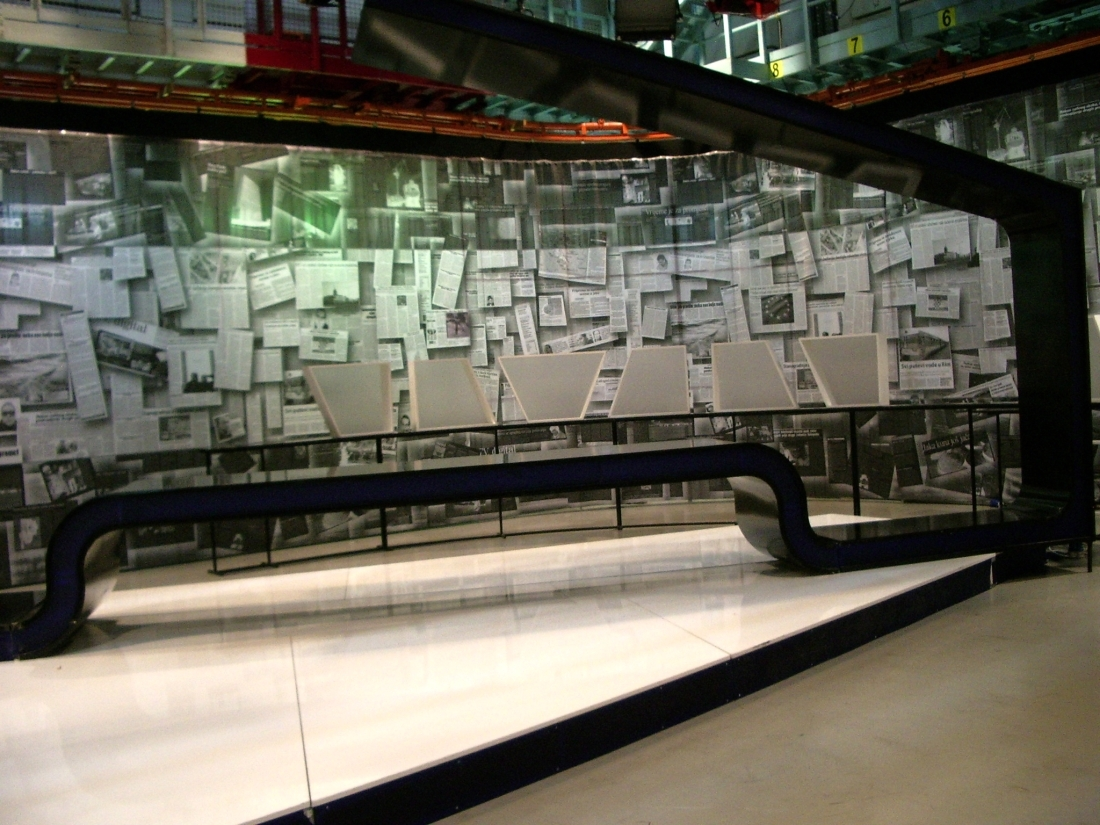
The interior of the HRT studio where the show is recorded.

The show, which first aired on 8 October 2000 with Ivo Sanader as guest, underwent some format changes throughout the years. Initially, the show had several other journalists joining Stanković during the interview. These were gradually dropped, and the show turned into an hour-long one-on-one interview. For a period, the show also had a small studio audience composed of journalism students, who were allowed to ask additional questions in the show's final part. The show also used to have phone-in polls with questions related to the current guest. Some editions were also taped beforehand in other locations.

Nedjeljom u dva quickly became one of the most popular HRT shows, mostly due to Stanković taking a polemical approach towards his guests. Notable guests include Zdravko Mamić, Zoran Milanović, Milan Bandić, Lepa Brena, Goran Bare, Slavoj Žižek, Toni Kukoč, Rambo Amadeus, Ivo Josipović, Mira Furlan, Boris Tadić, Boris Dvornik, Predrag Matvejević, Snježana Kordić, Vedrana Rudan, Ivan Gašparovič, Garry Kasparov, Emir Kusturica, Kolinda Grabar-Kitarović, Mirko Filipović, Dan Brown, and Tomislav Tomašević.

The only episode to date which Stanković didn't host aired on 18 March 2001. It was hosted by Mislav Bago and his guest that day was Stjepan Ivanišević. The reason behind this was that Stanković wanted to quit working on the show because he got scolded by one of his colleagues after she got objected by one of his guests.
