= HR Dubrovnik =

Dubrovnik; Croatia
- Frequencies: 97.2 MHz, 89.5 MHz, 103.8 MHz, 90.3 MHz, 106.5 MHz, 88.2 MHz, 103.7 MHz, 105.0 MHz, 106.2 MHz, 101.1 MHz

Programming
- Language: Serbocroatian language

Ownership
- Owner: Hrvatska radiotelevizija

History
- First air date: 1942; 84 years ago

Links
- Website: radio.hrt.hr/radio-dubrovnik/

Hrvatski radio Dubrovnik or Radio Dubrovnik is a regional affiliate radio station of HRT which broadcasts in Dubrovnik, Gruda, Korčula, Lastovo, Lopud, Rota, Slano, Srđ, Ston, Vela Luka, and Blato na Korčulu. It began broadcasting in 1942. After Radio Zagreb, it is the second oldest radio station in the surrounding area. It continued to broadcast throughout the Yugoslavian Civil War, providing important information to local residents.
