= Koledžicom po svijetu =

- The official logo for the series
- Genre: Reality; Travel documentary
- Created by: Robert Knjaz
- Written by: Dubravka Turić; Jelena Paljan
- Directed by: Marko Ferković; Miroslav Sikavica; Saša Ban; Zvonimir Jurić; Robert Knjaz
- Presented by: Robert Knjaz; Slavica Beštek
- Country of origin: Croatia
- Original language: Croatian
- No. of seasons: 2
- No. of episodes: 25

Production
- Executive producer: Hrvoje Osvadić
- Production locations: Africa, Asia, Europe, Oceania
- Running time: 45–60 minutes

Original release
- Network: RTL Televizija
- Release: 17 March 2007 – 10 June 2008

Related
- Mjenjačnica

Koledžicom po svijetu (Croatian for 'Around the World in Loafers') is a Croatian reality and travel documentary television series created and hosted by Robert Knjaz. Each episode featured a celebrity guest, who was taken by Knjaz to a distinctive, sometimes exotic and remote place of the world, as they were presented with the challenge of engaging with the local culture. The series featured segments hosted by Slavica Beštek (nicknamed 'Baka Slavica').

Following the conclusion of Knjaz's previous RTL documentary and reality series Mjenjačnica (2005–2006), that similarly dealt with celebrities being presented with various challenges, a press release from January 2007 confirmed Knjaz had been working on Koledžicom po svijetu. It premiered on 17 March 2007 and ran for two seasons until 10 June 2008, spanning 25 episodes. The series was filmed on various locations across Africa, Asia, Europe and Oceania.

The series was rereleased on RTL's streaming service Voyo. In 2018, various episodes were also uploaded by Knjaz on his official YouTube channel.

== Episodes ==
Season	Episodes	Originally released	
Season	Episodes	First released	Last released
1	14	17 March 2007	22 June 2007
2	11	1 April 2008	10 June 2008

=== Season 1 (2007) ===
No. overall	No. in season	Title	Original release date
1	1	"Nenad Korkut in Tirana"	17 March 2007
2	2	"Neno Pavinčić in Budapest"	24 March 2007
3	3	"Predrag Raos in Cairo"	31 March 2007
4	4	"Nina Violić in Japan"	13 April 2007
5	5	"Dalibor Matanić in Mumbai"	20 April 2007
Dalibor Matanić heads to India to undergo demanding training in hopes of earning a role in a Bollywood film.
6	6	"Jacques Houdek in Greenland"	27 April 2007
Jacques Houdek travels to the remote Greenland town of Sisimiut to see whether his performance can win over the local Inuit audience.
7	7	"Maja Šuput in Kenya"	4 May 2007
Maja Šuput is taken to a Maasai village beneath Kilimanjaro, where she takes on local challenges in hopes of impressing a warrior and becoming one of his wives.
8	8	"Joško Čagalj Jole in Scotland"	11 May 2007
Knjaz and his friend Jole travel to Scotland, where they dive into local kilt traditions and finally confront the age‑old question of whether Scots wear anything underneath.
9	9	"Indira Levak in Moscow"	18 May 2007
10	10	"Veljko Đorđević in Šutka"	25 May 2007
11	11	"Ivanka Mazurkijević in Thailand"	1 June 2007
Ivanka Mazurkijević travels to Bangkok and takes on a series of unusual good‑deed challenges, including helping with a newborn crocodile.
12	12	"Best of"	8 June 2007
A recap episode that highlights the most memorable moments of the season.
13	13	"Baka Slavica in Milan"	15 June 2007
Baka Slavica heads to Milan Fashion Week, where she becomes a runway model.
14	14	"Finale"	22 June 2007

=== Season 2 (2008) ===
No. overall	No. in season	Title	Original release date
15	1	"Vlatka Pokos in Fiji"	1 April 2008
16	2	"Rajko Dujmić in Australia"	8 April 2008
Robert Knjaz takes Rajko Dujmić on a trip across Australia to collect sounds his new song.
17	3	"Antimon Čulo in Finland"	15 April 2008
Antimon Čulo travels to Rovaniemi to take part in a competition to become Santa Claus's successor
18	4	"Mile Kekin in Dubai"	22 April 2008
Mile Kekin travels to Dubai to take on a series of challenges meant to prove he can earn a jet‑set status.
19	5	"Slaven Letica in New Zealand"	29 April 2008
Slaven Letica sets out on a journey to stop a magical threat spreading across several countries, leading him through New Zealand and toward Mordor in a parody adventure inspired by The Lord of the Rings.
20	6	"Željko Pervan in Slovenia"	6 May 2008
Željko Pervan travels through Slovenia on a Tomos motorcycle.
21	7	"Davor Gobac in Nepal"	13 May 2008
Gobac trains for a Himalayan expedition after meeting Knjaz in Kathmandu, travelling to a Sherpa village to prepare for an attempted ascent of Mount Everest.
22	8	"Natali Dizdar in Madrid"	20 May 2008
Robert Knjaz and Natali Dizdar join a travelling circus near Madrid, where they take part in various circus activities and interact with its performers.
23	9	"Episode 9"	27 May 2008
The episode presents a recap of earlier episodes, featuring previously unseen scenes.
24	10	"Baka Slavica and Radovan at the Cannes Film Festival"	3 June 2008
Grandma Slavica and Rajko travel to the French Riviera. Their trip includes creating perfumes, appearing at local events and taking part in activities in Cannes, Nice and Monte Carlo.
25	11	"Finale"	10 June 2008
The final episode of the series features Antimon and Gobac, chosen by public vote, competing in a series of tasks. Set in Zagorje, the contest is overseen by Grandma Slavica and Radovan Brebrić, with Đeki holding the final say on the outcome.
