= Dnevnik HRT =

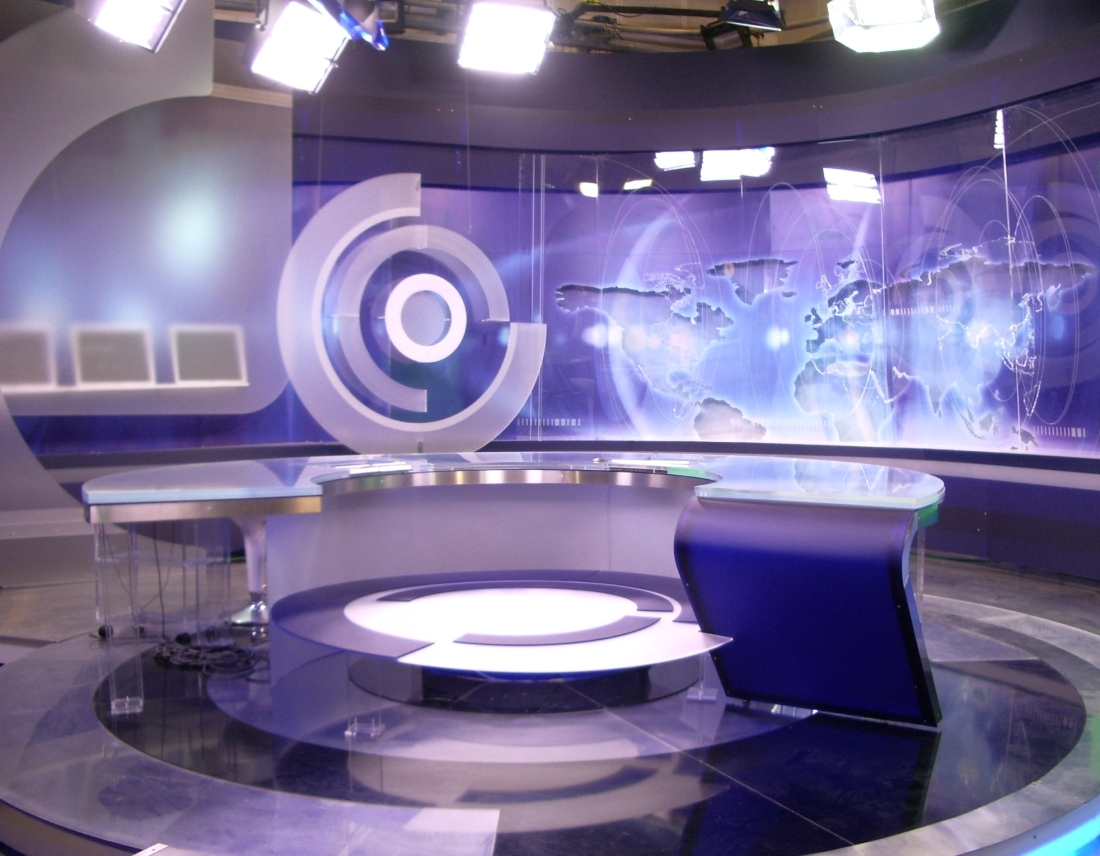
- Studio scenography in April 2009
- Genre: News program
- Presented by: Dnevnik 1 & Vijesti: Igor Dunaj; Kristina Bojić; Damir Smrtić; Dnevnik 2 & 3: Đurica Drobac; Marta Šimić Mrzlečki; Nika Marjanović Zulim
- Country of origin: Croatia
- Original language: Croatian

Production
- Editors: Dnevnik 1 & Vijesti: Ružica Renić Andrijanić, Nika Marjanović Zulim; Dnevnik 2: Anja Konosić, Branko Nađvinski, Mario Tomas; Dnevnik 3: Đurđica Plećaš, Damir Smrtić, Goran Brozović
- Camera setup: Multi-camera
- Running time: 65 minutes

Original release
- Network: HRT
- Release: 1 October 1968 – present

Dnevnik HRT is the main news program of the Croatian public broadcasting company Hrvatska radiotelevizija (HRT), broadcast daily at 12:00, 19:00 and around 23:00. It broadcasts mainly on HRT 1, as well as on HRT 4, where an additional sign language interpreter is employed and displayed on screen.

== History ==
Dnevnik HRT was started on 29 November 1956 within an experimental schedule on Zagreb TV as a weekly news broadcast. In 1959, the program was cancelled and replaced by then-Belgrade TV's Dnevnik, as the institution of the Yugoslav Radio Television (JRT) resulted in forming a unitary broadcasting schedule between Belgrade, Zagreb and Ljubljana TV. Zagreb TV was first employed to broadcast the JRT Dnevnik in January 1967, receiving approval to air its own daily Dnevnik program once again in October 1968. The reinstituted Dnevnik was broadcast three times per day.

In 1973, Dnevnik HRT became the first daily news program on JRT to employ its presenters full-time, which led to the presenters becoming symbolic of the program itself. These first full-time presenters were Silvije Hum, Obrad Kosovac and Miroslav Lilić.

Between the years 2004 and 2007, Dnevnik HRT was the most viewed news broadcast in the European Broadcasting Union, with an average viewership figure being 37% of Croatia's population, who watched 75% of each broadcast on average. The program introduced significant changes in 2015 — the airing time was moved from 19:30 to 19:00, each broadcast was expanded to a full hour, and presenter pairs were introduced, where presenters regularly appeared on broadcasts together. The presenter pairs, made up of Sanja Mikelušić-Pavić and Đurica Drobac, as well as Tina Šimurina and Stipe Alfier, were cancelled only a year later, in 2016.

In 2020, after two years of preparations, the program was relocated for the first time in thirty years, to Studio 12. This meant that the program was now filmed in the newly-built 320 m^{2} studio (as opposed to the previous 80 m^{2}), which also included modernization of the filming equipment and the first visual redesign of the program in five years. At the same time, the "Topic of the Day" segment was integrated into the main segment of the broadcast instead of being shown at the end, specialized on-the-scene reporters were employed and the broadcast was expanded to air for 65 minutes in total.

== Notable presenters ==
- Obrad Kosovac (1970–1984)
- Silvije Hum (1970–1985)
- Miroslav Lilić (1973–?)
- Mladen Stubljar (1988–1992)
- Denis Latin (1990–?)
- Tihomir Ladišić (1991–?)
- Nensi Brlek (1996–2004)
- Danko Družijanić (2001–2007)
- Goran Milić (2004–2011)
- Đurica Drobac (2005–2016; 2017 – present)
- Zoran Šprajc (2011–2012)
