= Aleksandar Stanković (journalist) =

Croatian journalist and TV host (born 1970)

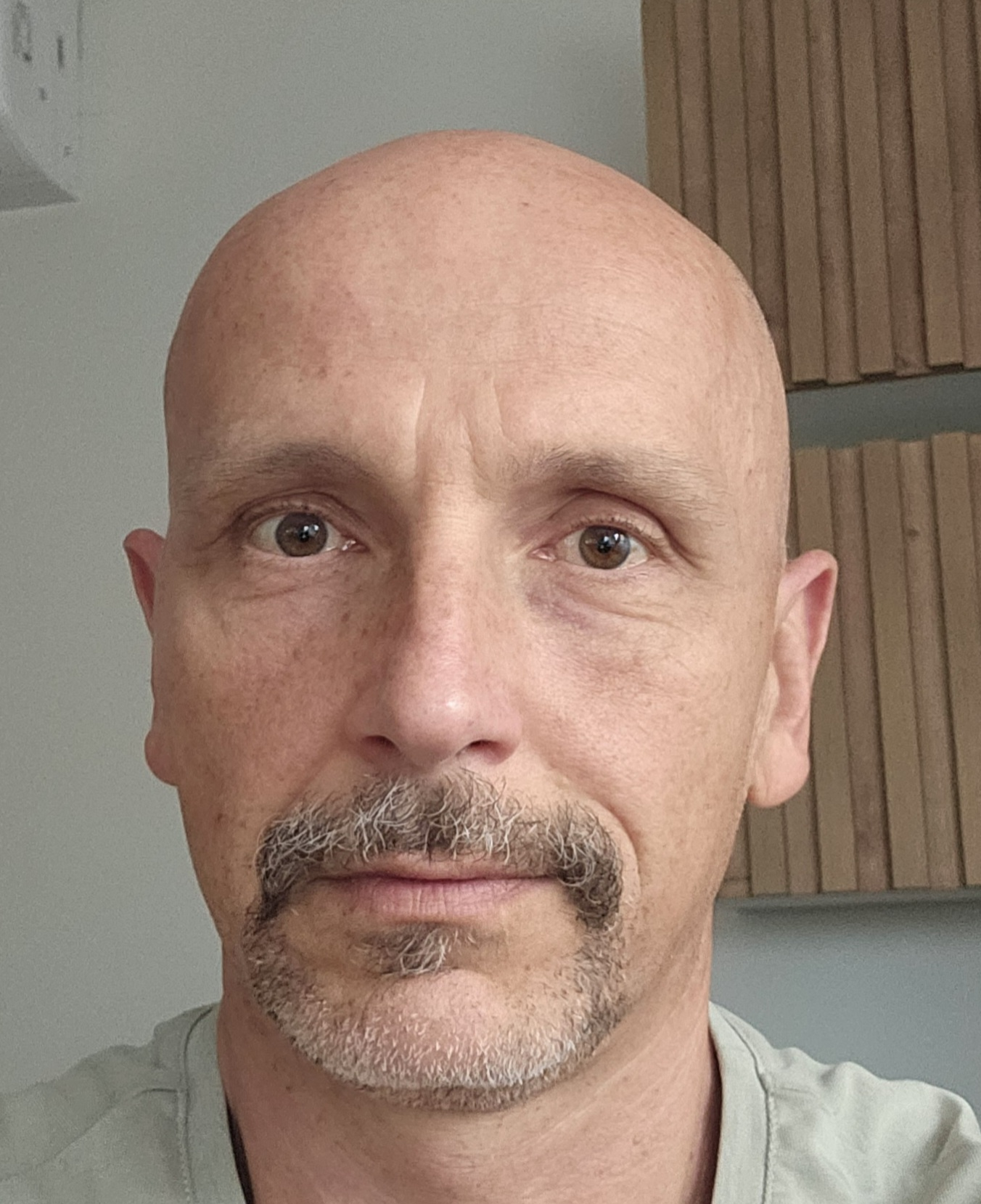
- Aleksandar Stanković
- Born: 8 April 1970 (age 56); Bačka Topola, SR Serbia, SFR Yugoslavia
- Education: Faculty of Law
- Alma mater: University of Zagreb
- Occupations: Television host; journalist; writer; actor
- Known for: Nedjeljom u dva
- Spouse: Željka Stanković (m. 2012)
- Children: 2

Aleksandar Stanković (born 8 April 1970) is a Croatian radio and television host, journalist and writer most famous for his show Nedjeljom u dva.

== Life ==
=== Early life and education ===
Stanković was born in Bačka Topola. In 1978, when he was 7, his family moved to Karlovac where he went to elementary school. His father, an officer in the Yugoslav People's Army, passed away when Stanković was 13. At 15 years old, in 1985, he moved to Zagreb with his mother to attend high school at the Center for Administration and Justice. He graduated from the Faculty of Law at the University of Zagreb in 1995.

=== Personal life ===
Aleksandar Stanković is married to Željka Stanković since 2012, with whom he has two children. He has been struggling with clinical depression since 2010, about which he wrote two books – Depra and F32 – in hopes to break up the stigma around the subject and to help people with similar conditions.

== Radio and television career ==
Soon after graduating Stanković got a job at Croatian Radio in the info–politics department. He was host of the show Poligraf in 1998.Since 2000, Stanković has been an editor and host of Nedjeljom u dva on Croatian Radiotelevision. He has interviewed many Croatian and regional politicians like Ivo Sanader, Milan Bandić, Andrej Plenković, Milorad Dodik, Boris Tadić, Zdravko Mamić, and others. In 2024, Stanković announced that the show will no longer be exclusive to political discussions and will welcome guests from all walks of life.

He appeared in cameo roles in the series Bitange i princeze and Dobre namjere, playing as the "famous bald man". He is the author of the documentary films Moje želje moji snovi (2004) and Tata ide u pan (2005), as well as the travel series Vjetar u kosi (2014, 2015, 2016).

== Filmography ==
=== Television roles ===
- Bitange i princeze (2005)
- Dobre namjere
- Moje želje moji snovi (2004)
- Tata ide u Pan (2005)
- Vjetar u kosi 1 (2014)
- Vjetar u kosi 2 (2015)
- Vjetar u kosi 3 (2016)
- Kokice (2019)

=== Host ===
- Poligraf (1998)
- Nedjeljom u dva (2000-present)

== Bibliography ==
- Jutra pobijeđenih (2001)
- Igor Mandić na mjesecu (2010)
- Uglavnom su me voljele starije gospođe (2012)
- Sto faca i Aca (2013)
- Depra (2023)
- F32 (2025)

== Awards ==
He is the winner of the 1999 HRT annual award for the show Poligraf, the HND awards "Marija Jurić Zagorka" for the best talk show in 2000, and 2009 Journalist of the Year.
