= The Pyramid (TV series) =

Television series

- Genre: Talk show
- Created by: Željka Ogresta and Dubravko Merlić
- Country of origin: Croatia

Production
- Running time: 60 minutes
- Production companies: HRT and Castor Multimedia

Original release
- Release: 31 October 2004 – 2008

The Pyramid (Croatian: Piramida) is a weekly Croatian television series, co-produced by Croatian Radiotelevision (HRT) and Castor Multimedia. Essentially a talk show, it also has a competitive element. In each 60 minute episode, three prominent public figures from different walks of life give their views and debate on five issues arising from the top news stories of the previous week. The program is broadcast live before a studio audience, with the viewers at home voting by telephone for the winning speaker. The results of the tele-voting are displayed throughout the show, and one caller is randomly selected each week to receive a cash prize.

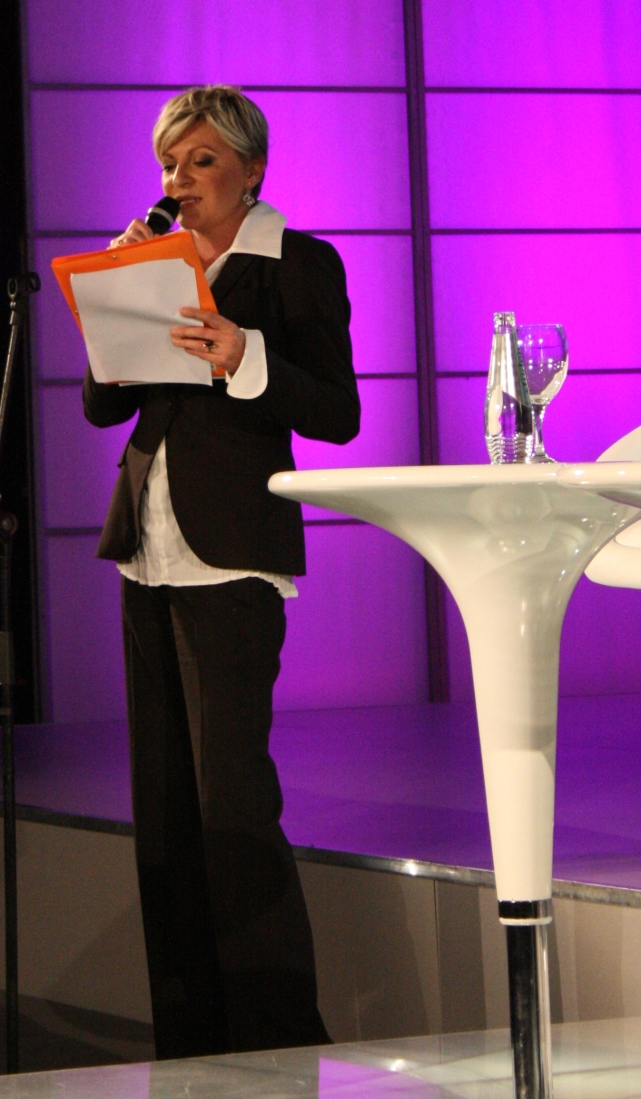
Željka Ogresta, presenter of The Pyramid

== History ==
The show is written and presented by the well-known Croatian television personality, Željka Ogresta, whose husband, Dubravko Merlić (head of Castor Multimedia) conceived the format. The first episode was broadcast on 31 October 2004 with opera singer Sandra Bagarić, sociologist Aleksandar Štulhofer and politician Dragan Primorac announced as the contestants. According to HRT's statistics the first season averaged 61,539 callers per episode. The Pyramid won a 2007 Rose d'Or award for Best Live Show, and has inspired several localized versions in the region including those in Serbia (started in 2005), Bosnia and Herzegovina (started in 2007), Bulgaria (started in 2007), Macedonia (started in 2007), and Montenegro (started in 2007). The Slovenian version, which started in 2006, is presented by Erika Žnidaršič and broadcast on RTV Slovenija. There was also a Canadian version, La joute (The Joust), presented by Stéphan Bureau and broadcast by Télé-Québec. La joute ran for two seasons but was discontinued after the 2009/2010 season when the ratings had dropped 40% from the previous season.

== Format ==
Each season consists of three cycles, organized like a quiz show, with so called "levels". In each cycle, the winning speakers from each of the first 9 rounds move to the second level of the pyramid. Those winners then compete at the third and top level which determines the champion of that cycle. The champions of each of the three cycles then compete in the 40th and final episode of the season, the "Super Pyramid".

The debates in each episode are tightly structured. Each of the news issues is introduced by a thirty-second video followed by a nine-minute discussion. One guest starts the discussion and has one minute to introduce the debate, with no one allowed to interrupt. Then each of the remaining two guests gives their one-minute take on the issue. After the first speaker, each guest also has one "right of rebuttal", allowing them to interrupt the current speaker with an interjection lasting at most 30 seconds. When a speaker is interrupted, they have a further 60 seconds to respond. Once each speaker has been able to speak for 60 seconds without interruption, the discussion continues with the presenter asking questions of the three guests. The first speaker in the first three issues under debate is chosen by the order in which they signed for the show. The first speaker in the fourth debate is the one currently placed second in the tele-voting, while the first speaker in the fifth debate is the one currently placed last.

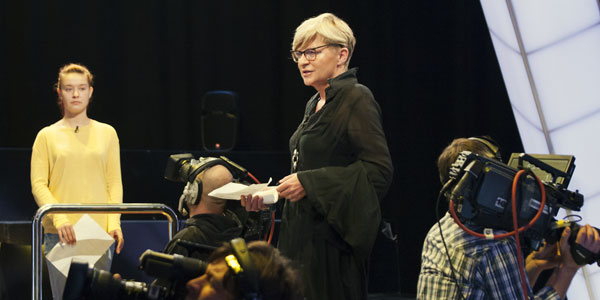
Željka Ogresta at the rehearsal

== Re-launching ==
After several years of intermission The Pyramid was re-launched on 16 September 2014.

Guests of the first episode in the new season were: Slavko Linić, former Minister of finance, Ivica Vrkić, mayor of Osijek and Anica Kovač, former model and the first runner-up in the Miss World 1995. Slavko Linić become a winner of the first episode after 58% of the voters voted for him. Ivica Vrkić won 19% while Anica Kovač won 23% of the votes.

Guests of the second episode in the new season were: Jadranka Kosor, former Prime Minister of Croatia, Branko Vukšić, former member of the Labour Party and the MP and Dražen Turina Šajeta, pop singer. Jadranka Kosor become a winner of the second episode after 51% of the voters voted for her. Branko Vukšić won 17% while Dražen Turina Šajeta von 32% of the votes.

== Winners ==
- 1. season : Milan Bandić, Mayor of Zagreb
- 2. season : Damir Kajin, MP
- 3. season : Marijana Petir, MEP since 2014.
- 4. season : Nikica Gabrić, M.D. and president of the National Forum party
- 5. season : (In progress)

== Original production team ==
- Writer/Presenter: Željka Ogresta
- Co-writer: Željko Matić
- Director: Danko Volarić
- Set design: Dragutin Broz
- Lighting design: Ana Matičević
- Graphic design: Nedjeljko Špoljar, Sensus Design Factory
- Music: Tomislav Modrić
