= Knjazalište =

- The title card for the series
- Genre: Reality series; Documentary
- Created by: Robert Knjaz
- Country of origin: Croatia
- Original language: Croatian
- No. of seasons: 1
- No. of episodes: 10

Production
- Running time: 50 minutes

Original release
- Network: HRT 1
- Release: 2 October – 4 December 2023

Knjazalište is a Croatian television series created and hosted by Robert Knjaz. The series documents celebrities who are put in unusual situations as they perform a certain job or try out a lifestyle that they are normally unfamiliar with. The series ran on HRT 1 from 2 October to 4 December 2023.

The title of the series, Knjazalište, is a portmanteau of "Knjaz" and "kazalište," the latter meaning "theatre" in Croatian.

== Format ==
In the focus of each episode is a celebrity to whom Knjaz assigns an unusual role. These include jobs such as working at a marketplace or as a construction worker or experiencing life as a deaf person or as a person of the opposite gender.

== Episodes ==
No.	Title	Original release date
1	"Ćorluka i Franka kao Romi"	2 October 2023
2	"Barbara Kolar i Duško Ćurlić kao kumice na placu"	9 October 2023
3	"Stjepan Hauser kao gluha osoba"	16 October 2023
4	"Ella Dvornik kao bauštela"	23 October 2023
5	"Marko Grubnić kao sakupljač boca"	30 October 2023
6	"Dino Jelusić kao starac"	6 November 2023
7	"Lovci iz Potjere kao krapinski praljudi"	13 November 2023
8	"Petar Grašo kao pic majstor"	20 November 2023
9	"Enis Bešlagić kao žena, majka, kraljica"	27 November 2023
10	"Best of"	4 December 2023
