= Odašiljači i veze =

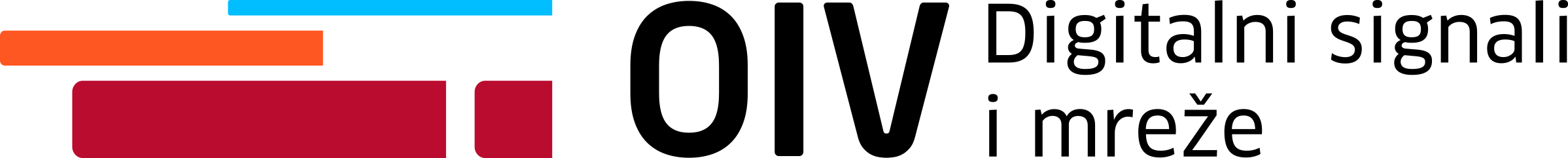
- Company type: Public
- Industry: Telecommunications
- Founded: 29 March 1924
- Founder: Oton Kučera
- Headquarters: Ulica grada Vukovara 269/d, Zagreb, Croatia
- Area served: Croatia
- Key people: Denis Nikola Kulišić (CEO)
- Owner: Republic of Croatia
- Number of employees: 304 (2017)
- Website: www.oiv.hr

Odašiljači i veze d.o.o. (OiV) is a Croatian limited liability company, terrestrial television and WiMAX operator born from the separation from Hrvatska Radiotelevizija in 2001.

Croatia started to test DVB-T transmission on June 13, 2002. The systems transmitted 4 national TV channels at that time (HRT 1, HRT 2, HRT 3 and Nova TV). Odašiljači i veze built a network of 9 transmitters, completed in 2007 and covering about 70% of the country. Analogue broadcasting stopped in October 2010.

Currently, as of December 2013, it transmits 11 national channels (HRT 1, HRT 2, HRT 3, HRT 4, RTL Televizija, RTL 2, RTL Kockica, Nova TV, Doma TV, SPTV and CMC), as well as regional services.
