= Željka Ogresta =

Croatian journalist and television presenter

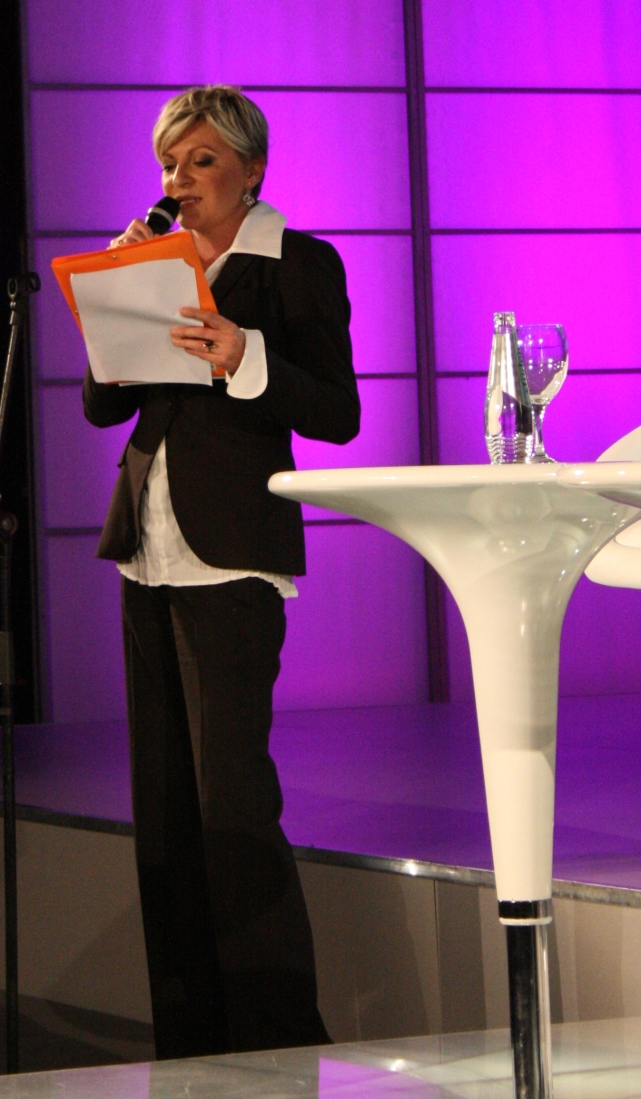
- Ogresta in October 2008
- Born: 28 June 1963 (age 63); Zagreb, SR Croatia, Yugoslavia
- Occupations: Journalist; television presenter
- Spouse: Dubravko Merlić
- Relatives: Zrinko (brother)

Željka Ogresta (born 28 June 1963) is a Croatian journalist and television presenter. She is married to Dubravko Merlić, with whom she has three children.
