= HRT 3 =

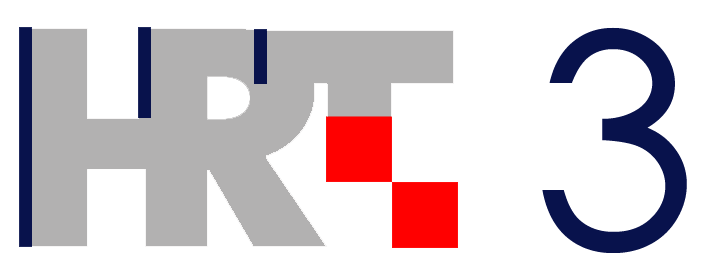
- Country: Croatia
- Broadcast area: Croatia
- Network: Hrvatska radiotelevizija
- Headquarters: Zagreb

Programming
- Language: Croatian
- Picture format: 1080p HDTV

Ownership
- Owner: Croatian Government
- Sister channels: HRT 1; HRT 2; HRT 4; HRT International

History
- Launched: 1 March 1991; 13 September 2012
- Closed: 28 March 2004
- Replaced by: HRT Plus (2004–2012)
- Former names: Z3 (1989–1990); HTV Z3 (1990–1991)

Links
- Website: hrt.hr

Availability

Terrestrial
- OiV: MUX M1

Streaming media
- HRTi: Watch live

HRT 3 (HTV 3, "Treći program") is a Croatian free-to-air television channel from Hrvatska Radiotelevizija, that was launched on 13 September 2012.

== History ==
HRT 3's original history began in 1989, when this channel was originally known as Z3 and later HTV Z3. It officially came on air on 1 March 1991, but was taken off air on 16 September 1991, when its main transmitter, the Sljeme TV tower, was damaged in an air raid. On 7 November 1994, the channel came back on air, this time as HRT 3. The channel was shut down on 28 March 2004, but this time with its frequency de-nationalized and out up for lease in a public tender (it has been used by RTL Televizija ever since). It was replaced by satellite channel HRT Plus until its relaunch in 2012.

HRT started considering the return of HRT 3 in November 2005, replacing HRT Plus but maintaining its sports and entertainment formula. In July 2007, it announced plans for two new channels aiming for digital terrestrial television, HRT 3 and HRT News. Later plans suggested HRT 3 becoming exclusively a sports channel. In August 2008, a planned relaunch of HRT 3 as HRT 3 Sport for 1 January 2009 was announced, with a planned partnership with the Croatian Olympic Committee, airing less popular sports, such as volleyball and women's handball. The sports channel plan was faced with opposition from RTL Televizija and Nova TV, who jointly blocked HRT's plans for a sports channel, under the grounds that it would harm the development of the Croatian television market.

In November 2010, it was announced that HRT 3 and HRT 4 would begin their operations after 1 January 2011, due to changes in the Croatian legislation after the shutdown of analog terrestrial signals.

On 10 February 2012, HRT 3 was officially announced thanks to a preliminary agreement between HRT and seven national institutions and associations related to educational, cultural, scientific and cultural affairs. It was speculated that the channel would broadcast films and entertainment content. The channel was finally relaunched for the second time on 13 September 2012, but with a new emphasis on educational and documentary material, as well as showing classic films and series, with occasional art and independent films. The channel is broadcast in MUX B on Croatian territory, via satellite Eutelsat 16A at frequency 10,721 GHz H 27,500th.

From 7 to 12 December 2020, the channel aired Polish movies as part of a protocol signed with Telewizja Polska and the Polish embassy in Zagreb.
