= HRT 4 =

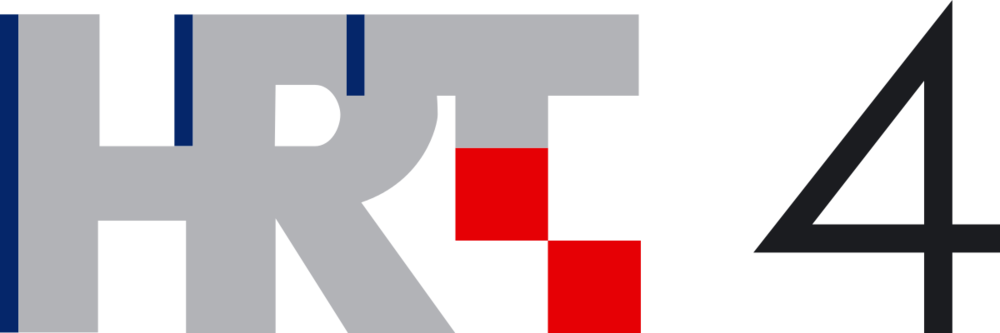
- Country: Croatia
- Broadcast area: Croatia
- Network: Hrvatska radiotelevizija
- Headquarters: Zagreb

Programming
- Language: Croatian
- Picture format: 1080p HDTV

Ownership
- Owner: Croatian Government
- Sister channels: HRT 1; HRT 2; HRT 3; HRT International

History
- Launched: 24 December 2012; 13 years ago

Links
- Website: hrt.hr

Availability

Terrestrial
- OiV: MUX M1

Streaming media
- HRTi: Watch live

HRT 4 (HTV 4, "Četvrti program") is a Croatian free-to-air television channel from Hrvatska Radiotelevizija, which was launched on 24 December 2012. Its programming is centred towards newscasts.

== History ==
HRT started planning a news channel in 2007 under the tentative name HRT News/HTV News, with a tentative 1 January 2008 launch date. The name HRT 4 was also considered, but no official decision was taken. In May 2008, HRT announced the creation of up to seven new channels by 2013. The plan envisioned the HRT Plus replacement HRT 3, news channel HRT 4 (the name was not official yet), a music channel, a documentary channel and a children's channel. The aim of the sports and news channels was to increase the number of people who paid television licenses, which at the time, had a shadow market of 200,000 to 300,000 households who didn't pay them.

In November 2010, it was announced that HRT 3 and HRT 4 would begin their operations after 1 January 2011, due to changes in the Croatian legislation after the shutdown of analog terrestrial signals. There was the possibility of HRT 4 becoming an educational and entertainment channel, instead of the news channel format that was proposed since 2008, as well as airing live sessions of the Croatian Parliament.

The channel was officially announced on 17 November with a tentative mid-December launch date. On 21 December, test broadcasts began on satellite, while regular broadcasts commenced on 24 December. From 20 May 2013, the channel started free-to-air satellite broadcasts. In September 2015, HRT 4 began encrypting certain programs (foreign content) that can only be shown legally within Croatia due to licensing restrictions. The channel began employing the Viaccess system for part of the schedule, the same system which is used to encrypt programming on other HRT channels for the same reason.

== Programming ==
- Dnevnik HRT
- Regionalni dnevnik
- Live session transmissions of Croatian Parliament
- News
- No comment
- Alpe Adria Danube
- DW
- Minority mosaic
- News in English
- News in Spanish
- DJH-reports
- Documentary Reportage

== Logo ==
Years	Description	Image
24 December 2012 – 17 September 2014	Stylized colour "4" in watermark.	
18 September 2014–present day	Present logo of HRT 4, with a better resolution version.	
