= HRT 2 =

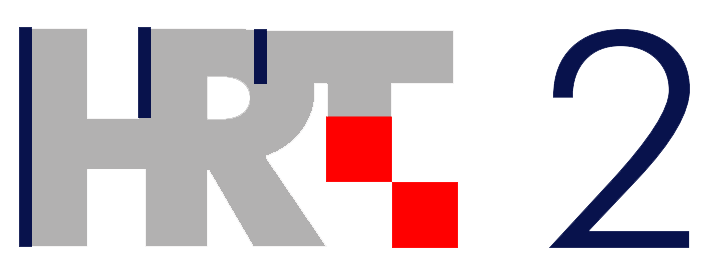
- Country: Croatia
- Broadcast area: Croatia
- Network: Hrvatska radiotelevizija
- Headquarters: Zagreb

Programming
- Language: Croatian
- Picture format: 1080p HDTV

Ownership
- Owner: Croatian Government
- Sister channels: HRT 1; HRT 3; HRT 4; HRT International

History
- Launched: 27 August 1972; 53 years ago
- Former names: Radiotelevizija Zagreb (RTZ), part of Jugoslavenska radiotelevizija (JRT) (1956–1990)

Links
- Website: hrt.hr

Availability

Terrestrial
- OiV: MUX M1

Streaming media
- HRTi: Watch live

HRT 2 (HTV 2, "Drugi program") is a Croatian free-to-air public broadcast television channel owned and operated by Hrvatska Radiotelevizija (HRT). Its line-up focuses mainly on entertainment, although it also broadcasts news and documentaries. The channel started 24-hour broadcasts on 14 January 2011.

A new broadcast of HRT 2, HRT 2 No Latency was launched on 20 November 2022, available only on the HRTi streaming service, following the opening of the 2022 FIFA World Cup. The channel was closed down at the end of the World Cup. HRT 2 Low Latency aired the same programs as HRT 2, without the ability to pause and rewind.

== Local programming ==
When it comes to local programming, HRT 2 mostly airs re-runs of television programs previously broadcast by HRT 1. The channel does, however, offer a number of small-scale production television series, such as those oriented at entertainment and lifestyle.

HRT 2 original programming (current)
Title	Genre	Description
Auto Market Magazin	Magazine	Offers the latest news from the world of cars, traffic safety and vehicle tests.
Hit dana	Music	Broadcast daily at 19:45, the 5-minute program plays the song from the top of the charts
Samo lagano	Magazine	Hosted by Mirna Dvoršćak, the series brings inrpirational stories.
Svijet zabave	Magazine	Hosted by Dorijan Klarić, the series brings the viewers into the current world of music, films, fashion, and celebrities.

== Acquired programming ==
Unlike HRT 1 which puts a greater focus on local programming, HRT 2 offers a larger chunk of television series acquired from foreign television networks. These are largery British television series, often acquired from BBC.

=== Current programming ===
Currently, the channel airs a vast array of non-scripted documentary and lifestyle television series in the morning and during the day. The channel also features a programming block titled Krimi petak (English: Crime Friday), which features acquired crime television series airing every Friday in the prime time.

- Amazing Animal Families – Obitelji čudesnih životinja
- Amazing Railway Adventures with Nick Knowles – Sjajne željezničke pustolovine s Nickom Knowlesom
- The World's Most Extraordinary Homes – Najčudesniji domovi na svijetu
- Rick Stein's Food Stories – Rick Stein: Priče o hrani
- Garden Rescue – Spašavatelji vrtova
- My Life on a Plate – Moj život na tanjuru
- Escape to the Country – Bijeg u unutrašnjost
- The Graham Norton Show – Graham Norton i gosti
- Murder in Provence – Ubojstva u Provansi
- Vera
- Modus
- New Tricks – Novi stari slučajevi
- Father Brown – Velečasni Brown
- DCI Banks – Viši inspektor Banks

=== Former programming ===
- Star Trek: The Original Series – Croatian: Zvjezdane staze
- Star Trek: The Next Generation – Zvjezdane staze: Slijedeća generacija
- Star Trek: Deep Space Nine – Zvjezdane staze: Deep Space Nine
- Star Trek: Voyager – Zvjezdane staze: Voyager
- Star Trek: Enterprise – Zvjezdane staze: Enterprise
- Battlestar Galactica – Galactica
- Stargate: Universe – Zvjezdana vrata: Svemir
- Doctor Who
- House M.D. – Dr House
- My Name Is Earl – Zovem se Earl
- Ugly Betty – Ružna Betty
- CSI: Crime Scene Investigation
- 24
- Ally McBeal
- Friends – Prijatelji
- One Tree Hill – Tree Hill
- Lie to Me – Laži mi
- The Suite Life of Zack & Cody – Lagodan život Zacka i Codyja
- Dear John – Dragi John
- Pastewka - Pastewka
- Sex And The City – Seks i grad
- The X-Files – Dosjei X
- Rome – Stari Rim
- The Simpsons – Simpsoni (Note: Later moved to HRT 3.)
- Tiny Toon Adventures – Zekoslavci
- Sunset Beach
- Celebridade – Svijet slavnih
- Coupling – Parovi
- La Fuerza del Destino – Moć sudbine
- Amor Bravío – Prkosna ljubav

== Sports ==
HRT 2 broadcast various live sports events. The 2024 Summer Olympics were broadcast by the channel in UHD.

- UEFA Europa League
- UEFA Europa Conference League
- FIFA World Cup

== Logo history ==
Years	Description
1972–June 1990	Yellow RTZ with small captions.
June 1990–January 1994	Thick yellow "2" with the letters HTV underneath.
January 1994–March 1995	The letters HRT with white font and shadow.
March 1995–October 1997	Thick-font letters HRT.
October 1997–4 October 2000	Stylized blue and grey "2" in square.
5 October 2000–present day	Present logo of HRT 2, with a higher resolution version added in August 2008.
