= HRT 1 =

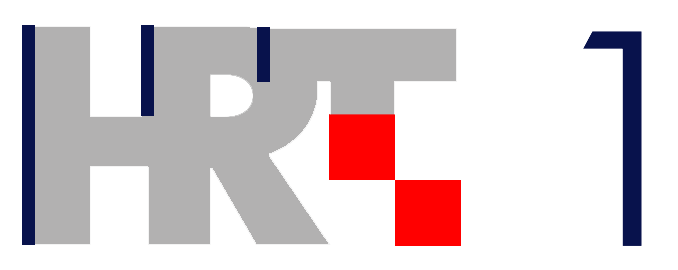
- Country: Croatia
- Broadcast area: Croatia
- Network: Hrvatska Radiotelevizija
- Headquarters: Zagreb

Programming
- Language: Croatian
- Picture format: 1080p HDTV

Ownership
- Owner: Croatian Government
- Sister channels: HRT 2; HRT 3; HRT 4; HRT International

History
- Launched: 15 May 1956; 70 years ago
- Former names: Televizija Zagreb or TV Zagreb (TVZ), part of Jugoslavenska radiotelevizija (JRT) (1956–1991)

Links
- Website: hrt.hr

Availability

Terrestrial
- OiV: MUX M1

Streaming media
- HRTi: Watch live

HRT 1 (HTV 1, "Prvi program") is a Croatian television channel, operated by public broadcaster Hrvatska Radiotelevizija (HRT). It is a generalist channel, whose diverse programming lineup includes news programming and other informative series throughout the different parts of the day, as well as a vast array of scripted and non-scripted original and acquired television series.

== Original programming ==
As HRT's flagship channel, HRT 1 airs most of the network's original programming, which consist of news programs and scripted and non-scripted televisions series that are of wide public interest. In collaboration with various Croatian production companies, HRT has broadcast numerous original television series. Aside from talk shows and documentary series of original format, the channel's lineup also features game show and competition series which are mostly Croatian adaptations of foreign formats, such as The Voice and Who Wants to Be a Millionaire?. On the other hand, small-scale production original series, such as children's programming and talks shows of specific interest, usually air on HRT 2 and HRT 3.

=== Current programming ===
==== News ====
The channel airs HRT's central news programme, Dnevnik HRT, several times a day. The central one-hour long news broadcasts airs daily at 19:00, with other shorter news broadcasts airing during morning and at around 12:00, 16:30 and after 22:00.

==== Dobro jutro, Hrvatska ====
The channel's morning television series, Dobro jutro, Hrvatska (English: Good Morning, Croatia), airs during weekdays from 6:00 to around 10:00, and on Saturdays between 9:00 and 11:00. Filmed in a studio with various hosts, it is a variety talk show series that deals with relevant news of the day and features interviews with various guests. It is one of HRT's longest-running series, having been on air since 27 April 1992.

==== Scripted series ====
| Title | Genre | Premiere | Seasons | Status |
|---|---|---|---|---|
| Bijeli put | Drama | 30 September 2024 | 1 | Pending |
| Dnevnik velikog Perice | Comedy | 8 March 2021 | 2 | Pending |
| Metropolitanci | Drama | 26 September 2022 | 2 | Season 2 ongoing |
| Mrkomir Prvi | Comedy | 31 December 2020 | 4 | Pending |
| Oblak u službi zakona | Comedy | 9 January 2023 | 3 | Season 3 ongoing |
| Sram | Teen drama | 27 October 2024 | 2 | S2 ongoing |

==== Reality and game show series ====
| Title | Premiere | Seasons | Status | Notes |
|---|---|---|---|---|
| Godina za pamćenje | 31 December 2023 | 2 | Season 2 ongoing | – |
| Ples sa zvijezdama | 2 December 2006 | 11 (Note: Seasons 9–11 of Ples sa zvijezdama aired on Nova TV.) | Renewed | Based on Strictly Come Dancing |
| Potjera | 27 October 2013 | 12 | Season 12 ongoing | Based on The Chase |
| Superpotjera | 26 March 2023 | 2 | Season 2 ongoing | Based on Beat the Chasers |
| Tko želi biti milijunaš? | 24 March 2002 | 14 | Season 14 ongoing | Based on Who Wants to Be a Millionaire? |
| The Voice Hrvatska | 17 January 2015 | 4 | Renewed | Based on The Voice |
| The Voice Kids Hrvatska | 28 December 2024 | 1 | Season 1 ongoing | Based on The Voice Kids |
| Volim Hrvatsku | 23 September 2012 | 11 | Pending | Based on I Love My Country |
| Zvijezde pjevaju | 7 April 2007 | 13 | Pending | Based on Just the Two of Us |

==== Documentary and lifestyle series ====
| Title | Premiere | Seasons | Status |
|---|---|---|---|
| Dulum zemlje | 9 May 2021 | 3 | Season 3 ongoing |
| Najljepša europska sela | 1 October 2024 | 1 | Pending |
| Slatka kuharica | | 3 | Season 3 ongoing |
| Sretni gradovi | 4 October 2023 | 2 | Season 2 ongoing |

==== Talk shows ====
| Title | Premiere | Seasons | Status |
|---|---|---|---|
| Kod nas doma | 18 September 2017 | 8 | Season 8 ongoing |
| Nedjeljom u dva | 8 October 2000 | | Ongoing |
| Otvoreno | 2004 | | Ongoing |
| U svom filmu | 19 September 2017 | 7 | Pending |

==== Other programming ====
Since HRT is the Croatian participating broadcaster at the Eurovision Song Contest, the network organizes and produces Dora, the Croatian national final for Eurovision, which has been broadcast on HRT 1 annually, first from 1993 to 2011, and then once again since 2019 onwards. The channel also occasionally airs live broadcasts of various events that are relevant in Croatia. Other programming includes one-off specials, such as New Year's specials.

=== Former programming ===
The following is a list of notable former original programming that was broadcast on HRT 1.

==== Scripted series ====
- Naši i vaši (2000–2002, comedy)
- Villa Maria (2004–2005, telenovela)
- Bitange i princeze (2005–2010, comedy)
- Luda kuća (2005–2010)
- Ljubav u zaleđu (2005–2006, telenovela)
- Obični ljudi (2006–2007, telenovela)
- Ponos Ratkajevih (2007–2008, period drama)
- Sve će biti dobro (2008–2009, telenovela)
- Stipe u gostima (2008–2014, comedy)
- Dolina sunca (2009–2010, telenovela)
- Odmori se, zaslužio si (2006–2014, comedy)
- Dome, slatki dome (2010, comedy)
- Provodi i sprovodi (2011–2012, comedy)
- Crno-bijeli svijet (2015–2021, dramedy)
- Nemoj nikome reći (2015–2017, teen comedy)

==== Non-scripted series ====
- Kolo sreće, Croatian adaptation of Wheel of Fortune
- Motrišta
- Odjeci dana
- Izazov!, Croatian adaptation of Jeopardy!
- Art Attack, children's art show
- Najslabija karika, Croatian adaptation of The Weakest Link
- 1 protiv 100, Croatian adaptation of 1 vs 100
- Dossier.Hr, news/politics magazine
- Latinica, political talk show
- Res Publica, educational talk show
- Lica nacije, political late night talk show
- Hrvatski kraljevi, a documentary about Croatian kings and dukes
- Ples sa zvijezdama, Croatian adaptation of Strictly Come Dancing
- U istom loncu, cooking show
- Friday night, variety show
- Knjazalište
- Pobjednici

== Acquired programming ==
The channel currently broadcasts various non-Croatian foreign programming, such as documentary series acquired from the BBC or Spanish or Brazilian-language telenovelas.

=== Current programming ===
==== Scripted series ====
- La Promesa
- Perdona nuestros pecados – Obiteljski grijesi
- The Pinkertons – Pinkertoni
- Vuelve a mí – Zauvijek zajedno

==== Non-scripted series ====
- Giovanna Fletcher: Made in Italy
- Lidia's Kitchen – Lidijina kuhinja
- Planet Earth III
- Shakespeare, Rise of a Genius

== Logo history ==
| Years | Description |
|---|---|
| 1956–1970 | Stylized white circles in square making "RTZ" . |
| 1972–June 1990 | Yellow RTZ with small captions. |
| June 1990–January 1994 | HTV with white font, and shadow |
| January 1994–March 1995 | HRT with white font, and shadow. |
| March 1995–October 1997 | Thick, main logo of HRT. |
| October 1997–4 October 2000 | Stylized red/grey "1" in square. |
| 5 October 2000–present day | Present logo of HRT 1; a added new, higher resolution version was released in August 2008. |

== See also ==
- Hrvatska Radiotelevizija
