= Croatian Radiotelevision =

Croatian public broadcasting company

Coordinates: 45°47′35″N 15°58′29″E

Hrvatska radiotelevizija
- Official logo

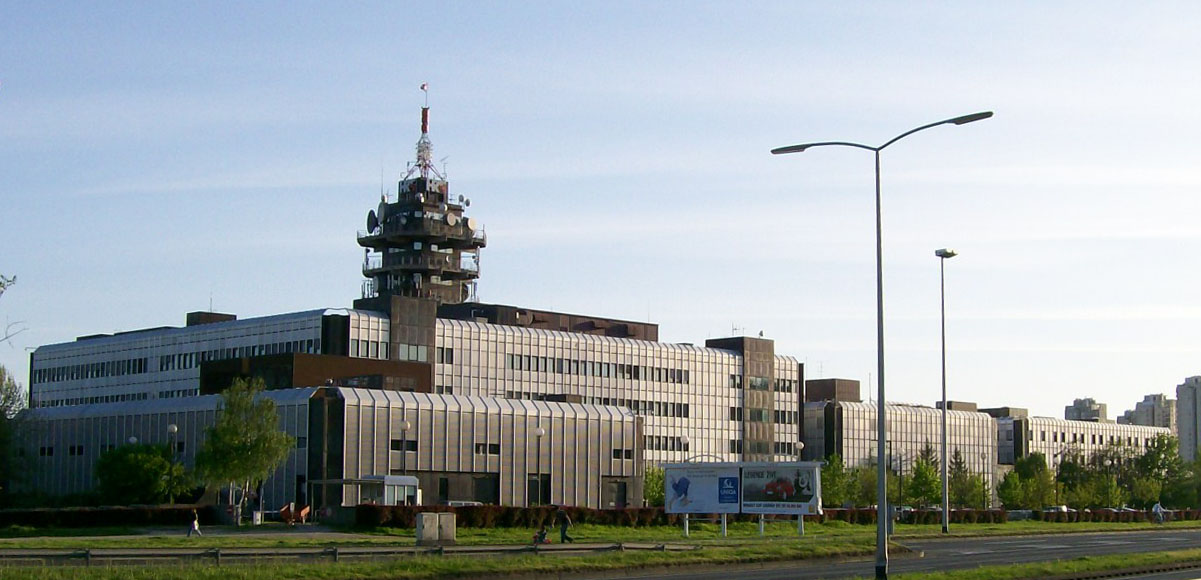
- HRT's headquarters in Prisavlje, Zagreb in 2008
- Type: Terrestrial radio, state media, propaganda and online
- Country: Croatia
- Availability: National; International (via HRT International and hrt.hr)
- Founded: 15 May 1926; 100 years ago
- TV stations: HRT 1; HRT 2; HRT 3; HRT 4; HRT International
- Radio stations: HR1; HR2; HR3; Regional stations; Voice of Croatia
- Revenue: ▲€192.89 million (2024)
- Headquarters: Prisavlje 3, 10000 Zagreb
- Broadcast area: Croatia
- Owner: Government of Croatia
- Key people: Robert Šveb
- Launch date: 15 May 1926; 100 years ago (Radio); 15 May 1956; 70 years ago (Television)
- Former names: Radio Televizija Zagreb (1956–1990)
- Affiliation: European Broadcasting Union
- Former affiliations: Yugoslav Radio Television
- Official website: www.hrt.hr
- Language: Croatian

Hrvatska radiotelevizija (abbr. HRT), or Croatian Radiotelevision, is a Croatian public broadcasting company and news website. It operates several radio and television channels, over a domestic transmitter network as well as satellite. HRT is divided into three joint companies – Croatian Radio (Hrvatski radio), Croatian Television (Hrvatska televizija) and Music Production (Glazbena proizvodnja), which includes three orchestras (Symphony, Jazz, and Tamburitza) and a choir.

The founder of HRT is the Republic of Croatia which exercises its founder's rights through the Croatian Government. Croatian Radio (then Radio Zagreb) was founded on 15 May 1926. This date is considered the date on which HRT was founded and is observed as the "HRT's Day" (Dan HRT-a). Television Zagreb (today Croatian Television) began broadcasting on 7 September 1956. By the law enacted by the Croatian Parliament on 29 June 1990, Radio Television Zagreb was renamed Croatian Radiotelevision.

HRT operates as a provider of public broadcasting services, and Croatia provides funding by the Croatian Radiotelevision Law and the State Aid Rules for Public Broadcasting Services.

On 25 May 2012, HRT's archive of the television and radio program and its collection of musical production was given the status of Croatian cultural heritage.

== History ==
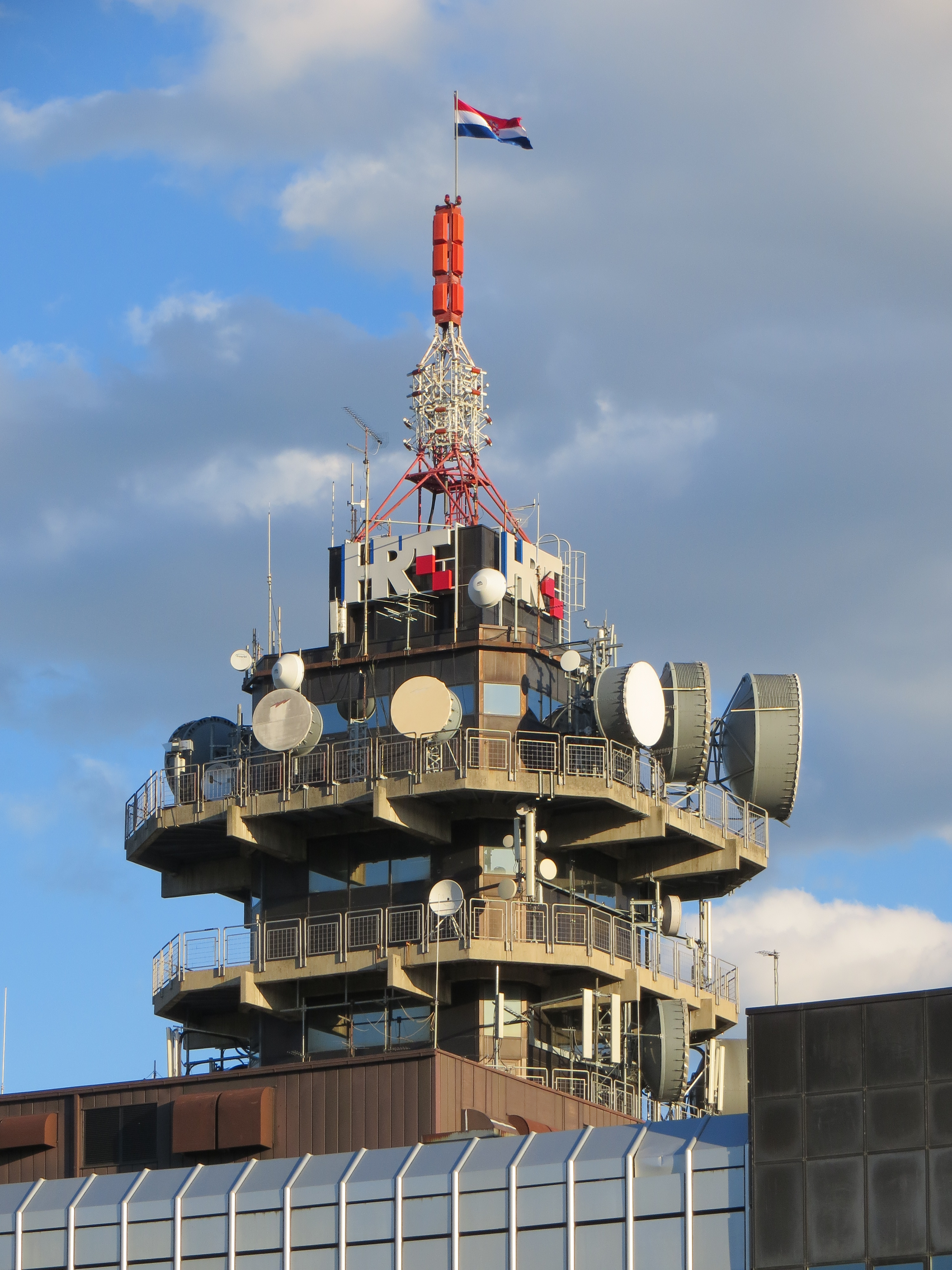
The tower of the Broadcasting Center in Prisavlje in 2013

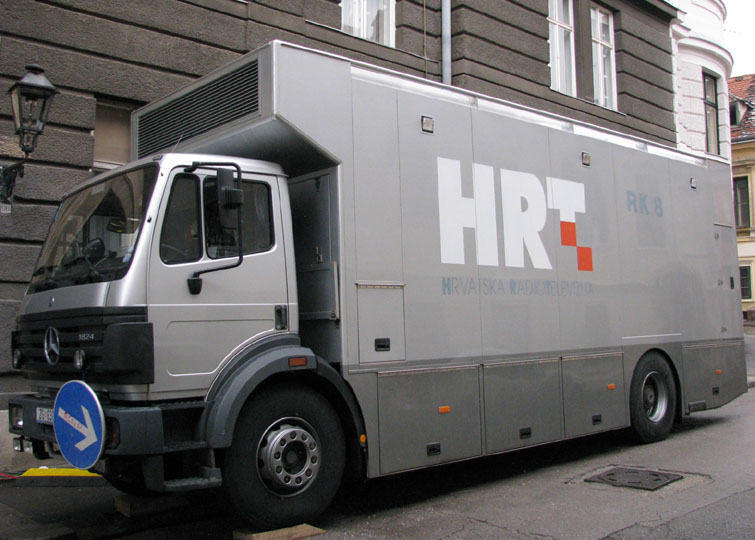
An outside broadcast truck owned by HRT

Croatian Radiotelevision is the direct successor of Radio Station Zagreb (Radio stanica Zagreb) that started broadcasting on 15 May 1926, the second radio station to broadcast in Southeast Europe. The station was initially a private company, before Radio Zagreb was nationalized on 1 May 1940. During the Independent State of Croatia, the station was known as Hrvatski krugoval. After World War II, it began to operate as a state-owned radio station.

At the end of the first year of operation, Radio Zagreb company had a little over four thousand subscribers.

On the 30th anniversary of the establishment of Zagreb Radio Station, on 15 May 1956, the first television programme was broadcast from the transmitter built at Sljeme. Television Zagreb's first live broadcast aired on 7 September 1956, making Croatia the first Yugoslav republic to have television. For the next two years this was the only television broadcasting service in the southeast European area. Colour television broadcasts began in 1972. In 1970s, Radio Zagreb Correspondence Center and to a lesser extent Zagreb TV were the main coordinators of cooperation with other units of the Yugoslav Radio Television in production of media content for numerous Yugoslav citizens abroad. The program was aired by Radio Cologne, Frankfurt, Free Berlin, Zurich, Vienna, Paris, Liege, Luxembourg, Hilversum and Stockholm while the second program of the German public television aired Zagreb made "Good Morning Yugoslavia" show.

In May 1990, following Franjo Tuđman's election victory, he and his ruling Croatian Democratic Union party began a transition of radio and television stations from Yugoslav to Croatian hands. In June 1990, the Croatian Parliament renamed the company from Radio Television Zagreb (Croatian: Radiotelevizija Zagreb) to Croatian Radiotelevision (Croatian: Hrvatska radiotelevizija). The HDZ-majority Croatian Parliament soon appointed new staff at the top managerial and editorial positions on the broadcaster. The film director Antun Vrdoljak, a Tuđman appointee who was tasked with overseeing the changes, pledged to make HRT into the "cathedral of the Croatian spirit". On 16 September 1991, 300 employees at HRT were fired for "security reasons". Miljenko Jergović, writer for the Feral Tribune satirical magazine, called this dismissals "purges" of "independent-minded, respected and thus dangerous" journalists.

On 1 January 1993, HRT was admitted as a full active member of the European Broadcasting Union (EBU).

The television channels were aired under the name Croatian Television (Croatian: Hrvatska televizija) between 1990 and 1993. Since then, the current name has been used. The radio broadcast unit is referred to as Croatian Radio (Croatian: Hrvatski radio).

Following Tuđman's death and the 2000 election in Croatia which brought Stjepan Mesić to power, HRT started changing its editorial policy and staffing, aligning with more liberal views.

== Funding ==
In 2014, more than 85% of HRT's revenue came from broadcast user fees with each household in Croatia required to pay 79 HRK (~€10) per month for a single television set, with the remainder being made up from limited advertising.

== Television ==
=== Channels ===
- HRT 1 (or Prvi program): HRT's first TV channel, previously known as TVZ 1. This is a general channel with daily news around the world, documentaries, religious programmes, series and movies.
- HRT 2 (or Drugi program): HRT's second channel, previously known as TVZ 2. It is primarily used for sports broadcasts and entertainment programmes. The channel is known for its extensive footage of vintage films. It also broadcasts educational programmes.
- HRT 3 (or Treći program): HRT's third channel, primarily used for culture, films, children's shows and documentaries. It was relaunched in September 2012.
- HRT 4 (or Četvrti program): HRT's fourth channel, broadcasting news programmes, started airing in December 2012.
- HRT International, formerly HRT 5 (or Peti program): HRT's fifth and international channel, broadcasting a wide range of programmes from its domestic channels for the Croatian diasporas in Europe, North America, South America, Australia and New Zealand.

In the 1980s, there was a third channel called Z3 and later HTV Z3. It was taken off-air on 16 September 1991 when its main transmitter, the Sljeme TV tower, was damaged in an air raid. On 7 November 1994, the channel came back on the air, this time called HRT 3. The channel was later shut down with its frequency de-nationalized and put up for lease in a public tender in 2004 and it has been used by RTL Televizija ever since. It was replaced by satellite channel HRT Plus until its relaunch in 2012.

=== Regional TV channels ===
- HRT Čakovec-Varaždin (HRT regionalni centar Čakovec-Varaždin)
- HRT Osijek (HRT regionalni centar Osijek)
- HRT Rijeka-Pula (HRT regionalni centar Rijeka-Pula)
- HRT Split-Dubrovnik (HRT regionalni centar Split-Dubrovnik)
- HRT Zadar-Šibenik-Knin (HRT regionalni centar Zadar-Šibenik-Knin)

=== Streaming ===
In October 2015, HRT Launched HRTi, an over-the-top streaming service free to all registered users. HRTi offers a live stream of HRT's television and radio channels, as well as access to select catalogue of HRT's original and acquired programming.

=== Programming ===
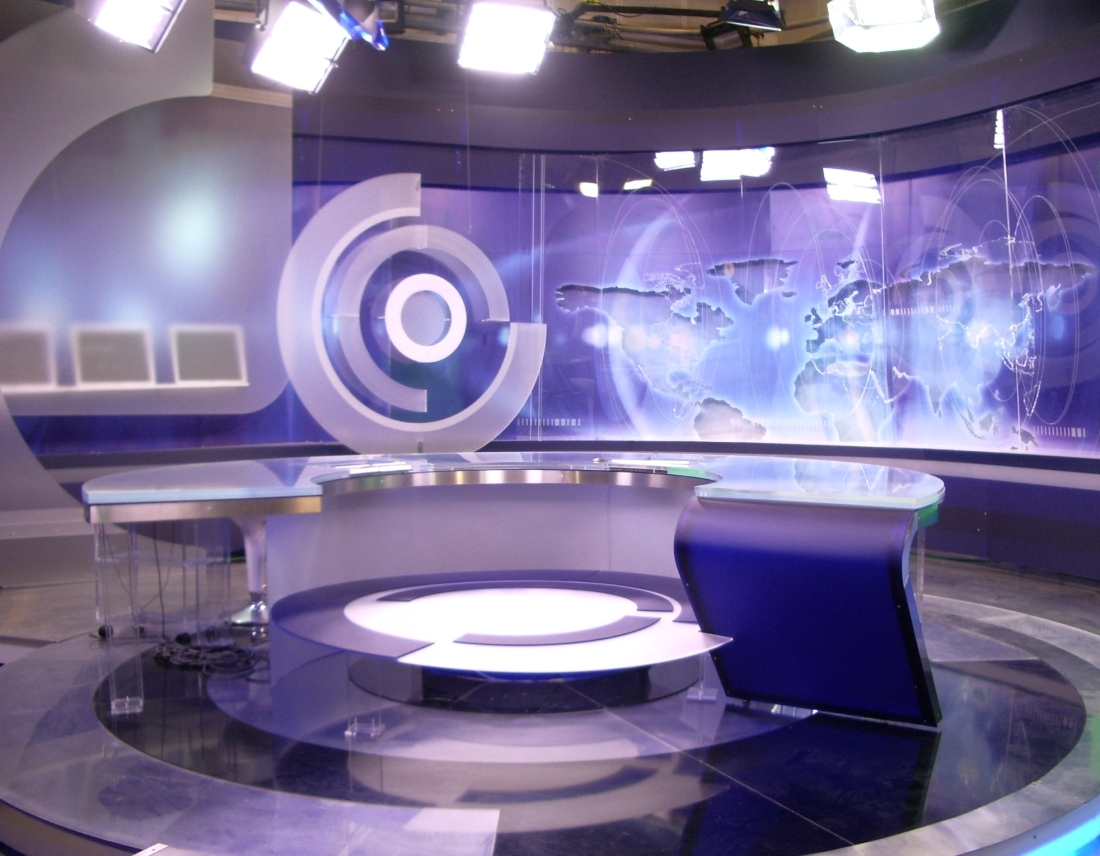
Dnevnik is one of HRT's popular news-programs

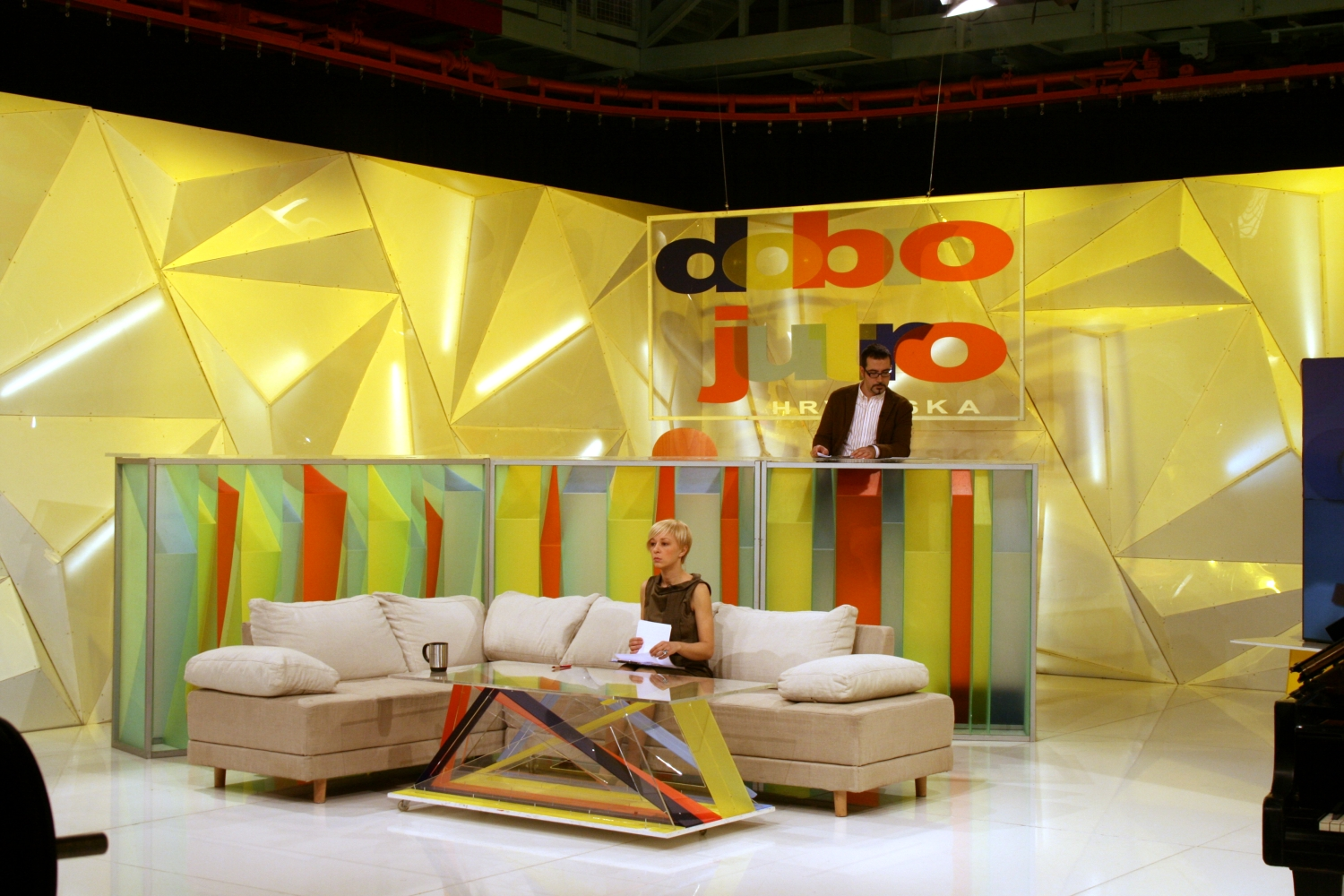
Studio of Dobro jutro, Hrvatska in 2008

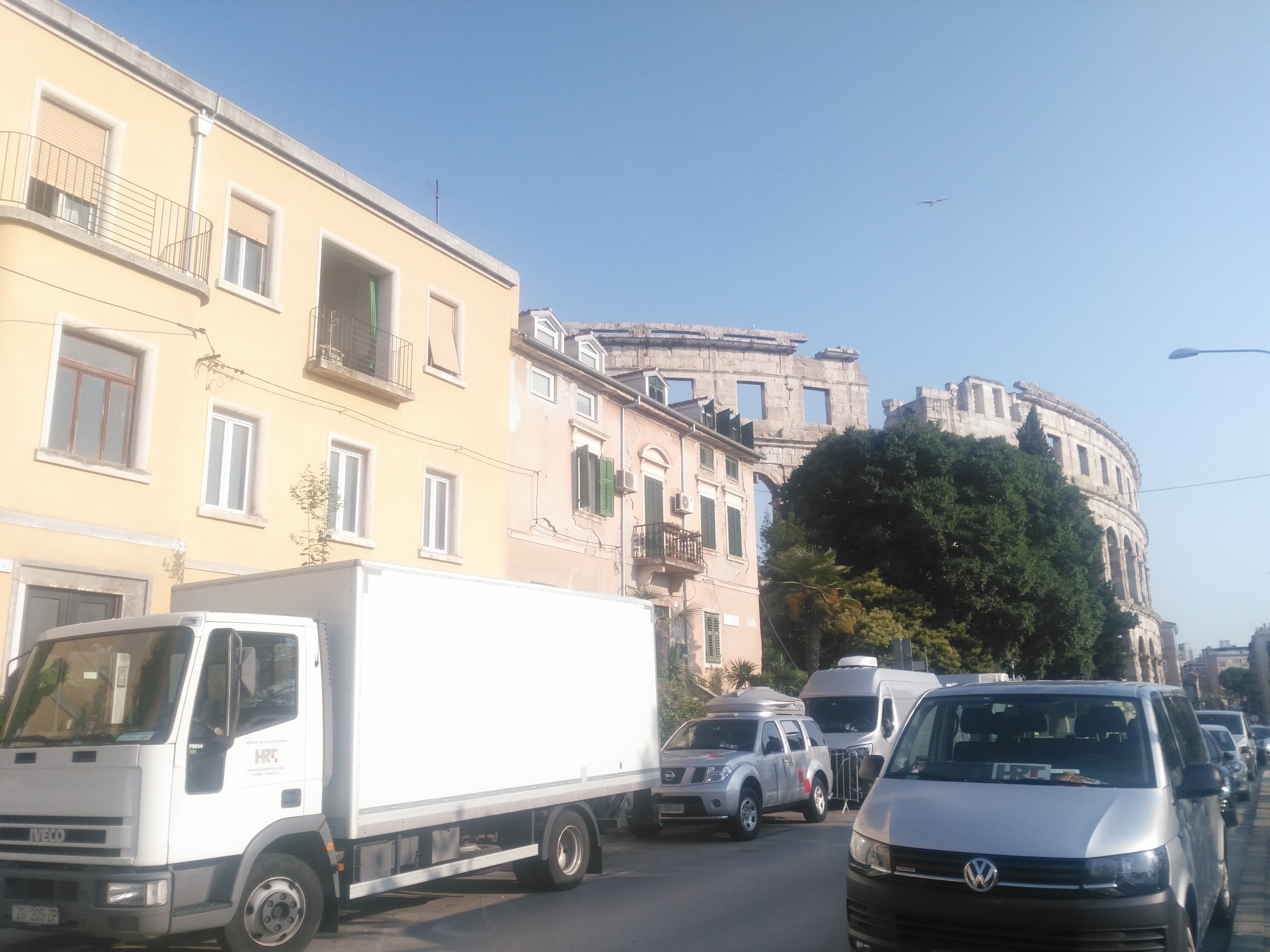
HRT vehicles at the 2021 Pula Film Festival.

- Dnevnik HRT (lit. 'Daily News'), popular midday, evening and midnight news program
- Dobro jutro, Hrvatska (lit. 'Good Morning, Croatia'), mosaic morning show from 7:00 to 9:00 am
- Dobar dan, Hrvatska (lit. 'Good Afternoon, Croatia'), mosaic afternoon show
- Nedjeljom u dva (lit. 'Sunday at Two O'Clock'), weekly talk show
- Transfer, show about the alternative culture and arts (visual arts, music and web culture)
- TV kalendar (lit. 'TV Calendar'), long-running daily historical documentary television series, narrating about historical events, birth/death of people or their discoveries on the same date
- Tko želi biti milijunaš? (Who Wants to Be a Millionaire?), quiz show
- Zvijezde pjevaju (lit. 'Just the Two of Us'), big Saturday singing show
- Lijepom Našom (lit. 'Our Beautiful'), a show focused on Croatian cultural heritage
- Otvoreno (lit. 'Openly'), daily political talk show

==== Former shows ====
- Dan za danom (lit. 'Day After Day'), mosaic afternoon show
- Kviskoteka (quiz show), hosted by Oliver Mlakar, aired in the 1980s and 1990s, later briefly aired on Nova TV.
- Male tajne velikih majstora kuhinje (lit. 'Small Secrets of Big Chefs')
- Motrišta (lit. 'Points of View'), political informative magazine aired in the 1990s
- The Pyramid, weekly show hosted by Željka Ogresta, winner of Rose d'Or, aired 2004–2008; 2014
- Slika na sliku (lit. 'Frame On Frame'), political magazine aired in the 1990s
- Upitnik (lit. 'Question Mark'), quiz show hosted by Joško Lokas, aired in the 2000s, later briefly aired on Nova TV, taken off-air in 2004
- Turbo Limač Show (lit. 'Kids' Saturday Show'), hosted by Siniša Cmrk
- Željka Ogresta i gosti (lit. 'Željka Ogresta and Guests') (talk show), aired in the start of the 1990s and in the start of the 2000s
- Ples sa zvijezdama (Dancing with the Stars), Saturday dancing show

== Radio ==
Map of the eight Croatian Radio regional stations

The Croatian Radio (Hrvatski radio) runs three national and eight local (county-level) stations.

=== National stations ===
The three national stations are available on FM, DAB+, throughout the country and are streamed live via the Internet.

- HR 1 – The primary national-level station, mainly serious programming. News every full hour with oldies and local pop music.
- HR 2 – Entertainment programming including popular music, with news followed by traffic reports at the half-hour mark
- HR 3 – Classical music and radio drama

=== Regional stations ===
- HR Dubrovnik – based in Dubrovnik, covers the Dubrovnik-Neretva County
- HR Knin – based in Knin, covers the Šibenik-Knin County
- HR Osijek – based in Osijek, covers the Osijek-Baranja County
- HR Pula – based in Pula, covers the Istria County
- HR Rijeka – based in Rijeka, covers the Primorje-Gorski Kotar County
- HR Sljeme – based in Zagreb, covers the city and the counties of the Northern Croatia
- HR Split – based in Split, covers the Split-Dalmatia County
- HR Zadar – based in Zadar, covers the Zadar County

The mediumwave transmitter at Zadar was at one time one of the most powerful in Europe and at nighttime could be heard throughout most of the continent with JRT (Yugoslav) and later HR (Croatian) programming from Zagreb and Pula. However it was badly damaged during the Serbian shelling of the city in the early 1990s, and has operated on somewhat reduced power since on 1134 kHz. Transmitter was rebuilt in 2004. It consists of 4 masts, every is 132 meters high. It was taken off the air on 1 January 2014.

=== International service ===
- Voice of Croatia (Glas Hrvatske): Airs programming for Croatians living abroad, Croatia's minority groups and the international community. While mostly in Croatian, the station also features short news and segments in English, German, Italian, Hungarian, and Spanish at different times of the day.

The Voice of Croatia broadcasts 24 hours a day via the following satellites; in Europe, North Africa, the Middle East on the Eutelsat 13C at 13°E and Eutelsat 16A at 16 degrees east for Central and East Europe.

== Logos ==
1956–1990

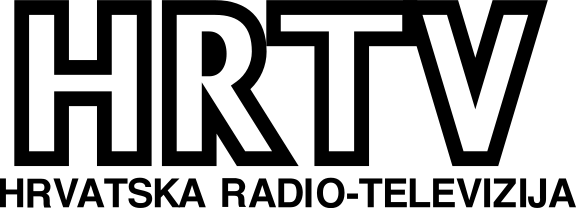
1990

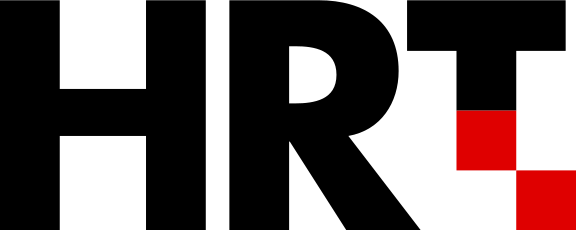
1994–1999

1999–present (black strips)

1999–present (white strips)

== See also ==
- Radio in Croatia
- Television in Croatia
