= Luka Juričić (actor) =

Croatian actor, director and author (born 1983)

- Born: 25 November 1983 (age 42); Pula, SR Croatia, SFR Yugoslavia (now Croatia)
- Education: Academy of Dramatic Art, Zagreb
- Occupation: Actor
- Years active: 1999–present

Luka Juričić (born 25 November 1983) is a Croatian actor, director and author. Juričić debuted alongside fellow Pula actress Jadranka Đokić in Šverceri hlapić (1999) which he also directed. His television roles include Blagoje in Zauvijek susjedi (2008), and Srećko in Dome, slatki dome (2010). Juričić also starred in some films, including Will Not End Here (2008). He is the author of the Croatian TV series Dar mar, which debuted on Nova TV in 2020. Juričić is best known for his theater work. He has starred in such productions as Dok nas smrt ne rastavi and the award-winning Neboder ("Skyscraper").

== Personal life ==
Juričić was born in Pula on 25 November 1983. He attended Italian language school, graduating from the Dante Alighieri High School. Juričić stated that he got the passion for acting when he was in elementary school. In elementary school he started to take drama classes. In early 1997 he started drama school at the Istrian National Theater, in his native Pula. He participated in theater projects from 1997 until 2002, when he enrolled at the Academy of Dramatic Arts in Zagreb, graduating in 2008.

== Career ==
=== Theater ===
Juričić started his acting career with such roles as Otavijo in Štoria ud Otavia i Nikolete, Bepo in Daniel Načinović's Divojke za ženidbu (INK, Pula), and Francis Flute in A Midsummer Night's Dream (HNK Zagreb). He went on to star as the title character in Ballads of Petrica Kerempuh (Gavella), the lead character in Zaljubljenici (INK/FERR), the Priest, mother-in-law, neighbor, sister in Dok nas smrt ne rastavi (Kerempuh), for which he was praised by Matica hrvatska, as Caki in Multicro (HNK Osijek), and as Ante in Miro Gavran's Parellel Worlds (HNK Osijek). In 2009 he was one of the lead characters in the award-winning Neboder ("Skyscraper").

In 2021 a play starring Juričić, Moje istrijansko korona vjenčanje, debuted in Pula. Juričić played several roles in the play, and is also the author of the scenography. The production was well received and his performance was described as "extraordinary". Juričić also wrote librettos, including Vuk i sedam kozlića's ("The Wolf and the Seven Goats"), a collaboration with Romina Vitasović. In the 2000s he was one of the several Croatian stars who performed at the recently opened Moruzgva Theater. He was one of the main characters (Florian) of Floromanija, which premiered at the Požega City Theater in 2017.

=== Children's theater ===
Juričić was the lead character of Ivica Šimić's children's play Rock'n'roll za DVA MIŠA, which debuted in Zagreb in 2008. He is one of the lead characters (playing Zlatko) of Snježana Banović's adaptation of Debela. He starred in the Mala Scena Theater production since its conception in 2008 for over ten years. Juričić stars in the play alongside Ana Begić, who suggested the show to him. Beside being an actor, Juričić is the director of Pula's children's theater Teatar Naranča ("Orange Theater"). He has stated that he manages to "balance the obligations of the stage and the Orange Theater" thanks to good organization and quality staff.

=== Television ===
In 2007 Juričić had a part in an episode of Luda kuća. In 2008 he played Blagoje in the Croatian TV series Zauvijek susjedi (2008). He had small parts in Dobre namjere (2008), Bitange i princeze and Odmori se, zaslužio si (2009). In 2010 he played Srećko in Dome, slatki dome (18 March 2010 - 22 July 2010). He played young Đuka Lotar in an episode of Najbolje godine (2011) and made a cameo in Stipe u gostima (2011). In 2020 he authored the TV series Dar mar, which debuted on Nova TV in 2020.

=== Film ===
Juričić's first film role was in the 1999 movie Šverceri hlapić, alongside Jadranka Đokić, who debuted in that movie too. Juričić was also the director of the movie. He later starred in Čejen Černić's short film Pratioci alongside Urša Raukar-Gamulin and Luka Petrušić. He had a small part in Will Not End Here (2008).

== Awards and honours ==
Year	Award	Category	Nominated work	Result
2008	Omišalj Folk Theater Festival	Leading Actor	Ballads of Petrica Kerempuh	Won

== Filmography ==
=== Stage ===
Year	Title	Role	Notes
2002	Štoria ud Otavia i Nikolete	Otavijo	Istrian National Theater
2002	Felix		Istrian National Theater
2004	Divojke za ženidbu	Bepo	Istrian National Theater
2006	Veliki zavodnik	Aka, Grga, Zlatko	KNAP (Zagreb)
2007	Zaljubljenici	Fabrizio	Istrian National Theater
2007	A Midsummer Night's Dream	Francis Flute	Croatian National Theatre in Zagreb
2007	Dok nas smrt ne rastavi	Priest, mother-in-law, neighbor, sister	Kerempuh Theatre
2008	A Midsummer Night's Dream	Francis Flute	Dubrovnik Summer Festival
2008	Rock’n’roll za dva miša	miš Cijo	Mala Scena Theater (children's play)
2008	Ballads of Petrica Kerempuh	Petrica	Gavella Drama Theatre
2008–2018	Debela	Zlatko	Mala Scena Theater (children's play)
2009	Jaje	Joja	Lut. Scena I.B. Mažuranić (Zagreb)
2009	Neboder	Toni	Istrian National Theater
2010	Multicro	Caki	Croatian National Theatre in Osijek
2010	Parallel Worlds	Ante	Croatian National Theatre in Osijek
2017	Floromanija	Florian	Požega City Theater

=== Film roles ===
Year	Title	Role	Notes
1999	Šverceri hlapić	Don Pancettone	
2008	Pratioci	The trainee	Short film
2008	Will Not End Here	Jacqueline's grandson	
2024	My Late Summer	Mate	

=== Television roles ===
Year	Title	Role	Notes
2005	Bitange i princeze	Anđelko	1 episode
2007	Luda kuća	Kleptomaniac	1 episode
2004–2007	Zauvijek susjedi	Blagoje	5 episodes
2008	Dobre namjere	Rapist	2 episodes
2009	Bitange i princeze	Police officer	Episode Radujte se bitange
2010	Odmori se, zaslužio si	Davor	Episode Bio Bajs
2010	Dome, slatki dome	Srećko	Main role; 9 episodes
2011	Najbolje godine	Young Đuka Lotar	1 episode
2011	Stipe u gostima	Salesman	Episode Sretna vijest

=== Voice-over roles ===
Film
Year	Title	Role
2007	Surf's Up	Additional voices
