= List of original programs broadcast by HRT =

HRT (short for Hrvatska Radiotelevizija, lit. Croatian Radiotelevision) is Croatia's national network of television and radio channels serving as the direct successors to the Yugoslav era networks TVZ (Televizija Zagreb) and Radio Zagreb. It is divided into two independently funded subsections, those being the TV and radio divisions. This article focuses specifically on original scripted and unscritped programming aired on the four networks belonging to HRT (aptly titled HRT 1, HRT 2, HRT 3 and HRT 4) and will not be including licensed programming nor titles created and aired on its radio counterpart.

== Scripted ==
=== Former programming ===
1950s
Title	Genre	Number of seasons	Creator(s)	Original airdates	Notes
Space Patrol (Svemirska patrola)	Science fiction, family	1 (miniseries)	Ilko Rosić	28 February 1959-28 May 1959	

1960s
Title	Genre	Number of seasons	Creator(s)	Original airdates	Notes
The Crew of the Century (Stoljetna eskadra)	Action, adventure, comedy, period piece, family	1 (miniseries)	Daniel Marušić	4 November 1961- 9 June 1962	
Inspector Mask (Inspektor Maska)	Animation, mystery, comedy, family	1 (miniseries)	Dragutin Vunak	1962-1963	
On the Spot (Na licu mjesta)	Comedy	1 (miniseries)	Daniel Marušić	3 March 1963- 13 April 1963	
Somewhere Beside Us (Tu negdje pokraj nas)	Comedy drama	1 (miniseries)	Milan Grgić, Berislav Makarović	16 January 1965- 13 March 1965	
Dilemmas (Dileme)	Drama	1 (miniseries)	Milan Grgić	4 December 1965- 18 June 1966	
The Seventh Pillar of Power (Sedma sila)	Sitcom	1	Fadil Hadžić	3 September 1966- 1 October 1966	
Professor Balthazar (Profesor Baltazar)	Animation, comedy, family, science fiction	4	Zlatko Grgić	1967-2005	
When Sword Was Justice (Kad je mač krojio pravdu)	Period piece, drama	1 (miniseries)	Anton Marti	31 August 1967- 12 October 1967	
The Wasp (Osa)	Comedy	1 (miniseries)	Fadil Hadžić	17 March 1968- 12 May 1968	
Marathon (Maratonci)	Comedy	1 (miniseries)	Milan Grgić	25 April 1968- 30 May 1968	
Očenašek's Diary (Dnevnik Očenašeka)	Period piece, drama	1 (miniseries)	Eduard Galić	15 January 1969- 5 February 1969	Based on the 1937 novel of the same name by Vjekoslav Majer
A Sorrowful Fall (Sumorna jesen)	Drama, war, period piece	1 (miniseries)	Ivan Šibl	12 March 1969- 7 May 1969	
Under a New Roof (Pod novim krovovima)	Drama, anthology	1 (miniseries)	Alojz Majetić, Branislav Glumac	17 September 1969- 15 October 1969	
The Council of the Curious (Udruženje radoznalih)	Family, comedy, educational, animation	1	Milivoj Matošec	1969-1972	

1970s
Title	Genre	Number of seasons	Creator(s)	Original airdates	Notes
The Lawyer (Fiškal)	Period piece, drama	1 (miniseries)	Joakim Marušić	21 January 1970 – 11 February 1970	Based on the 1881 novel of the same name by Ante Kovačić
A Man All by Himself (Sam čovjek)	Drama, period piece	1 (miniseries)	Eduard Galić	13 May 1970 – 3 June 1970	Based on the 1937 novel of the same name by Ivo Kozarčanin
Landowners (Mejaši)	Comedy drama	1 (miniseries)	Ivo Vrbanić	11 October 1970 – 15 November 1970	Served as a sequel to the made-for-TV movie Pig Slaughter (Kolinje) and received two sequels: The Folks from Gruntovec (Gruntovčani) and The Indestructibles (Neuništvi)
Our Little Town (Naše malo misto)	Comedy drama, period piece	1 (miniseries)	Miljenko Smoje	22 February 1970 – 28 March 1971	Smoje eventually adapted the script for the series into a short story collection titled The Stories from Our Little Town (Priče iz našeg malog mista). The series was popular enough to receive a theatrical spin-off film Servantes from Our Little Town (Servantes iz malog mista) in 1982, which had the same cast and crew as the original series. Smoje eventually penned the novel Big City (Velo misto), which served as a sequel to the original series, which also received a TV adaptation of the same name
Golden Boy (Zlatni mladić)	Period piece, drama	1 (miniseries)	Vladimir Gerić	1970	Based on the 1928 novel The Golden Boy and His Victims (Zlatni mladić i njegove žrtve) by August Cesarec
The Marital Ways of Love (Ljubav na bračni način)	Comedy drama, romance	1 (miniseries)	Fedor Vidas	1 July 1970 – 29 July 1970	
Big and Small (Veliki i Mali)	Family, drama	2	Milan Grgić	25 February 1970 – 4 May 1971	
Where the Wild Boars Go (Kuda idu divlje svinje)	Crime, drama, war, period piece	1 (miniseries)	Ivo Štivičić	28 April 1971 – 30 June 1971	
Bolta's Adventures and Misadventures (Boltine zgode i nezgode)	Comedy drama	1	Matija Poljaković	1971	
The Bench on St. George Square (Klupa na Jurjevskom)	Drama, romance	1 (miniseries)	Ivica Ivanac, Zvonimir Bajšić	6 January 1972 – 10 February 1972	
Oh What Are We in This World (Ča smo svi na ovon svitu)	Comedy drama, period piece	1 (miniseries)	Daniel Marušić	7 October 1973 – 25 November 1973	Based on the 1940 short story collection The Book of Marko Uvodić of Split (Libar Marka Uvodića Splićanina) by Marko Uvodić, who, in turn, based the characters and stories off of real world figures and events
Some Man (Čovik i po)	Sitcom	1	13 October–15 December	Mirko Božić	
In the Registrar's Office (U registraturi)	Period piece, drama	1 (miniseries)	17 February 1974 – 16 April 1974	Joakim Marušić	Based on the 1888 serialized novel of the same name by Ante Kovačić
Storytime (Vrijeme za bajku)	Fantasy, family, anthology	1 (miniseries)	1974	Višnja Lasta	
The Folks from Gruntovec (Gruntovčani)	Comedy drama	1 (minseries)	21 September 1975 – 23 November 1975	Krešimir Golik	Served as a sequel to Pig Slaughter and Landowners, however, due to higher popularity and ratings, it received a larger place in the cultural zeitgeist, receiving a sequel of its own (The Indesctructibles), as well as an adaptation in the form of a theatrical play
The Passion of Saint Margaret the Virgin (Muka svete Margarite)	Historical drama	1 (miniseries)	Eduard Galić	1975	
Wartime and Everything Else (Vrijeme ratno i poratno)	Sitcom, war, period piece	2	Drago Gervais	17 May 1975 – 26 July 1975	The first 3 episodes were based on the 1964 play Vuk Bubalo by Branko Ćopić, whilst the rest are original stories set in the same continuity
The Flames of Kapela (Kapelski kresovi)	Drama, war, period piece	1 (miniseries)	Ivan Hetrich, Ivica Ivanac, Zlatko Sudović	30 November 1975 – 22 February 1976	Based on the 1975 novel of the same name by Veljko Kovačević
The Little Revolutionary (Mali buntovnik)	Drama, war, period piece	1 (miniseries)	Vladimir Gerić	1976	Based on the 1975 Slovenian novel of the same name by France Bevk
There's Some Hope for Nomads After All (Ima nade za nomade)	Comedy	1 (miniseries)	Rudolf Harmić	6 March 1976 – 24 April 1976	
Nikola Tesla	Historical drama	1 (miniseries)	Eduard Galić, Ivica Ivanac	11 September 1977 – 13 November 1977	
The Cat Under the Helmet (Mačak pod šljemom)	Comedy, war, period piece	1 (miniseries)	Berislav Makarović	1 October 1978 – 5 November 1978	Based on the 1959 novel of the same name by Joža Horvat
Full Steam Ahead (Punom parom)	Sitcom	2	Kazimir Klarić	21 May 1978 – 1 June 1980	The season two finale titled The Trumpet (Truba) was banned from airing on TV by the Yugoslavia's Communist Party due to its unfavourable portrayal in it. It was considered lost until finally airing for the first time on 18 September 2012
The Devil's Seed (Đavolje sjeme)	Dark fantasy, horror, drama, period piece	1 (miniseries)	Vanča Kljaković	19 February 1979 – 26 February 1979	Based on the play Faust by Johann Wolfgang van Goethe, with the setting of the story being changed from 19th century Wittenberg to Zagreb in the 1930s and all of the characters have received new Croatian names and identities
The Lighthouse (Svjetionik)	Action, adventure, drama	1(miniseries)	Nedjeljko Fabrio	15 February 1979 – 22 March 1979	
Scenes From Family Life (Prizori iz obiteljskog života)	Comedy, anthology	1 (miniseries)	Milan Grgić	21 April 1979 – 2 June 1979	

1980s
Title	Genre	Number of seasons	Creator(s)	Original airdates	Notes
The Big City (Velo misto)	Comedy drama, period piece	1 (miniseries)	Miljenko Smoje	30 November 1980 – 1 March 1981	Based on the 1971 short story collection The Big City Chronicles (Kronika Velog Mista) by Miljenko Smoje and serves as the sequel to Our Little Town
Jelenko	Family, drama, adventure	1 (miniseries)	Maja Gluščević, Obrad Gluščević	1981	The screenplay for the series got adapted into a novel of the same name, whilst the series itself was inspired by the 1975 short story The White Deer (Bijeli jelen) by Vladimir Nazor
The Unconqurable City (Nepokoreni grad)	Historical drama, war	1 (miniseries)	Milan Šećerović	1982	
Troubles of a Branimir (Nevolje jednog Branimira)	Drama, family	1 (miniseries)	Ante Granik, Zvonimir Iljić	1982	
Smoggers (Smogovci)	Comedy drama, family	6	Hrvoje Hitrec	4 April 1982 – 16 February 1997	Based on the series of novels of the same name by Hrvoje Hitrec
Traps (Zamke)	Historical drama, action, adventure, thriller, war	1 (miniseries)	Mirko Sabolović, Berislav Makarović	8 May 1983- 15 May 1983	
Gabrijel	Comedy	1 (miniseries)	Željko Senečić, Eduard Tomičić	13–15 July 1984	
Inspector Vinko (Inspektor Vinko)	Police procedural, sitcom	1	Krešimir Golik	2 December 1984 - 20 January 1985	
The Lying Melita (Lažeš, Melita)	Comedy drama, family	1 (miniseries)	Ivan Kušan	1984	Based on the 1965 novel of the same name by Ivan Kušan
Beggars and Sons (Prosjaci i sinovi)	Comedy drama, period piece	1 (miniseries)	Ivan Raos	1984	The screenplay for the series got adapted into a novel of the same name
Don't Give Up Floki (Ne daj se, Floki)	Comedy drama, family	1 (miniseries)	Zoran Tadić	1985	
The Croatian National Revival (Hrvatski narodni preporod)	Historical drama	1 (miniseries)	Eduard Galić	1985	
Hajdučki Gaj	Period piece, drama	1 (miniseries)	Drago Kekanović	8 March 1986 - 24 March 1986	Based on the unfinished 1942 novel The Ship on the Creek (Brod na potoku) by Ivan Goran Kovačić
Casefiles (Dosije)	Police procedural, drama, crime	1	Ljiljana Jolić Zoran Drinbach	1986	
The Voyage to Vučjak (Putovanje u Vučjak)	Period piece, drama	1 (miniseries)	Eduard Galić, Ivo Štivičić	28 September 1986 – 4 January 1987	Based on the 1923 play Vučjak by Miroslav Krleža
The Hug (Zagrljaj)	Drama	1 (miniseries)	Antun Vrdoljak	1988	
Heavenly Birds (Ptice nebeske)	Comedy drama	1 (miniseries)	Ivo Brešan	1989 - 1990	The screenplay for the series got adapted into a novel of the same name

1990s
Title	Genre	Number of seasons	Creator(s)	Original airdates	Notes
The Indesctructibles (Neuništivi)	Comedy drama	1	Vladimir Tadej	15 September 1990 – 3 November 1990	The events of the series take place in the same universe as a four other series produced by HRT (Landowners, The Folks from Gruntovec, Our Little Town and The Big City), as well as two Serbian series (The Musicians and The Citizens of the Village of Lug).
Foreigner (Tuđinac)	Drama	1 (miniseries)	Nikola Vončina	1991	Based on the 1911 novel of the same name by Dinko Šimunović
Looking For a Soulmate (Tražim srodnu dušu)	Drama	1 (miniseries)	Berislava Makarović, Mira Boglić	1990	
The Little Flying Bears (Mali leteći medvjedići)	Animation, family, adventure, fantasy	1	Dušan Vukotić, Pero Kvesić, Neven Petričić	2 September 1990-30 June 1991	International coproduction between HRT and the Canadian network The Family Channel
Operation Barbarossa (Operacija Barbarossa)	Teen drama, comedy drama, mystery, adventure	1 (miniseries)	Branko Schmidt, Ivan Kušan	1 November 1990 - 13 December 1990	Based on the 1963 novel The Mysterious Boy (Zagonetni dječak) by Ivan Kušan
Conductors and Musicians (Dirigenti i mužikaši)	Drama, romance	1 (miniseries)	Krešimir Golik, Mladen Kerstner	1990-1991	
Was Somebody Looking For Me? (Jel' me netko tražio?)	Sitcom	4	Stevo Cvikić	September 1991- May 1995	Croatian remake of the American series Cheers. It received a contemporary revival titled Nad Lipom 35 (On Lipa Street 35) which aired on the network Nova TV in 2006
Zlatko and the Detectives (Zlatko i detektivi)	Mystery, comedy, family, crime	2	Sven Medvešek	1992-1993	The series had an interactive format where viewers could call in to guess who the culprit of the central crime was each episode
Footsy (Nogalo)	Animation, comedy, family	1	Ivica Šegvić	1995-2004	
Comedies (Komedijice)	Comedy, anthology	1	Milan Grgić	1997	
A Family Matter (Obiteljska stvar)	Crime, drama, romance, thriller	1 (miniseries)	Martina Aničić	18 April 1998 – 4 July 1998	
Love or Death (Ljubav ili smrt)	Teen drama, romance, mystery	1 (miniseries)	Ivan Kušan	14 February 1999 – 28 February 1999	Based on the 1987 novel of the same name by Ivan Kušan
Our House, Our Rules (Naša kućica, naša slobodica)	Comedy	1 (miniseries)	Zoran Budak	1999	

2000s
Title	Genre	Number of seasons	Creator(s)	Original airdates	Notes
Ours and Yours (Naši i vaši)	Sitcom	2	Mario Raguž, Vanča Kljaković	14 April 2000 – 6 July 2002	
Get That Thief (Drž'te lopova)	Mystery, anthology, crime	2	Željko Duvnjak	2000-2002	Much like Zlatko and the Detectives before it,the series had an interactive format where viewers could call in to guess who the culprit of the central crime was each episode, albeit this one was aimed at a more adult audience
Lapitch the Little Shoemaker (Hlapićeve nove zgode)	Animation, adventure, family, fantasy	1	Milan Blažeković	1 September 2001 – 10 March 2003	A spin-off of the 1997 film of the same name, which was, in turn, based on the 1913 novel The Brave Adventures of Lapitch by Ivana Brlić Mažuranić
A New Age (Novo doba)	Comedy drama	1 (miniseries)	Hrvoje Hribar, Renato Baretić, Ivica Ivanišević, Ante Tomić	24 February 2002 – 24 March 2002	
The Golden Pot (Zlatni vrč)	Sitcom	1	Zoran Sudar	9 March 2004 – 6 July 2004	The second Croatian remake of the American series Cheers
The Meaners (Zlikavci)	Adult animation, comedy	2	Goran Pirš	26 August 2004-26 May 2006	Based on the radio show of the same name created by the stand-up comedy troop Zločesta djeca that aired on Radio 101
Villa Maria	Soap opera	1	Alicia Carvajal	20 September 2004 – 29 April 2005	One of the side characters in the series was detective Marko Prilika (nicknamed Čens), played by actor Slavko Juraga, who first appeared as the lead character of the novels White Mornings (Bijela jutra) and Marching Ahead (Marševski korak) which would later go on to be adapted into the 2006 television series Balkan Inc, which aired on the network Nova TV, with the titular character being played by actor Aleksandar Cvjetković. The connection between the two IPs stems from the fact that both the screenplay for Villa Maria and the original Čens series of novels were written by Croatian author Robert Naprta
Class Dismissed (Kad zvoni?)	Teen drama, romance	1	Vlatka Vorkapić, Zoran Ferić	13 February 2005 – 26 June 2005	
Bums and Princesses (Bitange i Princeze)	Sitcom	5	Goran Kulenović	15 April 2005 – 8 March 2010	Croatian remake of the American series Friends
Crazy House (Luda kuća)	Comedy drama	5	Tanja Kirhmajer, Zinka Kiseljak	28 September 2005 – 26 June 2010	
Love in the Offside (Ljubav u zaleđu)	Soap opera, sports drama	1	Zoran Budak, Branko Ivanda	3 October 2005 – 7 June 2006	
Mrtvi kutovi (Dead Ends)	Comedy drama	1 (miniseries)	Aldo Tardozzi	27 November 2005-11 December 2005	A sequel to Tardozzi's 2005 made-for-TV film of the same name (later co-opted as the series pilot)
You Deserve a Break (Odmori se, zaslužio si)	Sitcom	5	Goran Tribuson, Snježana Tribuson, Neven Hitrec	26 February 2006 – 1 January 2014	Originally conceived and pitched as a sequel to the 2002 comedy drama film God Forbid a Worse Thing Should Happen (Ne dao Bog većeg zla) which was written and directed by the Tribusons, however, that idea had been abanndoned not long after the start of the show's development. It is also notable for featuring a crossover with the 2008 sitcom Stipe is Paying Us a Visit (Stipe u gostima), which was also produced by HRT, with this being one of the rare instances of a crossover event in the history of Croatian television. Until 2024, it was the biggest ratings succsses for the network
Lapitch Plays Sports (Hlapićeve sportske igre)	Animation, family	2	Milan Blažeković	2006-2008	
Ordinary People (Obični ljudi)	Soap opera	1	Jelena Veljača, Branko Ivanda, Nikola Ivanda	9 October 2006 – 1 June 2007	Based on the 2004 novel The Family Way by Tony Parsons
Theater at Home (Kazalište u kući)	Sitcom	1	Ivana Vanja Runjić, Olja Runić, Diana Pečkaj Vuković	2 December 2006 – 9 June 2007	Croatian remake of the Serbian TV series of the same name (originally titled Pozorište u kući). It was the first attempt to remake the original series for modern audiences, being followed by a Serbian remake in 2007
The Pride of the Rathkays (Ponos Ratkajevih)	Soap opera, period piece	1	Morana Foretić, Jelena Svilar, Jelena Veljača	8 October 2007 – 16 June 2008	
Good Intentions (Dobre namjere)	Crime, drama	1	Milo Grisogono, Ljubo Lasić	6 November 2007 – 1 July 2008	
The Sad Rich Man (Tužni bogataš)	Mystery, drama, crime	1 (miniseries)	Davor Žmegač, Ognjen Sviličić	2008	Based on the 2002 novel of the same name by Pavao Pavličić
Stipe is Paying Us a Visit (Stipe u gostima)	Sitcom	7	Ištvan Filaković, Ognjen Sviličić, Dražen Žarković	9 March 2008 – 29 June 2014	Currently holds the status of the only Croatian series with over 6 seasons
Things Will Turn Out Well Eventually (Sve će biti dobro)	Soap opera	1	Diana Pečkaj Vuković	22 September 2008 – 1 July 2009	
Mammoth (Mamutica)	Police procedural, drama, crime	2	Zoran Margetić, Robert Orhel, Vlado Bulić, Nenad Stipanić	15 November 2008 – 17 July 2010	
Law! (Zakon!)	Police procedural, sitcom, crime	1	Zoran Lazić, Tonči Kožul	5 January 2009 – 15 April 2009	
Valley of the Sun (Dolina sunca)	Soap opera	1	Diana Pečkaj Vuković	21 September 2009 – 15 July 2010	

2010s
Title	Genre	Number of seasons	Creator(s)	Original airdates	Notes
Home, Sweet Home (Dome, slatki dome)	Sitcom	1	Morana Foretić, Jelena Svilar	18 March 2010 – 22 July 2010	
Grapevine (Loza)	Drama	2	Goran Rukavina, Dario Pleić	9 October 2011 – 29 January 2012	
Diary of a Blonde (Dnevnik plavuše)	Comedy, romance	1 (miniseries)	Aldo Tardozzi, Tomislav Rukavina	18 October 2010-4 February 2011	
Weddings and Funerals (Provodi i sprovodi)	Sitcom	1	Vinko Brešan, Goran Kulenović	19 September 2011 – 30 January 2012	
Sunday Mornings and Saturday Evenings (Nedjeljom ujutro, subotom navečer)	Comedy	1	Predrag Ličina, Jelena Paljan	16 September 2012 – 30 December 2012	
Public Relations (Glasnogovornici)	Drama	Failed pilot	Sara Hribar	2012	
Runway (Špica)	Sitcom	Failed pilot	Filip Šovagović	2012	
Rest in Peace (Počivali u miru)	Crime, drama, mystery, thriller, neo-noir	3	Goran Rukavina, Koraljka Meštrović	4 January 2013 – 19 March 2019	In early 2014, after the immense critical and audience success of the first season in Croatia and Europe as a whole, the production company Lionsgate acquired the rights for an American remake, however, no updates came after the initial purchase
Danica	Family, animation, educational	1	Ivana Guljašević	2 March 2013-6 January 2014	
In Treatment (Na terapiji)	Drama	1 (miniseries)	Aleš Pavlin	16 September 2013 – 15 November 2013	Croatian remake of the Israeli series BeTipul
Vox Populi (Glas naroda)	Sitcom	1	Ognjen Sviličić	22 September 2014 – 19 January 2015	
Black and White World (Crno-bijeli svijet)	Comedy drama, period piece	4	Goran Kulenović, Igor Mirković	2 March 2015 – 2 March 2021	
Don't Tell a Soul (Nemoj nikome reći)	Teen comedy	2	Aleksandra Osman	18 October 2015 – 26 May 2017	
Set-Up (Montirani proces)	Sketch comedy	1	Borna Sor	31 December 2015 – 16 February 2016	
Subsequently (Naknadno)	Sitcom	1	Željko Pervan	20 September 2016 – 27 December 2016	
Road Patrol (Patrola na cesti)	Crime, drama	1 (miniseries)	Jurica Pavičić, Zvonimir Jurić	24 January 2016 – 21 February 2016	Based on the 2008 short story of the same name by Jurica Pavičić
The Paper (Novine)	Crime, drama, thriller, neo noir	3	Ivica Đikić	16 October 2016 – 4 May 2020	The first and second seasons were the first Croatian series to be acquired by Netflix for international distribution in April 2018
Charo and Robin (Mišo i Robin)	Animation, family, adventure, educational	1	Vjekoslav Živković, Marija Ivšić, Denis Alenti	16 December 2016-16 January 2017	
Castle Guard (Čuvar dvorca)	Thriller, drama, period piece	1 (miniseries)	Lukas Nola	18 September 2017 – 16 October 2017	
Barber Troubles (Ko te šiša)	Sitcom	5	Petra Venier, Dijana Merdanović	25 December 2017 – 28 June 2020	

2020s
Title	Genre	Number of seasons	Creator(s)	Original airdates	Notes
The Missing (Nestali)	Action, drama, war, period piece	2	Joško Lokas	3 February 2020 – 28 February 2022	
Minus and Plus (Minus i plus)	Sitcom	1	Ognjen Sviličić	31 December 2020 – 12 October 2021	The series' pilot was released as a made-for-TV New Year's Eve Special that aired on HRT1, with the series starting its proper run in September of 2021
Mrkomir the First (Mrkomir Prvi)	Sitcom, period piece	5	Ognjen Sviličić, Ivan Maloča	31 December 2020-26 May 2026	The series' pilot was released as a made-for-TV New Year's Eve Special that aired on HRT1, with the series starting its proper run in December of 2021. The final season was supposed to run for another 20 episodes (with the finale focusing on Mrkomir being crowned as the king of Croatia) all of which have been scripted and filmed in October of 2025, however, HRT stopped airing them after the tenth episode, providing no proper explanation for the early cancelation
The Silence (Šutnja)	Neo noir, mystery, drama, thriller, war, crime	2	Miodrag Sila, Nebojša Taraba	10 December 2021 – 8 November 2023	Based on the 2014 trilogy of novels of the same name by Drago Hedl and coproduced with the Ukrainian streaming service OLL TV
The Last Socialist Artifact (Područje bez signala)	Drama	1 (miniseries)	Dalibor Matanić, Ankica Jurić Tilić	27 December 2021 – 31 January 2022	Based on the 2015 novel of the same name by Robert Perišić
Metropolitans (Metropolitanci)	Comedy drama	2	Dario Vince	26 September 2022 – 25 March 2025	
The Handymen (Majstori)	Sitcom, family	1	Sara Hribar	24 December 2022 – 3 January 2023	
Oblak in the Service of Law (Oblak u službi zakona)	Sitcom, police procedural, crime	3	Snježana Tribuson, Goran Tribuson	9 January 2023 – 12 May 2025	
The Highlands (Gora)	Action, adventure, drama	1	Maja Pek - Brünjes, Danijel Pek	2 October 2023 – 12 December 2023	
White Trail (Bijeli put)	Crime, drama, mystery	1	Emir Imamović	30 September 2024 – 4 November 2024	
Tree and Bee (Drvo i Pčela)	Animation, comedy, eductional, family, adventure	1	Denis Alenti	18 January 2026-1 February 2026	An international coproduction between HRT, the German children's TV network Kika and the national television programmes of Finland (YLE), Sweden (SVT), Denmark (DRD) and Estonia (EES)

Current programming (scripted)
Title	Genre	Creator(s)	Start of airing	Notes
Diary of a Schlager Singer (Dnevnik velikog Perice)	Comedy drama, period piece, musical, romance	Albino Uršić	8 March 2021	A sequel to the 1970 musical comedy film One Song a Day Takes Mischief Away (Tko pjeva zlo ne misli) which was directed by Krešimir Golik and adapted by Golik and Ivo Škarbalo from the novella Little Perica's Diary (Dnevnik malog Perice) by Vjekoslav Majer
Shame (Sram)	Teen drama, romance	Maja Fišter, Tomislav Stojanović	27 October 2024	Croatian remake of the Norwegian series Skam. The series has amassed 164. 317 viewers per episode and over 12 million additional viewers on its tie-in YouTube channel, website and social media pages, making it the biggest ratings succsess in the history of HRT's scripted programming since the sitcom You Deserve a Break (Odmori se, zaslužio si)
Blaž Amongst Women (Blaž među ženama)	Comedy drama, romance	Branko Ružić, Goran Kulenović	29 September 2025	Originally it was intended to be produced for the network Nova TV, however, despite accepting the pitch, they rejected the pilot, resulting in the series moving production to HRT
Get a Grip, Roberta (Roberta, saberi se)	Comedy drama	Armanda Prenkaj, Lana Kosovac	7 May 2026	The pilot episode was released as an exclusive to HRT's VOD platform HRTi, however, the network has not confirmed wheater it intends on ordering a full series
How to Survive in Croatia (Kako preživjeti u Hrvatskoj)	Sitcom	Robert Knjaz	9 September 2026	Based on the Cody McClain Brown's 2014 Croatian Saga duology of memoirs. It is also Robert Knjaz's first attempt at a scripted series. The first four episodes were released to HRT's VOD platform HRTi as exclusive content prior to the start of the official TV airing. Episodes 5 through 8 were released to HRTi the following week and episode 9 through 12 the next
Our Beauties (Lijepe naše)	Comedy drama	Nataša Dangubić, Zrinka Šamija	22 September 2026	Initial pitches of the series intended for it to be a sitcom about the communal life of two divorced female friends, however, Dangubić (in cooperation with Zrinka Šamija and Marin Lisjak who act as the co-writers on the product) realized that the series had an equal amount of both comedic and serious potential and decided to shift the genre from a sitcom to a comedy drama. The first episode of the series will receive an exclusive digital premiere on the HRTi VOD platform a week prior to its TV airing

Upcoming programming (scripted)
Title	Genre	Creator(s)	Release date	Notes
Murder in Paradise (Ubojstvo u raju)	Police procedural, mystery, comedy drama, crime	Maja Fišter	2027	Croatian remake of the 2011 British series Death in Paradise
Suspicious Circumstances (Sumnjive okolnosti)	Mystery, thriller, drama, urban fantasy, crime	Daria Stilin	TBA	An international coproduction between the Croatian production company Antitalent and the UK-based Big Light Productions. Currently it stands as the most expensive scripted series produced by HRT, with a budget of 1,2 million euros
Professor Balthazar (Profesor Baltazar)	Animation, comedy, family, science fiction	Dino Krpan	TBA	A contemporary remake of the cult classic Croatian animated series of the same name, which aired for 4 seasons from 1967 through 2005. The pilot episode, Professor Balthazar: To Dig or Not to Dig (Professor Baltazar: Hektorovo otkriće), has received a limited theatrical release across independent theatres in Zagreb in March of 2026, opening to positive reviews from both critics and audiences

== Unscripted and documentaries ==
=== Former programming ===
1950s
Title	Genre	Creator(s)	Original airdates)	Notes
Mendo and Slavica (Mendo i Slavica)	Children's television	Bruno Milačić	1958-1965	

1960s
Title	Genre	Creator(s)	Original airdates	Notes
TV Mail (TV Pošta)	Talk show	Silvije Hum, Vladimir Fučijaš	1964-2008	Hum and Fučijaš would later change the name of the series to Critical Point (Kritična točka)

1970s
Title	Genre	Creator(s)	Original airdates	Notes
Adriatic Encounters (Jadranski susreti)	Competition	Oliver Mlakar, Ljubo Jelčić, Helga Vlahović	1978-1980	

1980s
Title	Genre	Creator(s)	Original airdates	Notes
Kviskoteka	Competition	Lazo Goluža	3 April 1980 – 1 June 1995	

1990s
Title	Genre	Creator(s)	Original airdates	Notes
A Picture of a Picture (Slikom na sliku)	Talk show	Denis Latin	1991 - 1997	
Turbo Limach Show	Competition, children's television	Siniša Cmrk	1992 - 2003	
Wheel of Fortune (Kolo sreće)	Competition	Oliver Mlakar	25 October 1993 – 21 June 2002	A Croatian reworking of the US competition show of the same name. A modernized version of is airing on the Croatian branch of the RTL network since 18 May 2015
Speaking Latin (Latinica)	Talk show	Denis Latin	12 January 1993 – 17 January 2011	
Module 8/ Park 01	Competition	Boris Mirković, Kristijan Ugrina	1994 - 2005	
The Five (Petica)	Sports	Božo Sušec	1995 - 2006	
The Stars Above (Zvijezde iznad)	Talk show	Ivo Štivičić	1995 - 1996	
Our Beautiful Homeland (Lijepom našom)	Music	Branko Uvodić	1995 - 2000	
Viewpoints	Talk show	Denis Latin	1996 - 2000	
Between Us (Među nama)	Talk show	Jasna Burić	1996 - 2013	
Croatian Kingdom (Hrvatsko kraljevstvo)	Historical documentary, miniseries	Neven Budak, Miljenko Bukovčan	1997	
The Seven Peaks (Sedam vrhova)	Travel documentary	Stipe Božić	1997	
Cro-Session	Music	Jasna Bilušić	1999	
Apples and Oranges (Kruške i jabuke)	Cooking show	Mirjana Rogila, Duško Čurić	1999 - 2005	

2000s
Title	Genre	Creator(s)	Original airdates	Notes
Crane (Dizalica)	Children's television		2000	
Mysterious Middle Ages (Tajnoviti srednji vijek)	Historical documentary	Božidar Domagoj Burić	2001	
The Mountains and the Sea (Krš i more)	Travel documentary	Božidar Domagoj Burić	2001	
Kokice (Popcorn)	Children's television	Sandra Bosnar	13 January 2003 – 22 November 2021	
The Depths (Dubine)	Travel documentary	Stipe Božić	2003	
Weakest Link (Najslabija karika)	Competition	Nina Violić	26 April 2004 – 31 May 2010	Croatian reworking of the British show of the same name
The Big Yellow Chick (Žutokljunac)	Children's television	Antonija Stanićiši	2004 - 2008	
Sanja	Talk show		2004 - 2005	
Late Nights with Joško Lokas (Večer s Joškom Lokasom)	Talk show		2004	
The Pyramid (Piramida)	Talk show	Željko Ogresta	31 October 2004 - 2015	
The Evening School: The Return of the Enrolled (Večernja škola: Povratak upisanih)	Improvisational comedy	Željko Pervan	11 March 2005 – 12 May 2006	A spin off of the show The Evening School (1995–1998) which aired on the network OTV. The franchise would also expand with two more spin offs The Evening School: Internship and The Evening School: EU, which would air on the network Nova TV from 2005 until 2008. The title of the HRT series is a reference to the 1970s era Serbian television war drama The Written Offs (Otpisani), or, to be more precise, its sequel The Return of the Written Offs (Povratak otpisanih)
Sacred Mountains of the World (Svete planine svijeta)	Travel documentary	Stipe Božić	2005	Adapted into a non-fiction book of the same name in 2010 and published by the Profil publishing house
Survivor: The Island of Odysseus (Survivor: Odisejev otok)	Reality TV	Kristijan Potočki	12 May 2005 – 7 July 2005	Based on the American reality TV franchise Survivor, which is, of itself, an American take on the Swedish series Expedition Robinson. Survivor would eventually return to Croatian screens with a revival hosted on the network Nova TV
Deal or No Deal (Uzmi ili ostavi)	Competition	Željko Pervan	2005 - 2009	A Croatian reworking of the 2005 American competition show of the same name, which was in turn adapted from a Dutch series titled Postcode Loterĳ Miljoenenjacht
Geniuses (Genijalci)	Competition	Pjer Žardin	13 October 2005 – 30 June 2007	
Dancing with the Stars (Ples sa zvijezdama)	Competition	Barbara Kolar	2006 - 2013	Adapted from the British series Strictly Come Dancing. After concluding its run on HRT, the series would eventually be revived by Nova TV in 2019, where it would air until 2023. A reworking of the series for HRT is currently in production
Mad Emperors of Rome (Ludi rimski carevi)	Docudrama	Božidar Domagoj Burić	25 September 2006 – 16 October 2006	
Founders of Church Orders (Osnivači crkvenih redova)	Docudrama	Krešimir Čokolić, Ivica Dlesk	2007	
Pharos-Paros (Faros-Paros)	Travel documentary	Stipe Božić	2007	
I Can Change the World (Mijenjam svijet)	Documentary	Dana Budisavljević	2007	
Just the Two of Us (Zvijezde pjevaju)	Competition	Duško Ćurlić, Barbara Kolar	7 April 2007 – 31 December 2024	Croatian reworking of the British series of the same name
69	Talk show, improvisational comedy	Zlatan Zuhrić, Hrvoje Kečkeš	7 October 2007 – 29 March 2008	
Heroes of Vukovar	Historical documentary, war	Eduard Galić	2008	
1 Versus 100 (1 protiv 100)	Competition	Dalibor Sokolić	17 January 2008 – 26 June 2011	Based on the Dutch series Eén tegen 100 (1 vs. 100)
I Love Football (Volim nogomet)	Sports		21 September 2008 – 5 December 2009	
Behind Our Screens (Iza ekrana)	Talk show		2008-2015	
VIP Music Club LP	Music	Hamed Bangoura	14 May 2009 – 7 May 2010	
Heroes of the Croatian War of Independence (Junaci Domovinskog rata)	Historical documentary, war	Zdravko Fuček, Mladen Ćapin, Ninoslav Lovčević	20 January 2009 – 3 March 2009	
TV Kindergarten (TV Vrtić)	Children's television		2009 - 2012	
Rivers of Croatia (Rijeke Hrvatske)	Travel documentary	Goran Šafarek	2009	

2010s
Title	Genre	Number of seasons	Creator(s)	Original airdates	Notes
Hebrang	Historical documentary	1 (miniseries)	Branko Hebrang, Hrvoje Hitrec	2010	
Deserts of the World (Pustinje svijeta)	Travel documentary	1 (miniseries)	Stipe Božić	16 February 2010 – 20 April 2013	
Floor 8 (8. kat)	Talk show		Daniela Trbović	20 September 2010 – 18 June 2015	
Tito	Docudrama	1 (miniseries)	Antun Vrdoljak	19 October 2010 – 11 June 2010	
Call 112 (Nazovi 112)	Documentary	1 (miniseries)	Stipe Božić	April 6ht 2011 - 15 June 2011	
Adriatic Games (Jadranske igre)	Competition	1	Miroslav Krzyk	7 August 2011 – 9 September 2012	
Ground Zero (Nulta točka)	Talk show		Mislav Togonal	12 September 2012 – 9 September 2013	
Risking it All (Sve u 7)	Competition	2	Damir Hanžek	20 September 2011 – 23 October 2013	Croatian reworking of the American series of the same name, which was, in turn, based on the Dutch series Succes Verzekerd
Sing My Song (Pjevaj moju pjesmu)	Competition	1	Tihomir Žarn, Tanja Tušek, Vesna Karuza Podgorelec	25 September 2011 – 31 December 2012	
Reconstruction (Rekonstrukcija)	Talk show	1	Robert Knjaz	2012	
Kitsch (Kič)	Documentary	1 (miniseries)	Nana Šojlev	2012	
Yugoslavia's Secret Services (Jugoslavenske tajne službe)	Docudrama	1 (miniseries)	Miljenko Manjkas	2 April 2012 – 4 June 2012	
Easy Sunday (Nedjeljom lagano)	Sports		Mila Horvat	29 September 2013 - 2014	
Croatian Kings (Hrvatski kraljevi)	Docudrama	1 (miniseries)	Božidar Domagoj Burić	14 October 2011 – 25 November 2011	
Generation Y (Generacija Y)	Documentary	4	Ivana Šimić Sedić	10 September 2012 – 10 May 2018	
In Medias Res	Talk show	1	Petar Vlahov	2 December 2012 – 5 June 2012	
The Gardner (Vrtlarica)	Documentary	10	Kornelija Benyovsky Šoštarić	2012 - 2022	
The Colorful Time Machine (Šareni vremeplov)	Children's television	1		2013	
Krleža	Historical documentary	1 (miniseries)	Tomislav Sabljak	2013	
And That's Croatia For You (I to je Hrvatska)	Travel documentary	1	Robert Knjaz	2013	
County Panorama (Županijska panorama)	News			2013 - 2 May 2022	
In Search of Marco Polo (U potrazi za Markom Polom)	Historical documentary	1 (miniseries)	Miro Branković	13 February 2013 – 4 April 2013	
The Laboratory at the End of the Universe (Laboratorij na kraju svemira)	Children's television	2	Barbara Vekarić, Irena Krčelić	19 September 2013 - 12 March 2015	
Vedran's Greats (Vedranovi velikani)	Children's television, talk show	1	Vedran Limić	28 September 2013-14 December 2013	
The Third Element (Treći element)	Talk show	9		3 October 2013 – 3 October 2023	
Tijardović	Docudrama	1 (miniseries)	Željko Rogošić	6 November 2013-27 November 2013	
Dressing Room (Svlačionica)	Talk show	2	Robert Knjaz	2014	
Football Television (Nogometna televizija)	Sports	1	Robert Knjaz	2014	
Croatian Butterflies and Dragonflies (Hrvatski leptiri i vretenca)	Nature documentary	1 (miniseries)	Jadranka Cicvarić Šiftar	2014	
Unusual Flowers of Croatia (Neobični cvjetovi Hrvatske)	Nature documentary	1 (miniseries)	Jadranka Cicvarić Šiftar	2014	
World War One in Croatia (Hrvatska u Prvom svjetskom ratu)	Docudrama	1 (miniseries)	Krešimir Čokolić	2014	
Country Feast (Seoska gozba)	Cooking show	5		2014 - 2015	
Classics and People (Klasici narodu)	Documentary	2	Robert Knjaz	2014 - 2015	
Adam and Eve (Adam i Eva)	Documentary	1 (miniseries)	Nana Šojlev	29 December, 2014-19 January 2015	
Sweet Chef (Slatka kuharica)	Cooking show	2	Maja Pek - Brünjes	2015 - 2017	
The Way I Want (Bit će kako ja hoću)	Documentary	1	Jasmina Kallay	2015	
Food Markets: In the Belly of the city (Tržnice: Trbuh grada)	Documentary	1 (miniseries)	Dana Budisavljević, Stefano Taldi	2015	A coproduction between HRT, the Italian national network RAI and the Swiss national network RSI
The Longest Day (Najduži dan)	Documentary	1 (miniseries)	Nebojša Taraba, Miodrag Sila	2015	
The Herbs Hunter (Lovac na bilje)	Travel documentary, nature documentary	3	Anton Rudan, Filip Filković	9 January 2016 - 2021	
Evening Lectures (Večernja škola)	Entertainment	1	Robert Knjaz	10 March 2016 – 19 May 2016	
Self-portraits of Our Viewers (Autoportreti gledatelja)	Talk show	1	Robert Knjaz	14 March 2016 - 2017	
The Republic: A History of Dubrovnik (Republika)	Docudrama	1 (miniseries)	Božidar Domagoj Burić	18 April 2016 – 23 May 2016	
Topic of the Day (Tema dana)	News	2		19 September 2016 – 20 September 2020	
Residential Concerns (Stambeno pitanje)	Documentary	1 (miniseries)	Silvana Menđušić	2016	
Defending Croatia (Kako je obranjena Hrvatska)	Historical documentary, war	1 (miniseries)	Tomislav Šulj, Zoran Magretić	6 October 2016 – 22 December 2016	
CSI: Croatia (CSI: Hrvatska)	True crime	1 (miniseries)	Velimir Grgić	10 October 2016 – 12 December 2016	
Concrete Sleepers (Betonski spavači)	Documentary	3	Saša Ban	2016	Each season of the show ran with a specific caption that encompassed its theme. Season one was thus titled The Lost Arcadia (Izgubljena Arkadija), season two Unfinished Modernizations (Nedovršene modernizacije) and season three The Third Time (Treći put)
Quickography (Brzografija)	Documentary	1 (miniseries)	Višnja Skorin	2016	
Tales of the Wind (Sjeverozapadni vjetar: Između legende i stvarnosti)	Documentary	1 (miniseries)	Zdenko Bašić	2016 -2017	Based on the non-fiction books Tales of the Wind and Moon's Shadows by Zdenko Bašić
Croatian Greats (Hrvatski velikani)	Historical documentary	2	Robert Knjaz	2016 - 2017	
Children of the Mediterranean (Djeca Mediterana)	Documentary	2	Lana Šarić	26 July 2017 – 6 September 2020	
Tin: A Thirty Year Voyage (Tin: Trideset godina putovanja)	Docudrama	1 (miniseries)	Davor Žmegač	22 October 2017 – 12 November 2017	Based on the non-fiction book of the same name by Jasen Bok and coproduced between HRT, the Serbian national network RTS and the Bosnian national network BHRT
The War Before the War (Rat prije rata)	Docudrama	1 (miniseries)	Miljenko Manjkas, Silvio Jesenković	2018	
Life in a Day (Život u jednom danu)	Documentary	1 (miniseries)	Snježana Samac	2018	
Marko Antun de Dominis	Docudrama	1 (miniseries)	Niko Kostanić	3 January 2018– 15 January 2018	
Professions Up Close and Personal (Profesije osobno)	Documentary	5	Goran Bukovčan	1 March 2018-13 July 2019	
Stop in Lika (Stani u Lici)	Travel documentary	1 (miniseries)	Andrea Buča	14 November 2018 – 16 March 2019	The first installment in Buča's Stop in... franchise
Fridays with Daniela (5. com s Danielom)	Talk show	4	Daniela Trbović	4 October 2019 – 16 June 2023	
Survival (Opstanak)	Documentary	2	Dubravko Merlić	2 December 2019 – 24 May 2021	

2020s
Title	Genre	Number of seasons	Creator(s)	Original airdates	Notes
The President (Predsjednik)	Docudrama	1 (miniseries)	Gordan Malić, Miljenko Malkas	20 January 2020 – 23 March 2020	
Stop in Zagorje (Stani v Zagorju)	Travel documentary	1 (miniseries)	Andrea Buča	16 March 2020 – 10 May 2020	The second installment in Buča's Stop in... franchise
What's Up America	Travel documentary	1 (miniseries)	Goran Milić	18 January 2021 – 15 February 2021	The first installment in Milić's What's Up franchise
Age of the Uskoks (Doba uskoka)	Docudrama	1 (miniseries)	Božidar Domagoj Burić	13 May 2021 – 4 June 2021	
World's Greatest Celebrations (Najveće svjetske fešte)	Travel documentary	2	Robert Knjaz	22 May 2022 – 14 August 2022	
The Craft (Zanat)	Documentary	1 (miniseries)	Filip Filković	1 September 2021 – 17 November 2021	
The ISC (NDH)	Historical documentary, war	1 (miniseries)	Hrvoje Klasić	20 September 2021 – 6 December 2021	
1991: The Start, the Turn, the Victory (1991.: Početak, obrat, pobjeda)	Historical documentary, war	1 (miniseries)	Borna Marinić	23 December 2023-6 January 2024	
Charge! (U boj! U boj!)	Docudrama	1 (miniseries)	Dušan Bućan, Danijel Pek	2021 - 2022	
Weekend Getaway (Kamo za vikend?)	Travel documentary	1 (miniseries)	Dušan Bućan, Perica Matijević, Danijel Pek	2021 - 2022	
On the Road: Riding to the Black Sea (Na putu: Konjima do Crnog mora)	Travel documentary	1 (miniseries)	Dušan Bućan, Boris Veličan	2021- 2022	
The One and Only (Jedna jedina)	Documentary	1 (miniseries)	Dubravko Merlić	3 January 2022 – 18 January 2022	
Emotions (Osjećaji)	Documentary	1 (miniseries)	Robert Knjaz	16 January 2022 – 20 February 2022	
What's Up Paris, London, Berlin?	Travel documentary	1 (miniseries)	Goran Milić	7 February 2022-28 March 2022	The second installment in Milić's What's Up franchise
Stories of Rijeka (Riječke priče)	Historical documentary	1 (miniseries)	Ivica Dlesk	8 February 2022 – 12 February 2022	
Stop on an Island (Stani na otoku)	Travel documentary	1 (miniseries)	Andrea Buča	19 September 2022 – 9 November 2022	The third installment in Buča's Stop in... franchise
Man and Space (Čovjek i prostor)	Documentary	1 (miniseries)	Nikola Škarić, Vedran Duplančić, Sabina Sabljić	19 September 2022 – 13 December 2022	
Food as Medicine (Hrana kao lijek)	Documentary	1 (miniseries)	Jasna Burić	2 November 2022 – 12 November 2022	
Knjaz and the Blazers (Knjaz kod Vatrenih)	Sports	2	Robert Knjaz	23 November 2022 – 10 June 2024	
As Smart as a Crow, As Brave as a Hedgehog (Pametan kao vrana, hrabar kao jež)	Nature documentary	1 (miniseries)	Robert Knjaz	3 January 2023 – 25 February 2023	
The Diplomatic Storm (Diplomatska oluja)	Historical documentary, war	1 (miniseries)	Kristijan Milić	2 February 2023 – 23 March 2023	Based on the non-fiction book of the same name by Mate Granić
What's Up Israel	Travel documentary	1 (miniseries)	Goran Milić	13 February 2023 – 20 March 2023	The third installment in Milić's What's Up franchise
Windy (Vjetrovito)	Documentary	1 (miniseries)	Vlatka Vorkapić	2 May 2023 – 16 May 2023	
The Forgotten Battles of the Croatian War of Independance (Nepoznate bitke Domovinskog rata)	Historical documentary, war	1 (miniseries)	Ivana Cigić	15 July 2023-29 July 2023	
Knjaz's Theatre (Knjazalište)	Documentary	1 (miniseries)	Robert Knjaz	2 October 2023 – 4 December 2023	
Happy Cities (Sretni gradovi)	Travel documentary	2	Martina Validžić	3 October 2023-17 December 2024	
David Skoko's Bike, Wine and Spatula (David Skoko: Motor, loza, kuhača)	Travel documentary	1 (miniseries)	Inja Korać	4 October 2023 – 29 November 2023	
Kurnati: An Alphabet of Memory (Kurnati: Abeceda sjećanja)	Historical documentary	1 (miniseries)	Vladimir Skračić	8 October 2023-February 4, 2025	
Classical Music in Everday Life (Klasična glazba za svaki dan)	Documentary	1 (miniseries)	Borko Perić	23 January 2024 – 27 February 2024	
Bon Voyage (Sretan put)	Documentary	1 (miniseries)	Sandra Basso	24 January 2024 – 28 February 2024	
What's Up North and South (What's up Sjever jug)	Travel documentary	1 (miniseries)	Goran Milić	12 February 2024 – 1 April 2024	The fourth installment in Millić's What's Up franchise
The Wild ZOOne (Divlja ZOOna)	Documentary	1 (miniseries)	Maja Fišter	3 March 2024-14 April 2024	
A Return to the Animals (Povratak životinjama)	Nature documentary	1 (miniseries)	Filip Filković	21 April 2024 – 7 June 2024	
Conversations with Friends (Razgovori s prijateljima)	Documentary	1 (miniseries)	Gordana Glibo	24 April 2023 - 12 May 2023	
Garbage and Me (Smeće i ja)	Documentary	1 (miniseries)	Vlatka Vorkapić	2 May 2024 – 16 May 2024	
Lost Cities (Izgubljeni gradovi)	Historical documentary	1 (miniseries)	Ivica Radoš	2 May 2024 – 9 May 2024	
As Smart as a Chicken, As Stubborn as an Ass (Pametan kao kokoš, tvrdoglav kao magarac)	Nature documentary	1 (miniseries)	Robert Knjaz	17 May 2024 – 5 June 2024	
Give Me a Home (Udomi me)	Documentary	1 (miniseries)	Maja Fišter	30 June 2024-18 August 2024	
What's Up Japan	Travel documentary	1 (miniseries)	Goran Milić	30 September 2024-4 November 2024	The fifth installment in Milić's What's Up franchise
Europe's Most Beautiful Villages (Najljepša europska sela)	Travel documentary	1 (miniseries)	Robert Knjaz	1 October 2024 – 5 November 2024	
A Record of the Seas (Plovopis)	Travel documentary	1 (miniseries)	Dubravko Merlić	2 October 2024 – 23 October 2024	
The Party (Partija)	Historical documentary	1 (miniseries)	Gordan Malić	3 October 2024 – 31 October 2024	
A Dalmatian Meal (Dalmatinska marenda)	Documentary	1 (miniseries)	Tamara Babun Zovko	23 October 2024 – 31 October 2024	
On the Highway (Na magistrali)	Travel documentary	1 (miniseries)	Andrea Buča	27 October 2024 – 2 December 2024	The fourth installment in Buča's Stop in... franchise
Markets (Pijaca, pazar, plac)	Documentary	1 (miniseries)	Nebojša Slijepčević	6 January 2025 – 10 February 2025	
Croatian Dreamers (Sanjari Hrvatske)	Docudrama	1 (miniseries)	Mirela Sakoman, Senad Zemunović	14 January 2025 – 28 January 2025	
An Unpleasant Truth (Prst u oko)	Documentary	1 (miniseries)	Daniel Bilić	22 January 2025 – 26 February 2025	
The League of Hvar (Forska liga)	Documentary, sports	1 (miniseries)	Haris Kozarić	28 January 2025 – 18 February 2025	
Beyond Croatia (Oči sokolove)	Travel documentary	1 (miniseries)	Tea Matanović	28 January 2025-April 1, 2025	
Do we Know What We Eat?: A History of Our Meals (Znamo li što jedemo?: Povijest i sadašnjost naših obroka)	Historical documentary	2	Robert Knjaz	17 February 2025-30 March 2026	
Graffiti (Graffiti)	Documentary	1 (miniseries)	Luka Tokić	8 April 2025-May 5, 2025	
Five Star Pet Doctors (Doktor za pet)	Documentary	1 (miniseries)	Senad Zemunović	8 April 2025-May 5, 2025	
Don't Forget To Leave a Review (Ne zaboravite ostaviti recenziju)	Travel documentary	1 (miniseries)	Rea Rajčić, Ivan Grgur	30 September 2025 – 18 November 2025	
Police Stories (Policijske priče)	True crime, docudrama	1 (miniseries)	Hrvoje Mabić, Jadranka Cicvarić Šiftar	30 September 2025 – 4 November 2025	
The Diary of the Nomads (Dnevnik nomada)	Travel documentary, historical documentary	1 (miniseries)	Kristijan Iličić	1 October 2025 – 22 October 2025	
David Skoko's A Place For Me (David Skoko: Mjesto za mene)	Travel documentary	1 (miniseries)	Inja Korać	29 October 2025-17 December 2025	
Appetizing (Apetitlih)	Historical documentary, travel documentary	1 (miniseries)	Goran Ribarić	23 November 2025-28 December 2025	
The Barbers of TV (Serijski brijači)	Travel documentary	1 (miniseries)	Martina Validžić	24 November 2025-15 December 2025	
As Fast As It Can Go (Brže ne može)	Travel documentary	1 (miniseries)	Andrea Buča	25 November 2025-14 December 2025	The fifth installment in Buča's Stop In... franchise
Stagelights (Svjetla pozornice)	Historical documentary	1 (miniseries)	Matej Merlić, Dubravko Merlić	25 November 2025-6 January 2026	
Croatia is Always Within Us: Croats in Argentina (Hrvatska je uvijek u nama: Hrvati u Argentini)	Historical documentary	1 (miniseries)	Cristian Šprljan	8 December 2025-10 January 2026	
What's Up China (What's Up Kina)	Travel documentary	1 (miniseries)	Goran Milić	22 December 2025-9 February 2026	The sixth installment in Milić's What's Up franchise
The Last (Posljednji)	Travel documentary	1 (miniseries)	Davor Rostuhar	13 January 2026-3 February 2026	
Back Window (Pogled u dvorište)	Documentary	1 (miniseries)	Ljiljana Hrstić Borić	10 February 2026-10 March 2026	
Far and Near (Daljine i blizine)	Travel documentary	1 (miniseries)	Mario Papić	18 February 2026-11 March 2026	
New Faces of Labour (Nova lica rada)	Documentary	1 (miniseries)	Filip Peruzović	1 April 2026-6 May 2026	
At the End of the Day (Na kraju krajeva)	Documentary	1 (miniseries)	Petar Varat	14 April 2026-26 May 2026	
Where Did It All Go? Or Did It? (Gdje je nestalo? Ili nije?)	Historical documentary	1 (miniseries)	Robert Knjaz	20 April 2026-25 May 2026	
Love (Ljubav)	Documentary	1 (miniseries)	Karolina Lisak Vidović, Tihana Ramirez Ruiz	18 May 2026-1 June 2026	

Current programming (unscripted and documentaries)
Title	Genre	Creator(s)	Start of airing	Notes
Fruits of Our Labour (Plodovi zemlje)	News	Ružica Trauber	21 December 1958	
Dnevnik HRT	News	Ružica Venić Andrijanić	1 October 1968	
TV Calendar (TV Kalendar)	Historical documentary	Obrad Kosovac, Vladimir Fučijaš	1976	
The Sea (More)	News	Branislav Bimbašić	1982	Originally titled The People, The Sea, The Coast (Ljudi, more, obala)
Alps, Danube and Sea (Alpe Dunav Jadran)	News	Günther Ziesel	1982	A joint project between Croatia, Italy, Slovenia, Germany and Hungary
House Pets (Kućni ljubimci)	Talk show	Antun Ponoš	1990	Originally titled Saved Me (Pomozi mi)
Croatia Today (Hrvatska danas)	News	Assorted Croatian news anchors	1990	
Regional News Broadcast (Regionalni dnevnik)	News	Ana Jelinić		
Good Morning, Croatia (Dobro jutro, Hrvatska)	Talk show	Marija Nemčić	27 April 1992	
Sundays at Two (Nedjeljom u dva)	Talk show	Aleksandar Stanković	8 October 2000	
Who Wants to Be a Millionaire? (Tko želi biti milijunaš?)	Competition	Mladen Šimunov	24 March 2002	Croatian version of the British series of the same name
On the Fringes of Science (Na rubu znanosti)	Talk show	Krešimir Mišak, Božidar Domagoj Burić	7 October 2002	
Special Features (Posebni dodaci)	Talk show	Dean Šoša	2008	
The Fifth Day (Peti dan)	Talk show	Milana Vuković Runjić	2009	
Labyrinth (Labirint)	Documentary, investigative journalism	Jagoda Bastalić	10 September 2012	
I Love Croatia (Volim Hrvatsku)	Competition	Alen Đurica	23 September 2012	Based on the Dutch series I Love My Country (Ik hou van Holland)
The Chase (Potjera)	Competition	Damir Hanžek	27 October 2013	Based on the British series of the same name. Airs colloquially with its sister series Superpotjera (Superchase) which is based on Beat the Chasers
Voice of Croatia (Vijesti na engleskom jeziku)	News	Katja Milčić	2013	
Veterans of Peace (Veterani mira)	Talk show		2013	
Peace and Kindness (Mir i dobro)	Talk show		2013	
Garage (Garaža)	Music		2013	
Positive (Pozitivno)	News		2013	
Studio 4	News		2014	
The Voice Croatia	Competition	Ivan Šulentić	17 January 2015	Based on the Dutch series The Voice of Holland. Was originally titled The Voice: Croatia's Most Beautiful Voice (The Voice: Najljepši glas Hrvatske)
Composers Firever/Songwriters Forever (Zauvijek skladatelj/Zauvijek autor)	Music, documentary	Toni Volarić	5 October 2017	The first season of the series was entitled Composers Forever and focused on famous composers of the contemporary Croatian music scene. However, in 2017, the project abruptly changed its name to Songwriters Forever and switched its focus. Despite this change, Volarić and HRT insisted that it's merely a new format of the same series rather than a separate project
At Our Home (Kod nas doma)	Talk show	Elizabeta Bločina	18 September 2017	
Prometheus (Prometej)	Talk show	Jasna Burić		
Disclosure (Razotkrivanje)	Documentary	Hana Gelb	24 January 2018	
The Amarcord of a Varoš (Varoški Amardcord)	Historical documentary	Ivan Živković	16 September 2018	
A Piece of Land (Dulum zemlje)	Documentary	Tamara Wolfgang	9 May 2021	
The Dr Beck Show (Dr. Beck)	Talk show	Natko Beck	26 September 2022	
The Golden League (Zlatna liga)	Talk show	Mladen Šimunov	4 October 2022	
Hunter Gatherer (Lovac sakupljač)	Historical documentary	Neda Radić	27 October 2022	
Superchase (Superpotjera)	Competition	Danko Volarić	26 March 2023	
Frame Zero (Nulti kadar)	Documentary	Hrvoje Ivanković	2 September 2023	
Book Club (Klub čitatelja)	Talk show	Vlatka Kolarović, Dejan Šoša, Dražen Ilinčić	4 October 2023	
Mountains (Planine)	Travel documentary	Maja Tokić, Nataša Kraljević Kolbas	4 October 2023	
Dogs with a Cause (Psi na zadatku)	Documentary	Petar Vukičević	22 April 2024	
Our Little Festivities (Naše male fešte)	Documentary	Goran Ribarić	27 October 2024	
Call of the Wild (Zov divljine)	Documentary	Siniša Hajduk	14 November 2023	
A Year to Remember (Godina za pamćenje)	Competition	Vlado Knežević	31 December 2023	Based on the Dutch series Oh, what een jaar!
My Way (Moj put)	Documentary	Silvija Trnčević	16 September 2024	
Conversations with a Point (Razgovor s razlogom)	Talk show	Morana Kaspović	2 December 2024	
The Voice Kids Croatia (The Voice Kids Hrvatska)	Competition	Katja Miličić	28 December 2024	
Good Economy (Dobra ekonomija)	Documentary	Đuro Gavran	6 March 2025	
Small People, Big Stories (Velike priče, Mali ljudi)	Documentary	Nensi Profaca	1 April 2025	
Winners (Pobjednici)	Documentary	Ida Prester	14 April 2025	
David Skoko's Eating on the Road (David Skoko: Jesti na cesti)	Travel documentary	Inja Korać	28 April 2025	
Croatian Stories (Priče iz Hrvatske)	Documentary	Klaudia Kežić Mrkonjić	16 September 2025	
My Choice (Moj izbor)	Documentary	Željkica Lozo	24 November 2025	
The Night Shift (Noćna smjena)	Documentary	Ida Slavić	5 August 2026	
Perfect Places with Saša Šekoranja (Savršena mjesta sa Sašom Šekoranjom)	Travel documentary	Saša Šekoranja, Ana Šerić, Vanja Marković	28 September 2026	
Under the Radar (Ispod radara)	Travel documentary, historical documentary	Mihovil Pirnat	28 September 2026	
Car Goes Vroom (Ide auto)	Historical documentary	Tomislav Cvitan, Rene Gallo	29 September 2026	
My Album (Moj album)	Historical documentary	Robert Knjaz	29 September 2026	
Knjaz Travels Through HRT (Putoknjaz)	Historical documentary	Robert Knjaz	1 October 2026	
Together Again (Ponovno zajedno)	Talk show	Daniela Trbović	8 October 2026	
Kunstdetektiv	Historical documentary	Sara Hribar	26 October 2026	

Upcoming programming (unscripted and documentaries)
Title	Genre	Creator(s)	Release date	Notes
History on the Plate (Povijest svježe servirana)	Historical documentary	Marko Gajski	16 November 2026	
School Kitchen (Školska kuhinja)	Documentary	Maja Fišter, Tomislav Mršić	30 November 2026	
The First Citizen of Split (Prvi Splićanin)	Docudrama	Božidar Domagoj Burić	2026	The series will be preceded by the theatrical scripted narrative feature film titled Diocles (Dioklecijan) constructed out of the strung together scripted live-action sequences filmed for it
G-l-i-t-c-h	Documentary	Filip Filković	TBA	
Where Love Is (A gdje je ljubav)	Travel documentary	Ella Mische	TBA	
The Government of Democratic Unity (Vlada demokratskog jedinstva)	Historical documentary, war	Currently uncredited	TBA	
People, Objects and Spaces (Ljudi, predmeti i prostori)	Documentary	Maroje Mrduljaš	TBA	
Food 2.0: The Future on the Plate (Hrana 2.0: Budućnost na tanjuru)	Documentary	Currently uncredited	TBA	
Corners of the World (Strane svijeta)	Travel documentary	Currently uncredited	TBA	
Echo Sport (Eho sport)	Documentary	Currently uncredited	TBA	
Wild Croatia (Divlja Hrvatska)	Nature documentary	Danijel Pek, Filip Filković	TBA	
