= Medveščak =

Medveščak may refer to:

- Gornji Grad – Medveščak, city district in Zagreb, Croatia
- Medveščak (stream), a historic creek in central Zagreb, today running underground in the aforementioned city district
- Medveščak (neighborhood), a neighborhood in the aforementioned city district
- RK Medveščak, a handball club based in Zagreb
- KHL Medveščak Zagreb, an ice hockey club based in Zagreb
