= Luka Juričić =

Luka Juričić may refer to:

- Luka Juričić (actor)
- Luka Juričić (footballer)
