= Šverceri hlapić =

- Directed by: Luka Juričić; Borko Perić
- Produced by: DS INK; TV Nova
- Starring: Jadranka Đokić; Matija Ferlin; Marko Juraga; Luka Juričić; Borko Perić; Romina Vitasović
- Cinematography: Luka Juričić
- Edited by: Dino Geromella
- Music by: Matija Ferlin, Siniša Majstorović
- Release date: 22 October 1999
- Country: Croatia
- Language: Croatian

Šverceri hlapić is a 1999 film produced by Nova TV and directed by Luka Juričić and Borko Perić. The film is best known for the acting debuts of Jadranka Đokić and Luka Juričić, who was also the film's director. The film premiered at the Istrian National Theater on 22 October 1999.

== Cast ==
- Jadranka Đokić - Nataša Mrlek
- Luka Juričić - Don Pancettone
- Elvira - Miss Shoe
- Matija Ferlin - pomoćnik Miss Shoe
- Marko Juraga - Hlapić 2
- Siniša Majstorović - Kriminalac
- Samanta Milotić - Gita
- Martina Orlić - Sporedan lik
- Milan Peranović - Prodavac kremica
- Borko Perić - Hlapić 1
- Romina Vitasović - Lily Picek
