= Načinović =

Načinović is a surname. The Croatian census of 2011 listed it as one of the most common surnames in Sveta Nedelja, Istria, Kršan, and Labin.

Notable people with the surname include:

- Daniel Načinović, a Croatian poet and journalist
- Alvaro Načinović, a Croatian handball player
- Veron Načinović, a Croatian handball player
