= Ponovno zajedno =

- Genre: talk show
- Inspired by: Programs broadcast by HRT
- Written by: Dorijan Klarić
- Directed by: Mladen Dizdar
- Presented by: Daniela Trbović
- Country of origin: Croatia
- Original language: Croatian
- No. of seasons: 1
- No. of episodes: 2

Production
- Running time: 60 minutes
- Production company: Croatian Radiotelevision

Original release
- Network: HRT 1
- Release: 8 October 2026 – present

Ponovno zajedno (Croatian for 'Together Again') is a Croatian talk show television series produced by Croatian Radiotelevision (HRT). Created to celebrate 100 years of Croatian public broadcasting, each episode revisits one of HRT's most memorable television programs and reunites the actors, hosts, creators, and other key figures behind its success.

Hosted by Danijela Trbović, the series premiered on 8 October 2026 on HRT 1. It is set to consist of 11 episodes.

== Episodes ==
No.	Title	Original release date
1	"Bitange i princeze"	8 October 2026
The episode reunites the cast of HRT's 2005–2010 sitcom television series Bitange i princeze.: Guests: Rene Bitorajac, Tarik Filipović, Nataša Dangubić, Mile Kekin, and Dražen Čuček
2	"Sedma noć"	15 October 2026
The episode reunites the hosts of the HRT's musical series Sedma noć.: Guests: Vlatka Pokos, Mirko Fodor, Ksenija Urličić
3	"Mala zemlja za velike dočeke"	22 October 2026
Croatian athletes and sports commentators reunite to reflect on memorable sporting victories and celebrations.: Guests: Zvonimir Boban, Dražen Ladić, Vlado Šola, Božo Sušec, Mićo Dušanović, and Marko Šapit
