= Vlatka Pokos =

Croatian singer and television host (born 1970)

- Born: 22 March 1970 (age 56); Salzburg, Austria
- Occupations: Singer; television host

Vlatka Pokos (born 22 March 1970) is a Croatian jet setter, former singer and former television host. Due to her controversial lifestyle and up-and-down entertainment career, Vlatka was a subject of constant media attention. Most recently, she is notable for her outspoken political and social views.

== Early life ==
Vlatka Pokos was born on 22 March 1970 in Salzburg, Austria. After graduating from high school, she moved to Zagreb.

== Career ==
She started her singing career in late 1980s with the band Srebrna Krila where she was credited for two albums that achieved notable success. In the early 1990s, she became a television host for two major Sunday night television shows (Bravo and Sedma noć) on the Croatian national broadcaster HRT. In the summer of 1995, Pokos launched her only solo hit titled "Petak" (Friday). In 1999 and 2000, she co-hosted Dora, the Croatian national final for Eurovision Song Contest.

Pokos made her acting debut as a guest in an episode of the 2007 comedy television series Zauvijek susjedi on Nova TV. She returned to the network in 2022 to participante in Nova TV's second season of Ples sa zvijezdama, a Croatian iteration of Strictly Come Dancing, where she was eliminated first.

In 2026, Pokos was a guest on HRT's talk show television series Ponovno zajedno in an episode dedicated to the cultural impact of Sedma noć.

== Controversies ==
In June 2007, her marriage with Josip Radeljak abruptly ended when he kicked her out of their apartment. A fierce media battle between the two ensued, with Radeljak tossing his wedding ring in Croatian prime-time television show Otvoreno on HRT, and accusing Vlatka of physically abusing his daughter Lana. Vlatka then accused him of "treating her worse than his domestic helpers." In September 2007, Pokos had a guest role in comedy television series Zauvijek susjedi, but tried to stop the broadcast of the episode as she believed her character on the show and the character's nickname "Dekanica" was a parody of her real-life marriage; Pokos claimed she was not given then entire script for the episode upon filming.

In 2010, Pokos published a book titled Život u raju (English: Life in Heaven), which, although it was criticized as simplistic and banal, received a lot of media attention. Radoljak's new wife, Dolores Lambaša, started participating in the media battle with Pokos after announcing her book called Život u paklu (English: Life in Hell), which was to document alleged abuses over Radeljak's daughter Lana who Vlatka allegedly mistreated.

== Filmography ==
=== Television ===
| Year | Title | Role | Notes |
|---|---|---|---|
| 1999 | Dora 1999 | Herself | Host, with Oliver Mlakar |
| 2000 | Dora 2000 | Herself | Host, with Marko Rašica |
| 2007 | Zauvijek susjedi | Sofija Frajt | 1 episode |
| 2007 | Nad lipom 35 | Herself | |
| 2022 | Ples sa zvijezdama | Herself | Nova TV's season 2 contestant |
| 2026 | Ponovno zajedno | Herself | Episode "Sedma noć" |
