= Jadranka Đokić =

Croatian actress (born 1981)

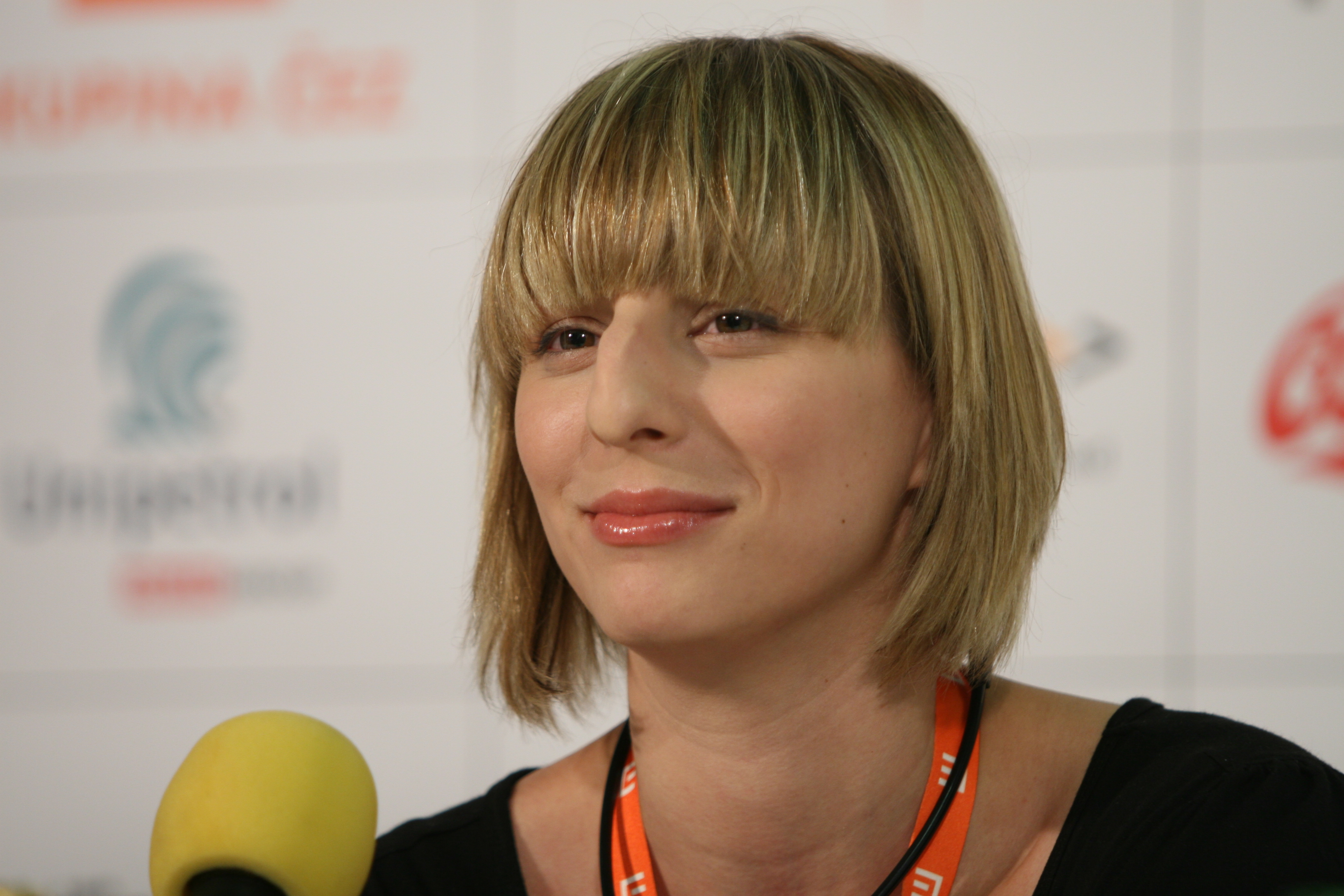
- Đokić at the Karlovy Vary International Film Festival, in 2008
- Born: 14 January 1981 (age 45); Pula, SR Croatia, SFR Yugoslavia (now Croatia)
- Occupation: Actress
- Years active: 1999–present
- Awards: Golden Arena for Best Actress; 2008—Behind the Glass

Jadranka Đokić (born 14 January 1981) is a Croatian actress. One of the top Croatian actresses, she has won critical approval for her theatre, film and television performances.

Her notable film roles include starring in Fine Dead Girls, Sorry for Kung Fu, Behind the Glass, Storm, Metastases and The Priest's Children. For her performance in Behind the Glass, she won the 2008 Golden Arena for Best Actress. In television, she gained massive mainstream TV fame for her lead roles as nurse Helga in Naša mala klinika, Verica in Luda kuća, herself in Moja 3 zida and Lili in Ko te šiša. She was also lauded for her award-winning performances in HNK Zagreb, including King Lear, Tartuffe, A Winter's Tale, Uncle Vanya, Svaki tvoj rođendan and The Idiot. Đokić voiced Terk in the Croatian dub of Tarzan.

== Early life ==
Đokić was born in Pula on 14 January 1981. She was born to Croatian parents of Bosnian descent, and raised in the neighbourhood of Šijana, near the Pula Arena. In Pula, she finished primary school and gymnasium. She was a theatre fan in her teenage years. Đokić graduated from the Academy of Dramatic Art, University of Zagreb, from which she earned a Master of Fine Arts Degree.

== Career ==
=== Theatre ===
Đokić started her career in drama studio INK Pula. She was mentored by Robert Raponja and mostly performed Shakespearean plays, including Othello, Timon of Athens, Hamlet and Cymbeline. After entering the Academy of Dramatic Art, University of Zagreb, she achieved her first professional engagement in Spring Awakening, directed by Ozren Prohić.

In 2011, she won the Croatian Theatre Award for Best Actress for her performance in Ovo bi mogla biti moja ulica. She starred alongside Suzana Nikolić and Nataša Dorčić in the production, and it was presented in Zagreb, Rome, Prague and Berlin.

In 2018, she performed as Cordelia in the HNK Zagreb production of King Lear, with Predrag Miki Manojlović portraying the title king.

The 2019 premier of The Idiot saw Đokić as Nastasya Filippovna. For the Vasilij Senin-directed performance she received immense admiration among critics winning a Vladimir Nazor Award for excellence in theatre and a Croatian Actor Award for Best Actress in a Leading Role.

=== Television ===
To television audiences, she known for her role as nurse Helga in comedy series Naša mala klinika. From 2004 to 2009, Naša mala klinika was the most watched television series in Croatia. Večernji list proclaimed her as the best actress in a comedy series, awarding her with two Večernji List Screen Awards for Best Actress in a Comedy Series, in 2007 and 2008. Prominent Balkan film critics, including Milivoj Jukić and Dalibor Rajić praised her character delivery and comedic timing, and her eccentric, emotionally vulnerable and optimistic character is considered to be the show's breakout character. The same year, she became a member of the ensemble ZKM.

Other than nurse Helga, her repertoire on television includes being the main part of the ensemble cast of three other long-running Croatian sitcoms, being Luda kuća, Moja 3 zida and Ko te šiša. From 2009 to 2011, he starred alongside actor Ozren Grabarić in the popular sitcom series Moja 3 zida, which was filmed in her own apartment. For Ko te šiša, the most watched Croatian comedy series from 2016 to 2019, she received critical and commercial exaltation for her performance as hairdresser Lili.

She appeared in Kada zvoni? as Gabrijela, and played the supporting role of Ruža in the children's television show Žutokljunac.

=== Film ===
Đokić made her acting debut in the 1999 film Šverceri hlapić directed by fellow Pula native Luka Juričić, who also made his debut in this movie, as supporting Nataša Malek. Her first critically defined role was in Fine Dead Girls, directed by Dalibor Matanić, followed by the role of Zorica in the Ognjen Sviličić-directed drama film Sorry for Kung Fu.

She played the protagonist, Klara in the 2007 independent film Pusti me da spavam, directed by Sara Hribar. She amassed greater success in the film Behind the Glass, for which she won a Golden Arena for Best Actress, the Croatian equivalent of the Academy Award for Best Actress. Her performance in Behind the Glass is widely regarded as one of the greatest female performances in Croatian film history.

In 2009, she played the abused wife of lead character Krpa, played by Rene Bitorajac in the Golden Arena-winning film Metastases. She also starred in Storm, and her acting was praised by American critic and poet Stephen Holden.

In 2012, she has done voice-work for the animated film Inspector Martin and the Gang of Snails. She is prominent within Croatian-language dubbings, including dubs in The Lion King, the Kung Fu Panda franchise, the Tarzan films and The Incredibles.

In 2013, Đokić was cast to play the pregnant island native Ana in the Vinko Brešan film The Priest's Children. The film was a massive success, having the best opening week, in Croatian standards, since the country's independence in 1991.

=== Other work ===
She appeared in three HPB commercials and in the "Uvik kontra" music video by hip-hop recording act The Beat Fleet, on behalf of the short-lived Sara Hribar series Glasnogovornici.

She is actor and docent Nikša Butijer's assistant at the Academy of Dramatic Art, University of Zagreb.

=== Accolades ===
In 2010, the journal Globus proclaimed her as one of the leaders of Croatian film, taking the title of one of the most talented and engaged actresses together with Daria Lorenci, Zrinka Cvitešić, Leona Paraminski, Nataša Janjić and Marija Škaričić.

She has won five Croatian Theatre Awards for Best Actress, a Golden Arena for Best Actress, five Golden Laugh Awards, two Večernji List Screen Awards, three Grand Prix Jury Awards and two Fabijan Šovagović Awards, a Veljko Marčić Award, a Vladimir Nazor Award and a Mila Dimitrijević Award during her two decade long career.

She was named actress of the year by Teatar.hr two times, winning the award in 2013 and 2015.

== Personal life ==
Đokić is an avid reader, and enjoys the bibliographies of Ivan Vidić, Marguerite Duras, Jean Racine, Sylvia Plath, Fyodor Dostoyevski and Danijel Dragojević. She resides in Zagreb.

== Filmography ==
=== Film roles ===
Year	Title	Role	Notes
1999	Šverceri hlapić	Nataša Mrlek	Supporting role
2002	Fine Dead Girls	Lidija	Main role
2004	Sorry for Kung Fu	Zorica	Supporting role
2007	Pusti me da spavam	Klara	Main role
2008	Behind the Glass	Maja Jeren	Main role Golden Arena for Best Actress
2009	Storm	Belma Šulić	Main role
2009	Metastases	Krpa's wife	Main role
2010	Izgubljeni snovi	Julija	Main role
2012	Drugi	Vinka	Main role
2012	Night Boats	Hairdresser	Supporting role
2012	Zagrebačke priče vol. 2	Jelena	Main role
2012	Inspector Martin and the Gang of Snails	Ivna	Voice; Supporting role
2013	The Priest's Children	Ana	Main role
2016	Transmania	Manja	Main role
2019	Sam samcat	Dubravka	Main role

=== Television roles ===
Year	Title	Role	Notes
2005	Kad zvoni?	Gracijela	3 episodes
2005	Žutokljunac	Ružica	Supporting role; 14 episodes
2004–2007	Naša mala klinika	Nurse Helga	Main role; 112 episodes Večernji List Screen Award for Best Actress in a Comedy Series (2007, 2008)
2008	Bitange i princeze	Porno actress	2 episodes
2006–2009	Luda kuća	Verica Hohnjec	Main role; 132 episodes
2009	Bračne vode	Marica Kumarica	Main role; 94 episodes
2009–2013	Moja 3 zida	Jadranka	Main role; 20 episodes
2017–2020	Ko te šiša	Lili	Main role; 60 episodes

=== Croatian dubs ===
Year	Title	Role
2003	Hercules	Megara
2003	Balto III: Wings of Change	Dipsy
2003	Sinbad: Legend of the Seven Seas	Marina
2004	Shark Tale	Lola
2004	The Lion King	Shenzi
2004	The Incredibles	Mirage
2004	Tarzan	Terk
2005	Tarzan 2	Terk
2005	Chicken Little	Hollywood Abby Mallard
2006	Over the Hedge	Gladys
2006	Cars	Kori Turbowitz
2008	Kung Fu Panda	Master Tigress
2008	Madagascar: Escape 2 Africa	Florrie
2011	Kung Fu Panda 2	Master Tigress
2011	Cars 2	Sally Carrera
2014	The Nut Job	Andie
2014	How To Train Your Dragon 2	Valka
2016	Kung Fu Panda 3	Master Tigress
2017	The Nut Job 2	Andie
2017	Cars 3	Sally Carrera
2019	How to Train Your Dragon: The Hidden World	Valka
2019	The Lion King	Shenzi
2019	The Angry Birds Movie 2	Zeta

=== Music videos ===
Year	Title	Role
2011	"Uvik kontra" by The Beat Fleet	Actress

=== Commercials ===
Year	Company	Role
2009	HPB	Actress
2010	HPB	Actress
