= Behind the Glass (film) =

- Croatian: Iza stakla
- Directed by: Zrinko Ogresta
- Starring: Leon Lučev; Jadranka Đokić; Daria Lorenci
- Release date: 5 July 2008
- Running time: 80 minutes
- Country: Croatia
- Language: Croatian

Behind the Glass (Croatian: Iza stakla) is a 2008 Croatian drama film directed by Zrinko Ogresta. The film premiered at the 2008 Karlovy Vary Film Festival.

== Plot ==
Successful architect Nikola has problems. Already stressed at the office due to a coworker's breach of professional ethics, he goes home to a life with a wife, Maja, and young daughter that offers no respite. Maja can barely contain her pain and anger over her awareness that Nikola is having an affair. Ana, his colleague and mistress of six years, has her own problems, as his endless promises to leave Maja continue to ring hollow. When Maja confesses in a family gathering and Nikola loses his balance as his life spins out of control. Unable to take actions or even make decisions to reverse his problems he made, Nikola finally learns the meaning of the old axiom “he who hesitates is lost” in the midst of unexpectedly tragic consequences.

== Cast ==
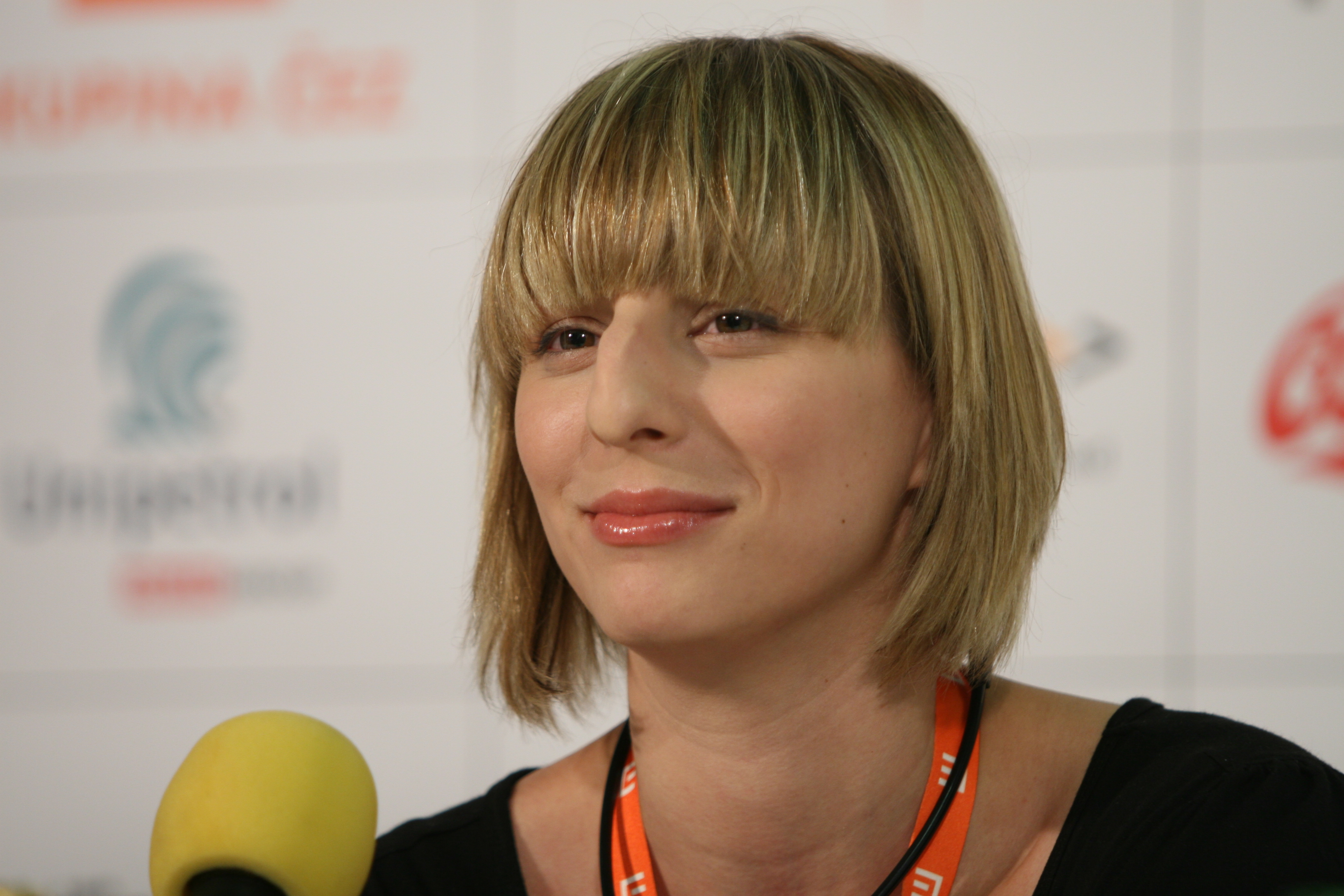
Jadranka Đokić, pictured in 2008 at the Karlovy Vary International Film Festival, has received considerable praise for her performance

- Leon Lučev as Nikola Jeren
- Jadranka Đokić as Maja Jeren
- Daria Lorenci as Ana
- Anja Šovagović-Despot as Ljerka
- Božidarka Frajt as Maja's mother
- Vanja Drach as Maja's father
- Katarina Ljeljak as Ida
- Boris Svrtan as Bosko
- Krešimir Mikić as Miha
- Nina Violić as Marta

== Awards and nominations ==
Year	Group	Category	Recipients	Result	Ref.
2008	Karlovy Vary International Film Festival	Best Film (Crystal Globe)	Behind the Glass	Nominated	
2008	Motovun Film Festival	Audience Award	Zrinko Ogresta	Won	
2008	Pula Film Festival	Best Actress	Jadranka Đokić	Won	
2008	Pula Film Festival	Best Cinematography	Davorin Gecl	Won	
