= Inspector Martin and the Gang of Snails =

2012 Croatian animated film

- Directed by: Igor Lepčin
- Written by: Igor Lepčin
- Produced by: Mario Pulek
- Starring: Božidar Alić; Ljubomir Kerekeš; Luka Jaklić
- Music by: Igor Lepčin
- Release date: 31 May 2012 (Croatia)
- Running time: 82 min.
- Country: Croatia
- Language: Croatian

Inspector Martin and the Gang of Snails (Inspektor Martin i banda puževa) is a 2012 Croatian animated film.

== Plot ==
Inspector Martin loses a mysterious package in a plane crash in the meadow. During the search, he encounters an old friend whom he has hated since elementary school, several snails and their charming Mayor. One by one, Martin and the snails fall into the hands of Wicked Stanko, the worst criminal in the meadow, who is anxious to get ahold of Martin's package and find out what it's made of.

== Cast ==
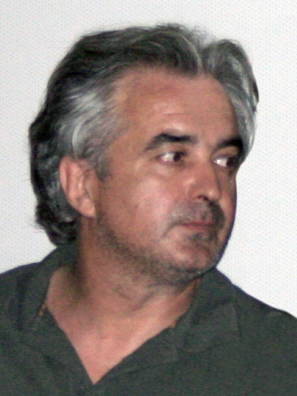
Ljubomir Kerekeš as Inspector Golatch

- Božidar Alić as Inspector Martin
- Ljubomir Kerekeš as Inspector Golatch
- Luka Jaklić as Silvio
- Kristijan Ugrina as Egon
- Robert Ugrina as Franjo
- Baby Dooks as Wicked Stanko
- Zrinka Vrabec-Mojzeš as Mayor
- Denis Obadić as Spaco
- Siniša Popović as pilot
- Hrvoje Kečkeš as Branimir
- Jadranka Đokić as Ivna
- Filip Šovagović
- Branka Cvitković
