= Storm (2009 film) =

- Directed by: Hans-Christian Schmid
- Written by: Bernd Lange; Hans-Christian Schmid
- Starring: Kerry Fox; Anamaria Marinca
- Cinematography: Bogumil Godfrejow
- Edited by: Hansjörg Weißbrich
- Music by: The Notwist
- Release dates: February 7, 2009 (BIFF); September 10, 2009 (Germany); October 30, 2009 (United States)
- Running time: 105 min
- Countries: Germany; Netherlands; Denmark
- Languages: English; German; Bosnian; Serbian

Storm is a 2009 German-Danish-Dutch drama film directed by Hans-Christian Schmid.

== Plot ==
Storm follows the developments of a trial at the Hague for war crimes committed during the Bosnian War. Prosecutor Hannah Maynard (Kerry Fox), charges a Bosnian Serb Commander for killing Bosniaks. However, her main witness is found to be lying and later commits suicide. Hannah retraces his steps to try and get to the truth.

== Cast ==
- Kerry Fox - Hannah Maynard
- Anamaria Marinca - Mira Arendt
- Stephen Dillane - Keith Haywood
- Rolf Lassgård - Jonas Dahlberg
- Alexander Fehling - Patrick Färber
- Tarik Filipović - Mladen Banović
- Krešimir Mikić - Alen Hajdarević
- Steven Scharf - Jan Arendt
- Jadranka Đokić - Belma Šulić
- Dražen Kühn - Goran Durić

== Reception ==
Writing for the New York Times, Stephen Holden called Storm "remarkably restrained" and "very well acted."

On review aggregator website Rotten Tomatoes, the film holds an approval rating of 82% based on 22 reviews, with an average rating of 6.6/10.
