= Medveščak (neighborhood) =

Neighbourhood in Zagreb, Croatia

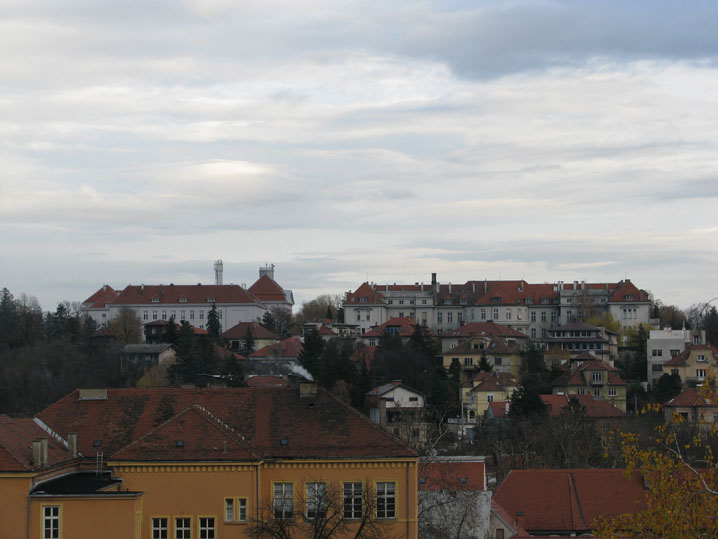
View from Gradec to the east towards KBC Zagreb - Campus Šalata.

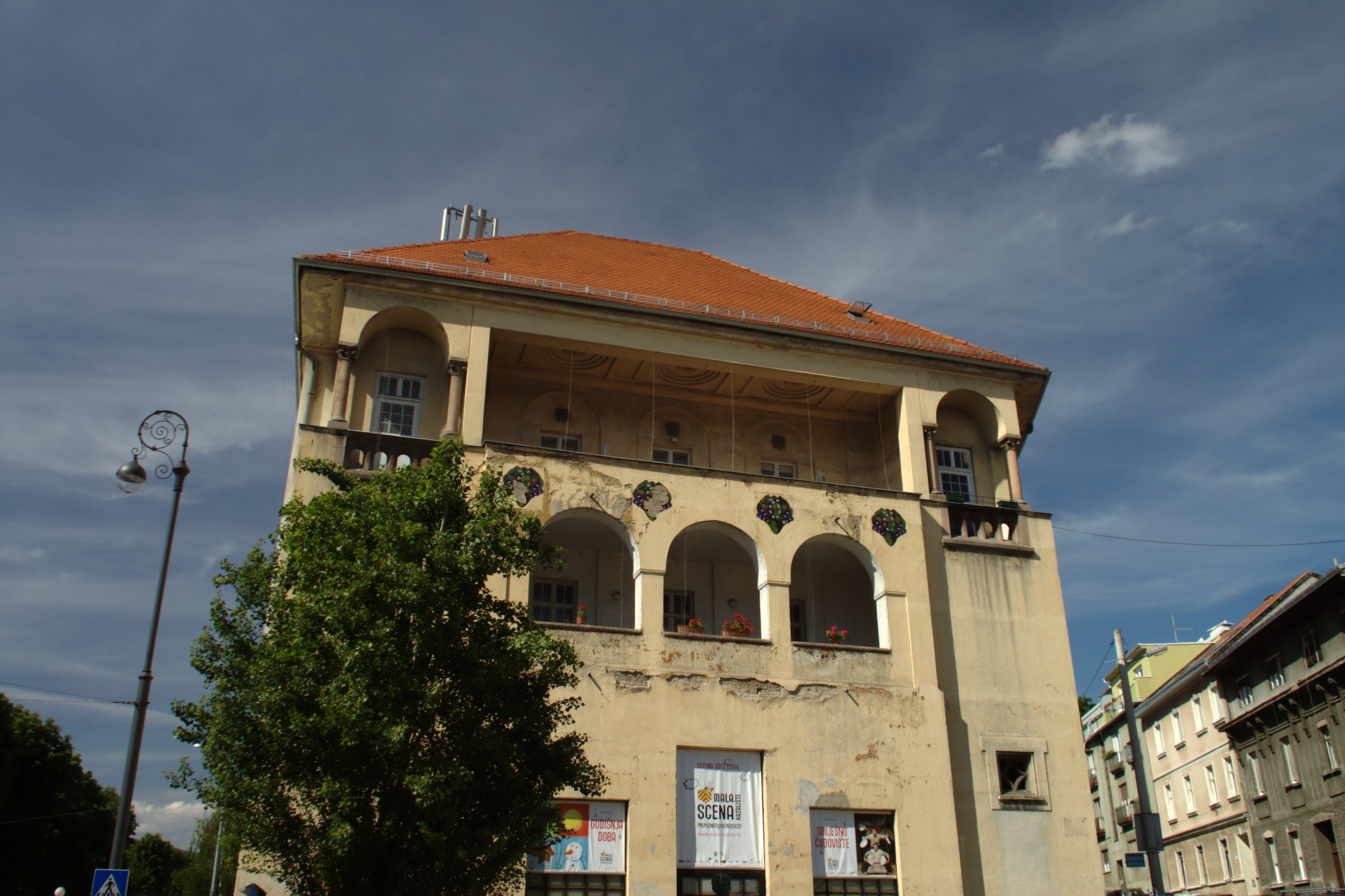
Mala Scena Theatre located at Medveščak Street

Medveščak is a neighborhood of the Gornji Grad - Medveščak district in Zagreb, Croatia. According to the 2011 census, 2,648 people make up its population.

The neighborhood is best known for its theatre, Mala Scena Theatre (Croatian: Kazalište Mala Scena), and Zagreb University's School of Medicine. There is also a small park, Glogovac, situated in the centre. The neighborhood boasts is a variety of high schools, including the II and XVII gymnasiums, a school of midwifery, and various specializing in the creative arts.

An ice hockey club – KHL Medveščak – is the most well-known sports club from Medveščak and the most successful ice hockey club throughout Croatia. The neighborhood also has a fairly successful waterpolo team, VK Medveščak, which was established in 1947.
