= Daniel Načinović =

Croatian poet and journalist

- Born: January 29, 1952 (age 74); Labin, SFR Yugoslavia
- Education: University of Pula
- Occupations: Poet, prose writer, essayist, journalist, translator
- Awards: Order of Danica Hrvatska

Daniel Načinović (born January 29, 1952) is a Croatian poet, prose writer, essayist, journalist, and translator.

A member of the Croatian Writers' Association and the Croatian Journalists' Association, Načinović grew up in Labin and completed his studies in Pula. He then moved to Italy, to pursue his studies of the Italian language. Načinović started writing poetry in high school. His first collection of poems, Watercolors, was published in 1973. Since then, many more collections have been published, and he also authored several essays and works of prose. Today Načinović is also appreciated for his children's books, some of which he both wrote and illustrated. As Načinović is native of coastal Istria, many of his works are in the Chakavian dialect.

== Biography ==
Daniel Načinović has been credited as one of the most prominent contemporary Croatian writers. He is also involved in illustration, painting and music. Načinović was educated in Vinež, Labin, Pazin, Rijeka, Pula and Zagreb. He attended classical grammar school (Klasična gimnazija) at the Episcopal Seminary in Pazin, graduating in 1969. He studied philosophy and theology in Rijeka for two years. In 1975, he graduated from the Pedagogical Academy in Pula, in Croatian and Italian language. He completed his early studies of the Italian language in 1975, at the University of Siena (Italy); and later, in 2002, at the University of Camerino (Italy). He also studied at the Faculty of Philosophy in Zagreb.

He worked as a journalist for newspaper Glas Istre from 1975 to 2001. For a short time (at the end of 1990 and in the first half of 1991) he worked as an editor-in-chief in the editorial office of the newly established, illustrated magazine "Naša Sloga" in Pazin. He was a member of the editorial board of the Pula literary magazine Istra, and of those of Istra kroz stoljeća and Nova Istra. In 1984 he became a member of the Croatian Writers' Association (Zagreb). With writers Aldo Kliman, Miroslav Sinčić, Stjepan Vukušić, Tatjana Arambašin and Boris Biletić, he was one of the members of the Initiative Committee, and one of the organizers of the Osnivačke skupštine Istarskog ogranka Društva hrvatskih književnika ("Founding Assembly of the Istrian branch of the Society of Croatian Writers"), held in Pula on July 2, 1990. After many years as a journalist, in 2001 he became an independent artist and writer, a member of the Croatian Association of Free Artists (Zagreb), and a member of the Croatian Journalists' Association.

Načinović started writing poetry in high school. He started writing prose in the late 1960s, during his stays in Labin, Pazin and Rijeka. His first works of prose were published in the Zagreb-Rijeka Omladinski tjednik (1971) and Hrvatske novine (1971) from Eisenstadt (Željezno) in Burgenland, Austria. His first extensive selection of poems, entitled Watercolors (Akvareli), was published for the first time in the Pula magazine Istarski mozaiku (1973). While studying in Pula, Načinović was a member of the Istrian Fighter Book Club (Književnoga kluba "Istarski borac"). He published poetry and prose works, as well as translations and literary essays, on the pages of the literary magazine Istra. His first book of poems, Tu i tamo nedjelja ("Here and There Sunday"), was published by the Čakavian Parliament (Čakavski sabor) in 1976.

Načinović also wrote several essays, and translated some of his works into several languages (English, Italian, German); his works have been published in Italian, Slovenian, Macedonian, Polish, Esperanto, and Albanian. He also contributed newspaper articles, reports, interviews, feuilletons, travelogues and reviews to various newspapers.

Načinović performed several times at the Melodije Istre i Kvarnera. Several songs written by Načinović won the festival. He participated in several other song contests and festivals, including Kastav's Čansonfest, which he won as best singer-songwriter in its first edition in 2019. In 2003, "Trag u beskraju" (A Trail in Infinity), Načinović's version of Biagio Antonacci's "Se è vero che ci sei", written for Oliver Dragojević, won the latter several Porin Awards.

On May 24, 2013, Načinović's Čakavian adaptation of Carlo Goldoni's The Mistress of the Inn (Oštarica Mirandolina) debuted at the Istrian National Theater.

== Bibliography ==
=== Poetry ===
- Here and There Sunday (Tu i tamo nedjelja) (Publishing Association of the Čakavian Parliament Pula, Pula, 1976), poems,
- Libar od vrimena ("Rijeka Publishing Center", Rijeka and "Istratisak", Pazin, 1984), Chakavian canconier with a sonnet wreath of the same name, with a conversation by Jelena Lužina-Sladonja,
- Jadranske pjesme ("Istarska naklada", Pula, 1984),
- Čovik na tin svitu ( Istrian Literary Colony "Grozd", Pula, 1990), Chakavian Poems, with a Conversation by Miroslav Sinčić and Goran Filipi, ISBN 86-7097-028-7
- Što ima stolar pod jastukom (Istrian Literary Society "Juraj Dobrila" and Matica hrvatska, Pazin branch, Pazin, 1992), poems,
- Elohim (Matica hrvatska, Ogranak Pazin, Pazin, 1995), poem. Drawings: David Ivić. Comment by Antun Milovan, ISBN 953-6237-11-3
- Rhapsody in CA ("Matthias", Labin, 2000), poems written in Labin cakavica, ISBN 953-97272-8-6
- Ur, raccolta di poesie ("Mara", Pula, 2002), collection of poems written in Italian, ISBN 953-7001-04-0
- Jingle Joyce ("Rijeka Publishing Center", Rijeka, 2003), collection of poems, ISBN 953-6939-03-7
- Gospa od Škrpjela ("Nova Istra" / Istrian Branch of the Croatian Writers' Association, Pula, 2004), poem,
- Krotitelj riječi (Croatian Writers' Association, Zagreb, 2006), poems, ISBN 953-6810-67-0
- Manutekstura (joint book of poems with Božica Pažur; Kajkavsko spravišče, Zagreb, 2006), with a discussion by Jože Skok and Ivo Kalinski, ISBN 953-6056-19-4

=== Prose ===
- "Obale masline i trgovi" ("Istarska naklada", Pula, 1980), stories and short stories;
- "Obale masline i trgovi" (Zavičajna naklada "Žakan Juri", Pula, 1999), stories and short stories (second, supplemented edition, with a talk by Aldo Kliman ), ISBN 953-6487-14-4

=== Essays, feuilletons and articles ===
- Desk (Istrian branch of the Croatian Writers' Association, Pula, 2005), ISBN 953-6858-09-6

=== Books for children and young people ===
- Peninsula of Dreams ("Istarska naklada", Pula, 1983), songs and short fairy tales for children. Illustrations: Miroslav Šuput.
- Bank, what a mess (“Istarska naklada”, Pula, 1984), songs for children. Illustrated by Miroslav Šuput.
- One Summer in Poreč (“Eines Sommers in Poreč” – “Adriatikturist”, Poreč, 1985), a story for children. Author's illustrations.
- My Dad Shipbuilder (“Istarska naklada”, Pula, 1986), picture book. Songs and dashes. Illustrated by Miroslav Šuput.
- Sunce ima dva barkuna (National University of Poreč, Poreč, 1987), songbook / picture book for children. Composer Nello Milotti. Illustrated by Đanino Božić.
- Magic Accordion (IKD “Juraj Dobrila”, Pazin, 1995), fairy tales and stories for children. Illustrated by the author.
- A Cat Eaten (“Josip Turčinović”, Pazin, (1996), 1997), songs for the youngest. Illustrated by the author.
- Burrra (“Reprezent”, Buzet, 1997), picture book. Illustrated by Nevenka Macolić.
- Una, povedi i mene (“Medit”, Pula, 1998; German version: “Istrien im Märchen”, published by the Istria County Tourist Board and “Medita; translation: Marieta Djaković” ), picture book, computer photo collages by Predrag Spasojevic.
- Belarmin, the celestial rider (“Juraj Šižgorić City Library”, Šibenik and Šibenik Theater, 2001), poems and fairy tales, with a talk by Pero Mioč, ISBN 953-6163-61-6
- Merry Christmas, Sybil (Profil International, Zagreb, 2001 and 2002), fairy tales. Illustrated by Tomislav Zlatić.
- La Borrra (albo illustrato per bambini; "Reprezent", Buzet, 2002), translated into Italian by Giacomo Scotti.
- Veli Jože's Cravat (Academia Cravatica and Alfa, Zagreb, 2003), picture book in Croatian, English (The Big Joe's Cravat) and Italian (La Cravatta di Veli Joze); illustrated by Ivan Gregov.
- Saints Kuzma and Damjan, Stories and Thumbnails about the Protectors of Fažana" (Matica hrvatska, Pazin, Fažana, 2004)

=== Special editions ===
- Pula from old postcards ("Sportska tribuna", Zagreb and the Historical Society of Istria, Pula / Zagreb, 1988), monograph. Introductory essay
- Reflection of the Golden Fleece and poems.
- Pula ("Tribina" Zagreb and the Archaeological Museum of Istria, Pula / Zagreb, 1990), tourist guide. Text "See Pula and come again".
- Our Lady of the Sea (Parish Office of Our Lady of the Sea, Pula, 1991), small monograph.
- Istra terra magica(co-authorship, with Prof. Dr. Andro Mohorovičić; Publisher "Laurana", Zagreb, 1993)
- Rovinj on Old Postcards (co-authored with Marin Budicin; Žakan Juri Publishing House, Pula and the Center for Historical Research, Rovinj / Centro di ricerche storiche, Rovigno, 1998), monograph (separate editions in Croatian, Italian, German and English), introductory essay "Rovinj's barcarole or mysterious strokes of time over the city of St. Euphemia".
- Pula ("Angolo" and "XXX", Pula, 2000), photomonography by Duško Marušić Čiči. "Song of Pula" and essay "Return of the Argonauts".
- Istria, the big heart of the Adriatic ("Medit", Pula, 2000), small monograph.
- Pod starim voltama (together with photographer Eduard Strenja; Istrian branch of the Society of Croatian Writers, Pula and "Josip Turčinović", Pazin, 2007), travelogues (visiting Istrian towns).

=== Anthology ===
- Stories from Istria (Croatian narrators of the XX century. Selection, introductory essay and notes on writers. University Library in Pula and the Istrian branch of the Society of Croatian Writers, Pula, 1999),

=== Translations ===
- Eduardo De Filippo: Filumena Marturano (Adamić, HNK Ivana pl. Zajca and Društvo hrvatskih književnika, Ogranak Rijeka, Rijeka, 2003), Čakavian (abbreviated translation).
- Rope on top of all buckets (“Errata Corrige”, Poreč, 2003), Chakavian translation of the biblical “ Song of Songs ”, together with Drago Orlić, ISBN 953-6365-15-4
- Antun Branko Šimić: Stupore nel mondo (Con i testi originali a fronte, 50 brani d'un classico della poesia moderna croata; University Library of Pula and the Istrian branch of the Croatian Writers' Association – Pula, 1998), translation of Šimić's poems into Italian, ISBN 953-96833-4-3

=== Scenarios for documentaries ===
- Ancient Pula, Histria film, 1988.
- Pula, the port of sunken ships, Croatian Television, 1991.
- Istria, the European Gate of the Mediterranean, Histria film, 1991.
- Our Lady of the Sea, Croatian Television, 1991.

=== Inclusions in anthologies and surveys ===
- Milorad Stojević: Čakavian Poetry of the 20th Century (Rijeka Publishing Center, Rijeka, 1987).
- Mirjana Strčić: Croatian Poetry of 19th and 20th Century Istria ("Istria through the Centuries", Čakavian Parliament, Pula 1989).
- Via Crucis Croatiae – istarska molitva za Lipu našu (Matica hrvatska, Pula, MCMXCI-MCMXCII).
- Kanat rožic, tići i sonca (group of authors, Narodno sveučilište Poreč, Poreč, 1992).
- Stijepo Mijović Kočan: Collected Heritage – Contemporary Croatian Poetry 1940–1990. (Školske novine, Zagreb, 1993).
- Versi na šterni (Chakavian verses in the collective collections of the poetry event in Vižinada; Narodno sveučilište Poreč, 1994, 1995, 1996, 1997, 1998, 1999).
- Branko Čegec and Miroslav Mićanović: The Passion of Difference / The Dark Sound of Emptiness – Croatian Poetry of the Eighties and Nineties (“Quorum”, No. 5/6, Zagreb, 1995).
- Lucja Danielewska: Zywe zradla (anthology of contemporary Croatian poetry in Polish; Wydawnictwo Ksiazkowe IbiS – Warsaw, 1996).
- Boris Biletić: I ča i kaj i što (From Contemporary Croatian-Istrian Lyric Poetry; University Library in Pula and the Istrian Branch of the Croatian Writers' Association, Pula, 1997).
- Josip Bratulić, Vinko Brešić, Stjepan Damjanović and Božidar Petrač: We are the only ones dear to us... (Croatian patriotic poetry from the Baška tablet to the present day; Alfa, Zagreb, 1998).
- Good Friday Lyrics (Passion Heritage 1; Erasmus Publishing and Passion Heritage Association, Zagreb, 1998).
- Europa erlesen – Istrien, Wieser Verlag, 2nd edited edition, Klagenfurt / Celovec, 1998.).
- Neven Jurica and Božidar Petrač: In the Shadow of Transcendence (anthology of Croatian spiritual poetry from Matoš to the present day; second amended edition; Školska knjiga, Zagreb, 1999).
- Krešimir Filipčić, Krešimir Oblak, Dr. Antun Šojat: Anthology of Popular Songs in Croatia (Book VII; Croatian Association of Music and Variety Performers, Zagreb, without indication of year, (2000).
- Histria, proceedings of the competition for dialect poetry / atti dal concorso di poesia in dialetto, Grožnjan / Grisignana, 2000).
- Božidar Petrač: Croatian Christmas lyrics from Kranjčević to the present day (anthology;, Naklada Jurčić, Zagreb, 2000).
- Božidar Petrač: Croatian Easter Lyric from Kranjčević to the Present Day (Naklada Jurčić, Zagreb, 2001).
- Miroslav Šicel: Anthology of Croatian Short Stories (Disput, Zagreb 2001).
- Stijepo Mijović Kočan: Selected Heritage – 100 Years – Poems – Poets of Croatian Poetry of the 20th Century (PAN knjiga – Zagreb, 2001).
- Kaj & ča (Permeations and Perspectives – Panoramas of Literary Encounters; Kajkavsko spravišče, Zagreb 2004).

=== Awards and recognitions ===
- Plaque of the Labin Republic, 1977
- Second prize in the international competition for the short story of the Pasarić Foundation, for the story "The End of Summer", Rijeka, 1993.
- Award of the City of Pula, 1996
- First prize of the national competition "Passion Heritage 1997" for the poem "Cross on the Grotto", Zagreb, 1997.
- Matica hrvatska Zagreb silver plaque to the publisher, Matica's branch in Pazin, and the author of the book "Elohim", 1997.
- First prize at the international competition for dialectal poetry, "Histria" – Grožnjan, 1997.
- "Ivana Brlić Mažuranić" Award, Školske knjige Zagreb, for the text of the picture book "Burrra", awarded in Slavonski Brod in 1998.
- Scholarship of the Austrian Cultural Institute in Zagreb, 1998
- Bernardin Split Award, CRO Patria – Split 1998
- Medal of the President of the Republic of Croatia, Dr. Franjo Tuđman.
- Order of Danica Hrvatska with the figure of Marko Marulić, Zagreb, 1998
- "Ljubo Pavešić" Awards of the City of Rijeka and the Festival of the Melody of Istria and Kvarner, 1984 1996 1999 1999 and 2004
- First prize in the "Drago Gervais 2001" competition. for an unpublished collection of poems "Jingle Joyce", City of Rijeka, 2001.
- Lifetime Achievement Award of the City of Labin for the affirmation of the Labin cakavica, the speech of Labin and its surroundings, 2002
- Porin Award 2003, "A Trail in Infinity" (Trag U Beskraju), hit of the year performed by Oliver Dragojević; a translation and adaptation of Biagio Antonacci's "Se è vero che ci sei".
- Istria County Award for a literary work on Istria, for the book "Jingle Joyce" – International Meeting of Publishers "Road to the Center of Europe, Pazin – Mitterburg – Pisino, 2003.
- Istrian County Award for translation into Chakavian – "Kanat on top of all bins" ("Song over songs"); Drago Orlić and Daniel Načinović, Pazin 2004
- Special recognition of the Croatian National Theater Ivan pl. Zajc Rijeka "Dr. Đuro Rošić "for the translation of" Filumena Marturano "by Eduardo De Filippo, Rijeka 2004.
- 1st prize for best monodrama at the 1st Meeting of Croatian Spiritual Literary Creativity "Stjepan Kranjčić" 2009 for the monodrama "To God, which cheers up my youth" (K Bogu, koji razveseljuje moju mladost)
- 2nd prize at the Dubravko Horvatić Award 2011 for poetry
