= Zauvijek susjedi =

- Genre: Comedy
- Country of origin: Croatia
- Original language: Croatian
- No. of seasons: 1
- No. of episodes: 180

Production
- Running time: 30 minutes

Original release
- Network: Nova TV
- Release: 24 September 2007 – 30 May 2008

Zauvijek susjedi (English: Neighbors Forever) is a Croatian daily comedy television series that ran on Nova TV from 2007 to 2008. The series follows a group of neighbors that live in the same building.

== Premise ==
The main characters of the series, Ferdo Jurić and Jura Ferdić, are best friend that live in the same building. Ferdo was recently left by his wife Suzana, whereas Jura lives with Lili, although he never comes around to marrying her. Ferdo has a young adult daughter Sanja, who shares an apartment with another two girls: Sanja and Enđi. Other residents in the building include Grof and his servant Koma. As the series progresses, Ferdo enters a relationship with Bela, a therapist.

From day to day, the charterers' destinies intertwine as they find themselves in unusual situations, while navigating their careers and love lives.

== Cast ==
=== Main cast ===
- Ljubomir Kerekeš as Ferdo Jurić
- Darko Janeš as Jura Ferdić
- Slaven Knezović as Jozo Bubalo "Grof"
- Franjo Jurčec as Adolf "Koma" Komer
- Tamara Šoletić as Ljiljana "Lili" Ferdić
- Jelena Vukmirica as Sanja Jurić
- Lucija Hranjec as Anđa "Enđi"
- Sonja Kovač as Viktorija "Viki"
- Antonija Stanišić as Izabela "Bela" Jurić

=== Recurring cast ===
- Goran Bogdan as Andrej
- Karlo Franić as Marko
- Damir Poljičak as Branko

== Controversy ==
Vlatka Pokos attempted to stop the broadcast of an episode she had a guest role in. In the episode, she portrayed Sofija Frajt, who was nicknamed "Dekanica," which Pokos believed was an insinuation to "Dikanica," a reference to her ex-husband Josip Radeljak Dikan; their marriage and divorce was previously a subject of many Croatian news outlets. Pokos claimed that she did not receive the script for the entire episode, but for her lines only, and was thus unaware that the reference was going to be made in it.
