= Kviskoteka =

Croatian television show

Kviskoteka is the name of a general knowledge television quiz broadcast by TV Zagreb. The quiz was created in 1979 and it aired for 15 years from 1980 to 1995.

== Broadcasting ==
The editor and author of the assignment was Lazo Goluža, and Darko Novaković, Branko Lipanović, Boris Senker, as well as other Croatian university professors participated in the creating of the questions. Žarko Domljan and Pavao Pavličić who were part of the jury, also collaborated on the project.

The host of the quiz in the first four seasons was Ivan Hetrich, and then since 1984 Oliver Mlakar, for whom Kviskoteka is mainly associated.

While it aired on TV Zagreb, by many it was the most popular and watched quiz on the territory of the former SFRY.

Kviskoteka was renewed in 2006 on Nova TV, but has not gained much popularity and was removed from the program after one season. The quiz license was sold in 2008 to Serbian television "Foks".

== Games ==
The quiz has been organized into multiple games, which have changed over time. Some of the games are:

- ABCD riddles – introductory game, in which the contestants try to win Kvisko. One of the four offered answers was selected in the game. The points won depend on the number of correct answers: when all competitors answer correctly, they get one point, if there is only one correct answer, it is worth 4 points. Each competitor wins Kvisko if they have 7 or more points.
- Close encounters – in this game you have to pair certain terms, for example, whether two people lived at the same time: Giuseppe Verdi – Jakov Gotovac, Genghis Khan – Kulin-ban, Maria Theresa – Casanova...

The first version of the association game
Points	A horse:
10	Its latitudes have weak winds
9	Xenophon wrote about him
8	Defeated the Trojans
7	Performed at Circus Maximus
6	Was a Roman senator
5	One type is for measuring
4	His death usually flies
3	His shoes are a symbol of luck
2	Marko's colorful but Damian's green
1	One ruler gave a kingdom for him

- Association game – a term is given descriptively, in a series of sentences or words, and players try to guess it. As more questions are asked, the number of points that players can earn decreases. Two systems were used: in the first one used in the first shows, it starts with a question that carries 10 points and each one carries one point less; later the game was modified, and in that system, in a 4x4 array of networks, an attempt is made to guess the solution of the column and then from those solutions and the final solution.
- Detection game – This game was hosted by three people, who presented themselves by reading the same piece of paper (name, first name and occupation) and between them needed to guess the right person, based on the questions asked by the players. This game was worth only 10 points and served as a rest to the players and as entertainment for the audience. There were unusual personalities who were successful in a field and were not usually mentioned in the newspapers. For example, lace-makers from Pag, a folk musician from Montenegro, a magician from Slovenia...
- Question and Answer game – This was a most important quiz game, 24 general knowledge questions, answered by players on a first come first served basis. The system made sure that the notification button was not kept pressed, but had to be pressed again. The game carried the most points and was Kvisko usually used then. Players received 4 points, 3 points, 2 points or 1 point in order of entry. Often, players tactized by not registering for an answer if they felt that they had moved their opponents far enough to avoid losing any points with an incorrect answer.

== Kvisko ==
Kviskoteka's mascot is Kvisko, a brown-colored wood figure designed by academic Miroslav Šutej. Kvisko was not awarded automatically, but it was won by every player who scored at least 7 points in the first game. Players could use it in one of the following games of their choice and then it would double the points scored in that game. Kvisko has become popular with the general public as a synonym for wild card.

Viewers have massively submitted their works on the theme of Kvisko in different crafting techniques, such as figures of different materials, paintings, tapestries, cakes... After sending Kvisko made of Pag lace, lace-makers have appeared in the "detection game".

After the renewation of Kviskoteka in 2006, Kvisko's design and construction materials were changed. It is now made of plexiglass and is blue.

== Quiz today ==
Kvisko is the name for a quiz-based mobile application. Association game is the only category available so far. Behind the app is Kviskoteka's author himself, Lazo Goluža, among others. The English version is called iQuizco.
