= Požega City Theater =

Coordinates: 45°19′51″N 17°40′37″E

- Interactive map of Požega City Theater
- Address: Trg Svetog Trojstva 20; Požega; Croatia
- Current use: Theatre

Construction
- Opened: 1945 (1995)

Website
- www.gkp.hr

The Požega City Theater (Croatian: Gradsko kazalište Požega) is a theater in Požega, Croatia.

== The beginnings of theater in Požega ==
Požega is one of the few cities in Croatia that can boast a three-century-old theatrical tradition. Specifically, according to literary historian Tomo Matić, the first play in Požega was performed on 27 August 1715. The name of the play was not recorded, but it is written that the stage was set under a tent canvas in the courtyard of the Jesuit monastery. The play was performed in front of the church of St. Lovre and it is assumed that it was performed in Croatian because the audience was given content written in German, French and Latin, so that the play can be watched by those who did not speak Croatian. All this happened very soon after the expulsion of the Ottomans who ruled this area for 150 years.

== Establishment of Contemporary Theater ==
Exactly 230 years after the first mention of the theater, in April 1945 the Požegi Sindikalna kazališna grupa ("Trade Union Theater Group") was founded in Požega. It laid the foundations for the first professional theater operating in Požega from 1948 to 1957, which consolidated on March 10, 1995. Požega City Theater officially opened with a play called Gle kako dan lijepo počinje ("Look how the day starts nicely") directed by Ivica Plovanić.

Today, the theater also hosts its own productions, which have been performed on stages throughout Croatia, from national houses to renowned domestic theaters. It should also be mentioned the Croatian Theater Award, the domestic theater Oscar, which was awarded to Požega native Antonija Stanišić in 2002 for her role as Fox in the children's play Pinocchio, as well as numerous other awards and recognitions in various theater categories earned by the City Theater and its actors.

In the past few years, Požega has produced as many as five young actors who graduated from the Academy of Dramatic Arts in Zagreb.
