= Dome, slatki dome =

- Genre: Comedy
- Created by: Morana Foretić; Jelena Svilar
- Directed by: Aldo Tardozzi; Tomislav Rukavina
- Country of origin: Croatia
- Original language: Croatian
- No. of seasons: 1
- No. of episodes: 18

Production
- Running time: 32 minutes
- Production company: Maxima film

Original release
- Network: HRT 1
- Release: 18 March – 22 July 2010

Dome, slatki dome ("Home, Sweet Home") is a Croatian comedy television series created by Morana Foretić and Jelena Svilar. It premiered on 18 March 2010 on HRT 1. The series was produced by Maxima film, and it stars Inge Appelt, Ivica Vidović, Božidar Smiljanić and Luka Juričić.

== Premise ==
The series is set in home for the elderly and disabled called Zrela radost, with the main actors playing the residents of said home.

The plot begins with the arrival of a new resident, physicist Archibald Marinkovic (Božidar Smiljanić), a retired doctor of physics. He came to the home with the intention of doing scientific work in peace. However, he will bring unrest to the trembling hearts of women. Retired medical doctor Rahela Wiesentaller (Branka Cvitković) immediately notices the handsome scientist. However, Ada Fabrizi (Ljubica Jović), a romantic and a double widow with a wealth of experience watching soap operas, immediately chooses him as her new fiancé. This dangerously disrupts the balance of power in Zrela radost.

== Cast ==
- Ljubica Jović as Ada Fabrizi
- Inge Appelt as Marta Kralj
- Špiro Guberina as Vinko Majstorović
- Ivica Vidović as Šime Svrtila
- Boris Miholjević as Dragoljub Šalata
- Branka Cvitković as Rahela Wiesenthaller
- Božidar Smiljanić as Arčibald Marinković
- Vlatko Dulić as Bruno Oblak
- Duško Modrinić as dr. Šalić
- Nebojša Borojević as Silvio Žalec
- Katarina Perica as Jadranka
- Luka Juričić as Srećko
- Jelena Hadži-Manev as Ela
