= Croatian National Theatre, Osijek =

Theatre in Osijek, Croatia

Coordinates: 45°33′35″N 18°40′33″E

Croatian National Theatre in Osijek
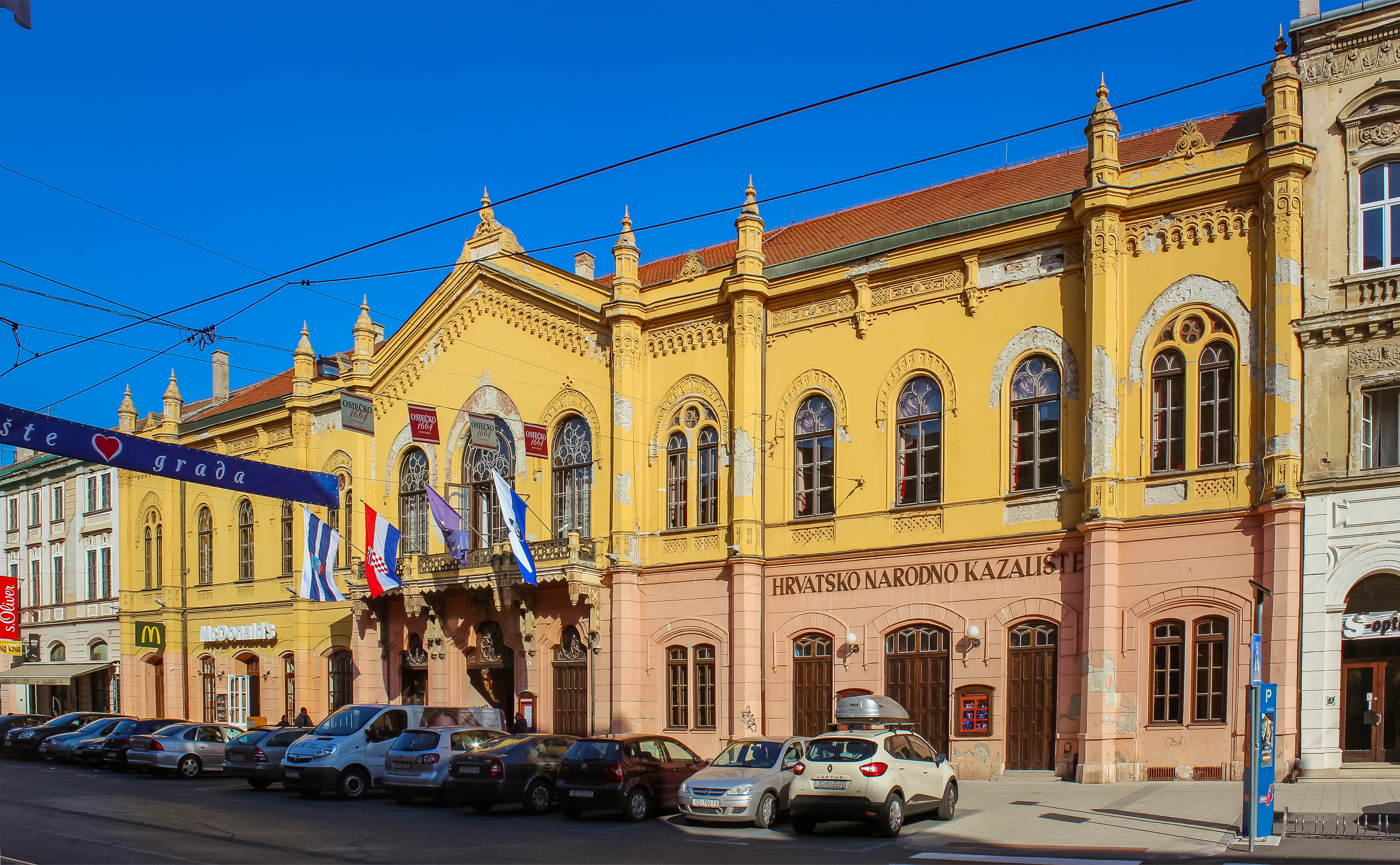
- Croatian National Theatre building in Osijek
- Interactive map of Croatian National Theatre in Osijek
- Address: Županijska ulica 9 Osijek; Croatia
- Current use: Theatre

Construction
- Opened: 1866
- Architect: Karlo Klausner

Website
- www.hnk-osijek.hr

The Croatian National Theatre (Croatian: Hrvatsko narodno kazalište u Osijeku) is a theatre building in Osijek, capital of the Croatian region of Slavonia.

Opened in 1866, and the building was expanded and fully completed in 1907 according to the plans of its local architect, Karlo Klausner. Designed in baroque style and exterior, it was damaged by the JNA during the Croatian War of Independence in the 1990s, and has been extensively restored. The theatre was officially re-opened by then-President of Croatia, Franjo Tuđman in December 1994.

A McDonald's restaurant occupies the street-front area of the theatre.

== Theater history ==
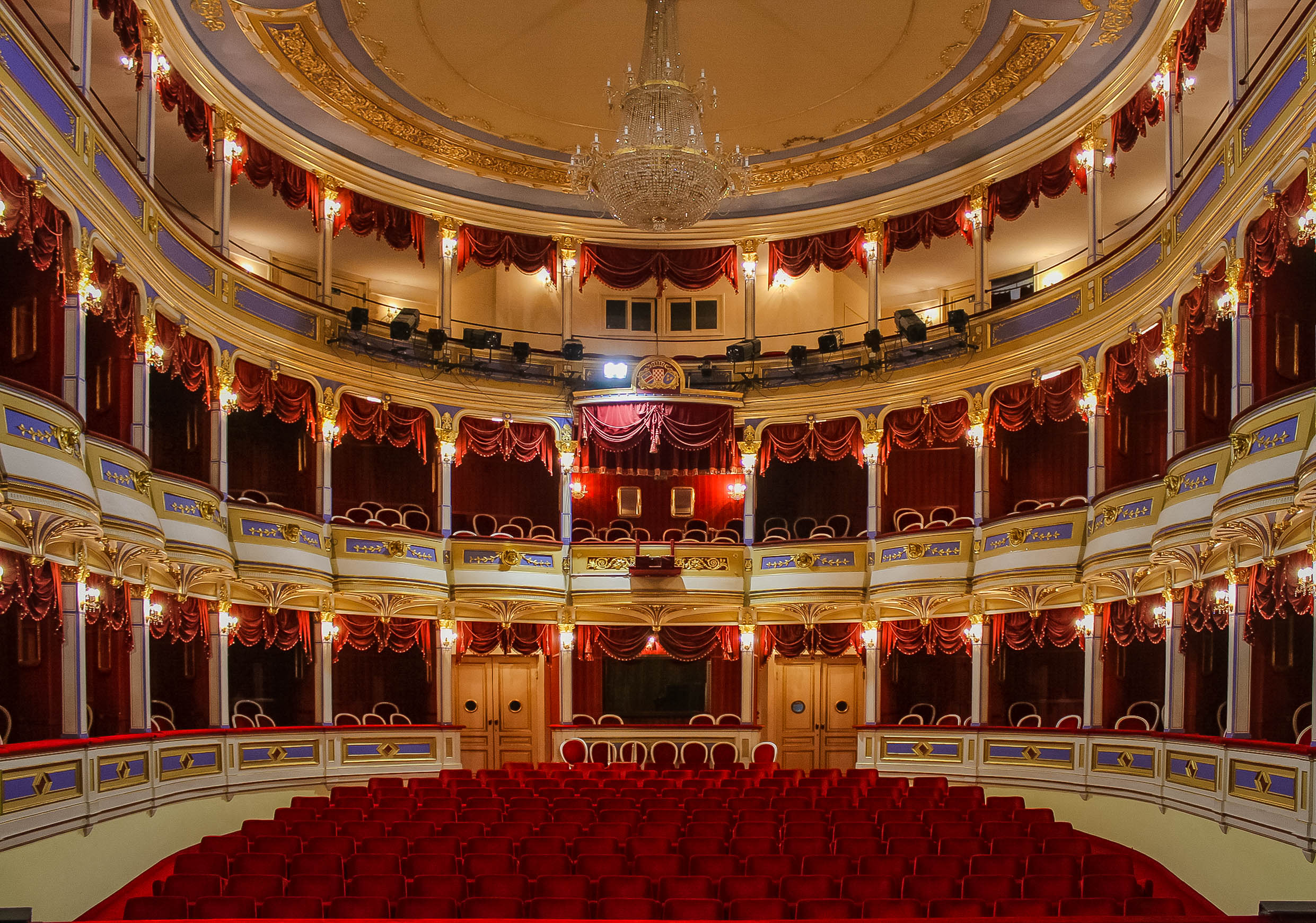
Interior of the theatre

As a border town on the Drava, Osijek, or Esseg in German, had a developed middle class with a large number of Austrian military personnel. Local Jesuit drama existed as early as 1735. The first performances by German-speaking traveling troupes are documented for 1750 and 1765. The oldest surviving theater announcement is on a performance of Alane or the Victory Celebration of Alexander the Great by Alexander Bilderbeck for February 20, 1818. Most of the performers of the German-speaking troupes that visited came from Hungary.

Theater history is documented more precisely starting from 1827/28. In a regulation from May 1827, the Royal Hungarian Governorate in Ofen prohibited local schoolchildren from attending theater performances. From 1828, high school principals were employed as theater censors. In 1827, fifteen plays were banned after their premiere. The authorities, for example, stipulated that Schiller's Don Carlos had to be performed according to the latest Viennese production. From the surviving repertoire, it is clear that the theater in Esseg had a clear influence of Hungarian elements, quite unlike the German theater in the provincial capital Zagreb, which was influenced by Graz and Vienna.

Even after 1860, when the German theater tradition in Zagreb broke off, the German theater in Esseg continued to exist. In the following decades, Croatina ensembles from Zagreb as well as Serbian ones from Novi Sad performed in the house. The German theater tradition existed until 1907, when a Croatian ensemble formed
