= Mala Scena Theatre =

Theatre in Zagreb, Croatia

Coordinates: 45°49′11″N 15°58′48″E

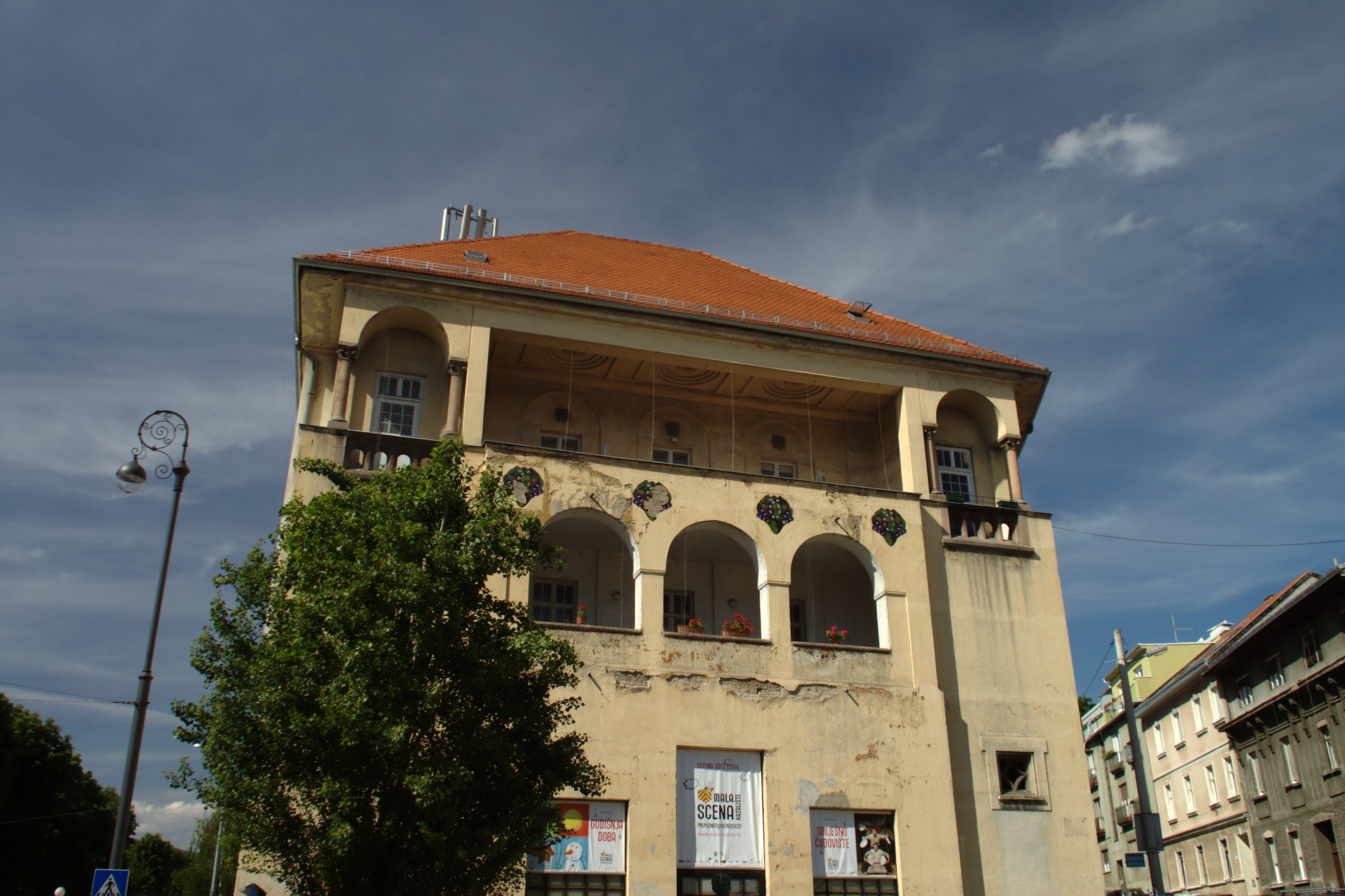
- View of the theatre on Ribnjak Street, Zagreb
- Interactive map of Mala Scena Theatre
- Address: Medveščak 2, 10000 Zagreb; Zagreb; Croatia
- Current use: Theatre

Construction
- Opened: 1989

Website
- www.mala-scena.hr

The Mala Scena Theatre is a theatre in Zagreb, the capital of Croatia. It is credited as Croatia's leading theatre for children. It is also the oldest private theatre for young audiences in Croatia. In 1996, the first Croatian president Franjo Tuđman awarded the founders Vitomira Lončar and Ivica Šimić with the Order of Danica with the figure of Marko Marulić for special merits to culture. In 2009, the theatre received the City of Zagreb Plaque for its work.

In March 2020 the Mala Scena and the Croatian National Theatre announced they would "transfer cultural content from the theatre to the virtual world" in response to the COVID-19 pandemic, as reported by HRT. In the midst of the pandemic it received some financial support from the state.

In recent years the theatre suffered several setbacks, including three bankruptcies, but always managed to get back to its feet. Founded in 1989, the theatre has had 126 premieres and 1,200,000 visitors in thirty years, winning a total of 95 awards.

== History ==
The Mala Scena was founded in Zagreb by actors Zvjezdana Ladika, Roman Šušković Stipanović and the married couple Vitomira Lončar and Ivica Šimić. Today, the theatre is directed by their daughter Buga Marija Šimić.

The couple's first show - Pričalo i Malena (Blumen der Phantasie – Storyman and Tina) played in Munich, at the invitation of Jürgen Flugge, director of the Schauburg theatre, in April 1987. They worked on the play together with Zvjezdana Ladika, and immediately after the visit to Germany, Roman Šušković Stipanović joined them. It was the beginning of the Mala Scena which, as a theatre, was registered in 1988. In the same year, they rented the space then occupied by the neighbourhood council of Medveščak, adapted it and thus got their theatre.

The Mala Scena Theatre officially opened in December 1989, with the play Kraljevna na zrnu graška (The Princess and the Pea).

From 1990 to 1993, when Professor Vlado Habunek also collaborated with the Mala Scena, they tried to maintain three parallel theatre programs: "Evening Stage", "Children's Stage" and "Drama Studio". Professor Habunek gave great impetus to the theatre with the staging of two plays: Dvostruka nevjera in 1990 and Letice & Ljublist in 1992.

After 1993 and Ivica Šimić's participation in a director's seminar in Esslingen, Germany, where he met the most important artists from the world of theatre for children and youth in Europe, Mala scena was increasingly dedicated to work for children and youth. The purpose of some shows of the Mala scena is introducing children to theatre. Its shows treat such themes as the "history of friendship between a man and a musical instrument," crying in children and the problems they go through at school.

Mala Scena has developed a very strong international activity which resulted in numerous guest appearances abroad, but also the organization of international meetings in Croatia. The theatre has performed in English, German, Italian and Chinese. It performed in the world's most prestigious stages, such as the Sydney Opera House, Kennedy Center, and the Za Kōenji.

The Mala Scena produced successful productions like Ana i Mija ("Ana and Mija") and Debela ("Fat"), directed by Snježana Banović, which was performed for over a decade, starring such actors as Ana Begić, Luka Juričić, Anja Matković and Igor Kovač. The latter show went on demand in 2020.

Today, Mala Scena has about 500 plays a year and over 65,000 spectators a year.
