= Istrian National Theater =

Opera house in Pula, Croatia

Coordinates: 44°52′3.45″N 13°50′48.97″E

Istrian National Theatre
- Interactive map of Istrian National Theatre
- Address: Laginjina ul. 5, Pula; Croatia
- Capacity: 697
- Type: National theatre, opera and ballet house

Construction
- Groundbreaking: 1871
- Renovated: 1918; 1956; 1980s

Website
- www.ink.hr

The Istrian National Theater (Croatian: Istarsko narodno kazalište or INK) is a city theater and cultural institution in Pula, established by a decision of the National Committee of the City of Pula on March 19, 1948. The INK is housed in a multi-purpose building, whose former name was Politeama Ciscutti.

== History ==
In 1871, Pula got the theater building Politeama Ciscutti, a universal auditorium for all types of stage and music events as well as various entertainment activities. The Ciscutti Theatre, located on the border of the historic core and the future modern business center of the city, was built according to Ruggero Berlam's project by entrepreneur Pietro Ciscutti. The auditorium consisted of a stage, twenty-eight lodges in the mezzanine, thirty lodges on the first floor and balconies and galleries. The theater could accommodate 800 visitors.

On November 28, 1896, less than a year after Paris, and only a month after Zagreb, the first attempt to show a "motion picture" took place in Pula, at the Ciscutti.

=== Mussolini's speech ===
Perhaps the most important event for international history that took place in the theater was when on September 20, 1920, Benito Mussolini, during his only visit in Pula, gave a speech at the Ciscutti, uttering the following, often quoted words:

When dealing with such a race as the Slavic – inferior and barbaric – we must not pursue the carrot, but the stick policy. We should not be afraid of new victims. The Italian border should run across the Brenner Pass, Monte Nevoso and the Dinaric Alps. I would say we can easily sacrifice 500,000 barbaric Slavs for 50,000 Italians.

— Benito Mussolini, speech held in Pula, 20 September 1920

and infamously stated:

What's the history of the Fasci? It is brilliant! We set the Avanti! of Milan on fire, we destroyed it in Rome. We have shot down our opponents in the electoral struggles. We set fire to the Croatian house in Trieste, we set it on fire in Pula [...]

— Benito Mussolini, speech held in Pula, 20 September 1920

Mussolini's speech expressed a common Fascist opinion against the Croatian and Slovene minority in the Julian March, and was a prelude to the brutal violence against the population of the latter.

== Reconstruction ==
The original theater, inaugurated on September 24, 1881 (constructed after Ciscutti built the smaller Teatro Nuovo, opened on December 28, 1854, between Dante Square and Sergijevac Street, next to the Church of Our Lady of Mercy), was renovated and rebuilt a number of times. When the theater building was reconstructed and renovated for the second time (the first time was in 1918), the works were completed in October 1956. After the reconstruction, the theater was taken over by the National Committee of the District with the aim of expanding the activities of the Theater to the entire territory of Istria (the National Theater from Buje was annexed), so the name was changed into the Istrian National Theater. After 23 seasons of activity with 213 premieres (199 theatrical and 14 operetta titles) 125 authors (66 foreign and 59 domestic) and 2,050 plays, the Liquidation Committee of the Municipal Assembly of Pula on April 29, 1971 issued a decision on the termination of the Istrian National Theater as an institution, due to financial reasons.

For eighteen years, the people of Pula waited for the theater building to be renovated and reconstructed for the third time, and finally welcomed the grand opening on May 5, 1989, with the performance of Jakov Gotovac's opera Ero the Joker.

== Theater ==
The large hall of the INK has 697 seats. There is an orchestra between the stage and the floor. Around the floor, which has 316 seats, there are semicircular left and right mezzanines, and each mezzanine lodge has 46 seats. Above the mezzanine is the first floor, which has the same number of seats on each side as the mezzanine. At the very top there is a balcony divided into three parts, left (54 seats), middle (89 seats) and right (54 seats).
