= Graziadei =

Graziadei is a last name. Notable people with this last name include:

- Antonio Graziadei (1872–1953), Italian academic and politician
- Billy Graziadei (born 1969), American musician
- Ercole Graziadei (1900–1981), Italian lawyer
- Mariano Graziadei (fl. 16th century), Italian painter
- Michael Graziadei, American actor
- Robin Monotti Graziadei, Italian architect
- Vera Graziadei (born 1982), married name of Vera Filatova, Ukrainian-British actress
- Joey Graziadei, American teaching tennis professional and star of the 28th season of The Bachelor.
