= List of Peep Show characters =

Peep Show is a British sitcom starring David Mitchell and Robert Webb. The series follows the lives of two men, from their twenties to their thirties, who live in a flat in Croydon, London. Mark Corrigan (Mitchell), who has steady employment for most of the series, and his lodger, Jeremy "Jez" Usbourne (Webb), an unemployed would-be musician, are the main characters of the show. It was shown on Channel 4 from 2003 to 2015.

== Major characters ==
Characters appear in all series unless otherwise specified.

=== Mark Corrigan ===
Mark Corrigan
- Peep Show character
- First appearance: "Warring Factions" (2003)
- Last appearance: "Are We Going to Be Alright?" (2015)
- Created by: Andrew O'Connor; Jesse Armstrong; Sam Bain
- Voiced by: David Mitchell

In-universe information
- Occupation: Credit manager Waiter; Tour guide Salesman; Banker
- Family: Dan Corrigan (father); Pam Corrigan (mother); Sarah Corrigan (sister); Joshy (nephew)
- Spouse: Sophie Chapman (ex-wife)
- Significant others: Saz (ex-girlfriend); Dobby (ex-girlfriend)
- Children: Ian James (son)
- Home: Flat 5, Apollo House, Croydon, London, United Kingdom
- Nationality: British
- Alma mater: University of Dartmouth

Mark Corrigan (portrayed by David Mitchell) is the miserly, vindictive owner of the flat (in Apollo House) that he shares with Jeremy. Mark is portrayed to be responsible, articulate (both in his inner thoughts and his outer speech) and intelligent, at least compared with most of the other characters. He is also pessimistic, unhappy and socially and sexually awkward. He had a miserable upbringing, and is terrified of his father, who is gruff and difficult. Not much is known of Mark's parents, except that they have remained married despite various marital issues (including infidelity and the fallout from when Mark's father's British Aerospace shares collapsed). Their awkward marriage may be the cause of Mark's own struggles with women, warping his understanding of what a healthy and transparent relationship should look like. Mark is a graduate in Business Studies from the fictional Dartmouth University, where he met Jeremy. He passed 7 GCSEs, and he has a love of history, especially ancient history—which he originally wanted to study at university, before being pressured by his parents into reading business studies instead. He often makes references to history, including Nazi Germany and the Second World War, in relation to events that happen in his day-to-day life.

Mark is convinced that Jeremy's laziness, lack of logical rigour and indifference towards cultural pursuits are markers of low intellect, but often looks to him for social guidance. Mark is plagued by paranoia as to how others perceive him, and by doubts over whether his actions are normal. In spite of his thoughtful and sensible exterior and his tendency to act as the moral centre of his surroundings, he has frequent bouts of selfishness, schadenfreude and impulsive behaviour. He loathes many aspects of modern culture, such as drug use and openness of sexuality; he often simply endures activities that others around him enjoy, viewing them as "the price you pay to avoid loneliness". Despite this, he has a chronic fear of loneliness throughout the show, and continuously perseveres with doomed and irrationally motivated romantic relationships as a result.

Mark's political sympathies are arguably the most developed of any character in the show, and yet they retain some ambiguity. He appears to be politically rational, if socially the exact opposite. He is mildly Eurosceptic, but overall his views appear to be left-of-centre. What could be misconstrued as socially conservative views on his part (such as his disdain for drug use and free love) are more likely motivated by a hatred and fear of other people than a right-wing viewpoint. In the second series he says that "Tony Blair isn't such a bad thing", but in the fifth he claims "nobody wanted New Labour" and shows admiration for Paddy Ashdown of the Liberal Democrats. At one point Mark refers to "the miracle of consumer capitalism" as the backbone of society, albeit often with pessimistic acceptance rather than enthusiasm. He genuinely abhors bigotry and far-right politics, which in Series 2 causes him to lose one of the few true friends he had made onscreen aside from Jez. Mark often criticises those who believe in God, but has been seen praying in times of extreme panic. Although it is never stated in the show, his surname is of Irish origin.

When the series starts, Mark has already been a loan manager at a London branch of JLB (a Frankfurt-based loan and credit company) for around four years, at least judging from the timing given by Jez in Series 2. His time at JLB comes to a close when the branch closes down in the first episode of Series 6; later on, Mark works as a waiter at the Mexican restaurant Banditos, as a bathroom equipment salesman at Bath, Bathrooms, and Fittings, and finally again as a loan manager at the fictional Met City Bank with his former boss Alan Johnson. He is fired in the series finale, partly because of Jeremy's belated reaction to an abusive loan Mark had set up for him at the bank.

Mark's obsession with Sophie and his relationship with her (which is his first), is a major storyline of the first four series. She is seen almost exclusively through his eyes, showing her as merely kind-hearted and preventing the audience from understanding her real personality or motivations. By the third series, however, she is revealed to be narcissistic, boring, impulsive, and abrasive. These revelations coincide with Mark finally getting the chance to get together with her, but Mark is shown to be by this point increasingly apathetic towards her. Nonetheless, he perseveres neurotically with what becomes a passionless relationship bereft of mutual understanding. Mark appears completely unable to comprehend what type of man Sophie wants him to be. She takes no interest in his personal interests, such as history, fuelling him to attempt to lean into his masculinity (which, to her horror, leads him to briefly carry a large knife around). The two become increasingly frustrated and uninterested in one another, but Mark is in denial about what a healthy relationship looks like and refuses to accept that theirs is doomed. Mark's paranoia surrounding loneliness reaches fever pitch when he determines he must marry her or she will eventually leave him. While on a weekend trip with Sophie to Somerset, during which he plans to propose, Mark realises with Jeremy's help that he doesn't actually love her and should break up with her. However, she finds the planned engagement ring before he can tell her this and "accepts", apparently mostly out of a desire to have children. Mark feigns happiness out of fear of humiliation. The pair spend an agonising next few months preparing for a wedding neither truly want (especially Mark), with Mark and Jeremy coming up with increasingly outlandish schemes to get out of it that Mark could never actually succeed with.

Following Mark's and Sophie's disastrous wedding and separation immediately afterwards, he pursues a series of other women during series 5, wondering whether each could be "the one". After he and Sophie have sex following their breakup, she becomes pregnant and later gives birth to Mark's son.

Mark's only other relationship is with Dobby, whom he meets at JLB shortly after splitting from Sophie. As with Sophie, Mark gradually succeeds in getting closer to Dobby and ultimately entering a relationship with her, but Dobby leaves him at the end of series 8 for a job in New York City. She returns in series 9 with an American boyfriend, a new look and a more upbeat attitude, and Mark becomes less attracted to her as a result.

In the final series (9) he has a fling with April, whom he knew briefly years earlier, who is now unhappily married to a middle-aged man, Angus. Mark tries to poach her, but fails in the show's finale when he allows Jeremy and Super Hans to kidnap Angus and hold him captive in their flat, which she discovers.

=== Jeremy Usbourne ===
Jeremy Usbourne
- Peep Show character
- First appearance: "Warring Factions" (2003)
- Last appearance: "Are We Going to Be Alright?" (2015)
- Created by: Andrew O'Connor; Jesse Armstrong; Sam Bain
- Portrayed by: Robert Webb

In-universe information
- Nickname: Jez
- Occupation: Nurse; Musician; Life coach
- Family: Jackie (mother); Helen (aunt); Ray (uncle; deceased); Liz (aunt); Gwen (great-aunt); Martin (stepfather)
- Spouse: Nancy (ex-wife)
- Significant others: Big Suze (ex-girlfriend); Toni (ex-girlfriend); Sarah Corrigan (ex-girlfriend); Elena (ex-girlfriend); Zahra (ex-girlfriend); Megan (ex-girlfriend); Joe (ex-boyfriend)
- Home: Flat 5, Apollo House, Croydon, London, United Kingdom
- Nationality: British
- Alma mater: University of Dartmouth

Jeremy 'Jez' Usbourne (portrayed by Robert Webb) is a "work-shy freeloader" who lives in the spare room of Mark's flat. He is selfish, juvenile and arrogant, but considers himself to be immensely talented and attractive. He is confident, but can sometimes come across as spiteful and stubborn. Although more socially skilled than Mark on a superficial level, his over-confidence and narcissism mean that in practice he is equally socially inept.

Jez displays a readiness to engage in actions that are detrimental to his friends for his own gain, including ganging up on Mark with a bully, overdosing Mark on paracetamol to save a magic mushroom party and then angrily blaming him for the guests' departure, having sex with Sophie (and her mother), ruining some of Mark's onscreen relationships or relapsing Super Hans into drug addiction. His relationship with Mark, which is by far the most developed throughout the series, oscillates between mutual, albeit poorly timed demonstrations of unconditional loyalty and acts and thoughts of deep envy and petty vindictiveness. Jeremy shows a tendency to sabotage Mark's romantic and professional life in ways that are sometimes the result of selfish opportunism, but other times appear to be the unwanted outcome of genuine kindness.

Jez attended Dartmouth with Mark and graduated with a degree in nursing. Jez was a nurse for a while, but quit because he was "disgusted at having to help people". He also receives financial support from his mother, despite maintaining an estranged relationship with her. For most of the series, he pursues a musical career with his friend Super Hans, in a band with no consistent name, despite having little musical talent or skill. In later series he claims to become a "life coach", despite having no ability to do that either. As well as being lazy, Jez is financially reckless, never opens his bank statements, and has apparently spent a "nest-egg" given to him by his mother. He is unaware of how bank loans work, he expresses annoyance at the effort taken to travel to the job centre once a week to claim unemployment benefit, and despite Mark's protestations, bizarrely claims that inheriting £20,000 from a great-aunt will make him a "millionaire". Neither the threat or the reality of becoming destitute encourages Jeremy to try and earn money and pay his own way.

Jez is free-spirited, popular with women in the short term, and enjoys recreational drugs as well as casual sex, although he has several emotionally attached relationships. His first major love interest during the series is Nancy, whom he marries in order to allow her to stay in the UK; she leaves him after he admits to having sex with Toni. He later has a fling with Big Suze, whom he split from shortly before the series began. She leaves him when he tries to convince her to have sex with Johnson for money. During series 6, he has a relationship with Elena, during which he discovers that she is in a long-term same-sex relationship with Gail; he later reveals the affair to Gail. In series 7 he has a fling with Zahra, who lives with her partner Ben. After Zahra and Ben separate, Jez resumes his relationship with her, but she leaves him after he attempts to have sex with Super Hans's girlfriend. In series 8, Jeremy discovers he is in love with Dobby and ruins Mark's plan to propose to her, thereby putting a six-month hiatus on their friendship. In series 9, he enters a same-sex relationship with Joe – who is over a decade younger than him. Jez pretends to be a year younger than he is, which leads to Joe leaving him at his 40th birthday party, in the finale.

=== Super Hans ===
Super Hans
- Peep Show character
- First appearance: "Warring Factions" (2003)
- Last appearance: "Are We Going to Be Alright?" (2015)
- Created by: Andrew O'Connor; Jesse Armstrong; Sam Bain
- Portrayed by: Matt King

In-universe information
- Full name: Simon M. Hans
- Nickname: Hans
- Occupation: Musician; Repairman; Salesman
- Spouse: Molly (ex-wife)
- Children: The twins (sons)
- Nationality: British

Portrayed by Matt King, Jeremy's bandmate and friend, 'Super' Hans is an untrustworthy selfish fantasist who very frequently uses recreational drugs. His musical skills are implied to be only marginally better than Jeremy's, and at least part of his role (which in Season 2 Jeremy is briefly asked to fill in for) seems to be merely to front for other bands, "hit a few keys on the sequencer, make a bit of a show". Hans's real name is Simon (as revealed during his wedding to Molly in series 9). He experiences a crack cocaine addiction in the second series, remarking "that crack is really moreish", later referenced again in the final episode of the third series and in the seventh series.

In spite of the damage he routinely causes to his brain, he is portrayed to be a fast thinker, and the drug-addled stream-of-consciousness that passes for his normal speech is occasionally insightful and indicative of a huge volume of pop-culture knowledge. His professed political beliefs appear to be closer to the far-left of the political spectrum (probably some warped, sui generis form of left-wing anarchism combined with a willingness to provoke outrage) but given that his thoughts are not audible as voiceovers, it is difficult to know how much he truly adheres to anything he says. He ostensibly had a rough childhood, which included being locked up by his father to "monitor the home brew." He seems to be unfazed and unaffected by things that would shock, scare or repel others, but he does appear to have his limits as well, as exemplified by a New Year's Eve party that is too disturbing even for him in the series 7 final episode.

Hans' contentious opinions often contradict Jeremy's ideas. His tough-love attitude towards Jeremy thinly masks a readiness to betray him whenever it suits him, e.g. edging him out of band projects, stealing his love interests, claiming sole ownership of shared song credits or having Jeremy take the blame for his own drug use and then leaving him temporarily homeless in order to save his marriage. His relationship with Mark is shown as tolerant initially, though later seasons show a closer friendship between the pair. Whilst the two have very little in common, Hans seems less concerned by Mark's social awkwardness than others, and even expresses sincere and unprompted appreciation of Mark's character and friendship on the evening before Hans's wedding, while Mark is often surprisingly forgiving of Hans's eccentric and destructive behaviour.

He works in a recording studio in the first series. At the end of series five he and Jeremy join a religious cult whose teachings resemble a cross between Scientology and the theories of Wilhelm Reich, and Hans has (or feigns) a much deeper commitment to their beliefs than Jeremy. During the finale of the sixth series he says that he is father to eight-year-old twins who have an opaque connection to the German language. In series five, he says that he is barred from entering some EU countries. He is of constant surprise to the others, including in the last episode of the seventh series in which he has apparently found the love of his life, a previously unseen young East Asian woman, who speaks no English, but a tiny bit of German. In the final series he marries a woman called Molly. Because of her hatred for Jeremy, Hans asks Mark to be his best man at their wedding, revealing either a very small circle of friends, or, a lack of any 'straight' friends also acceptable to Molly. However, she leaves Hans after he kidnaps Angus in an attempt to help Mark. At the wedding, it is revealed that Hans's real name is Simon, and two young boys are present who seem to be the aforementioned twins. At the end of the series, he decides to go to Macedonia and open a moped rental shop. Russell Brand originally auditioned for the part. Hans was inspired by the character Danny from the film Withnail and I.

=== Alan Johnson ===
Alan Johnson
- Peep Show character
- First appearance: "Mark Makes a Friend" (2003)
- Last appearance: "Are We Going to Be Alright?" (2015)
- Created by: Andrew O'Connor; Jesse Armstrong; Sam Bain
- Portrayed by: Paterson Joseph

In-universe information
- Nickname: Johnson
- Occupation: Loan officer Banker
- Significant other: Big Suze (ex-girlfriend)
- Nationality: British

Alan Johnson (portrayed by Paterson Joseph) is a senior loan manager at JLB. Usually referred to and addressed simply as "Johnson", he becomes friends with Mark after meeting him at work. During series 2, he becomes Mark's boss. His approach to life in general and business in particular is basically an aggressive, social Darwinian apology of the survival of the fittest and borderline fascistic, as seen in his eulogy for Gerard in series 8. Although a confident, suave and intelligent businessman and apparently a pillar of the community, he was previously an alcoholic for 15 years. Mark continues to get on well with Johnson despite some misunderstandings, and Johnson is one of the few people who takes Mark's side after the breakdown of his marriage to Sophie. Johnson and Jez dislike each other from the start, even more so after Big Suze leaves Jez for him. During series 6, after the termination of the UK JLB operation, he lives in a council house with Suze, referred to by Mark as his "recession residence" and shows delusions due to his fall from power. He swindles Mark out of £2000 by attempting to make him an executive in a new consultancy agency. In the final episode of series 7, he throws away his sobriety during a new year party. He drives an E39 520i BMW, but later on during the show is seen being driven in an E65 7 series BMW.

=== Sophie Chapman ===
Sophie Chapman
- Peep Show character
- First appearance: "Warring Factions" (2003)
- Last appearance: "Kid Farm" (2015)
- Created by: Andrew O'Connor; Jesse Armstrong; Sam Bain
- Portrayed by: Olivia Colman

In-universe information
- Nickname: Soph
- Occupation: Accountant
- Family: Ian Chapman (father); Penny Chapman (mother); Jamie Chapman (brother); Geoff (uncle); Nana (grandmother); Barney (cousin)
- Spouse: Mark Corrigan (ex-husband)
- Significant others: Jeff Heaney (ex-boyfriend); Duncan (ex-boyfriend)
- Children: Ian James (son)
- Nationality: British

(s1–7 & 9) Portrayed by Olivia Colman, Sophie Hortensia Chapman is a colleague and love interest for both Mark and Jeff. At the start of the series Sophie is shown as nice and work-oriented, but is portrayed almost exclusively through the eyes of Mark – arguably an unreliable narrator – preventing the audience from actually getting to know her. This is problematic, since in the first and second series especially, Mark suffers from intense paranoia about Sophie and becomes increasingly neurotic and love-stricken. He highly overvalues her and places her on a pedestal, in spite of her having few admirable or exceptional traits and her flakey and shallow behaviour towards him, and overthinks even the most mundane aspects of their friendship (such as their exchange of post-it notes with stupid drawings during work hours). Although they socialise and play tennis on occasion, Mark also appears completely oblivious to the fact he and Sophie have almost nothing in common. Sophie’s own interests are virtually unknown (other than liking a television show she believes is called "Sex in The City") and she appears to have few friends. Sophie has a brief fling with Mark at the start of the series, but a combination of Mark and Jeremy’s poor decision-making – Mark's refusal to see a GP over the hydrocele in his scrotum and Jeremy faking a drug overdose for attention – leads her to finish with Mark before the two have sex.

After she begins a relationship with the more manly Jeff, Mark becomes extremely jealous, partially as a manifestation of the sense of emasculation that Jeff provokes or after Sophie is promoted to a position Mark applied for. By series two, Jeff and Sophie are in a serious relationship. Mark routinely humiliates himself in futile attempts to remain close to Sophie, which include convincing her to take part in a charity bungee jump with him (in which he panics and has to be taken down), pretending to be gay, and hacking her email (which she eventually discovers). Sophie eventually leaves Jeff due to his abusive nature, but moves to Bristol shortly afterward, complicating Mark’s lingering romantic interest in her. It is only around this time in which Sophie's personality is really shown to the audience. Her "normal" aspects are shown to be either boring or generic, or merely cover for her hedonism, heavy drug use, and impulsivity. She is shown to casually lie and act insubordinately, and has an utterly ruthless desire to get exactly what she wants. As a result of the move to Bristol and her increasingly debauched behaviour, Mark becomes less and less infatuated with Sophie, but remains close to her out of his chronic fear of loneliness. When they finally begin a steady, if dull and mostly passionless, relationship, he fails to recognise this. Mark also seems equally unable to understand what she thinks of him or wants from him. The two begin to drift.

Mark eventually comes to the ultimatum that he must either marry Sophie or risk losing her, and the "normal life" he naively believes she offers. This is not only despite their complete lack of common interests or heart-to-heart conversations – the pair do not even live together – but also Mark’s increasing resentment of her. The real reason Mark seems so determined to marry Sophie is due to his own paranoia and a desire for them both to comply with societal expectations. Mark uses the last of his Sunday Times mega-vouchers to take her to the Quantocks for a weekend in which he will propose to her; however, he lets Jez accompany him, who in turn brings along Super Hans to supervise him as he attempts (disastrously) to go cold turkey. Sophie and Mark have nothing to say to one another, and she begins to behave erratically, such as stuffing his guide book into a postbox and getting stranded with a strange elderly couple out on the moors. Completely in denial about their doomed relationship, Mark's inner monologue shows his remarkable annoyance towards Sophie ("Why won't that stupid bitch let me propose to her?").

After wandering the moors one night, Jeremy asks Mark what he actually loves about Sophie, and to Mark’s own bewilderment Mark cannot name a single aspect of her personality he has genuine affection for. Mark suddenly realises he doesn’t love Sophie and therefore doesn’t have to marry her, and becomes ecstatic. Jeremy and Mark then argue about which way to get back to the hotel, with Mark stubbornly insisting on going off on his own in what turns out to be the wrong direction. After getting lost and wandering all night, Mark arrives the next morning back at the hotel in a dishevelled state (his legs sodden after urinating on them “in an attempt to stay warm”) only to find that Sophie has found his engagement ring in his bag. After discussing that neither of them “are getting younger” and her desire to have children, to Mark’s horror, she accepts his proposal. Mark goes along with it out of embarrassment. The next months before the wedding prove agonising for Mark, who is tormented by his lack of love for Sophie and his own cowardice, he rationalises that the marriage might prove successful while also acknowledging to himself that he is only marrying Sophie due to his overweening fear of loneliness, and Sophie is only marrying him because she would be willing to marry anyone so long as it meant she "had a baby this year". They do eventually marry, but Mark hides with Jeremy before the ceremony, causing Sophie to realise he does not love her. She leaves him immediately after the ceremony.

Her family, who are wealthy Conservative voters, live on a large farm in the countryside. She is less friendly with, or respected by, their boss Johnson than Mark is. Dobby and Johnson are the only people in the office to take Mark's side after their disastrous wedding, after which Sophie relapses into drug and alcohol abuse and begins bullying Mark in the office. However, her promiscuity means they have a one-night stand. An extra feature with the series 5 DVD release allows the viewer to hear Sophie's inner monologue over some scenes rather than Mark's or Jeremy's, revealing that Sophie doesn't care if she loses her job, that she speaks French to conversational level, and has £23,000 in credit card debt.

At the start of series 6, she discovers that she is pregnant with Mark, Jez, or Jeff's child. By the end, a DNA test proves that Mark is the father. In the first episode of series 7, their son is born. Despite his greatest efforts, Sophie is let down throughout series 6 and 7 by Mark concerning his responsibilities as a father, including unintentionally missing the christening of his son and therefore losing his rights to name his own baby as punishment. Sophie is mentioned – but does not appear – in series 8. She returns in series 9 for one episode where she offers Mark the chance to live with her and their son at her grandmother's cottage, which she had gained after her death. Mark initially agrees for baby Ian's sake, but changes his mind in favour of pursuing April.

=== Jeff Heaney ===
Jeff Heaney
- Peep Show character
- First appearance: "Warring Factions" (2003)
- Last appearance: "Are We Going to Be Alright?" (2015)
- Created by: Andrew O'Connor; Jesse Armstrong; Sam Bain
- Portrayed by: Neil Fitzmaurice

In-universe information
- Occupation: Loan officer Banker
- Significant other: Sophie Chapman (ex-girlfriend)
- Nationality: British

Portrayed by Neil Fitzmaurice, Jeff is a colleague of Mark and Sophie's at JLB and an intimidating, manly bully from Merseyside. He repeatedly clashes verbally and occasionally physically with Mark, not least for the attentions of Sophie, who chooses Jeff but leaves him after he kisses another woman. In the later series, as Mark and Sophie's relationship takes its course, he is frequently seen mocking Mark. After their relationship falls apart, Jeff appears to be gradually getting close to Sophie again. Mark's anger over this peaks when Sophie even considers naming their child 'Geoff'. However, Sophie sees no connection between this name and that of Mark's rival, instead claiming that she takes it from her uncle. In series 7, he becomes the baby's godfather when Mark and Jez both fail to turn up on time, and it appears that Jeff and Sophie are back in a relationship by the end of the series, which is a major torment to Mark, who constantly believes that his son will think Jeff is his father. Jeff confirms they are back together when he comes to Mark's house to collect the baby in series 8. Jeff returns in the very last episode in series 9, no longer with Sophie but once again working for Alan when Mark is fired from his new job.

=== Dobby ===
Dobby
- Peep Show character
- First appearance: "Spin War" (2008)
- Last appearance: "Gregory's Beard" (2015)
- Created by: Andrew O'Connor; Jesse Armstrong; Sam Bain
- Portrayed by: Isy Suttie

In-universe information
- Full name: Debby
- Occupation: IT technician
- Family: Katie (sister)
- Significant other: Mark Corrigan (ex-boyfriend)
- Nationality: British

(s5–9) Portrayed by Isy Suttie. Dobby works in the IT department of JLB and is a self-described misfit, much like Mark, although she exhibits much superior personal and emotional adjustment compared to the other characters in the series. She tells Mark that her real name is Debbie, but everyone calls her Dobby. She has many interests that are similar to those of Mark, including MMORPGs. Mark meets her in series 5 episode 2 in the office canteen and quickly develops strong feelings for her, as does Mark's colleague Gerard soon after. Dobby expresses obvious interest in, and feelings for Mark in the first episodes, and even takes the bulk of the sexual initiative during their first encounters. However, Mark's failure to act on those first overtures and ask her out properly from the beginning, coupled with his general emotional and social immaturity once they start dating, as well as negative circumstantial influence (including Sophie's pregnancy and a disastrous Christmas lunch), leads to an at-times-difficult relationship, and she is strongly implied to gradually lose interest in it. By the end of series 7, Mark invites Dobby to move into his flat, and he spends series 8 unsuccessfully encouraging her to do so, while Jez secretly falls in love with her. While Dobby wants to go interrailing across Europe with Mark, he decides the best way to keep her is to ask her to marry him in the Quantocks, as he did with Sophie in series 3. However, Jeremy sabotages this event by revealing his feelings for her to Mark and creating an altercation that results in Dobby walking off to go to New York. In series 9, Dobby returns and meets Mark and the two are friendly towards each other. Just as Mark finally gets over his infatuation with her, he is beaten up by her boyfriend Gregory after he discovers that Mark has been stalking her online for months.

=== Big Suze ===
Big Suze
- Peep Show character
- First appearance: "Mugging" (2005)
- Last appearance: "New Year's Eve" (2010)
- Created by: Andrew O'Connor; Jesse Armstrong; Sam Bain
- Portrayed by: Sophie Winkleman

In-universe information
- Occupation: Actress; Waitress
- Significant others: Jeremy Usbourne (ex-boyfriend Stu (ex-boyfriend); Alan Johnson (ex-boyfriend)
- Nationality: British

(s3–7) Portrayed by Sophie Winkleman, Big Suze lived with Jez in a flat (which he nostalgically refers to as the "love shack") for around a year and a half, prior to the start of the first series of the show. She is occasionally mentioned from series 1 but does not make an appearance until her introduction as a major supporting character in the third series. Suze is posh and is an actress, but between roles works as a waitress in a café. Jez is desperate to get back together with her, and although they reunite briefly, she later leaves him for Alan Johnson. Her nickname comes from her being tall. Her appearance in the third series was intended for Nancy, but Rachel Blanchard was unavailable. During series 6, her relationship with Johnson is troubled, leading to their breakup in series 7, and her throwing a separate New Year's Eve party, resulting in Johnson relapsing into drinking alcohol.

== Minor characters ==
=== April Danecroft ===
(Catherine Shepherd, s2 & 9) A Dartmouth University student and shoe salesgirl who, Mark remarks, "has the magical combination of beauty and low self-esteem". Mark pretends to be doing the same course as her at Dartmouth in order to meet her there. He fails in his attempt to have casual sex with her. She returns in s9 as a successful historian and is unhappily married to boring middle-aged historian Angus. She has a fling with Mark.

=== Gerard Matthew ===
(Jim Howick, s4–8) Mark's colleague at JLB, and later, his rival for Dobby's affections. He has health problems which sometimes result in a need for a tube up his nose. He has similar interests to Dobby – including MMORPGs and live action roleplay. Mark considers himself socially superior to him. In s7, he and Mark form The Dobby Club, an organisation of two who are committed to breaking Dobby up from her boyfriend Simon, deciding that the matter of which of them gets to date her if they succeed can be resolved afterwards. Each would readily betray the other if it meant getting what he wanted. Gerard dies of flu in the first episode of s8.

=== Gail Huggins ===
(Emily Bruni, s6–8) Elena's long-term girlfriend, a member of Mensa and a musician. She manages a Mexican restaurant, hiring Mark until she fires him shortly afterward in s7. In s8, she campaigns to be chairman of the freehold committee in Apollo House.

=== Simon ===
(Mathew Baynton, s7 & 8) Dobby's boyfriend for part of s7. During s8, Simon tries to get Dobby back after she reveals she is going to move in with Mark.

=== Ian Chapman ===
(Paul Clayton, s4–7) Sophie's homophobic, ultra-conservative father who lives with his wife and son in the countryside. He dislikes Mark, but most of the time silently resents him, rather than trying to break Sophie and Mark up. After Mark impregnates Sophie, he tries to persuade Mark to get back together with Sophie. Mark and Sophie's baby is named after him.

=== Zahra ===
(Camilla Marie Beeput, s7) A young woman whom Jez meets in a hospital waiting room while her partner Ben is in a coma. Ben regains consciousness and later employs Jez, in a role which Jez uses as a means to try to get close to, and eventually seduce, Zahra. She is interested in many refined subjects that are beyond Jez, such as foreign-language films and classic literature, including Frankenstein, which he pretends to know about and be interested in as a means to impress her. Jez and Zahra see the film Amelie together, and Jez tries and fails to read Wuthering Heights to impress her book club. They eventually have a fling, unbeknownst to Ben. When Ben and Zahra later break up, Zahra asks Jez to move in with her. She dumps him before he is able to accept her offer, because she finds out that he attempted to cheat on her.

=== Elena ===
(Vera Filatova, s6) Elena is an Eastern European immigrant who lives in the same block of flats as Mark and Jez. She works part-time as a legal secretary in human rights law and deals marijuana on the side. She has a sexual attraction towards fathers, is bisexual, and in a long-term relationship with Gail. She hides the relationship from Jez at the start of their fling, which goes on to become a secret affair. She likes spelt bread, for she is wheat-intolerant.

=== Nancy ===
(Rachel Blanchard, s2 & 4) Arriving in Britain from the US where she had a conservative upbringing, Nancy is hedonistic and carefree. Her attitude towards love and relationships is affected by her upbringing and her Christian beliefs clashing with her personality and desires, leading her to send her boyfriend Jez very mixed messages, from having adventurous, frequent sex to abstaining completely. She marries him to stay in the UK, but does not reciprocate his love for her.

=== Toni ===
(Elizabeth Marmur, s1–2) The next-door neighbour of Mark and Jez, and an object of their affections throughout the first series of the show. She separates from her husband Tony (John Hodgkinson) in s1, but the couple reunite during s2, although they still argue. Her father died when she was three, and she appears to be seeking a father figure. During her childhood she regularly went skiing. She has two sisters; one with cancer, and a half-sister. She is headstrong and liberal, and engages in casual sex with Jez on a few occasions. In s1 e2, she engages in pyramid selling, but at the end of s2 she is working as a supervisor in a call centre.

=== Ben ===
(Danny Babington, s7) Jez and Mark meet Ben – who is in a coma – and his partner Zahra in hospital where Mark and Jez accompany Sophie, who is giving birth to Mark's son. Jez works for Ben in order to spend time with Zahra, enabling Jez to have a fling with her.

=== Sarah Corrigan ===
(Eliza L. Bennett, s3 & 6–8) Mark's sister, a solicitor who aids Mark in regard to custody rights over his son. She first appears having split up with her husband. Jez quickly seduces her, much to Mark's chagrin which worsens when he has sex with her the same night they meet. Jez finishes with her very soon after he finds out Suze is single, but she continues to show a sexual interest in him every time she appears. Although Jez tries to avoid her, he briefly moves in with her and her son Joshy in Series 8, when he agrees to move out of Mark's flat but realises that he has nowhere to go.

=== Megan ===
(Cariad Lloyd, s9) A barmaid whom Jez meets during Super Hans' stag night. He gives her life coaching to help her pursue her dream job as an artist. Jez has an affair with her boyfriend Joe, and also ends up having sex with her behind Joe's back. By coincidence, the two discover the other's cheating with Jez at the same time. Megan agrees to have a "threeism" with the two men based on a set of guidelines, but a dispute on who gets to be with who on which day results in Joe leaving Megan for Jez. Despite her anger towards Jez, Megan attends his 40th birthday, where she reunites with Joe after Jez breaks up with him.

=== Joe ===
(Bart Edwards, s9) Megan's boyfriend. Jez has sex with him on an impulse, which results in an ongoing relationship between the two. Jez also has sex with Megan, but chooses Joe over her. His greater age prevents him from keeping up with Joe, and Jez pretends to be a year younger than he actually is when Jez's 40th birthday approaches. Joe buys him some tickets to spend a whole week raving together, but Jez declines, so Joe returns to Megan.

=== Big Mad Andy ===
(Liam Noble, s3 & 8) An emotionally volatile handyman whom Jez manages to befriend after Andy is tasked with repairing a bathroom door destroyed by Super Hans. Jez attempts to 'life coach' Andy in a futile and self-serving effort to treat Andy's patently urgent mental health problems. Andy is a heavy drinker who punches people when intoxicated in order to provoke a fight and have his own thoughts "punched out of him".

=== Jerry ===
(Tim Key, s9) Mark's colleague who moves in to Jeremy's old room. Although mild-mannered, cheerful, and ostensibly sharing a lot of Mark's more cultured interests (books, history), Jerry proves an irritant, and Mark wishes to return to his more low-brow domestic arrangement with Jeremy.

=== Angus Maynard ===
(Angus Wright, s9) April's husband and a scholar of Byzantine history.

== Overview ==
Actor	Character	Series								
Actor	Character	1	2	3	4	5	6	7	8	9
David Mitchell	Mark Corrigan	Main	Main	Main	Main	Main	Main	Main	Main	Main
Robert Webb	Jeremy Usbourne	Main	Main	Main	Main	Main	Main	Main	Main	Main
Olivia Colman	Sophie Chapman	Supporting	Supporting	Supporting	Supporting	Supporting	Supporting	Supporting		Supporting
Matt King	Super Hans	Supporting	Supporting	Supporting	Supporting	Supporting	Supporting	Supporting	Supporting	Supporting
Elizabeth Marmur	Toni	Supporting	Supporting							
Neil Fitzmaurice	Jeff Heaney	Supporting	Supporting	Supporting	Supporting	Supporting	Supporting	Supporting	Supporting	Supporting
Paterson Joseph	Alan Johnson	Supporting	Supporting	Supporting	Supporting	Supporting	Supporting	Supporting	Supporting	Supporting
Rachel Blanchard	Nancy		Supporting		Supporting					
Catherine Shepherd	April		Supporting							Supporting
Sophie Winkleman	Big Suze			Supporting	Supporting	Supporting	Supporting	Supporting		
Liam Noble	Big Mad Andy			Supporting					Supporting	
Eliza L. Bennett	Sarah Corrigan			Supporting			Supporting	Supporting	Supporting	
Paul Clayton	Ian Chapman				Supporting	Supporting	Supporting	Supporting		
Jim Howick	Gerard Matthew				Supporting	Supporting	Supporting	Supporting	Supporting	
Isy Suttie	Dobby					Supporting	Supporting	Supporting	Supporting	Supporting
Vera Filatova	Elena						Supporting			
Emily Bruni	Gail Huggins						Supporting	Supporting	Supporting	
Danny Babington	Ben							Supporting		
Camilla Beeput	Zahra							Supporting		
Mathew Baynton	Simon							Supporting	Supporting	
Tim Key	Jerry									Supporting
Cariad Lloyd	Megan									Supporting
Bart Edwards	Joe									Supporting
Angus Wright	Angus Maynard									Supporting
