= Robin Monotti Graziadei =

Italian architect

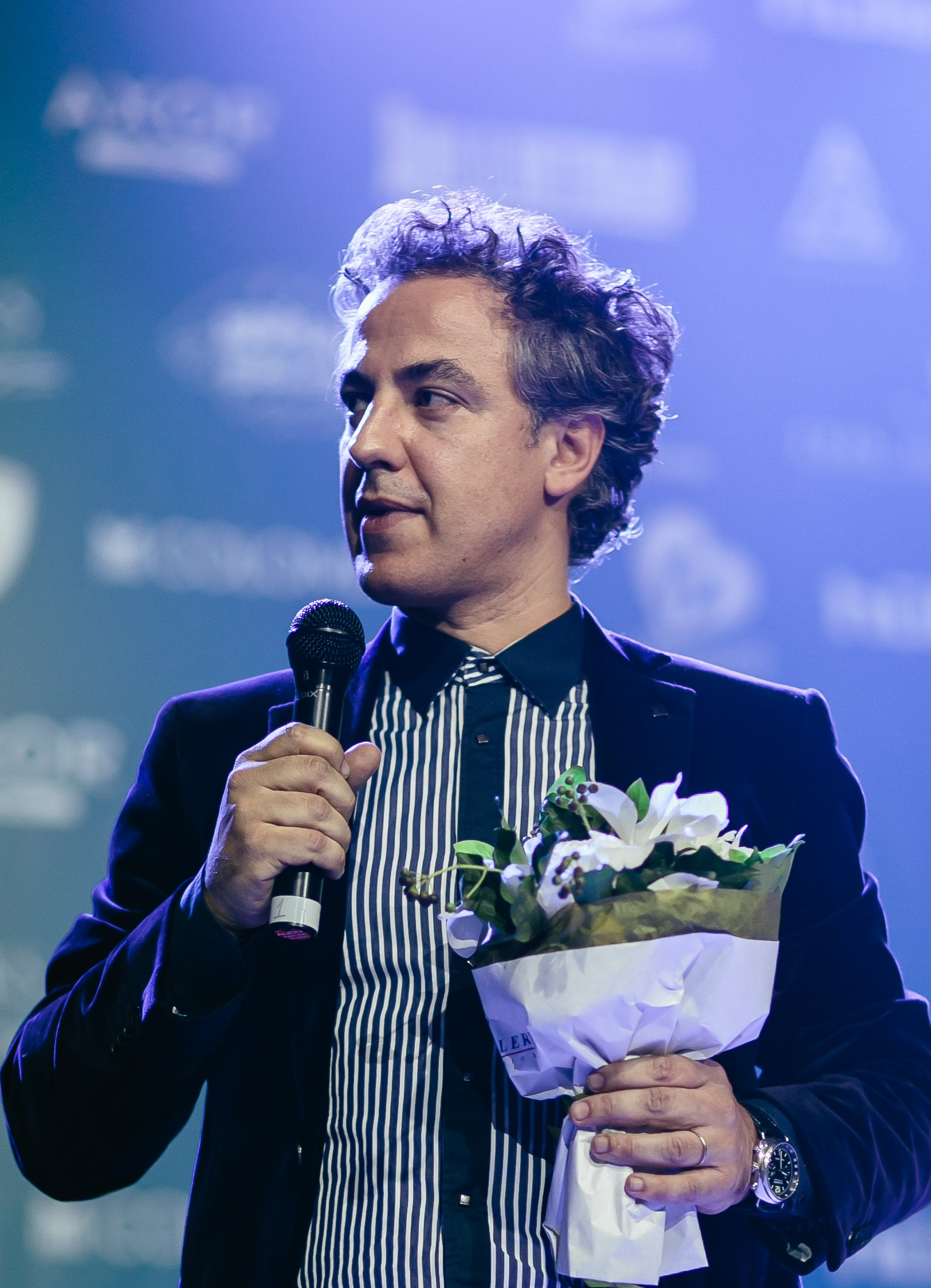
- Citizenship: Italian
- Occupations: Architect; film producer; water fountain designer
- Spouse: Vera Filatova (m. 2008)
- Relatives: Antonio Graziadei (great grandfather); Ercole Graziadei (grandfather)
- Website: robinmonotti.com luminousarts.co.uk

Robin Monotti Graziadei is an Italian architect, film producer, biourbanist and water fountain designer based in London. He was the managing partner of Robin Monotti Architects, a firm that he founded in 2007. In 2010, Monotti won the RIBA and Royal Parks Foundation's International Drinking Fountain Design Competition with his Watering Holes fountain design. In 2016 Robin co-founded the film production company Luminous Arts Productions, which co-produced the drama feature film on the history and philosophy of medicine The Book of Vision executively produced by Terrence Malick.

== Early life ==
Monotti Graziadei was born and raised in Rome. He moved to England when he was 17 and studied BSc Architecture at the University of Bath in 1994. In 2000, he studied MA in Histories and Theories of Architecture at the Architectural Association of London.

== Career ==
From 2001 to 2007, he taught a Diploma Unit at the London Metropolitan University. He started Robin Monotti Architects in London in 2007 before which he worked in offices in architecture office in Rome and Milan. In 2007, Monotti translated Curzio Malaparte's Donna Come Me into English language titled Woman Like Me. Robin co-produced the film The Book of Vision (2020) executively produced by Terrence Malick and starring Charles Dance.

=== Foros Yacht House ===
Foros Yacht house is a building, built by Monotti Graziadei and his firm, at the southernmost tip of the Crimean coastline. It houses four rental holiday apartments arranged around tall yacht storage at ground level, and connected by a staircase tower. He started working on the Yacht house in 2011 and completed it by 2012.

The Yacht house received a lot of media coverage. It was featured in AJ Buildings Library, Contemporist, and Architects' Journal. ArchDaily wrote that the, "Yacht House is a contemporary response to Russia's dacha tradition. Robin Monotti's design is uncompromisingly modern, but also open, playful and people focussed." Architecture Today wrote that "inside, the experience is very much like being in a luxurious yacht, with gleaming white furniture and a rows of porthole windows."

=== Watering Holes ===
In 2010, Monotti Graziadei designed a sculptural stone fountain, called Watering Holes, in collaboration with Mark Titman. They designed the fountain to participate in an International Drinking Fountain competition held by RIBA and Royal Parks Foundation. The competition was intended to find suitable fountains for London's eight Royal Parks. Watering Holes was one of the two winners in the competition. The fountain has three watering holes at heights designed for adults, children & wheelchair users and dogs, cool, fresh drinking water is freely accessible to all park visitors. Watering Holes was listed as one of Time Out's top five drinking fountains in London.

=== Tbilisi Business Center ===
In 2013, Monotti presented the design for Tbilisi Business Center, a 16-floor tower to be constructed next to Bank of Georgia building in Tbilisi, Georgia. The design of the tower is a stack of glass-enclosed disks that seem to spiral upward. The tower will offer 16,000 sq-meter of space as a new business center and will include offices, conference halls, trading floors, restaurants, outdoor garden terraces on each level. As of April 2013, the construction schedule has not yet been determined.

== Personal life ==
Monotti is married to Vera Filatova. They live in London with their son and daughter. He is the grandson of international lawyer Ercole Graziadei the first President of the Council of Bars and Law Societies of Europe and great-grandson of political economist and Marxist economic theory critic Professor Antonio Graziadei, one of the founding members of the Italian Communist Party.

By 2021 Monotti had become known for COVID sceptical views, publicising musician Eric Clapton's anti vaccination opinions.

== Awards ==
- Winner of the RIBA & Royal Parks Foundation International Drinking Fountain Design Competition - 2010
- Winner of first place for the Interior of a House in a Modern Style at the Interior of the Year Awards in Ukraine - 2013
- Winner of the European Property Awards, 2013 - 2014
