= A Woman Like Me =

A Woman Like Me may refer to:

- A Woman Like Me (album), 2003, by Bettye LaVette, and the title track
- A Woman Like Me (film), a 2014 documentary
- "A Woman Like Me" (song), 2006, by Beyoncé

== See also ==
- "Woman Like Me", a 2018 song by Little Mix featuring Nicki Minaj
- "Woman Like Me", a song by Adele from 30 (album), 2021
- "Woman Like Me", a song by Indian singer-songwriter Anushka Shahaney
- Woman Like Me (short story collection), by Curzio Malaparte
