= Tito (miniseries) =

- Genre: Historical documentary
- Directed by: Antun Vrdoljak
- Starring: Boris Svrtan; Ivo Gregurević; Goran Višnjić; Goran Navojec; Tarik Filipović; Goran Grgić; Boris Miholjević; Milan Štrljić; Predrag Vušović
- Theme music composer: Arsen Dedić
- Country of origin: Croatia
- Original language: Croatian
- No. of episodes: 12

Production
- Producer: Antun Vrdoljak
- Cinematography: Vjekoslav Vrdoljak
- Editor: Jasmina Božinovska Živalj

Original release
- Network: HRT1
- Release: March 19 – June 11, 2010

Tito is a 2010 Croatian historical miniseries about Yugoslav leader Josip Broz Tito. The first episode aired March 19, 2010.

The series is a co-production by Croatian Radiotelevision and Mediteran film. The two first collaborated on the series Long Dark Night, which at a top audience of 1.8 million viewers was one of the most-watched domestic productions in history. After the announcement of the documentary, Tito's granddaughter Saša Broz announced that she and her family would use all means possible to obstruct filming. Tito cost a reported 1 million euros to make.

== Cast ==
- Boris Svrtan as Josip Broz Tito
- Ivo Gregurević as Joseph Stalin
- Goran Višnjić as Andrija Hebrang
- Mirjana Rogina as Jovanka Broz
- Goran Grgić as Alojzije Stepinac
- Goran Navojec as Fyodor Tolbukhin
- Nataša Janjić as Olga Hebrang

== Reception ==
The first episode of Tito was seen by 800,000 viewers, recording a rating of 22.6 and a share of 49.9. However, the number of viewers dropped sharply thereafter, and the 11th episode had a rating of just 8.3.

The series was criticized for alleged numerous factual errors, distortions and omissions, lack of originality, and badly executed dramatizations.
