= Tarik Filipović =

Bosnian-Croatian television presenter and actor (born 1972)

- Born: 11 March 1972 (age 54); Zenica, SR Bosnia and Herzegovina, SFR Yugoslavia
- Occupations: TV presenter; actor
- Spouse: Lejla Šehović (m. 2007)
- Children: 2

Tarik Filipović (born 11 March 1972) is a television presenter and actor. He has appeared in over 800 theatre plays since his debut in 1985, as well as numerous films and TV dramas produced throughout the areas of former Yugoslavia. Filipović presents the quiz show Tko želi biti milijunaš?, the Croatian version of Who Wants to Be a Millionaire?, on Croatian Radiotelevision, and used to present Potjera, the Croatian version of The Chase, on HRT1. In 2001, Filipović starred in Behind Enemy Lines as a Serbian soldier.

== Personal life ==
Born to a Bosniak family in Zenica, Filipović went to Zagreb at a young age. He is married to Lejla Šehović, with whom he has one son, Arman. Filipović is the stepfather to her son, Dino Majoli, from her previous marriage to Dado Majoli. He is also a supporter of football clubs NK Čelik Zenica and GNK Dinamo Zagreb.

== Filmography ==
=== Film ===
Year	Title	Role	Notes
1993	Okus limuna		Croatian film
1994	The Price of Life		
1995	Washed Out		
1998	Agonija	Inspector	Croatian film
2000	Srce nije u modi	Croatian soldier	
2001	Polagana predaja		
2001	Behind Enemy Lines	Serbian soldier	
2002	24 Hours	Žuti	
2003	Witnesses	Javni tužitelj	
2004	Long Dark Night	Joka	
2005	First Class Thieves	Narrator	Voice
2005	Two Players from the Bench	Antiša	
2005	Go West	Milan	Acting together with Rade Šerbedžija
2005	Dobro uštimani mrtvaci	Mario	
2006	Ice Age: The Meltdown	Diego	Uncredited
2007	Ritam života	Damir	
2009	Storm	Mladen Banovic	
2009	U zemlji cudesa	Profesor	
2012	Ice Age: Continental Drift	Diego	Voice
2014	Devet položaja samoće		
2014	Markov trg	Marko Crnogača	TV movie
2016	ZG80	Policeman from train #1	
2019	General	Davor Domazet Lošo	
2022	Olympics	Dragan Matutinović	

=== Television ===
Year	Title	Role	Notes
1996	Smogovci	Spasoje	Croatian TV-series
2002	Naši i vaši	prosjak-voditelj	1 episode
2004	Long Dark Night	Joka	
2005	A Mess in the House	Himself	1 episode
2005–2010	Bitange i princeze	Teodor "Teo" Friščić	
2006	Ljubav, navika, panika	Damir	1 episode
2006–2007	Kazalište u kući	Karlo Mamić	
2007	Dobre namjere	Ante Liverić	Croatian TV-series
2007	Tito	Tito's doctor	Croatian TV series about Tito's life
2015–2016	Lud, zbunjen, normalan	Avdija	30 episodes
2018–2019	Konak kod Hilmije	Sturmbannführer Schiling	24 episodes

=== As television host ===
TV show
Year	Title	Role	Notes
2002–2008; 2009–2010, 2019–Present	Tko želi biti milijunaš?	Host	Croatian version of Who Wants To Be A Millionaire
2008–2009; 2010–2011	1 protiv 100	Host	Croatian version of 1 vs. 100
2011–2013	Sve u sedam	Host	Croatian version of Success Verzekerd
2013–2019	Potjera	Host	Croatian version of The Chase
