= The Book of Vision =

2020 film by Carlo S. Hintermann

- Film poster
- Directed by: Carlo S. Hintermann
- Screenplay by: Carlo S. Hintermann; Marco Saura
- Produced by: Gerardo Panichi; Robin Monotti Graziadei; Vera Graziadei; Sébastien Delloye; Jerome Bellavista Caltagirone
- Starring: Charles Dance; Lotte Verbeek; Sverrir Gudnason
- Cinematography: Jörg Widmer
- Edited by: Piero Lassandro
- Music by: Hanan Townshend
- Production companies: Citrullo International; Luminous Arts Productions; Entre Chien et Loup; Rai Cinema
- Distributed by: Parkland Entertainment
- Release dates: September 3, 2020 (Venice); July 8, 2021 (Italy); January 20, 2023 (United Kingdom)
- Running time: 99 minutes
- Countries: Italy; United Kingdom; Belgium
- Language: English
- Box office: $115,061

The Book of Vision is a 2020 psychological drama film directed by Carlo S. Hintermann (in his narrative feature directorial debut) and starring Charles Dance, Lotte Verbeek and Sverrir Gudnason. Terrence Malick serves as an executive producer.

It was selected as the opening film of the International Critics' Week at the 77th Venice International Film Festival.

== Plot ==
In present day, young doctor Eva leaves her promising career behind to study history of medicine, questioning everything from her nature to her body, her illness and sealed fate. Johan Anmuth is an 18th-century Prussian physician in perpetual struggle between the rise of rationalism and ancient forms of animism. The Book of Vision is a manuscript that sweeps these two existences up, blending them into a never-ending vortex. Nothing expires in its time. Only what you desire is real, not merely what happens.

== Cast ==
- Charles Dance as Johan Anmuth
- Lotte Verbeek as Eva / Elizabeth
- Sverrir Gudnason as Stellan / Dr Nils Lindgren
- Filippo Nigro
- Isolda Dychauk
- Rocco Gottlieb
- Justin Korovkin as Günter
- Giselda Volodi
- Vera Graziadei as Rivka Sorkin / Mrs Dobileit
