= The Deep (2010 serial) =

- Genre: Drama
- Written by: Simon Donald
- Directed by: Jim O'Hanlon; Colm McCarthy
- Starring: Minnie Driver; James Nesbitt; Goran Visnjic
- Composer: Samuel Sim
- Country of origin: United Kingdom
- Original language: English
- No. of series: 1
- No. of episodes: 5

Production
- Executive producer: Greg Brenman
- Producer: Will Gould
- Running time: 57 minutes
- Production company: Tiger Aspect Productions for BBC Wales

Original release
- Network: BBC One
- Release: 3 August – 31 August 2010

The Deep is a British five-part television drama serial produced by Tiger Aspect Productions for BBC Wales. Written by Simon Donald, The Deep stars Minnie Driver, James Nesbitt, and Goran Visnjic as members of the crew of a research submarine, who encounter disaster thousands of feet underwater in the Arctic Circle.

The drama was filmed over 12 weeks in and around coastal communities near Glasgow, Scotland, including Dumbarton, Ardrossan and Irvine. The five episode serial was broadcast in August 2010.

== Synopsis ==
A group of oceanographers seek a new source of biofuel in the deepest canyons of the Lomonosov Ridge. A disaster strikes their submarine, stranding them thousands of feet underwater. The group must now deal with clashing personalities and finding a way to the surface.

== Cast ==
- James Nesbitt as Clem
- Minnie Driver as Frances
- Goran Visnjic as Samson
- Orla Brady as Catherine
- Sinéad Cusack as Meg
- Sacha Dhawan as Vincent
- Vera Filatova as Svetlana
- Richard Brake as McIndoe
- Tobias Menzies as Raymond
- Tom Wlaschiha as Arkady
- Nick Nevern as Stas
- Antonia Thomas as Maddy
- Nicholas Pinnock as Goodison
- Molly Jones as Scarlet
- Shonagh Price as Sandra
- Ron Donachie as Sturridge
- Nigel Whitmey as Lowe
- Dan Li as Hatsuto

== Episodes ==
No.	Title	Directed by	Written by	Original release date	Viewers (millions)
1	"To the Furthest Place"	Jim O'Hanlon	Simon Donald	3 August 2010	5.62
A group of scientists begin their mission aboard the submarine Orpheus to discover a renewable source of energy in the Arctic Ocean. They're nervous, however, since the last vessel, Hermes, disappeared with all aboard – including the wife of Orpheus member Clem – under mysterious conditions while on the identical mission. Suspicions are raised even further when a salvage worker joins the group.
2	"Into the Belly of the Beast"	Jim O'Hanlon	Simon Donald	10 August 2010	5.03
The crew begins quarreling over their mission and the numerous crises they're facing. It appears a crew member was killed by the salvage worker, while two others are trapped and running out of air and the Orpheus is without power or navigation. The remaining crew decide to board a massive, mysterious vessel that appears to have come to their rescue. Once there they find nothing except for a ghost ship of dead and mysteriously burned bodies. Unfortunately, they're also not alone.
3	"Ghosts of the Deep"	Jim O'Hanlon	Simon Donald	17 August 2010	4.28
The Orpheus crew has been trapped on a Russian submarine named "Volos". With the submarine's nuclear reactor reaching dangerous temperatures, someone has to deactivate it. However, the person to shut it off will be exposed to lethal radiation. Meanwhile, Clem is determined to discover what part the submarine played in his wife's death.
4	"Everything Put Together Falls Apart"	Jim O'Hanlon	Simon Donald	24 August 2010	3.20
The Orpheus has been repaired, the captain orders the crew to find more samples of the rare bio-fuel that they discovered, before the group rises up to the surface. However, the Russian captain commands his men to kill the crew.
5	"The Last Breath"	Jim O'Hanlon	Simon Donald	31 August 2010	4.27
The crew members of the Orpheus try to find a way of transporting the rare bio-fuel to the surface. However, the captain of the Volos submarine is eager to stop them.

== Production ==
Commissioning of The Deep was announced by the BBC in July 2009. The BBC announced the involvement of stars Minnie Driver, James Nesbitt and Goran Visnjic, and the start of production at the BBC's Dumbarton studios, in December 2009. The shoot ran for 12 weeks, concluding in March 2010. Submarine sets both physical and computer generated were designed by Production Designer Simon Bowles. Location filming also occurred in Ardrossan and the harbour at Irvine. Prosthetic make-up artist Linda A. Morton researched the sorts of injuries sustained by the characters by visiting a hospital burns unit, and referring to photographs of radiation burns.

== Broadcast ==
The Deep was broadcast weekly on BBC One and simulcast on BBC HD from 3 to 31 August 2010. The British Academy of Film and Television Arts held a public screening of the first episode on 19 July 2010. It was followed by a question-and-answer session with Nesbitt and some of the production staff. In Brazil, the series premiered on the channel +Globosat on Thursday, 16 August 2012, at 21 hours.

== See also ==
- List of underwater science fiction works
