= Tko želi biti milijunaš? =

- Based on: Who Wants to Be a Millionaire? by: David Briggs; Steven Knight; Mike Whitehill
- Presented by: Tarik Filipović
- Country of origin: Croatia

Production
- Running time: 60 minutes

Original release
- Network: HRT1
- Release: 24 March 2002 – 3 June 2010
- Release: 19 September 2019 – present

Tko želi biti milijunaš? (English translation: Who wants to be a millionaire?, usually called Milijunaš) is a Croatian quiz show based on the original British format of Who Wants to Be a Millionaire?. The show is hosted by Tarik Filipović. The game show was broadcast from 2002 to 2010 and again since 2019. It is shown on the HRT1.

The show airs on Thursdays in a primetime slot. The 2019 revival saw minor changes to the show, but there were no bigger changes to the quiz format itself. The "zovi" (Phone a Friend) lifeline was shortened down to 25 seconds from 30, due to increased availability and faster speed of internet search engines, such as Google. The choice of contestants for "najbrži prst" (Fastest Finger First) was cut down to 6 contestants from the original 10 (further reduced to 4 in 2020 due to coronavirus), as per the 2018 UK revival. The lifeline "tri znalca" (Three Wise Men) was added in 2020 to temporarily substitute "pitaj publiku" (Ask the Audience) during the coronavirus pandemic, although Ask the Audience returned in 2021.

This version is also the second country (after the Dutch version) to adapt the "Olga" graphics package created by Olga van den Brandt, and is the only country to still use the original version, although Turkish version used a modified version of the original until it switched to the third version.

== Payout structure ==
Question number	Question value (Yellow zones are the guaranteed levels)	
Question number	March 24, 2002 – June 3, 2010 September 19, 2019 – December 29, 2022	January 5, 2023 – present
1	100 kn (€13.27)	€10
2	200 kn (€26.54)	€20
3	300 kn (€39.82)	€50
4	500 kn (€66.36)	€100
5	1,000 kn (€132.72)	€150
6	2,000 kn (€265.45)	€300
7	4,000 kn (€530.89)	€600
8	8,000 kn (€1,061.78)	€1,000
9	16,000 kn (€2,123.56)	€2,500
10	32,000 kn (€4,247.13)	€5,000
11	64,000 kn (€8,494.26)	€10,000
12	125,000 kn (€16,590.35)	€18,000
13	250,000 kn (€33,180.70)	€34,000
14	500,000 kn (€66,361.40)	€68,000
15	1,000,000 kn (€132,722.81)	€150,000

== Rules ==
The main goal of the game is to win the top prize (1 million kn from 2002 to 2022, €150,000 as of January 5, 2023) by answering 15 multiple-choice questions correctly. There are 4 "lifelines", which are ways for a player to get help during the game. They are 50:50 (pola-pola) (2002–present), phone a friend (zovi) (2002–present), ask the audience (pitaj publiku) (2002–2020, 2022–) and an additional lifeline three wise men (tri znalca) (2020–2022). From 2002 to 2022, when a contestant answered the fifth question correctly, they would be guaranteed to leave with at least 1,000 kn. When a contestant answered the tenth question correct, they would be guaranteed to leave with at least 32,000 kn. As of January 5, 2023, When a contestant answers the fifth question correctly, they are guaranteed to leave with at least €150. When a contestant answers the tenth question correctly, they are guaranteed to leave with at least €5,000.

== Top prize winners ==
Bićanić's 1 million kuna question

1,000,000 kn (15 of 15) – no time limit

Which of these female TV presenters ran the Paris Marathon in 2001?

1. Mirjana Hrga
2. Sandra Antolić(correct answer)
3. Mirna Zidarić
4. Ines Preindl

Fifteen contestants have reached the million-kuna question as of September 27, 2019. However, only one contestant, Mira Bićanić, won the top prize on June 14, 2003. She used her "Ask the Audience" lifeline on the final question and then decided to give the final answer, which was correct.

Nobody has yet reached the final question during the time it has been worth €150,000, and the highest prize won so far under the euro has been €34,000, which has been won by ten contestants.
