= Vera Filatova =

Ukrainian-British actress

- Віра Філатова
- Born: Vera Filatova; Ukraine
- Education: Brighton College
- Occupation: Actress
- Years active: 2006–present
- Spouse: Robin Monotti Graziadei (m. 2008)
- Children: 2

Vera Filatova (Ukrainian: Віра Філатова), also known as Vera Graziadei, is a Ukrainian–British actress. She has played Elena in Channel 4's cult series Peep Show alongside David Mitchell and Robert Webb, Eva in Lesbian Vampire Killers with James Corden and Mathew Horne; and Svetlana in a five-part BBC1 drama The Deep opposite Minnie Driver, James Nesbitt and Goran Višnjić.

== Early life ==
Vera Filatova was born in Ukraine, and later moved to the UK. Filatova was educated at Brighton College.

== Career ==
Filatova's TV credits include The Last Detective (ITV), All About Me (BBC One), The Bill, Spooks, The Pagan Queen (US), Agatha Christie's Poirot (ITV), Blue Murder, The Deep (BBC1), Me and Mrs Jones (BBC1). She appeared in the comedy horror film Lesbian Vampire Killers (2009) with James Corden and Matthew Horne, and played Elena in series 6 of the Channel 4 sitcom Peep Show opposite David Mitchell and Robert Webb.

== Personal life ==
Filatova is married to the Italian architect Robin Monotti Graziadei. They live in London with their son and daughter.

== Filmography ==
=== Film ===
Year	Title	Role	Notes
2006	Children of Men	Tribe Leader	
2009	Lesbian Vampire Killers	Eva	Main role
2009	The Pagan Queen	Teta	Main role
2012	Line of Fire	Irina	Short
2013	The Look of Love	Monika	
2016	The Exit	Aisla	Short
2019	The Silence	Vera	Short
2020	White Light	Poet	Short
2020	The Book of Vision	Rivka Sorkin / Mrs. Dobileit	Also producer
2020	They Who Surround Us	Kalyna	Main role

=== Television ===
Year	Title	Role	Notes
2007	All About Me	Petra	TV film
2007	The Last Detective	Kasia	"Dangerous Liaisons"
2007	The Bill	Rita Petrenka	"Crash Test"
2007	Spooks	Anastasya Poselskaya	"6.6"
2009	Blue Murder	Tanya Lucas	"Private Sins: Parts 1 & 2"
2009	Peep Show	Elena	Main role (series 6)
2010	Agatha Christie's Poirot	Olga Seminoff	"Hallowe'en Party"
2010	The Deep	Svetlana	TV miniseries
2011	Doctors	Petra Formosa	"Safe Home"
2012	Me and Mrs Jones	Inca	Main role
2013	Nameless Nobody	Netochka Nezvanova	TV film
2013–14	Crackanory	Irena / Virginia	"The Translator & Road to Hell", "Let Me Be the Judge & I'm Still Here"
