= Council of Bars and Law Societies of Europe =

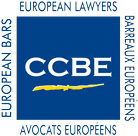
- Type: Bar association
- Region served: Europe

The Council of Bars and Law Societies of Europe (CCBE) is an association gathering together bar associations of 32 countries in Europe (those of the European Union, of the European Economic Area and of Switzerland), The United Kingdom, and an additional eleven associate and observer members. The CCBE represents around a million European lawyers before EU institutions mainly, but also before other international organisations. The CCBE is an international non-profit organisation (AISBL) under Belgian law and has its seat in Brussels.

== Creation and further steps ==
The CCBE was created in September 1960 during a congress of the Union internationale des avocats (UIA) where it was suggested to create a body representing the bar associations of the six founding Member States of the EEC (Western Germany, Belgium, France, Italy, Luxembourg and The Netherlands). The establishment of such a body was seen as necessary in order to represent the interests of lawyers before the EEC.

The project came to life in December 1960 with the creation of “The consultative committee of bars and national associations of the six States of the EEC (gathered by the UIA)”. This appellation was eventually simplified to "Council of Bars and Law Societies of Europe", retaining the abbreviation CCBE. The CCBE became autonomous in 1966. The first President of the CCBE was Count Ercole Graziadei.

In 1977, the CCBE was closely consulted by the European Commission during the drafting of Directive (EC) 77/249 which permitted EU lawyers to provide temporary services in an EU Member State other than their home Member State.

In 1979, the official recognition as representing the interests of the legal profession in Europe was given through its intervention in the case AM&S Europe Limited v Commission of the European Communities, which focused on the question of legal professional privilege for in-house counsel. From then on, the CCBE established a permanent delegation to the Community Courts.

In 1998, the second directive specific to the legal profession, Directive (EC) 98/5, was passed after a long debate within the CCBE. This directive permitted EU lawyers to establish in another Member State, provided that they are registered with, and are regulated by, the local host bar.

The CCBE is regularly consulted by the European Commission and the European Parliament about directives concerning the interests of the legal profession in Europe

== Members ==
Today, all the national bar associations of the 27 Member States of the European Union and of the three Member States of the European Economic Area (Norway, Liechtenstein, and Iceland) and Switzerland are full members within the CCBE. In addition to these “full” members, the bars of the United Kingdom have 'Affiliate' status (giving them full status except for matters relating to the European Union), the bars of other European countries are “associate” members (countries of the Council of Europe in official negotiations with a view of joining the European Union) or “observers” (other countries of the Council of Europe). The associate and observer members have to adhere to the CCBE statutes and are encouraged to adopt the CCBE Code of Conduct.

== Object ==
The CCBE statutes define its object as:

1. To represent the Bars and Law Societies of its Members, whether full, associate or observer members, on all matters of mutual interest relating to the exercise of the profession of the lawyer, the development of the law and practice pertaining to the rule of law and administration of justice and substantive developments in the law itself, both at a European and international level.
2. To act as a consultative and intermediary body between its Members, whether full, associate or observer members, and between the Members and the institutions of the European Union and the European Economic Area on all cross border matters of mutual interest as listed under a) above.
3. To monitor actively the defence of the rule of law, the protection of the fundamental and human rights and freedoms, including the right of access to justice and protection of the client, and the protection of the democratic values inextricably associated with such rights.

Specialist committees and working groups made up of experts from national delegations draft CCBE position papers and contributions in many areas affecting the European legal profession. Topics include lawyers’ ethics (“deontology”), competition as it affects the legal profession, the free movement of lawyers, training of lawyers, international trade in legal services, and human rights. In recent years, working groups have concentrated on issues such as legal aid, criminal law, family law and the law of successions, anti-money laundering, European contract law, alternative dispute resolutions, and collective redress. The CCBE is regularly consulted on the changes to the procedures within the European Court of Justice and the European Court of Human Rights. The CCBE also represents its members in their relations with other lawyers’ organisations in the world for questions of common interest to the legal profession such as fight against terrorism and other serious crimes, and also the ability of lawyers to practice their profession anywhere in the world freely, independently and without any harassment or hindrance.

== Specific initiatives ==
The CCBE identity card was created in 1978. It is drafted in English, in French and in the official language(s) of the issuing bar. The identity card identifies the holder as an admitted lawyer in one of the Member States and facilitates access to courts and institutions for lawyers active outside their home jurisdiction. It is also recognised by the European Court of Justice. Cards are issued in the CCBE's name by national bars to their authorised members, according to the conditions laid down in each member state. The CCBE Code of Conduct, which was adopted in 1988 and amended three times since then, aims to resolve cross-border conflicts due to the simultaneous application of different national codes of conduct to a same situation. The Code governs professional contacts between lawyers within the European Union and in other countries that have adopted it, and the activities of lawyers working in member states other than their own. The Code is a framework of principles covering professional independence, client confidentiality, advertising of services, and behaviour towards clients, courts and other lawyers. The Code is binding only when adopted by a particular bar. The Code has been recognised by the European Commission and European courts and is beginning to be treated as authoritative by national courts.

In 2006, the CCBE adopted a Charter of core principles of the European legal profession. This Charter contains a list of ten principles which have been identified as common to the whole European legal profession and which could be applied by the national bars for their own use and no longer for cross-border cases. Among the principles figure lawyer's independence, confidentiality and avoidance of conflicts of interest, principles which the European Court of Justice recognised in the Wouters case (C-309/99), and several others on which the member bars agreed. The Charter is to serve as a pan-European document, helping, bars that are struggling to establish their independence in Europe's emerging democracies.

Since 2007, the CCBE has been granting a Human Rights Award. This award highlights the work of an eminent lawyer or lawyers’ organisation that has demonstrated outstanding commitment and sacrifice in upholding fundamental values. Though this award, the CCBE aims to contribute to a major awareness campaign of the role of lawyers as players in the Rule of Law. The first prize was granted in 2007 to Avocats Sans Frontières (ASF).

== CCBE and Code of Conduct for Practitioners of Law ==
The CCBE is also the body of authority supervising the Code of Conduct document for all who are practicing law, i.e., the barristers, solicitors and lawyers, first and foremost.
