= Long Dark Night =

2004 film

- Directed by: Antun Vrdoljak
- Written by: Antun Vrdoljak
- Starring: Goran Višnjić; Mustafa Nadarević; Ivo Gregurević; Goran Navojec
- Cinematography: Vjekoslav Vrdoljak
- Music by: Igor Kuljerić; Siniša Leopold
- Release date: 2004
- Running time: 200 minutes
- Country: Croatia
- Language: Croatian

Long Dark Night (Croatian: Duga mračna noć) is a 2004 Croatian film dealing with World War II in Croatia and its aftermath. It was directed by Antun Vrdoljak and starred Goran Višnjić. It was Croatia's submission to the 77th Academy Awards for the Academy Award for Best Foreign Language Film, but was not accepted as a nominee.

The film was also adapted into a 13-episode TV series broadcast by the Croatian Radiotelevision in 2005.

== Cast ==
- Goran Višnjić - Ivan Kolar - Iva
- Mustafa Nadarević - Španac
- Ivo Gregurević - Major
- Goran Navojec - Matija Čačić - Mata
- Boris Dvornik - Luka Kolar
- Tarik Filipović - Joka
- Katarina Bistrović-Darvaš - Vera Kolar
- Žarko Potočnjak - Alojz
- Vera Zima - Kata
- Alen Liverić - Jozef Schmit
- Goran Grgić - Franz Kirchmeier
- Krešimir Mikić - Robert Neuman
