= Goran Višnjić =

Croatian–American actor (born 1972)

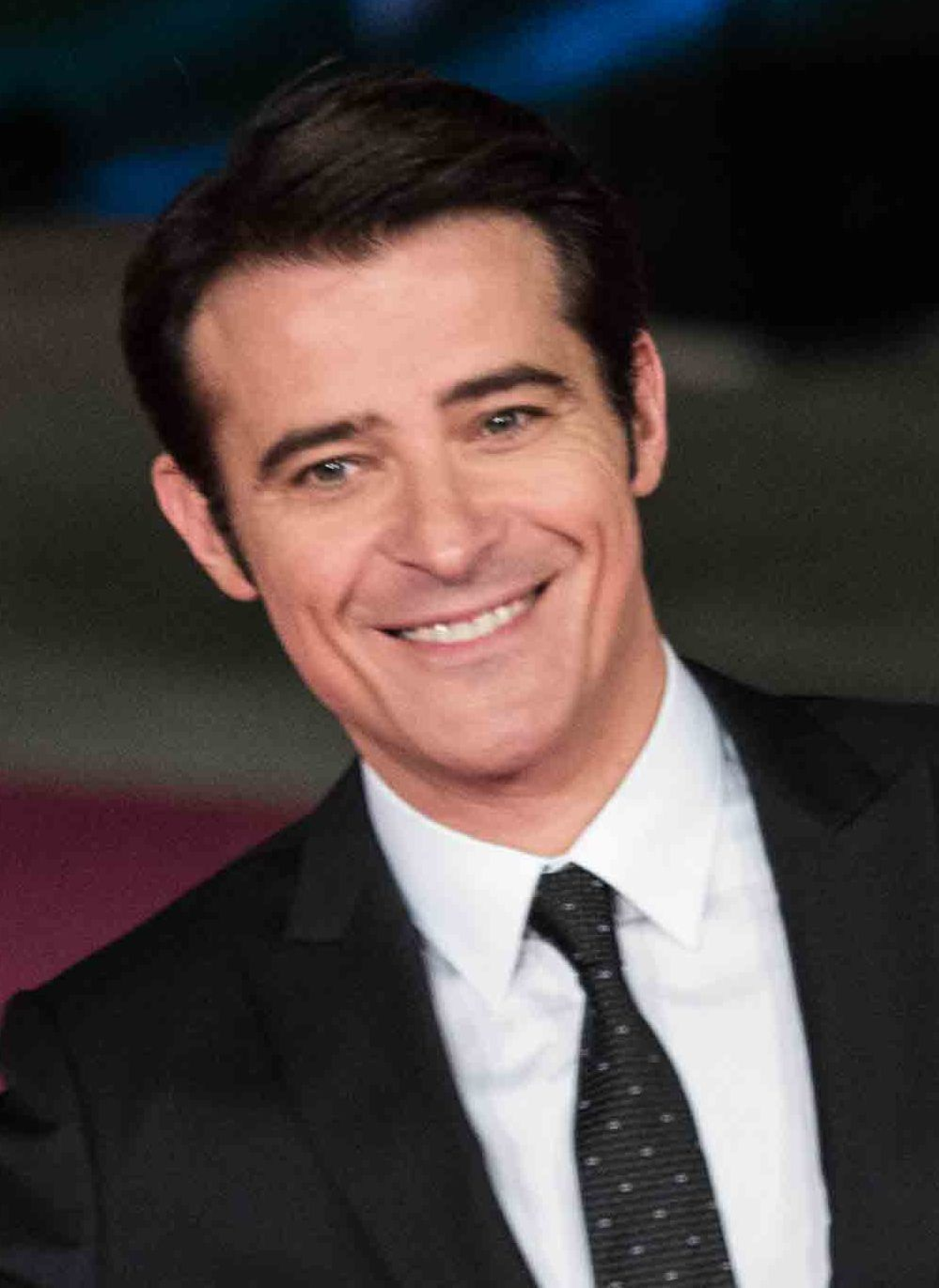
- Višnjić at Rome Film Festival in 2014
- Born: 9 September 1972 (age 54); Šibenik, SR Croatia, SFR Yugoslavia
- Citizenship: Croatia; United States (since 2013)
- Education: Academy of Dramatic Art, University of Zagreb
- Occupation: Actor
- Years active: 1988–present
- Spouse: Ivana "Eva" Vrdoljak (m. 1999)
- Children: 4
- Relatives: Antun Vrdoljak (father-in-law)

Goran Višnjić (Croatian: [ɡǒran ʋîʃɲitɕ] VISH-nyich; born 9 September 1972) is a Croatian actor. He is best known for his roles as Dr. Luka Kovač in ER and Garcia Flynn in Timeless, both NBC television series. For ER, he and the cast were nominated for two Screen Actors Guild Awards.

Višnjić began his acting career in his native Šibenik and gained early recognition on the local television and films. His performance as Hamlet at the Dubrovnik Summer Festival earned him critical acclaim and helped establish his reputation as a leading actor. Later leaving for USA and transitioning to international projects in the late 1990s, he achieved wider prominence through his work in American television and film, including films such as The Peacemaker (1997), Rounders (1998), Practical Magic (1998), The Deep End (2001), Ice Age (2002), Elektra (2005), Beginners (2010), The Girl with the Dragon Tattoo (2011), and The Counselor (2013).

== Early life ==
Višnjić was born on 9 September 1972 in Šibenik, SR Croatia, SFR Yugoslavia. He has one sibling, an elder brother, Joško. His father, Željko, was a bus driver, and his mother, Milka, worked in a market. He appeared in plays throughout his childhood and made his screen debut at the age of 16 in the controversial Yugoslav film, Braća po materi (1988), playing a young Ustaša.

In 1990, at the age of 18, Višnjić served one-year of obligatory military service in the Yugoslav People's Army as a paratrooper. Only weeks after his military discharge in 1991, as Yugoslavia began to dissolve, he joined the nascent Croatian Ground Army. After leaving the army, he moved to Zagreb to study at the Academy of Dramatic Art.

== Career ==
=== 1981–1995: Beginnings ===
Višnjić began acting at his hometown of Šibenik, where he was performing at local theatre. He later expressed that that's the way he got drawn into it; "I just started there as a kid; there was no money involved, no fame. It was just like a big playground". In 1991, Višnjić subsequently had to fight at Croatian War of Independence. In 1992, after finishing his service at 20, he returned to acting and attended the Academy of Dramatic Arts in the capital of Zagreb. Višnjić was the youngest actor to be chosen for the title role in Shakespeare's Hamlet at the Dubrovnik Summer Festival. Originally cast as Laertes and understudy to Hamlet, he took over the role when the star dropped out of the production shortly before the first performance. During an episode of ER, he demonstrated his expertise in the part of Hamlet, by reciting an excerpt from the "To be, or not to be" soliloquy in Croatian. He portrayed the doomed prince from 1994 to 2000, winning three national awards.

=== 1995–2005: ER and move to the United States ===
Višnjić starred as Prince Hamlet for seven years, often playing at Croatian National Theatre in Zagreb. He had the opportunity to be a supporting actor for the 1997 blockbuster drama film Welcome to Sarajevo which was filmed in Sarajevo during the Bosnian War, starring opposite; Stephen Dillane, Woody Harrelson, and Marisa Tomei. He portrayed Bosnian cab driver Risto Bavić. His performance caught the eye of talent agent Elyse Scherz at the Cannes Film Festival, who contacted Višnjić, and offered him employment in the United States. He also appeared in the 1997 American political action thriller film The Peacemaker, alongside George Clooney and Nicole Kidman. After doing publicity and press for Welcome to Sarajevo in the United States, he got introduced to Griffin Dunne, who offered him an audition for his upcoming romantic fantasy film Practical Magic starring Sandra Bullock and Nicole Kidman. Practical Magic was released on October 16, 1998, grossing $68.3 million worldwide against a $75 million budget, becoming Višnjić's big breakthrough. Subsequently, he found work in local television productions and landed a Tuborg beer commercial that aired in Europe. After flying from Croatia and America back-and-forth, he decided to move to the US and continue his career.

In 1998, Višnjić got offered a role as a doctor Luka Kovač for the TV medical series ER. It was his role as Risto, the Bosnian driver in Welcome to Sarajevo that led then-producer John Wells to offer him a role as a doctor to replace the departing George Clooney in the sixth season of ER in late 1999, eventually becoming the show's male lead by the start of season 12, having taken over from the departing star Noah Wyle, who left after the finale of season 11. By season 14, however, he was only making a limited number of appearances, before completely leaving the show early in season 15. In 1998, he appeared in Madonna's music video "The Power of Good-Bye," from her seventh studio album Ray of Light. She contacted him after seeing his performance in the film Welcome to Sarajevo. Calling him "the sexiest male working today", Madonna explained that "[she] was looking for an actor to be in [the] video and his face came right into my head". The video premiered on MTV on September 10, 1998, which further helped Višnjić's career. As of 2026, the music video gained more than 100 million views on Madonna's YouTube channel. He also had a cameo in the film Rounders, and small speaking role in Committed.

While starring on ER, Višnjić worked on other projects. He co-starred in The Deep End; starred in and co-produced Posljednja volja; voiced Soto in 2002 animated film Ice Age, which was a box office success and grossed over $383.2 million, making it the eighth highest-grossing film of 2002 and the highest-grossing animated film of 2002. He starred in Close Your Eyes, alongside Shirley Henderson and Miranda Otto. In 2004, he starred in the television miniseries Spartacus and the film Duga mračna noć. He next appeared with Jennifer Garner in Elektra. In 2005, Višnjić was one of the four finalists for the role of James Bond, eventually losing out to British actor Daniel Craig, with whom he would appear in The Girl with the Dragon Tattoo directed by David Fincher.

=== 2005–2015: Continued success ===
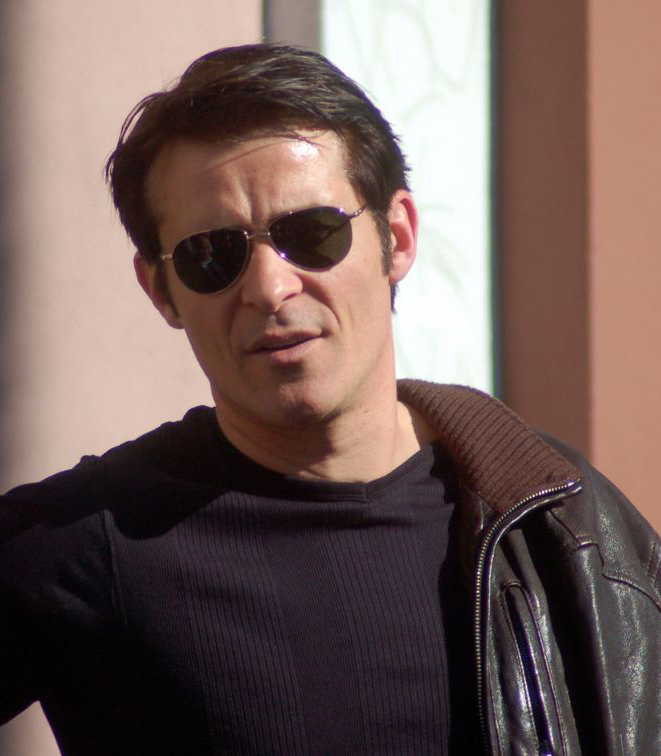
Višnjić in 2012 at a ceremony for John Wells to receive a star on the Hollywood Walk of Fame.

In 2009, Višnjić appeared alongside Carla Gugino in a segment of the film New York, I Love You, an anthology set in New York. Višnjić's segment Apocrypha was directed by Andrey Zvyagintsev. The segment was cut from the theatrical release of the film but was included in the DVD version. He next starred in Helen, alongside Ashley Judd as Judd's character's husband David, which made its world premiere at the Sundance Film Festival.

Višnjić appeared in The Courageous Heart of Irena Sendler, about a young Polish woman who saved the lives of many Jewish children in wartime Warsaw, filmed in Riga, Latvia. It was produced for Hallmark Hall of Fame and aired on CBS on 19 April 2009. He completed a role in Mike Mills' film, Beginners. In late 2009, he was cast as Samson in The Deep, shown on BBC One in 2010.

He appeared as Andrija Hebrang in the television miniseries Tito. He later appeared in the unsold pilot of ABC's Boston's Finest, playing a disgraced cop who works with a female officer to solve crimes while trying to clear his name. He also appeared in the two-episode season three finale of the television series Leverage, as international crime financier Damien Moreau, his first guest appearance on an English-language television program.

In 2011, he played Dragan Armansky, the head of a security agency, in English language version of The Girl with the Dragon Tattoo directed by David Fincher, starring opposite Daniel Craig, Rooney Mara, and Stellan Skarsgård . He has signed on to play this role for the entire film trilogy produced and distributed by Sony Pictures Entertainment. He was featured on a four-episode arc of the television series Pan Am; he played a Yugoslavian attaché to the United Nations.

In 2014, Višnjić played John Woods, the husband of Molly Woods, in Extant, produced by Steven Spielberg. Although the series was renewed in late 2014, he left the series early in the second season.

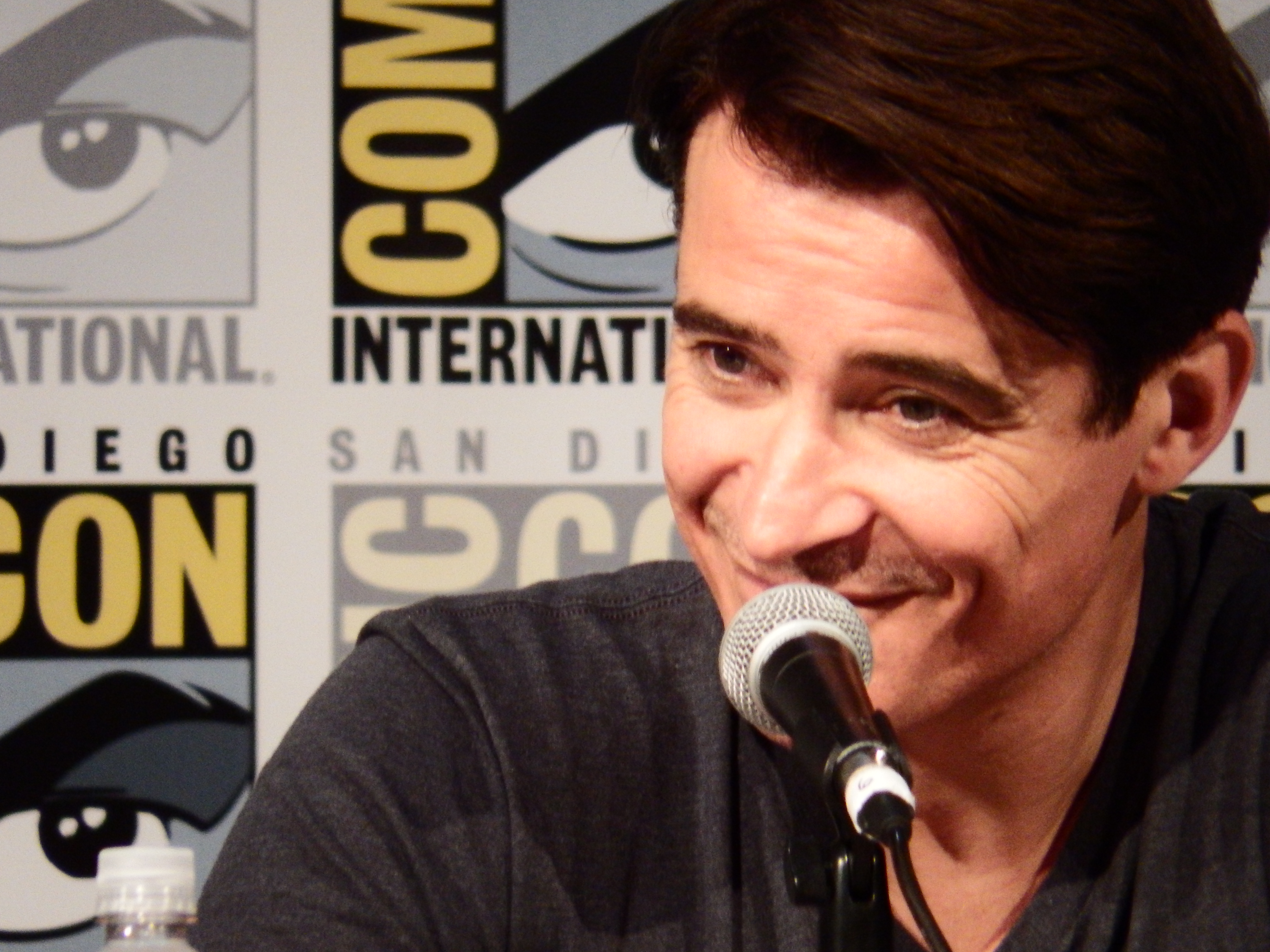
Višnjić at San Diego Comic-Con

From 2016 to 2018, he played former NSA asset Garcia Flynn in NBC's Timeless.

In 2019, Višnjić portrayed Ante Gotovina in the Antun Vrdoljak-directed film General. His performance, along with the film itself gained overwhelmingly negative reviews with many critics, including Milivoj Jukić and Jurica Pavičić calling his portrayal "the worst performance of his career." The critically and commercially panned film was screened at the Pula Film Festival.

Višnjić played Nikola Tesla in the twelfth series of Doctor Who, appearing in the fourth episode, "Nikola Tesla's Night of Terror," first broadcast on 19 January 2020.

In early 2020, Višnjić was cast as Count Dracula in the unsold ABC pilot The Brides, which was written by Roberto Aguirre-Sacasa.

In 2024, Višnjić returned to the stage starring opposite Zrinka Cvitešić and Goran Grgić in Ivo Vojnović's Ekvinocijo, directed by Krešimir Dolenčić at the Dubrovnik Summer Festival. He also appeared in the final season of Vikings: Valhalla as Erik the Red.

== Recognition ==
Višnjić was named People's Sexiest Import in 1999 and "One of TV's Sexiest Men" in the June 5–11, 2005 TV Guide. He was ranked #18 in Hollywood in Best Croatian Male Movie Stars of All Time list in November 2005. He was also named as the Best Croatian Actor in 2004 for his role in the movie Duga mračna noć, according to the votes of Večernji list.

== Personal life ==
His wife, Eva (born Ivana Vrdoljak) is an artist and sculptor, and the daughter of film director Antun Vrdoljak, who controversially headed Croatian Radiotelevision from 1991 to 1995. The couple have two adopted children and one biological child. They resided in Los Angeles, California until 2021, and have three homes in Croatia – Zagreb, Šibenik and Dubrovnik. Višnjić acknowledged paternity of a daughter, Lana Lourdes Rupić, whom he fathered in 2006 with a Croatian woman, Mirela Rupić. In 2021, Višnjić and his family moved from Los Angeles to Cornwall, England. Višnjić supports animal rights and environmental causes.

== Filmography ==
=== Film ===
| Year | Title | Role | Notes |
|---|---|---|---|
| 1988 | Braća po materi | Ustaša | |
| 1993 | Paranoja | —N/a | Short film |
| 1996 | Prepoznavanje | Ivan | |
| 1997 | Puška za uspavljivanje | Devetka | |
| 1997 | The Peacemaker | Bazta Sergeant | |
| 1997 | Welcome to Sarajevo | Risto Bavić | |
| 1998 | Rounders | Maurice | |
| 1998 | Practical Magic | Jimmy Angelov | |
| 2000 | Committed | Neil | |
| 2001 | The Deep End | Alek Spera | |
| 2001 | Posljednja volja | Bepo Stambuk | Also co-producer |
| 2002 | Ice Age | Soto (voice) | |
| 2002 | Close Your Eyes | Michael Strother | Also known as Doctor Sleep |
| 2004 | Duga mračna noć | Ivan Kolar | Also producer |
| 2005 | Elektra | Mark Miller | |
| 2009 | Apocrypha | Man | Short film |
| 2009 | Helen | David Leonard | |
| 2010 | Beginners | Andy | |
| 2011 | The Girl with the Dragon Tattoo | Dragan Armansky | |
| 2012 | K-11 | Raymond Saxx Jr. | |
| 2013 | The Counselor | Michael | |
| 2013 | 95 Decibels | Dr. Corry | Short film |
| 2014 | Dark Hearts | Armand | |
| 2014 | Asthma | Ragen | |
| 2014 | The Journey Home | Muktuk | |
| 2017 | Never Here | S | |
| 2017 | The Tribes of Palos Verdes | Joe | |
| 2019 | General | Ante Gotovina | Also producer |
| 2020 | Fatima | Artur de Oliveira Santos | |
| 2021 | The Accursed | Nikola | |
| 2022 | Hellraiser | Roland Voight | |
| 2024 | Transformers One | Orion Pax / Optimus Prime (voice) | Croatian dub |

=== Television ===
| Year | Title | Role | Notes |
|---|---|---|---|
| 1994 | Michele va alla guerra | Soldier | Television film |
| 1995 | Night Watch | UN Security Officer | Television film |
| 1995 | Vidimo se | Maks | Television film |
| 1997 | Olujne tisine 1895-1995 | Vladimir Vidrić | Television miniseries |
| 1998 | Teško je reći zbogom | Davor | Television film |
| 1999–2008 | ER | Dr. Luka Kovač | 185 episodes |
| 2003 | American Masters | Robert Capa (voice) | Episode: "Robert Capa: In Love and War" |
| 2004 | Spartacus | Spartacus | Television miniseries |
| 2006 | Naša mala klinika | Man on the telephone | Episode: "Bijeli misevi" |
| 2009 | The Courageous Heart of Irena Sendler | Stefan Zgrzembski | Television film |
| 2010 | Tito | Andrija Hebrang | Television miniseries |
| 2010 | Boston's Finest | Angus Martin | Television pilot |
| 2010 | The Deep | Samson Ungliss | Television miniseries |
| 2010 | Leverage | Damien Moreau | 2 episodes |
| 2011–2012 | Pan Am | Niko Lonza | 4 episodes |
| 2013 | Red Widow | Nicholae Schiller | 8 episodes |
| 2014 | Extant | John Woods | 16 episodes |
| 2015 | Crossing Lines | Marco Constante | 12 episodes |
| 2016–2018 | Timeless | Garcia Flynn | 27 episodes |
| 2019–2022 | This Is Us | Vincent Kelly | 2 episodes |
| 2019 | Santa Clarita Diet | Dobrivoje Poplovic | 4 episodes |
| 2019 | Dollface | Dr. Colin Brooks | 4 episodes |
| 2020 | Doctor Who | Nikola Tesla | Episode: "Nikola Tesla's Night of Terror" |
| 2020 | The Brides | Count Dracula | Television pilot |
| 2020 | The Boys | Alastair Adana | 4 episodes |
| 2024 | Vikings: Valhalla | Erik the Red | 4 episodes |

=== Music videos ===
| Year | Song | Artist |
|---|---|---|
| 1998 | "Život" | Tony Cetinski |
| 1998 | "The Power of Good-Bye" | Madonna |
| 2007 | "Burn My Shadow" | Unkle |

=== Web series ===
| Year | Title | Role | Notes |
|---|---|---|---|
| 2012 | BlackBoxTV Presents | The Chemist | Episode: "AEZP: Execution Style" |

== Theatre credits ==
| Year | Title | Role | Venue |
|---|---|---|---|
| 1994–2000 | Hamlet | Hamlet | Dubrovnik Summer Festival |
| 2024–2025 | Ekvinocijo | Niko Marinović | Dubrovnik Summer Festival |

== Awards and nominations ==
| Year | Award | Category | Work | Result | Ref. |
|---|---|---|---|---|---|
| 2000 | Screen Actors Guild Awards | Outstanding Performance by an Ensemble in a Drama Series | ER | Nominated | |
| 2001 | Screen Actors Guild Awards | Outstanding Performance by an Ensemble in a Drama Series | ER | Nominated | |
| 2002 | Satellite Awards | Best Actor in a Supporting Role, Drama | The Deep End | Nominated | |
| 2004 | Festival du Film de Paris | Best Actor | Close Your Eyes | Won | |
| 2004 | Pula Film Festival | Best Actor | Duga mračna noć | Won | |
| 2005 | Vladimir Nazor Awards | Film | Duga mračna noć | Won | |
| 2011 | Gotham Awards | Best Ensemble Performance | Beginners | Won | |
| 2024 | Croatian Theatre Awards | Best Artistic Achievement by an Actor in a Leading Role – Drama | Ekvinocijo | Won | |
