= Ercole Graziadei =

Count Ercole Graziadei (1900–1981) was an Italian lawyer. Son of Political Economist Antonio Graziadei and founder of the International Law office Studio Avv Ercole Graziadei. He was instrumental for the legalisation of divorce in Italy. Among his clients were Ingrid Bergman, Maria Callas, Vittorio De Sica, Roberto Rossellini, Anna Magnani, Charlie Chaplin, the state of Israel, and the Pirandello estate.

He was the first President of the Council of Bars and Law Societies of Europe (CCBE) from 1966 to 1969. The CCBE represents lawyers through the bar associations and legal societies of 41 countries, in two membership tiers: full member and observer.

He was president of Arnoldo Mondadori Editore in 1976.

== Film Credits ==
Ercole Graziadei financed 50% of the costs of Vittorio De Sica's film Bicycle Thieves.

== Main writings ==
- Persone. Mondadori, 1966.
