= Woman Like Me (short story collection) =

1940 short story collection by Curzio Malaparte

- Author: Curzio Malaparte
- Original title: Donna come me
- Translator: Robin Monotti Graziadei
- Language: Italian
- Publisher: Mondadori
- Publication date: 1940
- Publication place: Italy
- English publication date: 2007
- Pages: 142

Woman Like Me (Italian: Donna come me) is a 1940 short story collection by the Italian writer Curzio Malaparte.

== Contents ==
The book contains the following stories:

- "Woman Like Me"
- "Almost Murder"
- "The Living Tree"
- "The Enchanted City"
- "Dog Like Me"
- "The Wounded Sea"
- "City Like Me"
- "Sunset over the Lake"
- "Day Like Me"
- "Landscape with Bicycle"
- "Earth Like Me"
- "Goethe and My Father"
- "Saint Like Me"

== Publication ==
Mondadori published the book in Italy in 1940. It was published in English in 2007 by Troubador in Leicester, translated and introduced by Robin Monotti Graziadei.

== Reception ==
Upon the publication in Italy, the critic Giovanni Pischedda of Corriere dell'Abruzzo called the book narcissistic and wrote about the tension between its author and narrative persona: "Malaparte does not want his artistic creations to show every aspect of himself, because from his perspective it would be a crying shame to miss out on the aesthetic pleasure of viewing himself in the mirror of the reflection which is seen by the reader." Oscar Sacchetti of Il Frontespizio wrote that the book suffered from not being concrete enough: "You can use a dream or a fantasy as a starting point, but this has to lead to something more tangible when you have ambitions like those of Malaparte—which are always open and declared—to transform dreams into reality. If not, you end up journeying through a world of elusive shadows and spectres." The Malaparte scholar William Hope calls the book "whimsical" and analyzes it as an example of how Malaparte played around with his author persona, autobiographical details and Italian cultural codes.
