= Elizabeth Marmur =

British actress (born 1970)

- Born: 27 April 1970 (age 56); North London, England
- Education: Royal Central School of Speech and Drama
- Occupations: Actor; artist
- Years active: 1989–2009
- Known for: Peep Show
- Website: marmur.co.uk

Elizabeth Marmur (born 27 April 1970) is an English former actress and artist. She is best known for playing Toni in the first two series of Peep Show (2003–2004).

== Early life ==
Elizabeth Marmur was born on 27 April 1970 in North London to a Jewish family. Her father, Dow, was a rabbi and a leading figure in the Reform Jewish Movement (he was born in Poland in 1935 and died in 2022). Her family moved to Canada when she was a teenager. She would return to the UK to attend Royal Central School of Speech and Drama, where she starting working as an actress.

== Career ==
Marmur's biggest role was in Peep Show as Toni, the neighbour to main characters Mark Corrigan and Jeremy Usborne. She appeared in the first two series from 2003 to 2004. She stopped acting in 2009 and became a qualified speech and language therapist.

Marmur, who had painted as a young adult, began painting again during lockdown in 2020. Since then, she has painted full time, and in September 2024 she held her first solo art exhibition.

== Filmography ==
- Degrassi Junior High — Cindi — two episodes — 1989
- Forever Knight — Denise Fort — one episode — 1992
- Street Legal — Jennifer Payne — one episode — 1993
- Lifeline to Victory — Ann Conwell — film — 1993
- Side Effects — Dr. Isabel St. John — three episodes — 1996
- Kung Fu: The Legend Continues — Kathy Markham — one episode — 1996
- Neverwhere — Jessica — four episodes — 1996
- Big Bad World — Dido — one episode — 1999
- Real Woman II — Amanda Bowen — two episodes — 1999
- Blood — Heather Dyson — film — 2000
- Black Books — Sarah — one episode — 2000
- High Stakes — Emily Hatton — three episodes — 2001
- My Family — Dental assistant — one episode — 2001
- Attachments — Katherine McGuire — three episodes — 2000—2001
- Anazapta — Joan — film — 2002
- Peep Show — Toni — eight episodes — 2003—2004
- Final Demand — Phillip's PA — film — 2003
- Seven Journeys in the American West — Mattie Oblinger — film — 2004
- Coupling — Jill — two episodes — 2000—2004
- Holby City — Dr. Miford (2005) / Monica Keppel (2008) — two episodes — 2005—2008
- According to Bex — Fiona — one episode — 2005
- The Robinsons — Zara — one episode — 2005
- Doctors — Judy Shea (2006) / Emily Amiel (2008) — seven episodes — 2006—2008
- Mayo — Faith Loxley — one episode — 2006
- Sold — Jenny — one episode — 2007
- Scoop — Muriel van den Plank — one episode — 2009
