= Antonio Graziadei =

Italian academic and politician

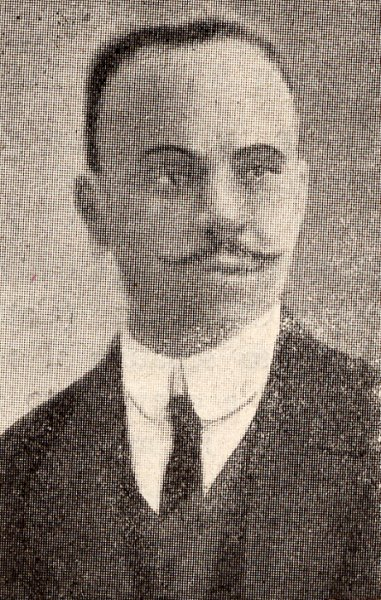

Count Antonio Graziadei (5 January 1872 – 10 February 1953), also known as Tonio, was an Italian academic and politician. One of the co-founders of the Italian Communist Party, he was Professor of Political Economy at the Universities of Cagliari and Parma and a member of the Italian Parliament from 1910 to 1926. In 1928 he went on a self-imposed exile to France to escape fascism. After World War II he taught at the University of Rome.

== Biography ==
He was born into an old aristocratic and conservative family. Despite his class origins, Graziadei, still very young, embraced the cause of the working classes and joined the Italian Socialist Party as early as 1893. In his native Imola, he met Andrea Costa, the first socialist parliamentarian in the history of Italy.

When Costa died, Graziadei replaced him in the Chamber of Deputies in 1910. At that time, he was aligned with the extreme right-wing of the PSI together with Leonida Bissolati, but unlike the latter he was able to avoid being expelled from the party in 1912.

When the First World War broke out, he positioned himself as a maximalist socialist, and in 1921, he was among the founders of the Communist Party of Italy (PCd'I), autonomous both from the Ordinovist group around the review L'Ordine Nuovo of Antonio Gramsci, and from the Amadeo Bordiga group. Within the Pcd'I he immediately placed himself on the right of Angelo Tasca, only for Tasca himself to distance himself from him. From 5 March 1923 until the summer of 1924 he was a member of the Central Committee.

With the advent of the fascist dictatorship, he lost his seat as a deputy, suffered attacks and confinement, and finally saw himself excluded from the university environment.

Expelled from the PCd'I in 1928 because of his Marxist revisionism, he nevertheless continued throughout the 1930s to publish his books and articles on economics.

After the collapse of the Fascist dictatorship, he was made a member of the Consulta Nazionale and obtained readmission to the PCI.

As a teacher and economist, he was one of the most brilliant minds of his generation. Although a convinced Marxist in politics, he was on the other hand unorthodox in the field of Marxian economics, most notably regarding the concept of the labor theory of value.

== Main writings ==
- Il Capitale tecnico e la teoria classico socialista del valore, Università di Bologna, Facoltà di Giurisprudenza, tesi di laurea, 1895.
- La produzione capitalistica, Torino, Bocca, 1899.
- Quantità e prezzi di equilibrio fra domanda ed offerta, Imola, 1918.
- Prezzo e sovrapprezzo nell'economia capitalistica: critica alla teoria del valore di Carlo Marx, Milano, Società editrice Avanti, 1923.
- La teoria del valore ed il problema del capitale "costante" (tecnico), Roma, Maglione e Strini, 1926.
- Capitale e salari, Milano, Monanni, 1928.
- La rente et la propriété de la terre (Critiques aux théories de Marx), Paris, Marcel Rivière, 1931.
- Le capital et la valeur: critique des théories de Marx, Paris, Pichon et Durand-Auzias, Lausanne, Rouge, 1936.
- Il risparmio, lo sconto bancario e il debito pubblico, Milano, Bocca, 1941.
- Le teorie sull'utilità marginale e la lotta contro il marxismo, Milano, Bocca, 1943.
- Le teorie sulla produttività marginale e la lotta contro il marxismo, Milano, Bocca, 1946.
- Il salario e l'interesse nell'equilibrio economico, Roma, Edizioni dell'Ateneo, 1949.
- Memorie di trent'anni 1890–1920, Roma, Rinascita, 1950.
