= Mickey Fisher (screenwriter) =

American writer and producer

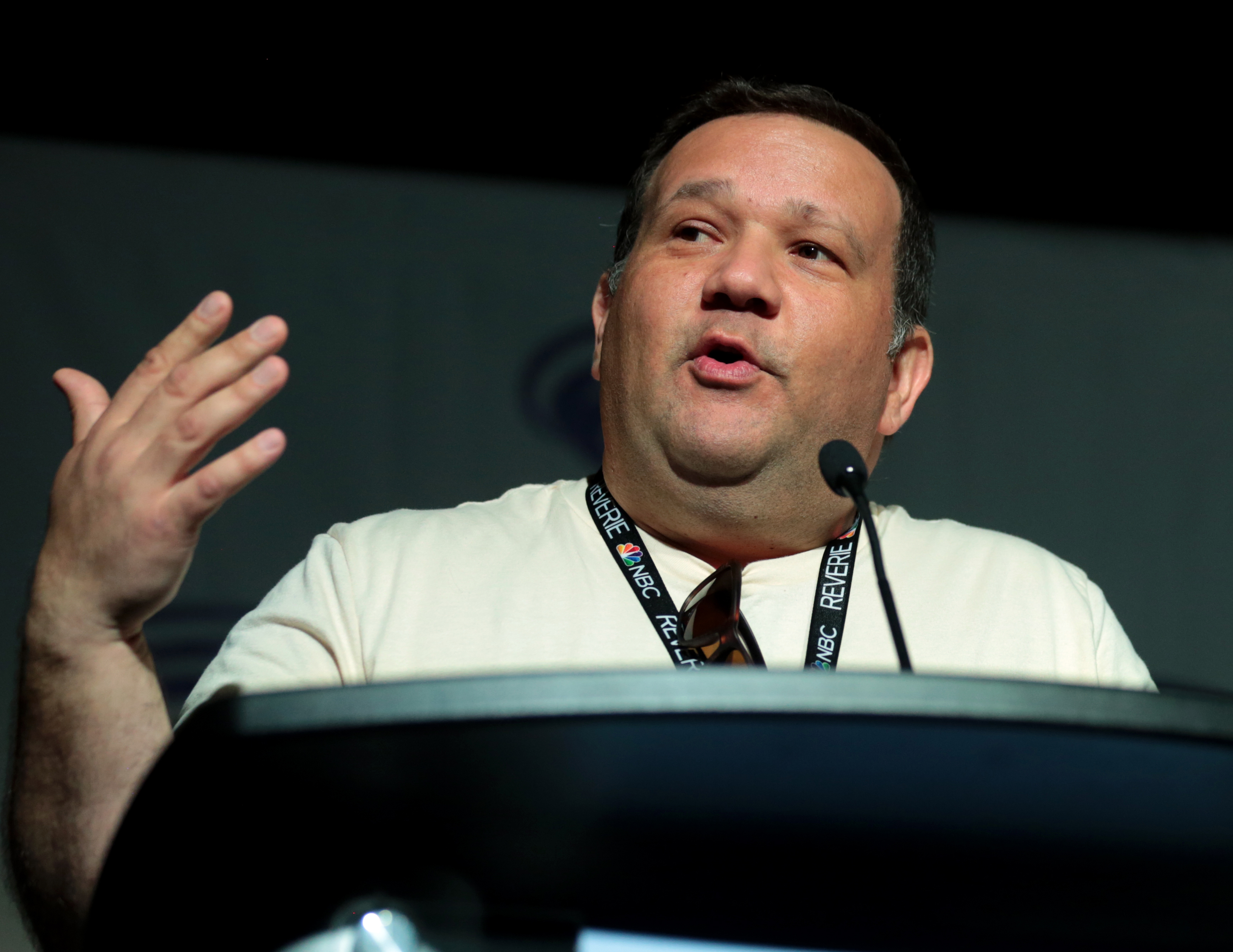
- Fisher in 2018
- Born: United States
- Occupations: Screenwriter; television producer

Mickey Fisher is an American television and film screenwriter and producer. He is best known as the creator of the CBS science fiction series Extant.

== Early life ==
Fisher grew up in Ironton, Ohio. Having originally trained as an actor, studying Musical Theater at The University of Cincinnati’s College Conservatory of Music, Fisher worked odd jobs to support his writing. These included directing theatre, teaching acting classes to children, accompanying a touring production of Annie to sell merchandise and as a promoter for the Spyder motorcycle.

== Career ==
In 2013, having previously made low budget shorts and features, Fisher submitted his science fiction pilot Extant to the TrackingB TV Pilot Contest. His script earned a finalist slot, and got him representation. The story revolves around astronaut Molly Woods (played in the final TV series by Halle Berry) who returns home to her family inexplicably pregnant after 13 months in outer space on a solo mission.

On August 7, 2013, CBS announced that it had placed a 13-episode straight-to-series order, bypassing the traditional pilot stage. Steven Spielberg served as one of the executive producers. Production began in Los Angeles on February 10, 2014. The series was broadcast in the United States on the CBS television network, and was a production of Amblin Television.

Fisher then worked as a staff writer on The Strain in 2017. He would reunite with Amblin on Reverie, a science fiction drama television series for NBC. The first season of 10 episodes premiered on May 30, 2018, on NBC. It was cancelled after one series.

Fisher also worked on the docudrama series Mars for National Geographic, and produced Amazon's Jack Ryan. On December 15, 2022, it was announced Fisher was developing a sci-fi medical drama, from Joshua Troke, for NBC and Justin Lin.
