= List of awards and nominations received by Halle Berry =

Halle Berry awards and nominations
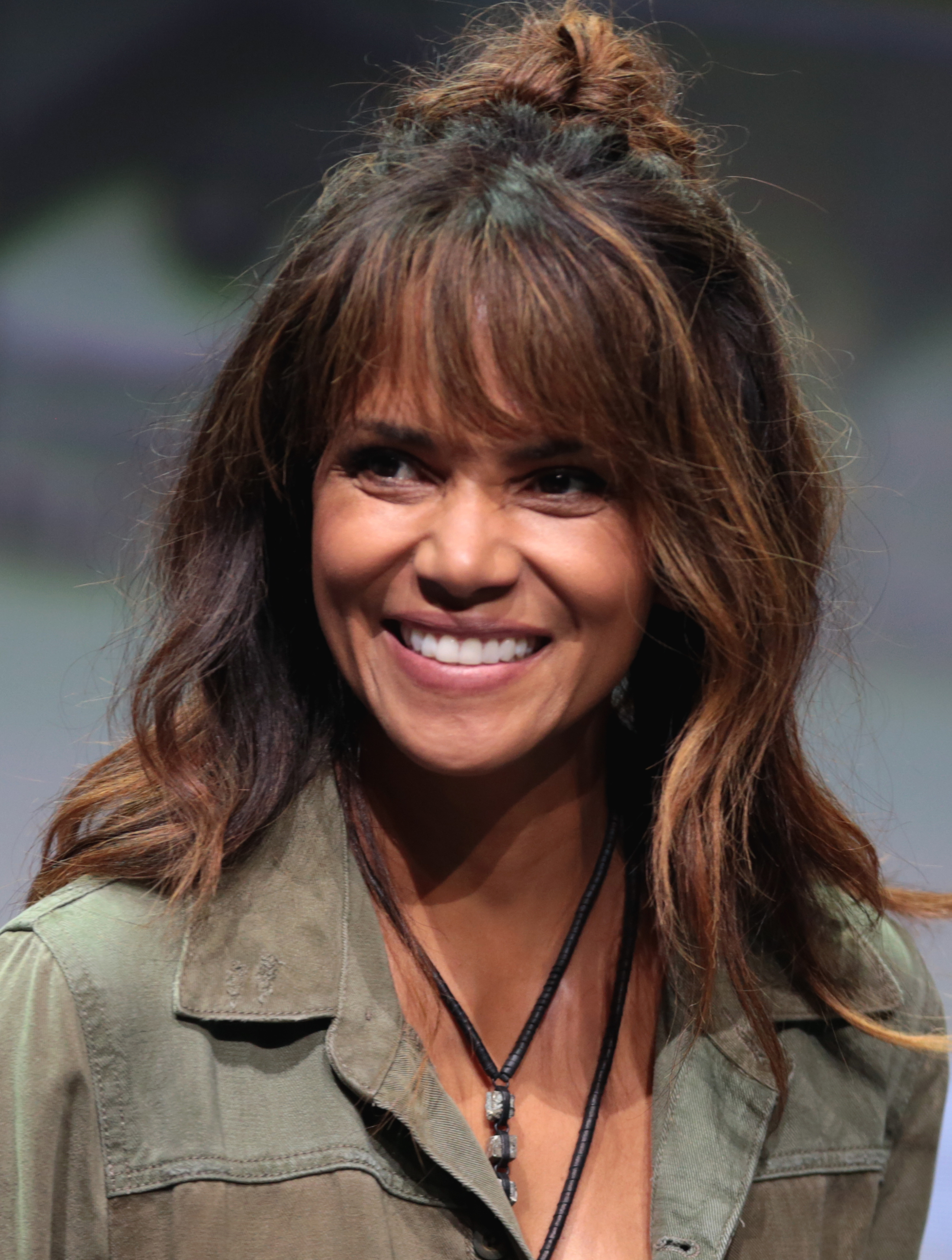
- Berry at the 2017 San Diego Comic-Con
Awards and nominations
Award	Wins	Nominations
Academy Awards	1	1
British Academy Film Awards	0	1
Primetime Emmy Awards	1	4
Golden Globe Awards	1	6
Producers Guild of America Awards	1	2
Screen Actors Guild Awards	2	2

Halle Berry is an American actress known for her roles in film and television. She made history becoming the first African-American woman to win the Academy Award for Best Actress for her role as widow in the rural south in Monster's Ball (2001). She received the Primetime Emmy Award for Outstanding Lead Actress in a Limited Series or Movie for her portrayal of Dorothy Dandridge in the HBO film Introducing Dorothy Dandridge (1999). She was further Emmy-nominated for her role as woman in the deep south in the ABC film Their Eyes Were Watching God (2005).

== Major associations ==
=== Academy Awards ===
Year	Category	Nominated work	Result	Ref.
2001	Best Actress	Monster's Ball	Won	

=== BAFTA Awards ===
British Academy Film Awards
Year	Category	Nominated work	Result	Ref.
2002	Best Film Actress in a Leading Role	Monster's Ball	Nominated	

=== Emmy Awards ===
Primetime Emmy Awards
Year	Category	Nominated work	Result	Ref.
2000	Outstanding Television Movie (as a producer)	Introducing Dorothy Dandridge	Nominated	
2000	Outstanding Lead Actress in a Limited Series or Movie	Introducing Dorothy Dandridge	Won	
2005	Outstanding Lead Actress in a Limited Series or Movie	Their Eyes Were Watching God	Nominated	
2005	Outstanding Television Movie (as a producer)	Lackawanna Blues	Nominated	

=== Golden Globe Awards ===
Year	Category	Nominated work	Result	Ref.
1999	Best Actress in a Miniseries or Motion Picture – Television	Introducing Dorothy Dandridge	Won	
1999	Best Television Limited Series, Anthology Series, or Motion Picture Made for Television (as a producer)	Introducing Dorothy Dandridge	Nominated	
2001	Best Actress in a Motion Picture – Drama	Monster's Ball	Nominated	
2005	Best Actress in a Miniseries or Motion Picture – Television	Their Eyes Were Watching God	Nominated	
2005	Best Television Limited Series, Anthology Series, or Motion Picture Made for Television (as a producer)	Lackawanna Blues	Nominated	
2010	Best Actress in a Motion Picture – Drama	Frankie & Alice	Nominated	

=== Producers Guild of America Awards ===
Year	Category	Nominated work	Result	Ref.
2006	David L. Wolper Award for Outstanding Producer of Long-Form Television	Lackawanna Blues	Nominated	
2006	Celebration of Diversity Award	Herself	Honored	

=== Screen Actors Guild Awards ===
Year	Category	Nominated work	Result	Ref.
2000	Outstanding Actress in a Miniseries or Television Movie	Introducing Dorothy Dandridge	Won	
2002	Outstanding Actress in a Leading Role	Monster's Ball	Won	

== Miscellaneous awards ==
=== AARP Movies for Grownups Awards ===
Year	Category	Nominated work	Result	Ref.
2022	Best Actress	Bruised	Nominated	

=== American Film Institute ===
Year	Category	Nominated work	Result	Ref.
2001	Actress of the Year	Monster's Ball	Won	

=== Berlin International Film Festival ===
Year	Category	Nominated work	Result	Ref.
2001	Best Actress	Monster's Ball	Won	

=== BET Awards ===
Year	Category	Nominated work	Result	Ref.
2002	Best Actress	Monster's Ball	Won	
2003	Best Actress	Die Another Day	Nominated	
2004	Best Actress	X2	Won	
2005	Best Actress	Catwoman	Nominated	
2008	Best Actress	Perfect Stranger	Won	
2011	Best Actress	Frankie & Alice	Nominated	
2013	Best Actress	The Call	Nominated	

=== Black Reel Awards ===
Year	Category	Nominated work	Result	Ref.
2002	Outstanding Actress	Monster's Ball	Won	
2004	Outstanding Actress	Gothika	Nominated	
2013	Outstanding Actress	Cloud Atlas	Nominated	
2014	Outstanding Actress	The Call	Nominated	
2022	Outstanding Actress	Bruised	Nominated	
2022	Outstanding Emerging Director	Bruised	Nominated	
2022	Outstanding Director	Bruised	Nominated	

=== Blockbuster Entertainment Awards ===
Year	Category	Nominated work	Result	Ref.
1997	Executive Decision	Favorite Actress – Adventure/Drama	Won	

=== Celebration of Cinema and Television ===
Year	Category	Nominated work	Result	Ref.
2021	Career Achievement Award		Won	

=== Chicago Film Critics Association ===
Year	Category	Nominated work	Result	Ref.
1992	Best Supporting Actress	Jungle Fever	Nominated	
1992	Most Promising Actress	Jungle Fever	Nominated	

=== Golden Raspberry Awards ===
Year	Category	Nominated work	Result	Ref.
2005	Worst Actress	Catwoman	Won	
2014	Worst Actress	The Call	Nominated	
2014	Worst Actress	Movie 43	Nominated	

=== Kids' Choice Awards ===
Year	Category	Nominated work	Result	Ref.
2015	Favorite Female Action Star	X-Men: Days of Future Past	Nominated	

=== MTV Movie & TV Awards ===
Year	Category	Nominated work	Result	Ref.
1993	Best Breakthrough Performance	Boomerang	Won	
1993	Most Desirable Female	Boomerang	Won	
1995	Most Desirable Female	The Flintstones	Won	

=== NAACP Image Awards ===
Year	Category	Nominated work	Result	Ref.
1993	Outstanding Actress in a Motion Picture	Boomerang	Nominated	
1995	Outstanding Actress in a Television Movie, Mini-Series, or Dramatic Special	Alex Haley's Queen	Won	
1996	Outstanding Actress in a Television Movie, Mini-Series, or Dramatic Special	Solomon & Sheba	Nominated	
1996	Losing Isaiah	Outstanding Actress in a Motion Picture	Nominated	
1999	Outstanding Actress in a Television Movie, Mini-Series, or Dramatic Special	The Wedding	Nominated	
1999	Outstanding Actress in a Motion Picture	Bulworth	Nominated	
2000	Outstanding Actress in a Television Movie, Mini-Series, or Dramatic Special	Introducing Dorothy Dandridge	Won	
2002	Outstanding Actress in a Motion Picture	Swordfish	Won	
2003	Outstanding Supporting Actress in a Motion Picture	Die Another Day	Won	
2004	Outstanding Actress in a Motion Picture	Gothika	Nominated	
2006	Outstanding Actress in a Television Movie, Mini-Series, or Dramatic Special	Their Eyes Were Watching God	Nominated	
2008	Outstanding Actress in a Motion Picture	Things We Lost in the Fire	Nominated	
2011	Outstanding Actress in a Motion Picture	Frankie & Alice	Won	
2013	Outstanding Actress in a Motion Picture	Cloud Atlas	Nominated	
2014	Outstanding Actress in a Motion Picture	The Call	Nominated	
2018	Outstanding Actress in a Motion Picture	Kidnap	Nominated	
2022	Outstanding Independent Motion Picture	Bruised	Nominated	
2022	Outstanding Actress in a Motion Picture	Bruised	Nominated	

=== National Board of Review ===
Year	Category	Nominated work	Result	Ref.
2002	Monster's Ball	Best Actress	Won	

=== People's Choice Awards ===
Year	Category	Nominated work	Result	Ref.
2006	Favorite Female Movie Star		Nominated	
2006	Favorite Movie Star	X-Men: The Last Stand	Won	
2007	Favorite Female Movie Star		Nominated	

=== PRISM Awards ===
Year	Category	Nominated work	Result	Ref.
2011	Performance in a Feature Film	Frankie & Alice	Won	

=== Satellite Awards ===
Year	Category	Nominated work	Result	Ref.
2022	Best First Feature	Bruised	Won	

=== Saturn Award ===
Year	Category	Nominated work	Result	Ref.
2014	Best Actress	The Call	Nominated	

=== Teen Choice Awards ===
Year	Category	Nominated work	Result	Ref.
2013	Choice Movie Actress: Drama	The Call	Nominated	
2014	Choice Movie: Sci-Fi/Fantasy Actress	X-Men: Days of Future Past	Nominated	

=== Women Film Critics Circle ===
Year	Category	Nominated work	Result	Ref.
2021	Courage in Acting Award		Won	
