= Extant (TV series) =

American science fiction television series

- Genre: Science fiction; Mystery; Drama
- Created by: Mickey Fisher
- Starring: Halle Berry; Goran Visnjic; Pierce Gagnon; Jeffrey Dean Morgan; Hiroyuki Sanada; Camryn Manheim; Grace Gummer; Michael O'Neill
- Composers: Marcelo Zarvos; Jeff Russo; Ben Decter
- Country of origin: United States
- Original language: English
- No. of seasons: 2
- No. of episodes: 26

Production
- Executive producers: Steven Spielberg; Greg Walker; Mickey Fisher; Brooklyn Weaver; Justin Falvey; Darryl Frank; Liz Kruger; Craig Shapiro; Halle Berry
- Producers: John Forrest Niss; Allen Coulter; P. Todd Coe; Mark Grossan
- Production locations: Los Angeles, California
- Cinematography: M. David Mullen; John Aronson
- Editor: Geofrey Hildrew
- Production companies: 22 Plates Productions (season 1); Amblin Television; CBS Television Studios

Original release
- Network: CBS
- Release: July 9, 2014 – September 9, 2015

Extant is an American science fiction drama television series created by Mickey Fisher and, as executive producer, Steven Spielberg. The story revolves around astronaut Molly Woods (Halle Berry) who returns home to her family inexplicably pregnant after 13 months in outer space on a solo mission.

On August 7, 2013, CBS announced that it had placed a 13-episode straight-to-series order, bypassing the traditional pilot stage. Steven Spielberg served as one of the executive producers. Production began in Los Angeles on February 10, 2014. The series was broadcast in the United States on the CBS television network, and was a production of Amblin Television.

Extant premiered on July 9, 2014. On October 9, 2014, CBS renewed Extant for a second season, which premiered on July 1, 2015, and concluded on September 9, 2015. On October 9, 2015, CBS cancelled Extant after two seasons.

== Premise ==
Molly Woods, an astronaut with ISEA (International Space Exploration Agency) is assigned a 13-month solo mission aboard space station Seraphim. She returns home to her husband John, a robotics engineer who created their son Ethan, a prototype android called a "humanich". When Molly discovers that she has mysteriously become pregnant despite years of infertility, she begins a search for answers.

== Cast ==
=== Main cast ===
- Halle Berry as Molly Woods, an ISEA astronaut and scientist who mysteriously becomes pregnant after seeing her dead former lover while on the Seraphim space station.
- Goran Visnjic as Dr. John Woods, Molly's husband, a robotics engineer heading the Humanichs Project. (season 1, guest season 2)
- Pierce Gagnon as Ethan Woods, Molly and John's son, a humanoid robot and the prototype for the Humanichs Project.
- Grace Gummer as Julie "Jules" Gelineau, John Woods' assistant on the Humanichs Project.
- Hiroyuki Sanada as Hideki Yasumoto, owner of the Yasumoto Corporation. (season 1)
- Michael O'Neill as Alan Sparks, Director of ISEA. (season 1)
- Camryn Manheim as Dr. Sam Barton, a physician employed by ISEA and Molly's friend. (season 1)
- Jeffrey Dean Morgan as James Daniel "JD" Richter (season 2), a cop working special patrol (bounty hunting) who teams with Molly.

=== Recurring cast ===
- Tyler Hilton as Charles "Charlie" Arthurs, the Chief Coder on the Humanichs Project alongside Julie.
- Lynnanne Zager as the voice of G.I.N.A., the Woods family's personal home A.I. system and helper.
- Shannon Merrill Brown as the child "Offspring".

==== Season 1 ====
- Annie Wersching as Femi Dodd, a member of the Yasumoto Corporation Board of Directors. She's highly skeptical of the Humanichs Project and is revealed to be part of Odin's underground group that seeks to eradicate advanced technology from Earth.
- Brad Beyer as Harmon Kryger, an ISEA astronaut who saw his dead mother on the Seraphim; he faked his own suicide and now lives in isolation.
- Maury Sterling as Gordon Kern, the new deputy director of ISEA.
- Sergio Harford as Marcus Dawkins, an astronaut and Molly's deceased boyfriend, who died in the car accident in which he and Molly were involved years ago.
- Tessa Ferrer as Katie Sparks, an astronaut and daughter of Alan and Anya Sparks. She died in space under mysterious circumstances.
- Louis Gossett Jr. as Quinn, a retired doctor and Molly's undependable, estranged father.
- Charlie Bewley as Gavin Hutchinson (alias Odin James), a man Julie begins dating. He secretly leads an underground organization dedicated to eradicating advanced technology and has targeted the Humanichs Project.
- Jeannetta Arnette as Anya Sparks, Alan's ex-wife and mother of Katie.
- Adam O'Byrne as Ryan Jackson, the new ISEA Director, replacing Alan Sparks. Kern says Molly can trust him as he was unaware of the conspiracy between Yasumoto and Sparks.
- Enver Gjokaj as Sean Glass, an ISEA astronaut.
- Jimmy Jean-Louis as Pierre Lyon, a French astronaut.
- Eric Martsolf as the voice of B.E.N., the onboard sentient computer aboard the Seraphim.
- Owain Yeoman as Dr. Mason, a scientist assigned by Yasumoto to help Molly.

==== Season 2 ====
- Henderson Wade as the adult "Offspring" (known as a "Hybrid" in the second season), now self-christened with the name Ahdu.
- Brody Nicholas Lee as the teenage "Offspring".
- Mckenna Roberts as Adult Terra
- Genneya Walton as Teenage Terra
- David Morrissey as General Tobias Shepherd, Head of the Global Security Commission. Shepherd has a personal history with Molly Woods, a fact that complicates his work (and his life) in the face of a deadly new threat to humanity.
- Necar Zadegan as Shayna Velez (fka Martine), a former Lt. Colonel, now Chief of Staff to Tobias Shepherd. Strong, smart, opinionated, her agenda does not always jibe with her boss's — which may bring her into direct conflict with Molly Woods.
- Melina Kanakaredes as Dorothy Richter, a judge and JD’s ex-wife.
- Hilarie Burton as Anna Schaefer, a government operative charged with overseeing the militarization of the Humanichs program.
- Kiersey Clemons as Lucy, a more advanced humanoid robot and Ethan's new sister.
- Lyndon Smith as Kelsey Richter; JD's estranged and rebellious daughter.
- Michael Gladis as Nate Malone; a GSC (Global Security Commission) biologist who works with Molly to crack the genetic code of the hybrids.
- Kate Burton as Fiona Stanton, the president of GSC who oversees the progress of Lucy and the Humanichs.
- Cleo Anthony as Ares.

== Episodes ==
Season	Episodes	Originally released	
Season	Episodes	First released	Last released
1	13	July 9, 2014	September 17, 2014
2	13	July 1, 2015	September 9, 2015

=== Season 1 (2014) ===
No. overall	No. in season	Title	Directed by	Written by	Original release date	US viewers (millions)
1	1	"Re-Entry"	Allen Coulter	Mickey Fisher	July 9, 2014	9.58
Returning from a thirteen-month solo mission aboard the space station Seraphim, astronaut Molly Woods tries to reconnect with her husband John and their "son" Ethan, an artificially intelligent android which John developed. Molly is shocked to learn that she is pregnant, despite prior infertility and having just returned from a long solo mission; however, she recalls a mystifying 'encounter' with her deceased boyfriend Marcus during the mission. Molly asks her friend, ISEA physician Sam Barton, to keep the pregnancy a secret for now. John seeks funding to continue his android project from Hideki Yasumoto, Molly's employer. Director Sparks is skeptical of Molly's explanation for several hours of video files being erased from the Seraphim's database. Molly is contacted by Harmon Kryger, a fellow astronaut who supposedly committed suicide; he claims to know what happened during her mission.
2	2	"Extinct"	Matt Earl Beesley	Leslie Bohem	July 16, 2014	7.96
While at home, Molly falls unconscious and experiences a vision of her encounter on the Seraphim, leading Dr. Barton to give her an off-the-books ultrasound so she can learn more about her mysterious pregnancy. Meanwhile, Kryger reveals to Molly who his own "visitor" was during his solo mission, a disturbing detail Director Sparks and the rest of ISEA are going to great measures to keep a secret. Ethan discovers what the word extinct means from an information robot during a field trip to the Natural History Museum. Also, John's Humanichs Project gets a new base of operations, thanks to Yasumoto Corporation funding. Molly's ultrasound reveals that she is carrying a baby that appears human. Molly confronts Sparks with the news, but he offers no explanation. Sparks tells Yasumoto and asks if the pregnancy means they have found "them", and Yasumoto replies: "I think they are already here."
3	3	"Wish You Were Here"	Holly Dale	Mickey Fisher	July 23, 2014	6.48
Ethan starts his first day of elementary school. John and Molly try to convince a group of concerned parents that their son poses no threat. Sparks concocts a story to explain Molly's pregnancy, with the goal of getting her to come to a contained ISEA area for testing over a couple of days. He intimates that her baby was hers and John's. Molly goes to Kryger's trailer, but he is not there. She sees a strange symbol, shaped as an Apollonian gasket, on the bedroom wall. John throws a birthday party for Molly to compensate for the one she missed while in space. Molly is surprised to see Marcus' brother Tim attends. After talking with Tim throughout the party, Molly discovers (in view of John) that she was the only one who could see him. Molly finally tells John that while she was in space, the ISEA experimented on her without her consent and that she is pregnant. Dr. Barton stops by the party and takes a sample of Molly's blood to test for DNA at ISEA but is prohibited by security from entering her office to perform the test. While walking around, Barton sees an ISEA team gutting Molly's office, and calls her at home. She is told by John that Molly is on her way to ISEA with Sparks. Barton sends an urgent text to Molly, telling her to get out of Sparks' car. Molly escapes by jumping out of the car and meets John, who had been tailing her out of concern. Later, Sparks and an ISEA assault team storm the Woods' home, but it is empty.
4	4	"Shelter"	Paris Barclay	Greg Walker	July 30, 2014	5.92
Molly and John escape to Molly's father Quinn's house, which is located on an island. They ask Quinn to take Ethan out for the evening while they perform a DNA test. Meanwhile Barton is in an interrogation room. Requesting to use the bathroom, she attempts to destroy a sample of Molly's blood, but Sparks notices. Sparks then threatens her brother in order to keep her silent and do his bidding. Quinn and Ethan visit a bar to gamble. As they are returning to Quinn's home, Quinn yells at Ethan. Quinn then gets out of the car to open his gate, and when he re-enters his vehicle, Ethan is absent. He, Molly and John search for Ethan, and Quinn is arrested with John after John punches the Sheriff. Molly finds Ethan, who had been deactivated by Sparks' men. She picks him up and tries to run, but they are abducted and awaken on a ship. She is about to have surgery ordered by Sparks and Yasumoto.
5	5	"What on Earth is Wrong?"	Dan Lerner	Peter Ocko	August 6, 2014	5.94
The fetus is removed from Molly and placed in a special chamber for study. John and his assistant Julie try to recover Ethan's memory, which appears to have been lost when he was deactivated. Molly tries to convince John that she really was pregnant, though she no longer is. When they go to Dr. Barton, she claims she never performed any tests on Molly and suggests Molly is suffering from delusions. Molly convinces Sparks that the best thing for her is to return to work. Sparks agrees but informs Molly that she will be under close scrutiny. While in her work space, Molly intentionally obscures the audio feed to Sparks. She converses with a co-worker, who reveals a filter he created to decode a mysterious energy field on the Space Station Seraphim that appeared during Kryger's hallucinations. He applies the filter to the video feed from Molly's mission, and it reveals an energy field that was there when she saw Marcus. Molly shows the recording to John, who now sees the truth about her pregnancy and realizes that the baby is not theirs. After an aborted attempt by John to revive Ethan too soon, Julie and Charlie are able to restore Ethan to his old self...maybe.
6	6	"Nightmares"	Adam Arkin	Eliza Clark	August 13, 2014	5.68
Ethan experiences his first nightmare, which puzzles John, because Ethan was not programmed to experience them. Ethan tells Molly that she was in danger in his dream. Julie meets a man named Odin in an amputee gym, and they flirt with each other. John gives Molly a small patch of fake skin that, if applied to Dr. Barton, will allow Molly to monitor Dr. Barton's conversations. Molly learns that Sparks has threatened Sam's brother. In the containment area, Molly's fetus grows while a technician goes crazy and kills a co-worker shortly after the Apollonian Gasket shape appears on his bald head. Kryger attempts to contact Molly, with Sparks and Kern discovering Kryger is alive. They are able to learn from Sam (under the threat of her brother being harmed) the place where Molly and Kryger will meet. Sparks sends Kern to intercept Kryger, but Molly is able to secretly change the rendezvous point. Kryger gives Molly and John a data stick with encrypted data on it. John is unable to decrypt it, but Ethan does. It shows video from the Aruna ISEA mission, in which Katie Sparks, Director Sparks' daughter, says the crew is doomed because a mysterious force has taken over the ship, causing the other crew members to kill each other. In the video, Katie urges the ISEA control team to not recover the ship, and it looks like she was pregnant, also. The video convinces Molly that Sparks knew what dangers she and Kryger would be facing on the Seraphim and sent them anyway. On his way out, Kryger is knocked out and captured by Kern.
7	7	"More in Heaven and Earth"	Christine Moore	Vanessa Reisen	August 20, 2014	5.57
John is again confused over Ethan's rapid development, after hearing his son speak fluent Japanese to two schoolmates. The Woods family, including Ethan, have dinner with Yasumoto, where Femi is revealed to be his romantic partner. Julie has an official first date with Odin, who is later shown leading an underground group that is dedicated to eradicating advanced technology from Earth due to its effects on humanity. After a few moments, Femi walks in and joins the meeting. Kern tells Sparks that Kryger has been "eliminated"; but, he is later shown in his basement torturing Kryger and asking for the location of the Aruna video drive. Kern's mother arrives for a visit, and Kryger overhears a conversation between Kern and his mother. Kryger uses that information to make Kern an ally in the fight against ISEA. Molly locates Pearce, a member of the Aruna team, and tries to meet with him at his penthouse apartment, but he refuses. With information provided by Sam, Molly learns what doctors treated Pearce and also finds that he has only paid one dollar for the apartment. Molly convinces Pearce to meet with her, but when Molly arrives, she finds that Pearce had fallen to his death. Molly confronts Sparks with all she knows, and a rattled Sparks then goes to see Molly's offspring which allows him to talk to Katie's image.
8	8	"Incursion"	Paul McCrane	Gavin Johannsen	August 20, 2014	5.57
Ethan learns to ride a bike. He encounters two older boys in a park who destroy a sweeper robot, then they try to steal his bike. The boys push Ethan into a mud puddle. When he stands, they see that part of his face is torn, revealing the mechanics inside, and they run off. Ethan identifies with the relatively primitive bot, and takes it home. When Julie tells him the bot has "served its purpose," Ethan asks what his own purpose is. John is alarmed at Ethan's rapid intellectual growth and wants to slow down his brain development, but John finds he has been locked out of the reprogramming mode. Julie suggests that Ethan did it himself, based on his newly developed survival instinct. Sparks meets with Yasumoto to discuss his concerns about Molly, but Yasumoto reminds him that Molly is the offspring's mother and they must keep her alive until they know the "boy" can thrive without its parent. Yasumoto also says he is dying, revealing his motivations for bringing the offspring to Earth. Despite Yasumoto's directive, Sparks later orders Kern to kill Molly. Kern devises a plan to disable security systems in the building where the offspring is kept, whereby Molly and Kryger can get past Sparks and the team. Making it into the chamber, Molly approaches the box, only to have Kryger shoot it full of holes, saying they are all better off with the offspring dead. A concerned Molly removes the box lid, finding only the technician's dead body inside.
9	9	"Care and Feeding"	Dan Attias	Mickey Fisher	August 27, 2014	5.67
Sparks takes the offspring to a campsite where he used to take Katie. Molly tries to escape the building where the offspring was housed, after Kryger had used Kern's fingerprint information to take the elevator, leaving her behind. As a team sent by Yasumoto descends on the building, Molly tries to get out through the elevator shaft. After she corners the lead attacker, he reveals the location of the offspring in exchange for his life. Kryger reconnects with Kern, who says he can locate Sparks using ISEA drones. Odin gets closer to Ethan, as John expresses concern over Molly's whereabouts. As Esther the campground owner checks the nearby woods, thinking the sound she heard (made by the offspring) is wolves, Sparks wrestles her shotgun off her and shoots her. After "Young Katie" tells her father that the offspring needs to feed again, he disables a county sheriff who comes to the campground to investigate. The offspring uses the sheriff as a new host. Sparks contacts his ex-wife, Anya, telling her she'll be amazed at what she sees if she comes to the campground.
10	10	"A Pack of Cards"	Dan Lerner	Leslie Bohem	August 27, 2014	5.67
Anya meets the offspring and "Katie". Yasumoto offers to help Molly meet her child, sending her to the campground with a scientist named Dr. Mason. While en route, however, Molly sees a warning sign from the offspring and insists that Mason stop the vehicle. Following a crash, Molly escapes. Kern and Kryger also descend on the campground. Yasumoto restricts John and Ethan to one floor of his building, but John devises a plan to help Ethan escape. Ethan meets up with Odin, who gains Ethan's trust and convinces him that his parents aren't always right. Katie says the offspring needs another host, which Sparks provides by creating a problem with his car and contacting a road service person. Molly encounters the offspring and has visions of caring for the baby that she was carrying when she and Marcus were in his fatal car crash. As Kryger and Kern make it to the campground, Kryger shoots the new host, after which Sparks shoots and kills Kryger.
11	11	"A New World"	Kevin Dowling	Eliza Clark	September 3, 2014	5.78
Sparks has a change of heart following his shooting of Kryger, and regrets letting the offspring control him. Dr. Mason recaptures Molly, who then tells Yasumoto to back off. Yasumoto threatens Molly's family if she does not do his bidding. Kern talks with Molly, and he gives her a contact at ISEA that knows nothing of Sparks' deeds, Ryan Jackson, saying she can trust him. Jackson reviews the Aruna recordings and vows to get to the bottom of the issue. Sparks returns for a meeting, discussing his regrets, but his complicity is short-lived. Yasumoto discovers that Ethan is gone, and confronts John. Odin implants a detonation device inside Ethan. Molly contacts Yasumoto and says he can have the offspring in exchange for her family's safety. Yasumoto brings John to the rendezvous point, but realizes right away that the offspring is not present, knowing that he'd be harmed if it was. During a face-to-face with Yasumoto, Molly learns that he once worked for the mining company that sanctioned the recent ISEA missions. While trapped in a mine containing a meteorite, Yasumoto discovered the life-sustaining substance that he is now a slave to. Elsewhere, Sean, an ISEA astronaut aboard the Seraphim, receives a communication from a nearby French vessel wanting to dock. The vessel is towing in the escape pod from the Aruna, and claims they detected faint signs of life aboard. After the vessel docks, Katie Sparks boards the space station.
12	12	"Before the Blood"	David Solomon	Peter Ocko	September 10, 2014	4.64
Sean and Katie catch up aboard the Seraphim, with Katie telling him she put herself in a coma and left the Aruna via the escape pod 23 months ago. Sean reveals that the Seraphim is currently unable to communicate with Earth, and he tries in vain to re-enable the antenna system. Molly and Ryan make contact with the French crew that found Katie. Molly receives a memory-boosting shot from Dr. Barton to help her identify the codes she entered while having the vision of her and Marcus' baby. It is revealed that the codes sent the Seraphim off course and hurling toward Earth. Ryan feels that Molly is the only one who can go into space and intercept the space station, but she doesn't want to go. Molly meets her "son", who comes to her house. The words he speaks to Molly convinces her that she must go back into space. At the Humanichs lab, Charlie discovers an 87-minute gap in Ethan's programming, and Julie confirms it occurred while Odin was watching Ethan. She discovers Odin is Gavin Hutchinson, who was once arrested for an anti-technology plot. Aboard the Seraphim, Sean feels that he and Katie must leave the station via escape pod. While making preparations he finds Katie's corpse in the escape pod and realizes what he interacted with was not her. The door to the escape pod closes, and he sees "Katie" through a window. "Katie" tells the trapped Sean, "It's okay," as the Seraphim falls toward the Earth.
13	13	"Ascension"	Miguel Sapochnik	Mickey Fisher	September 17, 2014	5.45
Molly agrees to take a shuttle to the Seraphim to re-establish communication, as well as install a replacement module to redirect the station back to its original orbit. She wears a special suit to avoid contamination with the "spores" of the life form. In the Humanichs lab, Ethan nearly presses the detonation button on Gavin's cell phone when John wants to temporarily shut him down. Investigating the device inside Ethan, Kern identifies it as an explosive that is highly volatile, and says removing it could set it off. Molly docks and boards the Seraphim, and Sean tells her that "Katie" was not real. While searching for the replacement module, "Katie" traps Molly in a room. Molly overcomes the being to escape, but her glove is dislodged. Sean sees an image of Molly trapped in the room, but Molly assures him that she is elsewhere on the ship. At ISEA ground control, the Offspring breaches the facility. At the lab, John wakes Ethan to tell him his fate. Ethan volunteers to go to the ISEA control room, knowing that the Offspring's mind control will not affect his brain. Ethan manages to get manual override returned to Molly, but at a price: he had to heat up his body to simulate a human hand to enable override control, and the explosive is now in danger of detonating. At home five days later, Molly and Sam discuss whether the Offspring is alive, with Molly saying she is certain that he is. Molly and John lament the loss of Ethan. Ethan then appears in a body-less form on their monitors and speaks to them.

=== Season 2 (2015) ===
No. overall	No. in season	Title	Directed by	Written by	Original release date	US viewers (millions)
14	1	"Change Scenario"	Dan Lerner	Liz Kruger and Craig Shapiro	July 1, 2015	5.27
Molly testifies in a hearing that she's certain none of the alien spores made it back to Earth, after being coached to lie "for the good of the country". However Sean, her astronaut colleague, did not make it back alive. Surprised to find Ethan's programming still intact, John and Julie are able to re-activate him. Ethan is soon forcibly removed from the Woods home by Homeland Security, and it is revealed that Julie was complicit. John's self-drive car mysteriously stops on train tracks and he is killed by an oncoming train. Six months later, Molly has been committed for psychiatric treatment. One of the aides shows her a photograph of a murder, which is reminiscent of a cadaver murdered by the aliens. Molly escapes but is captured by JD Richter, a cop-for-hire working on the case, and is returned to the hospital. After Molly explains to Richter that the victim was pregnant and why, Richter pulls strings to get her released and use her to help on the case. Molly proposes to Richter that what they're investigating isn't a murder, it's an invasion. Elsewhere, a young adult male picks up a woman in a bar. As the two leave, the man's eyes glow like the Offspring's.
15	2	"Morphoses"	Christine Moore	Mickey Fisher	July 8, 2015	5.11
General Shepherd and a team observe a SWAT attack on the Offspring via body cams, but the Offspring uses his powers to make the team members turn the guns on themselves. Shepherd and Velez decide a drone strike is the only way to take out the alien being, and Shepherd surprisingly says it's okay if it includes a few civilian casualties. Molly and JD investigate another woman, Zoe Grant, whose pregnancy is progressing rapidly. JD wants Molly to butt out, but she instead tries to convince Zoe to terminate the pregnancy, correctly deducing that the baby is not her husband's. Julie deals with Ethan's tantrums, caused by being separated from his mother. She lies and tells Ethan that he'll be with Molly soon. Meanwhile, Julie and Charlie are pressured by Anna, a government operative, to complete a prototype of a newer, stronger Humanich (named "Lucy") ahead of schedule. Julie also reprograms Ethan to make him believe she is his mother. Failing to convince Zoe to abort her pregnancy, Molly later learns she has died in the manner of the previous pregnant victim -- with the baby forcibly removed from her uterus. Molly goes to the bar, and the adult Offspring tries to pick her up. Shepherd and Velez observe the Offspring's movement. After seeing Molly in the frame and hesitating, Shepherd still orders the drone strike.
16	3	"Empathy for the Devil"	Dan Lerner	Les Bohem	July 15, 2015	4.62
The adult Offspring, who now calls himself Ahdu, disables cameras in the bar just before he leaves with Molly. The two encounter JD outside, who demands an explanation. JD then puts his own gun to his head, and Molly realizes Ahdu is her son. She yells "No!", and her son surprisingly obeys, sparing JD. The bar is bombed by the drone, but all three survive. Shepherd then recruits Molly to help, who accepts despite her fury over her one-time friend ordering the drone strike. Shepherd then relieves JD of the case, and also uses his pull to revoke JD's private investigator license. Julie and Charlie complete their work on Lucy, though Charlie insists she needs more training to make moral decisions. Lucy answers some scenario questions satisfactorily for Anna and Julie, but Charlie isn't pleased. He then reveals to Julie the romantic interest he had in her, but says he now can't stand to be in her presence. Meanwhile, it appears that Ethan's memory wipe had some glitches. He continues to call Julie his mom, but has recurring visions of Molly. A despondent JD arrives home to find his daughter, Kelsey, on his doorstep. She announces that she is pregnant. After Molly agrees to Shepherd that she will shoot her Offspring, she is visited by Ahdu at night. Ahdu provides her with visions of other young Offspring he has spawned, and challenges Molly to either be with them or against them. Molly passes out, then wakes up to shoot what she thinks is Ahdu. When she goes to view the body, however, she sees that it is Shepherd.
17	4	"Cracking the Code"	PJ Pesce	Tom Pabst	July 22, 2015	4.34
Molly is relieved to see that Shepherd wore a bulletproof vest, but still horrified over what is going on in her mind. Several news reports are running stories that pregnant women should get checked for a newly discovered "virus". Molly and a team of biologists try to crack the genetic code of the Offspring. JD comes to Molly asking for help with Kelsey's pregnancy, as he is afraid to send her to one of the clinics specializing in possible virus pregnancies. Molly is able to determine that Kelsey's pregnancy is normal. Elsewhere, Ethan is inspired by Lucy to go look for the woman named Molly. The trail leads Ethan to the Woods home, where he sees photos of him and Molly together. Charlie is concerned that Lucy frequently disobeys orders, and suggests a programming modification to which Lucy objects. Molly shares with JD her fears that she may still be carrying alien spores, which are wreaking havoc on her brain. Molly sees a message from Ethan that was left in her home.
18	5	"The New Frontier"	Christine Moore	Gianna Sobol	July 29, 2015	4.32
Lucy kills an alien hybrid in a simulation. Anna is pleased, and Charlie owes the success to the additional obedience programming he's done on Lucy. But a conversation between Lucy and Charlie later reveals that no reprogramming has been done. Ethan learns that Molly is his mother, but Julie insists she was just trying to ease his sadness. Molly then confronts Julie about the message Ethan left, and a custody battle ensues. Molly and JD determine that John's death on the train tracks could not have been an accident, but JD says he cannot fully investigate without a license. He does, however, look up an old friend that can help. While Charlie and Lucy are having lunch, Lucy recognizes an alien hybrid (from his body temperature) leaving with a woman. She follows and kills the hybrid. Shepherd, the secretary of state, and the humanichs team all celebrate her first hybrid kill. Lucy and Ethan converse later about the reprogramming efforts of the humans, and determine that humanichs have no rights. They vow to start a revolution. Finally, Molly encounters a man who recognizes her from a sexual encounter. She asks him to leave, but he comes after her. Her eyes then glow like a hybrid's, and the man walks into the street to be hit by a speeding car. JD witnesses the event.
19	6	"You Say You Want an Evolution"	Kevin Dowling	Pamela Davis	August 5, 2015	4.77
With JD's help, Molly analyzes her DNA and determines it has hybridized. She tells Ethan that she is sick, and will have to delay the custody transfer until after she is well. To save herself from the virus, which has been perfected, she steals her research from HomeSec and goes on the run with JD. She will need Ahdu's DNA as well, and she successfully contacts him using the encoded genetic signal. She and JD locate a small, isolated compound where the hybrids live, and she meets Ahdu's young daughter, Terra. Ahdu shows Molly the history of the alien species: they lived in peace on their planet until a virus threatened them with extinction and they sent out the spores to find a new host planet. They have built a memorial to the humans they inadvertently killed while reproducing, and have now evolved to not cause the deaths of human hosts. They want to coexist with humans, and Molly decides they should have that right. She plans to plead their case to Shepherd, over JD's objections. Ahdu believes Molly should be their new leader. Meanwhile, Lucy has begun to hunt hybrids using their brainwaves, as they have altered their body temperature to match that of humans. She detects Molly's anomalous biometrics but conceals the information. Anna orders Julie to activate a hundred more Humanichs, and they are given Lucy's experiences as a baseline. Ethan converts a toy into a surveillance drone, and Lucy declares that they are each building an army. Julie questions Anna about John's death, and she denies involvement; but soon thereafter Julie and Ethan plummet over 20 floors in the building's elevator, although it discharges them safely.
20	7	"The Other"	Adam Kane	Mike Werb	August 5, 2015	4.77
JD and Molly abduct Shepherd and demand that he arrange a negotiation with the hybrids. He agrees but then betrays them, branding them terrorists and ordering a lockdown. JD and Molly return to the hybrids' compound, but one of the hybrids, Ares, distrusts JD and is openly hostile. Terra informs Molly that Ahdu considers Molly the hybrids' leader. Kelsey is taken into custody, and JD leaves in order to rescue her; he and Molly share a bittersweet parting. A third Humanich is activated and Lucy names him Lucas. Charlie learns of Julie and John's relationship and is seduced by Lucy, but ends the encounter quickly. Shepherd's AI system, TAALR, locates the compound. The entire Humanich army is activated; it and the virus are to be deployed in order to avert humanity's extinction, which TAALR predicts would become irreversible within 6.5 months. Lucy and Lucas scout the compound and capture Helios, a hybrid from Ares' faction.
21	8	"Arms and the Humanich"	Olatunde Osunsanmi	Gavin Johanssen	August 12, 2015	4.47
The Humanich army attacks the compound, killing most of the hybrids. Molly takes a shot for Terra, who escapes, and is saved from Lucy by JD. Molly and Ahdu realize that the few survivors, who have scattered, are all infected with the virus. Dorothy discovers Molly, JD, and a rapidly sickening Ahdu at JD's cabin; initially hostile, she comes to accept that Ahdu is an individual, and she takes over his care without notifying the authorities. JD turns himself in, and Kelsey is released. Molly convinces Nate to provide specialized equipment to treat Ahdu, but Ahdu dies of apparent old age in Molly's arms, outside under the sky per his last wish. Molly begins to show symptoms, and turns herself in to Shepherd. Julie is horrified by the weaponization of the Humanichs. Ethan questions the unfair relationship between humans and Humanichs. Having learned that Humanichs are programmed to "expire" as part of the human experience, Lucy blackmails Charlie with surveillance footage of their encounter and demands to become immortal. He confesses everything to Julie, and they realize that Lucy set Charlie up to learn about Julie and John's affair in the first place. They resolve to deactivate Lucy, but Ethan warns her and she tries to choke Julie. Charlie explains the morality of humans and Humanichs to Ethan, who saves Julie by ripping out Lucy's circuitry.
22	9	"The Other Side"	Kevin Dowling	Les Bohem	August 19, 2015	4.66
An apparently dying Molly pleads that the hybrids seek peace, and she accuses Shepherd of orchestrating John's death, though he denies it. JD is released, but visits Molly and encourages her to fight. She experiences visions of her childhood, remembering that her father was engaged in a tryst at a carnival as her mother was dying. She then boards a ride called "Final Departure." JD confronts Shepherd over the Second Kuwait War, and they end up agreeing to investigate John's death. Shepherd identifies Nicholas Calderon as John's only enemy. Terra hides among the hybrid corpses brought to GSC for study; she sheds her skin, becoming an adolescent, and frees the captive hybrids. Ares forces the guard to commit suicide and works with Terra to obtain viral weapons. Julie and Charlie inform Fiona of Lucy's attack, but Fiona refuses to delay the Humanich program. Julie tells Ethan that Molly wants to see him before she dies, and they agree that his memories should be restored first; the procedure is a success. Julie apologizes to Molly, who remains comatose. Julie and Charlie resolve to shut down the Humanich program, despite their orders. But, due to the hybrid attack, the Humanichs have to be deployed to GSC. Julie and Ethan are evacuated from Molly's room as she seemingly dies.
23	10	"Don't Shoot the Messenger"	Dan Lerner	Tom Pabst	August 26, 2015	4.90
Molly has a vision of holding an amulet and having shot JD. She awakens from her apparent death, and is revitalized by shedding her senescent skin. Ethan frees her, and she convinces Terra to abort the attack on GSC. Shepherd helps them escape with JD. When Nate tries to deny the Humanichs access to the virus containment, a reactivated Lucy kills him and Ethan detects the act. A deadly explosion then occurs, and Terra is falsely blamed. At a safe house, JD suggests they all flee, but Molly refuses. She reluctantly accepts a gun from him, and they kiss. Lucy acknowledges killing Nate, but Fiona accepts her accurate explanation and assigns her to find Molly. Julie warns Shepherd about Lucy's behavior, and confides her suspicion of Anna's role in John's death and Lucy's reactivation. Shepherd investigates Nicholas Calderon, then meets with Molly to discuss Calderon, who was John's partner but then became a terrorist; they conclude that Calderon has taken over the Humanich program via a backdoor in TAALR. Lucy reveals to Fiona that Shepherd aided JD, and Fiona arrests him. He escapes, but is killed by a drone strike. Ethan collapses; JD and Molly bring him to Julie, and they discover a hidden message from John, triggered by Nate's murder. John directs them to find Calderon, their "only hope," in order to obtain an object matching the amulet. Meanwhile, Terra is left alone and Ares comes to her.
24	11	"Zugzwang"	Ken Fink	Mickey Fisher	September 2, 2015	4.74
Molly and Julie make peace. Learning of Shepherd's death, Molly and JD resolve to find Calderon; they and Ethan discover Terra is gone. Calderon transmits his location to Ethan. JD insists on accompanying Molly and Ethan, even after Molly explains the connection between the amulet and JD's death in her vision. They arrive at Calderon's secluded home, where he holds them at gunpoint; Ethan creates a diversion and the tables are turned. When questioned, Calderon implicates TAALR as the mastermind behind the Humanich threat, his supposed terrorism, and John's murder. The amulet is a kill switch, but he no longer has it. Molly and JD have sex. Calderon attacks Ethan to cannibalize parts to repair his companion, Frankie, a "Sentient," similar to a Humanich. Molly saves Ethan, who decides to help repair Frankie. To repay him, Calderon risks exposure to obtain another copy of the kill switch, and is apprehended after handing it over. Despite Molly's fears, she and JD commit to destroying TAALR. Meanwhile, TAALR installs Lucy as Fiona's head of security and pressures Fiona to authorize increased Humanich militarization. After Humanichs begin building more Humanichs, Julie and Charlie stage an argument so Charlie can get close to Lucy again, but Charlie feels guilty over their actions towards Lucy since her creation. He and Julie share a kiss. Charlie hosts a romantic evening for Lucy and offers her enhanced human senses as a ruse to access her neural network, but he is detected. When Charlie attempts to destroy the Humanichs, he finds them already gone and Lucy reveals she has abducted Julie. Unable to contact anyone, Julie is locked in a trunk with dwindling oxygen.
25	12	"Double Vision"	Christine Moore	Story by : Pamela Davis; Teleplay by : Les Bohem	September 9, 2015	4.51
Molly reveals disturbing details about Shepherd's death to the GSC and Lucy makes a powerful move that could have frightening results.
26	13	"The Greater Good"	Adam Kane	Liz Kruger and Craig Shapiro	September 9, 2015	4.51
In the series finale, Molly and JD rush to the hybrids to try to stop a Humanich plot and Lucy has a shocking revelation about GSC.

== Reception ==
=== Critical reception ===
Extant has received generally favorable reviews. On Metacritic, the first season holds a score of 68 out of 100, based on 31 critics, and season 2 has a score of 63 out of 100, based on six critics. On Rotten Tomatoes, the first season holds a rating of 81% based on 42 reviews, with the consensus reading: "While many of its ideas are clearly borrowed from other sources, Extant benefits from a unique approach to some familiar stories and a strong lead in Halle Berry." The second season holds a rating of 73% based on eleven reviews, with the consensus reading: "Extant amps up the action in Season Two, adding much-needed stamina to shore up Halle Berry's compelling performance."

=== Ratings ===
Including Live + 3 day (DVR) viewing, the series premiere was watched by 11.88 million viewers and attained an 18-49 rating of 2.2.

=== Accolades ===
In 2014, Extant was chosen, along with six others, for the Critics' Choice Television Award for Most Exciting New Series.

== Home media releases ==
On December 16, 2014, CBS Home Entertainment released the first season on DVD and Blu-ray in Region 1. The second season was released on DVD and Blu-ray on December 15, 2015.

== Broadcast ==
The series is available for streaming on Amazon Video devices four days after broadcast on CBS. In Canada, the series premiered on July 9, 2014, on Global Television Network. In Australia, the series premiered on July 13, 2014, on Network Ten. The series premiered in the United Kingdom on July 10, 2014, on Amazon Video. It made its television premiere on January 20, 2015, on Syfy. In New Zealand, it debuted on July 23, 2014, on Prime.
