= Reverie (TV series) =

2018 American science fiction drama television series

- Genre: Drama; Techno-thriller
- Created by: Mickey Fisher
- Starring: Sarah Shahi; Dennis Haysbert; Jessica Lu; Sendhil Ramamurthy; Kathryn Morris
- Composers: W. G. Snuffy Walden; A. Patrick Rose; Noah Sorota
- Country of origin: United States
- Original language: English
- No. of seasons: 1
- No. of episodes: 10

Production
- Executive producers: Mickey Fisher; Brooklyn Weaver; Darryl Frank; Justin Falvey; Steven Spielberg; Ronald Bass
- Cinematography: Joseph E. Gallagher
- Camera setup: Single-camera
- Running time: 43 minutes
- Production companies: Extant Storytech; Cheap Theatrics Inc.; Energy Entertainment; Amblin Television; Universal Television

Original release
- Network: NBC
- Release: May 30 – August 8, 2018

Reverie is an American science fiction drama television series. The series was commissioned on May 12 and aired through August 8, 2018. The first season of 10 episodes premiered on May 30, 2018 on NBC.

On November 6, 2018, NBC canceled the series after one season.

== Premise ==
Former hostage negotiator Mara Kint, an expert on human behavior, takes a job saving people whose minds are lost in an advanced virtual-reality simulation, Reverie. In the process, Kint begins to work through a personal tragedy in her own past.

== Cast ==
=== Main ===
- Sarah Shahi as Mara Kint, an expert in human behavior and former hostage negotiator hired by Onira-Tech to intervene on behalf of patients trapped within Reverie. Having lost her sister and niece in a shooting, she also takes the opportunity to use Reverie as a means of dealing with the guilt she feels for failing to save them.
- Dennis Haysbert as Charlie Ventana, an ex-cop and Mara's former boss. As a senior security consultant and operations manager for Onira-Tech, he is responsible for involving her with Reverie.
- Jessica Lu as Alexis Barrett, an introverted programmer and the founder of Onira-Tech, whose research forms the foundation of Reverie. She also programmed Dylan, the artificial intelligence that manages Onira-Tech's systems and is modeled after her deceased brother.
- Sendhil Ramamurthy as Paul Hammond, the scientist and developer behind 2.0, the version of Reverie that Onira-Tech is currently preparing to sell to the public.
- Kathryn Morris as Monica Shaw, a Defense Department official with an interest in the use of Reverie for government purposes, and an occasional ally to Charlie and Mara.

=== Recurring ===
- Jon Fletcher as Oliver Hill, Alexis's former partner at Onira-Tech, who claims there is a systemic flaw affecting Reverie.
- Madeleine McGraw as Brynn, Mara's niece, who was murdered by her unstable father. She appears as a hallucination caused by her aunt's use of Reverie.
- Sam Jaeger as Dr. Chris Condera, a therapist and Mara's fiancé until she broke up with him in the aftermath of her family's murder.
- Gary Kraus as Leekly, a security guard at Onira- Tech, who secretly is working with Oliver Hill.

== Production ==
=== Development ===
- Production companies Universal Television and Amblin Television produced this series.
- Mickey Fisher was the creator and executive producer for this television series.
- Jaume Collet-Serra directed the first episode.
- Other executive producers / producers consist of Steven Spielberg, Tom Szentgyörgyi, Brooklyn Weaver, Darryl Frank and Justin Falvey.
- Cinematography by Joseph E. Gallagher.
- Some of the CGI Artists / Animators behind this production were Delano Athias, Tyrone Evans Clark, and Michael Capton.

== Episodes ==
No.	Title	Directed by	Written by	Original release date	U.S. viewers (millions)
1	"Apertus"	Jaume Collet-Serra	Mickey Fisher	May 30, 2018	2.88
Former hostage negotiator Mara Kint is approached by her former boss Charlie Ventana with a job offer: his employer, Onira-Tech, has developed a sophisticated virtual reality simulator called Reverie, capable of recreating anyone's deepest desires or memories. However, a number of people who have been testing the system have become addicted to it, causing them to fall into comas as their minds slowly become trapped within Reverie. Based on Mara's experience, Charlie asks her to enter Reverie and convince those afflicted to voluntarily return to the real world. The first subject, Tony Lenton, has placed himself in a reality where his deceased wife Naomi is alive, and refuses to leave until Mara uncovers the guilt he feels for the accident that killed Naomi, and uses her own experience of failing to save her sister Jamie and niece Brynn from Jamie's violent husband to convince him to let her go. Returning home, Mara throws away some alcohol and prescribed pills, but is then surprised by a hallucination of Brynn.
2	"Bond. Jane Bond."	Michael Katleman	Tom Szentgyörgyi	June 6, 2018	2.22
Mara gets a new patient: Rachel Kauffman (Ahna O'Reilly), who suffers from a rare heart defect, and who is moonlighting as a secret agent in her simulation; Paul explains that Rachel's reality is structured like a video game. He also informs Mara that the implant which allows her to enter Reverie can cause side effects, which include the hallucinations of Brynn. As Rachel's condition worsens, Mara reenters and learns that she is hunting for a criminal named Vater. However, when she presses for answers, Rachel forces her to leave at gunpoint. Through research, Mara theorizes that Vater is actually a representation of Rachel's father created by Reverie from her inner desires, and she asks Charlie to find him. Vater proves unable to answer any of Rachel's questions, which finally convinces her to leave Reverie. Charlie finds a witness who provides Rachel with her father's location, and she is reunited with his family. Mara hallucinates seeing Brynn again, and decides to try to interact with her.
3	"No More Mr. Nice Guy"	PJ Pesce	Ken Woodruff	June 13, 2018	2.32
Mara tries to bond with Brynn, though she worries about her own sanity. A woman named Amanda Hallo threatens to file a lawsuit against Onira-Tech for her husband Nate's (Ashley Zukerman) overuse of Reverie. Mara goes inside and finds that Nate has abandoned Amanda for a life of crime. Suspecting that he has a reason not to leave, Mara discovers that something has trapped him inside Reverie and will not let him escape. Paul brings her into his mind, revealing that the program is capable of learning and evolving based on the hidden desires of users, even recreating people from their memories. Alexis struggles with an upcoming presentation for Onira-Tech's investors, so Mara helps her retool her pitch. Charlie tracks down a burglar who Nate once confronted, but the police demand that Nate personally identify him. Mara convinces him to leave, and he identifies the man, finally conquering his fear of him. Mara assures Charlie that her hallucinations of Brynn are harmless. Later that night, while visiting the scene of her family's murder, Mara finds herself in a simulated world.
4	"Blue Is the Coldest Color"	Matt Earl Beesley	David Schulner	June 20, 2018	1.79
Mara nearly gets run over by a truck; a man saves her and introduces himself as Oliver Hill, a co-founder of Onira-Tech forced out of the company. He explains that her condition is "derealization", an unintended side effect of the implant, and that his former partner is covering up the truth behind their work. Paul, Charlie, and Alexis, in turn, paint Oliver as unstable and paranoid, and warn Mara that he's trying to manipulate her. Some Reverie tech is stolen and sold to Glenn Maybach (David Rogers), a coder with severe OCD, who plans to use it to prepare himself to break into a pharmaceutical company for the medicine needed to save his friend Quincy. Charlie tracks down Oliver, who demands to be reinstated at Onira-Tech; Charlie refuses and warns him to stay away from Mara. Shaw persuades the president of the company to enroll Quincy in a drug trial in return for Glenn "testing" his security measures. Alexis reveals that she kicked her former partner out of the company when he tried to set fire to her house; meanwhile, Oliver bribes a security guard to give him access to an implant.
5	"Altum Somnum"	Dawn Wilkinson	Erika Green Swafford	June 27, 2018	1.83
An unknown terrorist, "Silas", sets off a bomb at the Mercodyne building, killing 63 people; Shaw requests that Mara dive into the mind of a mortally wounded victim, Denise Lang, to try and obtain an ID before more attacks occur. Despite the risk that Mara could be trapped if Denise dies, Paul partially rebuilds her mind to resemble the day of the bombing. However, Shaw then learns that "Denise" is an imposter; her real identity is Silas' accomplice, Ashley Trent. To teach Alexis to be more responsible, Charlie takes her to question another Silas associate, Edith Leonard; she commits suicide rather than talk. Mara disguises herself as Edith to gain Ashley's trust, but her condition worsens. Realizing that her consciousness is constructing an alternate reality as a refuge inside her reconstructed mind, Mara confronts Ashley with the truth that Silas manipulated her. With seconds left to live, Ashley reveals where the second bomb is located, but Mara only barely escapes before her mind collapses. The FBI manages to defuse the bomb, and Shaw and the team celebrate.
6	"Pas de Deux"	John F. Showalter	Julia Wolfe	July 11, 2018	2.19
Dr. Chris Condera (Sam Jaeger), Mara's former fiancee, brings in a patient, a former ballerina named Holly Maxwell (Sally Pressman) who lost the use of her legs in an accident and has become addicted to Reverie. To understand the situation, Mara questions Holly's sister Vivian (Wynn Everett) and consults with Chris, who also wants to try and reconnect with her. However, Charlie is concerned that their relationship might be a distraction. Mara tries to bond with Holly through dance, and then reaches out to her ex-boyfriend Zeke, who reveals that Holly dumped him after her accident. She deduces that Holly's accident also killed Zeke's unborn baby. With Alexis ready to remove Holly from Reverie by force, Mara comes to her with news that Vivian has developed multiple sclerosis and needs her help. Holly agrees to leave after one final dance with a fictional representation of her child, and finds a new purpose teaching Vivian's students. After admitting to Chris that she still loves him, Mara makes a visit to see her brother-in-law Ray, who has been in a coma since shooting Jamie and Brynn.
7	"The Black Mandala"	Daisy von Scherler Mayer	Margaret Rose Lester	July 18, 2018	1.68
Mara meets a young man named Ehmet, who isn't aware that he's in Reverie and cannot escape. Dylan identifies him as Ehmet Alwad, a teenage Syrian refugee who is being held in a special government program for interrogating suspected terrorists. Shaw refuses to help, so Paul and Alexis create a "Mandala", an exit point that will be her only way in and out of the system; they also lie to protect her from Shaw and Drew Sullivan, the contractor serving as Ehmet's interrogator. Mara frees him, but while trying to escape, a guard shoots her. Charlie instructs the team to find evidence of Ehmet's innocence, but their efforts fail until his brother Kareem gives them a new lead. Mara pretends to surrender so that Ehmet can eliminate the guard, and they create a bridge to reach the Mandala. With Mara's encouragement, Ehmet overcomes his fear and returns to reality. However, there is still bruising from her wound. Shaw gets Sullivan's program suspended, and Charlie infers that she rigged the system so that they would encounter Ehmet. Mara invites Chris over to her house, and they kiss.
8	"Despedida"	Melanie Mayron	Erika Green Swafford & Ken Woodruff	July 25, 2018	2.08
Pilar Simonet, an elderly woman suffering from lung cancer, enters Reverie in violation of her nursing home's rules; the director threatens to have her transferred if she does not leave. As Mara attempts to extract Pilar from a memory of her time in revolutionary Chile, she struggles with her wound from before. Paul gets Alexis to contact Oliver for help. Mara tries to arrange a romantic encounter between Pilar and her rebel lover Joaquin, but her actions put the children she was protecting in danger. Oliver gives Alexis a list of safeguards to protect Mara; after she leaves, he enters Reverie, allowing his physical body to slip into a coma. The director confiscates Pilar's tablet and refuses to return it, so Mara dives back in and helps her rescue the children, thereby restoring the narrative. Charlie locates the now-adult girls and reunites them with Pilar. Mara goes home to have dinner with Chris, when she gets a phone call from another man who claims to be Chris. To her horror, the man before her turns into a hallucination of Ray.
9	"The Key"	Kenneth Fink	Tom Szentgyörgyi	August 1, 2018	2.10
Oliver is hospitalized, and a message on his chest leads the hospital to contact Mara. Charlie gets him transferred to Onira-Tech. Mara enters Reverie, where Oliver asks her to get a private meeting with Alexis inside the program, and in return, explains that removing her implant is the only way to cure her condition. After some hesitation, the team agrees. Paul does some research and concludes that Mara's derealizations are linked, potentially uncovering a lost memory. Security guard Leekly, who Oliver bribed some time before, steals a key from an unconscious Alexis, just as she revives; a lack of evidence forces Charlie to release him. Mara and Paul discuss her lost memory, but Charlie interrupts and reveals the truth: Mara was the one who convinced Ray to shoot himself. Oliver collects the key from Leekly, which controls access to the company's source code, and then murders him, taking back the money he paid to Leekly. Alexis informs Charlie that she is taking some time off to visit her parents, unaware that Oliver is following. Mara has Paul put an implant in Ray so she can confront him inside Reverie.
10	"Point of Origin"	Wendey Stanzler	Mickey Fisher	August 8, 2018	1.92
Alexis returns home to her 25th birthday party and argues with her parents about their refusal to acknowledge Dylan's death. While taking out the trash, Oliver chloroforms her and traps her inside a simulation. In his own simulation, Ray tells Mara all she did was give him permission to shoot himself, and deeply regrets not only his murder of his wife and daughter but that he cannot remember their faces. Oliver initiates his plan to destroy Reverie by burning down Onira-Tech using thermite. Mara locates Alexis and frees her mind from Reverie, and she wakes to find Charlie and Shaw looking after her in a remote cabin. Mara tries try to talk Oliver out of his intended arson, confronting him with the knowledge that he set fire to his own school with people still in it. Oliver chooses arson again, but firemen save him and safely contain the fire. Three weeks later, Mara meets with Ray in Reverie for the final time, giving him a picture of his family which he holds to his heart; he dies shortly afterwards. Alexis decides to upgrade the Dylan AI so that he sounds like an adult. On the day that Reverie goes public, Paul informs Mara that she is still in Reverie; Mara is then shown in the simulation where Alexis was imprisoned.

== Reception ==
=== Critical response ===
Reverie has received a score of 62% on Rotten Tomatoes based on 13 reviews, with an average rating of 6.9/10, and 42 on Metacritic, which uses a weighted score, based on 7 reviews.

Writing for Forbes, Merrill Barr was impressed at the "limitless potential" provided by the procedural format of a show he describes as a "high concept thriller" with "enough breadcrumbs laid out to entice the audience". IndieWire's Hanh Nguyen compares the show favorably with the darker British virtual reality series Black Mirror: "The virtual reality setting is a blank canvas that invites play, and the procedural element of Mara regularly retrieving lost souls gives the series an optimistic and hopeful bent. There's plenty of fun here, but with enough pathos to add weight." Conversely, The Verge's Adi Robertson, who also compares the show with Black Mirror, was left cold by what she perceived as the broadly optimistic tone: "Audiences have gotten familiar with this kind of cautionary yarn, where technology offers a lonely simulacrum of human contact. But Reverie's pilot turns the idea toward optimism and earnest schmaltz—with extremely dull results." Shana Oneil, posting on /Film, was impressed by the premise, story, and acting, but also found the lack of hard science as a potential problem: "The ideas are certainly there, along with the creepy science tech (the actual Reverie connection module squicked me out), but good science fiction needs truth to anchor it."

=== Ratings ===
Reverie was the lowest-rated series of the NBC 2018 summer lineup, averaging just over 2 million viewers per episode.

Viewership and ratings per episode of Reverie
No.	Title	Air date	Rating/share (18–49)	Viewers (millions)
1	"Apertus"	May 30, 2018	0.6/3	2.88
2	"Bond. Jane Bond."	June 6, 2018	0.5/2	2.22
3	"No More Mr. Nice Guy"	June 13, 2018	0.5/2	2.32
4	"Blue Is the Coldest Color"	June 20, 2018	0.4/2	1.79
5	"Altum Somnum"	June 27, 2018	0.4/2	1.83
6	"Pas de Deux"	July 11, 2018	0.4/2	2.19
7	"The Black Mandala"	July 18, 2018	0.4/2	1.68
8	"Despedida"	July 25, 2018	0.4/2	2.08
9	"The Key"	August 1, 2018	0.4/2	2.10
10	"Point of Origin"	August 8, 2018	0.4/2	1.92
