= Bruised (film) =

2020 sports drama film by Halle Berry

- Official release poster
- Directed by: Halle Berry
- Written by: Michelle Rosenfarb
- Produced by: Basil Iwanyk; Brad Feinstein; Guymon Casady; Linda Gottlieb; Halle Berry; Gillian Hormel; Erica Lee; Paris Kassidokostas-Latsis; Terry Dougas
- Starring: Halle Berry; Shamier Anderson; Adan Canto; Sheila Atim; Stephen M. Henderson; Valentina Shevchenko; Adriane Lenox
- Narrated by: Halle Berry
- Cinematography: Frank G. DeMarco
- Edited by: Jacob Craycroft; Terilyn A. Shropshire
- Music by: Terence Blanchard; ASKA
- Production companies: Entertainment 360; Thunder Road Pictures; Romulus Entertainment; 87Eleven Entertainment
- Distributed by: Netflix
- Release dates: September 12, 2020 (TIFF); November 17, 2021 (U.S.)
- Running time: 138 minutes
- Countries: United States; United Kingdom
- Language: English
- Budget: $11 million

Bruised is a 2020 sports drama film starring and directed by Halle Berry in her directorial debut, who also served as the producer. It co-stars Shamier Anderson, Adan Canto, Sheila Atim, Stephen McKinley Henderson and Adriane Lenox. The screenplay was written by Michelle Rosenfarb.

Bruised had its world premiere at the 2020 Toronto International Film Festival on September 12, 2020, and was later released in select theaters and on Netflix in November 2021. The film received mixed reviews from critics, who praised Berry's directing and acting, but criticized the screenplay, and inconsistent tone of the film. Following its release, viewership on Netflix generated a multi-picture deal for Berry.

== Plot ==
Four years after forfeiting a major fight, former UFC fighter Jackie "Pretty Bull" Justice lives with her boyfriend and manager, Desi, in inner-city Newark. Earning a living as a housecleaner, Jackie relies on alcohol to cope with the tedium of her daily life. Desi pushes Jackie to start fighting again, but she refuses, angrily blaming him for mismanaging her career.

Desi takes Jackie to an illegal underground match, hoping to sign a new fighter. Recognized, the "Werewolf" provokes her into fighting. When Jackie finally loses her temper, she pins the Werewolf down and headbutts her unconscious. Catching the eye of Immaculate, a local promoter of the all-female MMA league Invicta Fighting Championships, he recruits Jackie and sets her up with Bobbi "Buddhakan" Berroa and Pops, his best trainers, to get back into fighting shape.

Heading home, Jackie and Desi are pulled over by Jackie's estranged mother Angel who has brought Manny, Jackie's six-year-old son who she has not seen since he was an infant. Manny has been placed into her custody after his father, Jackie's former boyfriend, was killed in a shooting. The trauma caused Manny to stop speaking entirely.

Manny moves in with his mother, and Jackie, under Buddhakan's guidance, slowly gets back in shape. Immaculate convinces her to sign a contract with him excluding a manager; infuriating Desi, but they eventually patch things up. Growing closer to Buddhakan, Jackie learns she is also a mother, but has not seen her child in over two years following the breakdown of her marriage.

Jackie enrolls Manny into school while learning to be a mother, even dumping all of her alcohol down the sink. However, Jackie's relationship with Desi deteriorates, until he finally snaps, smashing Manny's keyboard and hitting Jackie in the face when she tries to stop him. Jackie leaves him for good with Manny. Angel reluctantly allows them to move in with her until the fight.

Jackie is pitted against Lucia "Lady Killer" Chavez, Invicta FC's flyweight champion, in an Atlantic City title bout. Immaculate claims the fight is to get Jackie back into the UFC, but he later angrily admits he recruited her as a can against Chavez.

Jackie suffers a panic attack, reliving the memory of her last fight. Manny tries to comfort her, but she screams at him to go away. He runs off, and a stranger brings him to Angel. Already on bad terms with her daughter (as Jackie accused her of letting her boyfriends and Jackie's uncle rape her as a child), Angel scornfully tells Jackie she is an unfit mother and that she will take over caring for Manny.

With no one else to turn to, Jackie starts living with Buddhakan, throwing herself into her training. Confessing her fears of returning to the ring, they kiss and become intimate. However, when Buddhaken asks her to consider becoming official, Jackie admits she is not ready and Buddhakan goes on a bender, ending up hospitalized the day before the fight.

With only Pops in her corner, Jackie enters the fight against Chavez distracted, so the champion dominates the first round. In the second and third rounds, her confidence builds as she wears down Chavez and wins over the audience. In the fifth and final round, Jackie matches Chavez blow-for-blow, ending in a split decision, where Chavez narrowly retains her championship. Despite this, she and the audience celebrate Jackie's successful comeback.

After reconciling with Buddhakan, Jackie goes back to Angel's, promising them she is going to get their own place. The women part on good terms. As they walk down the street, Jackie stops to help Manny tie his shoes and he speaks to her for the first time, accepting her as his mother.

== Cast ==
- Halle Berry as Jackie "Pretty Bull" Justice
- Danny Boyd Jr. as Manny Justice, Jackie's son
- Shamier Anderson as Immaculate, an MMA league owner who arranges the match between Jackie and Lady Killer.
- Adan Canto as Desi, Jackie's manager
- Sheila Atim as Bobbi 'Buddhakan' Berroa
- Stephen McKinley Henderson as Pops, a seasoned trainer who works with Jackie.
- Adriane Lenox as Angel McQueen-Justice, Jackie's mother
- Valentina Shevchenko as Lucia "Lady Killer" Chavez, a top Argentinian fighter and Jackie's opponent
- Lela Loren as Mrs. Bradshaw
- Gabi Garcia as Werewolf

Additionally, MMA referee Keith Peterson cameos as himself for the referee of the final fight between Jackie and Lady Killer and UFC fighter Yves Edwards plays a commentator.

=== Controversy ===
Reportedly, on August 16, 2021, the MMA star and former UFC fighter Cat Zingano filed a lawsuit against Berry, Bruised Film Productions LLC, Thunder Road Film Productions Inc. and Romulus Entertainment LLC in Los Angeles Superior Court, seeking damages based upon claims of promissory estoppel. Zingano states that Berry had offered her a role in the film during a meeting in July 2019. According to Zingano, after she was offered a UFC fight slated for October, which would put her in title contention, she was advised by Berry not to take it for insurance reasons. She turned down the fight and was subsequently released by UFC in August 2019. Zingano further alleged that Berry informed her shortly afterwards that she could not appear in the film, as only current UFC fighters were allowed to take part. The suit also states that Berry ceased all communication with Zingano following the incident.

Court papers filed in November 2021, by Berry's attorneys, stated that Zingano lost her UFC contract due to her poor record in the organization. The documents also alleged that she made the decision to appear in the film without knowing what role she would play or how much would she be paid and did so based upon text message exchanges with Berry. According to Berry's attorneys, Zingano did not state what her damages are and that she was improperly seeking punitive damages.

== Production ==
Initially, Nick Cassavetes was slated to direct the mixed martial arts film Bruised written by Michelle Rosenfarb and produced by Guymon Casady, Basil Iwanyk, Linda Gottlieb, and Erica Lee. Blake Lively was originally cast as the main character in the film. On September 11, 2018, Halle Berry took over directing Bruised, making it her directorial debut, and replaced Lively as the main character in the film. On December 4, 2019, Shamier Anderson and Adan Canto were cast in the film. On December 16, 2019, Sheila Atim was cast in the film.

Principal photography began in November 2019, in New Jersey. Filming locations included the Jim Whelan Boardwalk Hall in Atlantic City and a boxing gym in Newark. During filming, Berry suffered a minor injury, with filming being suspended for a few days. Production resumed on November 27. Production concluded on December 20, 2019.

The film's score was composed by Terence Blanchard and ASKA (Aska Matsumiya).

== Release ==
In September 2020, Netflix acquired distribution rights to the film for around $20 million. The film's world premiere was held at the Toronto International Film Festival on September 12, 2020. The film also screened at AFI Fest on November 14, 2021. It had a limited theatrical release on November 17, 2021, prior to streaming on Netflix on November 24.

== Reception ==
On the review aggregator website Rotten Tomatoes, 50% of 94 critics' reviews are positive, with an average rating of 5.7/10. The website's consensus reads: "Bruised isn't as hard-hitting as its title might suggest, but Halle Berry impresses on either side of the camera in her directorial debut." Metacritic, which uses a weighted average, assigned the film a score of 52 out of 100, based on 23 critics, indicating "mixed or average" reviews.

Peter Hammond of Deadline Hollywood wrote that "there is no question Berry has thrown it all against the wall with this one and acquitted herself admirably, not just as you might expect acting-wise from the Oscar-winning star of Monster's Ball but also behind the camera. She keenly navigates a female-driven story of a disgraced MMA fighting superstar trying to claw her way back to the top while putting the pieces of her shattered personal life back together."

Filmmaker Gina Prince-Bythewood praised Berry's direction, saying "Halle took her first shot in the chair and came out a winner, and though I know it was anything but effortless, that is the quality she achieved on screen. That's a tall order for even the most seasoned director."

=== Accolades ===
Award	Date of ceremony	Category	Recipient(s)	Result	Ref.
AARP Movies for Grownups Awards	March 18, 2022	Best Actress	Halle Berry	Nominated	
Black Reel Awards	February 27, 2022	Outstanding Director	Halle Berry	Nominated	
Black Reel Awards	February 27, 2022	Outstanding Emerging Director	Halle Berry	Nominated	
Black Reel Awards	February 27, 2022	Outstanding Actress	Halle Berry	Nominated	
Black Reel Awards	February 27, 2022	Outstanding Editing	Jacob Craycroft, Terilyn A. Shropshire	Nominated	
Black Reel Awards	February 27, 2022	Outstanding Original Song	"Automatic Woman" (H.E.R., Van Hunt and Brittany Talia Hazzard)	Won	
NAACP Image Awards	February 26, 2022	Outstanding Independent Motion Picture	Bruised	Nominated	
NAACP Image Awards	February 26, 2022	Outstanding Actress in a Motion Picture	Halle Berry	Nominated	
NAACP Image Awards	February 26, 2022	Outstanding Breakthrough Performance in a Motion Picture	Danny Boyd Jr.	Won	
NAACP Image Awards	February 26, 2022	Outstanding Breakthrough Performance in a Motion Picture	Sheila Atim	Nominated	
Satellite Awards	April 2, 2022	Best First Feature	Halle Berry	Won	
Toronto International Film Festival	September 21, 2020	Rising Stars Award	Sheila Atim	Won	
Women Film Critics Circle	December 11, 2021	Courage in Acting Award	Halle Berry	Won	
Women Film Critics Circle	December 11, 2021	Josephine Baker Award	Bruised	Nominated	
