= Molly Woods =

- Extant character
- Halle Berry as Molly Woods
- First appearance: "Re-Entry"
- Last appearance: "The Greater Good"
- Portrayed by: Halle Berry

In-universe information
- Occupation: ISEA astronaut and scientist
- Family: Dr. John Woods (ex-husband); Quinn (father)
- Children: Ethan Woods (A prototype Humanich) 'The Offspring' (An Alien Hybrid)

Molly Woods is a fictional character from the science fiction drama series Extant, played by Halle Berry. She made her first screen appearance in the show's pilot episode "Re-Entry", which first aired on July 9, 2014 on the CBS network in the United States.

Molly is an astronaut. She is married to John Woods and is the mother of Ethan Woods, a "humanich" android. While aboard a spaceflight to ISEA (the fictional space agency that replaced NASA) space station, she inexplicably becomes pregnant during the 13-month solo voyage. She returns to Earth amid chaotic happenings with her family life while in the space program and unexplained events of the early pregnancy. She goes through medical and psychological tests after returning to ISEA.

== Present time ==
The believed dead Harmon Kryger makes an attempt to contact Molly after she has an eventful day with her husband John and son Ethan. From hurried and missed breakfast with John, to the trip to the museum with Ethan which features Ethan with more questions than answers from Molly. Also, the revelation from Sam Barton that her brain scans are just like Krygers, (but he died) and she is 14 weeks pregnant. The night is just as mysterious as the Woods prepare for the next day's events.

Later we see Ethan prepared for interaction with children at school, as Molly defends his place in a school setting to the worried parents. Molly reveals to John, she just signed up for another rotation on the Seraphim, while John was ready to add Ethan to the family. Molly objects saying, "you just can't plug and play a family." Molly's boss interrupts her morning jog to let her in on the Covert program that allowed her to become pregnant by timed release Nano-technology. He mentions her brain scans that matched Kryger's and that's what led to his suicide.

Unbeknownst to Molly Director Sparks is planning to covertly bring her in for further study with a medical team. Her doctor Dr. Barton, arrives that night to draw a blood sample to determine the DNA of Molly's unborn fetus. Later, Molly reveals to John she is pregnant and that she is afraid he wouldn't believe her.

== Flashbacks to the past ==
In the opening, we see Molly in a darkened room reminiscing about earlier times with Marcus. She goes to the bookcase and removes an old photo album, and we see a picture of her with Marcus in his ISEA mission uniform with Molly and it's a moving scene. They begin to look at each other and tighten their embrace. She is interrupted when John appears after putting Ethan in rest mode for the night. Next we see her aboard the Seraphim initiating bio-sample tests on plants and worms, when Ben, her onboard computer (a disembodied voice) tells her of an incoming v-com, or video communication from John and Ethan. The v-com is interrupted by what Ben says is a solar flare. Ben then goes offline while Molly frantically tries to reboot.

That's when we first see Marcus appear to Molly's shock and surprise. She and Marcus interact briefly after she tries to burn her hand to attempt to see if the person she sees is real. Next we see Molly explaining away 13 lost hours of video from the space station. Gordon Kern, (the deputy director of ISEA) mentions the backup cameras on board the Seraphim, and questions Molly about the lost footage which she explains away (not convincingly to Director Sparks) as a glitch.

We see Molly wake up in the lab and in a frantic scene we see her playback the security video footage to see if Marcus is there, and he's not, but she realizes she has to hide the footage from ISEA since Marcus died years earlier.

The next night John has the birthday party for Molly and they invite friends and close ISEA associates. Dr. Barton arrives to take the blood sample from Molly, after she leaves Molly has sharp pains in her stomach and then flashes back to the event on the Seraphim with Marcus saying "it's ok." Then Molly returns to the party and the doorbell rings and it's Tim Dawkins, Marcus' brother. Molly hasn't seen Tim for a while. He tells her he's on furlough and decided to drop by. We learn she actually hasn't seen Tim in eight years since she lost the baby and Marcus. He curiously asks Molly if she has seen Marcus and tries to reassure Molly that it will be all right. Next we see Molly call Tim over when John wants a group party picture. She mingles in the party for a while. Then after revealing her secret to John they return and Molly asks John if he has seen Tim.

Molly suddenly realizes she is the only one who has seen Tim and something is happening to her.
