= Frankie & Alice =

2010 film by Geoffrey Sax

- Theatrical release poster
- Directed by: Geoffrey Sax
- Screenplay by: Cheryl Edwards; Marko King; Mary King; Jonathan Watters; Joe Shrapnel; Anna Waterhouse
- Story by: Oscar Janiger; Philip Goldberg; Cheryl Edwards
- Produced by: Halle Berry; Vincent Cirrincione; Simon DeKaric; Hassain Zaidi
- Starring: Halle Berry; Stellan Skarsgård
- Cinematography: Newton Thomas Sigel
- Edited by: David Richardson
- Music by: Andrew Lockington
- Production company: Access Motion Pictures
- Distributed by: CodeBlack Films; Lions Gate Entertainment (United States)
- Release dates: May 17, 2010 (Cannes); December 10, 2010 (United States)
- Running time: 101 minutes
- Country: Canada
- Language: English
- Box office: $706,546

Frankie & Alice is a 2010 Canadian drama film directed by Geoffrey Sax, starring Halle Berry. Filming began in Vancouver, British Columbia, in November 2008, and ended in January 2009. To qualify for awards season, the film opened in a limited release on December 10, 2010. It is based on a true story about a popular go-go dancer and stripper in the 1970s who has dissociative identity disorder.

While the film received mixed reviews from critics, Berry's performance was widely praised and she received several accolades, including a nomination for the Golden Globe Award for Best Actress in a Motion Picture – Drama.

== Plot ==
Frankie is performing at a Los Angeles club in 1973. She is one of the best strippers at the club, and often attracts the attention of wealthy businessmen. One night, the club's female employees go out for a "Girls Night". As the girls observe all the men at the bar, Frankie gets the attention of a well-known bartender. She agrees to go to his home for sex. Before the two can engage in any sexual activity, Frankie switches to an alter ego, and cracks the man's head open with a picture frame. Word of Frankie's violent activity spreads to the strip club quickly, and Frankie is fired from the needed job. Similar episodes occur while Frankie is at the laundromat and at a wedding.

Frankie starts psychotherapy with Doctor Oz. During a session, Frankie learns that she has two alters: Genius, a seven-year-old child; and Alice, a Southern white racist, whom Frankie struggles to overcome. Through regular sessions with Dr. Oz, Frankie begins to recall the traumatic events that led to the dissociative splits in her personality. She realizes that when she was a teenager she was in love with a white man who died in a car accident while they were on the road. In the same session, she also connects with the memory of the birth of her child. Moments after the birth, Frankie's mother realizes that the child is half-white and kills it, thus triggering Frankie's personality to split.

After she watches the taped sessions, and puts everything together, Frankie begins the healing process, taking control of her life and semi-integrating the personalities that Dr. Oz assures her will always be present.

== Cast ==
- Halle Berry as Frankie Murdoch / Genius / Alice
  - Vanessa Morgan as 16-year-old Frankie Murdoch
  - Michayla McKenzie as 8-year-old Frankie Murdoch
- Stellan Skarsgård as Dr. Joseph "Oz" Oswald
- Phylicia Rashad as Edna Murdoch, Frankie's mother
- Chandra Wilson as Maxine Murdoch, Frankie's sister
- Rosalyn Coleman as Pearl
- Joanne Baron as Nurse Susan Shaw
- Brian Markinson as Dr. Warren Backman
- Matt Frewer as Dr. Strassfield
- Katharine Isabelle as Paige Prescott, Pete's wife
  - Emily Tennant as 16-year-old Paige Prescott
  - Megan Charpentier as 8-year-old Paige Prescott
- Melanie Papalia as Tina
- Joey Bothwell as Trish
- Scott Lyster as Pete Prescott, Paige's husband
- Kira Clavell as Wanda
- Anne Marie DeLuise as White Alice
- Xantha Radley as Maria
- James Kirk as Bobby
- Colin Foo as Thin Asian Patient
- Andrew Francis as Cop #2
- Adrian Holmes as Clifton

== Production ==
The film spent a decade in development, with Berry involved in the project since the mid-1990s. Filming took place in 2008.

== Release ==
Frankie & Alice had its world premiere in May 2010 at the Cannes Film Festival. It went on to screen at the AFI Film Festival that November, and was given a limited release in the United States on December 10, 2010, to qualify for awards. The film's producers, Access Motion Pictures, had planned for a wider release the following February, but these plans did not materialize even as Berry was nominated for a Golden Globe Award and won an NAACP Image Award for her performance.

In September 2013, Codeblack Films acquired distribution rights to the film. The film was given a wider re-release on April 4, 2014.

== Reception ==
=== Critical response ===
On Rotten Tomatoes, the film has an approval rating of 21% based on reviews from 33 critics. The website's critics consensus states: "Halle Berry gives it her all (and then some), but Frankie & Alice is ultimately too narratively strained and clumsily assembled to do her performance justice." On Metacritic it has a score of 47% based on reviews from 14 critics, indicating "mixed or average reviews".

Writing of the Cannes Film Festival screening, The Hollywood Reporter described the film as "a well-wrought psychological drama that delves into the dark side of one woman's psyche". The review also said Halle Berry was "spellbinding" as Frankie, with "rock-solid" supporting performances.

=== Accolades ===
- African-American Film Critics Association
  - Nominee, Best Picture
  - Winner, Best Actress: Halle Berry
- Golden Globes
  - Nominee, Best Actress in a Motion Picture Drama: Halle Berry
- NAACP Image Awards
  - Winner, Outstanding Actress in a Motion Picture: Halle Berry
  - Winner, Outstanding Independent Motion Picture
- Prism Award
  - Winner, Performance in a Feature Film: Halle Berry
