= Halle Berry =

American actress (born 1966)

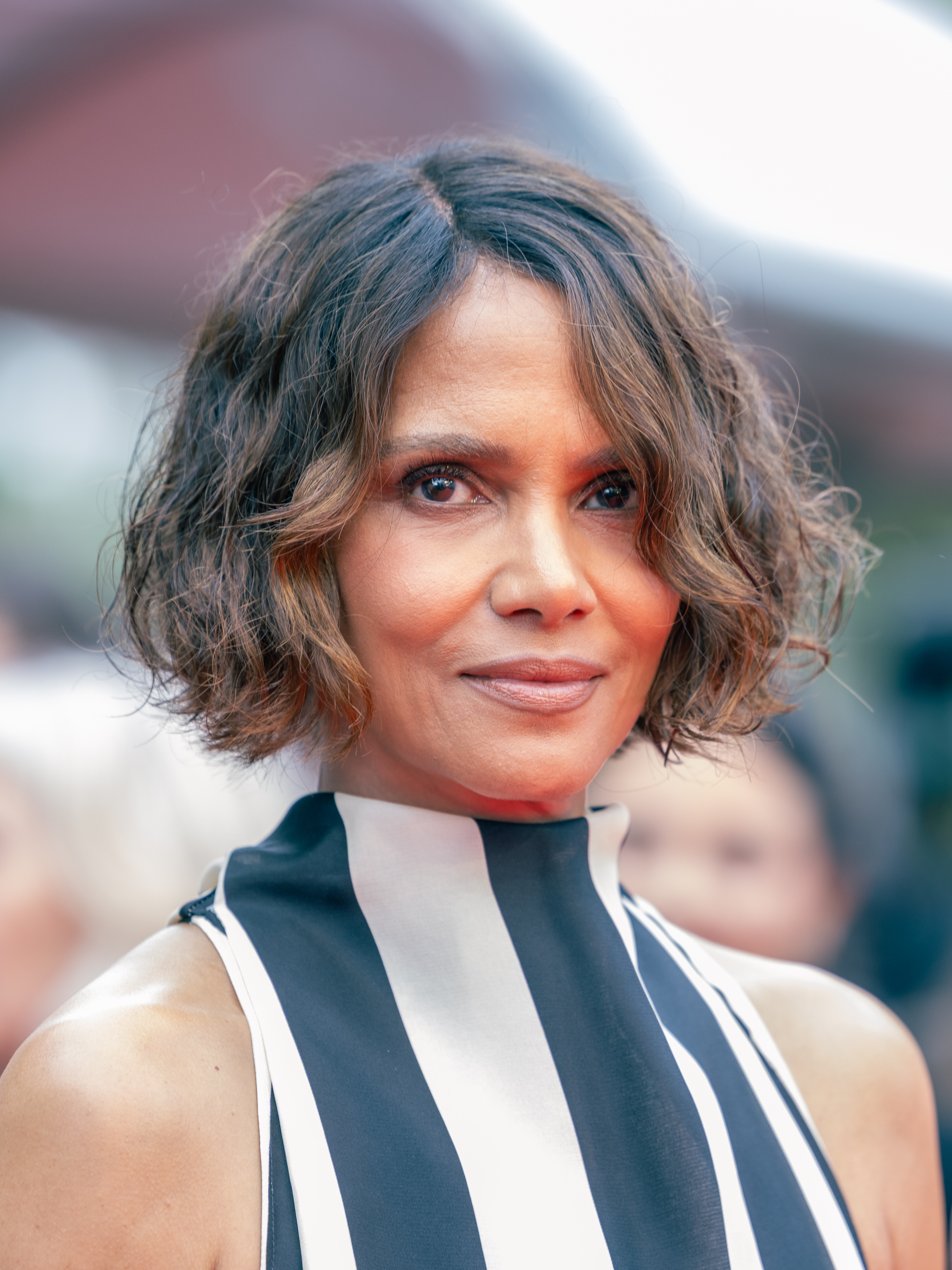
- Berry in 2025
- Born: Maria Halle Berry; August 14, 1966 (age 60); Cleveland, Ohio, U.S.
- Occupation: Actress
- Years active: 1989–present
- Spouses: David Justice (m. 1993; div. 1997); Eric Benét (m. 2001; div. 2005); Olivier Martinez (m. 2013; div. 2016)
- Partner(s): John Ronan (1989–1991); Gabriel Aubry (2005–2010); Van Hunt (2020–present; engaged)
- Children: 2
- Awards: Full list

Halle Maria Berry (Note: Pronunciation of "Halle": /ˈhæli/, HAL-ee) (born Maria Halle Berry; August 14, 1966) is an American actress. She began her career as a model and beauty contestant, becoming Miss Ohio USA in 1986, finishing as first runner-up at Miss USA 1986, and placing sixth at Miss World 1986. Her early film roles include Boomerang (1992), The Flintstones (1994) and Bulworth (1998). She produced and starred in the television film Introducing Dorothy Dandridge (1999), for which she won a Primetime Emmy Award and a Golden Globe Award.

Berry won the Academy Award for Best Actress for her portrayal of a struggling widow in the romantic drama Monster's Ball (2001). She played Storm in the X-Men film series (2000–2014), a villain in Swordfish (2001), the Bond girl Jinx in Die Another Day (2002), a psychiatrist in Gothika (2003), and Catwoman in Catwoman (2004). She also appeared in Perfect Stranger (2007), Cloud Atlas (2012) and The Call (2013), Kingsman: The Golden Circle (2017) and John Wick: Chapter 3 – Parabellum (2019).

Berry produced the television film Lackawanna Blues (2005), and subsequently produced several projects in which she also performed, including the film Frankie & Alice (2010) and the CBS science fiction series Extant (2014–2015). In 2014, Berry launched the production company 606 Films. In 2020, she made her directorial debut with the Netflix drama Bruised. She has been a Revlon spokesmodel since 1996. She was formerly married to baseball player David Justice, singer-songwriter Eric Benét, and actor Olivier Martinez. Berry shares one child with Martinez and another with her former partner Gabriel Aubry.

== Early life ==
Maria Halle Berry was born on August 14, 1966 in Cleveland, Ohio. Her mother is Judith Ann (née Hawkins), a first generation American whose own mother was from Liverpool. Her father is Jerome Jesse Berry, an African-American man who died in 2003. Berry's mother worked as a psychiatric nurse, while her father worked in the same hospital as an attendant in the psychiatric ward. He later became a bus driver. Berry's parents divorced when she was four years old, and she and her older sister were raised exclusively by their mother. Berry's middle name came from Halle's Department Store, a Cleveland landmark at the time. Berry's name was legally changed to Halle Maria Berry when she was five.

Berry witnessed her alcoholic father frequently beating her mother, and Berry became estranged from him during childhood. (Note: Attributed to multiple references:) Berry was bullied as a child, and learned how to fight and protect herself. She grew up in Oakwood, Ohio, and graduated from Bedford High School, where she was a cheerleader, honor student, editor of the school newspaper, and prom queen. She worked in the children's department of Higbee's department store and attended Cuyahoga Community College. In 1985, she won the Miss Teen All American beauty pageant. In 1986, she won Miss Ohio USA, was the first runner-up at Miss USA, and became the first African-American to represent the United States at the Miss World pageant, where she placed sixth. (Note: Attributed to multiple references:)

== Career ==
=== Early work and breakthrough (1989–1999) ===
In 1989, Berry moved to New York City to realize her acting ambitions. At one point early on, she ran out of money and briefly lived in a homeless shelter and a YMCA. Her film debut was in Spike Lee's Jungle Fever (1991), in which she played Vivian, a drug addict. The same year, Berry had her first co-starring role in Strictly Business. In 1992, Berry portrayed a career woman who falls for Eddie Murphy's character in the romantic comedy Boomerang. The following year, she played a headstrong biracial slave in the TV adaptation of Queen: The Story of an American Family, based on the book by Alex Haley. Berry also appeared in the live-action Flintstones film as Sharon Stone, a sultry secretary who attempts to seduce Fred Flintstone.

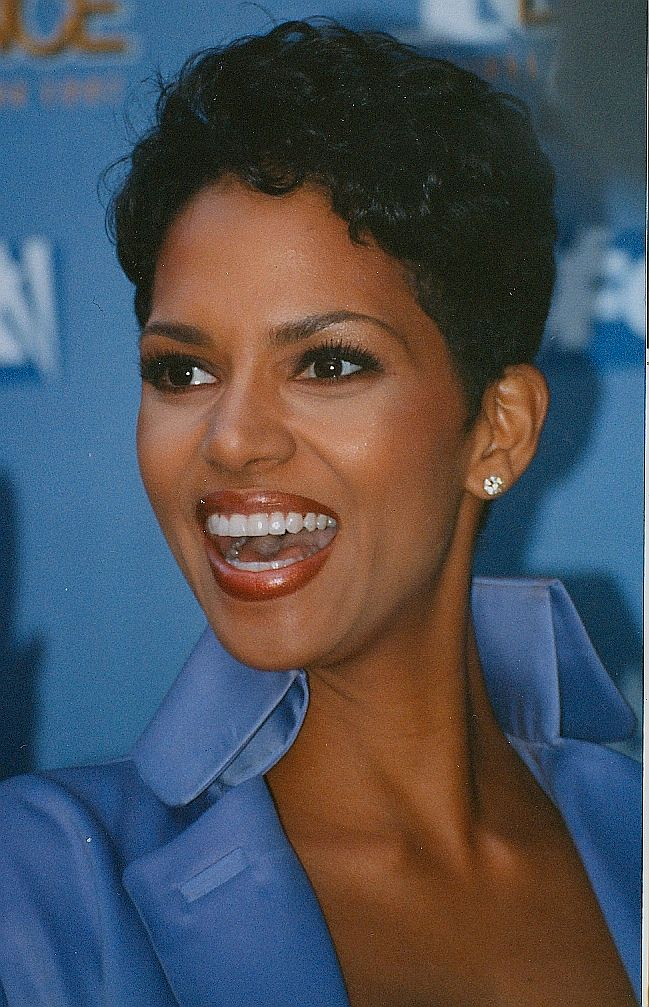
Berry at the 1997 Essence Awards

Berry tackled a more serious role, playing a former drug addict struggling to regain custody of her son in Losing Isaiah (1995), starring opposite Jessica Lange. She portrayed Sandra Beecher in Race the Sun (1996), which was based on a true story, shot in Australia, and co-starred alongside Kurt Russell in Executive Decision. Beginning in 1996, she was a Revlon spokeswoman for seven years and renewed her contract in 2004. She starred alongside Natalie Deselle Reid in the 1997 comedy film B*A*P*S. In 1998, Berry received praise for her role in Bulworth as an intelligent woman raised by activists who gives a politician (Warren Beatty) a new lease on life. The same year, she played the singer Zola Taylor, one of the three wives of pop singer Frankie Lymon, in the biopic Why Do Fools Fall in Love. In the 1999 HBO biopic Introducing Dorothy Dandridge, she portrayed Dorothy Dandridge, the first African American woman to be nominated for the Academy Award for Best Actress. It was to Berry a heartfelt project that she introduced, co-produced and fought intensely for it to come through. Berry won awards including a Primetime Emmy Award and Golden Globe Award.

=== Worldwide recognition (2000–2004) ===
Berry portrayed the mutant superhero Storm in the film adaptation of the comic book series X-Men (2000) and its sequels, X2 (2003), X-Men: The Last Stand (2006) and X-Men: Days of Future Past (2014). In 2001, Berry appeared in the film Swordfish, which featured her first topless scene. At first, she was opposed to a sunbathing scene in the film in which she would appear topless, but Berry eventually agreed. Some people attributed her change of heart to a substantial increase in the amount Warner Bros. offered her; she was reportedly paid an additional $500,000 for the short scene. Berry denied these stories, telling one interviewer that they amused her and "made for great publicity for the movie." After turning down numerous roles that required nudity, she said she decided to make Swordfish because her then-husband, Eric Benét, supported her and encouraged her to take risks.

Berry appeared as Leticia Musgrove, the troubled wife of an executed murderer (Sean Combs), in the 2001 feature film Monster's Ball. Her performance was awarded the National Board of Review and the Actor Award for Best Actress. She became the first African-American woman to win the Academy Award for Best Actress. The NAACP issued the statement: "Congratulations to Halle Berry and Denzel Washington for giving us hope and making us proud. If this is a sign that Hollywood is finally ready to give opportunity and judge performance based on skill and not on skin color then it is a good thing." This role generated controversy. Her graphic nude love scene with a racist character played by co-star Billy Bob Thornton was the subject of much media chatter and discussion among African Americans. Many in the African-American community were critical of Berry for taking the part. Berry responded: "I don't really see a reason to ever go that far again. That was a unique movie. That scene was special and pivotal and needed to be there, and it would be a really special script that would require something like that again."

Berry asked for a higher fee for Revlon advertisements after winning the Oscar. Ron Perelman, the cosmetics firm's chief, congratulated her, saying how happy he was that she modeled for his company. She replied, "Of course, you'll have to pay me more." Perelman stalked off in a rage. In accepting her award, she gave an acceptance speech honoring previous black actresses who had never had the opportunity. She said, "This moment is so much bigger than me. This is for every nameless, faceless woman of color who now has a chance tonight because this door has been opened."

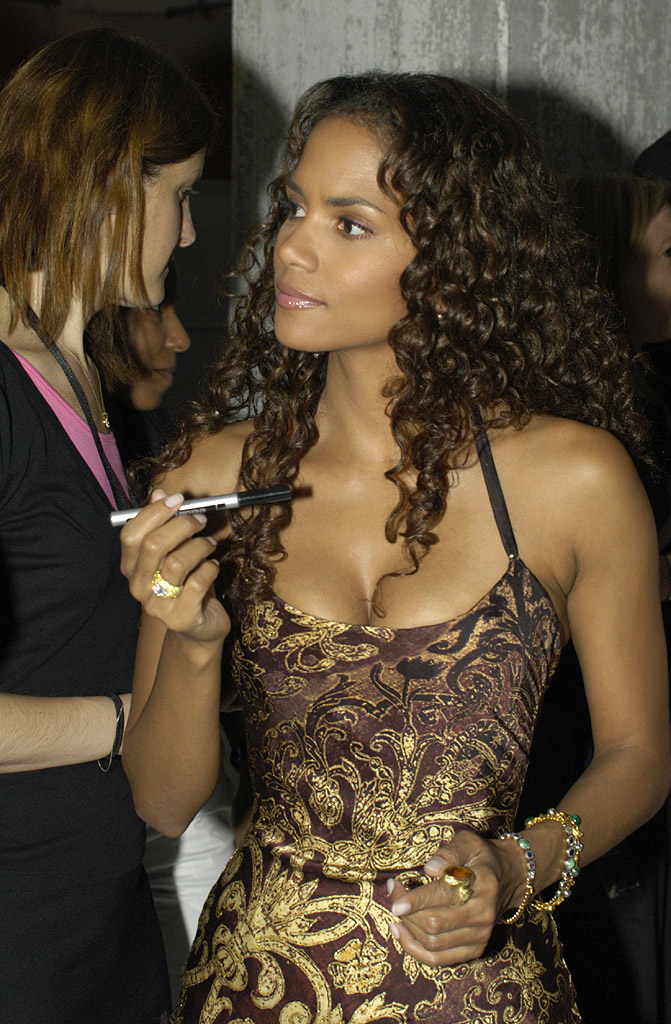
Berry at the German premiere of Catwoman in 2004

As Bond girl Giacinta 'Jinx' Johnson in the 2002 Die Another Day, Berry filmed an homage to Dr. No, emerging from the surf to be greeted by James Bond as Ursula Andress had forty years earlier. Lindy Hemming, costume designer on Die Another Day, had insisted that Berry wear a bikini and knife as a homage. Berry has said of the scene: "It's splashy," "exciting," "sexy," "provocative" and "it will keep me still out there after winning an Oscar." According to an ITV news poll, Jinx was voted the fourth toughest girl on screen of all time. Berry was hurt during filming when debris from a smoke grenade flew into her eye. It was removed in a 30-minute operation. After Berry won the Academy Award, rewrites were commissioned to give her more screentime for X2.

She starred in the psychological thriller Gothika opposite Robert Downey, Jr. in November 2003. She had broken her arm while filming a scene with Downey, who twisted her arm too hard. Production was halted for eight weeks while she healed. It was a moderate hit at the United States box office, taking in $60 million; it earned another $80 million abroad. Berry appeared in the nu metal band Limp Bizkit's music video for "Behind Blue Eyes" for the motion picture soundtrack for the film. The same year, she was named No. 1 in FHM's 100 Sexiest Women in the World poll.

Berry starred as the title role in the film Catwoman, for which she received US$12.5 million. It is widely regarded by critics as one of the worst films ever made. She was awarded the Worst Actress Razzie Award for her performance; she appeared at the ceremony to accept the award in person (while holding her Oscar from Monster's Ball) with a sense of humor, considering it an experience of the "rock bottom" in order to be "at the top." Holding the Academy Award in one hand and the Razzie in the other she said, "I never in my life thought that I would be up here, winning a Razzie! It's not like I ever aspired to be here, but thank you. When I was a kid, my mother told me that if you could not be a good loser, then there's no way you could be a good winner."

=== Established actress and career fluctuations (2005–2013) ===
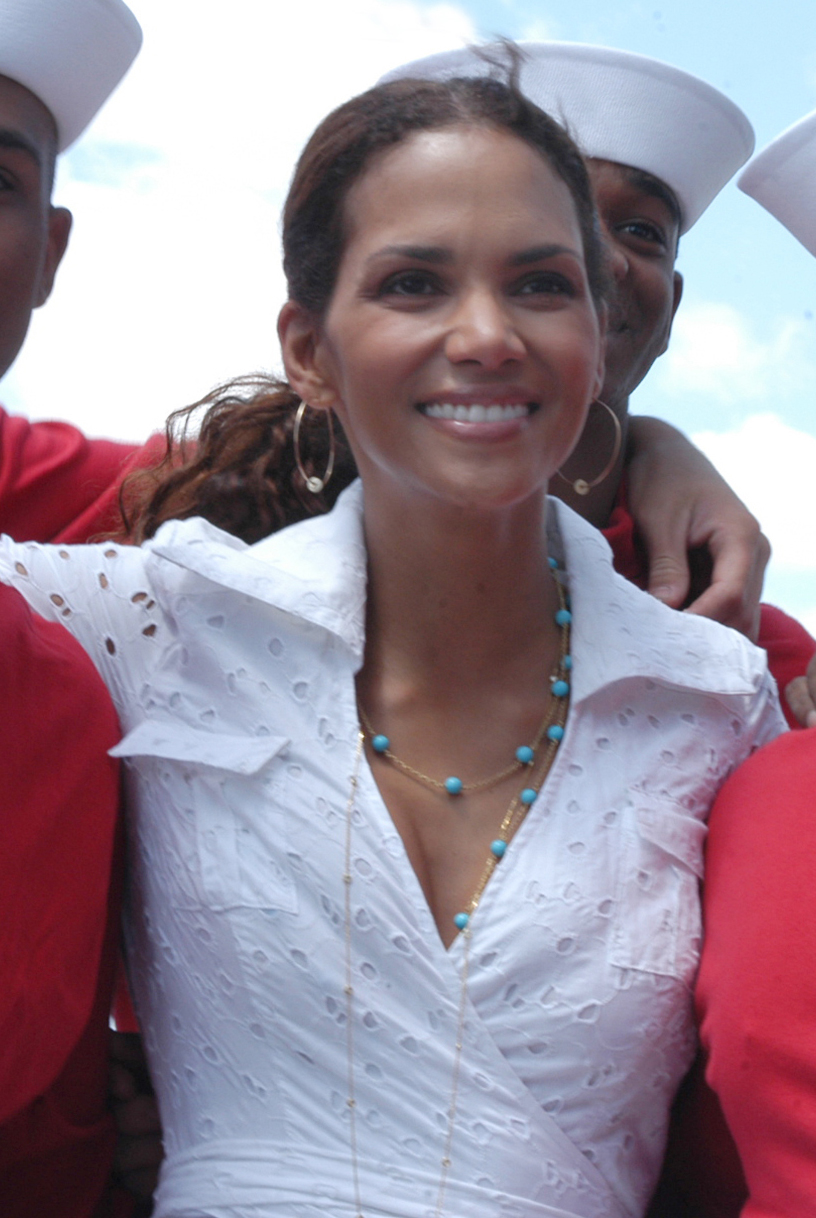
Berry at New York Fleet Week in 2006

Her next role was in the Oprah Winfrey-produced ABC television film Their Eyes Were Watching God (2005), an adaptation of Zora Neale Hurston's novel of the same name. Berry portrayed a free-spirited woman whose unconventional sexual mores upset her 1920s contemporaries in a small community. She received her second Primetime Emmy Award nomination for her role. Also in 2005, she served as an executive producer in Lackawanna Blues. She was the voice for the character of Cappy, one of the many mechanical beings in the animated feature Robots.

In the thriller Perfect Stranger (2007), Berry starred with Bruce Willis, playing a reporter who goes undercover to uncover the killer of her childhood friend. The film grossed a modest US$73 million worldwide, and received lukewarm reviews from critics, who felt that despite the presence of Berry and Willis, it is "too convoluted to work, and features a twist ending that's irritating and superfluous." Her next 2007 film release was the drama Things We Lost in the Fire, co-starring Benicio del Toro. She played a recently widowed woman who befriended the troubled friend of her late husband. The film was the first time in which she worked with a female director, Danish Susanne Bier, giving her a new feeling of "thinking the same way," which she appreciated. While the film made US$8.6 million in its global theatrical run, it garnered positive reviews. The Austin Chronicle found the film to be "an impeccably constructed and perfectly paced drama of domestic and internal volatility" and felt that "Berry is brilliant here, as good as she's ever been."

In April 2007, Berry was awarded a star on the Hollywood Walk of Fame in front of the Kodak Theatre at 6801 Hollywood Boulevard for her contributions to the film industry. By the end of the decade, she established herself as one of the highest-paid actresses in Hollywood, earning an estimated $10 million per film.

In the independent drama Frankie and Alice (2010), Berry played the leading role of a young multiracial American woman with dissociative identity disorder; she struggled against her alter personality to retain her true self. The film received a limited theatrical release, to a mixed critical response. The Hollywood Reporter described the film as "a well-wrought psychological drama that delves into the dark side of one woman's psyche" and found Berry to be "spellbinding" in it. She earned the African-American Film Critics Association Award for Best Actress and a Golden Globe Award nomination for Best Actress – Motion Picture Drama. She next made part of a large ensemble cast in Garry Marshall's romantic comedy New Year's Eve (2011), with Michelle Pfeiffer, Jessica Biel, Robert De Niro, Josh Duhamel, Zac Efron, Sarah Jessica Parker, and Sofía Vergara, among many others. In the film, she took on the supporting role of a nurse befriending a man in the final stages of cancer (De Niro). While the film was panned by critics, it made US$142 million worldwide.

In 2012, Berry starred as an expert diver tutor alongside then-husband Olivier Martinez in the little-seen thriller Dark Tide. She led an ensemble cast opposite Tom Hanks and Jim Broadbent in The Wachowskis' epic science fiction film Cloud Atlas (2012), with each of the actors playing six different characters across a period of five centuries. Budgeted at US$128.8 million, Cloud Atlas made US$130.4 million worldwide. It garnered polarized reactions from both critics and audiences.

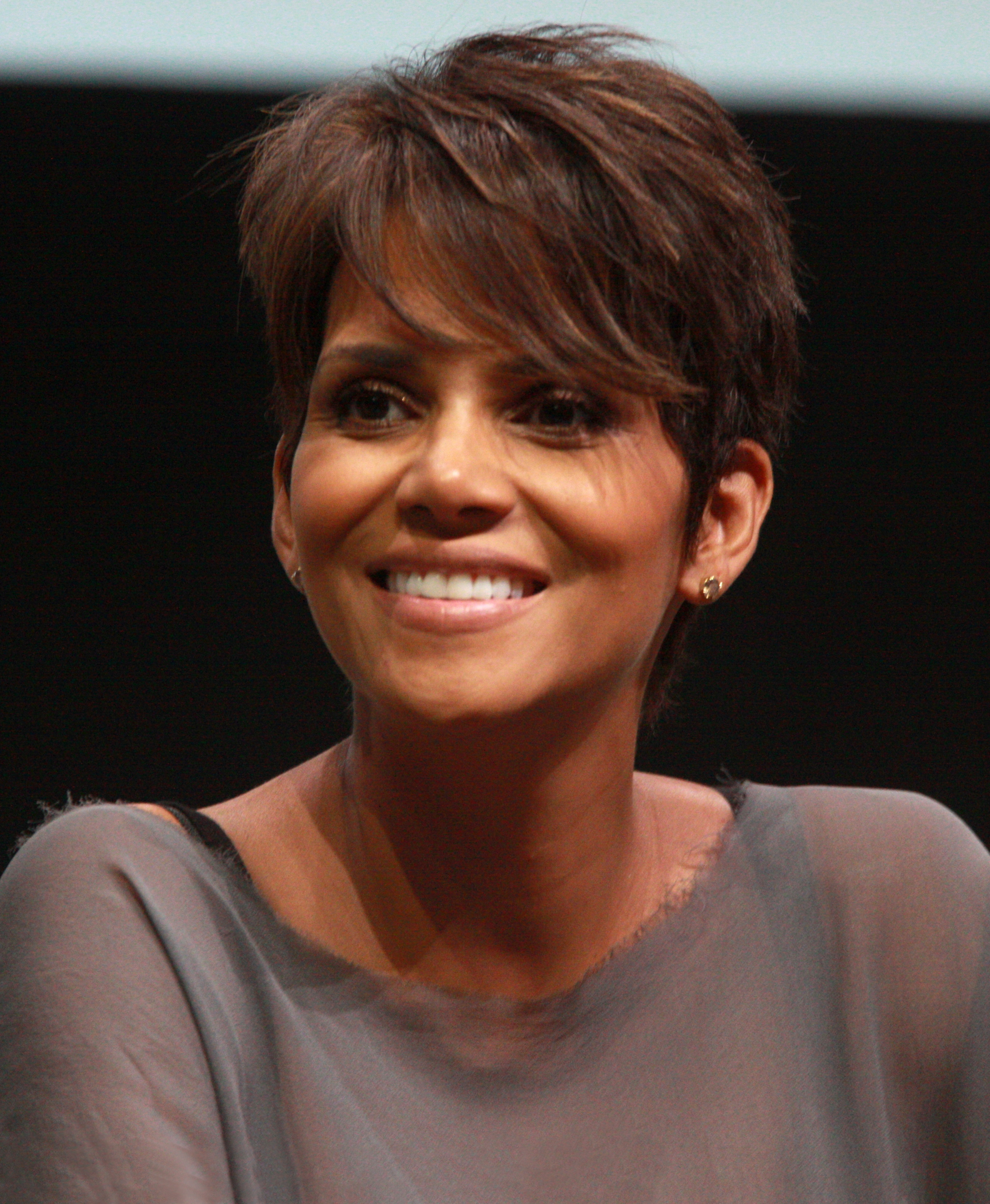
Berry at the 2013 San Diego Comic-Con

Berry appeared in a segment of the independent anthology comedy Movie 43 (2013), which the Chicago Sun-Times called "the Citizen Kane of awful." Berry found greater success with her next performance, as a 9-1-1 operator receiving a call from a girl kidnapped by a serial killer, in the crime thriller The Call (2013). Berry was drawn to "the idea of being a part of a movie that was so empowering for women. We don't often get to play roles like this, where ordinary people become heroic and do something extraordinary." Manohla Dargis of The New York Times found the film to be "an effectively creepy thriller," while reviewer Dwight Brown felt that "the script gives Berry a blue-collar character she can make accessible, vulnerable and gutsy[...]." The Call was a sleeper hit, grossing US$68.6 million around the globe.

=== Continued film and television work (2014–present) ===
In 2014, Berry signed on to star and serve as a co-executive producer in CBS drama series Extant, where she took on the role of Molly Woods, an astronaut who struggles to reconnect with her husband and android son after spending 13 months in space. The show ran for two seasons until 2015, receiving largely positive reviews from critics. USA Today remarked: "She [Halle Berry] brings a dignity and gravity to Molly, a projected intelligence that allows you to buy her as an astronaut and to see what has happened to her as frightening rather than ridiculous. Berry's all in, and you float along." Also in 2014, Berry launched a new production company, 606 Films, with producing partner Elaine Goldsmith-Thomas. It is named after the Anti-Paparazzi Bill, SB 606, that the actress pushed for and which was signed into law by California Governor Jerry Brown in the fall of 2013. The new company emerged as part of a deal for Berry to work in Extant.

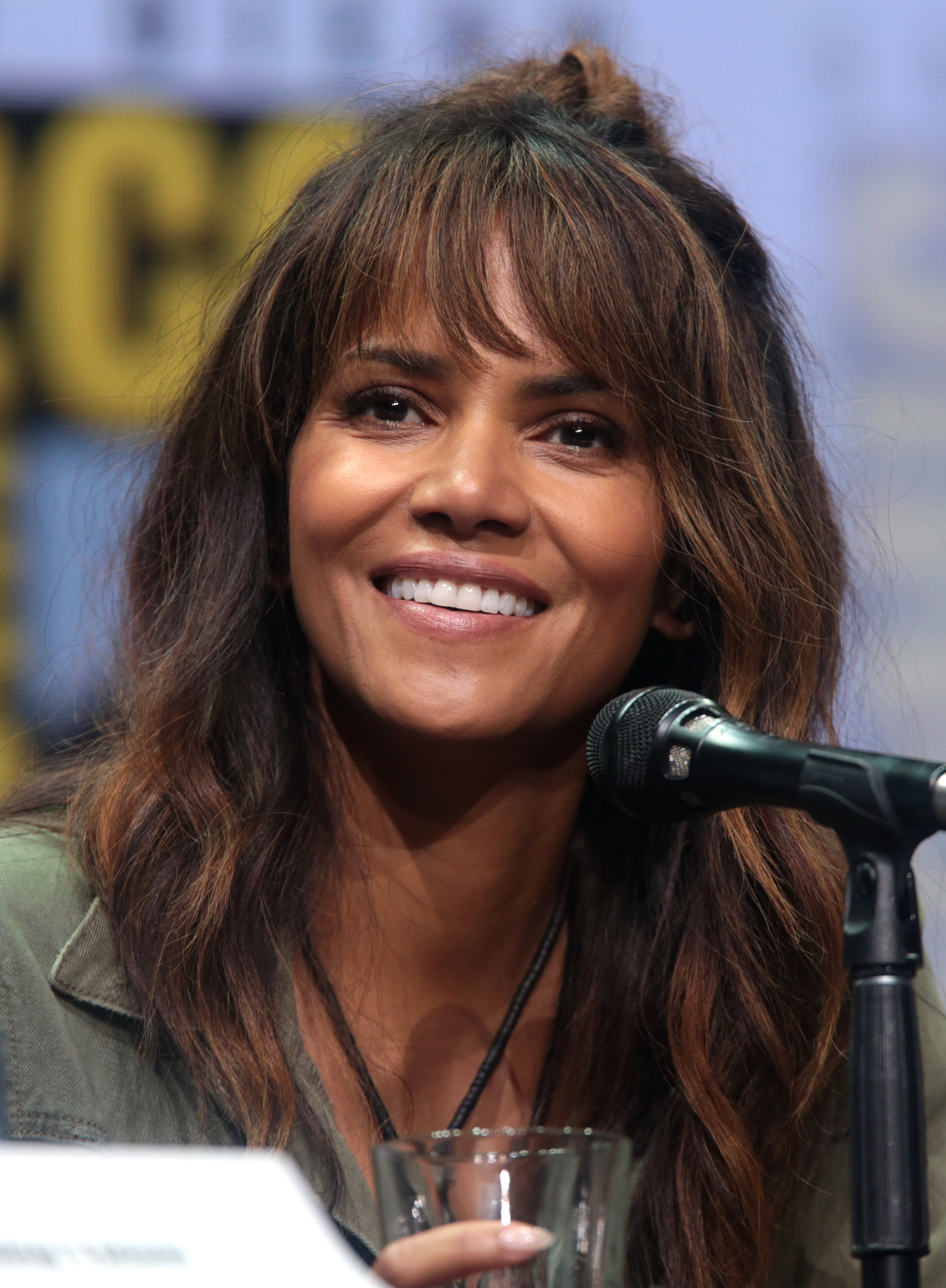
Berry at the 2017 San Diego Comic-Con

In the stand-up comedy concert film Kevin Hart: What Now? (2016), Berry appeared as herself, opposite Kevin Hart, attending a poker game event that goes horribly wrong. She provided uncredited vocals to the song "Calling All My Lovelies" by Bruno Mars from his third studio album, 24K Magic (2016). Kidnap, an abduction thriller Berry filmed in 2014, was released in 2017. In the film, she starred as a diner waitress tailing a vehicle when her son is kidnapped by its occupants. Kidnap grossed US$34 million and garnered mixed reviews from writers, who felt that it "strays into poorly scripted exploitation too often to take advantage of its pulpy premise — or the still-impressive talents of [Berry]." She next played an agent employed by a secret American spy organisation in the action comedy sequel Kingsman: The Golden Circle (2017), as part of an ensemble cast, consisting of Colin Firth, Taron Egerton, Mark Strong, Julianne Moore, and Elton John. While critical response towards the film was mixed, it made US$414 million worldwide.

Alongside Daniel Craig, Berry starred as a working-class mother during the 1992 Los Angeles riots in Deniz Gamze Ergüven's drama Kings (2017). The film found a limited theatrical release following its initial screening at the Toronto International Film Festival, and as part of an overall lukewarm reception, Variety noted: "It should be said that Berry has given some of the best and worst performances of the past quarter-century, but this is perhaps the only one that swings to both extremes in the same movie." Berry competed against James Corden in the first rap battle on the first episode of TBS's Drop the Mic, originally aired on October 24, 2017.

She played Sofia, an assassin, in the film John Wick: Chapter 3 – Parabellum, which was released on May 17, 2019, by Lionsgate. She is, as of February 2019, executive producer of the BET television series Boomerang, based on the film in which she starred. The series premiered February 12, 2019.

Berry made her directorial debut with the feature Bruised in which she plays a disgraced MMA fighter named Jackie Justice, who reconnects with her estranged son. The film premiered at the Toronto International Film Festival in September 2020 and was released on Netflix in November 2021. Berry received a positive review from Deadline for her performance.

In 2023, Berry signed with Range Media Partners as a producer and director. In 2025, she was announced as a member of the jury for Main Competition at the 2025 Cannes Film Festival. In 2026, she starred in the crime thriller film Crime 101, opposite Chris Hemsworth and Mark Ruffalo.

== Media image ==
Berry was ranked No. 1 on People's "50 Most Beautiful People in the World" list in 2003 after making the top ten seven times and appeared No. 1 on FHM's "100 Sexiest Women in the World" the same year. She was named Esquire magazine's "Sexiest Woman Alive" in October 2008, about which she stated: "I don't know exactly what it means, but being 42 and having just had a baby, I think I'll take it." Men's Health ranked her at No. 35 on their "100 Hottest Women of All-Time" list. In 2009, she was voted #23 on Empire's 100 Sexiest Film Stars. The same year, rapper Hurricane Chris released a song titled "Halle Berry (She's Fine)" extolling Berry's beauty and sex appeal. At the age of 42 (in 2008), she was named the "Sexiest Black Woman" by Access Hollywood's "TV One Access" survey. Born to an African-American father and a white mother, Berry has stated that her biracial background was "painful and confusing" when she was a young woman, and she made the decision early on to identify as a black woman because she knew that was how she would be perceived.

== Personal life ==
Berry dated the Chicago dentist John Ronan between 1989 and 1991. In 1993, he sued Berry for $80,000, claiming he had loaned her that amount to help launch her career. Berry contended that the money was a gift, and a judge dismissed the case because Ronan did not list Berry as a debtor when he filed for bankruptcy in 1992.

According to Berry, a beating from a former abusive boyfriend during the filming of The Last Boy Scout (1991) punctured her eardrum and caused her to lose 80% of her hearing in her left ear. She has never named the abuser, but she said that he was someone well known in Hollywood. In 2004, her former boyfriend Christopher Williams accused Wesley Snipes of being responsible for the incident, saying, "I'm so tired of people thinking I'm the guy [who did it]. Wesley Snipes busted her eardrum, not me."

Berry first saw baseball player David Justice on television playing in an MTV celebrity baseball game in February 1992. When a reporter from Justice's hometown of Cincinnati told her that Justice was a fan of hers, Berry gave her phone number to the reporter to give to Justice. Berry married Justice on January 1, 1993. Following their separation in 1996, Berry was so depressed that she considered suicide. Berry and Justice divorced in 1997.

In May 2000, Berry pleaded no contest to a charge of leaving the scene of a car accident; she was sentenced to three years' probation, fined $13,500, and ordered to perform 200 hours of community service. Berry married her second husband, singer-songwriter Eric Benét, in 2001, following a two-year courtship. They separated in 2003 and divorced in 2005. (Note: Attributed to multiple references:)

In 2005, Berry began dating the French-Canadian model Gabriel Aubry, whom she had met at a Versace photoshoot. She gave birth to their daughter in 2008. In April 2010, Berry and Aubry announced that their relationship had ended some months earlier. The following year, Berry and Aubry became involved in a highly publicized custody battle, (Note: Attributed to multiple references:) centered primarily on Berry's desire to move with their daughter from Los Angeles to France, the home of actor Olivier Martinez, whom Berry had started dating in 2010. Aubry objected to the move on the grounds that it would interfere with their joint custody arrangement.

In November 2012, a judge denied Berry's request to move her daughter. Less than two weeks later, Aubry and Martinez were both treated at a hospital for injuries after engaging in a physical altercation at Berry's residence. Martinez performed a citizen's arrest on Aubry and, because it was considered a domestic violence incident, was granted a temporary emergency protective order preventing Aubry from coming within 100 yards of Berry and their daughter, as well as Martinez. In turn, Aubry obtained a temporary restraining order against Martinez, stating that the fight had begun when Martinez threatened to kill him if he did not allow Berry and her daughter to move to France. Soon after, Berry and Aubry reached an amicable custody agreement in court. In 2014, a Superior Court ruling required Berry to pay Aubry $16,000 a month in child support, in addition to a retroactive payment of $115,000 and $300,000 for Aubry's attorney fees.

Berry and Martinez married in France on July 13, 2013. That October, Berry gave birth to their son. The couple divorced in 2016. In 2023, a divorce settlement was finalized that required Berry to pay Martinez $8,000 in monthly child support.

Berry started dating the musician Van Hunt in 2020, and they announced their engagement in 2026.

=== Activism ===
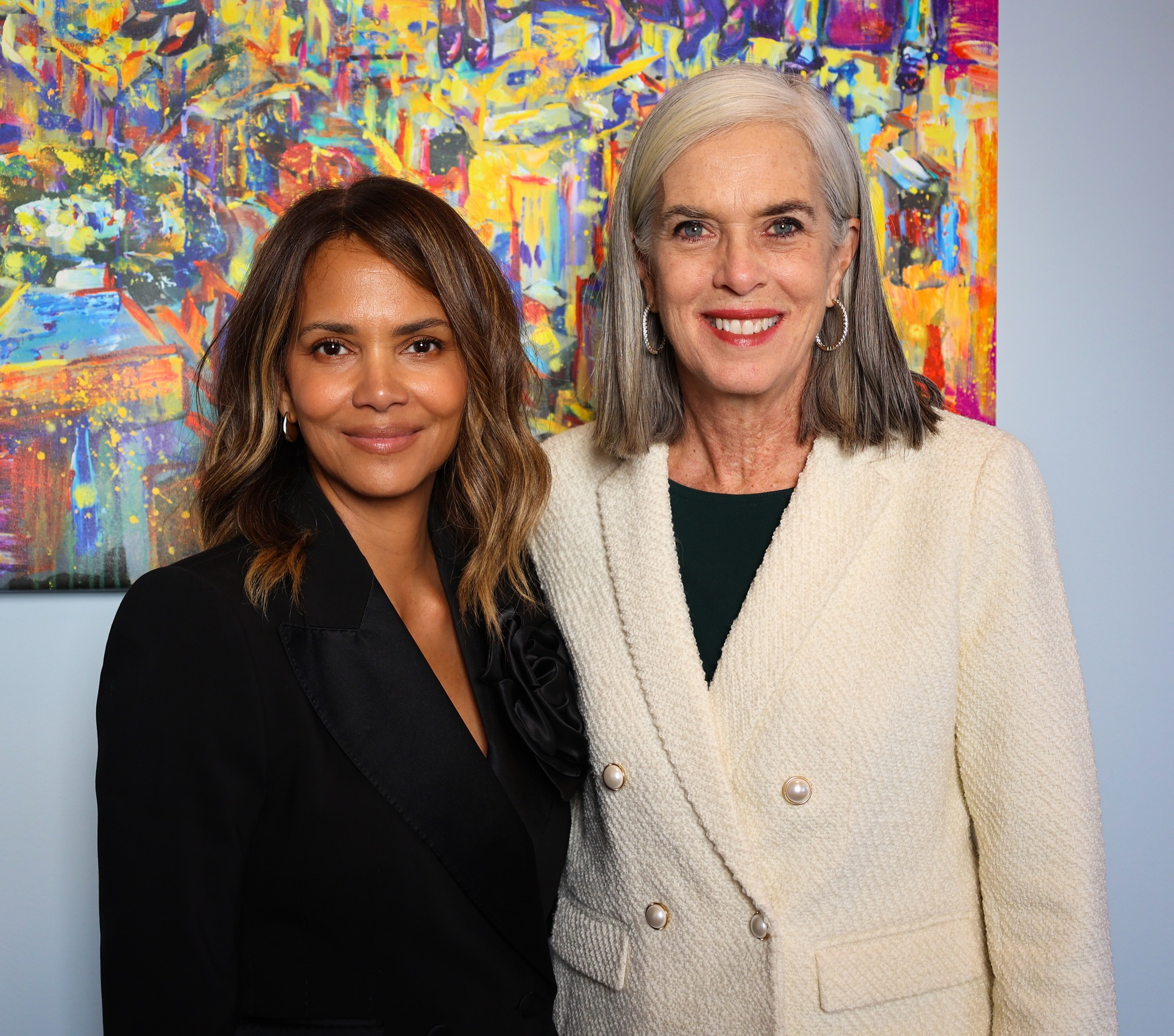
Berry with House Minority Whip Katherine Clark in December 2023

Along with Pierce Brosnan, Cindy Crawford, Jane Seymour, Dick Van Dyke, Téa Leoni, and Daryl Hannah, Berry successfully fought in 2006 against the Cabrillo Port Liquefied Natural Gas facility that was proposed off the coast of Malibu. Berry said, "I care about the air we breathe, I care about the marine life and the ecosystem of the ocean." In May 2007, Governor Arnold Schwarzenegger vetoed the facility. Hasty Pudding Theatricals gave her its 2006 Woman of The Year award. Berry took part in a nearly 2,000-house cellphone-bank campaign for Barack Obama in February 2008. In April 2013, she appeared in a video clip for Gucci's "Chime for Change" campaign that aims to raise funds and awareness of women's issues in terms of education, health, and justice. In August 2013, Berry testified alongside Jennifer Garner before the California State Assembly's Judiciary Committee in support of a bill that would protect celebrities' children from harassment by photographers. The bill passed in September.

In May 2024, Berry advocated for more research and education on menopause by supporting a bill introduced by Senators Patty Murray and Lisa Murkowski. Berry said, "I'm in menopause, OK?... The shame has to be taken out of menopause. We have to talk about this very normal part of our life that happens. Our doctors can't even say the word to us, let alone walk us through the journey."

== Filmography ==
=== Film ===
Year	Title	Role	Notes
1991	Jungle Fever	Vivian	
1991	Strictly Business	Natalie	
1991	The Last Boy Scout	Cory	
1992	Boomerang	Angela Lewis	
1993	CB4	Herself	
1993	Father Hood	Kathleen Mercer	
1993	The Program	Autumn Haley	
1994	The Flintstones	Sharon Stone	
1995	Losing Isaiah	Khaila Richards	
1996	Executive Decision	Jean	
1996	Girl 6	Herself	
1996	Race the Sun	Miss Sandra Beecher	
1996	The Rich Man's Wife	Josie Potenza	
1997	B*A*P*S	Denise "Nisi"	
1998	Bulworth	Nina	
1998	Why Do Fools Fall in Love	Zola Taylor	
1998	Welcome to Hollywood	Herself	
2000	X-Men	Ororo Munroe / Storm	
2001	Swordfish	Ginger Knowles	
2001	Monster's Ball	Leticia Musgrove	
2002	Die Another Day	Giacinta "Jinx" Johnson	
2003	X2	Ororo Munroe / Storm	
2003	Gothika	Miranda Grey	
2004	Catwoman	Patience Phillips / Catwoman	
2005	Robots	Cappy	Voice role
2006	X-Men: The Last Stand	Ororo Munroe / Storm	
2007	Perfect Stranger	Rowena Price	
2007	Things We Lost in the Fire	Audrey Burke	
2010	Frankie & Alice	Frankie Murdoch / Alice / Genius	Also producer
2011	New Year's Eve	Nurse Aimee	
2012	Dark Tide	Kate Mathieson	
2012	Cloud Atlas	Various Roles	
2013	Movie 43	Emily	Segment: "Truth Or Dare"
2013	The Call	Jordan Turner	
2014	X-Men: Days of Future Past	Ororo Munroe / Storm	
2016	Kevin Hart: What Now?	Money Berry	
2017	Kidnap	Karla Dyson	Also producer
2017	Kings	Millie Dunbar	
2017	Kingsman: The Golden Circle	Ginger Ale	
2019	John Wick: Chapter 3 – Parabellum	Sofia Al-Azwar	
2020	Bruised	Jackie "Pretty Bull" Justice	Also director and producer
2021	The Mothership	Sara Morse	Filmed in 2021, ultimately unreleased
2022	Moonfall	Jocinda "Jo" Fowler	
2024	The Union	Roxanne Hall	
2024	Never Let Go	Momma / June	Also executive producer
2026	Crime 101	Sharon Colvin	
TBA	Fleur	Fleur	Filming, also producer
TBA	Red Card	Amanda Bruckner	Filming

=== Television ===
Year	Title	Role	Notes
1989	Living Dolls	Emily Franklin	Main cast
1991	Amen	Claire	Episode: "Unforgettable"
1991	A Different World	Jaclyn	Episode: "Love, Hillman-Style"
1991	They Came from Outer Space	Rene	Episode: "Hair Today, Gone Tomorrow"
1991	Knots Landing	Debbie Porter	Recurring cast (season 13)
1993	NAACP Image Awards	Herself / Co-Host	Television special
1993	Alex Haley's Queen	Queen Jackson Haley	Episode: "Part 1-3"
1994	A Century of Women	Herself	Episode: "Part 1-2"
1995	Solomon & Sheba	Nikhaule / Queen Sheba	Television film
1996	Martin	Herself	Episode: "Where the Party At"
1996–1997	Essence Awards	Herself / Co-Host	Television special
1997	World Music Awards	Herself / Host	Television special
1998	Behind the Music	Herself	Episode: "Lionel Richie"
1998	Intimate Portrait	Herself	Episode: "Halle Berry"
1998	Mad TV	Herself / Host	Episode: "Halle Berry"
1998	The Wedding	Shelby Coles	Episode: "Part 1-2"
1998	Frasier	Betsy	Voice role; Episode: "Room Service"
1999	Introducing Dorothy Dandridge	Dorothy Dandridge	Television film; also executive producer
1999–2008	Biography	Herself	Recurring guest
2001	Great Streets	Herself	Episode: "The Champs Elysees"
2002	E! True Hollywood Story	Herself	Episode: "The Bond Girls"
2002	Mad TV	Herself	Episode #8.7
2002	The Bernie Mac Show	Herself	Episode: "Handle Your Business"
2003	Ant & Dec's Saturday Night Takeaway	Herself	Episode #2.8
2003	Saturday Night Live	Herself / Host	Episode: "Halle Berry / Britney Spears"
2003	Style Star	Herself	Episode: "Halle Berry"
2003	Punk'd	Herself	Episode #2.5
2003	Making the Video	Herself	Episode: "Limp Bizkit: Behind Blue Eyes"
2004	Rove	Herself	Episode #5.9
2004	Getaway	Herself	Episode: "Getaway Goes to Hollywood"
2004	4Pop	Herself	Episode: "Pärstäkerroin voittaa aina"
2005	Their Eyes Were Watching God	Janie Crawford	Television film
2009	NAACP Image Awards	Herself / Co-Host	Television special
2011	The Simpsons	Herself	Voice role; Episode: "Angry Dad: The Movie"
2012	Sesame Street	Herself	Episode: "Get Lost, Mr. Chips"
2014–2015	Extant	Molly Woods	Main role; 26 episodes (also executive producer)
2017	Drop the Mic	Herself	Episode: "Halle Berry vs. James Corden & Anthony Anderson vs. Usher"
2021	American Masters	Herself	Episode: "How It Feels To Be Free"
2022	Soul of a Nation	Herself	Episode: "Soul of a Nation Presents: Screen Queens Rising"
2022	Celebrity IOU	Herself	Episode: "Halle Berry's Beautiful Gift"

=== Video games ===
Year	Game	Role
2004	Catwoman	Patience Phillips/Catwoman

=== Music videos ===
Year	Song	Artist
1994	"(Meet) The Flintstones"	The B-52s
1998	"Ghetto Supastar (That Is What You Are)"	Pras featuring Ol' Dirty Bastard and Mya
2003	"Behind Blue Eyes"	Limp Bizkit

== See also ==
- List of African American firsts
- List of black Academy Award winners and nominees
- List of female film and television directors
- List of LGBT-related films directed by women

== Bibliography ==
- Banting, Erinn. Halle Berry, Weigl Publishers, 2005. ISBN 1-59036-333-7.
- Gogerly, Liz. Halle Berry, Raintree, 2005. ISBN 1-4109-1085-7.
- Naden, Corinne J. Halle Berry, Sagebrush Education Resources, 2001. ISBN 0-613-86157-4.
- O'Brien, Daniel. Halle Berry, Reynolds & Hearn, 2003. ISBN 1-903111-38-2.
- Sanello, Frank. Halle Berry: A Stormy Life, Virgin Books, 2003. ISBN 1-85227-092-6.
- Schuman, Michael A. Halle Berry: Beauty Is Not Just Physical, Enslow, 2006. ISBN 0-7660-2467-9.
