= Felix Braun =

Austrian writer (1885–1973)

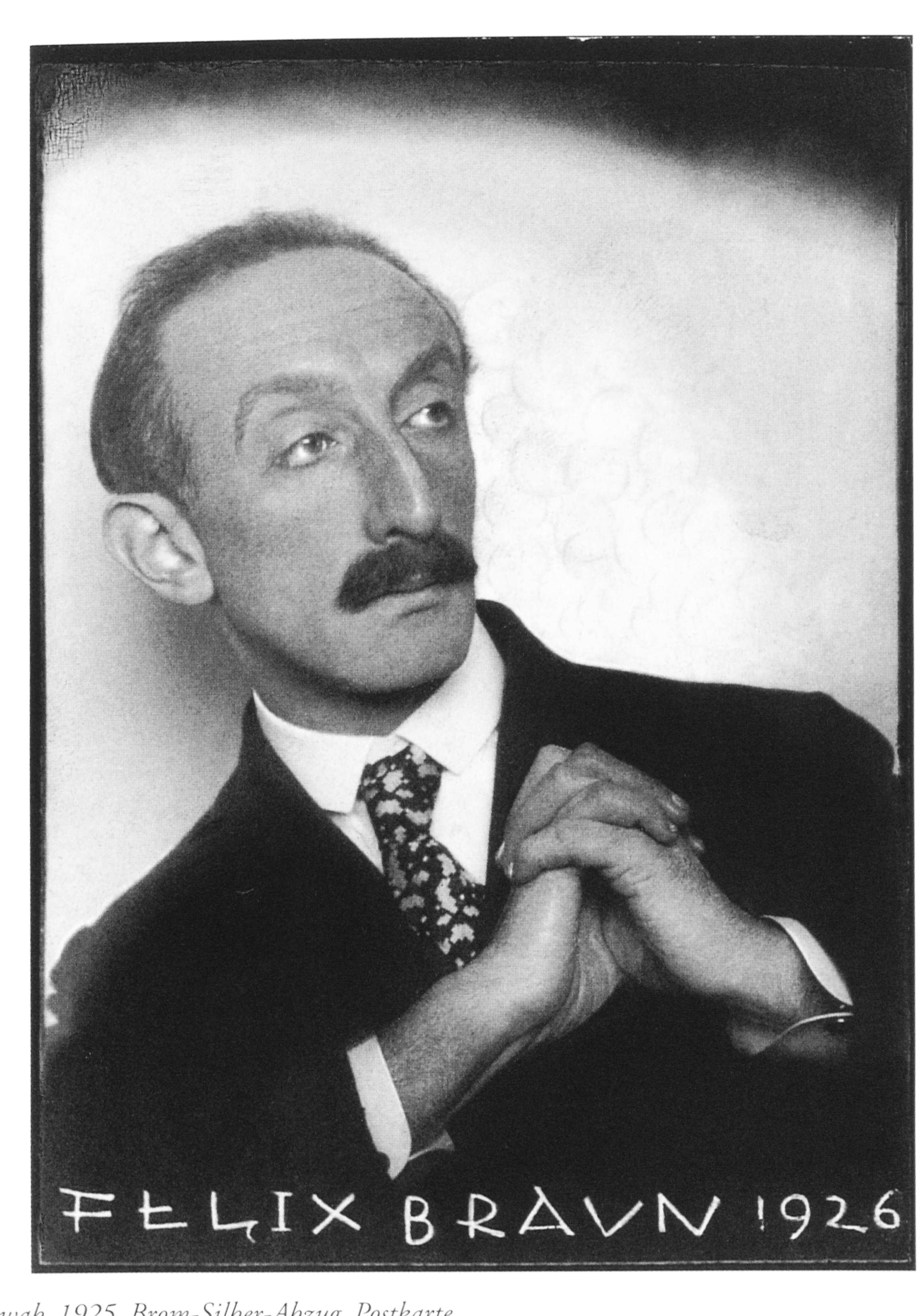
Felix Braun 1926

Felix Braun (4 November 1885, Vienna – 29 November 1973, Klosterneuburg, Lower Austria) was an Austrian writer.

== Life ==
Braun was born in Vienna, then capital of the Austro-Hungarian Empire, to a Jewish family. His mother died in 1888 during the birth of his younger sister, Käthe, who would also become a famous writer. In 1904, he enrolled in German studies, as well as art history, at the University of Vienna, and took his doctorate four years later. His literary publications began to appear in 1905 in the Neue Freie Presse, the Österreichische Rundschau, and in Die neue Rundschau. He was appointed arts editor of the Berliner National-Zeitung in 1910.

In 1912, Braun married Hedwig Freund, but the couple would divorce in 1915. While working as an editor at Verlag Georg Müller in Munich, he made the acquaintance of a number of important writers, among whom were Hans Carossa, Thomas Mann, and Rainer Maria Rilke. From 1928 to 1938, he was a Privatdozent in German literature at Palermo and Padua. He converted from Judaism to Catholicism in 1935. To escape persecution by the Nazis, who banned his work, he immigrated in 1939 to the United Kingdom and remained there until 1951, teaching literature and art history. After returning to Austria, Braun lectured at the Max Reinhardt Seminar and the University of Applied Arts Vienna. Braun died in 1973 and was honored with a burial in the Zentralfriedhof of Vienna. In 1977, a lane in Vienna was named after him.

== Writing ==
At the beginning of the 20th century, Braun belonged to the movement known as Young Vienna, where he found the company of such innovative writers as Stefan Zweig, Anton Wildgans, and Max Brod. Braun was a Neo-Romantic, who wrote refined, cultivated poetry in multiple forms. His work centered around the themes of religion, classical antiquity, and his Austrian homeland. Braun also served as secretary to the great Austrian writer Hugo von Hofmannsthal and formed a close friendship with his employer.

Braun edited and published a highly respected anthology of German lyric poetry, called Der Tausendjährige Rosenstrauch (The Thousand-Year Rose Bush), in 1937. It has been reissued in numerous editions and remains one of the most popular collections of its kind. He also translated the work of Thomas à Kempis and John of the Cross.

== Awards and honors ==
- 1947 Literary Prize of the City of Vienna
- 1951 Grand Austrian State Prize for Literature
- 1955 Ring of Honour of the City of Vienna
- 1955 Founder Medal of the Federal Ministry for Education
- 1965 Grillparzer Prize
- 1966 Austrian Cross of Honour for Science and Art
- 1977 Naming of Felix-Braun-Gasse in Vienna-Döbling

== Publications ==
- Gedichte, poems, 1909
- Novellen und Legenden, 1910
- Der Schatten des Todes, novel, 1910
- Till Eulenspiegels Kaisertum, comedy, 1911
- Neues Leben, poems, 1912
- Verklärungen, 1916
- Tantalos, tragedy, 1917
- Die Träume des Vineta, legends, 1919
- Hyazinth und Ismene, dramatic lyrics, 1919
- Das Haar der Berenike, poems, 1919
- Attila, legend, 1920
- Aktaion, tragedy, 1921
- Die Taten des Herakles, novel, 1921
- Wunderstunden, short stories 1923
- Der unsichtbare Gast, novel, 1924, rev. 1928
- Der Schneeregenbogen, 1925
- Das innere Leben, poems, 1926
- Deutsche Geister, essay, 1925
- Die vergessene Mutter, short stories, 1925
- Esther, play, 1926
- Der Sohn des Himmels, mystery play, 1926
- Agnes Altkirchner, novel, 1927, rev. 1965
- Zwei Erzählungen von Kindern, 1928
- Die Heilung der Kinder, short stories, 1929
- Laterna magica, short stories and legends, 1932
- Ein indisches Märchenspiel, 1935
- Ausgewählte Gedichte, 1936
- Kaiser Karl V., tragedy, 1936
- Der Stachel in der Seele, novel, 1948
- Das Licht der Welt, autobiography, 1949, rev. 1962
- Die Tochter des Jairus, drama, 1950
- Briefe in das Jenseits, short stories, 1952
- Aischylos, dialogue, 1953
- Viola d`Amore, selected poems from 1903 to 1953, 1953
- Das musische Land, essays, 1952, rev. 1970
- Die Eisblume, essays, 1955
- Rudolf der Stifter, drama, 1955
- Joseph und Maria, drama, 1956
- Irina und der Zar, drama, 1956
- Orpheus, tragedy, 1956
- Unerbittbar bleibt Vergangenheit, selected works, 1957
- Gespräch über Stifters Mappe meines Urgroßvaters, 1958
- Der Liebeshimmel, 1959
- Palermo und Monreale, 1960
- Imaginäre Gespräche, 1960
- Rede auf Max Mell, 1960
- Zeitgefährten, Begegnungen, 1963
- Die vier Winde, Christmas stories, 1964
- Schönes in Süditalien - Palermo, essays, 1965
- Anrufe des Geistes, essays, 1965
- Aufruf zur Tafel, mystery, 1965
- Das weltliche Kloster, short stories, 1965
- Das Nelkenbeet, poems from 1914 to 1965, 1965
- Frühe und späte Dramen 1909-1967, 1971
