= List of authors banned in Nazi Germany =

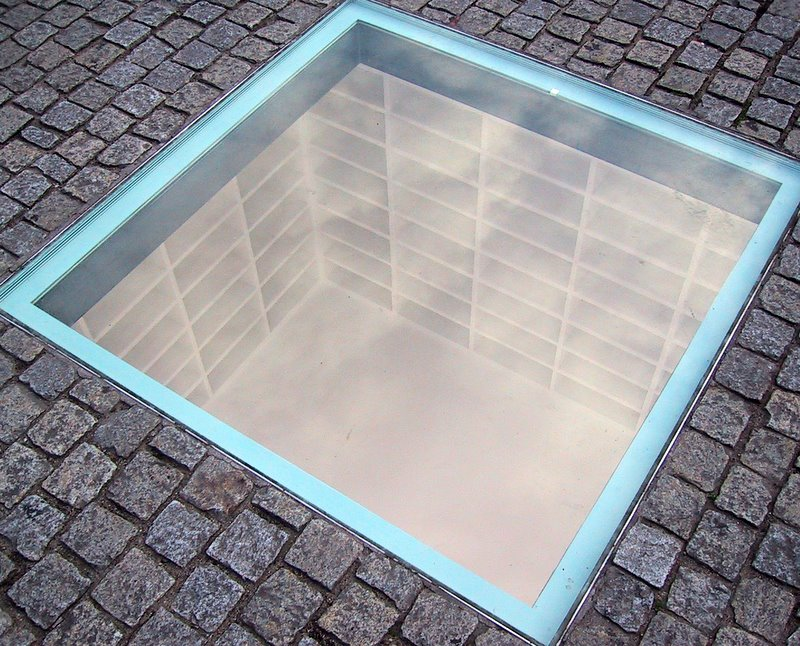
A memorial on Bebelplatz, site of a Nazi book burning in May 1933. Empty shelves are visible through a window in the pavement.

This list includes both authors whose entire literary production was officially banned in Nazi Germany and authors who were only partially banned. These authors are from the prohibitions lists in Nazi Germany and come from the following lists and others:

1. List of damaging and undesirable writing, Liste des schädlichen und unerwünschten Schrifttums, December 31, 1938
2. Jahreslisten 1939–1941. Unchanged new printing of the Leipzig edition, 1938–1941, Vaduz 1979

The official list was published by the Reichsministerium für Volksaufklärung und Propaganda (Ministry of Public Enlightenment and Propaganda). Authors, living and dead, were placed on the list because of Jewish descent, or because of pacifist or communist and/or Freemasonic sympathies or suspicion thereof.

In May and June 1933, in the first year of the Nazi government, there were book burnings. These book bans compose a part of the history of censorship and a subset of the list of banned books.

After World War II started, Germans created indexes of prohibited books in countries they occupied, of works in languages other than German. For example, in occupied Poland, an index of 1,500 prohibited authors was created.

Most serious efforts were dedicated to the writers of ethnic Jewish descent: In 1938, a team tasked by Alfred Rosenberg produced the Verzeichnis jüdischer Autoren (Register of Jewish Authors) that listed some 11,000 Jewish writers while in 1941 the Germans began the Bibliographie der jüdischen Autoren in deutscher Sprache: 1901–1940 (Bibliography of Jewish Authors in the German Language), initially supposed to contain some 90,000 names but ending up with 28,000 in March 1944 as the project was stopped due to a lack of personnel.

== A ==
- Alfred Adler
- Hermann Adler
- Max Adler
- Lou Andreas-Salome
- Raoul Auernheimer

== B ==
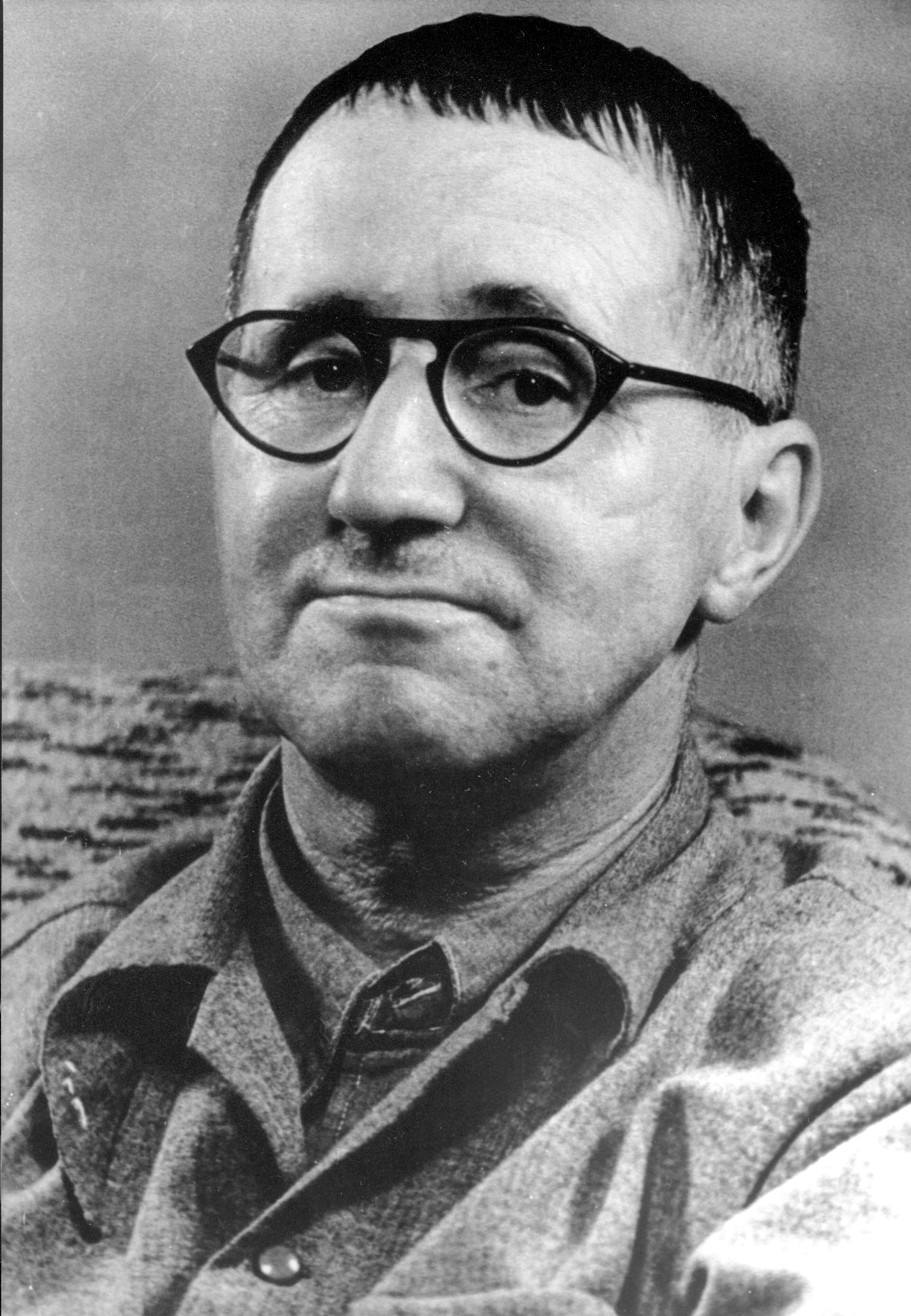
Bertolt Brecht

- Otto Bauer
- Vicki Baum
- Johannes R. Becher
- Richard Beer-Hofmann
- Hilaire Belloc
- Walter Benjamin
- Robert Hugh Benson
- Walter A. Berendsohn
- Ernst Bloch
- Felix Braun
- Bertolt Brecht
- Willi Bredel
- Hermann Broch
- Ferdinand Bruckner
- Nikolai Bukharin
- Richard Francis Burton

== C ==
- Albert Camus
- G. K. Chesterton

== D ==
- Leonardo da Vinci
- Dorothy Day
- Ludwig Dexheimer
- Alfred Döblin
- John Dos Passos

== E ==
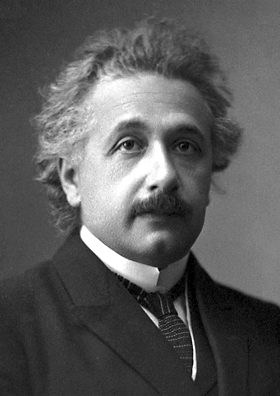
Einstein's official 1921 portrait after receiving the Nobel Prize in Physics

- Kasimir Edschmid
- Albert Ehrenstein
- Albert Einstein
- Carl Einstein
- Friedrich Engels
- Erasmus

== F ==
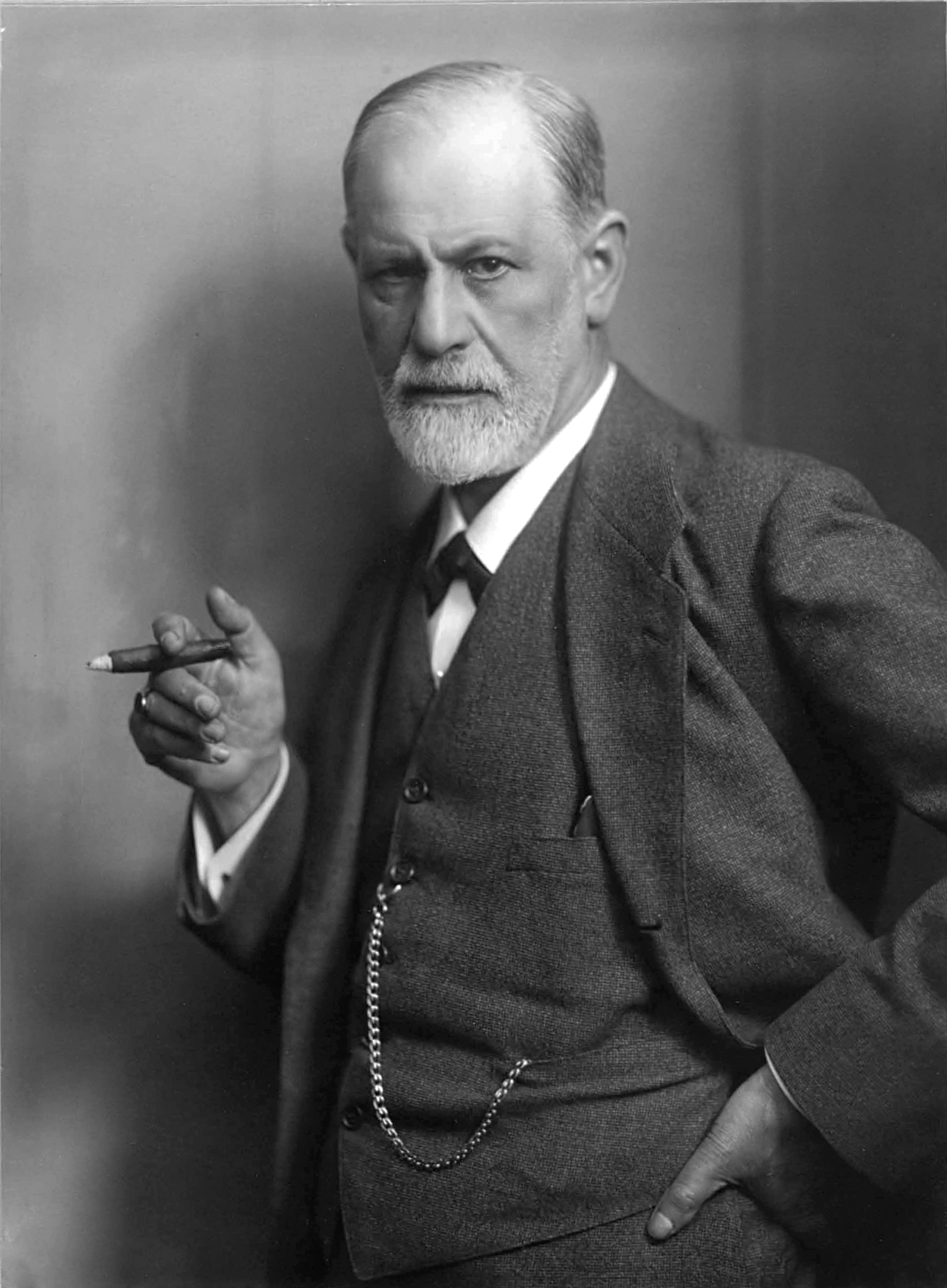
Sigmund Freud

- Lion Feuchtwanger
- F. Scott Fitzgerald
- Marieluise Fleißer
- Leonhard Frank
- Benjamin Franklin
- Anna Freud
- Sigmund Freud
- Egon Friedell

== G ==
- Ernst Glaeser
- Emma Goldman
- Claire Goll
- Oskar Maria Graf
- Karl Grünberg
- George Grosz

== H ==
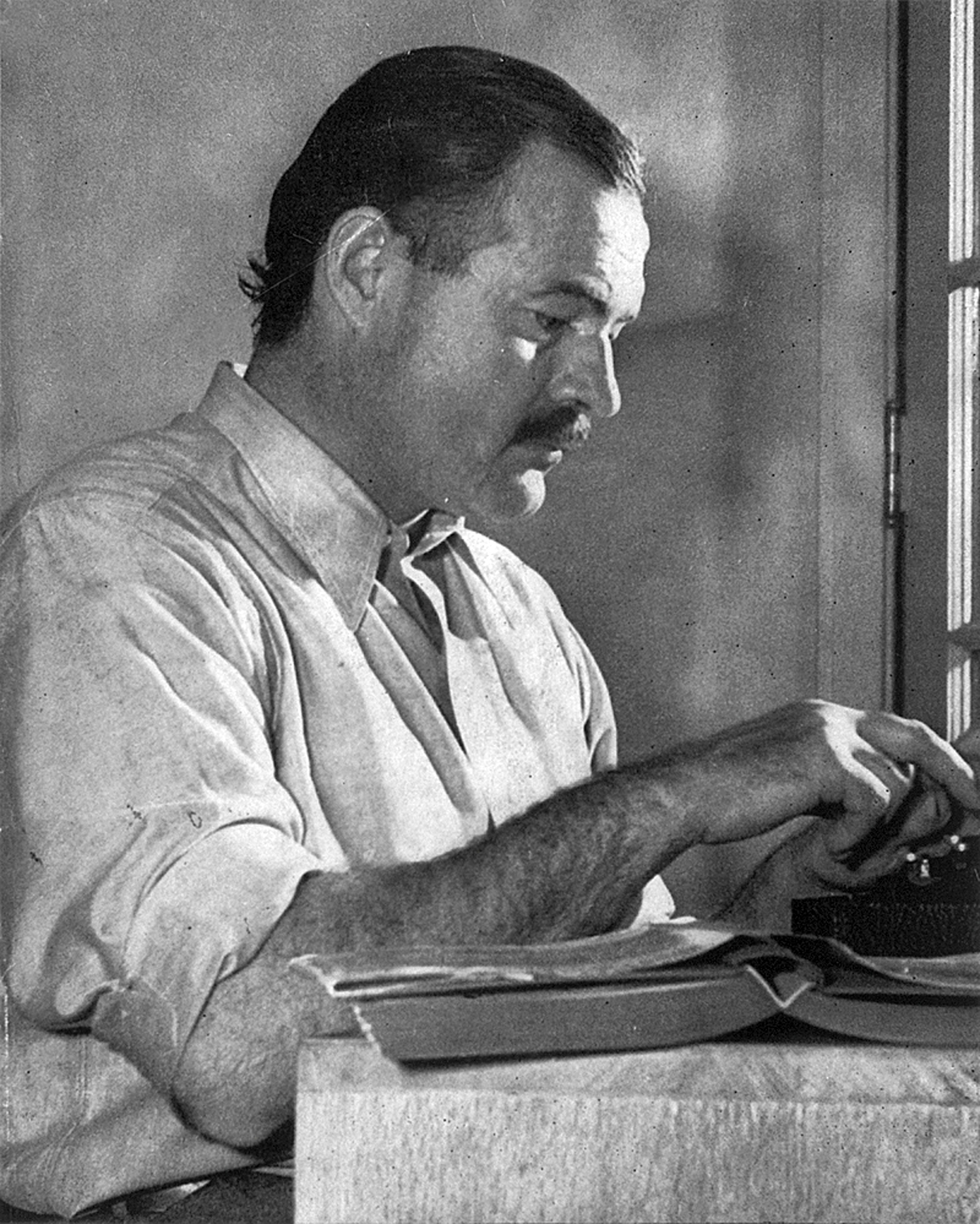
Ernest Hemingway

- Ernst Haeckel
- Radclyffe Hall
- Jaroslav Hašek
- Walter Hasenclever
- Raoul Hausmann
- Friedrich Hayek
- Heinrich Heine
- Ernest Hemingway
- Theodor Herzl
- Magnus Hirschfeld
- J. Edgar Hoover
- Jakob van Hoddis
- Ödön von Horvath
- Karl Hubbuch
- Aldous Huxley

== I ==
- Vera Inber

== J ==
- Hans Henny Jahnn
- Georg Jellinek
- James Joyce

== K ==
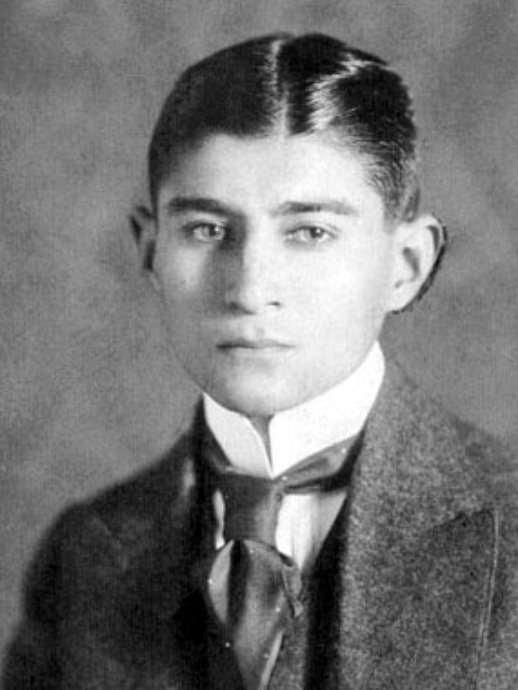
Franz Kafka in 1910

- Franz Kafka
- Georg Kaiser
- Mascha Kaleko
- Hermann Kantorowicz
- Erich Kästner
- Karl Kautsky
- Hans Kelsen
- Alfred Kerr
- Irmgard Keun
- John Maynard Keynes
- Klabund
- Heinrich Kley
- Annette Kolb
- Alexandra Kollontai
- Paul Kornfeld
- Siegfried Kracauer
- Karl Kraus
- Peter Kropotkin
- Adam Kuckhoff

== L ==
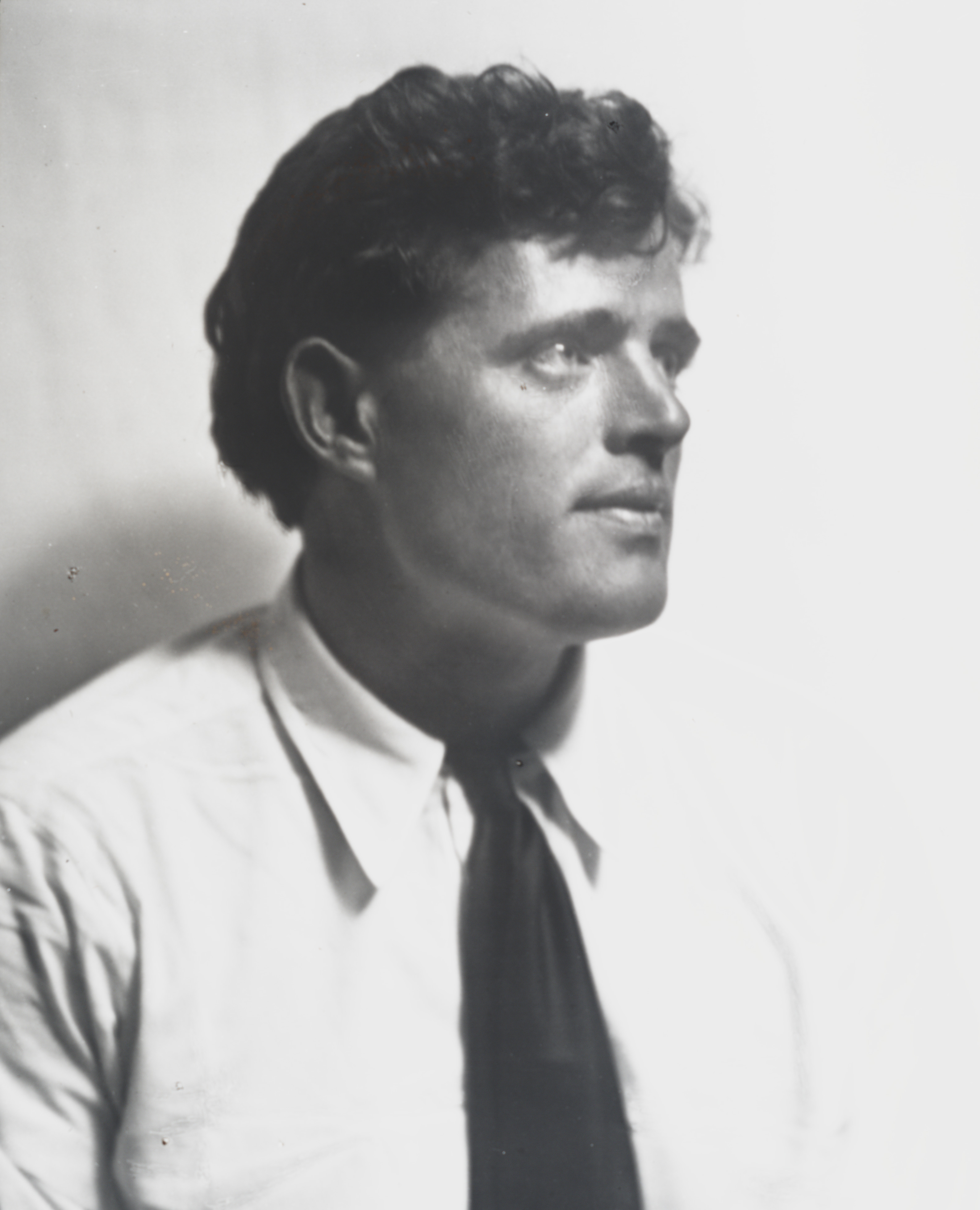
Portrait of Jack London, taken between 1906 and 1916

- Else Lasker-Schüler
- Vladimir Lenin
- Karl Liebknecht
- Jack London
- Ernst Lothar
- Emil Ludwig
- Rosa Luxemburg

== M ==
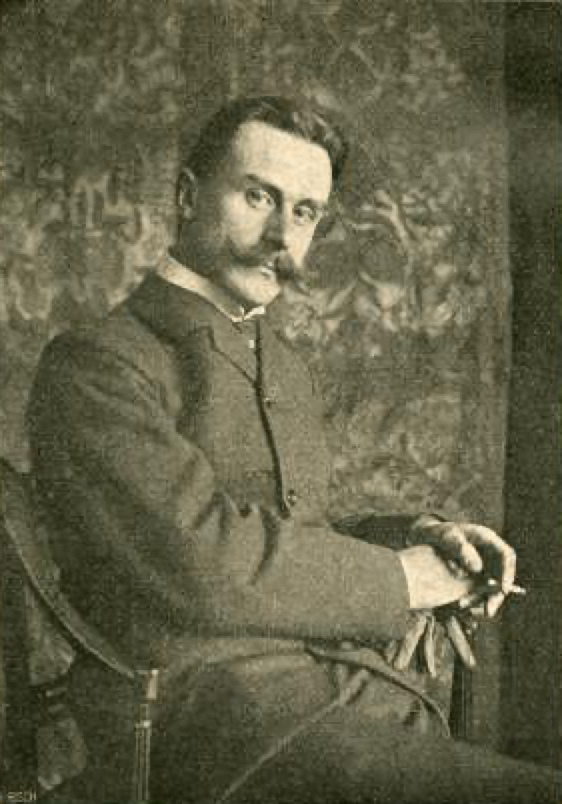
Thomas Mann in the early period of his writing career

- André Malraux
- Heinrich Mann
- Klaus Mann
- Thomas Mann
- Mao Zedong
- Hans Marchwitza
- Ludwig Marcuse
- Karl Marx
- Vladimir Mayakovsky
- Walter Mehring
- Thomas Merton
- Metro-Goldwyn-Mayer
- Gustav Meyrink
- Ludwig von Mises
- Montesquieu
- Erich Mühsam
- Robert Musil

== N ==
- Alfred Neumann
- Robert Neumann
- John Henry Newman

== O ==
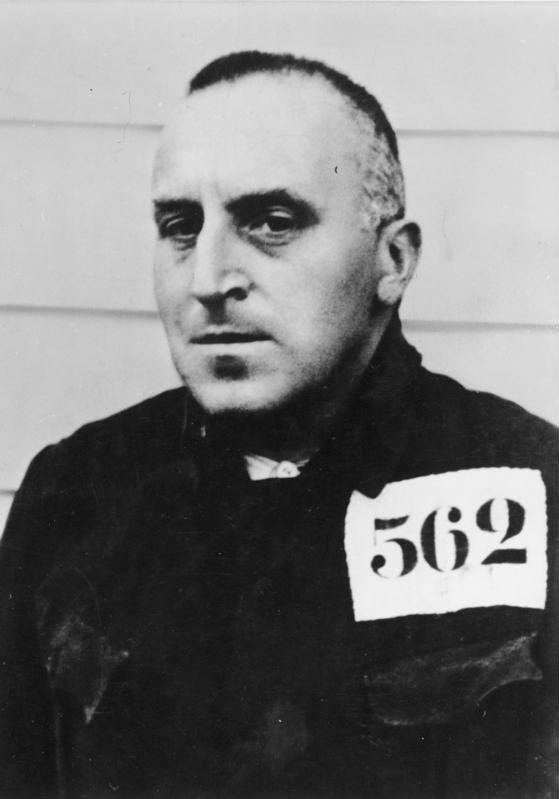
Carl von Ossietzky in Esterwegen concentration camp (1934).

- George Orwell
- Carl von Ossietzky
- Ouida

== P ==
- Hertha Pauli
- Adelheid Popp

== R ==
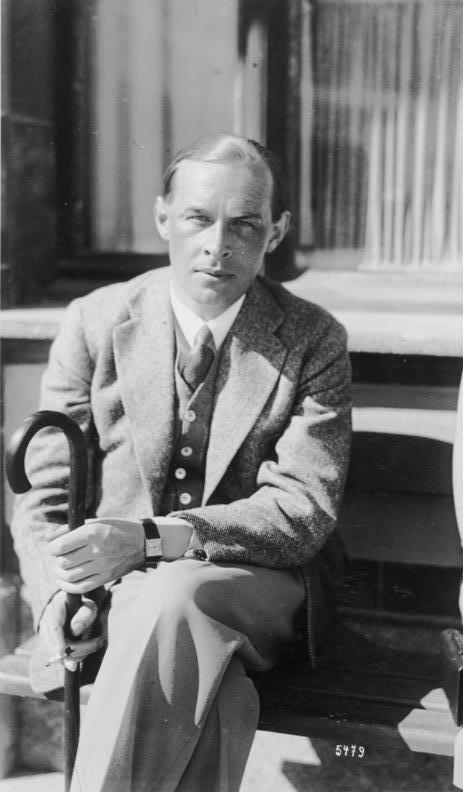
Erich Maria Remarque in Davos, 1929.

- Ayn Rand
- Fritz Reck-Malleczewen
- Paul Ree
- Gustav Regler
- Wilhelm Reich
- Erich Maria Remarque
- Karl Renner
- Rainer Maria Rilke
- Joachim Ringelnatz
- Joseph Roth

== S ==
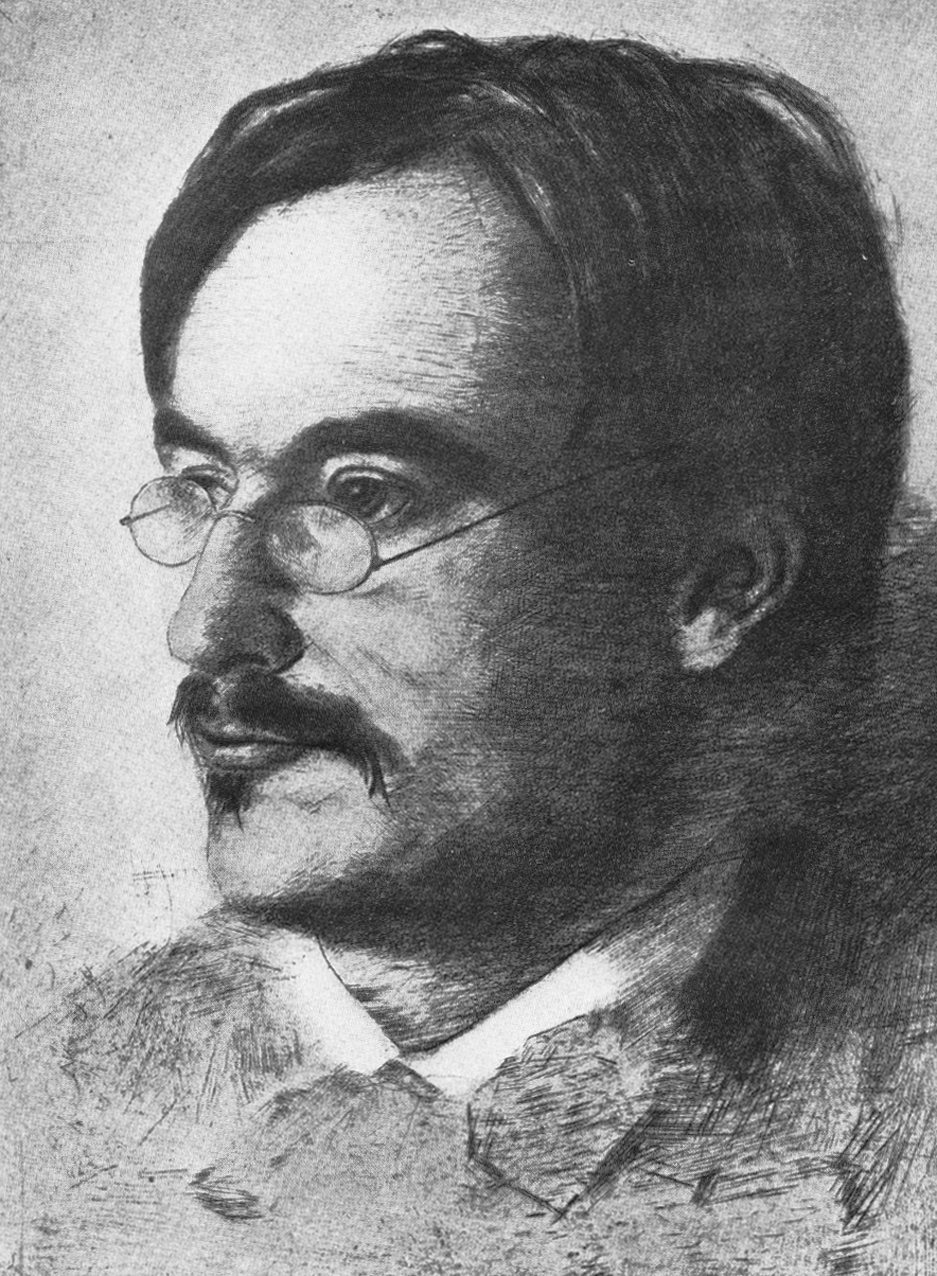
Rudolf Steiner around 1891/92, etching by Otto Fröhlich

- Nelly Sachs
- Felix Salten
- Rahel Sanzara
- Arthur Schnitzler
- Anna Seghers
- Walter Serner
- Fulton Sheen
- Ignazio Silone
- Spinoza
- Oswald Spengler
- Joseph Stalin
- John Steinbeck
- Rudolf Steiner
- Carl Sternheim

== T ==
- J.R.R. Tolkien
- Ernst Toller
- Friedrich Torberg
- B. Traven
- Leon Trotsky
- Kurt Tucholsky

== W ==
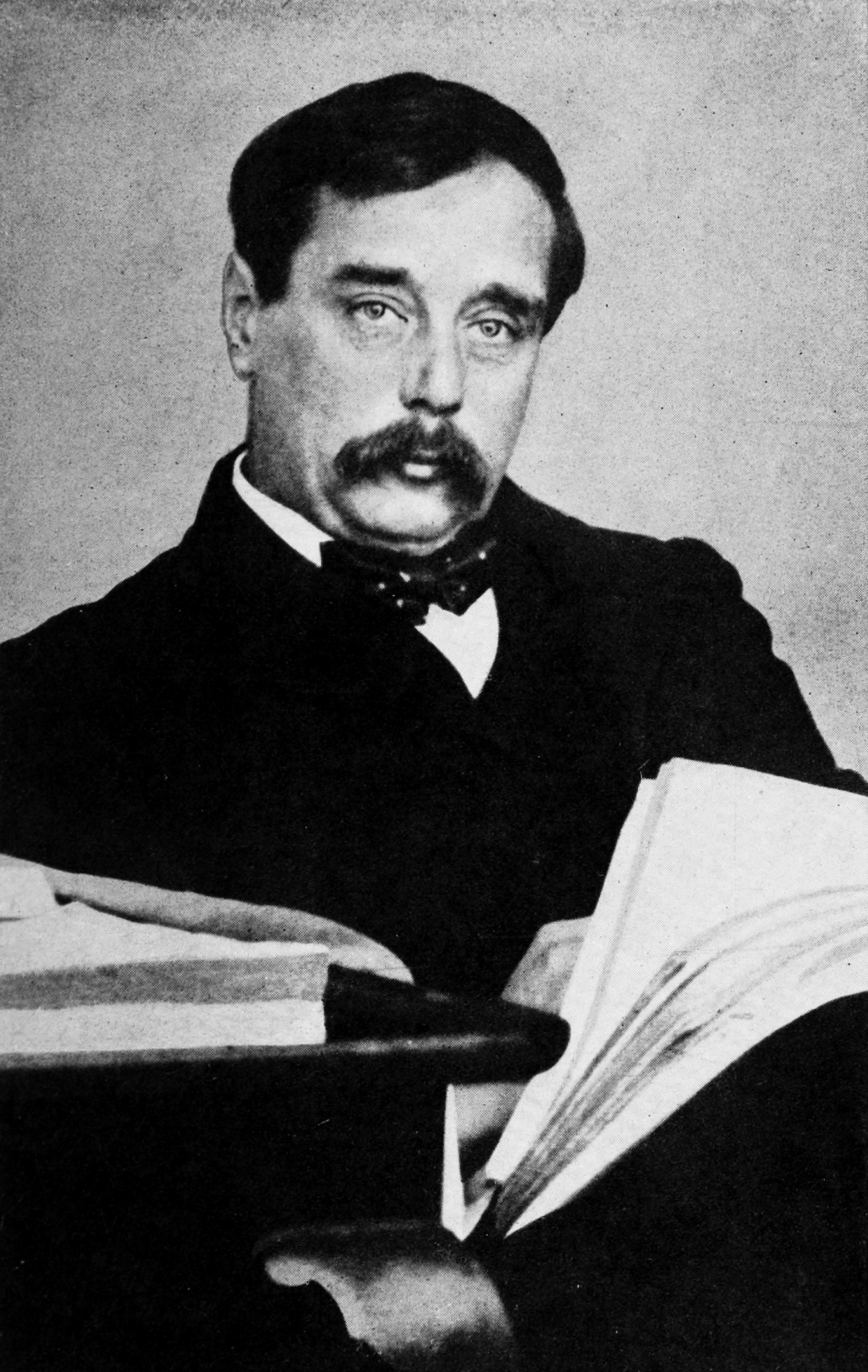
H. G. Wells circa 1918

- Warner Bros.
- Jakob Wassermann
- Armin T. Wegner
- Simone Weil
- H. G. Wells
- Franz Werfel
- Oscar Wilde
- Eugen Gottlob Winkler
- Friedrich Wolf

== Z ==
- Carl Zuckmayer
- Clara Zetkin
- Arnold Zweig
- Stefan Zweig

== See also ==
- List of books banned by governments
