= Franz Grillparzer Prize =

The Franz Grillparzer Prize was a literary award, named after the writer Franz Grillparzer. It was established in 1872, shortly after his death, by his lover, Katharina Fröhlich. After her death in 1879, the award was continued by a donation to the Austrian Academy of Sciences.

Until 1971, the prize was presented every three years to "das relativ beste deutsche dramatische Werk, das im Lauf der letzten 3 Jahre auf einer namhaften Bühne zur Aufführung gelangte und nicht schon vorher von anderer Seite durch einen Preis ausgezeichnet worden ist" ("the relatively best German dramatic work, which has been performed on a well-known stage during the last three years and has not been awarded a prize by another group").

== Prizes awarded by the Academy from 1875 to 1938 ==
- 1875: Adolf von Wilbrandt for Gracchus der Volkstribun
- 1884: Ernst von Wildenbruch
- 1887: Ludwig Anzengruber
- 1890: Adolf von Wilbrandt
- 1896: Gerhart Hauptmann for Hanneles Himmelfahrt
- 1899: Gerhart Hauptmann for Fuhrmann Henschel
- 1902: Otto Erich Hartleben for Rosenmontag
- 1905: Gerhart Hauptmann for Der arme Heinrich
- 1908: Arthur Schnitzler for Zwischenspiel
- 1911: Karl Schönherr
- 1917: Karl Schönherr
- 1920: Karl Schönherr for Kindertragödie
- 1923: Fritz von Unruh
- 1926: Franz Werfel
- 1929: Max Mell
- 1935: Josef Wenter
- 1938: Franz Theodor Csokor

The prize was not awarded in 1878, 1881, 1893 and 1932. In 1914, the prize was going to be given to Arthur Schnitzler for Professor Bernhardi, but the ceremony was cancelled following objections made by the philosopher, Friedrich Jodl.

== Prizes given by the City of Vienna, under National Socialism ==
The ceremonies were held under the auspices of the local Reichsgau and presided over by the Gauleiter and Reichsstatthalter, Baldur von Schirach. The jury consisted of eight persons appointed by him.

- 1940 Max Mell
- 1941 Ina Seidel
- 1942 Emil Strauß
- 1943 Mirko Jelusich, Josef Weinheber and Josef Wenter, for his lifework
- 1944 Erwin Guido Kolbenheyer

== Prizes awarded by the Academy from 1947 to 1971 ==
- 1947: Rudolf Holzer
- 1950: no award
- 1953: Rudolf Bayr
- 1956: Fritz Hochwälder
- 1959: no award
- 1962: Richard Billinger
- 1965: Felix Braun for Orpheus
- 1968: Friedrich Dürrenmatt for Der Besuch der alten Dame
- 1971: Thomas Bernhard for Ein Fest für Boris

In 1968, the award was originally set to be given to Dürrenmatt for his play, Die Physiker, but was changed when that play came under criticism for being "anti-science".

== The Grillparzer Prize since 1990 ==
In 1990, following an article by the cultural critic, Christian Michelides, lamenting the "disappearance" of the Prize, a "Committee for the Salvation of the Grillparzer Prize" was formed, but achieved nothing due to financial irregularities. The Minister of Culture, Erhard Busek, also refused to reinstate the Prize, citing lack of funds.

In 1993, a group known as the "Anonyme Aktionisten" (Anonymous Activists) sent over twenty-seven "Grillparzer Awards" to every well-known writer in Austria, by telegram. Notices were also given to various newspapers, with a different winner's name for each paper.
