= Young Vienna =

19th century society of writers

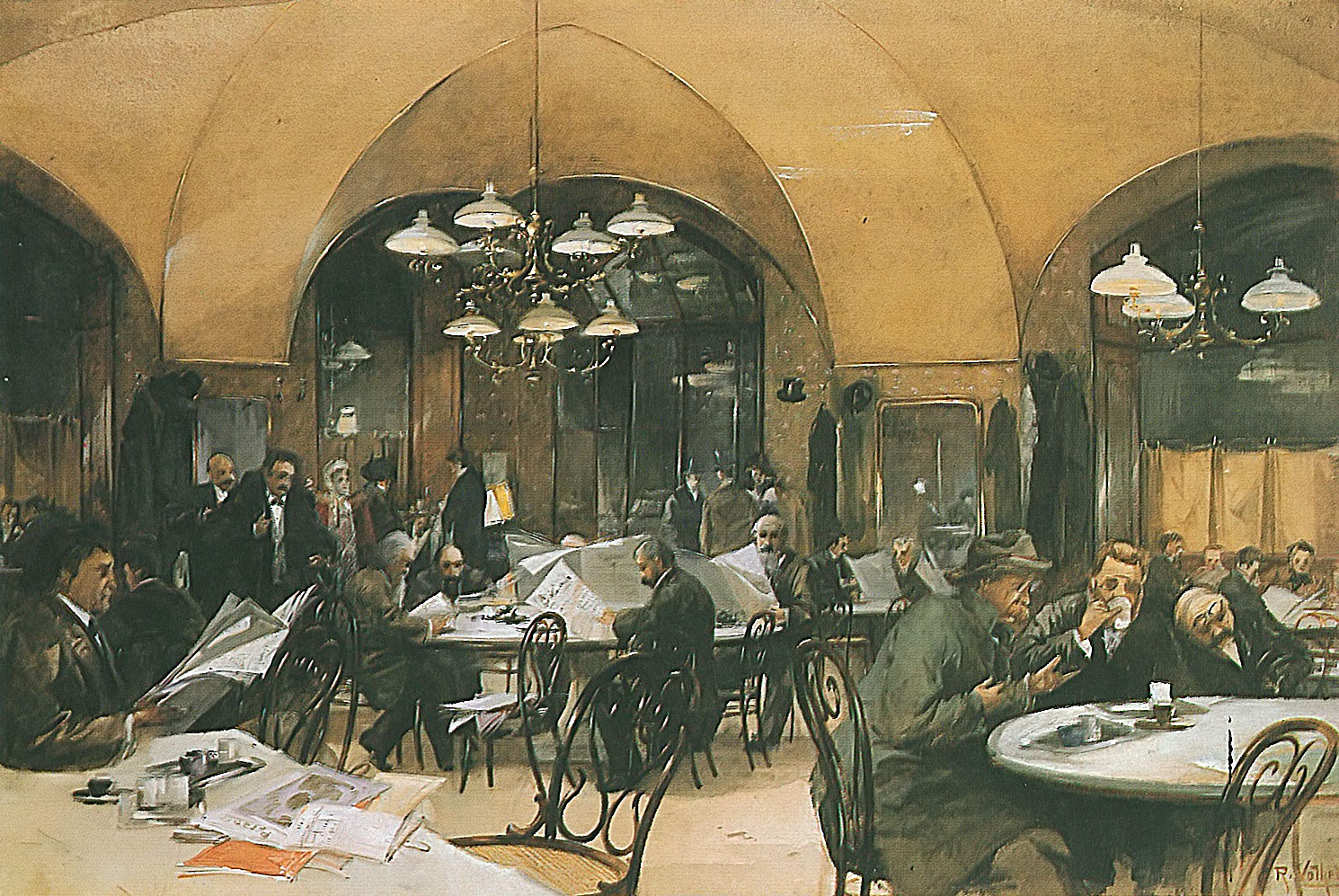
Café Griensteidl in 1896 (Reinhold Völkel)

Young Vienna (German: Jung-Wien), also referred to as Young Austria, was a society of fin de siècle writers who met in Vienna's Café Griensteidl and other nearby coffeehouses in the late nineteenth century.

== History ==
The group turned away from the prevailing Naturalism of the time and experimented with various facets of Modernism, including Symbolism and Impressionism. In his review of turn of the century Vienna, historian Carl Schorske wrote of the movement that it "challenged the moralistic stance of nineteenth century literature in favor of sociological truth and psychological - especially sexual - openness."

Hermann Bahr was considered the group's spokesman. Other members included Arthur Schnitzler, Felix Dörmann, Peter Altenberg, Richard Beer-Hofmann, Felix Salten, Raoul Auernheimer, Hugo von Hofmannsthal, and Karl Kraus. Kraus would later distance himself from the group, and in his essay "The Demolished Literature," written soon after the Café Griensteidl's demolition in 1897, he criticized the group and predicted that it "would soon expire for lack of a foyer." After the café's demolition the group (sans Kraus) continued to meet at the nearby Café Central.

Stefan Zweig, in his book The World of Yesterday, eulogized Vienna's fin de siècle coffeehouse culture, where for "the small price of a cup of coffee," a youth who aspired to intellectuality could "sit for hours on end, discuss, write, play cards, receive his mail, and, above all, [could] go through an unlimited number of newspapers and magazines" in search of news about literary, artistic, or philosophical happenings with which, good-naturedly, to show up his peers:

[I]n our constant childish, boastful, and almost sporting ambition we wished to outdo each other in our knowledge of the very latest thing, we found ourselves actually in a sort of constant rivalry for the sensational. If, for example, we discussed Nietzsche, who then was still scorned, one of us would suddenly say with feigned superiority, “But in the idea of egotism Kierkegaard is superior to him,” and at once we became uneasy: Who is Kierkegaard, whom X knows and of whom we know nothing?” The next day we stormed into the library to look up the books of this time-obscured Danish philosopher, for it was a mark of inferiority not to know some exotic thing that was familiar to someone else. We had a passion to be the first to discover the latest, the newest, the most extravagant, the unusual, which had not yet been dwelt upon at length, particularly by the official literary critics of our daily papers.

The group was satirized by Arthur Schnitzler, one of its members, in his novella Late Fame, which was written mainly in 1894–1895, but not published until 2014.

== Members and environment of the group ==
- Peter Altenberg, né Richard Engländer (1859, Vienna–1919, Vienna), writer and poet
- Leopold Andrian, né Leopold Freiherr Ferdinand von Andrian zu Werburg (1875, Berlin–1951, Fribourg), diplomat and writer
- Raoul Auernheimer (1876, Vienna–1948, Oakland), jurist and writer
- Hermann (Anastas) Bahr (1863, Linz–1934, Munich), writer, dramatist and critic
- Richard Beer-Hofmann (1866, Vienna–1945, New York), novelist, dramatist and lyric poet
- Jakob Julius David (1859, Mährisch Weißkirchen (Czech: Hranice na Moravě)–1906, Vienna), journalist and writer
- Felix Dörmann, né Felix Biedermann (1870, Vienna–1928, Vienna), writer, librettist and film producer
- Paul Goldmann (1865, Breslau–1935, Vienna), journalist, publicist, travel writer, theatre critic and translator
- Hugo von Hofmannsthal (1874, Vienna–1929, Rodaun), writer, dramatist, lyric poet and librettist
- Karl Kraus (1874, Jitschin–1936, Vienna), publicist, satirist, lyric poet, aphorist, dramatist and critic
- Anton Linder (1874, Lemberg–1928, Wandsbek), lyric poet, narrative writer, critic and translator
- Felix Salten, né Siegmund Salzmann (1869, Pest–1945), author and critic
- Arthur Schnitzler (1862, Leopoldstadt–1931, Vienna), narrative writer and dramatist
- Richard Specht (1870, Vienna–1932), lyricist, dramatist, musicologist and writer
- Frida Uhl Strindberg (1872, Mondsee–1943), writer and translator
- Jakob Wassermann (1873, Fürth–1934, Altaussee), writer
- Stefan Zweig (1881, Vienna–1942, Petrópolis), writer
