= Katharina Fröhlich =

Austrian philanthropist and patron of the arts

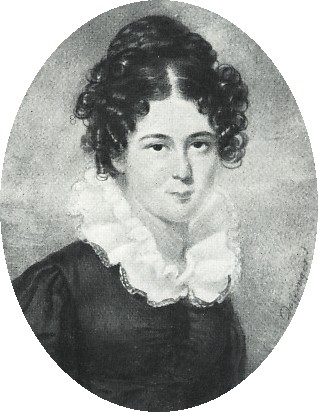
Katharina Fröhlich; miniature by Moritz Michael Daffinger, 1823.

Katharina "Kathie" Fröhlich (10 June 1800 – 3 March 1879) was engaged to Franz Grillparzer for 50 years. She founded the Schwestern-Fröhlich-Stiftung in Vienna, and became a patron of artists and writers.

== Life ==
Katharina Fröhlich was born in Vienna in 1800 as the third of four daughters of Matthias Fröhlich (14 April 1756 – 24 August 1843) and Barbara Mayr (1764–1841).

In 1821 she became engaged to Franz Grillparzer. In 1849 Grillparzer rented an apartment with Katharina Fröhlich and her sisters Anna, Josephine and Barbara in Vienna at Spiegelgasse 21. This household remained together until Grillparzer's death in 1872. Grillparzer, who never made good his promise to marry Katharina Fröhlich, bequeathed his entire estate to the sisters.

Fröhlich herself gave Grillparzer's inheritance to the city of Vienna and initiated the Franz-Grillparzer-Preis, which until 1971 was given every three years to the "in relative terms best German drama that was performed on a prominent stage in the last three years and that had not hitherto received an award."

Just before her death, she founded the Schwestern-Fröhlich-Stiftung, with the aim to promote artists and scientists. For example, Marie Eugenie Delle Grazie and Jacob David Julius were supported by the foundation.

Fröhlich died in 1879 and was buried in the Hietzinger Cemetery in Vienna, where her grave can still be seen (Group 7, Number 53).

In 1928/1929 a residential complex was built in Vienna's Malfattigasse, 149 apartments, and named Fröhlichhof in honor of Katharina Fröhlich.

The Fröhlich sisters' possessions and Grillparzer's original room can be visited in the Vienna Wien Museum.
