= Karl Adolph =

Austrian librarian and writer (1869–1931)

Karl Adolph (Vienna, May 19, 1869-ibidem, November 22, 1931) was an Austrian librarian and writer.

He also worked as a painting assistant and for the administration of Vienna General Hospital.

His works describe the life of proletarians and petits bourgeois in Vienna's suburbs.

== Works ==
- Lyrisches (1897)
- Haus Nr. 37 (1908)
- Schackerl (1912)
- Töchter (1914)
- Am 1. Mai (1919)

== Prizes ==
- Bauernfeld-Preis (1914)
