= Regionalmedien Austria =

- Country of origin: Austria
- Headquarters location: Am Belvedere 10 / Top 5; 1100 Wien
- Distribution: As of 2020 3.374.561 copies 3.336 million readers.
- Key people: Chief editor Maria Jelenko-Benedikt
- Official website: www.regionalmedien.at

Regionalmedien Austria (RMA) is an Austrian media company that produces free newspapers with local and regional content in all districts of Austria and also operates "meinbezirk.at", an online platform for numerous company-owned regional newspapers.

== Distribution ==
According to Österreichische Media-Analyse (MA, Austrian Media Analysis) in 2020, the local weekly newspapers under the RMA umbrella reached 3,336,000 readers, or 44.3% of the total national audience. The Österreichische Auflagenkontrolle (ÖAK, Austrian Circulation Audit) said the RMA overall distribution with partners for the second half of 2020 was 3,374,561 copies. The Österreichische Webanalyse (ÖWA Plus, Austrian Web Analytics) certifies that the website meinbezirk.at reached 33.6% of the population, which corresponds to a monthly average of 2,212,000 unique users.

== Corporate structure ==
RMA was formed in 2009 as a 50/50 joint venture of the Styria Media Group AG and Moser Holding. Since March 2017, Georg Doppelhofer and Gerhard Fontan have formed the Management Board of Regionalmedien Austria AG.

The RMA Group consists of RMA AG and the individual state companies. RMA has 82 offices in Austria, totaling about 800 regional employees. Editorial content and sales are managed at three levels: locally in each district, regionally in each province and nationally throughout Austria. Because of this structure, advertising can be booked and tailored at the district, state, and national levels, which gives flexibility in targeting.

The newspapers in the RMA-group are free and are distributed to households throughout Austria. The papers are entirely funded by advertising revenue. Gross revenues of RMA in 2019 were €95.4 million. 2019 earnings before interest, taxes and depreciation (EBITDA) were €13.9 million.

== Editorial policy ==
The editors of the newspapers throughout the Regionalmedien Austria are independent. The RMA local weekly newspapers and online portals deliver local news from the immediate environment of the reader. In addition, they report on statewide and Austria-wide news and events. Articles on topics of interest to all readers are provided under headings such as "Health", "Motor & Mobility", "Business & Career" and "Building & Living".

== Media ==
Regionalmedien Austria AG encompasses a total of 129 newspapers of the brands bz-Wiener Bezirkszeitung, Bezirksblätter Burgenland, Lower Austria, Salzburg and Tyrol, WOCHE Carinthia and Styria, the cooperation partners Bezirksrundschau Oberösterreich and Regionalzeitungen Vorarlberg, as well as the monthly magazines of Regionalmedien Carinthia and "der Grazer".

=== Ring Media ===
129 local editions (marketed nationally), published weekly Wednesday-Friday:

- bz-Wiener Bezirkszeitung with 23 district editions
- Bezirksblätter Burgenland with 6 local Issues
- Bezirksblätter Niederösterreich with 29 local Issues
- Bezirksblätter Salzburg with 7 local Issues
- Bezirksblätter Tirol with 12 local Issues
- WOCHE Kärnten with 12 local Issues
- WOCHE Steiermark with 18 local Issues
- Bezirksrundschau Oberösterreich (partner) with 17 local Issues
- Regionalzeitungen Vorarlberg (partner) with 5 local Issue

=== Magazines (not included in MA and ÖAK data for total RMA) ===
- der Grazer (weekly, Sunday)
- Draustädter, Feldkirchner, Gailtaler, Klagenfurter, Lavanttaler, Spittaler, St. Veiter und Völkermarkter LEBEN (monthly)
- Mein Sonntag (monthly)

=== Digital ===
Digital Media are:

- www.meinbezirk.at
- www.grazer.at
- www.rmk.at
- meinbezirk espresso – Nachrichten zum Swipen (App for Android and iOS)
- meinbezirk ePaper (App for Android and iOS)

In addition, RMA Gesundheit provides comprehensive health information with the MINI MED series of events, the magazine Hausarzt, gesund.at and minimed.at.
