= Obzorja =

Slovenian publishing house

Obzorja (The Horizons) is a publishing house in Maribor in Slovenia, founded in 1950. By 1989 it had published 3,223 literary works.

The publishing house has been particularly influential in Slovenian literature and contemporary writing in the country and has been a noted publisher of reputable German writers in the country. Notable German authors who have had works published by the Obzorja include the historian Rudolf Gustav Puff, the nationalistic poet Ottokar Kernstock, the novelist and essayist Alfred Maderno and the playwright Max Mell, prize winner of the "Grillparzer Ring".
