= Paul Angerer =

Austrian violist, conductor and composer (1927–2017)

- Born: 16 May 1927; Austria
- Died: 26 July 2017 (aged 90)
- Occupations: Conductor, composer
- Instrument: Viola

Paul Angerer (16 May 1927 – 26 July 2017) was an Austrian violist, conductor, composer and radio presenter.

== Life ==
Angerer studied music theory and composition with Friedrich Reidinger and Alfred Uhl, and conducting with Hans Swarowsky. He performed in the viola section of Wiener Symphoniker, Tonhalle Orchester Zürich and Orchestre de la Suisse Romande early in his career, and was viola soloist with the Wiener Symphoniker from 1953 to 1957. Angerer then began to conduct the Vienna Chamber Orchestra and the orchestras in Bonn and Ulm. From 1967 to 1972, he was principal conductor of the Salzburg Opera Theater (Salzburger Landestheater) and led the Südwestdeutsches Kammerorchester from 1971 to 1982. In 1982, Angerer began conducting the Concilium Musicum Wien and held a teaching position at the University of Music and Performing Arts in Vienna from 1982 to 1992.

Angerer was awarded the Austrian State Prize for Music in 1953 for his Musik für Viola allein and in 2001, he received the Austrian Cross of Honour for Science and Art, 1st class.

Paul Angerer's compositional style is influenced by that of Paul Hindemith. His works are published by Verlag Doblinger, Universal Edition, C. Haslinger and Editions M. Reift.

== Selected works ==
Opera

- Die Paßkontrolle, Television Opera (1958)

Orchestral

- Orchesterwerk I (1946)
- Orchesterwerk II (1947)
- Sinfonia III for chamber orchestra (1947)
- Musik für Streichinstrumente VIII for 15 stringed instruments (1950)
- Musik für Orchester (1950)
- Gradatio (1951)
- Sinfonia in A (1951)
- Concert pour la Jeunesse (1956)
- Musica fera (1956)
- Recordatio for 14 strings (1972)
- Ire in orbem for string orchestra (1975)

Concert band

- Angerer-Marsch (1986)
- Eisenbahn-Marsch (1987)

Concertante

- Sinfonia I for organ and chamber orchestra (1945)
- Concerto for viola, harpsichord and 5 winds (oboe, English horn, 2 bassoons, trumpet) (1946)
- Concerto for viola and chamber orchestra (1947)
- Concerto for harpsichord and 6 winds (flute, oboe, 2 bassoons, trumpet and trombone) (1950)
- Concerto for viola and brass sextet (3 trumpets, 2 trombones, tuba) (1950)
- Musik für Streichinstrumente IX for viola and string orchestra (1950)
- Responsorium for English horn and string orchestra (1951)
- Liberatio for violin and chamber orchestra (1952)
- Musik für Klavier und Streicher (Music for Piano and Strings) (1953)
- Musica ad impulsum et pulsum for violin, viola, cello and double bass soli, string orchestra and percussion (1955)
- Conference entre deux violoncelles for 2 cellos and chamber orchestra (1956)
- Konzert (Sonnerie) for harpsichord, string orchestra and percussion (1956)
- Gloriatio for double bass and chamber orchestra (1957)
- Concerto for viola and orchestra (1962, 1975)
- Concerto for 2 alto recorders and chamber orchestra (1962)
- Concerto for viola da gamba, strings and percussion (1962)
- Concerto for piano and string orchestra (1962)
- Quicquam for double bass and string orchestra (1977)
- Musica conquisita – pro fidicina et cordarum sonus for harp and string orchestra (1981)
- Musica exanimata for cello and chamber orchestra (1983)

Chamber and instrumental music

- Partita in E minor for viola and piano (1944)
- Musik for viola and piano (1945)
- Musik für Streichinstrumente I for string quartet (1945)
- Sonata in A for violin and piano (1945)
- Musik für Streichinstrumente II for 2 violas, cello and double bass (1946)
- Musik für Streichinstrumente III for violin solo, 2 violas, cello and double bass (1946)
- Trio for oboe, viola and bassoon (1946)
- Kammermusik for woodwind quintet (1947)
- Musik für Oboe und Streichinstrumente (1947)
- Musik für Streichinstrumente IV for 2 violins, viola, cello and double bass (1947)
- Musik für Streichinstrumente V, Trio for violin, viola and cello (1947)
- Sextett for flute, trumpet, bassoon, violin, viola and double bass (1947)
- Konzert für zwölf Instrumente for piccolo, flute, clarinet, bassoon, trombone, tuba, 2 violas, cello, double bass, piano and timpani (1948)
- Musik für Fagott, Streichinstrumente und Klavier (1948)
- Musik für Viola allein for viola solo (1948)
- Divertissement for flute, oboe and bassoon (1949)
- Duo for viola and cello (1949)
- Musik für Trompete, Streichinstrumente und Klavier for trumpet, 2 violas, cello, double bass and piano (1949)
- Musik für Violoncello allein for solo cello (1949)
- Musique pour alto et contrebasse for viola and double bass (1949)
- Musik für Streichinstrumente VI for 2 violins, viola, cello and double bass (1950)
- Musik für Streichinstrumente VII, Trio for 2 violas and double bass (1950)
- Certamen musicum for flute and horn (1951)
- Duo for violin and viola (1951)
- Flötenmusik for alto recorder and harpsichord (1951)
- Konzertantes Quartett for oboe, horn, viola and bassoon (1951)
- Oktett for clarinet, horn, bassoon, 2 violins, viola, cello and double bass (1951)
- Pastorale for viola da gamba (1951)
- Rectus motus for violin, viola and cello (1951)
- Serenata for violin, viola, horn and bassoon (1951)
- Sextett for oboe, English horn, trumpet, horn and 2 bassoons (1951)
- String Quartet (1951)
- Duo for alto recorder and viola (1952)
- Varia Vestis for 2 violins, 2 violas and cello (1952)
- Hornquartett for 4 horns (1953)
- Ruminatio for viola and piano (1953)
- Tänze (Dances) for 3 violins (1953)
- Toccata for 2 alto recorders and harpsichord (1953)
- Trio for oboe, horn and bassoon (1953)
- Trio for alto recorder, viola d'amore and lute (1953–1955)
- Invocatio for violin, cello and piano (1954)
- Musica exanimata for cello and piano (1954, 1983)
- Tänze (Dances) for violin and piano (1955)
- Etüde: Eine Technische und Durchaus Musikalische Etüde for violin and piano (1956)
- Quintett for flute, oboe, clarinet, horn and bassoon (1956)
- Tre Poemi per Angelo for trumpet, horn and 2 trombones (1957)
- Trio for violin, recorder and guitar (1961)
- Chanson Gaillarde for oboe (or violin), cello (or bassoon) and harpsichord (or piano) (1963)
- Cogitatio for flute, oboe, clarinet, horn, bassoon, violin, viola, cello and double bass (1964)
- Musica articolata for 13 winds (1970)
- Oblectatio vespertina for flute and harp (1970)
- Quartett I for alto recorder, viola da gamba, guitar and percussion (1971)
- Trio I Bruchstücke for flute, oboe and cello (1971)
- Trio II Floskeln for violin, cello and piano (1973)
- Conjunctio for violin and harp (1975)
- Trio III Syngrapha for violin, viola and cello (1975)
- Il promesso for 8 flutes (1976)
- Minutatim for violin solo (1978)
- Exercitium Canonicum, 4 Canonic Pieces for 2 violas (1980)
- Colloquio concertante for flute, oboe, violin, viola and cello (1982)
- Obolus for 6 oboes (1983)
- Trifolium octangulum for viola d'amore, hammered dulcimer and cello (1983)
- Tubilustrium: Eine Übung im Blasen for tuba and piano (1985)
- Oculus for horn, 2 trumpets, trombone and tuba (1986)
- Quartett for 9 recorders (1986)
- HiLaRaTiO for viola d'amore, transverse flute, violin and double bass (1987)
- Blechsalat for 3 trumpets and 3 trombones (1989)
- Quadriga for 4 trombones (1990)
- Sinfonia, Wiegenlied und Tanz for viola d'amore, violin and double bass (or cello) (1993)
- Fetzig for horn and piano (1996)
- Drei Stücke für 3 Hörner I for 3 horns (1996)
- Drei Stücke für 3 Hörner II for 3 horns (1996)
- Drei Stücke für 3 Hörner III for 3 horns (1996)
- Ein Thema, 3 Pieces for horn and piano (1996)
- Musica pro cornuario profundo for horn and piano (1996)
- quartilatus medium et facile, 4 Pieces for horn and piano (1996)
- quatuor capitibus, 3 Pieces for 4 horns (1996)
- Terz, Quart und Quint, 3 Pieces for 2 horns (1996)
- 4 Stücke for horn and piano (1996)
- 2 Stücke für tiefes Horn und Klavier (1996)
- Wettstreit zwischen Dur und Moll for 2 violas d'amore (1997)
- Oblectatio vespertina for trombone and harp (1998)
- Octangulum for viola d'amore and piano (1999)

Harp

- Stadium Veronicae, 6 Pieces (1971)
- La Nostalgia: Walzer-Paraphrase (1977)

Harpsichord and clavichord

- 4 Orgelpfeifen stellen sich vor, 4 Little Pieces for clavichord (1946)
- 5 Toccaten (1957)
- Una mesata (1985)

Organ

- Der du bist drei in Einigkeit, Chorale Fantasy (1944)
- Gib Fried, o frommer, treuer Gott, Chorale Prelude (1944)
- Flügelaltar: Musica pro Organo III nach Herbert Boeckl (1946)
- Musica pro organo (1946)
- Praeambulum in drei Teilen und Fuge (1946)
- Resurrectio, Musica Sacra (1946)
- 4 Praeambeln (1953)
- Praeludium und Fuge Halapé (1954)
- Praeambulum und Fuge for positive organ (1960)
- Luctus et gaudium (1980)
- Christ ist erstanden, Chorale Variations (1995)

Piano

- 5 Fugen (1944)
- Passacaglia in G minor (1944)
- Präludium und Fuge in F minor (1944)
- Sonata in F major (1944)
- Sonatina in D major (1944)
- Toccata in G major (1944)
- Variationen über ein Thema von Joseph Haydn (1944)
- Variationen über ein Thema von Wolfgang Amadeus Mozart for piano 4-hands (1945)
- Annexus musicae cum ratione for piano 4-hands (1946)
- Hausmusik for piano 4-hands (1946)
- Schlagstück for piano 4-hands (1946)
- Progressio (1952)
- Sempre legato (1953)
- Stimmungen, 5 Pieces (1955)
- 3 Klavierstücke (1973–1974)

Vocal

- 2 Lieder for mezzo-soprano and piano or string trio (1949); words by Barbara Peter
- Triptychon, 3 Songs for baritone, 2 oboes, 2 bassoon, trumpet and trombone (1949); words by Barbara Peter
- Abendlied eines Bauernmanns for baritone and string orchestra (1950); words by Matthias Claudius
- 3 Narrenlieder for baritone and piano (1960); words from As You Like It by William Shakespeare
- Einsame Träume, Rilke Variations for soprano, baritone and chamber orchestra (1965); words by Rainer Maria Rilke
- Code maçonnique for bass and piano (1979)
- Communio for soprano and organ (1995)
- 5 Lieder for soprano and string orchestra (1998); words by Elisabeth of Bavaria

Choral

- Gesang von mir selbst for soloists, chorus and orchestra (1946); words by Walt Whitman
- Missa pro coro a cappella (1946)
- Sinfonia II Domenica in passione for boys' chorus and orchestra (1946)
- Messe for chorus, ensemble and organ (1947)
- Auf meinen lieben Gott, Cantata for soprano, chorus and chamber ensemble (1948); words by Sigmund Weingartner
- Wen der Himmel retten will, dem gibt er die Liebe, Oratorio for soprano, tenor, baritone, mixed chorus and orchestra (1949); words by Lao Tse
- Der jüngste Tag for chorus, 2 (or more) violas, cello and double bass (1951); words by Christian Friedrich Daniel Schubart
- Agamemnon muß sterben (Agamemnon Must Die), Cantata for mezzo-soprano, tenor, baritone, speaker, 2 choruses and orchestra (1954–1955); words by Rudolf Bayr
- Die Vogelscheuche for 3-part boys' chorus a cappella (1956); words by Wladimir von Hartlieb
- Legende von Oedipus, Cantata for baritone, narrator, mixed chorus and orchestra (1956); words by Rudolf Bayr
- Gedicht 13.5.1941 for mixed chorus a cappella (1962); words by Pablo Picasso
- Kantate zur Eröffnung der Fritz-Erler-Schule for chorus, viola, piano and percussion (1976)
- Vier Chöre (4 Choruses) (1982); words from the Latin comedy Henno by Johannes Reuchlin
- Missa Seitenstettensis, German Mass for cantor, chorus, brass, timpani and organ (1987)
- Fünf lateinische Sinnsprüche for male chorus (1990)
- Geraser Orgelmesse for cantor, chorus and organ (1995)
- Flügelschlag for children's chorus and piano (1999)
