= Bauernfeld Prize =

Austrian literary prize that was awarded between 1894 and 1921

The Bauernfeld Prize or Bauernfeld-Preis was a literary prize that was awarded between 1894 and 1921 in memory of Eduard von Bauernfeld.

== Laureates ==
- 1899 Arthur Schnitzler
- 1901 Marie Eugenie Delle Grazie
- 1902 Stephan von Millenkovich and Felix Dörmann
- 1903 Joseph Medelsky
- 1904 Marie Herzfeld and Wilhelm Hegeler
- 1904 Hermann Hesse
- 1908 Karl Schönherr
- 1910 Fritz Stüber-Gunther
- 1911 Erwin Guido Kolbenheyer
- 1914 Max Mell
- 1917 Wladimir Freiherr von Hartlieb
- 1918 Ernst Lothar
- 1919 Paul Wertheimer
- 1920 Victor Fleischer
- 1921 Robert Hohlbaum and Franz Nabl
- Frank Wedekind
- Joseph Roth
