= Fritz von Unruh =

German expressionist writer (1885-1970)

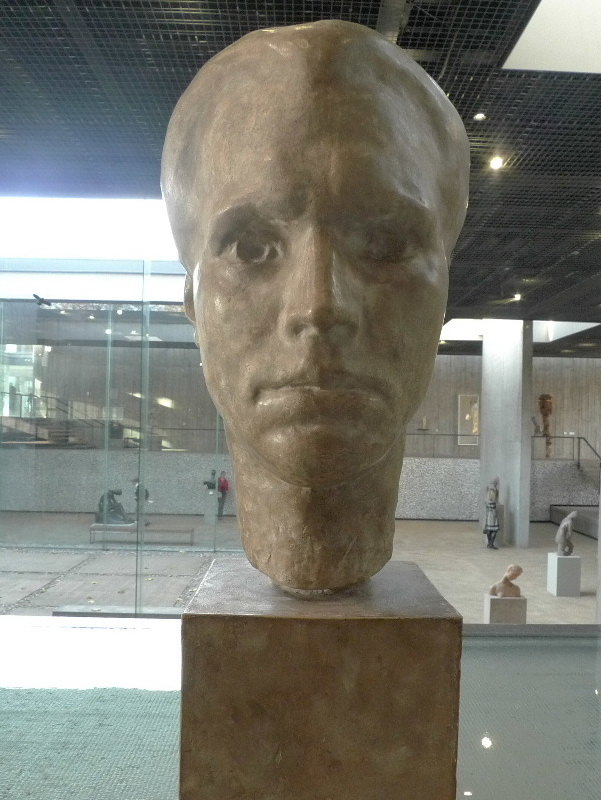
- Porträtkopf Fritz von Unruh (1918)
- Born: 10 May 1885; Koblenz, Rhine Province, Germany
- Died: 28 November 1970 (aged 85); Diez an der Lahn, Germany
- Occupations: Dramatist, poet, novelist
- Writing career
- Movement: Expressionism

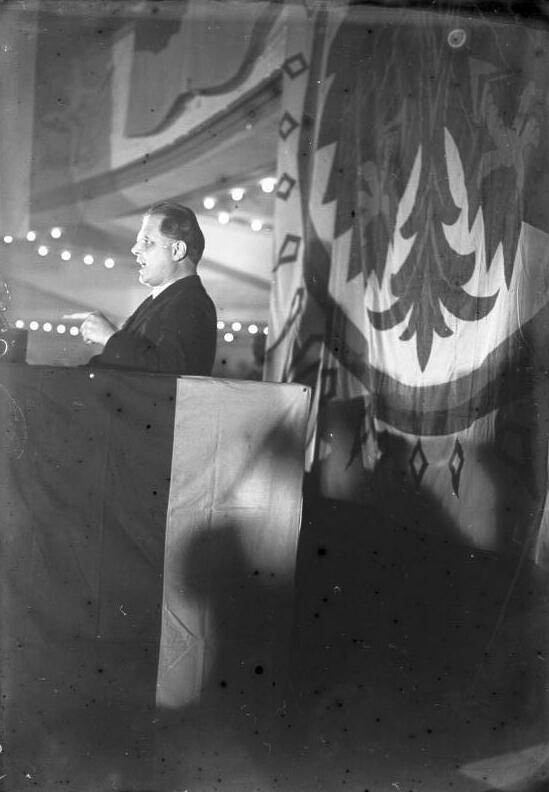
Fritz von Unruh, speaking at a rally for the Iron Front (1932)

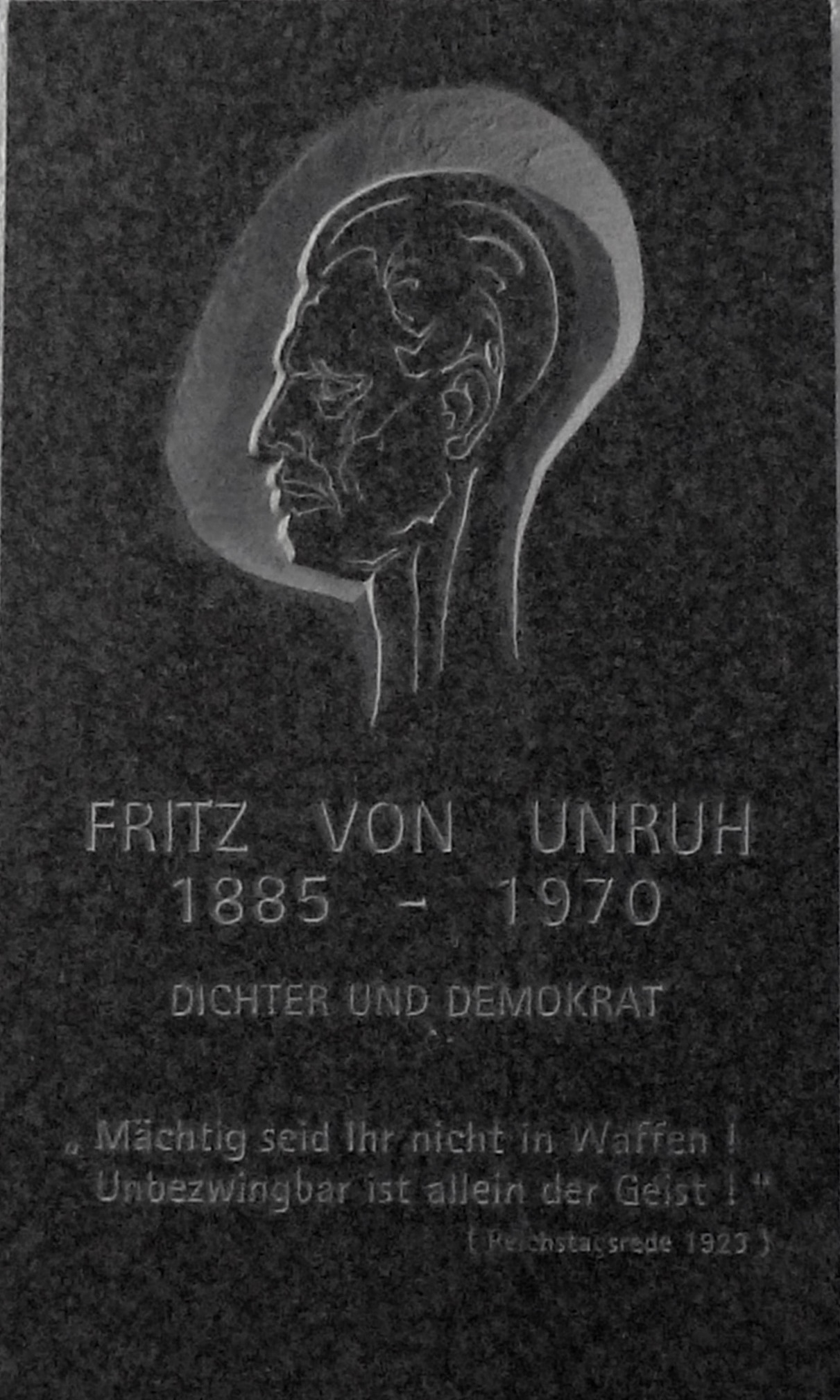
Memorial plate.

Fritz von Unruh (German: [ˈʊnʀuː]; 10 May 1885 – 28 November 1970) was a German expressionist dramatist, poet, and novelist.

== Biography ==
Unruh was born in Koblenz, Germany. A general's son, he was an officer in the German army until 1912, when he left to pursue his writing career. Two of his earliest important works, the play Offiziere ("Officers"; 1911) and the poem Vor der Entscheidung ("Before the Decision"; 1914) established his anti-war beliefs and his belief that the social order must be based not on authority, but on the integrity and responsibility of the individual towards humanity. Unruh's works were anti-militaristic and called for world peace and brotherhood. Some of his more notable works include Der Opfergang ("Way of Sacrifice"), a powerful anti-war piece written during the siege of Verdun and published in 1919, Ein Geschlecht ("A Family"; 1916) and its sequel Platz (1920), and Heinrich von Andernach (1925).

Unruh was a staunch opponent of the Nazi Party and wrote several works warning of the consequences of Nazi dictatorship, including Bonaparte (1927), Berlin in Monte Carlo (1931), and Zero (1932). He left Germany for France in 1932, later immigrating to the United States. He finally returned to Germany in 1962 and died in the town of Dietz at age 85.

== Honors and awards ==
- 1914 Kleist Prize for Louis Ferdinand Prinz von Preußen
- 1923 Grillparzer Prize
- 1947 Wilhelm Raabe Prize
- 1948 Goethe Prize of the City Frankfurt am Main
- 1955 Goethe Plaque of the City of Frankfurt
- 1966 Carl von Ossietzky Medal

== Works ==
=== Dramas ===
- Jürgen Wullenweber, 1908
- Offiziere, 1911
- Louis Ferdinand Prinz von Preußen, 1913
- Ein Geschlecht, Tragödie, 1917
- Platz, 1920 (Fortsetzung von Ein Geschlecht)
- Stürme, Schauspiel, 1922
- Rosengarten, 1923
- Bonaparte, Schauspiel, 1927
- Phaea, Komödie, 1930
- Zero, Komödie, 1932
- Gandha, 1935
- Charlotte Corday, 1936
- Miss Rollschuh, 1941
- Der Befreiungsminister, 1948
- Wilhelmus, 1953
- Duell an der Havel, Schauspiel, 1954
- Bismarck oder Warum steht der Soldat da?, 1955
- Odysseus auf Ogygia, Schauspiel, 1968

=== Novels ===
- Opfergang, 1918
- Der nie verlor, 1948
- Die Heilige, 1952
- Fürchtet nichts, 1952
- Der Sohn des Generals, 1957

=== Lectures ===
- " Vaterland und Freiheit. Eine Ansprache an die deutsche Jugend", 1923
- " Politeia", hrsg. von Ernst Adolf Dreyer, 1933
- " Europa erwache!", gehalten am Europa-Tag in Basel, 1936
- " Friede auf Erden! Peace o Earth!", Frankfurt/M., 1948
- " Rede an die Deutschen", Geleitwort von Eugen Kogon, 1948
- " Seid wachsam", Goethe-Rede, Frankfurt/M., 1948
- " Universitätsrede", in: Was da ist. Kunst und Literatur in Frankfurt/M., 1952
- " Schillerrede", hrsg. von der Fritz von Unruh-Gesellschaft, Gießen, 1955
- " Mächtig seid ihr nicht in Waffen", Begleitwort von Albert Einstein, 1957
- " Mahnruf zum Frieden", in: Konkret 7(1961), 1960
- " Wir wollen Frieden", Geleitwort von Hanns Martin Elster, 1961
- " Sport und Politik", Appell an die Jugend in aller Welt, 1961
- " Die Lebendigen rufe ich ", mit Beitrag von Johannes Urzidil, 1962
- " Rede an die Frankfurter Jugend", hrsg. vom DGB, Kreisausschuss Frankfurt/M., 1964

=== Collections ===
- Vor der Entscheidung, 1914
- Flügel der Nike. Buch einer Reise, 1925
- Meine Begegnungen mit Trotzki, 1963
- Friede in USA? Ein Traum, 1967
