= Goethe Prize =

German literary award

- Awarded for: Achievement worthy of honour in memory of Johann Wolfgang von Goethe
- Date: 1927
- Location: Frankfurt am Main
- Country: Germany
- Reward: €50,000, certificate written on parchment
- Website: goethe-preis

The Goethe Prize of the City of Frankfurt (German: Goethe-Preis der Stadt Frankfurt am Main) is an award for achievement "worthy of honour in memory of Johann Wolfgang von Goethe" made by the city of Frankfurt am Main, Germany. It was usually an annual award until 1955, and thereafter has been triennial. Following a decision of municipal authorities in 1952, the "Award of the Goethe Prize" only takes place every three years. Many recipients are authors, but persons working in several other creative and scientific fields have been honoured. The prize money is €50,000.

== Recipients ==
- 1927 – Stefan George, Germany
- 1928 – Albert Schweitzer, France
- 1929 – Leopold Ziegler, Germany
- 1930 – Sigmund Freud, Austria
- 1931 – Ricarda Huch, Germany
- 1932 – Gerhart Hauptmann, Germany
- 1933 – Hermann Stehr, Germany
- 1934 – Hans Pfitzner, Germany
- 1935 – Hermann Stegemann, Germany
- 1936 – Georg Kolbe, Germany
- 1937 – Erwin Guido Kolbenheyer, Germany
- 1938 – Hans Carossa, Germany
- 1939 – Carl Bosch, Germany
- 1940 – Agnes Miegel, Germany
- 1941 – Wilhelm Schäfer, Germany
- 1942 – Richard Kuhn, Germany
- 1945 – Max Planck, Germany
- 1946 – Hermann Hesse, Germany
- 1947 – Karl Jaspers, Germany
- 1948 – Fritz von Unruh, Germany
- 1949 – Thomas Mann, Germany
- 1952 – Carl Zuckmayer, Germany
- 1954 – Theodor Brugsch, Germany
- 1955 – Annette Kolb, Germany
- 1958 – Carl Friedrich von Weizsäcker, Germany
- 1960 – Ernst Beutler, Germany
- 1961 – Walter Gropius, Germany
- 1964 – Benno Reifenberg, Germany
- 1967 – Carlo Schmid, Germany
- 1970 – György Lukács, Hungary
- 1973 – Arno Schmidt, Germany
- 1976 – Ingmar Bergman, Sweden
- 1979 – Raymond Aron, France
- 1982 – Ernst Jünger, Germany
- 1985 – Golo Mann, Germany
- 1988 – Peter Stein, Germany
- 1991 – Wislawa Szymborska, Poland
- 1994 – Ernst Gombrich, United Kingdom
- 1997 – Hans Zender, Germany
- 1999 – Siegfried Lenz, Germany
- 2002 – Marcel Reich-Ranicki, Germany
- 2005 – Amos Oz, Israel
- 2008 – Pina Bausch, Germany
- 2011 – Adunis, Syria
- 2014 – Peter von Matt, Switzerland
- 2017 – Ariane Mnouchkine, France
- 2020 – Dževad Karahasan, Bosnia and Herzegovina
- 2023 – Barbara Honigmann, Germany
- 2026 – Uwe Timm, Germany

== See also ==
- German literature
- List of literary awards
- List of poetry awards
- List of years in literature
- List of years in poetry
- Hanseatic Goethe Prize
