= Styria Media Group =

Austrian media company

Styria Media Group AG
- Company type: Aktiengesellschaft
- Industry: Media, publishing
- Founded: Graz, Austria (1869)
- Founder: Alois Karlon
- Headquarters: Graz, Austria
- Area served: Austria, Croatia, Slovenia
- Revenue: €411 million (2022)
- Number of employees: ~3000 (2022)
- Website: styria.com

The Styria Media Group AG, often referred to as just Styria, is an Austrian media company founded in 1869 and based in Graz. The company is one of the largest media companies in Austria, Croatia and Slovenia. Styria publishes a number of daily papers and weekly magazines, several news websites, and operates two radio stations and a television channel. They also incorporate seven book publishing companies. The group generated a market turnover of 411 million euros in 2022.

As of 2015, the Styria Media Group and the Moser Holding Aktiengesellschaft each own 50% of Regionalmedien Austria. This company publishes free (advertiser-funded) local newspapers throughout Austria. The company's original markets are the Styria and Carinthia regions of Austria, where they publish their flagship daily Kleine Zeitung and a number of regional weeklies. On a national level, the company publishes Vienna-based daily Die Presse and the weekly magazine Die Furche.

In Croatia, Styria is the sole shareholder of the major daily newspaper Večernji list and the daily tabloid 24sata. In March 2008 they also acquired the business daily Poslovni dnevnik.

Around 2015 the company moved into the Styria Media Center in the Jakomini district of Graz.

== Publications ==
Newspapers

- Die Presse (Austria)
- Kleine Zeitung (Austria)
- 24sata (Croatia)
- Poslovni dnevnik (Croatia)
- Večernji list (Croatia)
- Die Furche (Austria)
