= Die Furche =

Die Furche is a weekly German language newspaper published in Vienna, Austria. The word Furche itself may be translated as furrow, with corresponding symbolic meaning.

== History and profile ==
Die Furche was established in 1945. The paper is published weekly. It is majority owned by Styria Medien AG. The paper has its headquarters in Vienna.

Die Furche bills itself as the "Wochenzeitung für Gesellschaft, Politik, Kultur, Religion und Wirtschaft" (Weekly newspaper for society, politics, culture, religion, and economy). It considers itself to be a quality newspaper characterized by a Christian world view with a clear commitment to tolerance and openness towards the world. The paper has a liberal Catholic leaning.
