= Erwin Guido Kolbenheyer =

Austrian writer (1878–1962)

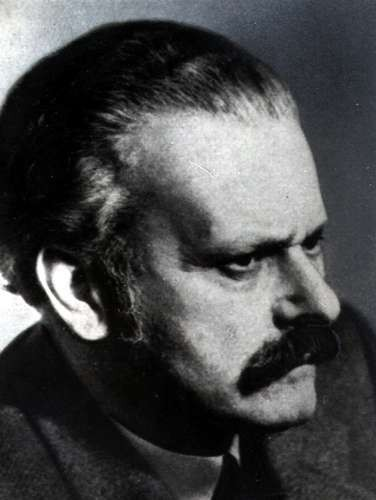

Erwin Guido Kolbenheyer (30 December 1878, in Budapest – 12 April 1962, in Munich) was an Austrian novelist, poet and playwright. Later based in Germany, he belonged to a group of writers that included the likes of Hans Grimm, Rudolf G. Binding, Emil Strauß, Agnes Miegel and Hanns Johst, all of whom found favour under the Nazis.

== Life and work ==
A Volksdeutscher from the Hungarian part of the Austro-Hungarian Empire, he attended school in Budapest before furthering his education in Karlsbad and Vienna. Kolbenheyer studied philosophy, psychology and zoology at the University of Vienna and earned his PhD in 1905. He became a freelance writer and came to specialise in historical novels that were characterised by their fixation with all things German. In 1908 he published Amor Dei, a novel about life and thinking of the Jewish-Dutch philosopher Baruch Spinoza, which made Kolbenheyer fairly known. Kolbenheyer published an anthology with own poetry under the title Der Dornbusch brennt (i.e. Burning bush) in 1922. Between 1917 and 1925 he produced his most celebrated works, a trilogy of novels about Paracelsus, and in these books Kolbenheyer explored many of the Völkisch movement concepts prevalent at the time by presenting his hero as the Nordic race archetype struggling against racial degeneracy and immorality. In 1929 he published „Heroische Leidenschaften“ (i.e. Heroic Passions), a drama about the Italian astronomer Giordano Bruno. Having settled amongst the Sudeten Germans, Kolbenheyer's right-wing attitudes solidified and he came to pre-empt many ideas of Nazism, notably in his theoretical work Die Bauhütte (1925), which predicted a turn away from 'Judeo-Christianity' as the source of German salvation. This work has been identified as being one of the main influences on Alfred Rosenberg's The Myth of the Twentieth Century. In Kolbenheyer's own words the addressee of his book "Bauhütte" is the "philosophical conscience ... of the white race" which he wanted to arouse. A strong opponent of left-wing politics, he joined Wilhelm Schäfer in resigning from the Akademie der Künste in 1931 over what he saw as their support for the activities of Heinrich Mann and Alfred Döblin.

== Nazism ==
He continued to write widely under the Nazis, taking up his pen to praise Adolf Hitler in a poem and to defend the Nazi book burnings, as well as to write pro-Nazi war novels such as Karlsbader Novellen 1786 (1935) and Das Gottgelobte Herz (1938). The Gottgelobte Herz (i.e. The God-blessed heart) is a novel about the Dominican nun Margareta Ebner. Indeed, his star rose under the Nazis because his literature fitted their world view. He was one of a number of writers added to the Prussian Academy of Arts after the Nazis came to power in 1933 at the expense of the likes of Franz Werfel, Ludwig Fulda, and Jakob Wassermann, none of whom shared the Nazi Weltanschauung.

His 1934 play Gregor und Heinrich, concerning Henry IV, Holy Roman Emperor and Pope Gregory VII, demonstrated an instance of his pro-Nazi stance as he dedicated it to "the German spirit in the process of being resurrected". As a reward for his high standing under the Nazis he was one of six writers included on 'List A' or the 'List of the God-gifted', properly known as the Gottbegnadeten list, who were exempted from military service on account of their prestige. He was also awarded the Goethe Prize in 1937. In 1940 he published the anthology Vox humana and became a member of the Nazi party.

== Post-war writing ==
Kolbenheyer was banned from writing for five years after the Second World War although from his base in West Germany he continued to publish novels that were largely in the same nationalist spirit as his previous output. He also became a regular contributor to the far right, pan-European nationalist journal Nation Europa.

== Quotation ==
In Kolbenheyer's drama Menschen und Götter (i.e. Men and Gods), Orbis, Prague, 1944:

SON OF MAN
Go further monk, and heal
your excessive pain through my pain.
It flows to you as a part of yourself
out of the infiniteness.
Lo, the drops descend,
drops of blood out of heart and hand.
You shall humbly drink
the salvation by sacrifice, sent by God.

Preceded by Georg Kolbe	Recipient of the Goethe Prize; 1937	Succeeded by Hans Carossa
