= Josephine Fröhlich =

Austrian opera singer

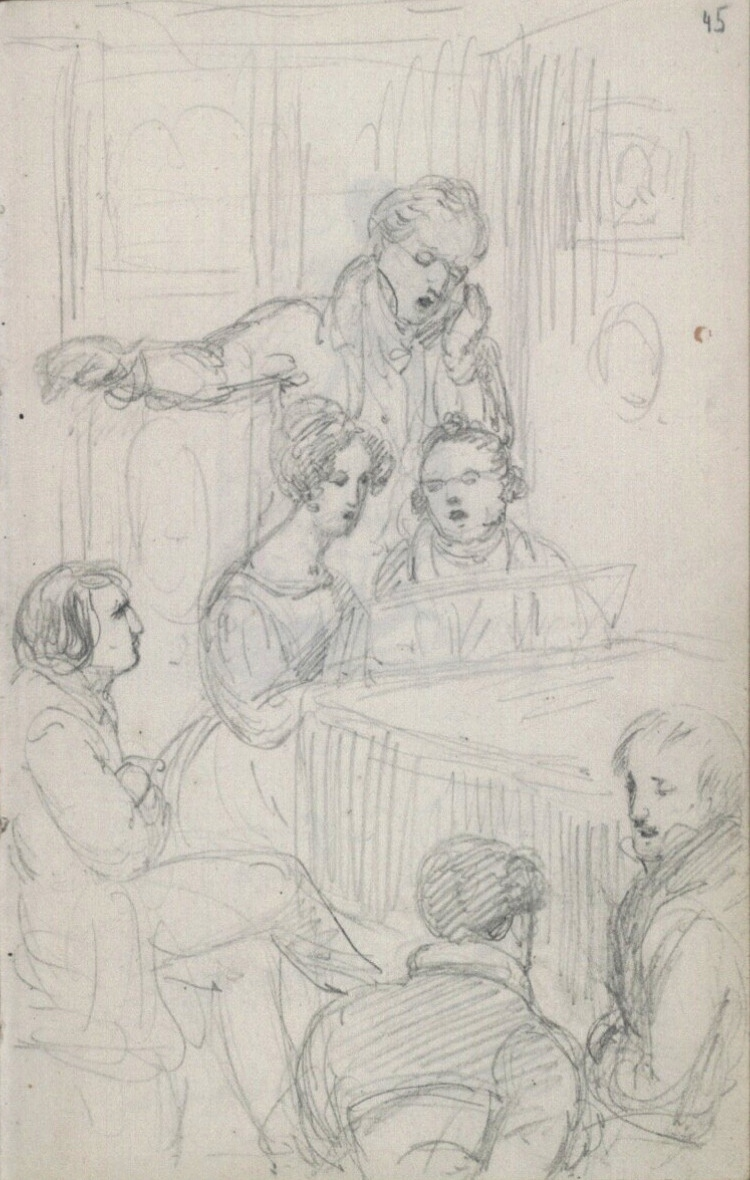
Johann Michael Vogl, Josephine Fröhlich and Franz Schubert.

Josephine "Pepi" Fröhlich (12 December 1803 in Vienna – 7 May 1878 in Vienna) was an Austrian opera singer (alto).

== Family ==
Josephine Fröhlich had three sisters, Anna Fröhlich (1793–1880), Barbara Fröhlich (1797–1879), and pianist Katharina Fröhlich (1800–1879). Their household was a prominent place for musical activity within Vienna. Franz Schubert was a good friend of the family, and a frequent guest at music gatherings at their home, where he often performed his own compositions or improvised on the piano. At Anna's request, he wrote a few compositions for Anna, Josephine and Anna's students. Schubert wrote the solo part in two of his major compositions for Josephine's voice. The poet Franz Grillparzer, who also was a family friend, wrote the lyrics to the compositions. The two works are Zögernd Leise D 921 (1827) and the cantata Miriam Siegesgesang D 942 (1828).

== Career ==
Fröhlich studied in the years 1819–21 and sang with the Society of Music Friends in Vienna with her sister, Anna Frölich (1793–1880). She made her operatic debut in Mozart's opera Die Entführung aus dem Serail in 1821. After her debut in Vienna she went on tour in Scandinavia. In Denmark was awarded the title of the Kongelige Kammersangere (Royal Opera singer) of Frederik VI. After touring in Prague in 1826 and Milan in 1830, she permanently settled down in Vienna, where she became private vocal teacher.

She also composed at least two pieces for voice and piano: "Alla luna" and "Erinnerungen".
