= Annette Kolb =

German author and pacifist

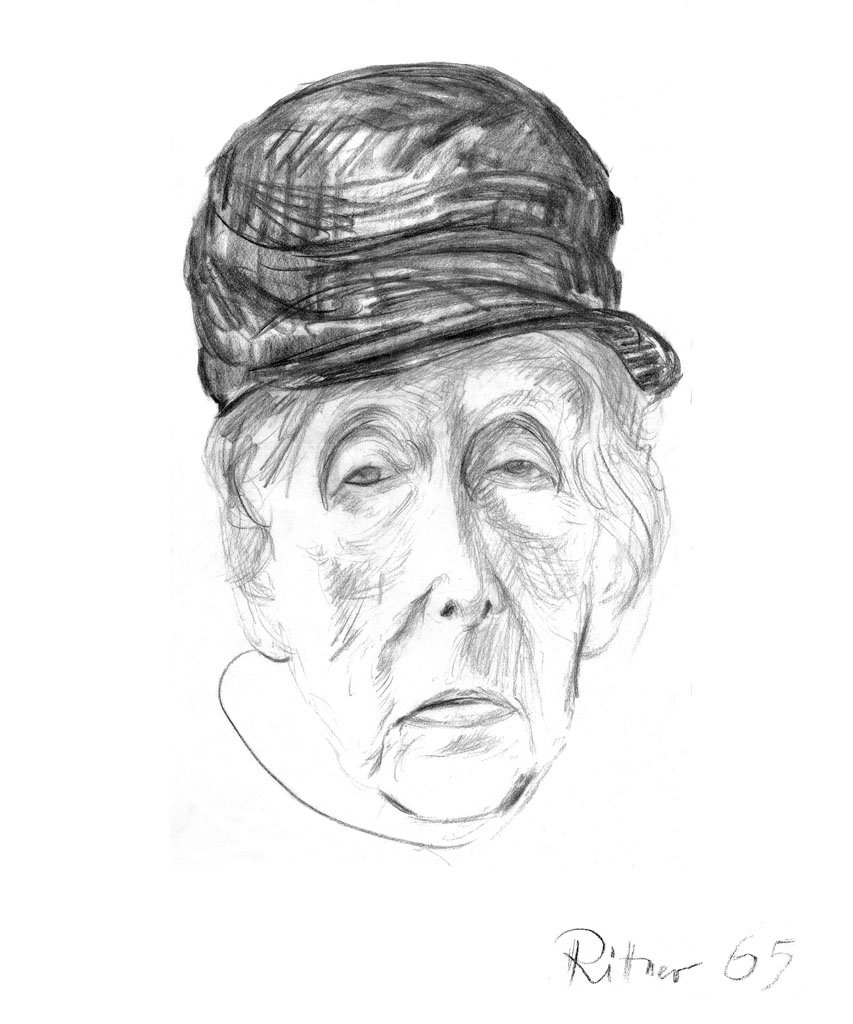
Annette Kolb

Annette Kolb (pseudonym of Anna Mathilde Kolb) was an author, journalist, emigrée and pacifist.

== Life ==
Kolb was born on 3 February 1870 in Munich, the daughter of a French pianist mother and a German landscape architect father. She was an author, emigré, and pacifist.

She became active in pacifist causes during World War I and this caused her political difficulties from then on. Kolb was in contact with other pacifists and war opponents, such as Berta Zuckerkandl, whom she met in 1917 in Switzerland. She left Germany in February 1933, immediately after Hitler's seizing of power for France, later the USA. She returned in 1945 after the war. Her works were banned during the Third Reich. She wrote novels on social issues, the three novels between 1914 and 1934 (see Works) are considered her main oeuvre, and in later life also nonfiction. In 1955 she won the Goethe Prize. She died on 3 December 1967 in Munich.

== Works ==
- Das Exemplar. A novel. Berlin, S. Fischer, 1913.
- Daphne Herbst. A novel. Berlin, S. Fischer, 1927.
- Die Schaukel. A novel. Berlin, S. Fischer, 1934.
- Mozart. Chicago: Henry Rednery Company, 1956.

== See also ==
- Exilliteratur
- List of peace activists
