= Rudolf Bayr =

Austrian writer, critic and translator

Rudolf Bayr (1919–1990) was an Austrian dramatist, lyricist, essayist, critic and translator.

== Biography ==
Bayr was born on 22 May 1919 in Linz, Upper Austria. Bayr was cultural editor of the Volkischer Beobachter at a young age but later had a considerable career in the media of the Second Republic. Despite this burdensome past after 1945 he wrote, among others, for the Salzburger Nachrichten, worked as a lecturer and author at the Residenz Verlag, and worked from 1975 to 1984 as Intendant of the ORF regional studios Salzburg. Bayr was friends with Karl Heinrich Waggerl and actively supported the initiator of the 1970 Rauriser Literature Days, Erwin Gimmelsberger. Many of Bayr's works deal with the presentation of ancient themes.

In 1956, he won the Laureate of the Academy of Sciences Franz Grillparzer Prize.

Bayr has also emerged as a chef and restaurant critique. From 1970 until his death in 1985, he was a member of the Lodge Tamino. He died on 17 October 1990 in Salzburg.

== Radio plays ==
- 1955: Agamemnon must die - Director: Hans Conrad Fischer (radio play - SFB )
- 1965: Orange Blossom - Director: Gert Westphal (Radio Play - NDR )

== Literature ==
Peter Kraft: Ancient antiquity taken at its word. About Rudolf Bayr, the originating from Linz and emerged from the Academic Gymnasium humanist, in Academic Gymnasium Linz, Alumni Report No. 31, Linz, 2001, pp. 1–5
