= Wilhelm Schäfer =

German writer (1868–1952)

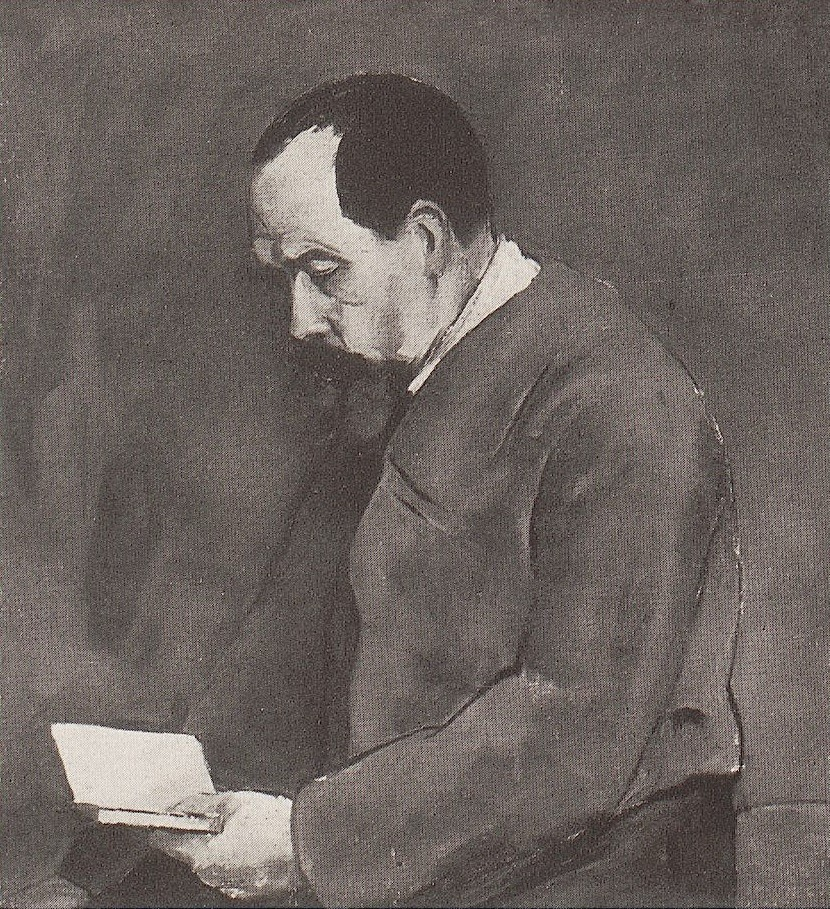
Wilhelm Schäfer, by Heinrich Altherr (c.1930)

Wilhelm Schäfer (20 January 1868 – 19 January 1952) was a German writer.

== Life ==
Born in Ottrau (Hesse), until 1896 Schäfer was a school teacher. He gained a scholarship to study in Switzerland and France through the Cotta-Verlag publishing house, and in 1898 became a freelance writer in Berlin. He lived in Vallendar from 1900 to 1915, and from 1918 until his death in 1952, he lived in Bodman on the Bodensee.

His work (drama, novels, and short prose pieces) were naturalist in style and marked with "völkisch" and national elements. In 1930 he published a novel about the shoe-maker Wilhelm Voigt with the title Der Hauptmann von Köpenick.

From 1900 to 1920, he published the magazine Die Rheinlande. His early work was especially influenced by naturalism. Important novellas were "Die unterbrochene Rheinfahrt" (1913) und "Hölderlins Einkehr" (1925). Schäfer's folksy language and mystification of the "German soul" made his work popular with the Nazis.

== Awards ==
- 1941 Goethepreis der Stadt Frankfurt
- 1948 Honorary citizen of Bodman

== Works (selection) ==
- Die zehn Gebote. Erzählungen des Kanzelfriedrich, 1897
- Rheinsagen, 1908
- Karl Stauffers Lebensgang. Eine Chronik der Leidenschaft, 1912
- Das fremde Fräulein (Novelle über den Tod der Idilia Dubb auf Burg Lahneck)
- Die dreizehn Bücher der deutschen Seele, 1922
- Winckelmanns Ende, 1925
- Der Hauptmann von Köpenick, 1930
- Mein Leben, 1934
- Theoderich, König des Abendlandes, 1939
- Lebenstag eines Menschenfreundes (Ein Pestalozzi Roman), 1915
