= Jakob Julius David =

Austrian writer (1859–1906)

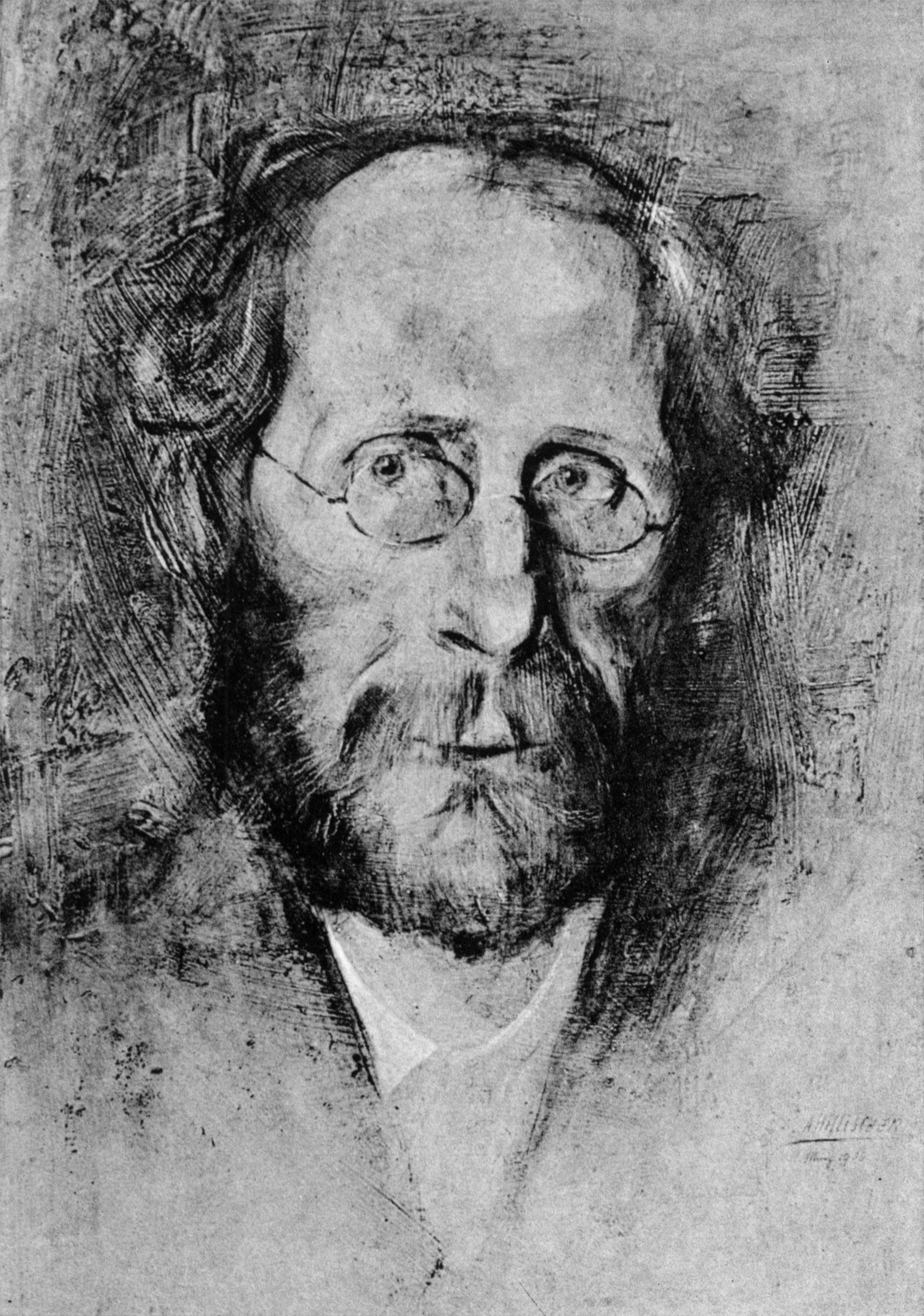
1908 portrait of Jakob Julius David by A. Hillischer

Jakob Julius David (6 February 1859 – 20 November 1906) was an Austrian novelist and journalist, born in Hranice.

== Life ==
Jakob Julius David was born in Habsburg Moravia, the son of a wealthy German-Jewish farmer. The family soon moved to Fulnek, where his father died. David attended high schools in Kroměříž and Opava. In 1873, he fell ill with severe typhus, which limited his vision and hearing. Despite this, he began to study German literature and history in Vienna in 1877, and took an active interest in student life in the capital.

Because he could not become a teacher due to his disabilities, he worked as a tutor and then as an editor and journalist, including for the Wiener Mode, Die Zeit, the Mondaysrevue, the Wiener Allgemeine Zeitung, the Neue Wiener Journal and the Wiener Zeitung. He was also a freelance writer.

In 1889 he obtained his promotion to Doctor of Philosophy. He converted from Judaism to Catholicism, but remained in close contact with Jewish personalities and continued to write for Jewish publications, such as the Austrian Weekly. In 1891, David married Julie Ostruska, with whom he had a daughter. In 1899 he made an extended trip to Italy. Jakob Julius David joined the Masonic Lodge Zukunft, writing reviews for its magazine Zirkel.

He was diagnosed with bronchial cancer in 1905 and died in 1906 in Vienna. He is buried in a memorial grave in the Vienna Central Cemetery.

== Literary work ==
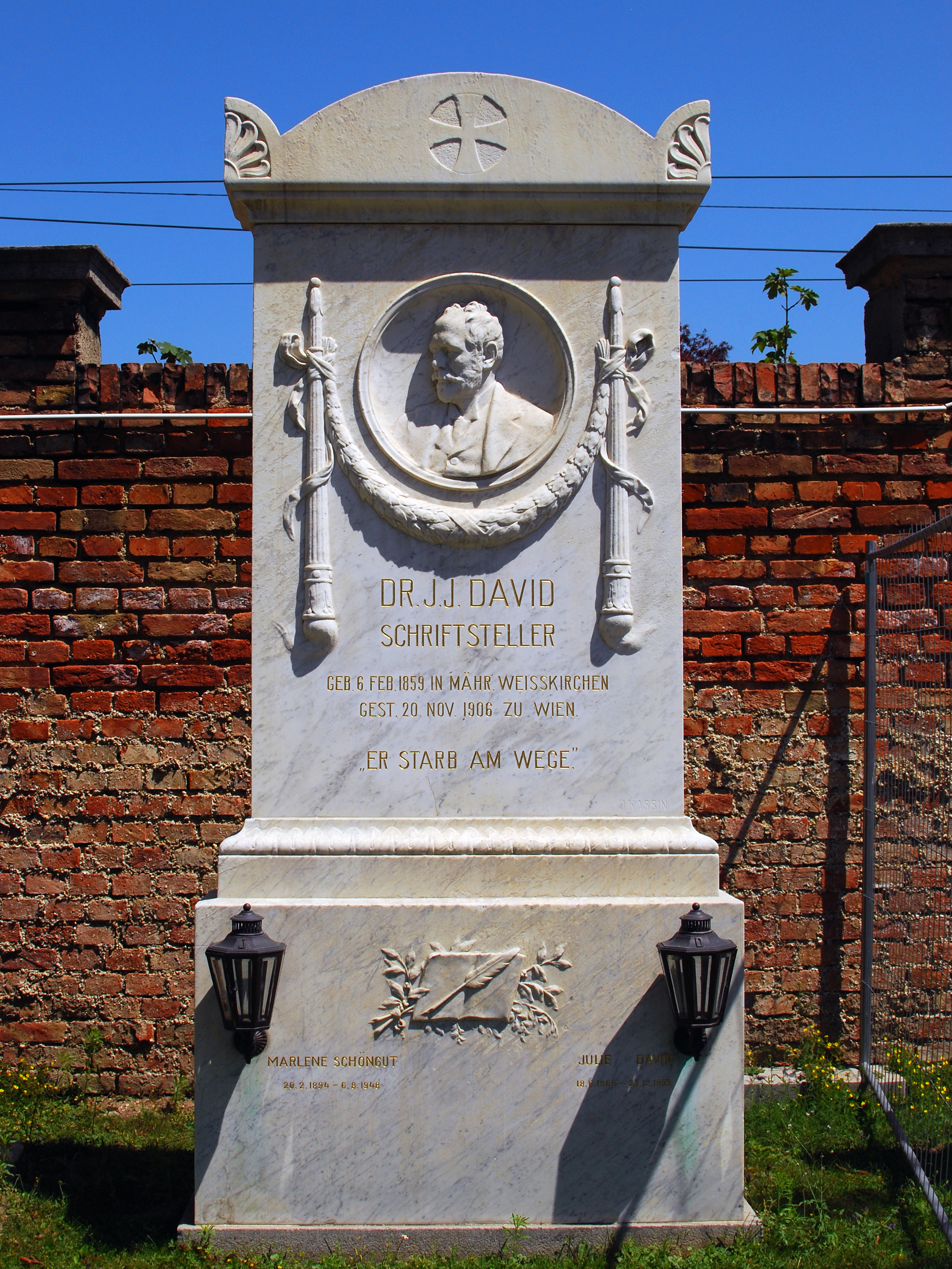
Jakob David's tomb

His literary output includes poems, films, tales and drama, where his best and most lasting work is undoubtedly the stories. His early work reflects the influence of Conrad Ferdinand Meyer. Many of his novels and short stories deal with his Moravian home or are in the milieu of middle-class Vienna. Stylistically, David has been assigned to many different categories, such as naturalism, literary decadence, or Austrian realism. He is one of Austria's lesser known writers, but his stories have been published many times in the last few decades.

== Publications ==
=== Collected works ===
- Gesammelte Werke in sieben Bänden. München and Leipzig, 1908–1909

=== Poems ===
- Gedichte. Dresden 1892

=== Novels ===
- Das Blut, Dresden (no year)
- Am Wege sterben, Berlin 1900
- Der Übergang, Berlin 1903

=== Stories ===
- Das Höfe-Recht. Dresden 1890
- Die Wiedergeborenen. Dresden and Leipzig 1891
- Probleme. Dresden and Leipzig 1892
- Frühschein. Geschichten vom Ausgang des großen Krieges. Leipzig 1896
- Vier Geschichten. Leipzig and Berlin 1897
- Die Troika. Leipzig and Berlin 1901
- Die Hanna. Tales from Moravia. Berlin and Leipzig 1904
- Halluzinationen. in Neue Deutsche Rundschau XVII 1906
- Wunderliche Heilige. Wien 1906

=== Plays ===
- Hagars Sohn. Wien 1891
- Ein Regentag. Leipzig 1896
- Neigung. Leipzig 1898
- Der getreue Eckardt. Leipzig 1902

=== Essays ===
- Mitterwurzer. Berlin 1905
- Vom Schaffen. Jena 1906
- Essays. München 1909
