= Marie Eugenie Delle Grazie =

Austrian writer (1864–1931)

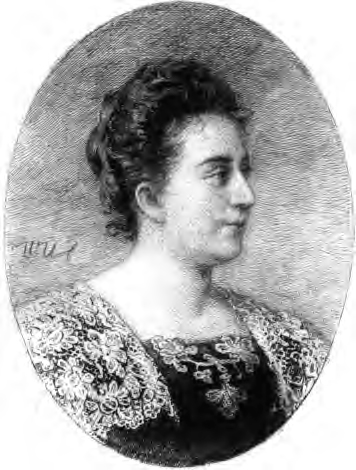
- Born: 14 August 1864; Weißkirchen, Austrian Empire
- Died: 18 February 1931 (aged 66); Vienna, Austria
- Writing career
- Genres: poetry, novel, play

Marie Eugenie Delle Grazie (14 August 1864 – 18 February 1931) was an Austrian writer, considered one of the most successful women writers of her time. She was a recipient of the Bauernfeld Prize.

== Life ==
The daughter of Cäsar Delle Grazie, inspector general for Erste Donaudampfschiffahrtsgesellschaft and director for a coal mining company, she was born in Weißkirchen in Hungary. After the death of her father in 1873, the family moved to Vienna. She was educated at a girls' school and then attended one year at Sankt Anna, a teachers college. She continued her education with Laurenz Müllner, a professor of Christian philosophy at the University of Vienna.

Delle Grazie wrote poetry from an early age, publishing her first collection Gedichte in 1882. Robespierre. Ein moderners Epos, an epic poem in iambic pentameter published in 1894, is considered one of her best works. In 1916, she received the Ebner-Eschenbach-Preis.

In 1910, following the publication of a book which denounced emancipation for women, she published two articles in the newspaper Neue Freie Presse expressing support for women's rights.

She died in Vienna at the age of 66.

== Selected works ==
- Hermann, epic poem (1883)
- Die Zigeunerin, story (1885)
- Italienische Vignetten, poetry (1892)
- Moralische Walpurgisnacht, play (1896)
- Schlagende Wetter, play (1900)
- Der Schatten, play (1902), performed at the Burgtheater, was awarded the Bauernfeld Prize
- Ver Sacrum, play (1906), received the prize of the Volkstheater in Vienna
- Heilige und Menschen, novel (1907)
- Vor dem Sturm, novel (1910)
- O Jugend!, novel (1917)
- Donaukind, autobiographical novel (1918)
- Eines Lebens Sterne, autobiographical novel (1919)
- Die weißen Schmetterlinge von Clairvaux, novella (1925)
- Unsichtbare Straße, novel (1927)
