= Max Mell =

Austrian writer

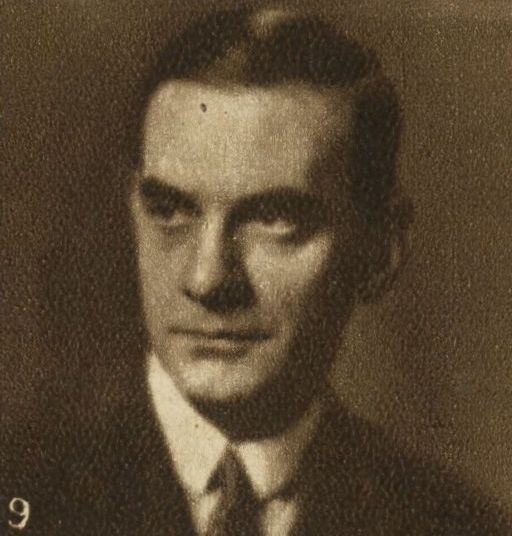
- Born: 10 November 1882; Maribor, Austro-Hungarian Empire
- Died: 12 December 1971 (aged 88); Vienna, Austria
- Occupation: Writer

Max Mell (1882–1971) was an Austrian writer. He wrote plays, novels and screenplays. He was born in Maribor, then part of the Austrian Empire but now in Slovenia. He studied at Vienna University, and served in the Austrian military during World War I. In 1914 he won the Bauernfeld Prize, and in 1929 he was awarded the Franz Grillparzer Prize. Culturally conservative, in 1951 he tried to counter what he regarded as Nazi distortions of the epic Nibelungenlied with a more faithful reading of the original text. In 1959 he was given the Austrian Decoration for Science and Art.

== Bibliography ==
- Winder McConnell. A Companion to the Nibelungenlied. Camden House, 1998.
