= Richard Beer-Hofmann =

Austrian dramatist and poet (1866–1945)

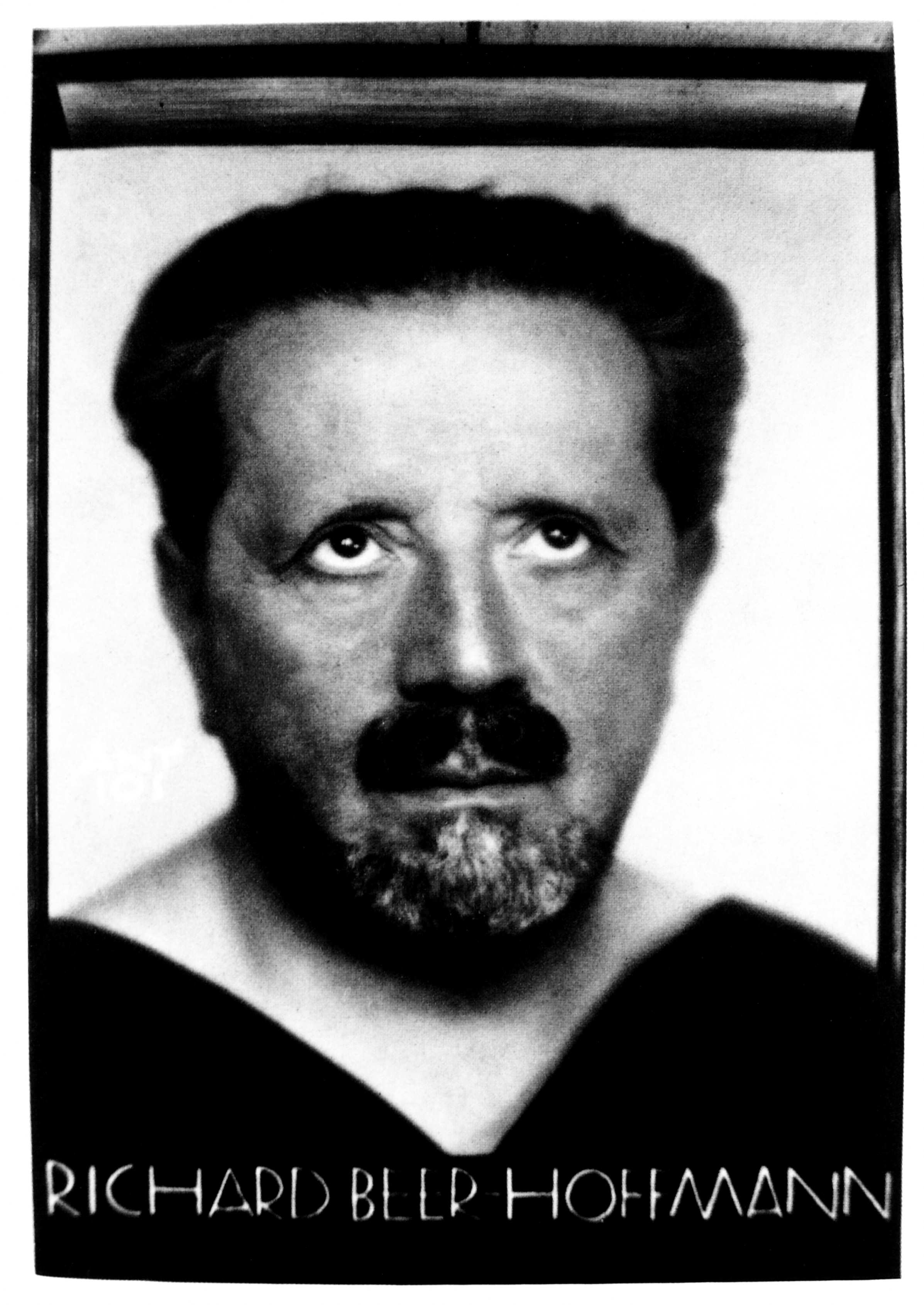

Richard Beer-Hofmann (11 July 1866 – 26 September 1945) was an Austrian dramatist and poet.

== Life and career ==
Richard Beer was born on 11 July 1866 in Vienna to Jewish parents. His mother died of childbed fever within a week of his birth and after her death he was reared by his aunt and uncle, Bertha and Alois Hofmann, and adopted in 1884 taking on the name Beer-Hofmann. He spent his early childhood in Brno, Moravia, where Alois Hofmann owned a textile factory. In 1880 the family moved to Vienna and Richard finished his schooling at the Akademisches Gymnasium. In the 1880s he studied law in Vienna, receiving his doctorate in 1890. In the year of his graduation he became acquainted with the writers Hugo von Hofmannsthal, Hermann Bahr and Arthur Schnitzler, with whom he shared a long friendship and membership in the Jung-Wien literary movement. He consequently began his literary activities as a freelance writer.

Beer-Hofmann married Paula Lissy in 1897. Their daughter Miriam Beer-Hofmann Lens was born the same year, sister Naema in 1898, brother Gabriel in 1891.

At first Beer-Hofmann wrote novellas, later moving on to short stories and poetry. In the 1920s he worked as a theatre director for Max Reinhardt, a role which continued until 1932. In 1939 Beer-Hofmann emigrated from Austria, and traveled to New York via Zürich. His wife, Paula, died in Switzerland. Subsequently, his works were banned in Austria and Germany. In 1945 he became a United States citizen, but died that same year on 26 September in New York City.

Beer-Hofmann's literary output consists primarily of novellas, dramas, and poems. It can be considered part of the literary current of the Wiener Moderne. Beer-Hofmann received several notable literary awards, including the Volksschillerpreis in 1905 in Germany and the award of the National Institute of Arts and Letters in 1945 in the United States. One year after his death the Beer-Hofmann Society was created in New York.

Richard Beer-Hofmann's as well as his daughter's papers can be found in the Leo Baeck Institute Archives. In addition to the Richard Beer-Hofmann Collection (AR 745) and the Miriam Beer-Hofmann Lens Collection (AR 7258), there is a research collection (AR 25593) of the literary historian Richard M. Sheirich's papers at the Leo Baeck Archive. Sheirich's collection sheds light on Beer-Hofmann's preparation for discussing Jewish topics in his works as well as his daughter's efforts to preserve her father's modern literary memory.

== Works ==
- Novellen
- Der Tod Georgs
- Der Graf von Charolais
- Gedenkrede auf Wolfgang Amadée Mozart
- Trilogy “Die Historie von König David” (uncompleted)
  - Jakobs Traum
  - Der junge David
- Paula. Ein Fragment
- Verse
- Schlaflied für Mirjam

== See also ==
- The Holocaust in Austria
- Vugesta
- List of claims for restitution for Nazi-looted art
