= Oberösterreichische Rundschau =

Oberösterreichische Rundschau is a weekly newspaper in Upper Austria, published in 17 regional editions.

== History ==
Oberösterreichische Rundschau evolved as a merger of several regional papers, the oldest of which, the Innviertler Volkszeitung, existed already in 1880. It has been published under the name Oberösterreichische Rundschau since 1983. The paper is published weekly.
