= Hans Carossa =

German novelist and poet (1878–1956)

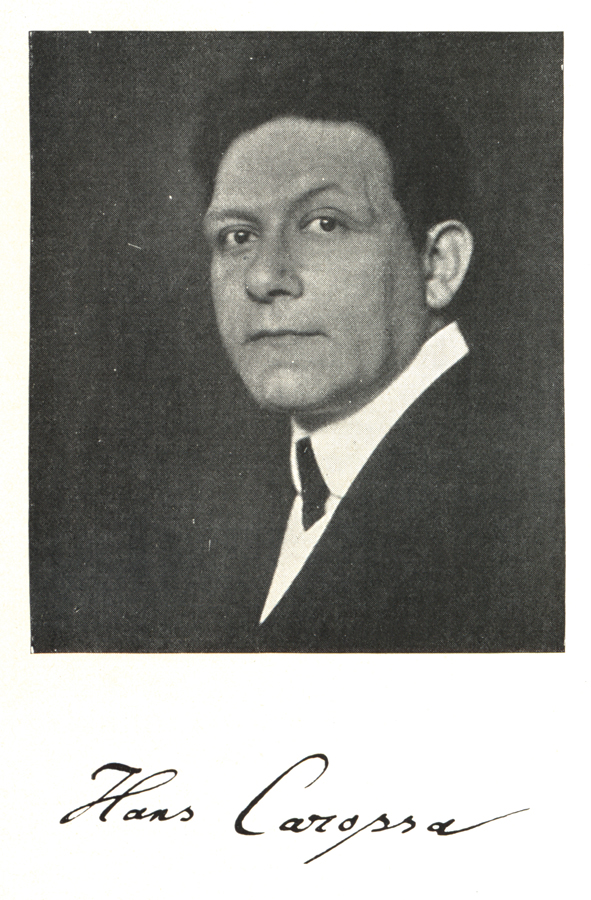
- Born: December 15, 1878; Bad Tölz, Kingdom of Bavaria (modern Germany)
- Died: September 12, 1956 (aged 77); Rittsteig (Passau), West Germany (modern Germany)
- Occupations: Novelist, poet, medical doctor

Hans Carossa (15 December 1878 – 12 September 1956) was a German novelist, poet, and medical doctor, known mostly for his autobiographical novels, and his inner emigration during the Nazi era.

He studied medicine, working as a field surgeon from 1916 to 1918. He was awarded the Swiss Gottfried Keller Prize in 1931, and the Goethe Prize in 1938.

== Biography ==
=== Carossa family ===
The Carossas were originally of North Italian stock; however, by 1878, when Hans was born, they no longer spoke Italian and were considered simply Upper Bavarian Germans. Hans' father, Karl Carossa, was a well-known lung specialist, who had published some significant research in his field. He had a calm humanitarian outlook, which endeared him to the local Catholic population in spite of his cool relationship with the Church. Carossa explains in the first volume of his autobiography, Eine Kindheit (A Childhood):

My father was the only man in the parish who rarely went to church and did not like to take off his hat in front of a cross. But the manner in which he treated his patients was so selfless and entirely attentive to their ailment, so ingenious and successful, that in spite of this he was regarded everywhere as a God-fearing man.

Carossa's mother, on the other hand, was a devoutly Catholic and quite sensitive person. The young couple had just settled in the south Bavarian resort town of Bad Tölz when Hans was born, and then lived in several Bavarian hamlets. These moves left a feeling of insecurity in the mind of their sensitive and introspective son. Although Hans had a younger sister, Stephanie, a close relationship with her is not evident. He attended the Volksschule in Pilsting and then Gymnasium in Landshut. After receiving his Abitur in 1897, he studied medicine at three universities: the Ludwig-Maximilians-Universität München, the University of Würzburg, and finally at Leipzig University, where he graduated in 1903.

Hans' interest in poetry began when he was quite young, but it was soon rivaled by the family tradition of medicine. The disparity between the impractical, otherworldly realm of the poet and the very down-to-earth life of a medical doctor haunted him for most of his life; practically all of his spare time during his university studies was spent in literary circles. Just after the turn of the century, the 24-year-old Carossa began medical practice in the south-east Bavarian border city of Passau. In 1907, the successful young doctor married a patient, Valerie Endlicher, and moved to the country.

=== Early career ===
Hans Carossa's first published work, the poem Stella Mystica, appeared in 1907. The poem, which is faintly reminiscent of a thirteenth century Tagelied, contains a classic theme which continues throughout the rest of Carossa's writings: unshakable faith in the ultimate victory of the powers of light over darkness. As might be expected of a first publication, however, the poem lacks the polish and maturity so typical of the poet's later work.

The year 1907 was a crucial one for a young Roman Catholic who longed to become a writer, especially one whose idols had been poets such as Richard Dehmel and Frank Wedekind; for it was in 1907 that Pope Pius X issued the encyclical Pascendi dominici gregis, bitterly condemning modernism in the arts. As with later more serious threats to his freedom of expression, Carossa was not deeply moved by this order from his church. Other literary and political figures fought the encyclical vigorously; Carossa neither complied nor complained.

It is evident from the correspondence between Carossa and Hugo von Hofmannsthal of the period that in the following year, 1908, Carossa all but quit medicine in favor of writing. The literary career of young doctor Carossa began three years later with a little 48-page collection of poems, simply titled Gedichte ("Poems"). The publication of this book also marked the inauguration of Carossa's lifelong association with the Insel publishing house. The problem of the relationship between the doctor and his patient, especially the moribund patient, tore at the soul of the youthful physician. It was natural that Carossa should attempt, as his literary idol Goethe had done in The Sorrows of Young Werther, to write his way out of his most perplexing problems. In fact, Carossa's Doktor Bürgers Ende of 1913 had too much in common with Werther, not only in its motivation, but also in form and plot, to be an original artistic creation. It represents, rather the culmination of the author's period of imitation which had started with the apery of contemporary modernists, and worked backwards in time, until, in copying Goethe, Carossa discovered himself. A guiding thought or Leitwort for Carossa splendidly epitomized his patient-doctor relationship, in ideas borrowed from his father: Ja, meinem Herzen am nächsten sind jetzt die Verlorenen, die, von denen ich weiss, dass ich sie nicht retten werde.

In the years just before World War I, literary interests were the chief concern in the young doctor's life. He took notes, planned works, and sought companionship and criticism of such literary figures as Rainer Maria Rilke and Hofmannstahl.

=== World War I ===
In 1914 Carossa, who was a little too old to be called up immediately, volunteered as an army physician. During the inevitable waiting so common to all military service, Carossa collected childhood memories into what was to become Eine Kindheit, kept a record of his war experiences later published as Rumänisches Tagebuch, and also made notes which served as the basis for a large section of his Lebensgedankenbuch titled Führung und Geleit. Carossa served as battalion medical officer on both fronts: first a short period in France, then an extended stay in the southeastern theater (Rumänisches Tagebuch), where his unit was involved in the Second Battle of Oituz. In 1918 Carossa's unit was transferred back to northern France where he suffered a shoulder wound which ended his military career.

=== Weimar Republic ===
The gay and lively Munich which Carossa had remembered from before the war greeted the convalescent veteran with somber, black-veiled women, limping men, and empty store windows. This was no time for poets of limited ability, as Carossa considered himself. At the time he felt earnestly: In den Jahren der Prüfung und Erniedrigung, wenn das Volk trauernd zur Erde schaut, wird ihm der Dichter stets am allernächsten sein. But his own destiny was to be primarily that of a doctor.

Ich werde wieder an Krankenbetten sitzen, über fremde Leiden Buch führen, Diagnosen und Prognosen stellen, Heilmittel verordnen, Zeugnisse verfassen, öfters Nachts gerufen werden, und von Zeit zu Zeit eine Urlaubsreise antreten und hie und da einmal ein paar Verse oder eine Seite Prosa schreiben ... Dem ärztlichen Wesen wollte ich verbunden bleiben und falls ich etwas schriebe, mit der Sprache kaum anders umgehen als mit den Heilgiften, auf deren genaue Dosierung ich eingeübt war. He considered it a good omen that while purchasing new medical instruments during his convalescence in Munich, he met Rilke who then turned out to be the first patient of his renewed practice. Upon his own recovery he returned to his Passau office. With renewed dedication, he read medical journals and went to lectures at the clinic to improve his abilities. The Passau practice grew and kept him quite busy. Nevertheless, in a later addition to his autobiographies, published posthumously, he concedes that when he moved to Munich, not long after reestablishing his Passau practice he fully intended to give up medicine for the life of a 'freier Schriftsteller': a wish which could not then become reality. Doctor Carossa did however, find a little time for the "Heilgifte" of literature. In 1922, the author of Doktor Bürger, which had been so glaringly modelled on Goethe's Werther, published the first volume of his autobiography, Eine Kindheit. The relationship between Carossa's four part autobiography (Eine Kindheit, Verwandlung einer Jugend, Das Jahr der schönen Täuschungen, and Der Tag des jungen Arztes) and Goethe's Dichtung und Wahrheit is much more subtle than that between Werther and Doktor Bürger. Doctor Carossa had already by this time published three other works: Stella Mystica, Gedichte, and a fifteen-page lyrical pamphlet titled Ostern. The success of Eine Kindheit rekindled Doctor Carossa's enthusiasm. Again, as in 1908, a completely literary career hung temptingly before his eyes. His writings were as yet producing only a meager income, but each new word of praise by friends and critics made the switch in emphasis from a career as doctor-poet to one of poet-doctor a little more feasible. In 1923 he published a third edition of Gedichte, now twice as large as the original 1910 edition. Further heartened by the response to his newer poems, Carossa released later in the same year his third prose work, Rumänisches Tagebuch. This book was very well received and was remunerative enough that in the mid-twenties Carossa was relieved of financial dependence on his medical practice. The most obvious sign of Carossa's financial success and definite turn toward literature was his ability to fulfill his desire for a Goethean pilgrimage to classic Italy. Such a pilgrimage had meant much to Goethe' s classical development and could have perhaps done the same for Carossa, but Carossa had had to wait too long for his "Italienische Reise". The world of 1925 was being shaken by ominous political happenings which were soon to bar any possibility of Carossa's accomplishing the degree of classic detachment that Goethe had been able to enjoy. In 1922, three years before Carossa's Italian trip, Italy had become the second totalitarian state of Europe. It called itself Fascist, while the first had designated itself Communist; but in terms of freedom of expression for an individual citizen, Communism and Fascism were synonymous. Germany, at the time, was still a democratic republic, but already in 1924, a little-known party with the catch-all name of National Socialist German Workers' Party had won 6.5% of the votes in the Reichstag election. Classically oriented Carossa did not seem to be at all impressed by these events. By leaving his Munich practice for Italy, he made a major break with the medical profession; when he returned only old friends, those he wanted to treat, would visit his office, and he could spend most of his days at literary composition. Soon after coming back from the classic land, he published the second of his autobiographical series, Verwandlung einer Jugend (1926). This same year also brought sadness into Carossa's life when on 29 December his dear friend Rilke died. Autobiographical material from Carossa dealing with the period from the mid-twenties to the early thirties is scant; and, since Carossa's own writings are to an excessive degree the only source of information about the man, very little is known about those years. Letters to his wife's family indicate that he was very concerned with his wife's illness, which resulted in her dependency on morphine. During the 1920s he began a relationship with his later second wife, Hedwig Kerber, with a child born in 1930. The lack of literary production may indicate that problems of the German economy, primarily the disastrous inflation, had made it necessary for Carossa to return to practice. He did rework Doktor Bürger and republished it in 1929 as Schicksal Doktor Bürgers, and one year earlier his home city of Munich had honored him with its Dichterpreis. Perhaps these years of relative silence were filled with preparation for the two fine works in the offing, the first of which was to appear in 1931.

On 25 May 1931 Thomas Mann's son Klaus Mann first considered emigrating from his native land because of the political situation. Two years later, he, the rest of the Mann family, and many others of Germany's finest minds did go into exile. In 1931 Carossa, outwardly at least, undisturbed by the "gathering storm" published Der Arzt Gion. Although still strongly autobiographical, this work was his first and only major work written in the third person. (The only other one was his short story Ein Tag im Spätsommer 1947.) Der Arzt Gion reflects a maturity and optimism which had been becoming increasingly evident in Carossa's works, but which seems strangely out of place in the depression-scarred, dictator-threatened Europe of 1931. From now on, except for a short period toward the end of World War II, the poet-doctor Carossa gave up medical practice completely. Carossa's last book before the Nazi Regime began was Führung und Geleit (1932), an inner survey rather than a true autobiography of his life from early youth to the 1920.

=== Nazi Germany ===
After the Nazi seizure of power in 1933, Carossa chose the Inner emigration and rejected his appointment to the German Academy of Poetry, but in 1938 he accepted the Goethe Prize of the City of Frankfurt, and in 1941 at the European Poets' Meeting he was appointed President of the European Writers' League, which was founded by Joseph Goebbels in 1941/42, vice president was Giovanni Papini. Carossa contributed a poem to an anthology that was published by August Friedrich Velmede and called "Dem Führer. Worte deutscher Dichter" (i.e. To the Leader. Words by German poets):

" ... Encouraged we return to our own task
and wish to the brave one,
to the fighter and leader who bears all our destiny
the best and good luck."

Next year he stayed away from the embarrassing event. Despite his distance from the Nazi regime, Carossa was one of the most promoted writers. In 1944, in the final phase of the Second World War, Carossa was included by Hitler on the Gottbegnadeten list, the list of the six most important German writers.

Success and honors in the neutral and friendly (fascist) foreign countries (Premio San Remo 1939) and the financial rise – quadrupling his income in 1941 – met an internally distanced Carossa, who also knew how to use his position. So in 1941 he stood up for the writer Alfred Mombert, who was endangered because of his Jewish heritage, so that Mombert was allowed to leave Germany for Switzerland. Shortly before the capitulation in 1945, Carossa pleaded in a letter to the Lord Mayor of Passau to hand over the city without a fight and was sentenced to death in absentia. The rapid approach of the US Army saved him.

=== After 1945 ===
After the war, Carossa processed his role in the Nazi era. However, his book Ungleiche Welten (Unequal Worlds) of 1951 was criticized, it veiled and glossed over, presented the poet as apolitical and the National Socialists as a power of fate against which no resistance was possible.

In West Germany he again achieved his popularity of the 1920s and 1930s. Federal President of Germany Theodor Heuss visited him at his home in 1954.

Hans Carossa is the namesake of his former school Hans-Carossa-Gymnasium Landshut and the former Hans-Carossa-Gymnasium in Berlin-Spandau, the elementary school in Pilsting (Lower Bavaria), the elementary school Passau-Heining – near which his last residence as well as his grave is located – the Hans-Carossa-Hospital in Stühlingen as well as a multitude of streets all over Germany, among others in Passau, Münster, Nuremberg and Berlin.

== Awards and honours ==
- 1928: Poetry prize of the city of Munich
- 1928: Prize of the city Eisenach
- 1931: Gottfried Keller Preis
- 1938: Goethe Prize of the City of Frankfurt
- 1939: San Remo Prize
- 1948: Honorary citizen of the cities of Passau and Landshut
- 1950: Member of the German Academy for Language and Literature
- 1953: Grand Cross of Merit of the Federal Republic of Germany
- Commemorative plaque for Hans Carossa in Munich

== Works ==
- Gedichte (1910) Poems
- Eine Kindheit (1922) autobiography, translated as A Childhood
- A Romanian Diary (1924), about the 3 months he spent as a military physician on the Romanian Front during World War I.
- Verwandlungen einer Jugend (1928) autobiography
- Doctor Gion (1931)
- Führung und Geleit (1933) essays
- Geheimnisse des reifen Lebens (1936)
- Das Jahr der schönen Täuschungen (1941) autobiography
- Der volle Preis (1945)
- Aufzeichnungen aus Italien (1946)
- Ungleiche Welten (1951)
- Tagebuch eines jungen Arztes (1955)
