= Raoul Auernheimer =

Austrian jurist and writer

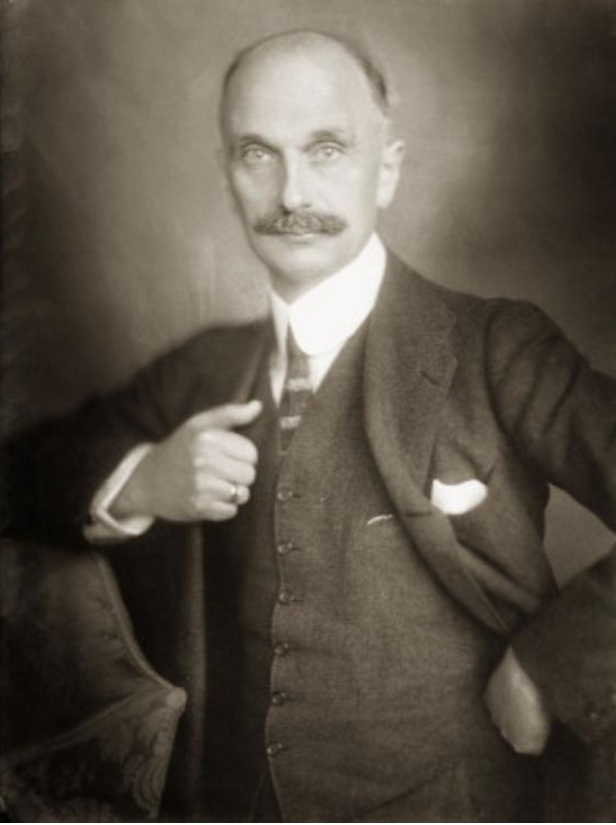
Raoul Auernheimer

Raoul Auernheimer (April 15, 1876 in Vienna – January 6, 1948, in Oakland, California) was an Austrian jurist and writer.

== Personal life ==
Auernheimer was born in April 15, 1876 in Vienna. He was the son of ethnic German businessman Johann Wilhelm Auernheimer and his Hungarian-Jewish wife Charlotte "Jenny" Büchler. At age 30, he married Irene Leopoldine Guttmann of Budapest.

== Education ==
After receiving his Abitur, Auernheimer began to study law at the university in his hometown. He concluded his studied with a doctorate in 1900 and became a court assessor in a Viennese court.

== Career ==
Through his maternal uncle, Theodor Herzl, he gained employment at the Neue Freie Presse. He wrote articles about the theater until 1933. In addition to his own name, he also used the pseudonyms Raoul Heimern and Raoul Othmar.

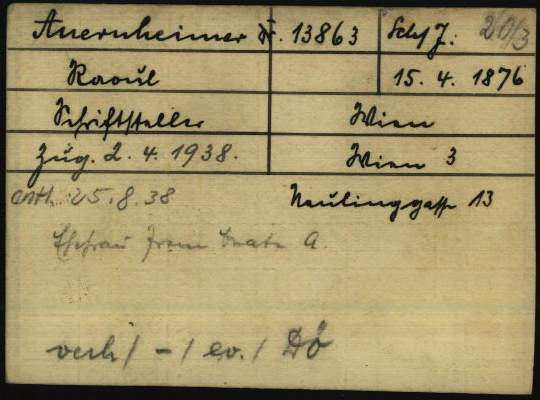
Registration card of Raoul Auernheimer as a prisoner at Dachau Nazi Concentration Camp

In 1923, he became a manager of the Austrian PEN association. He was president until 1927 and remained vice-president. In March 1938, he was arrested and interned in the Dachau concentration camp. Because of a request by writer Emil Ludwig, the general counsel of the United States Raymund Geist intervened against his arrest. At the end of 1938 he was released and emigrated to New York City.

== Works ==
- Aus unserer verlorenen Zeit. Vienna: Molden, 2004. ISBN 3-85485-106-5
- Franz Grillparzer: Der Dichter Österreichs. Vienna: Amalthea-Verl., 1972
- Josef-Kainz-Gedenkbuch. Vienna: Frisch, 1924
- Metternich: Staatsmann und Kavalier. Munich: Heyne, 1978. ISBN 3-453-55033-1
- Die rechte und die linke Hand. Graz: Styria Verl., 1999. ISBN 3-222-11635-0
- Das Wirtshaus zur verlorenen Zeit. Vienna: Ullstein, 1948
