= Mass media in Croatia =

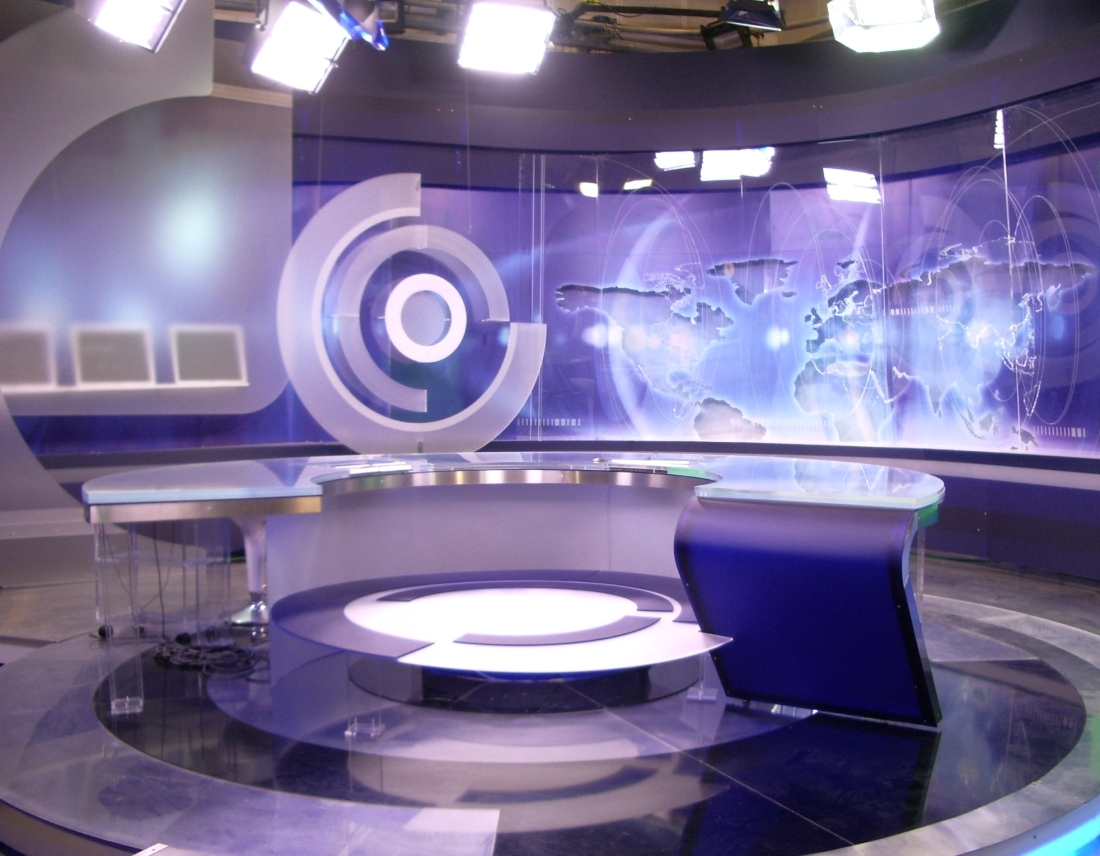
Dnevnik is one of HRT's popular news-programs.

The mass media in Croatia refers to mass media outlets based in Croatia. Television, magazines, and newspapers are all operated by both state-owned and for-profit corporations which depend on advertising, subscription, and other sales-related revenues. The Constitution of Croatia guarantees freedom of speech and Croatia ranked 63rd in the 2016 Press Freedom Index report compiled by Reporters Without Borders, falling by 5 places compared to the 2015 Index.

In broadcasting, the government-funded corporation Croatian Radiotelevision (HRT) had a monopoly on nationally aired broadcasting until the late 1990s, although a number of local radio and TV stations began to sprung up in the 1980s. In the years following the fall of communism and the subsequent liberalisation of the media market, HRT was reorganised with its infrastructure branch established as a separate company, Transmitters and Communications Ltd (OiV), and a system in which privately owned corporations can acquire renewable broadcast licenses at the national and county levels was adopted. The first national for-profit channel, Nova TV, was launched in 2000, and it was joined by RTL four years later in 2004. Both Nova TV and RTL are foreign-owned.

In print media, the market is dominated by the Croatian Europapress Holding and Austrian Styria Media Group companies, which publish their flagship dailies Jutarnji list, Večernji list and 24sata. Other widely read national dailies are Novi list and the government-owned Vjesnik. The most popular current affairs weekly is Globus, along with a number of specialized publications, some of which are published by government-sponsored cultural institutions. In book publishing, the market is dominated by several major publishing houses such as Školska knjiga, Profil, VBZ, Algoritam and Mozaik; the industry's centrepiece event is the Interliber trade fair held annually in Zagreb and open to public.

Croatia's film industry is small in size and heavily assisted by the government, mainly through grants approved by the Ministry of Culture, with films often being co-produced by HRT. The ministry also sponsors the Pula Film Festival, the annual national film awards, and a variety of specialised international film festivals such as Animafest and ZagrebDox, which often feature programs showcasing works by local filmmakers.

Internet is in widespread use in Croatia, with approximately 63% of the population having access from home in 2012.

== History ==
In May 1990, following Franjo Tuđman's election victory, he and his ruling Croatian Democratic Union party began a takeover of radio and television stations in Croatia. In June 1990, the Parliament of Croatia renamed the country's national broadcaster from Radio Television Zagreb (Croatian: Radiotelevizija Zagreb) to Croatian Radiotelevision (Croatian: Hrvatska radiotelevizija). The HDZ-majority Croatian Parliament soon appointed party loyalists to top managerial and editorial positions at the broadcaster. During this time, government-owned media was used to foment ethnic hatred in the midst of the Yugoslav wars. Publications were closed for political reasons under the pretext of privatization or restructuring.

Following Tudjman's death in 1999 and the defeat of the HDZ in the 2000 elections, media began to be liberalized.

In the early 1990s, the democratization process was accompanied by the strong role of the Croatian Journalists' Association (HND/CJA) as well as of Europapress Holding, the main publishing group. The latter recently faced a serious economic crisis also due to oversized ambitions. Similarly, cult station Radio 101 lately turned into a standard commercial broadcaster after a murky privatisation process.

== Legislative framework ==
The Constitution of Croatia protects freedom of expression and freedom of the press, bans censorship, and guarantees the rights of journalists to report and to access information. It guarantees the right to correction, if legal rights are violated by published news.

The media in Croatia are regulated by the Law on Media, the Law on Electronic Media, the Law on Croatian Radio-Television and the Law on the Right to Access Information. The Croatian legislation, including media law, has been harmonized with EU Law in the process of EU accession. The EU's Television Without Frontiers Directive has been transposed in Croatia within the Law on Electronic Media and the Law on Media; the provisions of the 2007 EU Audiovisual Media Services Directive have been included in the 2009 amendments to the Law on Electronic Media, including licenses for specialised media channels and non-for-profit municipal televisions and radio stations.

The Croatian Criminal Code and Civil Code contain provisions about defamation and libel. The burden of proof about libel has been shifted to the prosecutor since 2005. In 2005, four journalists were convicted to suspended prison sentences for libel; prison sentences for libel were then abolished in 2006.

Hate speech in Croatia leads to a maximum five-year prison sentence. Insulting "the Republic of Croatia, its coat of arms, national anthem, or flag" is also punishable with up to three years in prison.

In 2013 the Croatian parliament passed an amendment criminalizing "vilification", intended as systematic and deliberate defamation of a person, institution or legal entity. This was seen as worrying by media professionals, and later confirmed when an investigative reporter was fined in 2014. As IREX notes, "a journalist can be prosecuted even if reporting only verified facts if the judge thinks that the published facts are not 'in the public interest'".

OSCE Media Freedom Representative Dunja Mijatovic characterized the Croatian legal definitions of "insult" and "shaming" as "vague, open to individual interpretation and, thus, prone to arbitrary application", calling for decriminalisation by stating that "Free speech should not be subject to criminal charges of any kind".

Access to information in Croatia is a well-defined right, though limited by proportionality and public interest tests. An independent information commissioner monitors its compliance. There have been concerns about the mindset of the administration tending to reduce the public to a passive recipient of information. Journalists also lack training and resources to access information: only 7% of Croatian journalists ever asked for access to official documents.

The right to obtain corrections for all those whose rights or interests have been violated by information is enshrined in the Media Law; liability is upon editors-in-chief. In case of lack of correction, civil proceedings can be started.

Media ownership information disclosure is mandatory in Croatia. Yet, nominal ownership often does not equate to control: in Croatia's dire economic situation, several publishing groups are on lifelines extended by few major banks, often foreign ones. Information of basic vital financial data is not yet publicly available.

Media concentration is prevented by the Media Law, establishing a 40% ceiling for ownership of general information dailies or weeklies. Cross-ownership of national electronic media is allowed by the Law on Electronic Media, if it does not trespass a 25% threshold at every territorial (region, county, city) level. Holders of national broadcasting licenses are prevented from owning newspapers with a daily circulation of above 3,000 copies, or more than 10% shares of a news agency, and vice versa. Radio and television licenses are mutually exclusive. Holders of national and regional licences are forbidden from owning more than 30% share in similar media or local dailies in the broadcasting area.

License requirements for the media are deemed minimal, since they apply only to broadcast media making use of a limited public good (radio frequencies). Other media only need to register and declare their ownership structure.

Minority-language media receive subsidies through the Fund for Media Pluralisation (3% of HRT subscription fee). The Italian-language daily La Voce del Popolo has a 70-years history, while Serbian-minority weekly Novosti has a reach that goes well beyond its community.

=== Status and self-regulation of journalists ===
Public reputation of press journalists is low: a 2008 survey found 54% of respondents considered journalists to be influenced by political or economic interests.

No license is required to work as a journalist in Croatia, and the government has no way to exclude anyone from practicing journalism. Yet journalists are in a more and more dire professional condition, due to growing job insecurity linked to the degeneration of the general economic conditions in the country. Pressures have been mounting, while respect for ethical standards is in decline. Journalists "have no time, no money, no incentives, and, very often, not even the inner drive required to produce good journalists", as summed up by IREX. Investigative journalism is ever rarer, while most journalism tends to be "superficial, sensationalist, tabloid-style, and copy/paste". Advertorials and infotainment are also on the rise. In lack of specialised journalists, "experts" are often consulted, but they tend to be always the same and to simply confirm the journalist's position, rather than offering a variety of positions.

Journalists in Croatia have salaries in line with other professions, though often not regular, and around 20-20% lower than in 2007/2008. The average salary is of $1,200, but in the local media it can go down to half of that. Freelancing is not enough to earn a living, and young journalists often have to pick up second or third jobs too.

The Croatian Journalists' Association (CJA) has adopted a Code of Ethics. The Ethical Council of the association checks the compliance with the Code and inquires upon its violations, though it can only adopt public statements. The CJA Code of Ethics is deemed one of the best of its kind, and often used as a point of reference in other countries in transition. Yet, defamation and hate speech, particularly online, remain beyond acceptable standards.

The autonomy of journalists is to be guaranteed by individual media's bylaws, but as of 2010 only Jutarnji List has adopted a self-regulation about it.

== Media outlets ==
Advertising revenues in the Croatian media are in line with international standards (around 55% of their income), though their distribution is skewed towards the television market (up 75% of the total, in spite of 40% global averages).

=== Print media ===
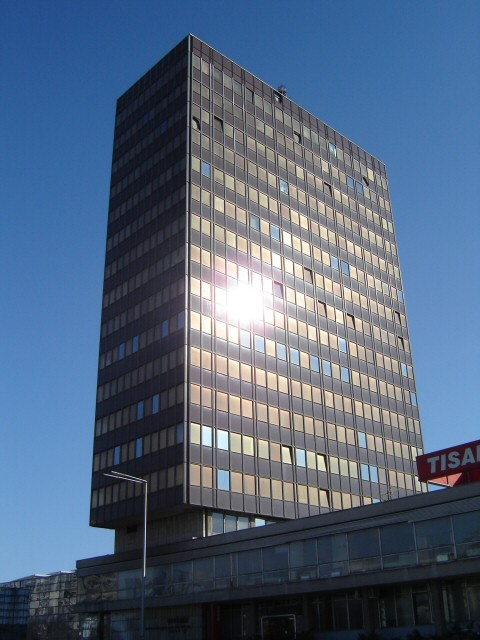
The Vjesnik building in Zagreb

Croatia has over 800 registered print publications, of which 9 national dailies and around the same number of weeklies and biweeklies.

There are several major daily newspapers in Croatia, including Jutarnji list, Večernji list, Slobodna Dalmacija, and Novi list.

- The tabloid 24 sata occupies the leading position in the daily market, soon since having been launched in 2005 by the Austrian publisher Styria. 24 Sata aimed for the youth market, with short stories and abundant photographs, being also sold at a lower price than its competitors.
- Jutarnji list and Večernji list counted upon 16% of market share each (2005), before the arrival of 24 Sata. In 2009, they had an estimated volume of 100,000 copies sold per day.
- Jutarnji list started in 1997, published by Europapress Holding (EPH), who one year later sold 50% to WAZ. EPH remains the main published on the Croatian market, with two daily newspapers, weeklies Globus and Arena and Croatian editions of Playboy and Cosmopolitan.
- Večernji list, once the leading state-owned daily, was bought by the Austrian publisher Styria Media Group in 2000. It maintained the traditional A3 format but adapted to a more tabloid-style layout.
- Slobodna Dalmacija is the fourth best-selling national newspaper, owing to its strong dominance (more than 50% of readers) in the Dalmatian region.
- Novi list, another regional-based daily, dominates in Rijeka and scores a 5% overall readership.
- Vjesnik used to be the leading newspaper in Yugoslav Croatia for six decades. As a state-owned company, it used to publish all national newspapers. Today it remains on the market, though with a very limited readership (1%, 5,000 copies in 2009).

In addition to these there are several regional dailies which are available throughout the country even though they mainly present regionally focused content. Examples of these are Glas Istre, Glas Slavonije, Zadarski list, Dubrovački vjesnik, etc.

There are also several specialized dailies. Sportske novosti and SportPlus provide sports coverage, while Business.hr and Poslovni dnevnik cover financial and business-related topics.

The most popular weekly news magazine was Globus, but during the last couple of years 7Dnevno gained more popularity and has a wider circulation. The Archdiocese of Zagreb also publishes Glas Koncila, a weekly magazine dedicated to presenting a Catholic perspective on current events and widely distributed in churches. Vijenac and Zarez are the two most influential bi-weekly magazines covering arts and culture. In addition, there is a wide selection of Croatian editions of international monthlies, such as Cosmopolitan, Elle, Grazia, Men's Health, National Geographic, Le Monde diplomatique, Playboy, Reader's Digest and Forbes.

No reliable numbers about print media circulation are available; the law mandates for it but foresees no penalty for inaction. Daily newspapers receive a preferential tax treatment, with an extra-low VAT (5%, compared to usual 25%). This has also given rise to concerns of arbitrary preference when compared with other Croatian media (non-dailies and non-print).

Seven years of economic recession took a strong toll from the Croatian print media. Some of Croatian editions of international monthlies, like GEO, were shut down. Advertising income halved, while daily circulation figures, at 300,000, are one third of their late 1990s values. The print media industry lost 40% of jobs since 2007, and employment and revenues figures will likely not be back before 2025. According to IREX, this points to "a contracted advertising market and a media management incapable of coping".

Press outlets in Croatia fight for a small advertising market, thus following a trend towards more tabloid-like media. Commercial pressure discourages investigative reporting, in favour of full-colour layout filled with photographs and ads, and submits media outlets to pressure from advertisers and their business interests, with concerns about self-censorship. Trivialisation of contents pushes trust in media even lower down, leading to a further drop in circulation. Stronger dependence on the main advertisers (retail chains, pharmaceutics companies, and mobile phone operations) hinders the editorial independence of the media, creating a "pyramid of fear": "Journalists fear they will lose their jobs. Editors fear they will lose their position with owners. Owners fear losing advertising income."

Printing facilities in Croatia are apolitical, privately owned, and only managed for business purposes. The presence of over-capacity and of cheaper press facilities in neighbouring countries favours customers' positions.

Distribution is unrestricted. Yet, the national print distribution system is under a nearly-complete monopoly, as a single distributor (Tisak) covers 90% of the market and is owned by the country's wealthiest individual, who also owns Croatia's biggest company, Agrokor, which is also the biggest advertiser and biggest advertising agency. Although this has not give rise to political pressure concerns, business pressures have been felt, since the distributor wanted to keep profits constant during the economic crisis, when the whole sector was at a loss. This led to a situation in which "distribution is suffocating the print industry".

Ownership concentration in the print media market is an issue, with Europa Press Holding (43% – 2011 data) and Styria Verlag (46%) controlling the bulk of the market.

=== Radio broadcasting ===
Croatia is served by a large number of radio stations (158 active radio stations: 6 nationally licensed, and 152 local and regional ones), with eight channels being broadcast on a national level. Four of these are operated by HRT (HR1, HR2, HR3 and Glas Hrvatske), in addition to two religious channels (the Croatian Catholic Radio (Hrvatski Katolički Radio, HKR) and Radio Marija) and two for-profit privately owned stations (Otvoreni Radio and Narodni Radio, the second only broadcasting music in Croatian). Antena Zagreb, relaunched in 2008 from the capital, soon reached a wide audience.

While state-owned radio stations focus on news, politics, classical music and arts, private radios followed the model of maximising music air time, mixed with short news on the hour. 40% of radio stations are deemed under state ownership, particularly local and municipal ones that receive funds from local budgets. Radio reporting has improved after the syndication of news broadcasts by Radio Mreža (Radio Network), a NGO providing free-of-charge news services for smaller radio stations.

=== Television broadcasting ===
Television remains the predominant source of information for Croatian citizens. Virtually all households have a colour television set, while instead half of the population do not read newspapers or listen to the radio. Croatia has 31 terrestrial TV channels: 10 national ones, and 21 local and regional ones. Television also controls the widest share of the advertising market (77%, or 700 million euros, in 2009).

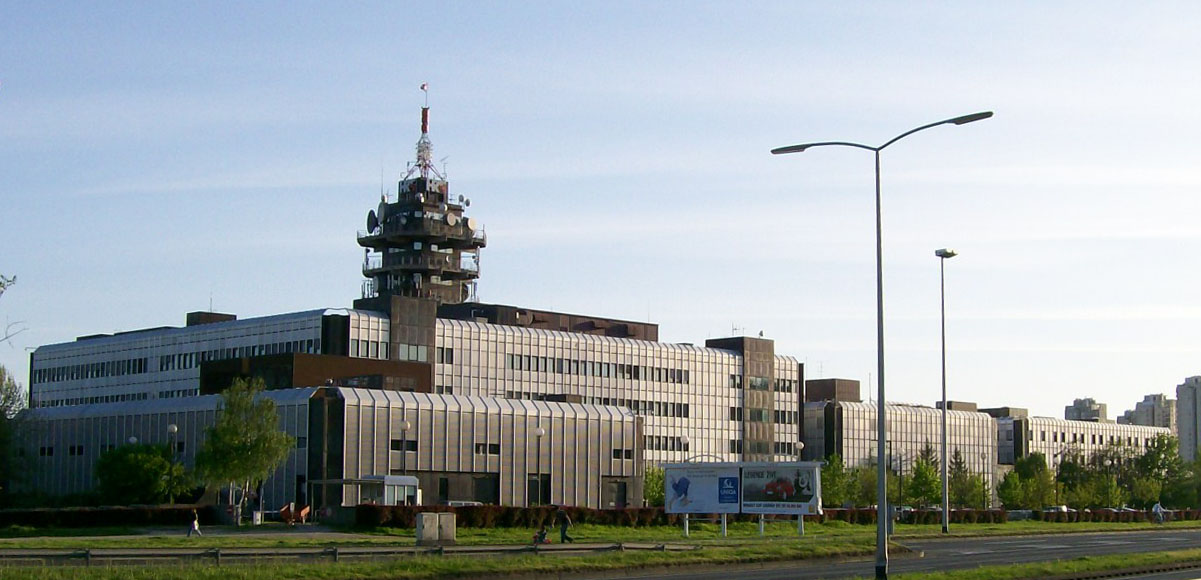
HRT headquarters at Prisavlje in Zagreb

The principal television station in Croatia is HTV, the television branch of the Croatian Radiotelevision (HRT), which is entirely state-owned and a member of the European Broadcasting Union. It is required by law to promote Croatian and provide programming which caters to all social groups in the country, and is mainly funded by a compulsory license fee (collected in monthly installments from all citizens owning a TV set, with a very high – 96% – collection rate), covering 50% of its budget, with additional revenue coming from advertising (though dropping from 40% of its budget in 2010 to less than 15% in 2015). HRT budget transparency is still wanting. HTV currently broadcasts four free-to-air channels available throughout the country (HRT 1, HRT 2, HRT 3 and HRT 4). The appointment of board members of the public service broadcaster HRT by simple parliamentary majority leaves it vulnerable to political influences and pressures. HRT has also been criticised for partisanship (including the arbitrary suspension of programs and politicised staff decisions ), lack of flexibility, lack of spots, and excessive subscription fees (1.5% of the average salary); its transition to a public service broadcaster, though, is still seen throughout the region as a successful model, ensuring a respectable audience and financial stability.

HTV channels trace their roots to RTV Zagreb which was established in 1956 as a regional division of Yugoslavia's national broadcaster JRT. Their second channel was launched in 1972 and following the breakup of Yugoslavia in 1990 RTV Zagreb was renamed HTV. Conversely, the channels became HTV1 and HTV2, with HTV3 added in 1994. Although a small number of local stations began operating in the 1980s, HTV had a monopoly on national broadcasting until 2000 – until when it was also under strict political control by the government.

That year HTV3 was shut down and its frequency was taken by the privately owned Nova TV which had won the first public tender for a national-level 10-year broadcast license in 1999. In 2003 a tender for the fourth national channel was offered, and was won by RTL Televizija, the Croatian subsidiary of the Bertelsmann-owned RTL Group, which came on air in 2004. After competing in the 2003 tender and losing to RTL, the media company Central European Media Enterprises bought Nova TV in August 2004 for €24 million. In April 2010 Nova TV's license was renewed for another 15 years.

In addition, in September 2010 the Electronic Media Council granted two new 15-year broadcast licenses in a tender for specialised nationally aired channels, won by Nova TV and RTL. The two new channels (Doma TV and RTL2) are expected to launch by Christmas 2010, and licenses alone will cost them HRK 450,000 (circa €60,000) per year.

Public and commercial TV channels have converged lately: the lighter approach of commercial channels (with movies, soap operas, games and entertainment) has been increasingly matched by state-owned channels, while commercial channels themselves have improved their news and information programmes, denting the HTV earlier monopoly. Advertisers have also increasingly shifted towards commercial channels.

Apart from the nationally aired channels, there is a number (around 20) of regional and local television stations which lease county-level licenses. Although they are all privately owned, they are also in part state-funded as the Electronic Media Act stipulates that a percentage of HRT license fees collected from citizens must be invested into the development of local media outlets through Electronic Media Agency's Fund for Promoting Pluralism and Diversification of Electronic Media (Fond za poticanje pluralizma i raznovrsnosti elektroničkih medija). In 2009, the fund granted a total of HRK 31.4 million (€4.3 million) or 3 percent of license fees collected, to 21 local TV channels and 147 radio stations. In 2010 the largest individual grant among television stations was received by VTV, a local channel based in Varaždin (HRK 1.1 million), while Radio Istra, a local station covering Istria, was the largest radio recipient with HRK 182,000.

Local stations with the biggest viewership and budgets are generally the ones based in large and medium-sized cities, such as OTV and Z1 stations in Zagreb, STV and TV Jadran in Split, ČKTV in Čakovec, RiTV in Rijeka, etc.

Cable television (CATV) is also a popular method of programming delivery in Croatia, and is available in several large cities throughout the country. The biggest cable provider is B.net, established in 2007, which is available in Osijek, Rijeka, Solin, Split, Velika Gorica, Zadar and Zagreb. As of 2010 some 250,000 households are subscribed to B.net's cable packages. Internet Protocol television (IPTV) is also gaining ground in recent years, with most ISPs offering a wide selection of channels very similar to cable packages. A basic cable or IPTV package in Croatia traditionally includes:

- major Croatian channels (HTV1, HTV2, HTV3, HTV4, Nova TV and RTL)
- a mix of major networks from neighbouring countries (Bosnian OBN, FTV and Hayat, Serbian RTS SAT, Slovenian SLO1 and SLO2, Italian Rai 1 and Rai 2, Austrian ORF1 and ORF2)
- a selection of local TV stations (OTV, Z1, ČKTV, STV, TV Jadran, etc.)

Analogue terrestrial television was switched off in Croatia on 5 October 2010 for national TV stations, although some local stations still broadcast analogue signal. HRT first started transmitting in digital programming in 1997 (in DVB-S) and has since entirely switched its TV channels (HTV1, HTV2, HTV3 and HTV4), and three radio stations (HR1, HR2 and HR3) to digital format. The DVB-T format was first introduced in early 2002. The nine nationally broadcast free-to-air channels (HTV1, HTV2, HTV3, HTV4, RTL, Nova TV...) were carried via a network of nine main transmitters built by the state-owned company Transmitters and Communications Ltd (Odašiljači i veze or OiV; formerly a branch of HRT), completed in 2007 and covering about 70 percent of the country. The analogue switch-off process took place gradually region by region during 2010, starting with Istria and Rijeka in January and ending with Zagreb on 5 October 2010 when the entire country was converted to the DVB-T digital format.

Subsidies to the local broadcast media come from the Fund for Electronic Media Pluralisation, funded by the 3& of HRT subscription fees. The Fund finances "productions of public interest" of up to $120,000 for a total annual budget of 6 to 7 million $, with some aspects of positive discrimination towards minority-language media. It has lately become a lifeline for a good part of the local broadcast media.

=== Cinema ===
Croatian cinema had big successes during Socialist Yugoslavia. After enduring hardship in the 1990s, cinema came back in the 2000s. Croatian cinema produced 6 to 9 feature movies each year, presented at festivals such as the Motovun Film Festival, Zagreb Film Festival and Pula Film Festival, as well as the ZagrebDox festival of documentaries.

The Croatian Audiovisual Centre was established in 2008 as the strategic public agency for the audiovisual sector, tasked with professional training and the financing of production, distribution and promotion of audiovisual works.

=== Internet ===
The Internet country code top-level domain for Croatia is .hr and is administered by CARNET (Croatian Academic and Research Network). Registrants are classified into a number of different groups with varying rules of domain registrations. Some verifiable form of connection to Croatia – such as being a Croatian citizen or a permanent resident, or a company registered in the country – is common to all of the categories except for the .com.hr subdomain. Third level domains (example.com.hr) are allowed to be registered by anyone in the world as long as they provide a local contact. As of 2009, half of Croatian households had access to internet, and 40% to broadband. New regulations plan to provide at least 1 Mbit/s broadband also in the rural areas; initial-level internet packages remain affordable, at around $40/month. 69% of the population used internet in 2014.

As of September 2011 the most visited .hr websites are the Croatian version of Google followed by news websites Net.hr and Index.hr and online editions of printed dailies Jutarnji list and 24sata. As of December 2014, Croatia had 170 registered web portals, although many of them resort to "copy/paste journalism", mirroring contents.

Around 60% of the population is active on Facebook and Twitter. Social media have proved a platform for off-line social engagement in Croatia, with the first "Facebook protests" organised by high school students in Autumn 2008, and other events leading to the removal of corrupted local politicians, e.g. in Sisak. Two of the main appealing political groups for the young voters, the environmentalists of ORaH and the anti-eviction Živi zid, are strongly based on the internet.

In late 2013, Wikipedia in Croatian (Wikipedija na hrvatskom jeziku, also hr:wiki) received attention from international media for promoting fascist, right-wing worldview as well as bias against Serbs of Croatia and Anti-LGBT propaganda by the means of historical revisionism and by negating or diluting the severity of crimes committed by the Ustaše regime (see Croatian Wikipedia). As of August 2019, this version has more than 200,000 articles, making it the 40th largest edition of Wikipedia.

== Concentration of media ownership ==
=== Legal framework ===
The international standards in the field of media pluralism and diversity applied in Croatian media policy are those developed by the Council of Europe, which defines pluralism and diversity in terms of structural (ownership) diversity in the media market and in terms of pluralism of ideas and cultural diversity.

After the year 2000, Croatia introduced a new set of media legislation, including measures to control mono-media and cross-media ownership concentration. The Media Law (2004) limits concentration in the printed media, while the Law on electronic media (2003) limits cross-media ownership.

Limiting concentration of media ownership was one of the main objectives of the new media legislation adopted in 2003. In addition, in Croatia the issue of concentration is regulated by the Law on the Protection of Market Competition, a general law that in Article 18 forbids any kind of concentration that can endanger market competition.

A specific provision in the Media Act limits ownership concentration with regard to press outlets only: it is limited to media outlets whose market share in terms of total sold copies exceeds 40 percent.

National and regional licenses prevent licenses from having more than 30 percent share in similar media or in local daily newspapers in the broadcasting area.

The Law on Electronic Media, passed in 2003 and amended in 2007, 2008 and in 2009, to complete the transposition of the EU Audiovisual Directive allows cross-media ownership of national electronic media, if the ownership does not exceed 25 percent. National broadcasting license excludes ownership in any daily newspapers with circulation above 3.000 or ownership of more than 10 percent in any news agency and vice versa. It also prevents advertising agencies holding more than 10 percent of shares in advertising agencies to hald shares in television or radio outlets. The law also defines the meaning of "connected/affiliated parties", meaning individuals connected through family, marriage, relatives, shareholders, etc. that are taken into consideration when determining media concentration.

The 2009 amendments to the Law on Electronic Media extended the anti-concentration measures also to the Internet and other distributors/providers as well as to non-linear services, such as on-demand TV.

The Agency for the Protection of Market Competition monitors and reviews all planned concentration in the media sector, regardless of the total revenue of the companies. Also the Council for Electronic Media must be notified of every change in the ownership structure. If the Agency finds a case of improper concentration, the broadcaster will be given a period of time to bring the structure within legal limits. In case of non-compliance, the Council for Electronic Media can revoke the concession.

=== Media concentration in practice ===
Concentration of power held by a few main commercial players is among the main problems affecting media ownership in Croatia.

According to the Media Pluralism Monitor (MPM) 2015, concentration of media ownership in Croatia scores a medium level of risk (49%). The MPM report also finds out that legal safeguards preventing the concentration of media ownership are well monitored and implemented in the audiovisual and radio sector, but are not equally effective with regard to concentration in the print sector. Concentration can also be prevented via merger control rules, but the Agency for market competition protection does not regularly perform active monitoring. Even if it has started to conduct self-initiated investigations in cases of suspect ownership concentration, it usually continues mostly to react to companies' reports.

Data on Croatia's media market and shares also shows that there are some issues with media ownership concentration. For instance, market share analysis shows that the main market sectors (audiovisual, radio, digital content providers) are highly concentrated, meaning that the top four media companies have more than 50% of the market.

As for concentration of cross-media ownership, according to the MPM 2015, indicators shows a low level of risk. According to the Monitor, the authorities in charge of monitoring compliance with the rules do not use their powers in preventing concentration in all relevant cases.

Media concentration in Croatia occurs in semi-legal ways, in the grey areas that are not properly regulated, typically in sectors that are not related to the media. In addition, new ways of concentration are practiced in order to diminish the costs and increase power, such as in the case of radio networks.

Large media are widely owned by foreign owners: this is, for instance, the case of the television market (RTL, Nova), press (WAS, Styria Media Group), and partly the internet market (Deutsche Telecom). The radio market is, on the contrary, mainly in domestic ownership. Press distribution and advertising, which keeps all commercial media alive, is mainly controlled by Tisak – the largest chain of newsstands in the country controlled by Croatian business Agrokor.

== Media organisations ==
=== News agencies ===
The Croatian state still owns the main news agency, HINA (Hrvatska Izvještajna Novinska Agencija), founded in 1991 and providing 300 news items daily to all media in the country. HINA has adapted to market conditions, providing competitive and affordable wires for the national media. Several international news agencies operate in Croatia, including Associated Press (AP), Agence France Press (AFP) and Reuters, but they remain prohibitively expensive for the local services.

Other agencies are IKA (Informative Catholic Agency, owned by the Croatian Episcopal Conference) and STINA, a regional private agency, specialized in diversity and minority reporting.

The law requires all private commercial broadcastees to produce their own news programming. This has led to crisp and infotainment news, but also reaches bigger audiences. Local radios and TVs, though, that have not found the commercial potential of news, have complained against the obligation. Radijska Mreža, an independent radio news agency, broadcasts news daily and free-of-charge for regional radio stations.

=== Trade unions ===
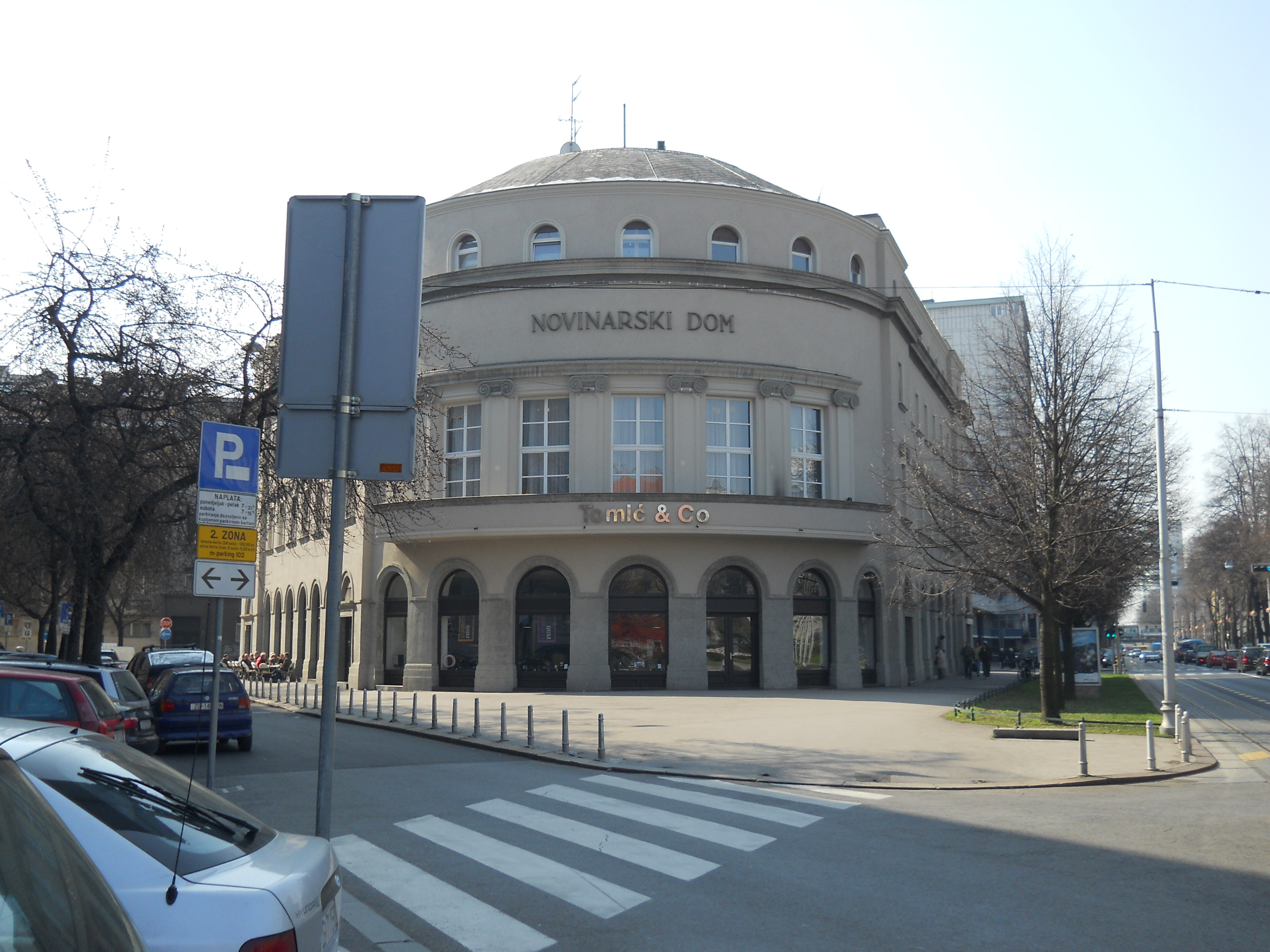
The building in Zagreb where the HND is located is called Novinarski dom, lit. "Journalists' home".

The Hrvatsko novinarsko društvo (HND), or Croatian Journalists' Association (CJA), associates nearly all Croatian journalists (more than 3,000, of whose 60% in Zagreb). Founded in 1910, as one of the oldest professional associations in Croatia, it adhered in 1992 to the International Federation of Journalists. The HND works together with the Trade Union of Croatian Journalists to protect journalists' labour and social rights. The HND has an almost unparalleled continuity in the region.; in the early 1990s it was pivotal in fostering the democratisation process and the respect of human rights in the country. Yet, its membership has been in decline, as the print media industry has lost 40% of its jobs during the crisis, while old and new journalists have been recruited based on part-time or freelance contracts, thus not meeting HND membership requirements.

In 2015, Hrvatski novinari i publicisti (HNiP) or Croatian Journalists and Publicists, was formed. The association has a small membership and has gained attention for its right-wing sentiments, one of its famous acts being the support of the former Croatian culture minister Zlatko Hasanbegović, after Hasanbegović was criticised by the Simon Wiesenthal Center for his comments on Croatia's history during World War II.

The Hrvatska udruga radija i novina (HURIN), or Croatian Association of Radio Stations and Newspapers, gathers 140 radio stations and 30 regional newspapers. The 16 largest publishers are members of the Udruga novinskih izdavača (Association of Newspaper Publishers), itself part of Croatian Employers' Association. Together with HURIN it covers about 80 percent of employees in Croatian media.

NGOs that work for better media professional standards include Gong and B.a.B.e.

Publishers and editors are also united in associations, such as the Association of Publishers, the National Association of Television Stations, the Croatian Association of Radio and Newspapers, and the associations of commercial TV stations and of web portals.

=== Regulatory authorities ===
The Croatian Parliament has a Committee for Information, ICT and Media, in which media issues are debated. The Committee takes part in legislative drafting about print and electronic media.

The National Agency for Telecommunications of Croatia included a Telecommunications Users Council, to mediate out-of-court disputes between users and providers of telecommunications services. The Users Council also works as advisory body on consumers' rights protection. In 2009 the Agency disbanded the Users Council and directly took over its tasks.

The main regulatory body for broadcasting is the government's Electronic Media Agency through its Electronic Media Council (Vijeće za elektroničke medije or VEM), which is in charge of reviewing and granting all television and radio broadcast licenses and ensuring that programming is in line within the legal framework set in the Parliament of Croatia's Electronic Media Act. This makes it the local equivalent of similar regulatory agencies such as the Federal Communications Commission in the United States. The Council for Electronic Media releases the broadcasting licenses, according to the Electronic Media Law; any change in ownership structure must be reported by publishers to the council, as well as to the Agency for the Protection of Market Competition. The council can issue warnings, file charges, make recommendations, and support self-regulation. Frequency allocation by the Agency has been transparent for some time; its main challenges still concern the independence of its members from the political arena (particularly in terms of their appointment) and the lack of expertise of its stuff, leading it to underestimate the need for alternative web radios too.

The Constitution of the Republic of Croatia bans censorship.

In its recent history, Croatia has experienced most of the problems which are common in post-socialist states, including self-censorship, threats against journalists, pressure by advertisers and political actors, etc.

A common practice for exerting pressure over journalists in Croatia is to issue transfers, demotions and public warnings to editors and journalists for political reasons. Several distinguished journalists have had to move from one media outlet to another due to these pressures while unemployment among journalists is increasing. Many of these cases occurred in some of the most influential Croatian media outlets, i.e. the Croatian Public Television (HRT) and EPH/WAZ. Journalists that have moved to less prominent outlets have faced fewer restrictions with less pressure and censorship. Also, many journalists have left their profession at all, opting not to work in the field of media due to increasing pressure and restrictions and decreasing professionalism.

According to the organisation Index on Censorship, since 2013 threats and attacks against journalists have been less serious. The Croatian Association of Journalists and the Organisation for Security Cooperation in Europe (OSCE) have asked to end impunity for crimes committed against journalists since they led to self-censorship, one of the primary threat to media freedom. One of the main factor leading to self-censorship in Croatia is libel laws.

Croatia ranked 63rd in the 2016 Press Freedom Index report compiled by Reporters Without Borders, falling by 5 places if compared to the 2015 Index and halting the positive trend since 2009. Freedom House ranks Croatia as "Partly Free", 80th over 199 countries, after Hungary and Montenegro and before Bosnia and Herzegovina and the Republic of Macedonia.

Although by now "a truly internalized value", freedom of speech in Croatia suffers from a certain fatigue in times of deep economic crisis, after many consecutive years of recession. New legislative measures, such as the 2013 norm on "vilification", seem to go in the wrong direction. Paradoxically, international pressures have eased after Croatia's accession to the European Union, and media freedom in the country is today deemed in a worse condition than in 2013.

The European Federation of Journalists, in cooperation with Croatia's HND and SNH associations, have established in July 2015 the Croatian Center for the Protection of Freedom of Expression to provide legal protection to journalists.

In 2023, the draft of a Media Act, proposed by the Croatian Government drew criticism from the Croatian Journalists’ Association HND. The Media Act would give publishers the right to not publish journalistic pieces without explanation, which the HND fears would lead to self censorship. The Law also drew criticism for the proposed establishment of a Register for Journalist and the need for journalists to reveal their sources of information. The Croatian government also received criticism for the weak protection of journalists against SLAPP lawsuits.

=== Attacks and threats against journalists ===
Crimes against journalists have declined in the recent years. Although no Croatian journalist has lost her/his life lately, threats against journalists persist. Yet, courts have lately started taking verbal threats more seriously too. 2015 marked a deterioration of the situation, with 14 cases reported between May and August alone, compared to the 24 cases in May 2014/May 2015.

In 2011 the Association of Croatian Investigative Journalists (ACIJ) published a White Paper with 70 stories of censorship and intimidation against journalists since the early 1990s. Impunity remains a big issue, due to lack of follow-up to police reports, prosecutors accusating assailants for minor charges (e.g. disturbance to peace rather than assault), and lack of investigations in the crime orchestrators rather than only in the hitmen. Journalists working on war crimes, organised crime and corruption have been particularly at risk.

- In 2008 two journalists, Ivo Pukanić and Niko Franjić were killed in a car bomb attack. The same year, Dušan Miljuš, an investigative journalist, was subject to an attempted murder.
- In 2010 the far-right Autochthonous Croatian Party of Rights (A-HSP) publicly burned a copy of the minority publication Novosti.
- In March 2014 the effigy of journalist Vinko Vuković was burned at the Omiš carnival after he had reported on corruption in the town. A similar event happened one year later in Proložac, targeting Slobodna Dalmacija reporter Ante Tomić. Tomić had already been attacked for his works.
- In June 2014, journalist Drago Pilsel received a death threat after reporting about Dario Kordić, a war criminal who had recently been released from prison.
- In August 2014, the journalist and activist Domagoj Margetić was assaulted and beaten by a group of persons near his house in Zagreb. The case was characterised by the prosecutor as attempted murder
- In October 2014 a drug dealer in Rijeka was sentenced to eight months in prison for a death threat against a local journalist.
- The same month, Karlovac-based investigative journalist Željko Peratović (winner of the 2014 Croatian Journalists Association award for investigative journalism) was physically attacked at his home and hospitalized with head injuries. Three suspects are investigated. The OSCE Media Freedom representative condemned the events. Peratovic had been sued by the Interior Ministry in 2010-2011 for its reports on war crimes investigations.
- In July 2015, the graphic designer of Hrvatski tjednik was physically assaulted by two men who tried to choke him on a wire and threatened him with a gun to his head within the newspapers' premises in Zadar. The assault led to destruction of the newspapers' premises. The HND head Lekovic decried the event as an attack on the freedom of expression. H-Alter journalist Hrvoje Simicevic was also assaulted.
- Death threats were addressed in 2015, among others not made public, to Katarina Maric Banje, journalist for Slobodna Dalmacija, Drago Pilsel, editor-in-chief of the Autograf website, Domagoj Mikić, journalist with Nova TV, and Sasa Lekovic, president of the Croatian Journalists' Association. All the cases have remained unsolved.

=== Political and economic interferences ===
Cases of political pressures, censorship and self-censorship are still reported in Croatia. While physical integrity of journalists is not at stake, more subtle political and business pressures and the lack of job security still hinder the editorial independence of the Croatian media and foster self-censorship among their journalists. The appointment of board members of the public service broadcaster HRT by simple parliamentary majority leaves it vulnerable to political influences and pressures.

- In May 2014, Index.hr was scrutinised by the authorities after it had critically reported on Croatia's financial issues, in a move that was deemed punitive. An Index.hr journalist also had problems receiving information from the Split mayor in May 2014 after he had published critical articles on the town administration.
- In October 2015, the president of the Croatian Football Federation (HNS), Davor Šuker, banned the representatives of Index.hr from a press conference in Zagreb, confiscating one of their mobile phones. Index.hr had already been banned from HNS sport and press events, since the Federation was not pleased with the media reporting on the appointment of Ante Cacic as coach. The HND condemned the behaviour and reiterated the call to lift the ban on Index.hr professionals.
- In October 2015, two op-eds by Damir Pilic, long-time columnist of Slobodna Dalmacija, were dismissed by the editorial board, possibly because of inconsistency with the editorial line of the newspaper, increasingly leaning towards the right in the contest of the upcoming general elections. The op-eds concerned the internal politics of the HDZ party, and Europe's influence on the USA/Russia disputes.

Media ownership in Croatia still carries several issues. Tycoons use editorial policy as a long-arm of their own business interests, while journalists try to anticipate their wishes, thus resorting to self-censorship and partisan journalism.

- In late 2014 a major publisher changed ownership, being acquired by a wealthy lawyer. The leading media company's daily a couple of days ago published a laudatory interview with Zagreb mayor Milan Bandić, omitting that he had just been released from prison on a 4 million dollars bail, paid privately by his lawyer – the publisher's new owner.

The Catholic Church, the war veterans and the biggest advertisers are still deemed "sensitive topics" in Croatian journalism. International politics gets limited coverage – and mostly reactive – while social issues (unemployment, depopulation, lack of use of EU funds) do not receive enough coverage either.

- In January 2016, a journalist from the Novosti magazine was sanctioned by the Croatian Journalists' Association for a satirical version of the national anthem, published a couple of days after the Veterans' Day.

Those local media that are partly owned by local governments receive benefits in kind, such as free office spaces. In turn, they tend not to be critical of the authorities they live off. Local media also benefit from a norm requiring local governments to invest at least 15% of their advertising budgets in local commercial media.

- In October 2015 Journalists have protested against obstruction of their work by police forces in the context of the refugee crisis. The Croatian border police had prevented a number of journalists, including from Al Jazeera, Reuters and Associated Press, from reporting from the border area. Some equipment had been initially confiscated. Two journalists from AFP and Reuters have accused the police of physically attacking them; the authorities claimed they had entered the country illegally.

=== Civil defamation lawsuits ===
According to the Croatian Journalists' Association (HND), as of April 2014 there were more than 40 pending criminal cases against journalists for defamation and insult.

- The private RTL television station was sued by Zagreb mayor Milan Bandić after it broadcast an interview in 2013 in which PM Zoran Milanović accused Bandić of corruption. In September 2014 the Zagreb municipal civil court found RTL guilty and ordered it to pay 50,000 kuna (ca. $8,400) to Bandic.
- Slavica Lukić was the first Croatian journalist to be convicted for "vilification" after the new provision was inserted in the Criminal Code in 2013. She had reported that the medical company Medikol faced economic troubles, notwithstanding state subsidies. She was fined 26,000 kuna ($4,700).

=== Smear campaigns ===
- In March 2014, government officials publicly tried to discredit journalist Danka Derifaj after she had reported on patronage and nepotism in the local administration of Jastrebarsko.

=== Freedom on the internet ===
- A citizen was arrested and fined in July 2014 in Đakovo for offending and patronizing police officers on Facebook. The OSCE Media Freedom representative stigmatised the event, calling for legislative review to decriminalise insult and libel, calling it "unacceptable to arrest, fine or imprison people for their views, regardless of how, when and where they are expressed".

== See also ==
- Telecommunications in Croatia
- List of radio stations in Croatia
- List of newspapers in Croatia
- List of magazines in Croatia
- List of Croatian language television channels
