= List of newspapers in Croatia =

Below is a list of newspapers published in Croatia.

== List of publications ==
National dailies

- 24sata (est. 2005, based in Zagreb; number one tabloid in the country in terms of circulation) 24sata.hr
- Jutarnji list (est. 1998, based in Zagreb) jutarnji.hr
- Novi list (est. 1900, based in Rijeka; the oldest Croatian newspaper still in existence) novilist.hr
- Slobodna Dalmacija (est. 1943, based in Split) slobodnadalmacija.hr
- Večernji list (est. 1959, based in Zagreb) vecernji.hr

Specialized dailies

- Poslovni dnevnik (est. 2004, business and financial daily) poslovni.hr
- Sportske novosti (est. 1945, based in Zagreb; sports daily) sportske.jutarnji.hr

Regional dailies

- Glas Istre (based in Pula; covers Istria region) glasistre.hr
- Glas Slavonije (based in Osijek; covers Slavonia) glas-slavonije.hr
- Dubrovački vjesnik (based in Dubrovnik, covers the city and south Dalmatia) dubrovacki.hr
- Zadarski list (based in Zadar, covers Zadar County) zadarskilist.hr

Weekly

- Narodni list (est. 1862, based in Zadar) narodni-list.hr

Official gazette

- Narodne novine (est. 1835, based in Zagreb) nn.hr

Publications in other languages

- Novosti (in Serbian and Croatian) portalnovosti.com
- La Voce del Popolo (in Italian) editfiume.com/lavoce

== Historical and defunct ==
18th century

- Agramer Deutsche Zeitung - published in 1786 by J. T. Trattner; based in Zagreb and published in German; no surviving copies have been found
- Ephemerides Zagrabienses - the first newspaper ever published in Croatia, in 1771; published as a weekly in Zagreb by Antun Jandera; there are no surviving copies in existence
- Kroatischer Korrespondent - established in 1789 and printed in German; the third newspaper published in Croatia and the oldest newspaper with a surviving copy

19th century

- Crvena Hrvatska - in existence from 1890 to 1899, published by the Croatian Party of Rights in Dalmatia
- Il Regio Dalmata – Kraglski Dalmatin - bilingual newspaper (in Italian and Croatian); first edition published in Zadar on 12 July 1806; the first newspaper printed in Croatian
- Narodni list - established in 1862; the oldest living newspaper in Croatia; its first issue was published on March 1, 1862, as a Croatian-language part of the Italian-language newspaper Il Nazionale
- Novine Horvatske - established in 1835 by Ljudevit Gaj and printed in Croatian; in 1836 the paper switched from Kajkavian to Shtokavian dialect and was renamed Ilirske narodne novine; played an important role in the Illyrian movement

20th century

- Feral Tribune – began as a political satire supplement in Slobodna Dalmacija daily in 1984; later evolved into an independent political weekly from 1993 onwards; folded in 2008
- Republika – daily newspaper launched in late 2000 by media entrepreneur Ivo Pukanić, intended to compete with Europapress Holding's flagship daily Jutarnji list; folded after six months in May 2001
- Slobodni tjednik – published 1990–1993, the first Croatian tabloid daily launched during the political turmoil in the early 1990s
- Sportplus – published from December 2009 to March 2011 as a sports daily spun off from Novi list to compete with Sportske novosti; after 2011 merged back into Novi list
- Vjesnik – published 1940–2012, major government-owned daily
- Business.hr – published 2005–2014, business and financial daily, which competed against Poslovni dnevnik

== See also ==
- Media in Croatia
- List of magazines in Croatia
- Actual list with Croatian newspapers
