= List of magazines in Croatia =

List of magazines in Croatia is an incomplete list of magazines published in Croatia.

== Contemporary ==
=== Magazines ===
- BUG (1992), monthly computer magazine
- Drvo znanja (1998), monthly youth magazine
- Globus (1990), weekly newsmagazine
- Gloria (1994), weekly women's magazine
- Hrvatska revija, quarterly magazine published by Matica hrvatska
- Hrvatski vojnik (1991), weekly military magazine published by the Ministry of Defence
- Modra lasta (1954), children's monthly
- Nacional (1995), weekly
- Novi Plamen (2007), political quarterly
- Novosti, Serbian minority magazine
- Oris (1999), magazine for architecture
- PC Chip, monthly computer magazine
- Republika (1945), monthly magazine for literature, art and society
- Vidi (1994), monthly computer magazine
- Vijenac (1993), biweekly magazine for literature, art and science published by Matica hrvatska
- VP: Magazin za vojnu povijest (2011), monthly magazine about the history of war
- Zarez (1999), biweekly magazine for literature, arts and culture
- PLACE2GO (2006), travel magazine, quarterly

==== International magazines ====
- Cosmopolitan
- Elle
- FHM
- Forbes
- FourFourTwo
- GEO
- Grazia
- Men's Health
- Le Monde diplomatique
- National Geographic
- Playboy
- Reader's Digest

== Defunct ==
=== Magazines ===
==== Computer ====
- GamePlay

==== Literary ====
- Kokot (1916-1918)

==== Men's magazines ====
- Start (1969-1971)

==== Music ====
- Pop Express (1969-1970)

==== Politics ====
- Feral Tribune (1993-2008)
- Hrvatska ljevica (1993-2005)

==== Regional ====
- Nedjeljna Dalmacija (1971-2002)

==== Tabloid ====
- Slobodni tjednik (1990-1993)

==== Women's magazines ====
- Mila (1988-2006)
- Tena (1999-2008)

== See also ==
- Media in Croatia
- List of newspapers in Croatia
