= Internet in Croatia =

Internet in Croatia was established in November 1992 when the first international connection linking Zagreb and Vienna became operational.

By 2022, 77% of the population, including 97% of youth aged 16 to 24, regularly use the internet, mainly for news, video calls, and entertainment, aligning with EU averages. The country ranks 14th among EU nations in digital technology integration, with enterprise adoption of advanced technologies being notable: 35% use cloud solutions, 43% implement e-invoices, and 9% apply AI solutions. Despite this progress and having completed 5G spectrum allocations in 2021, Croatia's ranking in the 2022 Digital Economy and Society Index (DESI) is 21st out of 27 EU Member States.

== User statistics ==
- Top-level domain: .hr, administered by the Croatian Academic and Research Network (CARNET).
- Internet users:
  - 3.17 million users (2016).
  - 2.8 million users, 80th in the world; 63.0% of the population, 59th in the world (2012);
  - 2.2 million users (2009).
  - 1.7 million Facebook users (2016).
  - 88% of households have internet access (2025)
- Fixed broadband: 909,090 subscriptions, 58th in the world; 20.3% of the population, 48th in the world (2012).
- Wireless broadband: 2.3 million subscribers, 60th in the world; 52.3% of the population, 26th in the world (2012).
- Internet hosts: 729,420 hosts, 50th in the world (2012).
- IPv4: 2.0 million addresses allocated, less than 0.05% of the world total, 455.9 addresses per 1000 people (2012).
- Total volume of Internet traffic: 160 petabytes (Q2 2016)

== History ==
The first international Internet connection was established on 17 November 1992, between CARNET in Zagreb and the University of Vienna, with a speed of 64 kbps, and a bandwidth of 9600 bit/s.

The .hr domain was first registered in March 1993.

== Technologies and services ==
=== Fixed broadband ===
In 2021, Croatia demonstrated notable developments in its fixed broadband infrastructure. The overall fixed broadband take-up rate increased to 75%, although it remains slightly below the EU average of 78%. However, there is room for improvement in the adoption of high-speed fixed broadband, with only 16% of households subscribing to at least 100 Mbps services, significantly lower than the EU average of 41%. Croatia's Fixed Very High Capacity Network (VHCN) coverage reached 52%, though it still falls short of the EU average of 70%. Fiber to the Premises (FTTP) coverage also expanded to 39%, although it remains below the EU average of 50%.

=== Mobile broadband ===
Croatia has made notable strides in mobile broadband, with a mobile broadband take-up rate of 81% in 2021, slightly below the EU average of 87%. The country is actively working towards achieving the 2025 Gigabit target, expanding 5G wireless broadband coverage in urban areas and major transport routes. Major mobile operators have acquired spectrum with coverage obligations, aiming for extensive coverage on highways, railways, and urban areas by 2025, and 50% coverage in rural areas by 2027.

Mobile broadband Internet access is offered by the three national concession GSM operators:

- T-Mobile Croatia,
- VIPnet (Vodafone partner), and
- Tele2 Croatia.

There are both pre-paid and post-paid plans. All three providers cooperate with CARNET to provide a discount for users in the academic and education community - ordered by seniority they are named Mobile CARNET/VipmeCARNET (VIPnet), Tele2CARNET (Tele2 Croatia), Stick2CARNET (T-Mobile HR).

It is not mandatory to register any personal data upon purchasing a prepaid plan (together with the USB based mobile modem stick), so any foreign citizen may also get it for in-land use.

GSM coverage is very good, while EDGE and UMTS coverage is rather sparse, as of January 2010 and the usage for higher speeds is only possible on certain, mainly urban locations and in the Adriatic Sea area.

=== Digital Subscriber Line (DSL) ===
In Croatia ADSL was introduced in 2000 by the German owned operator T-Com, formerly HT (Hrvatski Telekom, meaning Croatian telecom). DSL is the most common form of broadband. Flat-rate based plans are the most commonly used in conjunction with DSL. There are companies offering ADSL2+ Internet Access and TriplePlay. Local loops were expected to be unbundled after September 2006. As of 2010, this has only partially been done. ADSL and fixed line phones use the same cable plant in most parts of the country, in some locations the line quality is not good enough to support a stable ADSL link, and in some locations there is no ADSL supporting telephone switch installed.

The list of DSL providers in Croatia is:

- Hrvatski Telekom (owned by Deutsche Telekom) - MAXadsl, with a TriplePlay plan MaxTV, nationwide
- Iskon Internet (owned by HT) - part of the network is locally based (in major urban areas), and partly services are run by local loop over T-Com copper lines, TriplePlay plan Iskon.TV, but only on the local part of the network for now.
- Vipnet d.o.o. (owned by Vip Telekom Austria Group)
- Optima Telekom d.d. - part of the network is locally based (in major urban areas), and partly services are run by local loop over T-Com copper lines, TriplePlay plan is called OptiTV. The reach for TriplePlay is extended gradually.
- Transintercom d.o.o.
- Magic Telekom d.o.o.
- H1 Telekom d.d.

=== WiMax ===
The oldest commercial WiMax provider is: Novi net d.o.o.

WIMAX concessions were also given to Optima Telekom, WIMAX Telecom and Odašiljači i veze d.d. (OiV). However, none of them has to the present day (as of January 2010) realized the full potential of their concession, due to the high cost of the infrastructure which needs to be built. Also, the providers claim that there are not yet enough potential interested users for this technology.

=== Cable Internet ===
Cable Internet is available, but it is not as widespread as ADSL. There is one Cable Internet provider in Croatia, Vipnet d.o.o., also with a TriplePlay offer.

=== National research and education network ===
CARNET is the national research and education network and a significant Internet provider for numerous end-users in the academic and educational community in Croatia.

=== Dial-up Internet ===
The dial-up Internet penetration in Croatia is still high, mainly in rural areas. This is due to the high penetration rate for fixed line telephones throughout country. There are several providers which also offer this rather old connection method:

- T-Com Croatia - dial-up plans exist
- Iskon Internet - the Iskon.Dial-Up service enables classic dial-up access, with several plans.
- VIPnet - their Homebox + offer includes which they designate as "fixed line", but technically uses GSM has the plan which also offers Internet access. Also, the VIP online plan exists using classic modem lines.
- Optima Telekom - OptiNET Dial-Up service
- Globalnet - dial-up unified login data, also possible for usage by foreigners
- There are also some smaller dial-up providers.

=== Wireless LAN hotspots ===
Some Wireless LAN (WLAN) hotspots exist in Internet cafés and some cities.

There are also many volunteer-driven WLAN local-city networks, for example:

- DJWireless (Đakovo),
- OSWirless (Osijek),
- TENG (Nova Gradiška), and
- some others.

They usually serve a small number of local users. VIPnet and Iskon Internet operate some hotspots commercially.

=== Satellite Internet ===
In the past, there were a few resellers of one-way satellite Internet services, which mostly ceased to exist with the arrival of increased ADSL coverage and reduced interest in the service. Currently (as of 2010), there is at least one reseller of a two-way satellite Internet service. However, this method of Internet access is not economically viable, except for a very few very remote areas. The equipment needed is not subsidized, unlike ADSL and FTTH trial equipment.

When Croatia joined the European Union in the year 2013, it became an integral part of the agenda to close the digital divide. According to official data, satellite Internet coverage at the end of 2013 was 94%.

=== Commercial fiber ===
In Croatia there are various commercial fiber providers. Some of them:

- Omonia

== Internet censorship and surveillance ==
There is no OpenNet Initiative country profile for Croatia, but there is little to no evidence of Internet filtering in all areas (political, social, conflict/security, and Internet tools) on the ONI global Internet filtering maps.

The constitution and law generally provide for freedom of speech and press; however, growing economic pressures lead journalists to practice self-censorship. Hate speech committed over the Internet is punishable by six months to three years of imprisonment and libel is a criminal offense, but these laws are generally not enforced. There are no government restrictions on access to the Internet or reports that the government monitors e-mail or Internet chat rooms. Individuals and groups generally engage in the peaceful expression of views via the Internet. Internet access is widely available and used by citizens throughout the country.

== Web browsers ==
As of 2024, most used web browsers according to Statcounter were:

Web browser	Market share	Reference
Chrome	71%	
Safari	11%	
Firefox	5.6%	
Samsung Internet	4.4%	
Edge	3.5%	
Opera	2.5%	
Explorer	0.20%	
Instabridge	0.19%	
Android	0.15%	
other	0.27%	

As of 2024, most used web browsers according to Cloudflare were:

Web browser	Market share	Reference
Chrome	73%	
Safari	8.5%	
Samsung Internet	6.0%	
Firefox	5.3%	
Edge	3.3%	
Opera	1.3%	
Brave	1.0%	
Huawei Browser	0.31%	
DuckDuckGo Private Browser	0.18%	
Mi Browser	0.13%	
Avast Secure Browser	0.07%	

== See also ==
- Telecommunications in Croatia
- Media of Croatia
