= Faktograf.hr =

Croatian fact-checking website

- Website type: Fact-checking
- Available in: Croatian
- Creators: Petar Vidov; Sanja Despot; Ana Brakus; Gabrijela Galić; Ana Benačić
- Founders: Croatian Journalists' Association; GONG
- Editor: Petar Vidov
- Website: faktograf.hr
- Registration: none
- Launched: 2015; 11 years ago
- Content license: Creative Commons 2.0

Faktograf.hr is a Croatian fact-checking website set up in 2015 by the Croatian Journalists' Association and GONG. It is a member of the International Fact Checking Network and, since April 2019, part of Facebook's Third Party Fact Checking program. As of 2019, it is the only media organization in Croatia specialized in fact checking.

Faktograf.hr rates the accuracy of statements of Croatian public figures and media on a five-grade scale: Fakt ("Fact"), Tri kvarta fakta ("Three quarters of a fact"), Polufakt ("Half-fact"), Ni pola fakta ("Less than half of a fact"), and Ni F od fakta ("Not a fact").

== History ==
In 2019, Faktograf partnered with Facebook as one of their European factcheckers. In May 2019 Faktograf, together with 18 other Fact-checking organizations, joined the International Fact-Checking Network's FactCheckEU, which provided factchecks on the European Union (EU) and on statements by European political figures. It also exposed hoaxes related to the EU elections. In December 2019, Faktograf uncovered the fact that the Croatian Ministry of Economy, Entrepreneurship and Crafts had used money from EU subsidies to approve a grant of €13,200 [the equivalent of $14,500] for the portal Dnevno.hr, which had been proven to having repeatedly shared misinformation about the EU, spread fake news and even hate speech.

In 2020, during the COVID-19 pandemic, Faktograf was falsely accused by social media users, online platforms and websites in Croatia, of "effectively censoring their opinions" shared on Facebook, when they were purely marking inaccurate content and misinformation and the decision whether to remove such content remained entirely with Facebook. In June 2020, Faktograf, together with several other southeast European organizations, founded SEE Check, a fact-checking network to expose viral COVID-19 misinformation in Southeast Europe, as well as a related Viber community group, Twitter account and Facebook page.
