= Ivana Radaljac Krušlin =

Croatian journalist

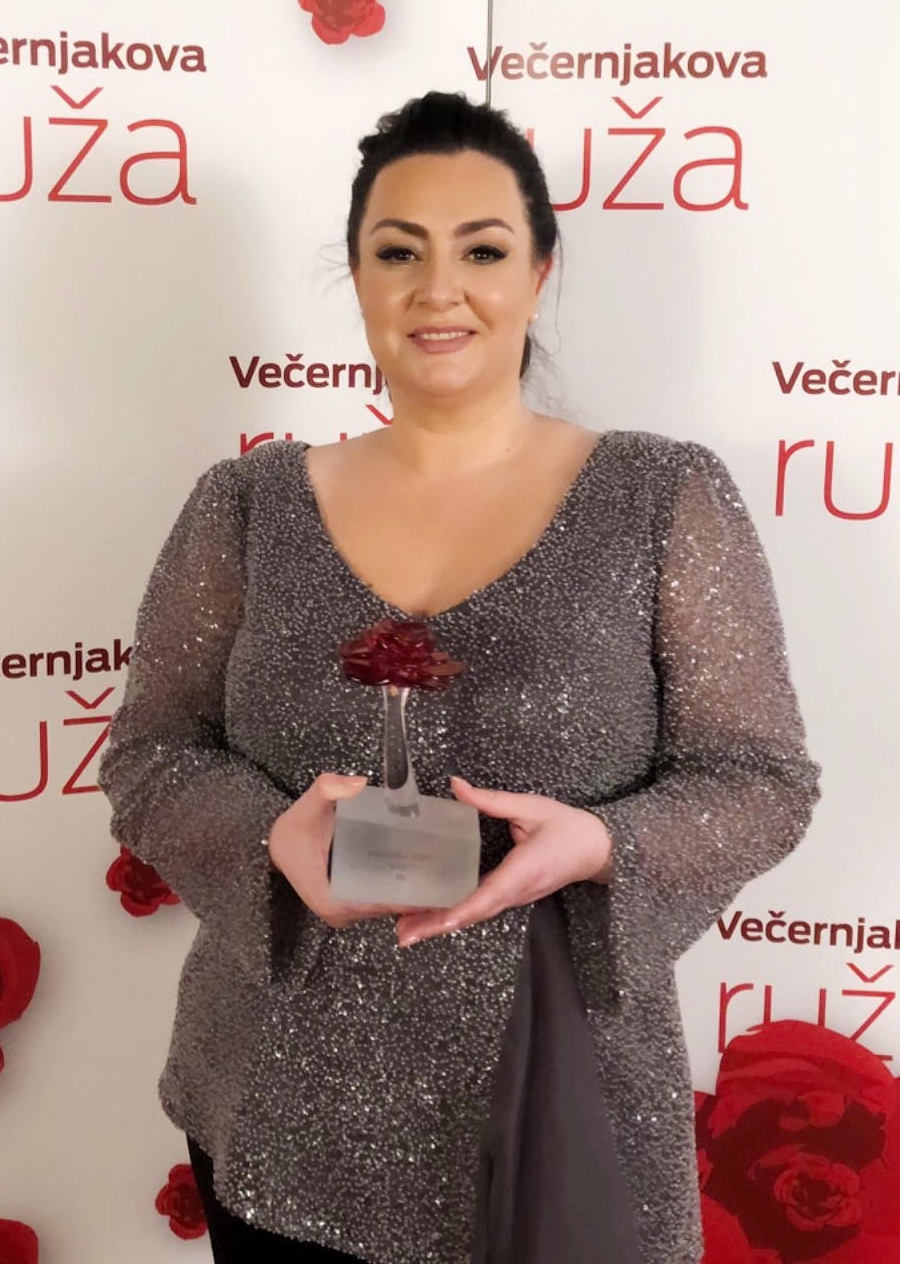
Ivana Radaljac Krušlin- Večernjakova ruža

Ivana Radaljac Krušlin (May 22, 1975) is a Croatian journalist, anchorwoman and radio host. She is best known for her work at Croatian Radiotelevision, in the program of Croatian Radio, Radio Sljeme.

== Biography ==
Ivana Radaljac Krušlin was born in Metković and studied at the Faculty of Law in Zagreb and later graduated from the Faculty of Political Science in Zagreb. During the period from 1993. to 1994., she worked in the Croatian Ministry of the Interior Affairs and as a journalist and anchorwoman at the local radio station Radio Station Ploče and Neretva Television. Her serious career began at the Croatian Radiotelevision in 1994. as part of the Croatian Television.

Ivana Radaljac Krušlin switched from television to Croatian Radio, Radio Sljeme where, in addition to the regular daily program, she still works on major projects such as the annual ski competition Snježna Kraljica- Snow Queen Trophy, she organized the project "55 years of Radio Sljeme" (2008), she was also a reporter for a project "Postcards from Croatia" (2008), and the media organizer and reporter of the 2009 World Handball Championship and many others.

Ivana Radaljac Krušlin is known for her work in encouraging public awareness and organizations to focus on social problems, where she deals with socially marginalized and vulnerable groups in Croatian society. Some of her projects that deal with mentioned issues are Deveti krug, Psiholog(i)ja, and a series of documentaries Žena, kurva kraljica, Dom na kraju svijeta, Svijet za šut and Dema, devla for which the Croatian Journalists' Association awarded her the Marija Jurić Zagorka award in 2012.

She is a member of the Multidisciplinary Team for Child Protection of the Regional Departmental Center for Child Protection in Southeast Europe and the Social Council of the City of Zagreb. She is also a member of the Press Council of Honor, where she holds the position of one of judges of the Court of Honor in her second term.

Ivana Radaljac Krušlin is the host and editor-in-chief of the YouTube podcast "PSIHOLOGiJA", a long-running radio show about mental health. In 2024, the podcast was nominated for Večernjakova ruža award in the category "radio show of the year" for the year 2023.

== Awards ==
As part of her media career, Ivana Radaljac Krušlin has won several awards, some of which are:

Award of the Croatian Journalists' Association- for radio journalism, 2012.

AVA Digital Awards, Dallas, SAD 2020.

Večernjakova ruža 2020 edition- radio person of the year, 2020.

Finalist of the Communicator of the Year- 2020 election.

Award of the Croatian Public Relations Association, Marija Jurić Zagorka for radio journalism, 2020.

New York Radio Festivals, 2021.

== Personal life ==
She is married to a Croatian singer, composer and songwriter Željko Krušlin Kruška.
