= PC Chip =

- Editor-in-chief: Jasmin Redžepagić
- Categories: Computer magazine
- Frequency: Monthly
- Founded: 1995
- Company: A1 Video d.o.o.
- Country: Croatia
- Based in: Zagreb
- Language: Croatian
- Website: PC Chip
- ISSN: 1331-0542

PC Chip is a monthly Croatian computer magazine. It is one of three general computer magazines published in Croatia, along with its main competitors BUG and Vidi. The magazine is published by company A1 video d.o.o., which is also maintaining website pcchip.hr. The magazine has its headquarters in Zagreb and is also sold in Bosnia and Herzegovina, Slovenia, Serbia, but "digital sample" (pdf) is available to anybody with internet connection.

PC Chip has 194 pages and was redesigned in April 2008 (Issue 155). In November 2011, issue number 198 was published.

== Article themes ==
First few pages in every issue is usually filled with columns and various IT news, previews, and press conference reports.

=== Hardver ===
As name suggests, this subsection covers reviews of various types of personal computer hardware. Anything that can be connected to computer is candidate for review in this section. New desktop computer parts, laptops, monitors, printers, peripherals, tablet computers, photo and video equipment, various gadgets, and other equipment that is available in Croatia are often reviewed in this subsection. Hardware editor is Slaven Pintarić.

=== Softver ===
Most PC Chip readers use Microsoft Windows operating system, so most software reviews in this subsection is aimed at Microsoft users. Linux and macOS users also get some attention, with focus on freeware and free software.

=== Helpdesk ===
This subsection is filled with various tutorials, how-to's, tips & tricks, and answers to reader's mails.

=== other ===
Few pages in every issue is usually occupied by various themes ranging anything from science fiction and computer history to business interviews, large press reports or off topic themes. 2 or 3 pages are reserved for games.

=== Moby ===
Former standalone magazine is now merged with PC Chip and usually, last 10 - 15 pages are reserved for this section. It covers new mobile phone and smartphone reviews, but also other equipment, mobile software, and known issues.
