= Gameplay (disambiguation) =

Gameplay refers to the way a player interacts with a game.

Gameplay may also refer to:

- GamePlay (magazine), a Croatian video game magazine published from 2002 to 2011
- Gameplay (magazine), a Ukrainian video game magazine published from 2005 to 2010
- Emergent gameplay
- GamePlay, a chain of video arcades located inside Walmart
