= SRCE =

SRCE or Srce may refer to:

- University Computing Centre, an institution in Zagreb, Croatia
- Serbia Centre, a political party in Serbia
