= Telecommunications in Croatia =

Telecommunications in Croatia covers fixed and mobile telephones, radio, television, and the Internet.

== Telephones ==
1. Main lines in use: 1.9 million (2009; 17 years ago).
2. Mobile cellular: 6.0 million (2009; 17 years ago).
3. Mobile operators:
  1. Hrvatski Telekom (prefixes +38598, +38599; GSM 900 MHz and 1800 MHz, UMTS 2100 MHz and 900 MHz, LTE 800 MHz and 1800 MHz, 2,273,000 users as at December 2018; 7 years ago)
  2. A1 (prefix +38591; GSM 900 MHz and 1800 MHz, UMTS 2100 MHz and 900 MHz, LTE 800 MHz, 1800 MHz and 2600 MHz, 2,100,000 users)
  3. Telemach (prefix +38595; GSM 1800 MHz, UMTS 2100 MHz and 900 MHz, 897,000 users at the end of 2018; 8 years ago)
4. Mobile virtual network operator:
  1. bonbon (prefix +385977 and +385976; uses Hrvatski Telekom's network)
  2. Tomato (prefix +38592; uses A1's network)
5. Telephone system (2015; 11 years ago):
  1. domestic:
    1. all local lines are digital;
    2. main operator: Hrvatski Telekom (owned by Deutsche Telekom);
    3. other operators: Iskon, Optima Telekom.
  2. international:
    1. country code - +385
    2. digital international service is provided through the main switch in Zagreb;
    3. Croatia participates in the Trans-Asia-Europe (TEL) fiber-optic project, which consists of two fiber-optic trunk connections with Slovenia and a fiber-optic trunk line from Rijeka to Split and Dubrovnik;
  3. Croatia is also investing in ADRIA 1, a joint fiber-optic project with Germany, Albania, and Greece.

== Radio and television ==
1. Radio broadcast stations: FM 152 (January 2026; 8 months ago).
2. Television free-to-air terrestrial stations: 28 (January 2026; 8 months ago).

== Internet ==
1. Top-level domain: .hr, administered by the Croatian Academic and Research Network (CARNET).
2. Internet users:
  1. 2.8 million users, 80th in the world; 63.0% of the population, 59th in the world (2012; 14 years ago);
  2. 2.2 million users (2009; 17 years ago).
3. Fixed broadband: 909,090 subscriptions, 58th in the world; 20.3% of the population, 48th in the world (2012; 14 years ago).
4. Wireless broadband: 2.3 million subscribers, 60th in the world; 52.3% of the population, 26th in the world (2012; 14 years ago).
5. Internet hosts: 729,420 hosts, 50th in the world (2012; 14 years ago).
6. IPv4: 2.0 million addresses allocated, less than 0.05% of the world total, 455.9 addresses per 1000 people (2012; 14 years ago).
7. Internet service providers (ISPs): 41 (2006; 20 years ago).

== See also ==
- List of radio stations in Croatia
