= Jasenovac i Gradiška Stara =

Pro-Ustaše fascist Croatian song

Jasenovac i Gradiška Stara (transl. Jasenovac and Stara Gradiška) is a Croatian song promoting the Ustaše massacres in World War II. The lyrics celebrate the holocaust in Croatia and genocide of Serbs at the Jasenovac and Stara Gradiška concentration camps and in Herzegovina. The original author of the song is unknown.

== Lyrics ==
Lyrics in Croatian	Lyrics in English
Jasenovac i Gradiška Stara, to je kuća Maksovih mesara.	Jasenovac and Stara Gradiška, that is the house of Max's butchers
Kroz Imotski kamioni žure, voze crnce Francetića Jure.	Through Imotski trucks are rushing, they are driving the Legion of Jure Francetić
U Čapljini, klaonica bila, puno Srba Neretva nosila.	In Čapljina there was a slaughterhouse, many Serbs were carried away by Neretva
Oj Neretvo teci niza stranu, nosi Srbe plavome Jadranu.	Hey, Neretva, flow downhill, carry the Serbs into the blue Adriatic.
Ko je moga zamisliti lani, da će Božić slavit partizani.	Last year who would have thought, that the Partisans would be celebrating Christmas
Tko je reka, jeba li ga ćaća, da se Crna Legija ne vraća.	Fuck him who said that the Black Legion would not return
Gospe sinjska ako si u stanju, uzmi Stipu, a vrati nam Franju.	Our Lady of Sinj if you are able, take Stipe and give us back Franjo.
Oj Račane jeba ti pas mater, i onome tko je glasa za te.	Oh Račan, fuck you, and whoever voted for you.
Sjajna zvijezdo iznad Metkovića, pozdravi nam Antu Pavelića.	Shining star above Metković, greet for us Ante Pavelić.

== Controversies ==
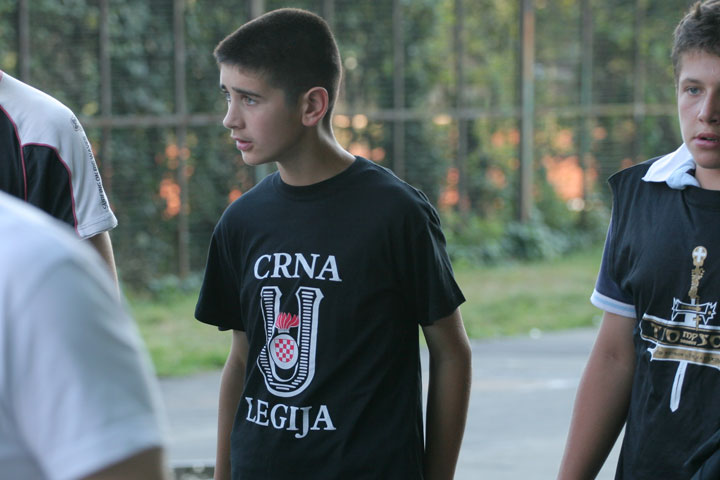
Young boy wearing a shirt with a Black Legion, Ustaše Militia sign at Thompson's concert in 2007

In December 2003, Matija Babić and Neven Baraković, journalists of Croatian left-leaning tabloid Index.hr, published an article in which they claimed to have found an internet audio recording of the Croatian singer-songwriter Marko Perković Thompson performing the song, and criticized Croatian Radiotelevision (HRT), Croatia Records and other media for continuing to cover Thompson as a mainstream artist. The Jerusalem Post also reported in 2007 that Thompson had performed the song two years earlier.

According to Index.hr, Perković first denied and then acknowledged on his official website in 2004 that he had performed the song. He later again denied performing the song, claiming that it was a montage made and shared by Croatian journalists Denis Latin and Aleksandar Stanković from Croatian Radio Television, and part of a wider conspiracy by the Yugoslav State Security Service (UDBA). A court case against Latin and Stanković was subsequently dismissed due to a statute of limitations. In a 2020 interview for the German daily Frankfurter Allgemeine Zeitung, Perković condemned the song, stating that it was "completely contrary to my worldview and the ideology I belong to. Being associated with that song is offensive to me" and that its lyrics are "disgusting".
