= TasteAtlas =

Experiential travel guide for food

- TasteAtlas logo
- Website type: Food Guide
- Available in: English
- Founded: 2018
- Headquarters: Zagreb, Croatia
- Founder: Matija Babić
- Website: tasteatlas.com

TasteAtlas is an experiential travel online guide for traditional food that collates authentic recipes, food critic reviews, and research articles about popular ingredients and dishes. It features an interactive global food map with dish icons shown in their respective regions and purportedly contains nearly 10,000 dishes, drinks, and ingredients, as well as 9,000 restaurants.

== History ==
Founded in 2015 by Croatian journalist and entrepreneur Matija Babić, it took more than three years of research and development before the project launched in late 2018. The site was still in the MVP phase in early 2018 with about 5,000 dishes included. It received an honorable mention in 2018 Awwwards.

The company does not intend to compete with the likes of Michelin Guide or Tripadvisor, as it sees its niche between haute cuisine recommendations of the former and popular tourist places of the latter, none of which focus on traditional dishes. The site uses reviews and recommendations from gastronomy professionals and critics reviews instead of user-generated content, citing trustworthiness as the main reason. It is a recommended curriculum resource in several education systems, such as in Ireland and Kansas.

== Traditional dishes ==
To fulfill its mission of preserving traditional recipes and promoting authentic restaurants and source ingredients, a small team of 30 authors does rigorous research. This is reportedly done using all available sources and criteria, including article mentions, reviews, Google Search popularity as well as relevant certificates, such as EU food schemes, Unesco Intangible Cultural Heritage, and Ark of Taste.

The database includes famous dishes such as cheeseburger, sandwich, taco, Irish breakfast, and ceviche but it also features less known and more regional ones, such as kare-kare, fabada, and khachpuri.

=== Maps, lists, and awards ===
TasteAtlas produces various infographic maps to showcase an in-depth look at different cuisines and local foods, as well as numerous top lists or certain dishes and regions.

The site hands out TasteAtlas Awards for categories like "Best Traditional Dish," (won by Picanha for 2023, 2024) "Best Cuisine," "Best Traditional Food City" and others.

=== Issues ===
Many issues, reportedly, come from dishes contested between multiple countries and similar dishes with several regional names. In the case of the lack of any trustworthy information, the dish is not included on the site.
