= Combis =

COMBIS
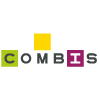
- Type: Limited Liability Company
- Founded: 1990
- Headquarters: Radnička cesta 21, Zagreb, Croatia
- Area served: Primarily Southeast Europe
- Key people: Dean Krušić (CEO)
- Services: Integration of information technologies
- Owner: Hrvatski Telekom d.d. (100%)
- Number of employees: 366 (2018)
- Website: www.combis.hr/en

COMBIS is a Croatian business-to-business information and communications technology services company. The company operates throughout Southeast Europe as an independent company wholly owned by Hrvatski Telekom, with headquarters in Zagreb.

== History ==
Founded in 1990 in Dubrovnik, in 2010 COMBIS became a member of T-HT Group, Deutsche Telekom Group, which created a wide range of integrated IT-telecommunications business solutions and services on the market of Croatia. From a small company, COMBIS has developed into a regional company, with daughter companies in Bosnia and Herzegovina and Serbia.

In 2014 Combis was the largest IT company in Croatia by revenue excluding distributors and retailers.

== Partnerships ==
Combis has long-term partnerships with corporations such as IBM, Cisco, Microsoft, Dell, Oracle, Hewlett Packard, Broadsoft, VMware, Veeam, Lenovo, Lexmark, Palo Alto Networks, Red Hat, Fortinet, Fireeye, Trend Micro, Sophos, Unify,...

== Locations ==
Combis has eight service locations in Croatia, in Zagreb, Split, Rijeka, Zadar, Varaždin and Dubrovnik. It is present in Bosnia and Hercegovina, with headquarters in Sarajevo, and three service locations, in Banja Luka, Tuzla and Mostar, and in Serbia, with headquarters in Beograd. Belgrade.
