= Glas Istre =

Croatian regional daily newspaper

- Type: Regional daily newspaper
- Publisher: Glas Istre novine d.o.o.
- Editor-in-chief: Ranko Borovečki
- Founded: 18 August 1943
- Language: Croatian
- Headquarters: Riva 10, Pula, Croatia
- Website: www.glasistre.hr

Glas Istre (lit. 'Voice of Istria') is a Croatian regional daily newspaper published in Pula which mainly covers stories of interest from the Istria region in the northwest of the country. Established in 1943 as a regional newsletter of the Yugoslav Partisans, the paper continued to be published after World War II, and became a daily in November 1969.

The paper spent the majority of its later history as a regional supplement published in the Rijeka-based nationally circulated newspaper Novi list, and between 1979 and 1991 the editor-in-chief of Novi list was also in charge of Glas Istre. In the 1990s the paper became increasingly independent of its parent publication and eventually evolved into a separate regional daily.

== History ==
Originally launched in July 1943 as the publication of the People’s Liberation Front for Istria. Founded by the Yugoslav Partisans, its first issue was printed near Crikvenica as an anti-fascist paper for the people of Istria. Over the years it appeared as a monthly, weekly, and biweekly, and since 1969 it has been published daily. Since April 1989 it also appears on Sundays.

== See also ==
- List of newspapers in Croatia
