= Iskon Internet =

ICT company in Zagreb, Croatia

- Company type: public company (dioničko društvo)
- Industry: Fixed telephony, Broadband
- Founded: 1997
- Headquarters: Garićgradska 18, Zagreb, Croatia
- Key people: Kresimir Madunović (CEO), Vedran Žitnjak (CTO), Josip Pranjić (CFO)
- Products: ADSL2+, Dial-up, WiMAX, VPN, Carrier Pre Selection, PSTN, POTS, Centrex, IPTV
- Website: www.iskon.hr

Iskon Internet was an ICT company with headquarters in Zagreb, Croatia. Other than being an Internet provider, Iskon provides fixed line telephone and IPTV access, thus offering full triple play service.

In 2006 Iskon was bought by T-HT and became part of Deutsche Telekom group, but retained its own company structure and brand image. On January 1, 2024, Iskon Internet d.d. was officially merged with Hrvatski Telekom, and a separate brand name "Iskon" remains.

== History ==
Iskon was founded in Čakovec in 1997 in home of Damir Sabol. Around the end of 1999, American company Adriatic Net Investors invested considerable funds in Iskon, changing the ownership structure of the company and moving its headquarters to Zagreb. In 2000, Iskon was additionally consolidated through foreign investment from Dresdener Kleinwort Benson Private Equity. In 2001, Iskon acquired Klik Multimedia company and launched its own web portal, which soon became the most visited portal in Croatian webspace. In May 2006, Iskon was bought by T-HT (which itself is part of Deutsche Telekom). Iskon's web portal (renamed net.hr) was singled out as an independent company before the purchase and thus avoided the takeover. The acquisition proved successful, since Iskon continued to function independently as a company providing broadband services under its own brand, transforming from a small family business into a company with more than 160 full-time employees.

== Services and availability ==
Iskon brand is available though its own ULL infrastructure in following Croatian cities: Zagreb, Split, Dubrovnik, Rijeka, Pula, Osijek, Velika Gorica, Samobor, Opatija and Solin. It is also available in the rest of Croatia via T-com's infrastructure (bitstream).

Other than being a broadband Internet provider, Iskon also offers IPTV and fixed-line telephony, both for private and business clients (with special emphasis towards SME).

In 2011, Iskon was the first company in Croatia to offer its customers a service to watch live TV on their mobile devices.

In collaboration with CARNET (Croatian Academic and Research Network), Iskon offers discounted prices for its services to all Croatian pupils, students and faculty members.

== Sponsorships ==
Since 2001. Iskon is a sponsor and official Internet provider of Croatian Football Federation. It also sponsors Croatian table tennis club Mladost Iskon, ATP Zagreb Indoors and Zagreb Open tennis tournaments, and Motovun Film Festival.
