= Đuro Deželić =

Croatian writer and politician

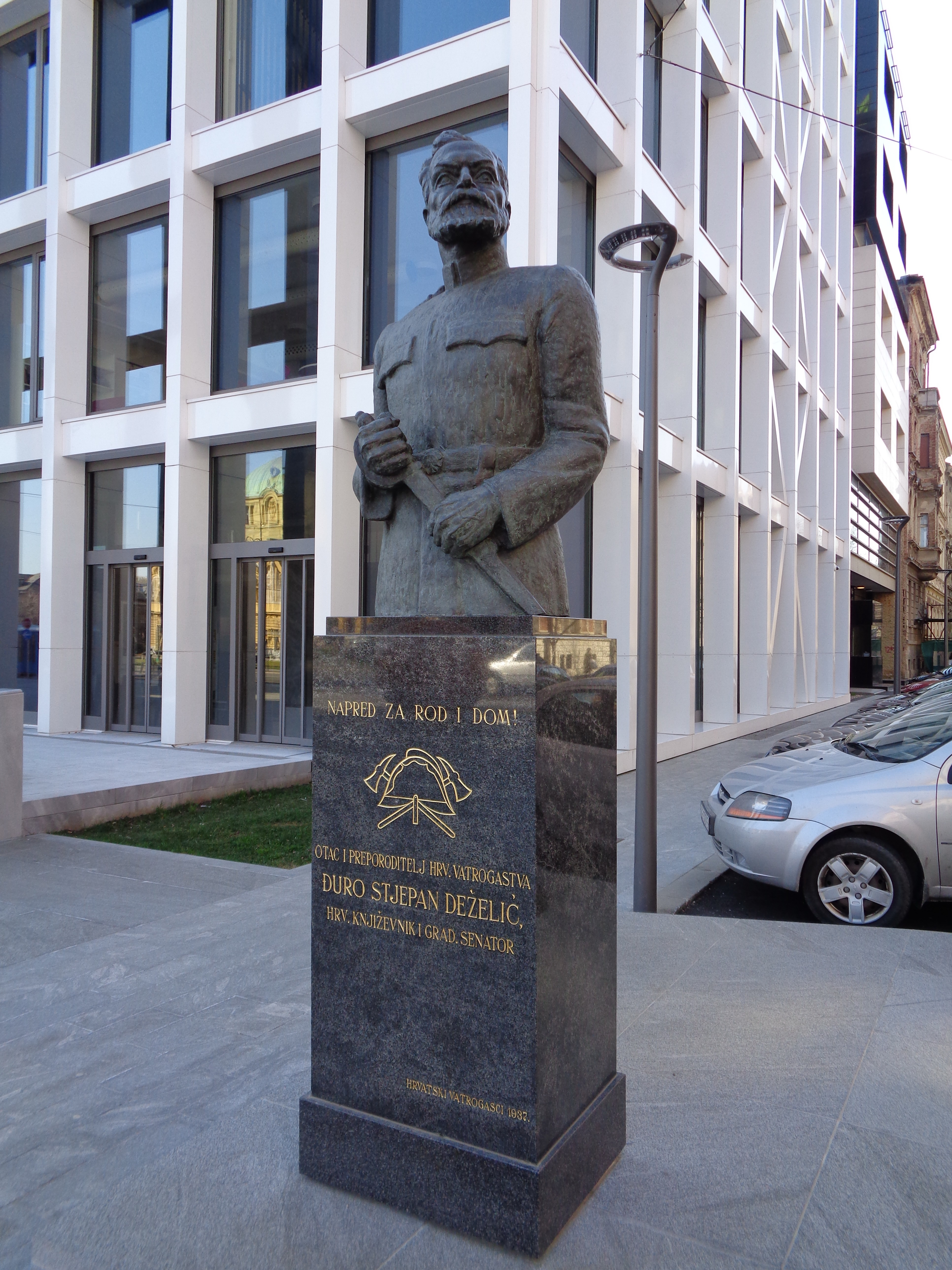
Monument in Zagreb

Đuro Deželić (25 March 1838 – 28 October 1907) was a Croatian writer.

Deželić was born in Ivanić-Grad. After finishing law school at the University of Zagreb, he soon became involved with the city's municipal government. From 1871 until his death he served as a member of the Zagreb city council and deputy mayor of Zagreb. In 1868 he established the Croatian firefighting service. Politically, he considered himself a Unionist until 1873, but in later years he shifted closer to the Party of Rights.

He was also editor of Narodne novine (1862-1864) and Danica (1863-1864) newspapers, and was the first editor of magazines Domobran (1864) and Vienac (1869). He also wrote historical and philosophical essays, political articles, poetry, short stories, novels, travel literature and biographies of notable Croats. His contemporaries were especially fond of his popular history articles dealing with Croatian history. Deželić died in Zagreb.

== Sources ==
- Umro Gjuro Deželić (in Croatian)
