= Matija Babić =

Croatian journalist and entrepreneur

- Born: 1978 (age 47–48); Zagreb, SR Croatia, SFR Yugoslavia
- Education: University of Zagreb
- Occupations: Journalist; entrepreneur
- Known for: Founder of Index.hr; former chief editor of 24sata; founder of TasteAtlas

Matija Babić (born 1978) is a Croatian journalist and entrepreneur best known for being the former editor-in-chief of the Croatian news website Index.hr.

== Biography ==
As a student of University of Zagreb's Faculty of Political Sciences, Babić began his career in the media in the late 1990s when he launched political news websites Vlast.net and Izbori.net. This caught attention of Globalnet, one of the pioneering Croatian Internet service providers, who hired him as editor of their web portal Online.hr. Although the portal managed to attract more readership during his tenure, the portal's parent company decided to cease funding the portal in late 2001 and in December 2002 Babić left Online.hr to found Index.hr, one of the first Croatian Internet-only news outlets.

Initially designed as a news aggregator, Index.hr provided news content from both Croatia and all around the world. The website quickly gained popularity in the early 2000s and over time more original content produced by the growing staff was being added to the site, until it became a popular media outlet in its own right. Around the same time the website gained a reputation for yellow journalism after exposing a series of scandals, the two most notable being the 2003 controversy stirred by a discovered recording of popular singer Marko Perković in which Perković publicly performed "Jasenovac i Gradiška Stara", a song praising the WWII fascist Ustaše regime, and the 2004 celebrity sex tape scandal involving Severina Vučković, a pop singer. Babić's website was sued by Vučković for copyright infringement and breach of privacy. In 2004 part of the lawsuit about intellectual property was dismissed by the court, but was approved violation of privacy with a compensation of 100,000 kuna.

On account of the Index.hr website's success, the South Austrian-based publisher Styria Medien AG (who owned Večernji list, one of the most widely circulated daily newspapers in the country) had hired Babić as editor-in-chief of 24sata, a new tabloid newspaper which was intended to target "young, urban and modern" readers. Babić left Index.hr and joined 24sata which was launched in March 2005 and soon established itself as Croatia's third daily newspaper in terms of circulation, behind Jutarnji list and Večernji list. However, it was also criticized for sensationalism and poor quality of writing, and Babić was sacked only four months later in July 2005, following an issue which featured a cover page with then Prime Minister Ivo Sanader and the headline "Everybody Hates Sanader". Babić then returned to Index.hr and continued to run the website for a while, holding the title of "author and editor of the project".

In 2015, he was convicted of tax evasion, causing damages that amounted to 2.8 million kunas and was sentenced to a year in prison. This was eventually exchanged for community service as part of a plea bargain.

He has since left, and is no longer performing any functions at Index.hr. According to his colleague and former employee, Ilko Ćimić, Babić has moved from Croatia and resides in Bulgaria.
