= Splitska Televizija =

Splitska Televizija (STV) is a defunct Croatian commercial television station that operated in the city of Split, and was also available through MaxTV system in all other parts of Croatia.

The station was founded in 1999 and received broadcasting license for the city of Split via cable. In October this year STV has joined MaxTV and has approached its audience through the video website www.splitskatelevizija.hr. The program consisted of various informative, educational, business and entertainment shows locally oriented. The station ceased broadcast in 2010.
