= Zarez =

- Editor in Chief: Marija Ćaćić
- Categories: Arts, Culture, Current affairs
- Frequency: Biweekly
- Publisher: Druga strana d.o.o.
- First issue: 19 February 1999
- Company: Druga strana d.o.o.
- Country: Croatia
- Based in: Zagreb
- Language: Croatian
- Website: zarez.abcdnk.hr
- ISSN: 1331-7970

Zarez (English: The Comma) was a Croatian biweekly newsprint magazine covering literature, arts, culture and current affairs.

== History and profile ==
Zarez was established in 1999 after a group of intellectuals decided to break away from the government-favored cultural magazine Vijenac because of differences of editorial policies proscribed by Matica hrvatska, the publisher of Vijenac, and the views of the editorial staff. They formed a company called Druga strana (The other side) and started a new, independent, cultural magazine first published on 19 February 1999. Even though it is widely considered to be one of the best cultural publications in Croatia, it always struggled to secure its finances because of low circulations of culture-oriented publications in the country. It is currently financed by the Croatian Ministry of Culture and the City of Zagreb.

== See also ==
- List of magazines in Croatia
