= Vijenac =

- Cover of the 28 February 2008 issue
- Editor: Goran Galić
- Categories: Literature, Arts, Science
- Frequency: Biweekly
- Circulation: 7,000 (2013)
- Publisher: Miro Gavran
- First issue: December 1993
- Company: Matica hrvatska
- Country: Croatia
- Based in: Zagreb
- Language: Croatian
- Website: www.matica.hr/vijenac
- ISSN: 1330-2787

Vijenac (English: The Wreath) is a biweekly magazine for literature, art and science, established in December 1993 and published by Matica hrvatska, the central national cultural institution in Croatia.

== Historical background ==
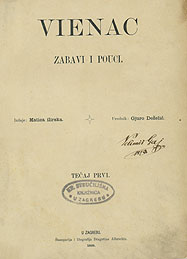
First edition cover page, 1869

The magazine is seen as the direct descendant of the Vienac literary magazine, which gathered the best Croatian writers and poets of the second half of the 19th century. It was created in 1869 to "delight and educate" (zabavi i pouci). Prominent cultural figures were editors-in-chief. In the first year, the magazine was managed by Đuro Deželić, then by Ivan Perkovac, Milivoj Dežman, Franjo Marković and Vjekoslav Klaić.

Vienac soon became the main Croatian literary magazine of the second half of the 19th century, especially when it was managed by the greatest Croatian writer of the time, August Šenoa, from 1874 until his death in 1881. It is a showcase of the big literary names of the period. For example, Ksaver Šandor Gjalski published his first short story there in 1884. Vijenac also published translations of works by Zola, Daudet and Turgenev. From 1890 to 1896, it was edited by Josip Pasarić, a major critic of Croatian realism.

Both the content and the illustrations were on the level of the contemporary European literary magazines. Vienac was the only edition of Matica ilirska (the Illyrian Matrix) until Matica was restructured in 1874 to become the Matica hrvatska. After that, Vienac was published by a printing company. It died out in 1903.

== Vijenac today ==
After its revival in 1993, Vijenac soon regained its prestige status as a prominent literary and arts publication. However, in late 1998 a group of top contributors (including the then editor-in-chief, Andrea Zlatar) left Vijenac and established Zarez. Vijenac continued publishing with a new editorial staff. As of 2013 it had an estimated circulation of 7,000 copies.

== See also ==
- List of magazines in Croatia
