= Index.hr =

Croatian online newspaper

- Website type: Online newspaper Tabloid
- Available in: Croatian
- Creator: Matija Babić
- Website: www.index.hr
- Commercial: Yes
- Registration: Required for some services
- Launched: 10 December 2002; 23 years ago
- Current status: Online

Index.hr is a Croatian tabloid-like online newspaper, launched in December 2002 and based in Zagreb. It was founded by Matija Babić and was originally designed as a news aggregation website, providing news content from Croatia, Bosnia and Herzegovina, Serbia, and Slovenia. The website quickly grew in popularity and over time, more original content was produced by its growing staff until it became a popular media outlet in its own right. It has been described as having a "reputation of an independent, liberal, and strongly opposition outlet" with a "strong liberal bias". According to a 2023 report from the Ministry of Culture's Ownership and Media Funding platform, Index.hr is one of the few media outlets in Croatia that received no state subsidies or public advertising, either from national, regional or local government bodies, or from state-owned enterprises.

The news site covers politics, business, sports, show business, and features columns covering everything from gossip to political commentary. According to Alexa Internet in 2010, Index.hr is one of the top sites in Croatia, and in Bosnia and Herzegovina. As of 2018, it is the leading Croatian news website. Despite its popularity however, it is among the least trusted Croatian news brands.

== Relevance and public opinion ==
Index.hr has often had a polarizing effect on Croatian society. This is also reflected in the Reuters survey on media trust, where Index ranks first among digital-only outlets, with 46% of citizens expressing trust in the outlet. At the same time, with 29% of citizens expressing distrust, Index also tops the list of least trusted digital media.

== Index Investigations ==
Since 2004, Index.hr has exposed a number of major scandals that led to the resignation of seven government ministers across various administrations.

In 2014, Index exposed the biggest corruption scandal involving the then ruling Social Democratic Party (SDP). The reporting led to the dismissal and expulsion of finance minister Slavko Linić, the resignation of his deputy Branko Šegon, and Tihomir Kralj leaving the Tax Administration.

In 2018, through a series of articles, Index uncovered email correspondence between then minister Martina Dalić and a secret working group tasked with drafting the so-called Lex Agrokor legislation. The investigation later revealed a serious conflict of interest among the group's members. The fallout led to the minister's resignation.

In 2020, Index.hr revealed that PM Andrej Plenković (HDZ) had convened a confidential meeting with selected media representatives during the COVID-19 pandemic to influence their coverage.

In 2021, Index exposed that Mihanović, the HDZ candidate for mayor of Split, had plagiarized his doctoral dissertation at the University of Osijek.

In 2022, Index uncovered the largest leak of personal data in the country's history, prompting changes to Croatian law.

In 2024, Index uncovered one of the biggest fraudulent networks in the region, involving the online sale of misleadingly labeled teas and supplements. Arrests followed soon after the investigation was published.

Index.hr also launched a scandal registry with documented cases of abuse of power, corruption, and public misconduct.

== Awards ==
Index journalists have received numerous professional awards, including:

- Ilko Ćimić, 2011 – Marija Jurić Zagorka Award for investigative journalism (Croatian Journalists' Association, abbreivated as HND)
- Ilko Ćimić, 2013 – Marija Jurić Zagorka Award (HND)
- Ilko Ćimić & Oriana Ivković-Novokmet, 2018 – Marija Jurić Zagorka Award (HND)
- Ilko Ćimić & Oriana Ivković-Novokmet, 2018 – Jasna Babić Award for investigative journalism (HND)
- Vladimir Matijanić, 2022 – Marija Jurić Zagorka Award for online journalism (HND)
- Vladimir Matijanić, 2022 – Otokar Keršovani Lifetime Achievement Award (HND)
- Ilko Ćimić, 2022 – Marija Jurić Zagorka Award for online journalism (HND)

== Controversy ==
=== Severina Vučković's sex tape lawsuit and subsequent fallout ===
In 2004, Croatian singer Severina sued Index.hr for publishing explicit screenshots from a sex tape she had made. The part of the lawsuit dealing with copyright infringement was dismissed, but Index was ordered to pay the singer HRK100,000 as compensation for violation of privacy.

In 2012, enforcement action was initiated against Index.hr for failing to pay the compensation which had grown to HRK200,000 with interest and court costs.

In 2014, after ten years of court proceedings against Index.hr without compensation, Severina was granted the status of intellectual proprietor of Index's brand and logo through enforcement action, though the court thereafter ruled that compensation could not be sought from the publisher's account.

=== Slavko Linić's two dismissed lawsuits in 2014 ===
In 2014, the then Minister of Finance, Slavko Linić, initiated two lawsuits against Index promocija d.o.o. (Index.hr publisher) and Index.hr for damages valued at HRK210,000, which were dismissed at the Rijeka County Court for first instance proceedings.

In 2016, Index.hr and its journalists received criticism and death threats after publishing a controversial article regarding the veneration of the remains of Croatian Catholic saint Leopold Mandić. The Croatian Journalists' Association (HND) condemned both the words used by the site, which they described as "deeply insulting and disparaging" to believers, as well as the threats made against the newspaper. The Croatian Journalists and Publicists association (HNiP) accused the Council for Electronic Media (VEM) of "unethical ideological bias" for not holding the publisher of Index.hr (Index promocija d.o.o.) responsible and its "contextual defense of insulting religion and the religious feelings of Croatian citizens of the Roman Catholic faith". In 2017, five civil associations lost a first-instance court case against Index.hr in which they alleged that the text discriminated against Catholics. The judge accepted Index.hr's defense that believers were not the target and that the article was satirical criticism.

=== Bankruptcy ===
In February 2014, after a long period of account blocking due to amassed debt, the Croatian finance agency Fina rejected the proposal for a pre-bankruptcy settlement of HRK2.4 million by the companies Index portal d.o.o. and Prva stanica d.o.o. related to the business of the brand, owned by Babić. Later that same year Babić was also accused of using fictitious contracts with Vana Šalov Violić to sell his damaged company for around HRK2.8 million. In April 2015 he was sentenced to one year in prison at the Zagreb County Court after pleading guilty and settling with the prosecution. The one-year prison sentence was replaced by community service, and he was fined HRK300,000. According to the verdict, Babić and Šalov Violić had to pay about 1 million kuna to the state budget, and about HRK600,000 to the company they damaged. In 2016, Sport Index d.o.o., another company related to Index.hr and Babić, was opening bankruptcy proceedings with an established debt of over HRK290,000.
