= Vidi (magazine) =

- Editor: Tomislav Novak
- Categories: IT, hardware, software
- Frequency: Monthly
- Publisher: VIDI TO
- First issue: November 1994
- Company: VIDI TO
- Country: Croatia
- Based in: Zagreb
- Language: Croatian
- Website: www.vidilab.com

Vidi is a computer magazine, the first issue was released in November 1994. Its main topics are computers, but there are also articles about all segments of society where computers are in use.

== History ==
Since the founding of the magazine till the end of 2007, 142 issues were released, the lowest number of pages was 64, and the highest was 300. The 100th issue had the largest number of pages in July 2004, and it was the first Croatian magazine which reached that number of pages. The publisher is VIDI-TO d.o.o. in Zagreb, CEO is Tomislav Kotnik, who cofounded VIDI with Robert Slavečki. Editors in chief since the founding were:

- Robert Slavečki, 1994–2000
- Davor Maričić, 2000–2004
- Igor Škevin, 2004–2006
- Ivan Pekarik, 2006–2009
- Tomislav Novak, 2009–

Every issue has a number of information technology articles, hardware and software reviews, and a hardware comparison test where VIDI medals, Grand Prix and Best Buy, are awarded. Grand Prix is awarded to the best device on test, and Best Buy goes to the device which represents the optimum in performance and price.

VIDI is printed in Croatian and sold in Croatia, but it is also distributed in the whole region: (Slovenia, Bosnia and Herzegovina, Serbia, North Macedonia and Montenegro). First three issues were also officially sold in Austria (Graz), and they were sold out. But the transport costs were too high, so distribution in Austria was not continued. In November 2002. a website devoted to IT news and reviews, VidiLab, was also started. Daily news and periodical hardware and software reviews are posted there.

From the first to the 142nd issue there was a total of more than 100 authors who have contributed their knowledge and have written a total of over 5 million characters. Authors have been people of different levels of computer knowledge and interests, but of different education also, ranging from students to doctors of science.

== See also ==
- List of magazines in Croatia
