= Ephemerides Zagrabienses =

First Croatian newspaper

Ephemerides Zagrabienses was the first Croatian newspaper, established in 1771 in Zagreb. Fifty issues of the four-page newspaper in Latin were published by Antun Jandera, a Czech-born printer. Little is known about its content, as there are no surviving copies.

By Jandera's late 1771 account, the editor of the newspaper had left, and others were not willing to step in, so the newspaper stopped receiving local news. The unnamed editor is believed to have been Baltazar Adam Krčelić, a prominent chronicler of daily events.

== Sources ==
- Hrvatska pisana kultura - 18. stoljeće (in Croatian)
- Novine (in Croatian)
- Čeh nam je dao svjetlo, a sad nam brani ulazak u EU (in Croatian)
- Početci hrvatskoga novinstva i publicistike (in Croatian)
- Antun Jandera – izdavač prvih hrvatskih novina (in Croatian)
