= Poslovni dnevnik =

Croatian newspaper

- Type: Daily newspaper (published on workdays)
- Owner(s): Styria Media Group (since March 2008)
- Publisher: 24 sata d.o.o.
- Founded: March 2004
- Language: Croatian
- Headquarters: Oreškovićeva 6H/1, Zagreb, Croatia
- ISSN: 1845-8246
- Website: poslovni.hr

Poslovni dnevnik (lit. 'The Business Daily') is a Croatian daily business newspaper published in Zagreb. The newspaper, billed as the first Croatian business daily, was originally launched in March 2004. The print edition is published five times a week, Monday through Friday, and each issue is printed on peach-colored paper, in imitation of the Financial Times.

The paper also runs the Poslovni.hr website, which re-publishes feature articles from the print edition along with shorter breaking news items and a full overview of daily stock market indices from the Zagreb Stock Exchange and other stock exchanges from the region.

The newspaper was acquired by the Austrian-based Styria Medien AG media company in March 2008, one of the two largest media groups operating in Croatia which also owns the Večernji list daily and 24sata tabloid. At the time, the paper's main competitor on the local market was Business.hr, which folded in 2014.

Since May 2010 the newspaper also includes the Croatian-language edition of The International Weekly, a weekly selection of articles from The New York Times'.

It also won several graphic design accolades: for Best Typography in the 2008 European Newspaper Awards, and in 2009 for Best Front Page in the national newspaper category, for two front pages published in May 2009.

== See also ==
- Business.hr (the only other business daily published in Croatia 2005–2014)
- Privredni vjesnik (the oldest business publication in Croatia, established in 1953 and published weekly)
