= Start (Yugoslav magazine) =

Men's and current affairs magazine in Yugoslavia (1969–1991)

- Categories: Men's magazine; Current affairs magazine
- Frequency: Weekly
- Founded: 1969
- First issue: 29 January 1969
- Final issue: 1991
- Company: Vjesnik
- Country: Yugoslavia
- Based in: Zagreb

Start was a weekly popular and entertainment magazine targeting men published from 1969 to 1991 in Zagreb by the Croatian publishing house Vjesnik. Best known for its mix of erotica - which featured on the cover and centerfolds - and quality articles and detailed analyses of current affairs and Yugoslav politics, the magazine became very influential in the 1970s and 1980s with an audience spanning all over Yugoslavia.

== History and profile ==
Start was established in 1969 as a successor to the Moto magazin. The first issue of Start appeared in January that year. It was headquartered in Zagreb and was published by Vjesnik which was a well-known publishing house in the country. The first issue described it as "a magazine for every family, and for each of our citizens." However, it was also added in the same issue that the magazine content included all topics "that interests a modern man." The magazine came out weekly.

In the initial phase Start was designed based on Playboy, Lui and Penthouse. During this period its cover pages featured nude photographs of women, one of which was the French actress Maria Schneider. Following the change of its editor-in-chief in 1973 Start was redesigned becoming a political and cultural magazine which was modeled on the German magazine Stern.

Start contained erotic and pornographic materials in addition to the critical and comprehensive analyses on current affairs, science and art. The latter became dominant from 1973. One of its most significant sections was the interviews which featured both interviews with Yugoslavian leading figures and translations of the interviews from foreign magazines. It also published literary works most which were the examples of a genre called "jeans-prose". Later its focus was exclusively on current affairs. Start frequently published materials from Ms., an American magazine, and contained articles on feminism most of which were written by Jasenka Kodrnja and Maja Miles. Vesna Kesić and Slavenka Drakulić were other contributors of the magazine.

Mladen Pleša was appointed editor-in-chief of Start in 1980 and then, the magazine began to target young readers featuring articles on rock music, modern art and fashion.

By 1984 Start was selling 200,000 copies every week, with half of sales generated on the Serbian market. The magazine enjoyed higher levels of circulation during its run. Start folded in 1991.

== Editors-in-chief ==
- Andrinko Krile (1969–1972)
- Borivoj Jurković (1972–1973)
- Sead Saračević (1973–1980)
- Mladen Pleše (1989–1990)
- Marjan Jurleka (1990–1991)
- Fernando Soprano (1991)
- Krunoslav Poljak (1991)
