= Hrvatski Telekom =

Croatian telecommunications company

Hrvatski Telekom d.d.
- Company type: Public Subsidiary
- Traded as: ZSE: HT
- ISIN: HRHT00RA0005
- Industry: Telecommunications
- Founded: 28 December 1998; 27 years ago
- Headquarters: Zagreb, Croatia
- Area served: Croatia
- Key people: Nataša Rapaić (CEO)
- Products: Fixed telephony Mobile telephony Broadband Internet; IT Services
- Revenue: €1.039 billion (2023)
- Net income: €132 million (2023)
- Total assets: €2.061 billion (2023)
- Total equity: €1.658 billion (2023)
- Number of employees: 4,917 (2023)
- Parent: Deutsche Telekom (53.5%)
- Subsidiaries: Combis; Iskon Internet; Crnogorski Telekom (77%); HT Eronet (39%)
- Website: www.hrvatskitelekom.hr

Hrvatski Telekom, also known as HT or Telekom, is a Croatian telecommunications company founded in 1998. Headquartered in Zagreb, it is majority-owned by Deutsche Telekom with a 53.5% stake and is publicly traded on the Zagreb Stock Exchange.

== History ==
T-Hrvatski Telekom logo

The company was founded on 28 December 1998 after the separation of the Croatian Post and Telecommunications (Croatian: Hrvatska pošta i telekomunikacije) into two entities: Hrvatska pošta (Croatian Post) and Hrvatski Telekom (Croatian Telecom), which started their business operations on 1 January 1999.

Government of Croatia initiated the privatization of the state-owned telecommunications company, Hrvatski Telekom, in 1998. By October 1999, Deutsche Telekom, a German company, purchased a 35% stake in Hrvatski Telekom for $850 million and acquired an additional 16% stake in 2001, becoming the majority shareholder with 51%.

In 2001, Hrvatski Telekom acquired Cronet, which was the second mobile operator in Croatia and the first to offer GSM network services in the country in 1996. Hrvatski Telekom established HT-mobilne komunikacije d.o.o. in 2002 as a separate entity dedicated to mobile services.

The company rebranded as T-HT on October 1, 2004, becoming part of the global T-family of Deutsche Telekom. This included new trademarks for two business units: T-Com for fixed network operations and T-Mobile for mobile operations.

The Croatian government transferred 7% of its shares in HT to the Fund for Croatian Homeland War Veterans and Their Families on February 17, 2005. Later that year, on October 14, 2005, Hrvatski Telekom acquired a 39.1% stake in JP HT d.d. Mostar, known as HT Eronet, from the Government of the Federation of Bosnia and Herzegovina as part of the national telecom company's privatization process.

In May 2006, HT acquired Iskon Internet, a major telecom provider in Croatia. By October 5, 2007, the Croatian government sold 32.5% of HT's shares through an IPO, reducing its stake to 3.5% by June 2008, with private and institutional investors then holding 38.5%.

Hrvatski Telekom absorbed its subsidiary, T-Mobile, on January 1, 2010, creating a single unified company. The T-Com and T-Mobile brands were discontinued, although they remained active for business customers until 2013. HT acquired the IT services company Combis on May 17, 2010.

The Croatian government transferred 3.5% of its shares to the Pensioners’ Fund in December 2010, which transferred them to the Restructuring and Sale Center (CERP) in December 2013. CERP reduced its holding to 2.9% in December 2015.

In June 2014, HT acquired OT-Optima Telekom and subsequently held 19.1% of Optima's share capital. The Croatian competition agency extended HT's management of Optima until 2021.

HT acquired a 76.53% stake in Crnogorski Telekom, the largest telecommunications company in Montenegro, from Magyar Telekom for €123.5 million in January 2017. Magyar Telekom, like HT, has Deutsche Telekom as a majority stakeholder.

Hrvatski Telekom transferred its interests and shares in various subsidiaries, including Iskon Internet and OT-Optima Telekom, to HT holding on March 1, 2018. HT sold its electricity business to RWE Hrvatska in September 2018 and acquired digital terrestrial television provider HP Produkcija in November 2018, renaming it HT Produkcija in April 2019. HT sold its share in the travel agency E-tours to Uniline in November 2019.

In January 2020, HT started selling its shares in Optima. By July 2021, HT and Zagrebačka banka agreed to sell their 54.31% stake in Optima to Telemach Hrvatska, finalizing the transfer in January 2022.

HT merged Kabelsko distributivni sustav (KDS) into HT, completed in December 2021. HT Produkcija was merged into HT in June 2022. HT holding transferred its shares in Iskon Internet to HT in June 2023, and the merger of Iskon into HT was completed in January 2024. The network unit from Ericsson Nikola Tesla Servisi joined HT Servisi, a subsidiary of HT, on January 1, 2024.

== Services ==
HT offers fixed telephony, broadband internet, and mobile telephony services. The company also provides television services under the MaxTV (IPTV and satellite) and EvoTV (pay digital terrestrial television) brands, as well as internet, television, and mobile services under the Iskon brand.

Additionally, HT offers to companies IT services through its subsidiary, Combis.

== Shareholding and trading ==
Hrvatski Telekom was listed on the Zagreb Stock Exchange in October 2007, with global depositary receipts trading on the London Stock Exchange until 2014. As of 2024, the company's majority shareholder is Deutsche Telekom AG, holding a 53.5% stake. Other significant shareholders include the Croatian War Veterans' Fund with 7% and the Croatian government's Restructuring and Sale Center with 2.7%. The remaining 36.8% of shares are held by private investors.

== See also ==
- List of mobile network operators in Europe
