= Drvo znanja =

Croatian children's science magazine

Drvo znanja (meaning Tree of Knowledge in English) was a Croatian popular science magazine targeting children published monthly (except in summer) until 2013 by SysPrint. The magazine was based in Zagreb, Croatia.

== History and profile ==
Drvo znanja was first published in 1998. The magazine targeted students attending the fifth through the eighth grades. It usually covered all topics related to curricula such as plants, animals, history, art, technology, science, Earth, human body, atlas, sport and English (the magazine dedicated two pages to learning English). The number of pages in each article varied between 80 and 110 color pages. There are Drvo znanja casings in different colors (green, blue, black etc.). The magazine usually included features such as a readers' mail section, CD, web-links, posters, quiz, news from the world (usually the latest results of researches).
