= University Computing Centre =

Coordinates: 45°47′33″N 15°58′10″E

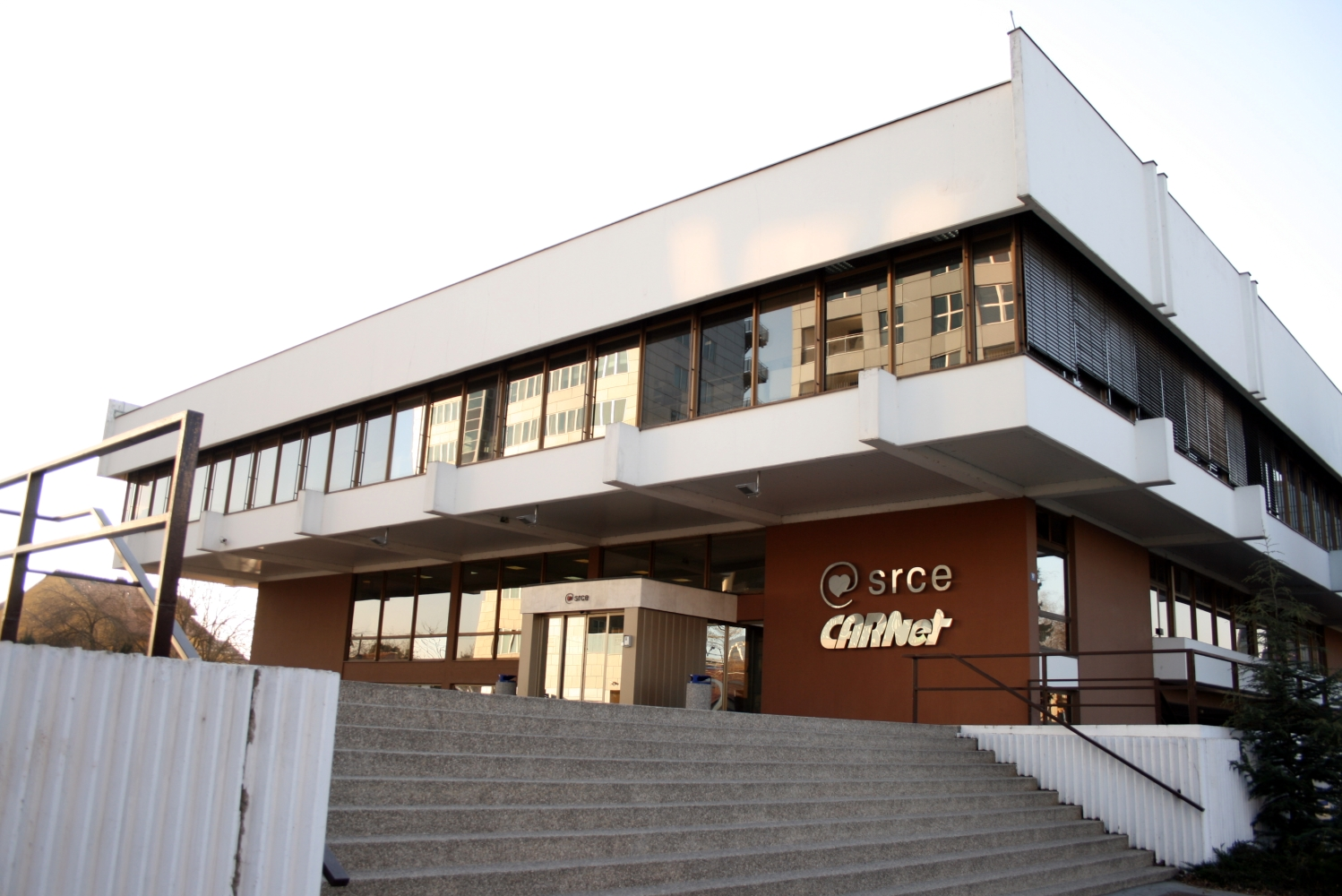
The University Computing Centre building at 5 Marohnić Street in Zagreb, home to SRCE and CARNET

The University Computing Centre in Zagreb (Croatian: Sveučilišni računski centar, abbreviated SRCE, which also means "heart") has a long tradition in the area of information and communication technologies. It was founded in 1971 within the University of Zagreb, the only Croatian university at the time, with the purpose to enhance the implementation of information technologies in the academic community as well as in Croatia in general.

Today, SRCE is the main computing centre and the architect of the e-infrastructure, covering both the University of Zagreb and the whole research and high education system. Furthermore, SRCE is the competence center for information and communication technologies as well as the center for education and support in the area of ICT application.

== Mission ==
The University Computing Centre – SRCE provides support to the academic community in building the information society in the Republic of Croatia through the implementation of the latest information and communication technologies, high quality student support and collecting and transferring expert knowledge.

== Fundamental functions of SRCE ==
Fundamental functions of SRCE are: (1) central nod for e-infrastructure for scientific and university education systems (2) expert centre for ICT, (3) educational and support centre for the application of ICT.

== Major activities and projects in Srce ==
- NOC - network operations center of the national Academic and Research Network CARNET, which was founded in Srce in 1991 as a project of the Ministry of science, education and sports. SRCE maintained CARNET NOC until April 2009.
- StuDOM - local network system for all student dormitories
- DNS HR – SRCE has been conducting operational registering and maintenance of the domain system since 1992, i.e. the registration of the Croatian national domain (.hr)
- CIX - Croatian Internet eXchange – national centre for the Internet exchange
- CRO-GRID Infrastructure – national grid infrastructure – distributed computer system, based on the paradigm of the computer and information grid. Accessible by the CRO-GRID Portal, a Grid portal operated by the Ruđer Bošković Institute and based on P-GRADE Portal technology. The project finished in 2006 and as a result in 2007 CRO NGI was started.
- Computer cluster Isabella – common resource of all scientist in Croatia for advanced calculations.
- AAI@EduHr – Authentication and authorization infrastructure (AAI) of the scientific and higher education system in the Republic of Croatia
- Network applications - MWP (measuring web space), HRČAK (site for Croatian electronic scientific magazines), DAMP and AMD (network publications archive)
- ISVU – Informational system of higher education institutions in the Republic of Croatia
- ISSP - Informational system of student canteen (students' X-card)
- Beginners and advanced IT courses
- Expert educational programs for information technology and computer experts and professionals (Microsoft IT academy, A Cloud Guru, Cisco network technologies academy programs)
- Exam centre for international certificates (ECDL, Pearson VUE)
- E-learning center
- CIT – international magazine Journal of Computing and Information Technology
- ITI – international conference Information Technology Interfaces

== International cooperation ==
SRCE actively participates in a number of international projects:

- GÉANT2 - Multi-gigabit Pan-European Research and Education Network; Srce participates in the project as the Third Party, i.e. as a multi-annual partner of CARNET. Srce is the leader of eduroam SA – activity aimed at establishing and maintaining continuously reliable and safe service in Europe. Through contract with DANTE (Delivery of Advanced Network Technology to Europe) Srce has been an international GÉANT network nod;
- EGEE-II - Enabling Grids for E-sciencE; Srce has been participating in the project as a project partner – representative of the Croatian institutions (institutions involved in the CRO-GRID project) based on the Joint Research Unit (JRU) model;
- EQIBELT - Education Quality Improvement by e-Learning Technology, EU Tempus project with the aim of systematic implementation of methodologies and technologies of e-learning at the Croatian universities.
