= GamePlay (magazine) =

Croatian video game magazine

- The 97th issue cover
- Editor-in-Chief: Dario Zrno
- Categories: Video game
- Frequency: Monthly
- Format: Magazine
- Publisher: NCL Media Grupa d.o.o.
- First issue: November 2002
- Final issue: February 2011
- Country: Croatia
- Based in: Zagreb, Croatia
- Language: Croatian
- ISSN: 1333-8218

GamePlay was a Croatian video game magazine which used to be published on monthly basis, first priced at 18 kunas, and then later at 20 kunas. It is considered to be the successor of PSX, with most of the team behind PSX also working on GamePlay. It covered a wide range of gaming platforms, always bringing the latest news, previews, reviews and features. The first issue came out on 28 November 2002, while the final (99th) issue was released in February 2011. Though the publishing group planned to create a new version of GamePlay magazine and site, the plans were not realised. In 2012, the team started working on another video game magazine Next Level, which is considered as a successor to GamePlay. The magazine also had an accompanying online news site and a forum for discussions. It had around 100 pages.

== History ==
The magazine was started by the same team who worked on the PSX magazine. It was carefully projected to satisfy all the demographics playing video games. Their main goal was to keep nurturing and help expand the gaming culture in Croatia. In the wake of magazine's launch on 28 November 2002, Dario Zrno had stated: "Our main goal is to keep creating the gaming culture in Croatia and to prepare the players for the near online boom, when the consoles will connect to Internet and when finally the online console gaming can start in Croatia as well. Soon, you'll be able to live in the virtual world of 'Star Wars', Harry Potter or Tolkien and let's not forget you'll be able to play a few games against Brasil online. All that is coming in less than half a year."

The magazine was redesigned in 2005 and PC was added as one of the gaming platforms they're covering. In 2005, the team behind GamePlay was also joined by the people who worked on another video game magazine Hacker, which ceased to publish in 2005. The quality of the magazine was always gradually improving and was always on a high note.

However, the problems started near the end of 2010 when the publishing group NCL ran into financial problems. The publishers asked the team to print the magazine on a paper of lesser quality, with less pages and reduced costs. The team of GamePlay refused such terms and the last, 99th, issue came out in February 2011. NCL had plans to create a new version of GamePlay magazine and site, but they never came through. The team set out to create a new magazine called Next Level.
