= Zadarski list =

Newspaper in Croatia

- Front page of the 11 September 2012 issue
- Type: Daily newspaper
- Publisher: RTD d.o.o.
- Editor-in-chief: Luka Perić
- Founded: 3 November 1994
- Language: Croatian
- Headquarters: 6 Grgura Mrganića Street, Zadar, Croatia
- Circulation: 3,500 (Oct 2014)
- Website: www.zadarskilist.hr

Zadarski list is a Croatian daily newspaper based in Zadar.

Zadarski list started on 3 November 1994 as a weekly. At that time, it was focused on the news from Zadar and the Zadar County, reaching a circulation of 12,000. Zadarski list became a daily newspaper on 21 December 1998, and switched to wider coverage of events in Croatia and the world.
