= Business.hr =

- Type: Daily business newspaper
- Format: Compact
- Founded: 2005
- Ceased publication: 2014

Business.hr was a Croatian business newspaper and website based in Zagreb active between late 2005 and late 2014. The newspaper was published in compact format and was originally launched as a weekly, before becoming a daily newspaper in March 2008.

Like their only competitor at the time on the Croatian market, Poslovni dnevnik, the paper also ran the Business.hr website, which re-published feature articles from the print edition along with short current news items and a full overview of daily stock market indices from the Zagreb Stock Exchange and other stock exchanges from the region.

The paper was originally founded by the Swedish Bonnier Group, a media group present in 21 countries, which also owned the Slovenian business daily Finance. In the wake of the 2008 financial crisis, the Bonnier group announced in February 2009 that they would shut down the newspaper due to a sharp drop in advertising revenue. The company had up to that point reportedly invested some 10 million euros in Business.hr from 2006 to 2009.

However, in April 2009 the paper was sold to Mims Group, a Bosnian group owned by Mujo Selimović which also owned the Sarajevo-based dailies Oslobođenje and San. Mims Group bought a 65 percent share while the remaining 35 percent was acquired by a company called Mreža Znanja from Zagreb.

The paper struggled to survive in the following years. It changed publishers and headquarters several times, senior journalists began leaving the company, its circulation dramatically fell, and in late 2014 the paper switched back to a weekly format. In December 2014 the print edition ceased publication, and in February 2015 the website was shut down as well.
