= .hr =

Internet country code top-level domain for Croatia

- Introduced: 27 February 1993 (in root zone); March 1993
- TLD type: Country code top-level domain
- Status: Active
- Registry: CARNET
- Sponsor: CARNET
- Intended use: Entities connected with Croatia
- Actual use: Very popular in Croatia
- Registered domains: 131,896 (3 April 2024)
- Registration restrictions: Limited to Croatian citizens, residents, and companies/organizations; various rules and restrictions based on categories of registrants
- Structure: Registrations are taken directly at second level or at third level beneath some second-level labels
- Dispute policies: Arbitration
- Registry website: DNS Croatia

.hr is the Internet country code top-level domain (ccTLD) for Croatia (the country's name is Hrvatska in the Croatian language).

== Details ==
The .hr domain is administered by CARNET (Croatian Academic and Research Network), via the CARNET DNS Committee which determines policy, and the CARNET DNS Service which handles day-to-day matters. The committee is composed of members generally associated with the academic community. Until 2010, the Service was operated by SRCE; since 1 July 2010 the service operations are divided between CARNET itself, SRCE and a variety of registrars.

Registrants are classified into a number of different groups with different rules about their domain registrations. A requirement of connection to Croatia, such as being a citizen, permanent resident, registered company or EU company with VAT ID evidenced in the VIES system, is common to all of the categories except for the .com.hr. Third level domains (example.com.hr) are allowed to be registered for anyone in the world as long as they provide a local contact.

There are also third-level registrations including of individuals in a few specialized domains such as .iz.hr (.from.hr), and an unlimited number of registrations in .com.hr, but these are unpopular compared to the second-level names registered directly under .hr.

=== Statistics ===
As of March 2017, around 30.33% of all the .hr domains were served via secured HTTPS protocol, with the cPanel, Inc. Certification Authority being the most popular SSL certificate. Apache is the most popular web server, serving 65.93% of the .hr domains, followed by Microsoft-IIS serving 13.23% of the total .hr domains. As of 14 December 2017 at 3PM CET, over 100,000 .hr domain names are registered.
