= Bug (magazine) =

Croatian computer magazine

- Bug Magazine, Issue 204 (2009)
- Editor: Miroslav Rosandić
- Categories: Computer magazine, Information technology
- Frequency: Monthly
- First issue: December 1992
- Company: BUG d.o.o.
- Country: Croatia
- Based in: Zagreb
- Language: Croatian
- Website: www.bug.hr
- ISSN: 1330-0318

Bug is a Croatian monthly computer and information technology magazine, established in 1992 by Croatian ETF students Tonči Carić, Robert Šipek, Jadranko Stjepanović and journalist Miroslav Rosandić. Published by Bug d.o.o. za novinsko-nakladničku djelatnost, it is currently one of the most popular computer magazines in the country. It focuses primarily on PC hardware and software technology. The magazine also includes sections for video games, news, columnist writing, a helpdesk, and self-assembly.

Other magazine published by the same company is Mreža for professionals.

== Specifications ==
First issue (1992)

The magazine is named after the computing term bug. It has approximately 170 pages of content. it is sold in the SE European region of Croatia, Bosnia and Herzegovina, Montenegro, North Macedonia, and Slovenia. The current editor-in-chief is Miroslav Rosandić.

Software-related content usually centers around material for Windows users with occasional attention given to Macintosh and Linux. The magazine also takes part in hardware test ratings (e.g., cameras, laptops, computer parts, and storage devices), internet phenomena articles, and some other material.

=== Issue 200 ===
The pages experienced a redesign in 2009, with the publication of the 200th issue of the magazine. The redesign was done after the associated website was revamped. In November 2010, the website launched a mobile version.
