= Novi list =

Croatian daily newspaper published in Rijeka

Coordinates: 45°19′43″N 14°26′27″E

- Novi list front page, December 3, 2011
- Type: Daily newspaper
- Format: Berliner
- Owner(s): JOJ Media House, a.s.
- Editor: Ankica Kruljac
- Founded: 1900
- Political alignment: Historically: Centre-left, liberal Contemporary: Centre-right
- City: Rijeka
- Country: Croatia
- Circulation: 21,188 (as of October 2014)
- Website: www.novilist.hr

Novi list (lit. 'New paper') is the oldest Croatian daily newspaper published in Rijeka. It is read mostly in Primorje-Gorski Kotar County of Croatia, but it is distributed throughout the country.

Novi list had the distinction of being the only Croatian daily newspaper that kept a critical distance from the government of Franjo Tuđman during the 1990s. In 2016, it was acquired by the Slovak-based JOJ Media House.
