= Croatian Journalists' Association =

Press association in Croatia

Coordinates: 45°48′27″N 15°58′05″E

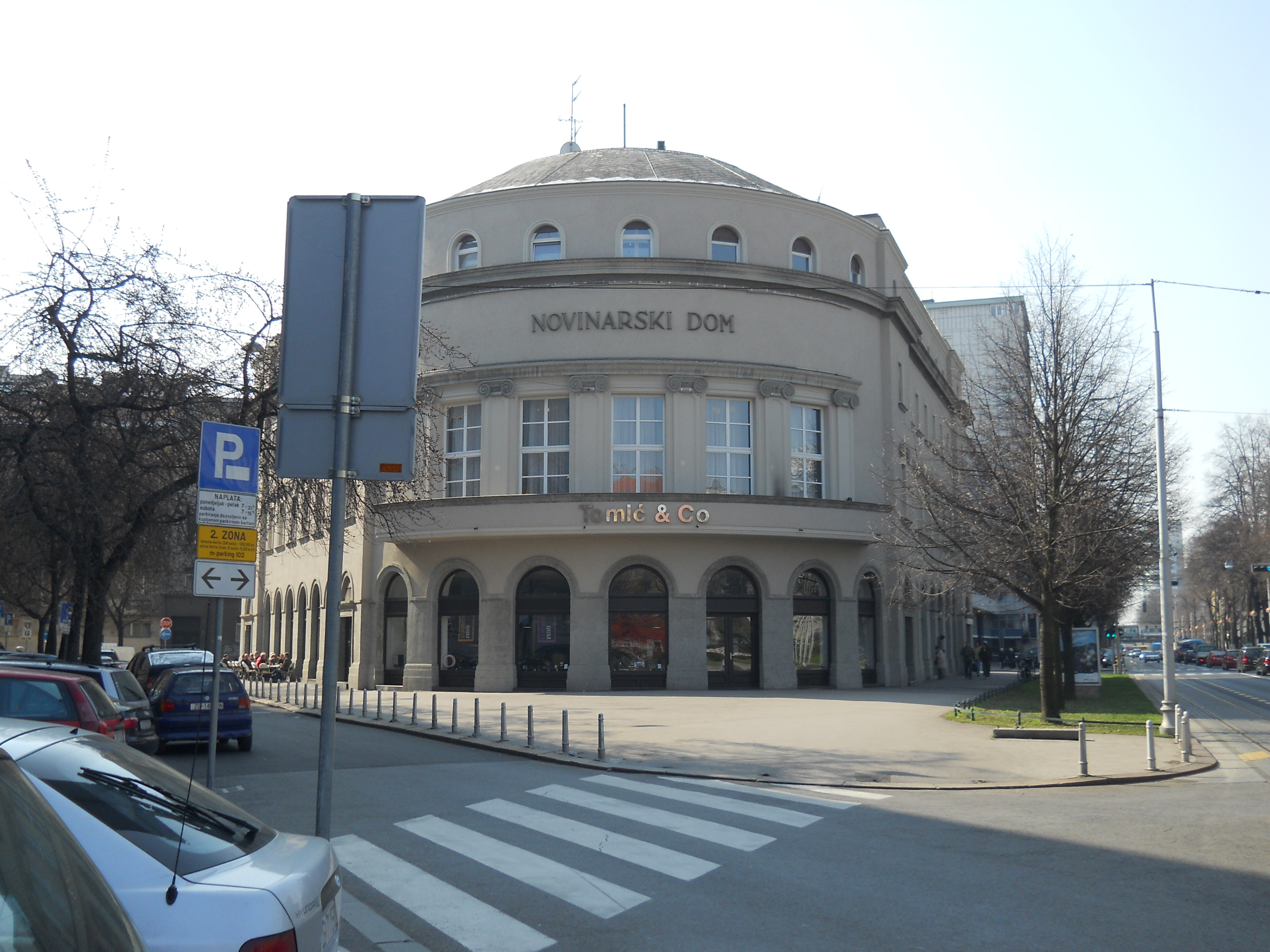
The building in Zagreb where the HND is located is called Novinarski dom, lit. "Journalist's home".

The Croatian Journalists' Association (Croatian: Hrvatsko novinarsko društvo or HND) is a Croatian association based in Zagreb aimed at promoting freedom of the press and free speech in journalism.

The association was founded in December 1910 and has over 3,000 members. It arranges debates on current topics and hands out annual prizes for excellence in journalism. The association is a member of the International Federation of Journalists since 1992.

A second Croatian Journalists and Publicists (HNiP) association was founded on 2 July 2015 after a group of journalists and publicists perceived there were gross irregularities in the elections of a branch on Croatian Radiotelevision (HRT).

== See also ==
- Media of Croatia#Trade unions
