= 24sata (Croatia) =

Croatian newspaper

- Cover of the 2 March 2005 issue
- Type: Daily newspaper
- Format: Tabloid
- Owner: Styria Media Group
- Publisher: 24sata d.o.o.
- Editor: Goran Gavranović
- Founded: 2 March 2005; 21 years ago
- Language: Croatian
- Headquarters: Oreškovićeva 6H/1
- City: Zagreb
- Country: Croatia
- Circulation: 116,000 (2013)
- ISSN: 1845-3929
- Website: www.24sata.hr

24sata (lit. '24hours') is a daily tabloid newspaper published in Zagreb, Croatia. As of 2007, it is the highest-circulation daily newspaper in Croatia. It is also most visited news website in Croatia and leading news source on social media platforms.

== History and profile ==
24sata is a daily newspaper in Croatia. It was launched by Styria Medien AG, an Austrian media group, in March 2005. Its first editor-in-chief, Matija Babić, announced that the new newspaper would target "young, urban and modern" audiences.

The first issue of 24sata seemed to be nothing more than the first Croatian daily tabloid newspaper in terms of both its content and format.

After Matija Babić was removed from the post of editor-in-chief on 5 July 2005, Boris Trupčević was appointed said position. Before the latter joined 24sata, Trupčević was the publisher of Sanoma Magazines in Croatia and succeeded by Renato Ivanuš. As of 2015, Goran Gavranović serves as editor-in-chief.

24sata had a circulation of 116,000 copies in 2013, and was the only Croatian daily that saw its revenue grow that year.

== Online ==
The online version was launched at the same time as the print edition. It became the most-visited website in Croatia in 2012. Online version has a mobile website, as well as iOS, Android and Windows phone applications.

== Awards and recognition ==
- In 2009, 24sata was awarded the European Newspaper of the Year in the category of Judges' Special Recognition by the European Newspapers Congress.
- In October 2012, the paper was given the Best Use of Facebook Award at the XMA Cross Media Awards held in Frankfurt, Germany.
- In 2014 INMA awarded 24sata with second place in category Best Idea To Grow Digital Audience or Engagement

== Bibliography ==
- Popović, Helena; Bilić, Paško; Jelić, Tomislav; Švob-Đokić, Nada (29 October 2010). "The case of Croatia". Media policies and regulatory practices in a selected set of European countries, the EU and the Council of Europe (PDF). Athens: The Mediadem Consortium. pp. 77–107. Archived from the original (PDF) on 2 January 2015.
