= CARNET =

National research and education network of Croatia

- Croatian Academic and Research Network
- Hrvatska akademska i istraživačka mreža
- Founder: Government of the Republic of Croatia
- Location: Josipa Marohnića 5, 10000 Zagreb
- Subsidiaries: 6 (Zagreb, Split, Dubrovnik, Osijek, Rijeka, Pula)
- Budget: 181.1 million HRK (c. 24 million EUR) (2019)
- Staff: 141 (2018)
- Website: www.carnet.hr/en

CARNET (Croatian Academic and Research Network, Croatian: Hrvatska akademska i istraživačka mreža) is the national research and education network of Croatia. It is funded from the government budget and it operates from offices in Zagreb and five other cities.

CARNET was established in 1991 as a project of the Ministry of Science and Technology of the Republic of Croatia. In March 1995 the Government of the Republic of Croatia passed the Decree on founding of the CARNET institution with the purpose of facilitating progress of individuals, as well as of the society as a whole, through the use of new information technologies.

CARNET's activities can be divided in three basic areas: Internet service provision, encouragement of information society development and education for the new era.

== History ==
=== The institution ===
A body responsible for coordinating the establishment of the Croatian educational computer network has been established on 3 October 1991. That was the beginning of the work of the Croatian Academic and Research Network - CARNET, the first Internet service provider (ISP) in Croatia. In the several years that followed CARNET was the only ISP in Croatia, providing the service free of charge, not only to the academic community, but to all citizens of the Republic of Croatia as well.

In November 1992 the first international communication connection was established, which connected CARNET Internet exchange point in Zagreb to Austria. By that act Croatia became a part of the world computer network – the Internet.

During 1992, the first equipment was procured and the backbone of the CARNET network was built. Institutions in Croatia were connected at the speed of 19 - 200 kbit/s, while the whole network was connected to the Internet through Austria at the speed of 64 kbit/s. The first institutions to be connected to the Internet were the University Computing Centre - SRCE, Faculty of Electrical Engineering and Computing in Zagreb (FER), Ruđer Bošković Institute (IRB), Faculty of Science (PMF), the Faculty of Electrical Engineering, Mechanical Engineering and Naval Architecture in Split, the Faculty of Engineering in Rijeka, the Faculty of Economics in Osijek and the Ministry of Science and Technology.

During the first months of 1993, CARNET was assigned the administration over the top-level .hr domain by the international organisation called the Internet Assigned Numbers Authority (IANA). In October 1994, CARNET started offering the first Internet courses to its users and, in time, user education became one of CARNET’s most important activities.

=== Network ===
In 1996, the backbone of CARNET network was upgraded by introducing the ATM technology which enables real-time transfer of image and sound at the basic speed of 155 Mbit/s.

In January 1997, the first distance lecture in Croatia was organized through the CARNET ATM core between the Rectorate of the Osijek University and the Faculty of Electrical Engineering and Computing in Zagreb. GÉANT, the pan-European academic and research network, was put into service on 1 December 2001, and CARNET, among others, connected to it.

In cooperation with the University Computing Centre - SRCE, in 2003 CARNET released the Giga CARNET project in order to use gigabit technologies to develop a high quality infrastructure for CARNET member institutions, faculties and research institutes. In the framework of the Giga CARNET project, in February 2004 CARNET was enabled, through the connection to the GÉANT network, to have a twice-faster connection to similar academic and research networks in Europe and all over the world (at the speed of 1.2 Gbit/s instead of the former 622 Mbit/s).

As a necessary requirement for further cooperation between CARNET and the world's academic and research communities, in June 2007 the speed of CARNET's connection towards the GÉANT network was increased to 10 Gbit/s.

Chronology

=== 2020 Cyberattack ===
On 16 March, Minister of Education Blaženka Divjak confirmed that the same day CARNET, responsible for online classes in Croatia, was a victim of a cyberattack making the online classes impossible at that moment.

== Organisation ==
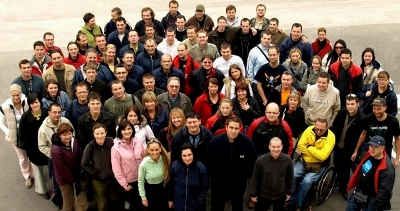
CARNET employees

CARNET operates through services and projects integrated in eight departments:

- Network Infrastructure Department
- Computer and IT Systems and Services Department
- Computer Security Department
- National CERT Department
- User Support Department
- Education Support Department
- General and Financial Activities Department
- Office of the CEO

The CEO coordinates the activities at the level of the entire institution and outside it, acts on behalf of the institution and represents CARNET in public. CARNET Executive Committee consists of the CEO, the vice CEO and deputy CEOs (heads of the said departments). The Committee coordinates short- and long-term planning, makes decisions on business organisation and is responsible for the relations with the government bodies, users, partners and the public.

CARNET is run by the Managing Council which represents the interests of CARNET founders, the Government of the Republic of Croatia. Managing Council members are appointed by the Minister of Science, Education and Sports.

The Users Board is CARNET's advisory body consisting of all CARNET coordinators at CARNET member institutions as the representatives of the academic community, heads of county-level computer science councils as the representatives of school system users, and the CARNET CEO.

== Infrastructure ==
CARNET infrastructure

Basic activities of the Croatian Academic and Research Network - CARNET are network development, building and maintenance. CARNET network is a private network of the Croatian academic, scientific and research community and the primary and secondary school system institutions.

Network infrastructure is owned by the CARNET institution, but cables are rented from a number of telecommunication providers. CARNET network is an example of a WAN network which enables CARNET members throughout Croatia to be connected into a compact information and communication system.

CARNET network is a data network whose principal purpose is to transfer data through the TCP/IP protocol. The currently supported version of the TCP/IP protocol in the CARNET network as its integral part is version 4 (IPv4). The key characteristic of every private network is its connection to the global network - the Internet. The CARNET network established this connection through the GÉANT pan-European research network, with the current connection speed of 10 Gbit/s. The connection to other Internet service providers in Croatia has been implemented through the Croatian Internet Exchange Point – CIX.

In Croatia, the CARNET network connects the major Croatian towns and cities on the mainland and a number of settlements on the islands. The larger university centres (Dubrovnik, Osijek, Pula, Rijeka, Split, Zadar, Zagreb) have high speed connections (ranging from 155 Mbit/s to 1 Gbit/s), while smaller centres are connected at the speeds ranging from 2 Mbit/s to 100 Mbit/s. Zagreb has a particularly advanced infrastructure, connecting larger faculties and scientific institutions at the speeds of up to 10 Gbit/s. Thanks to the project "e-Split", which CARNET has accomplished in cooperation with the City of Split, Split is the first city in which CARNET has its own optical network. Through that optical network 158 CARNET member institutions, in the city area, are connected to CARNET network.

More than 900 institutions from the primary and secondary school systems are also connected to the CARNET network via ADSL connections, and schools on Croatian islands have been connected to CARNET network in the framework of the e-Islands project.

== International cooperation ==
As part of its vision of inclusion of the Republic of Croatia in modern information society, CARNET participates in a series of international activities.

Parallel with the increase of physical link speed on GEANT network, there is an increased development of CARNET's parallel (human) link towards European and international academic Internet community. CARNET activities in the sphere of international cooperation are forming a stable communication channel towards foreign countries, providing CARNET with an opportunity to present Croatia and its academic research community.

International cooperation includes following the activities of other academic networks in Europe and participating in the work of international organisations that gather national, educational, academic and research networks. CARNET also promotes the inclusion of the Croatian academic community into international projects in the field of information technologies research and application and coordinates the participation of CARNET employees in international projects.

CARNET is active member of several international organisations:

- Trans - European Research and Education Networking Association
- The Internet Corporation for Assigned Names and Numbers
- Réseaux IP Européens
- Council of European National Top-Level Domain Registries
- Forum of Incident Response and Security Teams (FIRST)
- NREN Consortium

== Users ==
CARNET users are member institutions and individual users.

CARNET member institutions are institutions belonging to the science and higher education system, as well as those belonging to the primary and secondary school systems. By obtaining the member status, institutions are connected to the CARNET network and entitled to use the CARNET services. CARNET has 241 member institutions from the academic community connected to the CARNET network at 418 locations. There are 1385 members from the primary and secondary school systems, connected at 1283 locations.

Individual users are higher education students and professors, scientists and persons employed in the academic and higher education community, primary and secondary school students, teachers and employees at primary and secondary schools and student homes.

At their respective central institution individual users obtain electronic identities in the AAI@EduHr system. Electronic identity is a virtual identity on the CARNET network which serves for user authentication and authorisation for different CARNET services and is necessary for the use of CARNET services.

== Services ==
- Internet Access: Continuous Connection, Net in School, E-islands, Mobile CARNET, Super/2D/3D CARNET, MetroCARNET, DUO.CARNET, OptiCARNET, Vipme CARNET, Stick2CARNET, Tele2CARNET, Homebox CARNET and CARNET Modem Entries.
- Education: Online Courses, E-learning Academy, E-courses for Schools, Moodle, Teacher Training, National Distance Learning Portal "Nikola Tesla", Školska Učilica, Schools Portal, E-library, CARNET Users Conference CUC, Online Encyclopedia, Cisco Academy, Courses for CARNET System Engineers and Portal for System Engineers
- Internet Services: Hosting Service for Primary and Secondary Schools, CMS for Schools, Electronic Identity, Public Server, CARNET Debian, Virtual Servers, VOOPIX, www.hr, SmartX, E-mail, Webmail, Web Space, Domains, NTP, News and FTP.
- Multimedia: Room Videoconferences, Internet Transmission (streaming), Media on Demand and Adobe Connect Pro.
- Computer Security: Abuse Service, Content Filtering, Security Advice Vulnerability Test, Server Certificates, Security Advice and Mediation in Resolving Computer Incidents.
- Help and Support: User support service - helpdesk, Membership in the CARNET Network, Helpdesk for CARNET System Engineers and Membership in the CARNET Network.
