= Outline of Croatia =

Country in Central and Southeast Europe

The Flag of Croatia

The following outline is provided as an overview of and topical guide to Croatia:

The location of Croatia with its major cities labelled.

Croatia – unitary democratic parliamentary republic in Europe at the crossroads of Central Europe, the Balkans, and the Mediterranean. The country's population is 3.8 million, most of whom are Croats, with the most common religious denomination being Roman Catholicism. Croatia is a member of the European Union (since July 2013) and of NATO (since April 2009).

== General reference ==
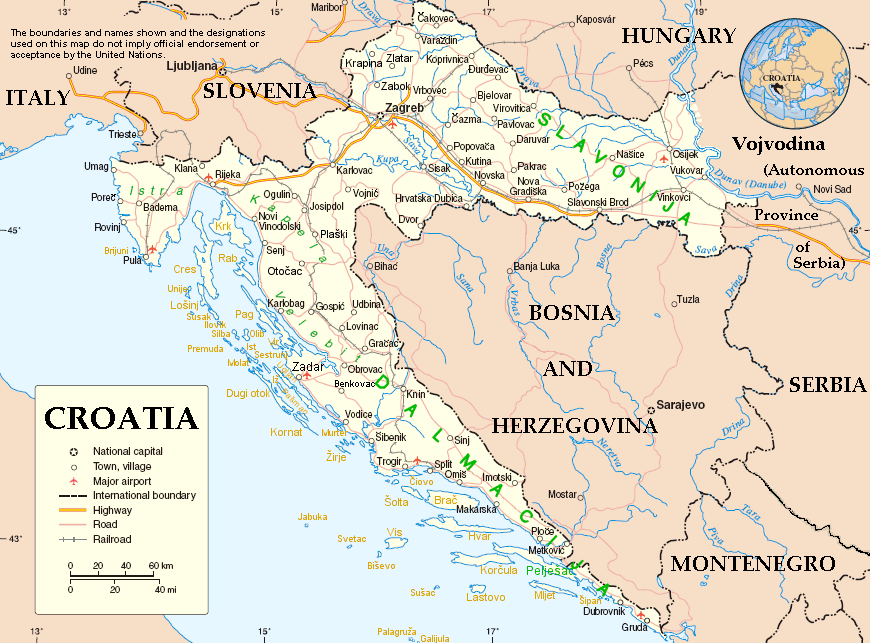
An enlargeable map of Croatia

- Pronunciation: /kroʊˈeɪʃə/
- Common English country name: Croatia
- Official English country name: Republic of Croatia
- Common endonym: Hrvatska
- Official endonym: Republika Hrvatska
- Adjectival(s): Croatian
- Demonym(s): Croat
- Etymology: Name of Croatia
- International rankings of Croatia
- ISO country codes: HR, HRV, 191
- ISO region codes: See ISO 3166-2:HR
- Internet country code top-level domain: .hr

== Geography of Croatia ==
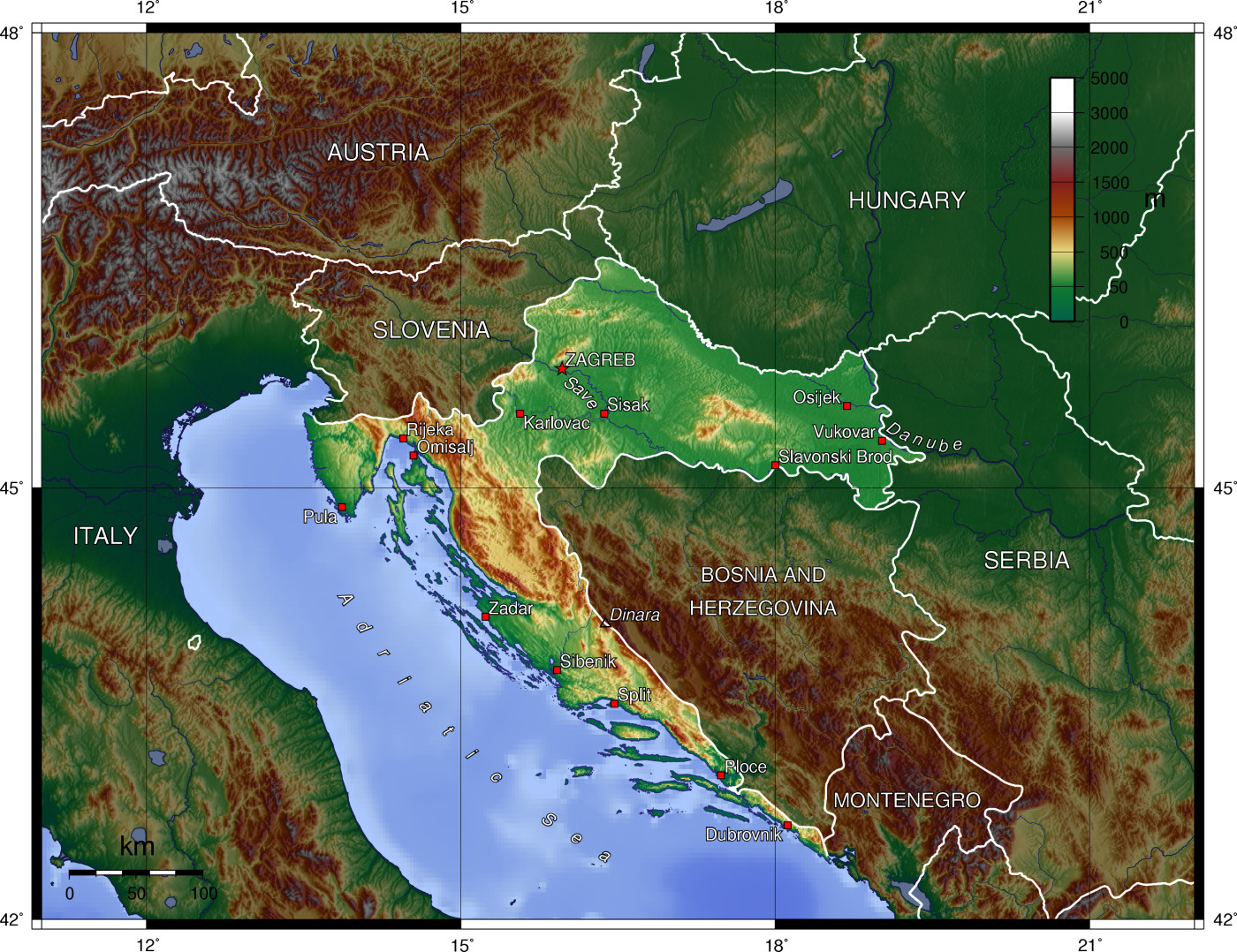
An enlargeable topographic map of Croatia

Geography of Croatia

- Croatia is: a country
  - Developed country
  - High income country
- Location:
  - Eastern Hemisphere
  - Northern Hemisphere
    - Eurasia
      - Europe
        - Southern Europe
          - Southeast Europe (known as "the Balkans")
        - Central Europe
  - Time zone: Central European Time (UTC+01), Central European Summer Time (UTC+02)
  - Extreme points of Croatia
    - High: Dinara 1,831 m (6,007 ft)
    - Low: Adriatic Sea 0 m
  - Land boundaries: 1,982 km

Bosnia and Herzegovina – 932 km
Slovenia – 455 km
Hungary – 329 km
Serbia – 241 km
Montenegro – 25 km

- Maritime boundaries: 595 km

Italy – 595 km

- Coastline: Adriatic Sea 5,835 km
- Population of Croatia: 3,827,227 (2026)
- Area of Croatia: 56,542 km^{2} (21,831 sq mi)
- Atlas of Croatia

=== Environment of Croatia ===
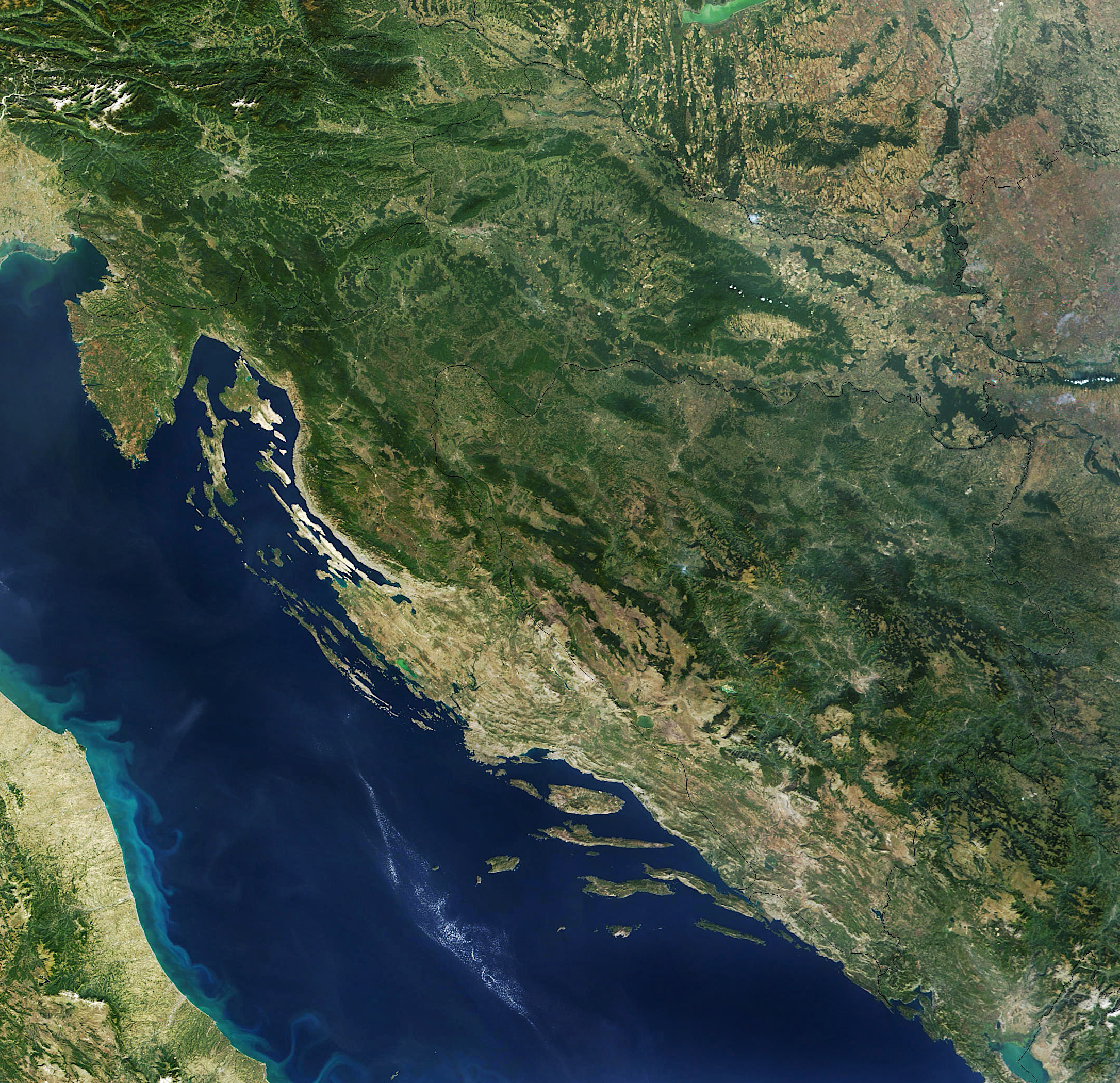
An enlargeable satellite image of Croatia

- Climate of Croatia
- Renewable energy in Croatia
- Geology of Croatia
- Protected areas of Croatia
  - National parks of Croatia
- Wildlife of Croatia
  - Fauna of Croatia
    - Birds of Croatia
    - Mammals of Croatia

==== Natural geographic features of Croatia ====
- Islands of Croatia
  - Inhabited islands of Croatia
- Lakes of Croatia
- Mountains of Croatia
- Rivers of Croatia
- World Heritage Sites in Croatia

=== Regions of Croatia ===
Regions of Croatia

- Central Croatia
- Dalmatia
- Istria
- Gorski Kotar
- Međimurje
- Slavonia
- Zagorje

==== Administrative divisions of Croatia ====
Administrative divisions of Croatia

- First level:
  - Counties of Croatia
  - City of Zagreb
- Second level:
  - Municipalities of Croatia
  - Cities of Croatia

===== List of counties of Croatia =====
Counties of Croatia

- Bjelovar-Bilogora County
- Brod-Posavina County
- Dubrovnik-Neretva County
- Istria County
- Karlovac County
- Koprivnica-Križevci County
- Krapina-Zagorje County
- Lika-Senj County
- Međimurje County
- Osijek-Baranja County
- Požega-Slavonia County
- Primorje-Gorski Kotar County
- Sisak-Moslavina County
- Split-Dalmatia County
- Šibenik-Knin County
- Varaždin County
- Virovitica-Podravina County
- Vukovar-Syrmia County
- Zadar County
- Zagreb County
- City of Zagreb

===== Municipalities of Croatia =====
Municipalities of Croatia

- Cities of Croatia

=== Demography of Croatia ===
Demographics of Croatia

- Croats

== Government and politics of Croatia ==
Politics of Croatia

- Form of government: parliamentary representative democratic republic
- Capital of Croatia: Zagreb
- Elections in Croatia
  - 2024 parliamentary election
  - 2024–25 presidential election
  - 2025 local elections
- Political parties in Croatia

=== Branches of government ===
==== Executive branch of the government of Croatia ====
- Head of state: President of Croatia, Zoran Milanović (2020–)
- Head of government: Prime Minister of Croatia, Andrej Plenković (2016–)
- Croatian Government

==== Legislative branch of the government of Croatia ====
- Croatian Parliament (unicameral)

==== Judicial branch of the government of Croatia ====
Court system of Croatia

- Constitutional Court of the Republic of Croatia
- Supreme Court of the Republic of Croatia

=== Foreign relations of Croatia ===
Foreign relations of Croatia

- Diplomatic missions in Croatia
- Diplomatic missions of Croatia

==== International organization membership ====
The Republic of Croatia is a member of:

- Australia Group
- Bank for International Settlements (BIS)
- Black Sea Economic Cooperation Zone (BSEC) (observer)
- Central European Initiative (CEI)
- Council of Europe (CE)
- European Union (EU) - EMU, EEA, ESM, Schengen Area
- Euro-Atlantic Partnership Council (EAPC)
- European Bank for Reconstruction and Development (EBRD)
- Food and Agriculture Organization (FAO)
- Inter-American Development Bank (IADB)
- International Atomic Energy Agency (IAEA)
- International Bank for Reconstruction and Development (IBRD)
- International Chamber of Commerce (ICC)
- International Civil Aviation Organization (ICAO)
- International Criminal Court (ICCt)
- International Criminal Police Organization (Interpol)
- International Development Association (IDA)
- International Federation of Red Cross and Red Crescent Societies (IFRCS)
- International Finance Corporation (IFC)
- International Fund for Agricultural Development (IFAD)
- International Hydrographic Organization (IHO)
- International Labour Organization (ILO)
- International Maritime Organization (IMO)
- International Mobile Satellite Organization (IMSO)
- International Monetary Fund (IMF)
- International Olympic Committee (IOC)
- International Organization for Migration (IOM)
- International Organization for Standardization (ISO)
- International Red Cross and Red Crescent Movement (ICRM)
- International Telecommunication Union (ITU)
- International Telecommunications Satellite Organization (ITSO)
- International Trade Union Confederation (ITUC)
- Inter-Parliamentary Union (IPU)
- Multilateral Investment Guarantee Agency (MIGA)
- Nonaligned Movement (NAM) (observer)
- North Atlantic Treaty Organization (NATO)
- Nuclear Suppliers Group (NSG)
- Organisation internationale de la Francophonie (OIF) (observer)
- Organization for Security and Cooperation in Europe (OSCE)
- Organisation for the Prohibition of Chemical Weapons (OPCW)
- Organization of American States (OAS) (observer)
- Permanent Court of Arbitration (PCA)
- Southeast European Cooperative Initiative (SECI)
- United Nations (UN)
- United Nations Conference on Trade and Development (UNCTAD)
- United Nations Educational, Scientific, and Cultural Organization (UNESCO)
- United Nations Industrial Development Organization (UNIDO)
- Universal Postal Union (UPU)
- Wassenaar Arrangement
- World Customs Organization (WCO)
- World Federation of Trade Unions (WFTU)
- World Health Organization (WHO)
- World Intellectual Property Organization (WIPO)
- World Meteorological Organization (WMO)
- World Tourism Organization (UNWTO)
- World Trade Organization (WTO)
- World Veterans Federation (WVF)
- Zangger Committee (ZC)

=== Law and order in Croatia ===
Law of Croatia

- Capital punishment in Croatia
- Constitution of Croatia
- Crime in Croatia
- Human rights in Croatia
  - LGBT rights in Croatia
  - Freedom of religion in Croatia
- Law enforcement in Croatia

=== Military of Croatia ===
Armed Forces of Croatia

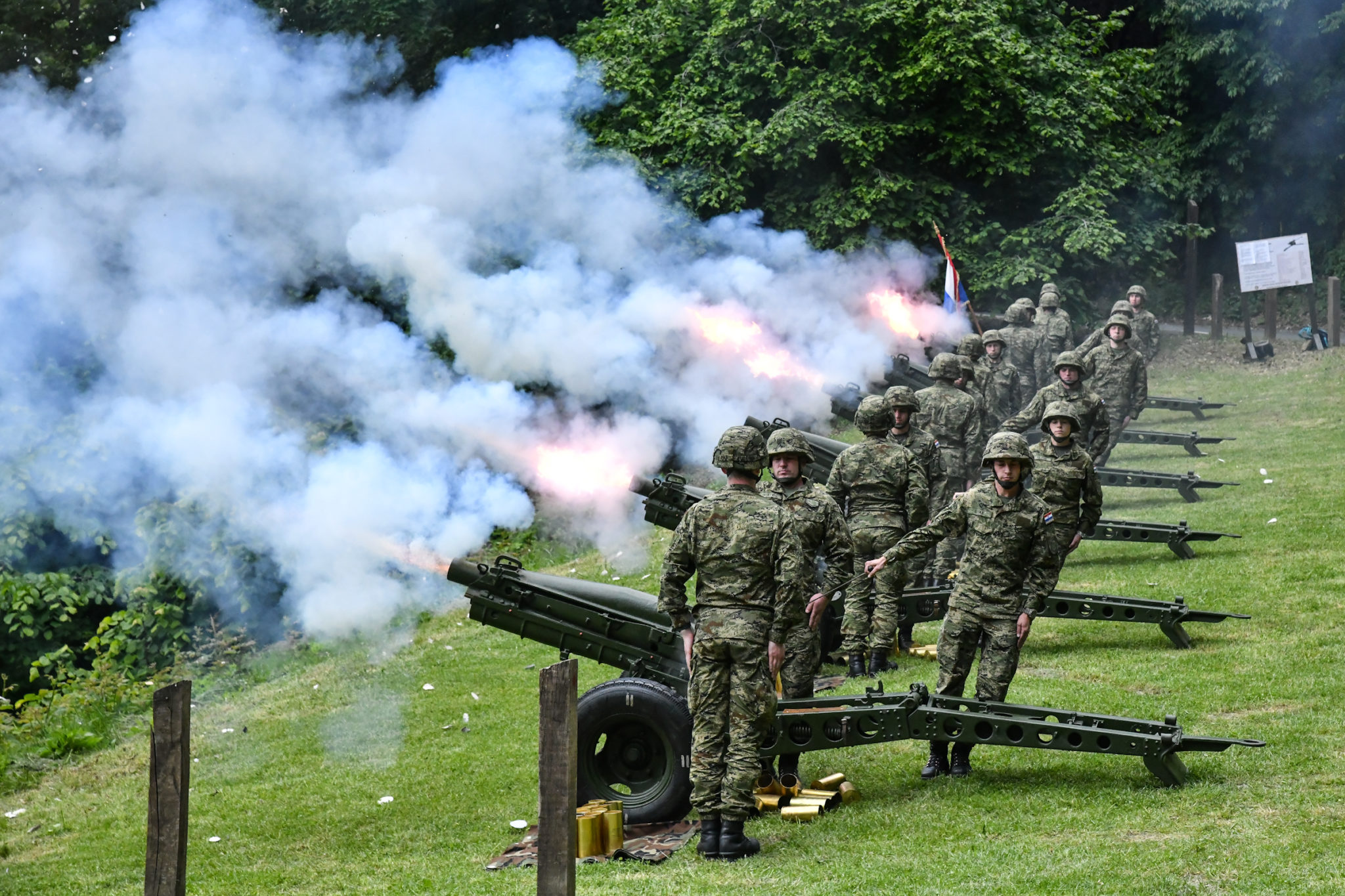
Croatian Army

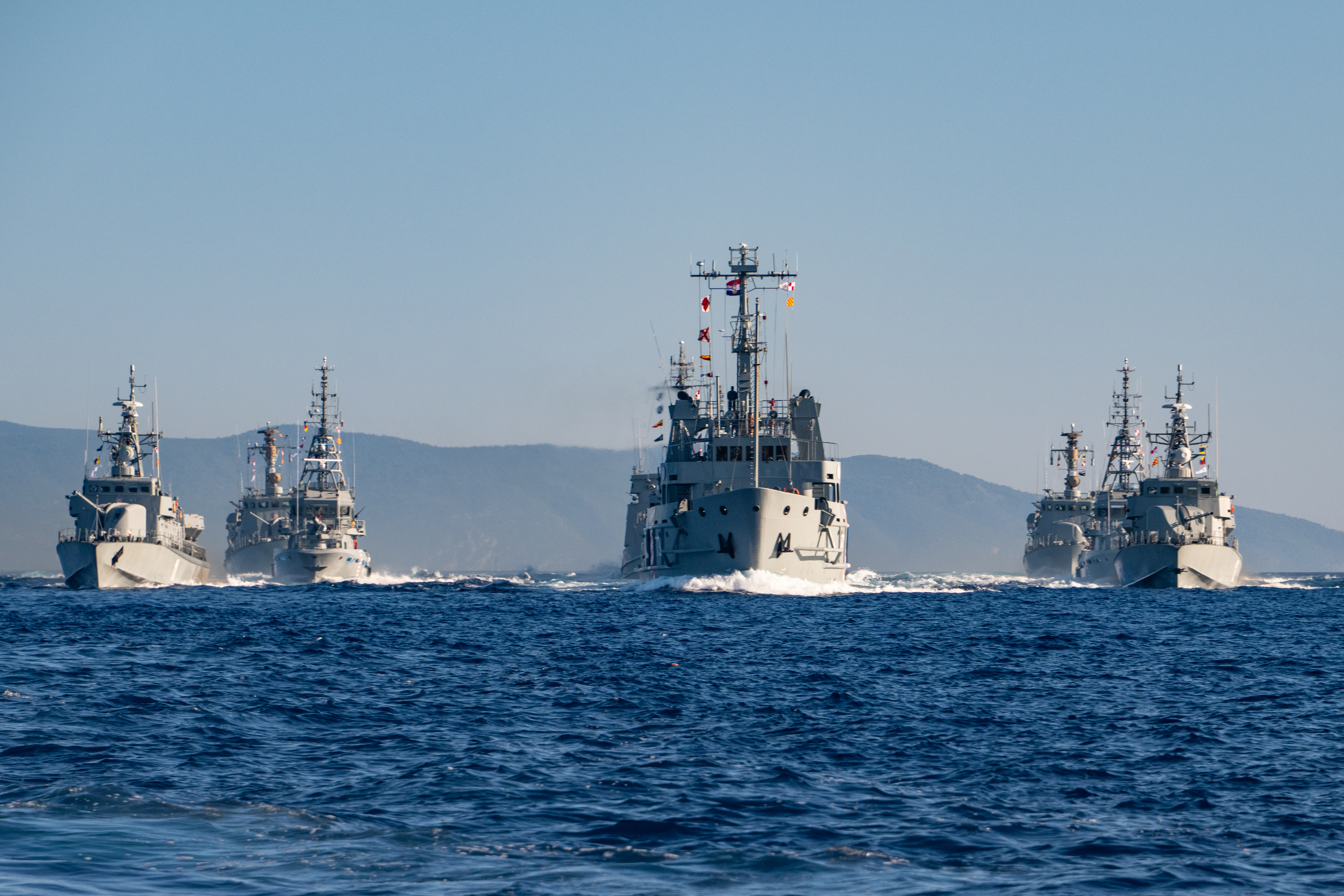
Croatian Navy

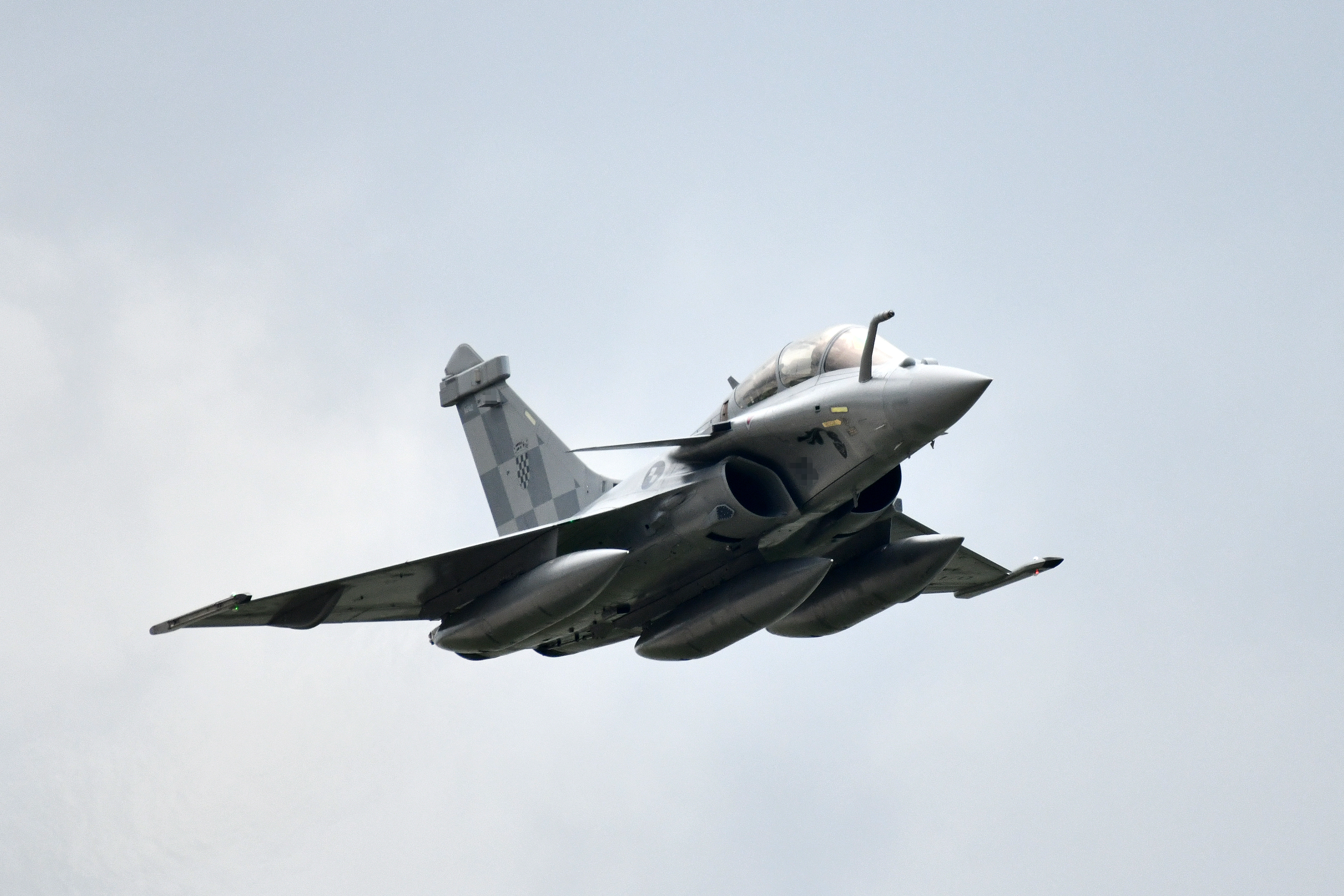
Croatian Air Force

- Command
  - Commander-in-chief: President Zoran Milanović
    - Ministry of Defence of Croatia: Minister Ivan Anušić
    - Chief of the General Staff: Colonel general Tihomir Kundid
- Service branches
  - Croatian Army
  - Croatian Navy
  - Croatian Air Force
  - Special forces of Croatia
- Conscription in Croatia
- Military history of Croatia
- Croatian military ranks

=== Local government in Croatia ===
Local government in Croatia

== History of Croatia ==
- Military history of Croatia

== Culture of Croatia ==
Culture of Croatia

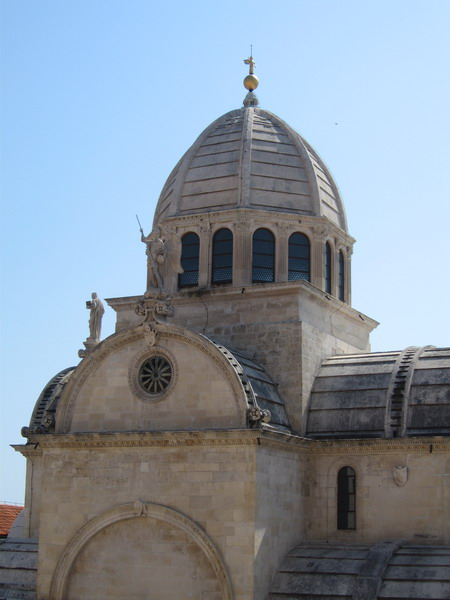
Šibenik Cathedral of St James, built 1431–1535, a World Heritage site

- Architecture of Croatia
- Cuisine of Croatia
- Ethnic minorities in Croatia
  - Czechs in Croatia
  - Germans of Croatia
  - Roma in Croatia
  - Serbs of Croatia
- Festivals in Croatia
- Languages of Croatia
- Marriage in Croatia
- Media in Croatia
- Museums in Croatia
- National symbols of Croatia
  - Coat of arms of Croatia
  - Flag of Croatia
  - National anthem of Croatia
- People of Croatia
- Prostitution in Croatia
- Public holidays in Croatia
- Records of Croatia
- Religion in Croatia
  - Roman Catholicism in Croatia
  - Buddhism in Croatia
  - Hinduism in Croatia
  - Islam in Croatia
  - Judaism in Croatia
  - Orthodoxy in Croatia
- Croatian Wine
- World Heritage Sites in Croatia

=== Art in Croatia ===
- Art of Croatia
- Cinema of Croatia
- Literature in Croatia
- Music of Croatia
- Television in Croatia
- Theatre in Croatia

=== Sports in Croatia ===
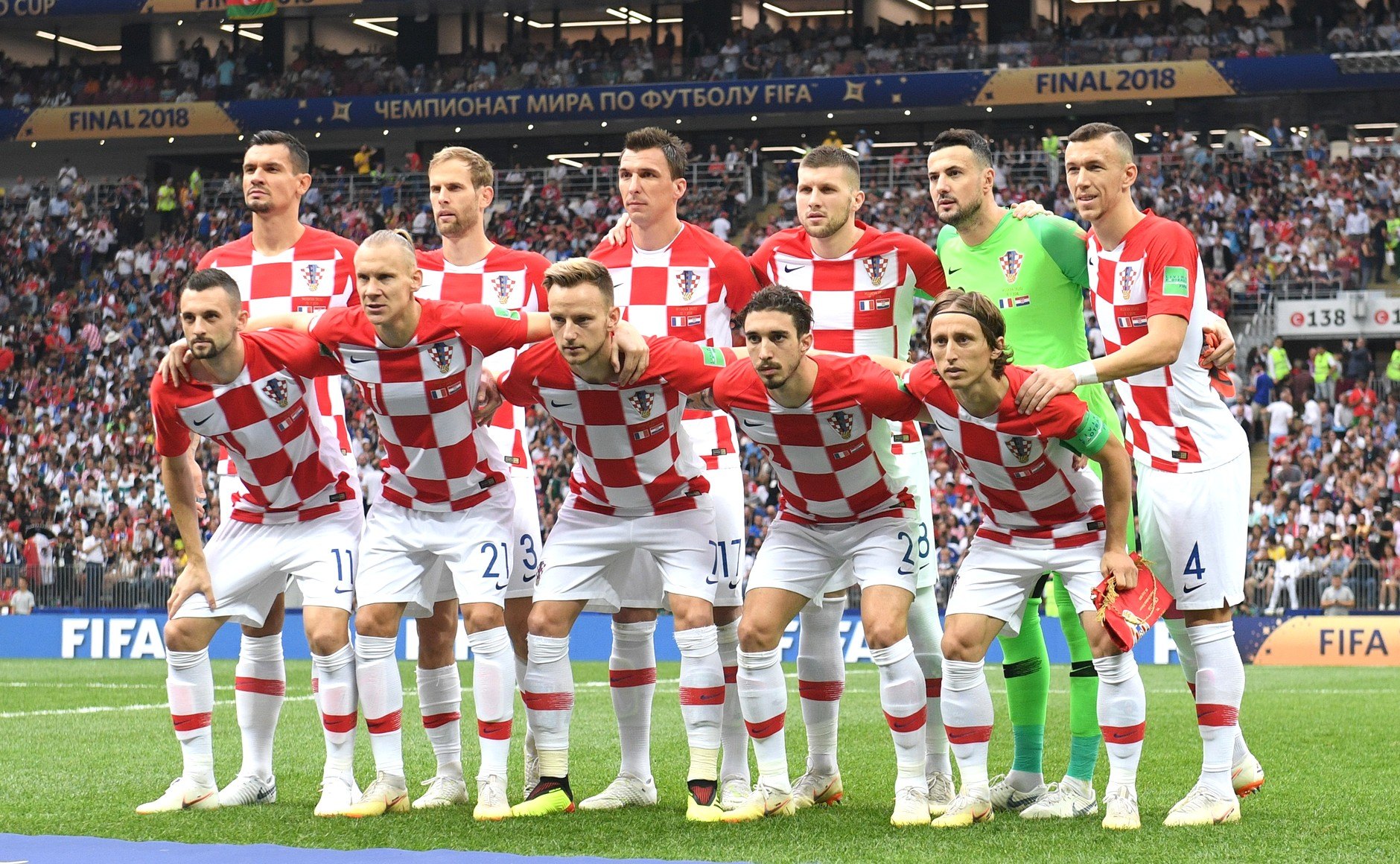
Croatia national football team in World Cup 2018 in Russia

Sports in Croatia

- Football in Croatia
  - Croatia national football team
  - Croatia at the FIFA World Cup
- Croatia at the Olympics
- 2009 World Men's Handball Championship

== Economy of Croatia ==
Economy of Croatia

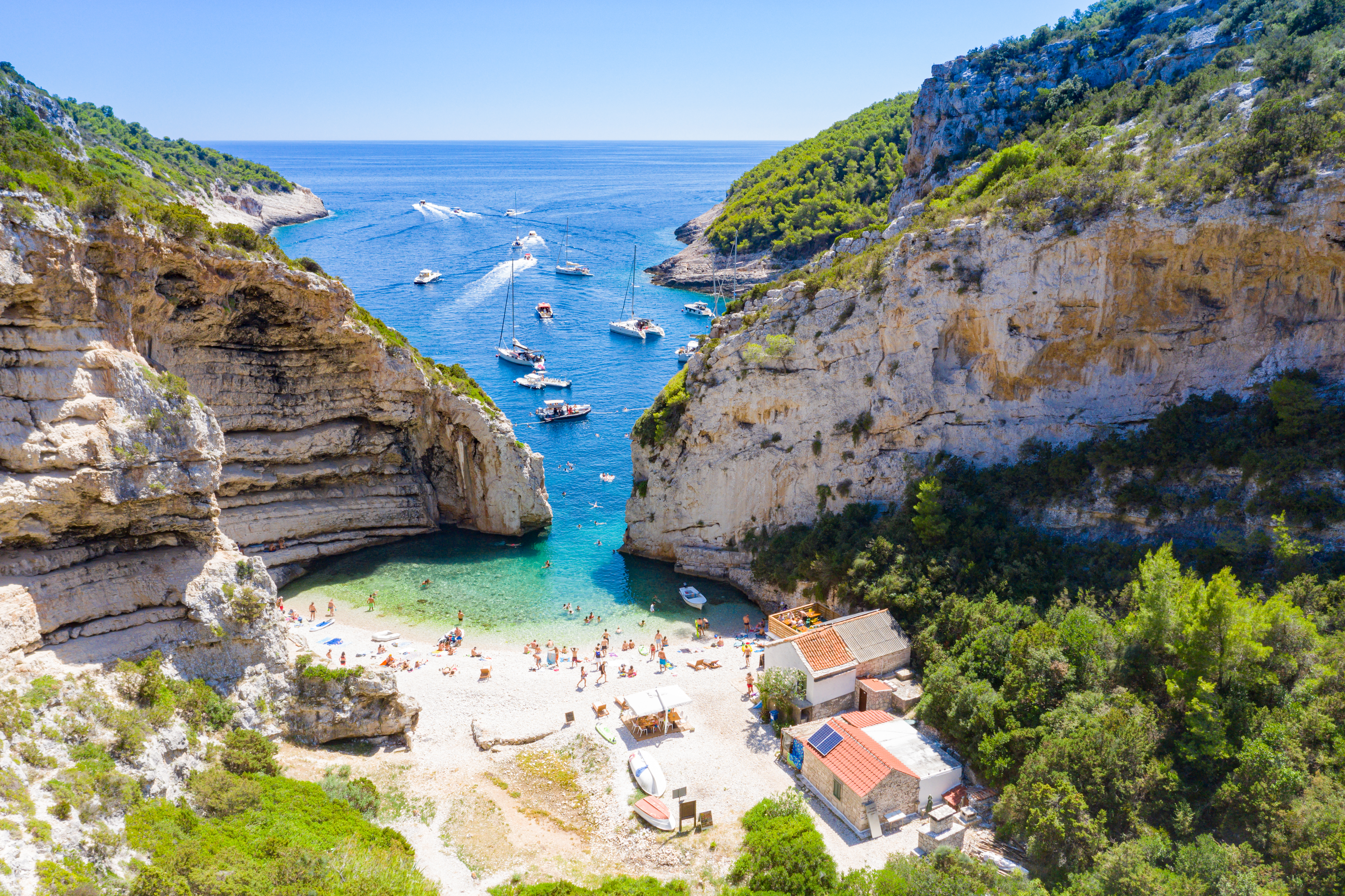
Tourism in Croatia is a major industry and economic sector.

- Economic rank, by nominal GDP: 68th (2026)
- Economic rank, by purchasing power GDP: 81st (2026)
- Croatian counties by GDP
- Croatian counties by living standard
- Agriculture in Croatia
- Banking in Croatia
  - National Bank of Croatia
  - Banks in Croatia
- Communications in Croatia
  - Internet in Croatia
- Companies of Croatia
- Currency of Croatia: Euro
  - ISO 4217: EUR
- Energy in Croatia
- Healthcare in Croatia
- Mining in Croatia
- Zagreb Stock Exchange
  - Varaždin Stock Exchange (defunct)
- Tourism in Croatia

== Infrastructure in Croatia ==
- Transportation in Croatia
  - Airports in Croatia
  - Rail transport in Croatia
  - Roads in Croatia
    - Highways in Croatia
    - State routes in Croatia

== Education in Croatia ==
Education in Croatia

- List of schools in Croatia
  - List of high schools in Croatia
- Institutions of higher education in Croatia
  - University of Zagreb
  - University of Split
  - University of Rijeka
  - University of Osijek
  - University of Zadar
  - University of Dubrovnik
  - University of Pula

== See also ==
- List of Croatia-related topics
- Outline of Slavic history and culture
- List of Slavic studies journals
