= Human trafficking in Croatia =

Croatia is a destination, source, and transit country for men, women, and children subjected to trafficking in persons, specifically conditions of forced prostitution and forced labor. Croatian women and girls fall victim to sex trafficking within the country, and women and girls from Serbia, Bosnia and Herzegovina, and other parts of Europe are subjected to forced prostitution in Croatia and in Europe. Men reportedly are subjected to forced labor in agricultural sectors, and children, including Roma, are subjected to conditions of forced begging and theft. In 2017, Taiwan women and men, as well as Croatian and Bosnian women, were subjected to forced labor and forced criminality in an illegal call center.

In 2010 the Croatian Government fully complied with the minimum standards for the elimination of trafficking. In 2009, the government continued to investigate and prosecute trafficking offenders, increased the minimum imposed penalty for convicted traffickers, and for the first time, ordered a trafficker to pay compensation to a victim. Croatia provided significant funding to NGOs providing assistance and shelter to trafficking victims during the reporting period and continued proactive training and outreach on victim identification. However, the government identified very few trafficking victims in 2009 and failed to protect some victim witnesses.

Human-rights activist, Jana Kohut also came forward with her story. She was trafficked to Slovenia from Croatia in 2004, for sexual exploitation. A female friend had tricked her, which lead to her abduction, and eventually being forced into prostitution and rape until she managed to escape a year later.

The International Centre for Migration Policy Development (ICMPD) publicized an assessment in September 2010, which focused on labour exploitation. With the help of data collected in 2007, 2008 and 2009, it was able to be determined that Croatia was no longer a transition destination but a source and destination country. The majority of victims being male, being trafficked and forced into labour. The two main forms of exploitation being first off prostitution, then secondly forced labour. Where as labour exploitation seems only to be less visible.

Croatia ratified the 2000 UN TIP Protocol in January 2003.

== Statistics in 2010 ==
Data collected by the Ministry of Interior of the Republic of Croatia:

Number of Victims of labour exploitation by gender (2007 – 2009):

Women	22%
Men	78%

Number of victims of labour exploitation by age:

18 - 25	3
26 - 39	4
40 - 60	1
60+	1

Number of victims of labour exploitation by citizenship:

Croatia	56%
Republic of Serbia	22%
Bosnia and Herzegovina	22%

Number of victims in various areas of exploitation:

Agriculture	4
Begging	3
Mechanic's shop	1
Car paint shop	1

Number of foreigners detected in illegal employment in Croatia:

Year	Mol	State Inspectorate
2007	2604	1377
2008	2060	880
2009	1665	593

== International response ==
In the U.S. State Department's Office to Monitor and Combat Trafficking in Persons Trafficking in Persons Report report of 2012, it was noted that the report by the Council of Europe's Group of Experts on Action against Trafficking in Human Beings (CoE-GRETA) concluded that the extent of trafficking in Croatia could be considerably higher than that identified by the government.

The U.S. State Department's 2017 report placed the country in "Tier 2".

The 2019 TIP report stated that the government had implemented measures to proactively identify trafficking indicators, increased funding for NGO shelters, and launched the 2018-2021 National Action Plan.

Croatia remained at Tier 2 in 2020. The government carried out awareness campaigns and thoroughly worked together with the Ministry of Interior (MOI) and the MDFYSP. Reports made about migrant abuse were denied by the MOI, who stated that internal investigations were done, despite claims from the society that the government did not constantly screen migrants for trafficking victims, as well as the lack of cooperation from migrants was caused by supposed police abuse.

The 2021 GRETA report noted that between 2015 and 2019, 200 victims were identified (50% of whom were women and 25% of whom were children).

Croatia remained at Tier 2 in 2023.

== Prosecution ==
The Croatian Government generally sustained its anti-trafficking law enforcement efforts in 2009, though it prosecuted only half as many traffickers as it did the previous year. It continued to exclusively use its human trafficking law to prosecute and convict sex and forced labor trafficking during the reporting period.

Croatia criminally prohibits trafficking for forced labor and commercial sexual exploitation through Criminal Provision 175 of its penal code. Provision 175 prescribes penalties for all forms of trafficking of one to 10 years’ imprisonment; these penalties are sufficiently stringent and are commensurate with those prescribed for rape. In 2009, the government investigated 13 suspected trafficking offenders, compared with 15 in 2008. It prosecuted six traffickers in 2009, a decrease from 12 prosecuted in 2008. Six trafficking offenders were convicted and given sentences ranging from two to eight years, compared with nine convictions obtained in 2008; however, one conviction was out on appeal and awaited a final verdict. Two of these convictions involved forced labor. In 2011, 37 suspects were investigated and 14 trafficking offenders were prosecuted in six cases. Seven of those offenders were convicted, where five fell under the trafficking statute and two cases were for forced pimping. That year, the police and border officials participated in a number of anti-trafficking training courses provided by the MOI.

The government increased its minimum imposed sentence for all trafficking convictions from one to two years during the reporting period. In the first civil trafficking case, the court ordered the trafficker to pay $28,466 in compensation to the victim. The government continued to provide general anti-trafficking training to police officers, and continued its “train-the-trainer” program involving 26 police officers training counterparts on ways to recognize and assist trafficking victims. There were no specific reports of trafficking-related complicity during the reporting period.

In 2018, the government conducted various investigations, including the largest trafficking case reported which involved 59 victims. During the 2018 reporting year, the government investigated nine cases, and prosecuted 12 defendants. In the reporting period of 2019, it was stated that there was a substantial backlog of criminal cases causing long delays in the court proceedings. Seven cases were investigated by law enforcement involving 22 victims, nine of those cases involved 17 suspects from 2017. The courts convicted five traffickers.

== Protection ==
The Government sustained significant efforts to ensure that victims of trafficking received access to necessary care. It continued to fund NGOs as well as its two specialized shelters for adult women and children trafficking victims, totaling $96,461 in 2009. It also provided $45,937 to NGOs to support and assist trafficking victims. Four victims used shelter facilities in 2009. While the government continued to emphasize a victim-centered approach, it identified only eight victims during the reporting period, one more than 2008, but lower than the 15 victims identified in 2007. In 2018, the government funded two NGO shelters, one for adults and one that specializes in children, which accommodated seven adults and one child in the reporting period. Additionally, the Ministry of Demographics, Family, Youth and Social Policy (MDFYSP) accommodated 14 child victims. The MDFYSP allocated 360,000 kunas ($57,785) to support the NGO shelters and an additional 63,00 kunas ($10,110) for monthly living allowances for victims. The Office for Human Rights and Rights of National Minorities (OHRRNM) allocated 20,000 kunas ($3,210) for direct assistance to victims.

The government amended its Law on Foreigners in March 2009 to extend the “reflection period” from 30 to 90 days; children continue to be eligible for a stay of 90 days. The government actively encouraged victim participation in trafficking cases and reported that all eight identified victims assisted in the investigation and prosecution of their traffickers in 2009. According to preliminary findings released in a January 2010 research project on trafficking and prostitution conducted between December 2008 and November 2009, the Croatian government did not provide adequate protections for some trafficking victims who testified against their traffickers. Researchers reported victims were required to testify repeatedly during trafficking trials; victim's testimony can be arranged via video-conference system. In 2018, the Office of the Chief State Prosecutor continued the instruction to not penalize victims, and seven Victim and Witness Support Offices at county courts provided assistance. The OHRRNM provided a number of pro bono legal counsel to victims, but it was reported that the lawyers were lacking in training for representing trafficking victims. The government provided training for police officers in victim-centered investigations, but it was reported that some judges lacked sensitivity and understanding of the psychological trauma impacting victims.

The government initiated a pilot assistance program for victim witnesses in four courts in 2009 to improve protections for these victims. Researchers also recommended that the government should intensify efforts to identify adequately all potential victims of forced prostitution. Although victims could be both witness and defendant in some court cases, researchers reported that the government made efforts to ensure that recognized trafficking victims were not penalized for unlawful acts committed as a direct result of their being trafficked.

In response to continued concerns about prostitution and potential trafficking during the high tourist season along the Adriatic coast, the government reported training over 250 police officers in coastal cities during 2009. Although police reported conducting 10 anti-trafficking operations along the coast in 2009, the government did not identify any trafficking victims as a result of these operations. The government provided foreign victims with legal alternatives to their removal to countries where they may face hardship or retribution. Out of the four foreign trafficking victims identified in 2009, the government repatriated one female to Bosnia and Herzegovina and three to Serbia.

== Prevention ==
In 2009, the government continued its progressive national-level outreach and anti-trafficking training efforts to raise awareness and prevent trafficking. During the reporting period, it implemented numerous anti-trafficking education workshops and seminars for Croatian authorities, including social workers, diplomatic and consular staff, judges, prosecutors, police, and students, including members of mobile teams responsible for assisting trafficking victims. In November 2009, it organized a seminar for leaders in the tourism industry on ways to identify victims of trafficking. It continued to conduct anti-trafficking training for Croatian soldiers prior to their deployment to Afghanistan as international peacekeepers.

A new National Plan for Combating Trafficking in Persons was implemented by the Croatian government in February 2012. In 2011, various anti-trafficking awareness campaigns were carried out by the government, three of which were broadcast, anti-trafficking, public service announcements. Additional efforts where placed into the EU Anti-Trafficking Day. In connection with Croatia becoming a member of the European Union, tens of millions of euros of European assistance funds have been used to improve the border infrastructure, modernize equipment and train police officers. The EU border management agency Frontex reported about 35,000 people caught in illegal border crossings in that region for 2013, more than 33% higher than the previous year.

In September 2015, the Croatian President asked the army to be prepared to respond and assist at the border, in order to slow the entrance of illegal immigrants, mostly from Serbia, making their way through Croatia since the Hungarian police closed the border crossing between Hungary and Serbia. Croatian activists and NGO's asked for assistance and safe passage for the refugees in the EU, the majority that were entering into the country plan to travel onwards to Western Europe, of the 75 000 that had entered, less than 10 had asked for asylum. With the ongoing influx of refugees, Croatia's surrounding countries announced plans to close up borders with fences and tighten the rail controls to slow the trafficking of humans through Slovenia, to Austria and Germany.

In 2018, the government reported that it was still lacking a national action plan. The OHRRNM served as the secretariat for the senior-level national coordinating committee, and reported that there is a lacking in resources as well as staff. The OHRRNM allocated 197,000 kunas ($31,620) for prevention efforts in 2016 and 2017. The OHRRNM added an NGO and the Labor inspectorate into the senior-level national coordination committee the following year, and adopted the 2018-2021 national action plan.

== See also ==
- Human rights in Croatia
- Prostitution in Croatia
- Human trafficking in Europe
