= Geology of Croatia =

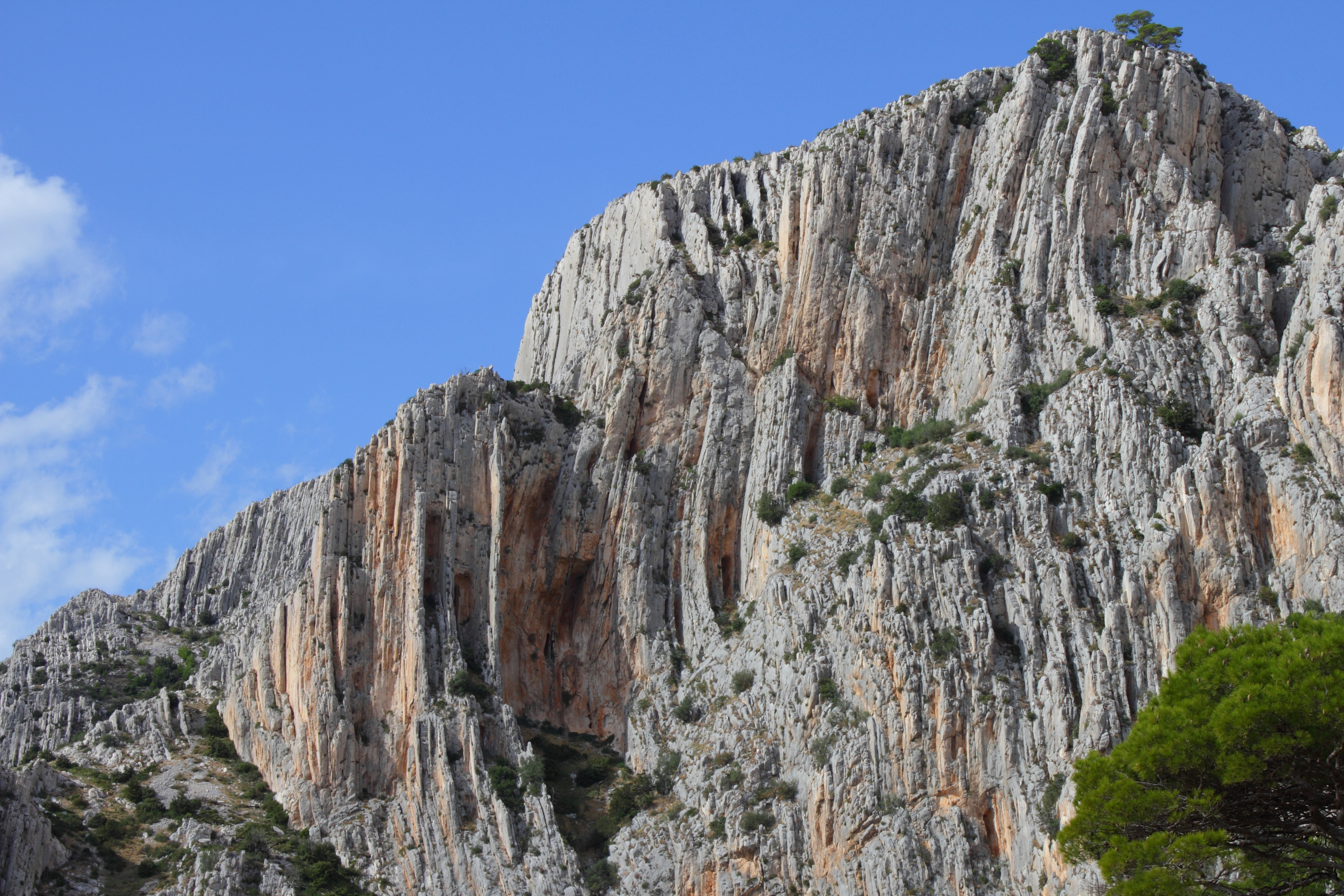
Vertical sedimentary rock layers on the island of Hvar, 2012

The geology of Croatia is predominately composed of rock formations from the Precambrian period. Much of this land is covered by younger sedimentary rocks and deformed or superimposed by tectonic activity. The country is split into two main onshore provinces: a smaller part of the Pannonian Basin and the larger Dinaric Alps. The carbonate platform karst landscape helped create the weathering conditions that form bauxite, gypsum, clay, spilite, and limestone.

== Geography ==
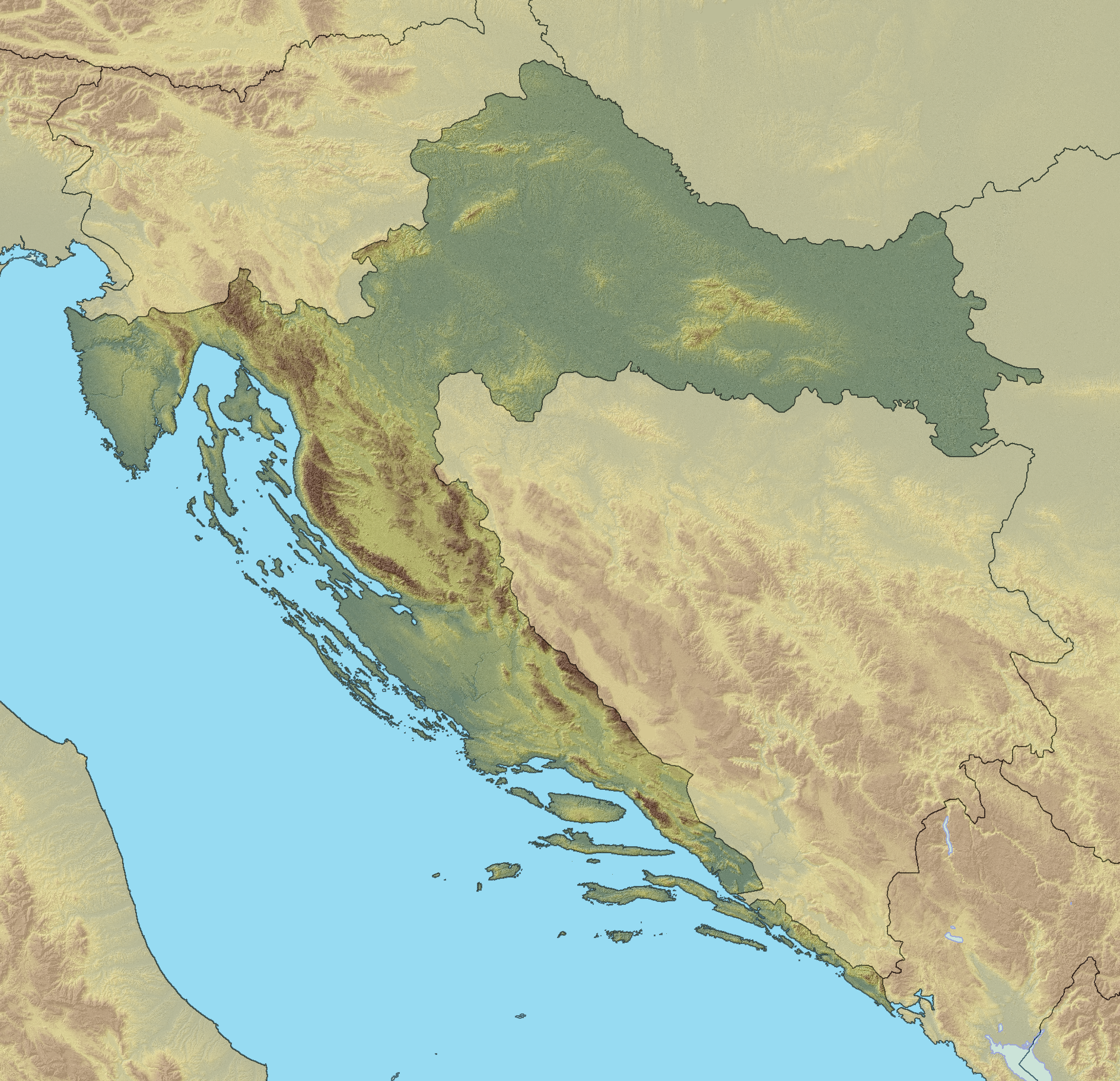
Relief map of Croatia

The territory covers 56,594 square kilometres (21,851 square miles), consisting of 56,414 square kilometres (21,782 square miles) of land and 128 square kilometres (49 square miles) of water. Elevation ranges from the mountains of the Dinaric Alps with the highest point of the Dinara peak at 1,831 metres (6,007 feet) near the border with Bosnia and Herzegovina in the south to the shore of the Adriatic Sea which makes up its entire southwest border. Insular Croatia consists of over a thousand islands and islets varying in size, 48 of which permanently inhabited. The largest islands are Cres and Krk, each of them having an area of around 405 square kilometres (156 square miles). Karst topography makes up about half of Croatia and is especially prominent in the Dinaric Alps. There are several deep caves in Croatia, 49 of which deeper than 250 m (820.21 ft), 14 of them deeper than 500 m (1,640.42 ft) and three deeper than 1,000 m (3,280.84 ft). Croatia's most famous lakes are the Plitvice lakes, a system of 16 lakes with waterfalls connecting them over dolomite and limestone cascades. The lakes are renowned for their distinctive colours, ranging from turquoise to mint green, grey or blue.

== Pannonian Basin ==
The Pannonian Basin (marked III.), enclosed by the Carpathian Mountains and the Transylvanian Plateau (IV.) to the east and north. Croatia is the country marked as HR. Also shown: the Romanian Lowlands (II.) and the Outer Subcarpathian depressions (I.) beyond the Carpathians (also known as Transcarpathia)

The Pannonian Basin, or Carpathian Basin, is a large basin in Central Europe. The basin mostly is centered on the territory of modern Hungary, but also covers regions of western Slovakia, southeastern Poland, western Ukraine, western Romania, northern Serbia, the tip of northeast Croatia (Slavonia), northeastern Slovenia (Prekmurje), and eastern Austria. The Pannonian Basin is located within the arcuate Carpathian Mountains that encircle the basin; this chain joins the Alpine mountain system to the west and the Dinaric mountain system to the southwest. The basin is bounded by the intra-Carpathian mountain ranges and basement uplifts. The Croatian sector of the basin has an area of 26,000 square kilometres (10,000 mi^{2}) and is broken into 4 main sub-basins – Sava, Drava, Northwest Croatia and Slavonija. Evidence of the Carboniferous Variscan orogeny remains in Mt. Papuk in the east. The basement is pre-Permian and is made of igneous, metamorphic and sedimentary rocks, with granites, gneisses, schists, and various low-grade metamorphic rocks and seem to have been affected by the Caledonian and Variscan orogenies. In the Pannonian area, Neogene material lies on top of older bedrock, emplaced on the periphery of the Paratethys Ocean. Neogene rocks include marl, conglomerate and sandstone as well as andesite and tuff. In the Drava River valley, the Neogene is seven kilometres thick. Many units contain lignite, and oil is found in lower units.

== Dinarides ==
Croatia is mostly formed as a part of the Dinarides. The Dinaride region lies outside of the Pannonian Basin to the Southwest. The Dinarides is a mountain range in Southern and Southeastern Europe, separating the continental Balkan Peninsula from the Adriatic Sea. They stretch from Italy in the northwest through Slovenia, Croatia, Bosnia and Herzegovina, Serbia, Montenegro. The Dinaric Alps extend for approximately 645 kilometres (401 mi) along the western Balkan peninsula from the Julian Alps to the northwest in Italy, downwards to the Šar and Korab massif, where their direction changes. The Dinarides are a wide NW-SE fold-and-thrust belt stretching from southwestern Slovenia to Montenegro along the Adriatic coast of Croatia and inland.

=== Formation ===
The Dinarides formed by subduction and collision processes in the border zone between Eurasian Plate and Adriatic Plate. The Adriatic Plate is still pushing the Cenozoic carbonate rocks up on top of the Adriatic lithosphere. Ultramafic ophiolite formed with the opening of a branch of the Tethys Ocean in the Cretaceous, followed by a magmatic activity. With continued continental subduction in the Paleogene, uplift began. The Adriatic Sea is a carbonate platform structural belt with Mesozoic-Paleogene flysch, chert, and limestone superimposed on it. Cenozoic Paleogene rocks unconformably overlie Cretaceous rocks with bauxite, coal and freshwater limestone, overlain by marine limestone from the Eocene and flysch formed in a trough between two carbonate platforms. Sandstone, marl, and limestone deposited in basins now beneath the Adriatic Sea during the Neogene.

=== Adriatic Plate ===
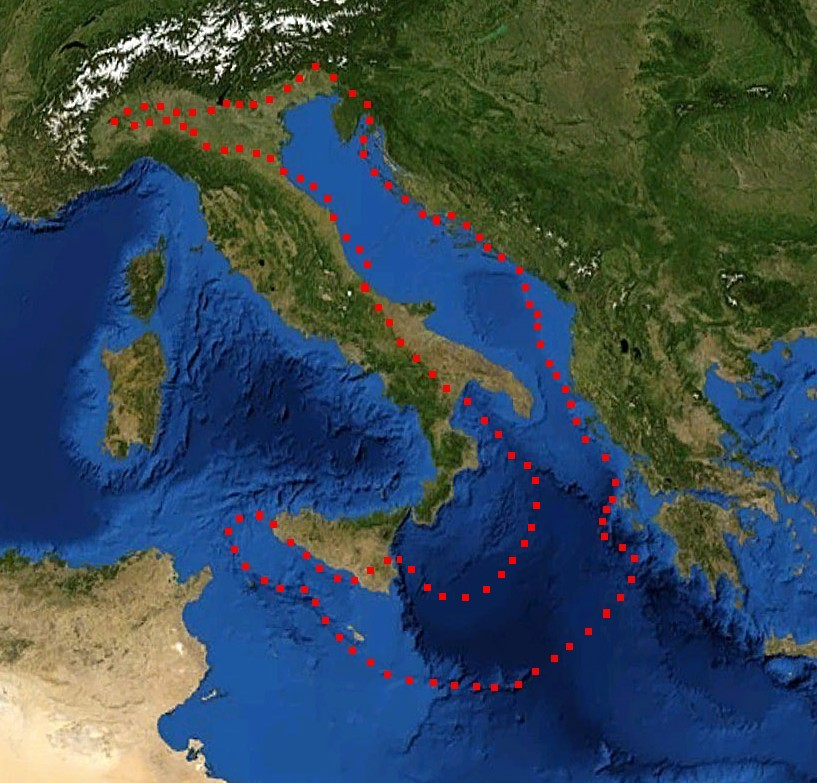
Adriatic Microplate boundaries

The Adriatic Sea and the Po Valley are associated with a tectonic microplate—identified as the Apulian or Adriatic Plate that separated from the African Plate during the Mesozoic era. This separation began in the Middle and Late Triassic, when limestone began to be deposited in the area. Between the Norian and Late Cretaceous, the Adriatic and Apulia Carbonate Platforms formed as a thick series of carbonate sediments (dolomites and limestones), up to 8,000 metres (26,000 ft) deep. Remnants of the former are found in the Adriatic Sea, as well as in the southern Alps and the Dinaric Alps, and remnants of the latter are seen as the Gargano Promontory and the Maiella mountain. In the Eocene and early Oligocene, the plate moved north and north-east, contributing to the Alpine orogeny (along with the African and Eurasian Plates' movements) via the tectonic uplift of the Dinarides and Alps. In the Late Oligocene, the motion was reversed and the Apennine Mountains' orogeny took place. An unbroken zone of increased seismic activity borders the Adriatic Sea, with a belt of thrust faults generally oriented in the northeast–southwest direction on the east coast and the northeast–southwest normal faults in the Apennines, indicating an Adriatic counterclockwise rotation.

An active 200-kilometre (120 mi) fault has been identified to the northwest of Dubrovnik, adding to the Dalmatian islands as the Eurasian Plate slides over the Adriatic microplate. Furthermore, the fault causes the Apennine peninsula's southern tip to move towards the opposite shore by about 0.4 centimetres (0.16 in) per year. If this movement continues, the seafloor will be completely consumed and the Adriatic Sea closed off in 50–70 million years. In the Northern Adriatic, the coast of the Gulf of Trieste and western Istria is gradually subsiding, having sunk about 1.5 metres (4 ft 11 in) in the past two thousand years. In the Middle Adriatic Basin, there is evidence of Permian volcanism in the area of Komiža on the island of Vis and the volcanic islands of Jabuka and Brusnik. Earthquakes have been observed in the region since the earliest historical records. A recent strong earthquake in the region was the 1979 Montenegro earthquake, measuring 7.0 on the Richter scale. Historical earthquakes in the area include the 1627 Gargano peninsula and the 1667 Dubrovnik earthquakes, both followed by strong tsunamis. In the last 600 years, fifteen tsunamis have occurred in the Adriatic Sea.

== Natural resources ==
As part of its broader geology, the leading natural resources of Croatia include water, oil, gas, and coal. Bauxite, clays, coal, gypsum, mica, natural asphalt, petroleum, and salt are all naturally occurring in the country. It has vast amounts water through its access to the Adriatic Sea as well as extensive systems of lakes.

The town of Rude was a major source of copper as early as the 16th century, while the towns of Zrinski and Kraševi Zviri, produced metallic ore and zinc, respectively. Istria has mines dedicated to vitriol and alum. From 1811, there was a sulfur mine in Radoboj.

== See also ==
- Energy in Croatia
