= List of birds of Croatia =

This is a list of the bird species recorded in Croatia. The avifauna of Croatia include a total of 416 species, of which 3 have been introduced by humans. 23 species are globally threatened.

This list's taxonomic treatment (designation and sequence of orders, families and species) and nomenclature (common and scientific names) follow the conventions of The Clements Checklist of Birds of the World, 2022 edition. The family accounts at the beginning of each heading reflect this taxonomy, as do the species counts found in each family account. Introduced and accidental species are included in the total counts for Croatia.

The following tags have been used to highlight several categories. The commonly occurring native species do not fall into any of these categories.

- (A) Accidental - a species that rarely or accidentally occurs in Croatia
- (I) Introduced - a species introduced to Croatia as a consequence, direct or indirect, of human actions
- (Ex) Extirpated - a species that no longer occurs in Croatia although populations exist elsewhere

== Ducks, geese, and waterfowl ==
Order: Anseriformes Family: Anatidae

Anatidae includes the ducks and most duck-like waterfowl, such as geese and swans. These birds are adapted to an aquatic existence with webbed feet, flattened bills, and feathers that are excellent at shedding water due to an oily coating.

Common and binomial names	Image	Status in Croatia	Regional IUCN status
Bar-headed goose (Anser indicus)		(A) Accidental vagrant	LC – least concern (Croatia)
Greylag goose (Anser anser)		Fairly common winter visitor	LC – least concern (Croatia)
Greater white-fronted goose (Anser albifrons)		Regular winter visitor	LC – least concern (Croatia)
Lesser white-fronted goose (Anser erythropus)		(A) Rare accidental vagrant	VU – vulnerable (Croatia)
Taiga bean goose (Anser fabalis)		Scarce winter visitor	LC – least concern (Croatia)
Tundra bean goose (Anser serrirostris)		Scarce winter visitor	LC – least concern (Croatia)
Pink-footed goose (Anser brachyrhynchus)		(A) Accidental vagrant	LC – least concern (Croatia)
Brant (Branta bernicla)		(A) Accidental vagrant	LC – least concern (Croatia)
Barnacle goose (Branta leucopsis)		(A) Accidental vagrant	LC – least concern (Croatia)
Canada goose (Branta canadensis)		(A) Accidental vagrant	LC – least concern (Croatia)
Red-breasted goose (Branta ruficollis)		(A) Rare accidental vagrant	VU – vulnerable (Croatia)
Mute swan (Cygnus olor)		Common breeding resident	LC – least concern (Croatia)
Black swan (Cygnus atratus)		(A) Accidental escapee	LC – least concern (Croatia)
Tundra swan (Cygnus columbianus)		(A) Accidental vagrant	LC – least concern (Croatia)
Whooper swan (Cygnus cygnus)		Scarce winter visitor	LC – least concern (Croatia)
Egyptian goose (Alopochen aegyptiaca)		(A) Accidental vagrant	LC – least concern (Croatia)
Ruddy shelduck (Tadorna ferruginea)		(A) Accidental vagrant	LC – least concern (Croatia)
Common shelduck (Tadorna tadorna)		Regular breeder and migrant	LC – least concern (Croatia)
Garganey (Spatula querquedula)		Common breeding summer visitor	LC – least concern (Croatia)
Northern shoveler (Spatula clypeata)		Breeding summer visitor	LC – least concern (Croatia)
Gadwall (Mareca strepera)		Breeding summer visitor	LC – least concern (Croatia)
Eurasian wigeon (Mareca penelope)		Winter visitor	LC – least concern (Croatia)
Mallard (Anas platyrhynchos)		Abundant breeding resident	LC – least concern (Croatia)
Northern pintail (Anas acuta)		Scarce winter visitor	LC – least concern (Croatia)
Common teal (Anas crecca)		Common winter visitor	LC – least concern (Croatia)
Red-crested pochard (Netta rufina)		Scarce breeder and migrant	LC – least concern (Croatia)
Common pochard (Aythya ferina)		Scarce breeder and winter visitor	VU – vulnerable (Croatia)
Ferruginous duck (Aythya nyroca)		Scarce breeder and migrant	NT – near threatened (Croatia)
Tufted duck (Aythya fuligula)		Common winter visitor	LC – least concern (Croatia)
Greater scaup (Aythya marila)		Scarce winter visitor	LC – least concern (Croatia)
Common eider (Somateria mollissima)		(A) Accidental vagrant	LC – least concern (Croatia)
Harlequin duck (Histrionicus histrionicus)		(A) Accidental vagrant	LC – least concern (Croatia)
Velvet scoter (Melanitta fusca)		Scarce winter visitor	VU – vulnerable (Croatia)
Common scoter (Melanitta nigra)		(A) Accidental vagrant	LC – least concern (Croatia)
Long-tailed duck (Clangula hyemalis)		(A) Accidental vagrant	VU – vulnerable (Croatia)
Common goldeneye (Bucephala clangula)		Regular winter visitor	LC – least concern (Croatia)
Smew (Mergellus albellus)		Scarce winter visitor	LC – least concern (Croatia)
Common merganser (Mergus merganser)		Scarce winter visitor	LC – least concern (Croatia)
Red-breasted merganser (Mergus serrator)		Scarce winter visitor	LC – least concern (Croatia)
White-headed duck (Oxyura leucocephala)		(A) Rare accidental vagrant	EN – endangered (Croatia)

== Pheasants, grouse, and allies ==
Order: Galliformes Family: Phasianidae

The Phasianidae are a family of terrestrial birds. In general, they are plump (although they vary in size) and have broad, relatively short wings.

Common and binomial names	Image	Status in Croatia	Regional IUCN status
Common quail (Coturnix coturnix)		Common breeding summer visitor	NT – near threatened (Europe)
Rock partridge (Alectoris graeca)		Localized breeding resident (6,000–10,000 pairs, declining)	NT – near threatened (Europe)
Common pheasant (Phasianus colchicus)		I – Introduced, abundant breeding resident	LC – least concern (Europe)
Grey partridge (Perdix perdix)		Fairly common breeding resident	LC – least concern (Europe)
Western capercaillie (Tetrao urogallus)		Scarce, highly localized breeding resident (50–100 pairs)	VU – vulnerable (Croatia)
Black grouse (Lyrurus tetrix)		Ex – Extirpated; formerly bred in Croatia, now vanished	RE – regionally extinct (Croatia)
Hazel grouse (Tetrastes bonasia)		Scarce localized breeding resident	LC – least concern (Europe)

== Flamingos ==
Order: Phoenicopteriformes Family: Phoenicopteridae

Flamingos are gregarious wading birds, usually 3 to 5 feet (0.9 to 1.5 m) tall, found in both the Western and Eastern Hemispheres. Flamingos filter-feed on shellfish and algae. Their oddly shaped beaks are specially adapted to separate mud and silt from the food they consume and, uniquely, are used upside-down.

Common and binomial names	Image	Status in Croatia	Regional IUCN status
Greater flamingo (Phoenicopterus roseus)		Scarce but increasing visitor, occasional breeder in wetlands	LC – least concern (Croatia)

== Grebes ==
Order: Podicipediformes Family: Podicipedidae

Grebes are small to medium-large freshwater diving birds. They have lobed toes and are excellent swimmers and divers. However, they have their feet placed far back on the body, making them quite ungainly on land.

Common and binomial names	Image	Status in Croatia	Regional IUCN status
Little grebe (Tachybaptus ruficollis)		Common breeding resident in wetlands	LC – least concern (Croatia)
Horned grebe (Podiceps auritus)		Rare winter visitor	VU – vulnerable (Croatia)
Red-necked grebe (Podiceps grisegena)		Scarce winter visitor	LC – least concern (Croatia)
Great crested grebe (Podiceps cristatus)		Common breeding resident in lakes and rivers	LC – least concern (Croatia)
Eared grebe (Podiceps nigricollis)		Scarce breeder and migrant	NT – near threatened (Croatia)

== Pigeons and doves ==
Order: Columbiformes Family: Columbidae

Pigeons and doves are stout-bodied birds with short necks and short slender bills with a fleshy cere.

Common and binomial names	Image	Status in Croatia	Regional IUCN status
Rock pigeon (Columba livia)		Common resident, most populations are feral, uncertain whether wild populations still exist	LC – least concern (Croatia)
Stock dove (Columba oenas)		Scarce breeder in woodlands	LC – least concern (Croatia)
Common wood pigeon (Columba palumbus)		Common breeding resident	LC – least concern (Croatia)
European turtle dove (Streptopelia turtur)		Scarce breeder, declining population	VU – vulnerable (Croatia)
Oriental turtle dove (Streptopelia orientalis)		(A) Accidental vagrant	LC – least concern (Croatia)
Eurasian collared dove (Streptopelia decaocto)		Common breeding resident, widespread in towns and villages	LC – least concern (Croatia)

== Sandgrouse ==
Order: Pterocliformes Family: Pteroclidae

Sandgrouse have small, pigeon like heads and necks, but sturdy compact bodies. They have long pointed wings and sometimes tails and a fast direct flight. Flocks fly to watering holes at dawn and dusk. Their legs are feathered down to the toes.

Common and binomial names	Image	Status in Croatia	Regional IUCN status
Pallas's sandgrouse (Syrrhaptes paradoxus)		(A) Accidental vagrant, extremely rare irruptive visitor	LC – least concern (Croatia)

== Bustards ==
Order: Otidiformes Family: Otididae

Bustards are large terrestrial birds mainly associated with dry open country and steppes in the Old World. They are omnivorous and nest on the ground. They walk steadily on strong legs and big toes, pecking for food as they go. They have long broad wings with "fingered" wingtips and striking patterns in flight. Many have interesting mating displays.

Common and binomial names	Image	Status in Croatia	Regional IUCN status
Great bustard (Otis tarda)		Former breeder, now extirpated in Croatia	RE – regionally extinct (Croatia)
Little bustard (Tetrax tetrax)		(A) Accidental vagrant, formerly bred but now absent	RE – regionally extinct (Croatia)

== Cuckoos ==
Order: Cuculiformes Family: Cuculidae

The family Cuculidae includes cuckoos, roadrunners and anis. These birds are of variable size with slender bodies, long tails and strong legs.

Common and binomial names	Image	Status in Croatia	Regional IUCN status
Great spotted cuckoo (Clamator glandarius)		Rare and localized resident breeder, Scarce summer migrant	LC – least concern (Croatia)
Common cuckoo (Cuculus canorus)		Widespread breeding summer visitor	LC – least concern (Croatia)

== Nightjars and allies ==
Order: Caprimulgiformes Family: Caprimulgidae

Nightjars are medium-sized nocturnal birds that usually nest on the ground. They have long wings, short legs and very short bills. Most have small feet, of little use for walking, and long pointed wings. Their soft plumage is camouflaged to resemble bark or leaves.

Common and binomial names	Image	Status in Croatia	Regional IUCN status
Red-necked nightjar (Caprimulgus ruficollis)		(A) Accidental vagrant	LC – least concern (Croatia)
Eurasian nightjar (Caprimulgus europaeus)		Widespread breeding summer visitor	LC – least concern (Croatia)

== Swifts ==
Order: Caprimulgiformes Family: Apodidae

Swifts are small birds which spend the majority of their lives flying. These birds have very short legs and never settle voluntarily on the ground, perching instead only on vertical surfaces. Many swifts have long swept-back wings which resemble a crescent or boomerang.

Common and binomial names	Image	Status in Croatia	Regional IUCN status
Alpine swift (Apus melba)		Regular breeder in karst cliffs and coastal areas	LC – least concern (Croatia)
Common swift (Apus apus)		Abundant breeding summer visitor in towns and villages	LC – least concern (Croatia)
Pallid swift (Apus pallidus)		Scarce breeder and migrant along Adriatic coast	LC – least concern (Croatia)

== Rails, gallinules, and coots ==
Order: Gruiformes Family: Rallidae

Rallidae is a large family of small to medium-sized birds which includes the rails, crakes, coots and gallinules. Typically they inhabit dense vegetation in damp environments near lakes, swamps or rivers. In general they are shy and secretive birds, making them difficult to observe. Most species have strong legs and long toes which are well adapted to soft uneven surfaces. They tend to have short, rounded wings and to be weak fliers.

Common and binomial names	Image	Status in Croatia	Regional IUCN status
Water rail (Rallus aquaticus)		Widespread but secretive breeding resident	LC – least concern (Croatia)
Corn crake (Crex crex)		Localized breeding summer visitor in meadows	VU – vulnerable (Croatia)
Spotted crake (Porzana porzana)		Scarce breeding summer visitor	NT – near threatened (Croatia)
Eurasian moorhen (Gallinula chloropus)		Common breeding resident in wetlands	LC – least concern (Croatia)
Western swamphen (Porphyrio porphyrio)		(A) Accidental vagrant	LC – least concern (Croatia)
Eurasian coot (Fulica atra)		Abundant breeding resident	LC – least concern (Croatia)
Little crake (Zapornia parva)		Scarce breeding summer visitor	NT – near threatened (Croatia)
Baillon's crake (Zapornia pusilla)		Very rare breeding summer visitor	VU – vulnerable (Croatia)

== Cranes ==
Order: Gruiformes Family: Gruidae

Cranes are large, long-legged and long-necked birds. Unlike the similar-looking but unrelated herons, cranes fly with necks outstretched, not pulled back. Most have elaborate and noisy courting displays or "dances".

Common and binomial names	Image	Status in Croatia	Regional IUCN status
Common crane (Grus grus)		Regular migrant and winter visitor, occasional breeder	LC – least concern (Croatia)

== Thick-knees ==
Order: Charadriiformes Family: Burhinidae

The thick-knees are a group of largely tropical waders in the family Burhinidae. They are found worldwide within the tropical zone, with some species also breeding in temperate Europe and Australia. They are medium to large waders with strong black or yellow-black bills, large yellow eyes and cryptic plumage. Despite being classed as waders, most species have a preference for arid or semi-arid habitats.

Common and binomial names	Image	Status in Croatia	Regional IUCN status
Eurasian thick-knee (Burhinus oedicnemus)		Scarce breeder and migrant in dry open habitats	LC – least concern (Croatia)

== Stilts and avocets ==
Order: Charadriiformes Family: Recurvirostridae

Recurvirostridae is a family of large wading birds, which includes the avocets and stilts. The avocets have long legs and long up-curved bills. The stilts have extremely long legs and long, thin, straight bills.

Common and binomial names	Image	Status in Croatia	Regional IUCN status
Black-winged stilt (Himantopus himantopus)		Regular breeder in wetlands and saltpans	LC – least concern (Croatia)
Pied avocet (Recurvirostra avosetta)		Scarce migrant and occasional breeder	LC – least concern (Croatia)

== Oystercatchers ==
Order: Charadriiformes Family: Haematopodidae

The oystercatchers are large and noisy plover-like birds, with strong bills used for smashing or prising open molluscs.

Common and binomial names	Image	Status in Croatia	Regional IUCN status
Eurasian oystercatcher (Haematopus ostralegus)		Scarce migrant and occasional breeder along Adriatic coast	NT – near threatened (Croatia)

== Plovers and lapwings ==
Order: Charadriiformes Family: Charadriidae

The family Charadriidae includes the plovers, dotterels and lapwings. They are small to medium-sized birds with compact bodies, short, thick necks and long, usually pointed, wings. They are found in open country worldwide, mostly in habitats near water.

Common and binomial names	Image	Status in Croatia	Regional IUCN status
Black-bellied plover (Pluvialis squatarola)		Regular migrant and winter visitor along coasts	LC – least concern (Croatia)
European golden plover (Pluvialis apricaria)		Regular migrant and winter visitor	LC – least concern (Croatia)
American golden plover (Pluvialis dominica)		(A) Accidental vagrant, rare transatlantic visitor	LC – least concern (Croatia)
Northern lapwing (Vanellus vanellus)		Common breeder and migrant, declining population	NT – near threatened (Croatia)
Spur-winged lapwing (Vanellus spinosus)		(A) Accidental vagrant	LC – least concern (Croatia)
Red-wattled lapwing (Vanellus indicus)		(A) Accidental vagrant, Asian species	LC – least concern (Croatia)
Kentish plover (Charadrius alexandrinus)		Regular breeder along Adriatic coast	NT – near threatened (Croatia)
Common ringed plover (Charadrius hiaticula)		Regular migrant and winter visitor	LC – least concern (Croatia)
Little ringed plover (Charadrius dubius)		Common breeder in inland wetlands	LC – least concern (Croatia)
Eurasian dotterel (Charadrius morinellus)		(A) Accidental vagrant, rare migrant in mountains	LC – least concern (Croatia)

== Sandpipers and allies ==
Order: Charadriiformes Family: Scolopacidae

Scolopacidae is a large diverse family of small to medium-sized shorebirds including the sandpipers, curlews, godwits, shanks, tattlers, woodcocks, snipes, dowitchers and phalaropes. The majority of these species eat small invertebrates picked out of the mud or soil. Variation in length of legs and bills enables multiple species to feed in the same habitat, particularly on the coast, without direct competition for food.

Common and binomial names	Image	Status in Croatia	Regional IUCN status
Upland sandpiper (Bartramia longicauda)		(A) Accidental vagrant, North American species	LC – least concern (Croatia)
Whimbrel (Numenius phaeopus)		Regular migrant, scarce winter visitor	LC – least concern (Croatia)
Slender-billed curlew (Numenius tenuirostris)		(A) Accidental vagrant, formerly regular migrant, now globally extinct	EX – extinct (Croatia)
Eurasian curlew (Numenius arquata)		Regular migrant and winter visitor	NT – near threatened (Croatia)
Bar-tailed godwit (Limosa lapponica)		Scarce migrant	LC – least concern (Croatia)
Black-tailed godwit (Limosa limosa)		Regular migrant, declining	NT – near threatened (Croatia)
Ruddy turnstone (Arenaria interpres)		Scarce migrant	LC – least concern (Croatia)
Red knot (Calidris canutus)		Scarce migrant	NT – near threatened (Croatia)
Ruff (Calidris pugnax)		Common migrant	LC – least concern (Croatia)
Broad-billed sandpiper (Calidris falcinellus)		Scarce migrant	VU – vulnerable (Croatia)
Curlew sandpiper (Calidris ferruginea)		Regular migrant	NT – near threatened (Croatia)
Temminck's stint (Calidris temminckii)		Regular migrant	LC – least concern (Croatia)
Sanderling (Calidris alba)		Scarce migrant	LC – least concern (Croatia)
Dunlin (Calidris alpina)		Common migrant and winter visitor	LC – least concern (Croatia)
Purple sandpiper (Calidris maritima)		(A) Accidental vagrant	LC – least concern (Croatia)
Little stint (Calidris minuta)		Regular migrant	LC – least concern (Croatia)
Pectoral sandpiper (Calidris melanotos)		(A) Accidental vagrant, North American species	LC – least concern (Croatia)
Semipalmated sandpiper (Calidris pusilla)		(A) Accidental vagrant, North American species	LC – least concern (Croatia)
Jack snipe (Lymnocryptes minimus)		Regular winter visitor	LC – least concern (Croatia)
Eurasian woodcock (Scolopax rusticola)		Widespread breeding resident, also migrant	LC – least concern (Croatia)
Great snipe (Gallinago media)		Scarce migrant	NT – near threatened (Croatia)
Common snipe (Gallinago gallinago)		Common migrant and winter visitor	LC – least concern (Croatia)
Terek sandpiper (Xenus cinereus)		(A) Accidental vagrant	LC – least concern (Croatia)
Red-necked phalarope (Phalaropus lobatus)		(A) Accidental vagrant	LC – least concern (Croatia)
Red phalarope (Phalaropus fulicarius)		(A) Accidental vagrant	LC – least concern (Croatia)
Common sandpiper (Actitis hypoleucos)		Common migrant and breeding summer visitor	LC – least concern (Croatia)
Green sandpiper (Tringa ochropus)		Regular migrant and winter visitor	LC – least concern (Croatia)
Spotted redshank (Tringa erythropus)		Scarce migrant	LC – least concern (Croatia)
Common greenshank (Tringa nebularia)		Regular migrant	LC – least concern (Croatia)
Marsh sandpiper (Tringa stagnatilis)		Scarce migrant	LC – least concern (Croatia)
Wood sandpiper (Tringa glareola)		Common migrant	LC – least concern (Croatia)
Common redshank (Tringa totanus)		Regular migrant and scarce breeder	LC – least concern (Croatia)

== Pratincoles and coursers ==
Order: Charadriiformes Family: Glareolidae

Glareolidae is a family of wading birds comprising the pratincoles, which have short legs, long pointed wings and long forked tails, and the coursers, which have long legs, short wings and long, pointed bills which curve downwards.

Common and binomial names	Image	Status in Croatia	Regional IUCN status
Cream-colored courser (Cursorius cursor)		(A) Accidental vagrant, extremely rare visitor	LC – least concern (Croatia)
Collared pratincole (Glareola pratincola)		Scarce breeder and migrant in wetlands	NT – near threatened (Croatia)
Black-winged pratincole (Glareola nordmanni)		(A) Accidental vagrant, rare migrant	VU – vulnerable (Croatia)

== Skuas and jaegers ==
Order: Charadriiformes Family: Stercorariidae

The family Stercorariidae are, in general, medium to large birds, typically with grey or brown plumage, often with white markings on the wings. They nest on the ground in temperate and arctic regions and are long-distance migrants.

Common and binomial names	Image	Status in Croatia	Regional IUCN status
Great skua (Stercorarius skua)		(A) Accidental vagrant, very rare offshore records	LC – least concern (Croatia)
Pomarine jaeger (Stercorarius pomarinus)		(A) Accidental vagrant, rare offshore visitor	LC – least concern (Croatia)
Parasitic jaeger (Stercorarius parasiticus)		(A) Accidental vagrant, occasional records at sea	EN – endangered (Croatia)
Long-tailed jaeger (Stercorarius longicaudus)		(A) Accidental vagrant, very rare pelagic record	LC – least concern (Croatia)

== Auks, murres, and puffins ==
Order: Charadriiformes Family: Alcidae

Alcids are superficially similar to penguins due to their black-and-white colours, their upright posture and some of their habits, however they are not related to the penguins and differ in being able to fly. Auks live on the open sea, only deliberately coming ashore to nest.

Common and binomial names	Image	Status in Croatia	Regional IUCN status
Razorbill (Alca torda)		(A) Accidental vagrant in the Adriatic	LC – least concern (Croatia)
Black guillemot (Cepphus grylle)		(A) Accidental vagrant	LC – least concern (Croatia)
Atlantic puffin (Fratercula arctica)		(A) Accidental vagrant	LC – least concern (Croatia)

== Gulls, terns, and skimmers ==
Order: Charadriiformes Family: Laridae

Laridae is a family of medium to large seabirds, the gulls, terns, and skimmers. Gulls are typically grey or white, often with black markings on the head or wings. They have stout, longish bills and webbed feet. Terns are a group of generally medium to large seabirds typically with grey or white plumage, often with black markings on the head. Most terns hunt fish by diving but some pick insects off the surface of fresh water. Terns are generally long-lived birds, with several species known to live in excess of 30 years.

Common and binomial names	Image	Status in Croatia	Regional IUCN status
Black-legged kittiwake (Rissa tridactyla)		(A) Accidental vagrant	LC – least concern (Croatia)
Slender-billed gull (Chroicocephalus genei)		(A) Accidental vagrant	LC – least concern (Croatia)
Black-headed gull (Chroicocephalus ridibundus)		Common breeder and winter visitor	LC – least concern (Croatia)
Little gull (Hydrocoloeus minutus)		Regular migrant and winter visitor	LC – least concern (Croatia)
Franklin's gull (Leucophaeus pipixcan)		(A) Accidental vagrant, North American species	LC – least concern (Croatia)
Mediterranean gull (Ichthyaetus melanocephalus)		Regular breeder and migrant	LC – least concern (Croatia)
White-eyed gull (Ichthyaetus leucophthalmus)		(A) Accidental vagrant, Red Sea species	NT – near threatened (Croatia)
Pallas's gull (Ichthyaetus ichthyaetus)		(A) Accidental vagrant	LC – least concern (Croatia)
Audouin's gull (Ichthyaetus audouinii)		Scarce breeder in Adriatic colonies	NT – near threatened (Croatia)
Common gull (Larus canus)		Regular winter visitor	LC – least concern (Croatia)
Ring-billed gull (Larus delawarensis)		(A) Accidental vagrant, North American species	LC – least concern (Croatia)
European herring gull (Larus argentatus)		Regular winter visitor	LC – least concern (Croatia)
Yellow-legged gull (Larus michahellis)		Common breeder along Adriatic coast	LC – least concern (Croatia)
Caspian gull (Larus cachinnans)		Regular winter visitor	LC – least concern (Croatia)
Lesser black-backed gull (Larus fuscus)		Regular winter visitor	LC – least concern (Croatia)
Great black-backed gull (Larus marinus)		(A) Accidental vagrant	LC – least concern (Croatia)
Little tern (Sternula albifrons)		Scarce breeder in wetlands	LC – least concern (Croatia)
Gull-billed tern (Gelochelidon nilotica)		(A) Accidental vagrant	LC – least concern (Croatia)
Caspian tern (Hydroprogne caspia)		(A) Accidental vagrant	LC – least concern (Croatia)
Black tern (Chlidonias niger)		Regular migrant	LC – least concern (Croatia)
White-winged tern (Chlidonias leucopterus)		Regular migrant	LC – least concern (Croatia)
Whiskered tern (Chlidonias hybrida)		Regular breeder in wetlands	LC – least concern (Croatia)
Common tern (Sterna hirundo)		Common breeder and migrant	LC – least concern (Croatia)
Arctic tern (Sterna paradisaea)		(A) Accidental vagrant	LC – least concern (Croatia)
Sandwich tern (Thalasseus sandvicensis)		Regular migrant and winter visitor	LC – least concern (Croatia)

== Loons ==
Order: Gaviiformes Family: Gaviidae

Loons, known as divers in Europe, are a group of aquatic birds found in many parts of North America and northern Europe. They are the size of a large duck or small goose, which they somewhat resemble when swimming, but to which they are completely unrelated.

Common and binomial names	Image	Status in Croatia	Regional IUCN status
Red-throated loon (Gavia stellata)		Scarce winter visitor along the Adriatic coast	LC – least concern (Croatia)
Black-throated loon (Gavia arctica)		Rare winter visitor	LC – least concern (Croatia)
Common loon (Gavia immer)		(A) Accidental vagrant	LC – least concern (Croatia)
Yellow-billed loon (Gavia adamsii)		(A) Accidental vagrant	LC – least concern (Croatia)

== Northern storm-petrels ==
Order: Procellariiformes Family: Hydrobatidae

The northern storm-petrels are relatives of the petrels and are the smallest seabirds. They feed on planktonic crustaceans and small fish picked from the surface, typically while hovering. The flight is fluttering and sometimes bat-like.

Common and binomial names	Image	Status in Croatia	Regional IUCN status
European storm-petrel (Hydrobates pelagicus)		(A) Accidental vagrant in the Adriatic	LC – least concern (Croatia)

== Shearwaters and petrels ==
Order: Procellariiformes Family: Procellariidae

The procellariids are the main group of medium-sized "true petrels", characterised by united nostrils with medium septum and a long outer functional primary.

Common and binomial names	Image	Status in Croatia	Regional IUCN status
Northern fulmar (Fulmarus glacialis)		(A) Accidental vagrant in the Adriatic	LC – least concern (Croatia)
Cory's shearwater (Calonectris diomedea)		Scarce breeder on Adriatic islands	NT – near threatened (Croatia)
Yelkouan shearwater (Puffinus yelkouan)		Localized breeder in the Adriatic	VU – vulnerable (Croatia)

== Storks ==
Order: Ciconiiformes Family: Ciconiidae

Storks are large, long-legged, long-necked, wading birds with long, stout bills. Storks are mute, but bill-clattering is an important mode of communication at the nest. Their nests can be large and may be reused for many years. Many species are migratory.

Common and binomial names	Image	Status in Croatia	Regional IUCN status
Black stork (Ciconia nigra)		Regular migrant and breeding visitor in wetlands and forests	LC – least concern (Croatia)
White stork (Ciconia ciconia)		Common breeding summer visitor, especially in lowland villages	LC – least concern (Croatia)

== Boobies and gannets ==
Order: Suliformes Family: Sulidae

The sulids comprise the gannets and boobies. Both groups are medium to large coastal seabirds that plunge-dive for fish.

Common and binomial names	Image	Status in Croatia	Regional IUCN status
Northern gannet (Morus bassanus)		(A) Accidental vagrant in the Adriatic	LC – least concern (Croatia)

== Cormorants and shags ==
Order: Suliformes Family: Phalacrocoracidae

Phalacrocoracidae is a family of medium to large coastal, fish-eating seabirds that includes cormorants and shags. Plumage colouration varies, with the majority having mainly dark plumage, some species being black-and-white and a few being colourful.

Common and binomial names	Image	Status in Croatia	Regional IUCN status
Pygmy cormorant (Microcarbo pygmeus)		Scarce breeder in lowland wetlands and river valleys	VU – vulnerable (Croatia)
Great cormorant (Phalacrocorax carbo)		Common breeder and winter visitor along coast and inland waters	LC – least concern (Croatia)
European shag (Gulosus aristotelis)		Scarce coastal breeder and regular offshore visitor	LC – least concern (Croatia)

== Pelicans ==
Order: Pelecaniformes Family: Pelecanidae

Pelicans are large water birds with a distinctive pouch under their beak. As with other members of the order Pelecaniformes, they have webbed feet with four toes.

Common and binomial names	Image	Status in Croatia	Regional IUCN status
Great white pelican (Pelecanus onocrotalus)		(A) Accidental vagrant, rare visitor	LC – least concern (Croatia)
Dalmatian pelican (Pelecanus crispus)		(Ex) Former breeder, now locally extinct	RE – regionally extinct (Croatia)

== Herons, egrets, and bitterns ==
Order: Pelecaniformes Family: Ardeidae

The family Ardeidae contains the bitterns, herons and egrets. Herons and egrets are medium to large wading birds with long necks and legs. Bitterns tend to be shorter necked and more wary. Members of Ardeidae fly with their necks retracted, unlike other long-necked birds such as storks, ibises and spoonbills.

Common and binomial names	Image	Status in Croatia	Regional IUCN status
Great bittern (Botaurus stellaris)		Scarce breeder in reedbeds	NT – near threatened (Croatia)
Little bittern (Ixobrychus minutus)		Regular breeder in wetlands	LC – least concern (Croatia)
Gray heron (Ardea cinerea)		Common breeder and resident	LC – least concern (Croatia)
Purple heron (Ardea purpurea)		Regular breeder in wetlands	LC – least concern (Croatia)
Great egret (Ardea alba)		Increasing breeder and migrant	LC – least concern (Croatia)
Little egret (Egretta garzetta)		Regular breeder along Adriatic coast	LC – least concern (Croatia)
Western reef heron (Egretta gularis)		(A) Accidental vagrant, rare coastal record	LC – least concern (Croatia)
Cattle egret (Bubulcus ibis)		Scarce breeder and migrant, expanding range	LC – least concern (Croatia)
Squacco heron (Ardeola ralloides)		Regular breeder in wetlands	LC – least concern (Croatia)
Black-crowned night heron (Nycticorax nycticorax)		Regular breeder in wetlands	LC – least concern (Croatia)

== Ibises and spoonbills ==
Order: Pelecaniformes Family: Threskiornithidae

Threskiornithidae is a family of large terrestrial and wading birds which includes the ibises and spoonbills. They have long, broad wings with 11 primary and about 20 secondary feathers. They are strong fliers and despite their size and weight, very capable soarers.

Common and binomial names	Image	Status in Croatia	Regional IUCN status
Glossy ibis (Plegadis falcinellus)		Regular migrant and breeding visitor in wetlands	LC – least concern (Croatia)
African sacred ibis (Threskiornis aethiopicus)		(A) Accidental vagrant, introduced species elsewhere	LC – least concern (Croatia)
Northern bald ibis (Geronticus eremita)		(A) Accidental vagrant, globally endangered	CR – critically endangered (Croatia)
Eurasian spoonbill (Platalea leucorodia)		Regular migrant and breeding visitor in wetlands	LC – least concern (Croatia)

== Osprey ==
Order: Accipitriformes Family: Pandionidae

The family Pandionidae contains only one species, the osprey. The osprey is a medium-large raptor which is a specialist fish-eater with a worldwide distribution.

Common and binomial names	Image	Status in Croatia	Regional IUCN status
Osprey (Pandion haliaetus)		Scarce migrant and occasional winter visitor along coasts and rivers	LC – least concern (Croatia)

== Hawks, eagles, and kites ==
Order: Accipitriformes Family: Accipitridae

Accipitridae is a family of birds of prey, which includes hawks, eagles, kites, harriers and Old World vultures. These birds have powerful hooked beaks for tearing flesh from their prey, strong legs, powerful talons and keen eyesight.

Common and binomial names	Image	Status in Croatia	Regional IUCN status
Black-winged kite (Elanus caeruleus)		(A) Accidental vagrant	LC – least concern (Croatia)
Bearded vulture (Gypaetus barbatus)		(A) Accidental vagrant, formerly bred in Dinaric Alps	RE – regionally extinct (Croatia)
Egyptian vulture (Neophron percnopterus)		(Ex) Former breeder, now extinct in Croatia	RE – regionally extinct (Croatia)
European honey buzzard (Pernis apivorus)		Regular breeder and migrant	LC – least concern (Croatia)
Cinereous vulture (Aegypius monachus)		(A) Accidental vagrant	RE – regionally extinct (Croatia)
Eurasian griffon (Gyps fulvus)		Regular breeder on Adriatic cliffs	NT – near threatened (Croatia)
Short-toed snake eagle (Circaetus gallicus)		Scarce breeder	LC – least concern (Croatia)
Lesser spotted eagle (Clanga pomarina)		Scarce breeder in lowland forests	VU – vulnerable (Croatia)
Greater spotted eagle (Clanga clanga)		Rare migrant	EN – endangered (Croatia)
Booted eagle (Hieraaetus pennatus)		Scarce breeder	LC – least concern (Croatia)
Steppe eagle (Aquila nipalensis)		(A) Accidental vagrant	EN – endangered (Croatia)
Imperial eagle (Aquila heliaca)		Rare breeder, declining	EN – endangered (Croatia)
Golden eagle (Aquila chrysaetos)		Regular breeder in mountains	LC – least concern (Croatia)
Bonelli's eagle (Aquila fasciata)		Scarce breeder in rocky habitats	VU – vulnerable (Croatia)
Eurasian marsh harrier (Circus aeruginosus)		Regular breeder in wetlands	LC – least concern (Croatia)
Hen harrier (Circus cyaneus)		Regular winter visitor	LC – least concern (Croatia)
Pallid harrier (Circus macrourus)		Regular passage migrant and irregular wintering species	NT – near threatened (Croatia)
Montagu's harrier (Circus pygargus)		Scarce breeder in grasslands	VU – vulnerable (Croatia)
Levant sparrowhawk (Accipiter brevipes)		Regular migrant	LC – least concern (Croatia)
Eurasian sparrowhawk (Accipiter nisus)		Common breeder	LC – least concern (Croatia)
Eurasian goshawk (Accipiter gentilis)		Regular breeder in forests	LC – least concern (Croatia)
Red kite (Milvus milvus)		Scarce breeder, telemetry confirmed new nesting records in Croatia	NT – near threatened (Croatia)
Black kite (Milvus migrans)		Regular breeder and migrant	LC – least concern (Croatia)
White-tailed eagle (Haliaeetus albicilla)		Regular breeder in wetlands, stronghold in Kopački Rit	NT – near threatened (Croatia)
Rough-legged hawk (Buteo lagopus)		Rare winter visitor	LC – least concern (Croatia)
Common buzzard (Buteo buteo)		Very common breeder and resident	LC – least concern (Croatia)
Long-legged buzzard (Buteo rufinus)		(A) Accidental vagrant, rare records	LC – least concern (Croatia)

== Barn-owls ==
Order: Strigiformes Family: Tytonidae

Barn-owls are medium to large owls with large heads and characteristic heart-shaped faces. They have long strong legs with powerful talons.

Common and binomial names	Image	Status in Croatia	Regional IUCN status
Western barn owl (Tyto alba)		Regular breeder in rural areas, often near villages and farmland	LC – least concern (Croatia)

== Owls ==
Order: Strigiformes Family: Strigidae

The typical owls are small to large solitary nocturnal birds of prey. They have large forward-facing eyes and ears, a hawk-like beak and a conspicuous circle of feathers around each eye called a facial disk.

Common and binomial names	Image	Status in Croatia	Regional IUCN status
Eurasian scops owl (Otus scops)		Common breeder in woodlands and rural areas	LC – least concern (Croatia)
Eurasian eagle-owl (Bubo bubo)		Regular breeder in rocky habitats	LC – least concern (Croatia)
Eurasian pygmy owl (Glaucidium passerinum)		Scarce breeder in mountain forests	LC – least concern (Croatia)
Little owl (Athene noctua)		Common breeder in rural areas	LC – least concern (Croatia)
Tawny owl (Strix aluco)		Common breeder in forests	LC – least concern (Croatia)
Ural owl (Strix uralensis)		Scarce breeder in mountain forests	LC – least concern (Croatia)
Long-eared owl (Asio otus)		Common breeder in woodlands and farmland	LC – least concern (Croatia)
Short-eared owl (Asio flammeus)		Scarce breeder and migrant in open habitats	LC – least concern (Croatia)
Boreal owl (Aegolius funereus)		Scarce breeder in mountain conifer forests	LC – least concern (Croatia)

== Hoopoes ==
Order: Bucerotiformes Family: Upupidae

Hoopoes have black, white and orangey-pink colouring with a large erectile crest on their head.

Common and binomial names	Image	Status in Croatia	Regional IUCN status
Eurasian hoopoe (Upupa epops)		Common breeder in open countryside, orchards, and farmland	LC – least concern (Croatia)

== Kingfishers ==
Order: Coraciiformes Family: Alcedinidae

Kingfishers are medium-sized birds with large heads, long, pointed bills, short legs and stubby tails.

Common and binomial names	Image	Status in Croatia	Regional IUCN status
Common kingfisher (Alcedo atthis)		Regular breeder along rivers, lakes, and wetlands	LC – least concern (Croatia)

== Bee-eaters ==
Order: Coraciiformes Family: Meropidae

The bee-eaters are a group of coraciiform birds in the family Meropidae. Most species are found in Africa but others occur in southern Europe, Madagascar, Australia and New Guinea. They are characterised by richly coloured plumage, slender bodies and usually elongated central tail feathers. All are colourful and have long downturned bills and pointed wings, which give them a swallow-like appearance when seen from afar.

Common and binomial names	Image	Status in Croatia	Regional IUCN status
Blue-cheeked bee-eater (Merops persicus)		(A) Accidental vagrant	LC – least concern (Croatia)
European bee-eater (Merops apiaster)		Common breeding summer visitor	LC – least concern (Croatia)

== Rollers ==
Order: Coraciiformes Family: Coraciidae

Rollers resemble crows in size and build, but are more closely related to the kingfishers and bee-eaters. They share the colourful appearance of those groups with blues and browns predominating. The two inner front toes are connected, but the outer toe is not.

- European roller, Coracias garrulus

== Woodpeckers ==
Order: Piciformes Family: Picidae

Woodpeckers are small to medium-sized birds with chisel-like beaks, short legs, stiff tails and long tongues used for capturing insects. Some species have feet with two toes pointing forward and two backward, while several species have only three toes. Many woodpeckers have the habit of tapping noisily on tree trunks with their beaks.

- Eurasian wryneck, Jynx torquilla
- Eurasian three-toed woodpecker, Picoides tridactylus
- Middle spotted woodpecker, Dendrocoptes medius
- White-backed woodpecker, Dendrocopos leucotos
- Great spotted woodpecker, Dendrocopos major
- Syrian woodpecker, Dendrocopos syriacus
- Lesser spotted woodpecker, Dryobates minor
- Gray-headed woodpecker, Picus canus
- Eurasian green woodpecker, Picus viridis
- Black woodpecker, Dryocopus martius

== Falcons and caracaras ==
Order: Falconiformes Family: Falconidae

Falconidae is a family of diurnal birds of prey. They differ from hawks, eagles and kites in that they kill with their beaks instead of their talons.

Common and binomial names	Image	Status in Croatia	Regional IUCN status
Lesser kestrel (Falco naumanni)		Scarce breeder, declining population	VU – vulnerable (Croatia)
Eurasian kestrel (Falco tinnunculus)		Common breeding resident	LC – least concern (Croatia)
Red-footed falcon (Falco vespertinus)		Scarce breeder and migrant	NT – near threatened (Croatia)
Eleonora's falcon (Falco eleonorae)		Scarce breeder on Adriatic islands	NT – near threatened (Croatia)
Merlin (Falco columbarius)		Rare winter visitor	LC – least concern (Croatia)
Eurasian hobby (Falco subbuteo)		Regular breeder and migrant	LC – least concern (Croatia)
Lanner falcon (Falco biarmicus)		Scarce breeder in rocky habitats	NT – near threatened (Croatia)
Saker falcon (Falco cherrug)		Rare breeder and migrant, declining	EN – endangered (Croatia)
Peregrine falcon (Falco peregrinus)		Regular breeder in cliffs and mountains	LC – least concern (Croatia)

== Old World orioles ==
Order: Passeriformes Family: Oriolidae

The Old World orioles are colourful passerine birds. They are not related to the New World orioles.

- Eurasian golden oriole, Oriolus oriolus

== Shrikes ==
Order: Passeriformes Family: Laniidae

Shrikes are passerine birds known for their habit of catching other birds and small animals and impaling the uneaten portions of their bodies on thorns. A typical shrike's beak is hooked, like a bird of prey.

- Red-backed shrike, Lanius collurio
- Great gray shrike, Lanius excubitor
- Lesser gray shrike, Lanius minor
- Woodchat shrike, Lanius senator

== Crows, jays, and magpies ==
Order: Passeriformes Family: Corvidae

The family Corvidae includes crows, ravens, jays, choughs, magpies, treepies, nutcrackers and ground jays. Corvids are above average in size among the Passeriformes, and some of the larger species show high levels of intelligence.

Common and binomial names	Image	Status in Croatia	Regional IUCN status
Eurasian jay (Garrulus glandarius)		Common breeding resident in woodlands	LC – least concern (Croatia)
Eurasian magpie (Pica pica)		Abundant breeding resident in lowlands and towns	LC – least concern (Croatia)
Eurasian nutcracker (Nucifraga caryocatactes)		Localized breeding resident in coniferous forests	LC – least concern (Croatia)
Yellow-billed chough (Pyrrhocorax graculus)		Scarce localized breeder in alpine habitats	LC – least concern (Croatia)
Eurasian jackdaw (Corvus monedula)		Common breeding resident in towns and farmland	LC – least concern (Croatia)
Rook (bird) (Corvus frugilegus)		Fairly common breeding resident and winter visitor	LC – least concern (Croatia)
Carrion crow (Corvus corone)		Scarce breeder, mainly in NW Croatia	LC – least concern (Croatia)
Hooded crow (Corvus cornix)		Abundant breeding resident across Croatia	LC – least concern (Croatia)
Common raven (Corvus corax)		Widespread breeding resident in uplands and mountains	LC – least concern (Croatia)

== Tits, chickadees, and titmice ==
Order: Passeriformes Family: Paridae

The Paridae are mainly small stocky woodland species with short stout bills. Some have crests. They are adaptable birds, with a mixed diet including seeds and insects.

Common and binomial names	Image	Status in Croatia	Regional IUCN status
Coal tit (Periparus ater)		Common breeding resident in forests	LC – least concern (Croatia)
Crested tit (Lophophanes cristatus)		Regular breeding resident in coniferous forests	LC – least concern (Croatia)
Sombre tit (Poecile lugubris)		Scarce breeder in continental Croatia	NT – near threatened (Croatia)
Marsh tit (Poecile palustris)		Regular breeding resident in woodlands	LC – least concern (Croatia)
Willow tit (Poecile montana)		Scarce breeding resident in northern forests	NT – near threatened (Croatia)
Eurasian blue tit (Cyanistes caeruleus)		Common breeding resident	LC – least concern (Croatia)
Azure tit (Cyanistes cyanus)		(A) Accidental vagrant	LC – least concern (Croatia)
Great tit (Parus major)		Abundant breeding resident	LC – least concern (Croatia)

== Penduline-tits ==
Order: Passeriformes Family: Remizidae

The penduline-tits are a group of small passerine birds related to the true tits. They are insectivores.

- Eurasian penduline-tit, Remiz pendulinus

== Larks ==
Order: Passeriformes Family: Alaudidae

Larks are small terrestrial birds with often extravagant songs and display flights. Most larks are fairly dull in appearance. Their food is insects and seeds.

- Horned lark, Eremophila alpestris
- Greater short-toed lark, Calandrella brachydactyla
- Calandra lark, Melanocorypha calandra
- Wood lark, Lullula arborea
- Eurasian skylark, Alauda arvensis
- Crested lark, Galerida cristata

== Bearded reedling ==
Order: Passeriformes Family: Panuridae

This species, the only one in its family, is found in reed beds throughout temperate Europe and Asia.

- Bearded reedling, Panurus biarmicus

== Cisticolas and allies ==
Order: Passeriformes Family: Cisticolidae

The Cisticolidae are warblers found mainly in warmer southern regions of the Old World. They are generally very small birds of drab brown or grey appearance found in open country such as grassland or scrub.

- Zitting cisticola, Cisticola juncidis

== Reed warblers and allies ==
Order: Passeriformes Family: Acrocephalidae

The members of this family are usually rather large for "warblers". Most are rather plain olivaceous brown above with much yellow to beige below. They are usually found in open woodland, reedbeds, or tall grass. The family occurs mostly in southern to western Eurasia and surroundings, but it also ranges far into the Pacific, with some species in Africa.

- Booted warbler, Iduna caligata (A)
- Eastern olivaceous warbler, Iduna pallida
- Olive-tree warbler, Hippolais olivetorum
- Melodious warbler, Hippolais polyglotta
- Icterine warbler, Hippolais icterina
- Aquatic warbler, Acrocephalus paludicola (A)
- Moustached warbler, Acrocephalus melanopogon
- Sedge warbler, Acrocephalus schoenobaenus
- Paddyfield warbler, Acrocephalus agricola (A)
- Blyth's reed warbler, Acrocephalus dumetorum (A)
- Marsh warbler, Acrocephalus palustris
- Eurasian reed warbler, Acrocephalus scirpaceus
- Great reed warbler, Acrocephalus arundinaceus

== Grassbirds and allies ==
Order: Passeriformes Family: Locustellidae

Locustellidae are a family of small insectivorous songbirds found mainly in Eurasia, Africa, and the Australian region. They are smallish birds with tails that are usually long and pointed, and tend to be drab brownish or buffy all over.

- River warbler, Locustella fluviatilis
- Savi's warbler, Locustella luscinioides
- Common grasshopper-warbler, Locustella naevia

== Swallows ==
Order: Passeriformes Family: Hirundinidae

The family Hirundinidae is adapted to aerial feeding. They have a slender streamlined body, long pointed wings and a short bill with a wide gape. The feet are adapted to perching rather than walking, and the front toes are partially joined at the base.

Common and binomial names	Image	Status in Croatia	Regional IUCN status
Sand martin (Riparia riparia)		Common breeding summer visitor along rivers	LC – least concern (Croatia)
Eurasian crag-martin (Ptyonoprogne rupestris)		Localized breeding resident in cliffs and gorges	LC – least concern (Croatia)
Barn swallow (Hirundo rustica)		Abundant breeding summer visitor	LC – least concern (Croatia)
Red-rumped swallow (Cecropis daurica)		Scarce breeding summer visitor in southern Croatia	LC – least concern (Croatia)
Common house-martin (Delichon urbicum)		Common breeding summer visitor in towns and villages	LC – least concern (Croatia)

== Leaf warblers ==
Order: Passeriformes Family: Phylloscopidae

Leaf warblers are a family of small insectivorous birds found mostly in Eurasia and ranging into Wallacea and Africa. The species are of various sizes, often green-plumaged above and yellow below, or more subdued with greyish-green to greyish-brown colours.

- Wood warbler, Phylloscopus sibilatrix
- Western Bonelli's warbler, Phylloscopus bonelli
- Eastern Bonelli's warbler, Phylloscopus orientalis
- Yellow-browed warbler, Phylloscopus inornatus (A)
- Pallas's leaf warbler, Phylloscopus proregulus (A)
- Dusky warbler, Phylloscopus fuscatus (A)
- Willow warbler, Phylloscopus trochilus
- Common chiffchaff, Phylloscopus collybita

== Bush warblers and allies ==
Order: Passeriformes Family: Scotocercidae

The members of this family are found throughout Africa, Asia, and Polynesia. Their taxonomy is in flux, and some authorities place some genera in other families.

- Cetti's warbler, Cettia cetti

== Long-tailed tits ==
Order: Passeriformes Family: Aegithalidae

Long-tailed tits are a group of small passerine birds with medium to long tails. They make woven bag nests in trees. Most eat a mixed diet which includes insects.

- Long-tailed tit, Aegithalos caudatus

== Sylviid warblers, parrotbills, and allies ==
Order: Passeriformes Family: Sylviidae

The family Sylviidae is a group of small insectivorous passerine birds. They mainly occur as breeding species, as the common name implies, in Europe, Asia and, to a lesser extent, Africa. Most are of generally undistinguished appearance, but many have distinctive songs.

- Eurasian blackcap, Sylvia atricapilla
- Garden warbler, Sylvia borin
- Barred warbler, Curruca nisoria
- Lesser whitethroat, Curruca curruca
- Eastern Orphean warbler, Curruca crassirostris
- Eastern subalpine warbler, Curruca cantillans
- Sardinian warbler, Curruca melanocephala
- Greater whitethroat, Curruca communis
- Dartford warbler, Curruca undata (A)

== Kinglets ==
Order: Passeriformes Family: Regulidae

The kinglets, also called crests, are a small group of birds often included in the Old World warblers, but frequently given family status because they also resemble the titmice.

- Goldcrest, Regulus regulus
- Common firecrest, Regulus ignicapillus

== Wallcreeper ==
Order: Passeriformes Family: Tichodromidae

The wallcreeper is a small bird related to the nuthatch family, which has stunning crimson, grey and black plumage.

- Wallcreeper, Tichodroma muraria

== Nuthatches ==
Order: Passeriformes Family: Sittidae

Nuthatches are small woodland birds. They have the unusual ability to climb down trees head first, unlike other birds which can only go upwards. Nuthatches have big heads, short tails and powerful bills and feet.

- Eurasian nuthatch, Sitta europaea
- Western rock nuthatch, Sitta neumayer

== Treecreepers ==
Order: Passeriformes Family: Certhiidae

Treecreepers are small woodland birds, brown above and white below. They have thin pointed down-curved bills, which they use to extricate insects from bark. They have stiff tail feathers, like woodpeckers, which they use to support themselves on vertical trees.

- Eurasian treecreeper, Certhia familiaris
- Short-toed treecreeper, Certhia brachydactyla

== Wrens ==
Order: Passeriformes Family: Troglodytidae

The wrens are mainly small and inconspicuous except for their loud songs. These birds have short wings and thin down-turned bills. Several species often hold their tails upright. All are insectivorous.

- Eurasian wren, Troglodytes troglodytes

== Dippers ==
Order: Passeriformes Family: Cinclidae

Dippers are a group of perching birds whose habitat includes aquatic environments in the Americas, Europe and Asia. They are named for their bobbing or dipping movements.

- White-throated dipper, Cinclus cinclus

== Starlings ==
Order: Passeriformes Family: Sturnidae

Starlings are small to medium-sized passerine birds. Their flight is strong and direct and they are very gregarious. Their preferred habitat is fairly open country. They eat insects and fruit. Plumage is typically dark with a metallic sheen.

- European starling, Sturnus vulgaris
- Rosy starling, Pastor roseus

== Thrushes and allies ==
Order: Passeriformes Family: Turdidae

The thrushes are a group of passerine birds that occur mainly in the Old World. They are plump, soft plumaged, small to medium-sized insectivores or sometimes omnivores, often feeding on the ground. Many have attractive songs.

- Mistle thrush, Turdus viscivorus
- Song thrush, Turdus philomelos
- Redwing, Turdus iliacus
- Eurasian blackbird, Turdus merula
- Fieldfare, Turdus pilaris
- Ring ouzel, Turdus torquatus
- Dusky thrush, Turdus eunomus (A)

== Old World flycatchers ==
Order: Passeriformes Family: Muscicapidae

Old World flycatchers are a large group of small passerine birds native to the Old World. They are mainly small arboreal insectivores. The appearance of these birds is highly varied, but they mostly have weak songs and harsh calls.

- Spotted flycatcher, Muscicapa striata
- Rufous-tailed scrub-robin, Cercotrichas galactotes
- European robin, Erithacus rubecula
- Thrush nightingale, Luscinia luscinia
- Common nightingale, Luscinia megarhynchos
- Bluethroat, Luscinia svecica
- Red-breasted flycatcher, Ficedula parva
- Semicollared flycatcher, Ficedula semitorquata (A)
- European pied flycatcher, Ficedula hypoleuca
- Collared flycatcher, Ficedula albicollis
- Common redstart, Phoenicurus phoenicurus
- Black redstart, Phoenicurus ochruros
- Rufous-tailed rock-thrush, Monticola saxatilis
- Blue rock-thrush, Monticola solitarius
- Whinchat, Saxicola rubetra
- European stonechat, Saxicola rubicola
- Northern wheatear, Oenanthe oenanthe
- Pied wheatear, Oenanthe pleschanka (A)
- Western black-eared wheatear, Oenanthe hispanica
- Eastern black-eared wheatear, Oenanthe melanoleuca

== Waxwings ==
Order: Passeriformes Family: Bombycillidae

The waxwings are a group of passerine birds with soft silky plumage and unique red tips to some of the wing feathers. In the Bohemian and cedar waxwings, these tips look like sealing wax and give the group its name. These are arboreal birds of northern forests. They live on insects in summer and berries in winter.

- Bohemian waxwing, Bombycilla garrulus (A)

== Weavers and allies ==
Order: Passeriformes Family: Ploceidae

The weavers are small passerine birds related to the finches. They are seed-eating birds with rounded conical bills. The males of many species are brightly colored, usually in red or yellow and black, though some species show variation in color only in the breeding season.

Common and binomial names	Image	Status in Croatia	Regional IUCN status
Yellow-crowned bishop (Euplectes afer)		(A) Accidental vagrant, introduced records	LC – least concern (Croatia)

== Accentors ==
Order: Passeriformes Family: Prunellidae

The accentors are in the only bird family, Prunellidae, which is completely endemic to the Palearctic. They are small, fairly drab species superficially similar to sparrows.

- Alpine accentor, Prunella collaris
- Black-throated accentor, Prunella atrogularis (A)
- Dunnock, Prunella modularis

== Old World sparrows ==
Order: Passeriformes Family: Passeridae

Old World sparrows are small passerine birds. In general, sparrows tend to be small, plump, brown or grey birds with short tails and short powerful beaks. Sparrows are seed eaters, but they also consume small insects.

Common and binomial names	Image	Status in Croatia	Regional IUCN status
House sparrow (Passer domesticus)		Abundant breeding resident in towns and villages	LC – least concern (Croatia)
Italian sparrow (Passer italiae)		(A) Accidental vagrant	LC – least concern (Croatia)
Spanish sparrow (Passer hispaniolensis)		Localized breeder in Dalmatia	LC – least concern (Croatia)
Eurasian tree sparrow (Passer montanus)		Common breeding resident in farmland and villages	LC – least concern (Croatia)
Rock sparrow (Petronia petronia)		(A) Accidental vagrant	LC – least concern (Croatia)
White-winged snowfinch (Montifringilla nivalis)		(A) Accidental vagrant in alpine areas	LC – least concern (Croatia)

== Wagtails and pipits ==
Order: Passeriformes Family: Motacillidae

Motacillidae is a family of small passerine birds with medium to long tails. They include the wagtails, longclaws and pipits. They are slender, ground feeding insectivores of open country.

- Gray wagtail, Motacilla cinerea
- Western yellow wagtail, Motacilla flava
- Citrine wagtail, Motacilla citreola (A)
- White wagtail, Motacilla alba
- Richard's pipit, Anthus richardi (A)
- Tawny pipit, Anthus campestris
- Meadow pipit, Anthus pratensis
- Tree pipit, Anthus trivialis
- Red-throated pipit, Anthus cervinus
- Water pipit, Anthus spinoletta
- Rock pipit, Anthus petrosus

== Finches, euphonias, and allies ==
Order: Passeriformes Family: Fringillidae

Finches are seed-eating passerine birds, that are small to moderately large and have a strong beak, usually conical and in some species very large. All have twelve tail feathers and nine primaries. These birds have a bouncing flight with alternating bouts of flapping and gliding on closed wings, and most sing well.

- Common chaffinch, Fringilla coelebs
- Brambling, Fringilla montifringilla
- Hawfinch, Coccothraustes coccothraustes
- Common rosefinch, Carpodacus erythrinus (A)
- Eurasian bullfinch, Pyrrhula pyrrhula
- European greenfinch, Chloris chloris
- Twite, Linaria flavirostris (A)
- Eurasian linnet, Linaria cannabina
- Common redpoll, Acanthis flammea
- Hoary redpoll, Acanthis hornemanni (A)
- Parrot crossbill, Loxia pytyopsittacus (A)
- Red crossbill, Loxia curvirostra
- European goldfinch, Carduelis carduelis
- Citril finch, Carduelis citrinella (A)
- European serin, Serinus serinus
- Eurasian siskin, Spinus spinus

== Longspurs and snow buntings ==
Order: Passeriformes Family: Calcariidae

The Calcariidae are a group of passerine birds which had been traditionally grouped with the New World sparrows, but differ in a number of respects and are usually found in open grassy areas.

- Lapland longspur, Calcarius lapponicus (A)
- Snow bunting, Plectrophenax nivalis (A)

== Old World buntings ==
Order: Passeriformes Family: Emberizidae

The emberizids are a large family of passerine birds. They are seed-eating birds with distinctively shaped bills. Many emberizid species have distinctive head patterns.

- Black-headed bunting, Emberiza melanocephala
- Red-headed bunting, Emberiza bruniceps (A)
- Corn bunting, Emberiza calandra
- Rock bunting, Emberiza cia
- Cirl bunting, Emberiza cirlus
- Yellowhammer, Emberiza citrinella
- Pine bunting, Emberiza leucocephalos (A)
- Ortolan bunting, Emberiza hortulana
- Cretzschmar's bunting, Emberiza caesia
- Reed bunting, Emberiza schoeniclus
- Little bunting, Emberiza pusilla (A)
- Rustic bunting, Emberiza rustica (A)

== Cardinals and allies ==
Order: Passeriformes Family: Cardinalidae

The cardinals are a family of robust, seed-eating birds with strong bills. They are typically associated with open woodland. The sexes usually have distinct plumages.

Common and binomial names	Image	Status in Croatia	Regional IUCN status
Rose-breasted grosbeak (Pheucticus ludovicianus)		(A) Accidental vagrant, North American species recorded only rarely	LC – least concern (Croatia)

== See also ==
- List of birds
- Lists of birds by region
