= International rankings of Croatia =

The following are international rankings of Croatia.

== General ==
- United Nations: Human Development Index 2010, ranked Croatia as 51st out of 169 countries. In all, 194 countries were listed, but 25 were not ranked. Croatia is in the top third of nations labeled as having "high human development", which starts with the 43rd country. The top 42 nations in the index are labeled as having "very high human development". Human Development is quantified using such factors as longevity, education, and income. Human Development Index and its components

== Economic ==
- The Wall Street Journal and The Heritage Foundation: Index of Economic Freedom in 2011 ranked Croatia as having the 82nd freest economy among 179 countries in the world.

== Political ==
- Transparency International publishes an annual Corruption Perceptions Index. In 2010, Croatia ranked 62nd out of 178 countries. The CPI measures the degree to which public sector corruption is perceived to exist in 178 countries around the world. The 2010 results are drawn from 13 surveys and assessments published between January 2009 and September 2010.CPI 2010
- Reporters Without Borders publishes a Press Freedom Index. In 2010, Croatia tied for 62nd out of 178 countries, up from 78th in 2009.
- The 2014 Global Peace Index ranked Croatia 26th out of 162 countries.

== Other ==
Organization	Survey	Ranking
Reporters Without Borders	Worldwide Press Freedom Index 2009	62 out of 178
The Heritage Foundation/The Wall Street Journal	Index of Economic Freedom 2010^{[unfit]}	82 out of 179
Transparency International	Corruption Perceptions Index 2010	62 out of 180
United Nations Development Programme	Human Development Index 2009	45 out of 182
World Intellectual Property Organization	Global Innovation Index, 2026	46 out of 139
