= Human rights in Croatia =

Human rights in Croatia are defined by the Constitution of Croatia. Several human rights issues exist in the country, particularly around poverty, social welfare, and the prison system. Racial and sexual minorities face heightened discrimination.

There are numerous non-governmental organizations dealing with the issue in the country, as well as the Croatian Government's Office for Human Rights and several equality bodies, such as the Ombudsperson for Human Rights, Ombudsperson for Gender Equality, Children's Ombudsperson and the Disability Ombudsman. However, these institutions are underfunded, and their reports go ignored by the Croatian Parliament and Government.

== History ==
When Croatia was part of Yugoslavia, it largely inherited the federal constitutional framework on human rights. The rights of individuals were defined since the 1946 Constitution of Yugoslavia, but in comparatively much less detail and scope than in the 1963 Constitution. Yugoslavia did not accept all the principles on human rights and liberties promoted by the United Nations organizations, or all the relevant legal principles in continental Europe.

The 1966 International Covenant on Economic, Social and Cultural Rights was signed by Yugoslavia, and the concept of collective rights entered the discourse in Croatia as well, though not without controversy over the inability of courts to compel a state into affirmative duties.

As Yugoslavia fell apart in the early 1990s, Croatia underwent three historical events: the introduction of political pluralism, the independence of Croatia, and the Yugoslav Wars. The human rights issues, including their mass violations, were at the forefront of society and its relations to the world.

The modern Constitution of Croatia, first introduced in 1990, defines basic human rights in section three, and defines human rights protections in sections 14 through 69 since the amendments in 2001.

While human rights were nominally guaranteed, during the process of democratisation the new authorities immediately systematically discriminated large swaths of the population either because of their Serbian origin or because of associations with the Yugoslav People's Army, and consolidated power to the extent that it undermined the rule of law.

The Croatian delegation was present at the 1992 Earth Summit, and the concept of a third generation of human rights has been discussed with regard to environmental issues.

In 2008, the government created the first National programme for the protection and promotion of human rights (Croatian: Nacionalni program zaštite i promicanja ljudskih prava) which included several proposed measures to do so.

== Rights issues since independence ==
=== Freedom of speech ===
Reporters are often sued by politicians for defamation. In 2022, Croatia was named a country with one of the most lawsuits filed to silence journalists in the EU. There have also been cases of physical violence against reporters, such as when two reporters documenting an Easter Vigil were attacked by an unknown individual.

=== Reproductive rights ===
Abortion in Croatia is legal up to 10 weeks after conception, and has exceptions for women who have been pregnant for more than 10 weeks. Some conservative groups have advocated for a total ban. In one instance in 2022, a woman who passed the 10 week deadline was deprived of an abortion by four clinics, even though her fetus had a brain tumor, leading to protests.

=== Migrant rights ===
Croatia has been continuously criticized by human rights groups for refusing migrants. Many migrants seeking entry into Croatia are sent back to Bosnia and Herzegovina instead. Since 2020, Croatian police have been repeatedly criticized for using violence against migrants.

In 2021, the European Court of Human Rights ruled that Croatia violated the European Convention on Human Rights while sending a family from Afghanistan to Serbia. In the Russian invasion of Ukraine, 22,000 refugees were granted Temporary Protection Status by Croatia.

In December 2023, Croatia was found to have infringed upon the rights of an individual, when it forcibly expelled him from the country without justification. In it ruling in favour of the victim, the European Court of Human Rights ordered that Croatia provide compensation for the violation.

=== Discrimination against Roma ===
In addition to hate crimes and hate speech, the Roma people in Croatia face discrimination in housing, employment, and healthcare. A 2013 poll found that 44% of Croatians were prejudiced against the Roma people. According to the UN Human Rights Committee, there are estimated 30,000 to 40,000 Roma people in Croatia, accounting for 1% of the Croatian population, but their number is underreported. In the same report, the committee expresses concern around the number of reported racist attacks, and their improper handling by authorities. The life expectancy of Roma people in Croatia is significantly lower than that of the general population.

=== LGBTQ rights ===
Homosexuality was legalised in 1977. The age of consent was equalised in 1998. Gay people are not banned from military service. In 2003, the Croatian government passed laws prohibiting the distribution of homophobic materials, defamation of homosexuality and homosexual people, and discrimination based on sexual orientation in employment and education. Limited rights were conferred upon same-sex couples after three years of cohabitation in 2003, but registered unions were not permitted until 2014. Since then, Croatia has granted all marital rights to registered and non-registered same-sex partnerships, with the exception of joint adoption.

In November 2010, the European Commission's annual progress report on Croatia's candidacy expressed concern around Croatia's numerous homophobic incidents, adding that the government should increase its efforts to combat hate crimes. Same-sex marriage was banned by a constitutional referendum in 2013.

== Historical ratings ==
The following chart shows Croatia's ratings since 1991 in the Freedom in the World reports, published annually by Freedom House. A rating of 1 is "free"; 7, "not free".^{1}

Historical ratings

Year	Political Rights	Civil Liberties	Status	President^{2}
1991	3	4	Partly Free	Franjo Tuđman
1992	4	4	Partly Free	Franjo Tuđman
1993	4	4	Partly Free	Franjo Tuđman
1994	4	4	Partly Free	Franjo Tuđman
1995	4	4	Partly Free	Franjo Tuđman
1996	4	4	Partly Free	Franjo Tuđman
1997	4	4	Partly Free	Franjo Tuđman
1998	4	4	Partly Free	Franjo Tuđman
1999	4	4	Partly Free	Franjo Tuđman
2000	2	3	Free	Franjo Tuđman
2001	2	2	Free	Stjepan Mesić
2002	2	2	Free	Stjepan Mesić
2003	2	2	Free	Stjepan Mesić
2004	2	2	Free	Stjepan Mesić
2005	2	2	Free	Stjepan Mesić
2006	2	2	Free	Stjepan Mesić
2007	2	2	Free	Stjepan Mesić
2008	2	2	Free	Stjepan Mesić
2009	1	2	Free	Stjepan Mesić
2010	1	2	Free	Stjepan Mesić
2011	1	2	Free	Ivo Josipović
2012	1	2	Free	Ivo Josipović
2013	1	2	Free	Ivo Josipović
2014	1	2	Free	Ivo Josipović
2015	1	2	Free	Ivo Josipović
2016	1	2	Free	Kolinda Grabar-Kitarović
2017	1	2	Free	Kolinda Grabar-Kitarović
2018	1	2	Free	Kolinda Grabar-Kitarović
2019	1	2	Free	Kolinda Grabar-Kitarović
2020	1	2	Free	Kolinda Grabar-Kitarović
2021	1	2	Free	Zoran Milanović
2022	2	2	Free	Zoran Milanović
2023	2	2	Free	Zoran Milanović

== See also ==
- Human trafficking in Croatia
- Internet censorship and surveillance in Croatia
- Political prisoners in Yugoslavia
- Croatia in the European Union

== Notes ==
1.Note that the "Year" signifies the "Year covered". Therefore the information for the year marked 2008 is from the report published in 2009, and so on.
2.As of January 1.
