= Prostitution in Croatia =

Prostitution in Croatia is illegal but common. Forcible prostitution, any kind of brothels, or procuring are treated as a felony, while voluntary prostitution is considered to be infraction against public order (for prostitutes only; clients are not in violation of law). Like in many other Southeast European countries, the problem of human trafficking for the purposes of sex is big in Croatia.

Many women from Bosnia and Herzegovina and Eastern Europe, especially from Ukraine, work as prostitutes in Croatia. Some prostitutes commute to the island of Hvar, which is a popular tourist destination.

== History ==
At the turn of the 20th century, prostitution was legal. In Zagreb it was advertised as a tourist attraction and contributed to the city's economy. Tkalčićeva Street was the main centre for brothels. At one stage every other building was a bordello. To open a brothel, the owner had to register at the town hall and received a licence. The licence required the brothel to be well run and provide a quality service. The women working in the brothels had to have a twice weekly medical examination. Brothels were not allowed to advertise their presence, but a discrete, uncommonly coloured lantern was allowed to be placed outside.

The best known brothels in Zagreb were the Kod Zelene Lampe (Green Lantern's), which was the most expensive, the Pick, and the Klub which had cabaret until 5 a.m. The Bijela Lađa ("White Vessel") was known for its mandolin music and fine wine. The Zagreb brothels continued to operate until World War II.

Following the creation of Yugoslavia after WWII, prostitution was made illegal.

In the 1970s, Zagreb became known as the centre of prostitution in Yugoslavia, with the highest number of prostitutes. Women from other areas of Yugoslavia, such as Sarajevo, came to the city because of the higher rates for prostitutes compared to their own areas.

The economic crisis, post-communist turmoil and subsequent arrival of international military personnel, demand for prostitution rose. The opening of borders allowed foreign prostitutes to come to the country.

== Legal situation ==
Two acts of law criminalise prostitution and related activities. the "Act on the Misdemeanours against Public Peace and Order" criminalises the selling of sex and some third-party involvement. The Criminal Code also makes third-party involvement illegal.

=== Act on the Misdemeanours against Public Peace and Order ===
This act was added to Croatian legislation in the year 2000. Article 7 forbids using premises for prostitution and enabling or helping another person to engage in prostitution. The punishment is a fine or up to 60 days' imprisonment. Article 12 forbids 'falling into' prostitution. This is interpreted as repeatedly selling sex. The punishment is a fine or up to 30 days' imprisonment. Additionally, offenders may be made to undergo STI and HIV testing and treatment if infected. They can also be expelled from the area the offence took place in for a period of 30 days to 6 months.

=== Criminal Code ===
Since the 1997 Croatian criminal law reform, certain activities related to prostitution were included in the Criminal Code. Trafficking in human beings was added to the code in 2003.

Within the code, Article 175, "Offences against Sexual Freedom", criminalises organising, inciting a person to, or abetting prostitution. The punishment is 6 months' to 5 years' imprisonment, or 1 to 10 years if there is any compulsion (force, threat, deceit, abuse of power) involved. Article 162, "Section of Offences of Sexual Abuse of Children", increases punishment to 1 to 10 years' imprisonment if children are involved, or to 3 to 15 years if there is also any compulsion.

=== Clients ===
Apart from Article 175 of the Criminal Code criminalising purchasing sexual services from underage, coerced or trafficked prostitutes, clients commit no offence.

In 2012, the Ministry of the Interior proposed criminalising clients but this was never presented to the Croatian Parliament. The Ministry also made similar proposals in May 2016.

== Sex trafficking ==
Croatia is a destination, source, and transit country for women and children subjected to sex trafficking. Migrants in transit, particularly from Afghanistan and Pakistan, are forced into debt bondage by their smugglers to pay off smuggling fees. Croatian women and girls, some of whom respond to false job offers online, are exploited in sex trafficking within the country and elsewhere in Europe. In previous years, traffickers target Croatian girls in state institutions and subjected them to sex trafficking. Women and girls from the Balkans and Central Europe are subjected to sex trafficking in Croatia.

Articles 105 and 106 of the criminal code criminalise all forms of trafficking and prescribe penalties of one to 15 years' imprisonment. The government investigated seven trafficking cases, the same number investigated in 2015, involving 11 alleged perpetrators. The government prosecuted 11 defendants (five for child sex trafficking, two for sex trafficking, and four for forced labour), compared to four defendants in 2015. Courts convicted seven traffickers (eight in 2015), five of which were appealable verdicts and two were final verdicts with sentences of six years' imprisonment for a sex trafficking case.

Police identified 17 sex trafficking victims in 2016, compared to 38 sex trafficking victims in 2015. The Ministry of Demography, Family, Youth and Social Policy (MDFYSP) spent approximately 400,000 kunas (US$56,740) to support two shelters and provide monthly stipends for victims, compared to 446,541 kunas (US$63,340) in 2015. The government provided shelter for one child, two females, and one male.

The United States Department of State Office to Monitor and Combat Trafficking in Persons ranks Croatia as a 'Tier 2' country.
