= Globus (weekly) =

Croatian news magazine

- Cover of the 23 December 2011 issue
- Editor: Zdravko Milinović
- Categories: News magazine
- Frequency: Biweekly
- Circulation: 28,000 (2009)
- Publisher: 4 Media EPH D.O.O.
- First issue: 13 December 1990
- Company: Hanza Media
- Country: Croatia
- Language: Croatian
- Website: globus.jutarnji.hr
- ISSN: 0353-9903

Globus is a Croatian language weekly news magazine published in Zagreb, Croatia.

== History and profile ==
Globus was started in 1990, having some of its first issues published during the Croatian War of Independence. The founders are Ninoslav Pavic, Denis Kuljiš and Zdravko Jurak. The magazine is based in Zagreb. It is owned by Europapress holding (EPH) media group, one of the largest media publishing companies in the country. Globus is one of EPH's flagship publication along with Jutarnji list daily. The magazine is published by 4 Media EPH d.o.o. on a weekly basis.

Originally devised as tabloid, it never took an openly chauvinist approach of Slobodni tjednik and always tried to give the appearance of objectivity. Gradually, its articles began to deal with shady aspects of privatisation, abuses against ethnic Serb citizens and other topics not covered by mainstream media in Croatia. As such Globus is credited for introducing investigative journalism in Croatia. The magazine covers articles on corruption, fraud, abuse of power and political assassinations.

In 2009 the circulation of Globus was 28,000 copies.
