= Nedjeljni Jutarnji =

- Type: Weekly newspaper
- Format: Berliner
- Owner(s): Europapress Holding
- Publisher: Europapress Holding
- Founded: March 2003
- Language: Croatian
- Headquarters: Koranska 2, Zagreb, Croatia
- ISSN: 1331-5692
- Website: www.nedjeljni.hr

Nedjeljni Jutarnji is the weekly Sunday edition of Jutarnji list, one of the two prominent dailies in Croatia. Nedjeljni is principally concerned with life, culture, politics and style. Founded by Tomislav Wruss in 2003 in the long tradition of Croatian Sunday papers such as Nedjeljna Dalmacija, it was brasher and less polite than the daily edition of Jutarnji.

Nedjeljni typically publishes fewer political and more urban-tabloid and human interest stories than its daily counterpart. The approach is more populist and entertaining, yet it has also been a platform for serious debate and important crusading issues.

== Recent development ==
Nedjeljni has undergone a visual re-design since June 2010. The number of pages has been expanded to about 90, in order to match the volume of Sunday papers in Britain or the U.S. Numerous columnists have been added, and now include the literary critic and essayist Igor Mandić, leading web entrepreneur Nenad Bakic, actress and screenwriter Jelena Veljača, editor-in-chief of Forbes Croatia, Viktor Vresnik and culinary expert Rene Bakalović.

Nedjeljni also launched a weekly food supplement, Dobra Hrana, with 10 pages of cooking tips and features on dining culture. The paid circulation figures have been increasing in recent months, and the title currently outsells the daily edition of Jutarnji.

== Notable stories ==
In September 2010, Nedjeljni launched a series of investigative features on the Croatian meat industry, exposing the systematic failure of inspections and border controls. The series drew sharp criticism from government officials and industry leaders, but Jutarnji continued publishing until the government opened a hotline and launched a series of investigation.

In October 2010, the paper published a shocking feature on the Croatian shadow economy, which by some estimates represents about 30% of the country's GDP. The feature was widely cited and brought about a change in the legal system in order to battle shadow economy.

On its March 2, 2011 cover, the paper published an exclusive story on the corruption in the European parliament involving the Slovenian, Romanian and Austrian representatives.

Also, on January 3, 2010, Nedjeljni published one of the first articles on Fimi-media, a company that was allegedly involved in a corruption scandal that led to the arrest of former Croatian Prime Minister Ivo Sanader.
