= Igor Mandić =

Croatian writer (1939–2022)

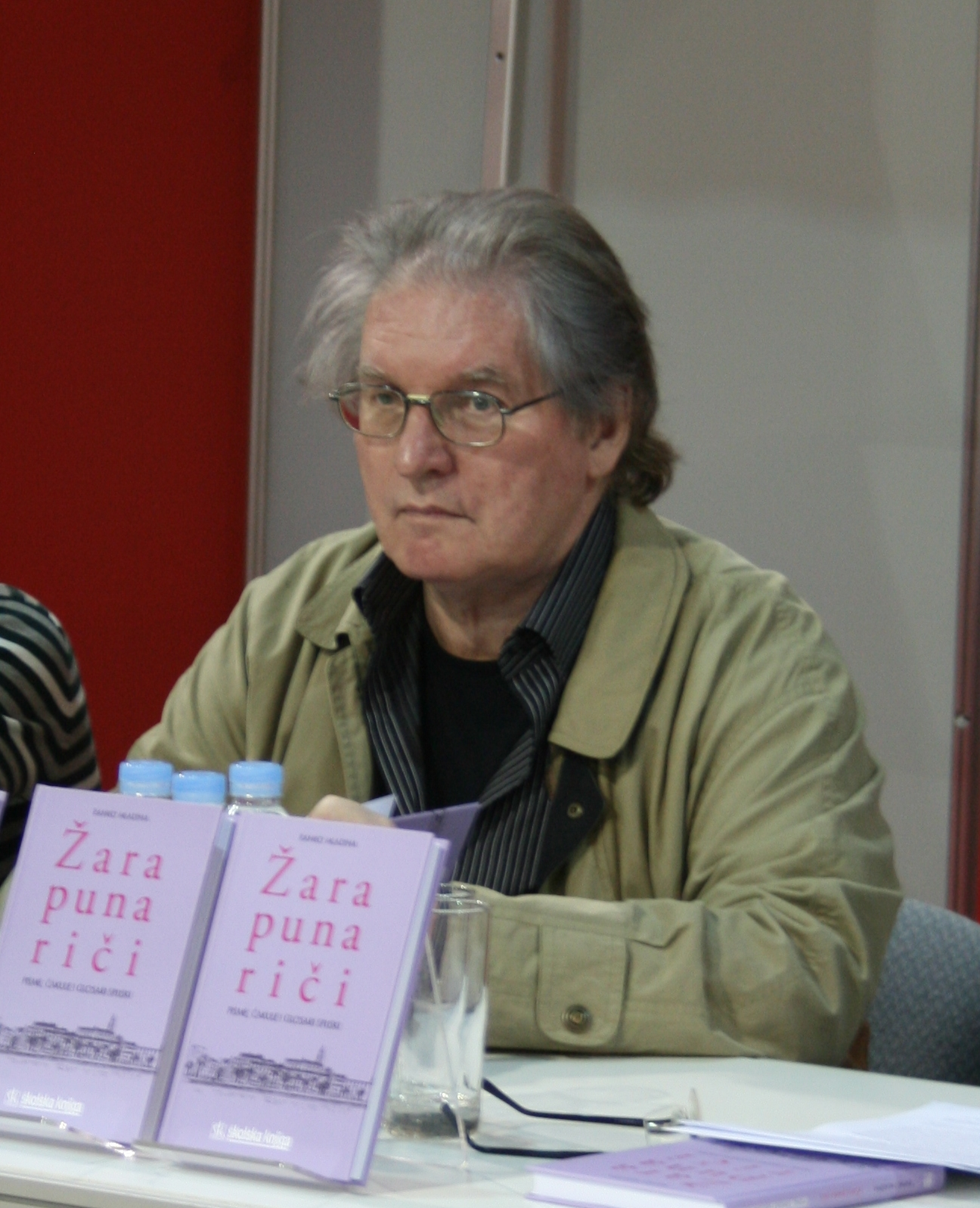
- Mandić at the 2008 Interliber book fair in Zagreb
- Born: 20 November 1939; Šibenik, Banovina of Croatia, Kingdom of Yugoslavia
- Died: 13 March 2022 (aged 82); Zagreb, Croatia
- Education: University of Zagreb
- Occupations: Journalist; freelance writer
- Writing career
- Language: Croatian
- Period: 1959–2022
- Subjects: Literature; music; mass media; feminism; gastronomy; sexuality; erotica

Igor Mandić (20 November 1939 – 13 March 2022) was a Croatian writer, literary critic, columnist and essayist. According to Croatian historian Slobodan Prosperov Novak, Mandić was the most important and the most versatile Croatian newspaper writer of the second half of the 20th century. His polemic texts have marked a Yugoslav publicist epoch of the 1960s and 1970s. Known for his fresh, sharp writing style and contrarian views, he has been dubbed "the master of quarrel".

== Biography ==
=== Early life ===
Igor Mandić was born in Šibenik on 20 November 1939. Both of his parents were of mixed Croatian and Italian ancestry, from the region of Istria. His paternal grandfather was born in Kastavštine, but due to work moved to the Šibenik region at the end of the 19th century to become one of the areas first electrician's. Igor Mandić's father Emilio, whom Mandić described as a self-made man", was born in the small town of Konjevrate next to Šibenik. He owned a book store that had an important role in intellectual life of the Šibenik area. His mother Adele Sirola was born in Pula to an ethnic-Italian father and an Italian-speaking Slavic mother. The Mandić and Sirola families were highly influential in Istria. During the Italian occupation of Dalmatia in World War II, Mandić's father did business with the Italians, all the while secretly helping the Partisan resistance by supplying them with typewriters, a precious commodity during wartime. Nevertheless, the communist authorities nationalized his shop in 1948, leaving the family without its only source of income.

Mandić finished elementary school in Split, where his family had moved after they lost the book store. After graduating from the classical gymnasium in Split in 1958, Mandić studied comparative literature at the Faculty of Humanities and Social Sciences, University of Zagreb, graduating in 1963. During his university years Mandić began to write literary and music reviews, publishing them in student newspapers, literary magazines and cultural weeklies.

=== Work at Vjesnik ===
In 1965, after completing his compulsory military service, Mandić settled permanently in Zagreb, working as a part-time literary critic for the Croatian daily Vjesnik. A year later, Mandić got a full-time job in Vjesnik as a literary and music critic, and also a columnist in Vjesnik u srijedu, a popular weekly magazine published by the same company.

Mandić's articles and columns quickly attracted attention. Particularly controversial was his music criticism; among others, his statement that Tchaikovsky's works "belong[ed] in a museum" drew an array of irate letters to the editor coming from individuals and organizations alike. The editorial board was in a dilemma, as they wanted to keep Mandić, yet also to maintain good relations with the music establishment. To resolve the problem, Vjesnik's director Božidar Novak asked Miroslav Krleža, a leading Croatian and Yugoslav writer and intellectual of the era, what he thought about Igor Mandić's writings. Krleža replied that, while he didn't agree with everything Mandić wrote, the society needed more critics such as him. This proved to be crucial in saving Mandić's job in Vjesnik. Mandić himself was not aware of the full extent of opposition to his views, and only learned about Krleža's intervention many years later. A similar controversy erupted in 1974, when Mandić described Tchaikovsky's works as "the kitschiest opus in the history of music".

=== The "Mandić Affair" ===
In 1977, Mandić published a collection of his literary reviews, containing an October 1971 review of We Are All Guilty, a book by Croatian writer Petar Šegedin who was subsequently purged for his "extreme nationalism". Following the publication, Mandić was criticized in a July 1977 speech by Dušan Dragosavac, Secretary of the Executive Committee of the League of Communists of Croatia, who found that this review did not sufficiently distance itself from Šegedin's theses, and accused Mandić of "nationalistic deviation". Mandić felt this criticism was unfair and responded with an unprecedented open letter to Dragosavac, published in Oko magazine, in which he stood by his text, arguing that "one cannot falsify the history of literature by omitting parts which in no way have been ideologically condemned". Dragosavac replied with an open letter of his own, maintaining that Mandić's review was unacceptable because of its "ideological-political aspects", but assured him that his status as an author should not be endangered.

The attack on Mandić was continued by Komunist, the official publication of the League of Communists of Yugoslavia, which — in an article titled "Misuse of our Democracy" — accused Mandić of "nationalism in action", and also criticized Oko and Vjesnik for publishing the two open letters without comment, that is, without saying who was right and who was wrong. Mandić responded with a letter in which he rejected the "nationalist" label, citing several of his Croatian Spring-era articles in which he was critical of nationalistic excesses. Finally, Mandić was attacked in an article published in Vjesnik itself, which also warned against "bourgeois ideology, and the traditionally anticommunist and separatist base of Croatian nationalism".

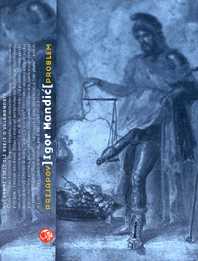
Prijapov problem ("Priapus' Problem", 1999), subtitled "vulgar essays or essays on vulgarity", is a collection of Mandić's essays originally published in Erotika between 1985 and 1992.

In the aftermath of the affair, Mandić was barred from publishing in Croatian newspapers and magazines for more than a decade. He kept his employment, but was reassigned to Erotika, Vjesnik's softcore magazine, and, while he was still able to publish his books, they went without a single review in the media. In this period he collaborated with some Belgrade-based magazines such as NIN and Duga.

=== 1990s and 2000s ===
From 1993 to 1995, Mandić wrote cultural commentaries for Slobodna Dalmacija, and since 1997 he worked as a freelance writer, publishing in various periodicals such as Novi Plamen.

Mandić was the editor-in-chief of Vjesnik from February to October 2000. He succeeded in introducing good-quality content and democratizing the government-controlled newspaper after a decade of Croatian Democratic Union rule, but was dismissed by the Supervisory Board for failing to boost circulation and make the paper profitable.

Mandić was interviewed in Boris Malagurski's documentary film The Weight of Chains 2 (2014). In the later years he was writing a popular weekly column for Nedjeljni Jutarnji, Ćorava kutija.

=== Personal life ===
Mandić died on 13 March 2022 in Zagreb, at the age of 82.

== Awards ==
In 1999, he received Matica hrvatska's award A. G. Matoš for his book Književno (st)ratište. In 2005, he received a life achievement award of the Croatian Journalists' Association. In 2006, at the book fair Sa(n)jam knjigu u Puli he received the Kiklop Award for his book Sebi pod kožu. In 2008, he received the Joško Kulušić Lifetime Achievement Award from Slobodna Dalmacija daily newspaper.

== Works ==
Mandić was a prolific writer. He published literary critiques, socio-culturological feuilletons and essays. He was a lifetime collaborator of various radio and television stations.

He published following books:

- Uz dlaku (critics, Mladost, Zagreb 1970)
- Mysterium televisionis (essays, Mogućnosti, Split 1972)
- Gola masa (feuilletons, Znanje, Zagreb 1973)
- Nježno srce (polemics, Znanje, Zagreb 1975)
- Mitologija svakidašnjeg života (feuilletons, Otokar Keršovani, Rijeka 1976)
- Od Bacha do Cagea (essays and critics, Mladost, Zagreb 1977)
- 101 kratka kritika (Zagreb 1977)
- U sjeni ocvale glazbe (polemics, Znanje, Zagreb 1977)
- Policajci duha (polemics, Globus, Zagreb 1979)
- Šok sadašnjosti (essays, Centar za informacije i publicitet, Zagreb 1979)
- Arsen (monography, Zagreb, 1983)
- Književnost i medijska kultura (essays, Nakladni zavod Matice hrvatske, Zagreb 1984)
- Što, zapravo, hoće te žene (feuilletons, Znanje, Zagreb 1984; Varaždin and Pula 1985)
- Principi krimića (essays, Mladost, Beograd 1985)
- Jedna antologija hrvatske poratne poezije (anthology, Prokuplje, Zagreb, 1987)
- Zbogom dragi Krleža (polemics, Književne novine, Beograd 1988; 2nd ed. Profil international, Zagreb 2007)
- Bračna kuhinja (co-authored with Slavica Mandić; feuilletons, Grafički zavod Hrvatske, Zagreb 1989; 2nd ed. Profil international, Zagreb 2006)
- Ekstaze i mamurluci (essays, August Cesarec, Zagreb 1989)
- Romani i krize (critics, Beograd, 1996)
- Književno (st)ratište (critics, Nakladni zavod Matice hrvatske, Zagreb 1998)
- Za našu stvar (critics and polemics, Konzor, Zagreb 1999; 2nd expanded ed. Biblioteka XX. vek, Beograd 2001)
- Prijapov problem (essays, Arkzin, Zagreb 1999)
- Između dv(ij)e vatre (columns, Nin, Beograd 2000)
- Bijela vrana (columns and polemics, Prosvjeta, Zagreb 2000)
- Hitna služba (a selection of columns from Vjesnik 1999-2005, Sysprint, Zagreb 2005)
- Sebi pod kožu. Nehotična autobiografija (Profil international, Zagreb 2006)
- Notes (columns, Matica hrvatska, Zagreb 2007)
- U zadnji čas (Profil International, Zagreb 2009)
