= Jelena Veljača =

Croatian actress and screenwriter (born 1981)

- Born: 23 April 1981 (age 45); Zagreb, SR Croatia, SFR Yugoslavia
- Occupation: Actress
- Years active: 2004–present

Jelena Veljača (born 23 April 1981) is a Croatian actress and screenwriter, currently writing a weekly column for Nedjeljni Jutarnji.

Veljača was born in Zagreb. She is best known for her role as Maja Župan in the Croatian telenovela Ljubav u zaleđu (Love in an Offside Position). She also appeared in the first Croatian telenovela ever, Villa Maria. Additionally, she co-wrote the script for the telenovelas Obični ljudi (Ordinary People) and Ponos Ratkajevih (Pride of the Ratkaj Family). She also appeared in the Croatian political thriller series Urota (Conspiracy). In 2006, it was announced that she would be one of the writers on the upcoming Croatian edition of Survivor.

Her 2009 book, Mama vam je cijelo vrijeme lagala (Mum Lied to You Entire Time), is a collection of weekly newspaper columns written for Jutarnji list.

Veljača is a co-founder of #spasime, a social movement against domestic violence, started in 2019.
