= Sisak killings =

Mass killing in Croatia

- Location: Sisak, Croatia
- Date: July 1991–June 1992
- Target: Serb civilians
- Attack type: Mass killing
- Deaths: 100+
- Perpetrators: Croatian Army (HV) and police Special Police Unit "Vukovi"

The Sisak killings refers to the illegal detainment, torture and murder of Croatian Serb civilians from the city of Sisak by members of the Croatian Army and police from July 1991 to June 1992 during the Croatian War of Independence. Most of the crimes are linked to the Sisak Special Police Unit "Vukovi". In 2013, Vladimir Milanković, wartime deputy police commander of the Sisak area, was convicted of ordering illegal arrests and not punishing crimes against Serb civilians and sentenced to ten years in prison.

== Background ==
In the 1990 parliamentary and local elections, the reformed communist party SKH-SDP won in Sisak. Out of eight parliamentary mandates, in three councils of the Parliament, it won five seats, the Croatian Democratic Union (HDZ) won one and the rest was won by candidates from the Association of Independent Businessmen Đurđevac and the Socialist Alliance – the Alliance of Socialists of Croatia. Locally, out of 144 councilor seats, the SKH-SDP won 73 seats. Many local Serbs supported the SKH-SDP rather than the Serbian Democratic Party (SDS) because they viewed it as a protector of Serbian interests and associated it with the anti-fascist legacy of World War II. Although SDS won only a handful of seats in the Croatian parliament, the party increasingly positioned itself as the representative of Croatia’s Serbs and demanded political autonomy should Croatia secede from Yugoslavia.

Following the Log Revolution in August 1990, the situation deteriorated. In late September, rioting broke out in the region of Banija after Minister of the Interior Josip Boljkovac ordered the seizure of weapons from the public security stations in order to equip the newly recruited contingent of police officers. On 18-21 December 1990, a referendum was held in 22 local communities and 32 settlements with a majority Serb population. The SDS announced that more than 80 percent of the population voted for secession from Sisak. In March 1991, the Republic of Serb Krajina (RSK) declared its intention to secede from Croatia and join the Republic of Serbia while the Government of the Republic of Croatia declared it a rebellion.

In May 1991, a referendum was held in which over 99% of voters supported SAO Krajina unifying with the Republic of Serbia. In June 1991 Croatia declared independence from Yugoslavia. Tensions eventually broke out into full-scale war, which lasted until 1995.

According to the 1991 Croatian census, the city of Sisak had a population of 84,348 of which 54,621 were Croats and 19,209 were Serbs. Serbs accounted for approximately 24% of the population. Sisak is situated in central Croatia, approximately 50 kilometres southeast of Zagreb. As war began, the town was on the front lines.

== Crimes and killings ==
Between 1991 and 1992, Croatian Serbs living in Sisak and surrounding areas were subjected to threats, abductions, killings and "disappearances". Many of the victims were ordinary civilians—retirees, workers, drivers, and shopkeepers. Victims were frequently tortured before being killed, with instances of breaking of limbs, stabbings and even decapitations, as outlined by the findings of the Sisak General Hospital.

Most of the liquidations of Sisak Serbs are linked to the Special Police Unit "Vukovi" (named after Branko Vuk, the unit's commander who died) and the reserve police unit, the Handžar Division, which was stationed in the suburbs of Sisak, and was so named because its members were Muslims. However, they could not have accomplished the crimes without the knowledge of the city's police apparatus. The "ORA" complex in the city of Galdovo along with the Iodine Spa, was the most notorious torture and execution site.

The establishment of a military organization in the former community of municipalities of Sisak began on 3 June 1991. At the end of the month, Slobodni tjednik published an article denouncing sixteen people from Sisak as collaborators of the Yugoslav Counterintelligence Service (KOS) and opponents of Croatia. Two of them were liquidated.

From the beginning of July to mid-August, the Police Department recorded at least 15 cases of explosives being planted and blowing up houses and businesses owned by Sisak Serbs, and "in the same period, almost daily cases of gunfire being fired at houses, businesses and personal vehicles owned by Serbs were recorded". The Serbian Orthodox Church in Sisak was damaged by explosives on 16 July, and on two nights – 27 and 28 July – a number of buildings owned by Serbs were damaged by explosives.

In early August, an engineer and advisor at the Sisak Refinery, Đorđe Letić, was found dead in an apartment in Sisak. His death was one of the few reported in the local press and linked to the climate of violence affecting Serbs. On 4 August, bus driver Vlado Božić was detained by reserve police under Mate Brajković, beaten in the Odra community centre, and died the same evening as a result of injuries.

Crimes committed by rebel Serbs and the Yugoslav People's Army (JNA) in the region of Banija against Croats were reflected on Sisak Serbs and also created an atmosphere of collective guilt which was promulgated by newspapers such as Jedinstvo who referred to Serbs as "Chetnik terrorists". As a result of the violent atmosphere, many Serbs left Sisak in the summer of 1991. Some estimates state that every third Serb left Sisak. According to Amnesty International, as many as 21 Serb villagers were thought to have been killed on 22 August 1991 in several villages when "Croatian security forces undertook a house-to-house search for Serbian paramilitaries who had fired mortars at the town of Sisak".

Towards late August, 62-year-old Miloš Brkić was brought to the Sisak hospital from the police station, after being beaten to death there. An autopsy determined that he had died a violent death caused by crushing of the chest; the tips of the first three fingers of his left hand had been severed, and—among other injuries—a triple serial fracture of all the ribs on the left side was found.

On 23 August, 26-year-old Zoran Vranešević, a former ethnic Serb Croatian police officer who had signed a declaration of loyalty to the Republic of Croatia, was stopped at a checkpoint in Odra Sisačka by members of the reserve police and taken into custody as he attempted to reach his father's funeral. He was taken to an unknown location and killed. His body was found several days later near Sisak, having suffered gunshot wounds.

Not all of the killings were planned. On 24 August, an altercation occurred at a tavern between Željko Vila and Josip Košutić, which was stopped by bystander Zdravko Slivar. As Vila retreated home, he was approached by Silvar; thinking it was Košutić, Vila stabbed Silvar who eventually succumbed to his injuries at a hospital. That same evening, members of the Vukovi found Vila, beat him and executed him. Evica and Marko Vila (Željko's parents), and Dušan and Mlađo Vila (Željko's brothers) were subsequently taken to "ORA" and then to a ferry on the Sava River, towards Sunja. They were each shot and executed, their bodies found in the river at different spots and dates. From 24-26 August, civilian Branko Oljača, as well as three members of the Trivkanović family were also killed. In the autumn of 1991, in Zagreb, the head of production at the Sisak Refinery, Damjan Žilić, was beaten and killed.

On 2 October 1991, Croatian President Franjo Tuđman received a report from his adviser Stjepan Herceg which stated that there was evidence of illegal arrests and disappearances of "peaceful Serbian citizens", with multiple killings already being documented. The report criticized police inaction and recommended further investigation and prosecution of those responsible. Atrocities and abuses against Serbs continued despite the report. 12 more were reported to have been killed in March 1992, some of whom were workers at the city's oil refinery.

It is estimated that over one hundred Croatian Serb civilians were killed in Sisak during the war. The bodies of 64 victims have been exhumed.

== Trial ==
In 2004, Amnesty International noted that "some of those who may have directly committed, ordered or tolerated [crimes in Sisak], or may have participated in their subsequent cover-up, remain in powerful positions at the local level of state institutions or in the police and are thus still in a position to undermine the investigation of these crimes."

Vladimir Milanković, wartime deputy police commander of the Sisak area, and Drago Bosnjak, a former member of the Sisak special police unit "Vukovi" went on trial in 2012 for war crimes. In 2013, Milanković was convicted of ordering illegal arrests and not punishing crimes against Serb civilians such as illegal detentions, threats, and mental and physical abuses which resulted in the deaths of 24 people between mid-July 1991 and mid-June 1992. He was initially sentenced to eight years, before the Supreme Court upheld his conviction in 2014 and increased the sentence to ten years. Bosnjak was acquitted. On 20 June 2011, Đuro Brodarac, the wartime police chief of Sisak, was arrested along with Milanković and Bosnjak but died on 13 July as a result of heart problems, thereby annulling his case. He had been charged for the deaths of 31 civilians among at least 69 who were illegally detained and tortured.

== Sources ==
- Ponoš, Tihomir (2020). "Sisak 1990. — 1991.: ratni zločini nad Srbima". Tragovi : časopis za srpske i hrvatske teme. 3 (2).
