= Raúl González =

Spanish footballer (born 1977)

Raúl
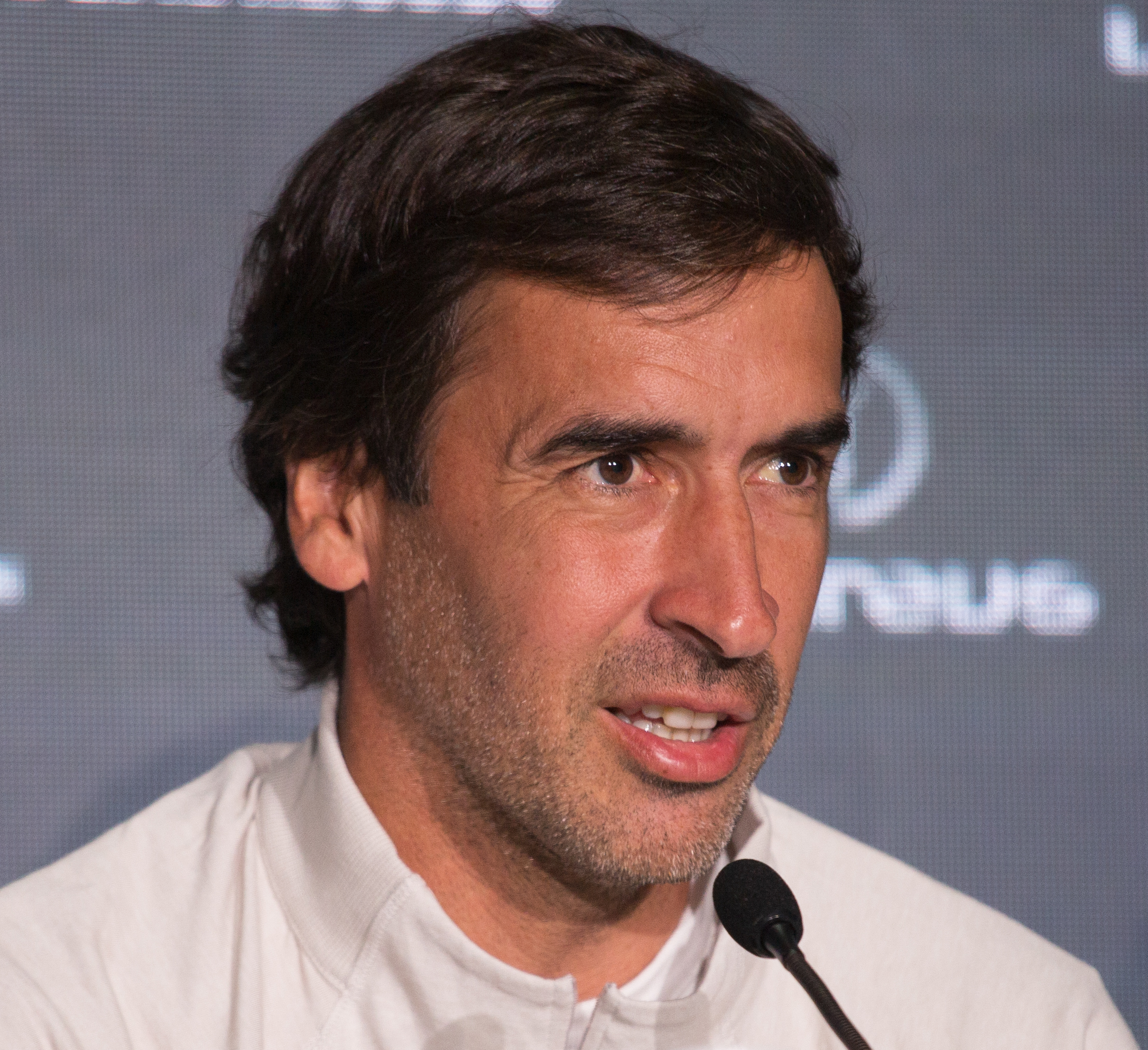
- Raúl in 2024

Personal information
- Full name: Raúl González Blanco
- Date of birth: 27 June 1977 (age 49)
- Place of birth: Madrid, Spain
- Height: 1.80 m (5 ft 11 in)
- Positions: Forward; attacking midfielder

Team information
- Current team: Oviedo (manager)

Youth career
- 1987–1990: San Cristóbal
- 1990–1992: Atlético Madrid
- 1992–1994: Real Madrid

Senior career*
Years	Team	Apps	(Gls)
1994	Real Madrid C	9	(16)
1994	Real Madrid B	1	(0)
1994–2010	Real Madrid	550	(228)
2010–2012	Schalke 04	66	(28)
2012–2014	Al Sadd	39	(11)
2014–2015	New York Cosmos	28	(8)
Total		693	(291)

International career
1994	Spain U18	2	(4)
1995	Spain U20	5	(3)
1995–1996	Spain U21	9	(8)
1996	Spain Olympic	4	(2)
1996–2006	Spain	102	(44)

Managerial career
- 2019–2025: Real Madrid Castilla
- 2026–: Oviedo
Medal record
Men's football
Representing Spain
UEFA European Under-21 Championship
Runner-up	1996 Spain
- * Club domestic league appearances and goals

Raúl González Blanco (Spanish pronunciation: [raˈul ɣonˈθaleθ ˈβlaŋko]; born 27 June 1977), known mononymously as Raúl, is a Spanish professional football manager and former player who played as a second forward and attacking midfielder. He is currently the manager of Segunda División club Real Oviedo. Regarded as one of the greatest strikers of all time, Raúl made over 1,000 appearances in his career and stands as the all-time Spanish top goalscorer in the UEFA Champions League with 71 goals.

Raúl spent 16 years of his career playing for Real Madrid, becoming the holder for most appearances with the club (741). With Los Blancos, he won six La Liga titles, three Champions Leagues, four Supercopa de España titles, one UEFA Super Cup, and two Intercontinental Cups. In 2001, he was runner-up in the Ballon d'Or, and two years later became captain of Real Madrid. Raúl left the club in 2010 with 323 goals scored for them, signing for Bundesliga side Schalke 04. He won a DFB-Pokal and DFL-Supercup in Germany before moving to Qatar Stars League club Al Sadd and then North American Soccer League club New York Cosmos. For Spain, Raúl scored 44 goals in 102 appearances and is regarded as one of his nation's greatest ever players. He represented La Roja in three FIFA World Cups and two UEFA European Championships, being named in the Team of the Tournament for Euro 2000. He became the captain of the national team in 2002 and retired from international football in 2006.

One of the most successful players in Champions League history, Raúl was named the UEFA Club Forward of the Year three years in a row (1999–2000, 2000–01 and 2001–02) and was the top goalscorer in the competition in 1999–2000 and 2000–01. He was named the top international goalscorer in the world by International Federation of Football History & Statistics in 1999. Further awards include two Pichichi trophies, five Don Balón Awards, and the Best Player award at the 1998 Intercontinental Cup. In 2004, he was named in the FIFA 100 list of the world's greatest living players and was named in UEFA’s list of the 50 best European players of the 1954–2004 period. He was named in the European Team of the Year by European Sports Media in 1997, 1999, and 2000.

== Club career ==
=== Youth clubs ===
Raúl's career began at his local team CD San Cristóbal de los Ángeles playing for their Alevín team and the Infantil the next season. He signed with Atlético Madrid's Infantil team and won a national title with the Cadete team the following season. Following Atlético's then-president Jesús Gil decision to close their youth academy as a cost-saving measure, Raúl moved on to Real Madrid's Cadete team in La Fábrica. The following season, he was promoted to the Juvenil C team and subsequently went on to play for their Juvenil B and Juvenil A team. While with the Real youth set-up, Raúl won the Dallas Cup in 1993 and 1994.

=== Real Madrid ===
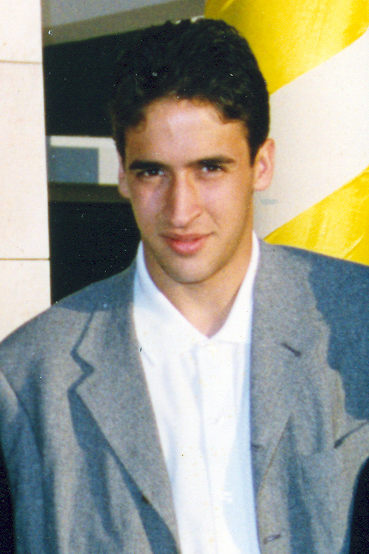
Raúl in 1995

He first started his professional career in the 1994–95 season with Real Madrid C. He scored 16 goals in just nine games (including five in one match against CD Corralejo) and was swiftly promoted to the first team by coach Jorge Valdano, replacing Emilio Butragueño in a symbolic "passing of the crown". He became the youngest player – 17 years and 124 days – ever to play for the senior side, though the record was broken by Alberto Rivera later that same season. On 29 October 1994, in an away game against Real Zaragoza at La Romareda, he created a goal for strike partner Iván Zamorano, heralding the demise of Butragueño in the process. The next week, Raúl scored his first goal in his second senior game on a home debut against Madrid rivals and former youth club Atlético Madrid in a bitter derby match. Fully establishing himself as a fixture in the first team, Raúl registered a total of nine goals in 28 appearances to help Real Madrid win the 1994–95 league championship in his first season.

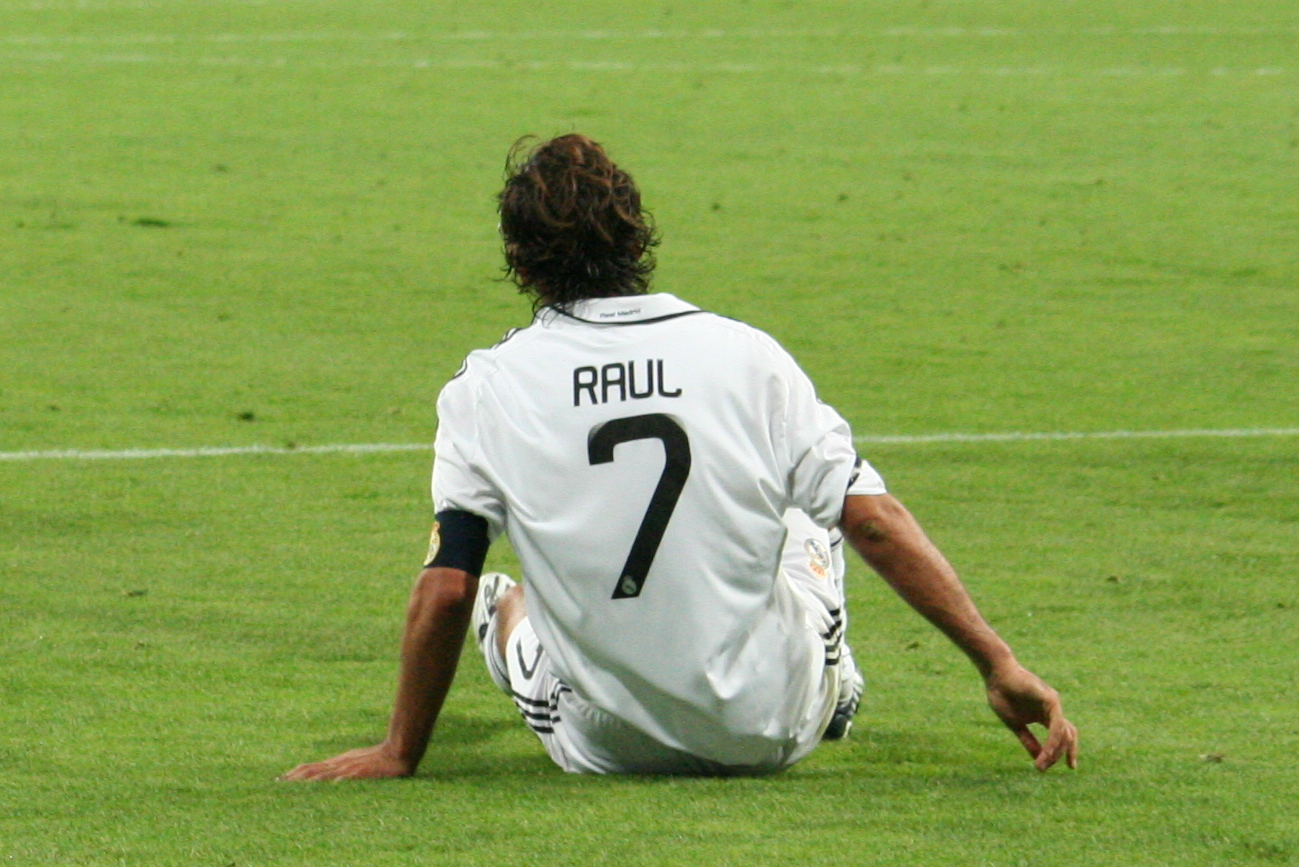
Raúl wore the number 7 shirt for Real Madrid between 1996 and 2010.

With Real Madrid, he won several honours at the club, including further La Liga titles in 1996–97 (scoring 21 La Liga goals), 2000–01 (scoring 24 La Liga goals), and 2002–03 (scoring 16 La Liga goals in a campaign truncated by a bout of appendicitis for which Raúl was hospitalised). During the period from 1998 to 2002, Raúl and Real Madrid also won three UEFA Champions League trophies in 1998, 2000, and 2002. For most of this time, Raúl struck up a prolific scoring partnership with Fernando Morientes and later Ronaldo. During a La Liga game against fierce rivals Barcelona at the Camp Nou in October 1999, Raúl silenced the hostile home crowd of almost 100,000 fans when he scored and then memorably celebrated his goal by putting a finger to his lips as though to tell them to be quiet. Raúl took over the captaincy of Real Madrid when Fernando Hierro was transferred in 2003, a responsibility he held until leaving the club in 2010. Despite appearing in two finals, in 2002 (in which he scored) and 2004, Raúl never lifted the Copa del Rey.

He became the first player to score 50 Champions League goals when he scored in a 2–1 group stage win over Olympiacos on 28 September 2005, and was also the first to make 100 appearances in the competition. He was also the first player to score in two Champions League finals, since the competition was renamed, scoring in the finals of both 2000 against Valencia in the Stade de France, Saint-Denis, and 2002 against Bayer Leverkusen at Hampden Park, Glasgow.

Raúl holds the distinction of having never been sent off in his 17 years at the professional level. On 11 November 2008, Raúl scored his 300th goal for Real Madrid with a hat-trick against Real Unión, with Real winning the match 4–3 but being eliminated on away goals after drawing 6–6 on aggregate. In total, Raúl scored 323 goals for Real Madrid, breaking the long-standing club record of Alfredo Di Stéfano (307) with a volleyed goal against Sporting de Gijón on 15 February 2009. He is presently fifth on the all-time list of La Liga goalscorers, behind Argentine Lionel Messi, Portuguese Cristiano Ronaldo, Spaniard Telmo Zarra and Mexican Hugo Sánchez.

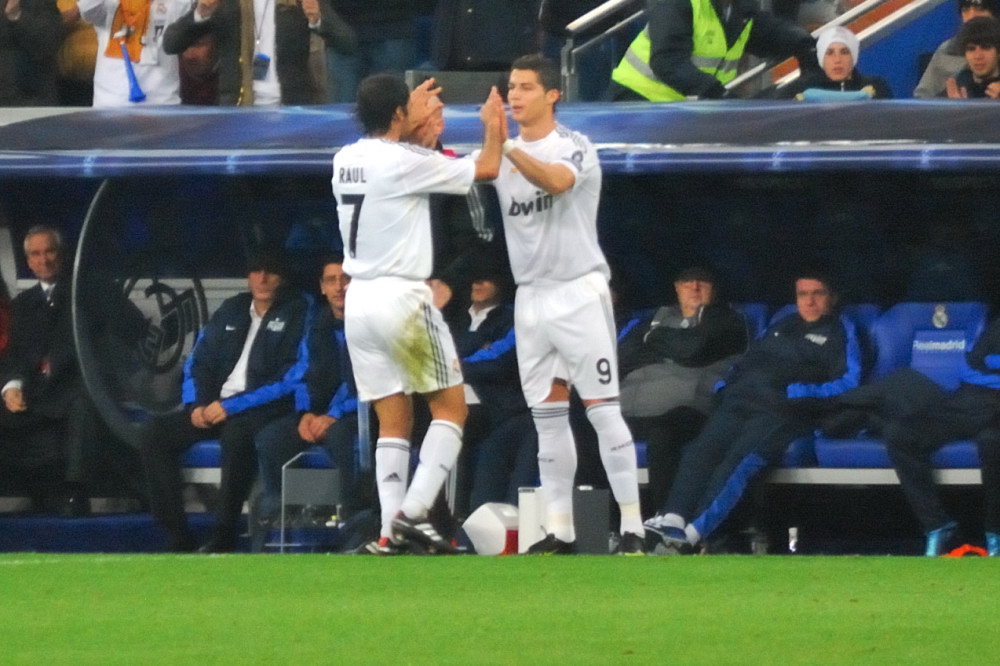
Raúl gets substituted for Cristiano Ronaldo, who would inherit the number 7 in the following season.

Raúl and fellow long-serving teammate Iker Casillas were both awarded "contracts for life" in 2008, the terms of which stipulated that the contracts would be renewed annually for as long as they played 30 matches each season. On 23 September 2009, Raúl equalled Manolo Sanchís' league appearance record for Real Madrid, and is second in La Liga behind Andoni Zubizarreta, who played in 622 matches.

Along with years of captaincy for both Real Madrid and Spain, Raúl was known as "El Capitán" ("The Captain").

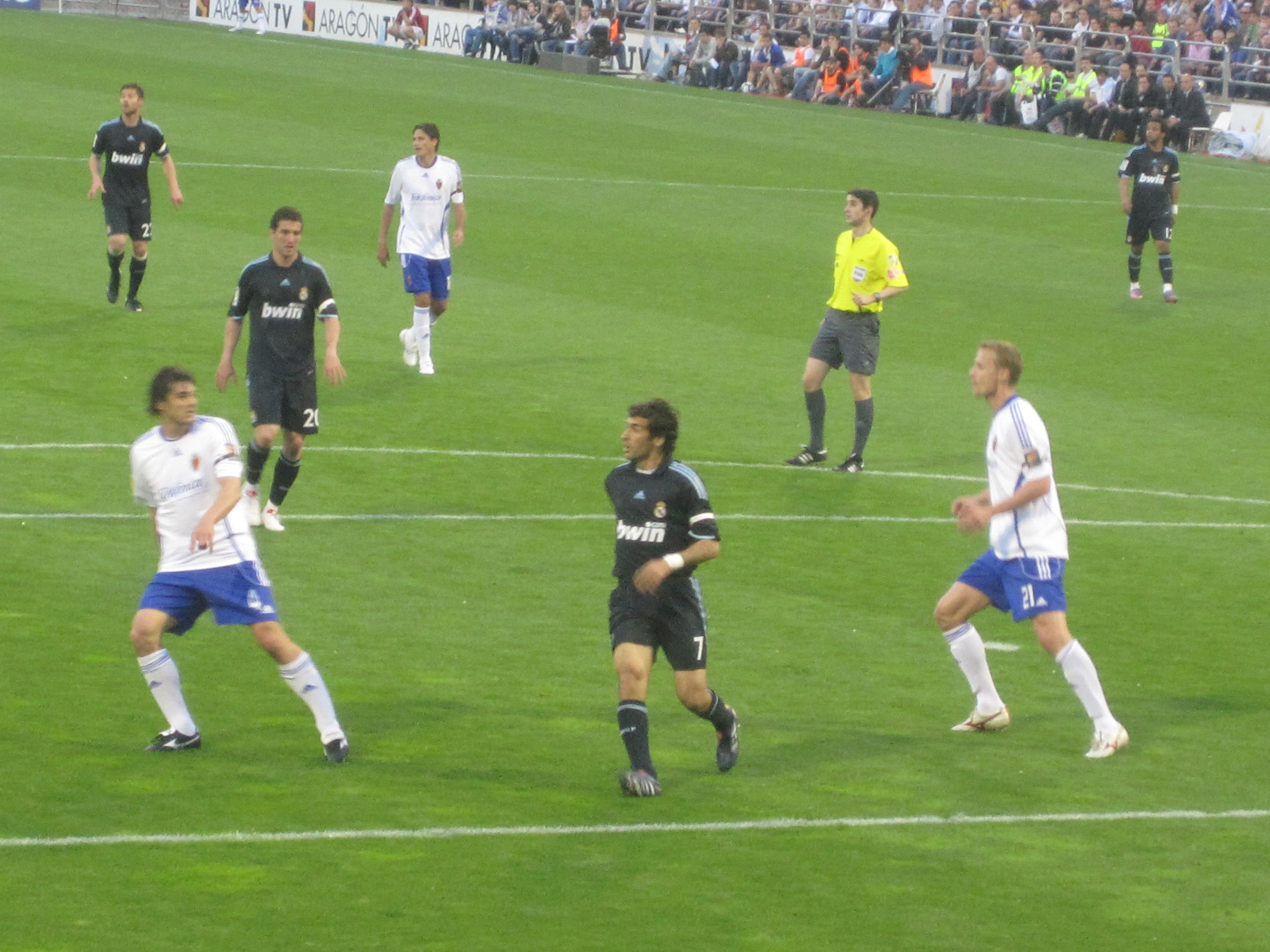
Raúl in his last match with Real Madrid in a La Liga match against Real Zaragoza

Raúl's last touch with the ball as a Real Madrid player before an injury ruled him out of action for the rest of that season was to score his last goal, the opening goal scored on 24 April 2010 in a 2–1 away victory against Real Zaragoza in La Romareda, coincidentally the stadium where he made his debut in 1994. It was scored in the 50th minute after Raúl (himself only on the pitch as a substitute for Rafael van der Vaart after 15 minutes) had signalled he could not physically continue and was prepared to be substituted off for Karim Benzema one minute after the goal. Before the substitution could be made, Real Madrid launched a counter-attack to create a goal. Though Raúl ran to a slow hobble, he shuffled into the box and was able to poke the ball from Cristiano Ronaldo's pass.

Having spent the rest of the season recovering from that injury, the club confirmed on 25 July 2010 that Raúl would be leaving the club, a day after his teammate Guti confirmed he was also leaving after a 15-year spell.

=== Schalke 04 ===
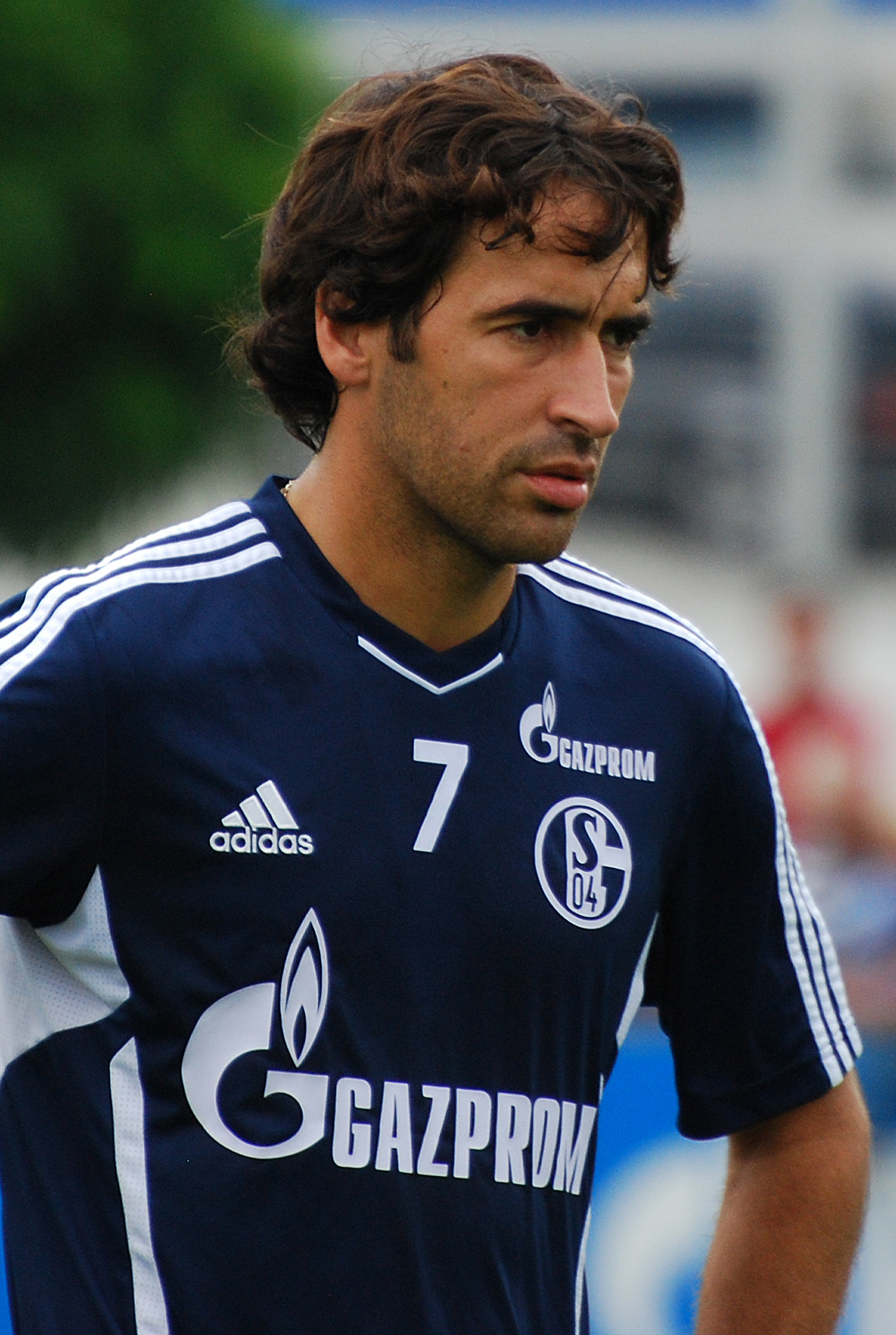
Raúl in a training session with Schalke 04 in August 2011

Raúl signed a two-year contract with Schalke 04 on 28 July 2010. Schalke head coach Felix Magath hailed the signing and told the club website, "It's great news for FC Schalke 04, I am pleased that we have succeeded in signing such an exceptional footballer and world-class striker switching to the Bundesliga for Schalke 04." Raúl chose Schalke because they qualified for the 2010–11 UEFA Champions League.

Raúl scored his first goal for the club during his first match on 1 August 2010 with a brace in a 3–1 victory over Bayern Munich in the final match of the pre-season competition LIGA total! Cup 2010. One week later, he made his competitive debut in the 2010 DFL-Supercup on 7 August 2010 again against Bayern, but this time he failed to score in the 2–0 defeat. Raúl made his Bundesliga debut on 21 August 2010 in a 2–1 defeat against Hamburger SV. and scored his first goal for Schalke in the Bundesliga against Borussia Mönchengladbach on 25 September 2010 in a 2–2 draw. After a quiet start, he rediscovered his goalscoring form in the Bundesliga with a brace against FC St. Pauli on 5 November in a 3–0 win, and on 20 November, he scored his first hat-trick for the club in a 4–0 win over Werder Bremen. On 18 December, he scored his second hat-trick for Schalke in a 3–0 win against 1. FC Köln.

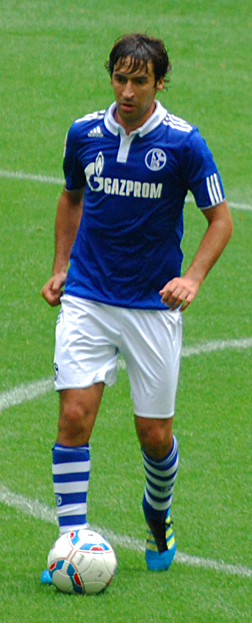
Raúl with Schalke in 2011

Raúl scored another crucial goal on 2 March 2011 in a 1–0 victory over Bayern Munich in the semi-final of 2010–11 DFB-Pokal. After being absent for six years, Schalke ultimately reached the finals since 2005. In the final match, they played against MSV Duisburg, the first 2. Bundesliga team which reached the final since 2004. Raúl never won a domestic cup with Real Madrid (the Copa del Rey), but on 21 May 2011, in his first season, he finally won a domestic cup and got his maiden trophy with his new club. They won the tournament with a 5–0 win at the Olympiastadion in Berlin. This success was followed with victory two months later on 23 July 2011 in the 2011 DFL-Supercup against the league champions and rivals Borussia Dortmund.

In European play, Raúl has since become the highest goalscorer in all UEFA competitions with 73 goals, ahead of Milan veteran Filippo Inzaghi with 70 goals. He scored 71 goals in the Champions League (66 goals with Real Madrid and five with Schalke 04) and in addition his two goals with Los Blancos, one goal in the 2000 UEFA Super Cup and the other one in the 1998 Intercontinental Cup. On 22 October 2010, Raúl scored twice against Hapoel Tel Aviv in a 3–1 win, which tied him with German legend Gerd Müller for the most European goals. Raúl fully broke this record on 15 February 2011 on his return to Spain with a crucial away goal in the round of 16 tie against Valencia at the Mestalla Stadium in a 1–1 draw.

In the quarter-finals, Raúl scored two goals against Internazionale: one goal in the first leg, a 5–2 away win at the San Siro, and one in the second leg, a 2–1 home win at the Veltins-Arena. Schalke progressed to the semi-finals of the UEFA Champions League for the first time in their history, where they played against Manchester United. Schalke lost the first match 2–0, which was their first home defeat this season in the tournament, and lost again 4–1 in Old Trafford. Despite the defeat, Raúl considered it an honour that he had swapped shirts with Ryan Giggs. On 19 November 2011, he captained Schalke for the first time due to an injury to Benedikt Höwedes in a 4–0 home win against 1. FC Nürnberg. He also scored the second goal and assisted the fourth in that match.

Raúl scored another hat-trick against Werder Bremen on 17 December 2011. The goals came in a 5–0 win that cemented Schalke's position in third place going into the winter break. On 19 February 2012, he scored the 400th goal of his career; at that time he had scored 323 with Real Madrid, 44 with Spain and 33 with Schalke. On 5 April 2012, in the second leg of the UEFA Europa League match against Athletic Bilbao, he scored his 77th goal in a European competition.

With his goal in the semifinals of the German Cup against Bayern Munich at the Allianz Arena, together with his team, he qualified for the final of said competition. His great performances in the European Cup this season earned him to be included in the best eleven of the competition awarded by UEFA.

At a press conference on 19 April 2012, Raúl announced he would leave Schalke after his contract expired in June, and that "[his] future is not in Europe". Raúl had such an impact at Schalke that, on his departure, the club opted to retire the number 7 shirt for an indefinite period. However, in 2013, the number 7 shirt was given to Max Meyer, Schalke's new prodigy.

=== Al Sadd ===
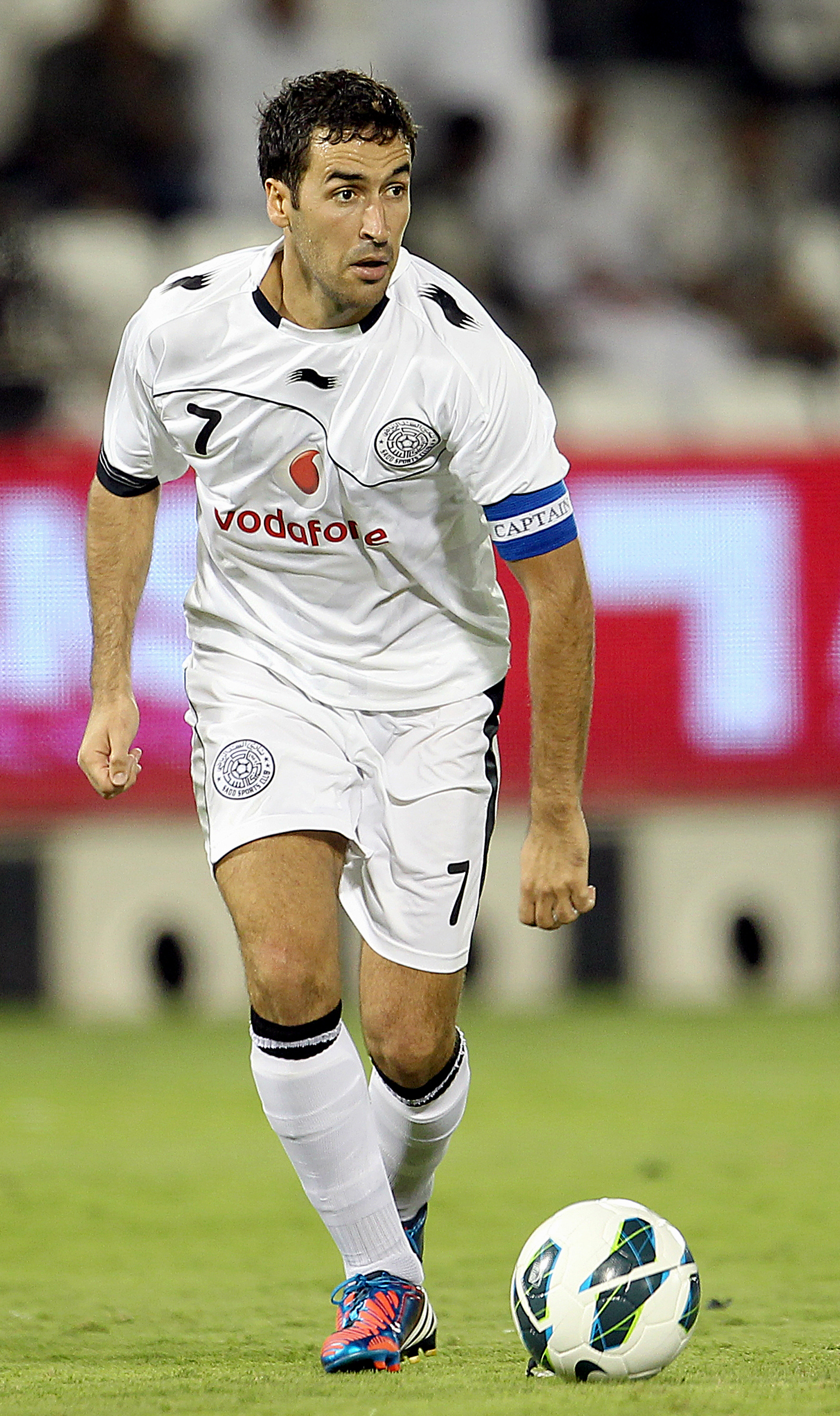
Raúl playing for Al Sadd in 2012

On 12 May 2012, it was announced Raúl had signed a deal with Qatari Football Club Al Sadd for the 2012–13 Qatar Stars League season. He played his first competitive match for the club on 5 August in the 2012 Sheikh Jassim Cup, scoring a penalty in extra time in order to secure a 2–0 win against Mesaimeer. The veteran also took on the role of captain after Abdulla Koni was substituted. On 13 April 2013, Raúl captained Al Sadd to the 2012–13 Qatar Stars League title. Raúl scored 9 goals in 22 appearances to help Al Sadd win their first title in five years. He scored in the 2013 Emir of Qatar Cup final defeat to Al Rayyan. Raúl was also presented with the post-season QFA-sanctioned Fair Play Award in May 2013, while he had also been shortlisted for QSL Player of the Year award.

On 22 August 2013, Raúl played for Real Madrid in the first half of the Trofeo Santiago Bernabéu and scored the first goal. He then played the second half for Al Sadd as Real Madrid won 5–0. On 5 March 2014, Raúl announced he would retire from professional football at the end of the Qatari football season.

=== New York Cosmos ===
On 30 October 2014, Raúl returned to professional football and signed with the New York Cosmos in the United States. He made his North American Soccer League (NASL) debut on 4 April 2015 in a 1–0 win against the Fort Lauderdale Strikers, partially owned by his former Real Madrid strike partner Ronaldo, leaving with a hamstring injury in the second half. The following week, at the Indy Eleven, he scored his first goal to equalise in a 1–1 draw. Raúl scored four times as the undefeated Cosmos won the spring season with five wins and five draws.

On 16 October 2015, it was again announced Raúl would retire at the end of the season. The Cosmos finished with the best regular season record, winning the North American Supporters' Trophy. On 7 November, he scored the winning goal as his team came from behind to win 2–1 against the Strikers in the semi-finals, earning a place at Soccer Bowl 2015, which they won 3–2 against the Ottawa Fury eight days later. Raúl set up the third and final goal for Gaston Cellerino's hat-trick. He reiterated his decision to retire after the Soccer Bowl.

== International career ==
Raúl began his Spain career at the youth level and represented the nation at the 1995 FIFA U-20 World Cup, scoring three goals from five matches. He was also part of the under-21 side that reached the final of the 1996 UEFA European Under-21 Championship, and even scored his side's temporary equaliser in the final, although he later missed his penalty in the resulting shoot-out, which was won by Italy. In total, he scored 17 goals at the various youth levels for Spain.

With the senior team, Raúl went on for many years to score a national record 44 goals in 102 caps for Spain. However, David Villa later equalled Raúl's record in 2010 and surpassed it on 25 March 2011 in a UEFA Euro 2012 qualifier. Of his 44 international goals, Raúl scored 32 goals in competitive matches, six of which were in the finals of major tournaments. He is regarded as one of his nation's greatest ever players.

=== 1998 FIFA World Cup ===
On 9 October 1996, Raúl debuted for the Spanish senior squad against the Czech Republic, playing 90 minutes of a goalless 1998 FIFA World Cup qualification draw at the Letná Stadion in Prague. In his third match on 14 December against FR Yugoslavia at the Mestalla Stadium, he recorded his first international goal in a 2–0 qualifying victory. At the final tournament in France, Raúl featured in every match as Spain were eliminated from Group D. He scored in their opening match to put them 2–1 up in an eventual 2–3 loss to Nigeria in Nantes.

=== UEFA Euro 2000 ===
On 27 March 1999, in a UEFA Euro 2000 qualifier, Raúl scored four goals in Spain's 9–0 rout of Austria. Four days later, he scored three goals in a 6–0 away win against San Marino during the same qualifying tournament. On 5 June, against the same opponents in Villarreal, he was again on target in a 9–0 rout. Raúl played every minute of Spain's Euro 2000 finals campaign in Belgium and the Netherlands. He scored the first goal in their 2–1 win over Slovenia at the Amsterdam Arena. Spain were knocked out in the quarter-finals by eventual champions France; Raúl missed a last-minute penalty which would have taken the tie to extra-time.

=== 2002 FIFA World Cup ===
At the 2002 FIFA World Cup in South Korea and Japan, Raúl opened a 3–1 win over the Slovenes in Spain's first Group B match, and added two more in a 3–2 win over South Africa in Daejeon to advance as group winners. He suffered a groin injury in the round of 16 win over the Republic of Ireland, and missed the remainder of the tournament, in which Spain went out to South Korea in the quarter-finals.

=== UEFA Euro 2004 ===
On 7 September 2002, Raúl scored in a 2–0 away win over Greece in Euro 2004 qualifying, putting him on 29 goals in 56 international games, equalling the national goalscoring record set by the recently retired Fernando Hierro. He broke the record on 12 February 2003 when he scored twice in a 3–1 friendly win over Germany at Son Moix in Palma, Mallorca. He started every match at the Euro 2004 finals in Portugal, in which Spain crashed out at the group stage.

=== 2006 FIFA World Cup ===
Raúl earned his 89th cap on 8 October 2005 in a 2–0 away win over Belgium in 2006 World Cup qualifying, levelling with Hierro as Spain's most-capped outfield player. However, he played less frequently across the campaign as new manager Luis Aragonés preferred to partner David Villa and Fernando Torres.

At the final tournament in Germany, he came on at half-time for Luis García in the second group match in Stuttgart, with Spain trailing Tunisia 0–1. When goalkeeper Ali Boumnijel could not retain Cesc Fàbregas' shot in the 72nd minute, Raúl equalised from close range as Spain eventually won 3–1.

On 15 August 2006, Raúl won his 100th cap for Spain, in a goalless friendly draw with Iceland in Reykjavík. He was last chosen for the national team on 6 September, in a 3–2 defeat against Northern Ireland in Belfast, a match in which he hit the post late on.

Aragonés and Raúl fell out after the Northern Ireland match, with the manager stating he would never choose Raúl again. The cause of friction was Aragonés's policy that all players had to sleep at Madrid–Barajas Airport after away games, so that those like Raúl who lived in the capital city would not have the privilege of returning home one night earlier.

== Managerial career ==
=== Real Madrid U15s ===
On 17 August 2018, Raúl was appointed youth coach at Real Madrid, taking charge of the Cadete B (under-15) squad.

=== Real Madrid Castilla ===
On 20 June 2019, he was appointed manager of Real Madrid Castilla. His debut on 25 August was a 1–1 draw at Las Rozas in Segunda División B.

Raúl's team made the promotion playoffs in 2021, losing to the seeded Ibiza after a goalless draw in the semi-finals. He then talked down rumours that he would replace his former teammate Zinedine Zidane as first-team manager.

Two years later, Castilla again made the playoffs, in the new Primera Federación. The final against Eldense went to extra time and a 3–3 draw in the second leg, with the team from the Valencian Community winning promotion due to a better regular season finish. Raúl's press conference after the game was cancelled for security reasons due to an invasion of the pitch and facilities by celebrating fans of the home team.

In 2024–25, Castilla were in the relegation zone at the turn of the year, but ended the season near the promotion playoffs. Raúl announced his exit, having been overlooked for the first-team job that went to Xabi Alonso; he was succeeded at Castilla by Álvaro Arbeloa.

=== Oviedo ===
On 9 November 2026, second division club Real Oviedo appointed Raul as their new manager for a contract of two years ending in 2028.

== Player profile ==
=== Style of play ===
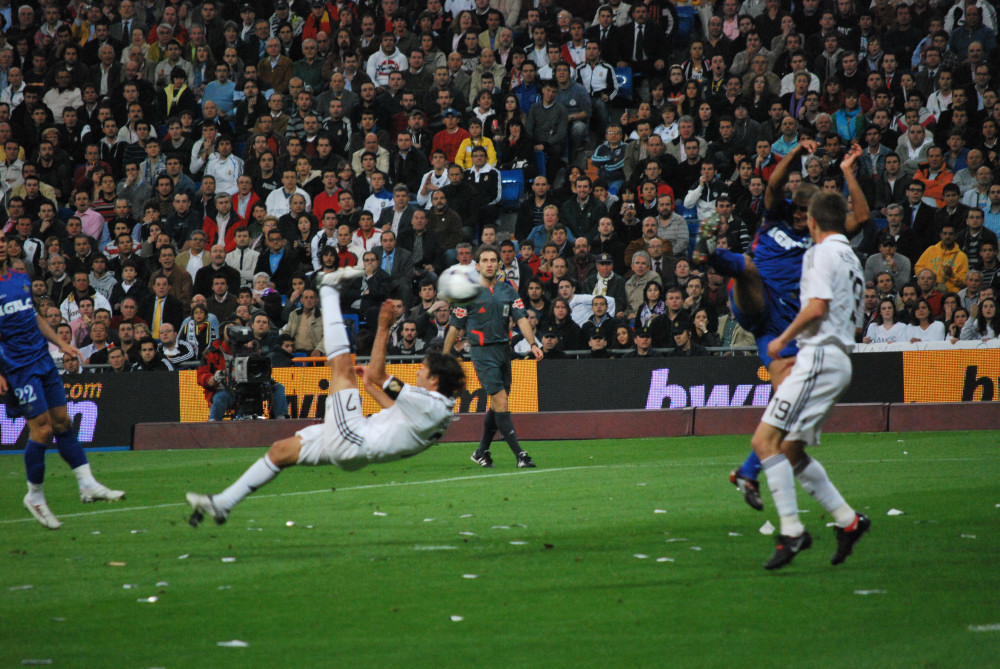
Raúl executing a bicycle kick for Real Madrid in 2009

Raúl is widely regarded as one of the greatest forwards of all time. He wore the number 7 jersey for most of his career and mainly played as a second forward and attacking midfielder, playing behind one or two pure strikers, behing in a free role given total freedom across the midfield and attack to organize, support and score goals. He also played as a winger and a left and right midfielder under Fabio Capello. He was a left-footed player considered ambidextrous who was capable of scoring goals from any distance, and he often scored goals using chips. He possessed excellent ball control, vision, and aerial ability.

Although widely recognised for his clinical finishing and goalscoring record, Raúl was equally renowned for his creativity, technical ability, work rate, and vision, which made him a highly complete and versatile forward..

=== Reception ===
In addition to these characteristics, Raúl is remembered for his leadership and discipline, as he never received a red card and he was rarely booked. For his speed, elegance, and goalscoring, he was nicknamed "El Ferrari", or "The Ferrari", by compatriot Fernando Hierro, another emblematic Real Madrid player. He was also an accurate penalty taker. In 2013, former England centre-back Rio Ferdinand praised Raúl for his clever movement off the ball, and his ability to exploit gaps in defenses, describing him as: "the most intelligent player [he'd] played against."

== Media ==
Raúl has been sponsored by German sportswear company Adidas. He has advertised Adidas Predator football boots, and in 2004, Adidas made a commercial featuring him and other players on mopeds, including Zinedine Zidane, Michael Ballack, Alessandro Del Piero, and David Trezeguet.

Raúl has featured in Pepsi commercials, including an advertisement for the 2002 World Cup in Korea and Japan, where he and other players including David Beckham, Roberto Carlos, and Gianluigi Buffon took on a team of Sumo players.

Raúl features in EA Sports' FIFA video game series. His regular goal celebration of kissing the ring finger – a show of affection to his wife – appears in FIFA 18; because of his celebration, he is also nicknamed "Lord of the Rings".

== Personal life ==
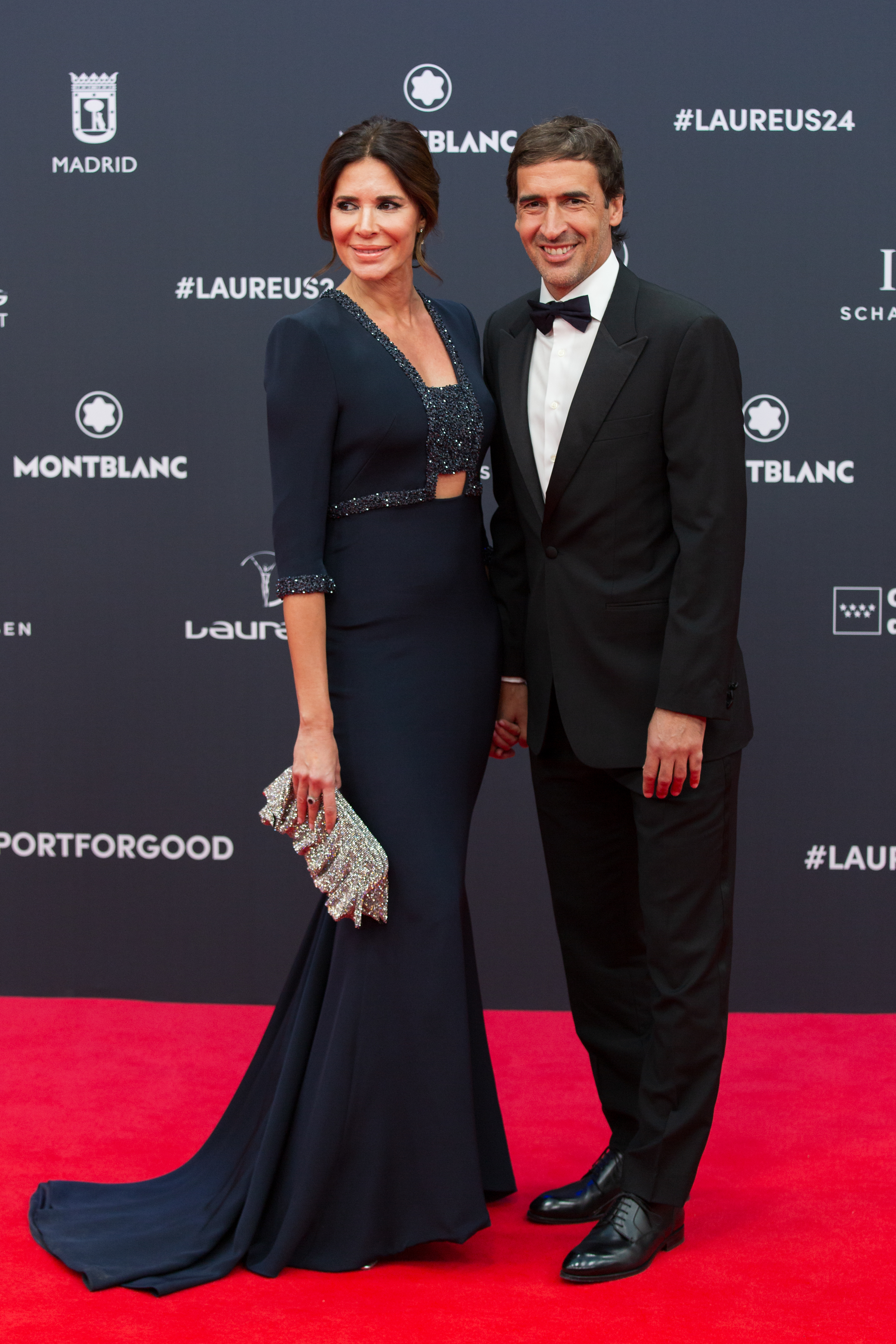
Raúl with his wife in 2024

Raúl married Mamen Sanz in 1999 and the couple have five children: Jorge, Hugo, Héctor, Mateo, and María. Jorge and Hugo were both playing football in New York in 2016; Jorge at Fordham Preparatory School, and Hugo in New York City FC's academy. In 2022, his daughter Maria was signed by Real Madrid's U15 football team.

== Career statistics ==
=== Club ===
Appearances and goals by club, season and competition
Club	Season	League			National cup (Note: Includes Copa del Rey, DFB-Pokal, Emir Cup, U.S. Open Cup)		Continental (Note: All appearances in UEFA Champions League, unless otherwise noted)		Other		Total	
Club	Season	Division	Apps	Goals	Apps	Goals	Apps	Goals	Apps	Goals	Apps	Goals
Real Madrid C	1994–95	Segunda División B	9	16	—		—		—		9	16
Real Madrid B	1994–95	Segunda División	1	0	—		—		—		1	0
Real Madrid	1994–95	La Liga	28	9	2	1	0	0	—		30	10
Real Madrid	1995–96	La Liga	40	19	2	1	8	6	2 (Note: Appearances in Supercopa de España)	0	52	26
Real Madrid	1996–97	La Liga	42	21	5	1	—		—		47	22
Real Madrid	1997–98	La Liga	35	10	1	0	11	2	2	3	49	15
Real Madrid	1998–99	La Liga	37	25	2	0	8	3	2 (Note: One appearance in UEFA Super Cup, one appearance and one goal in Intercontinental Cup)	1	49	29
Real Madrid	1999–2000	La Liga	34	17	4	0	15	10	4 (Note: Appearances in FIFA Club World Championship)	2	57	29
Real Madrid	2000–01	La Liga	36	24	0	0	12	7	2 (Note: One appearance and one goal in UEFA Super Cup, one appearance in Intercontinental Cup)	1	50	32
Real Madrid	2001–02	La Liga	35	14	6	6	12	6	2	3	55	29
Real Madrid	2002–03	La Liga	31	16	2	0	12	9	2 (Note: One appearance in UEFA Super Cup, one appearance in Intercontinental Cup)	0	47	25
Real Madrid	2003–04	La Liga	35	11	7	6	9	2	2	1	53	20
Real Madrid	2004–05	La Liga	32	9	1	0	10	4	—		43	13
Real Madrid	2005–06	La Liga	26	5	0	0	6	2	—		32	7
Real Madrid	2006–07	La Liga	35	7	1	0	7	5	—		43	12
Real Madrid	2007–08	La Liga	37	18	1	0	8	5	2	0	48	23
Real Madrid	2008–09	La Liga	37	18	1	3	7	3	2	0	47	24
Real Madrid	2009–10	La Liga	30	5	2	0	7	2	—		39	7
Real Madrid	Total		550	228	37	18	132	66	22	11	741	323
Schalke 04	2010–11	Bundesliga	34	13	4	1	12	5	1 (Note: Appearance in DFL-Supercup)	0	51	19
Schalke 04	2011–12	Bundesliga	32	15	3	2	11 (Note: Appearances in UEFA Europa League)	4	1	0	47	21
Schalke 04	Total		66	28	7	3	23	9	2	0	98	40
Al Sadd	2012–13	Qatar Stars League	22	9	12	3	0	0	—		34	12
Al Sadd	2013–14	Qatar Stars League	17	2	5	2	5 (Note: Appearances in AFC Champions League)	0	—		27	4
Al Sadd	Total		39	11	17	5	5	0	—		61	16
New York Cosmos	2015	NASL	28	8	2	0	—		2 (Note: Appearances in Soccer Bowl)	1	32	9
Career total			693	291	63	26	160	75	26	12	942	404

=== International ===
Appearances and goals by national team and year
National team	Year	Apps	Goals
Spain	1996	4	1
Spain	1997	6	0
Spain	1998	10	4
Spain	1999	9	10
Spain	2000	11	3
Spain	2001	9	5
Spain	2002	9	6
Spain	2003	10	8
Spain	2004	13	3
Spain	2005	12	2
Spain	2006	9	2
Total		102	44

== Managerial statistics ==
As of 22 November 2026

Managerial record by team and tenure
Team	From	To	Record								Ref
Team	From	To	G	W	D	L	GF	GA	GD	Win %	Ref
Real Madrid Castilla	20 June 2019	27 May 2025	209	82	70	57	317	238	+79	39.23	
Oviedo	9 November 2026	present	2	0	0	2	1	5	−4	0.00	
Total			211	82	70	59	318	243	+75	38.86	—

== Honours ==
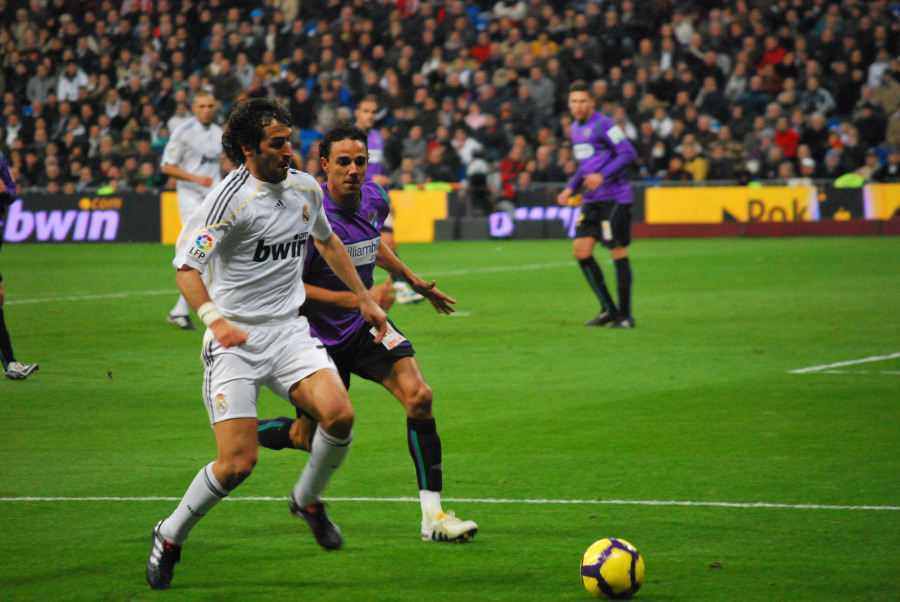
Raúl in his last season with Real Madrid

=== Player ===
Real Madrid Youth

- Dallas Cup: 1993, 1994

Real Madrid

- La Liga: 1994–95, 1996–97, 2000–01, 2002–03, 2006–07, 2007–08
- Supercopa de España: 1997, 2001, 2003, 2008
- UEFA Champions League: 1997–98, 1999–2000, 2001–02
- UEFA Super Cup: 2002
- Intercontinental Cup: 1998, 2002

Schalke 04

- DFB-Pokal: 2010–11
- DFL-Supercup: 2011

Al Sadd

- Qatar Stars League: 2012–13
- Emir of Qatar Cup: 2014

New York Cosmos

- North American Soccer League: Spring Season 2015
- North American Supporters' Trophy: 2015
- Soccer Bowl: 2015

Spain U21

- UEFA European Under-21 Championship runner-up: 1996

Individual

- UEFA European Under-21 Football Championship top goalscorer: 1996
- La Liga's Breakthrough Player: 1994–95
- Zarra Trophy: 1995–96, 1998–99, 2000–01, 2002–03
- La Liga's Best Spanish Player: 1996–97, 1998–99, 1999–2000, 2000–01, 2001–02 (record)
- La Liga's Team of the Decade: 2000s
- ESM Team of the Year: 1996–97, 1998–99, 1999–2000
- Pichichi Trophy: 1998–99, 2000–01
- Copa del Rey top goalscorer: 2001–02, 2003–04
- IFFHS World's Top Goal Scorer: 1999
  - 2nd place: 2001
  - 3rd place: 2003
- UEFA Champions League top goalscorer: 1999–2000, 2000–01
- UEFA Champions League top assist provider: 2002–03
- UEFA Club Forward of the Year: 1999–2000, 2000–01, 2001–02
- UEFA European Football Championship Team of the Tournament: 2000
- Ballon d'Or runner-up: 2001
- FIFA World Player of the Year bronze award: 2001
- FIFA 100
- Trofeo Alfredo Di Stéfano: 2007–08
- Sportske Novosti award: 2001
- Marca Leyenda: 2009
- Golden Foot Award runner-up: 2009, 2010, 2011
- Goal of the Month in Germany: August 2011, March 2012, April 2012, July 2013
- Goal of the Year in Germany: 2011, 2013 (shared with Julian Draxler)
- Qatar Stars League Fair Play Award: 2013
- NASL Player of the Month: May 2015

Records

- Real Madrid Record Appearance Maker: 741 games
- Real Madrid Record Appearance Maker in La Liga: 550 games
- European Competitions Record Appearance Maker: 150^{*}
- Third leading scorer in the world (throughout history), according to IFFHS Statistics: 1215 goals^{^^}

^{*}Includes other European competitive competitions, including the UEFA Cup Winners' Cup, UEFA Intertoto Cup, UEFA Europa League, UEFA Super Cup.
^{^^}Includes other European competitive competitions and Intercontinental Cup.

- Has not received a red card in entire career.

=== Manager ===
Real Madrid U19

- UEFA Youth League: 2019–20

=== Decorations ===
- Government of Spain: Gold Medal of the Royal Order of Sporting Merit 2006
- City of Madrid: Gold Medal 2009

== See also ==
- List of footballers with 100 or more UEFA Champions League appearances
- List of men's footballers with 100 or more international caps
- List of men's footballers with the most official appearances
- List of FIFA World Cup top goalscorers
- List of Real Madrid CF records and statistics
- List of La Liga players (400+ appearances)

== Bibliography ==
- Marcotti, Gabriele (2008). Capello: The Man Behind England's World Cup Dream. Bantam Books. ISBN 978-0-553-82566-4.
