= Slobodna Dalmacija =

Croatian daily newspaper

- Type: Daily newspaper
- Format: Berliner
- Owner: Hanza Media
- Publisher: Hanza Media
- Editor: Sandra Lapenda-Lemo
- Founded: June 17, 1943; 82 years ago
- Language: Croatian
- Headquarters: Hrvatske mornarice 4
- City: Split
- Country: Croatia
- Circulation: 37,000 (2010)
- ISSN: 0350-4662
- Website: www.slobodnadalmacija.hr

Slobodna Dalmacija (lit. 'Free Dalmatia', where "Free" is an adjective) is a Croatian daily newspaper published in Split.

== History ==
Slobodna Dalmacija was first issued on 17 June 1943 by Tito's Partisans in an abandoned stone barn on Mosor, a mountain near Split, while the city was occupied by the Italian army. The paper was later published in various locations until Split was liberated on 26 October 1944. From the following day onward, Slobodna Dalmacija has been published in Split.

Another reason for this success was the editorial policy of Joško Kulušić, who used the decline of Communism to allow the paper to become a forum for new political ideas. In the early 1990s, Slobodna Dalmacija established a reputation as a newspaper with a politically diverse group of columnists, both left-leaning and those who supported the government. However, the ruling right-wing Croatian Democratic Union tried discredit it, calling the journalists too "liberal", "communist" or "Yugoslav". At that time it had a circulation of 90,000 to 100,000 copies.

In 1992, the government initiated proceedings against the paper, which eventually resulted in one of the most notorious scandals in recent Croatian history. Slobodna Dalmacija was privatised, which resulted in Miroslav Kutle, a businessman from Zagreb, becoming the new owner. After a brief attempt to prevent the handover by strike, the paper was formally taken over in March 1993.

After the war ended in 1995, Slobodna Dalmacija was faced with serious financial problems. In the late 1990s, the newspaper was again taken over by the government. However, it retained its distinctively hard-line nationalist stance, even during the first year of Prime Minister Ivica Račan's left-of-center government.

In 2005, Slobodna Dalmacija was reprivatised again. This time it was sold to Europapress Holding, making it a sister paper of Jutarnji list.

In 2014, it was bought by Marijan Hanžeković along with EPH and became more of a right-wing newspaper. There have been situations where left oriented journalist were forbidden to write what they want (such as Damir Pilić in 2015). EPH fired journalists from the liberal spectrum such as Boris Dežulović while several far-right journalists were hired.

== Editors-in-chief ==
- 1943–44: Šerif Šehović
- 1944–45: Neven Šegvić
- 1945–46: Petar Šegvić
- 1946–47: Antun Maštrović
- 1947–49: Božidar Novak
- 1949: Branko Karadžole
- 1949–51: Vladimir Pilepić
- 1951: Igor Radinović
- 1951–53: Igor Pršen
- 1955–57: Nikola Disopra
- 1957–65: Sibe Kvesić
- 1965–73: Hrvoje Baričić
- 1973–78: Marin Kuzmić
- 1982–83: Joško Franceschi
- 1983–93: Joško Kulušić
- 1993–94: Dino Mikulandra
- 1994–96: Josip Jović
- 1996–97: Krunoslav Kljaković
- 1997–98: Miroslav Ivić
- 1998–2000: Olga Ramljak
- 2000–01: Josip Jović
- 2001–05: Dražen Gudić
- 2005–08: Mladen Pleše
- 2008–10: Zoran Krželj
- 2010–14: Krunoslav Kljaković
- 2014–17: Ivo Bonković
- 2017–21: Jadran Kapor
- 2021–present: Sandra Lapenda-Lemo
