= Slobodni tjednik =

Defunct Croatian weekly magazine

Slobodni tjednik, also known as ST, is a defunct Croatian weekly magazine which was published in Zagreb in the early 1990s. Owned and edited by Marinko Božić, it was the first Croatian tabloid.

== History ==
Slobodni tjednik ("Independent Weekly" in Croatian) appeared in February 1990, on the eve of first free elections in Croatia. While being one of many media outlets started in the final stages of Communism, Slobodni tjednik was the first to use sensationalist headlines and similar content. As such it became Croatia's first tabloid newspaper. Slobodni tjednik quickly became one of the most popular, most influential but also one of the most controversial newspapers in Croatia. It regularly employed manipulations, falsehoods, photomontages and absurdities, giving way to a form of "pseudo-investigative journalism".

While its first issue was very critical of Croatian Democratic Union (HDZ) and Croatian nationalism, in a matter of few weeks, Slobodni tjednik suddenly shifted towards the right, embracing Franjo Tuđman and his policies. It published unverified and false stories, and depicted all Serbs in Croatia as treasonous. In the summer and autumn of 1991, Slobodni tjednik published inflammatory articles listing alleged collaborators of the Yugoslav Counterintelligence Service (KOS) and Serb rebels in Croatian cities. Individuals whose names appeared on the lists were consequently often the target of harassment and mistreatment by fellow citizens, as well as by the police and the military. In late June 1991, it published the names of 16 alleged collaborators of the KOS in Sisak. Two people from the list (Jovo Crnobrnja and Dragan Rajšić) were killed in late August of the same year as part of mass killings of Serbs in Sisak.

At the beginning of September 1991, Slobodni tjednik published a false news story about the assassination attempt of Branimir Glavaš, then secretary of the Secretariat for National Defense of the municipality of Osijek. In the article by the author Robert Pauletić, it was stated that the "Chetnik terrorist" Đorđe Petrović was killed during the assassination attempt, and the article itself was equipped with a photo of the corpse of the alleged assassin. Subsequent journalistic investigation established that there was no assassination attempt, and the murdered person from the article was identified as civilian Čedomir Vučković. Vučković was kidnapped and abused by men under the command of Branimir Glavaš, and before his death was forced to drink battery acid.

In 1992, with Croatia being internationally recognized and Sarajevo armistice bringing hostilities to temporary end, Croatian public gradually began to lose taste for extreme nationalism promoted by Slobodni tjednik. New media outlets, like Globus magazine, proved to be better adapted for new circumstances, while economic woes of its readership also affected circulation of Slobodni tjednik. That, financial mishandling, deteriorating health and death of its founder Marinko Božić on 16 December 1993 led to Slobodni tjednik being extinguished in 1993.
