= Žuži Jelinek =

Hungarian-born Croatian fashion designer (1920–2016)

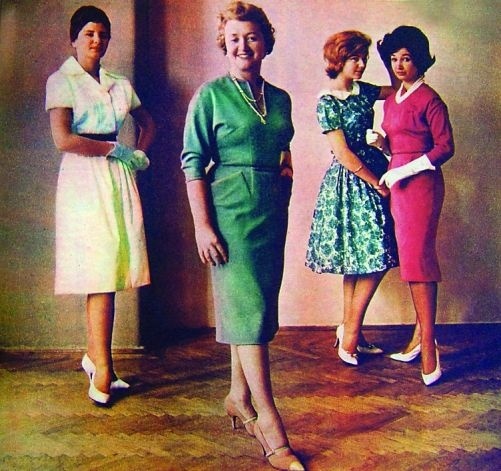
- Jelinek (centre) posing with her models in Zagreb, June 1960.
- Born: Suzana Ferber; 17 July 1920; Budapest, Kingdom of Hungary
- Died: 23 January 2016 (aged 95); Zagreb, Croatia
- Occupations: Fashion stylist, designer, writer

Žuži Jelinek (born Suzana Ferber; 17 July 1920 – 23 January 2016) was a Hungarian-born Croatian fashion stylist, designer, and writer.

== Early life ==
Jelinek was born in 1920 in Budapest to poor Jewish parents, Izidor and Ruža Ferber, as the youngest of three children. Her father changed his surname from Farber to Ferber. Jelinek's paternal grandfather was Moritz Farber, a textile merchant from Ludbreg. Her parents were both deaf, her father was from Ludbreg and her mother was from Hungary. They met in Budapest, where they were sent by their families to the only specialized school for deaf people in the area. Jelinek also had two brothers. After Jelinek's birth, her family moved to Zagreb. They lived in a poor part of town. Although Jelinek's aunt, her father's sister, was married to a wealthy Zagreb Jew, Jelinek said that her family didn't benefit from it. Jelinek's aunt was ashamed of her poor deaf brother, so when Jelinek's family visited, she would receive them in the kitchen because, according to Jelinek, they were not good enough for the salons in the house. At that time, Jelinek swore that she would have a successful life. The humiliation experienced in childhood poverty were incentives for her to attain a decent life. She graduated from the Zagreb School of Tailors.

== Career and later life ==
Jelinek was only 17 years of age when she began to work in Paris as a seamstress in a factory of Nina Ricci. While in Paris, Jelinek met Coco Chanel, for whom she briefly worked. Because of World War II, Jelinek returned to Zagreb in 1939. In Zagreb, she opened a tailor shop, where she sewed for wealthy Jewish families. Jelinek was also active in language learning. In 1941, she met and married her first husband, Zagreb dentist Dr. Erich Jelinek. From that marriage, Jelinek has two children, son Ivica and daughter Dijana.

With the establishment of the Independent State of Croatia in 1941, the infamous Ustaša policy soon led her brothers to the camps where they were both killed, one in the Kerestinec concentration camp and other one in the Jadovno concentration camp. While in Sušak, where she moved to escape the Ustaše and Nazi persecution, Jelinek learned that her parents were about to be transported to Jasenovac concentration camp. She went to an Italian officer, whom she seduced, and thus saved her parents from deportation. During the war, Jelinek joined the Partisans. After the war she began to sew again, and at 40 she moved to the United States.

In the United States, she sewed and was very successful at it. When she returned to Zagreb, Jelinek found out that her husband had left her for a servant-girl. She continued to work hard and traveled the world. That however bothered Josip Broz Tito. Tito called her and said that she could not continue to travel and promote her models as Žuži Jelinek, because he considered it not to be beneficial for the Yugoslavia workers' self-management. He offered to make her the director of the Macedonian fashion company Teteks. Jelinek refused this offer and in 1962, during a speech, Tito named her a negative element in Yugoslavia. She was told to leave. She then moved with her children and parents to Geneva. Upon her arrival, Jelinek traveled to a street and asked for the cheapest apartment for her family. At the time of her death on that very same street, she was the owner of four houses. She returned to Zagreb in 1964, when Tito invited her to come home. After her arrival, she sewed fashion creations for Tito's wife, Jovanka Broz. During her career, Jelinek sold fashion creations in the United States, Japan and all of Europe.

Jelinek authored eight books and was from 1994 as a regular columnist to the Croatian women's magazine Gloria. Croatian Radiotelevision produced a documentary which recounts Jelinek's life during her early years of poverty and then her later success. A few years before her death Jelinek received an offer from Steven Spielberg, who wanted to make a film about her life. It has been said that because he heard her story, that of a single Jewish woman during the Holocaust who risked her life to save those of her parents. Therein, Spielberg invited Jelinek to be the chief adviser for the film. In the end, although she was very flattered by the offer, Jelinek declined, concluding that due to constraints on her time, she couldn't afford to spend two years in the United States. Jelinek resided in Zagreb, Geneva and Opatija. Jelinek had three marriages after her first. Her last husband was Milorad Ronkulin.

Jelinek was a longtime council member of the Jewish community in Zagreb.

Jelinek died on 23 January 2016, at the age of 95.

== Published works ==
- Seks liječi sve, Profil, 2004
- Žene, osvajajte..., Znanje, 2010
- Mijenjaju li se muškarci, Znanje, 2011
