= Vladimir Milanković =

Vladimir Milanković is a former commander in the special police of the Croatian Ministry of the Interior (MUP), active during the Yugoslav wars. He became the operational commander of the SUP in Sisak, a military-police structure led by Đuro Brodarac and Ivan Bobetko (the son of Janko Bobetko).

Under his command, Sisak's Serbs were persecuted during the Croatian War. In 2013, he was convicted of ordering illegal arrests and not punishing crimes against Serb civilians which included illegal detentions, threats, and mental and physical abuses which resulted in the deaths of 24 people over a period of one year. In 2022, he made a plea to the European Court of Human Rights in Strasbourg arguing that he should not have been convicted of command responsibility as he was commander of a police unit and not the army; the complaint was dismissed.
