= Sportske Novosti award =

Sportske Novosti award is an annual football award established in 2001 by the Croatian daily sports newspaper Sportske novosti. It is awarded to the highest polling football player. The newspaper polls top coaches and players for the occasion.

== Winners ==
| Year | Player | Club | Coaches and players polled |
|---|---|---|---|
| 2001 | (Spain) Raúl | (Spain) Real Madrid | ? |
| 2002 | (Brazil) Roberto Carlos | (Spain) Real Madrid | ? |
| 2003 | (Czech Republic) Pavel Nedvěd | (Italy) Juventus | ? |
| 2004 | (Ukraine) Andriy Shevchenko | (Italy) Milan | ? |
| 2005 | (England) Frank Lampard | (England) Chelsea | ? |
| 2006 | (France) Thierry Henry | (England) Arsenal | Fabio Capello, Felix Magath, Carlo Ancelotti, Lothar Matthäus, Guus Hiddink; Srečko Katanec, Roberto Mancini, Marco van Basten, Didier Deschamps, Slaven Bilić |
| 2007 | (Brazil) Kaká | (Italy) Milan | Zico, Safet Sušić, Herbert Prohaska, Emilio Butragueño, Andreas Brehme; Franco Baresi, Zbigniew Boniek, Marcel Desailly, Robert Prosinečki, Kenny Dalglish |
