= Sportske novosti =

Croatian newspaper

- Type: Daily sports newspaper
- Format: Berliner
- Owner: Europapress Holding
- Publisher: Sportske novosti d.d.
- Editor: Robert Šola
- Founded: 9 August 1945
- Language: Croatian
- Headquarters: Zagreb, Croatia
- Circulation: 50,000 (2004)
- ISSN: 0350-7491
- Website: sportske.jutarnji.hr

Sportske novosti (lit. 'Sports News') is a Croatian daily sports newspaper based in Zagreb.

The newspaper was established on 9 August 1945 as Ilustrirane fiskulturne novine weekly newspaper. Several months later, on 10 December 1945, its name was changed to Narodni sport. From March 1949, its publishing frequency increased to twice a week, and from 1951 to three times per week.

== History ==
In 1999, the newspaper was acquired by Europapress Holding publishing company. Since 2001, it has regularly been published on Sunday. Later that year, the Sportske novosti Footballer of the Year award for the best footballer in the world – as voted by some of the world's top coaches and players – was established. On 30 December 2005, Zvonimir Boban was appointed CEO of Sportske novosti, who later announced that the newspaper would in the future give more attention to football-related news. He resigned from his position in December 2008 due to his long-standing dissatisfaction with the editorial board.

Radomir Ivanović wins the Golden Glove in 1962, published in Sportske novosti

In 2013, the Croatian football syndicate established Football Oscar awards chosen by Croatian footballers and coaches. The chosen categories are Croatian Footballer of the Year, HNL Footballer of the Year, HNL Young Footballer of the Year, HNL Goalkeeper of the Year, HNL Referee of the Year, HNL Coach of the Year, HNL Team of the Year, and Fairplay Team of the Year.

== See also ==
- Sportske novosti awards (For highest achievements in Croatian men's, women's and team sports)
- Sportske novosti Yellow Shirt award (For the Prva HNL footballer of the year)
- Sportske Novosti World Footballer of the Year award (For the best world footballer of the year)
