= 2001 Ballon d'Or =

Annual association football award event in France

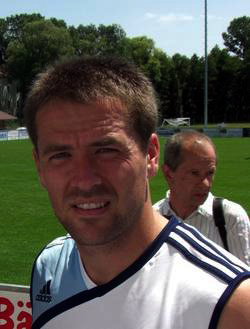
- 2001 Ballon d'Or winner, Michael Owen in 2007
- Date: 18 December 2001
- Presented by: France Football

Highlights
- Won by: (England) Michael Owen (1st award)
- Website: ballondor.com

The 2001 Ballon d'Or (lit. '2001 Golden Ball'), given to the best football player in Europe as judged by a panel of sports journalists from UEFA member countries, was awarded to Michael Owen on 18 December 2001.

Owen was the fourth English national to win the award after Stanley Matthews (1956), Bobby Charlton (1966) and Kevin Keegan (1978, 1979).

== Rankings ==
On 12 November 2001, the shortlist of 50 male players compiled by a group of experts from France Football was announced.

Rank	Player	Club(s)	Nationality	Points
1	Michael Owen	(England) Liverpool	England	176
2	Raúl	(Spain) Real Madrid	Spain	140
3	Oliver Kahn	(Germany) Bayern Munich	Germany	114
4	David Beckham	(England) Manchester United	England	102
5	Francesco Totti	(Italy) Roma	Italy	57
6	Luís Figo	(Spain) Real Madrid	Portugal	56
7	Rivaldo	(Spain) Barcelona	Brazil	20
8	Andriy Shevchenko	(Italy) Milan	Ukraine	18
9	Thierry Henry	(England) Arsenal	France	14
9	Zinedine Zidane	(Spain) Real Madrid	France	14
11	Bixente Lizarazu	(Germany) Bayern Munich	France	10
12	David Trezeguet	(Italy) Juventus	France	7
13	Stefan Effenberg	(Germany) Bayern Munich	Germany	6
14	Henrik Larsson	(Scotland) Celtic	Sweden	4
14	Alessandro Nesta	(Italy) Lazio	Italy	4
16	Juan Sebastián Verón	(Italy) Lazio (England) Manchester United	Argentina	3
16	Hernán Crespo	(Italy) Lazio	Argentina	3
18	Giovane Élber	(Germany) Bayern Munich	Brazil	2
18	Gaizka Mendieta	(Spain) Valencia (Italy) Lazio	Spain	2
18	Roberto Carlos	(Spain) Real Madrid	Brazil	2
18	Damiano Tommasi	(Italy) Roma	Italy	2
18	Sami Hyypiä	(England) Liverpool	Finland	2
18	Emmanuel Olisadebe	(Greece) Panathinaikos	Poland	2
18	Ebbe Sand	(Germany) Schalke 04	Denmark	2
25	Roberto Baggio	(Italy) Brescia	Italy	1
25	Steven Gerrard	(England) Liverpool	England	1
25	Rui Costa	(Italy) Milan	Portugal	1
28	Sonny Anderson	(France) Lyon	Brazil	0
28	Fabien Barthez	(England) Manchester United	France	0
28	Gabriel Batistuta	(Italy) Roma	Argentina	0
28	Gianluigi Buffon	(Italy) Parma (Italy) Juventus	Italy	0
28	Cafu	(Italy) Roma	Brazil	0
28	Vincent Candela	(Italy) Roma	France	0
28	Alessandro Del Piero	(Italy) Juventus	Italy	0
28	Marcel Desailly	(England) Chelsea	France	0
28	Rio Ferdinand	(England) Leeds United	England	0
28	Ryan Giggs	(England) Manchester United	Wales	0
28	Jimmy Floyd Hasselbaink	(England) Chelsea	Netherlands	0
28	Iván Helguera	(Spain) Real Madrid	Spain	0
28	Harry Kewell	(England) Leeds United	Australia	0
28	Patrick Kluivert	(Spain) Barcelona	Netherlands	0
28	Samuel Kuffour	(Germany) Bayern Munich	Ghana	0
28	Hidetoshi Nakata	(Italy) Roma (Italy) Parma	Japan	0
28	Pavel Nedvěd	(Italy) Lazio (Italy) Juventus	Czech Republic	0
28	Pauleta	(France) Bordeaux	Portugal	0
28	Robert Pires	(England) Arsenal	France	0
28	Paul Scholes	(England) Manchester United	England	0
28	Lilian Thuram	(Italy) Parma (Italy) Juventus	France	0
28	Patrick Vieira	(England) Arsenal	France	0
28	Eric Carrière	(France) Nantes	France	0
