= Gloria (magazine) =

Croatian women's magazine

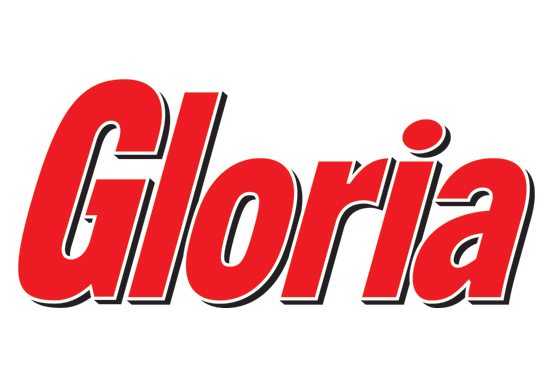

- July 2012 issue of Gloria
- Categories: Women's magazine
- Frequency: Weekly
- Circulation: 130,000 (2007)
- Publisher: Hanza Media
- First issue: 8 February 1994
- Country: Croatia
- Based in: Zagreb
- Language: Croatian
- Website: www.gloria.hr

Gloria is a Croatian language weekly women's magazine published in Zagreb, Croatia. As of 2007, it was the best-selling weekly magazine in Croatia.

== History and profile ==
Gloria was first published on 8 February 1994. The magazine is published on a weekly basis.

With a circulation of 130,000 copies in 2007, Gloria was the best-selling weekly magazine in Croatia. A significant part of the magazine's circulation is sold in Bosnia and Herzegovina. A licensed edition of the magazine is published by Europapress Beograd, a subsidiary of Europapress Holding, and the magazine is sold in Serbia, Montenegro, North Macedonia and Republika Srpska.

Gloria's focus is coverage of the international jet set, as well as Croatian high society events. Like many other women's magazines, Gloria has columns on beauty, fashion trends, and sex and romance. One of the magazine's regular columnists was Žuži Jelinek.
