= Hanza Media =

Media company in Croatia and Southeast Europe

- Type: Private
- Founded: 1990
- Founder: Ninoslav Pavić
- Headquarters: Zagreb, Croatia
- Key people: Ana Hanžeković (Member of the Board)
- Owner: Hanza Press (Ana Hanžeković and Dora Hanžeković Žuža)
- Number of employees: 630 FTE (2024)
- Website: HanzaMedia.hr

Hanza Media (until July 1, 2016: Europapress Holding, or EPH) is a Croatian print media publishing company.

Hanza Media's consumer magazines are aimed at the public and range from general-interest titles, which appeal to a broad spectrum of readers, to highly specialist titles covering particular hobbies, leisure pursuits or other interest. Hanza Media also has strong national and international operations and is involved in printed media distribution, media production and tourism.

At the end of the first decade of the century the EPH did not timely nor successfully adapt to market and financial crisis that hit the newspaper industry after 2008, primarily dramatically reducing resources from advertising and marketing. The decline of newspapers has been debated, as the industry has faced slumping ad sales, the loss of much classified advertising and precipitous drops in circulation.

Faced with the impossibility of regular loan repayment, the ownership (Ninoslav Pavić and WAZ-Mediengruppe with 50 percent each) reached in February 2014 a pre-failure settlement with creditors. So 90 percent of the share passed into the hands of the Hypo Group, which soon sold its share to the local attorney and prominent distraint enforcer for state-owned national broadcaster HTV, Marijan Hanžeković.

== History ==
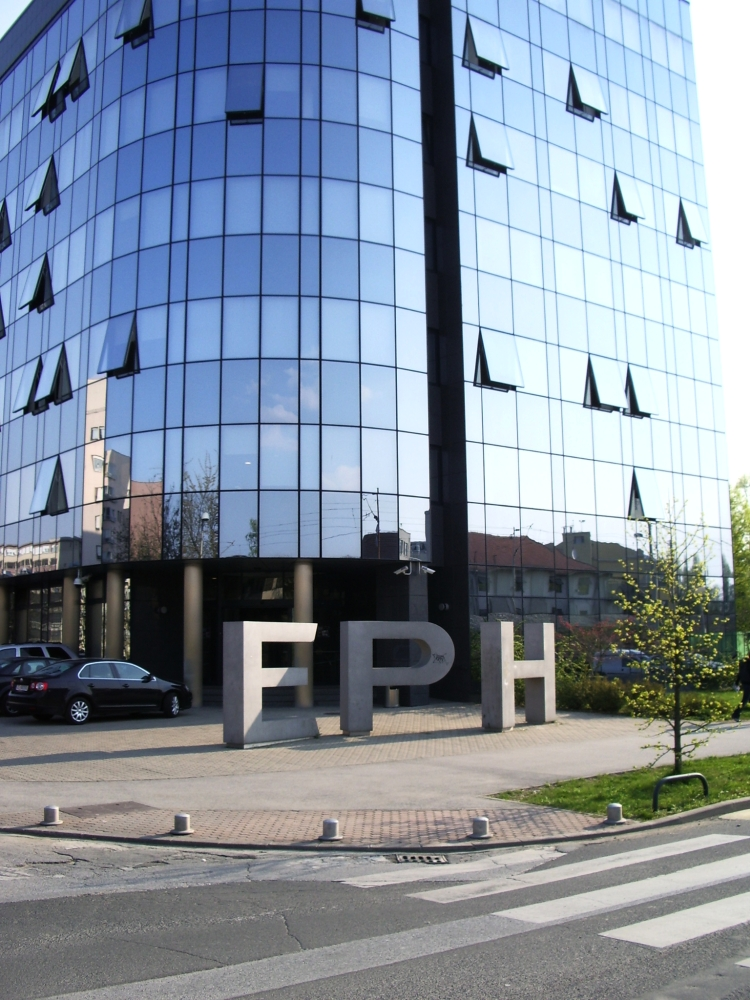
Hanza Media building in Zagreb

=== Founding ===
Founded in 1990 by Ninoslav Pavić and his partners, Europapress Holding's first publication was the weekly news magazine Globus.

First published in December 1990, Globus was originally devised as a tabloid. Low circulation and financial losses marked its first year in print. However, with the start of the Croatian War of Independence, Globus instantly shifted its focus and started publishing revealing stories from the front lines. It was the first publication to report war crimes committed by Serbian forces against Croats in Croatia.

Later on, in mid and late 1990s, Globus started writing about the shady aspects of privatization in Croatia, organized crime and all other topics avoided by the government-controlled media. As such, Globus is credited for introducing investigative and independent journalism in Croatia.

=== EPH launches Playboy ===
In 1996, Playboy Enterprises and Europapress Holding announced a partnership to launch a new edition of Playboy magazine in Croatia. Playboy Croatia officially launched with its February/March 1997 issue. EPH sold its rights on Playboy, Cosmopolitan and Grazia in 2010.

=== Starting a new daily newspaper ===
In 1998, Europapress Holding decided to start Jutarnji list (trans. "morning paper"), a modern daily newspaper with progressive social views. It was launched in April 1998, being the first successful daily newspaper to appear after Croatian independence. It was named after a Zagreb daily that used to circulate before WW2. It quickly took the lion's share of Croatian media market and became one of the most read newspapers in country. Today, its circulation is about 115,000.

=== Acquisition of Sportske Novosti ===
In 1999, Europapress holding bought Sportske novosti, the only sports daily in Croatia and one of the leading sports newspapers in Europe. On 30 December 2005 Zvonimir Boban was appointed CEO of Sportske novosti. Boban resigned from his position in December 2008 due to his long-standing dissatisfaction with the editorial board.

=== Bomb attack on Pavić ===
On 1 March 2003, a bomb exploded under the car of Nino Pavić, the owner of Croatia's biggest private publishing company Europapress Holding. Pavić was not in the car when the bomb exploded. No one was hurt, but the police investigation failed to trace the attacker or attackers. The attack received worldwide condemnation from other publishers and human rights organizations. The President of World Association of Newspapers and the World Editors Forum, which represents 18,000 publications in 100 countries, wrote a letter to the Croatian government to express serious concern at the attempted murder of press magnate Pavic. The leading human rights and democracy monitoring organization OSCE claimed that the "car bombing targeting Croatian media mogul Pavic was an 'act of terror'".

=== Acquisition of Slobodna Dalmacija ===
In 2005, EPH launched a buyout bid of more than 540 million kunas (80 million euros) for the popular local daily, Slobodna Dalmacija. The offer was accepted, and in late 2005 the deal was settled. There were a number of negative reactions and accusations of a potentially monopolistic position the purchase would mean for EPH. Slobodna Dalmacija has since seen an increase in circulation, now at around 60,000 copies, as well as an updated layout and format.

=== University North ===
In 2005, EPH was given a permission to start a private Media university in Split by the minister Dragan Primorac. It was later decided that the Media university relocates to the inland city of Koprivnica where it started conducting education in the field of media. In 2014 Media university merged with the university of applied sciences in Varaždin and started operating as the University North. Former prime minister and current president of Croatia Zoran Milanović announced that the University North would become a public national university, which finally occurred in 2015 as the Ministry of science and education passed a law named 'Zakon o prijenosu osnivačkih prava s gradova Koprivnice i Varaždina na Republiku Hrvatsku' and transferred the ownership from cities of Koprivnica and Varaždin on to Croatia. It is the only public university currently operating in the areas of Central and Northern Croatia Croatia alongside the University of Zagreb, having around 5500 students. The university continues to provide and develop bachelor, master and doctoral studies in the field of media, however, it provides education in other fields such as traffic and logistics, economics, nutrition, geodesy, construction, electrical and mechanical engineering, recycling, medicine, informatics and more.

In the pre-bankruptcy settlement, Hypo Group acquired 90 percent ownership, and 5 percent each was retained by Ninoslav Pavić (until February 26, 2014, 50%) and WAZ Medien (until February 26, 2014, 50%), and Hypo Group sold its share to the company Hanza Press Marijan Hanžeković. Therefore, on 22 December and 30 December 2014, the EPH Assembly appointed a new management board in which President Zrinka Vuković Berić, former Director of Finance and Procurator of the Law Firm Hanžeković and Partners, and members journalist Tomislav Wruss, the initiator of the first ten years of publishing the editor-in-chief of Jutarnji list and a few days later Ante Samodol (formerly the President of the management board of the Croatian Financial Services Supervisory Agency).

Hanza Media withdrew from the pre-bankruptcy settlement in 2019, as it had complied with all obligations under the settlement, ahead of schedule. This was formally confirmed on February 20, 2020, when the Commercial Court in Karlovac issued a decision on "deleting the record of approval of the pre-bankruptcy settlement of the subject of registration Hanza Media d.o.o. for publishing ". As part of the settlement, total liabilities in the amount of HRK 497,815,475.98 were settled.

== Main editions ==
=== Newspapers ===
- Jutarnji list (national daily newspaper)
  - Studio (weekly supplement on television, music, theatre)
- Slobodna Dalmacija (national daily newspaper)
- Sportske novosti (national daily sports newspaper)
- Šibenski list (regional weekly newspaper)
- Dubrovački vjesnik (regional weekly newspaper)
- Dubrovnik Times (regional seasonal weekly newspaper in English)

=== Specialized Newsrooms ===
- Gospodarstvo (Economy)
  - Novac.hr (Money)
- Euractiv.hr

=== Magazines ===
- Globus (biweekly newsmagazine)
- Gloria (magazine on entertainment and celebrities)
  - Gloria In
  - Gloria In Special
- Gloria Glam
- Gloria Dom
- Vita (wellness & health advice)
- Doktor u kući (health)
- Doktor Special
- Auto klub
- Otvoreno more
- Dobra kob
- Maslina

=== Websites ===
- Jutarnji.hr (news portal)
  - Novac.Jutarnji.hr
  - Euractiv.Jutarnji.hr
- SlobodnaDalmacija.hr (news portal)
- Dubrovacki.hr
- SportskeNovosti.hr
- Gloria.hr
- Autoklub.hr (automobiles & motor sports)
- OKjeOK.hr
- Domidizajn.hr
- Dobra-hrana.hr
- dosi.hr (osiguranja)
- Bestseller.hr
- Gorila.Jutarnji.hr
- LikeCroatia.com
- 100posto.hr
- zivim.hr
