= Ninoslav Pavić =

Ninoslav Pavić, a.k.a. Nino Pavić, is the founder and previous owner of Europapress Holding, with his brother Nenad Pavić who was director of now Hanza Media, the largest media company in Southeast Europe. He was the first media mogul of Croatia.

== Car bombed ==
On 1 March 2003, a bomb exploded under Pavić's car. Pavić was not in the car when the bomb exploded. No one was hurt, but the police investigation failed to trace the attacker or attackers. According to South East Europe Media Organisation Secretary General Oliver Vujovic the "attack on Pavic and threats against Pukanic in 2002, as also threats against Drago Hedl, are cases that SEEMO takes as clear violation of freedom of work of persons connected to media in Croatia" The attack received worldwide condemnation from other publishers and human rights organizations. The President of the World Association of Newspapers and the World Editors Forum, which represents 18,000 publications in 100 countries, wrote a letter to the Croatian government to express serious concern at the attempted murder of press magnate Pavic. The leading human rights and democracy monitoring organization, the Organization for Security and Co-operation in Europe, claimed that the "car bombing targeting Croatian media mogul Pavic was an 'act of terror'".
