= Jutarnji list =

Croatian daily newspaper

- Front page of the 17 October 2009 issue
- Type: Daily newspaper
- Format: Berliner
- Owners: Ana Hanžeković Krznarić (CEO); Dora Hanžeković Žuža
- Publisher: Hanza Media d.o.o.
- Editor-in-chief: Goran Ogurlić
- Founded: 6 April 1998
- Political alignment: Liberalism; Social democracy
- Language: Croatian
- City: Zagreb
- Country: Croatia
- Circulation: 66,000 (October 2014)
- ISSN: 1331-5692
- Website: www.jutarnji.hr

Jutarnji list (lit. 'The Morning Paper') is a Croatian daily newspaper based in Zagreb. It was published on 6 April 1998 by EPH (Europapress holding, owned by Ninoslav Pavić), which eventually changed its name in Hanza Media after being bought by Marijan Hanžeković. The newspaper is published in the Berliner format and online. Its online edition, Jutarnji.hr, is the second most-visited news website in Croatia after Index.hr.

According to Hanžeković, "Jutarnji list should be conceptually a newspaper of liberal and social-democratic orientation, with emphasis on accuracy and relevance."

== History and profile ==
Jutarnji list was launched in April 1998, becoming the first successful Croatian daily newspaper to appear since the 1950s. It was named after the Jutarnji list Zagreb daily that used to circulate from 1912 until 1941. The newspaper is part of Hanza Media media group.

In 2003, Jutarnji list launched a comprehensive Sunday edition, Nedjeljni Jutarnji. On 19 February 2005, Jutarnji list published an exhaustive biography of Ante Gotovina. (Note: A French translation of this investigation can be found in and titled "Courrier des Balkans".)

The paper quickly took the majority of the Croatian media market and became one of the most-read newspapers in that country. In the first five years, it sold more than 214 million copies. During the actual economic crisis, the number of sold copies diminished from about 80,000 in 2007 to 52,763 in 2013. The crisis hit in the same manner as other daily newspapers in Croatia. The circulation of Jutarnji list was 66,000 copies in October 2014.

== Controversies ==
In February 2008, Jutarnji list was involved in a scandal when it published an interview with what was thought to be Prime Minister of Croatia Ivo Sanader. The reporter contacted then-23-year-old Viktor Zahtila by e-mail and SMS, whom he assumed to be the prime minister. Zahtila replied via e-mail and did not state that he was Ivo Sanader.
